= Judicial districts of Quebec =

The province of Quebec is divided into 36 judicial districts by the Territorial Division Act, R.S.Q., chapter D-11. Each district has a seat where the courthouse is located, although some have more than one courthouse, service point, or itinerant court location.

Judicial district	Seat and other courthouses	Municipalities served
Abitibi	Amos; Other courthouses: Chibougamau, Kuujjuaq, Val-d'Or; Judicial service centre: La Sarre; Itinerant services: Senneterre, Akulivik, Ivujivik, Kuujjuarapik, Puvirnituq, Salluit, Umiujaq, Kangiqsualujjuaq, Kangiqsujuaq, Kangirsuk, Quaqtaq, Chisasibi, Eastmain, Waskaganish, Wemindji, Mistissini, Nemiscau, Oujé-Bougoumou, Waswanipi	Akulivik, Amos, Aupaluk, Authier, Authier-Nord, Baie-James, Barraute, Belcourt, Berry, Champneuf, Chapais, Chazel, Chibougamau, Chisasibi, Clermont, Clerval, Duparquet, Dupuy, Eastmain, Gallichan, Ivujivik, Kangiqsualujjuaq, Kangiqsujuaq, Kangirsuk, Kiggaluk, Killiniq, Kitcisakik, Kuujjuaq, Kuujjuarapik, La Corne, La Morandière-Rochebaucourt, La Motte, La Reine, La Sarre, Landrienne, Launay, Lebel-sur-Quévillon, Macamic, Malartic, Matagami, Mistissini, Nemiscau, Normétal, Obedjiwan, Oujé-Bougoumou, Palmarolle, Pikogan, Poularies, Preissac, Puvirnituq, Quaqtaq, Rapide-Danseur, Rivière-Héva, Roquemaure, Saint-Dominique-du-Rosaire, Saint-Lambert, Saint-Marc-de-Figuery, Saint-Mathieu-d'Harricana, Sainte-Germaine-Boulé, Sainte-Gertrude-Manneville, Sainte-Hélène-de-Mancebourg, Salluit, Senneterre, Taschereau, Tasiujaq, Trécesson, Umiujaq, Val-d'Or, Val-Saint-Gilles, Waskaganish, Waswanipi, Wemindji, Whapmagoostui
Alma	Alma	Alma, Desbiens, Hébertville, L'Ascension-de-Notre-Seigneur, Métabetchouan–Lac-à-la-Croix, Saint-Gédéon, Saint-Henri-de-Taillon, Sainte-Monique
Arthabaska	Victoriaville	Chesterville, Daveluyville, Maddington, Norbertville, Princeville, Saint-Albert, Saint-Christophe-d'Arthabaska, Saint-Louis-de-Blandford, Saint-Norbert-d'Arthabaska, Saint-Rémi-de-Tingwick, Saint-Rosaire, Saint-Valère, Sainte-Clotilde-de-Horton, Sainte-Élisabeth-de-Warwick, Sainte-Hélène-de-Chester, Sainte-Séraphine, Sainte-Sophie-d'Halifax, Tingwick, Victoriaville, Warwick
Baie-Comeau	Baie-Comeau; Judicial service centre: Forestville	Baie-Comeau, Baie-Trinité, Betsiamites, Chute-aux-Outardes, Colombier, Essipit, Forestville, Franquelin, Godbout, Les Bergeronnes, Les Escoumins, Longue-Rive, Pointe-aux-Outardes, Pointe-Lebel, Portneuf-sur-Mer, Ragueneau, Sacré-Coeur, Tadoussac
Beauce	Saint-Joseph-de-Beauce; Itinerant services: Saint-Georges	Beauceville, Frampton, Lac-Etchemin, Lac-Poulin, Notre-Dame-des-Pins, Saint-Alfred, Saint-Anselme, Saint-Benjamin, Saint-Benoît-Labre, Saint-Bernard, Saint-Côme–Linière, Saint-Cyprien, Saint-Elzéar, Saint-Éphrem-de-Beauce, Saint-Frédéric, Saint-Gédéon-de-Beauce, Saint-Georges, Saint-Hilaire-de-Dorset, Saint-Honoré-de-Shenley, Saint-Isidore, Saint-Joseph-de-Beauce, Saint-Joseph-des-Érables, Saint-Jules, Saint-Léon-de-Standon, Saint-Louis-de-Gonzague, Saint-Luc-de-Bellechasse, Saint-Malachie, Saint-Martin, Saint-Nazaire-de-Dorchester, Saint-Odilon-de-Cranbourne, Saint-Philibert, Saint-Prosper, Saint-René, Saint-Séverin, Saint-Simon-les-Mines, Saint-Théophile, Saint-Victor, Saint-Zacharie, Sainte-Aurélie, Sainte-Claire, Sainte-Clotilde-de-Beauce, Sainte-Hénédine, Sainte-Justine, Sainte-Marguerite, Sainte-Marie, Sainte-Rose-de-Watford, Saints-Anges, Scott, Tring-Jonction, Vallée-Jonction
Beauharnois	Salaberry-de-Valleyfield; Itinerant services: Châteauguay, Vaudreuil-Dorion	Akwesasne, Beauharnois, Châteauguay, Coteau-du-Lac, Dundee, Elgin, Franklin, Godmanchester, Havelock, Hemmingford, Hinchinbrooke, Howick, Hudson, Huntingdon, L'Île-Cadieux, L'Île-Perrot, Léry, Les Cèdres, Les Coteaux, Mercier, Notre-Dame-de-l'Île-Perrot, Ormstown, Pincourt, Pointe-des-Cascades, Pointe-Fortune, Rigaud, Rivière-Beaudette, Saint-Anicet, Saint-Chrysostome, Saint-Clet, Saint-Étienne-de-Beauharnois, Saint-Isidore, Saint-Lazare, Saint-Louis-de-Gonzague, Saint-Polycarpe, Saint-Stanislas-de-Kostka, Saint-Télesphore, Saint-Urbain-Premier, Saint-Zotique, Sainte-Barbe, Sainte-Clotilde-de-Châteauguay, Sainte-Justine-de-Newton, Sainte-Marthe, Sainte-Martine, Salaberry-de-Valleyfield, Terrasse-Vaudreuil, Très-Saint-Rédempteur, Très-Saint-Sacrement, Vaudreuil-Dorion, Vaudreuil-sur-le-Lac
Bedford	Cowansville; Other courthouses: Granby	Austin, Bedford, Béthanie, Bolton-Est, Bolton-Ouest, Bonsecours, Brigham, Brome, Bromont, Clarenceville, Cowansville, Dunham, East Farnham, Eastman, Farnham, Frelighsburg, Granby, Lac-Brome, Lawrenceville, Maricourt, Notre-Dame-de-Stanbridge, Noyan, Potton, Racine, Roxton, Roxton Falls, Roxton Pond, Saint-Alphonse-de-Granby, Saint-Armand, Saint-Benoît-du-Lac, Saint-Étienne-de-Bolton, Saint-Ignace-de-Stanbridge, Saint-Joachim-de-Shefford, Saint-Pierre-de-Véronne-à-Pike-River, Saint-Valérien-de-Milton, Sainte-Anne-de-la-Rochelle, Sainte-Cécile-de-Milton, Sainte-Sabine, Shefford, Stanbridge East, Stanbridge Station, Stukely-Sud, Sutton, Valcourt, Venise-en-Québec, Warden, Waterloo
Bonaventure	New Carlisle; Judicial service centre: Carleton-sur-Mer	Bonaventure, Caplan, Carleton-sur-Mer, Cascapédia–Saint-Jules, Escuminac, Gesgapegiag, Hope, Hope Town, L'Ascension-de-Patapédia, Listuguj, Maria, Matapédia, New Carlisle, New Richmond, Nouvelle, Paspébiac, Pointe-à-la-Croix, Port-Daniel–Gascons, Ristigouche-Sud-Est, Saint-Alexis-de-Matapédia, Saint-Alphonse, Saint-André-de-Restigouche, Saint-Elzéar, Saint-François-d'Assise, Saint-Godefroi, Saint-Siméon, Shigawake,
Charlevoix	La Malbaie	Baie-Saint-Paul, Baie-Sainte-Catherine, Clermont, L'Isle-aux-Coudres, La Malbaie, Les Éboulements, Notre-Dame-des-Monts, Petite-Rivière-Saint-François, Saint-Aimé-des-Lacs, Saint-Hilarion, Saint-Irénée, Saint-Siméon, Saint-Urbain
Chicoutimi	Saguenay (Chicoutimi); Itinerant services: Saguenay (Jonquière)	Bégin, Ferland-et-Boilleau, L'Anse-Saint-Jean, Labrecque, Lamarche, Larouche, Petit-Saguenay, Rivière-Éternité, Saguenay, Saint-Ambroise, Saint-Charles-de-Bourget, Saint-David-de-Falardeau, Saint-Félix-d'Otis, Saint-Fulgence, Saint-Honoré, Saint-Nazaire, Sainte-Rose-du-Nord
Drummond	Drummondville	Drummondville, Durham-Sud, Kingsey Falls, L'Avenir, Lefebvre, Notre-Dame-du-Bon-Conseil, Saint-Bonaventure, Saint-Cyrille-de-Wendover, Saint-Edmond-de-Grantham, Saint-Eugène, Saint-Félix-de-Kingsey, Saint-Germain-de-Grantham, Saint-Guillaume, Saint-Léonard-d'Aston, Saint-Lucien, Saint-Majorique-de-Grantham, Saint-Nazaire-d'Acton, Saint-Zéphirin-de-Courval, Sainte-Brigitte-des-Saults, Sainte-Perpétue, Ulverton, Wickham
Frontenac	Thetford Mines	Adstock, Beaulac-Garthby, Courcelles-Saint-Évariste, Disraeli, East Broughton, Inverness, Irlande, Kinnear's Mills, La Guadeloupe, Laurierville, Lyster, Notre-Dame-de-Lourdes, Plessisville, Sacré-Coeur-de-Jésus, Saint-Adrien-d'Irlande, Saint-Ferdinand, Saint-Jacques-de-Leeds, Saint-Jacques-le-Majeur-de-Wolfestown, Saint-Jean-de-Brébeuf, Saint-Joseph-de-Coleraine, Saint-Julien, Saint-Pierre-Baptiste, Saint-Pierre-de-Broughton, Saint-Sylvestre, Sainte-Agathe-de-Lotbinière, Sainte-Praxède, Thetford Mines
Gaspé	Percé; Other courthouses: Les Îles-de-la-Madeleine; Judicial service centre: Gaspé, Sainte-Anne-des-Monts	Cap-Chat, Chandler, Cloridorme, Gaspé, Grande-Rivière, Grande-Vallée, Grosse-Île, La Martre, Les Îles-de-la-Madeleine, Marsoui, Mont-Saint-Pierre, Murdochville, Percé, Petite-Vallée, Rivière-à-Claude, Saint-Maxime-du-Mont-Louis, Sainte-Anne-des-Monts, Sainte-Madeleine-de-la-Rivière-Madeleine, Sainte-Thérèse-de-Gaspé
Hull	Gatineau	Boileau, Bowman, Cantley, Chelsea, Chénéville, Denholm, Duhamel, Fassett, Gatineau, Gracefield, Kazabazua, L'Ange-Gardien, La Pêche, Lac-des-Plages, Lac-Sainte-Marie, Lac-Simon, Lochaber, Lochaber-Partie-Ouest, Low, Mayo, Montebello, Montpellier, Mulgrave-et-Derry, Namur, Notre-Dame-de-Bonsecours, Notre-Dame-de-la-Paix, Notre-Dame-de-la-Salette, Papineauville, Plaisance, Ripon, Saint-André-Avellin, Saint-Émile-de-Suffolk, Saint-Sixte, Thurso, Val-des-Bois, Val-des-Monts
Iberville	Saint-Jean-sur-Richelieu	Henryville, Lacolle, Mont-Saint-Grégoire, Napierville, Saint-Alexandre, Saint-Bernard-de-Lacolle, Saint-Blaise-sur-Richelieu, Saint-Cyprien-de-Napierville, Saint-Édouard, Saint-Jacques-le-Mineur, Saint-Jean-sur-Richelieu, Saint-Michel, Saint-Patrice-de-Sherrington, Saint-Paul-de-l'Île-aux-Noix, Saint-Sébastien, Saint-Valentin, Sainte-Anne-de-Sabrevois, Sainte-Brigide-d'Iberville
Joliette	Joliette; Itinerant services: Repentigny	Berthierville, Charlemagne, Chertsey, Crabtree, Entrelacs, Joliette, L'Assomption, L'Épiphanie, La Visitation-de-l'Île-Dupas, Lanoraie, Lavaltrie, Mandeville, Mascouche, Notre-Dame-de-la-Merci, Notre-Dame-de-Lourdes, Notre-Dame-des-Prairies, Rawdon, Repentigny, Saint-Alexis, Saint-Alphonse-Rodriguez, Saint-Ambroise-de-Kildare, Saint-Barthélemy, Saint-Calixte, Saint-Charles-Borromée, Saint-Cléophas-de-Brandon, Saint-Côme, Saint-Cuthbert, Saint-Damien, Saint-Didace, Saint-Donat-de-Montcalm, Saint-Esprit, Saint-Félix-de-Valois, Saint-Gabriel, Saint-Gabriel-de-Brandon, Saint-Ignace-de-Loyola, Saint-Jacques, Saint-Jean-de-Matha, Saint-Liguori, Saint-Lin–Laurentides, Saint-Michel-des-Saints, Saint-Norbert, Saint-Paul, Saint-Pierre, Saint-Roch-de-l'Achigan, Saint-Roch-Ouest, Saint-Sulpice, Saint-Thomas, Saint-Zénon, Sainte-Béatrix, Sainte-Élisabeth, Sainte-Émélie-de-l'Énergie, Sainte-Geneviève-de-Berthier, Sainte-Julienne, Sainte-Marcelline-de-Kildare, Sainte-Marie-Salomé, Sainte-Mélanie
Kamouraska	Rivière-du-Loup; Itinerant services: Cabano, La Pocatière	Auclair, Cabano, Cacouna, Dégelis, Kamouraska, L'Isle-Verte, La Pocatière, Lejeune, Mont-Carmel, Notre-Dame-des-Neiges, Notre-Dame-des-Sept-Douleurs, Notre-Dame-du-Lac, Notre-Dame-du-Portage, Packington, Pohénégamook, Rivière-Bleue, Rivière-du-Loup, Rivière-Ouelle, Saint-Alexandre-de-Kamouraska, Saint-André-de-Kamouraska, Saint-Antonin, Saint-Arsène, Saint-Athanase, Saint-Bruno-de-Kamouraska, Saint-Clément, Saint-Cyprien, Saint-Denis, Saint-Éloi, Saint-Elzéar-de-Témiscouata, Saint-Épiphane, Saint-Eusèbe, Saint-François-Xavier-de-Viger, Saint-Gabriel-Lalemant, Saint-Germain-de-Kamouraska, Saint-Honoré-de-Témiscouata, Saint-Hubert-de-Rivière-du-Loup, Saint-Jean-de-Dieu, Saint-Jean-de-la-Lande, Saint-Joseph-de-Kamouraska, Saint-Juste-du-Lac, Saint-Louis-du-Ha! Ha!, Saint-Marc-du-Lac-Long, Saint-Michel-du-Squatec, Saint-Modeste, Saint-Pacôme, Saint-Pascal, Saint-Paul-de-la-Croix, Saint-Philippe-de-Néri, Saint-Pierre-de-Lamy, Sainte-Françoise, Sainte-Hélène, Sainte-Rita, Trois-Pistoles, Whitworth
Labelle	Mont-Laurier; Other courthouses: Maniwaki	Aumond, Blue Sea, Bois-Franc, Bouchette, Chute-Saint-Philippe, Déléage, Egan-Sud, Ferme-Neuve, Grand-Remous, Kiamika, Kitigan Zibi, L'Ascension, La Conception, La Macaza, La Minerve, Labelle, Lac-des-Écorces, Lac-du-Cerf, Lac-Saguay, Lac-Saint-Paul, Lac-Tremblant-Nord, Maniwaki, Messines, Mont-Laurier, Mont-Saint-Michel, Montcerf-Lytton, Nominingue, Notre-Dame-de-Pontmain, Notre-Dame-du-Laus, Rivière-Rouge, Saint-Aimé-du-Lac-des-Îles, Sainte-Anne-du-Lac, Sainte-Thérèse-de-la-Gatineau
Laval	Laval	Laval
Longueuil	Longueuil	Boucherville, Brossard, Candiac, Carignan, Chambly, Delson, Kahnawake, La Prairie, Longueuil, Saint-Basile-le-Grand, Saint-Bruno-de-Montarville, Saint-Constant, Saint-Lambert, Saint-Mathieu, Saint-Philippe, Saint-Rémi, Sainte-Catherine, Sainte-Julie
Mégantic	Lac-Mégantic	Audet, Frontenac, Lac-Drolet, Lac-Mégantic, Lambton, Marston, Milan, Nantes, Notre-Dame-des-Bois, Piopolis, Saint-Augustin-de-Woburn, Saint-Ludger, Saint-Robert-Bellarmin, Saint-Romain, Saint-Sébastien, Sainte-Cécile-de-Whitton, Stornoway, Stratford, Val-Racine
Mingan	Sept-Îles; Itinerant services: Blanc-Sablon, Fermont, Havre-Saint-Pierre, Kawawachikamach, La Romaine, Natashquan, Port-Cartier, Saint-Augustin, Schefferville	Aguanish, Baie-Johan-Beetz, Blanc-Sablon, Bonne-Espérance, Côte-Nord-du-Golfe-du-Saint-Laurent, Fermont, Gros-Mécatina, Havre-Saint-Pierre, Kawawachikamach, L'Île-d'Anticosti, La Romaine, Lac-John, Longue-Pointe-de-Mingan, Maliotenam, Matimekosh, Mingan, Natashquan, Pakuashipi, Port-Cartier, Rivière-au-Tonnerre, Rivière-Saint-Jean, Saint-Augustin, Schefferville, Sept-Îles, Uashat
Montmagny	Montmagny	Armagh, Berthier-sur-Mer, Cap-Saint-Ignace, Honfleur, L'Islet, La Durantaye, Lac-Frontière, Montmagny, Notre-Dame-Auxiliatrice-de-Buckland, Notre-Dame-du-Rosaire, Saint-Adalbert, Saint-Antoine-de-l'Isle-aux-Grues, Saint-Aubert, Saint-Camille-de-Lellis, Saint-Charles-de-Bellechasse, Saint-Cyrille-de-Lessard, Saint-Damase-de-L'Islet, Saint-Damien-de-Buckland, Saint-Fabien-de-Panet, Saint-François-de-la-Rivière-du-Sud, Saint-Gervais, Saint-Jean-Port-Joli, Saint-Just-de-Bretenières, Saint-Lazare-de-Bellechasse, Saint-Magloire, Saint-Marcel, Saint-Michel-de-Bellechasse, Saint-Nérée, Saint-Omer, Saint-Pamphile, Saint-Paul-de-Montminy, Saint-Philémon, Saint-Pierre-de-la-Rivière-du-Sud, Saint-Raphaël, Saint-Roch-des-Aulnaies, Saint-Vallier, Sainte-Apolline-de-Patton, Sainte-Euphémie-sur-Rivière-du-Sud, Sainte-Félicité, Sainte-Louise, Sainte-Lucie-de-Beauregard, Sainte-Perpétue, Sainte-Sabine, Tourville
Montréal	Montreal	Baie-d'Urfé, Beaconsfield, Côte Saint-Luc, Dollard-des-Ormeaux, Dorval, Hampstead, Kirkland, L'Île-Dorval, Montreal, Montréal-Est, Montréal-Ouest, Mount Royal, Pointe-Claire, Sainte-Anne-de-Bellevue, Senneville, Westmount
Pontiac	Campbell's Bay	Alleyn-et-Cawood, Bristol, Bryson, Campbell's Bay, Cayamant, Chichester, Clarendon, Fort-Coulonge, L'Ïle-du-Grand-Calumet, L'Isle-aux-Allumettes, Lac-Rapide, Litchfield, Mansfield-et-Pontefract, Otter Lake, Pontiac, Portage-du-Fort, Rapides-des-Joachims, Shawville, Sheenboro, Thorne, Waltham
Québec	Quebec City; Itinerant services: Lévis, Sainte-Croix	Beaumont, Beaupré, Boischatel, Cap-Santé, Château-Richer, Deschaillons-sur-Saint-Laurent, Deschambault-Grondines, Donnacona, Dosquet, Fortierville, Fossambault-sur-le-Lac, L'Ancienne-Lorette, L'Ange-Gardien, Lac-Beauport, Lac-Delage, Lac-Saint-Joseph, Lac-Sergent, Laurier-Station, Leclercville, Lévis, Lotbinière, Neuville, Notre-Dame-des-Anges, Notre-Dame-du-Sacré-Coeur-d'Issoudun, Parisville, Pont-Rouge, Portneuf, Quebec City, Rivière-à-Pierre, Saint-Agapit, Saint-Alban, Saint-Antoine-de-Tilly, Saint-Apollinaire, Saint-Augustin-de-Desmaures, Saint-Basile, Saint-Casimir, Saint-Édouard-de-Lotbinière, Saint-Ferréol-les-Neiges, Saint-Flavien, Saint-François-de-l'Île-d'Orléans, Saint-Gabriel-de-Valcartier, Saint-Gilbert, Saint-Gilles, Saint-Henri, Saint-Janvier-de-Joly, Saint-Jean-de-l'Île-d'Orléans, Saint-Joachim, Saint-Lambert-de-Lauzon, Saint-Laurent-de-l'Île-d'Orléans, Saint-Léonard-de-Portneuf, Saint-Louis-de-Gonzague-du-Cap-Tourmente, Saint-Marc-des-Carrières, Saint-Narcisse-de-Beaurivage, Saint-Patrice-de-Beaurivage, Saint-Pierre-de-l'Île-d'Orléans, Saint-Raymond, Saint-Thuribe, Saint-Tite-des-Caps, Saint-Ubalde, Sainte-Anne-de-Beaupré, Sainte-Brigitte-de-Laval, Sainte-Catherine-de-la-Jacques-Cartier, Sainte-Christine-d'Auvergne, Sainte-Croix, Sainte-Famille, Sainte-Françoise, Sainte-Pétronille, Shannon, Stoneham-et-Tewkesbury, Val-Alain, Villeroy, Wendake
Richelieu	Sorel-Tracy	Baie-du-Febvre, Calixa-Lavallée, Contrecoeur, La Visitation-de-Yamaska, Massueville, Odanak, Pierreville, Saint-Aimé, Saint-Amable, Saint-Antoine-sur-Richelieu, Saint-David, Saint-Elphège, Saint-François-du-Lac, Saint-Gérard-Majella, Saint-Joseph-de-Sorel, Saint-Louis, Saint-Marc-sur-Richelieu, Saint-Marcel-de-Richelieu, Saint-Ours, Saint-Pie-de-Guire, Saint-Robert, Saint-Roch-de-Richelieu, Sainte-Anne-de-Sorel, Sainte-Victoire-de-Sorel, Sorel-Tracy, Varennes, Verchères, Yamaska
Rimouski	Rimouski; Judicial service centres: Amqui, Matane, Mont-Joli	Albertville, Amqui, Baie-des-Sables, Biencourt, Causapscal, Esprit-Saint, Grand-Métis, Grosses-Roches, La Rédemption, La Trinité-des-Monts, Lac-au-Saumon, Lac-des-Aigles, Le Bic, Les Hauteurs, Les Méchins, Matane, Métis-sur-Mer, Mont-Joli, Padoue, Price, Rimouski, Saint-Adelme, Saint-Alexandre-des-Lacs, Saint-Anaclet-de-Lessard, Saint-Charles-Garnier, Saint-Cléophas, Saint-Damase, Saint-Donat, Saint-Eugène-de-Ladrière, Saint-Fabien, Saint-Gabriel-de-Rimouski, Saint-Jean-de-Cherbourg, Saint-Joseph-de-Lepage, Saint-Léandre, Saint-Léon-le-Grand, Saint-Marcellin, Saint-Mathieu-de-Rioux, Saint-Médard, Saint-Moïse, Saint-Narcisse-de-Rimouski, Saint-Noël, Saint-Octave-de-Métis, Saint-René-de-Matane, Saint-Simon, Saint-Tharcisius, Saint-Ulric, Saint-Valérien, Saint-Vianney, Saint-Zénon-du-Lac-Humqui, Sainte-Angèle-de-Mérici, Sainte-Félicité, Sainte-Flavie, Sainte-Florence, Sainte-Irène, Sainte-Jeanne-d'Arc-de-la-Mitis, Sainte-Luce, Sainte-Marguerite, Sainte-Paule, Sayabec, Val-Brillant
Roberval	Roberval; Judicial service centre: Dolbeau-Mistassini	Albanel, Chambord, Dolbeau-Mistassini, Girardville, La Doré, Lac-Bouchette, Mashteuiatsh, Normandin, Notre-Dame-de-Lorette, Péribonka, Roberval, Saint-André-du-Lac-Saint-Jean, Saint-Augustin, Saint-Edmond-les-Plaines, Saint-Eugène-d'Argentenay, Saint-Félicien, Saint-François-de-Sales, Saint-Ludger-de-Milot, Saint-Prime, Saint-Stanislas, Saint-Thomas-Didyme, Sainte-Hedwidge, Sainte-Jeanne-d'Arc
Rouyn-Noranda	Rouyn-Noranda	Rémigny, Rouyn-Noranda
Saint-François	Sherbrooke; Judicial service centre: Magog	Asbestos, Ascot Corner, Ayer's Cliff, Barnston-Ouest, Bury, Chartierville, Cleveland, Coaticook, Compton, Cookshire-Eaton, Danville, Dixville, Dudswell, East Angus, East Hereford, Ham-Nord, Hampden, Hatley, Kingsbury, La Patrie, Lingwick, Magog, Martinville, Melbourne, Newport, North Hatley, Notre-Dame-de-Ham, Ogden, Orford, Richmond, Saint-Adrien, Saint-Camille, Saint-Claude, Saint-Denis-de-Brompton, Saint-Fortunat, Saint-François-Xavier-de-Brompton, Saint-Georges-de-Windsor, Saint-Herménégilde, Saint-Isidore-de-Clifton, Saint-Joseph-de-Ham-Sud, Saint-Malo, Saint-Venant-de-Paquette, Sainte-Catherine-de-Hatley, Sainte-Edwidge-de-Clifton, Saints-Martyrs-Canadiens, Scotstown, Sherbrooke, Stanstead, Stanstead-Est, Stoke, Val-Joli, Waterville, Weedon, Westbury, Windsor, Wotton
Saint-Hyacinthe	Saint-Hyacinthe	Acton Vale, Ange-Gardien, Belœil, La Présentation, Marieville, McMasterville, Mont-Saint-Hilaire, Otterburn Park, Richelieu, Rougemont, Saint-Barnabé-Sud, Saint-Bernard-de-Michaudville, Saint-Césaire, Saint-Charles-sur-Richelieu, Saint-Damase, Saint-Denis-sur-Richelieu, Saint-Dominique, Saint-Hugues, Saint-Hyacinthe, Saint-Jean-Baptiste, Saint-Jude, Saint-Liboire, Saint-Mathias-sur-Richelieu, Saint-Mathieu-de-Beloeil, Saint-Paul-d'Abbotsford, Saint-Pie, Saint-Simon, Saint-Théodore-d'Acton, Sainte-Angèle-de-Monnoir, Sainte-Christine, Sainte-Hélène-de-Bagot, Sainte-Madeleine, Sainte-Marie-Madeleine, Upton
Saint-Maurice	Shawinigan; Other courthouses: La Tuque	Charette, Coucoucache, Grandes-Piles, Hérouxville, La Bostonnais, La Tuque, Lac-aux-Sables, Lac-Édouard, Manawan, Notre-Dame-de-Montauban, Saint-Adelphe, Saint-Alexis-des-Monts, Saint-Barnabé, Saint-Boniface, Saint-Élie-de-Caxton, Saint-Étienne-des-Grès, Saint-Mathieu-du-Parc, Saint-Roch-de-Mékinac, Saint-Sévère, Saint-Séverin, Saint-Tite, Sainte-Thècle, Shawinigan, Trois-Rives, Wemotaci
Témiscamingue	Ville-Marie	Béarn, Belleterre, Duhamel-Ouest, Fugèreville, Guérin, Hunter's Point, Kebaowek, Kipawa, Laforce, Latulippe-et-Gaboury, Laverlochère-Angliers, Lorrainville, Moffet, Nédelec, Notre-Dame-du-Nord, Saint-Bruno-de-Guigues, Saint-Édouard-de-Fabre, Saint-Eugène-de-Guigues, Témiscaming, Timiskaming First Nation, Ville-Marie, Winneway
Terrebonne	Saint-Jérôme; Judicial service centres: Lachute, Sainte-Agathe-des-Monts	Amherst, Arundel, Barkmere, Blainville, Bois-des-Filion, Boisbriand, Brébeuf, Brownsburg-Chatham, Deux-Montagnes, Doncaster, Estérel, Gore, Grenville, Grenville-sur-la-Rouge, Harrington, Huberdeau, Ivry-sur-le-Lac, Kanesatake, Lac-des-Seize-Îles, Lac-Supérieur, Lachute, Lantier, Lorraine, Mille-Isles, Mirabel, Mont-Blanc, Mont-Tremblant, Montcalm, Morin-Heights, Oka, Piedmont, Pointe-Calumet, Prévost, Rosemère, Saint-Adolphe-d'Howard, Saint-André-d'Argenteuil, Saint-Colomban, Saint-Eustache, Saint-Hippolyte, Saint-Jérôme, Saint-Joseph-du-Lac, Saint-Placide, Saint-Sauveur, Sainte-Adèle, Sainte-Agathe-des-Monts, Sainte-Anne-des-Lacs, Sainte-Anne-des-Plaines, Sainte-Lucie-des-Laurentides, Sainte-Marguerite-du-Lac-Masson, Sainte-Marthe-sur-le-Lac, Sainte-Sophie, Sainte-Thérèse, Terrebonne, Val-David, Val-des-Lacs, Val-Morin, Wentworth, Wentworth-Nord
Trois-Rivières	Trois-Rivières; Itinerant services: Nicolet	Aston-Jonction, Batiscan, Bécancour, Champlain, Grand-Saint-Esprit, Lemieux, Louiseville, Manseau, Maskinongé, Nicolet, Notre-Dame-du-Mont-Carmel, Saint-Célestin, Saint-Édouard-de-Maskinongé, Saint-Justin, Saint-Léon-le-Grand, Saint-Luc-de-Vincennes, Saint-Maurice, Saint-Narcisse, Saint-Paulin, Saint-Pierre-les-Becquets, Saint-Prosper, Saint-Samuel, Saint-Stanislas, Saint-Sylvère, Saint-Wenceslas, Sainte-Angèle-de-Prémont, Sainte-Anne-de-la-Pérade, Sainte-Cécile-de-Lévrard, Sainte-Eulalie, Sainte-Geneviève-de-Batiscan, Sainte-Marie-de-Blandford, Sainte-Monique, Sainte-Sophie-de-Lévrard, Sainte-Ursule, Trois-Rivières, Wôlinak, Yamachiche
