= Beauce-Sartigan Regional County Municipality =

Beauce-Sartigan
- Regional county municipality
- Coordinates: 45°58′N 70°39′W
- Country: Canada
- Province: Quebec
- Region: Chaudière-Appalaches
- Effective: January 1, 1982
- County seat: Saint-Georges
- Communities: List: City; Saint-Georges; Municipalities; Courcelles-Saint-Évariste; Saint-Benoît-Labre; Saint-Côme–Linière; Saint-Éphrem-de-Beauce; Saint-Gédéon-de-Beauce; Saint-Honoré-de-Shenley; Saint-Philibert; Saint-Simon-les-Mines; Saint-Théophile; Parishes; Notre-Dame-des-Pins; Saint-Hilaire-de-Dorset; Saint-Martin; Saint-René; Villages; Lac-Poulin; La Guadeloupe

Government
  - Type: Prefecture
  - Prefect: Luc Lemieux

Area
  - Total: 1,977.00 km^{2} (763.32 sq mi)
  - Land: 1,954.50 km^{2} (754.64 sq mi)

Population (2016)
  - Total: 52,406
  - Density: 26.8/km^{2} (69/sq mi)
  - Change 2011-2016: ▲2.7%
  - Dwellings: 24,195
- Time zone: UTC−5 (EST)
  - Summer (DST): UTC−4 (EDT)
- Area codes: 418 and 581
- Website: www.mrc beaucesartigan.com

Beauce-Sartigan is a regional county municipality in the Chaudière-Appalaches region of Quebec, Canada. The county seat is Saint-Georges.

The Chaudière River flows through it. It shares its eastern border with Maine, United States.

The name of the RCM is linked to the historical region of which it is part, Beauce. Sartigan is a distortion of Mechatigan (or Msakkikhan), the name given to the Chaudière River by the native Abenakis.

== Subdivisions ==
There are 16 subdivisions within the RCM:

Cities & Towns (1)

- Saint-Georges

Municipalities (9)

- Courcelles-Saint-Évariste
- Saint-Benoît-Labre
- Saint-Côme–Linière
- Saint-Éphrem-de-Beauce
- Saint-Gédéon-de-Beauce
- Saint-Honoré-de-Shenley
- Saint-Philibert
- Saint-Simon-les-Mines
- Saint-Théophile

Parishes (4)

- Notre-Dame-des-Pins
- Saint-Hilaire-de-Dorset
- Saint-Martin
- Saint-René

Villages (2)

- Lac-Poulin
- La Guadeloupe

== Demographics ==
=== Ethnicity ===
Source: 2016 Census

- 96.2% White
- 2.8% Aboriginal
- 1.0% Visible Minority

== Transportation ==
Highways and numbered routes that run through the municipality, including external routes that start or finish at the county border:

- Autoroutes
  - A-73
- Principal Highways
  - R-108
  - R-173
- Secondary Highways
  - R-204
  - R-269
  - R-271
  - R-275
- External Routes
  - US 201
  - SR 6

== Attractions ==
- Centre d'art de Saint-Georges (Saint-Georges)
- Centre Marie-Fitzbach (Saint-Georges)
- Magasin général Honoré Grégoire (Saint-Honoré-de-Shenley)
- Musée d'autos antiques Victor-Bélanger (Saint-Côme–Linière)
- Pont couvert Perreault (1928) (Notre-Dame-des-Pins)
- Saint-Georges Airport (Saint-Georges)
- Saint-Paul-de-Cumberland Church (1847) (Saint-Simon-les-Mines)
- Village miniature Baillargeon (Saint-Georges)

== See also ==
- List of regional county municipalities and equivalent territories in Quebec
- Beauce, Quebec
