= Saint-Simon-les-Mines =

- Municipality
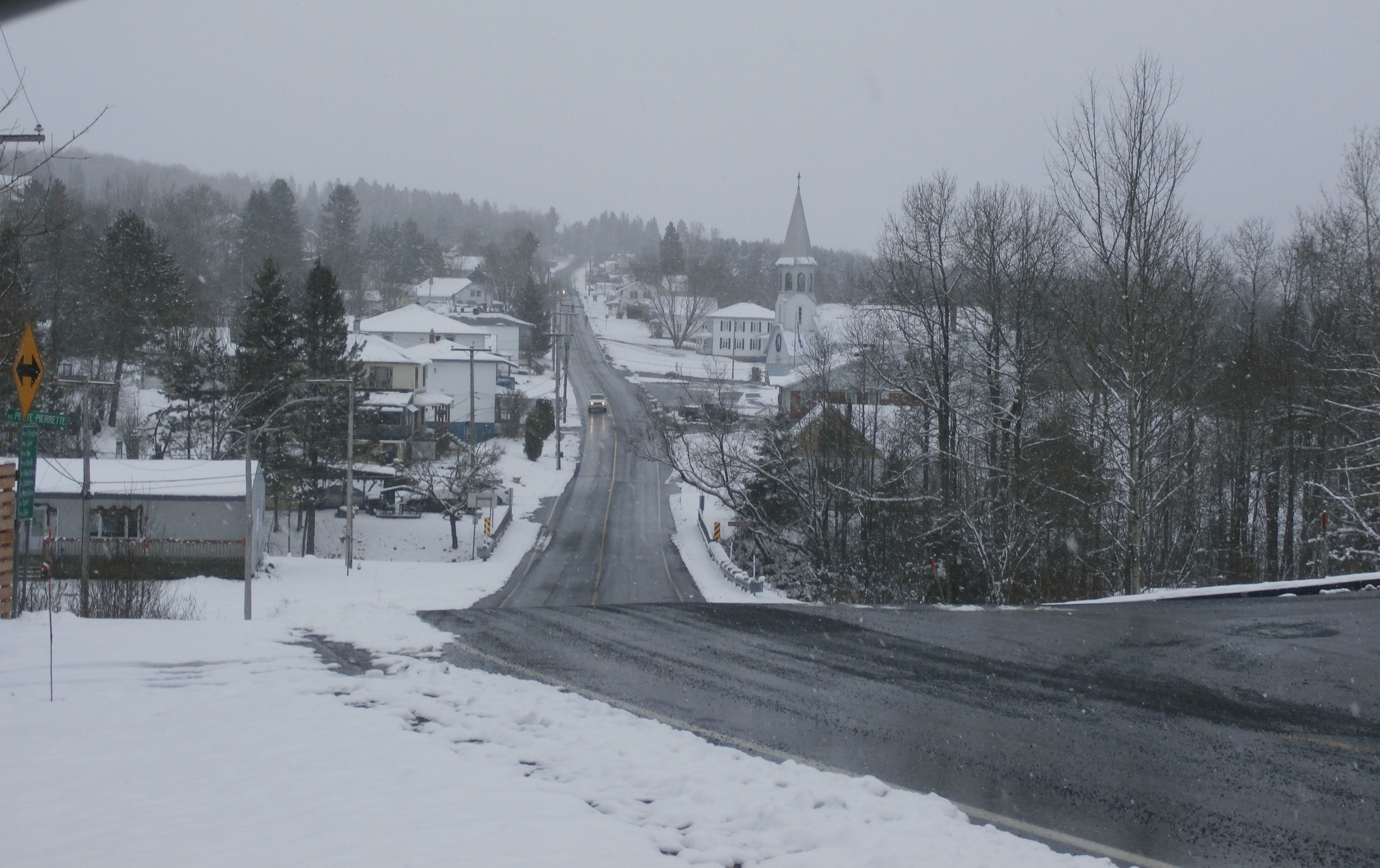
- Rue Principale

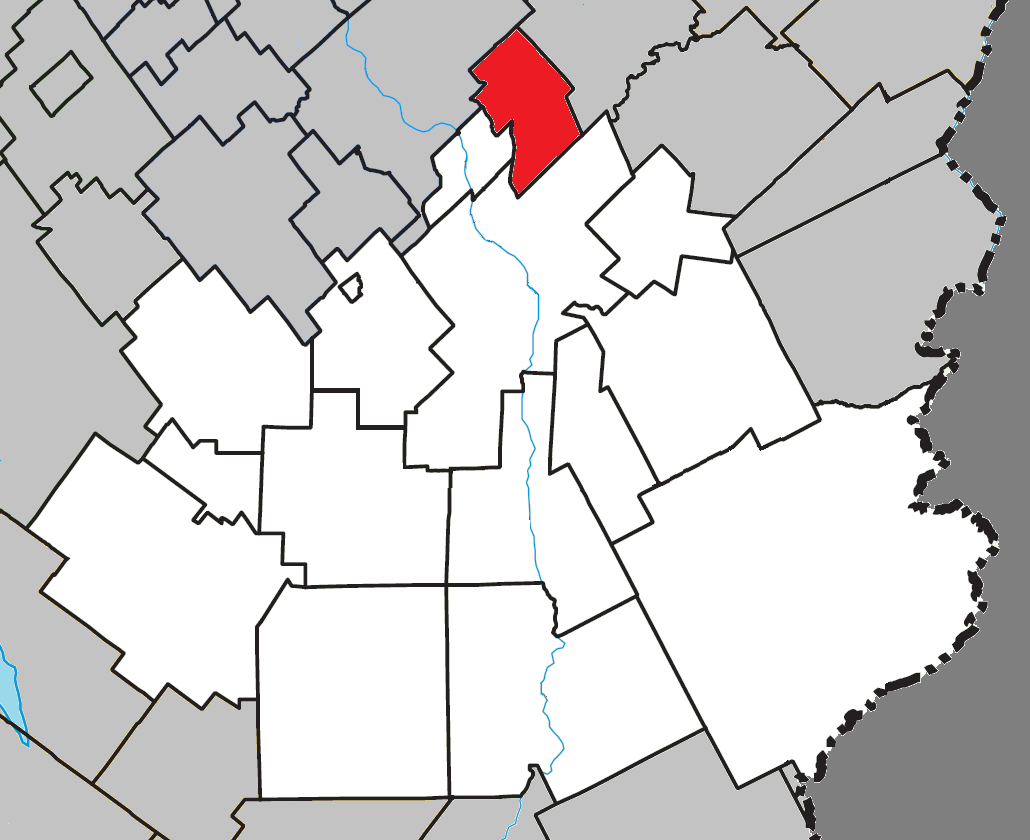
- Location within Beauce-Sartigan RCM.

- Location in southern Quebec.
- Coordinates: 46°13′N 70°41′W
- Country: Canada
- Province: Quebec
- Region: Chaudière-Appalaches
- RCM: Beauce-Sartigan
- Constituted: June 1, 1950

Government
  - Mayor: Julie Hébert
  - Federal riding: Beauce
  - Prov. riding: Beauce-Sud

Area
  - Total: 47.30 km^{2} (18.26 sq mi)
  - Land: 47.43 km^{2} (18.31 sq mi)
- There is an apparent contradiction between two authoritative sources

Population (2021)
  - Total: 573
  - Density: 12.1/km^{2} (31/sq mi)
  - Pop 2016-2021: ▲4.4%
  - Dwellings: 231
- Time zone: UTC−5 (EST)
  - Summer (DST): UTC−4 (EDT)
- Postal code(s): G0M 1K0
- Area codes: 418 and 581
- Highways: No major routes
- Website: www.sslm.ca

Saint-Simon-les-Mines (French pronunciation: [sɛ̃ simɔ̃ le min]) is a municipality in the Municipalité régionale de comté de Beauce-Sartigan in Quebec, Canada. It is part of the Chaudière-Appalaches region and the population is 573 as of 2021. It is named after Simon the Zealot, one of Jesus' apostles, while "les Mines" refers to a small gold mine that was discovered and exploited in the mid-nineteenth century.

== History ==
Saint-Simon-les-Mines was created in 1950 when sections of neighboring municipalities, Saint-Benjamin, Notre-Dame-de-la-Providence, Saint-François and Saint-Georges-Est, were merged to create a new municipality.
