= Saint-Benoît-Labre =

- Municipality
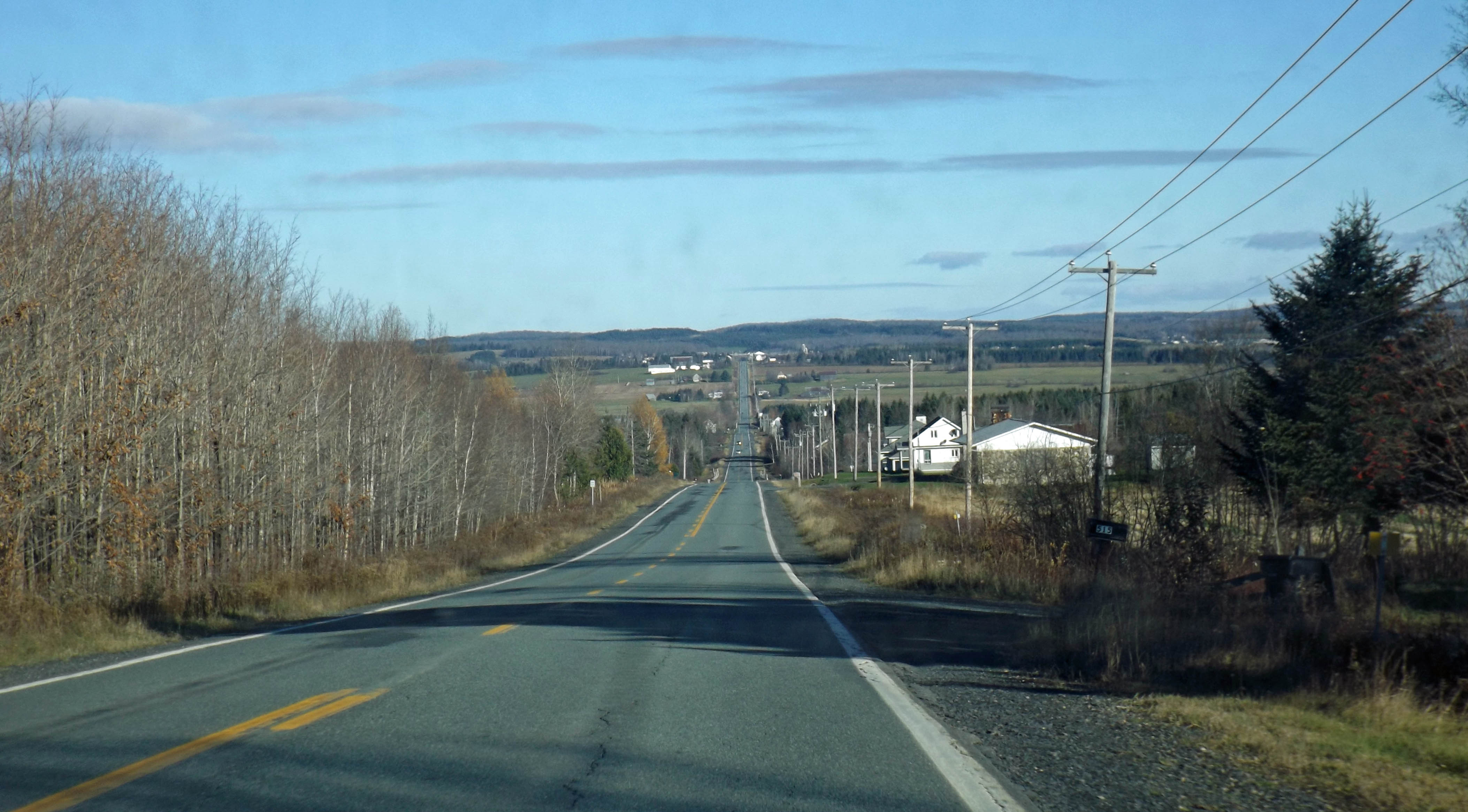

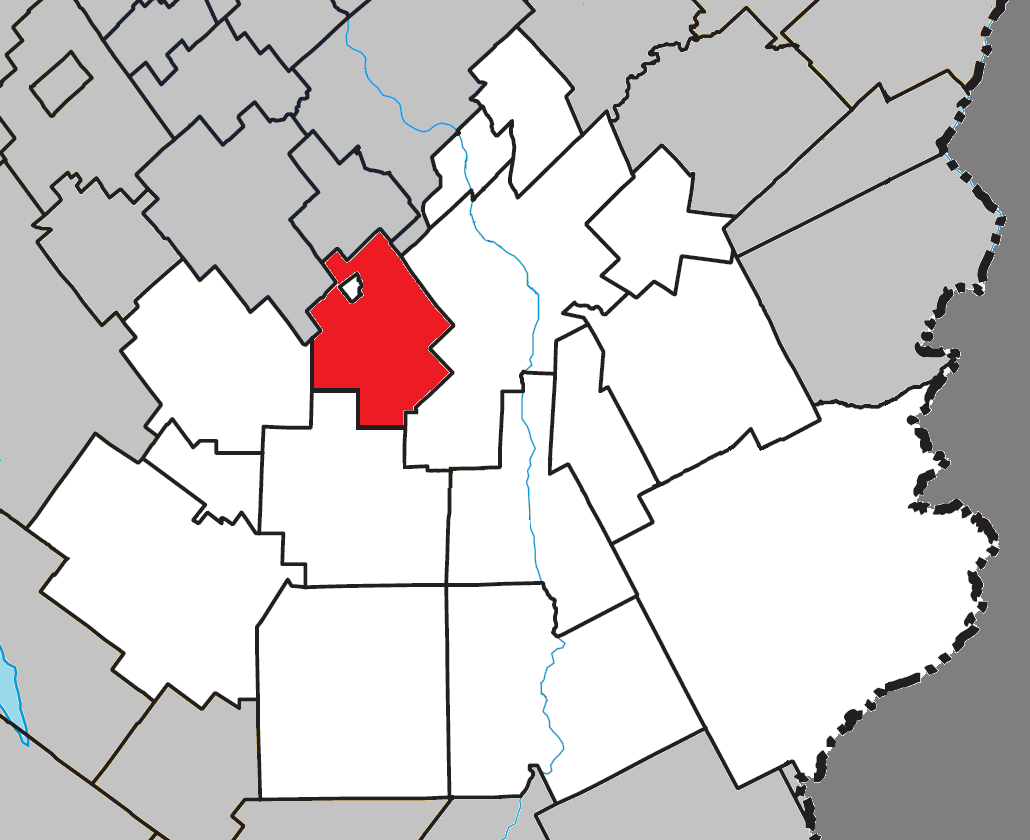
- Location within Beauce-Sartigan RCM.

- Location in southern Quebec.
- Coordinates: 46°04′N 70°48′W
- Country: Canada
- Province: Quebec
- Region: Chaudière-Appalaches
- RCM: Beauce-Sartigan
- Constituted: January 4, 1894

Government
  - Mayor: Jean-Marc Doyon
  - Federal riding: Beauce
  - Prov. riding: Beauce-Sud

Area
  - Total: 86.90 km^{2} (33.55 sq mi)
  - Land: 85.65 km^{2} (33.07 sq mi)

Population (2021)
  - Total: 1,617
  - Density: 18.9/km^{2} (49/sq mi)
  - Pop 2016-2021: ▼0.8%
  - Dwellings: 820
- Time zone: UTC−5 (EST)
  - Summer (DST): UTC−4 (EDT)
- Postal code(s): G0M 1P0
- Area codes: 418 and 581
- Highways: R-271
- Website: www.saint benoitlabre.qc.ca

Saint-Benoît-Labre (French pronunciation: [sɛ̃ bənwa labʁ]) is a municipality in the Municipalité régionale de comté de Beauce-Sartigan in Quebec, Canada. It is part of the Chaudière-Appalaches region and the population is 1,617 as of 2021. It is named after Benedict Joseph Labre.

In 2001 a group of Cistercian nuns moved from Saint-Romuald, Quebec to a newly constructed Bon Conseil Abbey (French: Notre-Dame du Bon Conseil) in Saint-Benoît-Labre, where they make chocolate.

The territory of Saint-Benoît-Labre surrounds the village of Lac-Poulin.

== History ==
Saint-Benoît-Labre was created in 1894 when sections of Saint-Georges, Saint-Victor-de-Tring, Saint-François and Shenley were split and merged to create a new municipality. In 1993, the status of Saint-Benoît-Labre was changed from a parish municipality to a regular municipality.

== Geography ==
The Pozer River flows through the municipality from the south-west to the north-east.
