= Saint-René, Quebec =

Saint-René
- Parish municipality
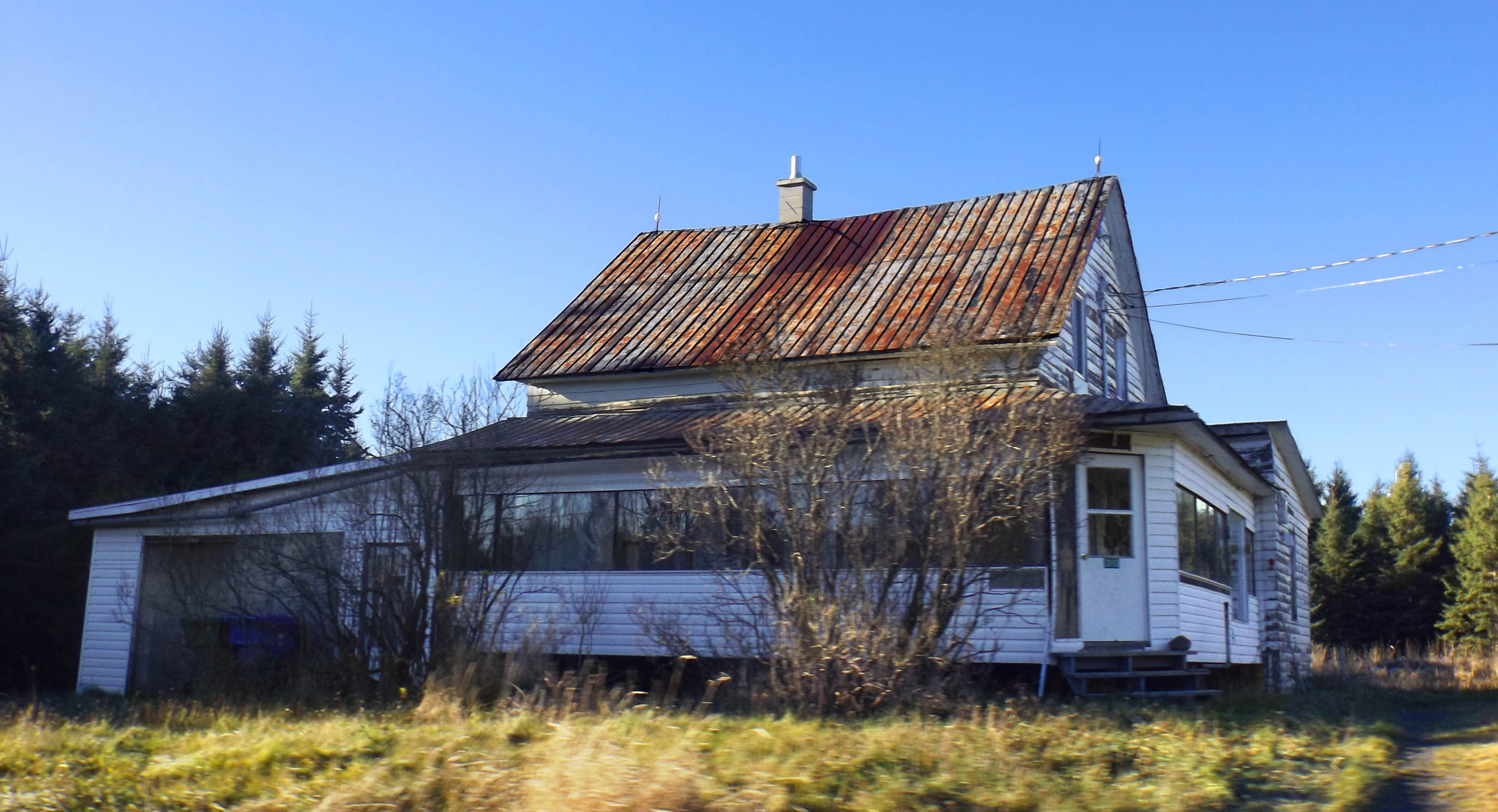
- Classical old house of Beauce

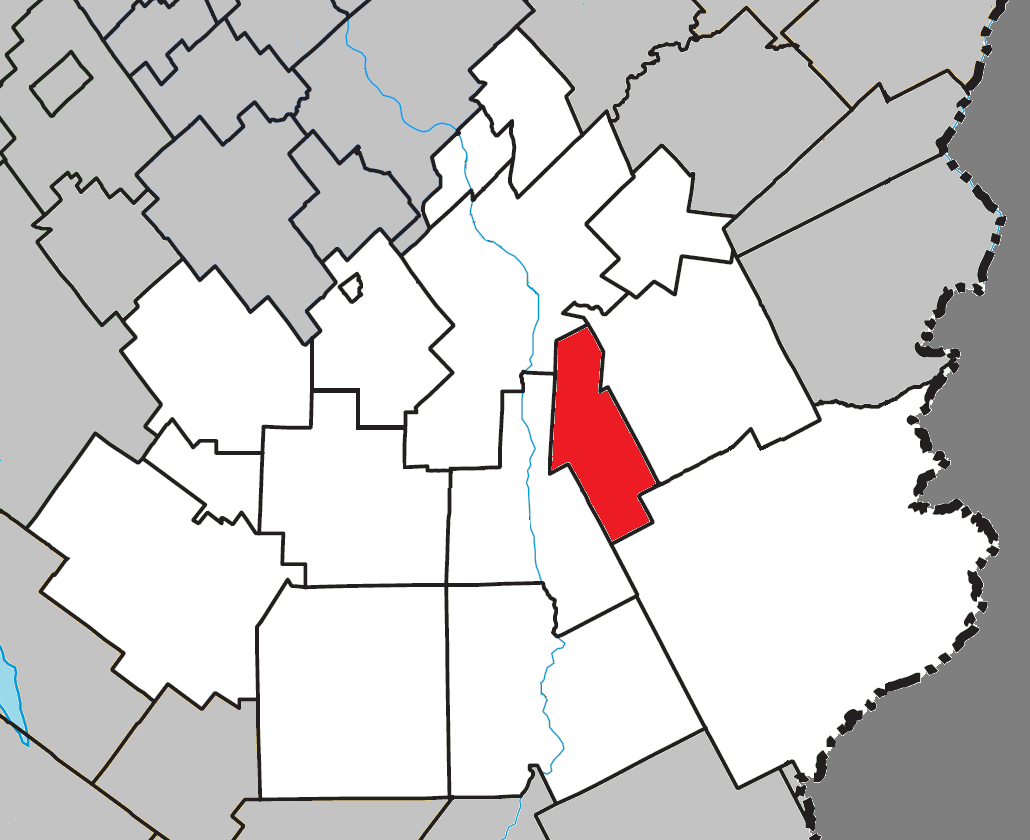
- Location within Beauce-Sartigan RCM.

- Location in southern Quebec.
- Coordinates: 46°01′N 70°37′W
- Country: Canada
- Province: Quebec
- Region: Chaudière-Appalaches
- RCM: Beauce-Sartigan
- Constituted: January 1, 1945
- Named for: René Goupil

Government
  - Mayor: Berthier Grondin
  - Federal riding: Beauce
  - Prov. riding: Beauce-Sud

Area
  - Total: 61.40 km^{2} (23.71 sq mi)
  - Land: 61.54 km^{2} (23.76 sq mi)
- There is an apparent contradiction between two authoritative sources

Population (2021)
  - Total: 946
  - Density: 15.4/km^{2} (40/sq mi)
  - Pop 2016-2021: ▲27%
  - Dwellings: 373
- Time zone: UTC−5 (EST)
  - Summer (DST): UTC−4 (EDT)
- Postal code(s): G0M 1Z0
- Area codes: 418 and 581
- Highways: No major routes
- Website: www.st-rene.ca

Saint-René (French pronunciation: [sɛ̃ ʁəne]) is a parish in the Beauce-Sartigan Regional County Municipality in Quebec, Canada. It is part of the Chaudière-Appalaches region and the population is 946 as of 2021. It is named after Canadian martyr René Goupil.

== History ==
Saint-René was created in 1945 when some territories from Saint-Georges, Saint-Côme-de-Kennebec and Saint-Martin were merged to create a new municipality.

== Demographics ==
In the 2021 Census of Population conducted by Statistics Canada, Saint-René had a population of 946 living in 351 of its 373 total private dwellings, a change of 27% from its 2016 population of 745. With a land area of 61.54 km^{2} (23.76 sq mi), it had a population density of 15.4/km^{2} (39.8/sq mi) in 2021.
