= Saint-Eugène-d'Argentenay =

- Municipality
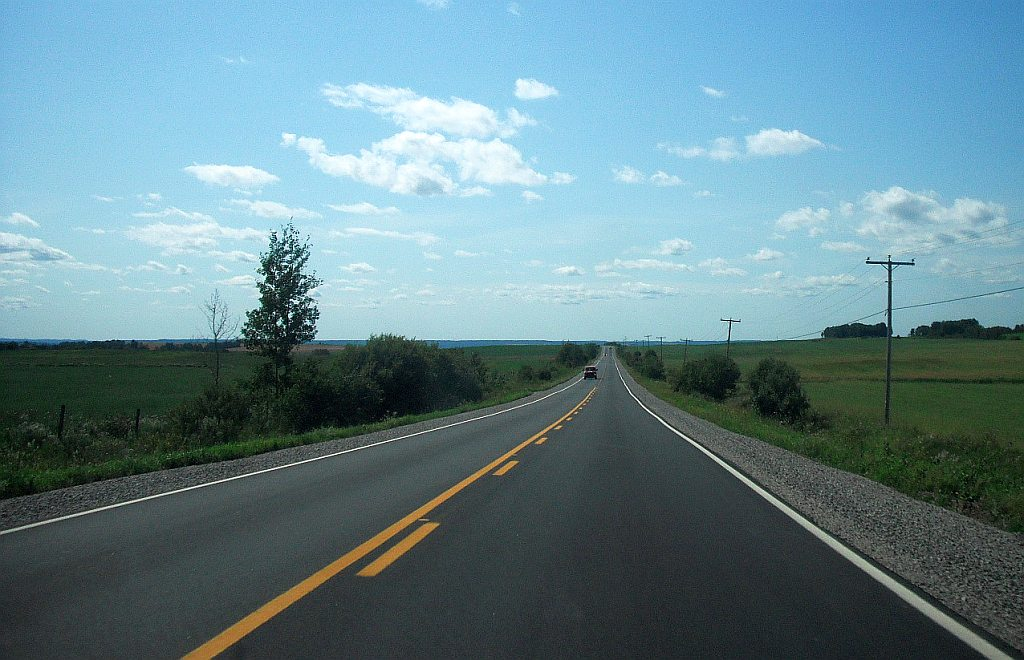

- Location in Saguenay–Lac-Saint-Jean Quebec.
- Coordinates: 48°59′N 72°17′W
- Country: Canada
- Province: Quebec
- Region: Saguenay–Lac-Saint-Jean
- RCM: Maria-Chapdelaine
- Settled: 1895
- Constituted: November 14, 1923

Government
  - Mayor: Gilles Dufour
  - Federal riding: Jonquière—Hébertville—Pays-des-Bleuets
  - Prov. riding: Roberval

Area
  - Total: 86.40 km^{2} (33.36 sq mi)
  - Land: 87.05 km^{2} (33.61 sq mi)
- There is an apparent contradiction between two authoritative sources

Population (2021)
  - Total: 487
  - Density: 5.6/km^{2} (15/sq mi)
  - Pop (2016–21): ▼0.2%
  - Dwellings: 221
- Time zone: UTC−5 (EST)
  - Summer (DST): UTC−4 (EDT)
- Postal code(s): G0W 1B0
- Area codes: 418 and 581

Saint-Eugène-d'Argentenay (French pronunciation: [sɛ̃t‿øʒɛn daʁʒɑ̃tnɛ]) is a municipality in the Canadian province of Quebec, located within the regional county municipality of Maria-Chapdelaine. The municipality had a population of 487 as of the Canada 2021 Census. Prior to 1997 it was known simply as Saint-Eugène.

== Demographics ==
Population trend:

- Population in 2021: 487 (2011 to 2016 population change: -0.2%)
- Population in 2016: 488 (2011 to 2016 population change: -10.6%)
- Population in 2011: 546 (2006 to 2011 population change: -4.5%)
- Population in 2006: 572
- Population in 2001: 608
- Population in 1996: 651
- Population in 1991: 692
- Population in 1986: 715
- Population in 1981: 689
- Population in 1976: 669
- Population in 1971: 751
- Population in 1966: 1,024
- Population in 1961: 1,067
- Population in 1956: 1,137
- Population in 1951: 1,058
- Population in 1941: 945
- Population in 1931: 556

Private dwellings occupied by usual residents: 206 (total dwellings: 221)

Mother tongue:

- English as first language: 1%
- French as first language: 99%
- English and French as first language: 1%
- Other as first language: 0%
