= Lac-Poulin =

- Village municipality
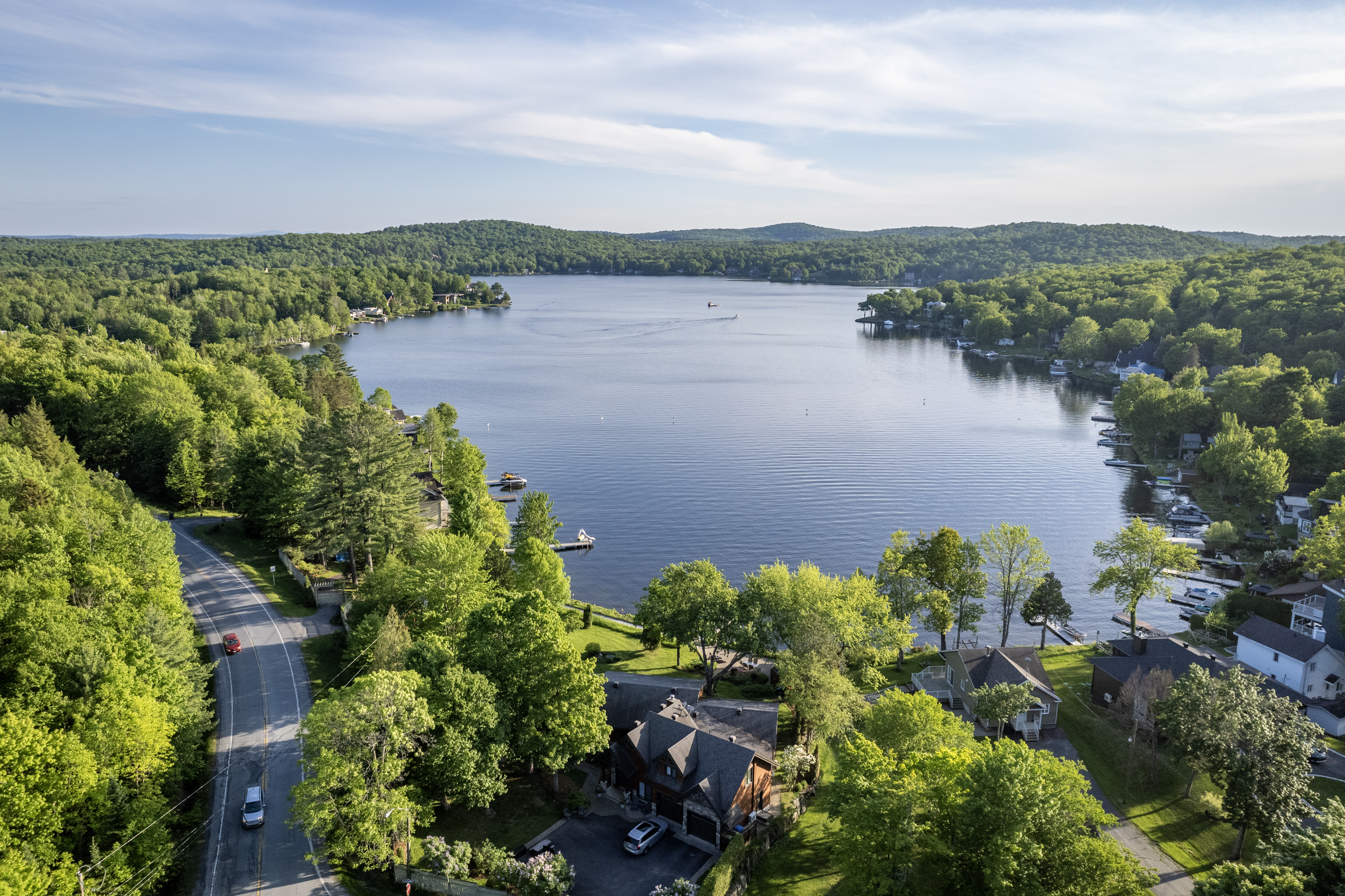

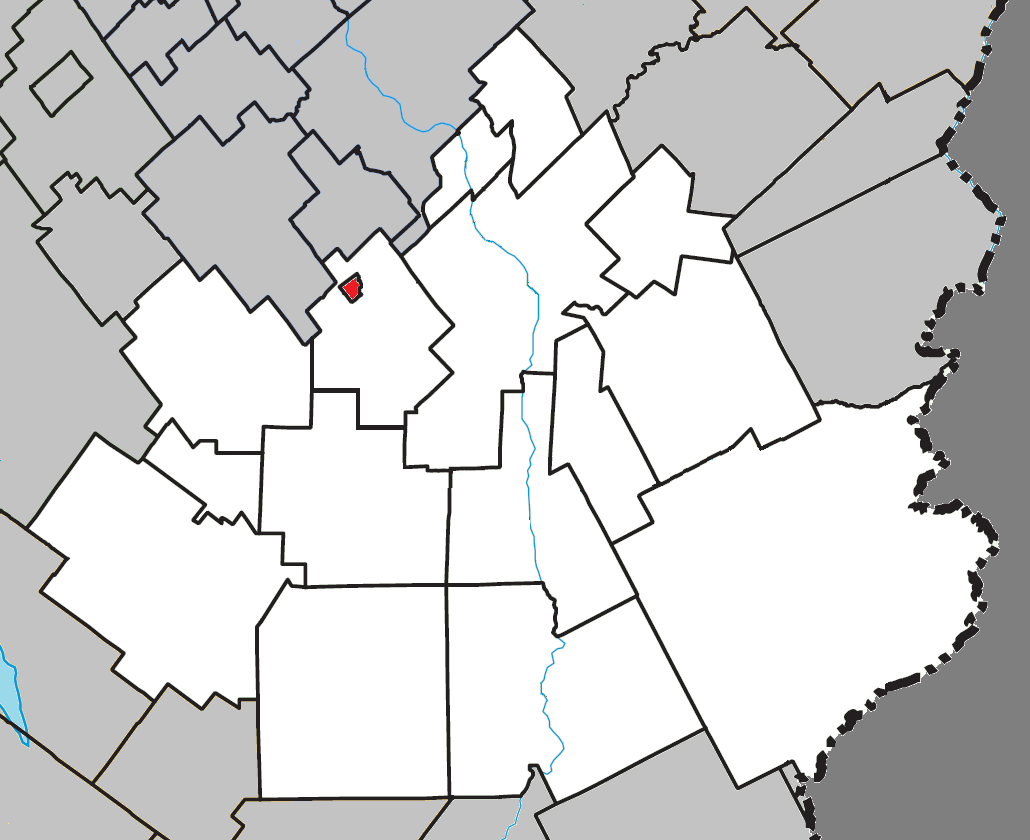
- Location within Beauce-Sartigan RCM.

- Location in southern Quebec.
- Coordinates: 46°06′N 70°49′W
- Country: Canada
- Province: Quebec
- Region: Chaudière-Appalaches
- RCM: Beauce-Sartigan
- Constituted: March 5, 1959

Government
  - Mayor: Denis Levesque
  - Federal riding: Beauce
  - Prov. riding: Beauce-Sud

Area
  - Total: 1.60 km^{2} (0.62 sq mi)
  - Land: 0.88 km^{2} (0.34 sq mi)

Population (2021)
  - Total: 171
  - Density: 195.3/km^{2} (506/sq mi)
  - Pop 2016-2021: ▲16.3%
  - Dwellings: 154
- Time zone: UTC−5 (EST)
  - Summer (DST): UTC−4 (EDT)
- Postal code(s): G0M 1P0
- Area codes: 418 and 581
- Highways: No major routes
- Census profile
- MAMROT info: 29095
- Toponymie info: 33285
- Website: www.lacpoulin.ca

Lac-Poulin (French pronunciation: [lak pulɛ̃]) is a village in the Beauce-Sartigan Regional County Municipality in the Chaudière-Appalaches region of Quebec, Canada. Its population was 171 as of 2021. Lac-Poulin is an enclave of Saint-Benoît-Labre.

Lac-Poulin is named after the lake it surrounds (Poulin), which was named after the first settler Claude Poulin. The first settlers Claude Poulin (1614-1687), a carpenter, was born in St Maclou, Rouen, Normandie, France and his wife Jeanne Mercier (1621-1687) was born in Luçon, Eure-et-Loir, Centre, France. Poulin is a common last name in the region. The village is mainly a summer vacation site.

== History ==
Lac-Poulin was created in 1959 when it split away from Saint-Benoit-Labre.

== Geography ==
Lake Poulin covers most of the municipality, which is landlocked within Saint-Benoît-Labre.

== Demographics ==
In the 2021 Census of Population conducted by Statistics Canada, Lac-Poulin had a population of 171 living in 75 of its 154 total private dwellings, a change of 16.3% from its 2016 population of 147. With a land area of 0.88 km^{2} (0.34 sq mi), it had a population density of 194.3/km^{2} (503.3/sq mi) in 2021.
