= Saint-Hilaire-de-Dorset =

- Parish municipality
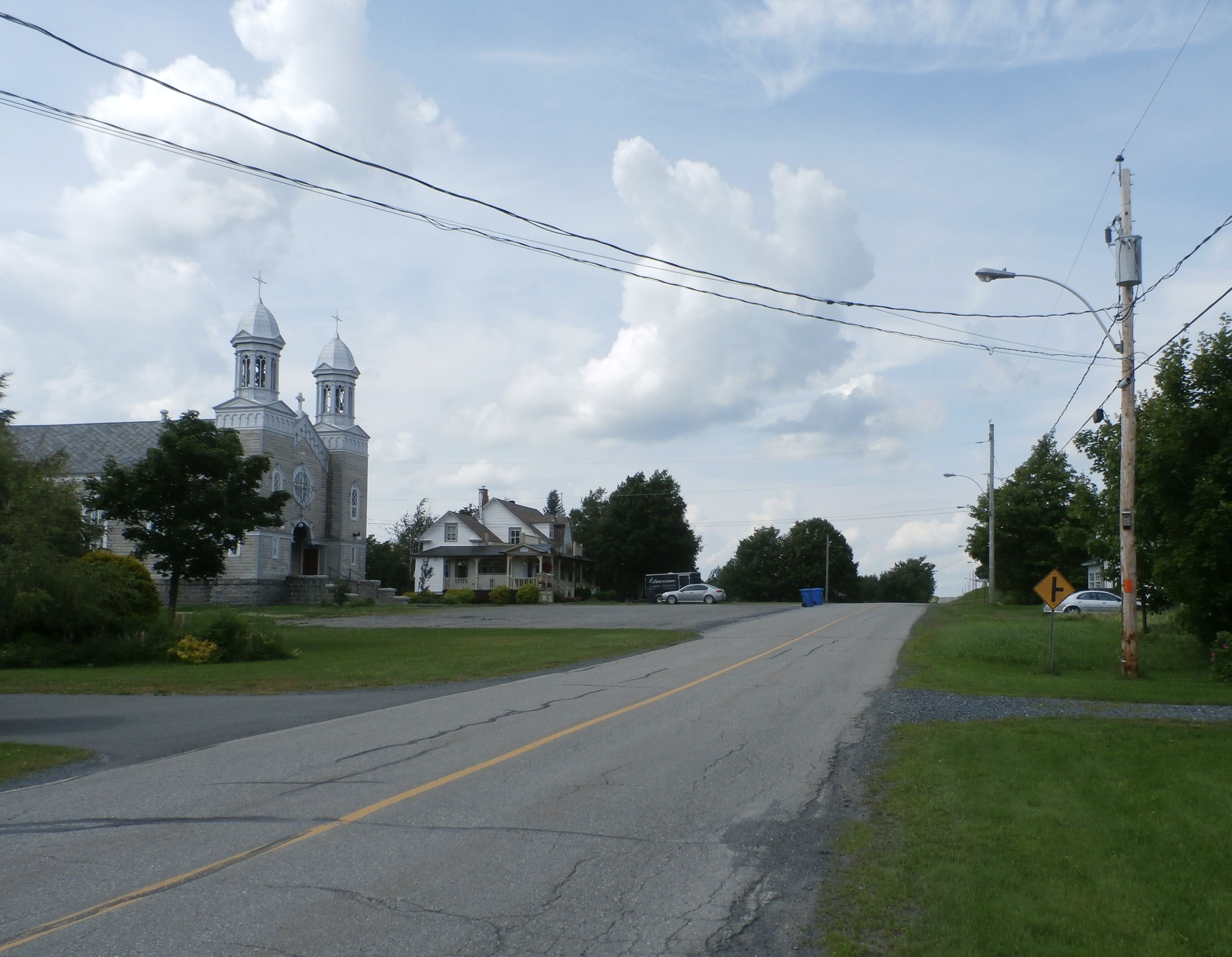

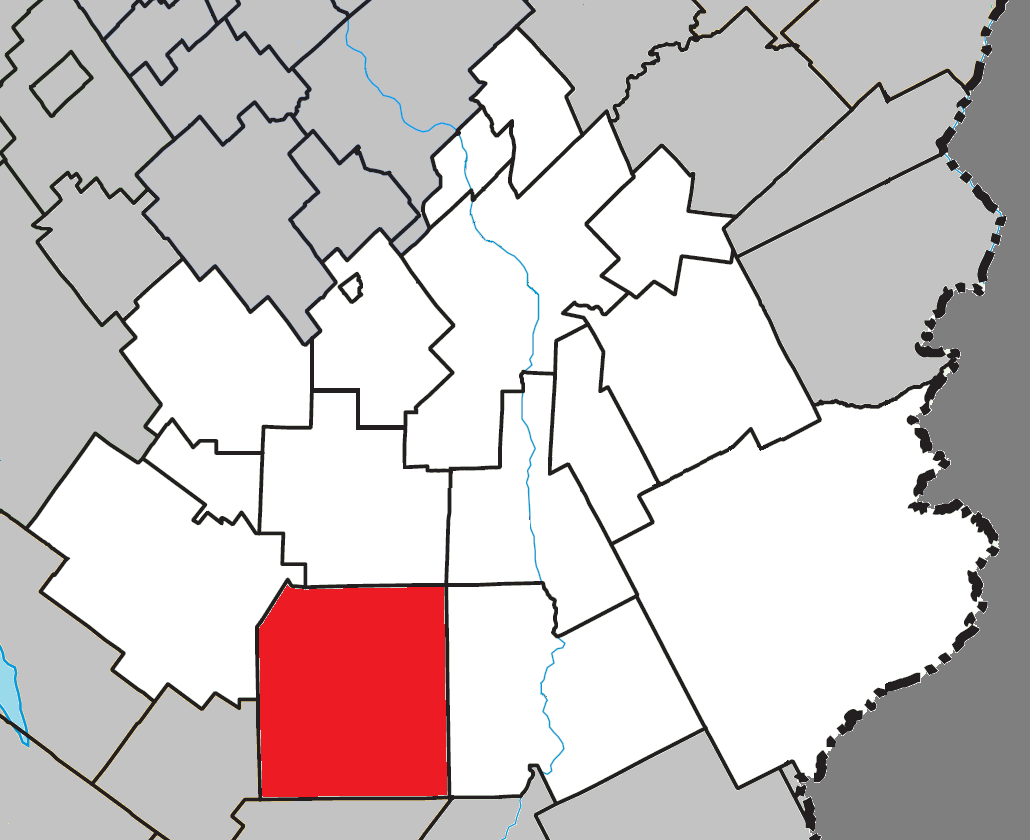
- Location within Beauce-Sartigan RCM.

- Location in southern Quebec.
- Coordinates: 45°52′N 70°51′W
- Country: Canada
- Province: Quebec
- Region: Chaudière-Appalaches
- RCM: Beauce-Sartigan
- Constituted: April 12, 1916

Government
  - Mayor: Michel Breton
  - Federal riding: Beauce
  - Prov. riding: Beauce-Sud

Area
  - Total: 189.40 km^{2} (73.13 sq mi)
  - Land: 186.77 km^{2} (72.11 sq mi)

Population (2021)
  - Total: 96
  - Density: 0.5/km^{2} (1.3/sq mi)
  - Pop 2016-2021: ▲1.1%
  - Dwellings: 56
- Time zone: UTC−5 (EST)
  - Summer (DST): UTC−4 (EDT)
- Postal code(s): G0M 1G0
- Area codes: 418 and 581
- Highways: No major routes
- Website: www.sthilairededorset.ca

Saint-Hilaire-de-Dorset is a parish municipality in the Beauce-Sartigan Regional County Municipality in the Chaudière-Appalaches region of Quebec, Canada.

The municipality is named after Hilary of Poitiers and the county of Dorset in England.

== History ==
Saint-Hilaire-de-Dorset was officially created on March 28, 1946. Thirty years after the creation of the religious parish.

== Demographics ==
In the 2021 Census of Population conducted by Statistics Canada, Saint-Hilaire-de-Dorset had a population of 96 living in 44 of its 56 total private dwellings, a change of 1.1% from its 2016 population of 95. With a land area of 186.77 km^{2} (72.11 sq mi), it had a population density of 0.5/km^{2} (1.3/sq mi) in 2021.

Historical census populations – Saint-Hilaire-de-Dorset

Year	Pop.	±%
1951	310	—
1956	291	−6.1%
1961	260	−10.7%
1966	229	−11.9%
1971	198	−13.5%
1976	154	−22.2%
1981	142	−7.8%
1986	131	−7.7%

Year	Pop.	±%
1991	125	−4.6%
1996	121	−3.2%
2001	109	−9.9%
2006	104	−4.6%
2011	99	−4.8%
2016	95	−4.0%
2021	96	+1.1%

Source: Statistics Canada

Private dwellings occupied by usual residents (2021): 44 (total dwellings: 56)
