= La Guadeloupe =

- Village municipality
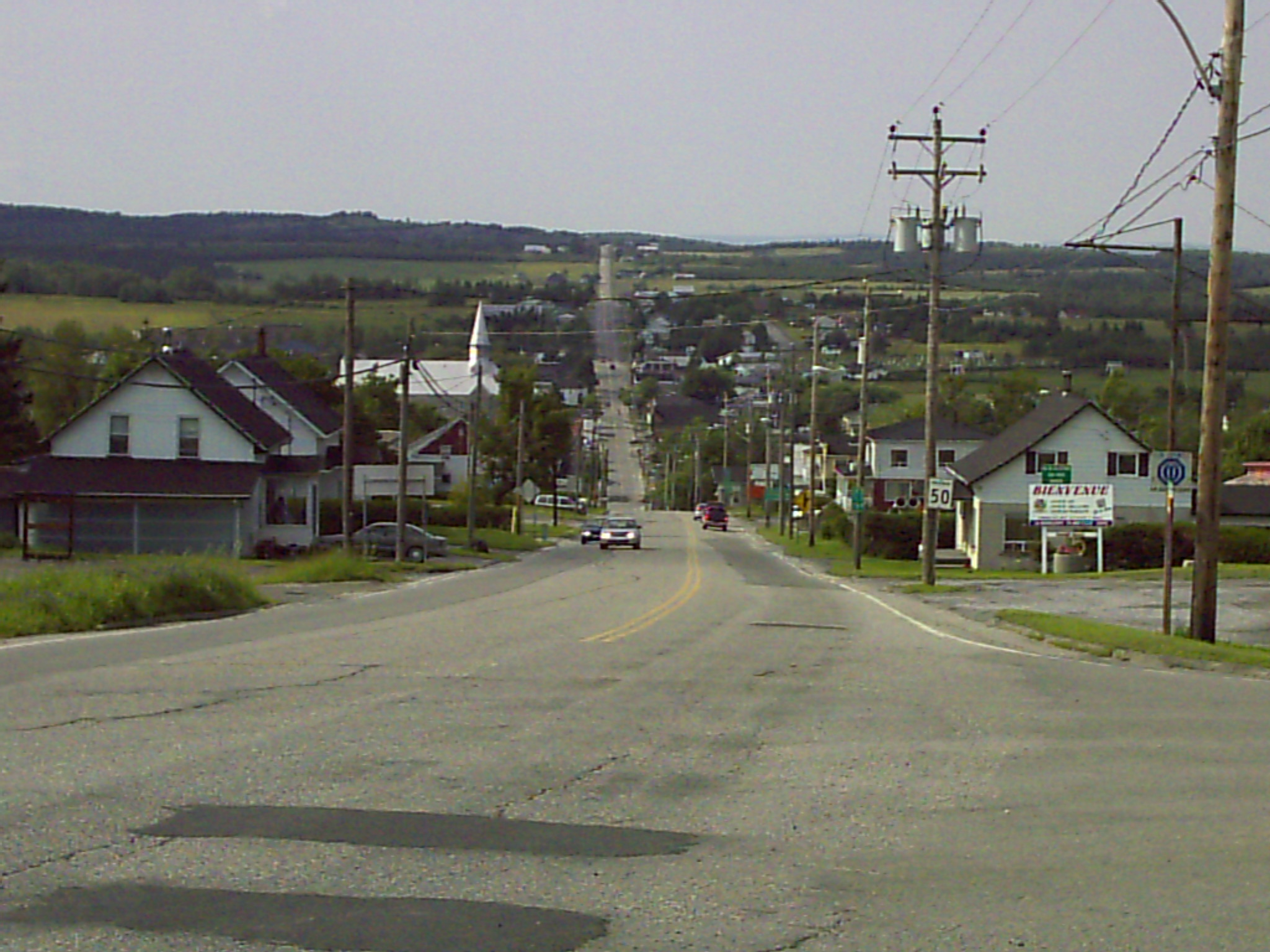

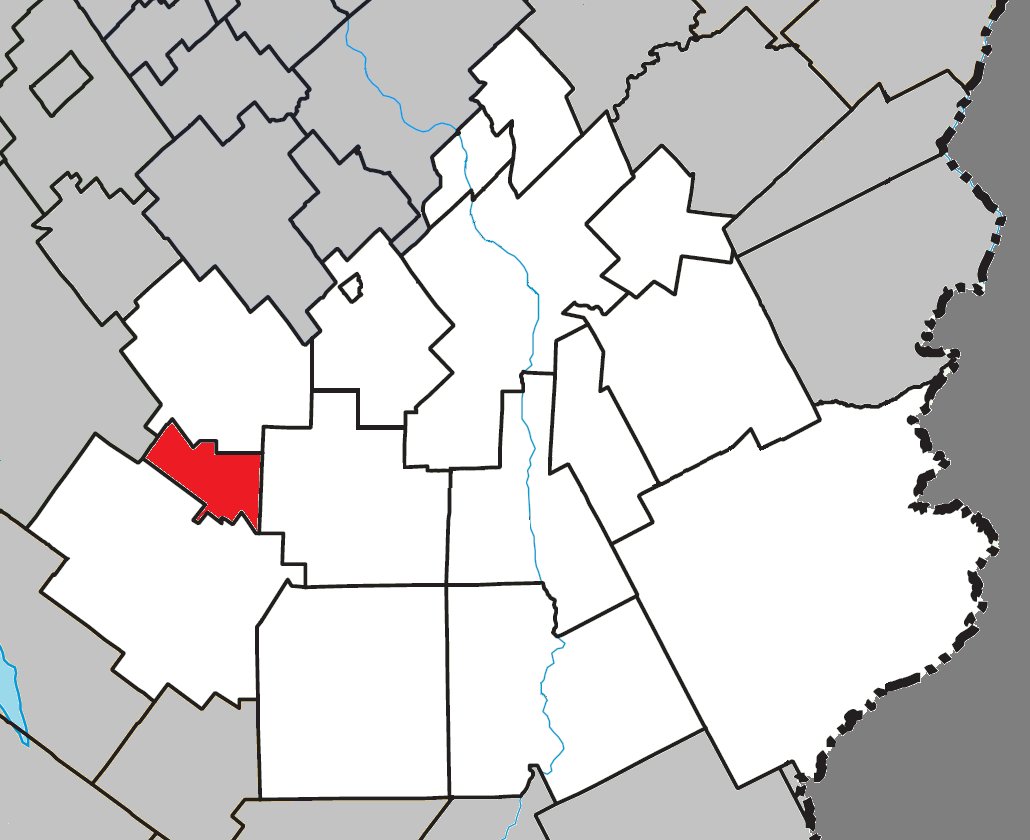
- Location within Beauce-Sartigan RCM

- Location in southern Quebec
- Coordinates: 45°57′N 70°56′W
- Country: Canada
- Province: Quebec
- Region: Chaudière-Appalaches
- RCM: Beauce-Sartigan
- Constituted: August 6, 1929

Government
  - Mayor: Vanessa Roy
  - Federal riding: Beauce
  - Prov. riding: Beauce-Sud

Area
  - Total: 32.70 km^{2} (12.63 sq mi)
  - Land: 32.84 km^{2} (12.68 sq mi)

Population (2021)
  - Total: 1,805
  - Density: 55/km^{2} (140/sq mi)
  - Pop 2016-2021: ▲5.7%
  - Dwellings: 860
- Time zone: UTC−5 (EST)
  - Summer (DST): UTC−4 (EDT)
- Postal code(s): G0M 1G0
- Area codes: 418 and 581
- Highways: R-108; R-269
- Census profile
- MAMROT info: 29030
- Toponymie info: 33607
- Website: www.munlaguadeloupe.qc.ca

La Guadeloupe (French pronunciation: [la ɡwadlup]) is a village in the Beauce-Sartigan Regional County Municipality in the Chaudière-Appalaches region of Quebec, Canada. Its population was 1,805 as of 2022. The town is listed as a Village rélais.

Originally named Saint-Évariste-Station, on 9 July 1949 the name was changed to La Guadeloupe.

== Demographics ==
In the 2021 Census of Population conducted by Statistics Canada, La Guadeloupe had a population of 1,805 living in 814 of its 860 total private dwellings, an increase of 5.7% from its 2016 population of 1,707. With a land area of 32.84 km^{2} (12.68 sq mi), it had a population density of 55.0/km^{2} (142.4/sq mi) in 2021.

=== Population ===
Population trend:

Census	Population	Change (%)
2021	1,805	▲5.7%
2016	1,707	▼4.5%
2011	1,787	▲1.6%
2006	1,758	▲2.4%
2001	1,716	▼3.2%
1996	1,772	▲3%
1991	1,721	▲0.3%
1986	1,716	▲1.4%
1981	1,692	▼6.2%
1976	1,804	▼6.7%
1971	1,934	▲3%
1966	1,877	▲8.6%
1961	1,728	▲16.2%
1956	1,487	▲12.6%
1951	1,321	▲110.7%
1941	627	▼4.1%
1931	654	N/A

=== Language ===
Mother tongue language (2021)

Language	Population	Pct (%)
French only	1,645	94.0%
English only	5	0.3%
Both English and French	10	0.6%
Other languages	90	5.1%
