= Saint-Philibert, Quebec =

Saint-Philibert
- Municipality

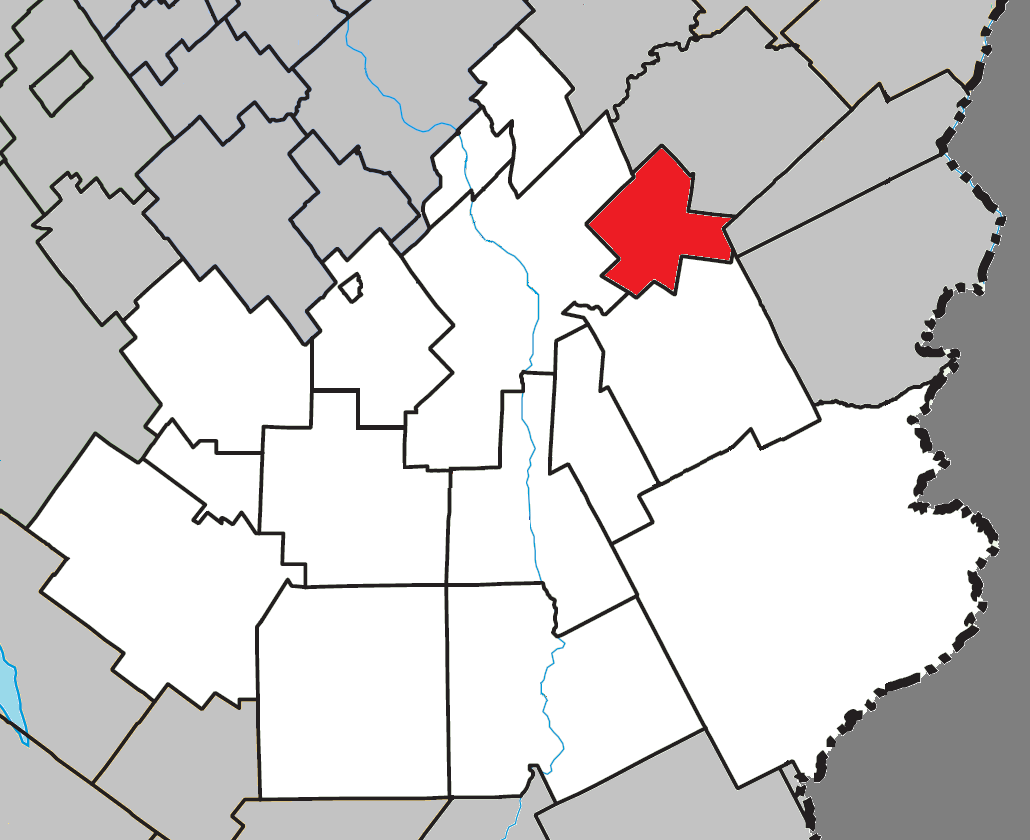
- Location within Beauce-Sartigan RCM.

- Location in southern Quebec.
- Coordinates: 46°08′N 70°33′W
- Country: Canada
- Province: Quebec
- Region: Chaudière-Appalaches
- RCM: Beauce-Sartigan
- Constituted: February 25, 1921

Government
  - Mayor: Jacques Bégin
  - Federal riding: Beauce
  - Prov. riding: Beauce-Sud

Area
  - Total: 56.60 km^{2} (21.85 sq mi)
  - Land: 57.16 km^{2} (22.07 sq mi)
- There is an apparent contradiction between two authoritative sources

Population (2021)
  - Total: 379
  - Density: 6.6/km^{2} (17/sq mi)
  - Pop 2016-2021: ▲2.7%
  - Dwellings: 160
- Time zone: UTC−5 (EST)
  - Summer (DST): UTC−4 (EDT)
- Postal code(s): G0M 1X0
- Area codes: 418 and 581
- Highways: No major routes
- Website: www.st-philibert.qc.ca

Saint-Philibert (French pronunciation: [sɛ̃ filibɛʁ]) is a municipality in the Municipalité régionale de comté de Beauce-Sartigan in Quebec, Canada. It is part of the Chaudière-Appalaches region. The population is 379 as of 2021. It is named after reverend François-Philibert Lamontagne, who promoted the parish at the time of the church construction in 1919.

A fire destroyed this same church on February 14, 2009.
