= Area codes 418, 581, and 367 =

Area codes covering eastern Quebec, Canada

Coordinates: 50.911°N 68.782°W

Quebec City

Area codes 418, 581, and 367 are telephone area codes in the North American Numbering Plan (NANP) for the eastern portion of the Canadian province of Quebec. Area code 418 was originally assigned to the numbering plan area, but all three area codes now form an overlay plan for this territory. Cities in the numbering plan area include Quebec City, Saguenay, Lévis, Rimouski, Saint-Georges, Alma, Thetford Mines, Sept-Îles, Baie-Comeau and Rivière-du-Loup. Also served are the Gaspé Peninsula, Côte-Nord, southeastern Mauricie, and the tiny hamlet of Estcourt Station, in the U.S. state of Maine.

== History ==
Ontario and Quebec were the only provinces that received assignments of multiple area codes by the American Telephone and Telegraph Company (AT&T) when the original North American area codes were created in 1947.

The eastern part of Quebec received area code 418, while area code 514 was assigned for the western part. Nominally, northwestern Quebec, one of the few areas of North America without telephone service, was reassigned from area code 514 to area code 418 in 1957. From the 1950s to the 1970s, area code 418 was also the area code for the eastern Northwest Territories. However, in the 1970s, as direct distance dialling was introduced to the far northern and western portions of 418, those areas were reassigned to area code 819.

Despite Quebec City's rapid growth, by the turn of the millennium, area code 418 was the last of Quebec and Ontario's original four area codes not to have been split. By 2006, however, area code 418 was on the brink of exhaustion because of Canada's system of number allocation. Every competitive local exchange carrier is allocated blocks of 10,000 numbers, which correspond to a single three-digit prefix, for every rate centre in which it plans to offer service, even for small hamlets. Once a number is assigned to a carrier and rate centre, it cannot be moved elsewhere even if a rate centre has more than enough numbers to serve it. That resulted in thousands of wasted numbers, a problem that was worsened by the proliferation of cellphones and pagers, especially in the larger cities. Additionally, a number of "megacities" created in 2002 are split between multiple rate centres, which have never been amalgamated. For example, Saguenay is split between four rate centres.

In 2007, the CRTC assigned area code 581 as an overlay for 418. The implementation of area code 581 began on June 21, 2008, with the start of a permissive dialling period during which local calls could be made with both seven and ten digits. Ten-digit dialling became mandatory in eastern Quebec on September 6, 2008.

By 2016, area codes 418 and 581 exceeded once again the threshold for relief planning because of further proliferation of mobile services. In 2017, the CRTC assigned area code 367 as a second overlay code for eastern Quebec. It entered service in 2018. With that action, a total of 23.4 million telephone numbers had been allocated to only 1.8 million people.

The major incumbent local exchange carriers in the area are Bell Canada, Bell Aliant, Telus (formerly Quebec-Telephone) and Vidéotron.

After an August 2027 exhaust date for central office codes was determined for the 367/418/581 overlay complex, a relief planning committee was initiated in January 2025, which produced a draft plan with a target relief date of February 27, 2027, and reserved area code 273 as the fourth area code for the region in May 2025, The draft plan was approved by the CRTC on October 10, 2025, and area code 273 was assigned by the North American Numbering Plan Administrator (NANPA).

== Places and central office codes ==
- Adstock: (418) 422 (581) 634
- Aguanish: (418) 533 (581) 299
- Albanel: (418) 279 501 (581) 601
- Albertville: see Causapscal
- Alma: (418) 212 301 319 321 347 442 450 480 481 482 487 662 668 669 719 720 758 769 (581) 200 216 230 265 431 533 598 728 828
- Amqui: (418) 330 629 631 713 (581) 335
- Armagh: (418) 466 (581) 328
- Auclair: see Témiscouata-sur-le-Lac
- Baie-Comeau: (418) 280 282 293 294 295 296 297 298 378 445 589 921 (581) 381 642 726 823 829 929 987
- Baie-des-Sables: (418) 772 (581) 396
- Baie-Johan-Beetz: (418) 539 (581) 298
- Baie-Saint-Paul: (418) 200 219 240 435 436 760 (581) 237
- Baie-Sainte-Catherine: (418) 237 (581) 236
- Baie-Trinité: (418) 920 939
- Batiscan: see Sainte-Geneviève-de-Batiscan
- Beauceville: (418) 217 774 (581) 420 813
- Beaulac-Garthby: (418) 458 (581) 228 330 835
- Beaumont: see Lévis
- Beaupré: (418) 702 746 827
- Bégin: see Saint-Ambroise
- Berthier-sur-Mer: see Saint-François-de-la-Rivière-du-Sud
- Biencourt: (418) 499 (581) 373
- Blanc-Sablon: (418) 461 (581) 297
- Boischatel: (418) 406 762 822 (581) 538
- Bonaventure: (418) 530 534 (581) 364 630 827
- Bonne-Espérance: (418) 379 (581) 296
- Cacouna: see Rivière-du-Loup
- Cap-Chat: (418) 786 (581) 395
- Cap-Saint-Ignace: (418) 246 715
- Cap-Santé: see Donnacona
- Caplan: (418) 388 (581) 363
- Carleton-sur-Mer: (418) 364 (581) 362
- Cascapédia–Saint-Jules: see New Richmond
- Causapscal: (418) 756 (581) 394
- Chambord: (418) 342 491 (581) 602 816
- Chandler: (418) 398 616 680 689 (581) 361
- Chapais: (418) 745
- Château-Richer: (418) 824 972 978
- Chibougamau: (418) 748 770 (581) 430 445 464 579 627
- Chute-aux-Outardes: see Pessamit
- Clermont: (418) 201 439 489 (581) 239
- Cloridorme: (418) 395 (581) 637
- Colombier: (418) 565 (581) 644
- Côte-Nord-du-Golfe-du-Saint-Laurent: (418) 242 787 795 (581) 293 295 301
- Courcelles-Saint-Évariste: (418) 483
- Dégelis: (418) 494 853
- Deschambault-Grondines: see Portneuf
- Desbiens: (418) 346 (581) 597 817
- Disraeli: (418) 449 (581) 209 714
- Dolbeau-Mistassini: (418) 239 276 706 979 (581) 212 596
- Donnacona: (418) 283 284 285 326 462 474 510 552 850 971 (581) 343 377 740 821 833
- Dosquet: see Laurier-Station
- East Broughton: (418) 351 427 (581) 331
- Escuminac: see Listuguj
- Esprit-Saint: see Lac-des-Aigles
- Essipit: see Les Escoumins
- Estcourt Station, Maine United States – see Pohénégamook
- Ferland-et-Boilleau: (418) 676 (581) 382
- Fermont: (418) 287 (581) 231 444
- Forestville: (418) 578 586 587 989 (581) 623
- Fossambault-sur-le-Lac: see Sainte-Catherine-de-la-Jacques-Cartier
- Frampton: (418) 479 (581) 227 426
- Franquelin: see Baie-Comeau
- Gaspé: (418) 269 355 360 361 368 819 892 (581) 348 360 635 636 822 832 887
- Gesgapegiag: see Maria
- Girardville: (418) 258 (581) 595 651
- Godbout: (418) 568
- Grand-Métis: see Mont-Joli
- Grande-Rivière: (418) 385 (581) 359
- Grande-Vallée: (418) 393 (581) 575 638 883
- Gros-Mécatina: (418) 773 (581) 289
- Grosse-Île: see Les Îles-de-la-Madeleine
- Grosses-Roches: see Sainte-Félicité
- Havre-Saint-Pierre: (418) 532 538 553 984 (581) 292
- Hébertville: (418) 343 344 (581) 593 594 717 718
- Hérouxville: see Saint-Tite
- Honfleur: see Saint-Anselme
- Hope: see Paspébiac
- Hope Town: see Paspébiac
- Inverness: (418) 453 470 (581) 272
- Irlande: see Saint-Ferdinand
- Kamouraska: see Saint-Pascal
- Kawawachikamach: (418) 585
- Kinnear's Mills: see Saint-Pierre-de-Broughton
- L'Ancienne-Lorette: see Québec City
- L'Ange-Gardien: see Boischatel
- L'Anse-Saint-Jean: (418) 272 608 (581) 390
- L'Ascension-de-Notre-Seigneur: see Alma
- L'Ascension-de-Patapédia: see Saint-François-d'Assise
- L'Île-d'Anticosti: (418) 535 (581) 286
- L'Isle-aux-Coudres: (418) 438 600 (581) 240
- L'Isle-Verte: (418) 898 (581) 648
- L'Islet: (418) 247 607
- La Doré: (418) 256 604 917 (581) 592
- La Durantaye: see Saint-Michel-de-Bellechasse
- La Guadeloupe: (418) 459 519 (581) 715
- La Malbaie: (418) 202 270 324 434 601 617 620 633 665 790 (581) 241 256 727
- La Martre: see Marsoui
- La Pocatière: (418) 371 856 (581) 213
- La Rédemption: see Mont-Joli
- La Romaine: (418) 229 (581) 291
- La Trinité-des-Monts: see Lac-des-Aigles
- Labrecque: see Alma
- Lac-au-Saumon: (418) 778 (581) 392
- Lac-aux-Sables: (418) 336 (581) 275
- Lac-Beauport: see Quebec City
- Lac-Bouchette: (418) 348 (581) 591 818
- Lac-Delage: see Stoneham-et-Tewkesbury
- Lac-des-Aigles: (418) 779 (581) 600
- Lac-Etchemin: (418) 625 (581) 215 820
- Lac-Frontière: (418) 245
- Lac-Jacques-Cartier: (418) 846 (581) 587
- Lac-John: see Kawawachikamach
- Lac-Poulin: see Saint-Georges
- Lac-Saint-Joseph: see Sainte-Catherine-de-la-Jacques-Cartier
- Lac-Sergent: see Sainte-Catherine-de-la-Jacques-Cartier
- Lamarche: see Alma
- Lambton: (418) 486
- Larouche: see Saguenay
- Laurier-Station: (418) 394 415 728 757
- Lejeune: see Saint-Michel-du-Squatec
- Les Bergeronnes: (418) 232 (581) 238 324
- Les Éboulements: (418) 635 975 (581) 242
- Les Escoumins: (418) 233 (581) 243 322
- Les Hauteurs: see Mont-Joli
- Les Îles-de-la-Madeleine: (418) 937 969 985 986
- Les Méchins: (418) 729 (581) 391
- Lévis: (418) 304 488 496 531 603 619 741 754 761 830 831 832 833 834 835 836 837 838 839 903 988 (581) 247 250 253 500 534 629 838 839 920
- Listuguj: (418) 788 (581) 352
- Longue-Pointe-de-Mingan: (418) 949 (581) 284
- Longue-Rive: (418) 231 (581) 255 320
- Lotbinière: see Saint-Édouard-de-Lotbinière
- Maliotenam: see Sept-Îles
- Maria: (418) 759 (581) 358
- Marsoui: (418) 288 (581) 393
- Mashteuiatsh: see Roberval
- Matane: (418) 429 556 560 562 566 (581) 232 261 334 379 631 834
- Matapédia: (418) 320 865 (581) 884
- Matimekosh: see Kawawachikamach
- Métabetchouan–Lac-à-la-Croix: (418) 349 (581) 590 716
- Métis-sur-Mer: (418) 936
- Mingan: see Longue-Pointe-de-Mingan
- Mistissini: (418) 923
- Mont-Carmel: (418) 300 498
- Mont-Joli: (418) 775 785
- Mont-Saint-Pierre: see Saint-Maxime-du-Mont-Louis
- Montmagny: (418) 206 234 241 248 250 252 291 447 508 513 941 (581) 262 552 632 725
- Murdochville: (418) 784 (581) 639
- Natashquan: see Nutashkuan
- Neuville: (418) 791 876 909
- New Carlisle: see Paspébiac
- New Richmond: (418) 372 391 392 (581) 346 355 886
- Newport: (418) 777 (581) 356
- Normandin: (418) 274 792 (581) 588 719
- Notre-Dame-Auxiliatrice-de-Buckland: see Saint-Damien-de-Buckland
- Notre-Dame-de-Lorette: see Dolbeau-Mistassini
- Notre-Dame-de-Montauban: see Lac-aux-Sables
- Notre-Dame-des-Anges: see Québec City
- Notre-Dame-des-Monts: see Clermont
- Notre-Dame-des-Neiges: see Trois-Pistoles
- Notre-Dame-des-Pins: see Beauceville
- Notre-Dame-des-Sept-Douleurs: see L'Isle-Verte
- Notre-Dame-du-Portage: see Rivière-du-Loup
- Notre-Dame-du-Rosaire: see Saint-Paul-de-Montminy
- Notre-Dame-du-Sacré-Cœur-d'Issoudun: see Laurier-Station
- Nouvelle: (418) 794 (581) 354
- Nutashkuan: (418) 726 (581) 288 622
- Packington: see Dégelis
- Padoue: see Mont-Joli
- Paspébiac: (418) 375 751 752 (581) 233 357
- Percé: (418) 370 408 645 782 783 (581) 353 365
- Péribonka: (418) 374 793 (581) 586
- Pessamit: (418) 567 (581) 643
- Petit-Saguenay: see L'Anse-Saint-Jean
- Petite-Rivière-Saint-François: (418) 632 (581) 244 640
- Petite-Vallée: see Grande-Vallée
- Pohénégamook: (418) 859 (581) 421
- Pointe-à-la-Croix: see Listuguj
- Pointe-aux-Outardes: see Pessamit
- Pointe-Lebel: see Baie-Comeau
- Pont-Rouge: (418) 399 410 813 873 (581) 329
- Port-Cartier: (418) 517 766 768 799 (581) 285 287 881
- Port-Daniel–Gascons: (418) 396 (581) 351
- Portneuf: (418) 286 913
- Portneuf-sur-Mer: (418) 238 (581) 260 323
- Price: see Mont-Joli
- Québec: (418) 204 208 210 254 255 260 261 262 263 264 265 266 271 316 317 353 380 407 425 431 440 446 454 455 456 463 468 473 476 478 520 521 522 523 524 525 527 528 529 554 558 559 561 563 564 569 570 571 572 573 574 575 576 577 580 609 614 621 622 623 624 626 627 628 634 640 641 643 644 646 647 648 649 650 651 652 653 654 655 656 657 658 659 660 661 663 664 666 667 670 681 682 683 684 686 687 688 691 692 694 704 708 717 747 767 780 781 800 801 802 803 805 806 808 809 821 840 841 842 843 845 847 849 861 864 871 872 874 877 890 905 906 907 914 915 922 925 928 929 930 931 932 933 934 948 951 952 953 955 956 977 990 997 998 999 (581) 201 251 300 305 307 308 309 313 316 317 318 319 349 366 400 401 450 531 578 580 628 681 700 701 702 703 704 705 741 742 745 777 781 814 836 888 922 925 927 928 980 981 982 983 984 985 986 989 990 991 994 995 996 997 998 999
- Ragueneau: see Pessamit
- Rimouski: (418) 318 416 509 712 721 722 723 724 725 727 730 731 732 734 735 736 740 749 750 896 (581) 246 314 456 525 624 720 824
- Ristigouche-Sud-Est: see Listuguj
- Rivière-à-Claude: see Saint-Maxime-du-Mont-Louis
- Rivière-à-Pierre: (418) 323
- Rivière-au-Tonnerre: (418) 465 (581) 304
- Rivière-aux-Outardes: (418) 584
- Rivière-Bleue: (418) 893 (581) 656
- Rivière-du-Loup: (418) 292 314 551 605 709 714 816 860 862 863 866 867 868 894 943 (581) 214 252 337 437 535 729
- Rivière-Éternité: see L'Anse-Saint-Jean
- Rivière-Ouelle: see La Pocatière
- Rivière-Saint-Jean: see Longue-Pointe-de-Mingan
- Roberval: (418) 275 765 900 996 (581) 217 442 585
- Sacré-Coeur: (418) 236 (581) 245 321
- Sacré-Coeur-de-Jésus: see East-Broughton
- Saguenay (418) 213 290 303 306 376 402 412 437 477 490 512 540 541 542 543 544 545 546 547 548 549 550 557 579 590 591 592 602 612 615 677 678 690 693 695 696 697 698 699 718 771 812 815 817 818 820 944 973 (581) 221 222 234 235 248 249 306 383 384 389 433 434 435 490 532 543 544 545 546 560 682 683 684 882
- Saint-Adalbert: see Saint-Pamphile
- Saint-Adelme: see Sainte-Félicité
- Saint-Adelphe: (418) 322 (581) 281
- Saint-Adrien-d'Irlande: see Thetford-Mines
- Saint-Agapit: (418) 401 888 918
- Saint-Aimé-des-Lacs: see Clermont
- Saint-Alban: see Saint-Marc-des-Carrières
- Saint-Alexandre-de-Kamouraska: (418) 495 970
- Saint-Alexandre-des-Lacs: see Lac-au-Saumon
- Saint-Alexis-de-Matapédia: see Saint-François-d'Assise
- Saint-Alfred: see Beauceville
- Saint-Alphonse: see Caplan
- Saint-Ambroise: (418) 352 526 672 (581) 385
- Saint-Anaclet-de-Lessard: see Rimouski
- Saint-André-de-Kamouraska: (418) 363 493
- Saint-André-de-Restigouche: see Matapédia
- Saint-André-du-Lac-Saint-Jean: see Métabetchouan-Lac-à-la-Croix
- Saint-Anselme: (418) 885 982
- Saint-Antoine-de-l'Isle-aux-Grues: see Montmagny
- Saint-Antoine-de-Tilly: (418) 413 886
- Saint-Antonin: see Rivière-du-Loup
- Saint-Apollinaire: (418) 433 881 981
- Saint-Arsène: see Rivière-du-Loup
- Saint-Athanase: see Rivière-du-Loup
- Saint-Aubert: see Saint-Jean-Port-Joli
- Saint-Augustin: (418) 947 (581) 302
- Saint-Augustin: see Péribonka
- Saint-Augustin-de-Desmaures: (418) 327 870 878 880 908
- Saint-Basile: (418) 329 500 (581) 930
- Saint-Benjamin: see Saint-Prosper
- Saint-Benoît-Labre: see Saint-Georges
- Saint-Bernard: (418) 475 (581) 223 427
- Saint-Bruno-de-Kamouraska: see Saint-Pascal
- Saint-Camille-de-Lellis: (418) 595
- Saint-Casimir: (418) 339 (581) 276
- Saint-Charles-de-Bellechasse: (418) 887 916
- Saint-Charles-de-Bourget: see Saint-Ambroise
- Saint-Charles-Garnier: see Mont-Joli
- Saint-Clément: see Saint-Jean-de-Dieu
- Saint-Cléophas: see Sayabec
- Saint-Côme–Linière: (418) 685 (581) 312
- Saint-Cyprien: see Saint-Jean-de-Dieu
- Saint-Cyprien: see Sainte-Justine
- Saint-Cyrille-de-Lessard: see L'Islet
- Saint-Damase: see Saint-Moïse
- Saint-Damase-de-L'Islet: see Saint-Jean-Port-Joli
- Saint-Damien-de-Buckland: (418) 467 789
- Saint-David-de-Falardeau: see Saint-Honoré
- Saint-Denis-De La Bouteillerie: see Mont-Carmel
- Saint-Donat: see Mont-Joli
- Saint-Edmond-les-Plaines: see Normandin
- Saint-Édouard-de-Lotbinière: (418) 703 796
- Saint-Éloi: see L'Isle-Verte
- Saint-Elzéar-de-Témiscouata: see Témiscouata-sur-le-Lac
- Saint-Elzéar: see Sainte-Marie
- Saint-Elzéar: see Bonaventure
- Saint-Éphrem-de-Beauce: (418) 484
- Saint-Épiphane: see Rivière-du-Loup
- Saint-Eugène-d'Argentenay: see Dolbeau-Mistassini
- Saint-Eugène-de-Ladrière: see Saint-Fabien
- Saint-Eusèbe: see Témiscouata-sur-le-Lac
- Saint-Fabien: (418) 869
- Saint-Fabien-de-Panet: (418) 249
- Saint-Félicien: (418) 218 307 515 518 613 618 630 637 671 679 879 (581) 218 438 583 721
- Saint-Félix-d'Otis: see Saguenay
- Saint-Ferdinand: (418) 428 (581) 208 270 712
- Saint-Ferréol-les-Neiges: (418) 405 826 992
- Saint-Flavien: see Laurier-Station
- Saint-François-d'Assise: (418) 299
- Saint-François-de-l'Île-d'Orléans: see Saint-Jean-de-l'Île-d'Orléans
- Saint-François-de-la-Rivière-du-Sud: (418) 259 472
- Saint-François-de-Sales: see Lac-Bouchette
- Saint-François-Xavier-de-Viger: see Saint-Hubert-de-Rivière-du-Loup
- Saint-Frédéric: see Tring-Jonction
- Saint-Fulgence: (418) 309 502 674 (581) 386
- Saint-Gabriel-de-Rimouski: (418) 798
- Saint-Gabriel-de-Valcartier: see Shannon
- Saint-Gabriel-Lalemant: see Saint-Pacôme
- Saint-Gédéon: (418) 345 (581) 582 815
- Saint-Gédéon-de-Beauce: (418) 582
- Saint-Georges: (418) 215 220 221 222 225 226 227 228 230 278 313 957 974 (581) 220 372 378 649 722 825 831
- Saint-Germain-de-Kamouraska: see Saint-Pascal
- Saint-Gervais: see Saint-Charles-de-Bellechasse
- Saint-Gilbert: see Saint-Marc-des-Carrières
- Saint-Gilles: see Saint-Agapit
- Saint-Godefroi: see Paspébiac
- Saint-Henri: (418) 700 858 882 891 895 924 (581) 350 551 633
- Saint-Henri-de-Taillon: see Alma
- Saint-Hilaire-de-Dorset: see La Guadeloupe
- Saint-Hilarion: (418) 400 457 (581) 257
- Saint-Honoré: (418) 312 503 673 (581) 388
- Saint-Honoré-de-Shenley: (418) 485 (581) 713
- Saint-Honoré-de-Témiscouata: see Saint-Hubert-de-Rivière-du-Loup
- Saint-Hubert-de-Rivière-du-Loup: (418) 497 910 (581) 650
- Saint-Irénée: (418) 452 (581) 258 326
- Saint-Isidore: (418) 882
- Saint-Jacques-de-Leeds: see Saint-Pierre-de-Broughton
- Saint-Jacques-le-Majeur-de-Wolfestown: see Disraeli
- Saint-Janvier-de-Joly: see Laurier-Station
- Saint-Jean-de-Brébeuf: see Inverness
- Saint-Jean-de-Cherbourg: see Sainte-Félicité
- Saint-Jean-de-Dieu: (418) 963 (581) 646
- Saint-Jean-de-l'Île-d'Orléans: (418) 203 829 994
- Saint-Jean-de-la-Lande: see Dégelis
- Saint-Joachim: see Beaupré
- Saint-Jean-Port-Joli: (418) 358 598
- Saint-Joseph-de-Beauce: (418) 397 993 (581) 226 374 428
- Saint-Joseph-de-Coleraine: see Thetford-Mines
- Saint-Joseph-de-Kamouraska: see Saint-André-de-Kamouraska
- Saint-Joseph-de-Lepage: see Mont-Joli
- Saint-Joseph-des-Érables: see Saint-Joseph-de-Beauce
- Saint-Jules: see Saint-Joseph-de-Beauce
- Saint-Julien: see Thetford-Mines
- Saint-Just-de-Bretenières: (418) 244
- Saint-Juste-du-Lac: see Témiscouata-sur-le-Lac
- Saint-Lambert-de-Lauzon: (418) 205 417 889
- Saint-Laurent-de-l'Île-d'Orléans: see Saint-Pierre-de-l'Île-d'Orléans
- Saint-Lazare-de-Bellechasse: see Sainte-Claire
- Saint-Léandre: see Saint-Ulric
- Saint-Léon-de-Standon: see Saint-Malachie
- Saint-Léon-le-Grand: (418) 743 (581) 342
- Saint-Léonard-de-Portneuf: see Saint-Raymond
- Saint-Louis-de-Gonzague: see Sainte-Rose-de-Watford
- Saint-Louis-de-Gonzague-du-Cap-Tourmente: see Beaupré
- Saint-Louis-du-Ha! Ha!: see Témiscouata-sur-le-Lac
- Saint-Luc-de-Bellechasse: (418) 636
- Saint-Ludger-de-Milot: (418) 302 373 (581) 589
- Saint-Magloire: (418) 257
- Saint-Malachie: (418) 642
- Saint-Marc-des-Carrières: (418) 268 403 (581) 277 325
- Saint-Marc-du-Lac-Long: see Rivière-Bleue
- Saint-Marcel: see Saint-Pamphile
- Saint-Marcellin: see Saint-Gabriel-de-Rimouski
- Saint-Martin: (418) 382
- Saint-Mathieu-de-Rioux: (418) 738 (581) 457
- Saint-Maxime-du-Mont-Louis: (418) 797 (581) 347
- Saint-Médard: see Saint-Jean-de-Dieu
- Saint-Michel-de-Bellechasse: (418) 804 884
- Saint-Michel-du-Squatec: (418) 855 (581) 647
- Saint-Modeste: see Rivière-du-Loup
- Saint-Moïse: (418) 776
- Saint-Narcisse: (418) 328 (581) 278
- Saint-Narcisse-de-Beaurivage: see Saint-Bernard
- Saint-Narcisse-de-Rimouski: see Rimouski
- Saint-Nazaire: see Alma
- Saint-Nazaire-de-Dorchester: see Saint-Malachie
- Saint-Nérée-de-Bellechasse: see Saint-Raphaël
- Saint-Noël: see Saint-Moïse
- Saint-Octave-de-Métis: see Mont-Joli
- Saint-Odilon-de-Cranbourne: (418) 464
- Saint-Omer: see Saint-Pamphile
- Saint-Pacôme: (418) 315 852
- Saint-Pamphile: (418) 356 357 432 710
- Saint-Pascal: (418) 308 492
- Saint-Patrice-de-Beaurivage: (418) 596 (581) 229 429
- Saint-Paul-de-la-Croix: see L'Isle-Verte
- Saint-Paul-de-Montminy: (418) 469 (581) 332
- Saint-Philémon: see Saint-Paul-de-Montminy
- Saint-Philibert: see Saint-Georges
- Saint-Philippe-de-Néri: see Mont-Carmel
- Saint-Pierre-Baptiste: see Inverness
- Saint-Pierre-de-Broughton: (418) 424 (581) 271
- Saint-Pierre-de-l'Île-d'Orléans: (418) 828 991 995
- Saint-Pierre-de-la-Rivière-du-Sud: see Montmagny
- Saint-Pierre-de-Lamy: see Saint-Hubert-de-Rivière-du-Loup
- Saint-Prime: (418) 251 451 902 (581) 584
- Saint-Prosper: (418) 594 (581) 315
- Saint-Raphaël: (418) 243 705
- Saint-Raymond: (418) 216 337 340 987
- Saint-René: see Saint-Martin
- Saint-René-de-Matane: (418) 224 (581) 341
- Saint-Robert-Bellarmin: see Saint-Gédéon-de-Beauce
- Saint-Roch-des-Aulnaies: (418) 354 919 (581) 885
- Saint-Romain: see Lambton
- Saint-Séverin: see Tring-Jonction
- Saint-Séverin: see Saint-Tite
- Saint-Siméon: (418) 471 638 (581) 264
- Saint-Siméon: see Bonaventure
- Saint-Simon-de-Rimouski: see Saint-Mathieu-de-Rioux
- Saint-Simon-les-Mines: see Beauceville
- Saint-Stanislas: see Saint-Narcisse
- Saint-Stanislas: see Dolbeau-Mistassini
- Saint-Sylvestre: see Saint-Patrice-de-Beaurivage
- Saint-Tharcisius: see Amqui
- Saint-Théophile: (418) 597
- Saint-Thomas-Didyme: see Normandin
- Saint-Thuribe: see Saint-Casimir
- Saint-Tite: (418) 365 366 419 507 716 954 (581) 279
- Saint-Tite-des-Caps: (418) 823 901
- Saint-Ubalde: (418) 277 (581) 280
- Saint-Ulric: (418) 737 (581) 340
- Saint-Urbain: (418) 639 (581) 259 641
- Saint-Valérien: see Rimouski
- Saint-Vallier: see Saint-Michel-de-Bellechasse
- Saint-Vianney: see Amqui
- Saint-Victor: (418) 588
- Saint-Zacharie: (418) 593
- Saint-Zénon-du-Lac-Humqui: see Saint-Léon-le-Grand
- Sainte-Agathe-de-Lotbinière: (418) 599 (581) 422
- Sainte-Angèle-de-Mérici: see Mont-Joli
- Sainte-Anne-de-Beaupré: see Beaupré
- Sainte-Anne-de-la-Pérade: (418) 325 707 (581) 282
- Sainte-Anne-des-Monts: (418) 763 764 904 967 (581) 338
- Sainte-Apolline-de-Patton: see Saint-Paul-de-Montminy
- Sainte-Aurélie: see Saint-Zacharie
- Sainte-Brigitte-de-Laval: (418) 606 825
- Sainte-Catherine-de-la-Jacques-Cartier: (418) 441 875
- Sainte-Christine-d'Auvergne: see Saint-Basile
- Sainte-Claire: (418) 807 883 897 966 983
- Sainte-Clotilde-de-Beauce: see East-Broughton
- Sainte-Croix: (418) 701 926
- Sainte-Élisabeth-de-Proulx: (418) 377 (581) 599
- Sainte-Euphémie-sur-Rivière-du-Sud: see Saint-Paul-de-Montminy
- Sainte-Famille-de-l'Île-d'Orléans: see Saint-Jean-de-l'Île-d'Orléans
- Sainte-Félicité: (418) 733 (581) 344
- Sainte-Flavie: see Mont-Joli
- Sainte-Florence: see Causapscal
- Sainte-Françoise: see Trois-Pistoles
- Sainte-Geneviève-de-Batiscan: (418) 362 (581) 274
- Sainte-Hélène-de-Kamouraska: see Saint-Pascal
- Sainte-Hénédine: (418) 504 935 (581) 423
- Sainte-Hedwidge: see Roberval
- Sainte-Irène: see Amqui
- Sainte-Jeanne-d'Arc: see Dolbeau-Mistassini
- Sainte-Jeanne-d'Arc-de-la-Mitis: see Mont-Joli
- Sainte-Justine: (418) 383
- Sainte-Louise: see Saint-Roch-des-Aulnaies
- Sainte-Luce: (418) 739
- Sainte-Lucie-de-Beauregard: (418) 223
- Sainte-Madeleine-de-la-Rivière-Madeleine: see Grande-Vallée
- Sainte-Marguerite: see Sainte-Hénédine
- Sainte-Marguerite-Marie: see Causapscal
- Sainte-Marie: (418) 207 209 369 381 386 387 389 390 420 421 448 506 945 (581) 224 375 424 550
- Sainte-Monique: see Alma
- Sainte-Paule: see Saint-Ulric
- Sainte-Perpétue: (418) 359
- Sainte-Pétronille: see Saint-Pierre-de-l'Île-d'Orléans
- Sainte-Praxède: see Disraeli
- Sainte-Rita: see Saint-Jean-de-Dieu
- Sainte-Rose-de-Watford: (418) 267
- Sainte-Rose-du-Nord: (418) 675 (581) 387
- Sainte-Sabine: see Sainte-Justine
- Sainte-Thècle: (418) 289 (581) 283
- Sainte-Thérèse-de-Gaspé: see Grande-Rivière
- Saints-Anges: see Vallée-Jonction
- Sayabec: (418) 536 (581) 345
- Schefferville: see Kawawachikamach
- Scott: see Sainte-Marie
- Sept-Îles: (418) 350 409 444 583 927 960 961 962 964 965 968 (581) 290 294 303 339 380 826 830
- Shannon: (418) 404 844 (581) 376
- Shigawake: see Paspébiac
- Stoneham-et-Tewkesbury: (418) 384 848 912 (581) 837
- Stratford: (418) 443 (581) 269
- Tadoussac: (418) 214 235 514 980 (581) 263 327
- Témiscouata-sur-le-Lac: (418) 854 899 938 940
- Thetford Mines: (418) 281 305 331 332 333 334 335 338 341 423 430 755 814 946 (581) 254 266 268 333 399 440 679 680 724 840
- Tourville: see Sainte-Perpétue
- Tring-Jonction: (418) 426 505 (581) 267
- Trois-Pistoles: (418) 516 851 857 (581) 645
- Uashat: see Sept-Îles
- Val-Alain: (418) 414 744
- Val-Brillant: (418) 742 (581) 336
- Vallée-Jonction: (418) 253 (581) 225 425
- Wendake: see Quebec City
- shared-cost service: (418) 310
- Premium services: 1 (367/418/581) 976.

== See also ==
- List of North American Numbering Plan area codes

Quebec area codes: 367/418/581, 354/450/579, 263/438/514, 468/819/873
	North: 709, 468/819/873	
West: 468/819/873	367/418/581	East: 428/506, 709
	South: 207, 428/506	
Maine area codes: 207
New Brunswick area codes: 506/428
