= Notre-Dame-des-Pins =

- Parish municipality
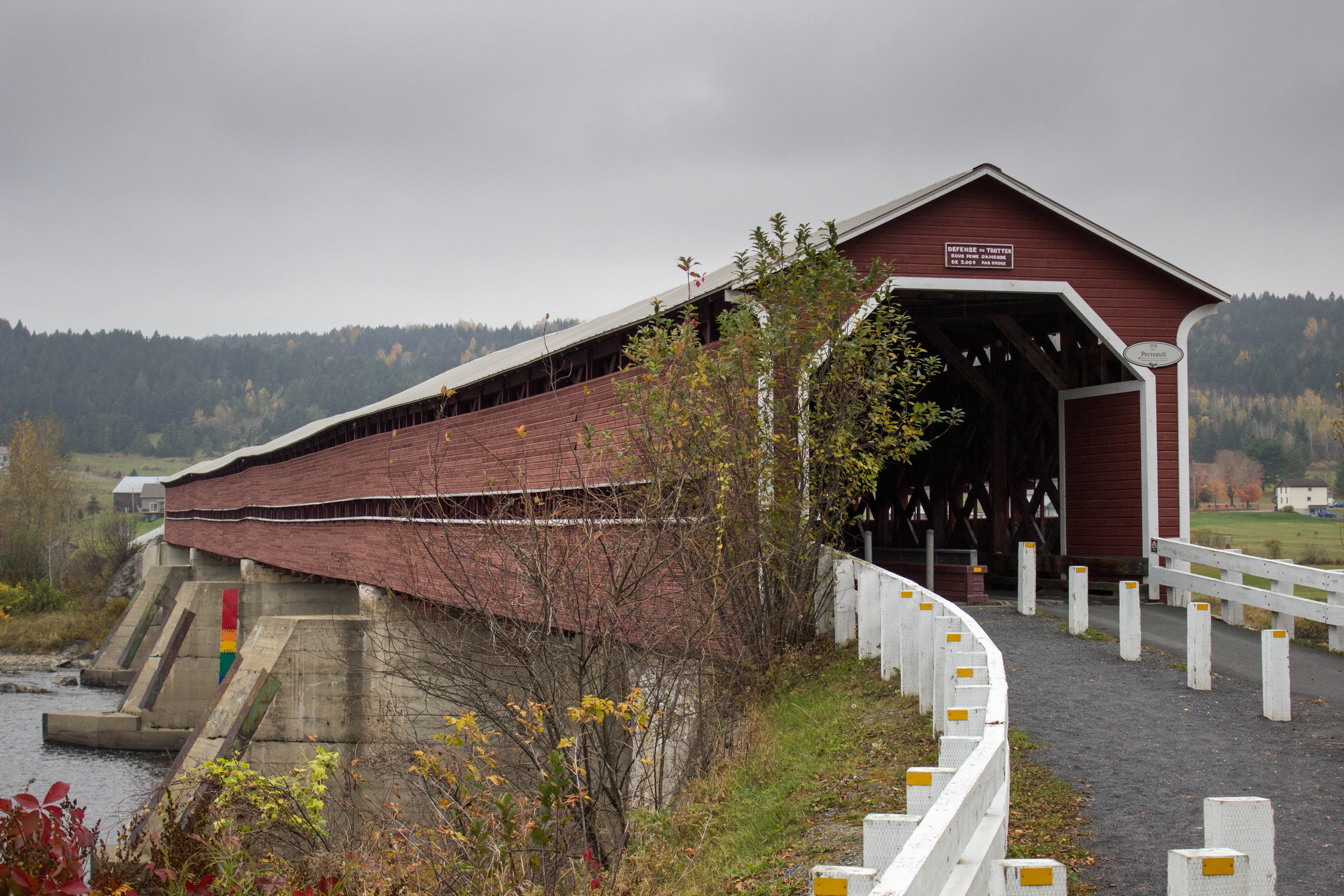

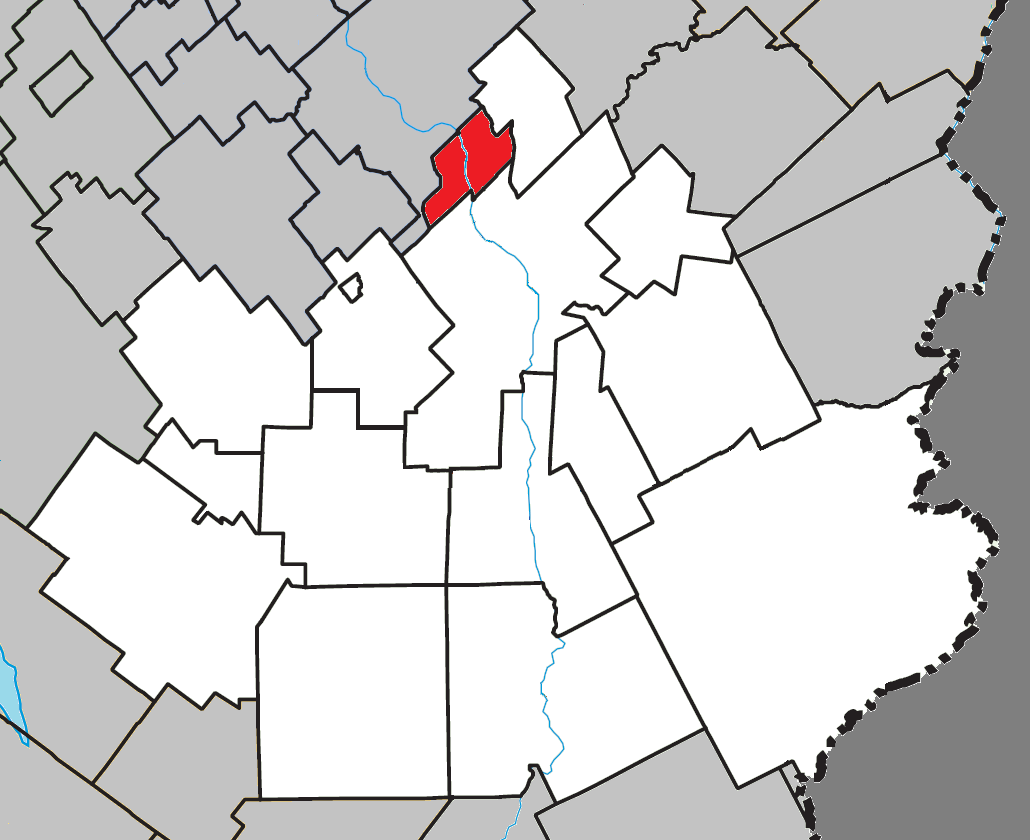
- Location within Beauce-Sartigan RCM.

- Location in southern Quebec.
- Coordinates: 46°11′N 70°43′W
- Country: Canada
- Province: Quebec
- Region: Chaudière-Appalaches
- RCM: Beauce-Sartigan
- Constituted: June 29, 1926

Government
  - Mayor: Alain Veilleux
  - Federal riding: Beauce
  - Prov. riding: Beauce-Sud

Area
  - Total: 25.00 km^{2} (9.65 sq mi)
  - Land: 24.09 km^{2} (9.30 sq mi)

Population (2021)
  - Total: 1,812
  - Density: 75.2/km^{2} (195/sq mi)
  - Pop 2016-2021: ▲13.7%
  - Dwellings: 763
- Time zone: UTC−5 (EST)
  - Summer (DST): UTC−4 (EDT)
- Postal code(s): G0M 1K0
- Area codes: 418 and 581
- Highways A-73: R-173
- Website: www.notredame despins.qc.ca

Notre-Dame-des-Pins (French pronunciation: [nɔtʁə dam de pɛ̃]) is a parish municipality in the Beauce-Sartigan Regional County Municipality in the Chaudière-Appalaches region of Quebec, Canada. Its population is 1,812 as of the Canada 2021 Census.

Notre-Dame-des-Pins is known for its covered bridge crossing the Chaudière River. Built in 1928 and opened in 1929, it is 146 m long. It is the longest of its kind in Quebec and the second longest in Canada.

When the municipality was founded, in 1926, the original name was Notre-Dame-de-la-Providence. Since the name never really established itself in local usage, it was changed to Notre-Dame-des-Pins in 1978.

== Demographics ==
In the 2021 Census of Population conducted by Statistics Canada, Notre-Dame-des-Pins had a population of 1,812 living in 745 of its 763 total private dwellings, a change of 13.7% from its 2016 population of 1,594. With a land area of 24.09 km^{2} (9.30 sq mi), it had a population density of 75.2/km^{2} (194.8/sq mi) in 2021.
