= Saint-Honoré-de-Shenley =

- Municipality
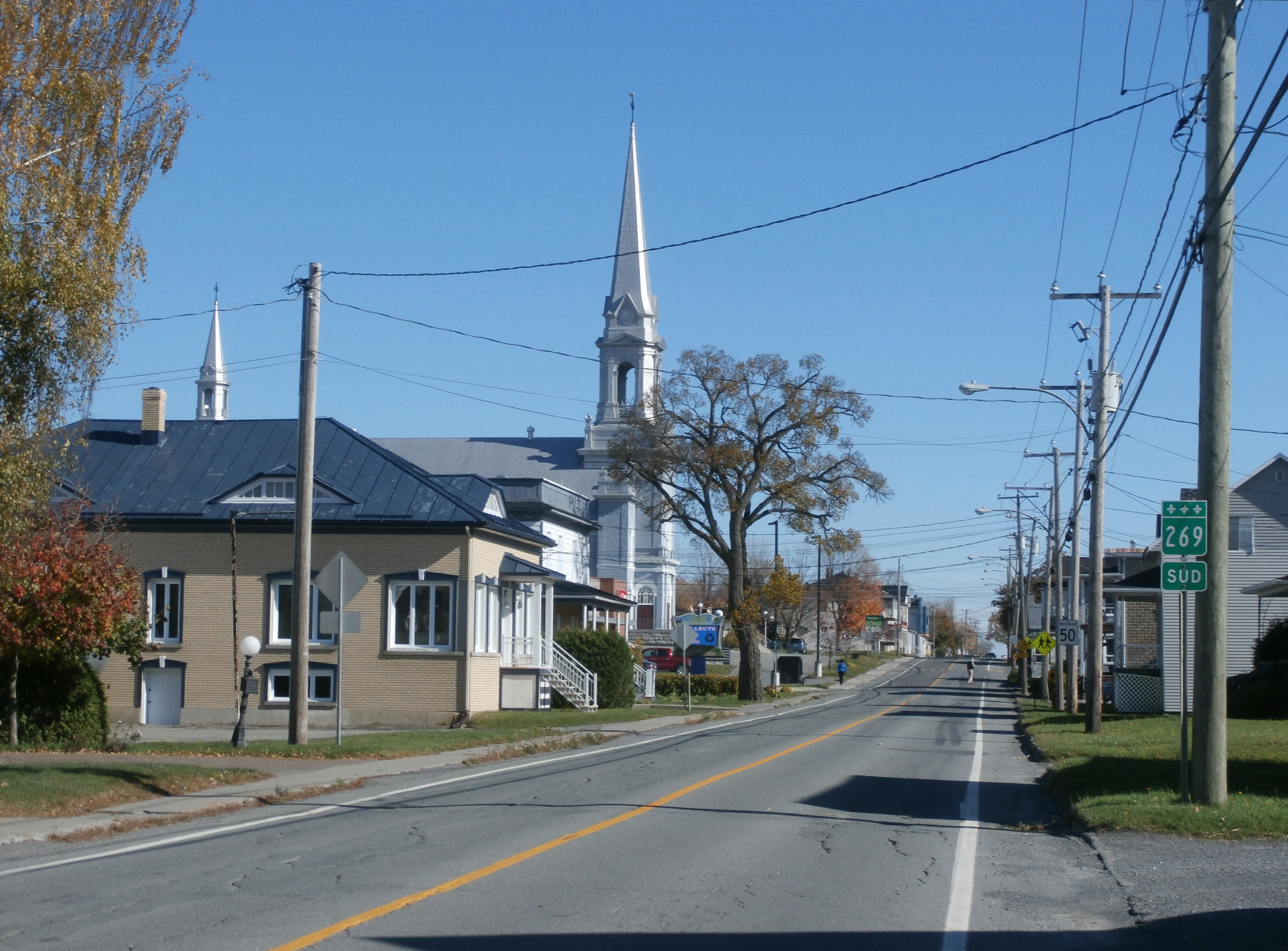
- Motto: Par la charrue et par l'épée ("By the plow and by the sword")
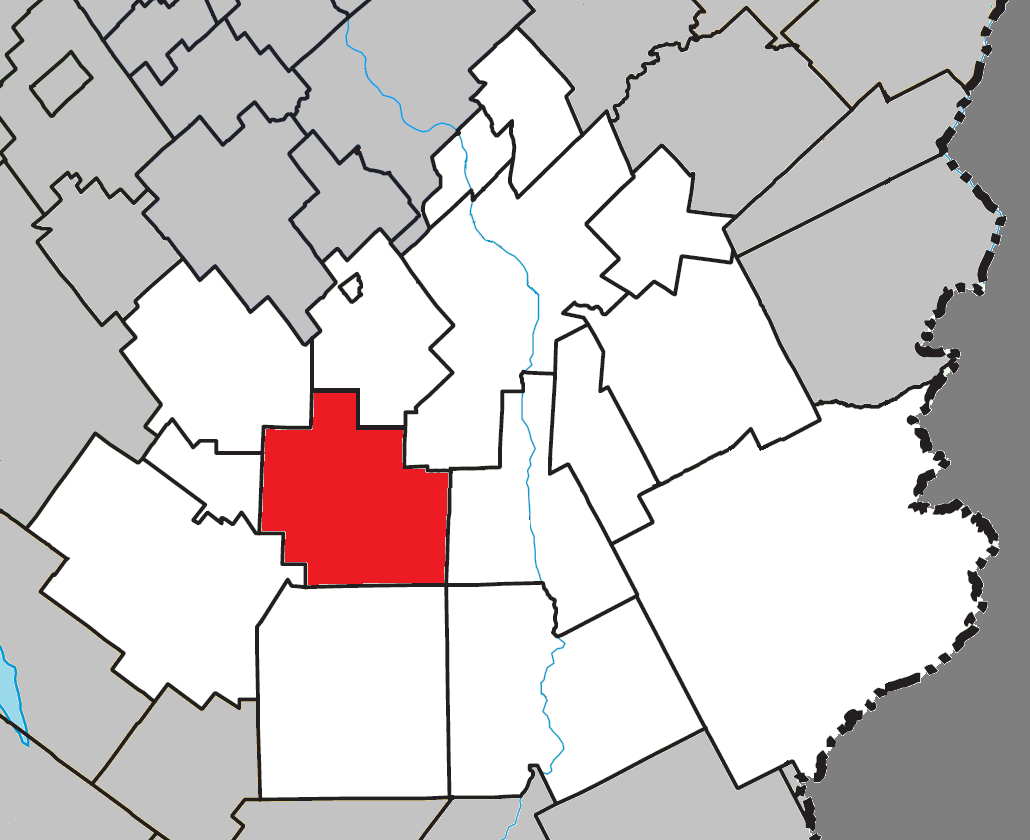
- Location within Beauce-Sartigan RCM

- Location in southern Quebec
- Coordinates: 45°58′N 70°50′W
- Country: Canada
- Province: Quebec
- Region: Chaudière-Appalaches
- RCM: Beauce-Sartigan
- Constituted: April 19, 2000

Government
  - Mayor: Dany Quirion
  - Federal riding: Beauce
  - Prov. riding: Beauce-Sud

Area
  - Total: 133.70 km^{2} (51.62 sq mi)
  - Land: 133.96 km^{2} (51.72 sq mi)
- There is an apparent discrepancy between 2 authoritative sources.

Population (2021)
  - Total: 1,555
  - Density: 11.6/km^{2} (30/sq mi)
  - Pop (2016-21): ▲2.5%
  - Dwellings: 678
- Time zone: UTC−5 (EST)
  - Summer (DST): UTC−4 (EDT)
- Postal code(s): G0M 1V0
- Area codes: 418 and 581
- Highways: R-269
- Website: www.sthonore deshenley.com

Saint-Honoré-de-Shenley is a municipality in the Beauce-Sartigan Regional County Municipality in the Chaudière-Appalaches region of Quebec, Canada. Its population is 1,555 as of 2021.

The municipality was created in 2000 after the merger of the parish municipality of Saint-Honoré and the township municipality of Shenley. It is named after Honoré Desruisseaux, the first reverend of the parish in 1869, and the village of Shenley, Hertfordshire in England.

== Demographics ==
=== Population ===
Canada census – Saint-Honoré-de-Shenley community profile

	2021	2016	2011
Population	1,555 (+2.5% from 2016)	1,483 (-7.9% from 2011)	1,610 (-2.1% from 2006)
Land area	133.96 km^{2} (51.72 sq mi)	134.00 km^{2} (51.74 sq mi)	133.10 km^{2} (51.39 sq mi)
Population density	11.6/km^{2} (30/sq mi)	11.1/km^{2} (29/sq mi)	12.1/km^{2} (31/sq mi)
Median age	41.2 (M: 41.2, F: 41.2)	40.7 (M: 40.2, F: 41.5)	39.9 (M: 39.4, F: 40.7)
Private dwellings	678 (total) 637 (occupied)	629 (total) 598 (occupied)	668 (total)
Median household income	$69,000	$56,917	$52,654

References: 2021 2016 2011

Historical Census Data - Saint-Honoré-de-Shenley, Quebec

Year	Pop.	±%
2001	1,664	—
2006	1,644	−1.2%

Year	Pop.	±%
2011	1,610	−2.1%
2016	1,517	−5.8%

Year	Pop.	±%
2021	1,555	+2.5%

Source: Statistics Canada

=== Language ===
French is by far the most widely spoken language, therefore, the municipality recognizes French as an official language for formal and informal use.

Canada Census Mother Tongue - Saint-Honoré-de-Shenley, Quebec
Census	Total	French			English			French & English			Other		
Year	Responses	Count	Trend	Pop %	Count	Trend	Pop %	Count	Trend	Pop %	Count	Trend	Pop %
2021	1,555	1,505	▲2.4%	96.8%	5	▼50.0%	0.3%	10	▲ n/a%	0.6%	35	▲600.0%	2.3%
2016	1,480	1,470	▼7.8%	99.3%	10	▲100.0%	0.7%	0	0.0%	0.0%	5	▲ n/a%	0.3%
2011	1,610	1,595	▼1.5%	99.1%	5	▼66.7%	0.3%	0	0.0%	0.0%	0	▼100.0%	0.0%
2006	1,640	1,620	▲0.6%	98.8%	15	▲ n/a%	0.9%	0	0.0%	0.0%	10	0.0%	0.6%
2001	1,615	1,610	n/a	99.7%	0	n/a	0.0%	0	n/a	0.0%	10	n/a	0.6%
