= Saint-Côme–Linière =

- Municipality
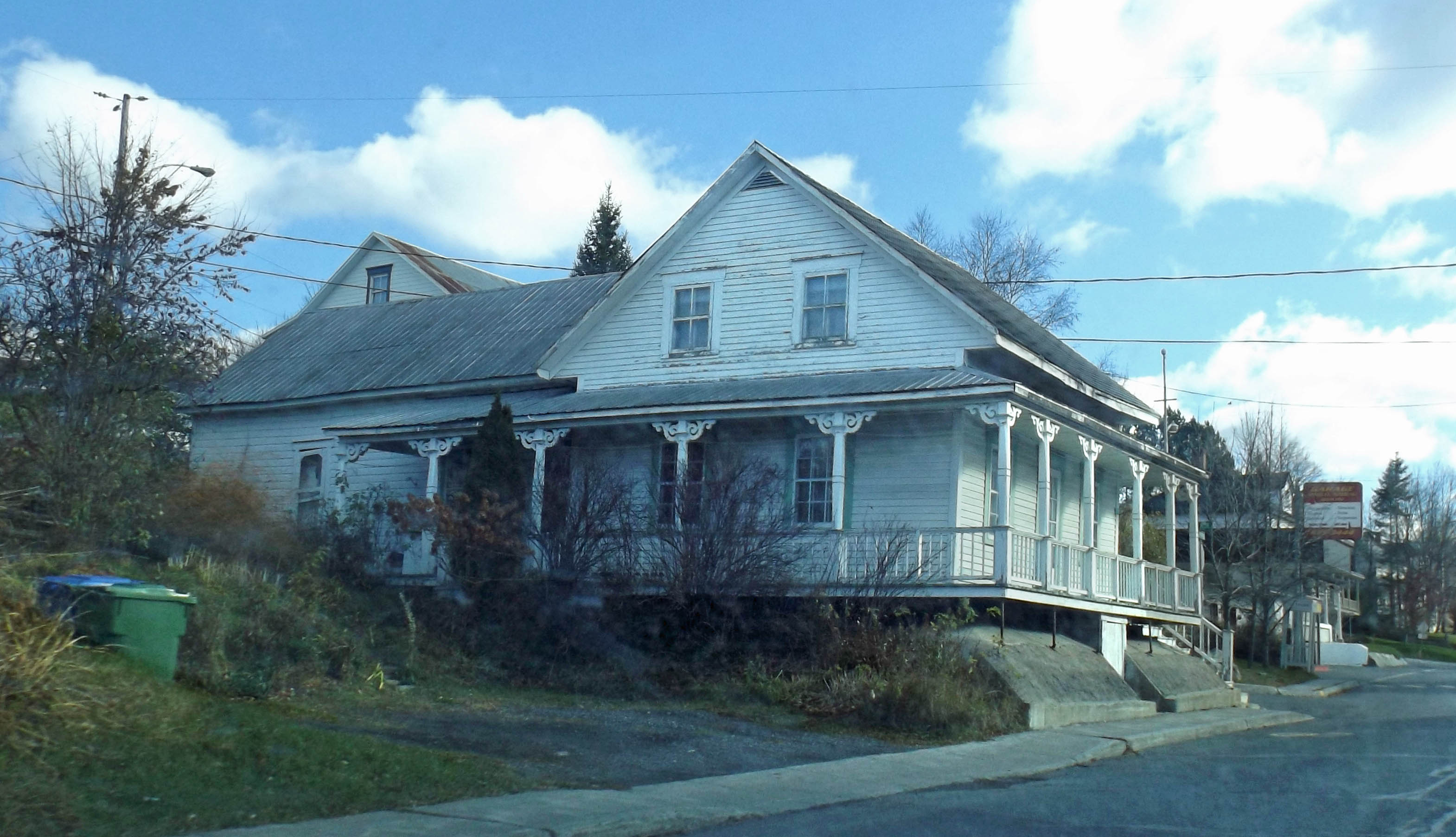
- House in Saint-Côme–Linière

- Coat of arms

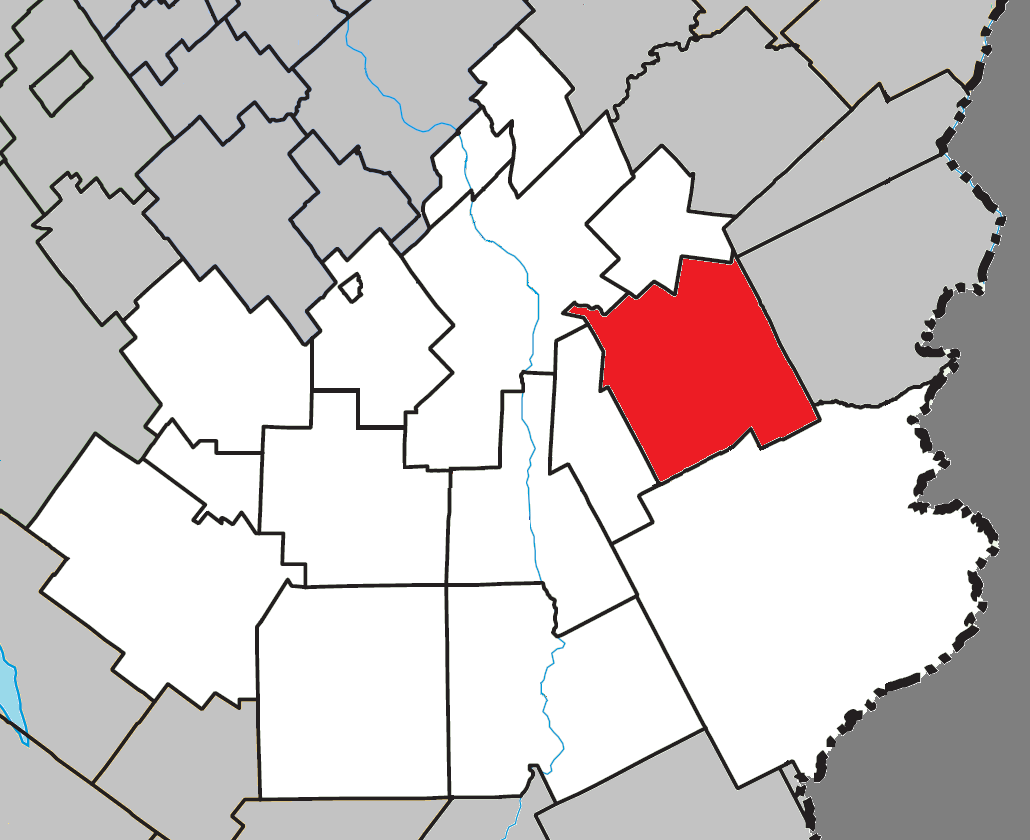
- Location within Beauce-Sartigan RCM.

- Location in southern Quebec.
- Coordinates: 46°04′N 70°31′W
- Country: Canada
- Province: Quebec
- Region: Chaudière-Appalaches
- RCM: Beauce-Sartigan
- Constituted: April 13, 1994

Government
  - Mayor: Gabriel Giguère
  - Federal riding: Beauce
  - Prov. riding: Beauce-Sud

Area
  - Municipality: 152.20 km^{2} (58.76 sq mi)
  - Land: 150.45 km^{2} (58.09 sq mi)
  - Urban: 1.61 km^{2} (0.62 sq mi)

Population (2021)
  - Municipality: 3,278
  - Density: 21.8/km^{2} (56/sq mi)
  - Urban: 1,400
  - Urban density: 872/km^{2} (2,260/sq mi)
  - Pop 2016-2021: ▲1.2%
  - Dwellings: 1,537
- Time zone: UTC−5 (EST)
  - Summer (DST): UTC−4 (EDT)
- Postal code(s): G0M 1J0
- Area codes: 418 and 581
- Highways: R-173; R-275
- Website: www.stcomeliniere.com

Saint-Côme–Linière (French pronunciation: [sɛ̃ kom linjɛʁ]) is a municipality in the Beauce-Sartigan Regional County Municipality in the Chaudière-Appalaches region of Quebec, Canada. The official spelling given by the Commission de toponymie uses an en dash after "Saint-Côme", but the town's own website uses a second hyphen: Saint-Côme–Linière. The population is 3,278 as of 2021.

Saint-Côme–Linière was constituted by the amalgamation of the parish municipality of Saint-Côme-de-Kennebec and the village of Linière on August 17, 1994. Saint-Côme was named after Arabian-born Christian martyr Saint Cosmas and Linière received its name from the seigneur who was first granted the land and cultivated fields of flax ("Lin" in French).

== Demographics ==
=== Population ===
Population trend:

Census	Population	Change (%)
2021	3,278	▲1.2%
2016	3,239	▼1.1%
2011	3,274	▲0.4%
2006	3,260	▲0.6%
2001	3,239	▼0.1%
1996	3,241	N/A%

== Government ==
Gabriel Giguère, mayor

== Notable people ==
- Roger Dumas, Playwright
