= List of historic places in Chaudière-Appalaches =

This article is a list of historic places in Chaudière-Appalaches, entered on the Canadian Register of Historic Places, whether they are federal, provincial, or municipal. All addresses are the administrative Region 17. For all other listings in the province of Quebec, see List of historic places in Quebec.

Name	Address	Coordinates	Government recognition (CRHP №)	Wikidata ID	Image
Chapelle de procession de la Sainte-Vierge	34, chemin du Domaine; Beaumont QC	46°49′49″N 71°00′30″W	Quebec (4926)		
Chapelle de procession Sainte-Anne	79, chemin du Domaine; Beaumont QC	46°49′50″N 71°00′54″W	Quebec (4926)		
Maison Molleur-Dit-Lallemand	193 Route du Fleuve; Beaumont QC	46°50′00″N 70°59′06″W	Quebec (11120), Beaumont municipality (8412)		
Site du Moulin-de-Beaumont	Rue du Moulin; Beaumont QC	46°51′15″N 70°57′03″W	Beaumont municipality (11456)		
Château Beauce	Beauce QC	46°26′13″N 71°01′15″W			
Site du patrimoine du Village-de-Beaumont	Chemin du Domaine; Beaumont QC	46°49′49″N 71°00′44″W	Beaumont municipality (16299)		
Site historique du Manoir-Dénéchaud	Rue de la Marina; Berthier-sur-Mer QC	46°56′03″N 70°44′05″W	Berthier-sur-Mer municipality (12375)		
Presbytère de Saint-Octave	157 Route Saint-Joseph; Dosquet QC	46°28′05″N 71°31′49″W	Dosquet municipality (14573)		
Maison et laiterie Guimont	291 chemin de la Riviere; Cap-Saint-Ignace QC	47°01′38″N 70°26′14″W	Quebec (5497)		Upload Photo
Manoir Gamache	120 rue du Manoir Ouest; Cap-Saint-Ignace QC	47°01′59″N 70°27′50″W	Quebec (4456)		
Moulin à vent de Vincelotte	641 chemin des Pionniers Est; Cap-Saint-Ignace QC	47°03′49″N 70°27′08″W	Quebec (4457)		
Noyau institutionnel de Cap-Saint-Ignace	Rue Jacob; Cap-Saint-Ignace QC	47°02′16″N 70°27′23″W	Cap-Saint-Ignace municipality (11140)		
Atelier Tardif	105 Avenue Sainte-Martine; Courcelles-Saint-Évariste QC	45°52′20″N 70°59′01″W	Courcelles-Saint-Évariste municipality (13157)		
Maison François-Goulet	270 8e Rang Sud; Courcelles-Saint-Évariste QC	45°51′58″N 70°56′45″W	Courcelles-Saint-Évariste municipality (9655)		
Maison Roland-Morin	107 Avenue Sainte-Martine; Courcelles-Saint-Évariste QC	45°52′21″N 70°59′01″W	Courcelles-Saint-Évariste municipality (9641)		
Moulin Bernier	100 Rue du Moulin; Courcelles-Saint-Évariste QC	45°52′19″N 70°59′05″W	Courcelles-Saint-Évariste municipality (9549)		
Résidence Odilon-Bilodeau	214 Rue Principale; Courcelles-Saint-Évariste QC	45°52′17″N 70°59′01″W	Courcelles-Saint-Évariste municipality (9544)		
Voie ferrée et pont de fer du Quebec Central	Next to Rue Principale across a stream Courcelles-Saint-Évariste QC	45°52′18″N 70°59′03″W	Courcelles-Saint-Évariste municipality (9122)		
Église Holy Trinity de Maple Grove	173 chemin Gosford; Irlande QC	46°05′03″N 71°31′52″W	Irlande municipality (4539)		
Building 14	Grosse Île; Saint-Antoine-de-l'Isle-aux-Grues QC	47°01′12″N 70°40′26″W	Federal (9839)		
Building 16	Grosse Île; Saint-Antoine-de-l'Isle-aux-Grues QC	47°01′09″N 70°40′27″W	Federal (10306)		
Building 18	Grosse Île; Saint-Antoine-de-l'Isle-aux-Grues QC	47°01′12″N 70°40′26″W	Federal (10371)		Upload Photo
Building 19	Grosse Île; Saint-Antoine-de-l'Isle-aux-Grues QC	47°01′11″N 70°40′25″W	Federal (10360)		Upload Photo
Building 29	Grosse Île; Saint-Antoine-de-l'Isle-aux-Grues QC	47°01′14″N 70°40′20″W	Federal (9835)		
Building 39	Grosse Île; Saint-Antoine-de-l'Isle-aux-Grues QC	47°01′37″N 70°40′03″W	Federal (10362)		
Building 42	Grosse Île; Saint-Antoine-de-l'Isle-aux-Grues QC	47°01′37″N 70°40′03″W	Federal (10301)		
Building 67	Grosse Île; Saint-Antoine-de-l'Isle-aux-Grues QC	47°01′25″N 70°40′18″W	Federal (10367)		
Building 100	Grosse Île; Saint-Antoine-de-l'Isle-aux-Grues QC	47°02′00″N 70°39′31″W	Federal (9736)		
Grosse Île and the Irish Memorial National Historic Site of Canada	Grosse Île; Saint-Antoine-de-l'Isle-aux-Grues QC	47°01′29″N 70°40′17″W	Federal (1189)		
Domaine seigneurial de l'Île-aux-Grues	rue Principale; Saint-Antoine-de-l'Isle-aux-Grues QC	47°04′37″N 70°31′11″W	Quebec (4244)		Upload Photo
Site historique des Églises-de-Kinnear's Mills	Rue des Eglises; Kinnear's Mills QC	46°13′12″N 71°22′48″W	Quebec (10527)		
Chapelle des Marins	Chemin des Pionniers Est; L'Islet QC	47°07′51″N 70°22′02″W	Quebec (12404)		
Église de Notre-Dame-de-Bon-Secours	Chemin des Pionniers Est; L'Islet QC	47°07′37″N 70°22′23″W	Quebec (11521)		
Salle des habitants de L'Islet-sur-Mer	18 Chemin des Pionniers Est; L'Islet QC	47°07′39″N 70°22′19″W	Quebec (4462)		
Église de Saint-Gabriel-de-La Durantaye	Rue du Piedmont; La Durantaye QC	46°50′03″N 70°51′23″W	Quebec (13261)		
Ancien hôtel de ville de Lauzon	302 Rue Saint-Joseph; Lévis QC	46°49′34″N 71°09′50″W	Quebec (4163)		
Armoury	10 de l'Arsenal Street; Lévis QC	46°48′14″N 71°11′01″W	Federal (11936)		
Casemates	Lévis Forts National Historic Site of Canada; Lévis QC	46°48′55″N 71°09′26″W	Federal (10465)		
Chapelle de procession de Saint-Nicolas	Rue des Pionniers; Lévis QC	46°42′08″N 71°24′05″W	Quebec (4938)		
Chapelle de procession Saint-François-Xavier	340 Rue Saint-Joseph; Lévis QC	46°49′36″N 71°09′42″W	Quebec (7079)		
Chapelle de procession Sainte-Anne	220 Rue Saint-Joseph; Lévis QC	46°49′27″N 71°10′05″W	Quebec (7078)		
Chapelle Notre-Dame-de-Grâce	Route Marie-Victorin; Lévis QC	46°42′00″N 71°25′10″W	Quebec (12443)		
Davie Shipyard National Historic Site of Canada	Saint-Laurent Street; Lévis QC	46°48′51″N 71°11′06″W	Federal (7772)		
Église de Saint-Romuald	Rue de l'Église (St-Romuald); Lévis QC	46°45′23″N 71°14′13″W	Quebec (8725)		
Église Notre-Dame-de-la-Victoire	Rue Notre-Dame; Lévis QC	46°48′37″N 71°10′56″W	Quebec (14822)		
L'Anglicane	33 Rue Wolfe; Lévis QC	46°48′31″N 71°11′04″W	Lévis municipality (4538)		
Lévis Forts National Historic Site of Canada	41 Government Road; Lévis QC	46°48′55″N 71°09′30″W	Federal (15802)		
Lévis Railway Station (Intercolonial) National Historic Site of Canada	5995 Saint-Laurent Street; Lévis QC	46°48′39″N 71°11′16″W	Federal (7636)		
Maison Alphonse-Desjardins	8 Rue Mont-Marie; Lévis QC	46°48′35″N 71°10′55″W	Quebec (5498)		
Maison natale Louis-Fréchette	4385 Rue Saint-Laurent; Lévis QC	46°47′03″N 71°11′46″W	Quebec (4311)		
Maison Pâquet	1630 Route Marie-Victorin; Lévis QC	46°40′12″N 71°25′08″W	Quebec (5635)		
Monastère des Soeurs Adoratrices du Précieux-Sang	69 Rue Saint-Louis; Lévis QC	46°48′12″N 71°11′07″W	Lévis municipality (4731)		
Site du patrimoine de l'Église-et-du-Presbytère-de-Saint-Jean-Chrysostome	69 Rue Saint-Louis; Lévis QC	46°43′07″N 71°11′50″W	Lévis municipality (4733)		
Site du patrimoine de Saint-Nicolas	69 Rue Saint-Louis; Lévis QC	46°42′07″N 71°24′08″W	Lévis municipality (4819)		
Joffre Roundhouse (Canadian National) National Historic Site of Canada	2250 de la Rotonde Avenue; Charny QC	46°42′25″N 71°16′20″W	Federal (12541)		Upload Photo
Chapelle de procession de Saint-Louis	Route Marie-Victorin; Lotbiniere QC	46°36′59″N 71°56′05″W	Quebec (8605)		
Domaine Joly-De Lotbinière	Route de Pointe-Platon; Lotbiniere QC	46°39′57″N 71°51′01″W	Federal (10476), Quebec (8111), Lotbiniere municipality (8119)		
Église de Saint-Louis	Route Marie-Victorin; Lotbiniere QC	46°37′00″N 71°56′04″W	Quebec (12380)		
Maison Ambroise-Chavigny-De La Chevrotière	7640 Rue Marie-Victorin; Lotbiniere QC	46°36′42″N 71°57′05″W	Quebec (6607)		
Maison François-Bélangé	7661 Rue Marie-Victorin; Lotbiniere QC	46°36′33″N 71°57′20″W	Quebec (5027)		
Maison Pagé	7482 Rue Marie-Victorin; Lotbiniere QC	46°36′59″N 71°56′00″W	Quebec (5028)		
Moulin du Domaine-de-Lotbinière	7218 Rue Marie-Victorin; Lotbiniere QC	46°38′42″N 71°53′32″W	Quebec (6865)		
Moulin du Portage	1080 Rang Saint-Francois; Lotbiniere QC	46°33′18″N 71°58′09″W	Quebec (5283)		
Pont Perreault	Across the Chaudiere River at 30e Rue; Notre-Dame-des-Pins QC	46°10′57″N 70°43′00″W	Quebec (9034)		
Pilier de Pierre Lighthouse	Les Piliers, off the shore of Saint-Jean-Port-Joli; Saint-Jean-Port-Joli QC	47°12′21″N 70°21′35″W	Federal (10472, (20716)		
Calvaire	Route Marie-Victorin; Saint-Antoine-de-Tilly QC	46°40′57″N 71°29′57″W	Saint-Antoine-de-Tilly municipality (8482)		Upload Photo
Église de Saint-Antoine-de-Tilly	Chemin de Tilly; Saint-Antoine-de-Tilly QC	46°39′51″N 71°34′26″W	Quebec (14682)		
Presbytère de Saint-Antoine-de-Tilly	3868 Chemin de Tilly; Saint-Antoine-de-Tilly QC	46°39′51″N 71°34′22″W	Saint-Antoine-de-Tilly municipality (8218)		
Église de Saint-Bernard	Rue Saint-Georges; Saint-Bernard QC	46°29′52″N 71°08′16″W	Quebec (14786)		
Presbytère de Saint-Bernard	1474 Rue Saint-Georges; Saint-Bernard QC	46°29′52″N 71°08′17″W	Quebec (4459)		
École-chapelle de Bras-d'Apic	Route 285; Saint-Cyrille-de-Lessard QC	46°57′13″N 70°10′57″W	Quebec (4243)		
Église de Saint-Elzéar	Avenue Principale; Saint-Elzéar QC	46°24′24″N 71°03′36″W	Quebec (10454)		
Ancien presbytère de Saint-Évariste-de-Forsyth	325 Rue Principale; Courcelles-Saint-Évariste QC	45°56′23″N 70°56′30″W	Quebec (10415)		
Ancien presbytère de Saint-François-de-Sales	3835 Chemin Royal; Saint-François-de-la-Rivière-du-Sud QC	46°53′14″N 70°42′52″W	Quebec (5153)		
Site historique de Saint-François-de-la-Rivière-du-Sud	Chemin Royal; Saint-François-de-la-Rivière-du-Sud QC	46°53′15″N 70°42′50″W	Quebec (5290)		
Building 22	Grosse Île; Montmagny QC	47°01′11″N 70°40′24″W	Federal (10509)		Upload Photo
Building 34	Grosse Île; Montmagny QC	47°01′17″N 70°40′28″W	Federal (10451)		
Building 35	Grosse Île; Montmagny QC	47°01′18″N 70°40′27″W	Federal (10468)		Upload Photo
Building 38	Grosse Île; Montmagny QC	47°01′18″N 70°40′26″W	Federal (10453)		
Building 43	Grosse Île; Montmagny QC	47°01′15″N 70°40′29″W	Federal (10464)		Upload Photo
Building 48	Grosse Île; Montmagny QC	47°01′37″N 70°40′03″W	Federal (10466)		
Building 49	Grosse Île; Montmagny QC	47°01′38″N 70°40′02″W	Federal (10520)		
Building 66	Grosse Île; Montmagny QC	47°01′38″N 70°39′56″W	Federal (10519)		Upload Photo
Building 71	Grosse Île; Montmagny QC	47°01′42″N 70°39′55″W	Federal (10452)		
Building 77	Grosse Île; Montmagny QC	47°01′50″N 70°39′46″W	Federal (10461)		
Building 84	Grosse Île; Montmagny QC	47°01′50″N 70°39′47″W	Federal (10511)		
Armoury	194 Avenue de la Gare; Montmagny QC	46°58′34″N 70°33′31″W	Federal (11069)		Upload Photo
Étienne-Paschal Taché House National Historic Site of Canada	37-39 Sainte-Marie Avenue; Montmagny QC	46°58′52″N 70°33′32″W	Federal (7601), Quebec (5029)		
Maison et laiterie Casault	780 Boulevard Taché Ouest; Montmagny QC	46°57′09″N 70°39′50″W	Quebec (4249)		Upload Photo
Maison Têtu	313 Boulevard Taché Ouest; Montmagny QC	46°58′44″N 70°35′35″W	Montmagny municipality (13160)		Upload Photo
Manoir et four à pain Couillard	301 Boulevard Taché Est; Montmagny QC	46°59′06″N 70°32′51″W	Quebec (4461)		
VIA Rail Station Heritage Railway Station	4 Rue de la Station; Montmagny QC	46°58′25″N 70°33′35″W	Federal (7100)		
Secteur de l'église de Saint-Frédéric	Rue Principale; Saint-Frédéric QC	46°17′49″N 70°58′27″W	Saint-Frédéric municipality (11047)		
Socle de la Statue-Équestre-de-Saint-Georges	1890 1ère Avenue; Saint-Georges QC	46°07′04″N 70°40′21″W	Quebec (4467)		
Manoir William-Milburn-Pozer	610 Avenue de la Chaudière; Saint-Georges QC	46°07′20″N 70°41′10″W	Quebec (9527)		
Chapelle de procession de Saint-Gervais	Rue Principale at 1er Rang Est; Saint-Gervais QC	46°42′59″N 70°53′27″W	Quebec (7075)		
Presbytère de Saint-Henri	219 Rue Commerciale; Saint-Henri QC	46°41′33″N 71°04′04″W	Saint-Henri municipality (13338)		
Église Saint-Hilaire	Rue Principale at Route du 9e Rang; Saint-Hilaire-de-Dorset QC	45°51′53″N 70°51′26″W	Saint-Hilaire-de-Dorset municipality (15151)		
Église Saint-Isidore	Rue Sainte-Geneviève at Route du Vieux-Moulin; Saint-Isidore QC	46°35′01″N 71°05′24″W	Quebec (10261)		
Cimetière de Saint-Éphrem	Route 271 Nord at Rue du Collège; Saint-Éphrem-de-Beauce QC	46°03′42″N 70°57′02″W	Saint-Éphrem-de-Beauce municipality (8380)		
Église et sacristie de Saint-Éphrem	Route 108 Est; Saint-Éphrem-de-Beauce QC	46°03′34″N 70°57′15″W	Saint-Éphrem-de-Beauce municipality (13857)		
Maison Adrienne-Lemieux	42 Route 108 Est; Saint-Éphrem-de-Beauce QC	46°03′33″N 70°57′14″W	Saint-Éphrem-de-Beauce municipality (12447)		
Maison Deslauriers et laiterie	370 Route 271 Nord; Saint-Éphrem-de-Beauce QC	46°04′00″N 70°54′59″W	Saint-Éphrem-de-Beauce municipality (13276)		
Maison Roméo-Poulin	988 Route 108 Ouest; Saint-Éphrem-de-Beauce QC	46°00′08″N 70°57′40″W	Saint-Éphrem-de-Beauce municipality (13232)		
Maison Vital-Roy	840 Route 108 Ouest; Saint-Éphrem-de-Beauce QC	46°01′21″N 70°57′23″W	Saint-Éphrem-de-Beauce municipality (12444)		
Monument du Sacré-Coeur	Junction Routes 108 and 271; Saint-Éphrem-de-Beauce QC	46°03′32″N 70°57′15″W	Saint-Éphrem-de-Beauce municipality (11045)		
Pont Napoléon-Grondin	Rang Saint-Jean-Baptiste; Saint-Éphrem-de-Beauce QC	45°59′53″N 70°55′03″W	Saint-Éphrem-de-Beauce municipality (11046)		
Presbytère de Saint-Éphrem-de-Beauce	43 Route 108 Est; Saint-Éphrem-de-Beauce QC	46°03′37″N 70°57′14″W	Saint-Éphrem-de-Beauce municipality (13259)		
Sacristie de la première chapelle	Route 108 Est; Saint-Éphrem-de-Beauce QC	46°03′36″N 70°57′16″W	Saint-Éphrem-de-Beauce municipality (11334)		
Église de Saint-Jean-Port-Joli	Avenue De Gaspé Ouest; Saint-Jean-Port-Joli QC	47°12′56″N 70°16′11″W	Quebec (9062)		
Maison Lavallée	63 Avenue De Gaspé Est; Saint-Jean-Port-Joli QC	47°13′02″N 70°16′01″W	Quebec (11462)		Upload Photo
Site Philippe-Aubert-de-Gaspé	Avenue De Gaspé Ouest; Saint-Jean-Port-Joli QC	47°10′12″N 70°18′31″W	Saint-Jean-Port-Joli municipality (12451)		
Hôtel de ville de Saint-Joseph-de-Beauce	843 Avenue du Palais; Saint-Joseph-de-Beauce QC	46°18′27″N 70°52′48″W	Saint-Joseph-de-Beauce municipality (13212)		
Palais de justice de Saint-Joseph-de-Beauce	795 Avenue du Palais; Saint-Joseph-de-Beauce QC	46°18′31″N 70°52′52″W	Quebec (4466)		
Saint-Joseph-de-Beauce Institutional Ensemble National Historic Site of Canada	Saint-Joseph-des-Érables QC	46°18′37″N 70°52′45″W	Federal (12129), Quebec (4083)		
Bibliothèque municipale de Saint-Malachie	1184 Avenue Principale; Saint-Malachie QC	46°31′51″N 70°45′55″W	Saint-Malachie municipality (8296)		
Église de Saint-Martin	1e Avenue Est; Saint-Martin QC	45°57′36″N 70°39′23″W	Saint-Martin municipality (12108)		
Presbytère de Saint-Martin	129 1e Avenue Est; Saint-Martin QC	45°57′34″N 70°39′24″W	Saint-Martin municipality (9639)		
Église de Saint-Narcisse-de-Beaurivage	Rue Principale; Saint-Narcisse-de-Beaurivage QC	46°28′56″N 71°13′59″W	Saint-Narcisse-de-Beaurivage municipality (10530)		
Église de Saint-Pierre-du-Sud	Rue Principale; Saint-Pierre-de-la-Rivière-du-Sud QC	46°54′54″N 70°37′37″W	Quebec (13128)		Upload Photo
Édifice du Chef-lieu	19 Avenue Chanoine-Audet; Saint-Raphael QC	46°47′40″N 70°45′20″W	Saint-Raphael municipality (13185)		Upload Photo
Église de Saint-Raphaël	Rue Principale; Saint-Raphael QC	46°47′42″N 70°45′20″W	Saint-Raphael municipality (13186)		
Presbytère de Saint-Raphaël	86 Rue Principale; Saint-Raphael QC	46°47′43″N 70°45′18″W	Saint-Raphael municipality (13159)		Upload Photo
Chapelle de procession Notre-Dame-de-Lourdes	Route de la Seigneurie; Saint-Roch-des-Aulnaies QC	47°18′39″N 70°10′25″W	Quebec (4940)		
Domaine seigneurial des Aulnaies	525 Route de la Seigneurie; Saint-Roch-des-Aulnaies QC	47°18′56″N 70°08′38″W	Quebec (4241)		
Moulin banal des Aulnaies	525 Route de la Seigneurie; Saint-Roch-des-Aulnaies QC	47°18′56″N 70°08′38″W	Quebec (4451)		
Cimetière de Saint-Séverin	199 Rue de l'Église; Saint-Severin QC	46°19′30″N 71°03′12″W	Saint-Severin municipality (8532)		
Site de la chapelle Saint-Paul, du cimetière et du manoir Taylor	Saint-Simon-les-Mines QC	46°11′50″N 70°37′16″W	Saint-Simon-les-Mines municipality (13862)		
Cimetière anglican de Saint-Sylvestre	Off Route 269; Saint-Sylvestre QC	46°22′42″N 71°16′59″W	Quebec (5610)		Upload Photo
Maison Joseph-Côté	350 Rue Principale; Saint-Vallier QC	46°53′32″N 70°49′25″W	Quebec (5086)		
Site du patrimoine du Manoir-de-la-Seigneurie-de-Saint-Vallier	Chemin Lemieux; Saint-Vallier QC	46°54′32″N 70°47′22″W	Saint-Vallier municipality (10467)		
Maison du Docteur-Joseph-Arthur-Noé-Chabot	108 Rue Principale; Sainte-Claire QC	46°35′54″N 70°52′08″W	Sainte-Claire municipality (8192)		
Église de Sainte-Croix	6319 Rue Principale; Sainte-Croix QC	46°37′21″N 71°44′23″W	Sainte-Croix municipality (16297)		
Maison Boisvert	169 Rang Saint-Eustache; Sainte-Croix QC	46°37′20″N 71°47′25″W	Quebec (6603)		
Maison Louis-Dumont	401 Chemin Gosford; Sainte-Agathe-de-Lotbinière QC	46°23′03″N 71°24′34″W	Sainte-Agathe-de-Lotbinière municipality (9405)		
Pont Rouge	Chemin Gosford over the Palmer River; Sainte-Agathe-de-Lotbinière QC	46°19′50″N 71°24′54″W	Sainte-Agathe-de-Lotbinière municipality (8202)		
Church of Sainte-Marie National Historic Site of Canada	60 Notre-Dame Street South; Sainte-Marie QC	46°26′15″N 71°01′21″W	Federal (12128), Quebec (9341)		
Maison Dupuis	640 Rue Notre-Dame Sud; Sainte-Marie QC	46°25′53″N 71°00′50″W	Sainte-Marie municipality (12107)		
Maison J.-Arcade-Vachon	383 Avenue de la Coopérative; Sainte-Marie QC	46°26′24″N 71°01′15″W	Sainte-Marie municipality (10178)		
Maison Pierre-Lacroix	552 Rue Notre-Dame Nord; Sainte-Marie QC	46°26′34″N 71°01′51″W	Quebec (4313)		
Manoir Taschereau	730 Rue Notre-Dame Nord; Sainte-Marie QC	46°26′39″N 71°02′02″W	Quebec (4450)		
Canadian Pacific Railway Station	Rue Principale; Tring-Jonction QC	46°16′10″N 70°59′37″W	Federal (4519), Tring-Jonction municipality (6870)		
Canadian Pacific Railway Station	397 Rousseau Blvd. Vallée-Jonction QC	46°22′17″N 70°55′23″W	Federal (6634), Vallée-Jonction municipality (8835)		

== See also ==
- List of historic places in Quebec
- List of National Historic Sites of Canada in Quebec
