= Léandre Parent =

Canadian sculptor

- Born: 1809; Quebec City, Quebec
- Died: 1889 (aged 79–80); Quebec City, Quebec

Léandre Parent (1809 – 1889) was a Canadian sculptor.

From 1822 to 1826 he apprenticed in sculpture under Thomas Baillairgé. From 1830 to 1870, he operated a sculpture studio in Saint-Roch, Quebec City. His sculpture and carpentry work for churches includes the church of Saint-François in Ile d'Orléans, Quebec and the church of Saint-Louis in Lotbinière, Quebec.

His work is included in the collections of the Musée national des beaux-arts du Québec and the National Gallery of Canada

He died June 12, 1889, in Quebec City.
