= Rivière-du-Moulin Ecological Reserve =

Protected area in Quebec, Canada

- Réserve écologique de la Rivière-du-Moulin
- IUCN category Ia (strict nature reserve)
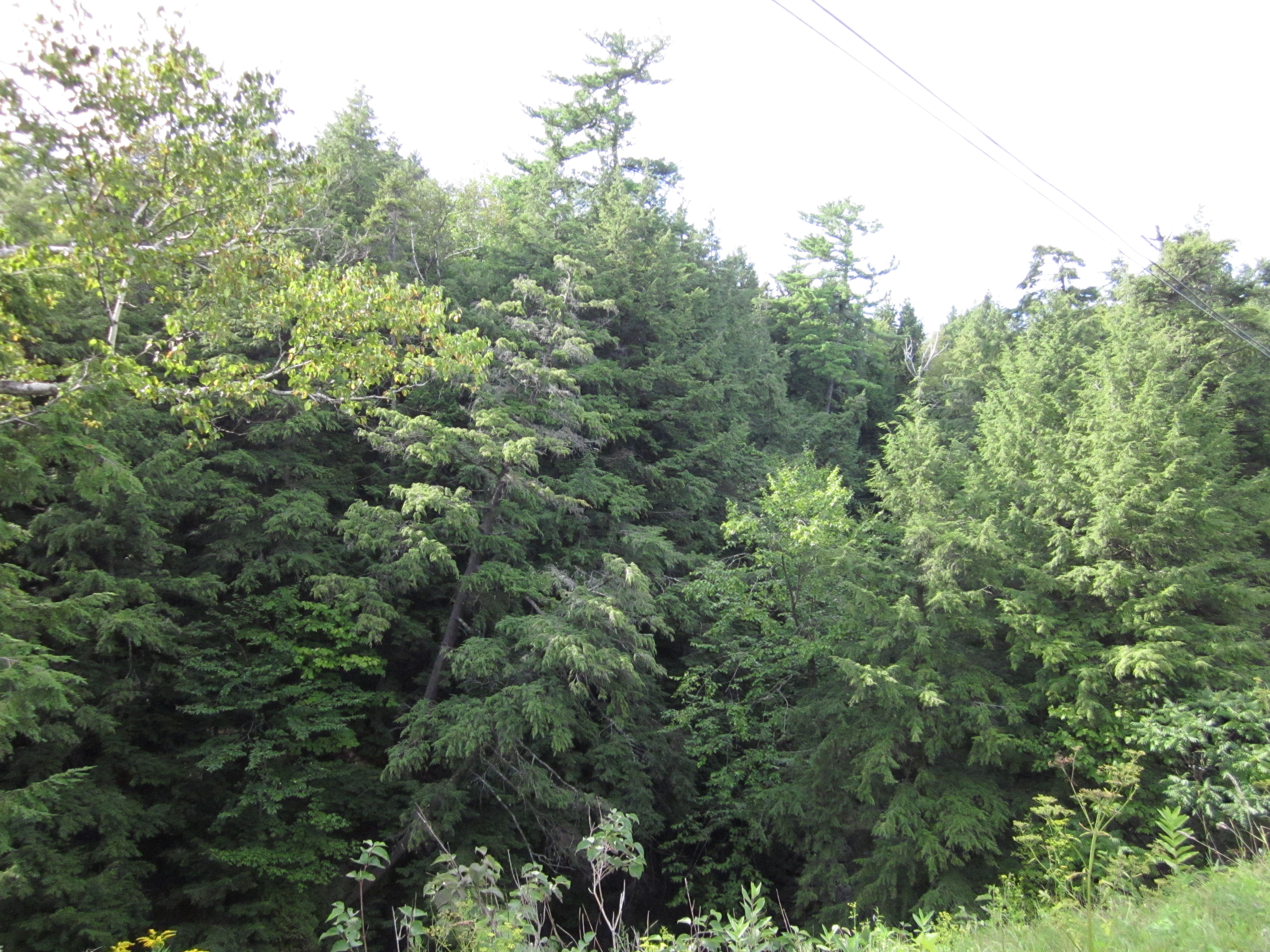
- Réserve écologique de Rivière-du-Moulin seen from route 132 in Lotbinière

- Location within Quebec
- Location: Lotbinière, Chaudière-Appalaches, Quebec, Canada
- Coordinates: 46.6420°N 71.8947°W
- Area: 10.66 ha (26.3 acres)
- Designation: Ecological reserve
- Established: 8 October 1975
- Governing body: Ministry of Sustainable Development, Environment, and Fight Against Climate Change

Rivière-du-Moulin Ecological Reserve (French: Réserve écologique de la Rivière-du-Moulin) is a strictly protected ecological reserve in the province of Quebec, Canada. It contains a stand of mature eastern hemlock (Tsuga canadensis) trees, with some white pines (Pinus strobus), a combination that was once common in Quebec but has almost disappeared due to forestry and farming.

== Location ==
The Rivière-du-Moulin ecological reserve was established by decree on 8 October 1975. It was the first such reserve in Quebec. It lies in the Saint Lawrence Lowlands within the Lotbinière municipality on the south shore of the Saint Lawrence River about 65 kilometres (40 mi) west of Quebec City.

The reserve covers 10.66 hectares (26.3 acres) on a terrace about 20 metres (66 ft) above sea level, formed when the ice cap receded about 12,000 years ago. Before 5800 years ago the forest site was probably about the same level as the Saint Lawrence River. It has since risen due to post-glacial rebound. The soil is thin and mainly clayey, covering shales. The soil of the hemlock forest is a well-drained or moderately well-drained podzol. The surrounding soil was farmland, abandoned since 1965, which has been disturbed by plowing.

The forest is locally known as the Bois du Domaine. It is bounded by the Marie-Victorin road and by the Ruisseau Saint-Eustache, which is also called Ruisseau du Domaine or Ruisseau du Moulin (Mill Stream). A flour mill began operation on the stream in 1693. In 1799 it was replaced by the current mill, known as the Moulin du Domaine, listed as a historical monument since 1964.

== Evolution ==
The forest is near the northern limit of the hemlock's range. Studies of pollen and tree trunks preserved in peat indicate that white pine preceded hemlock in the region, but the percentage of hemlock increased about 5,700 years ago. The two species may have formed mixed stands, as in the ecological reserve. Through most or all of the last 2400–2100 years hemlock was the dominant tree species in the region. The Rivière-du-Moulin forest is old-growth, at least 1,000 years old. Recurring surface fires have rejuvenated the structure of the forest by killing almost all plants growing in the shade on the floor of the forest, letting the hemlocks regenerate. Analysis of charcoal fragments indicates that up to 30 fire events could have happened since the mid-Holocene, with more events in recent years after European settlement in the region.

== Vegetation ==
The reserve protects an old and mature stand of eastern hemlock trees, with some white pines, a rare combination in Quebec. The hemlock grove covers almost half the reserve. The forest is made up of tall canopy trees, among which eastern hemlock is dominant. It also contains white pine, and in some areas has yellow birch (Betula alleghaniensis). This combination was once common in the Saint Lawrence Lowlands, but was largely destroyed by logging and farming. The protected area is the largest remaining high quality example of the ecosystem. The forest also contains as companion species American beech (Fagus grandifolia), red maple (Acer rubrum), eastern white cedar (Thuja occidentalis), and red oak (Quercus rubra) There are large sugar maple (Acer saccharum) trees at scattered locations.

90% of the forest floor is covered by a dense layer of twigs, branches and leaves, with dead tree trunks in different stages of decomposition. There are small patches of red-stemmed feathermoss (Pleurozium schreberi), and examples of tree groundpine (Dendrolycopodium dendroideum), shining clubmoss (Huperzia lucidula), threeleaf goldthread (Coptis trifolia) and spinulose woodfern (Dryopteris carthusiana). There are a few seedlings or saplings of balsam fir (Abies balsamea) and white spruce (Picea glauca). The shrub layer is dominated by eastern hemlock but also includes striped maple (Acer pensylvanicum) and American beech.

Surrounding the hemlock forest there is a young stand of mixed softwood and hardwood that has developed from a farm field after it was abandoned between 1965 and 1975. Species include large-toothed aspen (Populus grandidentata), trembling aspen (Populus tremuloides), paper birch (Betula papyrifera), yellow birch, and white pine. In areas where the soil is lighter and better drained the reserve is colonized by white pine and red oak. In small areas where the soil is heavier it has elm, black ash (Fraxinus nigra) or staghorn sumac (Rhus typhina).

== Sources ==
- Moss, William (2 December 2017), The Recent Archaeology of the Early Modern Period in Quebec City: 2009, Taylor & Francis, ISBN 978-1-351-19333-7
- Payette, Serge; Pilon, Vanessa; Couillard, Pierre-Luc; Frégeau, Mathieu (2015), "Holocene dynamics of an eastern hemlock (Tsuga canadensis) forest site at the northern range of the species limit", The Holocene, 25 (8), Sage: 1246–1256, doi:10.1177/0959683615580863, S2CID 140638782
- Réserve écologique de la Rivière-du-Moulin (in French), Ministère de l'Environnement et de la Lutte contre les changements climatiques (Quebec)
- Rivière-du-Moulin, Réserve écologique de la (in French), MRC Lotbinière
