= Sainte-Rose-du-Nord, Quebec =

Sainte-Rose-du-Nord
- Parish municipality
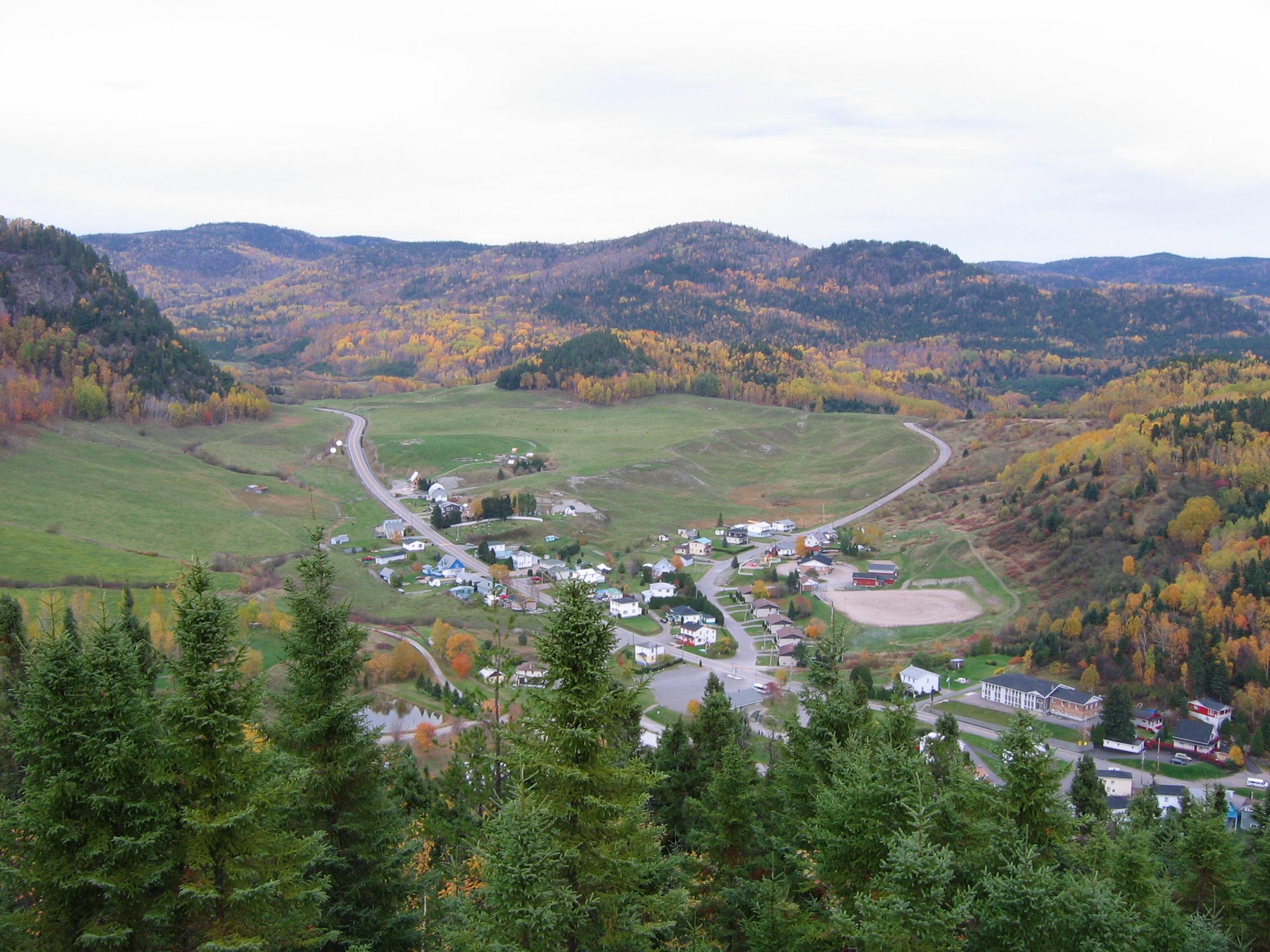

- Location in Saguenay–Lac-Saint-Jean Quebec.
- Coordinates: 48°23′N 70°35′W
- Country: Canada
- Province: Quebec
- Region: Saguenay–Lac-Saint-Jean
- RCM: Le Fjord-du-Saguenay
- Settled: 1838
- Constituted: January 1, 1942

Government
  - Mayor: Laurent Thibeault
  - Federal riding: Chicoutimi—Le Fjord
  - Prov. riding: Dubuc

Area
  - Total: 156.40 km^{2} (60.39 sq mi)
  - Land: 115.88 km^{2} (44.74 sq mi)

Population (2011)
  - Total: 413
  - Density: 3.6/km^{2} (9.3/sq mi)
  - Pop (2006–11): ▼6.3%
  - Dwellings: 335
- Time zone: UTC−5 (EST)
  - Summer (DST): UTC−4 (EDT)
- Postal code(s): G0V 1T0
- Area codes: 418 and 581
- Website: www.ste-rosedunord.qc.ca

Sainte-Rose-du-Nord (French pronunciation: [sɛ̃t ʁoz dy nɔʁ]) is a village on the north shore of the Saguenay River in Quebec, Canada.

The site was known, from 1801 to 1933, as La Descente-des-Femmes. Amerindian women awaited the return of the men from fishing, and would meet them by descending from the heights to the shore. The patron saint of the parish, Rose of Lima, chosen for reasons unknown, was the first saint canonised in the New World. The specifier -du-Nord was added in 1933, when the post office was established. Residents are known as Roserains.

The parish was first established in 1838. The economy is based primarily on tourism. The village is a member of the Association of the Most Beautiful Villages of Quebec. There has been some agriculture and logging. Formerly, wood was floated from the wharf to paper mills. Today, many residents work in Chicoutimi 35 km up river to the west.

The site is on the north shore of the Saguenay River. The site is in a cove with a wharf. The village is set back from the river, on hilly terrain.

It is a parish municipality in the Le Fjord-du-Saguenay Regional County Municipality within the region of Saguenay–Lac-Saint-Jean.

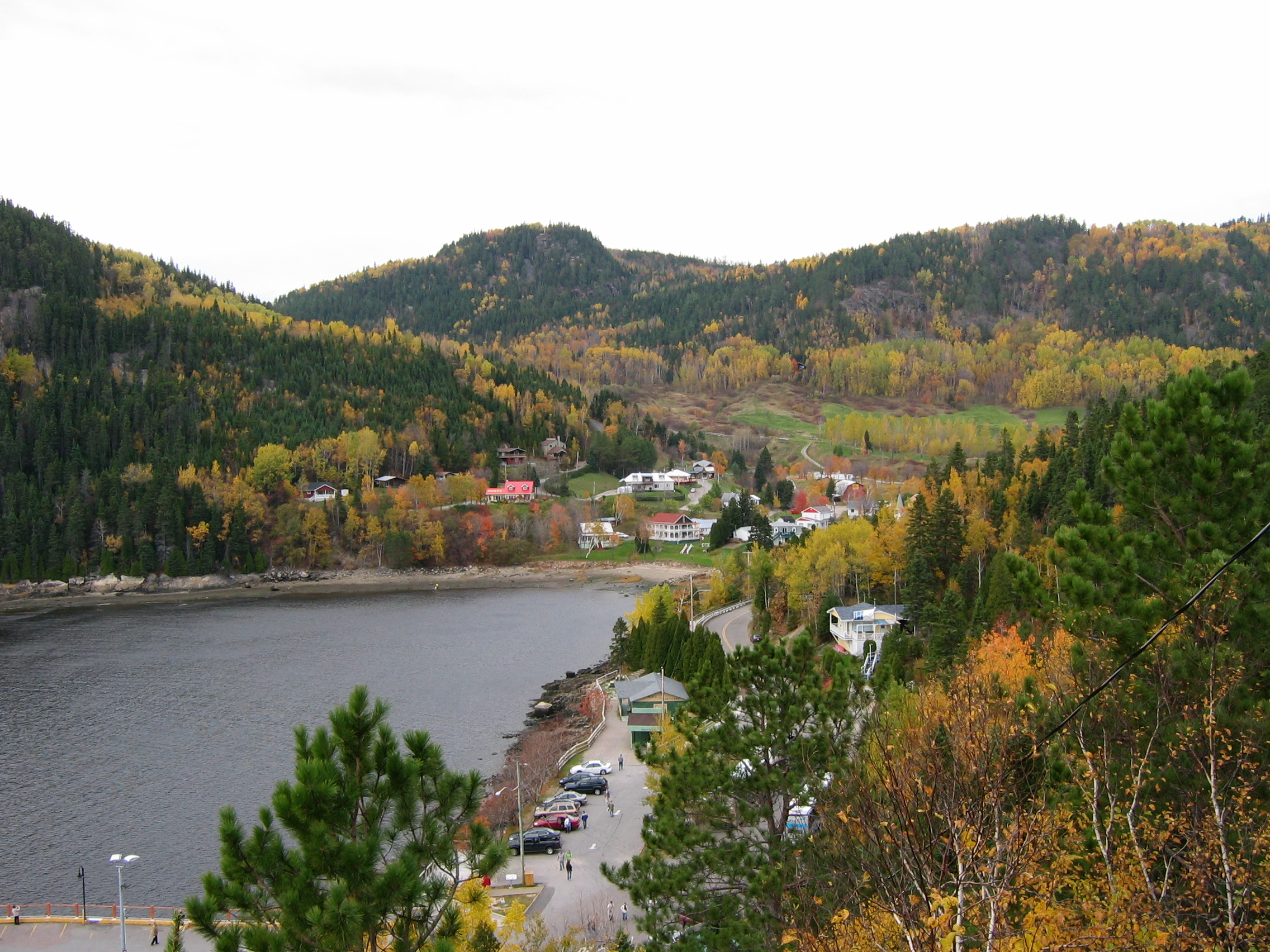
Théophile Cove, Sainte-Rose-du-Nord

== Demographics ==
In the 2021 Census of Population conducted by Statistics Canada, Sainte-Rose-du-Nord had a population of 434 living in 217 of its 261 total private dwellings, a change of −1.1% from its 2016 population of 439. With a land area of 116.61 km^{2} (45.02 sq mi), it had a population density of 3.7/km^{2} (9.6/sq mi) in 2021.

== See also ==
- Le Bonheur de Pierre: 2009 comedy-drama filmed in Sainte-Rose-du-Nord.
- Vallée-de-la-Rivière-Sainte-Marguerite Biodiversity Reserve
