= The Most Beautiful Villages in the World =

Non-profit organization founded 2012

- Formation: 2012
- Type: Non-profit association
- Purpose: Promotion and enhancement of history, landscape, culture and tourism
- Location: Collonges-la-Rouge, France
- Region served: Worldwide
- Members: 7 + 5 associates
- President: Alain Di Stefano
- Website: lpbvt.org

The Most Beautiful Villages in the World is a non-profit private international organization that brings together various territorial associations promoting small inhabited centers of particular historical and landscape interest.

== Characteristics ==
The institution was founded in 2012 in Gordes (France) by five associations belonging to as many geographical areas: France, Japan, Italy, Québec (Canada) and Wallonia (Belgium). Spain and Switzerland also joined later.

These territories are represented within The Most Beautiful Villages in the World by the following local associations:

- France: Les plus beaux villages de France, created in 1982 and comprising 180 villages;
- Belgium: Les Plus Beaux Villages de Wallonie, created in 1994 and comprising 32 villages;
- Italy: I Borghi più belli d'Italia, created in 2001 and including 363 villages;
- Japan: The Most Beautiful Villages in Japan, created in 2005 and including 58 villages;
- Spain: Los Pueblos Más Bonitos de España, created in 2011 and including 122 villages;
- Switzerland: Les plus beaux villages de Suisse, created in 2015, including 51 villages and to which the Principality of Liechtenstein is also annexed;
- Canada: Association of the Most Beautiful Villages of Quebec, created in 1997 and comprising 39 villages;

They are joined by 5 associated members, Switzerland, Saxony (Germany), Russia, Lebanon, and Bosnia whose local associations are:

- Germany: Sachsens Schönste Dörfer, created in 2011 and including 9 villages;
- Russia: The Most Beautiful Villages in Russia, created in 2003 and comprising 11 villages;
- Lebanon: The Most Beautiful Villages in Lebanon, created in 2016 and comprising 60 villages;
- Bosnia: The Most Beautiful Villages in Bosnia and Herzegovina, created in 2022 and comprising 17 villages;
- China: The Most Beautiful Villages in China, created in 2019 and comprising 67 villages;

== Gallery ==
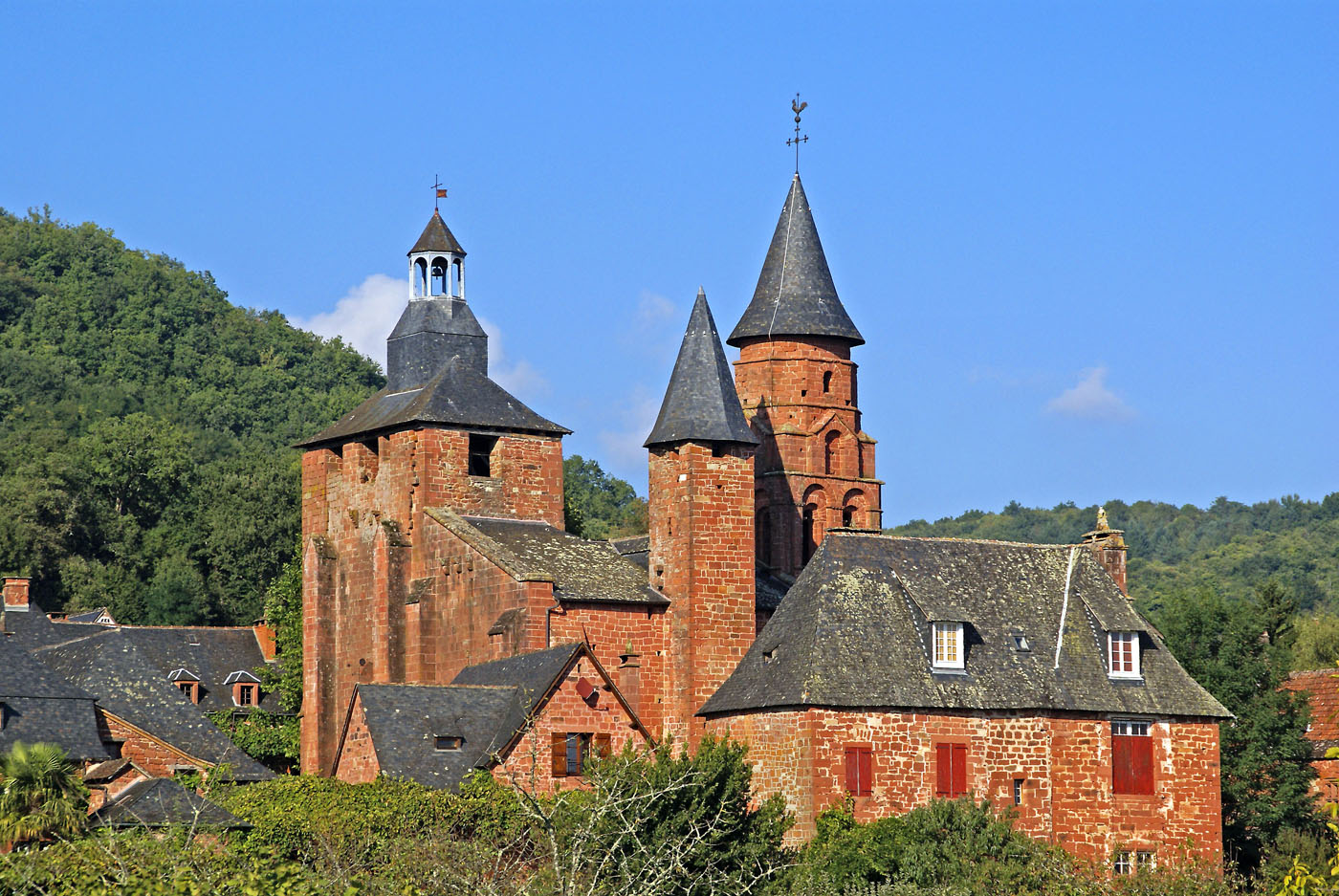
Collonges-la-Rouge, France

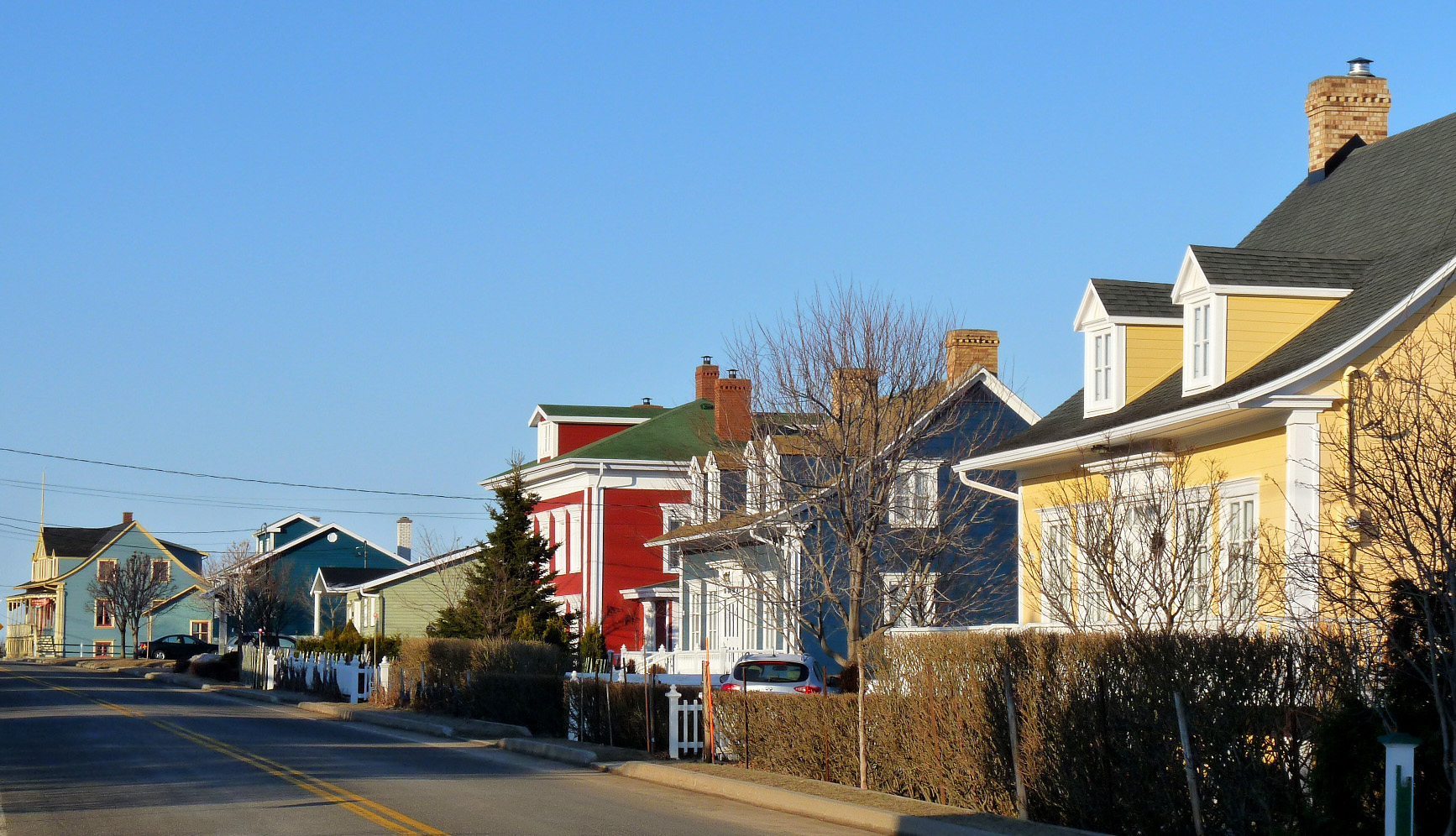
Kamouraska, Canada

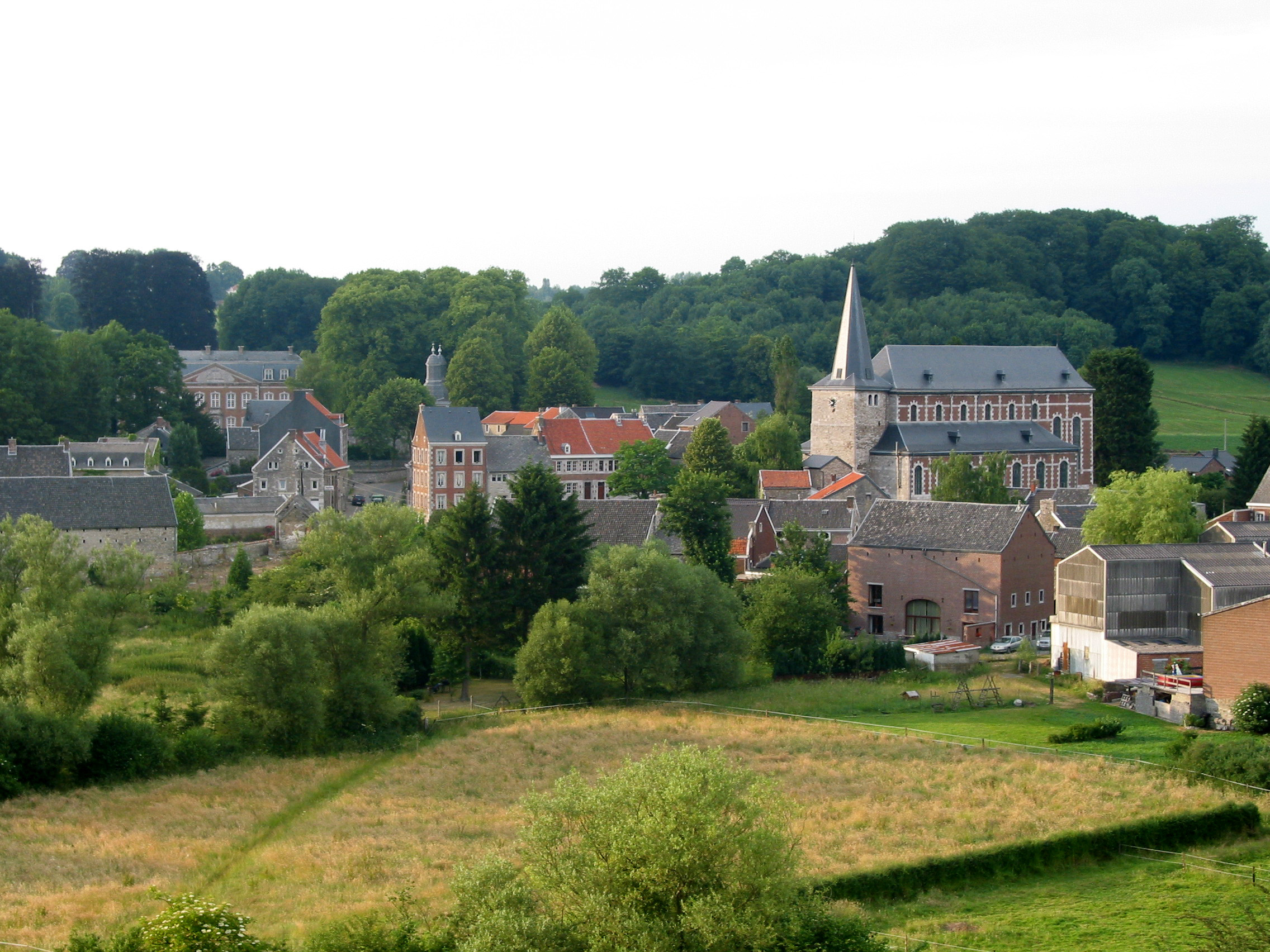
Soiron, Belgium

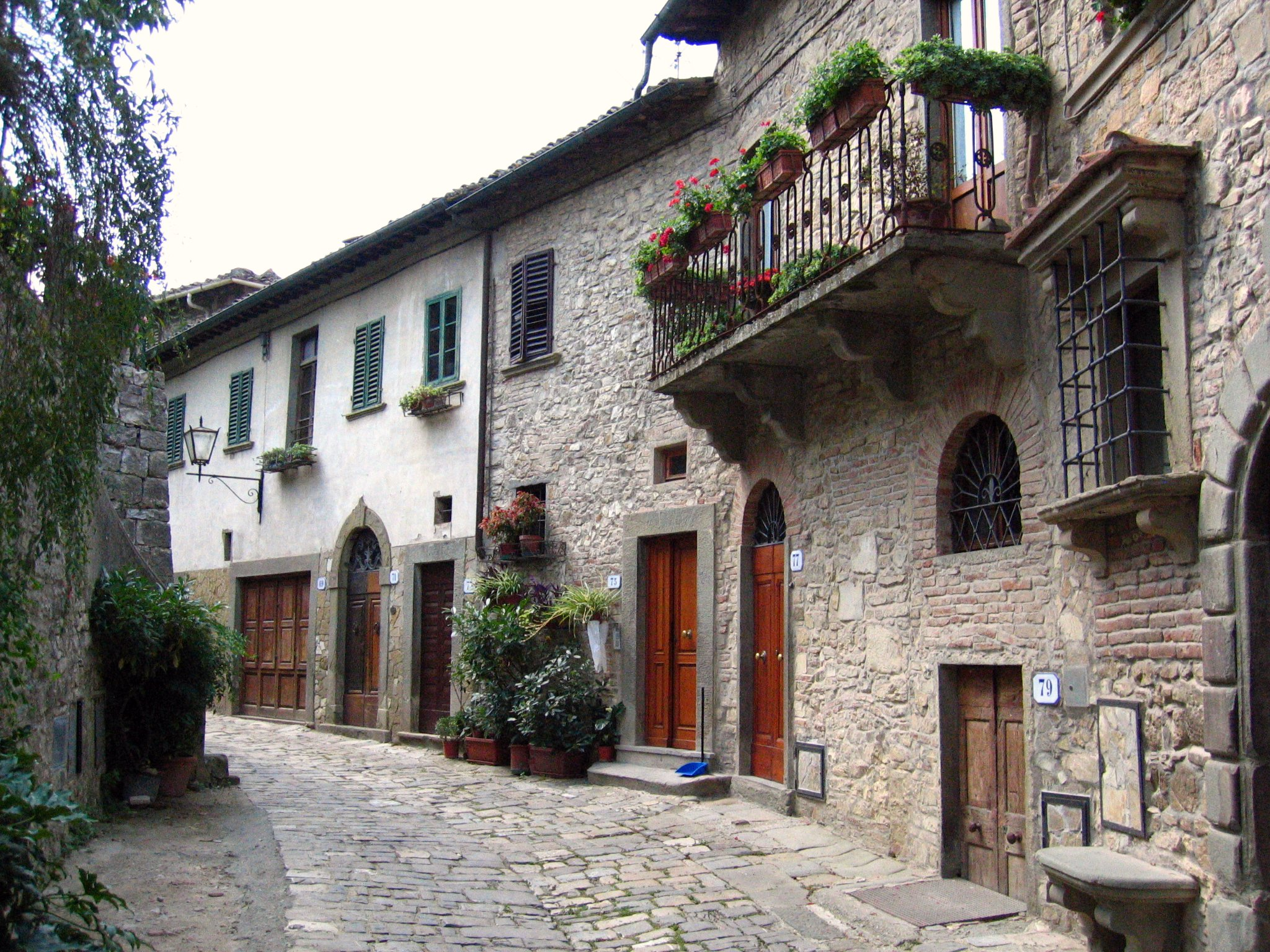
Montefioralle, Italy

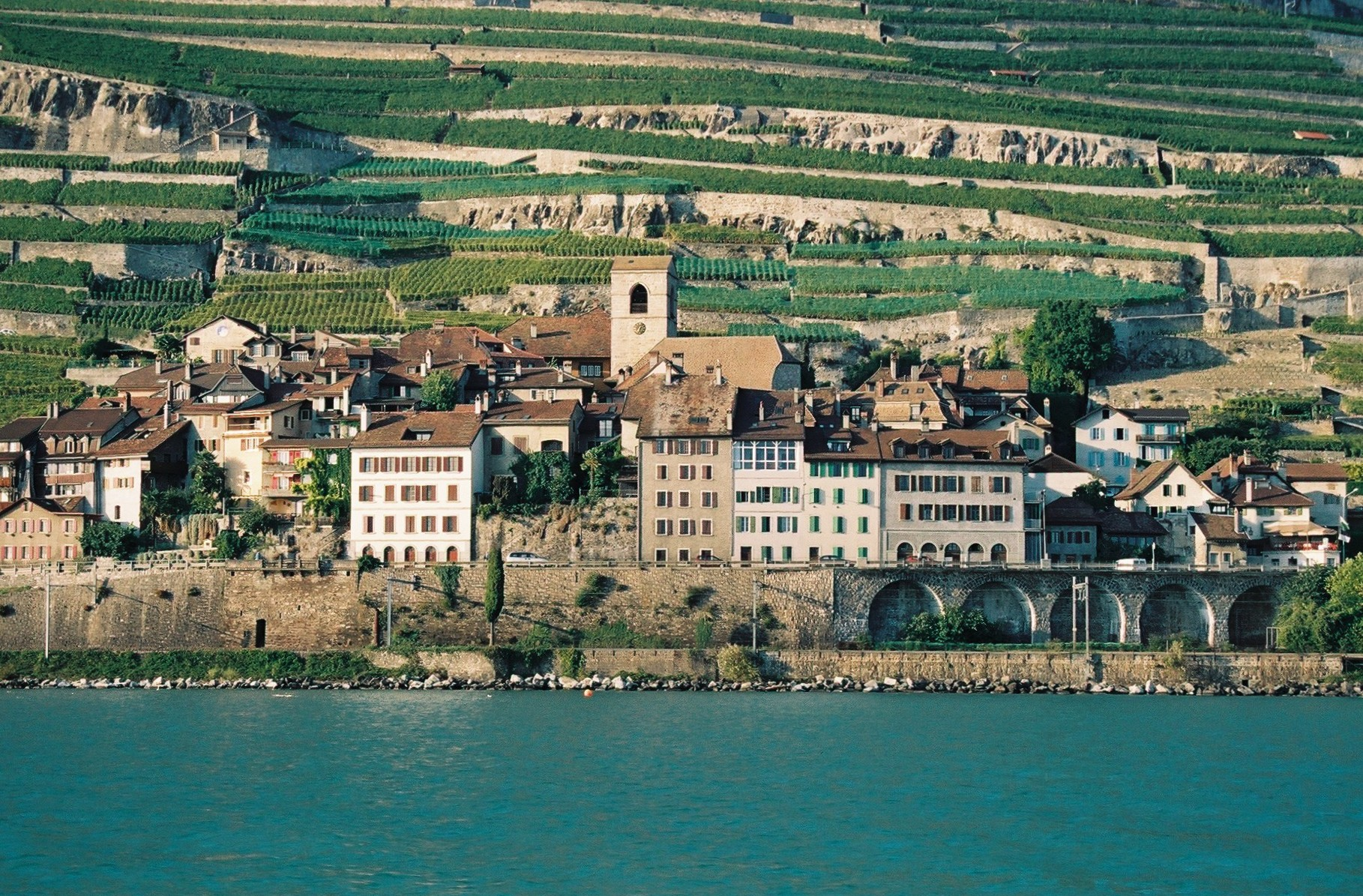
Saint-Saphorin, Switzerland

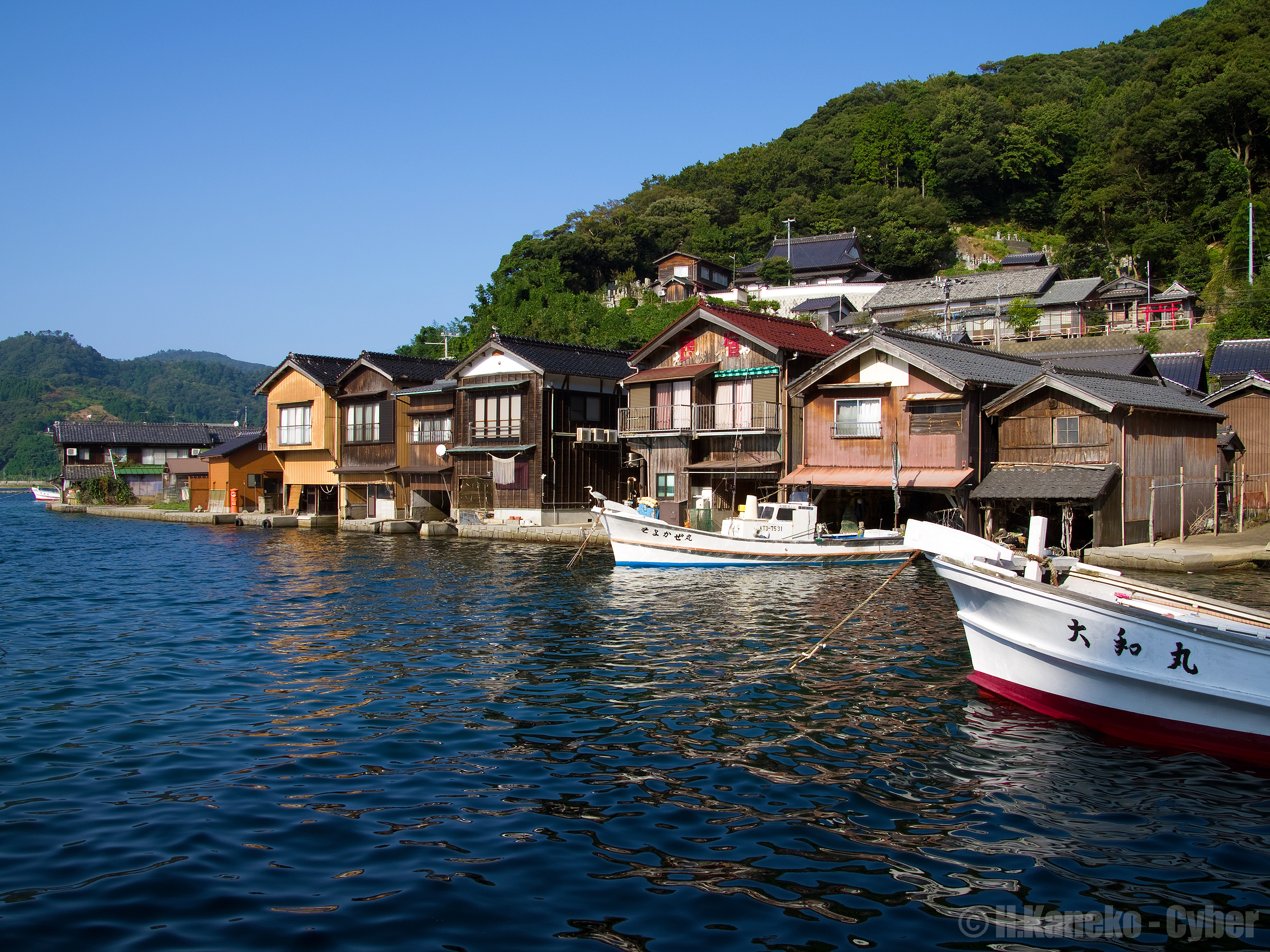
Ine, Japan

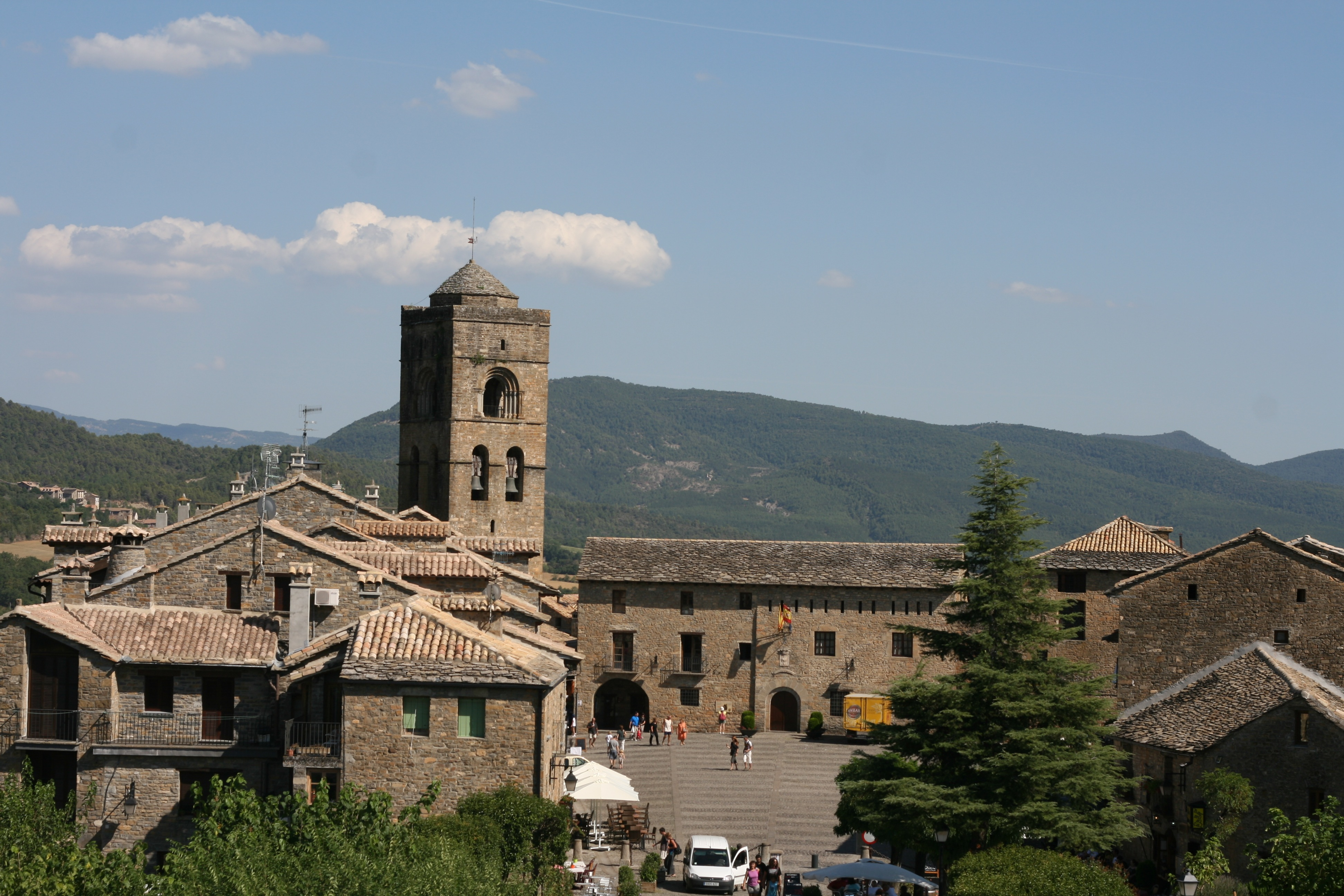
Aínsa-Sobrarbe, Spain

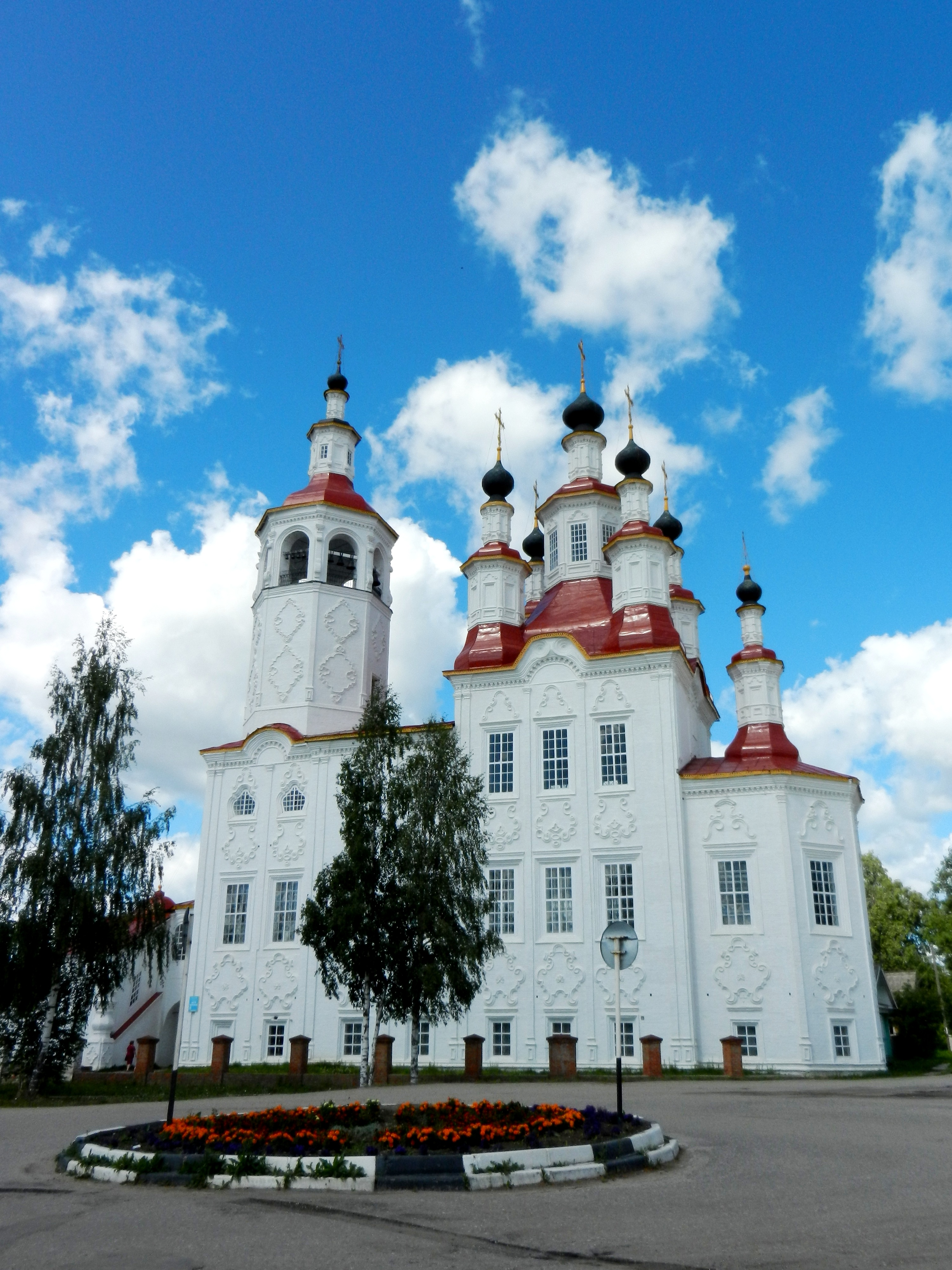
Totma, Russia

== See also ==
- Les Plus Beaux Villages de France
