= Association of the Most Beautiful Villages of Quebec =

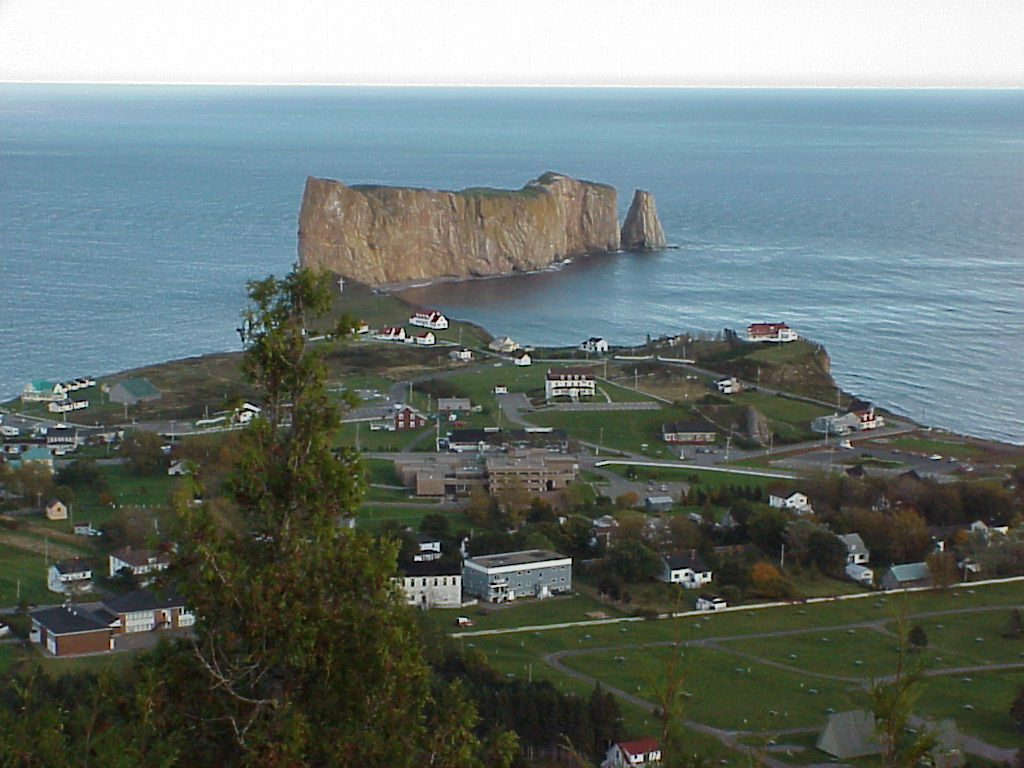
An aerial view of the village of Percé, Quebec, and its famous rock, taken from Mont-Sainte-Anne

The Association of the Most Beautiful Villages of Quebec (French: Association des plus beaux villages du Québec, pronounced [asɔsjɑsjɔ̃ de ply bo vilaʒ dy kebɛk]) is an association created in 1997 by Jean-Marie Girardville and inspired from similar associations in France, Belgium, and Italy. Its objective is to promote the preservation and the enhancement of the architectural and historical heritage of villages in Quebec, as well as the quality of their landscape. As of 2009, it had 37 village members located in 10 different regions. It is affiliated to the international association The Most Beautiful Villages in the World.

== List of village members ==
- Cacouna
- Calixa-Lavallée
- Cap-Santé
- Champlain
- Côte-Nord-du-Golfe-du-Saint-Laurent
- Deschambault-Grondines
- Dudswell
- Frelighsburg
- Hudson
- Inverness
- Kamouraska
- Lac-Brome
- L'Anse-Saint-Jean
- Les Éboulements
- Les Îles-de-la-Madeleine
- L'Islet
- Lotbinière
- Métis-sur-Mer
- Neuville
- Notre-Dame-du-Portage
- Percé
- Sainte-Pétronille
- Sainte-Rose-du-Nord
- Saint-Antoine-de-Tilly
- Saint-Antoine-sur-Richelieu
- Saint-Denis-sur-Richelieu
- Saint-Irénée
- Saint-Jean-de-l'Île-d'Orléans
- Saint-Laurent-de-l'Île-d'Orléans
- Saint-Michel-de-Bellechasse
- Saint-Pacôme
- Saint-Siméon
- Saint-Vallier
- Stanbridge East
- Stanstead
- Tadoussac
- Verchères

== See also ==
- Les Plus Beaux Villages de France
- The most beautiful villages in Italy
- Les Plus Beaux Villages de Wallonie
