= Château Beauce =

1903 residence in Nouvelle-Beauce, Quebec

- Monastery of the Oblate Sisters of Bethany; House of Notre-Dame-du-Rosaire
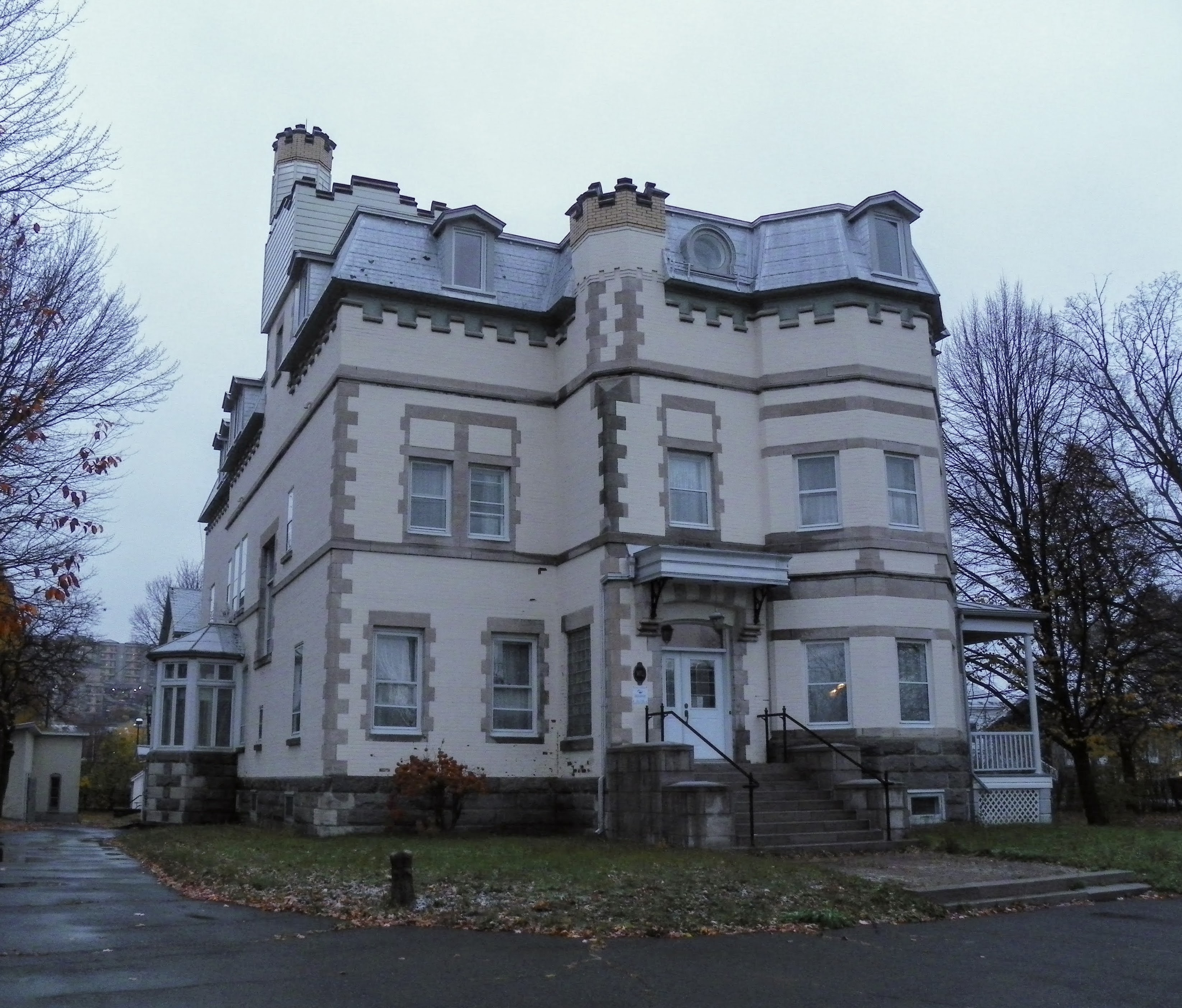
- The main pavilion.

- Location within Southern Quebec
- 46°26′13″N 71°01′15″W

History
- Founded: 1903-1904

Site notes
- Architect: Jean-Omer Marchand
- Architectural style: Eclecticism
- Owner: Chaudière-Appalaches Alzheimer Society

Patrimoine culturel du Québec
- Part of: Château-Beauce heritage site
- Original purpose: Student residence
- Current purpose: Vacant

The Château Beauce, once known as the Monastery of the Oblate Sisters of Bethany or House of Our lady of the Rosary, is a former bourgeois residence built in 1903, located in the heart of downtown Sainte-Marie in Nouvelle-Beauce, Quebec (Canada). The eclectic-style house is of heritage interest for historical and architectural reasons. Initially occupied by notables, it was ceded in 1932 to religious communities who transformed it into a convent, then a monastery.

Threatened with demolition in 2018, then damaged by the historic 2019 Quebec, Ontario and New Brunswick floods, Château Beauce has been protected by the Quebec Minister of Culture and Communications since 2020.

== History ==
=== Residential use ===
In 1903, Georges-Siméon Théberge and Ernest Larue, two notaries who had been partners since 1887, acquired land from Gabriel-Narcisse-Achille Fortier, a descendant of the Taschereau lords of Sainte-Marie. Georges-Siméon Théberge, a prosperous investor, commissioned a firm of young architects, Jean-Omer Marchand and Samuel Stevens Haskell, to draw up plans for a residence for his family and that of his partner.

The designers created a building in an unusual style for Quebec outside the Montreal Anglo-Canadian bourgeoisie, reflecting the success of the Beauce businessman. The masonry work was entrusted to Lévis contractor Joseph Couture, but it is not yet known who carried out the carpentry and joinery. A dairy and stable were built around the same time as the residence.

In 1932, a mission of the Sisters of the Immaculate Conception was founded by the notaries and the sister of Théberge. The nuns took up residence in the stable, which was converted into a convent. The property was donated to the religious congregation on condition that Théberge and Larue retained usufruct of the property until their deaths, and that the building be used for religious purposes in perpetuity. In 1937, in anticipation of the conversion of the entire residence into a convent, a 3rd floor gambrel was added to accommodate bedrooms. Architect Jean-Berchmans Gagnon prepared the plans, and Irénée Giguère was in charge of the project.

Modifications over time
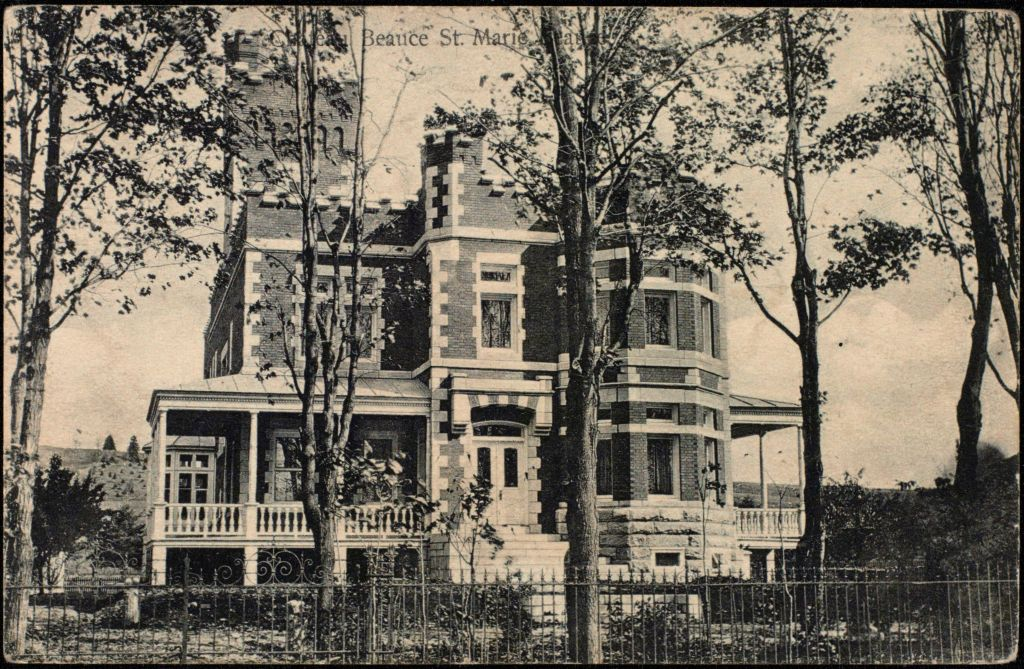
The château shortly after its construction.

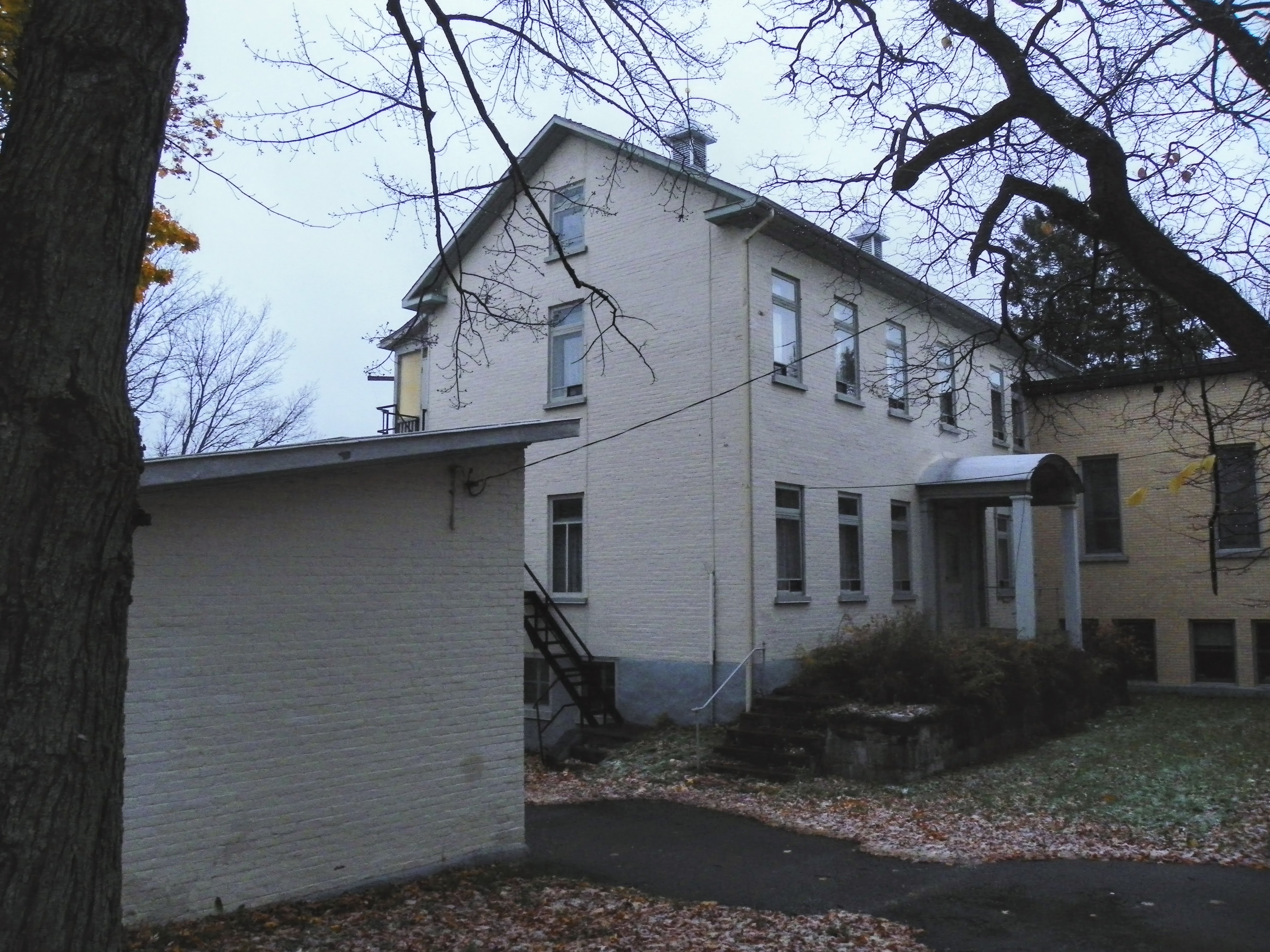
The stable was converted into a convent in 1932.

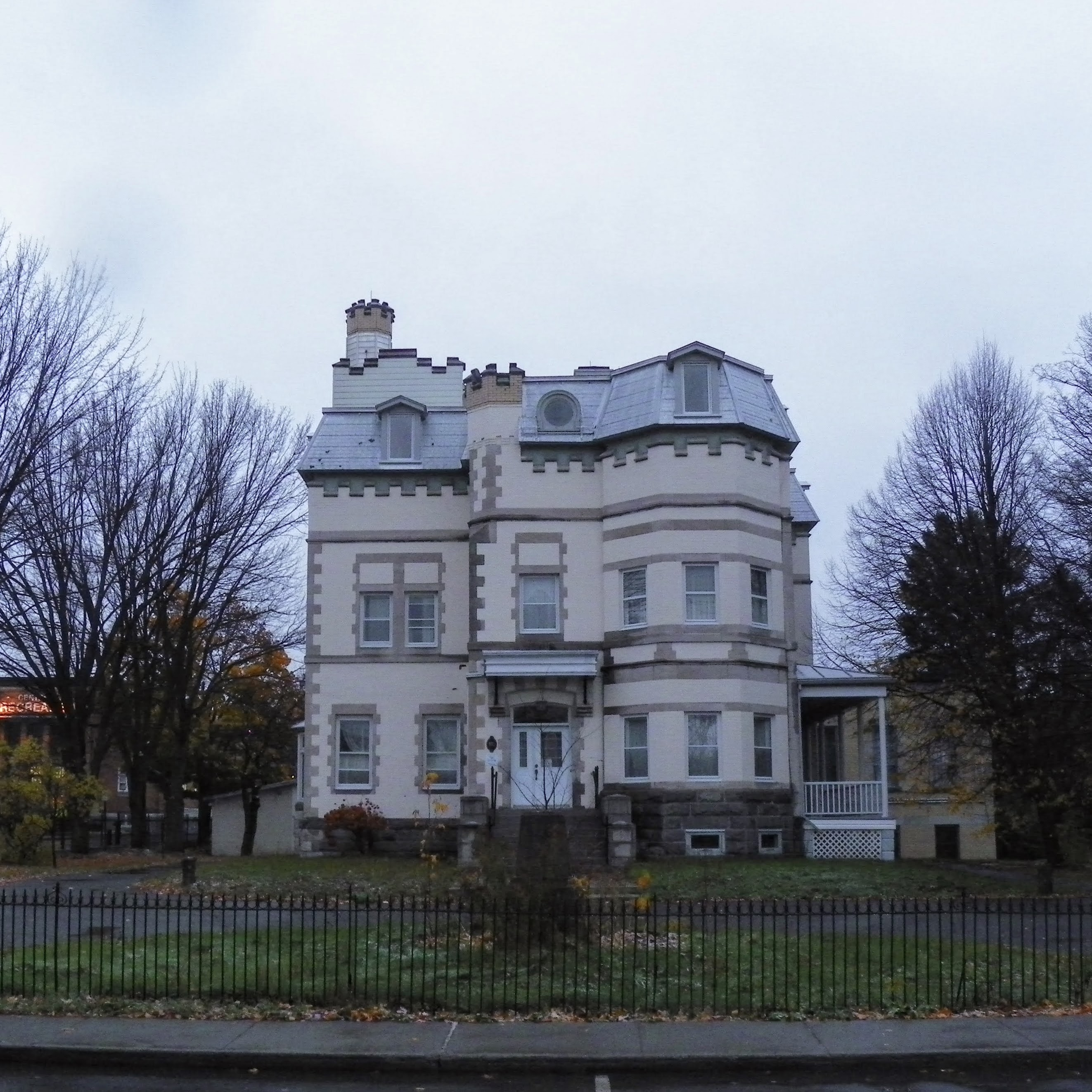
A third floor was added in 1937.

=== Religious use ===
Théberge died in 1940 and Larue left the residence in 1943. When he left, a chapel was built to convert the entire building to religious use. The plans are presumed to have been prepared by Raoul Chênevert. From 1944 to 1967, the building, named "Maison Notre-Dame-du-Rosaire", was occupied by the Missionary Sisters of the Immaculate Conception, who offered closed retreats for women and girls.

The Oblates of Bethany took over the house in 1967 as their convent. An infirmary was added behind the stable in 1988, according to plans prepared by D'Anjou, Bernard et Mercier Architectes. In 2014, the congregation vacated the building. It had the contractual clause obliging it to perpetuate the religious vocation lifted in the Superior Court of Quebec, and the following year donated the building to the Alzheimer Society of Chaudière-Appalaches. The latter did not occupy the building, as it lacked the CAD $4,000,000 needed to adapt it for people with cognitive impairments.

Current state of buildings
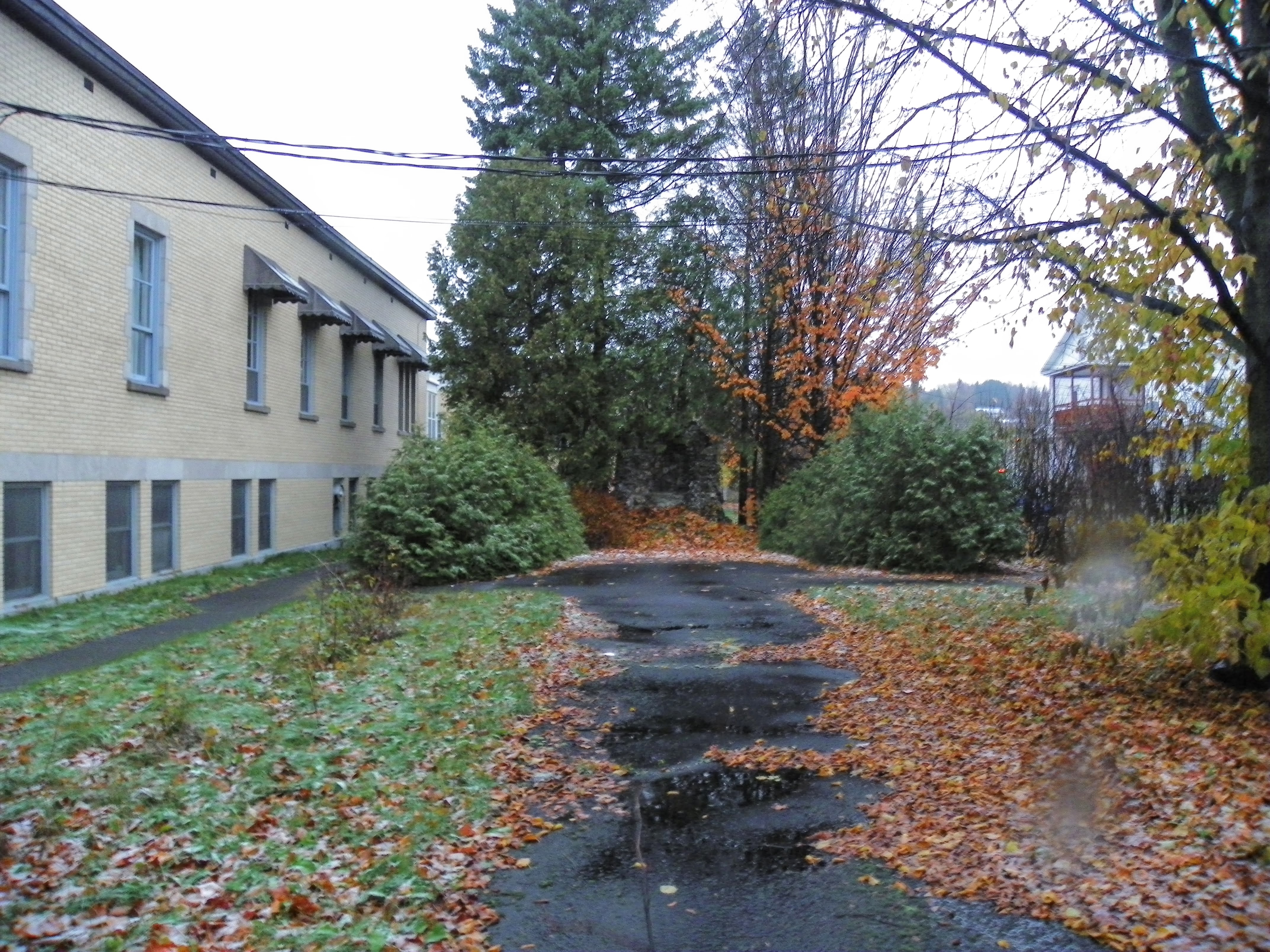
The gardens in front of the chapel, built in 1943.

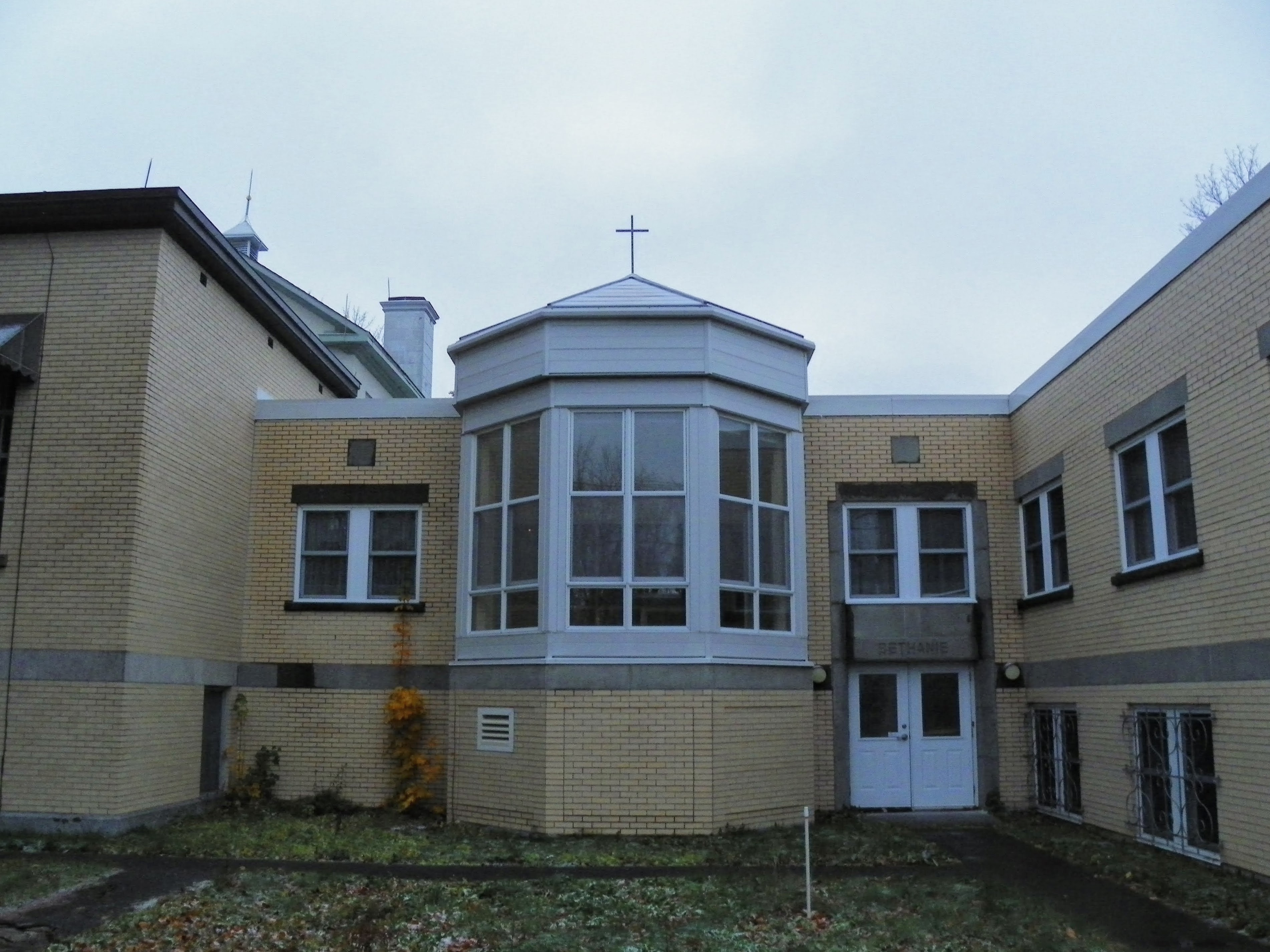
Oriel window on the footbridge linking the chapel to the infirmary.

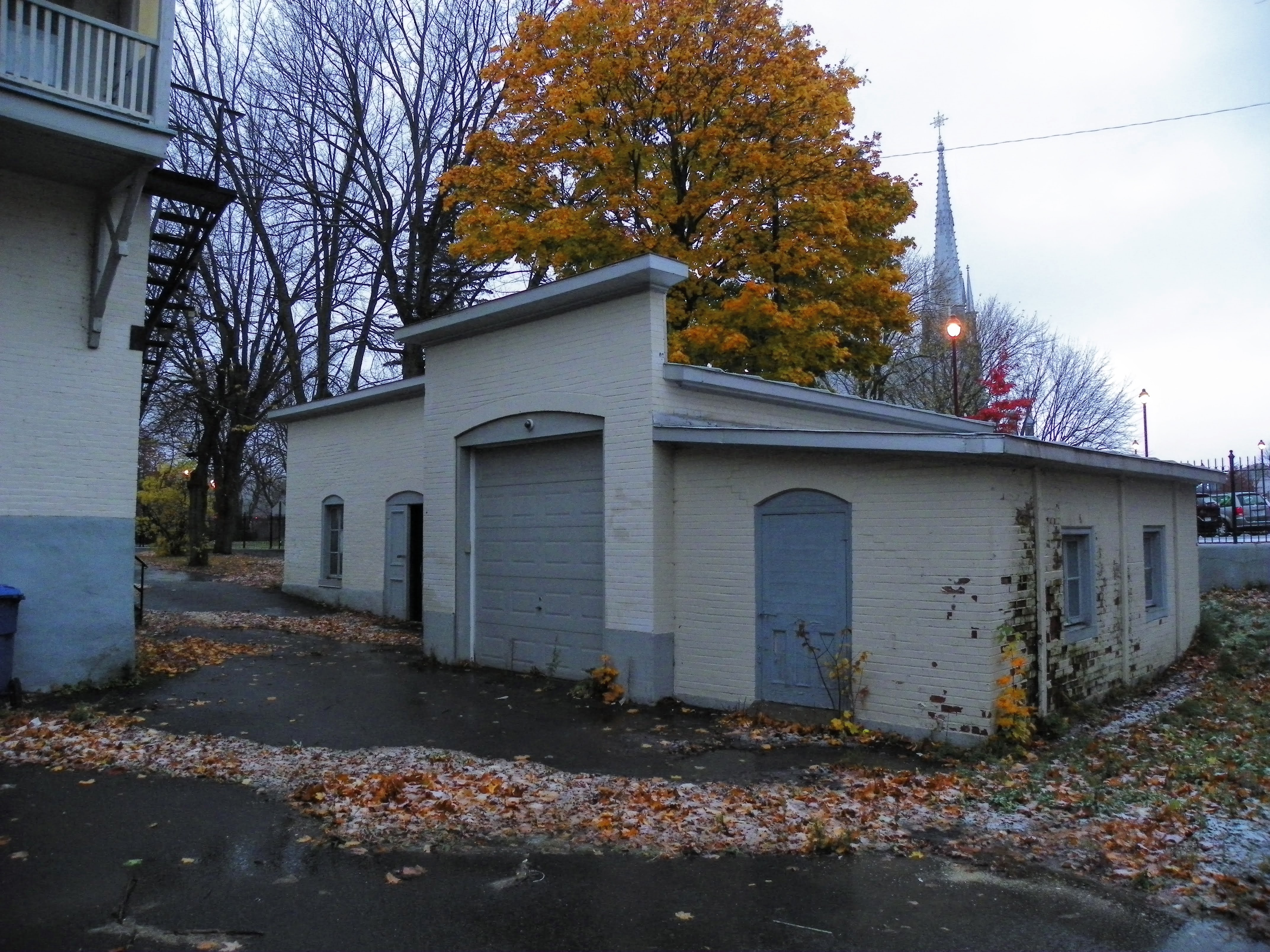
The dairy was converted into a garage.

=== Threat of demolition and protection ===
The demolition of the building, then in "excellent condition", was announced for 2018 to make way for a retirement home. The Ministry of Culture and Communications was alerted by a lawyer and an urban planner, who denounced the primacy given by the City of Sainte-Marie to private interests over the preservation of the common good. On the very day she was sworn in, Minister of culture Nathalie Roy issued a notice of intent to classify, temporarily protecting the building, both its shell and its contents.

Château Beauce was flooded during the historic 2019 Quebec, Ontario and New Brunswick floods. In the absence of occupants, the interior of the building was not dried out quickly enough, and mold developed in the basement. Flood repairs were estimated at CAD $700,000. The Alzheimer Society of Chaudière-Appalaches was looking to sell, but the work involved was scaring off potential buyers.

In the fall of 2019, the notice of intent to classify was renewed, extending the temporary protection for another year.

In the spring of 2020, the Alzheimer Society of Chaudière-Appalaches could no longer financially support the building it had been given: monthly expenses reached CAD $2,750 in heating and CAD $500 in insurance. Potential buyers had come forward, but the high costs had put them off.

The Château Beauce residence, and the site it occupies, were classified as a heritage building in October 2020, having reached the "extreme limit" of its temporary protection status.

== Architecture ==
Château Beauce is an irregularly-planned, 3-storey, above-ground building. It is set back from the public thoroughfare on a garden plot in the heart of the institutional core of downtown Sainte-Marie, adjacent to the clergy house, the church, former fire station, town hall and public library. The residence features an eclectic, Tudor and Queen Ann-inspired style, hardly ever found in Quebec outside the merchant suburbs of Montreal and Quebec City. It was probably the first project in Quebec by Jean-Omer Marchand, the first Canadian to graduate from the Beaux-Arts de Paris and one of the most influential Quebec architects of the early 20th century.

The exterior walls are clad in light-colored brick. The bricks of the stable, dairy and residence are painted, while those of the chapel and infirmary are stained. A tower with machicolations and battlements, topped by a turret, serves as an observation tower.

The interior of the residence is "well preserved". Intricate plaster moldings crown the walls and chambranles. The marble and granite fireplaces are still functional. Carved woodwork, coffered ceilings, stained-glass windows and glazing on doors, transoms and storm windows are representative of the eclectic style. The original plans included four full bathrooms on the first floor, an unprecedented luxury for a house of the period. The stairwell, whose walls are covered with the original hangings, is lit by mullioned cross-windows with stained glass. The monumental staircase is made of carved wood.

The chapel annex bears witness to the change of vocation of the building complex.

== See also ==
- List of historic places in Chaudière-Appalaches
