= Moulin du Portage =

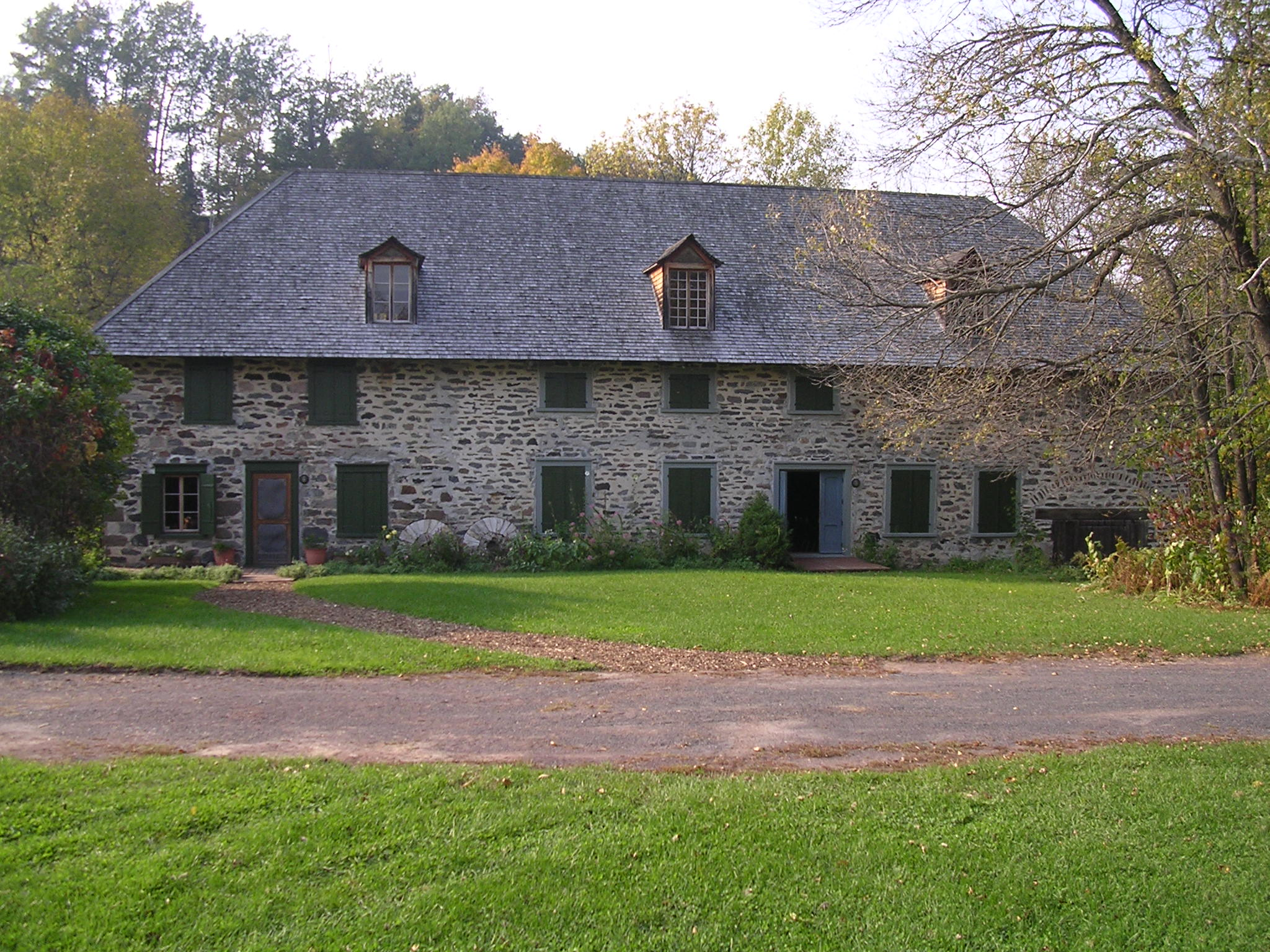
- Moulin du Portage in Lotbinière

- Location within Quebec

General information
- Type: Water-powered grinding mill
- Classification: Heritage building (Immeuble patrimonial) 30 September 1964
- Location: 1080, rang Saint-François, Lotbinière, Quebec, Canada
- Coordinates: 46.554561°N 71.970168°W
- Completed: 1816

Technical details
- Material: Stone masonry
- Floor count: 2 ½

Website
- www.moulinduportage.com

The Moulin du Portage (Portage Mill) is a historical water-powered flour mill in the Chaudière-Appalaches region of the province of Quebec, Canada. It is classified as a heritage building. It was destroyed by fire in 1988, apart from the stone walls, but was rebuilt according to the original plans and is now used as a performance hall.

== Location ==
The mill is located in a deep valley within a loop of the Chêne River. It is in the Lotbinière municipality in the Chaudière-Appalaches administrative region of Quebec. It is to the west of the village of Lotbinière, and is connected by a 4.2 kilometres (2.6 mi) hiking trail to the village of Leclercville. It is hidden by a grove of trees, and is connected to the public highway by a small path. It is classified as a heritage building, and the land is also protected. The site includes an archaeological site that is included in the inventory of archaeological sites in Quebec.

== Structure ==
The present structure was rebuilt from the masonry square which survived a fire in 1988. It is a very elongated rectangular building with two storeys and an attic with sloping ceilings. It has rubble stone walls embedded in mortar on stone foundations. The hipped roof is wooden, covered in cedar shingles. It has rectangular casement windows with small glass panes. The windows, doors and gable dormers have an irregular arrangement.

The mill was powered by water brought from the river along a canal to a large undershot water wheel. At some point a dam was built across the river to increase the volume of water delivered to the mill. At the turn of the century the wheel was replaced by turbines.

== History ==
In 1672 the intendant Jean Talon granted the seigneury of Lotbinière to René-Louis Chartier de Lotbinière (1641-1709). The seigneur reserved an estate for himself, as was normal at the time. A flour mill began operation on the Ruisseau Saint-Eustache in 1693. It was a "banal mill" (moulin banal), built to meet the seigneur's obligation to build a flour mill for the people of the seigneury. They had to have their grain ground there and had to pay a milling fee, the droit de banalité. In 1769 the seigneur built a new mill, and in 1799 this was replaced by the present Moulin du Domaine.

At the start of the 19th century the fourth seigneur of Lotbinière, Michel-Eustache-Gaspard-Alain Chartier de Lotbinière (1748-1822), noted that the supply of water to the mill decreased significantly each summer, reducing its productivity. After trying to remedy the problem, he had a second mill, the Moulin du Portage, built on the banks of the Chêne River, starting in 1815. The machinery was built by Louis Lemay, a carpenter from Lotbinière. The Moulin du Portage was also a banal mill. The mill, manor house and church formed the nucleus of the seigneury in the 19th century.

The Moulin du Portage was operated throughout the 19th century despite persistent problems with the water supply. The mill was not profitable, even when it also served as a sawmill for a few years. Spring floods regularly caused great damage. The miller Télesphore Demers and his wife Éloïse Beaudet occupied the mill in 1854, and their family continued to work the mill until the machinery was destroyed by a surge of water in 1929. The seigneur decided not to repair the damage since the water mill could no longer compete with industrial flour mills. Rural electrification arrived around 1945. The mill was reopened and from 1947 to 1952 was used to grind animal feed.

After being abandoned the mill was neglected and vandalized until a group of citizens managed to obtain subsidies from the Ministry of Cultural Affairs of Quebec. The Moulin du Portage was listed as a heritage building (Immeuble patrimonial) on 30 September 1964. The Société des Amis du Moulin du Portage (Association of Friends of Portage Mill) was formed in 1979, and after three years of restoration it opened to the public as an auditorium. On 17 May 1988 a fire in the night destroyed the building apart from the four stone walls. The Société des Amis managed to obtain funding to rebuild it, faithfully following architectural surveys, so it could reopen five years later.

== Gallery ==
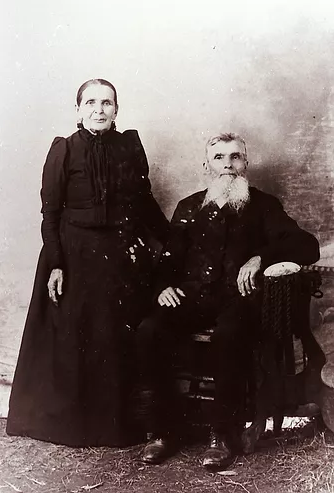
Télesphore Demers and Éloïse Beaudet around 1900

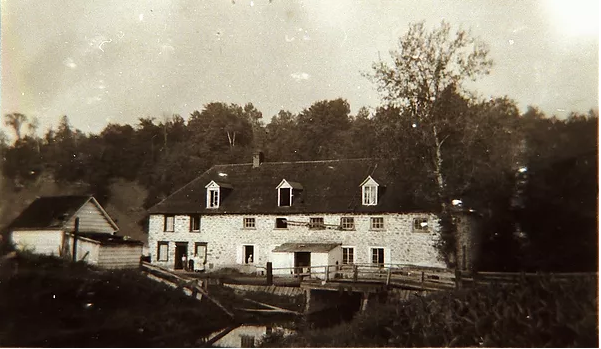
Moulin du Portage in opération around 1917

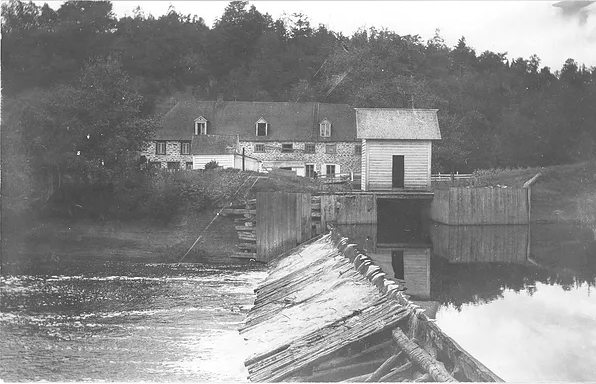
Moulin du Portage in operation with the diversion dam around 1925

== Sources ==
- Historique (in French), Moulin du Portage
- "Le moulin du Portage", Journées des moulins (in French), Association des moulins du Québec
- Le Moulin du Portage (in French), Moulin du Portage
- Moulin du Domaine-de-Lotbinière (in French), Gouvernement du Québec, 2013
- Moulin du Portage (in French), Gouvernement du Québec, 2013
- Rivière-du-Moulin, Réserve écologique de la (in French), MRC Lotbinière
