= Saint-Antoine-de-Tilly =

- Municipality
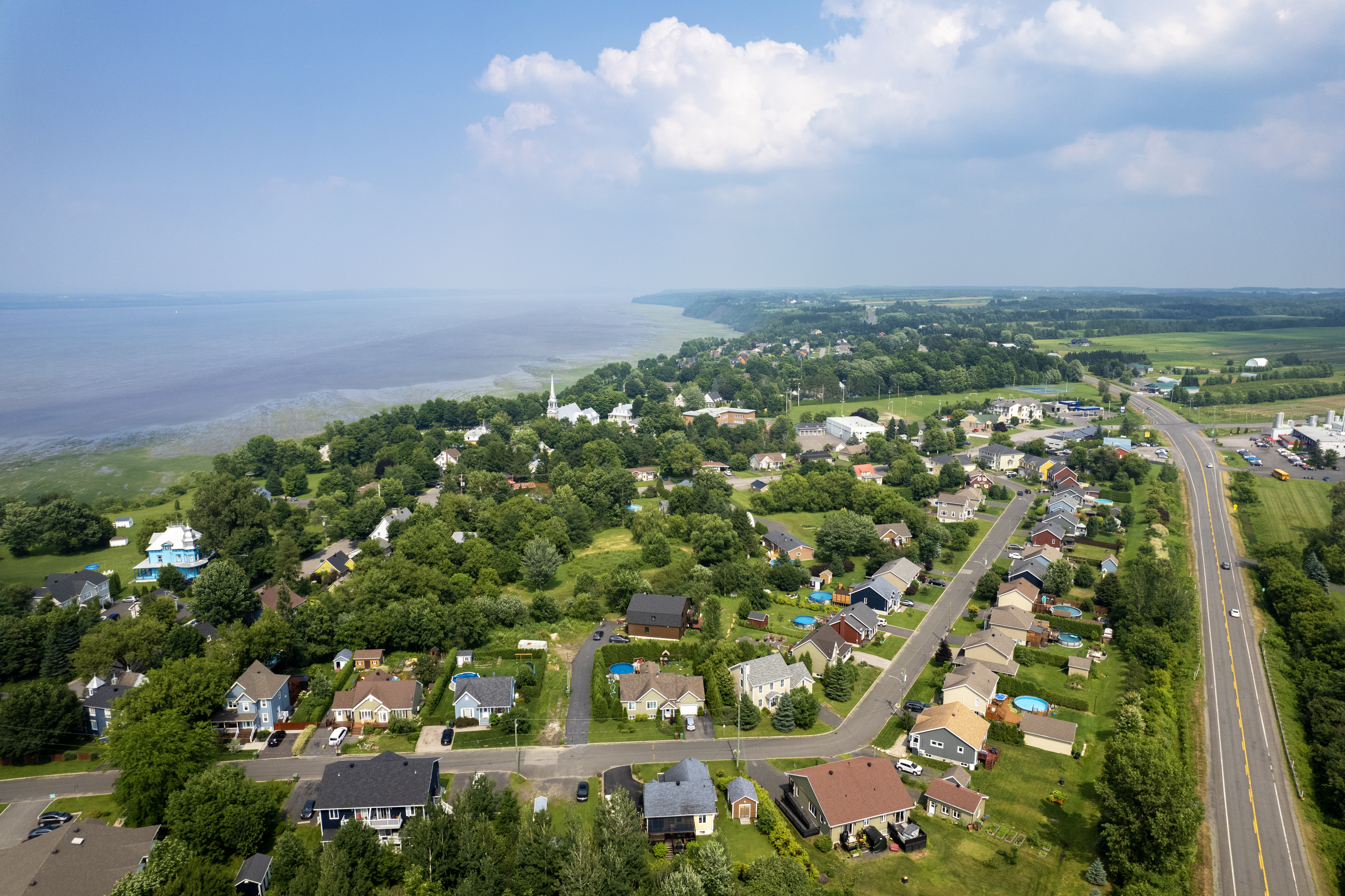
- Aerial view of Saint-Antoine-de-Tilly

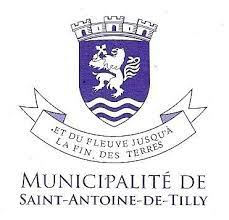
- Coat of arms

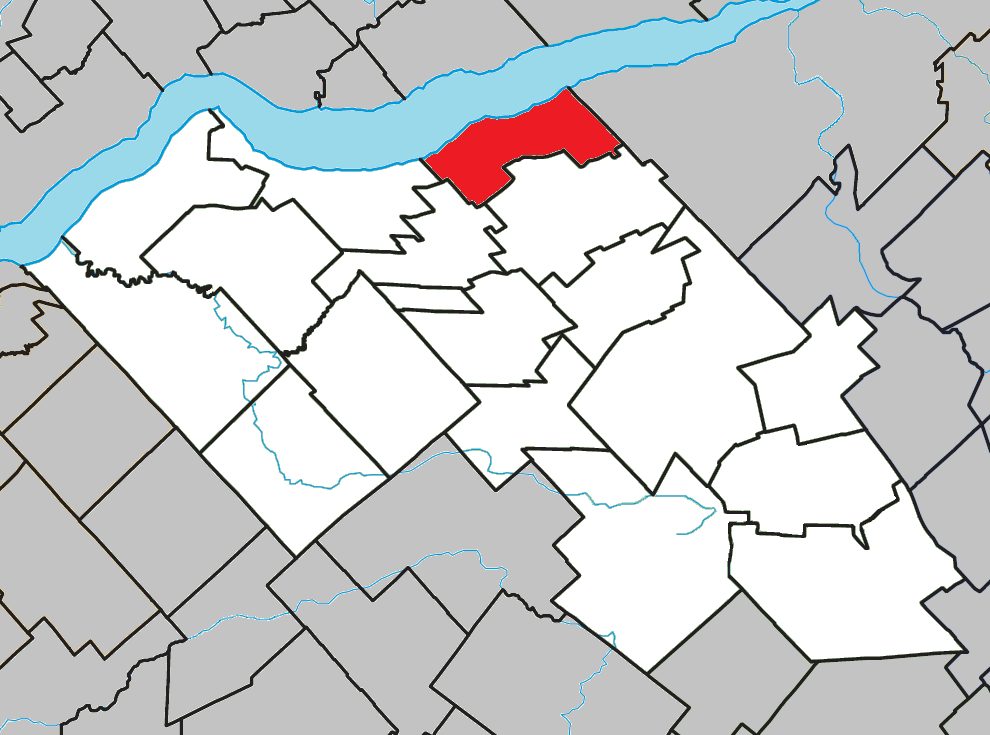
- Location within Lotbinière RCM.

- Location in southern Quebec.
- Coordinates: 46°40′N 71°35′W
- Country: Canada
- Province: Quebec
- Region: Chaudière-Appalaches
- RCM: Lotbinière
- Constituted: July 1, 1855

Government
  - Mayor: Myriam Lambert-Dumas
  - Federal riding: Lévis—Lotbinière
  - Prov. riding: Lotbinière-Frontenac

Area
  - Total: 59.60 km^{2} (23.01 sq mi)
  - Land: 59.95 km^{2} (23.15 sq mi)
- There is an apparent contradiction between two authoritative sources

Population (2021)
  - Total: 1,682
  - Density: 28.1/km^{2} (73/sq mi)
  - Pop 2016-2021: ▲5.3%
  - Dwellings: 853
- Time zone: UTC−5 (EST)
  - Summer (DST): UTC−4 (EDT)
- Postal code(s): G0S 2C0
- Area codes: 418 and 581
- Highways: R-132; R-273
- Website: www.saintantoine detilly.com

Saint-Antoine-de-Tilly (French pronunciation: [sɛ̃t‿ɑ̃twan də tiji]) is a municipality in the Lotbinière Regional County Municipality in Quebec, Canada. It is part of the Chaudière-Appalaches region and had a population is 1,682 as of 2021.

A member of the Most Beautiful Villages of Quebec, Saint-Antoine-de-Tilly has been colonized since the early beginnings of New France. The seigneurie of Villieu was sold in 1700 to Pierre-Noël Le Gardeur de Tilly and became the seigneurie of Tilly, which is still part of the municipality's name.

Saint-Antoine is named in honour of St. Anthony of Padua.

== History ==
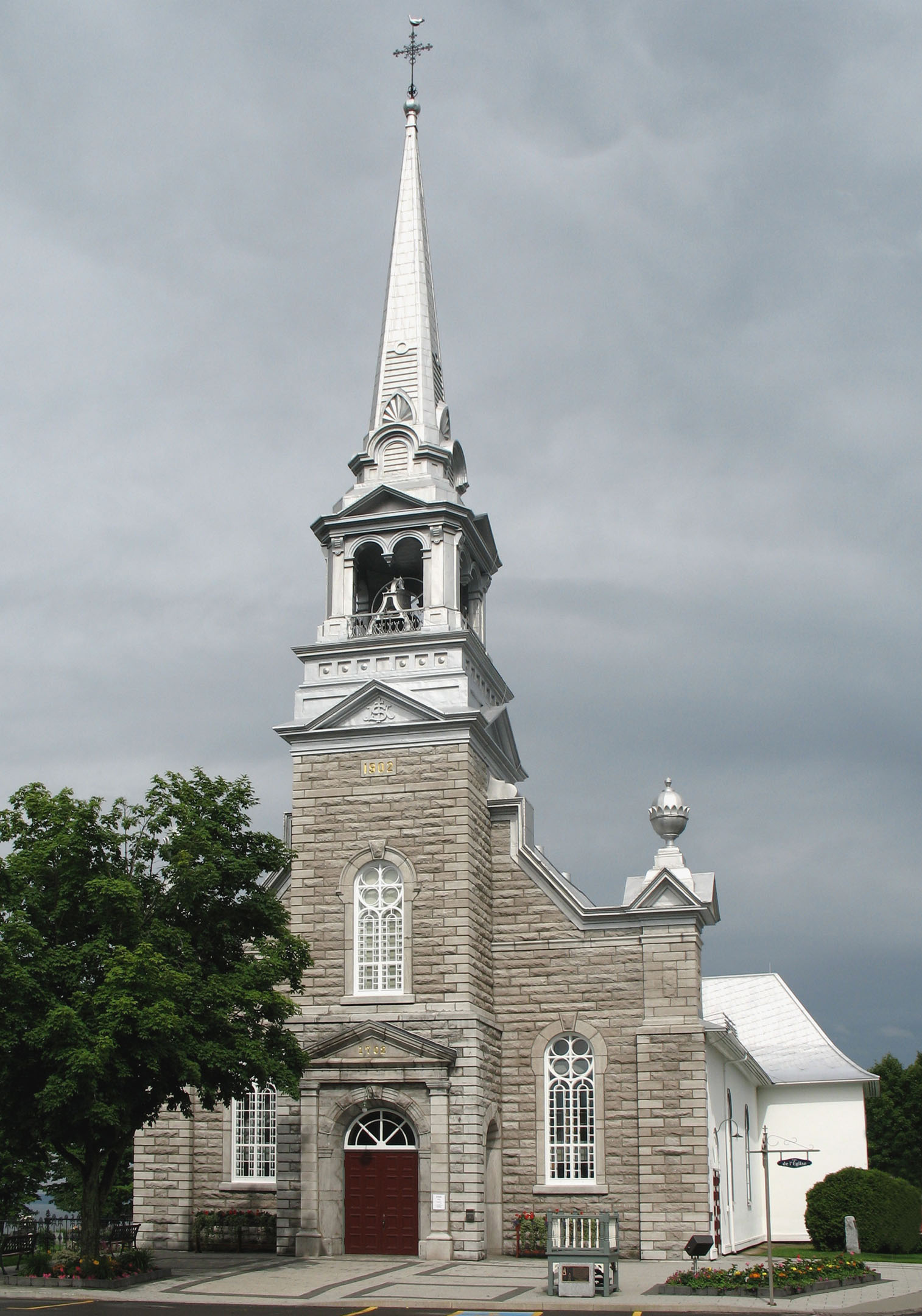
Saint-Antoine-de-Tilly church

In 1672, The territory of Saint-Antoine-de-Tilly was given to a lieutenant of the Carignan regiment, Claude-Sébastien de Villieu, by the intendant Jean Talon. Later, The territory was sold to Pierre-Noël Le Gardeur, sieur de Tilly. Under his ownership, in 1702, a parish was canonically erected and the territory took the name Saint-Antoine-de-Tilly. In 1759, the territory is the site of a battle during the conquest of New France.

The municipality was officially created in 1855. In 1909, it lost a small section of its territory for the creation of Notre-Dame-du-Sacré-Cœur-d’Issoudun. Finally, in 1995, the status of Saint-Antoine-de-Tilly was changed from a parish municipality to a regular municipality.

== Geography ==
The municipality is situated on the banks of the Estuary of St. Lawrence.
