= Moulin du Domaine =

Moulin du Domaine-de-Lotbinière
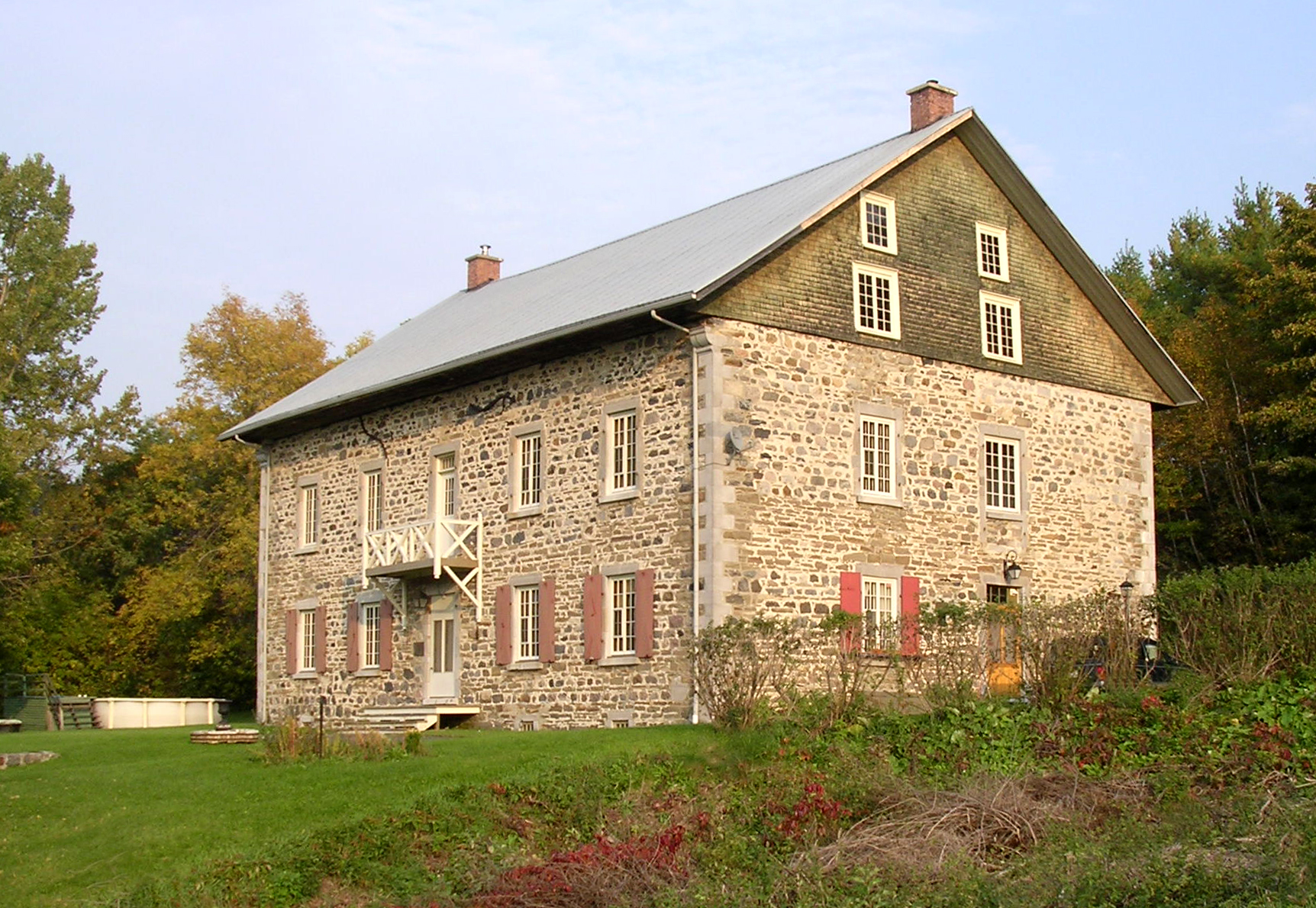

- Location within Quebec

General information
- Type: Water-powered grinding mill
- Classification: Heritage building (Immeuble patrimonial)
- Location: 7218, route Marie-Victorin, Lotbinière, Quebec, Canada
- Coordinates: 46.645816°N 71.892320°W
- Completed: 1799

Technical details
- Material: Stone masonry
- Floor count: 2 ½

The Moulin du Domaine-de-Lotbinière (Lotbinière Domain Mill) is a historical water-powered flour mill in the Chaudière-Appalaches region of the province of Quebec, Canada. It was built in 1799, and finally closed operations in 1942. It is classified as a heritage building, and is now a private residence.

== Location ==
The mill is in the Lotbinière municipality in the Chaudière-Appalaches administrative region of Quebec, on the Marie-Victorin road. It is surrounded by a large lot near the Saint Lawrence River. There is an associated archaeological site that is included in the inventory of archaeological sites in Quebec. Excavations in the grounds of the mill have shown there was human presence before the Europeans arrived. There are also remains of a church and a chapel. The mill was powered by the Ruisseau Saint-Eustache, which is also called Ruisseau du Domaine or Ruisseau du Moulin (Mill Stream). It is upstream from the Rivière-du-Moulin Ecological Reserve, which holds a forest that is locally known as the Bois du Domaine.

== Structure ==
The mill is a water-powered mill for grinding flour, built of stone masonry on stone foundations. It has a rectangular plan, with two full storeys and a half-storey below the sloping roof. The medium-pitched gable roof and symmetrically arranged windows and doors show a neoclassical influence. The rear of the mill is blank apart from a door. The other walls have casement windows with small glass panes. There is a door on the second floor leading to a balcony, which has a railing of Saint Andrew's crosses.

== History ==
In 1672 the intendant Jean Talon granted the seigneury of Lotbinière to René-Louis Chartier de Lotbinière (1641-1709). The seigneur reserved an estate for himself, as was normal at the time. A flour mill began operation on the Ruisseau Saint-Eustache in 1693. The mill was established in the area called Domaine-de-Lotbinière, the first nucleus of the seigneury. It was a "banal mill" (moulin banal), built to meet the seigneur's obligation to build a flour mill for the people of the seigneury. They had to have their grain ground there and had to pay a milling fee, the droit de banalité. In 1769 the seigneur built a new mill, and in 1799 this was replaced by the present Domaine-de-Lotbinière mill.

At the start of the 19th century the fourth seigneur of Lotbinière, Michel-Eustache-Gaspard-Alain Chartier de Lotbinière (1748-1822), noted that the supply of water to the mill decreased significantly each summer, reducing its productivity. After trying to remedy the problem, he had a second mill, the Moulin du Portage, built on the banks of the Chêne River, starting in 1815. The next year he closed the Moulin du Domain due to its lower capacity. The Moulin du Domaine was largely rebuilt and reopened in 1831 with new machinery for grinding flour and for treating fabrics. The mill remain in operation throughout the 19th century despite problems with the water supply, and was finally abandoned in 1942. On 30 September 1864 the Quebec Minister of Culture and Communications classified it as a heritage building (immeuble patrimonial).

In 1967 two history enthusiasts bought the building and converted it into a private residence. On 2 June 1977 the minister delimited the mill by a protected area. In 2014 the Ministry of Culture and Communications offered financial assistance of CDN$66,600 for a restoration project. The owner of the building was to pay the remainder of the estimated cost of $166,500. Major work was required to the building's structure, the masonry, the two chimneys and the roof.

== Sources ==
- "Le moulin du Portage", Journées des moulins (in French), Association des moulins du Québec
- Marc-André de Blois (19 February 2014), Maka Kotto annonce la restauration du moulin du Domaine-de-Lotbinière (in French), Ministre de la Culture et des Communications
- Moulin du Domaine-de-Lotbinière (in French), Gouvernement du Québec, 2013
- "Moulin du Domaine-de-Lotbinière", Canada's Historic Places (in French), Parks Canada
- "Restauration du moulin du Domaine-de-Lotbinière", Portail Constructo (in French), TC Media, 21 February 2014
- Rivière-du-Moulin, Réserve écologique de la (in French), MRC Lotbinière
