= Lotbinière, Quebec =

Lotbinière
- Municipality
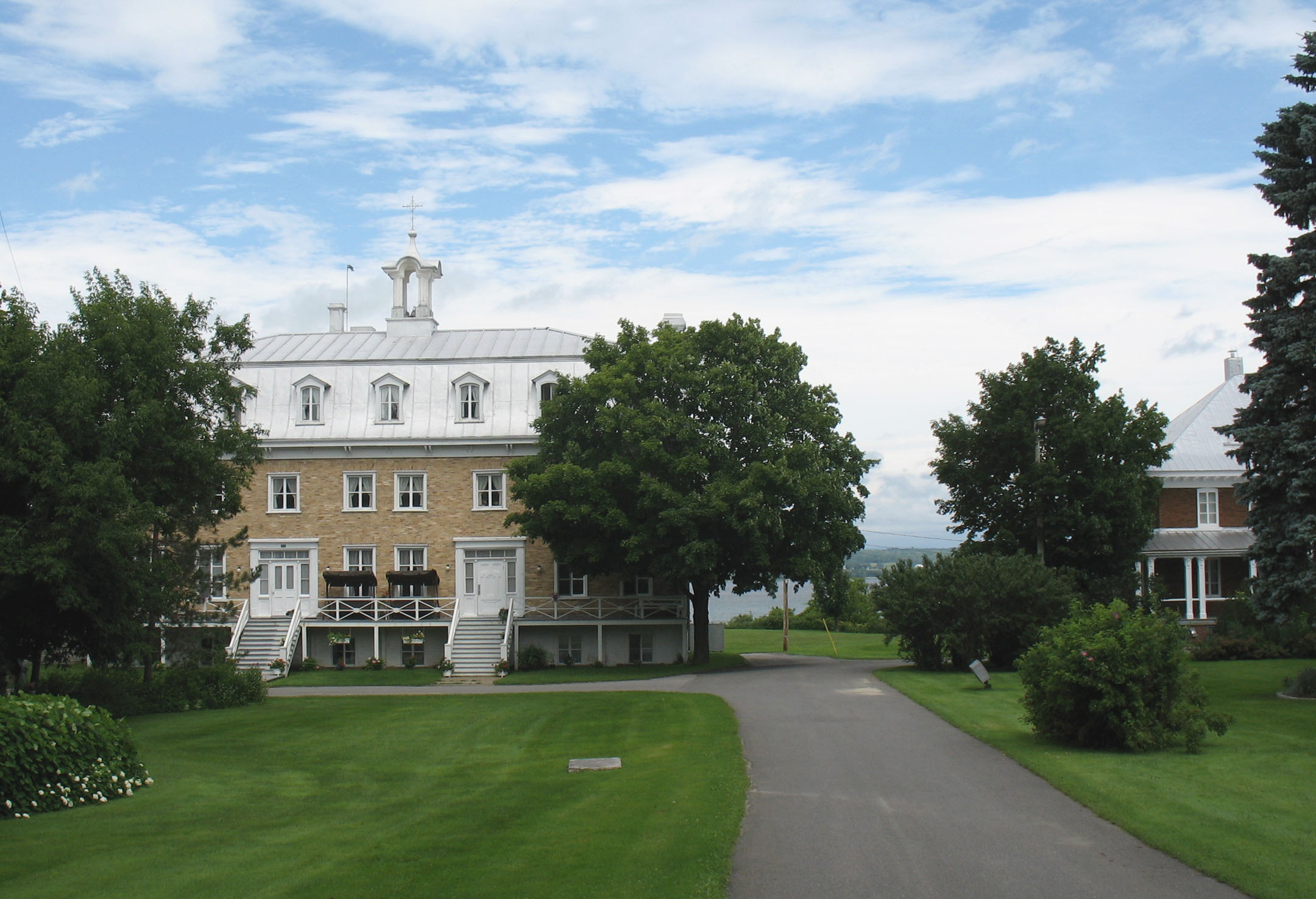

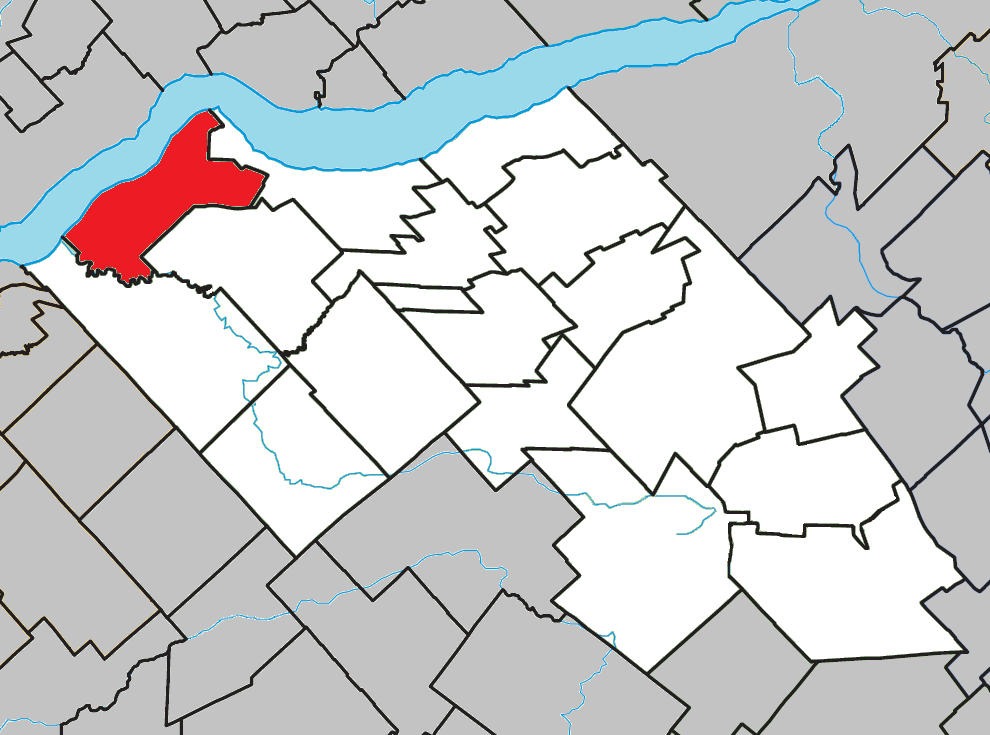
- Location within Lotbinière RCM

- Location in southern Quebec
- Coordinates: 46°37′N 71°56′W
- Country: Canada
- Province: Quebec
- Region: Chaudière-Appalaches
- RCM: Lotbinière
- Constituted: January 1, 1979

Government
  - Mayor: Thierry Bélanger
  - Federal riding: Mégantic—L'Érable—Lotbinière
  - Prov. riding: Lotbinière-Frontenac

Area
  - Total: 100.00 km^{2} (38.61 sq mi)
  - Land: 79.91 km^{2} (30.85 sq mi)

Population (2021)
  - Total: 855
  - Density: 10.7/km^{2} (28/sq mi)
  - Pop 2016–2021: ▲5.3%
  - Dwellings: 562
- Time zone: UTC−5 (EST)
  - Summer (DST): UTC−4 (EDT)
- Postal code(s): G0S 1S0
- Area codes: 418 and 581
- Highways: R-132
- Website: www.municipalite-lotbiniere.com

Lotbinière (French pronunciation: [lɔtbinjɛʁ]) is a municipality in Lotbinière Regional County Municipality in Quebec, Canada. It is part of the Chaudière-Appalaches region and the population was 855 as of the Canada 2021 Census. It is named after the seigneurie of which it was part. Bordered in the northwest by the Saint Lawrence River, Lotbinière is part of the Most Beautiful Villages of Quebec network.

== History ==
It was constituted in 1979 from the amalgamation of the parish of Saint-Louis-de-Lotbinière and the village of Lotbinière. The area was initially settled by French colonizers at the end of the 17th century. It is named after René-Louis Chartier de Lotbinière, who was granted the seigneury of Lotbinière in 1672.

== Attractions ==
- Moulin du Domaine, historical water-powered flour mill
- Moulin du Portage, historical water-powered flour mill
- Saint Lawrence River HVDC Powerline Crossing
