= Cliche River =

River in Chaudière-Appalaches, Quebec, Canada

- Location within Quebec
- Native name: Rivière Cliche (French)

Location
- Country: Canada
- Province: Quebec
- Administrative region: Chaudière-Appalaches
- RCM: Robert-Cliche Regional County Municipality, La Nouvelle-Beauce Regional County Municipality

Physical characteristics
- Source: Forested streams
  - location: La Guadeloupe
  - coordinates: 46.315353°N 71.009616°W
  - elevation: 497 metres (1,631 ft)
- Mouth: Chaudière River
  - location: Saint-Joseph-des-Érables
  - coordinates: 46.33916°N 70.925°W
  - elevation: 139 metres (456 ft)
- Length: 8.4 kilometres (5.2 mi)

Basin features
- Progression: Chaudière River, St. Lawrence
- Tributaries
  - left: (upstream)
  - right: (upstream)

The Cliche River (in French: rivière Cliche) is a tributary of the west bank of the Chaudière River which flows northwards to empty onto the south bank of the St. Lawrence River. It flows in the municipalities of Saint-Frédéric (MRC Robert-Cliche Regional County Municipality) and Saint-Joseph-des-Érables, in the La Nouvelle-Beauce Regional County Municipality, in the administrative region of Chaudière-Appalaches, in Quebec, in Canada.

== Geography ==
The main neighboring watersheds of the Cliche river are:

- north side: Lessard River, Nadeau River, Savoie River, Chaudière River;
- east side: Chaudière River;
- south side: Castors stream, Ormes stream, rivière des Fermes, Cinque River;
- west side: Lessard River.

The Cliche river takes its source on the eastern slope of a mountain located in the northwestern part of the municipality of Saint-Frédéric. This head area is located 3.1 kilometres (1.9 mi) north-west of the village center of Saint-Frédéric, at 4.6 kilometres (2.9 mi) north of the village center of Tring-Jonction, at 3.3 kilometres (2.1 mi) east of the center of the village of Saint-Séverin and at 6.4 kilometres (4.0 mi) west of the Chaudière River.

From its source, the Cliche river flows over 8.4 kilometres (5.2 mi) divided into the following segments:

- 0.7 kilometres (0.43 mi) southeasterly, in the municipality of Saint-Frédéric, to rang Saint-Narcisse road;
- 1.2 kilometres (0.75 mi) southeasterly, to rang Saint-Pierre road;
- 2.6 kilometres (1.6 mi) northeasterly, to route 112;
- 2.1 kilometres (1.3 mi) northeasterly, to the limit of the municipality of Saint-Joseph-des-Érables, Quebec|Saint-Joseph-des-Érables;
- 1.8 kilometres (1.1 mi) eastward, up to its confluence.

The Cliche river empties on the west bank of the Chaudière River, in Saint-Joseph-des-Érables. This confluence is located 3.8 kilometres (2.4 mi) upstream of the bridge in the village of Vallée-Jonction and at 4.3 kilometres (2.7 mi) downstream of the Saint-Joseph-de-Beauce.

== Toponymy ==
The toponym Rivière Cliche was formalized on August 28, 1980, at the Commission de toponymie du Québec.

== See also ==
- List of rivers of Quebec
