= Rivière des Fermes =

River in Chaudière-Appalaches, Quebec (Canada)

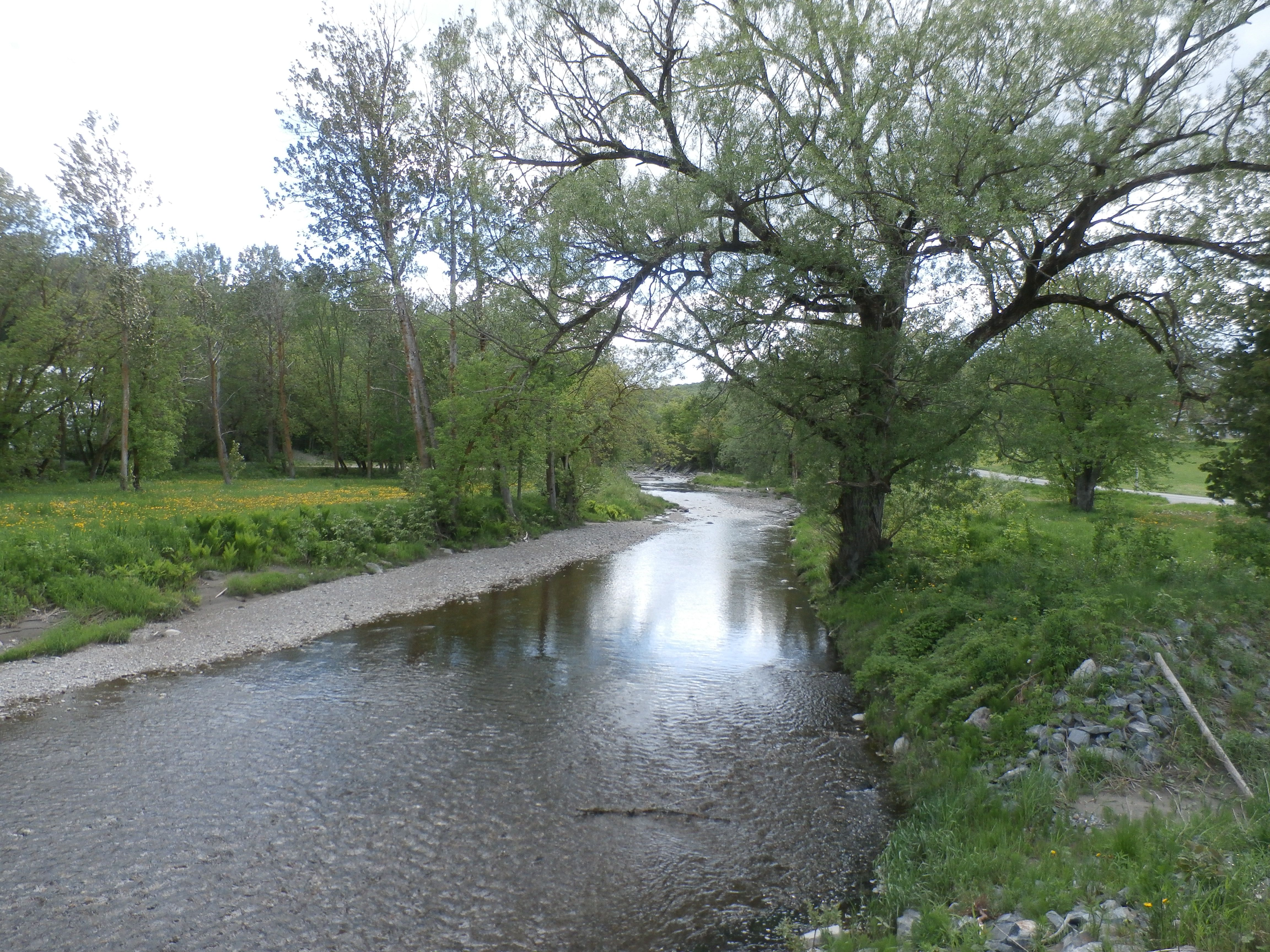
- Rivière des Fermes seen from Rang des Érables.

- Location within Quebec

Location
- Country: Canada
- Province: Quebec
- Administrative region: Chaudière-Appalaches
- RCM: Robert-Cliche Regional County Municipality, La Nouvelle-Beauce Regional County Municipality

Physical characteristics
- Source: Mountain and forested streams
  - location: Saint-Frédéric
  - coordinates: 46.254815°N 71.011731°W
  - elevation: 309 metres (1,014 ft)
- Mouth: Chaudière River
  - location: Saint-Joseph-des-Érables
  - coordinates: 46.31278°N 70.89111°W
  - elevation: 140 metres (460 ft)
- Length: 18.8 kilometres (11.7 mi)

Basin features
- Progression: Chaudière River, St. Lawrence
- Tributaries
  - left: (upstream) ruisseau Bas Saint-Antoine, ruisseau Saint-Pierre, rivière à Charles-Henri.
  - right: (upstream) ruisseau Tête de Rouche, ruisseau Marachois, ruisseau Lessard, ruisseau Labbé, cours d'eau Cloutier.

The rivière des Fermes (in English: Ladies River) is a tributary of the west bank of the Chaudière River which flows northward to empty onto the south bank of the St. Lawrence River. It flows in the administrative region of Chaudière-Appalaches, in Quebec, in Canada, in the Robert-Cliche Regional County Municipality (municipalities of Saint-Frédéric and Tring-Jonction) and La Nouvelle-Beauce Regional County Municipality (municipality of Saint-Joseph-des-Érables).

== Geography ==
The main neighboring watersheds of the Fermes river are:

- north side: Cliche River, Lessard River, Nadeau River, Chaudière River;
- east side: Chaudière River;
- south side: Bras Saint-Victor, Castors stream, rivière du Cinq;
- west side: rivière du Cinq, Palmer East River.

The "Farms River" has its source in the mountainous area in the township of Broughton. This head area is located at the municipal boundary between Saint-Séverin and Saint-Frédéric, at 5.1 kilometres (3.2 mi) to the north-west from the village of Tring-Jonction, at 3.8 kilometres (2.4 mi) south-west of the village of Saint-Séverin, at 6.6 kilometres (4.1 mi) north of the village of East-Broughton and 11.0 kilometres (6.8 mi) west of the Chaudière River.

From its source, the Fermes river flows over 18.8 kilometres (11.7 mi) divided into the following segments:

- 5.5 kilometres (3.4 mi) southeasterly, in the municipality of Saint-Frédéric, to the limit of the municipality of Tring-Jonction;
- 1.8 kilometres (1.1 mi) towards the south-east, crossing the village of Tring-Jonction, to the confluence of the Labbé stream (coming from the south-west);
- 2.9 kilometres (1.8 mi) eastward, up to the limit of Saint-Frédéric;
- 2.1 kilometres (1.3 mi) northeasterly, to route 276;
- 1.4 kilometres (0.87 mi) southeasterly, to the limit of the municipality of Saint-Joseph-des-Érables;
- 1.4 kilometres (0.87 mi) eastward, again crossing route 276 and crossing the "Louisette waterfall", to the confluence of the Marachois stream (coming from the southwest);
- 2.7 kilometres (1.7 mi) north-east, to the road along the Chaudière River on the west bank;
- 1.0 kilometre (0.62 mi) eastward, up to its confluence.

The Fermes river empties on the west bank of the Chaudière River, in Saint-Joseph-des-Érables. This confluence is located opposite the northern part of the village of Saint-Joseph-de-Beauce and upstream from the bridge in the village of Vallée-Jonction.

== Toponymy ==
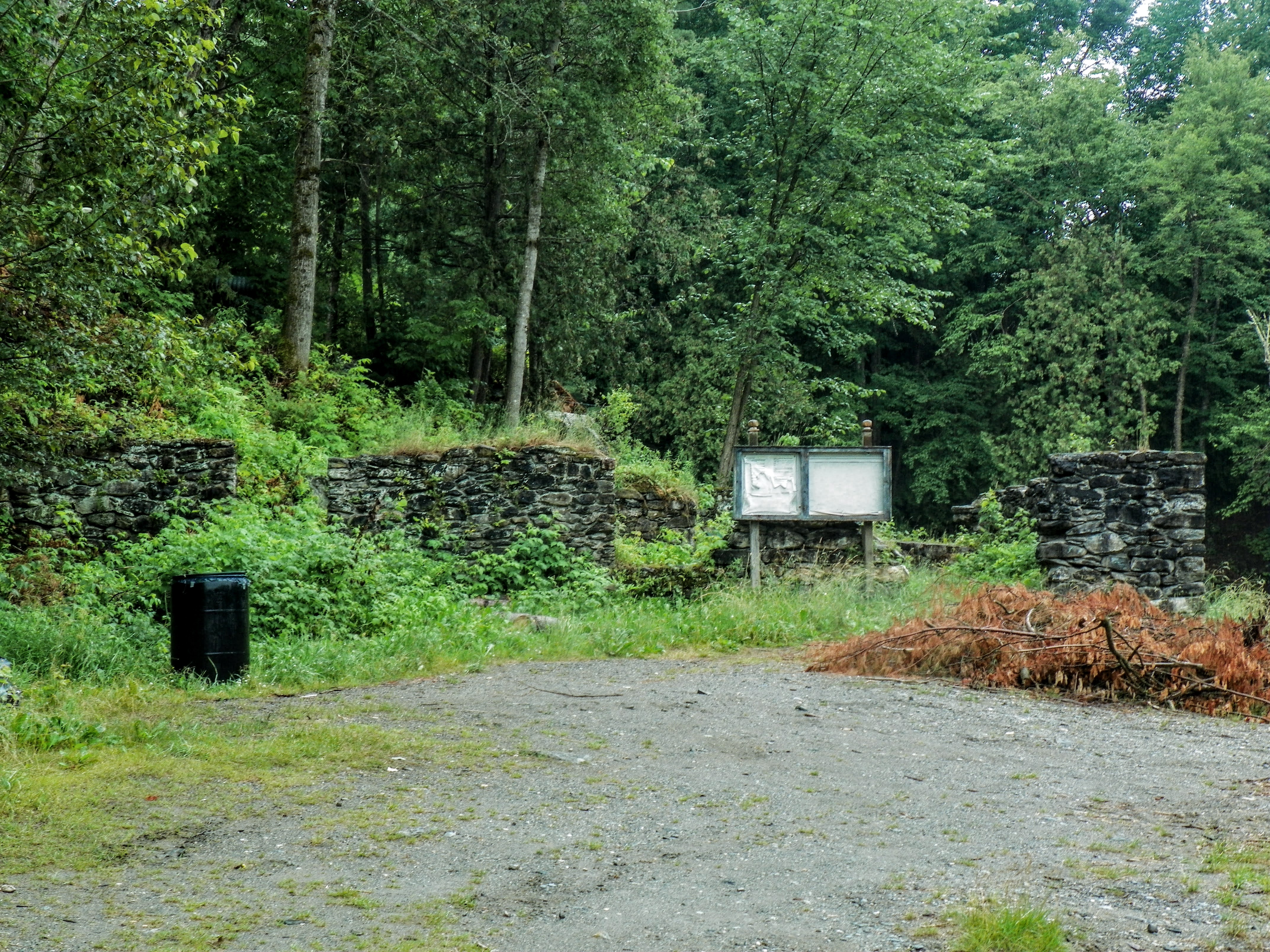
Site of the old seigneurial mill.

About a kilometer from its confluence, the course of the river crosses some important rapids. A mill had been erected at this place Lord Joseph de Fleury de La Gorgendière; the latter did not live in his seigneury of Beauce, preferring to live in his manor of Deschambault. All around is the site of the "Grandes Fermes", the local appellation attributed to the whole of the lord's own domain.

A farm road, extended by a Saint-Louis range to the limits of the seigneury, climbs the hill and allows you to reach the site of the waterfall and the foundations of the seigneurial mill. The latter was demolished in 1962. Then a campground was built on the site. The toponym "Rivière des Fermes" is often attested in documents since the end of 18th century and, on maps, at least since 1878.

The toponym "rivière des Fermes" was made official on December 5, 1968, at the Commission de toponymie du Québec.

== See also ==
- List of rivers of Quebec
