= Lessard River (Chaudière River tributary) =

River in Chaudière-Appalaches, Quebec (Canada)

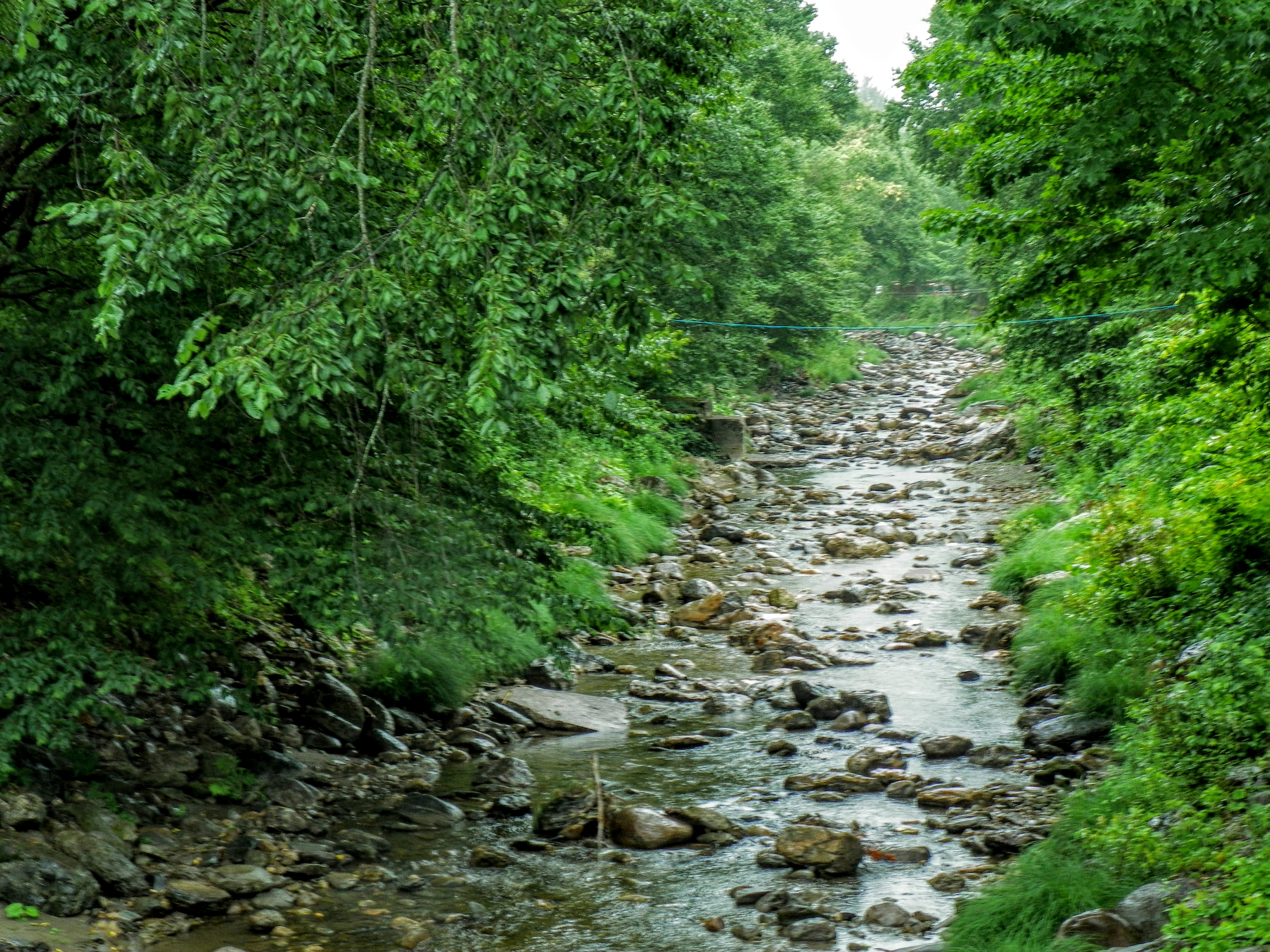
- Lessard River at Vallée-Jonction.

- Location within Quebec
- Native name: Rivière Lessard (French)

Location
- Country: Canada
- Province: Quebec
- Administrative region: Chaudière-Appalaches
- RCM: Robert-Cliche Regional County Municipality, La Nouvelle-Beauce Regional County Municipality

Physical characteristics
- Source: Mountain and agricultural streams
  - location: Saint-Séverin
  - coordinates: 46.304347°N 71.05734°W
  - elevation: 593 metres (1,946 ft)
- Mouth: Chaudière River
  - location: Vallée-Jonction
  - coordinates: 46.38528°N 70.95139°W
  - elevation: 139 metres (456 ft)
- Length: 14.4 kilometres (8.9 mi)

Basin features
- Progression: Chaudière River, St. Lawrence
- Tributaries
  - left: (upstream)
  - right: (upstream)

The Lessard River (French: rivière Lessard, pronounced [ʁivjɛʁ lɛsaʁ]) is a tributary of the west bank of the Chaudière River which flows northwards to empty onto the south bank of the St. Lawrence River. It flows in the municipalities of Saint-Séverin (MRC of Robert-Cliche Regional County Municipality) and Vallée-Jonction (MRC of La Nouvelle-Beauce Regional County Municipality), in the administrative region of Chaudière-Appalaches, in Quebec, in Canada.

== Geography ==
The main neighboring watersheds of the Lessard River are:

- north side: Nadeau River, Savoie River, Chaudière River;
- east side: Chaudière River;
- south side: Cliche River, stream of Castors, stream of Ormes, rivière des Fermes, river of Cinq;
- west side: Troisième Rang stream, Filkars River, Palmer East River.

The Lessard River has its source on the northern slope of a mountain located in the southwest part of the municipality of Saint-Séverin. This head area is located 5.9 kilometres (3.7 mi) north-west of the center of the village of Saint-Frédéric, at 5.6 kilometres (3.5 mi) north-west of the center of the village of Tring-Jonction, at 2.2 kilometres (1.4 mi) east of the village center of Saint-Séverin and at 10.4 kilometres (6.5 mi) west of the Chaudière River.

From its source, the Lessard River flows almost to the limit of the former Sainte-Marie seigneury, over 14.4 kilometres (8.9 mi) divided into the following segments:

- 2.6 kilometres (1.6 mi) north, then east, in the municipality of Saint-Séverin, up to Chemin du Premier rang;
- 4.9 kilometres (3.0 mi) north-east, up to rang Saint-Olivier road;
- 2.0 kilometres (1.2 mi) northeasterly, up to rang Saint-Jacques road;
- 1.9 kilometres (1.2 mi) northeasterly, to the limit of the municipality of Saint-Joseph-des-Érables;
- 3.0 kilometres (1.9 mi) eastward, up to its confluence.

The "Chute à Corinne" is located about three kilometers upstream from its confluence; then the river flows in a narrow valley between hills made of finiglacial materials, characterizing this part of Beauce. Several gravel and sand quarries exploit this natural resource.

The Lessard river empties on the west bank of the Chaudière River, in Saint-Joseph-des-Érables. This confluence is located 2.1 kilometres (1.3 mi) downstream from the bridge in the village of Vallée-Jonction and at 8.1 kilometres (5.0 mi) upstream from the Sainte-Marie-de-Beauce.

== Toponymy ==
This watercourse was initially designated "Rivière du Tabord" according to a document of 1785, an enigmatic designation which perhaps recalls mount Tabor or Tabor, mountain of Lower Galilee where the transfiguration of Christ took place.

The current name evokes the Lessard families who were numerous to own lots of land near this watercourse. As early as 1819, the two lords Taschereau, Sainte-Marie and de Jolliet, built a flour mill on the land of François Lessard. Subsequently, this toponym is constantly in use in documents and on maps of this sector.

The toponym "rivière Lessard" was made official on December 5, 1968, at the Commission de toponymie du Québec.

== See also ==
- List of rivers of Quebec
