= Nadeau River =

River in Chaudière-Appalaches, Quebec (Canada)

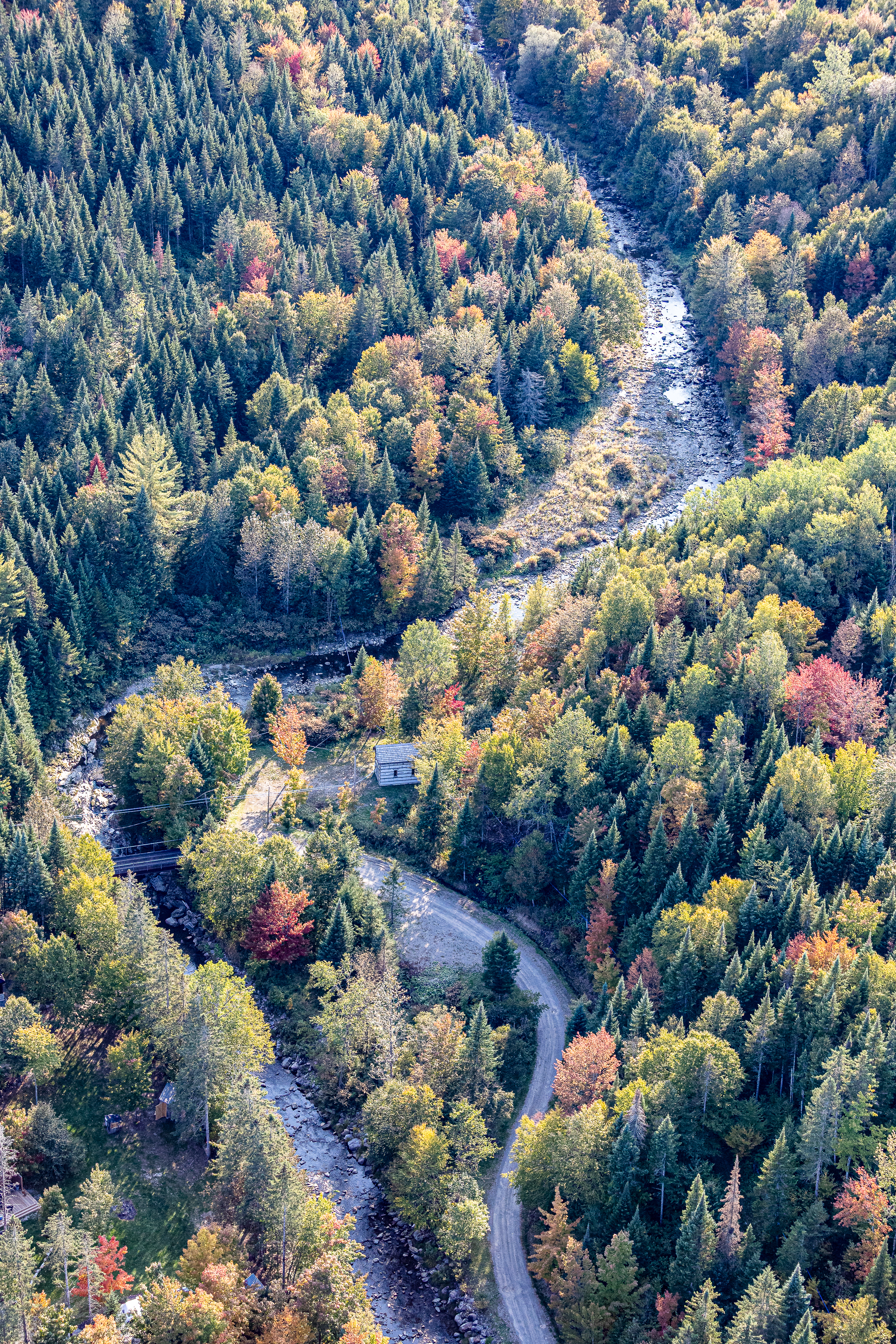

- Location within Quebec
- Native name: Rivière Nadeau (French)

Location
- Country: Canada
- Province: Quebec
- Administrative region: Chaudière-Appalaches
- RCM: Robert-Cliche Regional County Municipality, La Nouvelle-Beauce Regional County Municipality

Physical characteristics
- Source: Mountain and agricultural streams
  - location: Saint-Séverin
  - coordinates: 46.326753°N 71.078963°W
  - elevation: 139 metres (456 ft)
- Mouth: Chaudière River
  - location: Vallée-Jonction
  - coordinates: 46.38556°N 70.95167°W
  - elevation: 139 metres (456 ft)
- Length: 15.0 kilometres (9.3 mi)

Basin features
- Progression: Chaudière River, St. Lawrence
- Tributaries
  - left: (upstream) ruisseau Guay
  - right: (upstream)

The Nadeau River (in French: rivière Nadeau) is a tributary of the west bank of the Chaudière River which flows northward to empty onto the south bank of the St. Lawrence River. It flows in the administrative region of Chaudière-Appalaches, in Quebec, in Canada, in the Robert-Cliche Regional County Municipality (in the municipality of Saint-Séverin) and La Nouvelle-Beauce Regional County Municipality (in the municipalities of Saint-Elzéar, of Sainte-Marie-de-Beauce, of Vallée-Jonction).

== Geography ==
The main neighboring watersheds of the Nadeau River are:

- north side: Savoie River, Vallée River, Chaudière River;
- east side: Chaudière River;
- south side: Lessard River, Cliche River, rivière des Fermes, Cinq River;
- west side: Aulnaies stream, Beaurivage River, Fourchette River, Filkars River, Palmer East River.

The Nadeau river has its source in the northern part of the municipality of Saint-Séverin, at 8.1 kilometres (5.0 mi) north-west of the center of the village of Tring-Jonction, at 1.4 kilometres (0.87 mi) north-west of the center of the village of Saint-Séverin and at 10.7 kilometres (6.6 mi) west of the Chaudière River.

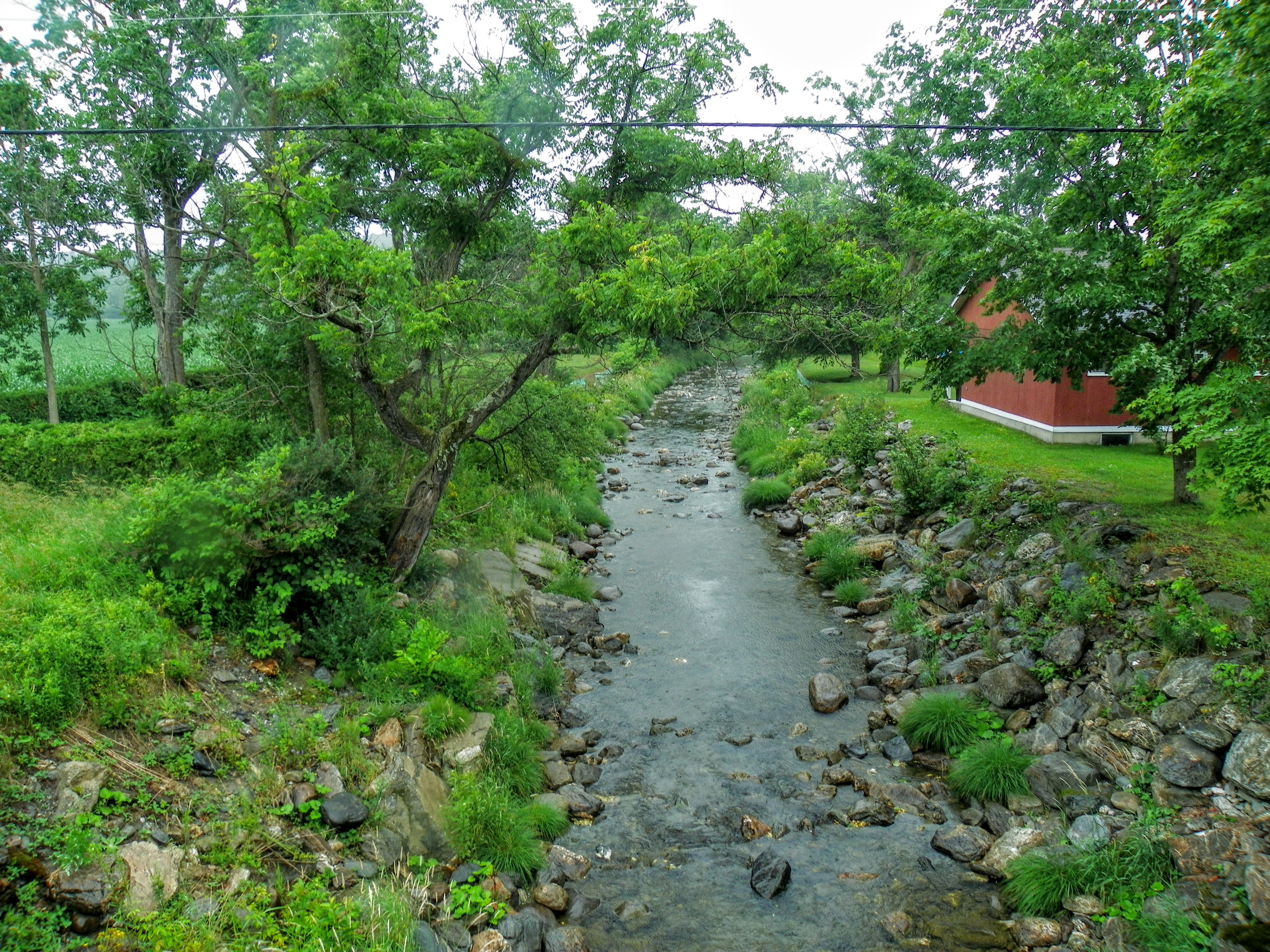
The river near its mouth.

From its source, the Nadeau River flows over 15.0 kilometres (9.3 mi) divided into the following segments:

- 4.6 kilometres (2.9 mi) north-east, in the municipality of Saint-Séverin, to a country road which delimits Saint-Séverin and Saint-Elzéar;
- 2.1 kilometres (1.3 mi) northeasterly, to rang Saint-Olivier road;
- 2.1 kilometres (1.3 mi) north-east, collecting the water from the Guay stream (coming from the north-west), to the chemin du rang Saint-Jacques;
- 2.4 kilometres (1.5 mi) north-east, to a country road delimiting the municipalities of Saint-Elzéar and Sainte-Marie-de-Beauce;
- 2.9 kilometres (1.8 mi) eastward, up to the limit of Vallée-Jonction;
- 0.9 kilometres (0.56 mi) eastward, up to its confluence.

The Nadeau river empties on the west bank of the Chaudière River, in Vallée-Jonction. This confluence is located 2.1 kilometres (1.3 mi) downstream of the bridge in the village of Vallée-Jonction, at 8.1 kilometres (5.0 mi) upstream of the Sainte-Marie-de-Beauce and at 4.9 kilometres (3.0 mi) upstream from the confluence of the Savoie River.

== Toponymy ==
The toponym Rivière Nadeau was formalized on December 5, 1968, at the Commission de toponymie du Québec.

== See also ==
- List of rivers of Quebec
