= Savoie River =

River in Chaudière-Appalaches, Quebec (Canada)

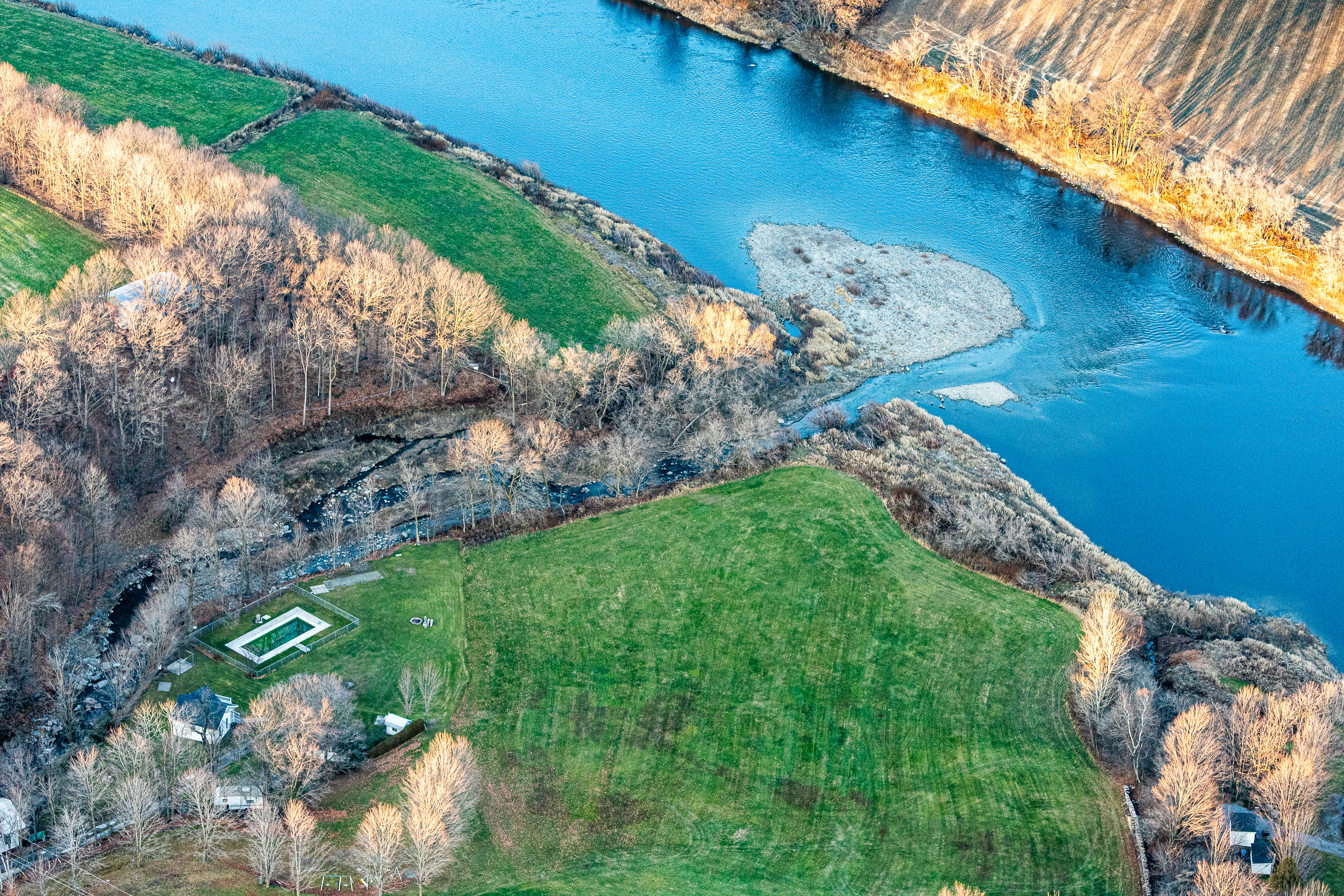

- Location within Quebec
- Native name: Rivière Savoie (French)

Location
- Country: Canada
- Province: Quebec
- Administrative region: Chaudière-Appalaches
- RCM: La Nouvelle-Beauce Regional County Municipality

Physical characteristics
- Source: Mountain and agricultural streams
  - location: Saint-Elzéar
  - coordinates: 46.393586°N 71.079883°W
  - elevation: 290 metres (950 ft)
- Mouth: Chaudière River
  - location: Saint-Marie-de-Beauce
  - coordinates: 46.41444°N 71.00195°W
  - elevation: 147 metres (482 ft)
- Length: 7.2 kilometres (4.5 mi)

Basin features
- Progression: Chaudière River, St. Lawrence
- Tributaries
  - left: (upstream)
  - right: (upstream)

The Savoy River (in French: rivière Savoy) is a tributary of the west bank of the Chaudière River which flows north to empty onto the south bank of the Saint Lawrence River. It flows in the municipalities of Saint-Elzéar and Sainte-Marie-de-Beauce, in the La Nouvelle-Beauce Regional County Municipality, in the administrative region of Chaudière-Appalaches, in Quebec, in Canada.

== Geography ==
The main neighboring watersheds of the Savoie river are:

- north side: Vallée River, rivière des Îles Brûlées, Chaudière River;
- east side: Chaudière River;
- south side: Nadeau River, Lessard River, Cliche River, rivière des Fermes;
- west side: Aulnaies stream, Beaurivage River, Fourchette River, Filkars River.

The Savoie river has its source in the Haut-Saint-Olivier range, in the municipality of Saint-Elzéar, on the north slope of Mont du Cosmos. This head zone is located 2.0 kilometres (1.2 mi) southwest of the center of the village of Saint-Elzéar, at 5.5 kilometres (3.4 mi) west of the Chaudière River and 3.8 kilometres (2.4 mi) north of the summit of Mont Saint-André.

From its source (i.e. at the level of the Haut-Saint-Olivier road), the Savoie river flows on 7.2 kilometres (4.5 mi) divided into the following segments:

- 1.8 kilometres (1.1 mi) north-east, in the municipality of Saint-Elzéar, to a road on Rang Haut-Saint-Jacques, which it cuts at 0.6 kilometres (0.37 mi) south of the village center;
- 1.6 kilometres (0.99 mi) north-east, up to Chemin du Haut-Saint-Thomas, which marks out the municipalities of Saint-Elzéar and Sainte-Marie-de-Beauce;
- 3.8 kilometres (2.4 mi) northeasterly, crossing the rang Saint-Étienne-Sud road (which runs along the east bank of the Chaudière River), to its confluence.

The Savoie river empties on the west bank of the Chaudière River, in Sainte-Marie-de-Beauce. This confluence is located 4.9 kilometres (3.0 mi) downstream from the confluence of the Nadeau River and Lessard River, as well as at 2.6 kilometres (1.6 mi) upstream of the Sainte-Marie-de-Beauce bridge.

== Toponymy ==
The toponym Rivière Savoie was formalized on October 6, 1983, at the Commission de toponymie du Québec.

== See also ==
- List of rivers of Quebec
