= Scott's Bridge =

Demolished bridge in Lincoln, England

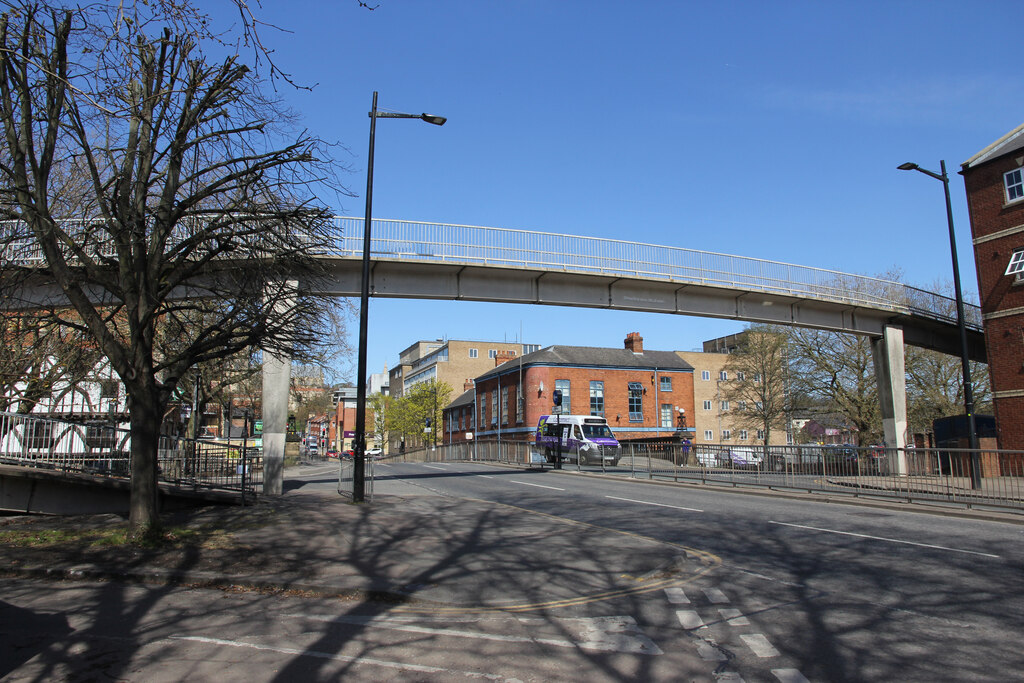
- Scott's Bridge in April 2025, shortly before demolition
- Carried: Pedestrians and cyclists
- Crossed: Melville Street (A15)
- Locale: Lincoln, Lincolnshire, England
- Owner: Lincolnshire County Council

Characteristics
- Design: Ramped switchback pedestrian bridge
- Material: Reinforced concrete

History
- Construction end: c. 1971–1974
- Closed: 5 May 2025
- Demolished: 16–19 May 2025

Scott's Bridge was a concrete pedestrian bridge in Lincoln, England. It carried a footpath over Melville Street (part of the A15) near the River Witham, connecting Waterside South with the city centre. It was part of National Cycle Route 64 and provided an accessible crossing via a ramped switchback design. The bridge was demolished in May 2025 as part of a redevelopment scheme.

== History ==
The bridge was constructed to provide a pedestrian and cycle crossing of Melville Street, linking the city centre with the southern districts of Lincoln. Its exact construction date is unclear: while one source described it as "built in 1974", an image published by the Society for Lincolnshire History and Archaeology shows it already in place by 1971.

The bridge became a familiar feature in local photography. A 2025 BBC report noted that residents recalled using it for cathedral views "as far back as the 1960s". Throughout its life it was maintained by Lincolnshire County Council.

== Design ==
Scott's Bridge was built of reinforced concrete with a ramped switchback design that provided step-free access across the A15. Handrails were provided along all ramps and landings. The crossing also supported cycling in the city and lay on the corridor of National Cycle Route 64.

== Demolition ==
In 2025, plans were approved to redevelop the site of the adjacent vacant Lincoln Co-operative shopping centre into a six-storey hotel and residential development.

Planning documents from Lincolnshire County Council noted that all existing structures within the site curtilage, including the pedestrian bridge, would be removed. The redevelopment included a new one-way service street and direct links into the Lincoln Central multi-storey car park.

Scott's Bridge was closed to the public from 5 May 2025 and demolished between 16 and 19 May. The works required temporary road closures of Broadgate and Lindum Hill and diversions for several bus services operated by Stagecoach East Midlands.

According to developers, the demolition produced approximately 8,100 tonnes of concrete and brick rubble and 350 tonnes of metals, of which more than 99% was recycled for use in local road and infrastructure projects.

=== Public reception ===
Coverage in local and regional media reported mixed views regarding the bridge's removal. According to Lincolnshire Live, some residents described it as "ugly" and compared it to "stark governmental buildings". Others characterised it as a local landmark and valued the elevated views of Lincoln Cathedral.

== Mitigation and future plans ==
The council stated that maintaining east-west connectivity across Melville Street, which forms part of NCN Route 64, remained important. As part of the planning approval, the council secured a £500,000 Section 106 contribution to improve walking and cycling infrastructure in the city. Proposed measures included upgrades to nearby signalised crossings at St Swithin's Square and Newton Street, as well as longer-term improvements under the Broadgate Corridor regeneration scheme.
