= Saint-Joseph-des-Érables =

- Municipality
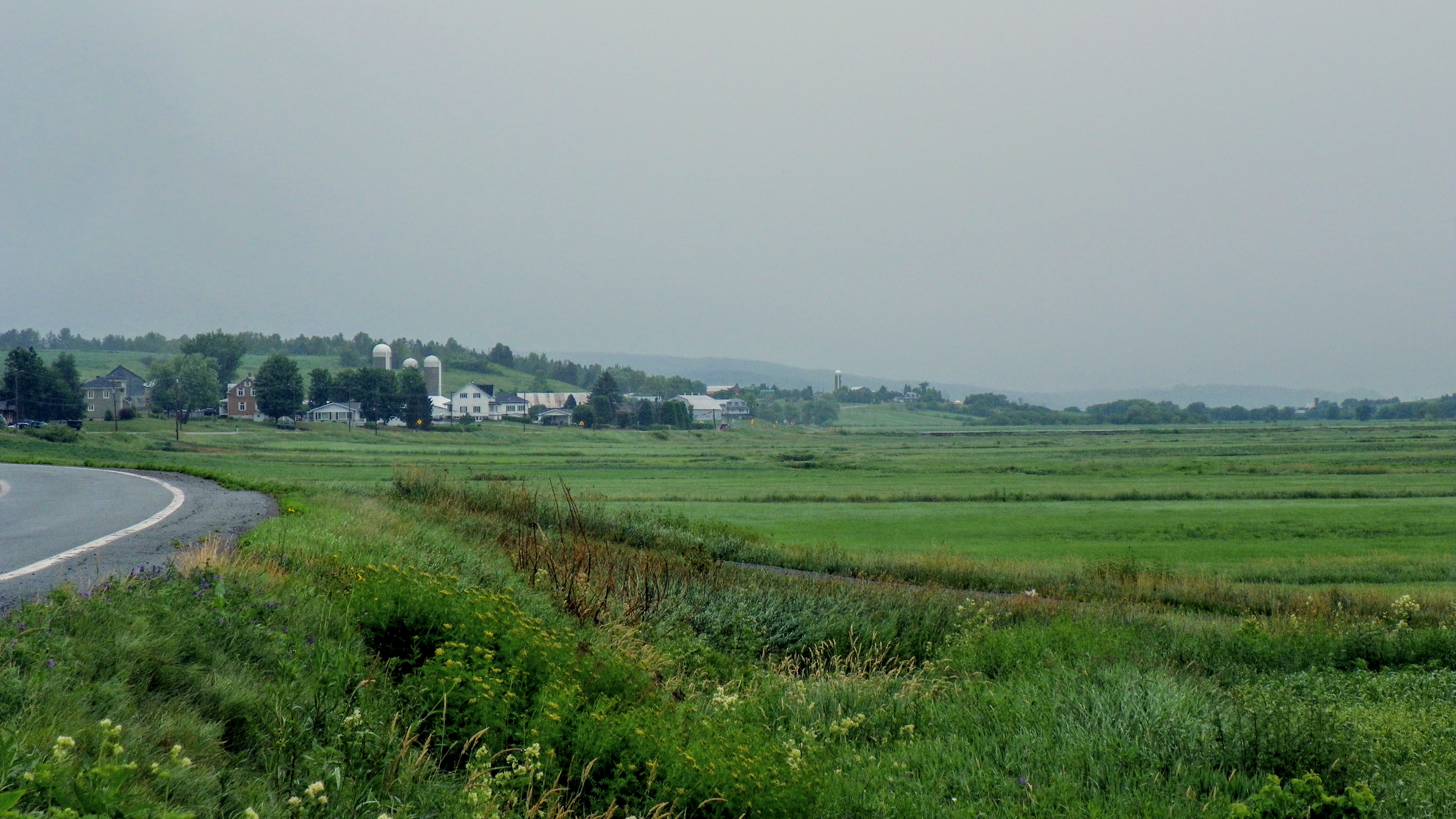
- Farms in the Chaudière valley.

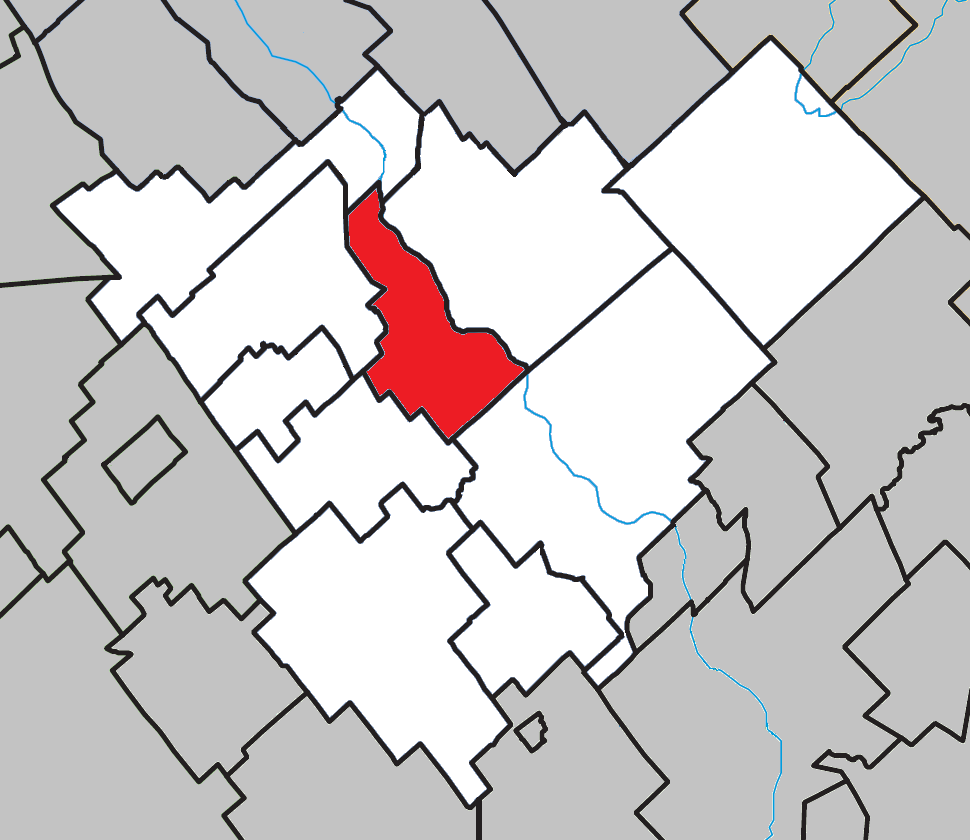
- Location within Beauce-Centre RCM.

- Location in southern Quebec.
- Coordinates: 46°17′N 70°55′W
- Country: Canada
- Province: Quebec
- Region: Chaudière-Appalaches
- RCM: Beauce-Centre
- Constituted: November 26, 1938

Government
  - Mayor: Jeannot Roy
  - Federal riding: Beauce
  - Prov. riding: Beauce-Nord

Area
  - Total: 52.40 km^{2} (20.23 sq mi)
  - Land: 51.43 km^{2} (19.86 sq mi)

Population (2021)
  - Total: 377
  - Density: 7.3/km^{2} (19/sq mi)
  - Pop 2016-2021: ▼8%
  - Dwellings: 154
- Time zone: UTC−5 (EST)
  - Summer (DST): UTC−4 (EDT)
- Postal code(s): G0S 2V0
- Area codes: 418 and 581
- Highways: R-276
- Website: www.stjoseph deserables.com

Saint-Joseph-des-Érables (French pronunciation: [sɛ̃ ʒozɛf dez‿eʁabl]) is a municipality in the Municipalité régionale de comté Beauce-Centre in Quebec, Canada. It is part of the Chaudière-Appalaches region and the population is 377 as of 2021.

Saint-Joseph-des-Érables lies on the western bank of the Chaudière River, facing Saint-Joseph-de-Beauce, from which it has split in 1938. "Érables" refers to the large presence of maple trees on the municipality's territory.

== Demographics ==
Population trend:

- Population in 2021: 377 (2016 to 2021 population change: -8%)
- Population in 2016: 410
- Population in 2011: 420
- Population in 2006: 417
- Population in 2001: 460
- Population in 1996: 455
- Population in 1991: 447
- Population in 1986: 500
- Population in 1981: 448
- Population in 1976: 412
- Population in 1971: 441
- Population in 1966: 491
- Population in 1961: 505
- Population in 1956: 497
- Population in 1951: 511
- Population in 1941: 540

Private dwellings occupied by usual residents: 148 (total dwellings: 154)

Mother tongue:

- English as first language: 0%
- French as first language: 98.7%
- English and French as first language: 0%
- Other as first language: 0%
