= Saint-Elzéar, Chaudière-Appalaches =

Saint-Elzéar
- Municipality
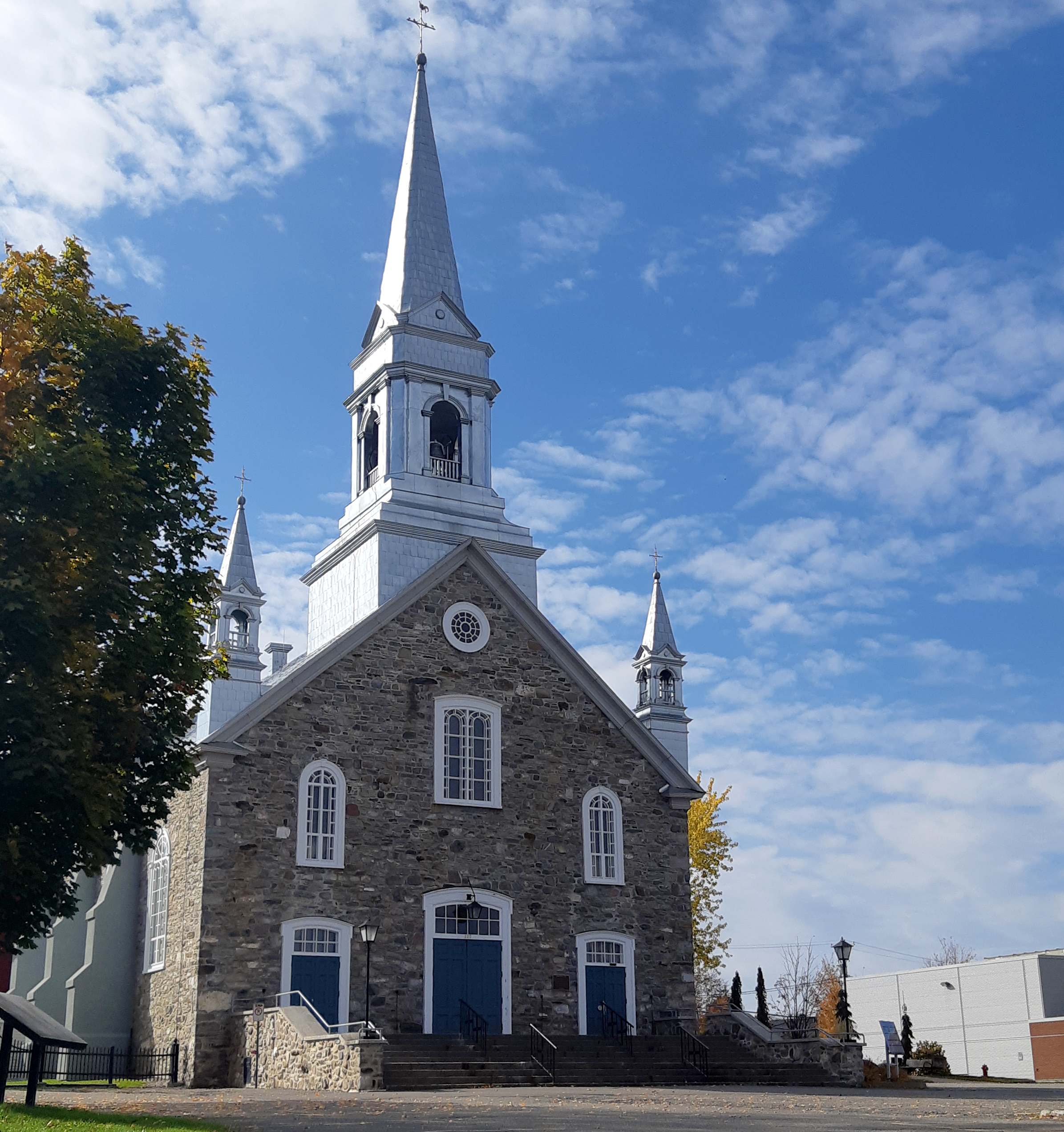
- Motto: Un village d'exception (French for "An exceptional village")
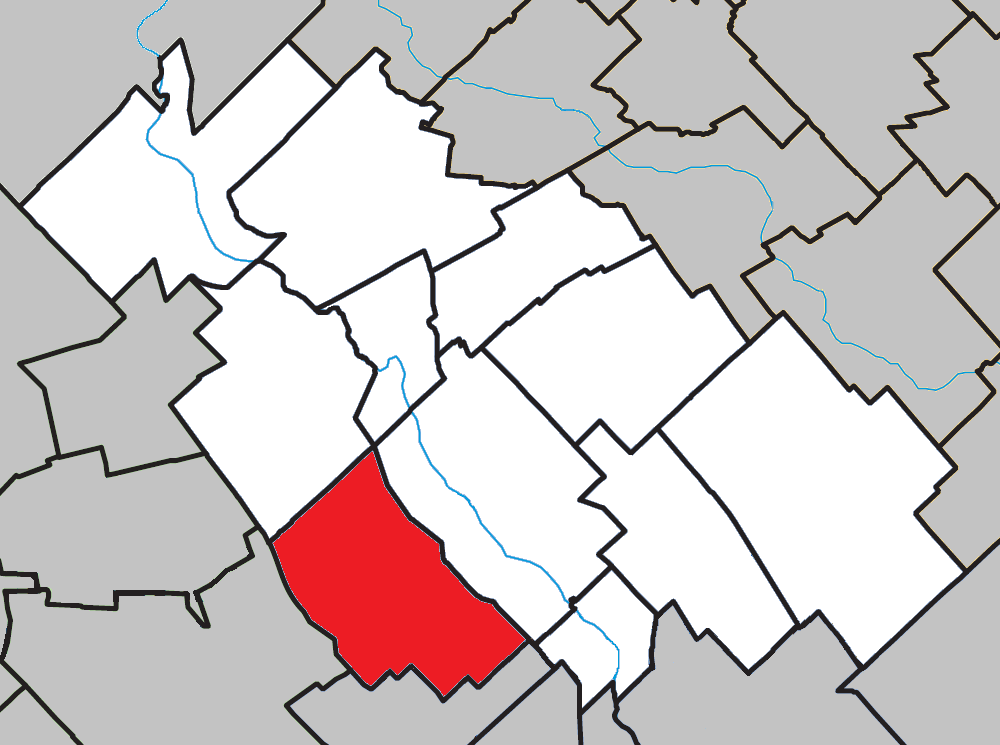
- Location within La Nouvelle-Beauce RCM.

- Location in southern Quebec.
- Coordinates: 46°24′N 71°04′W
- Country: Canada
- Province: Quebec
- Region: Chaudière-Appalaches
- RCM: La Nouvelle-Beauce
- Constituted: November 30, 1994

Government
  - Mayor: Hugo Berthiaume
  - Federal riding: Beauce
  - Prov. riding: Beauce-Nord

Area
  - Municipality: 87.10 km^{2} (33.63 sq mi)
  - Land: 87.07 km^{2} (33.62 sq mi)
  - Urban: 0.66 km^{2} (0.25 sq mi)

Population (2021)
  - Municipality: 2,623
  - Density: 30.1/km^{2} (78/sq mi)
  - Urban: 1,152
  - Urban density: 1,753.4/km^{2} (4,541/sq mi)
  - Pop 2016-2021: ▲9.3%
  - Dwellings: 1,031
- Time zone: UTC−5 (EST)
  - Summer (DST): UTC−4 (EDT)
- Postal code(s): G0S 2J0
- Area codes: 418 and 581
- Highways: R-216
- Website: www.st-elzear.ca

Saint-Elzéar (French pronunciation: [sɛ̃t‿ɛlzeaʁ]) is a municipality in La Nouvelle-Beauce Regional County Municipality in Quebec, Canada. It is part of the Chaudière-Appalaches region and the population was 2,623 as of the Canada 2021 Census. Founded in 1855, it was named in tribute to Elzéar-Henri Juchereau Duchesnay, seigneur of neighbouring Sainte-Marie-de-la-Nouvelle-Beauce.
