= Saint-Frédéric, Quebec =

Saint-Frédéric
- Parish municipality
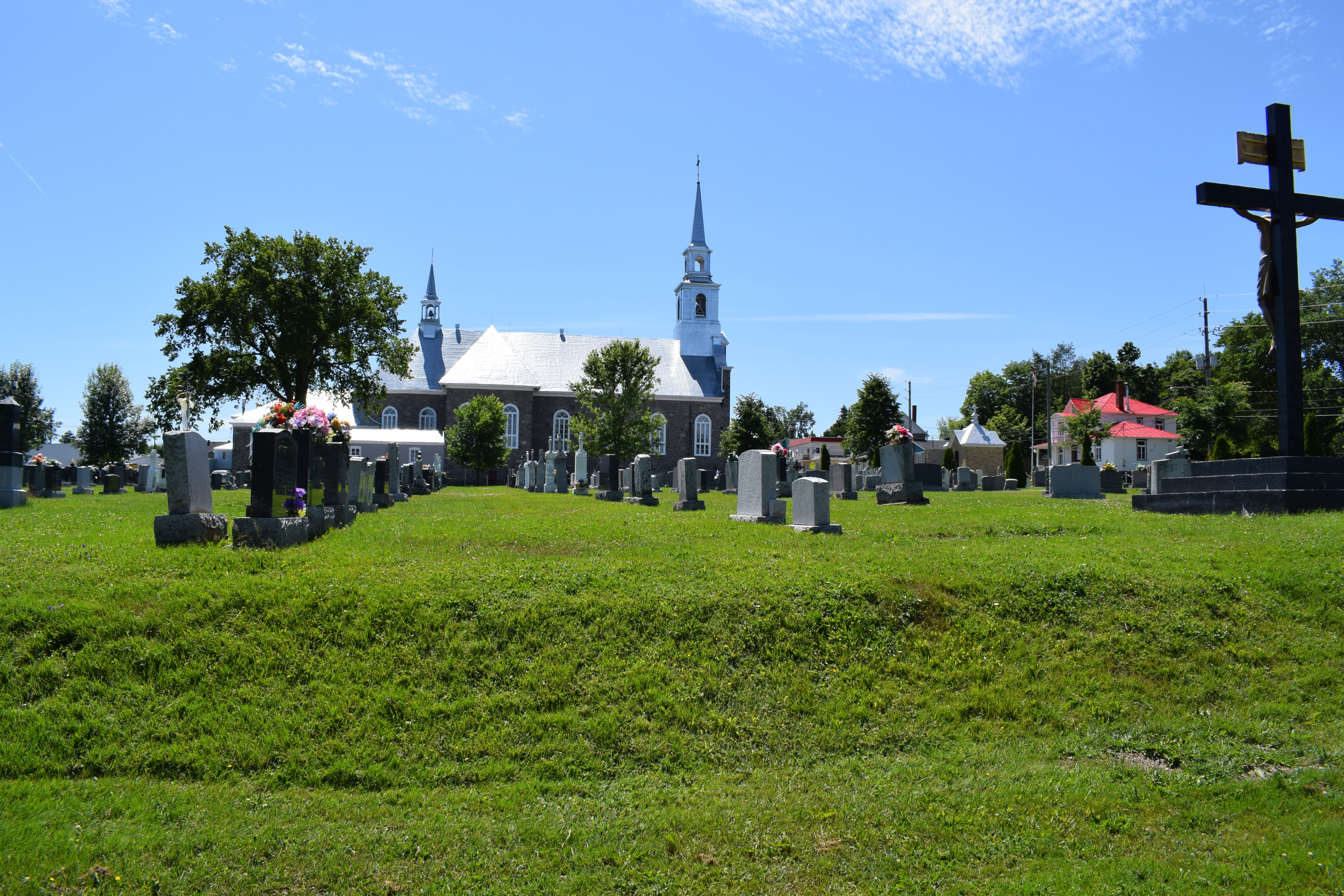

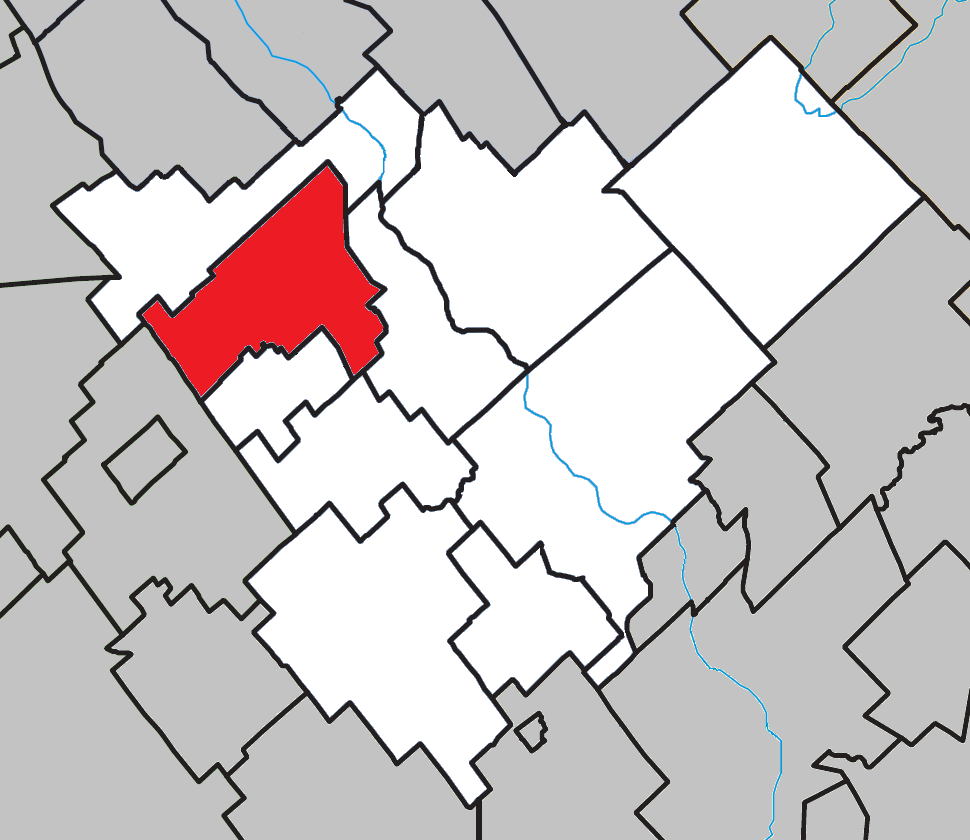
- Location within Beauce-Centre RCM.

- Location in southern Quebec.
- Coordinates: 46°18′N 70°58′W
- Country: Canada
- Province: Quebec
- Region: Chaudière-Appalaches
- RCM: Beauce-Centre
- Constituted: July 1, 1855
- Named for: Frederick of Utrecht

Government
  - Mayor: Micheline Grenier
  - Federal riding: Beauce
  - Prov. riding: Beauce-Nord

Area
  - Total: 72.30 km^{2} (27.92 sq mi)
  - Land: 72.35 km^{2} (27.93 sq mi)
- There is an apparent contradiction between two authoritative sources

Population (2021)
  - Total: 1,065
  - Density: 14.7/km^{2} (38/sq mi)
  - Pop 2016-2021: ▲6.8%
  - Dwellings: 443
- Time zone: UTC−5 (EST)
  - Summer (DST): UTC−4 (EDT)
- Postal code(s): G0N 1P0
- Area codes: 418 and 581
- Highways: R-112; R-276
- Website: www.saint-frederic.com

Saint-Frédéric (French pronunciation: [sɛ̃ fʁedeʁik]) is a parish in the Municipalité régionale de comté Beauce-Centre in Quebec, Canada. It is part of the Chaudière-Appalaches region and the population is 1,065 as of 2021. It is named after Reverend Frédéric Caron, first priest of Saint-Frédéric.

== History ==
It was around 1800 that the first settlers established themselves in what is now Saint-Frédéric, which at that time formed part of Saint-Joseph-de-la-Beauce. The municipality officially split from Saint-Joseph-de-la-Beauce in April 1856 under the name of Saint-Frédéric-de-Beauce, in memory of the first parish priest and founder of the parish, Frédéric Caron. Eventually the name will be shortened to become simply Saint-Frédéric. In 1918 the southern section of the municipality would secede to become Tring-Jonction.

Archbishop Louis-Albert Vachon was born in this parish.

== Demographics ==
In the 2021 Census of Population conducted by Statistics Canada, Saint-Frédéric had a population of 1,065 living in 422 of its 443 total private dwellings, a change of 6.8% from its 2016 population of 997. With a land area of 72.35 km^{2} (27.93 sq mi), it had a population density of 14.7/km^{2} (38.1/sq mi) in 2021.

Historical census populations – Saint-Frédéric

| Year | Pop. | ±% |
|---|---|---|
| 1861 | 1,051 | — |
| 1871 | 1,765 | +67.9% |
| 1881 | 1,801 | +2.0% |
| 1891 | 1,814 | +0.7% |
| 1901 | 1,814 | +0.0% |
| 1911 | 1,710 | −5.7% |
| 1921 | 1,189 | −30.5% |
| 1931 | 1,113 | −6.4% |

| Year | Pop. | ±% |
|---|---|---|
| 1941 | 1,306 | +17.3% |
| 1951 | 1,032 | −21.0% |
| 1956 | 1,003 | −2.8% |
| 1961 | 1,056 | +5.3% |
| 1966 | 938 | −11.2% |
| 1971 | 940 | +0.2% |
| 1976 | 900 | −4.3% |
| 1981 | 1,023 | +13.7% |

| Year | Pop. | ±% |
|---|---|---|
| 1986 | 1,044 | +2.1% |
| 1991 | 1,008 | −3.4% |
| 1996 | 1,006 | −0.2% |
| 2001 | 1,087 | +8.1% |
| 2006 | 1,049 | −3.5% |
| 2011 | 1,085 | +3.4% |
| 2016 | 1,044 | −3.8% |
| 2021 | 1,065 | +2.0% |

Source: Statistics Canada

== Notable people ==
- Louis-Albert Vachon, archbishop of Quebec
