= Vallée-Jonction =

- Municipality
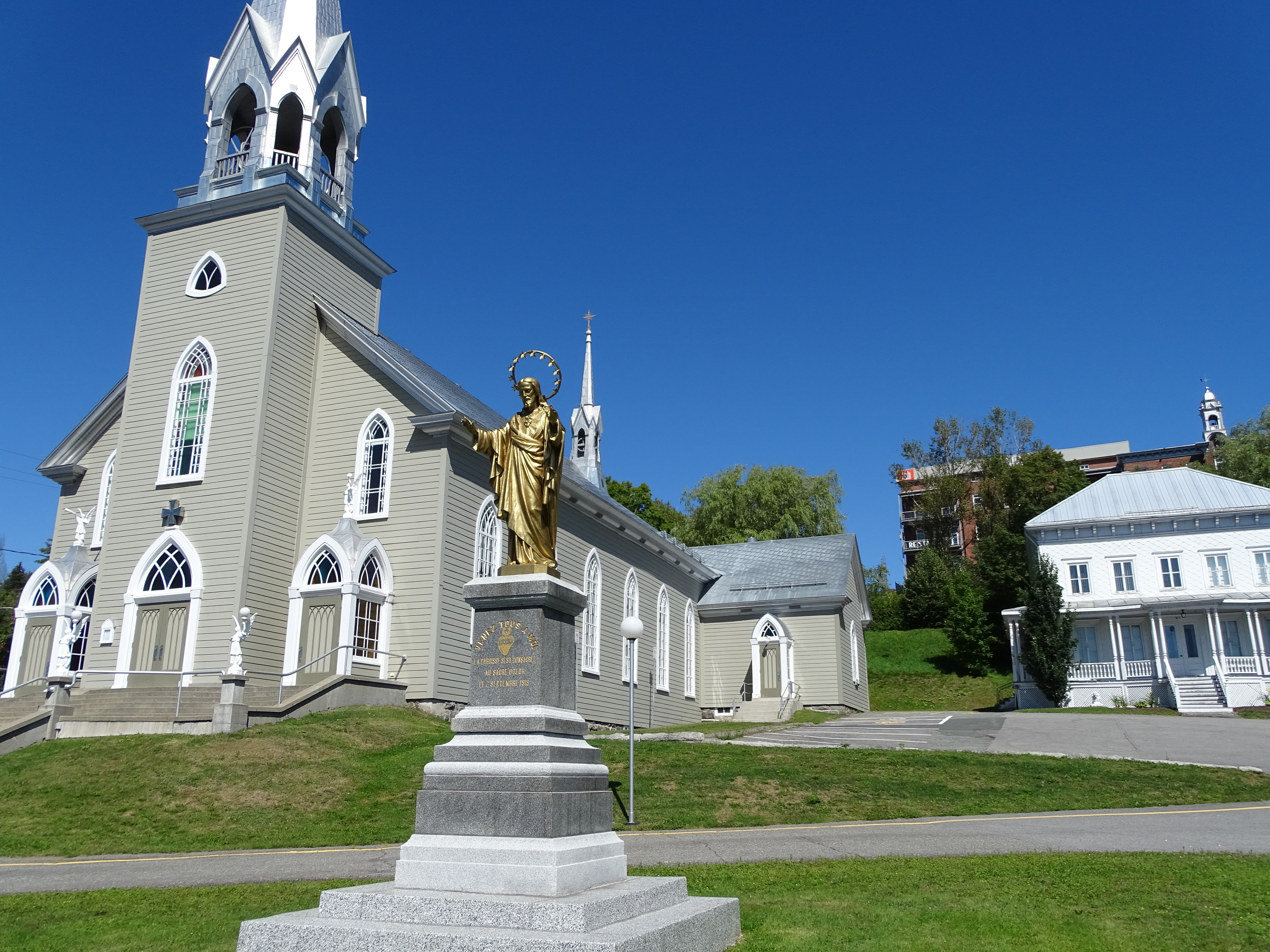
- L'Enfant-Jésus church and presbytery.

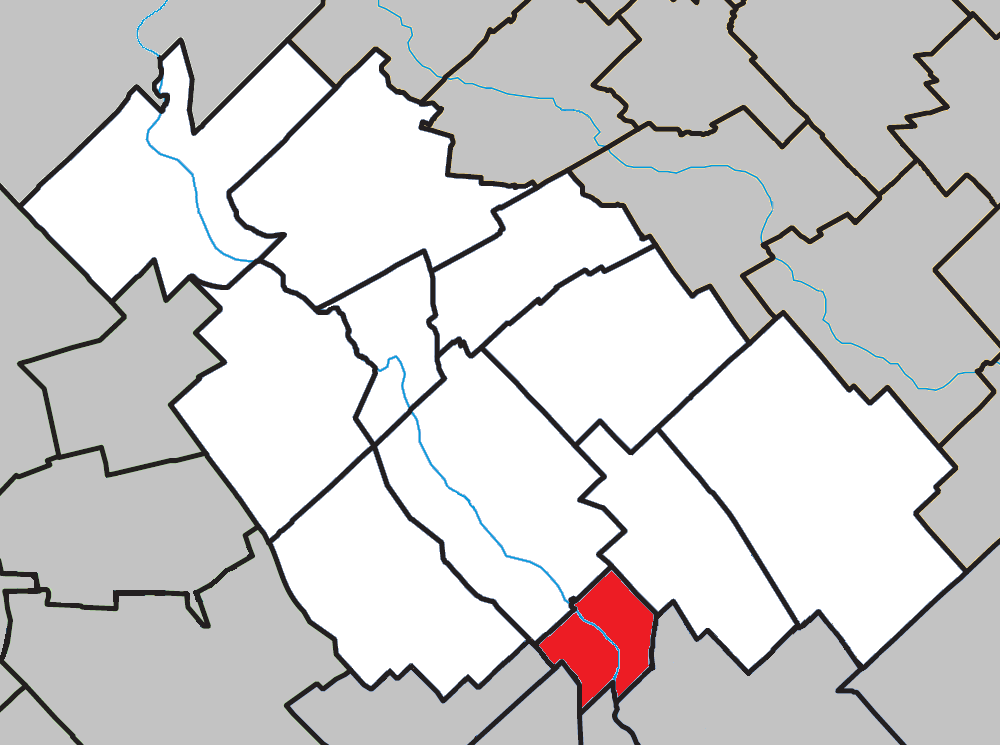
- Location within La Nouvelle-Beauce RCM.

- Location in southern Quebec.
- Coordinates: 46°22′N 70°55′W
- Country: Canada
- Province: Quebec
- Region: Chaudière-Appalaches
- RCM: La Nouvelle-Beauce
- Constituted: March 22, 1989

Government
  - Mayor: Patricia Drouin
  - Federal riding: Beauce
  - Prov. riding: Beauce-Nord

Area
  - Municipality: 25.90 km^{2} (10.00 sq mi)
  - Land: 25.32 km^{2} (9.78 sq mi)

Population (2021)
  - Municipality: 1,864
  - Density: 73.1/km^{2} (189/sq mi)
  - Urban: 1,213
  - Pop 2016-2021: ▼0.6%
  - Dwellings: 862
- Time zone: UTC−5 (EST)
  - Summer (DST): UTC−4 (EDT)
- Postal code(s): G0S 3J0
- Area codes: 418 and 581
- Highways A-73: R-112; R-173
- Website: www.vallee jonction.qc.ca

Vallée-Jonction (French pronunciation: [vale ʒɔ̃ksjɔ̃]) is a municipality in La Nouvelle-Beauce Regional County Municipality, in Quebec, Canada. It is part of the Chaudière-Appalaches region and had a population of 1,864 as of 2021.

== History ==
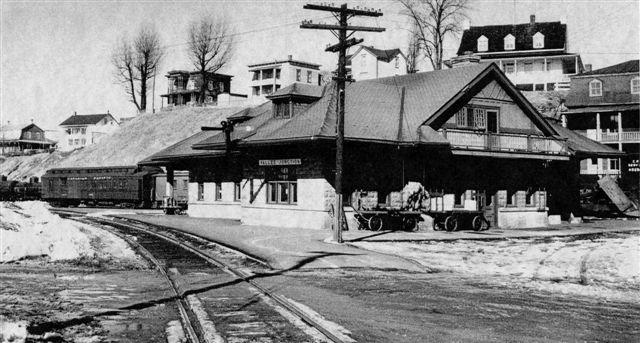
The station, in 1945.

In 1881, the Lévis and Kennebec Railway opened a train station between Sainte-Marie and Saint-Joseph-de-Beauce named Beauce-Jonction. When the Quebec Central Railway bought it in 1882, Beauce-Jonction became one of the most important train stations on the Lévis-Sherbrooke line.

In 1900, the parish of L'Enfant-Jésus was constituted, and part of its territory was detached in 1924 to form a village that has the same name but is known locally as Beauce-Junction, after the post office opened in 1883. The village changed its name to Vallée-Jonction in 1949. L'Enfant-Jésus and Vallée-Jonction amalgamated in 1989 to form the current municipality.

== Geography ==
=== Lakes & Rivers ===
The following waterways pass through or are situated within the municipality's boundaries:

- Chaudière River a river with its source near the Town of Lac-Mégantic.
- Morency River a tributary of the east bank of the Chaudière River.

== Demographics ==
=== Population ===
Historical Census Data - Vallée-Jonction, Quebec

Year	Pop.	±%
1991	1,906	—
1996	1,827	−4.1%
2001	1,882	+3.0%

Year	Pop.	±%
2006	1,868	−0.7%
2011	1,940	+3.9%
2016	1,875	−3.4%

Year	Pop.	±%
2021	1,864	−0.6%

Source: Statistics Canada
