= Chaudière River =

River in Estrie and Chaudière-Appalaches, Quebec, Canada

Chaudière Kik8ntekw
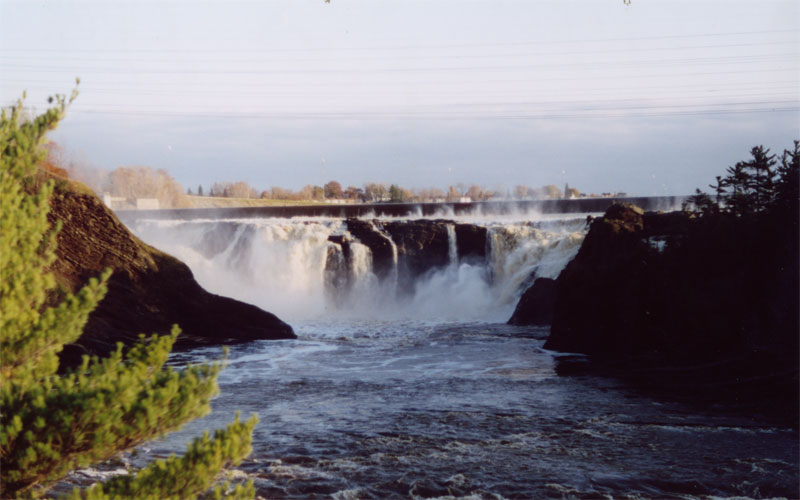
- Chutes-de-la-Chaudière

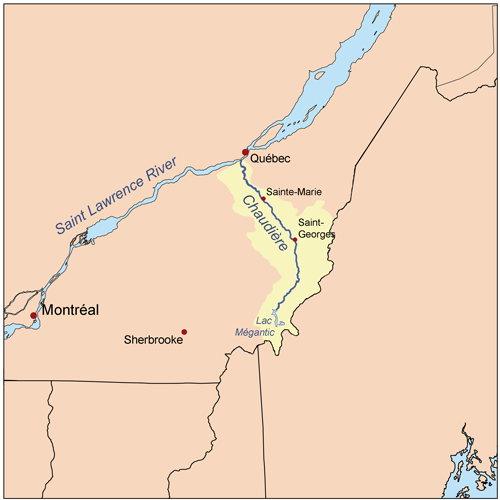
- Chaudiere River basin
- Etymology: FR Cauldron/boiler river AB River of the fields
- Native name: Kik8ntekw (Eastern Abnaki)

Location
- Country: Canada
- Province: Quebec

Physical characteristics
- Source: Lake Mégantic
  - location: Lac-Mégantic, Estrie
  - coordinates: 45°34′20″N 70°53′00″W
- Mouth: Saint Lawrence River
  - location: Lévis, Chaudière-Appalaches
  - coordinates: 46°44′34″N 71°16′43″W
- Length: 185 km (115 mi)
- Basin size: 6,682 km^{2} (2,580 sq mi)
- Discharge
  - average: 114 m^{3}/s (4,000 cu ft/s)
  - minimum: 11 m^{3}/s (390 cu ft/s)
  - maximum: 470 m^{3}/s (17,000 cu ft/s)

The Chaudière River (French pronunciation: [ʃodjɛʁ]; French for "Cauldron" or "Boiler"; Abenaki: Kik8ntekw) is a 185-kilometre-long (115 mi) river with its source near the Town of Lac-Mégantic, in southeast Quebec, Canada. From its source Lake Mégantic in the Estrie region, it runs northwards to flow into the St. Lawrence River opposite Quebec City.

== Geography ==
The river's drainage area is 6,682 square kilometres (2,580 mi^{2}), initially in the Appalachian Mountains, then in the low-lands of the St. Lawrence. It includes 236 lakes covering 62 square kilometres (24 mi^{2}) and is populated by approximately 180,000 inhabitants. Its annual medium flow at the station of Saint-Lambert-de-Lauzon is 114 cubic metres per second (4,000 cu ft/s), varying from 11 cubic metres per second (390 cu ft/s) (low water) to 470 cubic metres per second (17,000 cu ft/s) (spring high water), with historical maximum of 1,760 cubic metres per second (62,000 cu ft/s).

Its principal tributaries are:

- Rivière du Loup (not to be confused with Rivière du Loup in the Bas-Saint-Laurent), also known as the Rivière Linière
- Famine River
- Beaurivage River
- Bras Saint-Victor

The river's basin has nearly 50 percent of the faunal richness of Quebec, namely 330 out of 653 vertebrate species known in the province can be found there.

The river, and the 40-metre-high (130 ft) Chaudière Falls which it passes over, are popular outdoor recreation areas.

=== Municipalities crossed ===
Its course crosses the regional county municipalities (MRC) of:

Left bank of the Chaudière river (from the confluence):

- Lévis ("Saint-Rédempteur" and "Saint-Étienne-de-Lauzon" sectors);
- MRC of La Nouvelle-Beauce in Chaudière-Appalaches: municipalities of Saint-Bernard, Saint-Lambert-de-Lauzon, Scott, Sainte-Marie;
- MRC Beauce-Centre in Chaudière-Appalaches: municipalities of Saint-Joseph-des-Érables, Beauceville;
- MRC Beauce-Sartigan, in Chaudière-Appalaches: municipalities of Notre-Dame-des-Pins, Saint-Georges, Saint-Martin, Saint-Gédéon-de-Beauce;
- MRC Le Granit in Estrie: municipalities of Saint-Ludger, Sainte-Cécile-de-Whitton, Lac-Mégantic.

Right bank of the Chaudière river (from the confluence):

- Lévis ("Charny" and "Sainte-Hélène-de-Breakeyville" sectors);
- MRC of La Nouvelle-Beauce in Chaudière-Appalaches: municipalities of Sainte-Marie, Vallée-Jonction,
- MRC Beauce-Centre in Chaudière-Appalaches: municipality of Beauceville,
- MRC of Beauce-Sartigan in Chaudière-Appalaches: municipalities of Saint-Joseph-de-Beauce, Saint-Simon-les-Mines, Saint-Georges, Saint-Martin, Saint-Gédéon-de-Beauce,
- MRC Le Granit in Estrie: municipalities of Saint-Robert-Bellarmin, Frontenac, Audet, Lac-Mégantic ("Fatima" sector)

== History ==
The Abenaki Nation, whose homeland Ndakinna encompasses the river and Chaudière Falls, call it "Kik8ntekw" or "Kikôntekw", meaning "River of the Fields." On the charts of Samuel de Champlain, it was given the name "Etchemin River" (a name now used for another river whose drainage area borders with that of the Chaudière River). It was called "Rivière du Sault de la Chaudière" for a period of time before it became simply "Rivière Chaudière" towards the end of the 18th century. This name translates as boiler and refers to the waterfall close to its mouth.

Its location was strategic for French colonization during the 18th century, because the river was a natural link between New France and the British colonies to the south. It was also used by Benedict Arnold at the time of his 1775 expedition in the invasion of Quebec.

In 1823, gold was found along its shores in the Eastern Townships of Quebec.

On 6 July 2013 the Lac-Mégantic derailment caused a major oil spill which contaminated the river at its source at Lac Mégantic. Downstream communities such as Saint-Georges (80 kilometres (50 mi) to the northeast) were forced to obtain potable water from alternate sources and residents asked to limit their water consumption. Floating barriers were installed in an attempt to contain the contamination.

== Description ==
The Chaudière Valley largely crosses the Quebec region of Beauce. It has shaped its industries and its way of life, particularly in spring when its overflows during snowmelt in inhabited areas are frequent, despite its course regulated by 160 dams and retaining dikes. The river runs through several towns and villages in the region, including Saint-Ludger, Saint-Gédéon-de-Beauce, Saint-Martin, Saint-Georges, Notre-Dame-des-Pins, Beauceville, Saint-Joseph-de-Beauce, Vallée-Jonction and Sainte-Marie, Quebec.

The river is a prime site for outdoor activities, particularly near lac Mégantic and Chutes-de-la-Chaudière park. Located near the mouth of the river, in Lévis, this park offers hiking and cycling trails as well as a footbridge suspended over the river, which offers a viewpoint on the fall, 35 metres (115 ft) high. The fall was harnessed for its hydro-electric potential in 1901, but was destroyed in 1970. The dam was rebuilt in 1999 on the remains of the old installations, and supplies a small hydro-electric plant of 24 megawatts (32,000 hp).

=== Gallery ===
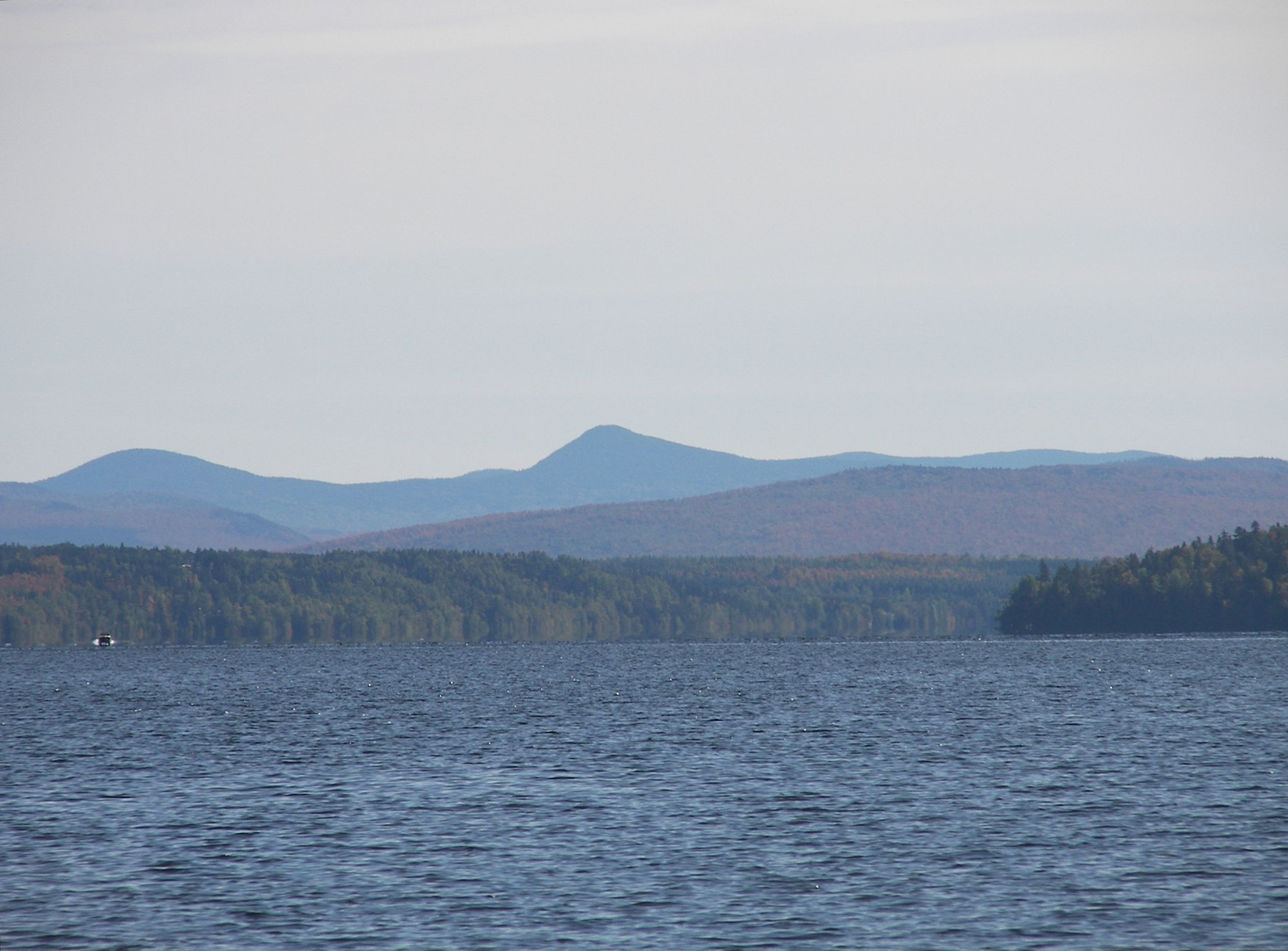
Lac Mégantic, head lake of the Chaudière.

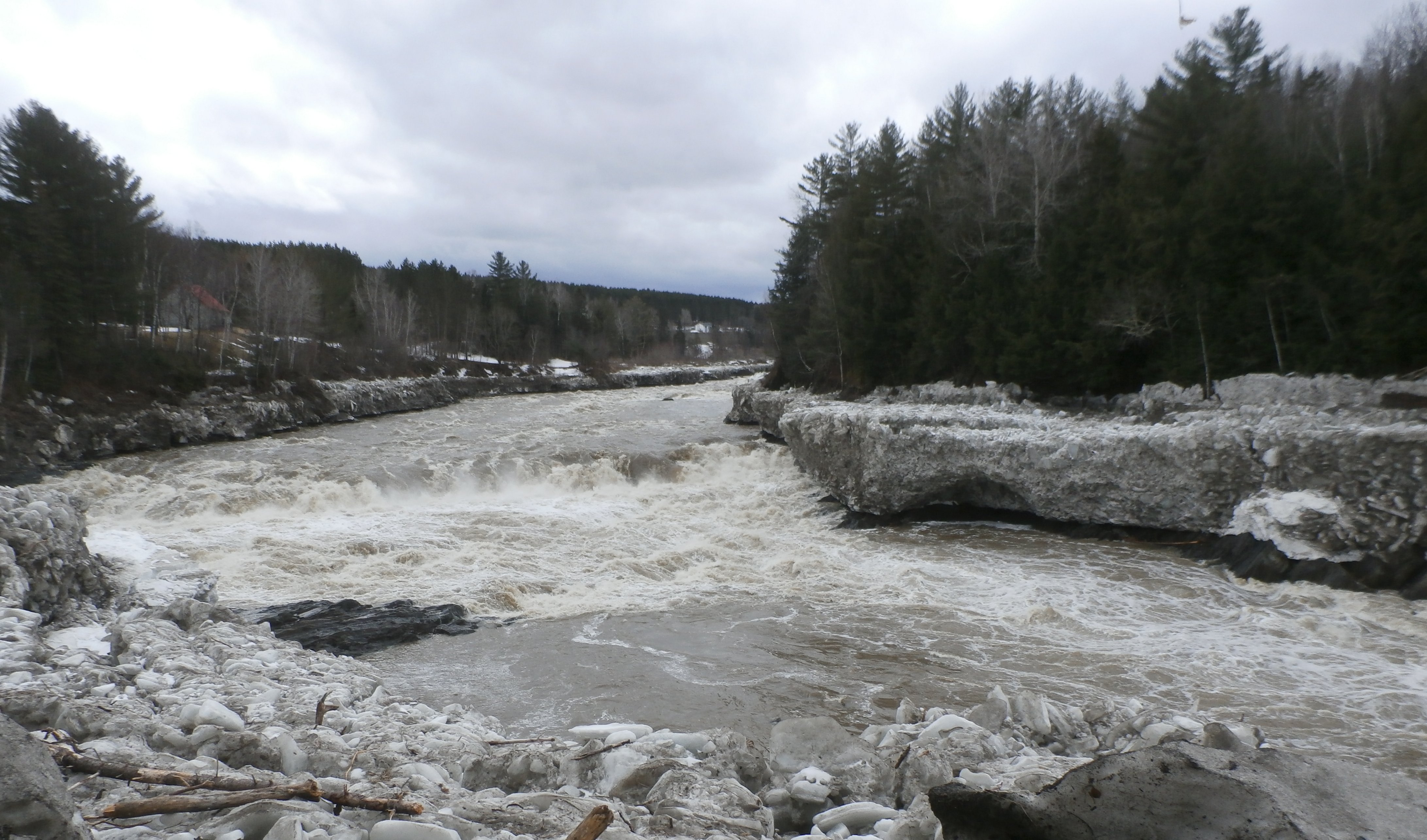
The Grand Sault, near Saint-Martin.

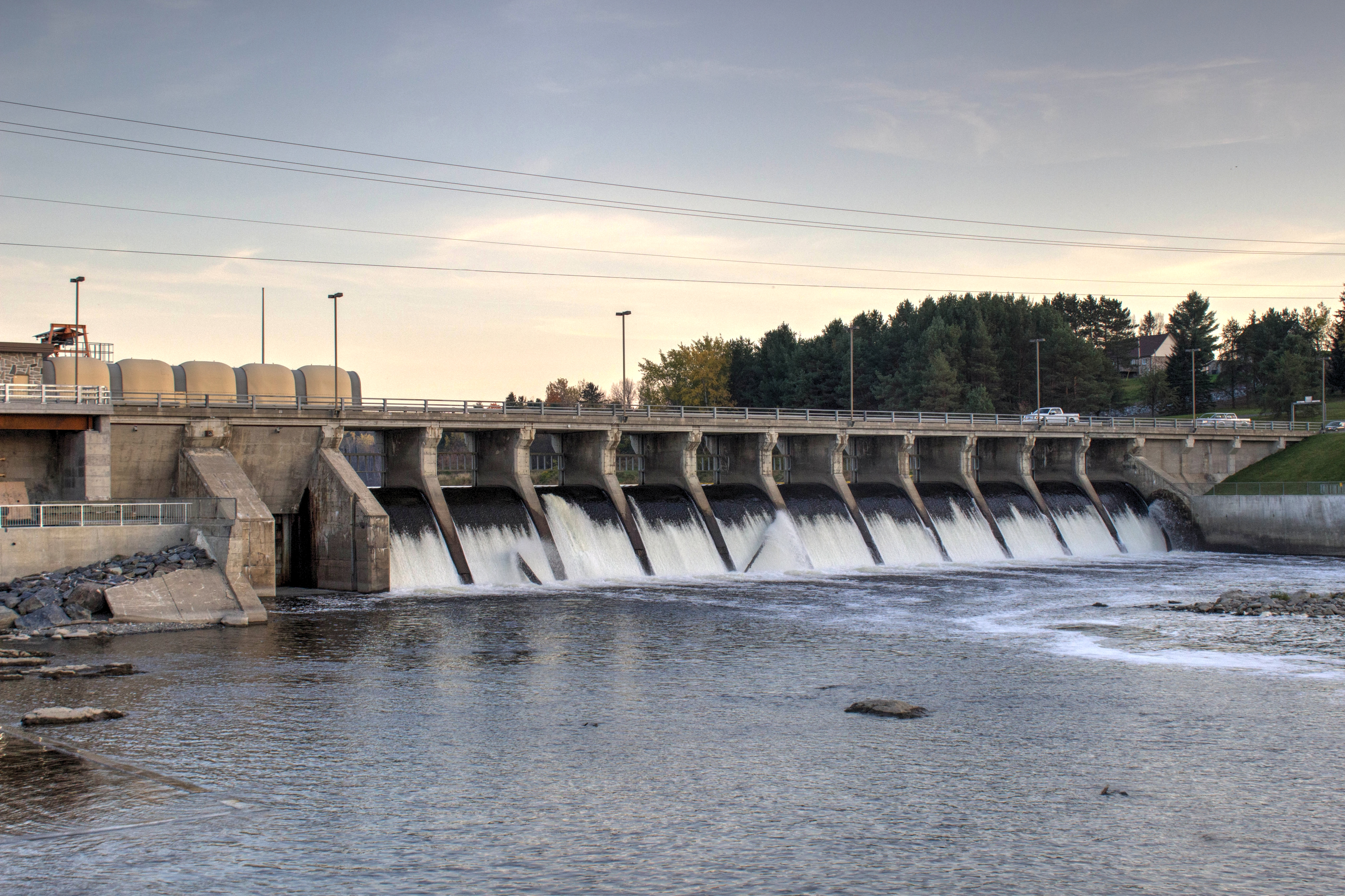
The Sartigan dam at Saint-Georges.

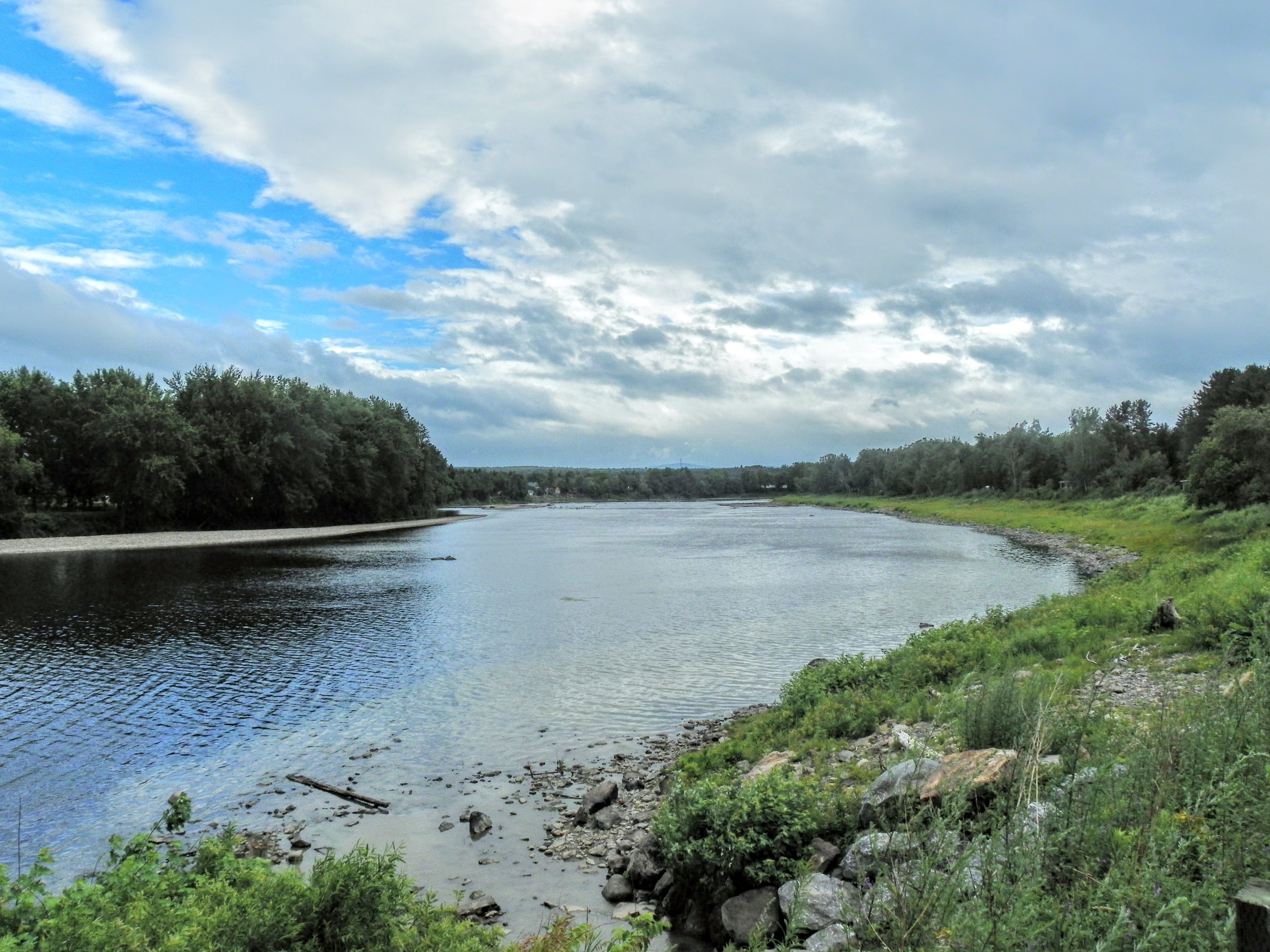
Meander at Scott, Quebec

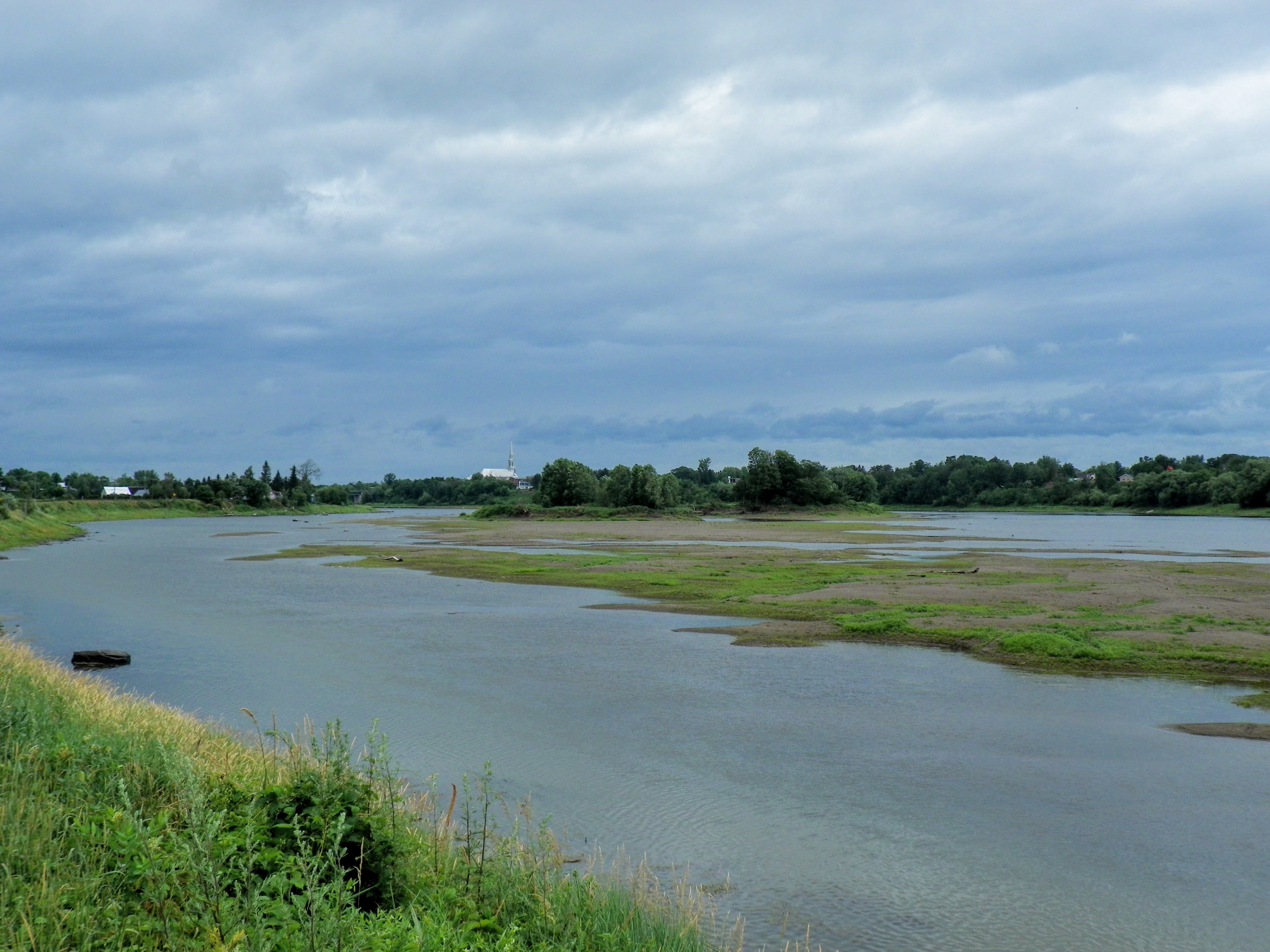
The islands near Saint-Lambert-de-Lauzon.

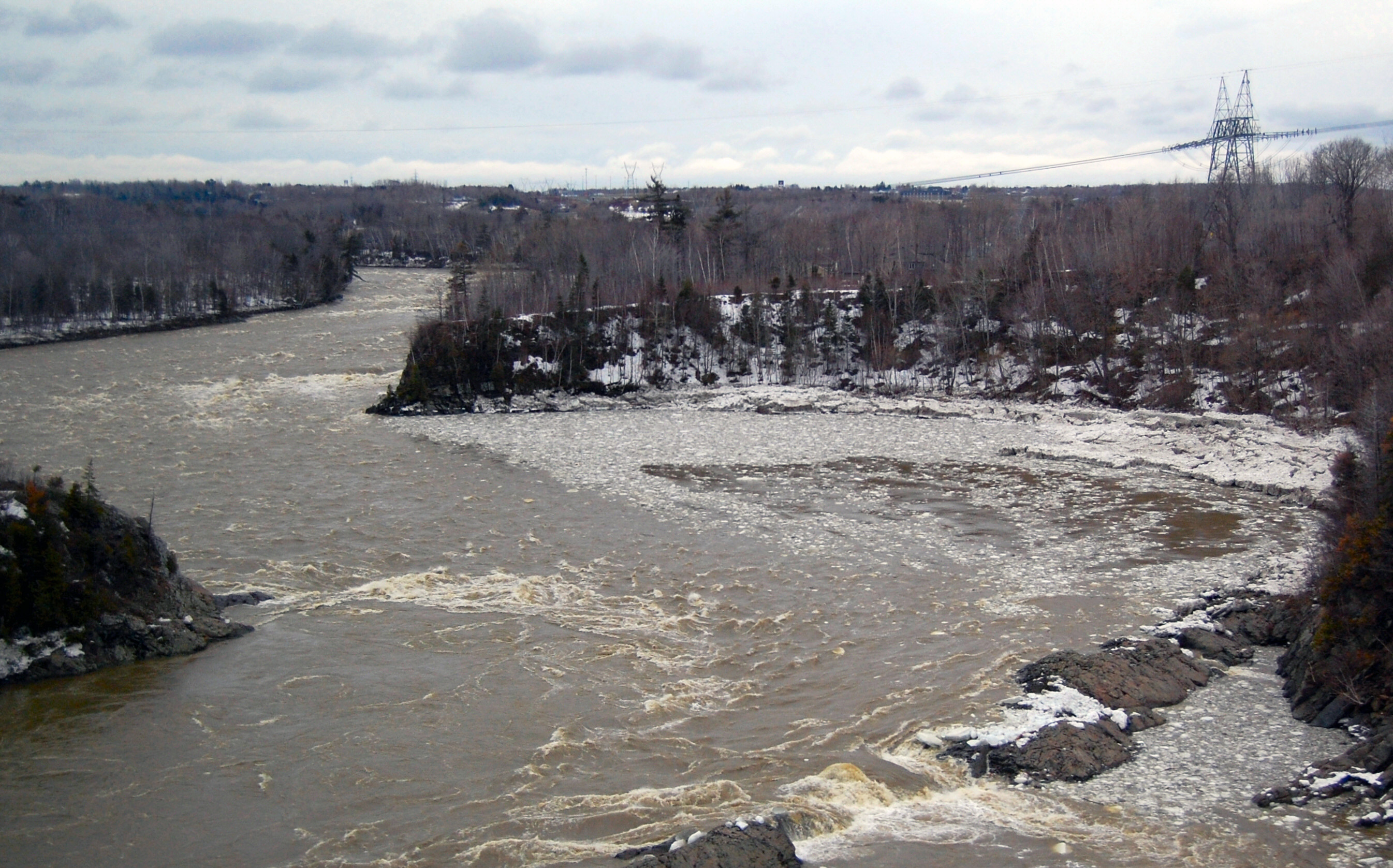
The river in flood.

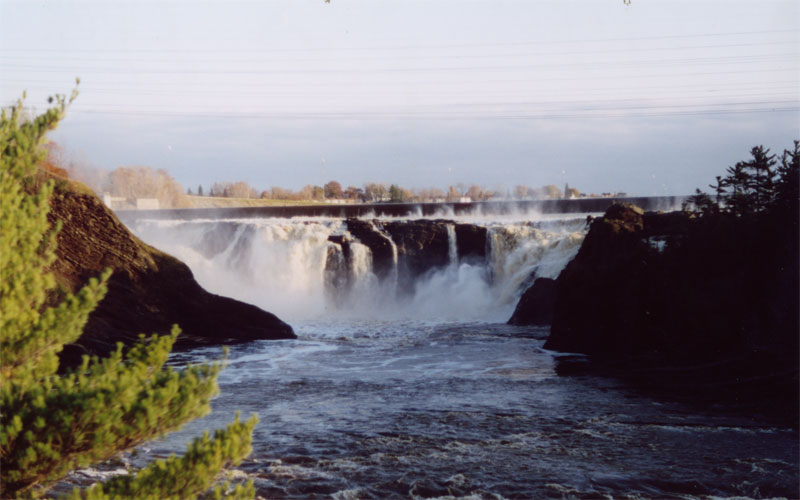
The Chaudière Falls.

== List of bridges ==
Sleepers	Photo	Municipality (ies)	Year of construction	Road	Length	Bridge type
Bridge 16179		Lake Mégantic		Frontenac Street		Steel girder bridge
Railway bridge		Lake Mégantic		Central Maine and Quebec Railway		Steel girder bridge
Bridge 18952		Lake Mégantic		Papineau Street		Precast prestressed concrete girder bridge
Bridge		Lake Mégantic		Québec Central Trail		
Bridge 10965		Lake Mégantic	2005	Route 161	110.6 metres (363 ft)	Steel girder bridge
Bridge 13899		Lac-Drolet and Audet	1969	Main path	68.4 metres (224 ft)	Precast prestressed concrete girder bridge
Soucy Bridge		Saint-Ludger	1958	Pont Street	61.5 metres (202 ft)	Reinforced concrete girder bridge
Bridge		Saint-Martin	2009	Multifunctional trail		Suspended walkway
Bridge 13967		Saint-Martin	1970	Route 269	132.1 metres (433 ft)	Steel girder bridge
Sartigan dam		Saint-Georges	1967	Barrage-Sartigan road		Concrete-gravity dam
David-Roy Bridge		Saint-Georges	1970	Route 271	184.9 metres (607 ft)	Steel girder bridge
Passerelle de la Seigneurie		Saint-Georges		Cycle path of the Domaine de la Seigneurie		Steel girder walkway
Manac footbridge		Saint-Georges		Cycle path of the Domaine de la Seigneurie		Steel girder walkway
Canam-Boa Franc Gateway		Saint-Georges		Cycle path of the Domaine de la Seigneurie		Steel girder walkway
Bridge 13921		Notre-Dame-des-Pins	1969	30th Street	279.6 metres (917 ft)	Precast prestressed concrete girder bridge
Pont Perrault		Notre-Dame-des-Pins	1929	Cycle lane	150.9 metres (495 ft)	Covered bridge
Desjardins Gateway		Beauceville	2008	Cycle lane	70 metres (230 ft)	Steel lifting gangway
Pont Fortin		Beauceville	1980	Route 108	230.9 metres (758 ft)	Steel box girder bridge
Bridge 00793		Saint-Joseph-de-Beauce and Saint-Joseph-des-Érables	1908	Route 276	138.6 metres (455 ft)	Lower steel deck bridge
Bridge 18298		Vallée-Jonction		Quebec Central Railway		Steel lower deck bridge
Bridge 00814		Vallée-Jonction	1938	Route 112	151.8 metres (498 ft)	Lower steel deck bridge
Bridge 10861		Sainte-Marie	2003	Route 216	164.4 metres (539 ft)	Steel girder bridge
Family Bridge-Beshro		Sainte-Marie	2015	Multifunctional trail	207 metres (679 ft)	Cable-stayed gangway
Scott's Bridge		Scott	1995	Route 171	210.1 metres (689 ft)	Steel girder bridge
Bridge 03994		Saint-Lambert-de-Lauzon	1960	Route 218	229.0 metres (751.3 ft)	Steel girder bridge
Bridge 14760		Lévis	1976	Autoroute 73	261.2 metres (857 ft)	Precast prestressed concrete girder bridge
Bridge 14761		Lévis	1975	Autoroute 73	166.6 metres (547 ft)	Precast prestressed concrete girder bridge
Railway bridge		Lévis		Canadian National		Steel girder bridge
Chutes-de-la-Chaudière footbridge		Lévis		Cycle lane	113 metres (371 ft)	Suspension bridge
Bridge 04011S		Lévis	1965	Autoroute 20	164.1 metres (538 ft)	Bridge with upper deck in reinforced concrete
Bridge 04011N		Lévis	1967	Autoroute 20	164.7 metres (540 ft)	Bridge with upper deck in reinforced concrete
Bridge 13887		Lévis	1960	Autoroute 73	309.4 metres (1,015 ft)	Steel girder bridge
Railway bridge		Lévis		Canadian National		Steel girder bridge
Bridge 16928		Lévis	2010	Route 132 and 175	251.0 metres (823.5 ft)	Steel crutch bridge

== See also ==
- List of rivers of Quebec
