= Tring-Jonction =

- Village municipality
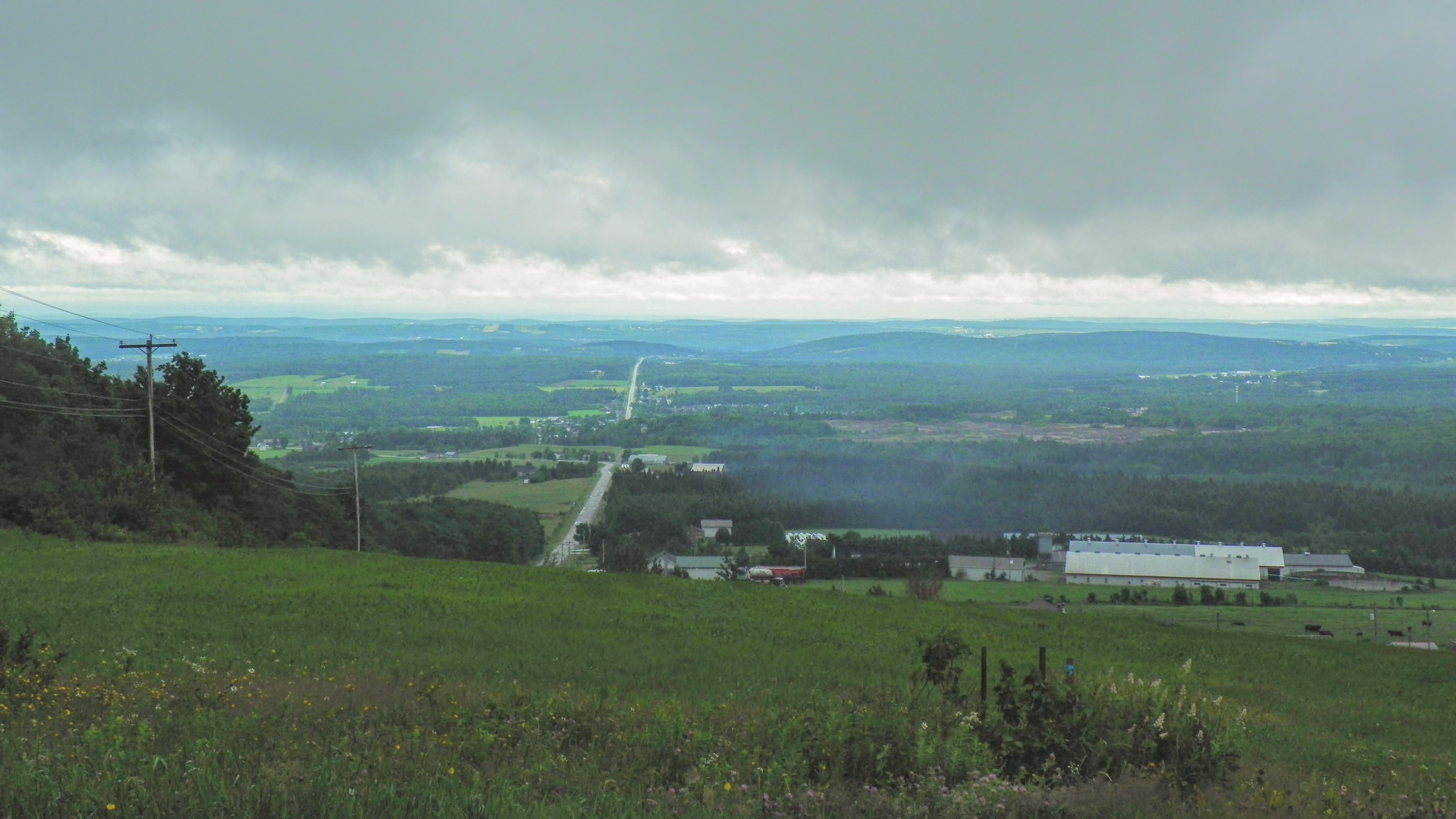
- View from Saint-Frédéric.
- Motto: Si bien chez nous
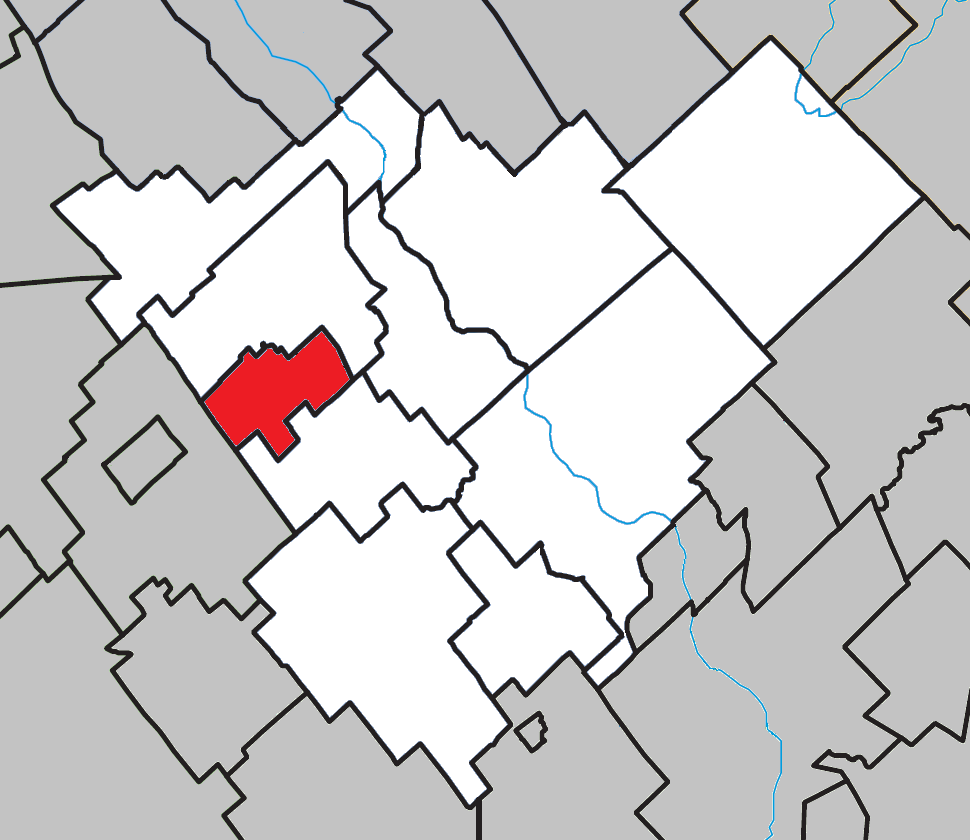
- Location within Beauce-Centre RCM.

- Location in southern Quebec.
- Coordinates: 46°16′N 70°59′W
- Country: Canada
- Province: Quebec
- Region: Chaudière-Appalaches
- RCM: Beauce-Centre
- Constituted: November 21, 1918
- Named for: Tring

Government
  - Mayor: Mario Groleau
  - Federal riding: Beauce
  - Prov. riding: Beauce-Nord

Area
  - Total: 27.30 km^{2} (10.54 sq mi)
  - Land: 27.32 km^{2} (10.55 sq mi)

Population (2021)
  - Total: 1,526
  - Density: 55.9/km^{2} (145/sq mi)
  - Pop 2016-2021: ▲5.4%
  - Dwellings: 687
- Time zone: UTC−5 (EST)
  - Summer (DST): UTC−4 (EDT)
- Postal code(s): G0N 1X0
- Area codes: 418 and 581
- Highways: R-112
- Website: www.tringjonction.qc.ca

Tring-Jonction (French pronunciation: [tʁiŋ ʒɔ̃ksjɔ̃]) is a village in the Beauce-Centre Regional County Municipality in the Chaudière-Appalaches region of Quebec, Canada. Its population is 1,526 as of 2021.

It is named after Tring, a town in Hertfordshire, England. "Jonction" refers to the Quebec Central railway station that was built in 1881.

== History ==
Tring-Jonction was founded in 1918 by Ephrem Lagueux by splitting away from Saint-Frédéric-de-Beauce.

== Demographics ==
In the 2021 Census of Population conducted by Statistics Canada, Tring-Jonction had a population of 1,526 living in 657 of its 687 total private dwellings, a change of 5.4% from its 2016 population of 1,448. With a land area of 27.32 km^{2} (10.55 sq mi), it had a population density of 55.9/km^{2} (144.7/sq mi) in 2021.

Historical census populations – Tring-Jonction

Year	Pop.	±%
1921	351	—
1931	430	+22.5%
1941	288	−33.0%
1951	751	+160.8%
1956	1,083	+44.2%
1961	1,214	+12.1%

Year	Pop.	±%
1966	1,297	+6.8%
1971	1,283	−1.1%
1976	1,248	−2.7%
1981	1,303	+4.4%
1986	1,333	+2.3%
1991	1,370	+2.8%

Year	Pop.	±%
1996	1,387	+1.2%
2001	1,333	−3.9%
2006	1,380	+3.5%
2011	1,473	+6.7%
2016	1,448	−1.7%
2021	1,526	+5.4%

Population counts are not adjusted for boundary changes.
Source: Statistics Canada

Private dwellings occupied by usual residents (2021): 657 (total dwellings: 687)

Mother tongue (2021):

- English as first language: 0.7%
- French as first language: 98.4%
- English and French as first language: 0.3%
- Other as first language: 1.0%
