= Saint-Séverin, Chaudière-Appalaches =

Saint-Séverin
- Parish municipality
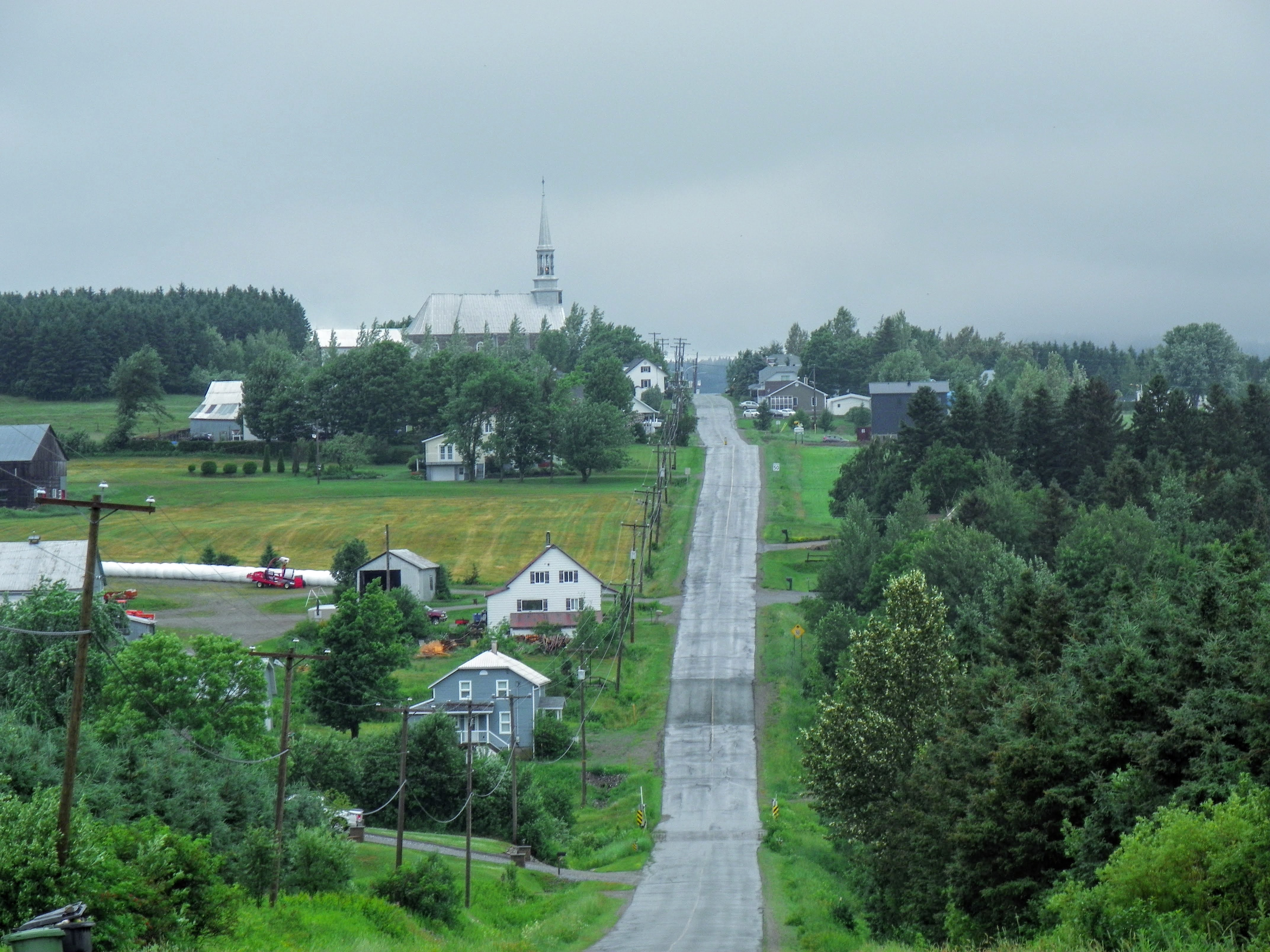
- The village core, as seen from Rang 1.
- Motto: Fièrement différent
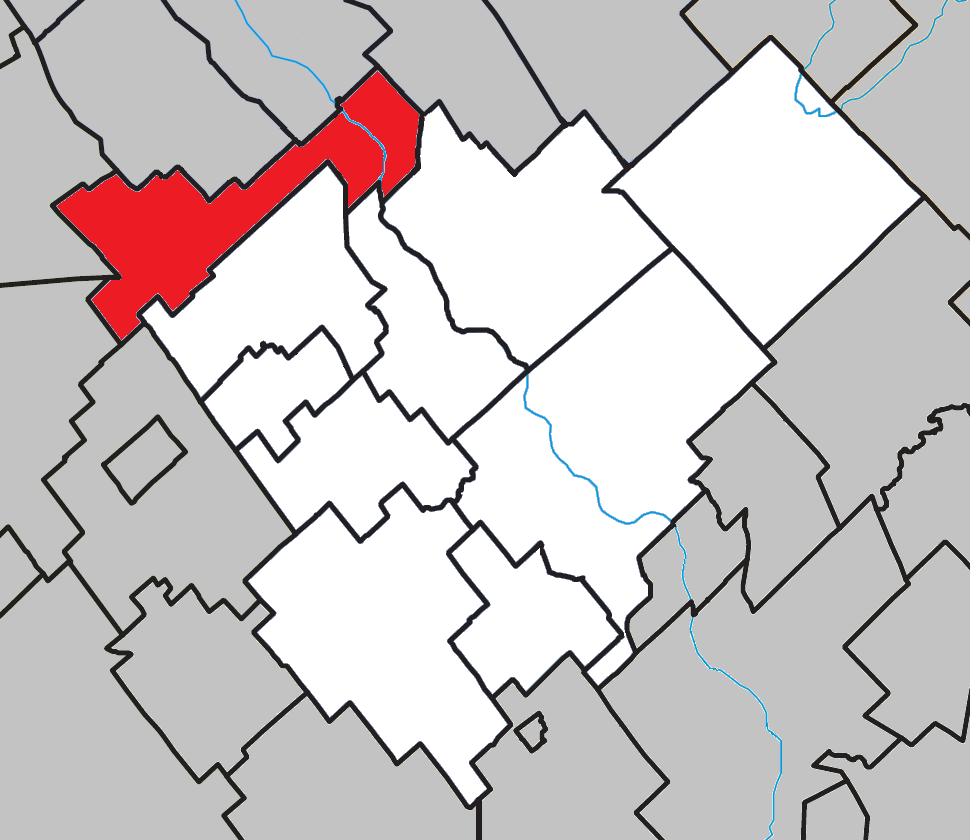
- Location within Beauce-Centre RCM.

- Location in southern Quebec.
- Coordinates: 46°19′N 71°03′W
- Country: Canada
- Province: Quebec
- Region: Chaudière-Appalaches
- RCM: Beauce-Centre
- Constituted: December 24, 1875

Government
  - Mayor: Francois Proulx
  - Federal riding: Beauce
  - Prov. riding: Beauce-Nord

Area
  - Total: 58.70 km^{2} (22.66 sq mi)
  - Land: 58.92 km^{2} (22.75 sq mi)
- There is an apparent contradiction between two authoritative sources

Population (2021)
  - Total: 300
  - Density: 5.1/km^{2} (13/sq mi)
  - Pop 2016-2021: ▲7.9%
  - Dwellings: 191
- Time zone: UTC−5 (EST)
  - Summer (DST): UTC−4 (EDT)
- Postal code(s): G0N 1V0
- Area codes: 418 and 581
- Highways: No major routes
- Website: www.st-severin.qc.ca

Saint-Séverin (French pronunciation: [sɛ̃ sevʁɛ̃]) is a parish in the Beauce-Centre Regional County Municipality in Quebec, Canada. It is part of the Chaudière-Appalaches region and the population is 300 as of 2021. It is named after Reverend Édouard-Séverin Fafard, founder of the parish in 1864.

== Demographics ==
Historical Census Data - Saint-Séverin, Quebec
Year	Pop.	±%
1881	924	—
1891	790	−14.5%
1901	706	−10.6%
1911	647	−8.4%
1921	631	−2.5%
1931	695	+10.1%
1941	808	+16.3%
1951	666	−17.6%
1956	638	−4.2%
1961	516	−19.1%
1966	397	−23.1%
1971	354	−10.8%
1976	318	−10.2%
1981	329	+3.5%
1986	288	−12.5%
1991	288	+0.0%
1996	272	−5.6%
2001	278	+2.2%
2006	279	+0.4%
2011	266	−4.7%
2016	278	+4.5%
2021	300	+7.9%

In the 2021 Census of Population conducted by Statistics Canada, Saint-Séverin had a population of 300 living in 143 of its 191 total private dwellings, a change of 7.9% from its 2016 population of 278. With a land area of 58.92 km^{2} (22.75 sq mi), it had a population density of 5.1/km^{2} (13.2/sq mi) in 2021.

Canada census – Saint-Séverin community profile

	2021	2016
Population	300 (+7.9% from 2016)	278 (+4.5% from 2011)
Land area	58.92 km^{2} (22.75 sq mi)	58.93 km^{2} (22.75 sq mi)
Population density	5.1/km^{2} (13/sq mi)	4.7/km^{2} (12/sq mi)
Median age	53.6 (M: 52.0, F: 54.0)	54.5 (M: 56.3, F: 52.0)
Private dwellings	191 (total)	188 (total)
Median household income	$56,400	$55,680

References: 2021 2016
