= Beauce-Centre Regional County Municipality =

Beauce-Centre Robert-Cliche (1982-2022)
- Regional county municipality
- Coordinates: 46°12′N 70°49′W
- Country: Canada
- Province: Quebec
- Region: Chaudière-Appalaches
- Effective: January 1, 1982
- Name change: July 30, 2022
- County seat: Beauceville

Government
  - Type: Prefecture
  - Prefect: Jonathan V. Bolduc

Area
  - Total: 844.80 km^{2} (326.18 sq mi)
  - Land: 839.60 km^{2} (324.17 sq mi)

Population (2021)
  - Total: 19,253
  - Density: 22.9/km^{2} (59/sq mi)
  - Change 2016-2021: ▲0.7%
  - Dwellings: 8,827
- Time zone: UTC−5 (EST)
  - Summer (DST): UTC−4 (EDT)
- Area codes: 418 and 581
- Website: www.beaucerc.com

Beauce-Centre (French pronunciation: [bos sɑ̃tʁ]) is a regional county municipality in the Chaudière-Appalaches region of southeastern Quebec, Canada. It is located on the Chaudière River, between La Nouvelle-Beauce Regional County Municipality and Beauce-Sartigan Regional County Municipality.

Established in 1982 as the successor to Beauce County under the name Robert-Cliche, Beauce-Centre is made up of ten municipalities and is mainly French-speaking. The territory is a mix of urban and rural. Beauceville, the county seat, is the most populated municipality.

It was originally named after Quebecois politician, writer, lawyer, and judge Robert Cliche. He was born in Saint-Joseph-de-Beauce, one of Beauce-Centre's municipalities. The regional county municipality's name was officially changed on 30 July 2022.

== Subdivisions ==
There are 10 subdivisions within the RCM:

Cities & Towns (2)

- Beauceville
- Saint-Joseph-de-Beauce

Municipalities (4)

- Saint-Alfred
- Saint-Joseph-des-Érables
- Saint-Odilon-de-Cranbourne
- Saint-Victor

Parishes (3)

- Saint-Frédéric
- Saint-Jules
- Saint-Séverin

Villages (1)

- Tring-Jonction

== Transportation ==
=== Access Routes ===
Highways and numbered routes that run through the municipality, including external routes that start or finish at the county border:

- Autoroutes
  - A-73
- Principal Highways
  - R-108
  - R-112
  - R-173
- Secondary Highways
  - R-276
- External Routes
  - None

== See also ==
- List of regional county municipalities and equivalent territories in Quebec
- Beauce, Quebec
