= Saint-Joseph-de-Beauce =

- City
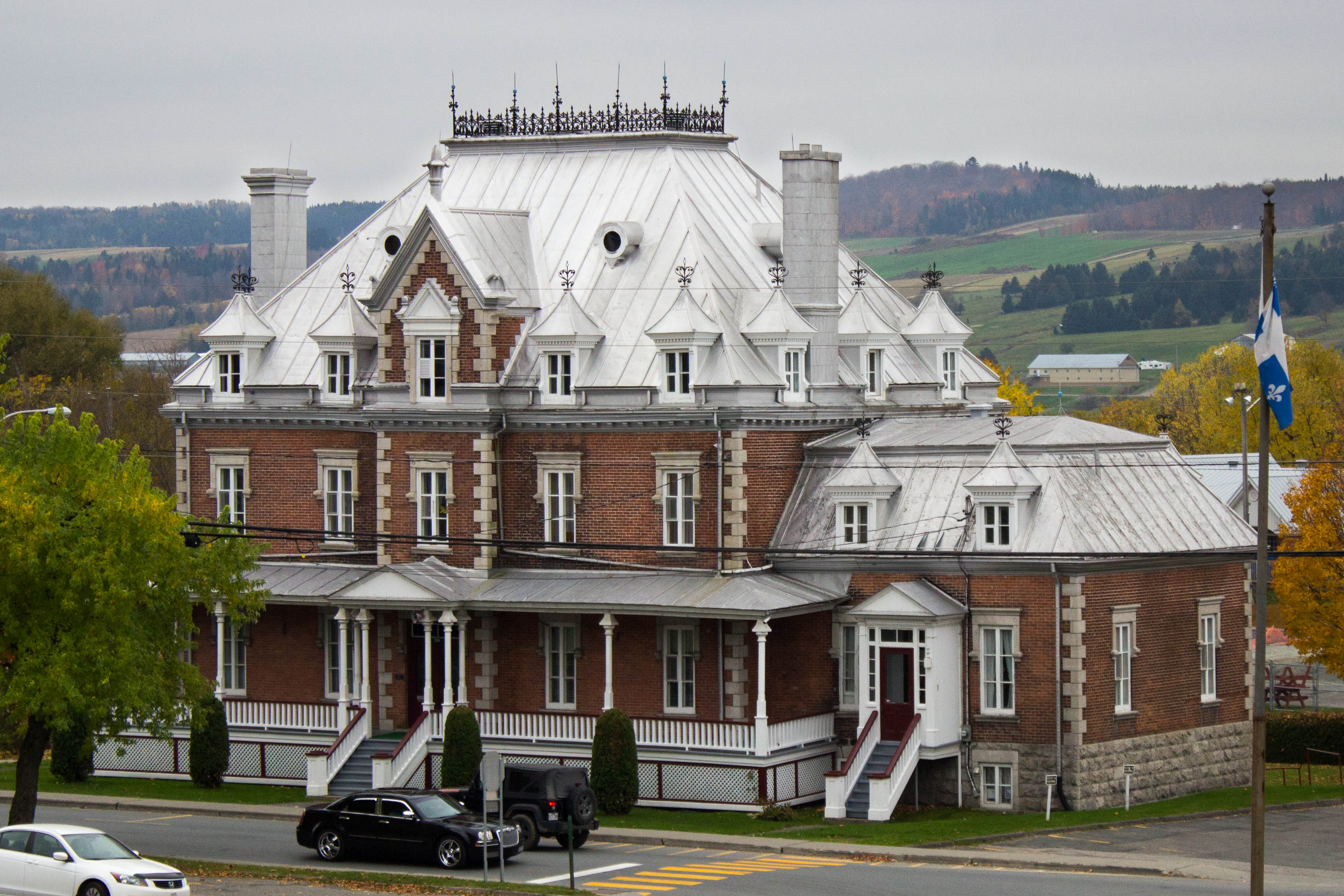

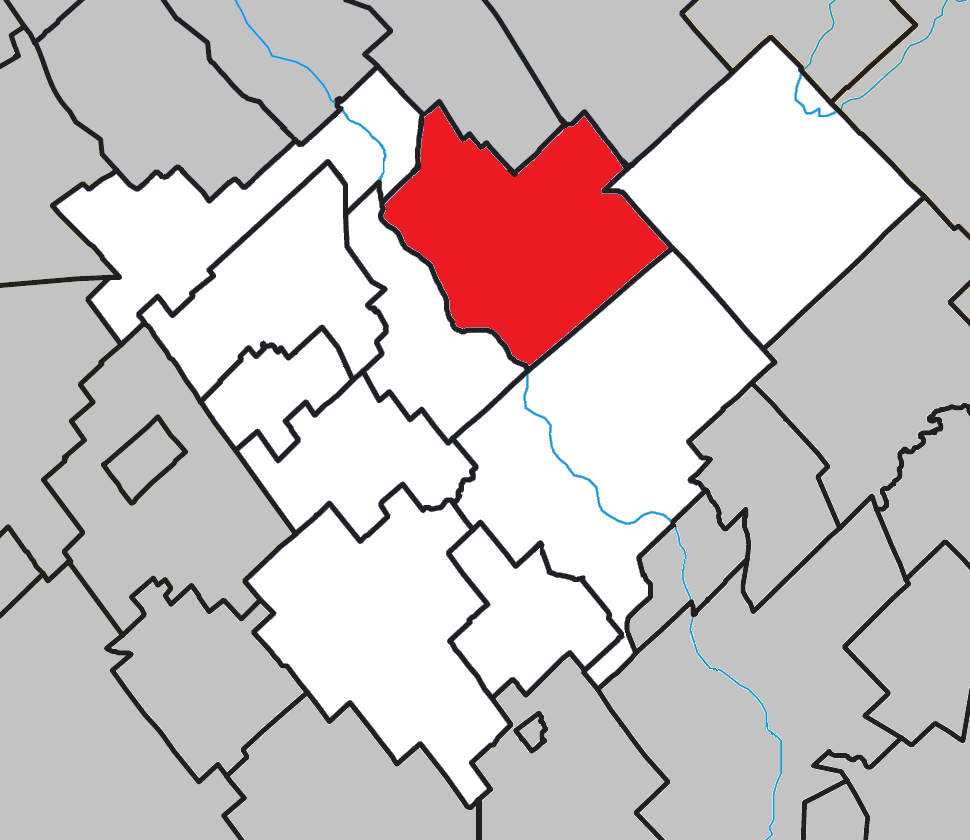
- Location within Beauce-Centre RCM.

- Location in southern Quebec.
- Coordinates: 46°18′N 70°53′W
- Country: Canada
- Province: Quebec
- Region: Chaudière-Appalaches
- RCM: Beauce-Centre
- Constituted: January 27, 1999
- Named for: Saint Joseph

Government
  - Mayor: Gaston Vachon
  - Federal riding: Beauce
  - Prov. riding: Beauce-Nord

Area
  - City: 116.00 km^{2} (44.79 sq mi)
  - Land: 114.70 km^{2} (44.29 sq mi)
  - Urban: 4.30 km^{2} (1.66 sq mi)

Population (2021)
  - City: 5,014
  - Density: 43.7/km^{2} (113/sq mi)
  - Urban: 3,494
  - Urban density: 812.4/km^{2} (2,104/sq mi)
  - Pop 2016-2021: ▲3.2%
  - Dwellings: 2,219
- Time zone: UTC−5 (EST)
  - Summer (DST): UTC−4 (EDT)
- Postal code(s): G0S 2V0
- Area codes: 418 and 581
- Highways A-73: R-173; R-276
- Website: www.ville.saint josephdebeauce.qc.ca

Saint-Joseph-de-Beauce (French pronunciation: [sɛ̃ ʒozɛf də bos]) is a city in the Municipalité régionale de comté Beauce-Centre in Quebec, Canada. It is part of the Chaudière-Appalaches region and the population was 5,014 as of the Canada 2021 Census.

The new city constitution dates from 1999, when the city of Saint-Joseph-de-Beauce and the parish municipality of Saint-Joseph-de-Beauce amalgamated. However, the territory was settled as a seigneurie in 1736 under Pierre de Rigaud de Vaudreuil, which makes it the oldest settlement in Beauce. In 1747, Vaudreuil would exchange it to Joseph de Fleury de La Gorgendière, who would initiate the development of the settlement.

Saint-Joseph-de-Beauce is the seat of the judicial district of Beauce.

Saint-Joseph-de-Beauce holds an annual Truck drag race event, the Accélération de camions à St-Joseph-de-Beauce (Big Rig Drag Racing) which established in 2004. It attracts over 25,000 visitors from all over Canada and much of the United States.

== History ==
The origins of Saint-Joseph-de-Beauce go back to the days of New France, when the seigneury of Saint-Joseph was granted to Pierre Rigaud de Vaudreuil in 1736. However, it was Joseph de Fleury de La Gorgendière that we owe the establishment of a real seigneury, following an exchange with Rigaud. Joseph Fleury settled the first settlers there and then had a flour mill and a chapel built there in 1739. The founding of Saint-Joseph-de-la-Beauce dates back to 1737, making it one of the oldest localities in Beauce. It is also from the first name of Joseph Fleury de la Gorgendière that the name of the city comes.

Saint-Joseph, the first parish of Beauce, was founded in 1736. But it was its designation as the legal capital of Beauce in 1857 that explains the very high number of beautiful buildings for a city of only 5,000 inhabitants. The courthouse brought several notables to settle in the village and accelerated the creation of new businesses. Thanks to this economic prosperity, between 1865 and 1911, recognized architects were called for the construction of a church, a presbytery, a convent, an orphanage and a college. These buildings form an architectural ensemble classified as a historic site since 1985.

It was in 1889 that Saint-Joseph was officially created. The village continued to grow and finally changed its status to became a city in 1965. It is also at this time that Saint-Joseph adopted its current name of Saint-Joseph-de-Beauce.

The public buildings of the village encouraged local notables to build opulent residences in the surrounding streets. The whole forms a housing stock of rare diversity and great wealth, which earned the city the title of cultural capital of Canada in 2006.

== Demographics ==
In the 2021 Census of Population conducted by Statistics Canada, Saint-Joseph-de-Beauce had a population of 5,014 living in 2,130 of its 2,219 total private dwellings, a change of 3.2% from its 2016 population of 4,858. With a land area of 114.7 km^{2} (44.3 sq mi), it had a population density of 43.7/km^{2} (113.2/sq mi) in 2021.

Canada census – Saint-Joseph-de-Beauce community profile

	2021	2016	2011
Population	5,014 (+3.2% from 2016)	4,858 (+2.9% from 2011)	4,722 (+6.0% from 2006)
Land area	114.70 km^{2} (44.29 sq mi)	114.87 km^{2} (44.35 sq mi)	110.87 km^{2} (42.81 sq mi)
Population density	43.7/km^{2} (113/sq mi)	42.3/km^{2} (110/sq mi)	42.6/km^{2} (110/sq mi)
Median age	43.6 (M: 43.2, F: 44.4)	42.8 (M: 42.1, F: 43.6)	42.6 (M: 41.4, F: 44.3)
Private dwellings	2,219 (total)	2,133 (total)	2,020 (total)
Median household income	$71,500	$59,584	$59,596

References: 2021 2016 2011

Population trend:

Census	Population	Change (%)
2021	5,014	▲3.2%
2016	4,858	▲2.9%
2011	4,722	▲6.0%
2006	4,454	▼0.7%
2001	4,487	▲38.5%
1996	3,240	▲3.5%
1991	3,131	▼1.6%
1986	3,183	▼1.0%
1981	3,216	▲0.1%
1976	3,213	▲11.1%
1971	2,893	▲3.1%
1966	2,805	▲12.9%
1961	2,484	0.0%
1956	2,484	▲2.8%
1951	2,417	▲27.7%
1941	1,892	▲16.4%
1931	1,625	▲12.5%
1921	1,445	▲0.3%
1911	1,440	▲28.9%
1901	1,117	▲7.9%
1891	1,035	N/A

== Notable people ==
- Henri Sévérin Béland, doctor, mayor and politician
- Vital Cliche, politician
- Junior Lessard, Deutsche Eishockey Liga player
- Raphaël Lessard, NASCAR driver
- Adrien Ouellette, politician
- Joseph Poirier, politician
- Gabriel-Elzéar Taschereau, seigneur, judge and politician
- Thomas Linière Taschereau, lawyer, mayor and politician
