= Rivière du Moulin (Beauceville) =

River in Chaudière-Appalaches, Quebec, Canada

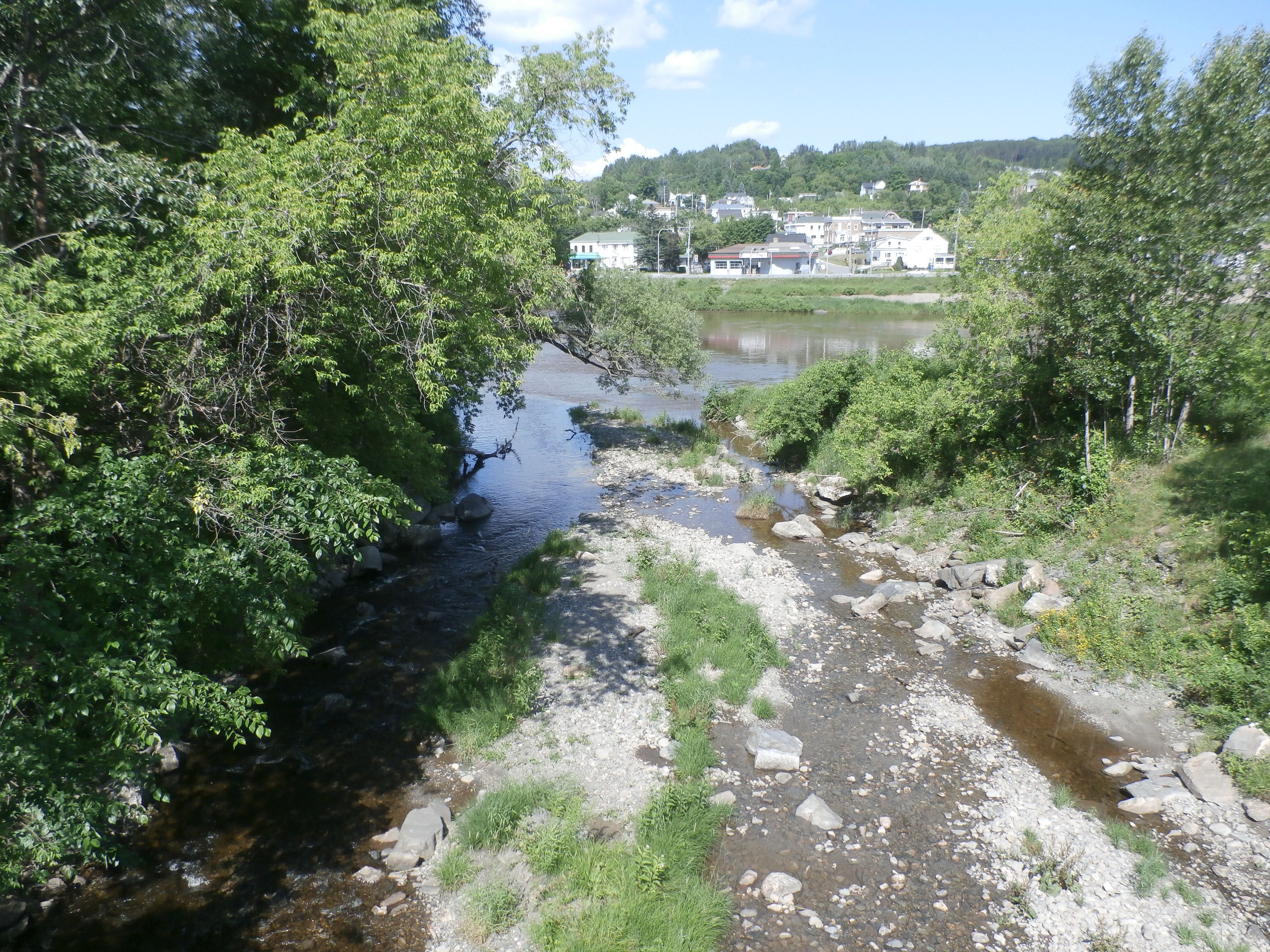
- The Moulin river joining the Chaudière river in Beauceville

- Location within Quebec

Location
- Country: Canada
- Province: Quebec
- Region: Chaudière-Appalaches
- MRC: Robert-Cliche Regional County Municipality,

Physical characteristics
- Source: Forest streams
  - location: Saint-Alfred
  - coordinates: 46.142355°N 70.811645°W
  - elevation: 464 metres (1,522 ft)
- Mouth: Chaudière River
  - location: Saint-Georges
  - coordinates: 46.47083°N 71.05805°W
  - elevation: 249 metres (817 ft)
- Length: 28.4 kilometres (17.6 mi)

Basin features
- River system: St. Lawrence River
- Tributaries
  - left: (upstream) ruisseau des Meules, Noire River, décharge du Lac Fortin
  - right: (upstream) décharge du lac Sartigan

The rivière du Moulin (in English: river of the Mill) is a tributary of the west bank of the Chaudière River which flows northward to empty onto the south bank of the St. Lawrence River. It flows in the municipalities of Saint-Alfred and Beauceville, in the Robert-Cliche Regional County Municipality, in the administrative region of Chaudière-Appalaches, in Quebec, in Canada.

== Geography ==
The main neighboring watersheds of the Moulin river are:

- North side: ruisseau des Meules, Mathieu River, Bras Saint-Victor, Chaudière River;
- east side: Chaudière River;
- south side: Victor-Loubier branch, Fabrique stream, Pozer River;
- west side: Bras Saint-Victor, rivière des Hamel, Prévost-Gilbert River.

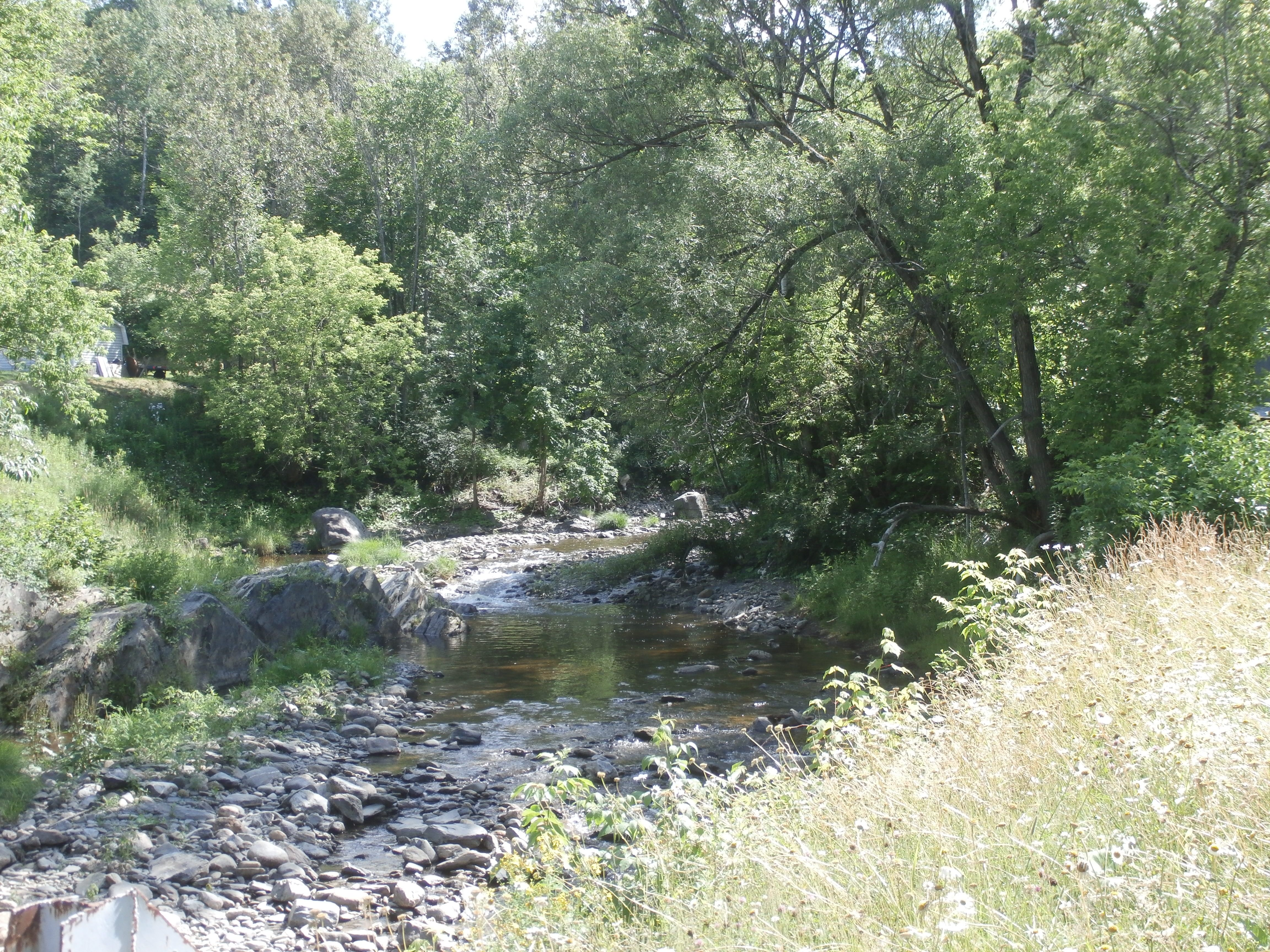
Rivière du Moulin upstream of the avenue Lambert bridge.

The Moulin river has its source at Volet lake (length: 0.8 kilometres (0.50 mi); altitude: 265) which is located in rang Saint-Guillaume de Saint-Alfred. This lake is located at 2.0 kilometres (1.2 mi) south-east of the center of the village of Saint-Alfred, at 6.5 kilometres (4.0 mi) west of the Chaudière River, at 7.1 kilometres (4.4 mi) north of the center of the village of Saint-Benoît-Labre and at 0.6 kilometres (0.37 mi) north of the municipal boundary of Saint-Benoît-Labre (MRC Beauce-Sartigan Regional County Municipality).

Lake Volet is fed by the Bernard stream (coming from the east) and the "discharge of Lake Fortin" (coming from the southwest). Lake Fortin (length: 2.4 kilometres (1.5 mi); altitude of 310 metres (1,020 ft)) is renowned for its vacation; this head lake is located 4.1 kilometres (2.5 mi) southeast of the village of Saint-Victor.

From its source, the Moulin river flows over 8.4 kilometres (5.2 mi) divided into the following segments:

- 1.5 kilometres (0.93 mi) northward, delimiting rang Saint-Guillaume (west side) and rang Clark (east side), to the confluence of the Noire River;
- 2.8 kilometres (1.7 mi) northeasterly, up to the municipal limit between Saint-Alfred and Beauceville;
- 3.0 kilometres (1.9 mi) northward, to the confluence of ruisseau des Meules;
- 1.2 kilometres (0.75 mi) towards the northeast, crossing avenue Lambert which runs along the west bank of the Chaudière River, up to its confluence.

The Moulin river flows on the west bank of the Chaudière River in the municipality of Beauceville. The confluence of the Rivière du Moulin is located 0.7 kilometres (0.43 mi) south of the town of Beauceville bridge and downstream from Île aux Oies.

== Toponymy ==
The toponym Rivière du Moulin was made official on December 5, 1968, at the Commission de toponymie du Québec.

== See also ==
- List of rivers of Quebec
