= Drolet River =

River in Estrie, Quebec (Canada)

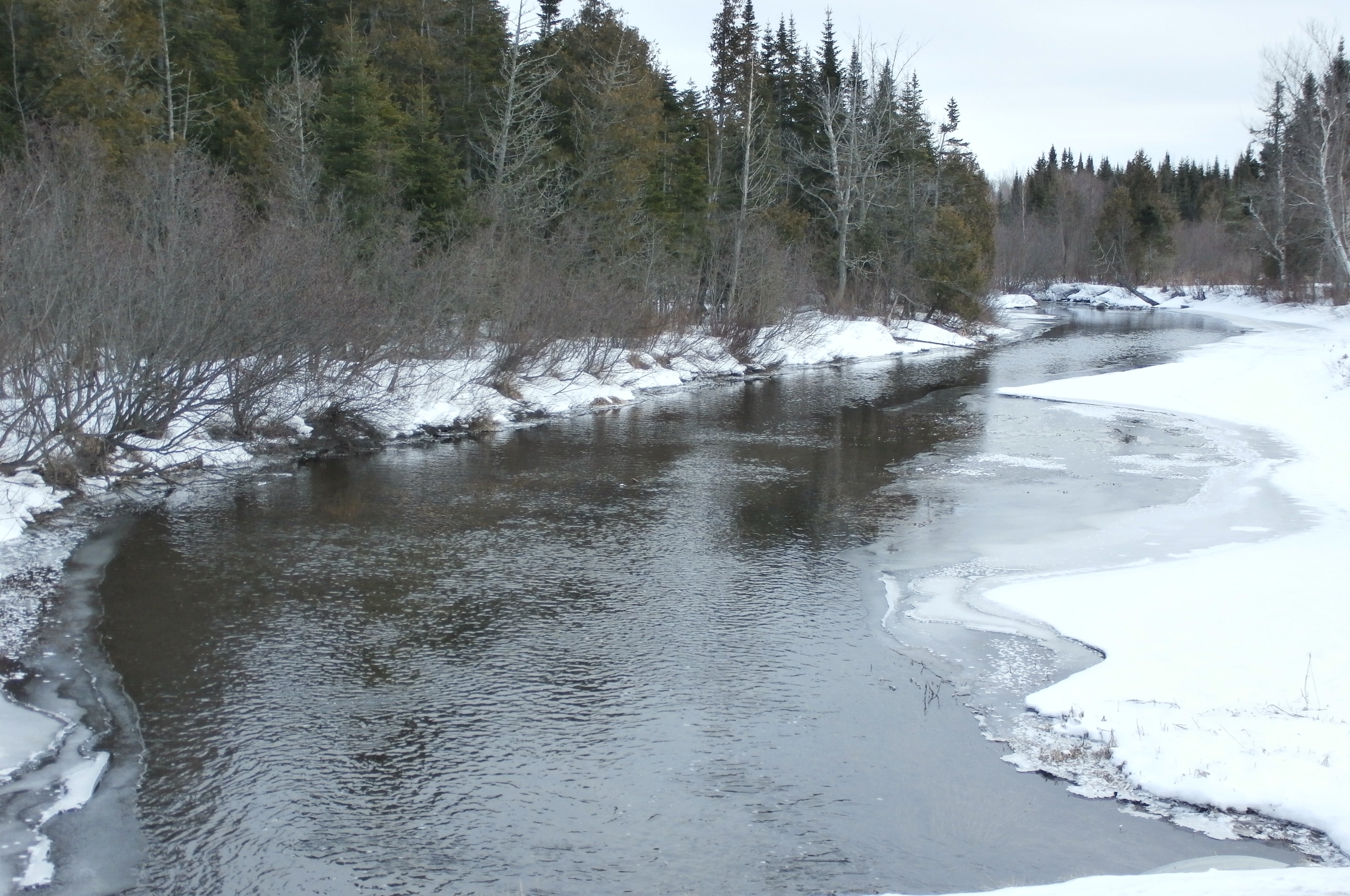
- Drolet River downstream from the Rang 5 bridge to the east.

- Location within Quebec
- Native name: Rivière Drolet (French)

Location
- Country: Canada
- Province: Quebec
- Region: Estrie
- MRC: Le Granit Regional County Municipality

Physical characteristics
- Source: Drolet Lake
  - location: Lac-Drolet
  - coordinates: 45.72857°N 70.858699°W
  - elevation: 460 metres (1,510 ft)
- Mouth: Chaudière River
  - location: Lac-Drolet
  - coordinates: 45.69194°N 70.78667°W
  - elevation: 322 metres (1,056 ft)
- Length: 9.8 kilometres (6.1 mi)

Basin features
- Progression: Chaudière River, St. Lawrence River
- River system: St. Lawrence River
- Tributaries
  - left: (upstream)
  - right: (upstream)

The Drolet River (in French: rivière Drolet) is a tributary of the west bank of the Chaudière River which flows northward to empty onto the south bank of the St. Lawrence River.

The "Drolet River" flows in the municipality of Lac-Drolet, in the Le Granit Regional County Municipality (MRC), in the administrative region of Estrie, in Quebec, in Canada.

== Geography ==
The main hydrographic slopes near the "Drolet river" are:

- north side: Ludgine River, Petit Portage River, rivière de la Grande Coudée;
- east side: Chaudière River;
- south side: Chaudière River, Madisson River;
- west side: Drolet Lake, Lac du Rat Musqué, Rivière aux Bluets Sud.

The Drolet river takes its source at the outlet of Drolet Lake (length: 3.2 kilometres (2.0 mi); altitude: 457 metres (1,499 ft)), in the municipality of Lac-Drolet. This lake is located near the Route des Sommets, this lake has a central island connected to the "Pointe à Bénedict". The resort is developed especially on the southwest shore and the northern part. This lake is located northwest of the village of Lac-Drolet.

From the mouth of Drolet Lake, the Drolet river flows over 9.8 kilometres (6.1 mi) divided into the following segments:

- 2.0 kilometres (1.2 mi) towards the south-west, crossing the village of Lac-Drolet, as far as the road to Le Morne, which it intersects at the south-east exit of the village;
- 7.8 kilometres (4.8 mi) towards the south-west, down to the bottom of a small valley following the route of Le Morne, up to its confluence.

The Drolet River empties on the west bank of the Chaudière River in the municipality of Lac-Drolet in the place called "Puits de Jacob". Its confluence is 0.9 kilometres (0.56 mi) west of route 204, upstream of the bridge in the village of Saint-Ludger and downstream of the intermunicipal boundary between Sainte-Cécile-de-Whitton and Lac-Drolet.

== Toponymy ==
The toponym "rivière Drolet" was made official on December 5, 1968, at the Commission de toponymie du Québec.

== See also ==
- List of rivers of Quebec
