= Ruisseau des Meules =

River in Chaudière-Appalaches, Quebec, Canada

- Location within Quebec

Location
- Country: Canada
- Province: Quebec
- Region: Chaudière-Appalaches
- MRC: Robert-Cliche Regional County Municipality,

Physical characteristics
- Source: Forest and agricultural streams
  - location: Saint-Alfred
  - coordinates: 46.164486°N 70.853887°W
  - elevation: 347 metres (1,138 ft)
- Mouth: Rivière du Moulin
  - location: Saint-Alfred
  - coordinates: 46.19556°N 70.78139°W
  - elevation: 177 metres (581 ft)
- Length: 7.6 kilometres (4.7 mi)

Basin features
- River system: St. Lawrence River
- Tributaries
  - left: (upstream) Ruisseau Toulouse
  - right: (upstream)

The Ruisseau des Meules (in English: millstone stream) is a tributary on the west bank of the rivière du Moulin whose current flows on the west bank of the Chaudière River; the latter flowing northward to empty on the south shore of the St. Lawrence River. It flows in the municipality of Saint-Alfred, in the Robert-Cliche Regional County Municipality, in the administrative region of Chaudière-Appalaches, in Quebec, in Canada.

== Geography ==
The main neighboring watersheds of the Meules stream are:

- north side: Mathieu River, Bras Saint-Victor, Chaudière River;
- east side: Chaudière River, rivière du Moulin;
- south side: Noire River, outlet of Lac Fortin;
- west side: Bras Saint-Victor, rivière du Cinq.

7.6 The Meules stream takes its source at the confluence of two streams in an agricultural zone in the municipality of Saint-Alfred. This headland is located at 4.1 kilometres (2.5 mi) northeast of the center of the village of Saint-Victor, at 1.9 kilometres (1.2 mi) northwest of the center of the village of Saint-Alfred, 4.0 kilometres (2.5 mi) north of Lac Fortin and 7.1 kilometres (4.4 mi) west of Chaudière River.

From its source, the Meules stream flows over 1.0 kilometre (0.62 mi), with a drop of 170 metres (560 ft), divided into the following segments:

- 1.0 kilometre (0.62 mi) east, to a country road;
- 3.0 kilometres (1.9 mi) north-east, to a road on rang Saint-Alexandre-Sud;
- 1.9 kilometres (1.2 mi) north-east, to a country road;
- 1.7 kilometres (1.1 mi) towards the northeast, up to its confluence.

The Meules stream empties on the west bank of the Moulin river, in the municipality of Saint-Alfred. The confluence of the Meules stream is located 1.2 kilometres (0.75 mi) downstream of the confluence of the Moulin river.

== Toponymy ==
The origin of the toponym "Ruisseau des Meules" is linked to the toponym rivière du Moulin by being associated with the molding of the grains. Around 1910, the "Rigaud-Vaudreuil gold fields" made major investments in gold research there.

The toponym "Ruisseau des Meules" was made official on March 6, 1970, at the Commission de toponymie du Québec.

== See also ==
- List of rivers of Quebec
