= Ludgine River =

River in Chaudière-Appalaches, Quebec (Canada)

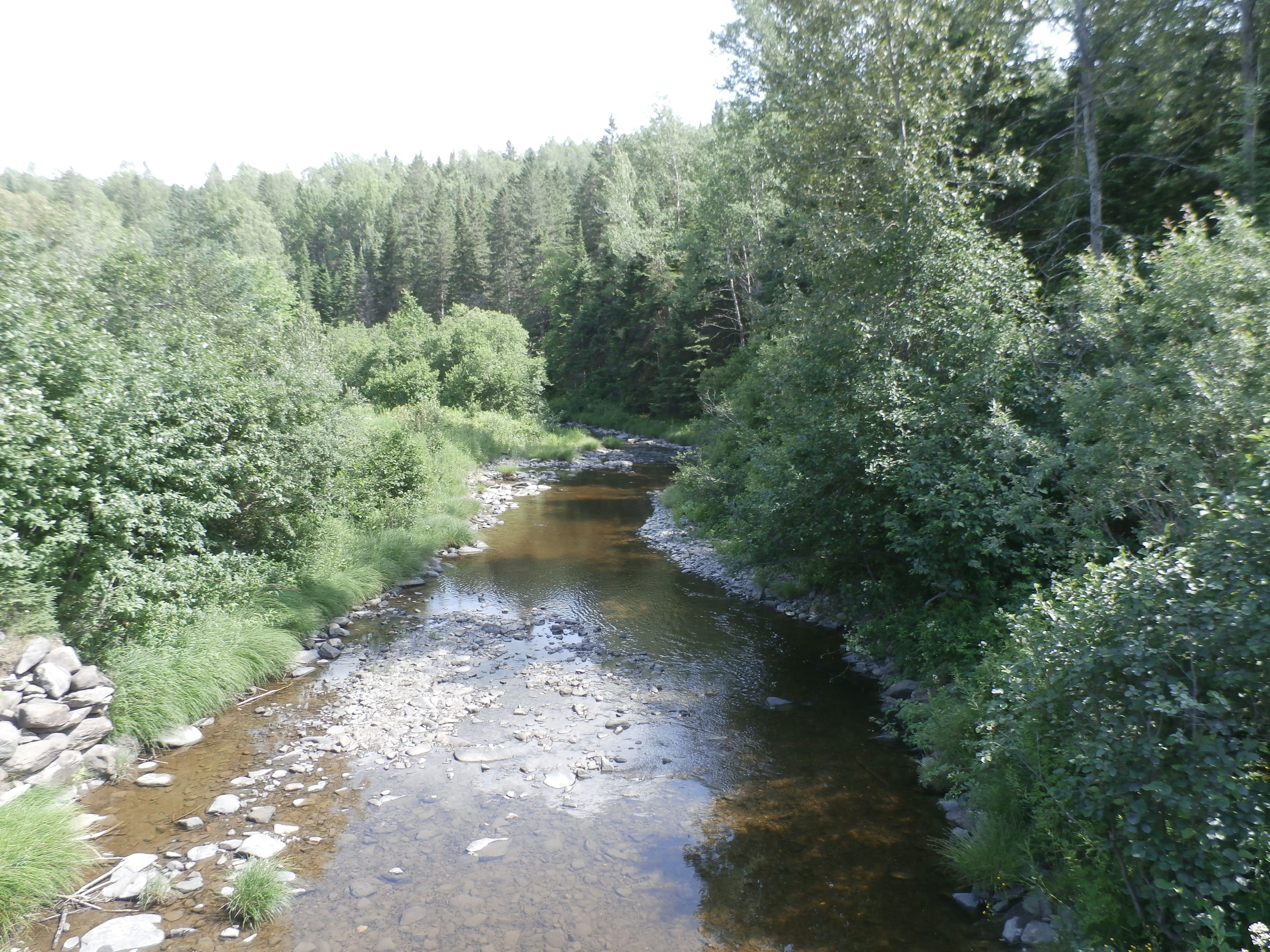
- Rivière Ludgine downstream from Rang Ludgine in Lac-Drolet.

- Location within Quebec
- Native name: Rivière Ludgine (French)

Location
- Country: Canada
- Province: Quebec
- Region: Chaudière-Appalaches
- MRC: Beauce-Sartigan Regional County Municipality, Le Granit Regional County Municipality

Physical characteristics
- Source: Agricultural streams
  - location: Saint-Hilaire-de-Dorset
  - coordinates: 45.800752°N 70.875256°W
  - elevation: 478 metres (1,568 ft)
- Mouth: Chaudière River
  - location: Saint-Ludger
  - coordinates: 45.70917°N 70.75195°W
  - elevation: 315 metres (1,033 ft)
- Length: 15.9 kilometres (9.9 mi)
- Basin size: 60.7 kilometres (37.72 mi)

Basin features
- Progression: Chaudière River, St. Lawrence River
- River system: St. Lawrence River
- Tributaries
  - left: (upstream)
  - right: (upstream)

The Ludgine River (in French: rivière Ludgine) is a tributary of the west bank of the Chaudière River which flows northward to empty onto the south shore of the St. Lawrence River.

The Ludgine River flows through Quebec, Canada, MRC of:

- Beauce-Sartigan Regional County Municipality (administrative region of Chaudière-Appalaches): municipality of Saint-Hilaire-de-Dorset;
- Le Granit Regional County Municipality (administrative region of Estrie): municipalities of Lac-Drolet and Saint-Ludger;

== Geography ==
The main neighboring watersheds of the Ludgine river are:

- north side: Petit Portage River, rivière de la Grande Coudée;
- east side: Chaudière River;
- south side: Chaudière River, Drolet River;
- west side: Drolet Lake, rivière aux Bluets Sud.

The Ludgine river has its source in a mountainous area in the canton of Dorset in the municipality of Saint-Hilaire-de-Dorset. This area is located 1.5 kilometres (0.93 mi) east of the municipality boundary of Saint-Sébastien and 2.1 kilometres (1.3 mi) north of the limit of the municipality of Lac-Drolet.

From its source, the Ludgine River flows on 15.9 kilometres (9.9 mi) divided into the following segments:

- 3.1 kilometres (1.9 mi) south-east, in Saint-Hilaire-de-Dorset, to the municipal limit of Lac-Drolet;
- 3.4 kilometres (2.1 mi) south-east, crossing the seventh rang road and the sixth rang road, to the fifth rang that it cuts at 3.2 kilometres (2.0 mi) northeast of the Drolet River bridge;
- 3.5 kilometres (2.2 mi) towards the south-east, up to the road of Rang Ludgine;
- 2.1 kilometres (1.3 mi) south-east, to the intermunicipal limit of Lac-Drolet and Saint-Ludger;
- 3.8 kilometres (2.4 mi) southeasterly into Saint-Ludger, crossing the township of Gayhurst entirely, to its confluence.

The Ludgine River flows on the west bank of the Chaudière River in the municipality of Saint-Ludger. Its confluence is located 4.7 kilometres (2.9 mi) (or 3.4 kilometres (2.1 mi) in a direct line) downstream from the mouth of the Drolet River and upstream from the bridge of Saint-Ludger.

== Toponymy ==
The term "Ludgine" is a female given name of French origin.

Until recently, maps designated this watercourse under the toponym “Eugenie River”. The term "Ludgine" could be the popular diminutive of "Ludger" or the graphic synthesis of "Ludger" and "Eugenie". Another hypothesis attributes the name of "Ludgine" to an Amerindian named Eugénie, who lived in Rang Ludgine, in Lac-Drolet, near the river. The English pronunciation of the first name would have led to the spelling "Ludgine".

The toponym “Rivière Ludgine” was made official on January 31, 1980, at the Commission de toponymie du Québec.

== See also ==
- List of rivers of Quebec
