= Rivière de la Grande Coudée =

River in Chaudière-Appalaches, Quebec (Canada)

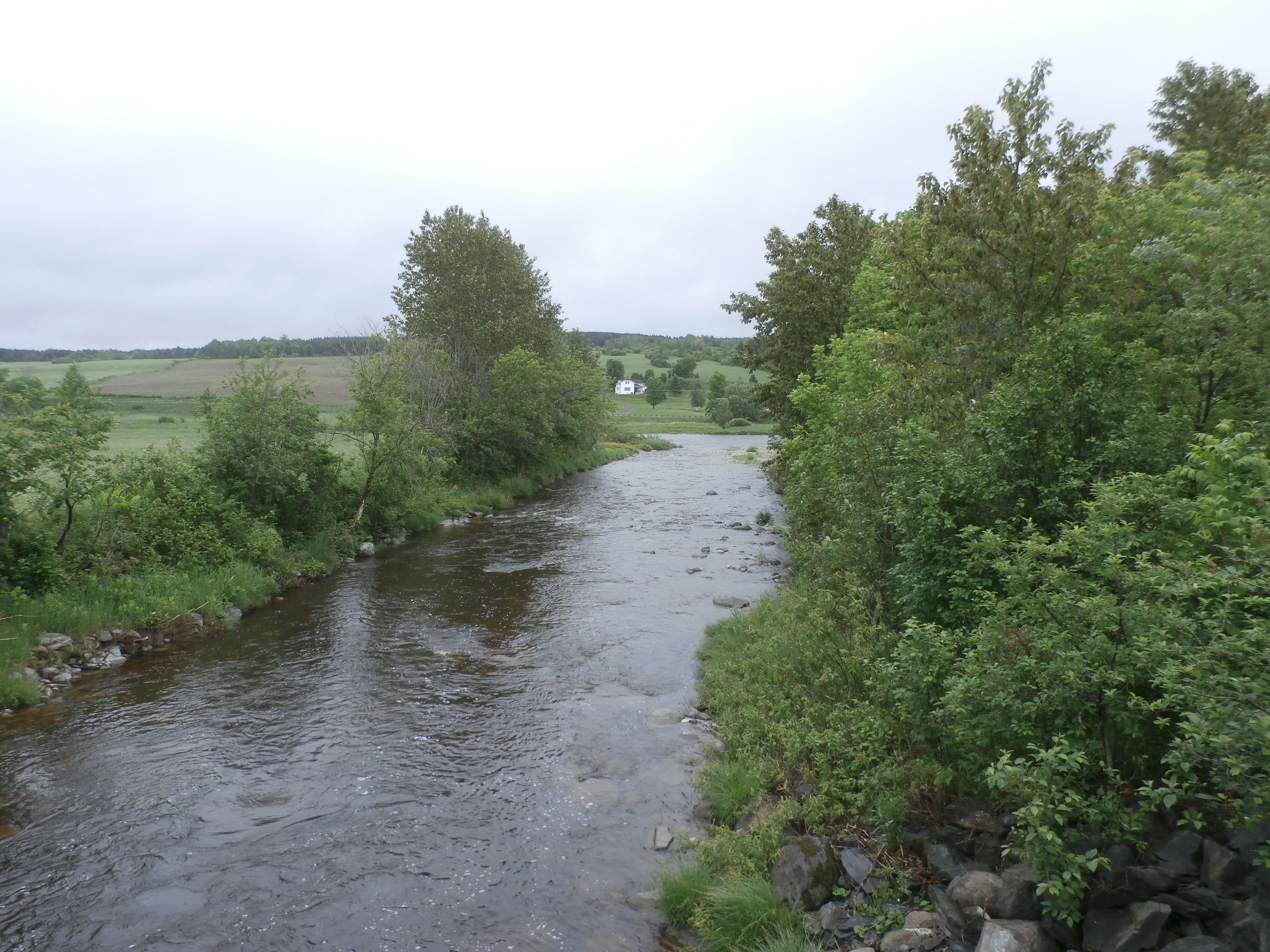
- Rivière de la Grande Coudée towards its confluence with the Chaudière river.

- Location within Quebec

Location
- Country: Canada
- Province: Quebec
- Region: Chaudière-Appalaches
- MRC: Beauce-Sartigan Regional County Municipality

Physical characteristics
- Source: Forest streams
  - location: Saint-Hilaire-de-Dorset
  - coordinates: 45.783254°N 70.772419°W
  - elevation: 428 metres (1,404 ft)
- Mouth: Chaudière River
  - location: Saint-Martin
  - coordinates: 45.93028°N 70.65444°W
  - elevation: 230 metres (750 ft)
- Length: 32.4 kilometres (20.1 mi)

Basin features
- Progression: Chaudière River, St. Lawrence River
- River system: St. Lawrence River
- Tributaries
  - left: (upstream) décharge du Lac des Îles, ruisseau des Cèdres
  - right: (upstream) décharge du Lac des Îles, ruisseau des Cèdres

The rivière de la Grande Coudée (in English: river of the great cub) is a tributary of the west bank of the Chaudière River which flows northward to empty onto the south bank of the St. Lawrence River. It flows in the municipalities of Saint-Hilaire-de-Dorset, Saint-Gédéon-de-Beauce and Saint-Martin, in the Beauce-Sartigan Regional County Municipality, in the administrative region of Chaudière-Appalaches, in Quebec, in Canada.

== Geography ==
The main neighboring watersheds of the Grande Coudée river are:

- north side: Shenley River, Roy brook, Pozer River, Chaudière River;
- east side: Petit Portage River, Chaudière River;
- south side: Petit Portage River, Ludgine River;
- west side: Ludgine River, Rivière aux Bluets.

The Grande Coudée river has its source in a swamp straddling the townships of Dorset and Gayhurst, very close (north side) of the boundary between the Beauce-Sartigan Regional County Municipality (RCM) and Le Granit Regional County Municipality (RCM). Its source is located 7.3 kilometres (4.5 mi) north-west of the bridge in the village of Saint-Ludger, at 7.8 kilometres (4.8 mi) north-east of Drolet Lake, located in the municipality of Lac-Drolet.

From its source, the Grande Coudée river flows over 32.4 kilometres (20.1 mi) divided into the following segments:

- 2.3 kilometres (1.4 mi) towards the north-west, until the outlet of the Oliveira lake;
- 3.8 kilometres (2.4 mi) towards the north-west, collecting water from a stream in the locality "Les Fourches", until the outlet of Lac Rond;
- 6.7 kilometres (4.2 mi) northeasterly, up to the confluence of the Discharge of Lac des Îles;
- 9.0 kilometres (5.6 mi) northeasterly, winding up to the intermunicipal limit between Saint-Hilaire-de-Dorset and Saint-Gédéon-de-Beauce;
- 1.5 kilometres (0.93 mi) northeasterly, winding up to the intermunicipal limit between Saint-Gédéon-de-Beauce and Saint-Martin;
- 5.6 kilometres (3.5 mi) towards the north-east, winding up to the confluence of a stream (coming from the north-west);
- 3.5 kilometres (2.2 mi) eastward, up to its confluence.

The Grande Coudée River empties on the west bank of the Chaudière River at Saint-Martin. Its confluence is 1.4 kilometres (0.87 mi) upstream from the bridge in the village of Saint-Martin and downstream from the village of Saint-Gédéon-de-Beauce.

== Toponymy ==
In history, this watercourse has often been referred to as the “Grande Coulée”, especially since 1937. In other times, this river has been designated “Grande Coudée” by the inhabitants of this sector; and this name has been attested in particular by Vondenvelden and Charland, 1803, and Bouchette, 1832.

The term "flow" popularly denotes a ravine, usually having an intermittent stream. The term "cubit" reflects the geographical particularities of the course of this river. As early as 1860, pioneers settled at the Grande Coudée, i.e. at the mouth of this watercourse. A Catholic mission will be known there under the name of Grandes-Coudées.

The toponym Rivière de la Grande Coudée was made official on October 19, 1990, at the Commission de toponymie du Québec.

== See also ==
- List of rivers of Quebec
