= Shenley River =

River in Chaudière-Appalaches, Quebec (Canada)

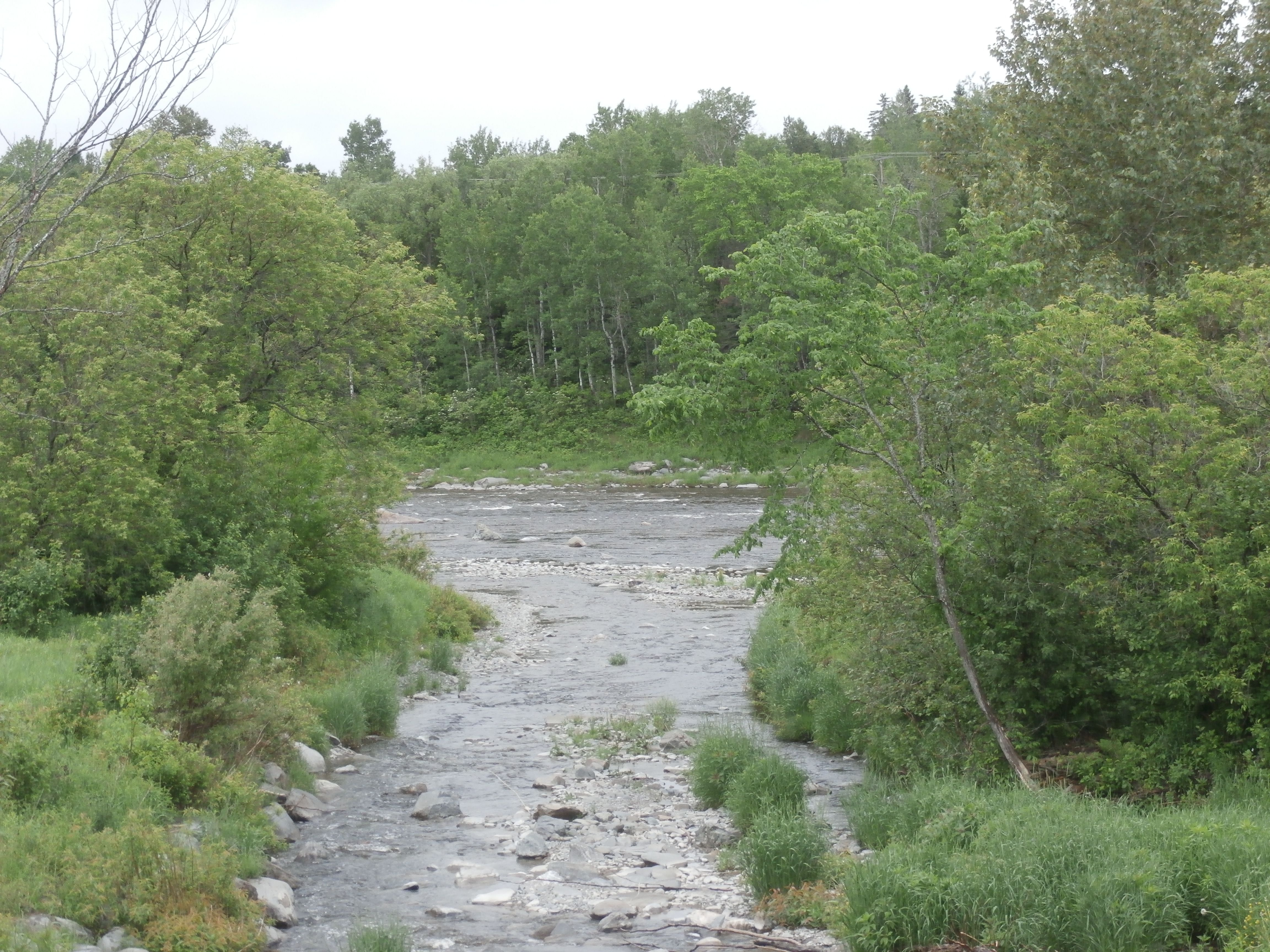
- Shenley River towards the point of confluence with the Chaudière River.

- Location within Quebec
- Native name: Rivière Shenley (French)

Location
- Country: Canada
- Province: Quebec
- Region: Chaudière-Appalaches
- MRC: Beauce-Sartigan Regional County Municipality

Physical characteristics
- Source: Agricultural and forest streams
  - location: Saint-Honoré-de-Shenley
  - coordinates: 45.985585°N 70.794492°W
  - elevation: 438 metres (1,437 ft)
- Mouth: Chaudière River
  - location: Saint-Martin
  - coordinates: 45.94556°N 70.65527°W
  - elevation: 226 metres (741 ft)
- Length: 12.3 kilometres (7.6 mi)

Basin features
- Progression: Chaudière River, St. Lawrence River
- River system: St. Lawrence River
- Tributaries
  - left: (upstream)
  - right: (upstream)

The Shenley River (in French: rivière Shenley) is a tributary of the west bank of the Chaudière River at Saint-Martin which flows northward to empty on the shore south of the St. Lawrence River. It flows in the municipalities of Saint-Honoré-de-Shenley and Saint-Martin, in the Beauce-Sartigan Regional County Municipality, in the administrative region of Chaudière-Appalaches, in Quebec, in Canada.

== Geography ==
The main neighboring watersheds of the Shenley River are:

- north side: Roy brook, Dutil brook, Pozer River, Chaudière River
- east side: Chaudière River
- south side: rivière de la Grande Coudée, Petit Portage River;
- west side: Toinon River, Le Petit Shenley, Bras Saint-Victor.

The Shenley River originates from several tributaries that drain the area south of Vaseux Lake, northeast of the village of Saint-Honoré-de-Shenley. Its source is located 3.6 kilometres (2.2 mi) northeast of the center of the village of Saint-Honoré-de-Shenley 2.5 kilometres (1.6 mi) north of route 269 and south of the center of the village of Saint-Benoît-Labre.

From its source, the Shenley River flows over 12.3 kilometres (7.6 mi) divided into the following segments:

- 0.3 kilometres (0.19 mi) towards the south-east, up to the 4th Rang Nord that it intersects at 2.4 kilometres (1.5 mi) north of route 269;
- 3.5 kilometres (2.2 mi) south-east, to an old country road, which it cuts at 0.9 kilometres (0.56 mi) south of route 269;
- 3.9 kilometres (2.4 mi) southeasterly, to the 2nd Rang de Shenley North;
- 4.6 kilometres (2.9 mi) southeasterly, crossing route 269 and 4th rue West, to its confluence.

The Shenley River empties on the west bank of the Chaudière River at Saint-Martin. Its confluence is 1.4 kilometres (0.87 mi) upstream from the bridge in the village of Saint-Martin and downstream from the village of Saint-Gédéon-de-Beauce.

== Toponymy ==
The toponym "Shenley River" was formalized on December 5, 1968 at the Commission de toponymie du Québec.

== See also ==
- List of rivers of Quebec
