= Noire River (rivière du Moulin tributary) =

River in Chaudière-Appalaches, Quebec (Canada)

- Location within Quebec
- Native name: Rivière Noire (French)

Location
- Country: Canada
- Province: Quebec
- Region: Chaudière-Appalaches
- MRC: Robert-Cliche Regional County Municipality,

Physical characteristics
- Source: Forest and agricultural streams
  - location: Saint-Alfred
  - coordinates: 46.139608°N 70.854848°W
  - elevation: 300 metres (980 ft)
- Mouth: Rivière du Moulin
  - location: Saint-Alfred
  - coordinates: 46.15194°N 70.80944°W
  - elevation: 262 metres (860 ft)
- Length: 4.1 kilometres (2.5 mi)

Basin features
- River system: St. Lawrence River
- Tributaries
  - left: (upstream) Ruisseau de la Bleue
  - right: (upstream)

The 'Noire River (in French: rivière Noire) is a tributary of the west bank of the rivière du Moulin whose current flows on the west bank of the Chaudière River; the latter flowing northward to empty on the south shore of the St. Lawrence River. It flows in the municipality of Saint-Alfred, in the Robert-Cliche Regional County Municipality, in the administrative region of Chaudière-Appalaches, in Quebec, in Canada.

== Geography ==
The main neighboring watersheds of the Black River are:

- north side: ruisseau des Meules, Mathieu River, Bras Saint-Victor, Chaudière River;
- east side: Chaudière River, rivière du Moulin;
- south side: Lac Fortin outlet, Victor-Loubier branch, Breton stream, Fabrique stream, Pozer River;
- west side: Bras Saint-Victor, rivière du Cinq, Prévost-Gilbert River.

The Rivière Noire takes its source at the confluence of two streams in an agricultural zone in the municipality of Saint-Alfred. This head zone is located at 3.7 kilometres (2.3 mi) east of the center of the village of Saint-Victor, at 2.6 kilometres (1.6 mi) west of the village center of Saint-Alfred and 2.7 kilometres (1.7 mi) northeast of Lac Fortin and 10.4 kilometres (6.5 mi) west of the Chaudière River.

From its source, the Black River flows on 4.1 kilometres (2.5 mi) divided into the following segments:

- 0.3 kilometres (0.19 mi) north-east, up to the first rang road;
- 2.6 kilometres (1.6 mi) north-east, crossing the rang Sainte-Marie road, to a country road;
- 1.2 kilometres (0.75 mi) heading east, crossing a country road, to its confluence.

The Rivière Noire empties on the west bank of the rivière du Moulin in rang Saint-Alexandre-Sud, in the municipality of Saint-Alfred. The confluence of the Rivière du Moulin is located 1.6 kilometres (0.99 mi) downstream from Lac Volet (source of the Rivière du Moulin (Beauceville) and downstream from the confluence of rivière des Meules.

== Toponymy ==
The toponym Rivière Noire was formalized on February 18, 1977, at the Commission de toponymie du Québec.

== See also ==
- List of rivers of Quebec
