= Lac-des-Îles =

Lac-des-Îles may refer to:

- Lac des Îles (Beauce-Sartigan), lake in the region of Chaudière-Appalaches, Quebec, Canada
- Lac-des-Îles, Quebec, lake in the Laurentides region of Quebec
- Lac des Îles igneous complex, layered gabbroic intrusion in northwestern Ontario, Canada
- Lac des Îles (Saskatchewan), a lake in north-western Saskatchewan, Canada
