= Saint Alfred =

Saint Alfred may refer to:

- Saint-Alfred, Quebec, municipality in Canada
- Alfred the Great (846-899), English king venerated as a saint in some Christian traditions

== See also ==
- St Alfred Street, former name of Alfred Street in Oxford, England
