= Jolicoeur =

Jolicoeur is a surname. Notable people with the surname include:

- Aubelin Jolicoeur (1925–2005), Haitian journalist who frequented Haïti's Hotel Oloffson for 40 years
- Barnabe Jolicoeur (born 1966), former Mauritian sprinter at the 1996 Summer Olympics
- David Jude Jolicoeur (1968–2023), American rapper, producer, and one third of groundbreaking hip hop trio De La Soul
- Nicole Jolicoeur (born 1947), Québécois artist
- Paul Jolicoeur (born 1945), Québécois professor and doctor
- Robert Jolicoeur (born 1948), Canadian landscape architect, designer of FEI international equestrian show jumping courses

== People with the surname Joli-Coeur ==
- Claude Joli-Coeur, administrator of the National Film Board
- Jacques Joli-Cœur, Québécois politician

== See also ==
- Jolicoeur (Montreal Metro), station on the Green Line of the Montreal Metro rapid transit system
- JellyCar
- Jolie Kerr
- Julie Carr
