= Lac des Îles (Beauce-Sartigan) =

Lake in Chaudière-Appalaches, Quebec (Canada)

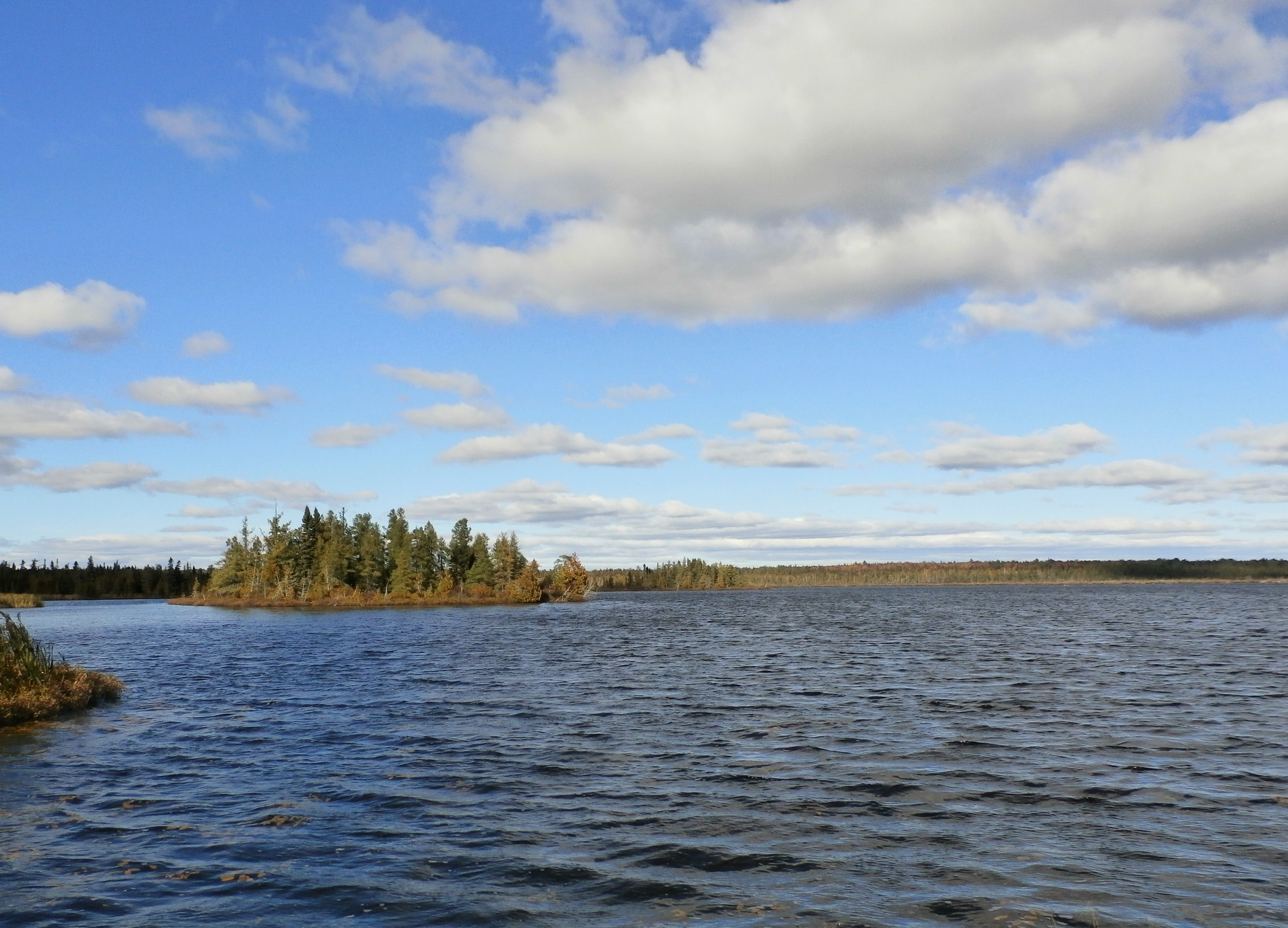
- Lac des Îles near the village of Saint-Hilaire-de-Dorset

- Location in Quebec
- Location: Beauce-Sartigan Regional County Municipality, Chaudière-Appalaches, Quebec, Canada
- Coordinates: 45.894°N 70.841°W
- Primary inflows: Discharge of "Lac de la Beurrerie" and two streams.
- Primary outflows: Rivière de la Grande Coudée (via the discharge of "Lac des Îles"
- Max. length: 2.75 kilometres (1.71 mi)
- Max. width: .75 kilometres (0.47 mi)
- Surface elevation: 420 metres (1,380 ft)
- Frozen: Frozen generally from mid-December to mid-March

The Lac des Îles (in English: lake of islands), also called Lac Grande Coudée is a lake located near the village of Saint-Hilaire-de-Dorset, in Beauce-Sartigan Regional County Municipality (MRC), in the administrative region of Chaudière-Appalaches, in Quebec, in Canada.

== Geography ==
Its area is approximately 2 square kilometres (0.77 sq mi), its altitude of 420 metres (1,380 ft). This lake is surrounded by forest.

The discharge from the lake joins the Rivière de la Grande Coudée, near Saint-Martin. The discharge from the lake joins the Rivière de la Grande Coudée, near Saint-Martin, and is a tributary of the Chaudière River, therefore a sub-tributary of St. Lawrence River.

== Tourism ==
Camping, fishing, kayaking and various outdoor activities are accessible near the lake and its surrounding area in a natural environment.

== Toponymy ==
The toponym "Lac des Îles" was made official on January 31, 1980, at the Commission de toponymie du Québec.

== See also ==
- Beauce-Sartigan Regional County Municipality (MRC)
