= Rivière des Hamel =

River in Chaudière-Appalaches, Quebec (Canada)

- Location within Quebec

Location
- Country: Canada
- Province: Quebec
- Region: Chaudière-Appalaches
- MRC: Les Appalaches Regional County Municipality

Physical characteristics
- Source: Forest streams
  - location: Thetford Mines
  - coordinates: 45.988033°N 71.027478°W
  - elevation: 385 metres (1,263 ft)
- Mouth: Bras Saint-Victor
  - location: Saint-Éphrem-de-Beauce
  - coordinates: 46.075°N 70.91306°W
  - elevation: 213 metres (699 ft)
- Length: 20.2 kilometres (12.6 mi)

Basin features
- Progression: Bras Saint-Victor, Chaudière River, St. Lawrence River
- River system: St. Lawrence River
- Tributaries
  - left: (upstream) ruisseau Dubreuil, ruisseau Tardif Bizier
  - right: (upstream) ruisseau Marois

The rivière des Hamel (in English: Hamel River) is a tributary of the west bank of Bras Saint-Victor which flows into the Chaudière River; the latter flows northward to empty on the south shore of the St. Lawrence River. It flows in the municipalities of Courcelles-Saint-Évariste, Adstock (Sainte-Method-de-Frontenac sector) and Saint-Éphrem-de-Beauce, in the administrative region of Chaudière-Appalaches, in Quebec, in Canada.

== Geography ==
The main neighboring watersheds of the Hamel river are:

- north side: Prévost-Gilbert River, Noire River;
- east side: Bras Saint-Victor, Fabrique stream, Pozer River, Chaudière River;
- south side: Bras Saint-Victor, Bernard stream, Vaseux stream;
- west side: Tardif-Bizier stream, Fortin-Dupuis River, Muskrat river, Petite rivière Muskrat.

The Hamel river has its source on the north side of the route du lac aux Grelots, at 2.1 kilometres (1.3 mi) northeast of lac aux Grelots, in the municipality of Courcelles-Saint-Évariste.

From its source, the Hamel river flows over 20.2 kilometres (12.6 mi) divided into the following segments:

- 1.0 kilometre (0.62 mi) northeasterly, up to the limit between Courcelles-Saint-Évariste and Adstock ("Sainte-Méthode-de-Frontenac" sector);
- 1.3 kilometres (0.81 mi) north-east, up to the tenth rang road;
- 1.6 kilometres (0.99 mi) northeasterly, up to the limit of Saint-Éphrem-de-Beauce;
- 1.4 kilometres (0.87 mi) north, up to the limit of Adstock (Sainte-Method-de-Frontenac sector);
- 0.9 kilometres (0.56 mi) north, up to route 269;
- 1.4 kilometres (0.87 mi) north, up to the municipal limit of Saint-Éphrem-de-Beauce;
- 4.0 kilometres (2.5 mi) north-east, crossing the road from tenth rang to 1.5 kilometres (0.93 mi) west of the center of the village of Saint-Éphrem-de-Beauce;
- 2.7 kilometres (1.7 mi) north-east, to route 271 which it intersects at 1.4 kilometres (0.87 mi) to the north-west from the center of the village of Saint-Éphrem-de-Beauce;
- 1.4 kilometres (0.87 mi) north-east, up to route 108 which it intersects at 1.6 kilometres (0.99 mi) north of the center the village of Saint-Éphrem-de-Beauce;
- 3.5 kilometres (2.2 mi) eastward, up to a bridge on the seventh rang South road;
- 1.0 kilometre (0.62 mi) towards the northeast, up to its confluence.

The Hamel river "flows on the west bank of the Bras Saint-Victor in the municipality of Saint-Éphrem-de-Beauce. This last river flows into the Chaudière River in Beauceville. The confluence of the Hamel river is located 1.7 kilometres (1.1 mi) north of the hamlet "Saint-Éphrem-Station" and 3.7 kilometres (2.3 mi) at the east of the village center of Saint-Éphrem-de-Beauce.

== Toponymy ==
The toponym Rivière des Hamel was made official on May 29, 1980, at the Commission de toponymie du Québec.

== See also ==
- List of rivers of Quebec
