= Lac du Rat Musqué =

Lake in Estrie, Quebec (Canada)

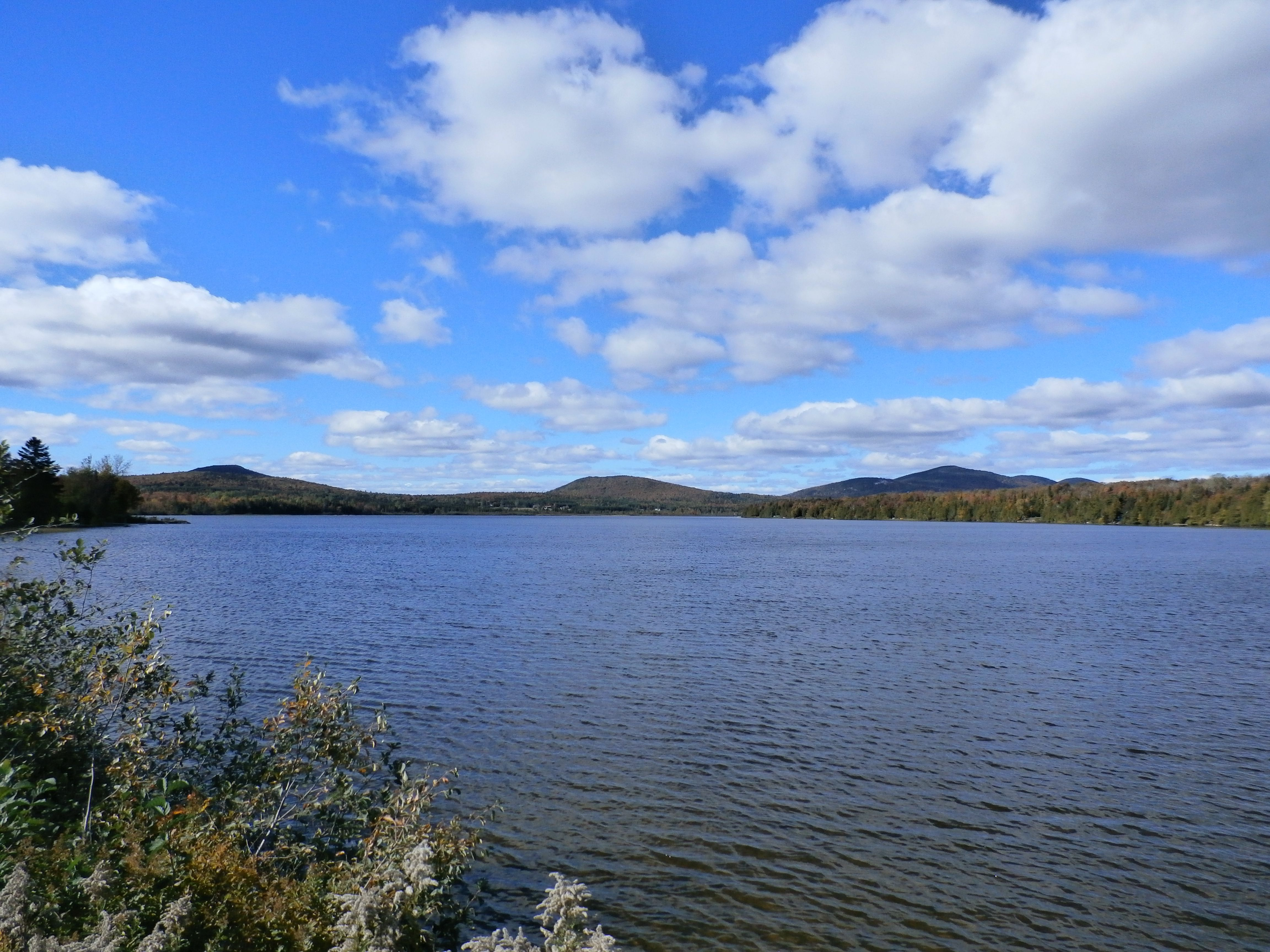
- View of Lac du Rat Musqué

- Location within Quebec
- Location: Le Granit Regional County Municipality, Estrie, Quebec, Canada
- Coordinates: 45.610833°N 70.90984°W
- Primary inflows: Madisson River
- Primary outflows: Madisson River
- Max. length: 2.58 kilometres (1.60 mi)
- Max. width: 1.0 kilometre (0.62 mi)
- Surface area: 1.1 kilometres (0.68 mi)
- Surface elevation: 480 metres (1,570 ft)

The Lac du Rat Musqué is a lake located between the municipalities of Sainte-Cécile-de-Whitton and Lac-Drolet, Le Granit Regional County Municipality, in Estrie, in Quebec, Canada. It is the source of the Madisson River, a tributary of the Chaudière River and a sub-tributary of the St. Lawrence River.

== Geography ==
Its area is 270 acres (110 ha) and its altitude is 480 metres (1,570 ft). The lake contains speckled trout among other species.

== History ==
Around the 18th century, Anishinabeg lived around the lake, where they mainly cultivated corn. Between 1850 and 1900 a railway passed near the lake, so a community that could develop there was founded around the lake. In 2010 recreational activities took place on and around the lake.

== Tourism ==
Located near the Route des Sommets, in a location surrounded by nature and mountains, the area is ideal for hiking, camping, and outdoor activities.
