= William Chapman (poet) =

Canadian poet

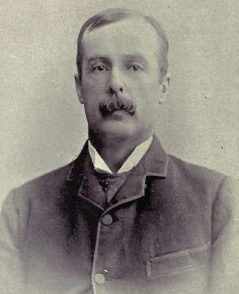
- Born: George William Alphred Chapman; December 13, 1850; Saint-François parish (in Beauceville), Lower Canada
- Died: February 23, 1917 (aged 66); Ottawa, Ontario, Canada
- Resting place: Notre Dame des Neiges Cemetery
- Writing career
- Genre: Poetry

George William Albert Chapman, né George William Alphred (13 December 1850 – 23 February 1917), was a Canadian poet.

Chapman was born at Saint-François-de-Beauce, Quebec (today's Beauceville), and was educated at Levis College in 1862–1867. He studied law, afterward engaged in commercial pursuits, and later entered the civil service of the Province of Quebec. Chapman worked for some time as a journalist in Quebec City and Montreal; but in 1902 became a French translator for the Dominion Senate and removed to Ottawa, Ontario.

After his death in 1917, he was entombed at the Notre Dame des Neiges Cemetery in Montreal.

== Selected bibliography ==
- Les Québécoises (1876)
- Mines d'or de la Beauce (1881)
- Guide et souvenir de la St-Jean-Baptiste (1884), Montréal
- Les Feuilles d'érable (1890)
- Le lauréat (1894)
- Les deux Copains (1894)
- Les aspirations : poésies canadiennes (1904), which received the highest prize of the Académie française
- Les Rayons du Nord (1910), which also gained the highest prize of the Académie française
- Les Fleurs de givre (1912)
