= Madisson River =

River in Estrie, Quebec (Canada)

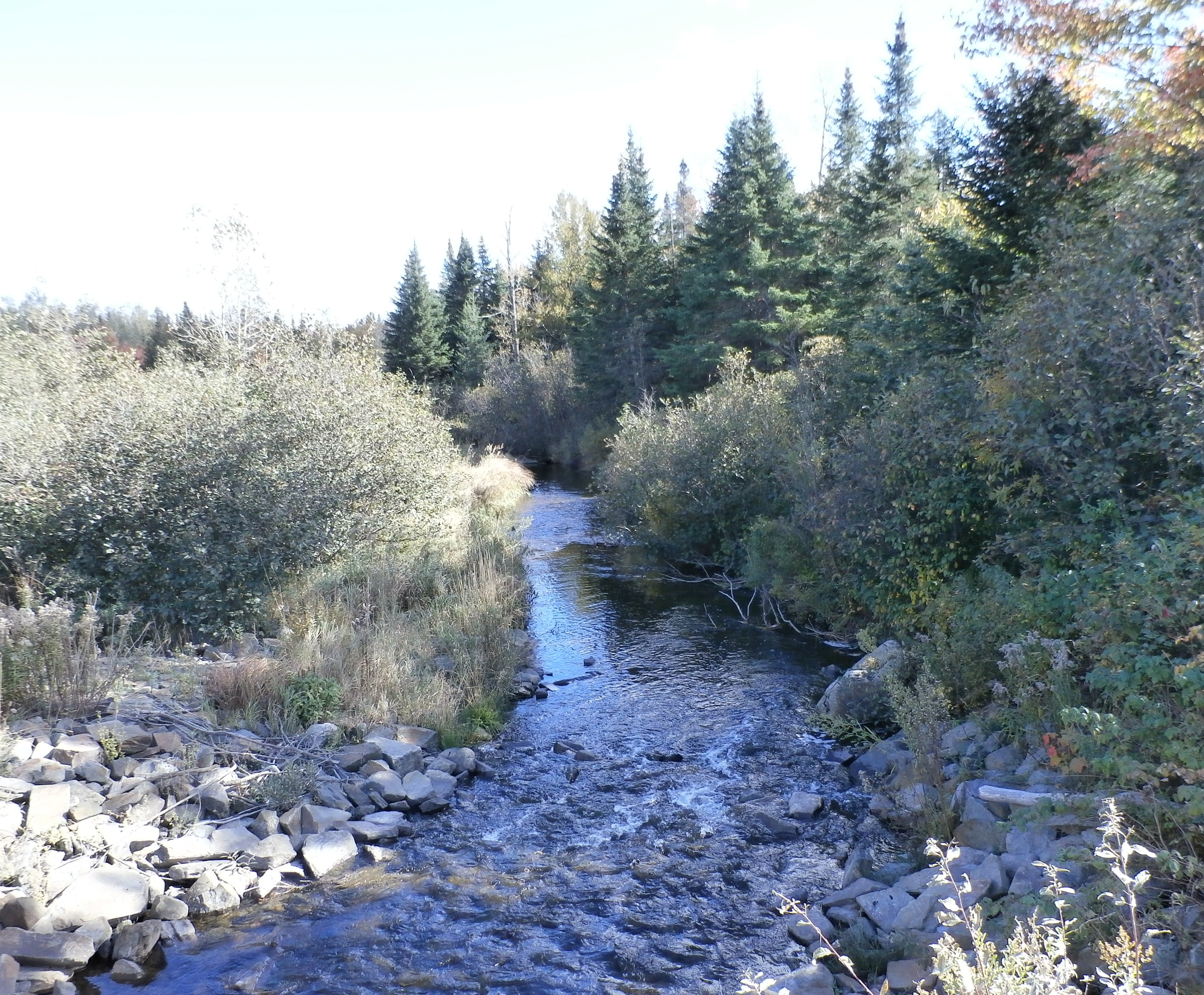
- Rivière Madisson près du lac du Rat Musqué vers la rivière Chaudière.

- Location within Quebec
- Native name: Rivière Madisson (French)

Location
- Country: Canada
- Province: Quebec
- Region: Estrie
- MRC: Le Granit Regional County Municipality

Physical characteristics
- Source: Lac du Rat Musqué (designated "Rancio Lake")
  - location: Sainte-Cécile-de-Whitton
  - coordinates: 45.71222°N 70.90361°W
  - elevation: 477 metres (1,565 ft)
- Mouth: Chaudière River
  - location: Sainte-Cécile-de-Whitton
  - coordinates: 45.64555°N 70.81194°W
  - elevation: 349 metres (1,145 ft)
- Length: 58.1 kilometres (36.1 mi)

Basin features
- Progression: Chaudière River, St. Lawrence River
- River system: St. Lawrence River
- Tributaries
  - left: (upstream)
  - right: (upstream) Décharge du Lac Trois Milles

The Madisson River (in French: rivière Madisson) is a tributary of the west bank of the Chaudière River which flows northward to empty on the south bank of the St. Lawrence River.

The Madisson River flows in the municipalities of Lac-Drolet and Sainte-Cécile-de-Whitton, in the Le Granit Regional County Municipality, in the administrative region of Estrie, Québec, Canada.

== Toponymy ==
The Madisson River toponym was formalized on March 6, 1970, at the Commission de toponymie du Québec.

== See also ==
- List of rivers of Quebec
