= Woodstock en Beauce =

Woodstock en Beauce was a yearly weekend-long music festival held in St-Ephrem-de-Beauce, Quebec, Canada. It was created in 1995 with the intention to re-create the atmosphere of the original Woodstock Festival in 1969, emphasizing on the atmosphere of peace and fun. The first edition of the festival attracted about 5,000 people, but it now attracts crowds of over 78,000 people. It has been nominated three times at the ADISQ awards in the category for the event of the year.

On October 17, 2014, it was announced that the 2014 edition would be the final one, putting an end to the festival after 20 years.

On February 19, 2015, it was revealed on their Facebook page that the music festival would make a comeback in 2016, but there would be no festival in 2015, making it the first year since the foundation of the event to be skipped.

== Notable Performers ==
The Offspring, The Tragically Hip, Hollywood Undead, Good Charlotte, The Planet Smashers, Heart, Joe Cocker, Simple Plan, Roger Hodgson, Cheap Trick, Foreigner, Sum 41, Pennywise, Bad Religion, Joan Jett, Violent Femmes, Sam Roberts, Finger Eleven, Shinedown, The Trews, Our Lady Peace, Bachman–Turner Overdrive, Three Doors Down, The Tea Party, Moist, Creedence Clearwater Revisited, Nickelback, April Wine, Éric Lapointe, Jean Leloup, Richard Desjardins, Daniel Bélanger, les Colocs, Zachary Richard, Les Cowboys Fringants and Limp Bizkit.
