= Pozer River =

River in Chaudière-Appalaches, Quebec (Canada)

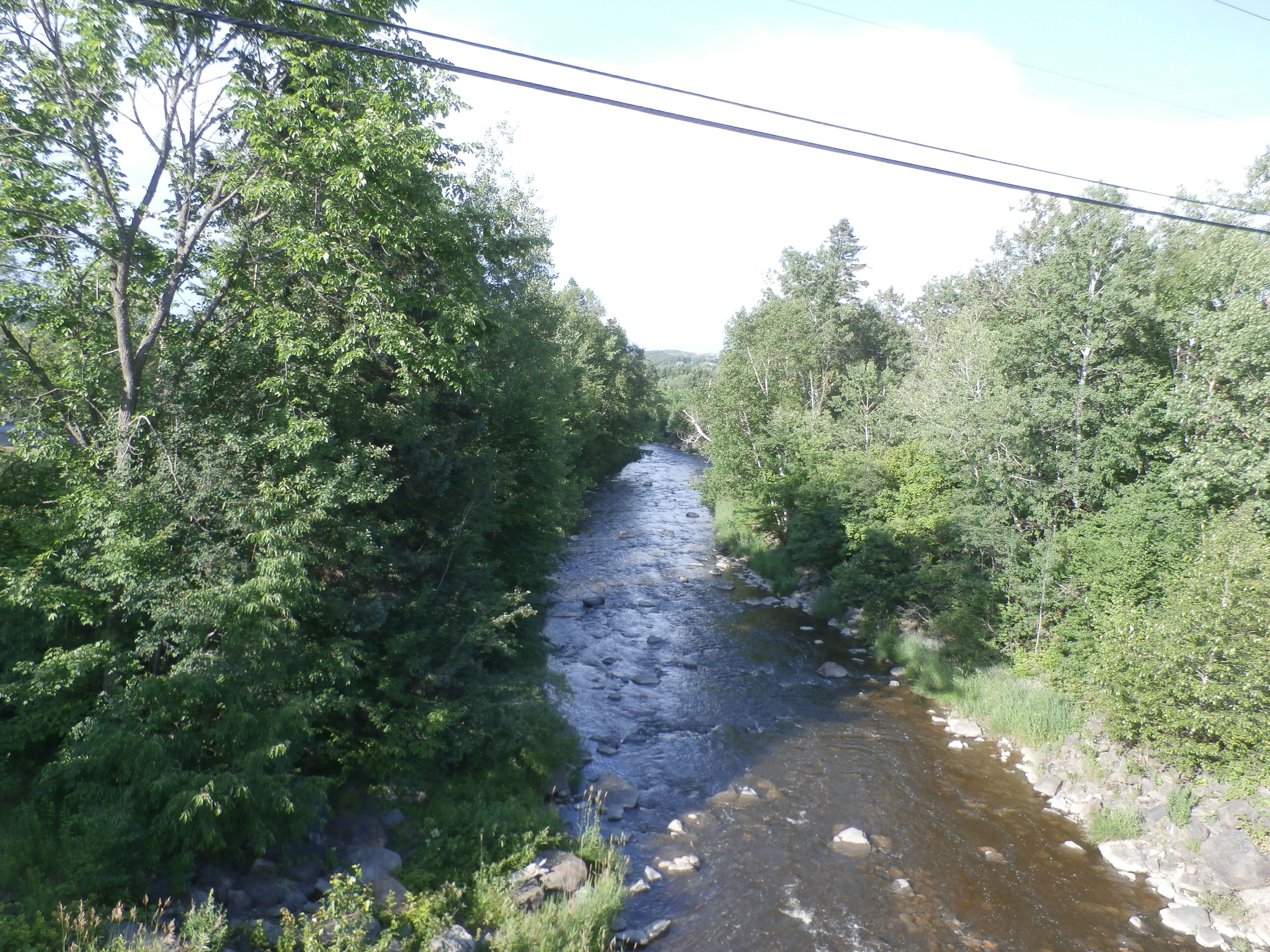
- Pozer River seen from the Highway 271 bridge downstream.

- Location within Quebec
- Native name: Rivière Pozer (French)

Location
- Country: Canada
- Province: Quebec
- Region: Chaudière-Appalaches
- MRC: Beauce-Sartigan Regional County Municipality,

Physical characteristics
- Source: Agricultural and forest streams
  - location: Saint-Honoré-de-Shenley
  - coordinates: 46.009366°N 70.861461°W
  - elevation: 308 metres (1,010 ft)
- Mouth: Chaudière River
  - location: Saint-Georges
  - coordinates: 46.05783°N 70.69928°W
  - elevation: 160 metres (520 ft)
- Length: 26.9 kilometres (16.7 mi)

Basin features
- River system: St. Lawrence River
- Tributaries
  - left: (upstream) ruisseau à Tomiche, ruisseau de la Fabrique, ruisseau Busque, ruisseau Gédéon-Loubier, ruisseau Breton, ruisseau Victor-Loubier, ruisseau Sainte-Anne
  - right: (upstream) ruisseau Labbé, ruisseau Fleury, ruisseau Veilleux, ruisseau de la Ceinture, ruisseau Giroux, ruisseau Georges-Beaudoin, ruisseau Émile-Patry

The Pozer River (in French: rivière Pozer) is a river that originates in Shenley Township and flows into the Chaudière River at Saint-Georges. The latter flows northward to empty onto the south shore of the St. Lawrence River. It flows in the municipalities of Saint-Honoré-de-Shenley, Saint-Benoit-Labre and Saint-Georges (Aubert-Gallion sector), in the Beauce-Sartigan Regional County Municipality, in the administrative region of Chaudière-Appalaches, in Quebec, in Canada.

== Geography ==
The main neighboring watersheds of the Pozer river are:

- north side: Fabrique stream, Chaudière River;
- east side: Chaudière River;
- south side: Roy brook, Toinon River, rivière de la Grande Coudée;
- west side: Bras Saint-Victor, rivière des Hamel.

The Pozer River takes its sources from several tributaries that drain lakes Saint-Charles, Poulin and Raquette as well as the northern part of the township of Shenley. Its source is located at 7.7 kilometres (4.8 mi) northeast of the center of the village of La Guadeloupe, at 5.6 kilometres (3.5 mi) north of the center of the village of Saint-Honoré-de-Shenley and 8.7 kilometres (5.4 mi) southeast of the center of the village of Saint-Éphrem-de-Tring.

From its source, the Pozer River flows on 26.9 kilometres (16.7 mi) divided into the following segments:

- 5.9 kilometres (3.7 mi) towards the northeast, cutting on 0.5 kilometres (0.31 mi) the southeast part of the municipality of Saint-Éphrem-de-Beauce, up to a country road;
- 3.8 kilometres (2.4 mi) towards the northeast, collecting water from the Tomiche stream (coming from the north), to a country road, which it cuts at 2.7 kilometres (1.7 mi) south of the village of Saint-Benoît-Labre;
- 1.7 kilometres (1.1 mi) north-east, to a country road;
- 6.3 kilometres (3.9 mi) northeasterly, up to the limit between Saint-Benoit-Labre and Saint-Georges;
- 1.1 kilometres (0.68 mi) north-east, to a country road;
- 3.9 kilometres (2.4 mi) towards the northeast, zigzagging and forming a loop towards the north, until 30th avenue;
- 3.1 kilometres (1.9 mi) north-east, crossing "Les Sept Chutes" and "Parc des Sept Chutes", on the south side of Domaine Pozer, to route 271;
- 1.1 kilometres (0.68 mi) northward, in the western part of Domaine Pozer (residential estate) north of the west shore area in Saint-Georges, until its confluence.

Its winding course extends for approximately 25 kilometres (16 mi) in a northeast direction, crosses the municipality of Saint-Benoît-Labre, the former municipality of Aubert-Gallion, flows into the Parc des Sept-Chutes, up to its confluence with the Chaudière River at Saint-Georges.

== Toponymy ==
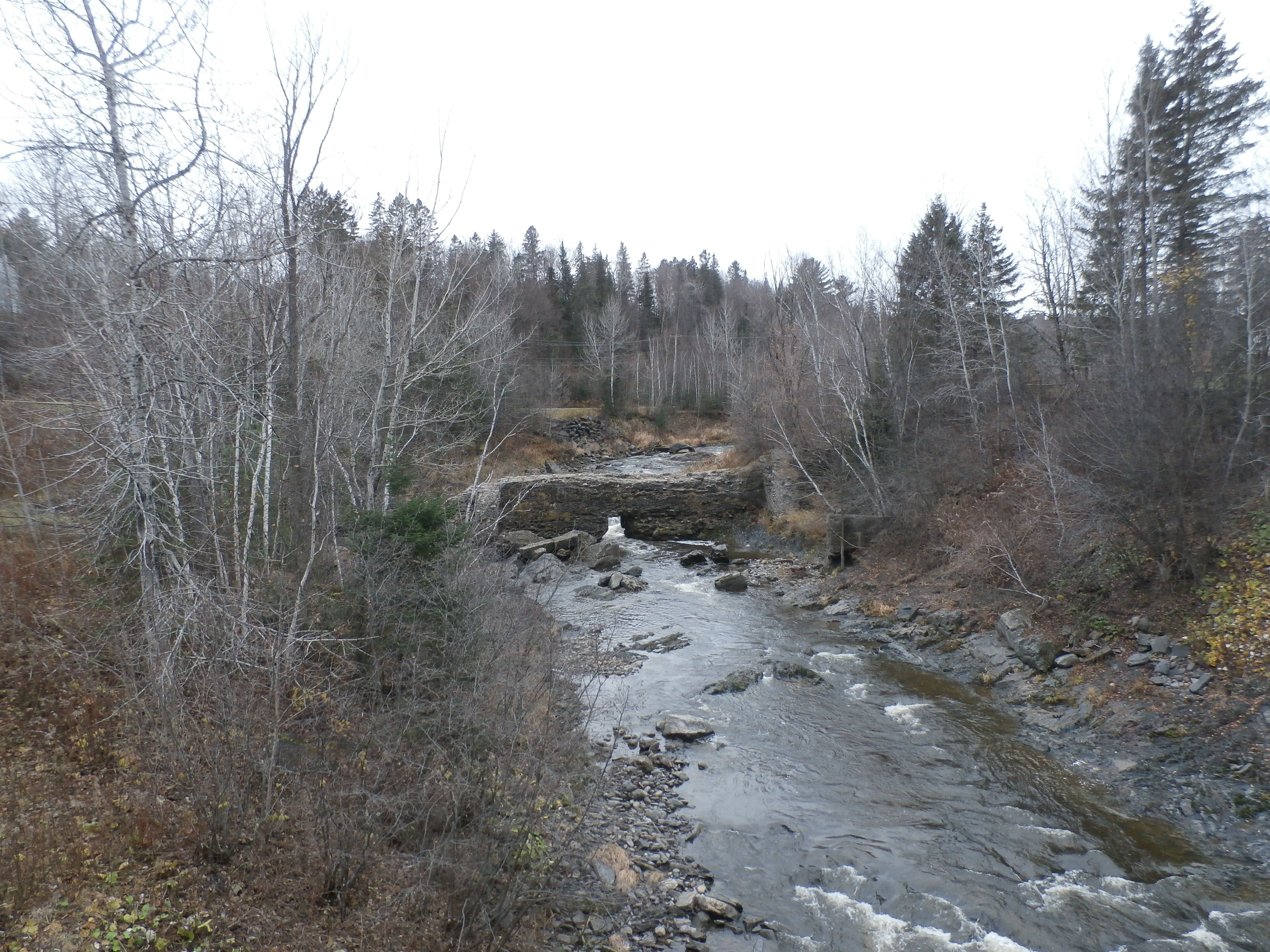
Pozer river and old dam seen from the bridge on route 271 upstream.

Formerly, this watercourse was designated "Jean-Gagnon river"; this name appears on a document of 1818. This name, still attested on a map of 1864 in the form of "Rivière Gagnon", would evoke a pioneer (or a family group) established in this zone. The spelling of this name can also derive from the phonetic evolution of Gallion, one of the components of the patronymic which served to name the lordship Aubert-Gallion. Gayon, Galion and Gagnon are spellings in popular use according to the sources designating this seigneury at various times.

The current name of the river recalls the family of John George Pfo(t)zer (the spelling became Pozer), who acquired the Aubert-Gallion seigneury in 1808. He was nicknamed the Millionaire Pozer. In 1817, he brought to Canada, 189 of his German compatriots whom he installed in his seigneury. This name was imposed by usage towards the end of the last century. It probably evokes more specifically Christian Henry Pozer (1835–1884), lawyer, born and died in the manor of Aubert-Gallion. The latter was elected deputy in 1867 and became a senator in 1876. Throughout his career, he devoted himself actively to the erection of new townships, mining exploration and the construction of railways in Beauce

The toponym "Pozer River" was made official on December 5, 1968, at the Commission de toponymie du Québec.

== See also ==
- List of rivers of Quebec
