= Nicole Jolicoeur =

Canadian artist

- Born: 1947 (age 78–79); Beauceville, Quebec, Canada
- Education: 1978–1981 MA in Visual Arts, (MFA) Rutgers University in New Jersey; 1969–1970 Degree in Arts Education Laval University Ste. Foy, Quebec; 1965–1969 Diploma of École des beaux-arts in Québec City, Qc.
- Alma mater: École des beaux-arts and Rutgers University
- Occupation: Photographer
- Website: http://www.nicolejolicoeur.com/

Nicole Jolicoeur (1947) is a Canadian artist from Quebec, best known for her work in photography and video. In the late 1980s, much of her work was inspired by research into Jean-Martin Charcot's theories on feminine "hysteria."

== Life ==
Jolicoeur was born in 1947 in Beauceville, Quebec. She received an MFA from Rutgers University.

Since the 1980s, Jolicoeur has developed a multidisciplinary practice that articulates image and text within installed devices, to which video was subsequently added. Her work examines modes of representation of the female subject, drawing on varied sources, including the history of psychiatry (particularly Jean-Martin Charcot's work on "female hysteria"), anthropology, religious iconography, and photographic archives. Jolicoeur is also interested in narration, self-representation, and the performative dimensions of the voice.

Her works have been presented since the 1970s in numerous exhibitions in Canada, Europe, and the United States. They are part of several permanent public collections, including those of the Musée national des beaux-arts du Québec, the National Gallery of Canada, and the Musée-Château d'Annecy, as well as the Canada Council for the Arts Art Bank.

== Collections ==
Jolicoeur's work is included in the collections of:

- the Musée national des beaux-arts du Québec,
- the Canada Council Art Bank and
- the National Gallery of Canada.
- Musée-Château d'Annecy

== Exhibitions ==
- La Verite Folle (April 8 – May 7, 1989), Presentation House Gallery, North Vancouver, British Columbia
- Image d'une ville. Corps de l'image (July 1 – September 30, 1997), Palais de l'Isle, Annecy, France; (March 13 – April 18, 1998), Galerie de l'UQAM, Montréal, Québec
- Nicole Jolicoeur (September 17 - October 15, 2009), Gwen Frostic School of Art, Western Michigan University, Kalamazoo, Michigan
- Archives Vagabondes (October 9 – November 8, 2014), Occurrence, Montréal, Québec

== Works ==
- Charcot: deux concepts de nature (1988)
- Stigmata Diaboli (1992)
- Aura Hysterica (1992)
