= Saint-Éphrem-de-Beauce =

- Municipality
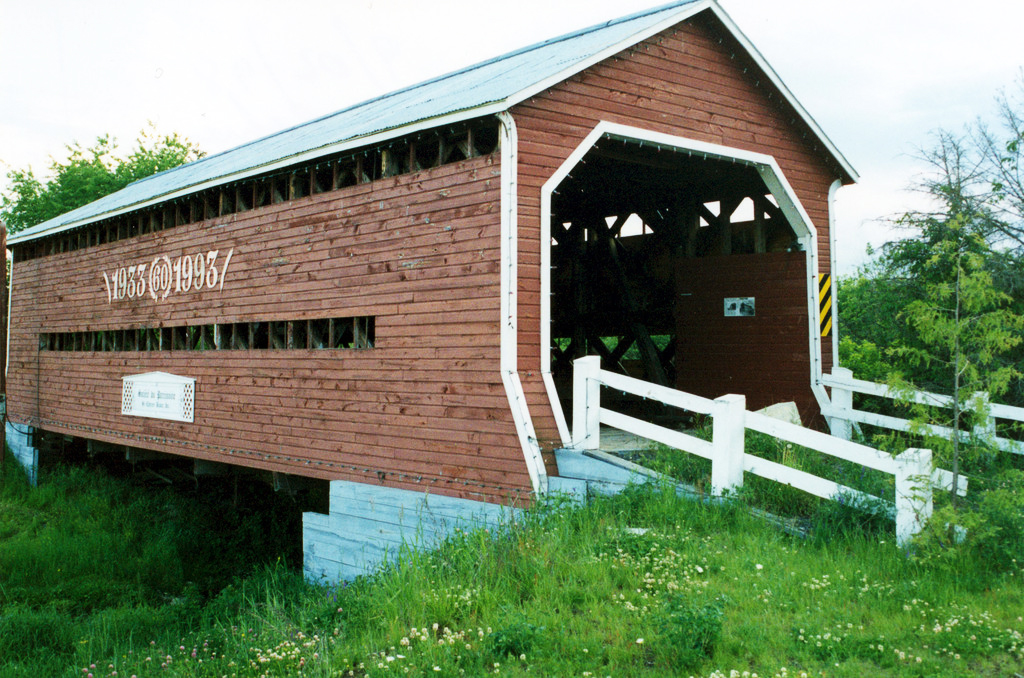
- Napoléon-Grondin bridge

- Flag Seal
- Motto: Proud of our municipality! (French: Fiers de notre municipalité!)
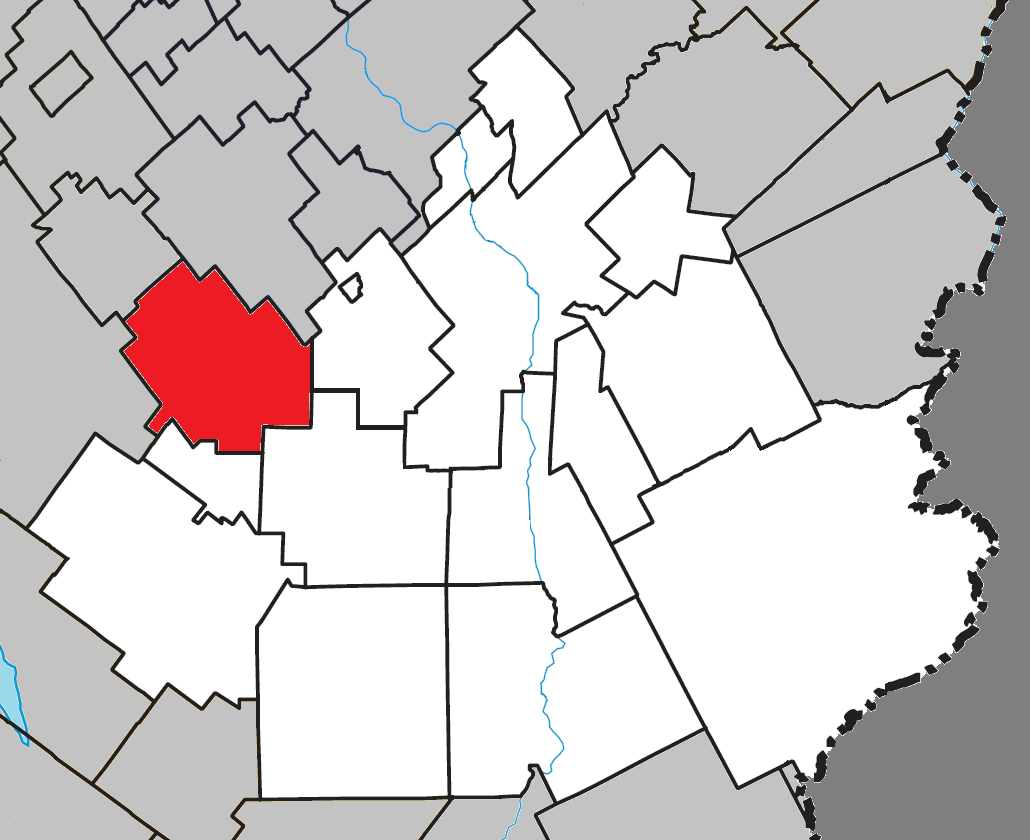
- Location within Beauce-Sartigan RCM.

- Location in southern Quebec.
- Coordinates: 46°04′N 70°57′W
- Country: Canada
- Province: Quebec
- Region: Chaudière-Appalaches
- RCM: Beauce-Sartigan
- Constituted: 24 December 1997

Government
  - Mayor: Carl Gilbert
  - Federal riding: Beauce
  - Prov. riding: Beauce-Sud

Area
  - Municipality: 119.00 km^{2} (45.95 sq mi)
  - Land: 118.90 km^{2} (45.91 sq mi)

Population (2021)
  - Municipality: 2,323
  - Density: 19.5/km^{2} (51/sq mi)
  - Urban: 1,373
  - Pop 2011–2021: ▼3.2%
  - Dwellings: 1,054
- Time zone: UTC−5 (EST)
  - Summer (DST): UTC−4 (EDT)
- Postal code(s): G0M 1R0
- Area codes: 418 and 581
- Highways: R-108; R-269; R-271
- Website: www.saint-ephrem.com

Saint-Éphrem-de-Beauce (French pronunciation: [sɛ̃t‿efʁɛm də bos], lit. 'Saint Éphrem of Beauce') is a municipality in the Municipalité régionale de comté de Beauce-Sartigan in Quebec, Canada. It is part of the Chaudière-Appalaches region and the population was 2,567 as of the Canadian census of 2011. It was named after Ephrem the Syrian.

== History ==
- 1855 : Constitution of the municipalité de canton de Tring
- 1866 : The municipalité de paroisse de Saint-Éphrem-de-Tring is created during the breakup of Tring.
- 1870 : Saint-Éphrem-de-Tring changes its status to municipality.
- 1897 : The municipalité de village de Saint-Éphrem-de-Tring detaches from the municipality.
- 1956 : The municipality of Saint-Ephrem de Tring changed its name to municipalité de paroisse de Saint-Éphrem-de-Beauce
- 1997 : Fusion between Saint-Éphrem-de-Tring and Saint-Éphrem-de-Beauce to become the municipalité de Saint-Éphrem-de-Beauce.

=== Flag origin ===
It incorporates the same colours as the French flag as a sign of the community's French identity. The three green maple leaves on a white background represent its maple country location, while the number three is for the founding communities of Saint-Isidore, Sainte-Marie and Beauceville. The flag was adopted in 1955.

== Geography ==
Saint-Éphrem-de-Beauce lies to the south-west of Saint-Georges, on the banks of the Rivière des Hamel, which flows from the south-west of the municipality towards the north-east, where it meets the Bras Saint-Victor, which crosses the municipality from south to north.

The municipality covers an area of approximately 120 square kilometres.

== Demographics ==
Population trend

Census	Population	Change (%)
2021	2,323	▼3.2%
2016	2,400	▼6.5%
2011	2,567	▼2.3%
2006	2,627	▲1.6%
2001	2,585	N/A

== Economy ==
Some important industries are there so:

- René Matériaux Composites
- Porte Baillargeon
- Industrie PHL
- Filature Lemieux
- Transport Couture

== See also ==
Woodstock en Beauce
