= Drolet Lake =

Lake in Quebec, Canada

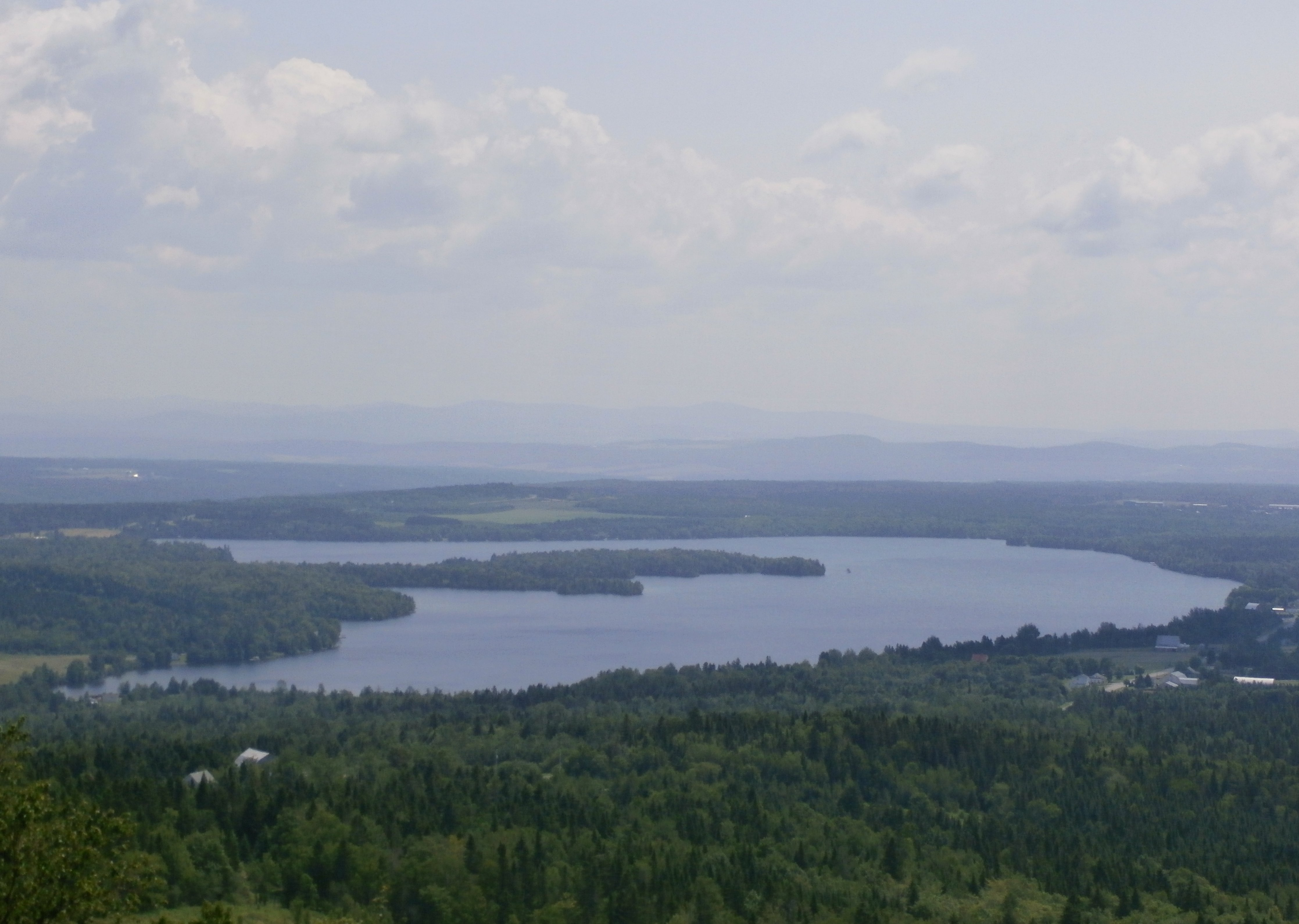
- Lake Drolet seen from the site of the Maison Du Granit at an altitude of 680 meters on the eastern flank of Le Morne between Lac-Drolet and St-Sébastien.

- Location within Quebec
- Coordinates: 45.740833°N 70.86584°W
- Primary outflows: Drolet River
- Basin countries: Canada, Quebec, Estrie
- Max. length: 3.2 kilometres (2.0 mi)
- Max. width: 1.5 kilometres (0.93 mi)
- Surface area: 2.9 kilometres (1.80 mi)
- Average depth: 8 metres (26 ft)
- Surface elevation: 457 metres (1,499 ft)

The Lake Drolet (in French: lac Drolet and formerly Saint-Samuel-de-Gayhurst) is a lake located near the village of Lac-Drolet, in Le Granit Regional County Municipality, in Estrie, in Quebec, Canada. It is the source of the Drolet River, a tributary of the Chaudière River and a sub-tributary of the St. Lawrence River.

== Geography ==
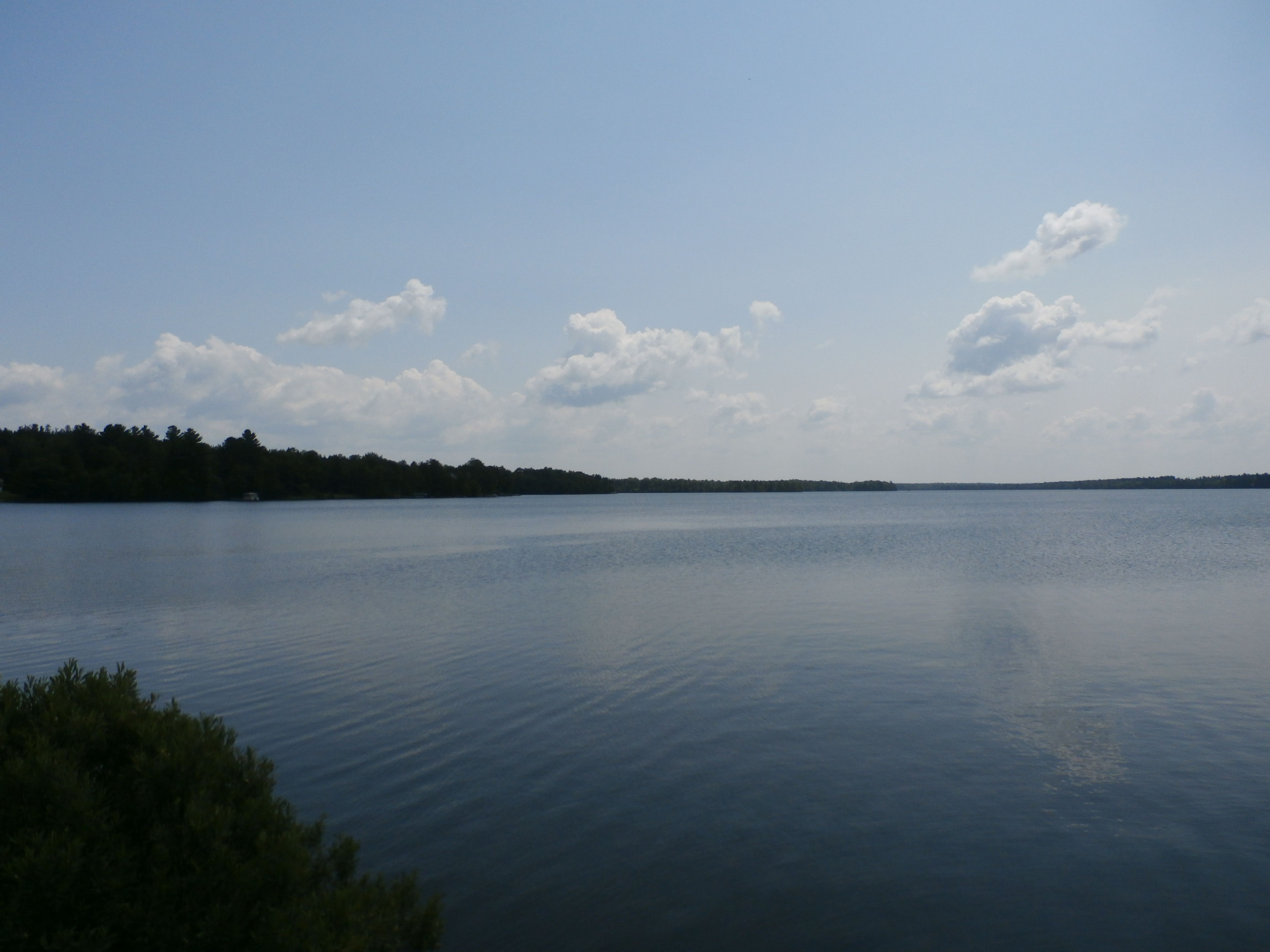
Lac Drolet seen from seventh rang

Its area is 708 acres, its elevation is 457 meters, and its maximum depth is 8 meters. The species of fish are; rainbow trout, brown trout and walleye. The name evokes a surveyor from Saint-Sébastien who would go fishing on the frozen lake in winter. The lake is located about 2 kilometres (1.2 mi) from the Morne de Saint-Sébastien, which rises to an altitude of 820 meters (2,690 ft).

== Tourism ==
Located near the Route des Sommets, in an environment where nature and mountains are omnipresent, the area is ideal for hiking, camping, and outdoor activities.
