= Saint-Martin, Quebec =

Saint-Martin
- Parish municipality
- Motto: L'entraide dans la charité (French for "Mutual Aid in Charity")
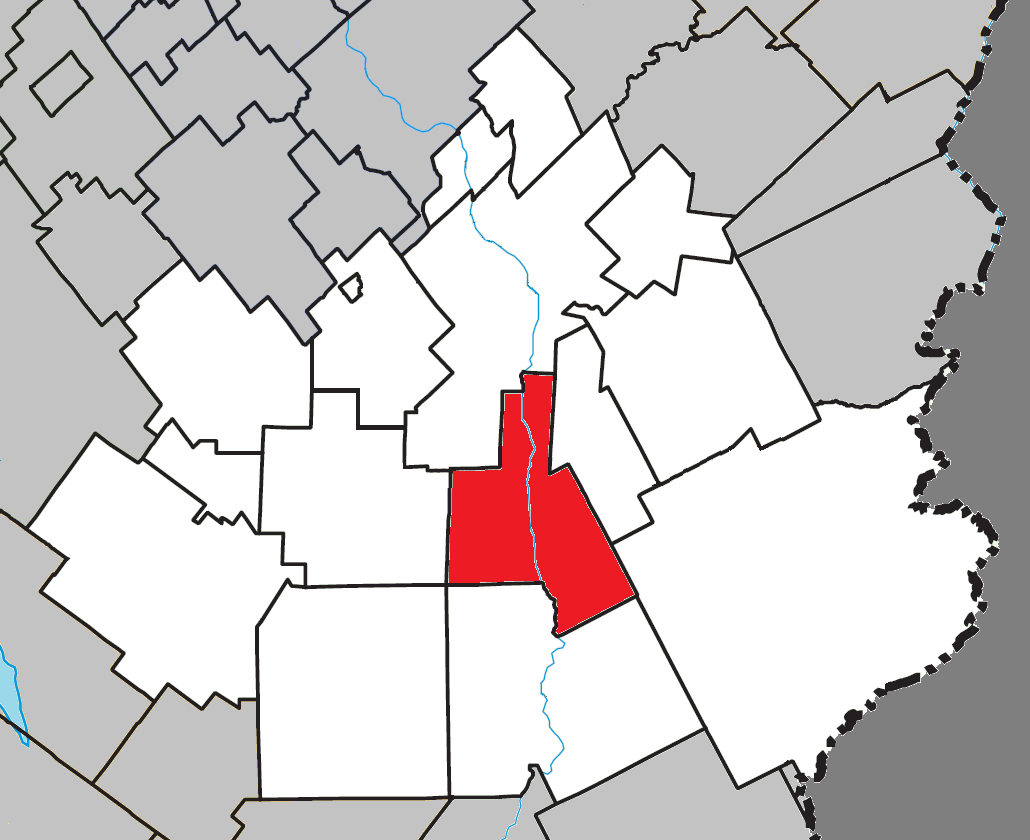
- Location within Beauce-Sartigan RCM.

- Location in southern Quebec.
- Coordinates: 45°58′N 70°39′W
- Country: Canada
- Province: Quebec
- Region: Chaudière-Appalaches
- RCM: Beauce-Sartigan
- Constituted: October 12, 1911

Government
  - Mayor: Yvan Paré
  - Federal riding: Beauce
  - Prov. riding: Beauce-Sud

Area
  - Parish municipality: 119.90 km^{2} (46.29 sq mi)
  - Land: 118 km^{2} (46 sq mi)
  - Urban: 3.37 km^{2} (1.30 sq mi)

Population (2021)
  - Parish municipality: 2,588
  - Density: 21.9/km^{2} (57/sq mi)
  - Urban: 1,672
  - Urban density: 496.4/km^{2} (1,286/sq mi)
  - Pop 2016-2021: ▲4.5%
  - Dwellings: 1,226
- Time zone: UTC−5 (EST)
  - Summer (DST): UTC−4 (EDT)
- Postal code(s): G0M 1B0
- Area codes: 418 and 581
- Highways: R-204; R-269
- Website: www.st-martin.qc.ca

Saint-Martin (French pronunciation: [sɛ̃ maʁtɛ̃]) is a parish municipality in the Beauce-Sartigan Regional County Municipality in the Chaudière-Appalaches region of Quebec, Canada. Its population is 2,588 as of the Canada 2021 Census. It is named after Martin of Tours.

== Demographics ==
=== Population ===
In the 2021 Census of Population conducted by Statistics Canada, Saint-Martin had a population of 2,588 living in 1,136 of its 1,226 total private dwellings, a change of 4.5% from its 2016 population of 2,477. With a land area of 118 km^{2} (46 sq mi), it had a population density of 21.9/km^{2} (56.8/sq mi) in 2021.

Population trend:

Census	Population	Change (%)
2021	2,588	▲4.5%
2016	2,477	▲0.6%
2011	2,462	▼3.2%
2006	2,543	▼2.1%
2001	2,598	▲2.0%
1996	2,546	▲4.2%
1991	2,443	▼0.1%
1986	2,445	▼1.9%
1981	2,493	▲4.9%
1976	2,377	▲0.1%
1971	2,375	▼7.4%
1966	2,564	▲5.2%
1961	2,437	▼2.3%
1956	2,494	▼3.3%
1951	2,579	▼4.2%
1941	2,691	▲17.7%
1931	2,287	▲26.1%
1921	1,813	▲27.1%
1911	1,426	▲48.7%
1901	959	▲7.3%
1891	894	N/A

=== Language ===
Mother tongue language (2021)

Language	Population	Pct (%)
French only	2,520	97.5%
English only	10	0.4%
Both English and French	5	0.2%
Other languages	50	1.9%
