= Saint-Alfred, Quebec =

Saint-Alfred
- Municipality
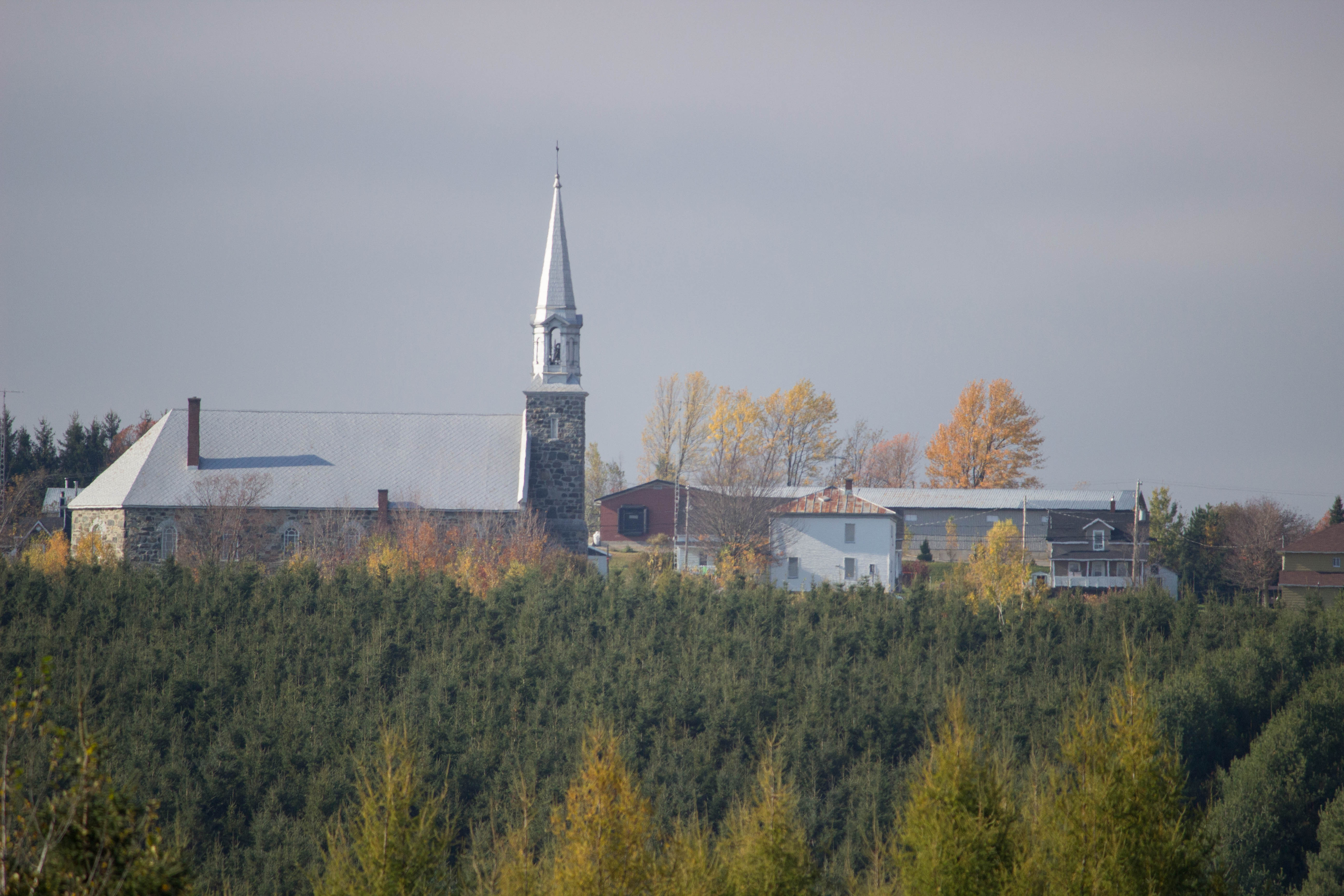
- Saint-Alfred from rang Saint-Étienne

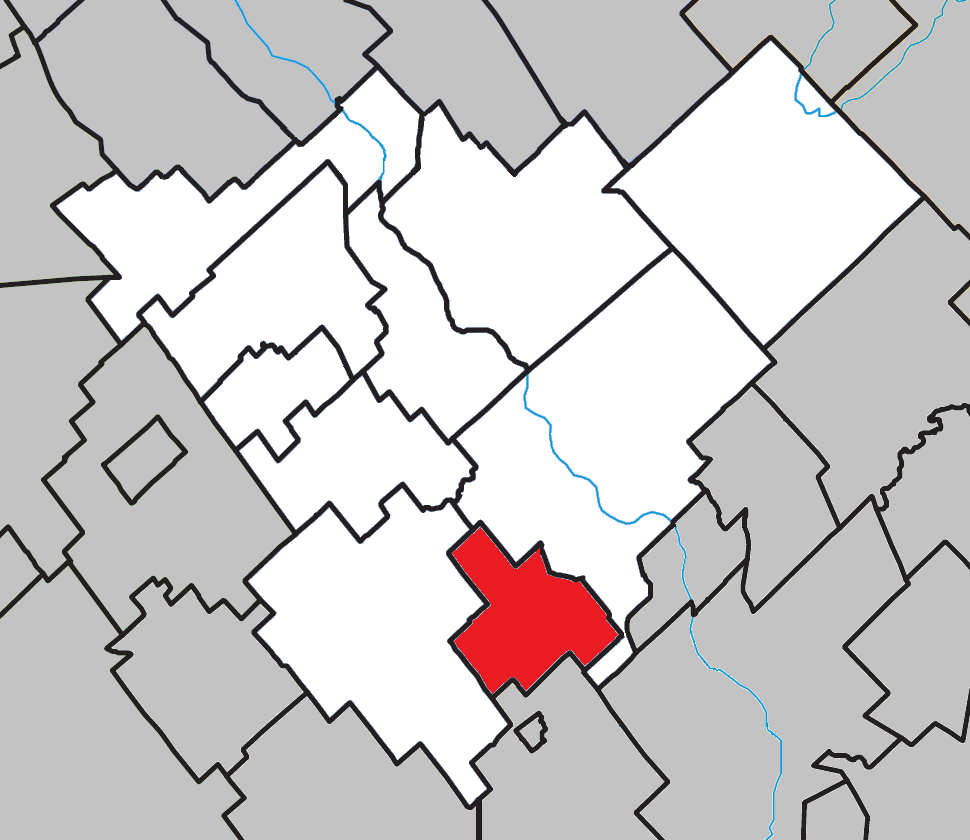
- Location within Beauce-Centre RCM.

- Location in southern Quebec.
- Coordinates: 46°09′N 70°50′W
- Country: Canada
- Province: Quebec
- Region: Chaudière-Appalaches
- RCM: Beauce-Centre
- Constituted: January 1, 1950

Government
  - Mayor: Marie-Josée Therrien
  - Federal riding: Beauce
  - Prov. riding: Beauce-Nord

Area
  - Total: 43.90 km^{2} (16.95 sq mi)
  - Land: 43.49 km^{2} (16.79 sq mi)

Population (2021)
  - Total: 519
  - Density: 11.9/km^{2} (31/sq mi)
  - Pop 2016-2021: ▲7.7%
  - Dwellings: 241
- Time zone: UTC−5 (EST)
  - Summer (DST): UTC−4 (EDT)
- Postal code(s): G0M 1L0
- Area codes: 418 and 581
- Highways: R-108
- Website: www.st-alfred.qc.ca

Saint-Alfred (French pronunciation: [sɛ̃t‿alfʁɛd]) is a municipality in the Municipalité régionale de comté Beauce-Centre in Quebec, Canada. It is part of the Chaudière-Appalaches region and the population is 519 as of 2021. It is named after Alfred the Great and as a tribute to Joseph-Alfred Langlois, Bishop of the Diocese of Valleyfield.

== History ==
Saint-Alfred was created in 1950 when sections of Saint-François-Ouest, Saint-Victor-de-Tring and Saint-Benoît-Labre were merged to create the new municipality.
