= Saint-Ludger =

- Municipality
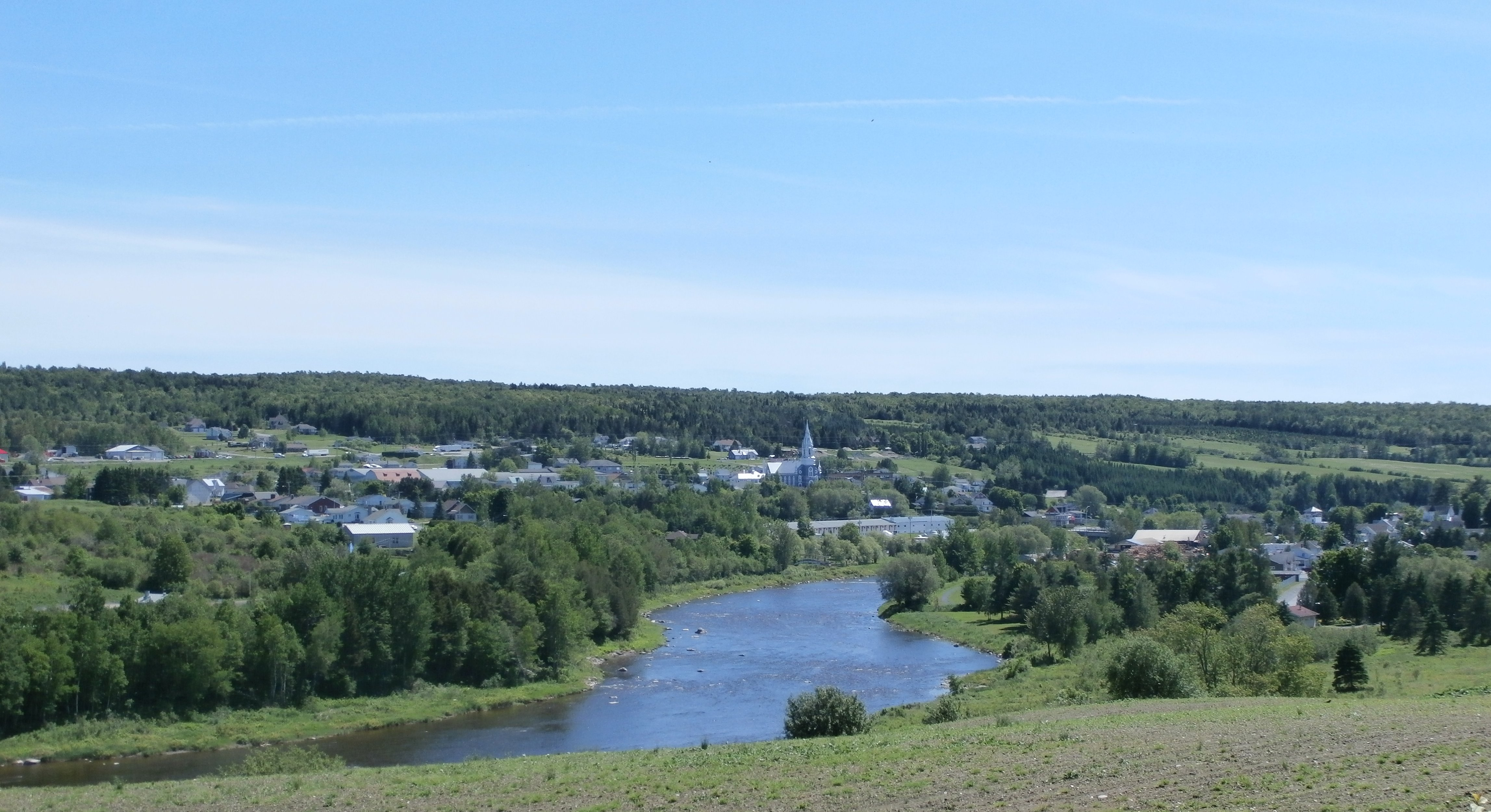

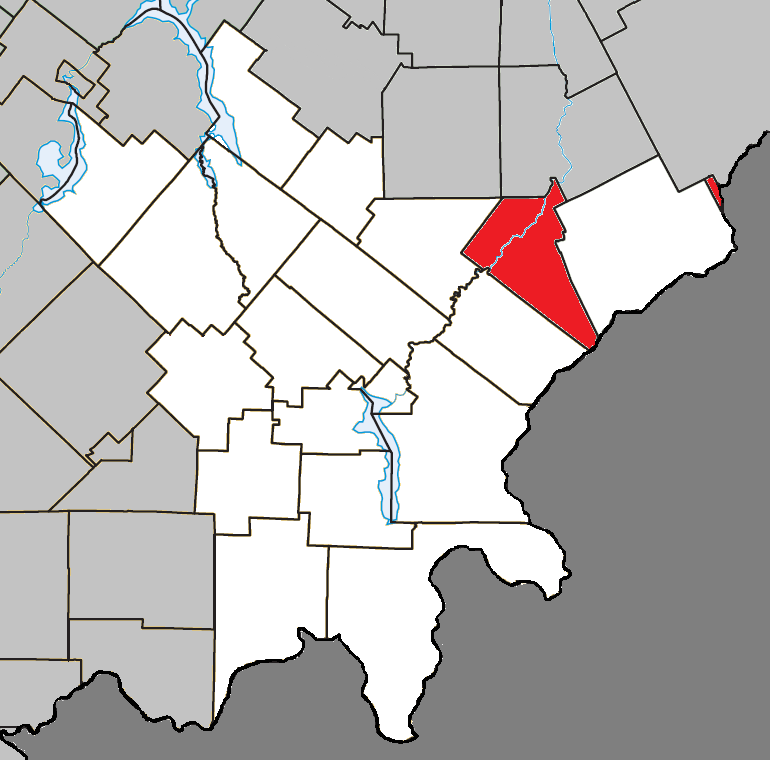
- Location within Le Granit RCM

- Location in southern Quebec
- Coordinates: 45°45′N 70°42′W
- Country: Canada
- Province: Quebec
- Region: Estrie
- RCM: Le Granit
- Constituted: February 25, 1998

Government
  - Mayor: Denis Poulin
  - Federal riding: Mégantic—L'Érable—Lotbinière
  - Prov. riding: Beauce-Sud

Area
  - Total: 128.70 km^{2} (49.69 sq mi)
  - Land: 127.58 km^{2} (49.26 sq mi)

Population (2021)
  - Total: 1,074
  - Density: 8.4/km^{2} (22/sq mi)
  - Pop 2016-2021: ▲0.3%
  - Dwellings: 507
- Time zone: UTC−5 (EST)
  - Summer (DST): UTC−4 (EDT)
- Postal code(s): G0M 1W0
- Area code: 819
- Highways: R-204
- Website: www.st-ludger.qc.ca

Saint-Ludger is a municipality in the Le Granit Regional County Municipality in Estrie, Quebec, Canada, on the Canada–United States border. The population is 1,074 as of 2021.

The municipality of Saint-Ludger was created in 1998 from the amalgamation of the village of Saint-Ludger, the municipality of Risborough and the township of Gayhurst-Partie-Sud-Est. The first settlers arrived in the area before 1863. It is named in honour of Ludger of Utrecht, the first bishop of Münster in the 9th century.

== Demographics ==
In the 2021 Census of Population conducted by Statistics Canada, Saint-Ludger had a population of 1,074 living in 449 of its 507 total private dwellings, a change of 0.3% from its 2016 population of 1,071. With a land area of 127.58 km^{2} (49.26 sq mi), it had a population density of 8.4/km^{2} (21.8/sq mi) in 2021.
