= Beauceville =

- City
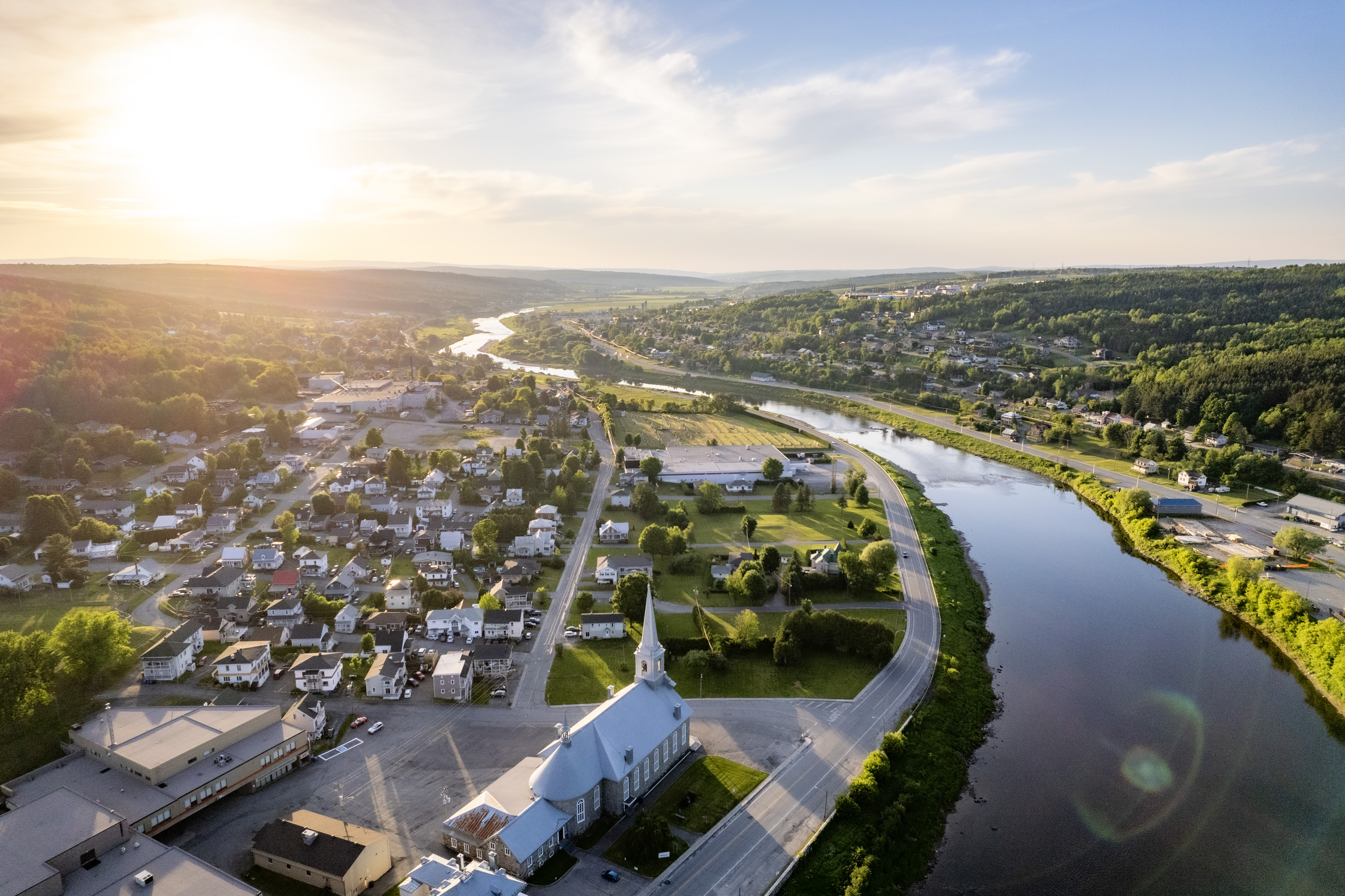
- Aerial view of Beauceville

- Coat of arms

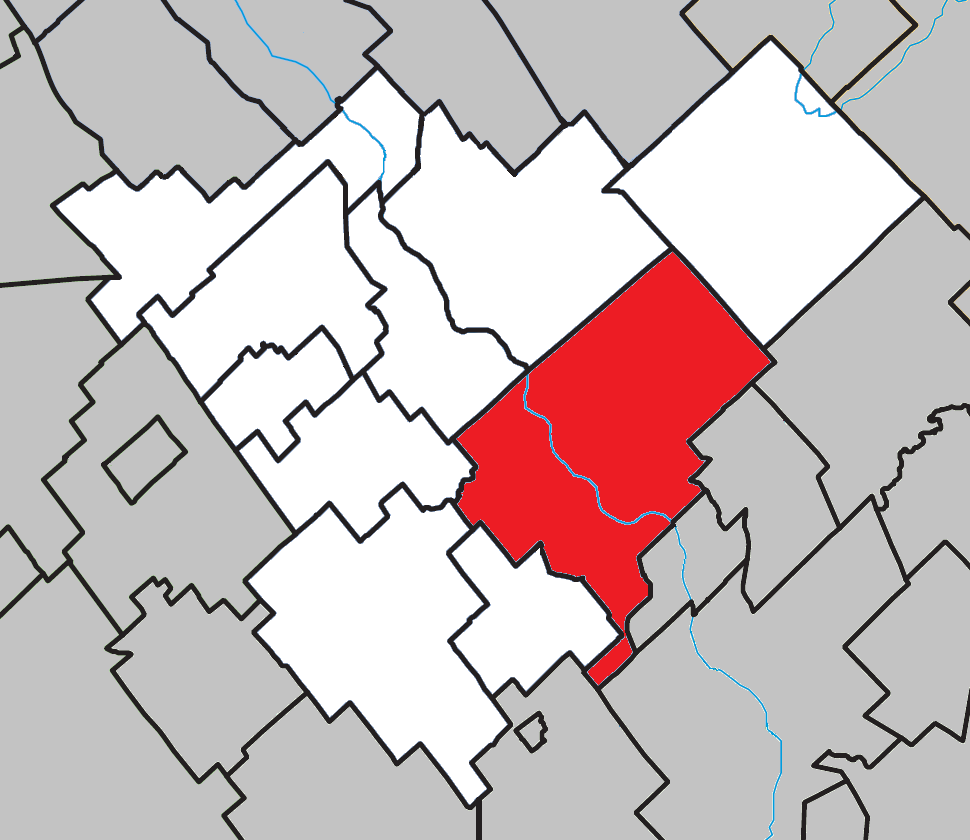
- Location within Beauce-Centre RCM

- Location in southern Quebec
- Coordinates: 46°12′N 70°47′W
- Country: Canada
- Province: Quebec
- Region: Chaudière-Appalaches
- RCM: Beauce-Centre
- Constituted: February 25, 1998

Government
  - Mayor: Patrick Mathieu
  - Federal riding: Beauce
  - Prov. riding: Beauce-Nord

Area
  - City: 166.20 km^{2} (64.17 sq mi)
  - Land: 164.59 km^{2} (63.55 sq mi)
  - Urban: 6.07 km^{2} (2.34 sq mi)

Population (2021)
  - City: 6,185
  - Density: 37.6/km^{2} (97/sq mi)
  - Urban: 3,598
  - Urban density: 592.5/km^{2} (1,535/sq mi)
  - Pop 2016-2021: ▼1.7%
  - Dwellings: 2,875
- Time zone: UTC−5 (EST)
  - Summer (DST): UTC−4 (EDT)
- Postal code(s): G5X
- Area codes: 418 and 581
- Highways A-73: R-108; R-173
- Website: www.ville. beauceville.qc.ca

Beauceville (French pronunciation: [bosvil]) is a city in, and the seat of, the Municipalité régionale de comté Beauce-Centre in Quebec, Canada. It is part of the Chaudière-Appalaches region and the population was 6,185 as of the Canada 2021 Census.

Beauceville's new constitution dates from 1998, when it amalgamated with Saint-François-Ouest and Saint-François-de-Beauce. The previous city was also the creation of a merging between Beauceville and Beauceville-Est, distinction made because each shared a bank of the Chaudière River. Beauceville was the first municipality in Beauce to be constituted as a city when it detached from Saint-François-de-Beauce in 1904.

== History ==
Before its creation, the territory where Beauceville currently sits was known as Saint-François-de-la-Beauce. The actual city of Beauceville was formed in 1904, when it split from the municipality of Saint-François. In 1930 it lost some of its territory, when the city of Beauceville-Est was created, but regained it in 1973 when Beauceville-Est merged with Beauceville. In 1998 Beauceville gained significant territories, when it annexed the neighbouring municipalities of Saint-François-de-Beauce (the municipality from which Beauceville had originally split) and Saint-François-Ouest. Throughout its history, Beauceville has suffered from spring floods of the Chaudière River, and many streets of the municipality have been repeatedly inundated, causing great damage.

In recent years, Beauceville has seen economic prosperity. The municipality has more than 25 manufacturing companies and its industrial park is expanding and welcoming many new companies.

== Geography ==
Covering an area of 164.56 km^{2}, Beauceville extends on both banks of the Chaudière River, 85 km south of Quebec City, 55 km from the border of the US state of Maine and 150 km from Sherbrooke.

=== Neighbourhoods ===
- Beauceville-Est
- Centre-ville
- Saint-François-de-Beauce
- Saint-François-Ouest

== Demographics ==
In the 2021 Census of Population conducted by Statistics Canada, Beauceville had a population of 6,185 living in 2,723 of its 2,875 total private dwellings, a change of −1.7% from its 2016 population of 6,291. With a land area of 164.59 km^{2} (63.55 sq mi), it had a population density of 37.6/km^{2} (97.3/sq mi) in 2021.

Canada census – Beauceville community profile

	2021	2016	2011
Population	6,185 (-1.7% from 2016)	6,281 (-1.1% from 2011)	6,354 (+2.1% from 2006)
Land area	164.59 km^{2} (63.55 sq mi)	164.55 km^{2} (63.53 sq mi)	167.54 km^{2} (64.69 sq mi)
Population density	37.6/km^{2} (97/sq mi)	38.2/km^{2} (99/sq mi)	37.9/km^{2} (98/sq mi)
Median age	45.2 (M: 44.4, F: 46.4)	45.1 (M: 43.7, F: 46.6)	43.6 (M: 42.3, F: 45.1)
Private dwellings	2,875 (total)	2,834 (total)	2,841 (total)
Median household income	$65,500	$54,912	$53,802

References: 2021 2016 2011

Beauceville, Quebec – Historical census populations
Year	Pop.	±%
1911	1,677	—
1921	1,448	−13.7%
1931	707	−51.2%
1941	899	+27.2%
1951	1,149	+27.8%
1956	1,459	+27.0%
1961	1,645	+12.7%
1966	1,905	+15.8%
1971	2,098	+10.1%
1976	4,276	+103.8%
1981	4,302	+0.6%
1986	4,129	−4.0%
1991	3,869	−6.3%
1996	3,751	−3.0%
2001	6,261	+66.9%
2006	6,226	−0.6%
2011	6,354	+2.1%
2016	6,291	−1.0%
2021	6,185	−1.7%

== Infrastructure ==
Autoroute 73 crosses Beauceville's territory at exit 61.

== Notable people ==
- William Chapman, poet born in Saint-François-de-Beauce
- Nicole Jolicoeur, artist
- Marie-Philip Poulin, Professional Women's Hockey League player, Olympic gold medallist (2010, 2014, 2022)
- Jeanne St. Laurent, wife to former Prime Minister Louis St. Laurent
- Stéphane Veilleux, National Hockey League player
