= Bras Saint-Victor =

River in Chaudière-Appalaches, Quebec (Canada)

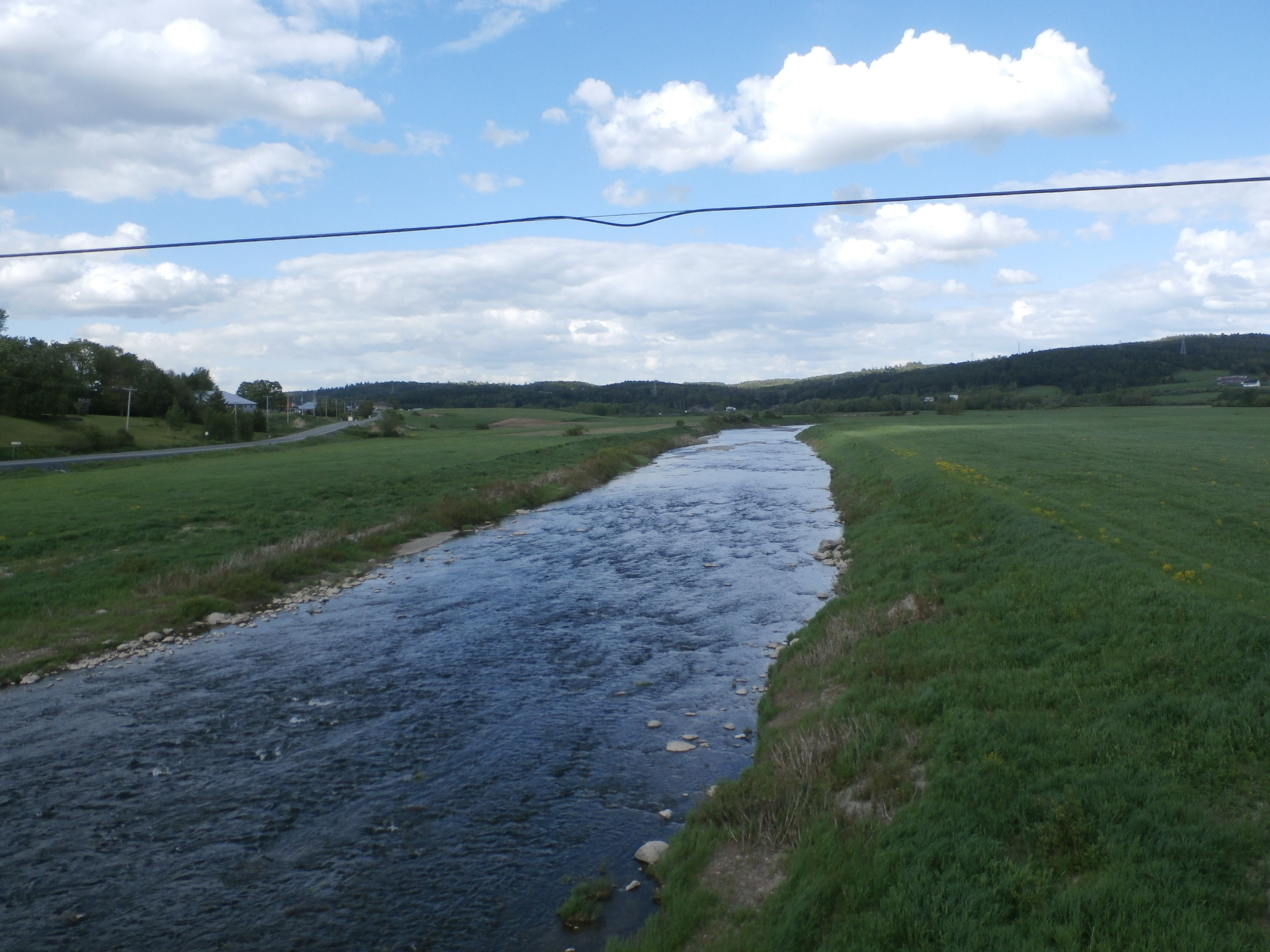
- River of "Bras Saint-Victor" near its confluence with the river.

- Location within Quebec

Location
- Country: Canada
- Province: Quebec
- Region: Chaudière-Appalaches
- MRC: Beauce-Sartigan Regional County Municipality, Robert-Cliche Regional County Municipality

Physical characteristics
- Source: Forested streams
  - location: La Guadeloupe
  - coordinates: 45.974632°N 70.916203°W
  - elevation: 405 metres (1,329 ft)
- Mouth: Chaudière River
  - location: Beauceville
  - coordinates: 46.265°N 70.82555°W
  - elevation: 140 metres (460 ft)
- Length: 40.3 kilometres (25.0 mi)

Basin features
- River system: St. Lawrence River
- Tributaries
  - left: (upstream) ruisseau Cliche, ruisseau des Castors, ruisseau Mathieu, ruisseau des Ormes, rivière du Cinq, rivière Prévost-Gilbert, rivière des Hamel, ruisseau Vermette, ruisseau Bernard, ruisseau Vaseux
  - right: (upstream) ruisseau Félix, ruisseau de la Pointe, ruisseau Poulin-Latulippe, ruisseau Le Petit Shenley, Décharge du Dix

The Bras Saint-Victor (in English: Saint-Victor arm) is a tributary of the west shore of the Chaudière River which flows northward to empty onto the south shore of the St. Lawrence River. It flows in the administrative region of Chaudière-Appalaches, in Quebec, in Canada, in Beauce-Sartigan Regional County Municipality: municipalities La Guadeloupe and Saint-Éphrem-de-Beauce; and Robert-Cliche Regional County Municipality: municipalities Saint-Victor, Saint-Jules and Beauceville.

== Toponymy ==
The toponym “bras Saint-Victor” was made official on December 5, 1968, at the Commission de toponymie du Québec.

== See also ==
- List of rivers of Quebec
