= Lac-Drolet =

- Municipality
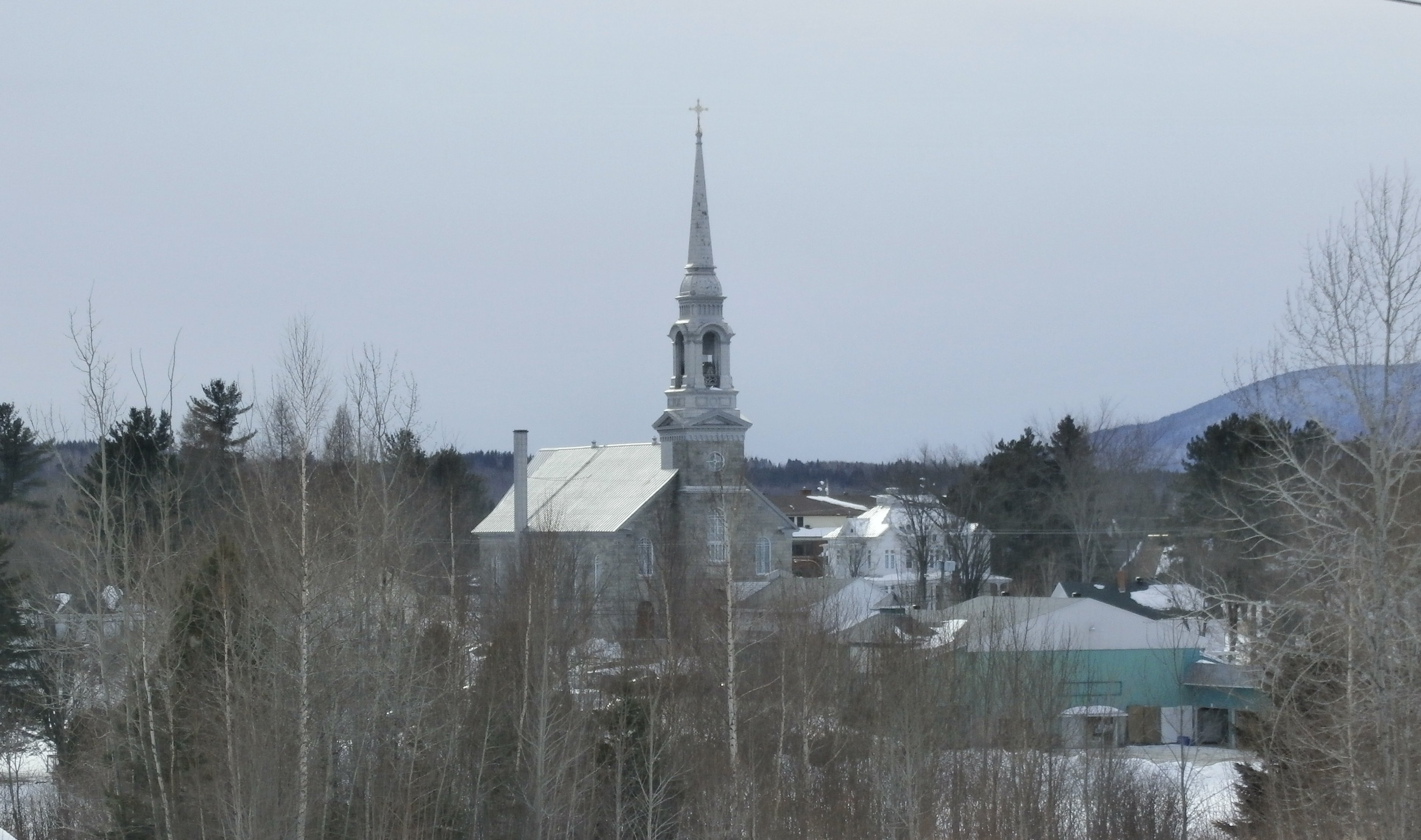

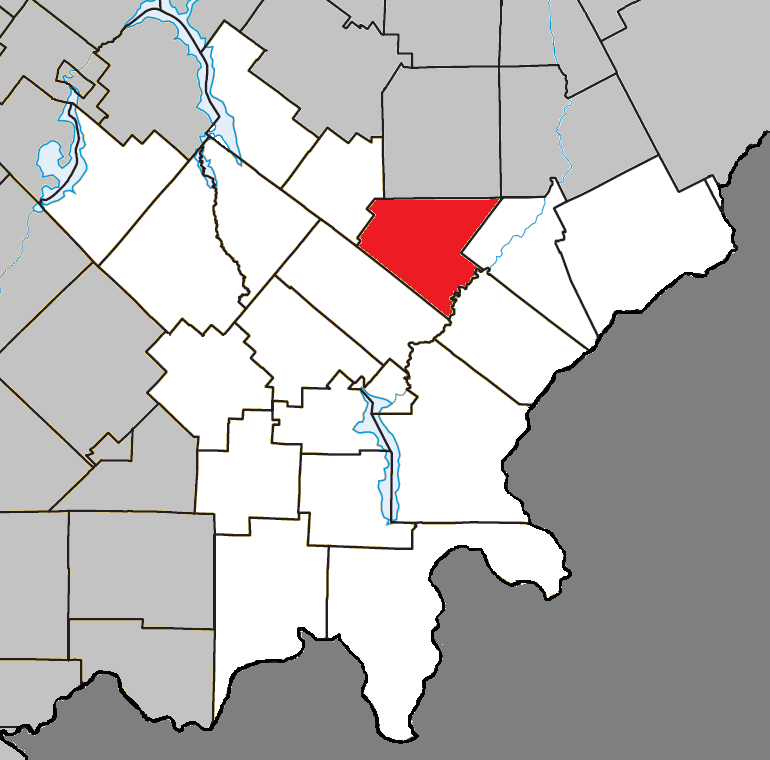
- Location within Le Granit RCM

- Location in southern Quebec
- Coordinates: 45°43′N 70°51′W
- Country: Canada
- Province: Quebec
- Region: Estrie
- RCM: Le Granit
- Constituted: January 1, 1885
- Named for: Drolet Lake

Government
  - Mayor: Sylvio Therrien
  - Federal riding: Mégantic—L'Érable—Lotbinière
  - Prov. riding: Mégantic

Area
  - Total: 128.20 km^{2} (49.50 sq mi)
  - Land: 124.30 km^{2} (47.99 sq mi)

Population (2021)
  - Total: 1,067
  - Density: 8.6/km^{2} (22/sq mi)
  - Pop 2016-2021: ▲4.5%
  - Dwellings: 600
- Time zone: UTC−5 (EST)
  - Summer (DST): UTC−4 (EDT)
- Postal code(s): G0Y 1C0
- Area code: 819
- Highways: No major routes
- Website: lacdrolet.ca

Lac-Drolet (French pronunciation: [lak dʁɔlɛ]) is a municipality in the Municipalité régionale de comté du Granit in Estrie, Quebec, Canada. Population is 1,108 as of 2006.

The minor Battle of the Chaudière, opposing British police and Lower Canadian rebels, was fought at Lac-Drolet during the Patriots' War in 1838. The battle had little incidence on the war, and about 50 rebels were captured and three were hanged.

== Demographics ==
In the 2021 Census of Population conducted by Statistics Canada, Lac-Drolet had a population of 1,067 living in 492 of its 600 total private dwellings, a change of 4.5% from its 2016 population of 1,021. With a land area of 124.30 km^{2} (47.99 sq mi), it had a population density of 8.6/km^{2} (22.2/sq mi) in 2021.

=== Population ===
Population trend:

| Census | Population | Change (%) |
|---|---|---|
| 2021 | 1,067 | ▲4.5% |
| 2016 | 1,021 | ▼4.7% |
| 2011 | 1,071 | ▼6.7% |
| 2006 | 1,148 | ▼1.5% |
| 2001 | 1,165 | ▲2.8% |
| 1996 | 1,133 | ▼1.2% |
| 1991 | 1,147 | ▼1.5% |
| 1986 | 1,164 | ▲3.9% |
| 1981 | 1,120 | ▲10.3% |
| 1976 | 1,015 | ▼4.9% |
| 1971 | 1,067 | ▼13.4% |
| 1966 | 1,232 | ▼5.3% |
| 1961 | 1,301 | ▼10.0% |
| 1956 | 1,446 | ▲3.1% |
| 1951 | 1,403 | ▼1.8% |
| 1941 | 1,429 | ▲1.5% |
| 1931 | 1,408 | ▲12.5% |
| 1921 | 1,251 | ▼7.4% |
| 1911 | 1,351 | ▼1.1% |
| 1901 | 1,366 | ▲53.7% |
| 1891 | 889 | N/A |
