= Frontenac County, Quebec =

Former county of Quebec, Canada

Coordinates: 45°35′N 70°50′W

Frontenac County was a county of Quebec, Canada. It existed between 1912 and the early 1980s. The territory it covered is today divided into the regional county municipalities of Le Granit in the administrative regions of the Estrie and Beauce-Sartigan in Chaudière-Appalaches. Its capital was the municipality of Lac-Mégantic.

The county was created in 1912 from parts of the counties of Compton and Beauce.

The county name comes from that of the governor of New France, Louis de Buade de Frontenac.

The county was formed in 19 townships. The townships in Compton County were Winslow, Whitton, Marston, Chesham and Clinton. The townships from Beauce County were Price, Lambton, Adstock, Aylmer, Forsyth, Woburn, Dorset, Gayhurst, Spalding, Ditchfield, Louise and Risborough as well as parts of Shenley and Marlow.

== Municipalities located within the county ==
=== Municipalities in Compton County (prior to 1912) ===
- Frontenac (called the United Counties of Spaulding and Ditchfield until 1959)
- Lac-Mégantic (called Mégantic until 1958)
- Marston
- Milan
- Nantes (called Whitton until 1957)
- Notre-Dame-des-Bois (called Chesham until 1958)
- Piopolis (called Marston-Partie-Sud until 1958)
- Sainte-Cécile-de-Whitton
- Saint-Romain (called Winslow North until 1962)
- Stornoway (called Winslow South until 1973)
- Val-Racine (called Saint-Léon-de-Marston until 1957)

=== Municipalities in Beauce County (prior to 1912) ===
- Saint-Méthode-de-Frontenac (called Saint-Méthode d'Adstock until 1945, merged with Adstock in 2001)
- Lambton
- Lac-Mégantic
- Saint-Gédéon-de-Beauce
- Courcelles-Saint-Évariste (Courcelles and Saint-Évariste-de-Forsyth merged in 2024)
- Saint-Sébastien
- Lac-Drolet (called Saint-Samuel-de-Gayhurst until 1968)
- Audet (called Saint-Hubert-de-Spaulding until 1959)
- Saint-Ludger
- Saint-Robert-Bellarmin
- Saint-Hilaire-de-Dorset
