= Legendre River =

River in Estrie, Quebec, Canada

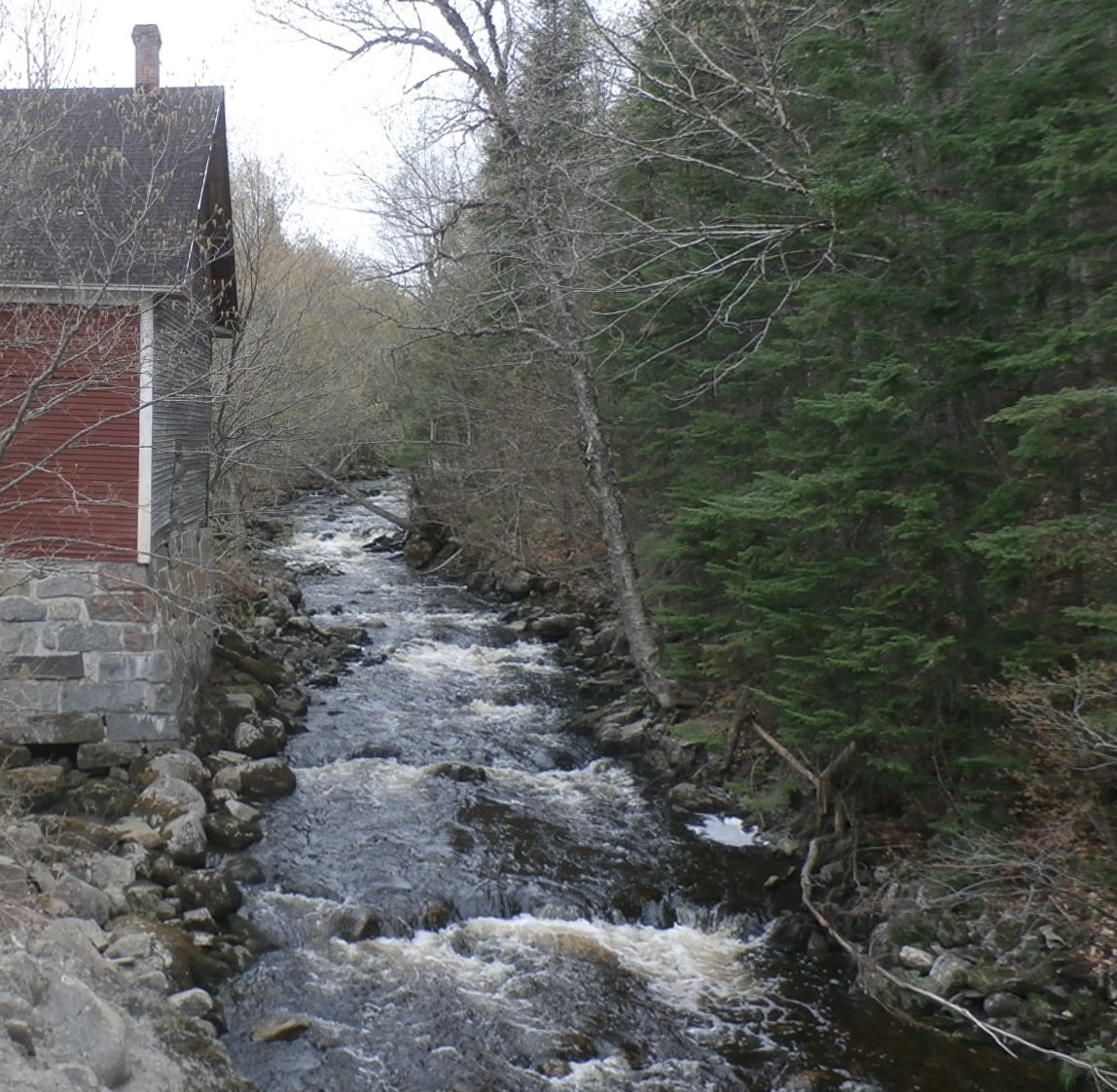
- Rivière Legendre près du moulin Legendre à Stornoway.
- Native name: Rivière Legendre (French)

Location
- Country: Canada
- Province: Quebec
- Region: Estrie
- MRC: Le Granit Regional County Municipality
- Municipality: Milan, Stornoway

Physical characteristics
- Source: Whitton Lake
  - location: Milan
  - coordinates: 45.589327°N 71.167044°W
  - elevation: 518 m (1,699 ft)
- Mouth: Felton River
  - location: Saint-Romain
  - coordinates: 45.73889°N 71.13695°W
  - elevation: 325 m (1,066 ft)
- Length: 25.1 km (15.6 mi)

Basin features
- Progression: Saint-François River, St. Lawrence River
- Tributaries
  - left: (upstream)
  - right: (upstream)

The Legendre River (in French: rivière Legendre) is a tributary of the Felton River which flows into the Baie Sauvage to the south of Grand lac Saint François which constitutes the head lake of the Saint-François River.

The course of the Legendre River crosses the territories of the municipalities of Milan and Stornoway, in the Le Granit Regional County Municipality (MRC), in the administrative region of Estrie, on the South Shore of the St. Lawrence River, in Quebec, Canada.

== Geography ==
The main neighboring hydrographic slopes of the "Legendre river" are:

- north side: Felton River, Grand lac Saint François;
- east side: Felton River, Noire River;
- south side: Blanche River, La Loutre brook, McLeod brook;
- west side: Caron stream, Rouge River.

The Legendre River has its source on the northern slope of a mountain (summit at 550 metres (1,800 ft)) of Milan. This source is located in a forest zone north of route 214.

From its source, the river flows over:

- 2.2 kilometres (1.4 mi) west;
- 2.2 kilometres (1.4 mi) towards the north, up to the south shore of Petit lac Legendre (length: 0.8 metres (2 ft 7 in); altitude: 440 metres (1,440 ft)) that the current crosses towards the north, along its full length;
- 2.0 kilometres (1.2 mi) north, up to the municipal boundary between Milan and Saint-Romain;
- 7.6 kilometres (4.7 mi) north, to a stream (coming from the west);
- 1.6 kilometres (0.99 mi) east and north to the road, which it crosses at 1.1 kilometres (0.68 mi) southwest of the village center of Stornoway;
- 2.3 kilometres (1.4 mi) north-east, up to Legendre Flour Mill, where it crosses the road at 1.4 kilometres (0.87 mi) north-west of the village of Stornoway;
- 1.0 kilometre (0.62 mi) towards the northeast, up to the outlet (coming from the west) of Lake Legendre;
- 5.4 kilometres (3.4 mi) north-east, winding through Parc national de Frontenac, to its mouth.

The Legendre River empties on the west bank of the Felton River, at 0.4 kilometres (0.25 mi) upstream of the limit of Parc national de Frontenac and at 3.0 kilometres (1.9 mi) upstream of the confluence of the Sauvage River.

== Toponymy ==
The toponym "Rivière Legendre" was officially registered on December 5, 1968, at the Commission de toponymie du Québec.

== See also ==
- List of rivers of Quebec
