= Blanche River (Felton River tributary) =

River in Estrie, Quebec (Canada)

White River
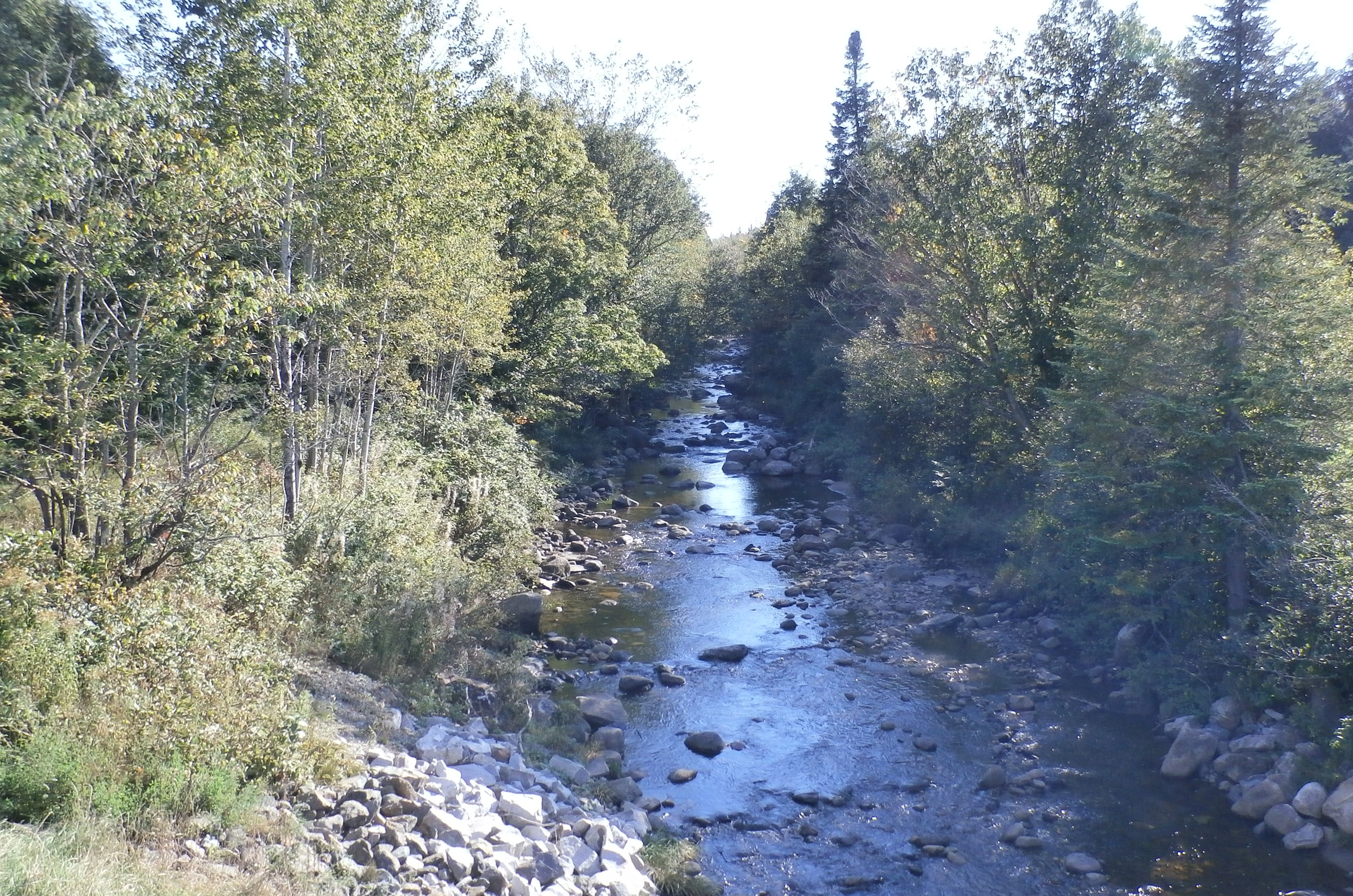
- Blanche River seen from Route 161 looking south.
- Native name: Rivière Blanche (French)

Location
- Country: Canada
- Province: Quebec
- Region: Estrie
- MRC: Le Granit Regional County Municipality
- Municipality: Milan, Nantes, MStornoway, Saint-Romain

Physical characteristics
- Source: Various streams
  - location: Milan
  - coordinates: 45.587253°N 71.156843°W
  - elevation: 498 m (1,634 ft)
- Mouth: Felton River
  - location: Saint-Romain
  - coordinates: 45.69588°N 71.09597°W
  - elevation: 361 m (1,184 ft)
- Length: 31.5 km (19.6 mi)

Basin features
- Progression: Saint-François River, St. Lawrence River
- Tributaries
  - left: (upstream)
  - right: (upstream)

The Blanche river (French: rivière Blanche, pronounced [ʁivjɛʁ blɑ̃ʃ], lit. 'White River') is a tributary of the Felton River which flows into the Baie Sauvage to the south of Grand lac Saint François which constitutes the head lake of the Saint-François River.

The course of the "Blanche River" crosses the territories of the municipalities of Milan, Nantes, Stornoway and Saint-Romain, in the Le Granit Regional County Municipality (MRC), in the administrative region of Estrie, on the Rive-South of the St. Lawrence River, in the province of Quebec, Canada.

== Geography ==
The main hydrographic slopes close to the "Blanche river" are:

- north side: Felton River, Grand lac Saint François;
- east side: Noire River, Glen River;
- south side: Turcotte stream;
- west side: Legendre River.

The Blanche River originates north of the village of Milan, on the north side of route 214.

The Blanche river flows over:

- 4.3 kilometres (2.7 mi) heading east along (on the north side) route 214;
- 5.4 kilometres (3.4 mi) northward, to the confluence of a stream (coming from the west);
- 1.6 kilometres (0.99 mi) north, to Chemin de la Yard;
- 6.3 kilometres (3.9 mi) northward, up to the municipal boundary between Milan and Nantes;
- 0.6 kilometres (0.37 mi) towards the north, in the municipality of Nantes;
- 5.6 kilometres (3.5 mi) north, up to route 161;
- 7.7 kilometres (4.8 mi) north, winding up to its mouth.

The Blanche River empties at the confluence of the Noire River which is the start of the Felton River.

== Toponymy ==
The toponym "rivière Blanche" was officially registered on December 18, 1979, at the Commission de toponymie du Québec.

== See also ==
- List of rivers of Quebec
