= Sauvage River (Felton River tributary) =

River in Estrie, Quebec, Canada

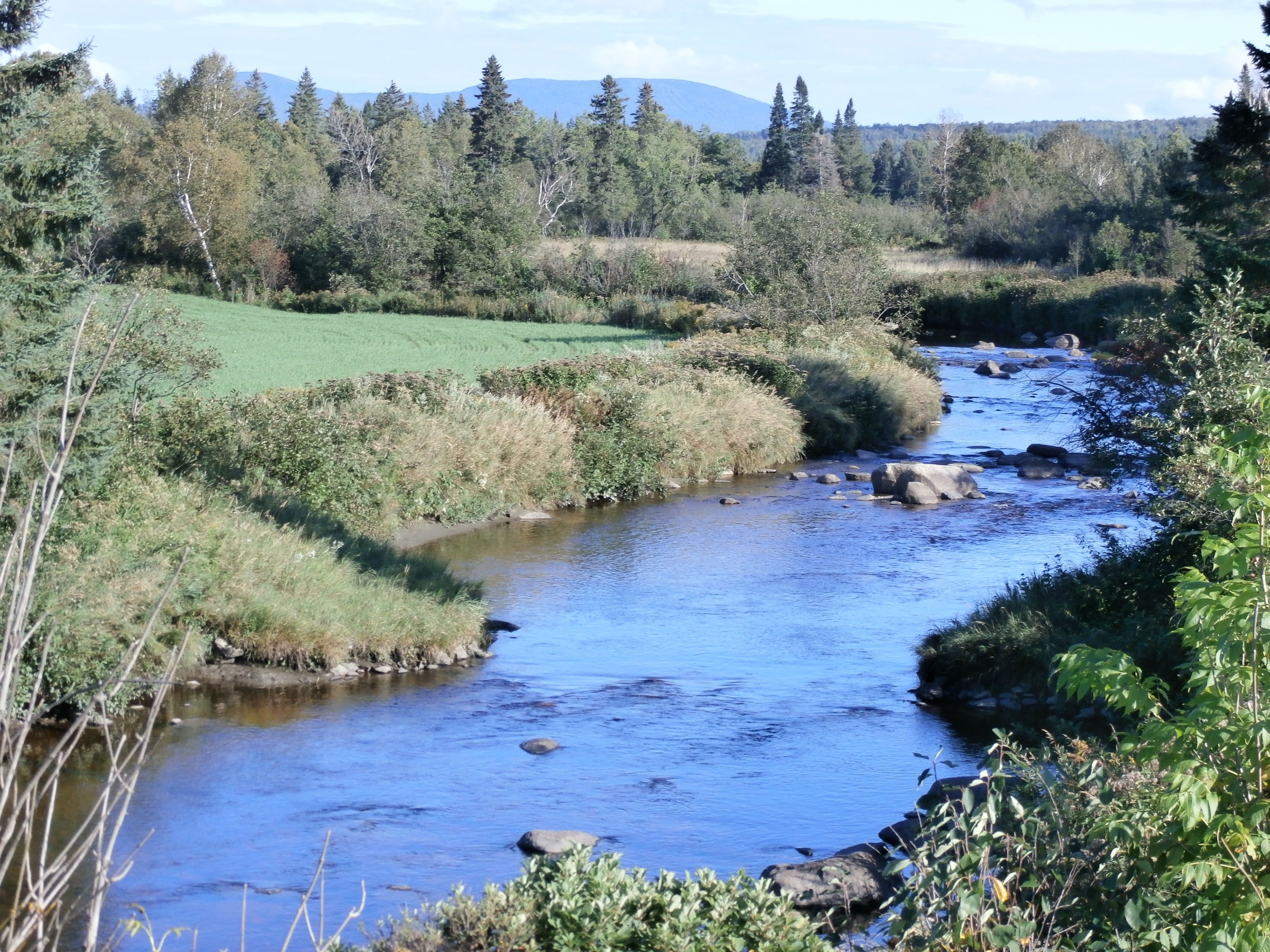
- Rivière Sauvage seen from the Highway 108 bridge looking east. The Mont Sainte-Cécile is in the background.
- Native name: Rivière Sauvage (French)

Location
- Country: Canada
- Province: Quebec
- Region: Estrie
- MRC: Le Granit Regional County Municipality
- Municipality: Sainte-Cécile-de-Whitton, Saint-Romain

Physical characteristics
- Source: Between Lac de la Souris and Lac à la Sangsue
  - location: Sainte-Cécile-de-Whitton
  - coordinates: 45.711968°N 70.950488°W
  - elevation: 513 m (1,683 ft)
- Mouth: Felton River
  - location: Saint-Romain
  - coordinates: 45.78056°N 71.13889°W
  - elevation: 291 m (955 ft)
- Length: 20.6 km (12.8 mi)

Basin features
- Progression: Saint-François River, St. Lawrence River
- Tributaries
  - left: (upstream) ruisseau au Castor, ruisseau de la Languette
  - right: (upstream) ruisseau Isabelle

The Sauvage River (in French: rivière Sauvage) is a tributary of the Felton River which flows into the Baie Sauvage to the south of Grand lac Saint François which constitutes the head lake of the Saint-François River.

The course of the Sauvage River crosses the territories of the municipalities of Sainte-Cécile-de-Whitton and Saint-Romain, Le Granit Regional County Municipality (MRC), in the administrative region of Estrie, on the South Shore of the St. Lawrence River, in Quebec, Canada.

== Geography ==
The main hydrographic slopes close to Sauvage River are:

- north side: Grand lac Saint François, Baie Sauvage;
- east side: Noire River, brook Rouge;
- south side: Blanche River;
- west side: Felton River, Legendre River.

The Sauvage River has its source in the municipality of Sainte-Cécile-de-Whitton, at the municipal limit with Lac-Drolet, which is separated by route 263. This head point of the river is located between "Lac à la Sangsue" (length: 0.8 kilometres (0.50 mi)) and Lac de la Souris, in a small valley on the eastern slope of "Montagne de the Craque". This place is located west of lake Mégantic, south of Grand lac Saint François, north of Mont Sainte-Cécile, north of the village of Sainte-Cécile-de-Whitton and southwest of route 263.

The Sauvage River generally flows in a forest area to the west. From "Lac à la Sangsue", the Sauvage river flows over:

- 9.1 kilometres (5.7 mi) north-west, then west, until the confluence with the Isabelle stream (coming from the north); in this segment, the course of the river bypasses "Montagne de la Craque" and runs along (on the south side) the route 263;
- 0.9 kilometres (0.56 mi) towards the south-west, up to the confluence of the Castor stream (coming from the south-east);
- 1.4 kilometres (0.87 mi) north-west, up to the confluence of the Languette stream (coming from the south);
- 4.8 kilometres (3.0 mi) north-west, up to route 108 which it crosses at 2.4 kilometres (1.5 mi) south of the center the village of Saint-Romain;
- 4.4 kilometres (2.7 mi) north-west, to its mouth.

The Sauvage River empties on the east bank of the Felton River opposite the limit of Parc national de Frontenac, at 1.1 kilometres (0.68 mi) upstream from the mouth of the Felton River.

== Toponymy ==
Formerly, this watercourse was designated "Indian river".

The toponym "Rivière Sauvage" was officially registered on April 4, 1979, at the Commission de toponymie du Québec.

== See also ==
- List of rivers of Quebec
