= Felton River =

River in Estrie, Quebec (Canada)

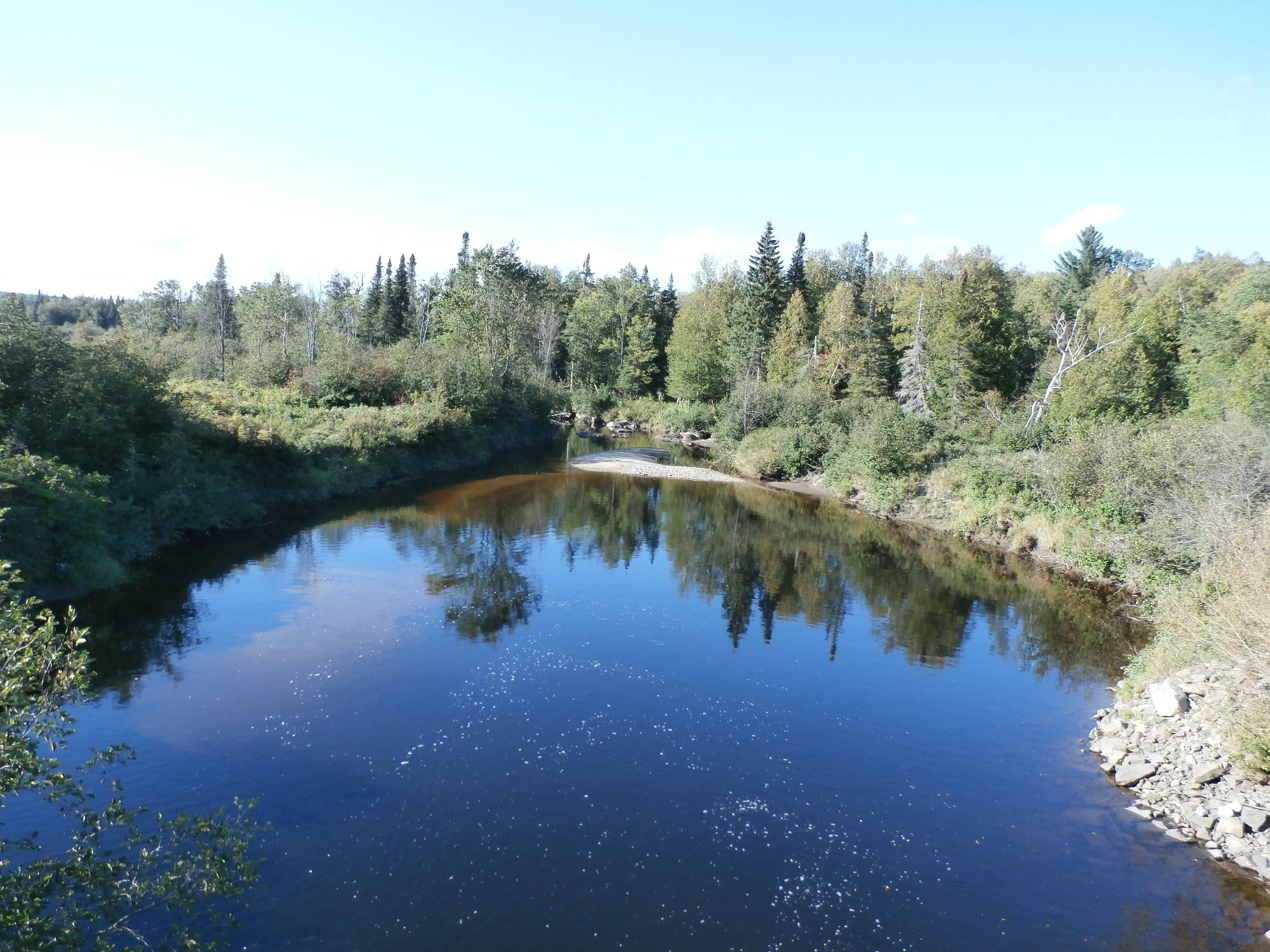
- Felton River seen from Highway 108 north towards Baie Sauvage.
- Native name: Rivière Felton (French)

Location
- Country: Canada
- Province: Quebec
- Region: Estrie
- MRC: Le Haut-Saint-François Regional County Municipality
- Municipality: Weedon

Physical characteristics
- Source: Confluence of Noire River and Blanche River
  - location: Saint-Romain
  - coordinates: 45.689828°N 71.109101°W
  - elevation: 361 m (1,184 ft)
- Mouth: Grand lac Saint François
  - location: Saint-Romain
  - coordinates: 45.78861°N 71.14222°W
  - elevation: 289 m (948 ft)
- Length: 14.3 km (8.9 mi)

Basin features
- Progression: Saint-François River, St. Lawrence River
- Tributaries
  - left: (upstream) Legendre River, Blanche River
  - right: (upstream) Sauvage River, Noire River

The rivière Felton is a tributary of Grand lac Saint François which constitutes the head lake of the Saint-François River. The course of the "Felton River" crosses the territory of the municipality of Saint-Romain, in the Le Granit Regional County Municipality (MRC), in the administrative region of Estrie, on the South Shore of the St. Lawrence River, in Quebec, Canada.

== Geography ==
The main neighboring hydrographic slopes of "Felton river" are:

- north side: Grand lac Saint François, Baie Sauvage;
- east side: Noire River (Felton River tributary), brook Rouge;
- south side: Sauvage River (Felton River tributary), Blanche River (Felton River tributary);
- west side: Legendre River.

The Felton River rises at the confluence of the Noire River and Blanche River, in the southern part of the Municipality of Saint-Romain. This confluence is located at 2.0 kilometres (1.2 mi) northwest of the boundary between the municipalities of Nantes and Saint-Romain.

From this confluence, the Felton River meanders on 7.7 kilometres (4.8 mi) towards the north-west, crossing route 108, until its confluence with Legendre River (coming from the west); on 5.5 kilometres (3.4 mi) north to its confluence with the Sauvage River (Felton River tributary) (coming from the east); 1.1 kilometres (0.68 mi) north to its mouth.

The Felton River constitutes the demarcation between the municipality of Saint-Romain and Stornoway. In addition, this river constitutes the eastern limit of Parc national de Frontenac. The Felton River flows onto the south shore of Baie Sauvage which is an extension of Grand lac Saint François.

== Toponymy ==
The term "Felton" is a family name of English origin. This term also refers to municipalities in United Kingdom, United States and Canada.

The toponym "Rivière Felton" was officially registered on December 5, 1968, at the Commission de toponymie du Québec.

== See also ==
- Saint-François River, a stream
- Sauvage River, a stream
- Noire River, a stream
- Blanche River, a stream
- Legendre River, a stream
- Grand lac Saint François, a body of water
- Le Granit Regional County Municipality (MRC)
- Saint-Romain, a municipality
- Stornoway, a municipality
- Parc national de Frontenac, a protected area
- List of rivers of Quebec
