= Noire River (Felton River tributary) =

River in Estrie, Quebec, Canada

Noire River Rivière Whitton
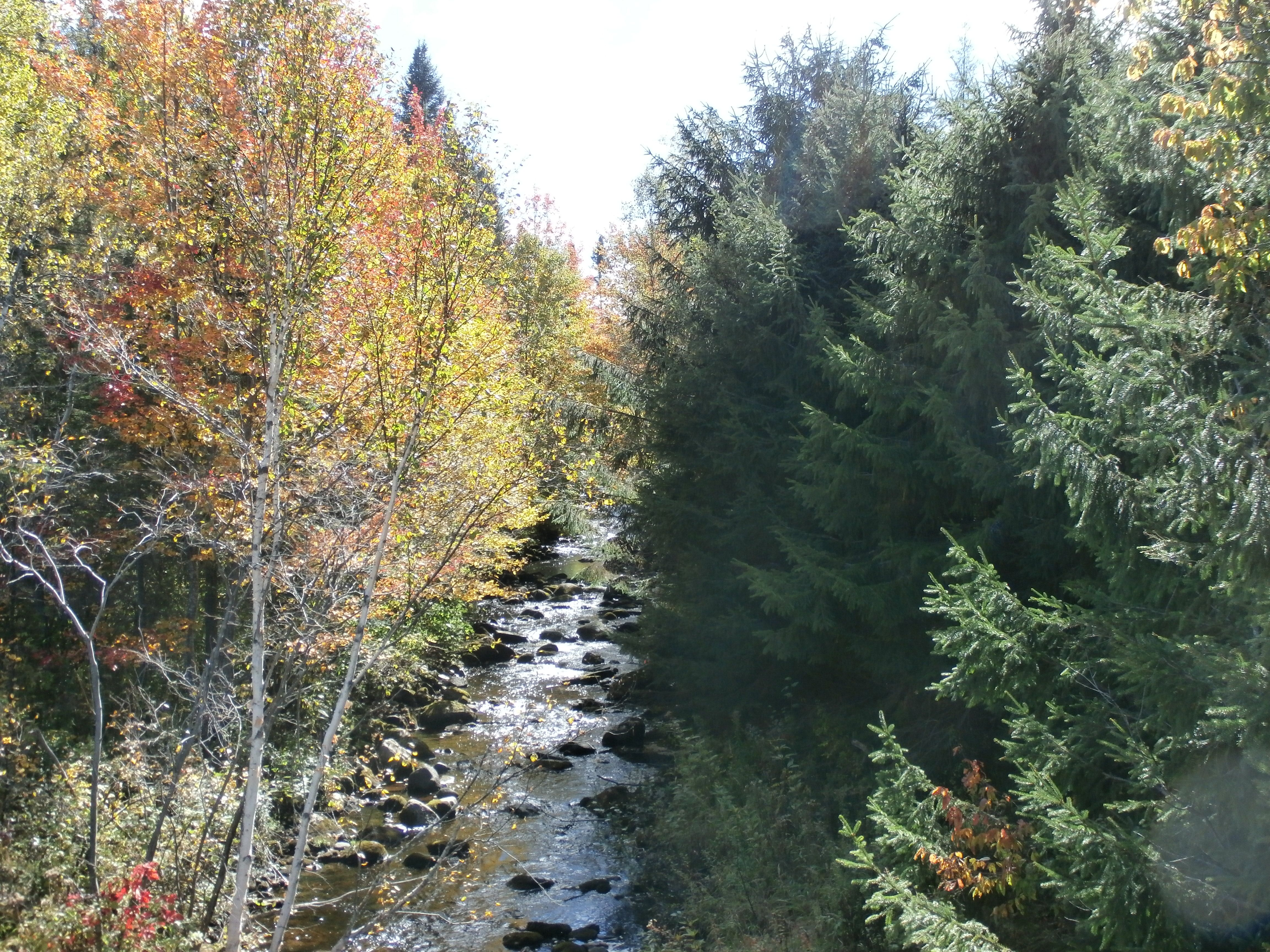
- Black River south of Route 161. Former name: Whitton River.
- Native name: Rivière Noire (French)

Location
- Country: Canada
- Province: Quebec
- Region: Estrie
- MRC: Le Granit Regional County Municipality
- Municipality: Sainte-Cécile-de-Whitton, Saint-Romain

Physical characteristics
- Source: Lake Whitton
  - location: Nantes
  - coordinates: 45.625237°N 71.067778°W
  - elevation: 471 m (1,545 ft)
- Mouth: Felton River
  - location: Saint-Romain
  - coordinates: 45.69556°N 71.09639°W
  - elevation: 361 m (1,184 ft)
- Length: 8.4 km (5.2 mi)

Basin features
- Progression: Saint-François River, St. Lawrence River
- Tributaries
  - left: (upstream)
  - right: (upstream)

The Noire River (in French: Rivière Noire) is a tributary of the Felton River which flows into Baie Sauvage south of Grand lac Saint François which constitutes the head lake of the Saint-François River.

The course of the "Black River" crosses the municipalities of Nantes and Saint-Romain, in the Le Granit Regional County Municipality (MRC), in the administrative region of Estrie, on the South Shore of the St. Lawrence River, in Quebec, Canada.

== Geography ==
The main neighboring hydrographic slopes of the "Black River" are:

- north side: Sauvage River (Felton River), Grand lac Saint François;
- east side: Sauvage River (Felton River);
- south side: Gunn stream, Victoria River (Mégantic lake), Turcotte stream;
- west side: Felton River

The Black River has its source at Whitton Lake whose southern area is made up of marshes.

From Whitton Lake, the course of the Noire River heads north, crossing route 161 South. It first flows over 6.1 kilometres (3.8 mi), until a stream coming from the east; then 2.3 kilometres (1.4 mi) west to the mouth.

The Black River empties on the east bank of the Felton River, at the confluence of the Blanche River, east of route 161 South.

== Toponymy ==
Formerly, this watercourse was known as "Whitton River".

The toponym "Rivière Noire" was officially registered on December 18, 1979, at the Commission de toponymie du Québec.

== See also ==
- List of rivers of Quebec
