= Legendre Flour Mill =

Building in Quebec, Canada

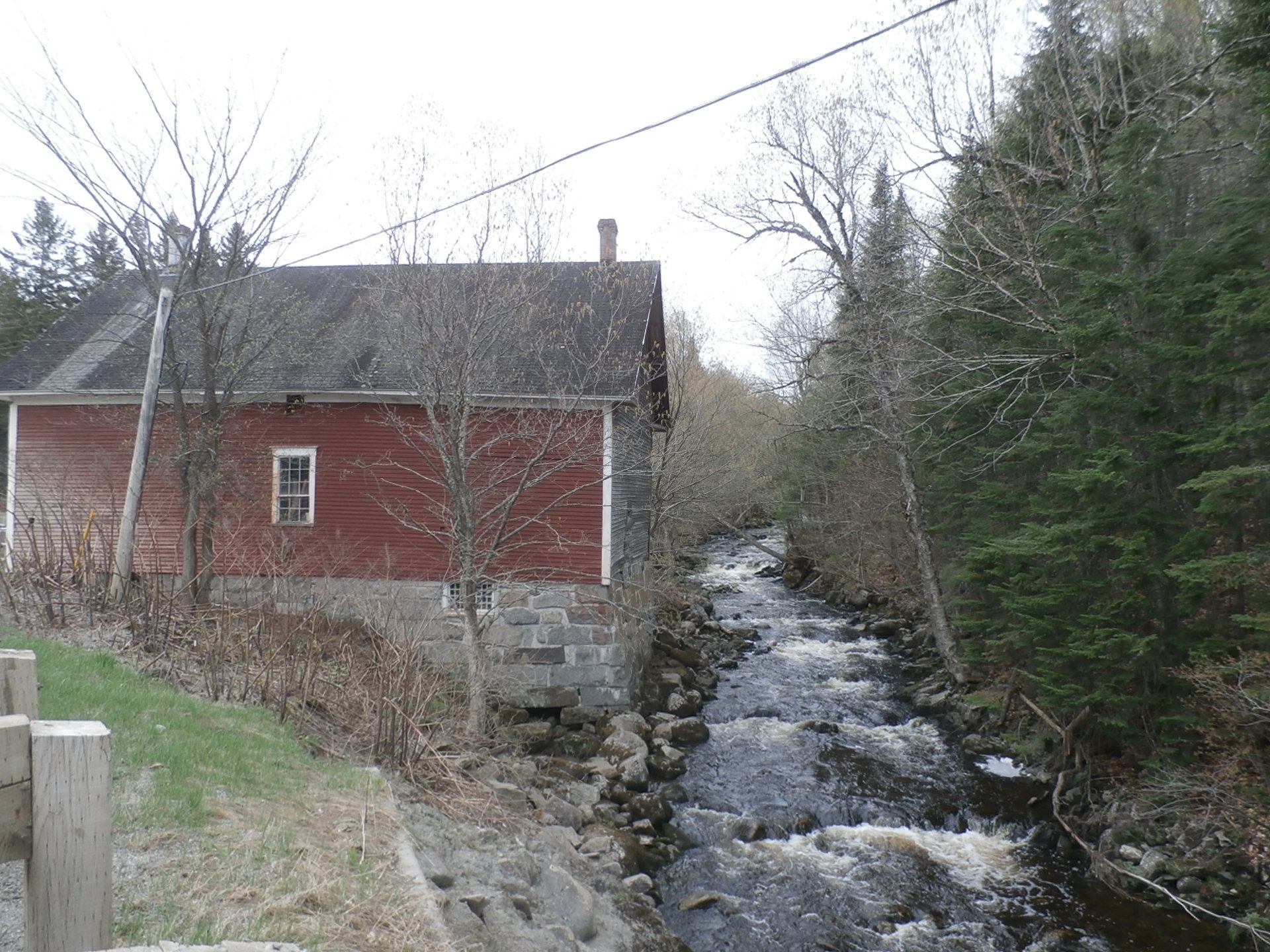
- Legendre family flour mill. Legendre Bros. 1883.
- Architectural style: Greek Revival architecture
- Location: Canada, Quebec, Estrie, Le Granit Regional County Municipality
- Coordinates: 45°43′05″N 71°10′16″W

Construction
- Renovated: <! or re-equipment_date_1 -->

The Legendre Flour Mill (in English: Legendre Mill) is located in Stornoway, in Estrie. Built in 1883 by Télésphore Legendre, it is one of the last water mills in Quebec, Canada. He stopped grinding flour around 1940. Another mill existed in the same place before 1883.

== Identification ==
- Building name: Legendre water mill
- Watercourse:Legendre River
- Civic address:Route 161 (south side, 1.3 kilometres (0.81 mi) northwest of the village)
- Municipality:Stornoway
- Private property

== History ==
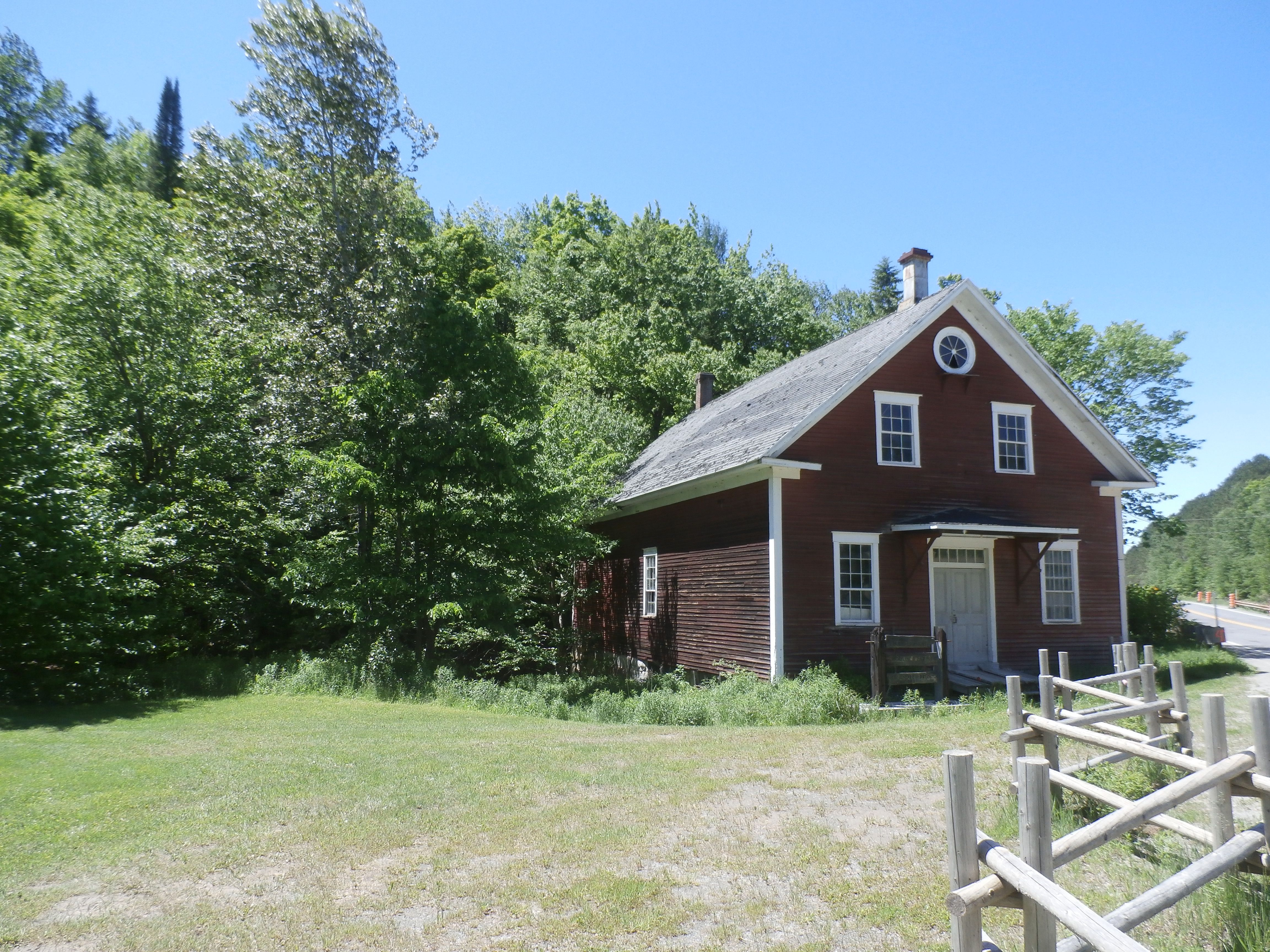
Moulin Legendre in Stornoway.

The Legendre mill was rebuilt following a fire which destroyed the Legendre family home as well as their carding, fulling and flour mills. The flour mill was rebuilt the same year as well as their other buildings. It is mainly used for local production, which is relatively low given the altitude of the village and the low production capacity of the land. He produced until the 1940s, when it became easier to buy flour than to produce it. The latter survives compared to the other mills, which were demolished in the 1950s. The Legendre mill was cited Historic monument by the municipality of Stornoway on May 5, 2008, in Quebec.

== See also ==
- Grain mill
