= Quebec Route 161 =

Highway in Quebec, Canada

Route 161

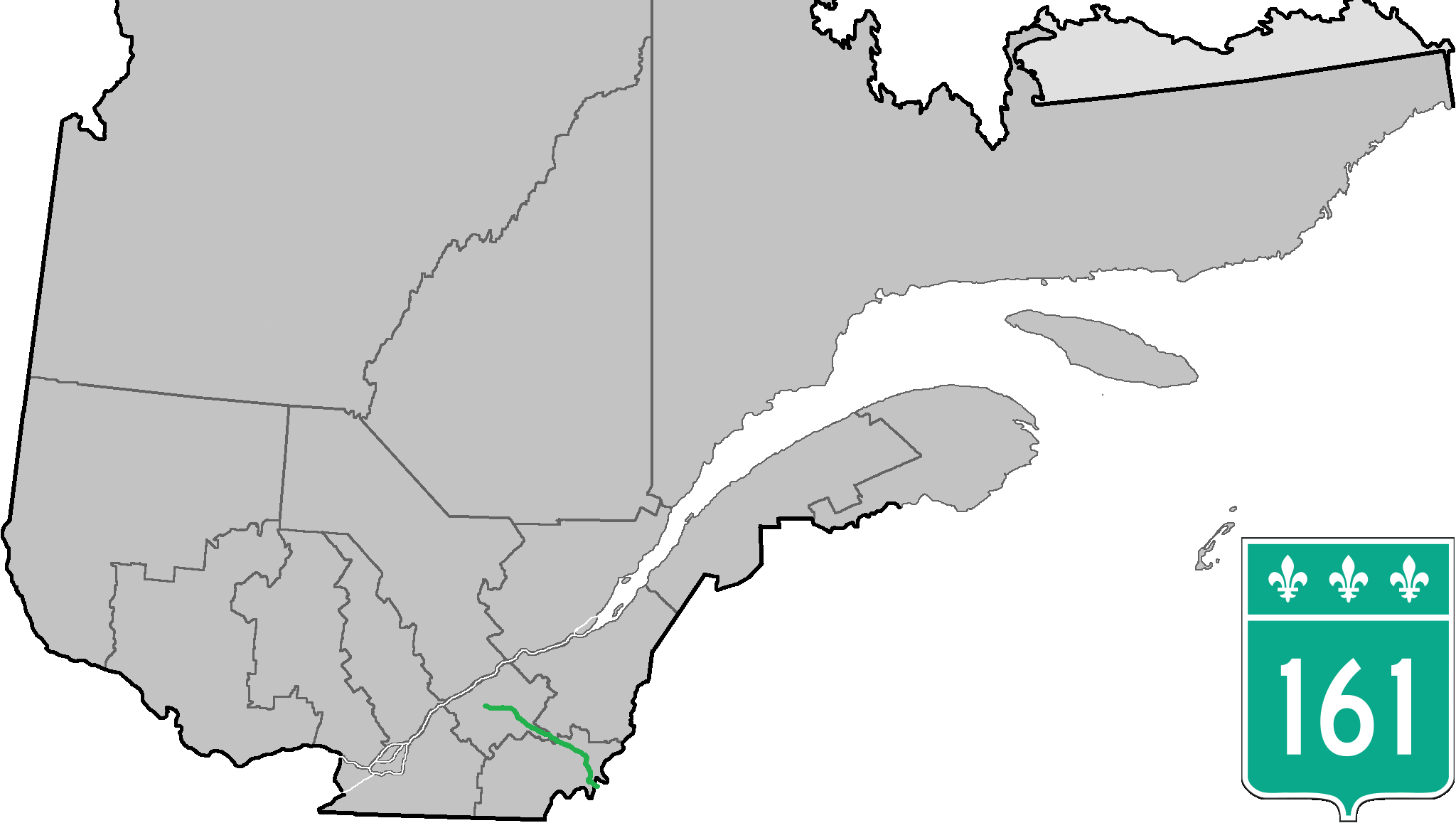

Route information
- Maintained by Transports Québec
- Length: 185.1 km (115.0 mi) Pre-2006: 205.5 km (127.7 mi)
- History: Route 34

Major junctions
- South end: SR 27 at the U.S. border near Saint-Augustin-de-Woburn
- R-108 in Stornoway; R-112 in Weedon & Beaulac-Garthby; R-116 / R-122 / R-162 in Victoriaville
- North end: A-20 (TCH) in Sainte-Eulalie

Location
- Country: Canada
- Province: Quebec
- Major cities: Victoriaville

Highway system
- Quebec provincial highways; Autoroutes; List; Former
← R-159	→ R-162

Route 161 is a north–south highway south of the St. Lawrence River in the regions of Centre-du-Québec, Chaudière-Appalaches and Estrie in the province of Quebec, Canada. Its current northern terminus is at Autoroute 20 in Sainte-Eulalie, just east of the junction of Autoroute 55, while its southern terminus is at the border of Maine in the US, where it continues as Maine State Route 27. Previously the highway continued to Route 155 in Saint-Célestin, but that section was decommissioned in 2006 when Autoroute 55 was completed.

On July 6, 2013, the route was severed at Lac-Mégantic, Quebec by an oil train derailment. Ministry of Transport consultants began surveying a site for a new bridge across the Chaudière River in August 2013.

== Municipalities along Route 161 ==
- Saint-Augustin-de-Woburn
- Frontenac
- Lac-Mégantic
- Nantes
- Stornoway
- Stratford
- Weedon
- Beaulac-Garthby
- Saints-Martyrs-Canadiens
- Ham-Nord
- Notre-Dame-de-Ham
- Chesterville
- Saint-Christophe d'Arthabaska
- Victoriaville
- Saint-Valère
- Saint-Samuel
- Sainte-Eulalie

== Major intersections ==
RCM	Location	km	mi	Destinations	Notes
Le Granit	Saint-Augustin-de-Woburn	0.0	0.0	SR 27 south – Coburn Gore, Farmington	Continuation into Maine
Le Granit	Saint-Augustin-de-Woburn	0.0	0.0	Canada–United States border at Coburn Gore–Woburn Border Crossing	
Le Granit	Saint-Augustin-de-Woburn	4.4	2.7	R-212 west – Notre-Dame-des-Bois, Cookshire	
Le Granit	Saint-Augustin-de-Woburn	8.1	5.0	R-263 north – Piopolis	
Le Granit	Lac-Mégantic	31.3	19.4	Rue Frontenac	Former R-161 north
Le Granit	Lac-Mégantic	33.3	20.7	R-204 east – Saint-Georges	
Le Granit	Lac-Mégantic	35.5	22.1	Rue Villeneuve	Interchange
Le Granit	Nantes	41.3	25.7	R-263 south / Rue Laval – Lac-Mégantic, Piopolis	Roundabout; former R-161 south; south end of R-263 concurrency
Le Granit	Nantes	43.2	26.8	R-263 north – Sainte-Cécile-de-Whitton, Saint-Sébastien	North end of R-263 concurrency
Le Granit	Nantes	49.6	30.8	R-214 west – Milan, Scotstown	
Le Granit	Stornoway	63.6	39.5	R-108 – Sherbrooke, Lambton	
Le Haut-Saint-François	Weedon	89.5	55.6	R-112 west – Sherbrooke	South end of R-112 concurrency
Les Appalaches	Beaulac-Garthby	96.9	60.2	R-112 east – Thetford Mines	North end of R-112 concurrency
Arthabaska	Ham-Nord	115.5	71.8	R-216 east – Saint-Fortunat	South end of R-216 concurrency
Arthabaska	Ham-Nord	120.9	75.1	R-112 west – Saint-Adrien, Val-des-Sources	North end of R-216 concurrency
Arthabaska	Saint-Christophe-d'Arthabaska	150.9	93.8	R-116 west – Warwick	South end of R-116 concurrency
Arthabaska	Victoriaville	152.7	94.9	Boulevard des Bois-Francs – Centre-Ville	
Arthabaska	Victoriaville	154.4	95.9	Boulevard Jutras	
Arthabaska	Victoriaville	157.2	97.7	R-116 east / R-122 begins – Princeville, Plessisville	R-122 eastern terminus; north end of R-116 concurrency; south end of R-122 concurrency
Arthabaska	Victoriaville	161.8	100.5	R-162 north – Saint-Rosaire, Saint-Louis-de-Blandford	
Arthabaska	Victoriaville	164.7	102.3	R-122 west to A-20 / A-955 / Boulevard Jutras – Saint-Albert, Drummondville	North end of R-122 concurrency
Arthabaska	Saint-Valère	176.7	109.8	R-261 north – Daveluyville	
Nicolet-Yamaska	Sainte-Eulalie	185.1	115.0	A-20 (TCH) / A-55 – Québec, Trois-Rivières, Montréal	R-161 northern terminus; A-20 exit 210
Nicolet-Yamaska	Saint-Célestin	204.7	127.2	R-226 east – Sainte-Gertrude	Former south end of R-266 concurrency
Nicolet-Yamaska	Saint-Célestin	205.5	127.7	A-55 north / R-155 / R-226 west – Trois-Rivières, Saint-Célestin, Saint-Léonard-d'Aston, Sainte-Monique	Former A-55 southern terminus (Trois-Rivières section); former R-161 northern terminus
1.000 mi = 1.609 km; 1.000 km = 0.621 mi: Closed/former; Concurrency terminus

== See also ==
- List of Quebec provincial highways
