= Quebec Route 108 =

Highway in Quebec, Canada

Route 108

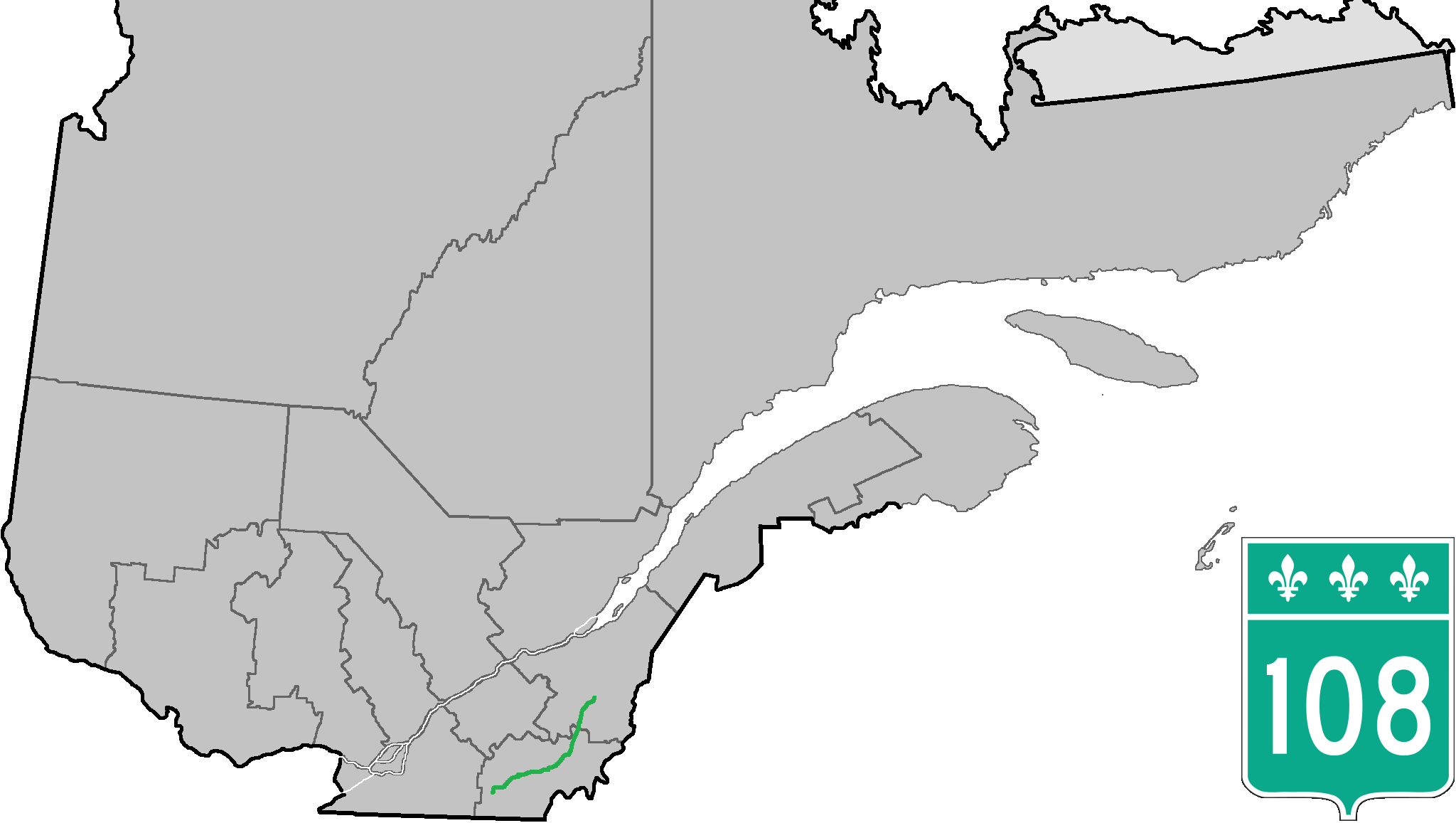

Route information
- Maintained by Transports Québec
- Length: 177.9 km (110.5 mi)
- History: Route 28

Major junctions
- West end: R-112 in Magog
- A-55 in Magog; R-216 in Sainte-Catherine-de-Hatley; R-143 / R-147 / R-251 in Sherbrooke; R-210 in Cookshire-Eaton; R-212 / R-253 in Cookshire-Eaton; R-214 / R-255 in Bury; R-257 in Lingwick; R-161 in Stornoway; R-263 in Lambton; R-269 in La Guadeloupe
- East end: R-173 in Beauceville

Location
- Country: Canada
- Province: Quebec
- Major cities: Sherbrooke, Magog, Beauceville

Highway system
- Quebec provincial highways; Autoroutes; List; Former
← R-107	→ R-109

Route 108 is a two-lane east/west highway on the south shore of the Saint Lawrence River in the Eastern Townships and Chaudière-Appalaches regions of Quebec, Canada. Its eastern terminus is in Beauceville at the junction of Route 173, and the western terminus is at the junction of Route 112 in Magog.

== Municipalities along Route 108 ==
- Magog
- Sainte-Catherine-de-Hatley
- Hatley
- North Hatley
- Waterville
- Sherbrooke
- Cookshire-Eaton
- Newport
- Westbury
- Bury
- Lingwick
- Stornoway
- Saint-Romain
- Lambton
- Courcelles-Saint-Évariste
- La Guadeloupe
- Saint-Éphrem-de-Beauce
- Saint-Victor
- Saint-Alfred
- Beauceville

== Major intersections ==
RCM or ET	Municipality	km	Junction	Notes
Western terminus of Route 108
Memphrémagog	Magog	0.0	R-112	112 WEST: to Orford; 112 EAST: to Omerville
Memphrémagog	Magog	5.7; 5.9	A-55 (Exit 29)	55 SOUTH: to Sainte-Catherine-de-Hatley; 55 NORTH: to Omerville
Memphrémagog	Sainte-Catherine-de-Hatley	12.5	R-216 (West end)	216 EAST: to Sherbrooke
Coaticook	Waterville	26.7	R-143 (Overlap 5.9 km)	143 SOUTH: to Hatley
Sherbrooke	Sherbrooke	30.0	R-147 (North end)	147 SOUTH: to Compton
Sherbrooke	Sherbrooke	32.6	R-143 (Overlap 5.9 km)	143 NORTH: to Sherbrooke
Sherbrooke	Sherbrooke	37.6	R-251 (North end)	251 SOUTH: to Martinville
Le Haut-Saint-François	Cookshire-Eaton	48.8	R-210 (West end)	210 EAST: to Newport
Le Haut-Saint-François	Cookshire-Eaton	53.8	R-253	253 SOUTH: to Saint-Isidore-de-Clifton; 253 NORTH: to Westbury
Le Haut-Saint-François	Cookshire-Eaton	54.1	R-212 (West end)	212 EAST: to Newport
Le Haut-Saint-François	Bury	61.9; 63.4	R-214 (Overlap 1.5 km)	214 WEST: to East Angus; 214 EAST: to Scotstown
Le Haut-Saint-François	Bury	66.9	R-255	255 NORTH: to Dudswell
Le Haut-Saint-François	Lingwick	82.9	R-257	257 SOUTH: to Scotstown; 257 NORTH: to Weedon
Le Granit	Stornoway	105.5	R-161	161 SOUTH: to Nantes; 161 NORTH: to Stratford
Le Granit	Lambton	120.1; 122.1	R-263 (Overlap 2.0 km)	263 NORTH: to Sainte-Praxède; 263 SOUTH: to Saint-Sébastien
Beauce-Sartigan	La Guadeloupe	140.7	R-269 (Overlap 5.4 km)	269 SOUTH: to Saint-Honoré-de-Shenley
Beauce-Sartigan	Saint-Éphrem-de-Beauce	146.1	R-269 (Overlap 5.4 km)	269 NORTH: to Adstock
Beauce-Sartigan	Saint-Éphrem-de-Beauce	152.6	R-271	271 SOUTH: to Saint-Benoît-Labre; 271 NORTH: to Sainte-Clotilde-de-Beauce
Beauce-Sartigan	Beauceville	177.9	R-173	173 SOUTH: to Notre-Dame-des-Pins; 173 NORTH: to Saint-Joseph-de-Beauce
Eastern terminus of Route 108

== See also ==
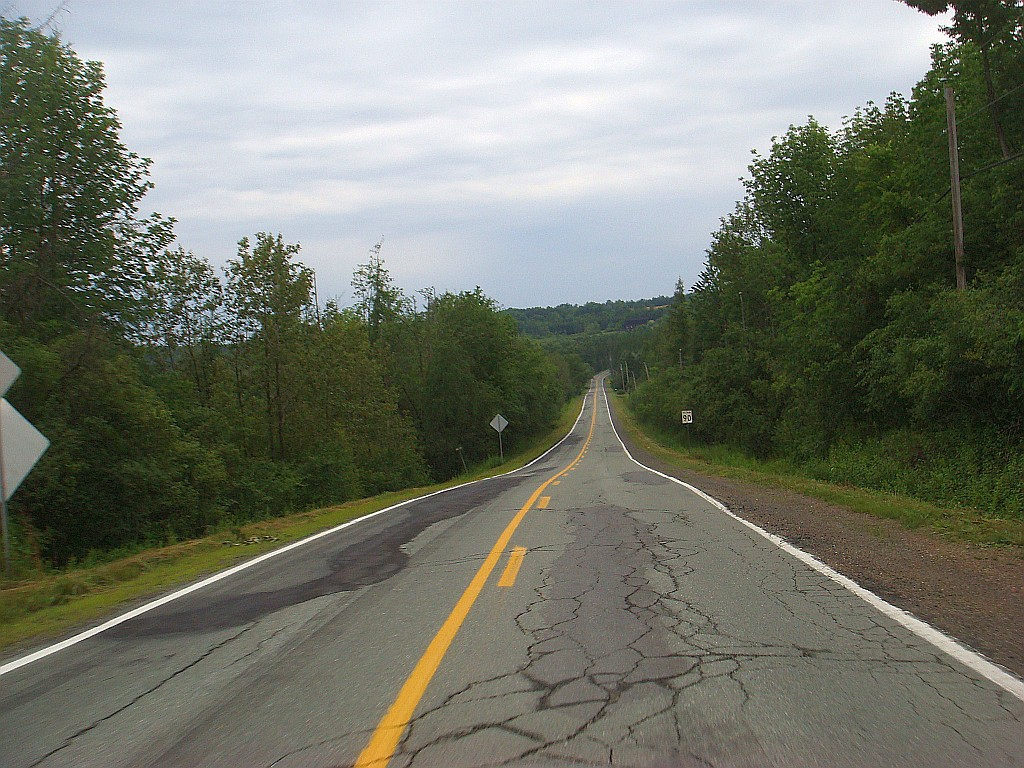
Route 108 near North Hatley, Quebec

- List of Quebec provincial highways
