= Village-relais =

A Village-relais (Quebec, pronounced [vilaʒ ʁəlɛ]) is a small town, typically under ten thousand people, designated to provide a complete set of services for national or provincial highway travellers. While most do provide natural or cultural landmarks, activities or attractions in some form, the core requirements address quality or hours of operation for amenities such as restaurants, grocers, lodging and tourist information. The scheme was formed in 2009.

Quebec's program is based on the original French "Village étape". The criteria for a Village-relais, as defined by Transports Québec, the provincial transport ministry (MTQ) are;

A village-relais may appear en route along any numbered Quebec highway (not just a limited access "autoroute") but must offer at least the following:

- Restaurant
- Fuel, auto repair and towing
- Lodging
- Grocer, cash machine, toilets, public telephone
- Parking
- RV dump station, tourist info and wi-fi

Minimum hours of operation for each service are specified for each of high season and off-season travel.

== Current villages-relais ==
As of May 2026:

- Abitibi-Témiscamingue
  - La Sarre
  - Senneterre
  - Témiscaming
- Bas-Saint-Laurent
  - Dégelis
  - La Pocatière
  - Pohénégamook
- Capitale-Nationale
  - Baie-Saint-Paul
  - Deschambault-Grondines
  - Saint-Siméon
- Chaudière-Appalaches
  - Lac-Etchemin
  - La Guadeloupe
  - Saint-Damien-de-Buckland
  - Saint-Frédéric
- Centre-du-Québec
  - Nicolet
- Côte-Nord
  - Aguanish
  - Forestville
  - Les Escoumins
  - Natashquan
  - Port-Cartier
  - Rivière-au-Tonnerre
  - Sacré-Coeur
- Estrie
  - Coaticook
  - Danville
  - Stanstead
  - Stornoway
- Gaspésie–Îles-de-la-Madeleine
  - Amqui
  - Cap-Chat
  - Chandler
  - Mont-Joli
  - New Richmond
  - Paspébiac
  - Pointe-à-la-Croix
  - Rivière-au-Renard
  - Saint-Maxime-du-Mont-Louis
- Laurentides–Lanaudière
  - Brownsburg-Chatham
  - Labelle
  - Lac-des-Écorces
  - Saint-Donat
  - Sainte-Émélie-de-l'Énergie
- Mauricie
  - Sainte-Thècle
  - Yamachiche
- Montérégie
  - Acton Vale
- Nord-du-Québec
  - Chapais
- Outaouais
  - Fort-Coulonge/Mansfield
  - Maniwaki
  - Montebello
  - Val-des-Bois
- Saguenay–Lac-Saint-Jean
  - Hébertville
  - Lac-Bouchette
  - La Doré
  - L'Anse-Saint-Jean
  - Saint-Fulgence
