= Sainte-Eulalie, Quebec =

Sainte-Eulalie
- Municipality
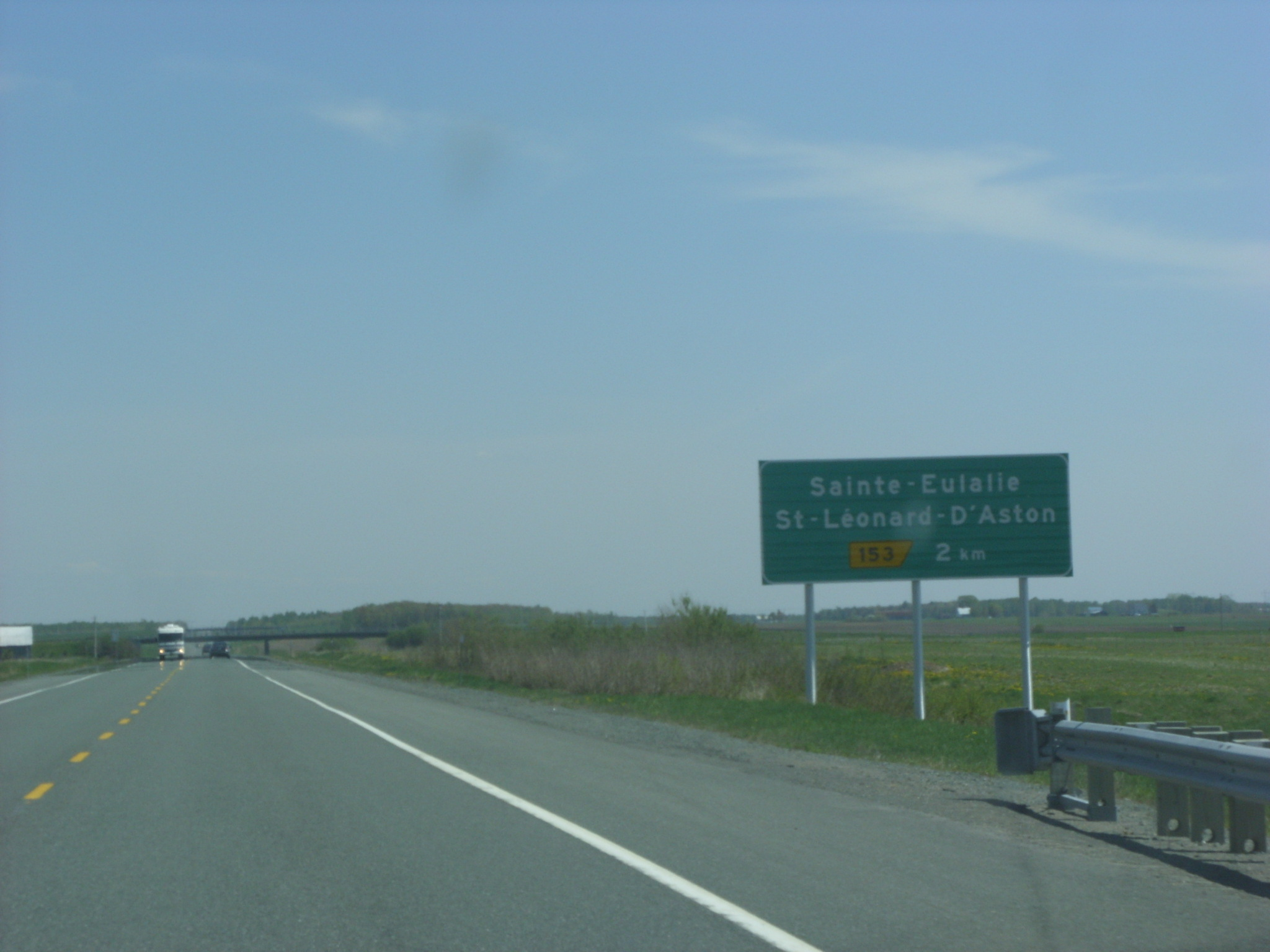
- Highway 55 in Sainte-Eulalie

- Coat of arms

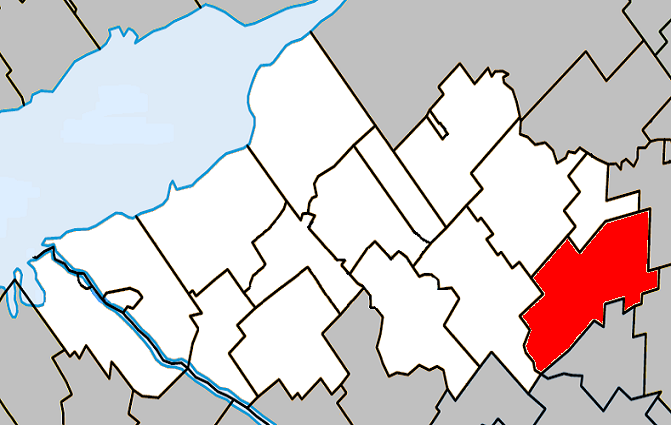
- Location within Nicolet-Yamaska RCM.

- Location in southern Quebec.
- Coordinates: 46°06′N 72°15′W
- Country: Canada
- Province: Quebec
- Region: Centre-du-Québec
- RCM: Nicolet-Yamaska
- Constituted: July 1, 1864

Government
  - Mayor: Gilles Bédard
  - Federal riding: Bécancour—Nicolet—Saurel—Alnôbak
  - Prov. riding: Nicolet-Bécancour

Area \
  - Total: 86.00 km^{2} (33.20 sq mi)
  - Land: 86.30 km^{2} (33.32 sq mi)
- There is an apparent contradiction between two authoritative sources

Population (2021)
  - Total: 984
  - Density: 11.4/km^{2} (30/sq mi)
  - Pop 2016-2021: ▲10.1%
  - Dwellings: 448
- Time zone: UTC−5 (EST)
  - Summer (DST): UTC−4 (EDT)
- Postal code(s): G0Z 1E0
- Area code: 819
- Highways A-20 (TCH) A-55 A-955: R-161
- Website: www.municipalite. sainte-eulalie.qc.ca

Sainte-Eulalie (French pronunciation: [sɛ̃t ølali]) is a municipality in the Nicolet-Yamaska RCM in the Centre-du-Québec region of Quebec, Canada, situated at the crossroads of Autoroutes 55, 20 and 955. The population as of the Canada 2021 Census was 984.

Sainte-Eulalie is also the home of Hydro-Québec's Nicolet static inverter station along Autoroute 20, west of its junction with Autoroute 55, as part of its HVDC Quebec - New England Transmission circuit.

== Demographics ==
=== Population ===
Population trend:

Census	Population	Change (%)
2021	984	▲10.1%
2016	894	▲2.6%
2011	871	▼2.6%
2006	894	▲1.1%
2001	884	▲0.6%
1996	879	▲7.9%
1991	815	▼2.4%
1986	835	▼1.8%
1981	850	▲0.1%
1976	849	▼5.7%
1971	900	▲6.9%
1966	842	▼11.7%
1961	954	▲0.5%
1956	949	▲3.9%
1951	913	▼1.4%
1941	926	▼2.5%
1931	950	▼13.0%
1921	1,092	▼11.1%
1911	1,228	▲8.4%
1901	1,133	▲27.2%
1891	891	▲8.0%
1881	825	▲216.1%
1871	261	N/A

=== Language ===
Mother tongue language (2021)

Language	Population	Pct (%)
French only	950	96.4%
English only	10	1.0%
Both English and French	5	0.5%
Other languages	15	1.5%

== See also ==
- List of municipalities in Quebec
