= Whitton Lake =

Lake in Nantes, Quebec, Canada

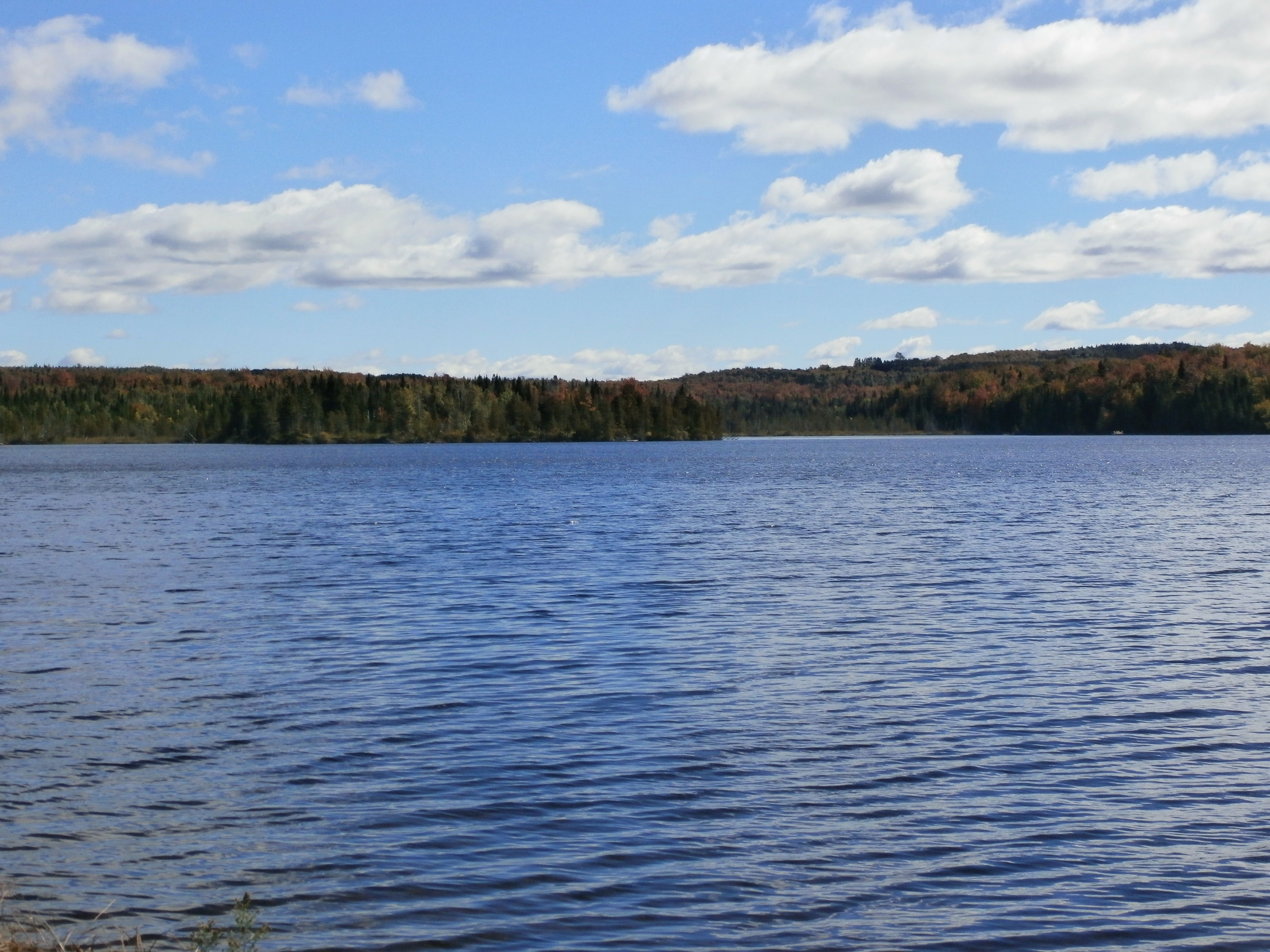
- Lake Whitton seen from the public access to Nantes

- Location within Quebec
- Location: Nantes, Estrie, Quebec, Canada
- Coordinates: 45.6308°N 71.0484°W
- Primary outflows: Noire River
- Max. length: 1.5 kilometres (0.93 mi)
- Max. width: 0.75 kilometres (0.47 mi)
- Average depth: 2 metres (6 ft 7 in)
- Surface elevation: 487 metres (1,598 ft)

The lake Whitton is a lake located near the village of Nantes in Estrie. It is the source of the Noire River, a tributary of Grand lac Saint François and a sub-tributary of the St. Lawrence River.

== Geography ==
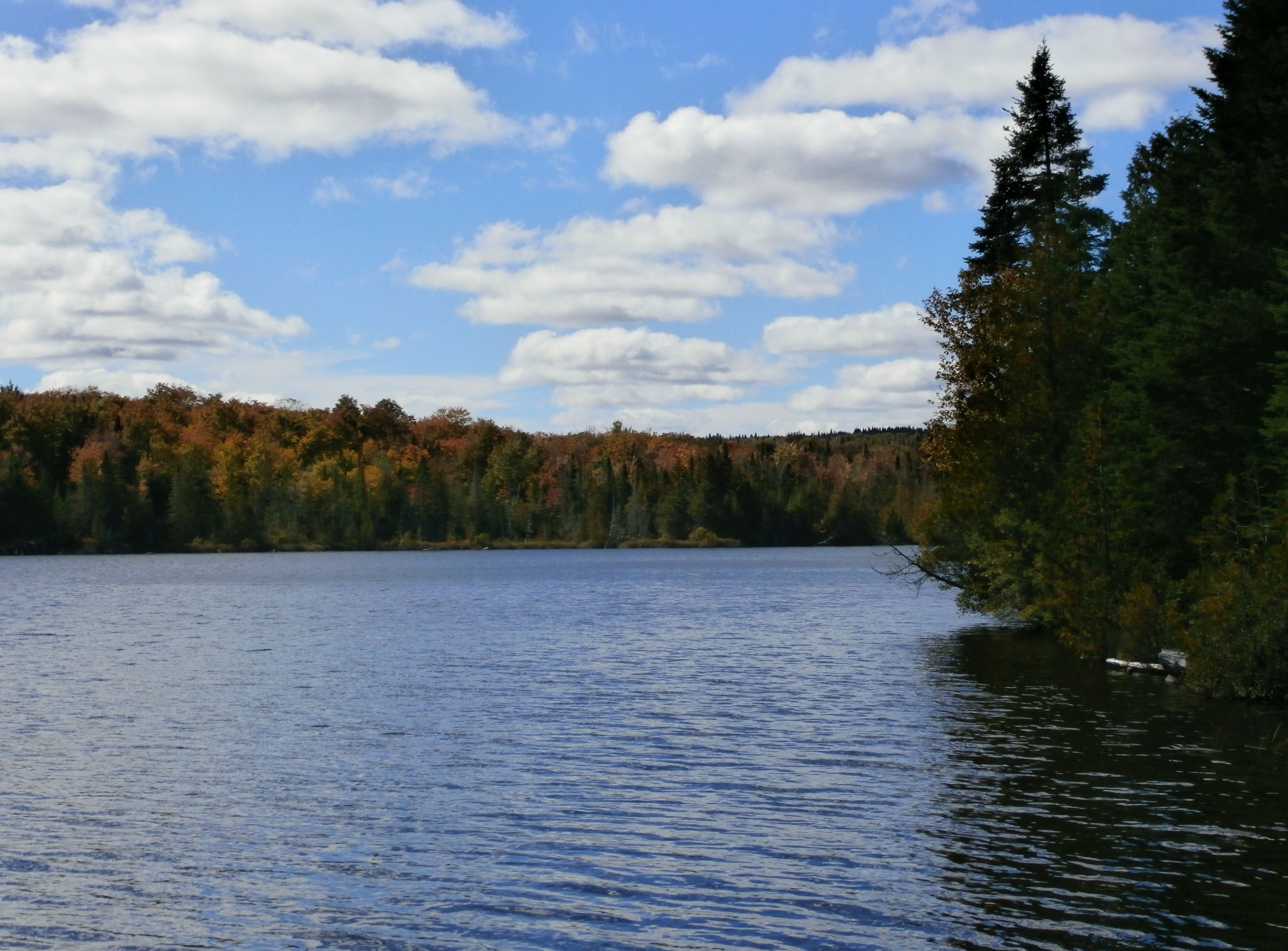
Lake Whitton seen towards the west

Its maximum approximate depth is 2 metres (6 ft 7 in), its width is 750 meters (2,460 ft) and its length is 1.5 kilometres (0.93 mi). Even if the lake is located only a few kilometers from Lake Mégantic and Lake Mckenzie, its outlet flows into the neighboring watershed as far as Grand lac Saint-François, source of the Saint-François River.

== Tourism ==
The "Chemin du Lac-Whitton" provides access to the lake and is located in an environment of nature and forest.
