= Quebec Autoroute 955 =

Highway in Quebec, Canada

Autoroute 955

Route information
- Maintained by Transports Québec
- Length: 14.70 km (9.13 mi)
- Existed: 1975–present

Major junctions
- South end: R-122 in Saint-Albert
- North end: A-20 (TCH) / A-55 in Sainte-Eulalie

Location
- Country: Canada
- Province: Quebec
- Major cities: Saint-Albert, Sainte-Eulalie

Highway system
- Quebec provincial highways; Autoroutes; List; Former
← A-930	→ A-973

Autoroute 955 is a short 14.7-kilometre (9.1 mi) two-lane highway which links Autoroute 20 in Sainte-Eulalie with Saint-Albert.

This short section of Autoroute was destined to become part of a much longer section of freeway, as Autoroute 55 was supposed to follow this route south towards Warwick and Richmond, as opposed to its current configuration through Drummondville; this was never completed, but the short route still remains. The route has a posted speed limit of 100 kilometres per hour (62 mph) despite at-grade four-way stop intersections.

Its northern interchange with Autoroute 20 also connects it to parent route Autoroute 55, which was extended south to A-20 in October 2006.

Prior to 2018, the highway stretched all the way to Rue Principale in Saint-Albert. Since then, the Ministère des Transports du Québec has trimmed the highway 1.2 km, to Route 122, to allow agricultural vehicles to use the last kilometre of the highway.

Hydro-Québec's HVDC Quebec - New England Transmission circuit runs parallel alongside A-955 through most of the road's length.

== Major intersections ==
RCM	Location	km	mi	Exit	Destinations	Notes
Arthabaska	Saint-Albert	−1.20	−0.75	–	Rue Principale – Saint-Albert, Warwick	At-grade intersection
Arthabaska	Saint-Albert	0.00	0.00	–	R-122 (Boulevard Pierre-Roux) – Drummondville, Victoriaville	At-grade intersection
Nicolet-Yamaska	Sainte-Eulalie	13.90– 14.70	8.64– 9.13	15	A-20 (TCH) / A-55 south – Sainte-Eulalie, Québec, Drummondville, Montréal	Signed as exits 15-E (east) and 15-O (west); exit 210 on A-20; exit 145 on A-55
Nicolet-Yamaska	Sainte-Eulalie	13.90– 14.70	8.64– 9.13	–	A-55 north – Bécancour, Trois-Rivières	Continuation beyond A-20
1.000 mi = 1.609 km; 1.000 km = 0.621 mi: Closed/former
