= Quebec Route 214 =

Highway in Quebec, Canada

Route 214

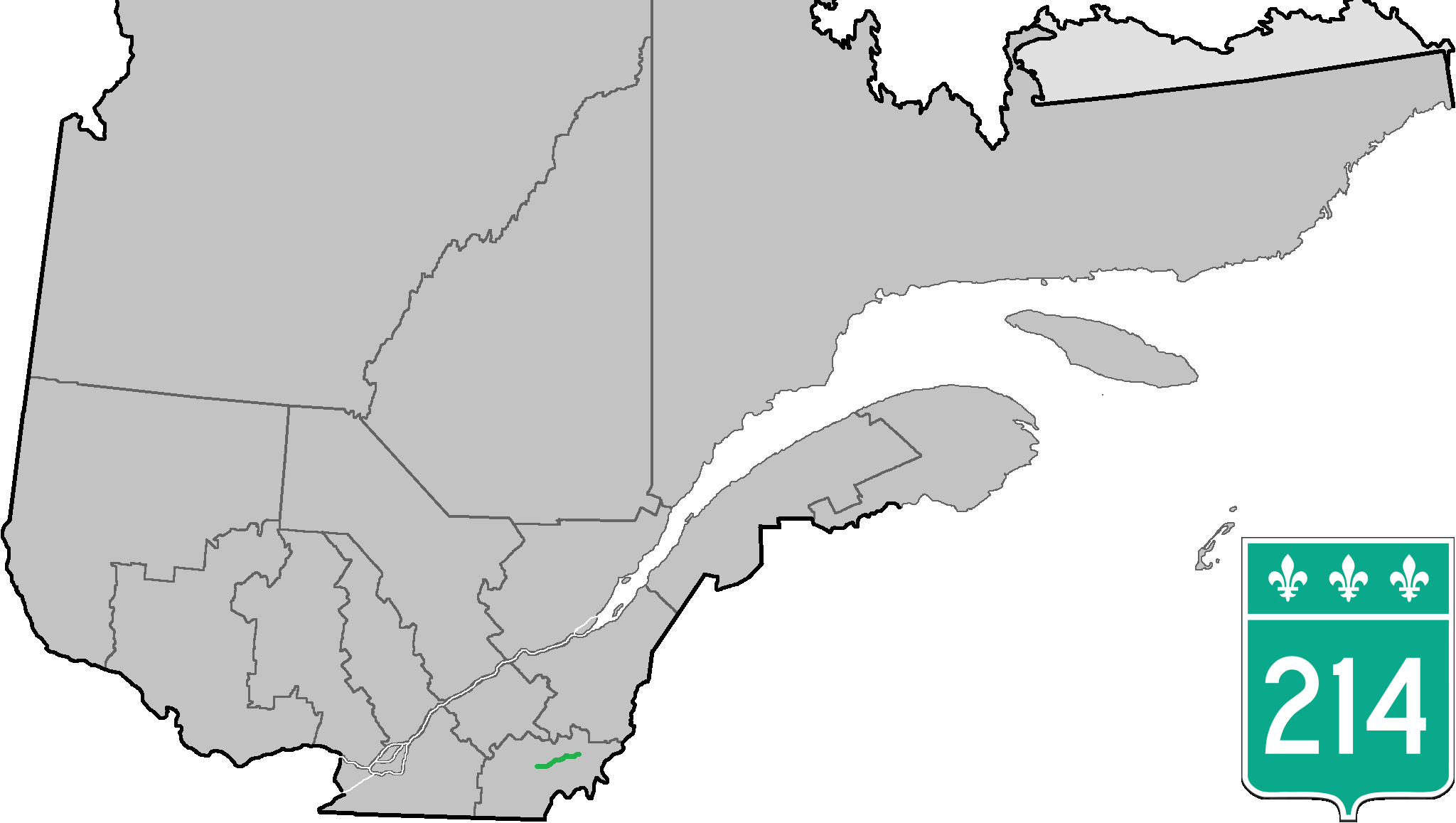

Route information
- Maintained by Transports Québec
- Length: 63.1 km (39.2 mi)

Major junctions
- West end: R-112 in East Angus
- R-253 in East Angus; R-108 / R-255 in Bury; R-257 in Scotstown
- East end: R-161 in Nantes

Location
- Country: Canada
- Province: Quebec

Highway system
- Quebec provincial highways; Autoroutes; List; Former
← R-213	→ R-215

Route 214 is a two-lane east–west highway in Quebec, Canada. Its links Route 112 in East Angus to Route 161 in Nantes via Scotstown, Hampden and Milan.

== Municipalities along Route 214 ==
- East Angus
- Bury
- Lingwick
- Scotstown
- Hampden
- Milan
- Nantes
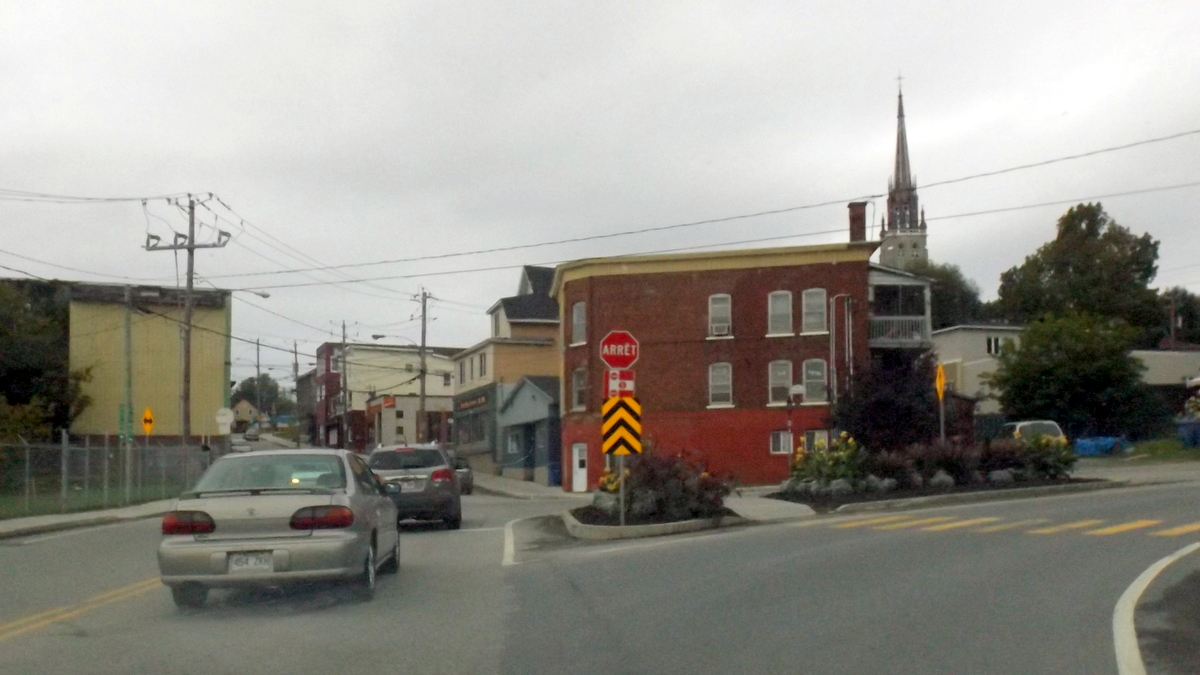
In the town of East Angus, near west end of Route 214.

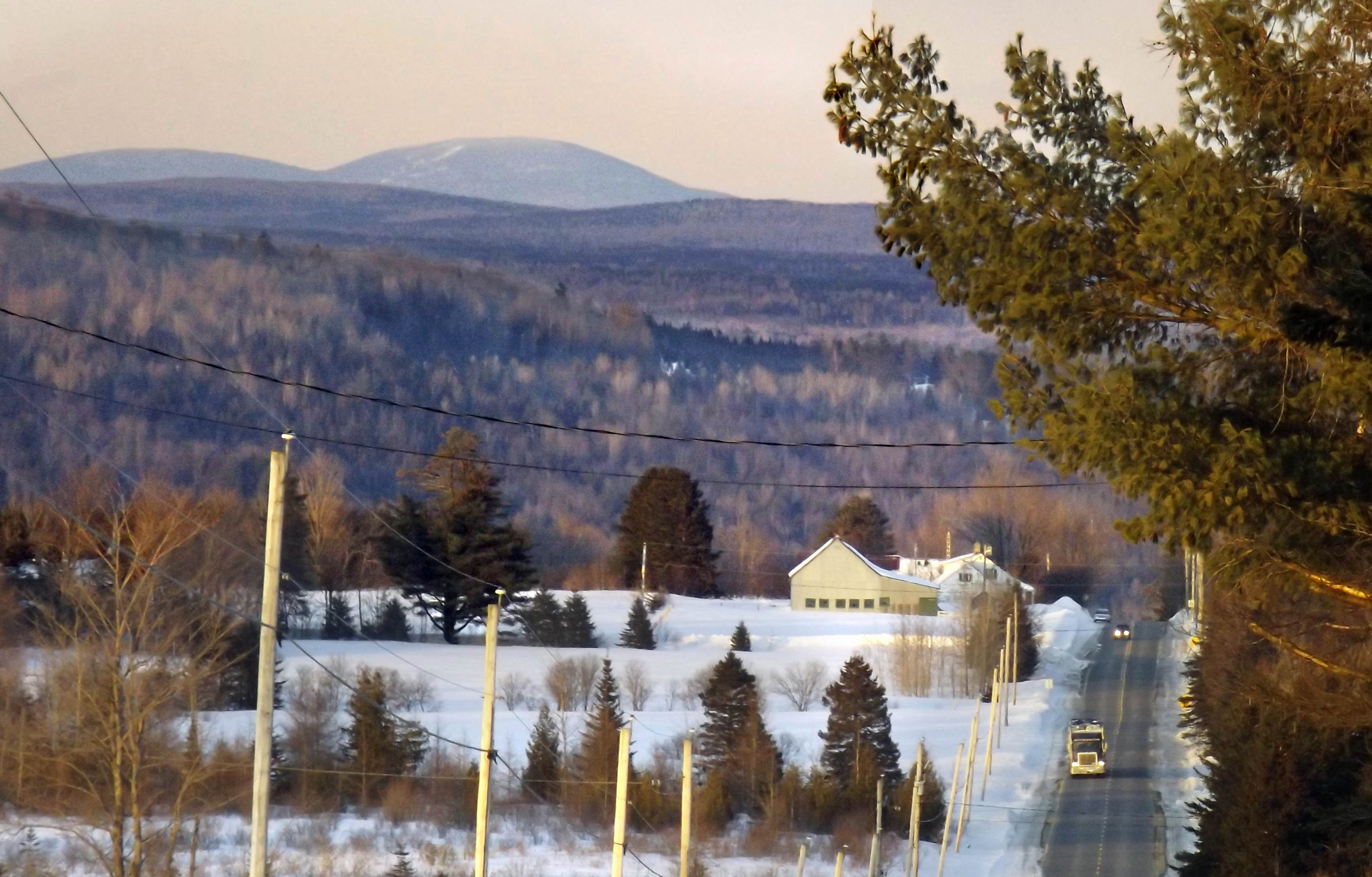
Eastward view from Bury.

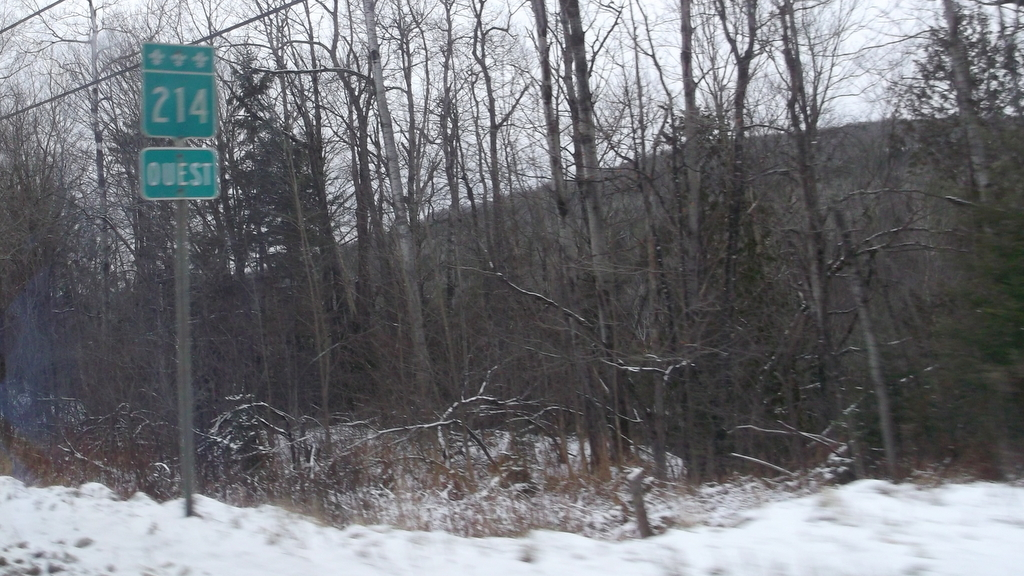
Quebec Route 214 in Scotstown.

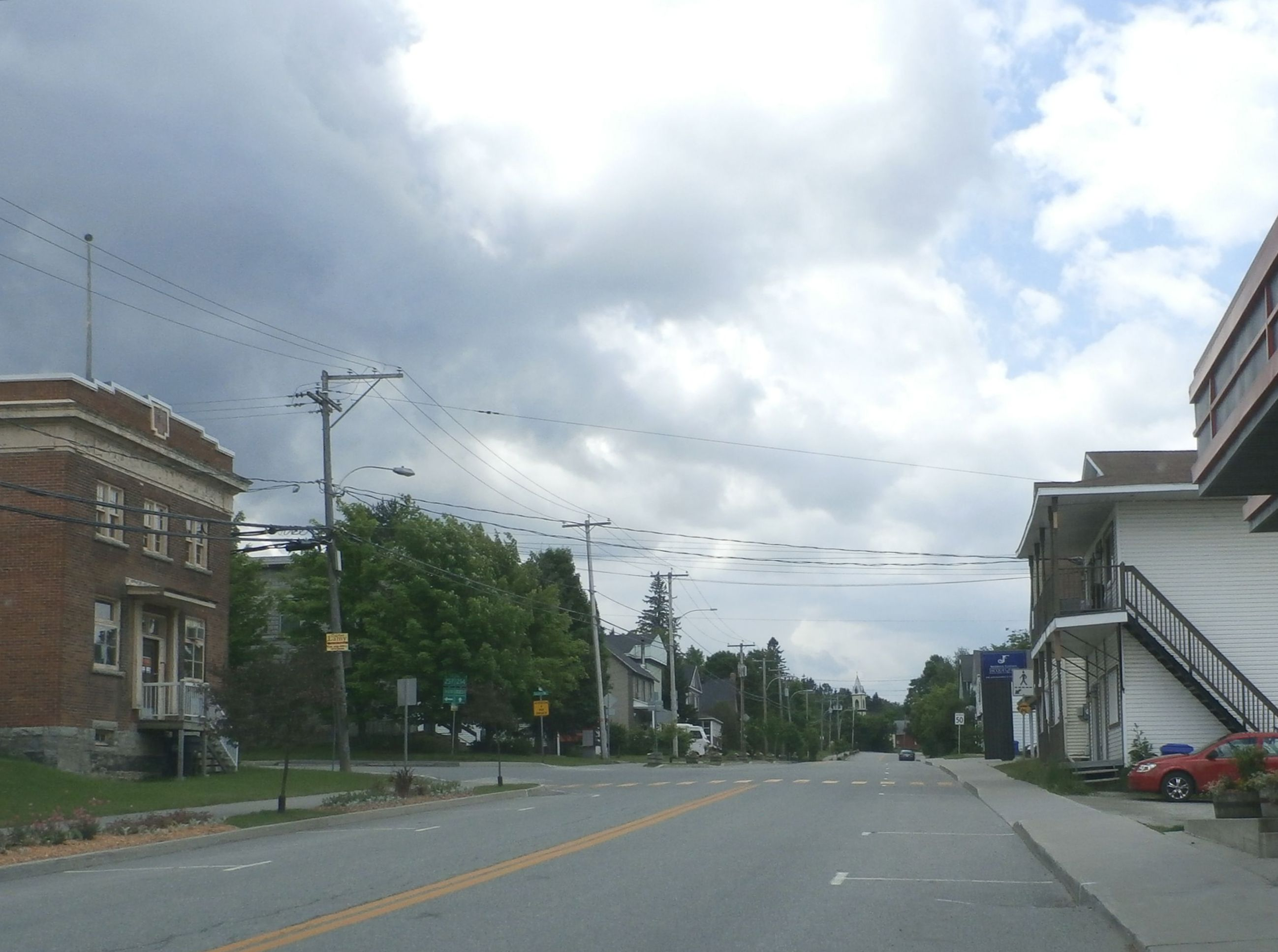
Victoria street in Scotstown.

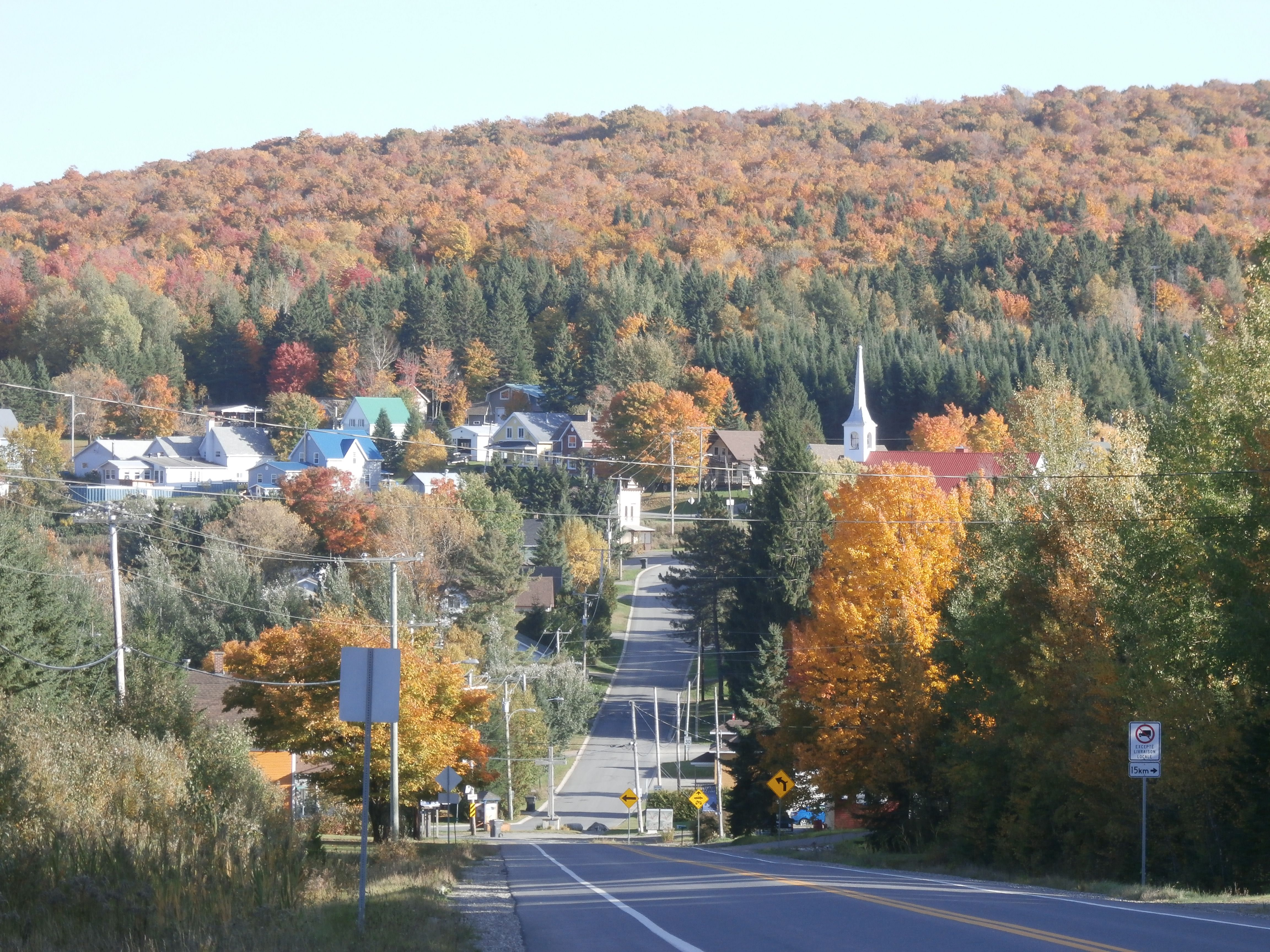
Route 214 entering Milan village.

== Major intersections ==
RCM or ET	Municipality	Km	Junction	Notes
Western terminus of Route 214
Le Haut-Saint-François	East Angus	0.0	R-112	112 WEST: to Ascot Corner; 112 EAST: to Dudswell
Le Haut-Saint-François	East Angus	0.3	R-253 (North end)	253 SOUTH: to Cookshire-Eaton
Le Haut-Saint-François	Bury	12.4; 13.9	R-108 (Overlap 1.5 km)	108 WEST: to Cookshire-Eaton; 108 EAST: to Lingwick
Le Haut-Saint-François	Bury	16.6	R-255 (South end)	255 NORTH: to Dudswell
Le Haut-Saint-François	Scotstown	35.3; 35.7	R-257 (Overlap 0.4 km)	257 SOUTH: to La Patrie; 257 NORTH: to Lingwick
Le Granit	Nantes	63.1	R-161	161 SOUTH: to Lac-Mégantic; 161 NORTH: to Stornoway
Eastern terminus of Route 214

== See also ==
- List of Quebec provincial highways
