= Scotstown, Quebec =

Scotstown
- City
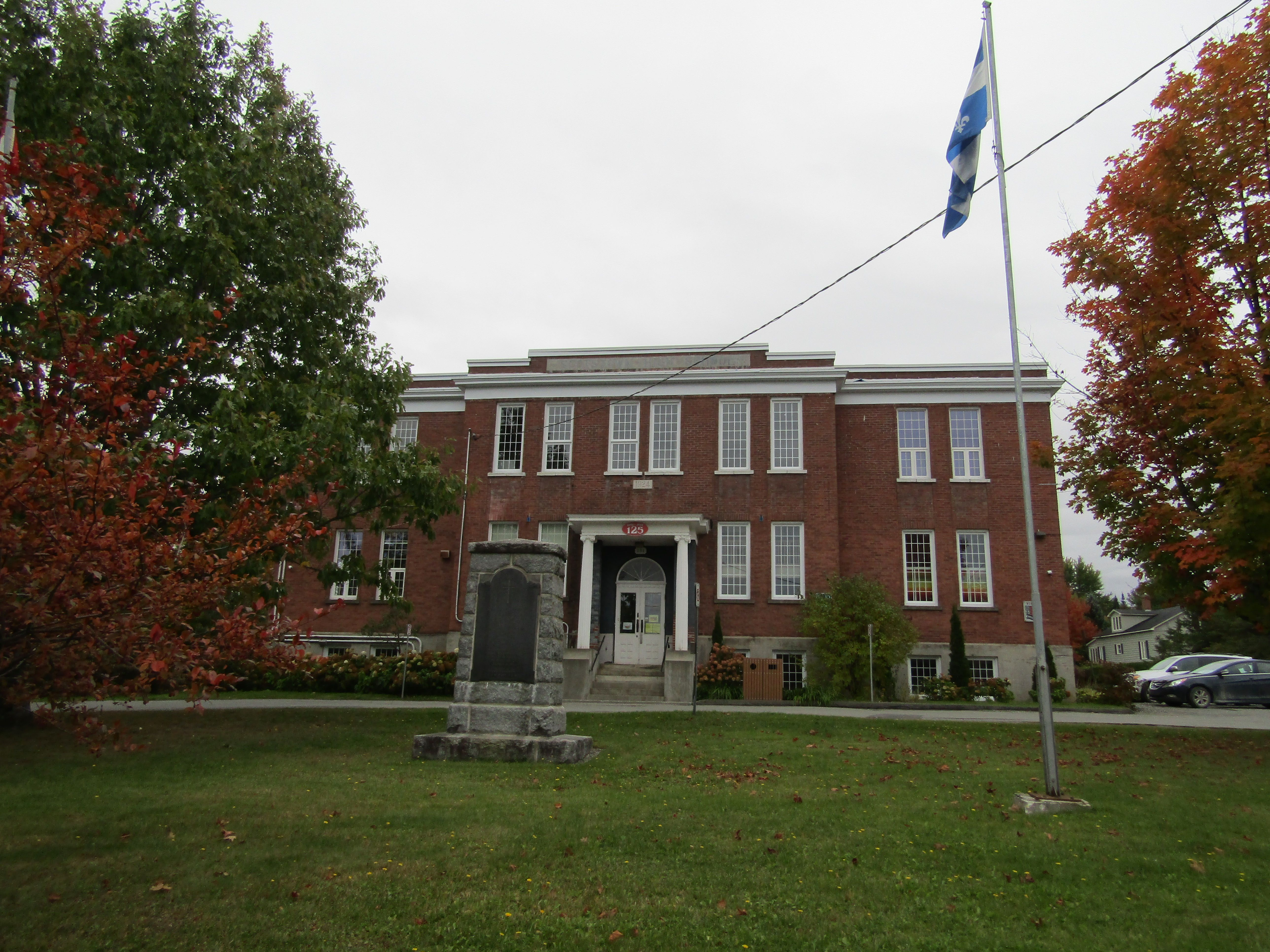
- Motto: Naturellement
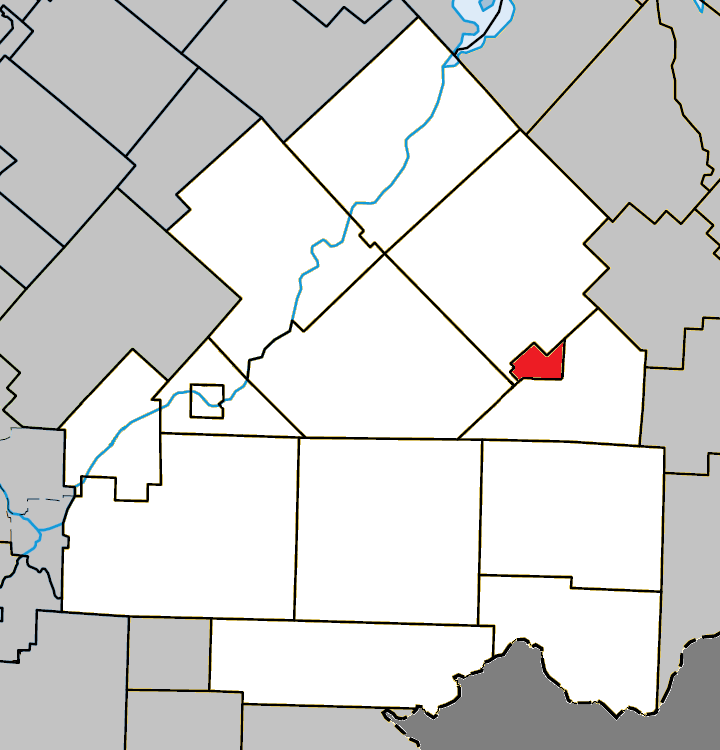
- Location within Le Haut-Saint-François RCM

- Location in southern Quebec
- Coordinates: 45.52296°N 71.28112°W
- Country: Canada
- Province: Quebec
- Region: Estrie
- RCM: Le Haut-Saint-François
- Constituted: June 24, 1892

Government
  - Mayor: Marc-Olivier Désilets
  - Federal riding: Compton—Stanstead
  - Prov. riding: Mégantic

Area
  - Total: 12.00 km^{2} (4.63 sq mi)
  - Land: 11.44 km^{2} (4.42 sq mi)

Population (2021)
  - Total: 459
  - Density: 40.1/km^{2} (104/sq mi)
  - Pop 2016-2021: ▼2.8%
  - Dwellings: 272
- Time zone: UTC−5 (EST)
  - Summer (DST): UTC−4 (EDT)
- Postal code(s): J0B 3B0
- Area code: 819
- Highways: R-214; R-257
- Website: www.scotstown-hsf.com

Scotstown is a city in Le Haut-Saint-François Regional County Municipality in the Estrie region of Quebec, Canada. Its population in the Canada 2021 Census was 459.

The town is renowned for its multiple legends carried by its first settlers, who emigrated from Scotland.

== Demographics ==
In the 2021 Census of Population conducted by Statistics Canada, Scotstown had a population of 459 living in 230 of its 272 total private dwellings, a change of −2.8% from its 2016 population of 472. With a land area of 11.44 km^{2} (4.42 sq mi), it had a population density of 40.1/km^{2} (103.9/sq mi) in 2021.

Canada census – Scotstown community profile

| | 2021 | 2016 | 2011 |
| Population | 459 (-2.8% from 2016) | 472 (-13.7% from 2011) | 547 (-7.0% from 2006) |
| Land area | 11.44 km^{2} (4.42 sq mi) | 11.46 km^{2} (4.42 sq mi) | 11.50 km^{2} (4.44 sq mi) |
| Population density | 40.1/km^{2} (104/sq mi) | 41.2/km^{2} (107/sq mi) | 47.6/km^{2} (123/sq mi) |
| Median age | 56.0 (M: 54.4, F: 57.2) | 54.1 (M: 53.2, F: 54.6) | 49.6 (M: 47.9, F: 51.2) |
| Private dwellings | 272 (total) | 279 (total) | 276 (total) |
| Median household income | $50,400 | $38,528 | $33,162 |

References: 2021 2016 2011

== Notable people ==
- Robert James Cromie, born in Scotstown in 1887, was the publisher of the Vancouver Sun from 1917 until his death in 1936.

== See also ==
- List of anglophone communities in Quebec
