= Stornoway, Quebec =

Stornoway
- Municipality
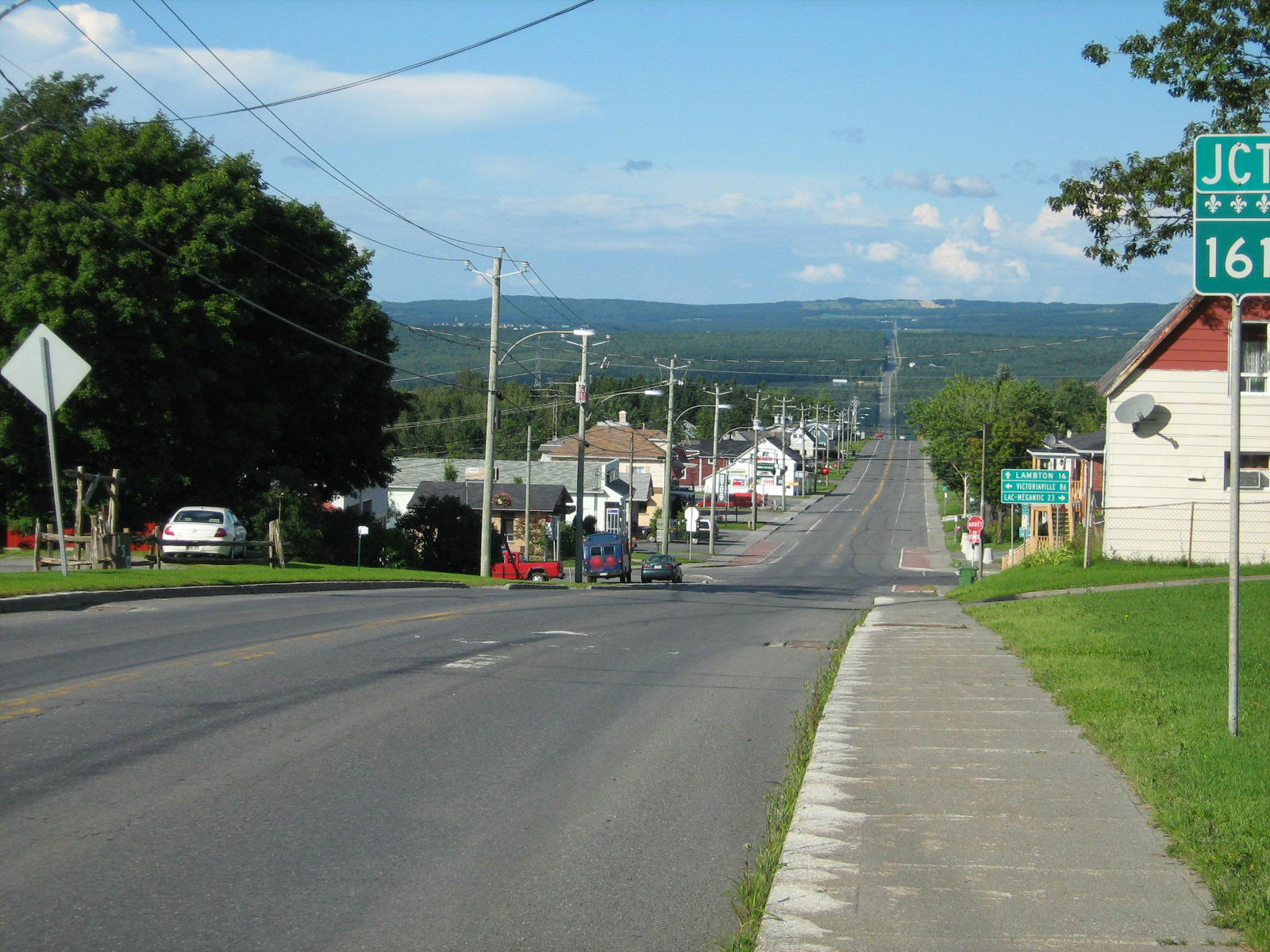
- Village of Stornoway

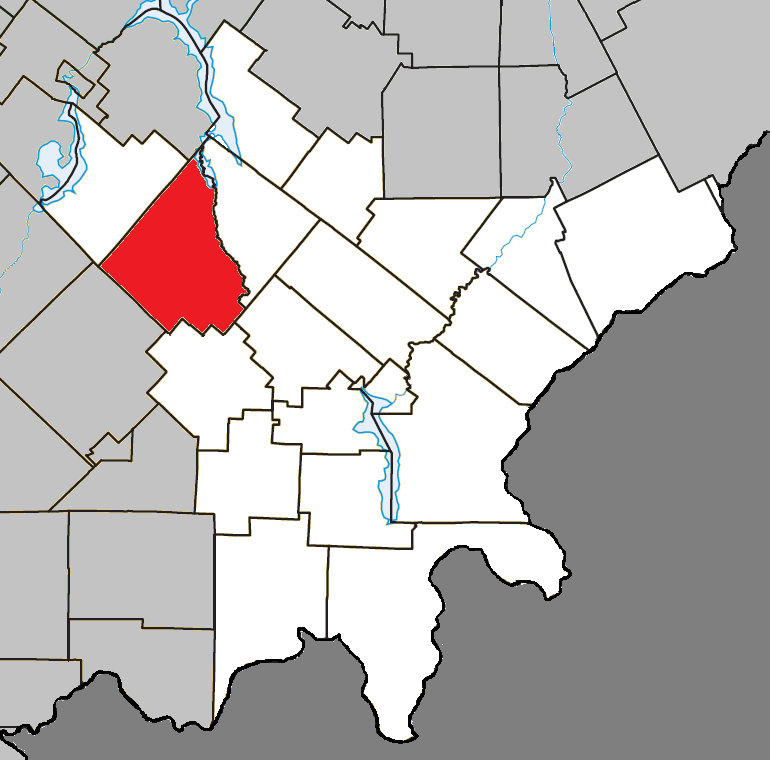
- Location within Le Granit RCM

- Location in southern Quebec
- Coordinates: 45°43′N 71°10′W
- Country: Canada
- Province: Quebec
- Region: Estrie
- RCM: Le Granit
- Constituted: January 1, 1858

Government
  - Mayor: Martine Brouard
  - Federal riding: Mégantic—L'Érable—Lotbinière
  - Prov. riding: Mégantic

Area
  - Total: 184.60 km^{2} (71.27 sq mi)
  - Land: 180.15 km^{2} (69.56 sq mi)

Population (2021)
  - Total: 535
  - Density: 3/km^{2} (7.8/sq mi)
  - Pop 2016-2021: ▲0.9%
  - Dwellings: 272
- Time zone: UTC−5 (EST)
  - Summer (DST): UTC−4 (EDT)
- Postal code(s): G0Y 1N0
- Area code: 819
- Highways: R-108; R-161
- Website: www.munstornoway.qc.ca

Stornoway (French: Stornoway; Scottish Gaelic: Steòrnabhagh) is a small village of 500 people. It is a municipality in Quebec, in the regional county municipality of Le Granit in the administrative region of Estrie. It is named after Stornoway, a burgh on the Isle of Lewis, in the Outer Hebrides of Scotland by Colin Noble in 1852, replacing Bruceville.

It is at the intersection of two provincial highways, Route 108 and Route 161. The town is listed as a Village rélais.

== History ==
Stornoway was originally called Winslow-Sud. The municipality was the southern part of the former municipality of Winslow, which was divided in two by the Felton River. The other half of the former municipality is now called Saint-Romain. The split happened in 1858. The area was originally settled by Scots, who named the sector Stornoway after Stornoway, the largest town of Isle of Lewis, a region on the island of Lewis and Harris, the largest of Scotland’s Outer Hebrides.

The first French-Canadian family to settle in the area was the Legendre family, whose history is the subject of Jean O’Neil’s book *L’âge du bois – Stornoway*. In 1948, the southern part of the Winslow-Sud was used for the creation of Milan. In 1973, the name Winslow-Sud was changed to Stornoway. On 1 October 2009, the municipality was designated a ‘village-relais’ by Transports Québec. This designation means that the municipality must provide services comparable to those of larger towns (shops open for longer hours, toilet facilities available 24 hours a day, places to stay, etc.).

== Geography ==
The Felton River estuary, where the Blanche and Noire rivers meet, is situated to the south-east of the municipality. The Legendre River joins the Felton River to the east of the municipality.

== Demographics ==
Historical population

| Year | Pop. | ±% |
|---|---|---|
| 1861 | 800 | — |
| 1871 | 702 | −12.3% |
| 1881 | 944 | +34.5% |
| 1891 | 705 | −25.3% |
| 1901 | 684 | −3.0% |
| 1911 | 863 | +26.2% |
| 1921 | 909 | +5.3% |
| 1931 | 913 | +0.4% |
| 1941 | 1,009 | +10.5% |
| 1951 | 920 | −8.8% |
| 1956 | 887 | −3.6% |
| 1961 | 826 | −6.9% |

| Year | Pop. | ±% |
|---|---|---|
| 1966 | 744 | −9.9% |
| 1971 | 671 | −9.8% |
| 1976 | 588 | −12.4% |
| 1981 | 571 | −2.9% |
| 1986 | 543 | −4.9% |
| 1991 | 546 | +0.6% |
| 1996 | 564 | +3.3% |
| 2001 | 606 | +7.4% |
| 2006 | 584 | −3.6% |
| 2011 | 559 | −4.3% |
| 2016 | 530 | −5.2% |
| 2021 | 535 | +0.9% |

Source: StatsCan
