= Milan, Quebec =

Milan
- Municipality
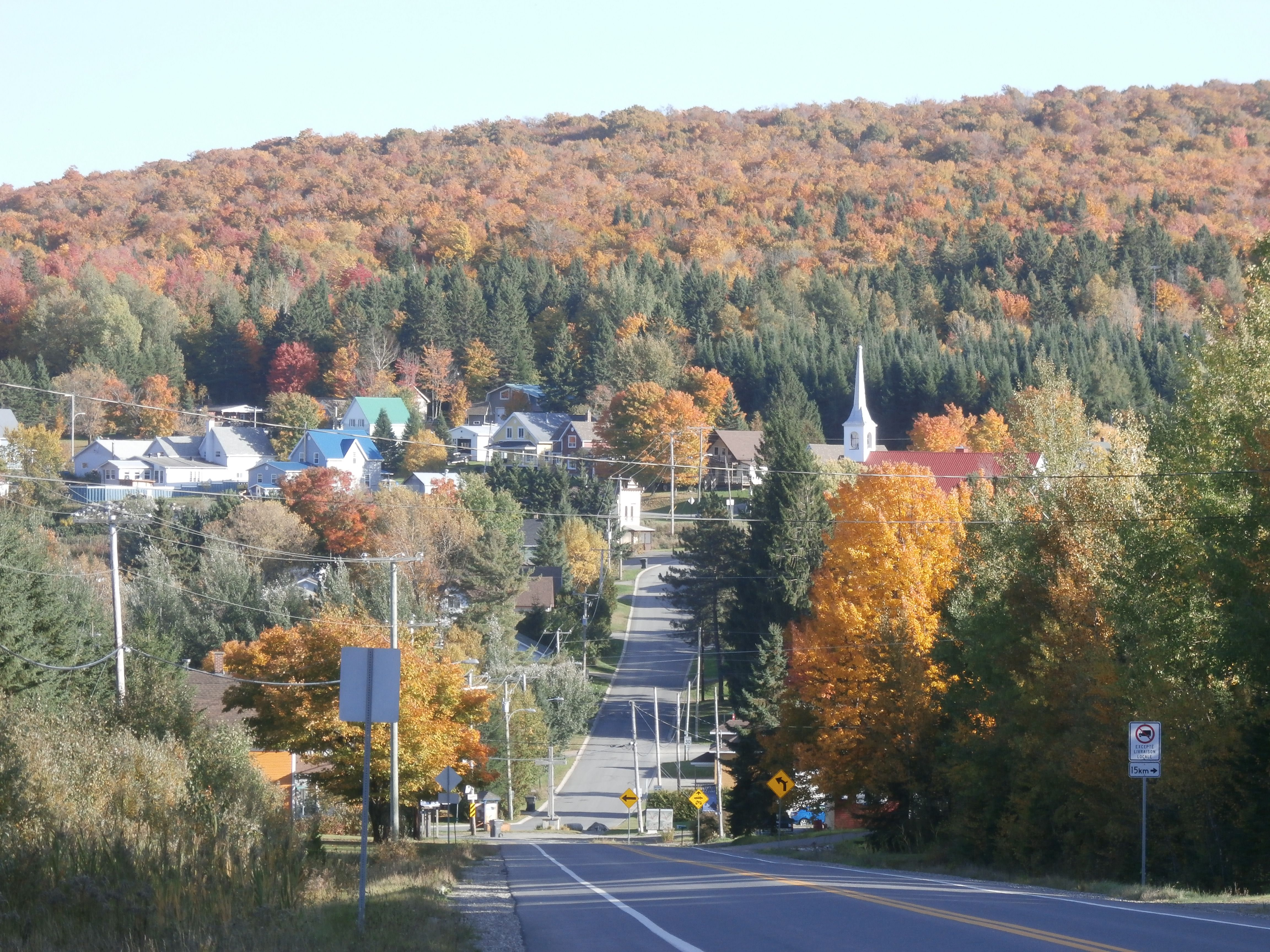

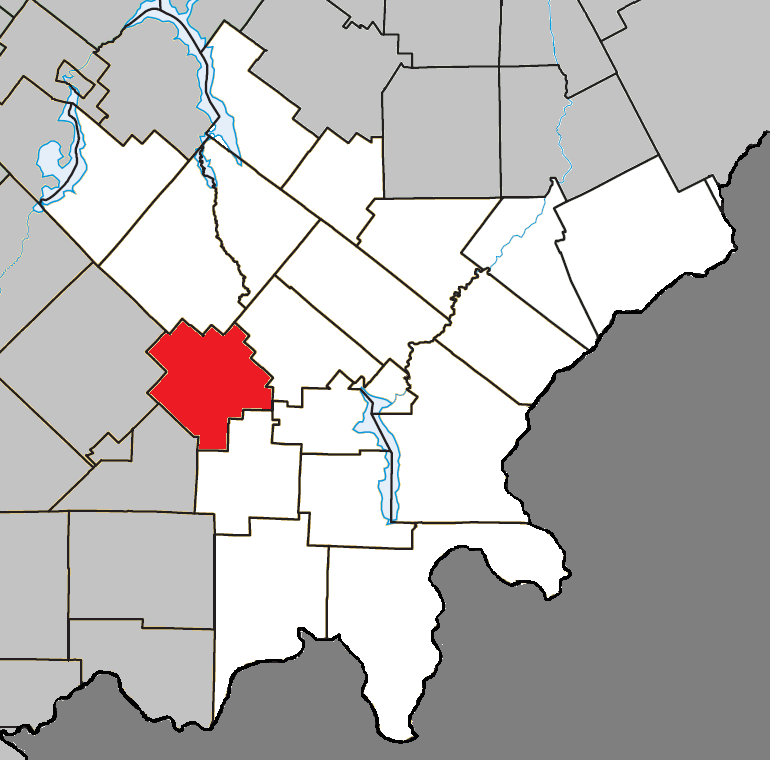
- Location within Le Granit RCM

- Location in southern Quebec
- Coordinates: 45°36′N 71°08′W
- Country: Canada
- Province: Quebec
- Region: Estrie
- RCM: Le Granit
- Constituted: 1 June 1948
- Named for: Milan, Italy

Government
  - Mayor: Jacques Bergeron
  - Federal riding: Mégantic—L'Érable—Lotbinière
  - Prov. riding: Mégantic

Area
  - Total: 130.80 km^{2} (50.50 sq mi)
  - Land: 129.44 km^{2} (49.98 sq mi)

Population (2021)
  - Total: 318
  - Density: 2.5/km^{2} (6.5/sq mi)
  - Pop 2016–2021: ▲6.4%
  - Dwellings: 212
- Time zone: UTC−5 (EST)
  - Summer (DST): UTC−4 (EDT)
- Postal code(s): G0Y 1E0
- Area code: 819
- Highways: R-214
- Website: www.munmilan.qc.ca

Milan is a municipality of about 300 people in Le Granit Regional County Municipality in the Estrie region in Quebec, Canada.

The community was established 1877 by Scottish immigrants from Lewis, and originally known as Marsden. Due to confusion with the township of Marston, the community's name was changed to Milan some years later.

== Geography ==
=== Climate ===
Climate data for Milan
Month	Jan	Feb	Mar	Apr	May	Jun	Jul	Aug	Sep	Oct	Nov	Dec	Year
Record high °C (°F)	16 (61)	16 (61)	21.5 (70.7)	28 (82)	30 (86)	31.5 (88.7)	33.3 (91.9)	32.2 (90.0)	30 (86)	26.7 (80.1)	21.7 (71.1)	17.2 (63.0)	33.3 (91.9)
Mean daily maximum °C (°F)	−6.6 (20.1)	−5.1 (22.8)	0.7 (33.3)	7.5 (45.5)	16.1 (61.0)	20.7 (69.3)	22.8 (73.0)	21.5 (70.7)	16.5 (61.7)	10 (50)	2.7 (36.9)	−3.7 (25.3)	8.6 (47.5)
Daily mean °C (°F)	−11.9 (10.6)	−10.6 (12.9)	−4.8 (23.4)	2.4 (36.3)	10 (50)	14.8 (58.6)	17.3 (63.1)	16.1 (61.0)	11.3 (52.3)	5.3 (41.5)	−1.3 (29.7)	−8.5 (16.7)	3.3 (37.9)
Mean daily minimum °C (°F)	−17.2 (1.0)	−16 (3)	−10.2 (13.6)	−2.8 (27.0)	3.9 (39.0)	9 (48)	11.7 (53.1)	10.7 (51.3)	6 (43)	0.6 (33.1)	−5.4 (22.3)	−13.3 (8.1)	−1.9 (28.6)
Record low °C (°F)	−38.3 (−36.9)	−39 (−38)	−34.5 (−30.1)	−22.8 (−9.0)	−12.2 (10.0)	−2.2 (28.0)	0 (32)	−1.1 (30.0)	−8.5 (16.7)	−12.8 (9.0)	−26 (−15)	−35 (−31)	−39 (−38)
Average precipitation mm (inches)	105.8 (4.17)	89.2 (3.51)	101.1 (3.98)	85.8 (3.38)	105.7 (4.16)	127.5 (5.02)	125.9 (4.96)	137.9 (5.43)	115.8 (4.56)	104.7 (4.12)	109.8 (4.32)	113.1 (4.45)	1,322.4 (52.06)
Source: Environment Canada
