= Sainte-Cécile-de-Whitton =

- Municipality
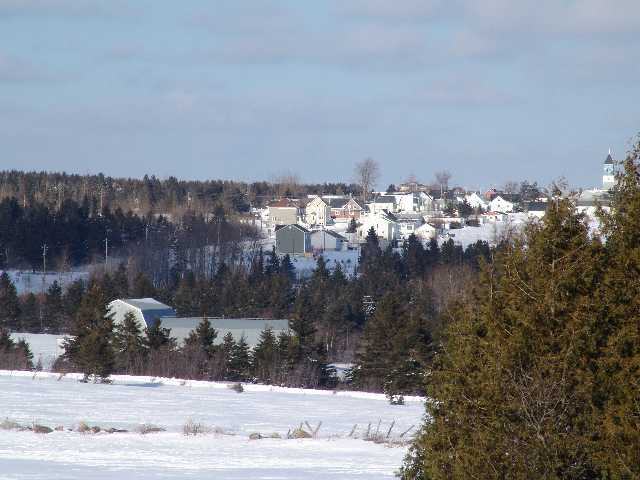

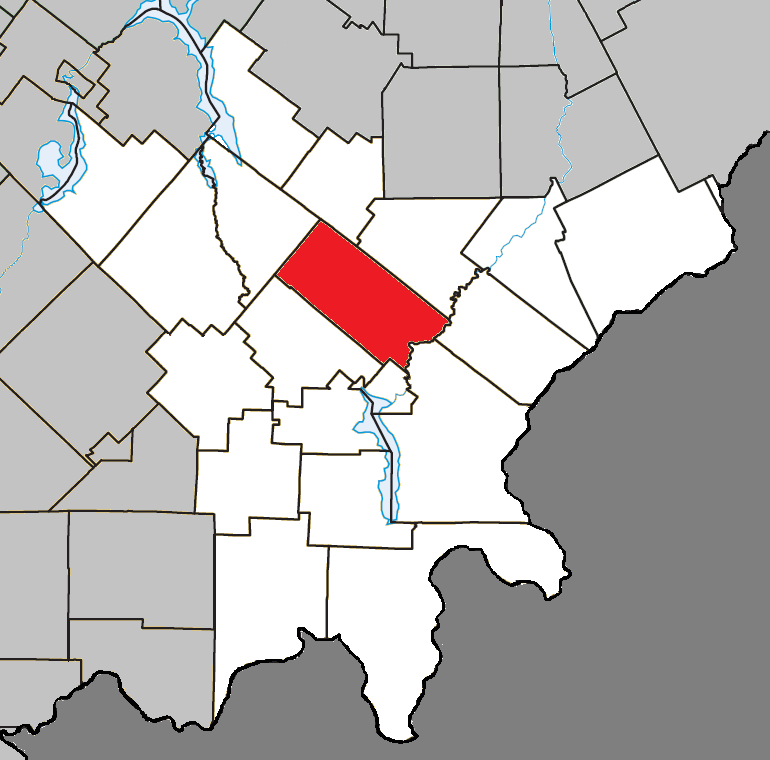
- Location within Le Granit RCM.

- Location in southern Quebec.
- Coordinates: 45°40′N 70°56′W
- Country: Canada
- Province: Quebec
- Region: Estrie
- RCM: Le Granit
- Constituted: September 19, 1889

Government
  - Mayor: Pierre Dumas
  - Federal riding: Mégantic—L'Érable—Lotbinière
  - Prov. riding: Mégantic

Area
  - Total: 149.40 km^{2} (57.68 sq mi)
  - Land: 146.00 km^{2} (56.37 sq mi)

Population (2011)
  - Total: 892
  - Density: 6.1/km^{2} (16/sq mi)
  - Pop 2006–2011: ▼0.8%
  - Dwellings: 438
- Time zone: UTC−5 (EST)
  - Summer (DST): UTC−4 (EDT)
- Postal code(s): G0Y 1J0
- Area code: 819
- Highways: R-263
- Website: www.stececile dewhitton.qc.ca

Sainte-Cécile-de-Whitton is a municipality in Quebec, in the regional county municipality of Le Granit in the administrative region of Estrie. It is named after Saint Cecilia, the patron saint of musicians and Church music.
