= Nantes, Quebec =

Nantes
- Municipality
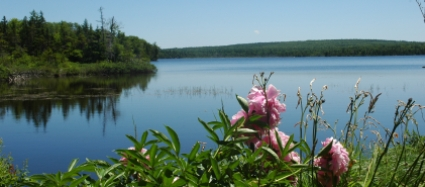
- Lake near Nantes

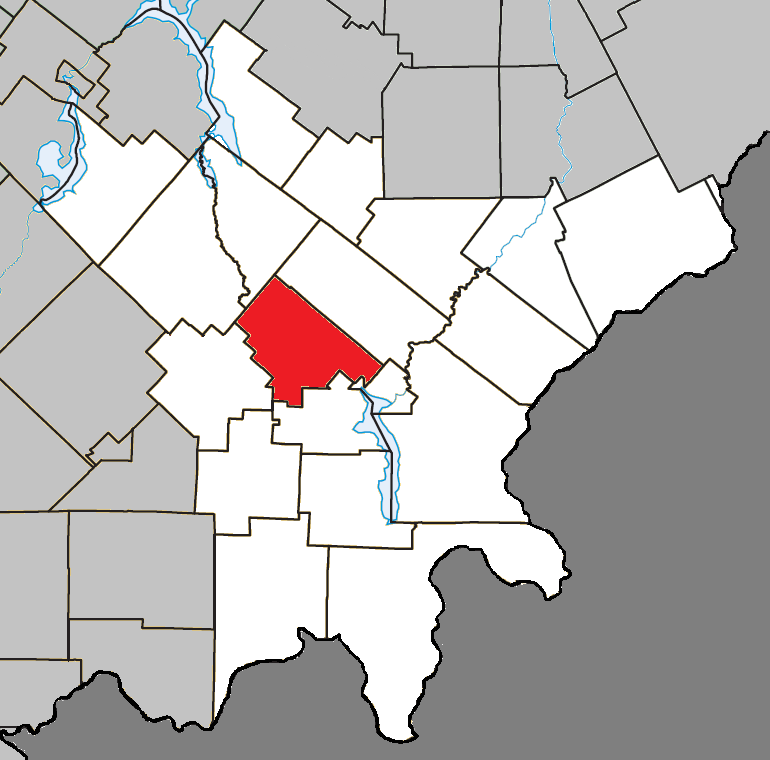
- Location within Le Granit RCM.

- Location in southern Quebec.
- Coordinates: 45°38′N 71°02′W
- Country: Canada
- Province: Quebec
- Region: Estrie
- RCM: Le Granit
- Constituted: January 1, 1874

Government
  - Mayor: Daniel Gendron
  - Federal riding: Mégantic—L'Érable—Lotbinière
  - Prov. riding: Mégantic

Area
  - Total: 120.50 km^{2} (46.53 sq mi)
  - Land: 119.16 km^{2} (46.01 sq mi)

Population (2021)
  - Total: 1,388
  - Density: 11.6/km^{2} (30/sq mi)
  - Pop 2016-2021: ▲0.8%
  - Dwellings: 668
- Time zone: UTC−5 (EST)
  - Summer (DST): UTC−4 (EDT)
- Postal code(s): G0Y 1G0
- Area code: 819
- Highways: R-161; R-214; R-263
- Website: www.munantes.qc.ca

Nantes (French pronunciation: [nɑ̃t]) is a municipality in Le Granit Regional County Municipality in the Estrie region of Quebec, Canada. It is situated between Stornoway and Lac-Mégantic, where the Canadian Pacific Railway used to cross. Its population in the Canada 2021 Census was 1,388.

== History ==
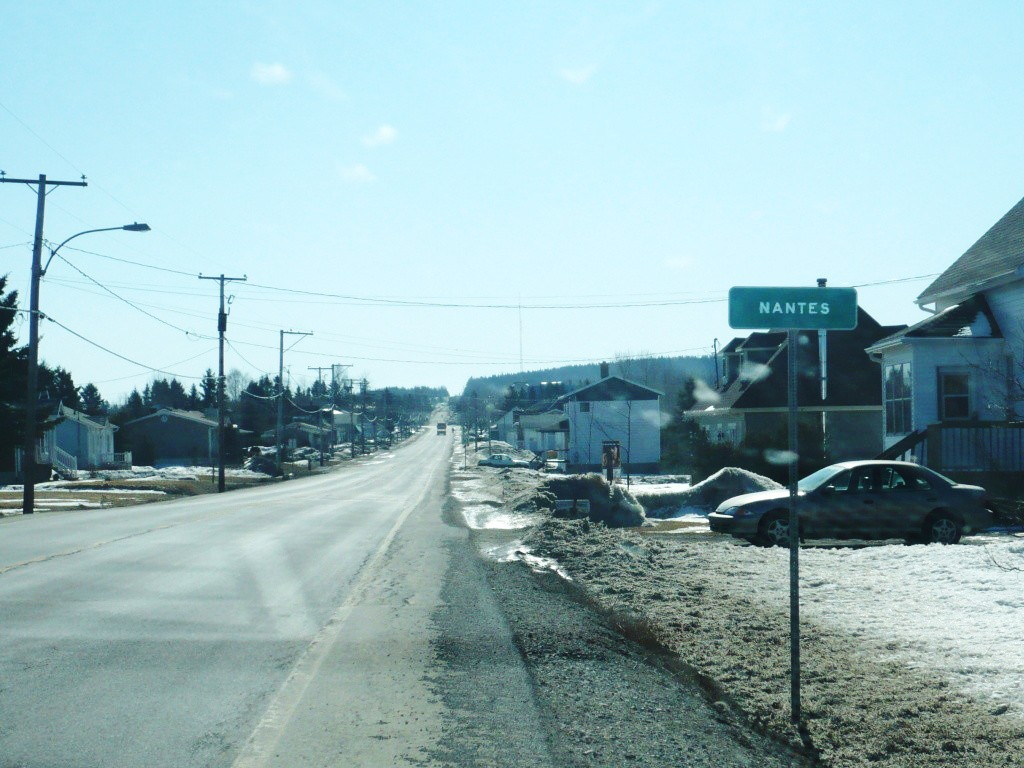
Entrance to Nantes

Nantes used to be called Spring Hill. In 1856, Scottish settlers established their camps. It was called Drum-A-Vack in Gaelic. French-Canadian families took over the camps in 1905. A train station and a postal office were added to the community in 1879 and in 1898, two sawmills, two telegraph offices, and two general stores were added as well.

Nantes has the distinction of having the last electro-mechanical telephone exchange in the public network of North America, finally converting to digital in 2002.

On July 6, 2013, a Montreal, Maine and Atlantic Railway train engine was left unmanned and parked on the line. The engine caught fire and was extinguished by the Nantes Fire Department. In the process of extinguishing the fire, the fire department turned off the engine. As the engine had been turned off, the brake system began to lose pressure, eventually dropping to the point the brakes could no longer hold the train in place. The train rolled away from Nantes, towards Lac-Mégantic, Quebec, and derailed there, causing an explosion that destroyed around half of the downtown area and killed forty-seven people.
