= Saint-Romain, Quebec =

Saint-Romain
- Municipality
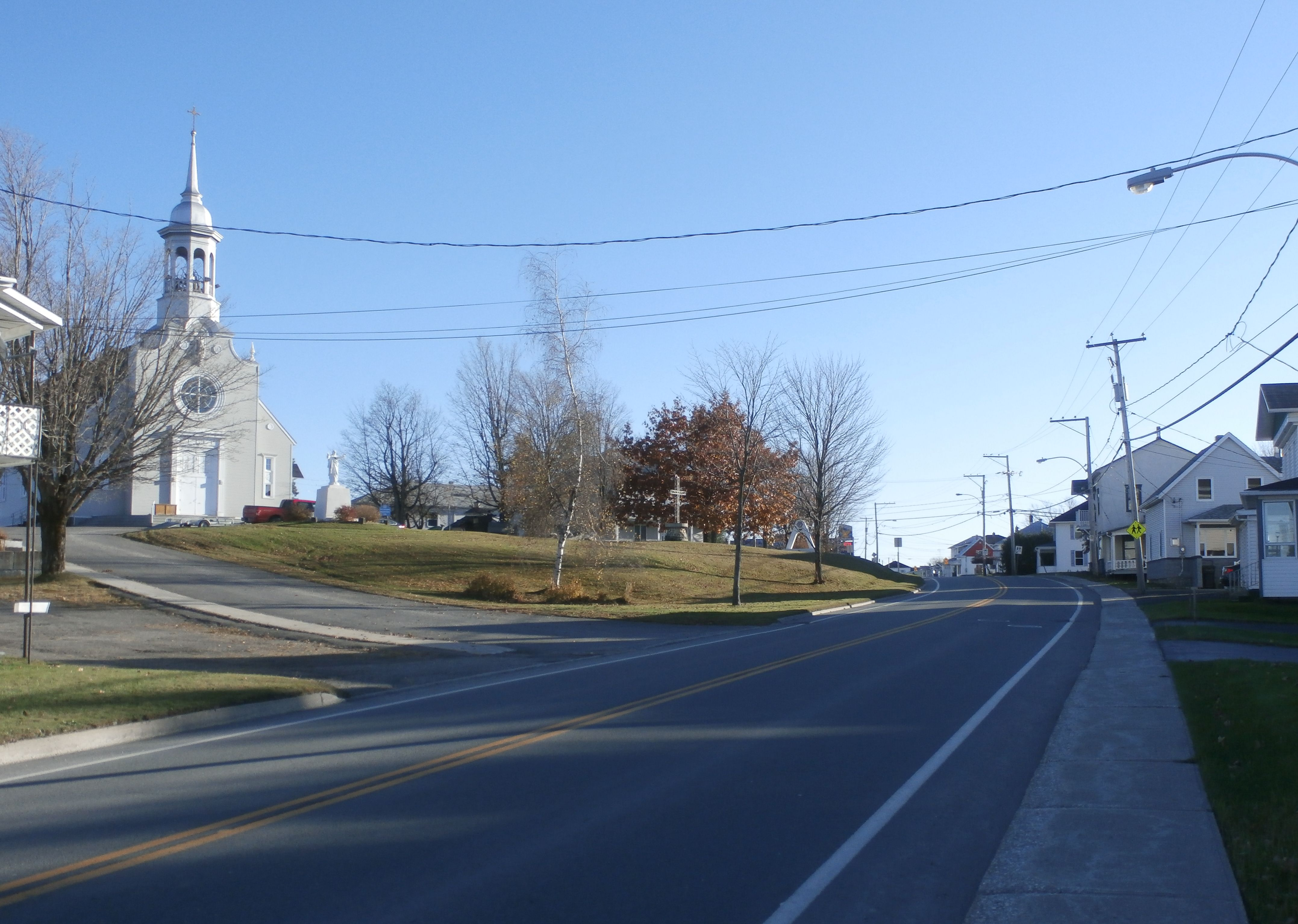

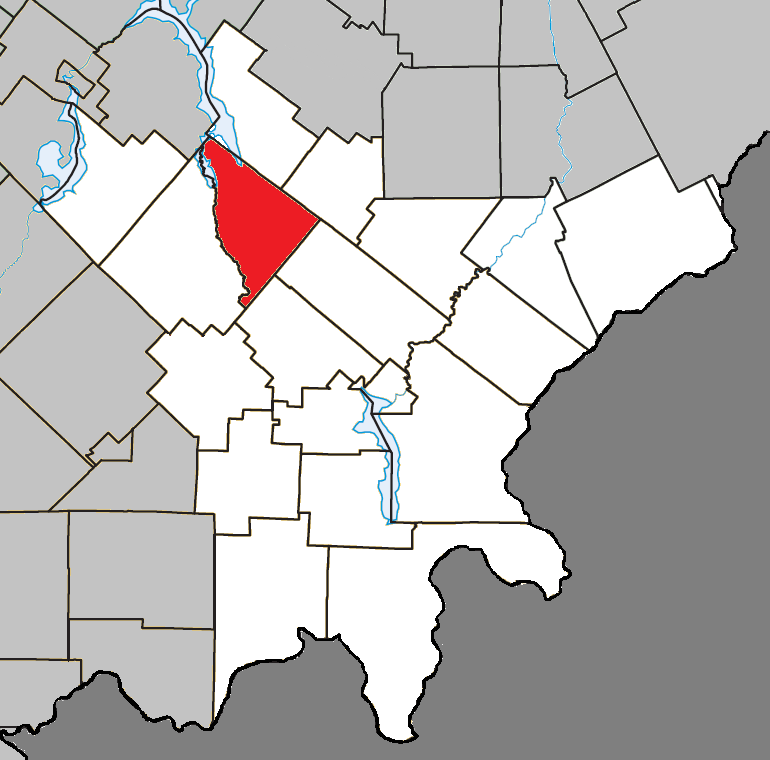
- Location within Le Granit RCM

- Location in southern Quebec
- Coordinates: 45°47′N 71°06′W
- Country: Canada
- Province: Quebec
- Region: Estrie
- RCM: Le Granit
- Constituted: January 1, 1858

Government
  - Mayor: Amélie Isabel
  - Federal riding: Mégantic—L'Érable—Lotbinière
  - Prov. riding: Mégantic

Area
  - Total: 116.00 km^{2} (44.79 sq mi)
  - Land: 112.12 km^{2} (43.29 sq mi)

Population (2021)
  - Total: 711
  - Density: 6.3/km^{2} (16/sq mi)
  - Pop 2016-2021: ▲2.9%
  - Dwellings: 425
- Time zone: UTC−5 (EST)
  - Summer (DST): UTC−4 (EDT)
- Postal code(s): G0Y 1L0
- Area codes: 418 and 581
- Highways: R-108; R-263
- Website: www.st-romain.ca

Saint-Romain (French pronunciation: [sɛ̃ ʁɔmɛ̃]) is a municipality in Quebec, Canada, in the regional county municipality of Le Granit in the administrative region of Estrie. The municipality is named after Pope Romanus, who was pope from August to November 897. Population is 711 as of the Canada 2021 Census.

== History ==
After Lambton, it is the oldest village in the Estrie region. From 1844 onwards, people from the Beauce region and settlers from Saint-Anselme began to settle there and, in 1855, a municipality named Winslow was founded. The current municipality was created three years later, in 1858 when Winslow was split in two distinct municipalities: Winslow-Sud and Winslow-Nord. In 1962, Winslow-Nord changed its name to become Saint-Romain.
