= Le Granit Regional County Municipality =

Le Granit
- Regional county municipality
- Coordinates: 45°35′N 70°53′W
- Country: Canada
- Province: Quebec
- Region: Estrie
- Effective: May 26, 1982
- County seat: Lac-Mégantic

Government
  - Type: Prefecture
  - Prefect: Monique Pherivong Lenoir

Area
  - Total: 2,831.80 km^{2} (1,093.36 sq mi)
  - Land: 2,735.21 km^{2} (1,056.07 sq mi)

Population (2016)
  - Total: 21,462
  - Density: 7.8/km^{2} (20/sq mi)
  - Change 2011-2016: ▼3.4%
  - Dwellings: 12,478
- Time zone: UTC−5 (EST)
  - Summer (DST): UTC−4 (EDT)
- Area code: 819
- Website: www.mrcgranit.qc.ca

Le Granit (French pronunciation: [lə ɡʁanit], lit. 'The Granite') is a regional county municipality in the Estrie region of eastern Quebec, Canada. Located directly south of Quebec City, it borders the region of Chaudière-Appalaches, as well as the US states of New Hampshire and Maine. It is named for its abundance of granite. Created in 1982, Le Granit's seat is Lac-Mégantic.

== Subdivisions ==
There are 19 subdivisions within the RCM:

Cities & Towns (1)

- Lac-Mégantic

Municipalities (15)

- Audet
- Frontenac
- Lac-Drolet
- Lambton
- Milan
- Nantes
- Notre-Dame-des-Bois
- Piopolis
- Saint-Ludger
- Saint-Robert-Bellarmin
- Saint-Romain
- Saint-Sébastien
- Sainte-Cécile-de-Whitton
- Stornoway
- Val-Racine

Parishes (1)

- Saint-Augustin-de-Woburn

Townships (2)

- Marston
- Stratford

== Demographics ==
=== Population ===
Population trend:

Census	Population	Change (%)
2016	21,462	▼3.4%
2011 revised	22,210	▼0.2%
2011	22,259	▼0.4%
2006	22,342	▲2.3%
2001	21,830	▲2.6%
1996	21,287	▲1.4%
1991	20,993	N/A

=== Language ===
Mother tongue (2016)

Language	Population	Pct (%)
French only	20,720	97.7%
English only	245	1.2%
English and French	85	0.4%
Other languages	155	0.7%

== Transportation ==
=== Access routes ===
Highways and numbered routes that run through the municipality, including external routes that start or finish at the county border:

- Autoroutes
  - None
- Principal highways
  - R-108
  - R-161
- Secondary highways
  - R-204
  - R-212
  - R-214
  - R-263
- External routes
  - SR 27

== See also ==
- List of regional county municipalities and equivalent territories in Quebec
