= Frontenac (Quebec provincial electoral district, 1972–2011) =

Former provincial electoral district in Quebec, Canada

Quebec electoral district

Defunct provincial electoral district
- Legislature: National Assembly of Quebec
- District created: 1972
- District abolished: 2011
- First contested: 1973
- Last contested: 2008

Demographics
- Electors (2008): 33,242
- Area (km²): 1,750.21
- Census division: Les Appalaches (part)
- Census subdivision(s): Adstock, Disraeli (city), Disraeli (parish), East Broughton, Irlande, Kinnear's Mills, Sacré-Coeur-de-Jésus, Saint-Adrien-d'Irlande, Saint-Jacques-de-Leeds, Saint-Jacques-le-Majeur-de-Wolfestown, Saint-Jean-de-Brébeuf, Saint-Joseph-de-Coleraine, Saint-Julien, Saint-Pierre-de-Broughton, Sainte-Praxède, Thetford Mines

Frontenac (French pronunciation: [fʁɔ̃tnak]) is a former provincial electoral district in the Chaudière-Appalaches region of Quebec, Canada, which elected a member to the National Assembly of Quebec. As of its final election, it included the city of Thetford Mines and the municipality of Disraeli.

It is not to be confused with the pre-1973 Frontenac electoral district located in the Estrie region. Sources differ on whether the pre-1973 and post-1973 Frontenac electoral districts should be considered different or one and the same. The 1966 version of Frontenac and the 1973 version of Frontenac were drastically different but actually had a small overlap of territory around the area of the modern municipality of Adstock.

It was created for the 1973 election, and its final election was in 2008. It disappeared in the 2012 election and its successor electoral districts were the newly created Lotbinière-Frontenac and Mégantic.

The riding was named after a former governor of New France, Louis de Buade de Frontenac.

== Members of the National Assembly ==
- Henri Lecours, Liberal (1973–1976)
- Gilles Grégoire, Parti Québécois – Independent (1976–1985)
- Roger Lefebvre, Liberal (1985–1998)
- Marc Boulianne, Parti Québécois (1998–2003)
- Laurent Lessard, Liberal (2003–2012)

== Election results ==
2008 Quebec general election
Party	Candidate	Votes	%	±%
Liberal	Laurent Lessard	11,785	56.71	
Parti Québécois	Juliette Jalbert	4,852	23.35	
Action démocratique	Paul-Andre Proulx	3,539	17.03	
Québec solidaire	Claudette Lambert	423	2.04	
Parti indépendantiste	Martin Duranleau	183	0.88	

== See also ==
- List of Quebec provincial electoral districts
- Canadian provincial electoral districts
