= Osgood River =

River in Quebec (Canada)

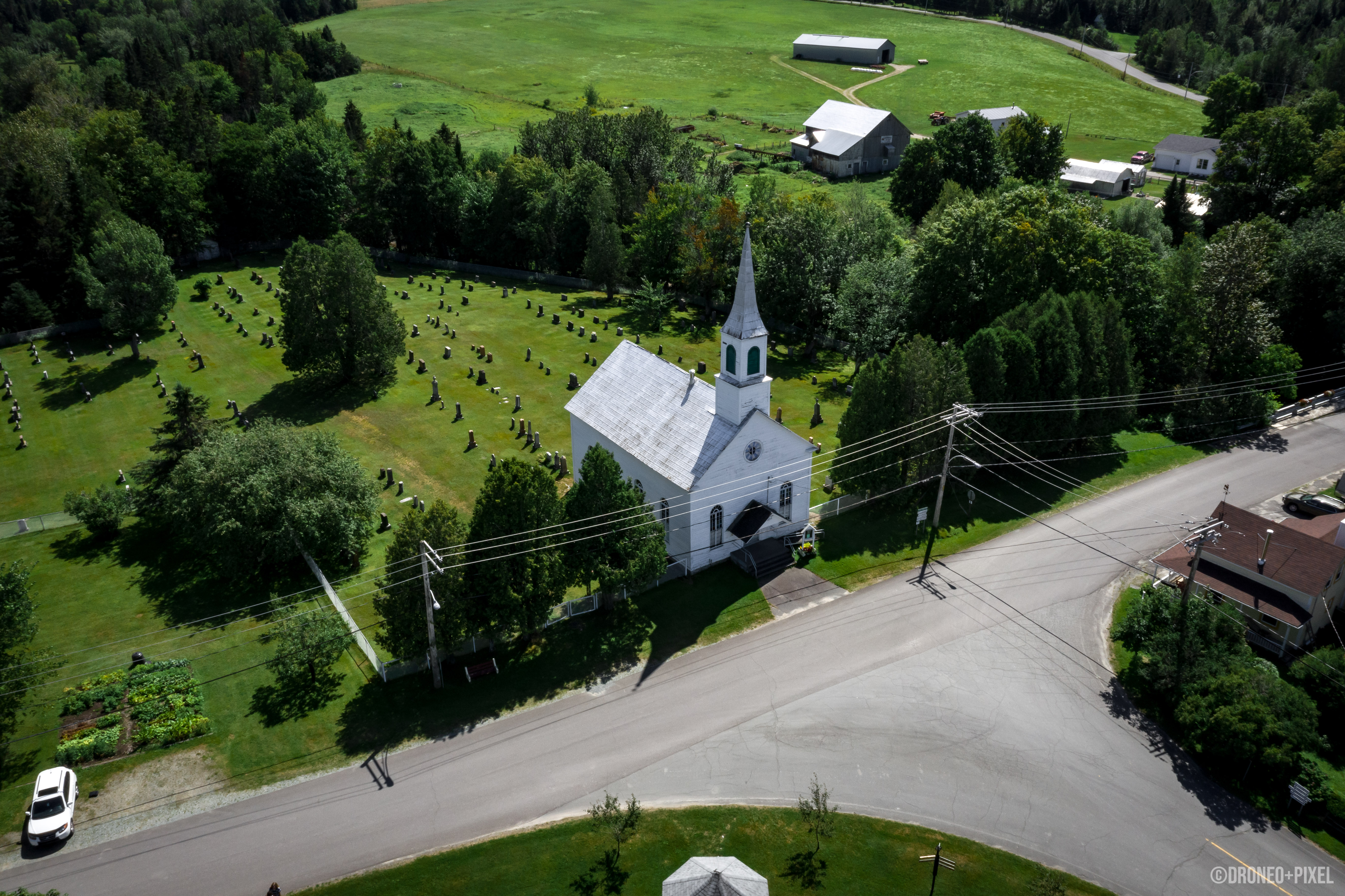
- Kinnear's Mills Presbyterian Church and its cemeteries, along the river.
- Native name: Rivière Osgood (French)

Location
- Country: Canada
- Province: Quebec
- Region: Chaudière-Appalaches
- MRC: Les Appalaches Regional County Municipality

Physical characteristics
- Source: Gagné River, ruisseau Prévost
  - location: Kinnear's Mills
  - coordinates: 46.185641°N 71.285035°W
  - elevation: 553 m (1,814 ft)
- Mouth: Palmer River
  - location: Saint-Jacques-de-Leeds
  - coordinates: 46.29778°N 71.3775°W
  - elevation: 206 m (676 ft)
- Length: 21.4 km (13.3 mi)

Basin features
- Progression: Palmer River, Bécancour River, St. Lawrence River
- Tributaries
  - left: (upstream) ruisseau Prévost, Gagné River
  - right: (upstream) Sunday River

The Osgood River (French: rivière Osgood) is a tributary of the Palmer River, which is a tributary of the Bécancour River, in Quebec, in Canada; the latter being in turn a tributary of the south shore of the St. Lawrence River. The Osgood River flows through the regional county municipalities of:

- L'Érable Regional County Municipality (MRC), in the region administrative office of Centre-du-Québec: municipalities of Kinnear's Mills, Inverness;
- Les Appalaches Regional County Municipality (MRC), in the administrative region of Chaudière-Appalaches: municipalities of Saint-Jacques-de-Leeds.

== Geography ==
The main neighboring watersheds of the Osgood River are:

- north side: Palmer River;
- east side: Sunday River, Perry River, Palmer East River;
- south side: Sunday River, Prévost-Gilbert River, Ashberham River, Blanche River (Thetford Mines), Gagné River, Bagot River;
- west side: Bécancour River, Bullard stream.

The Osgood River has its source in the heart of the hamlet of Plage-Lemieux, at Kinnear's Mills, by the confluence of the Gagné River, and the Prévost stream, a few meters from the road bridge of fourth rank.

From its source, the Osgood River flows on 16.4 kilometres (10.2 mi) in the following segments:

- 6.1 kilometres (3.8 mi) northwesterly to the bridge southwest of the village of Kinnear's Mills;
- 4.6 kilometres (2.9 mi) north, to the route 216 bridge;
- 1.2 kilometres (0.75 mi) north, to the municipal boundary of Inverness;
- 0.6 kilometres (0.37 mi) north, crossing the eastern part of the territory of Inverness, to the municipal limit of Saint-Jacques-de-Leeds;
- 2.6 kilometres (1.6 mi) northerly, passing west of the village of Saint-Jacques-de-Leeds, to the confluence of the Sunday River;
- 1.2 kilometres (0.75 mi) north, crossing route 271, up to its confluence.

The Osgood River empties on the south bank of the Palmer River in the Municipality of Saint-Jacques-de-Leeds. Its confluence is located 1.6 kilometres (0.99 mi) upstream of the municipal boundary of Saint-Jacques-de-Leeds.

== Toponymy ==
The toponym Osgood River evokes the name of the pioneer Osgood who had settled at the beginning of the 19th century along this river. The spelling of this watercourse took the form of Osgoode under the pen of certain authors.

The toponym Osgood River was formalized on October 6, 1983, at the Commission de toponymie du Québec.

== See also ==
- List of rivers of Quebec
