= Noire River (Prévost-Gilbert River tributary) =

River in Chaudière-Appalaches, Quebec (Canada)

- Location within Quebec
- Native name: Rivière Noire (French)

Location
- Country: Canada
- Province: Quebec
- Region: Chaudière-Appalaches
- MRC: Les Appalaches Regional County Municipality

Physical characteristics
- Source: Forest and mountain streams
  - location: Adstock
  - coordinates: 46.114414°N 71.117259°W
  - elevation: 436 metres (1,430 ft)
- Mouth: Prévost-Gilbert River
  - location: Sainte-Clotilde-de-Beauce
  - coordinates: 46.14278°N 71.06277°W
  - elevation: 313 metres (1,027 ft)
- Length: 6.3 kilometres (3.9 mi)

Basin features
- Progression: Prévost-Gilbert River, Bras Saint-Victor, Chaudière River, St. Lawrence River
- River system: St. Lawrence River
- Tributaries
  - left: (upstream)
  - right: (upstream)

The Noire River (in French: rivière Noire) is a tributary of the south bank of the Prévost-Gilbert River which flows on the west bank of the Bras Saint-Victor; the latter in turn empties onto the west bank of the Chaudière River; the latter flows northward to empty on the south shore of the St. Lawrence River. It flows in the municipalities of Adstock (Saint-Method-de-Frontenac sector and Sacré-Cœur-de-Marie-Partie-Sud sector) and Sainte-Clotilde-de-Beauce, in Les Appalaches Regional County Municipality, in the administrative region of Chaudière-Appalaches, in Quebec, in Canada.

== Geography ==
The main neighboring watersheds of the Black River are:

- north side: Prévost-Gilbert River, Nadeau River;
- east side: Prévost-Gilbert River, Bras Saint-Victor, Giguère-Fortin stream, Chaudière River;
- south side: Bras Fortin-Dupuis, Tardif-Bizier stream, Muskrat River;
- west side: Palmer East River, Whetstone River.

The Rivière Noire takes its source in the Petit 13e rang in the northern part of the municipality of Adstock (Saint-Method-de-Frontenac sector), at 2.0 kilometres (1.2 mi) south of the top of the mountain Le Grand Morne (altitude: 594 metres (1,949 ft)), at 1.7 kilometres (1.1 mi) west of a summit (altitude: 519 metres (1,703 ft)), at 4.7 kilometres (2.9 mi) west of the village center of Sainte-Clotilde-de-Beauce, at 5.8 kilometres (3.6 mi) south-east of the village center of "Saint-Coeur-de-Marie-Partie-Sud" of Adstock.

From its source, the Black River flows on 6.3 kilometres (3.9 mi) divided into the following segments:

- 0.5 kilometres (0.31 mi) towards the north, to the limit between Adstock (Saint-Method-de-Frontenac sector) and Saint-Cœur-de-Marie-Partie-Sud de Adstock;
- 1.3 kilometres (0.81 mi) northeasterly, up to the municipal limit of Sainte-Clotilde-de-Beauce;
- 4.0 kilometres (2.5 mi) north-east, passing south of Mont Le Grand Morne, to its confluence.

The Black River flows in a caves valley. It empties on the south shore of the Prévost-Gilbert river in the municipality of Sainte-Clotilde-de-Beauce. The confluence of the Rivière Noire is located at 1.0 kilometre (0.62 mi) southwest of route 271, at 1.7 kilometres (1.1 mi) to the north-west of the summit of Mont de la Sucrerie and 3.0 kilometres (1.9 mi) northwest of the center of the village of Sainte-Clotilde-de-Beauce.

== Toponymy ==
The toponym Rivière Noire was formalized on August 17, 1978, at the Commission de toponymie du Québec.

== See also ==
- List of rivers of Quebec
