= Gagné River =

River in Chaudière-Appalaches, Quebec (Canada)

- Native name: Rivière Gagné (French)

Location
- Country: Canada
- Province: Quebec
- Region: Chaudière-Appalaches
- MRC: Les Appalaches Regional County Municipality

Physical characteristics
- Source: Forested streams
  - location: Thetford Mines
  - coordinates: 46.158636°N 71.31011°W
  - elevation: 450 m (1,480 ft)
- Mouth: Osgood River
  - location: Thetford Mines
  - coordinates: 46.19167°N 71.32611°W
  - elevation: 359 m (1,178 ft)
- Length: 6.5 km (4.0 mi)

Basin features
- Progression: Palmer River, Bécancour River, St. Lawrence River
- Tributaries
  - left: (upstream)
  - right: (upstream)

The Gagné River (in French: rivière Gagné) is a tributary of the Osgood River, whose current flows successively into the Palmer River and Bécancour River; the latter being in turn a tributary of the south shore of the St. Lawrence River.

The Gagné river flows through the municipalities of Thetford Mines and Kinnear's Mills, in Les Appalaches Regional County Municipality, in the administrative region of Chaudière-Appalaches, in Quebec, in Canada.

== Geography ==
The main neighboring watersheds of the Gagné River are:

- north side: Osgood River;
- east side: Sunday River, Perry River, Palmer River;
- south side: Prévost stream, Prévost-Gilbert River, Ashberham River, Bécancour River, Bagot River;
- west side: Old Mill brook, Bullard brook.

The Gagné river has its source in the heart of the village of Pontbriand, in Thetford Mines.

From its source, the Gagné River flows on 6.5 kilometres (4.0 mi) towards the northwest until its confluence.

The Gagné river flows at the confluence of the Osgood River with the Prévost brook in the municipality of Kinnear's Mills, in the heart of the hamlet of Plage-Lemieux. Its confluence is located 0.8 kilometres (0.50 mi) upstream of the municipal border between Kinnear's Mills and Thetford Mines.

== Toponymy ==
The toponym "rivière Gagné" was made official on October 6, 1983, at the Commission de toponymie du Québec.

== See also ==
- List of rivers of Quebec
