= Whetstone River (Palmer River tributary) =

River in Chaudière-Appalaches, Quebec (Canada)

- Native name: Rivière Whetstone (French)

Location
- Country: Canada
- Province: Quebec
- Region: Chaudière-Appalaches
- MRC: Les Appalaches Regional County Municipality

Physical characteristics
- Source: Forest and mountain streams
  - location: Saint-Pierre-de-Broughton
  - coordinates: 46.2257°N 71.1570°W
  - elevation: 538 m (1,765 ft)
- Mouth: Palmer River
  - location: Saint-Pierre-de-Broughton
  - coordinates: 46.23778°N 71.22945°W
  - elevation: 277 m (909 ft)
- Length: 9.2 km (5.7 mi)

Basin features
- River system: Palmer River, Bécancour River, St. Lawrence River
- Tributaries
  - left: (upstream)
  - right: (upstream) ruisseau de la Source

The Whetstone River (in French: rivière Whetstone) is a tributary of the Palmer River whose current flows successively into the Bécancour River, then on the south shore of the St. Lawrence River .

The Whetstone River flows in the municipality of Saint-Pierre-de-Broughton, in the Les Appalaches Regional County Municipality (MRC), in the administrative region of Chaudière-Appalaches, in Quebec, in Canada.

== Geography ==
The main neighboring watersheds of the Whetstone River are:

- north side: Palmer East River;
- east side: Palmer East River;
- south side: Palmer River;
- west side: Palmer River.

The Whetstone River rises on the northeast slope of the "Montagne du Neuf" in the municipality of Saint-Pierre-de-Broughton, at 4.5 kilometres (2.8 mi) east of village and near the ninth rang road.

From the head area (route du 9e rang), the Whetstone River flows over 9.2 kilometres (5.7 mi) divided into the following segments:

- 2.0 kilometres (1.2 mi) northwesterly, to a road bridge;
- 4.7 kilometres (2.9 mi) west, to the 11e rang road bridge, located in the village of Saint-Pierre-de-Broughton;
- 2.5 kilometres (1.6 mi) west, passing south of the village of Saint-Pierre-de-Broughton, to its confluence.

The Whetstone River drains on the east bank of the Palmer River in the Municipality of Saint-Pierre-de-Broughton. Its confluence is located 1.1 km (0.68 mi) upstream of a 15th rang road bridge and 0.6 kilometres (0.37 mi) downstream of the 16th rang, located southwest of the village of Saint-Pierre-de-Broughton.

== Toponymy ==
The toponym "Whetstone River" was made official on December 5, 1968, at the Commission de toponymie du Québec.

== See also ==
- List of rivers of Quebec
