= Blanche River (Thetford Mines) =

River in Chaudière-Appalaches, Quebec (Canada)

- Native name: Rivière Blanche (French)

Location
- Country: Canada
- Province: Quebec
- Region: Chaudière-Appalaches
- MRC: Les Appalaches Regional County Municipality

Physical characteristics
- Source: Forest streams
  - location: Thetford Mines
  - coordinates: 46.123734°N 71.373641°W
  - elevation: 526 m (1,726 ft)
- Mouth: Bécancour River
  - location: Thetford Mines
  - coordinates: 46.055996°N 71.343064°W
  - elevation: 260 m (850 ft)
- Length: 8.2 km (5.1 mi)

Basin features
- Progression: Bécancour River, St. Lawrence River
- Tributaries
  - left: (upstream) ruisseau Tanguay
  - right: (upstream) ruisseau Marcoux

The Blanche river (French: rivière Blanche, pronounced [ʁivjɛʁ blɑ̃ʃ], lit. 'White River') is a tributary of the Bécancour River, which flows into the St. Lawrence River. The Blanche river flows in the municipality of Thetford Mines, in the Les Appalaches Regional County Municipality (MRC), in the administrative region of Chaudière-Appalaches, in the province of Quebec, in Canada.

== Geography ==
The main neighboring watersheds of the Blanche river are:

- to the north: Old Mill Creek, Osgood River, Sunday River, Perry River;
- to the east: Bécancour River, rivière de l'Or, Prévost-Gilbert River;
- in the south: Bécancour River, Coleraine River;
- to the west: Bécancour River, Bagot River.

The Blanche River draws its source from a mountain stream located on the east side of Mont Saint-Adrien and west of downtown Thetford Mines.

The Blanche river flows on 8.2 kilometres (5.1 mi) towards the south, mainly in forest territory, according to the following segments:

- 2.0 kilometres (1.2 mi) south to the road;
- 3.7 kilometres (2.3 mi) southward, up to route 122 which it cuts to the southwest of the city of Thetford Mines;
- 2.5 kilometres (1.6 mi) towards the south, until its mouth.

The Blanche River empties on the north shore of the Bécancour River, northeast of Black Lake, near an open pit mine.

== Toponymy ==
The toponym Rivière Blanche was formalized on December 5, 1975, at the Commission de toponymie du Québec.

== See also ==
- List of rivers of Quebec
