= Palmer East River =

River in Chaudière-Appalaches, Quebec (Canada)

- Native name: Rivière Palmer Est (French)

Location
- Country: Canada
- Province: Quebec
- Region: Chaudière-Appalaches
- MRC: Les Appalaches Regional County Municipality

Physical characteristics
- Source: Forest and mountain streams
  - location: Sacré-Cœur-de-Jésus
  - coordinates: 46.243797°N 71.129756°W
  - elevation: 489 m (1,604 ft)
- Mouth: Palmer River
  - location: Saint-Jacques-de-Leeds
  - coordinates: 46.2925°N 71.27306°W
  - elevation: 248 m (814 ft)
- Length: 16.3 km (10.1 mi)

Basin features
- Progression: Palmer River, Bécancour River, St. Lawrence River
- Tributaries
  - left: (upstream)
  - right: (upstream) ruisseau Saint-Paul

The Palmer East River (in French: rivière Palmer Est) is a tributary of the Palmer River whose current flows successively into the Bécancour River, then on the south shore of the St. Lawrence River. The Palmer East River flows through the municipalities of Sacré-Cœur-de-Jésus, Saint-Pierre-de-Broughton, Saint-Sylvestre (MRC de Lotbinière Regional County Municipality) and Saint-Pierre-de-Broughton, in the Les Appalaches Regional County Municipality (MRC), in the administrative region of Chaudière-Appalaches, in Quebec, in Canada.

== Geography ==
The main neighboring watersheds of the East Palmer River are:

- north side: Beaurivage River, Fourchette River, Filkars River;
- east side: rivière des Fermes, rivière du Cinq, brook of Troisième Rang;
- south side: Palmer River, Prévost-Gilbert River, Cinque River, Nadeau River (Nouvelle-Beauce);
- west side: Palmer River.

The Palmer East River has its source in the eighth rang, on the western slope of a mountain whose summit rises at 561 metres (1,841 ft), to the northwest of the village of East Broughton and east of "Montagne du Neuf". This head area is located in the northwestern part of the municipality of Sacré-Cœur-de-Jésus, almost at the limit of the municipality of Saint-Pierre-de-Broughton.

From its head area, the Palmer East River flows over 16.3 kilometres (10.1 mi) divided into the following segments:

- 0.3 kilometres (0.19 mi) northwesterly, up to the municipal limit of Saint-Pierre-de-Broughton;
- 2.1 kilometres (1.3 mi) northwesterly, in Saint-Pierre-de-Broughton, to the road bridge;
- 1.6 kilometres (0.99 mi) north-west, up to the 16th rang road bridge;
- 3.3 kilometres (2.1 mi) north-west, up to the bridge on the 15th rang road, where it crosses a small hamlet;
- 4.9 kilometres (3.0 mi) towards the north-west, in a valley bordered by mountains, to the municipal limit of Saint-Sylvestre (MRC de Lotbinière Regional County Municipality);
- 1.6 kilometres (0.99 mi) towards the west, with a curve towards the north to collect the water of the Saint-Paul stream (which descends from the mountains), up to the municipal limit of Saint-Jacques-de-Leeds;
- 2.5 kilometres (1.6 mi) towards the south-west, crossing the "route des Érablières", in Saint-Jacques-de-Leeds, to its mouth.

The Palmer River empties onto the east bank of the Palmer River in the Municipality of Saint-Jacques-de-Leeds. Its confluence is located 1.4 kilometres (0.87 mi) downstream from the municipal boundary of Saint-Pierre-de-Broughton.

== Toponymy ==
The toponym Rivière Palmer Est is associated with the Rivière Palmer, the hydronym of which has been known since the second half of the XIXth. Their origin remains unknown despite research done with local pioneers and also many mining prospectors of that time.

The plans of the official cadastre, in particular the 1937 edition, indicate “Rivière des Palmes”, both for the East Palmer River and the main course of the Palmer River. However, residents of the area generally referred to this watercourse as the “Palmer River”.

Some researchers believe that "Palmer River" and "East Palmer River" derive from a phonetic transformation of "Palm River". This form would have been in use among many Irish and Scottish pioneers.

The valley of the Palmer River, immediately south of Saint-Pierre-de-Broughton, contains varieties of reeds that people colloquially refer to as palms.

The toponym Rivière Palmer Est was formalized on December 5, 1968, at the Commission de toponymie du Québec.

== See also ==
- List of rivers of Quebec
