= Rivière du Cinq =

River in Chaudière-Appalaches, Quebec, Canada

- Location within Quebec

Location
- Country: Canada
- Province: Quebec
- Region: Chaudière-Appalaches
- MRC: Les Appalaches Regional County Municipality, Robert-Cliche Regional County Municipality

Physical characteristics
- Source: Lac du Cinq
  - location: Saint-Pierre-de-Broughton
  - coordinates: 46.278079°N 71.10159°W
  - elevation: 601 metres (1,972 ft)
- Mouth: Bras Saint-Victor
  - location: Saint-Victor
  - coordinates: 46.14722°N 70.9275°W
  - elevation: 210 metres (690 ft)
- Length: 23.1 kilometres (14.4 mi)

Basin features
- River system: St. Lawrence River
- Tributaries
  - left: (upstream) ruisseau Pépin, ruisseau Cloutier, ruisseau Roy.
  - right: (upstream) ruisseau Labranche, ruisseau Gosselin, ruisseau Paré, cours d'eau Lessard.

The rivière du Cinq (in English: river of the five) is a tributary of the west bank of Bras Saint-Victor which flows into the Chaudière River; the latter flows northward to empty on the south shore of the St. Lawrence River.

The Rivière du Cinq flows in the administrative region of Chaudière-Appalaches, in Quebec, in Canada, in the MRC of:

- Les Appalaches Regional County Municipality: municipalities Saint-Pierre-de-Broughton and Sacré-Cœur-de-Jésus;
- Robert-Cliche Regional County Municipality: municipality of Saint-Victor.

== Geography ==
The main neighboring watersheds of the Five River are:

- north side: Fourchette River, Saint-Jean stream, Beaurivage River, Lessard River (Chaudière River tributary);
- east side: rivière des Fermes, Chaudière River, Bras Saint-Victor, Nadeau River, Lessard River;
- south side: Bras Saint-Victor, Prévost-Gilbert River;
- west side: Palmer East River, Prévost-Gilbert River.

The Rivière du Cinq has its source at Lac du Cinq (length: 430 metres (1,410 ft); altitude: 601 metres (1,972 ft)) which straddles the municipalities of Saint-Pierre-de-Broughton and Saint-Pierre-de-Broughton. This lake is located north of the village of East Broughton, north of route 112 and south-east of Mont Sainte-Marguerite.

From its source, the Rivière du Cinq flows over 23.1 kilometres (14.4 mi) divided into the following segments:

- 0.3 kilometres (0.19 mi) towards the south, in Saint-Pierre-de-Broughton, to the municipal limit of Sacré-Cœur-de-Jésus;
- 1.4 kilometres (0.87 mi) south to a country road;
- 3.2 kilometres (2.0 mi) south (looping west) to a country road;
- 1.1 kilometres (0.68 mi) towards the south-east, crossing towards the south a small lake, until a country road;
- 1.5 kilometres (0.93 mi) south, up to route 112 which it intersects at 1.4 kilometres (0.87 mi) northeast of the center the village of East Broughton;
- 0.8 kilometres (0.50 mi) towards the south-east, up to the Champagne route;
- 7.3 kilometres (4.5 mi) southeasterly, up to the municipal limit of Saint-Victor;
- 6.4 kilometres (4.0 mi) south-east to a road;
- 1.1 kilometres (0.68 mi) towards the south-east, until its confluence.

The Rivière du Cinq flows on the west bank of the Bras Saint-Victor in the municipality of Saint-Victor. This last river flows into the Chaudière River in Beauceville. The confluence of the Rivière du Cinq is located 0.9 kilometres (0.56 mi) upstream from the confluence of the Prévost-Gilbert River, at 1.5 kilometres (0.93 mi) north-west of center of the village of Saint-Victor and 1.1 kilometres (0.68 mi) north of route 108.

== Toponymy ==
The toponym Rivière du Cinq was made official on June 12, 1970, at the Commission de toponymie du Québec.

== See also ==
- List of rivers of Quebec
