= Perry River (Palmer River tributary) =

River in Chaudière-Appalaches, Quebec (Canada)

- Native name: Rivière Perry (French)

Location
- Country: Canada
- Province: Quebec
- Region: Chaudière-Appalaches
- MRC: Les Appalaches Regional County Municipality

Physical characteristics
- Source: Forest and mountain streams
  - location: Thetford Mines (sector Pontbriand)
  - coordinates: 46.163963°N 71.259317°W
  - elevation: 596 m (1,955 ft)
- Mouth: Palmer River
  - location: Saint-Pierre-de-Broughton
  - coordinates: 46.24694°N 71.2375°W
  - elevation: 277 m (909 ft)
- Length: 13.2 km (8.2 mi)

Basin features
- Progression: Palmer River, Bécancour River, St. Lawrence River
- Tributaries
  - left: (upstream) cours d'eau Cannolly, cours d'eau Huppé.
  - right: (upstream)

The Perry River (in French: rivière Perry) is a tributary of the Palmer River whose current flows successively into the Bécancour River, then on the south shore of the St. Lawrence River. The Perry River flows in the municipalities of Thetford Mines (Pontbriand sector) and Saint-Pierre-de-Broughton, in the Les Appalaches Regional County Municipality (MRC), in the administrative region of Chaudière-Appalaches, in Quebec, in Canada.

== Geography ==
The main neighboring watersheds of the Perry River are:

- north side: Palmer River;
- east side: Palmer River, Rivière du Cinq;
- south side: Palmer River, Prévost-Gilbert River, Bécancour River;
- west side: Osgood River.

The Perry river has its source in the third rang, north of the village of Pontbriand in Thetford Mines and on the northern slope of the "Montagne du Trois", the summit of which is accessible by the chemin des turns.

From its head area, the Perry River flows over 13.2 kilometres (8.2 mi) divided into the following segments:

- 2.3 kilometres (1.4 mi) eastward, up to the confluence of a stream running parallel (south side) to the main course of the river;
- 1.4 kilometres (0.87 mi) north, up to the fourth range road bridge;
- 3.1 kilometres (1.9 mi) north, crossing the 3rd rang road, crossing the municipal limit of Saint-Pierre-de-Broughton, up to the confluence the Connolly Stream;
- 3.5 kilometres (2.2 mi) north-west, passing east of the hamlet "Custeau", to the 15th rang road bridge;
- 2.9 kilometres (1.8 mi) northeasterly, to its mouth.

The Perry River drains on the west bank of the Palmer River in the municipality of Saint-Pierre-de-Broughton. Its confluence is located 1.3 kilometres (0.81 mi) upstream of a road bridge and 6.9 kilometres (4.3 mi) upstream of the municipal boundary of Saint-Pierre-de-Broughton and Saint-Jacques-de-Leeds.

== Toponymy ==
The term "Perry" is a family surname of English origin.

The toponym "rivière Perry" was made official on {October 6, 1983 at the Commission de toponymie du Québec.

== See also ==
- List of rivers of Quebec
