= Sunday River (Osgood River tributary) =

River in Chaudière-Appalaches, Quebec (Canada)

- Native name: Rivière Sunday (French)

Location
- Country: Canada
- Province: Quebec
- Region: Chaudière-Appalaches
- MRC: Les Appalaches Regional County Municipality

Physical characteristics
- Source: Forested streams
  - location: Kinnear's Mills
  - coordinates: 46.211557°N 71.29408°W
  - elevation: 512 m (1,680 ft)
- Mouth: Osgood River
  - location: Saint-Jacques-de-Leeds
  - coordinates: 46.28889°N 71.37083°W
  - elevation: 209 m (686 ft)
- Length: 12 km (7.5 mi)

Basin features
- River system: Osgood River, Bécancour River, St. Lawrence River
- Tributaries
  - left: (upstream)
  - right: (upstream) Ruisseau Craig

The Sunday River (in French: rivière Sunday) is a tributary of the Osgood River, whose course flows successively into the Palmer River and Bécancour River; the latter being in turn a tributary of the south shore of the St. Lawrence River.

The Sunday River flows through the municipalities of Kinnear's Mills and Saint-Jacques-de-Leeds, in the Les Appalaches Regional County Municipality (MRC), in the region administrative office of Chaudière-Appalaches, in Quebec, in Canada.

== Geography ==
The river, once a strong sinuosity, has a length of about 12 kilometres (7.5 mi) after linearization. Its basin has an area of approximately 45 kilometres (27.96 mi). Its bed of gravel has a depth varying from 0.5 to 2.0 metres (1 ft 8 in to 6 ft 7 in) and a width of 5 to 10 metres (16 to 33 ft). The edges suffer from frequent erosion. The river is then diverted from its course, and the new meanders must be linearized again every three years. Also, the bed must be periodically freed from gravel deposits due to erosion. The river is rich in brook trout, but linearization work has compromised the integrity of the habitat.

== Toponymy ==
The name of the Sunday River appears on a 1925 map, but the name probably comes from the construction of Craig Road around 1809. Due to a lack of local manpower, the Governor James Henry Craig made build the way by the military. The latter camped on Sundays near the stream, hence the English name "Sunday River". The toponym was formalized on December 17, 1993.

== See also ==
- List of rivers of Quebec

== Works cited ==
- Lovi, Eric (2012). Concordia University (ed.). Geomorphological Assessment of the Sedimentary Dynamics of the Sunday River, Quebec. p. 124.
- Commission de toponymie du Québec. "Rivière Sunday". Bank of place names in Quebec.
