= Palmer River (Bécancour River tributary) =

River in Chaudière-Appalaches, Quebec (Canada)

- Native name: Rivière Palmer (French)

Location
- Country: Canada
- Province: Quebec
- Region: Chaudière-Appalaches
- MRC: Les Appalaches Regional County Municipality

Physical characteristics
- Source: Forested streams
  - location: Saint-Pierre-de-Broughton
  - coordinates: 46.171935°N 71.161654°W
  - elevation: 386 m (1,266 ft)
- Mouth: Bécancour River
  - location: Saint-Jacques-de-Leeds
  - coordinates: 46.31833°N 71.44889°W
  - elevation: 206 m (676 ft)
- Length: 30.3 km (18.8 mi)

Basin features
- River system: Bécancour River, St. Lawrence River
- Tributaries
  - left: (upstream) cours d'eau Louis, Osgood River, Perry River
  - right: (upstream) branche Tardif, Palmer East River, ruisseau de la Source, Whetstone River

The Palmer River is a tributary of the Bécancour River which is a tributary of the south shore of the St. Lawrence River. The Palmer River flows through the municipalities of Saint-Pierre-de-Broughton and Saint-Jacques-de-Leeds, in the regional county municipality (MRC) of the Les Appalaches Regional County Municipality, in the administrative region of Chaudière-Appalaches, in Quebec, in Canada.

== Geography ==
The main neighboring watersheds of the Palmer River are:

- north side: Armagh River, Saint-Georges River (Chêne River tributary), Saint-André River, Filkars River;
- east side: Nadeau River (Nouvelle-Beauce), Palmer East River, Cinq River;
- south side: Osgood River, Sunday River, Prévost-Gilbert River, Ashberham River;
- west side: Bécancour River.

The river begins in the Eleventh Rang, near a soapstone quarry in the municipality of Saint-Pierre-de-Broughton. This area is located east of the hamlet of Rumpelville and north-west of the hamlet of Broughton Station.

The general course of the Palmer River turns to the northwest. From its source, the Palmer River flows on 30.3 kilometres (18.8 mi) divided into the following segments:

- 6.4 kilometres (4.0 mi), first to the northeast, then to the northwest, to the bridge on the road to third rang;
- 3.4 kilometres (2.1 mi), towards the north-west, passing through the place called "Roche à Vallières" and passing south-west of the village of Saint-Pierre-de-Broughton, to the 16th rang road bridge;
- 8.3 kilometres (5.2 mi) towards the north, collecting water from the Whetstone River (coming from the east) and the Perry River (coming from southwest), crossing the 15th rang and 14th rang roads, up to the municipal limit of Saint-Jacques-de-Leeds;
- 5.5 kilometres (3.4 mi) northwesterly, collecting water from the Palmer East River (coming from the east), to the route 216 located on the south side of the hamlet "Wilson";
- 6.7 kilometres (4.2 mi) heading west, passing 2.5 kilometres (1.6 mi) north of the village center of Saint-Jacques-de-Leeds (i.e. intersection of highways route 216 and route 271), and by collecting the waters of the Osgood River, up to its confluence.

The Palmer River empties on the east bank of the Bécancour River in the municipality of Saint-Jacques-de-Leeds. Its confluence is located 1.5 kilometres (0.93 mi) upstream of the municipal limit of Sainte-Agathe-de-Lotbinière, at 7.6 kilometres (4.7 mi) south of the latter village and at 11.4 kilometres (7.1 mi) west of the center of the village of Saint-Jacques-de-Leeds.

== Toponymy ==
This toponym has been known since the second half of the 19th century. Its origin remains unknown despite research carried out with local pioneers and also many mining prospectors of this time.

The plans of the official cadastre, edition of 1937 in particular, indicate "Rivière des Palmes", as much for the Palmer East river as the main course of the river. However, locals generally referred to this watercourse as the "Palmer River".

Some researchers believe that "Palmer River" and "East Palmer River" derive from a phonetic transformation of "Palm River". This form would have been in use among many Irish and Scottish pioneers.

The valley of this river, immediately south of Saint-Pierre-de-Broughton, contains varieties of reeds that people refer to as palms.

The toponym "rivière Palmer" was made official on December 5, 1968, at the Commission de toponymie du Québec.

== See also ==
- List of rivers of Quebec
