= Lotbinière-Frontenac =

Provincial electoral district in Quebec, Canada

Quebec electoral district

Provincial electoral district
- Legislature: National Assembly of Quebec
MNA
Renaud Labrecque
Conservative
- District created: 2011
- First contested: 2012
- Last contested: 2026

Demographics
- Electors (2012): 53,917
- Area (km²): 3,317.6
- Census division(s): Lotbinière, Les Appalaches
- Census subdivision(s): Adstock, Dosquet, East Broughton, Irlande, Kinnear's Mills, Laurier-Station, Leclercville, Lotbinière, Notre-Dame-du-Sacré-Cœur-d'Issoudun, Sacré-Cœur-de-Jésus, Saint-Adrien-d'Irlande, Saint-Agapit, Sainte-Agathe-de-Lotbinière, Saint-Antoine-de-Tilly, Saint-Apollinaire, Sainte-Croix, Saint-Édouard-de-Lotbinière, Saint-Flavien, Saint-Fortunat, Saint-Gilles, Saint-Jacques-de-Leeds, Saint-Jacques-le-Majeur-de-Wolfestown, Saint-Janvier-de-Joly, Saint-Jean-de-Brébeuf, Saint-Joseph-de-Coleraine, Saint-Julien, Saint-Narcisse-de-Beaurivage, Saint-Patrice-de-Beaurivage, Saint-Pierre-de-Broughton, Saint-Sylvestre, Thetford Mines, Val-Alain

Lotbinière-Frontenac is a provincial electoral district in the Chaudière-Appalaches region of Quebec, Canada, which elects members to the National Assembly of Quebec. It consists of the entirety of Lotbinière Regional County Municipality and nearly all of Les Appalaches Regional County Municipality. It includes the municipalities of Thetford Mines, Saint-Apollinaire, Saint-Agapit, Saint-Gilles, Adstock, Laurier-Station, Sainte-Croix, East Broughton and Saint-Joseph-de-Coleraine.

It was created for the 2012 election from parts of the former Lotbinière and Frontenac electoral districts; Saint-Fortunat was also taken from Richmond electoral district.

== Members of the National Assembly ==
| Legislature | Years | Member | Party |
|---|---|---|---|
Riding created from Lotbinière, Frontenac and Richmond
| 40th | 2012–2014 | Laurent Lessard | Liberal |
| 41st | 2014–2018 | Laurent Lessard | Liberal |
| 42nd | 2018–2022 | Isabelle Lecours | Coalition Avenir Québec |
| 43rd | 2022–2026 | Isabelle Lecours | Coalition Avenir Québec |
| 44th | 2026–Present | Renaud Labrecque | Conservative |

== Election results ==
2026 Quebec general election
** Preliminary results — Not yet official **
| Party | Candidate | Votes | % | ±% |
|---|---|---|---|---|
| Conservative | Renaud Labrecque | 23,976 | 54.39 | |
| Parti Québécois | Jonathan Moreau | 8,118 | 18.42 | |
| Liberal | Ludovic Beauregard | 5,647 | 12.81 | |
| Coalition Avenir Québec | Roch Gamache | 4,154 | 9.42 | |
| Québec solidaire | Elisabeth St-Aubin | 1,827 | 4.14 | |
| Climat Québec | Charles-Eugène Bergeron | 205 | 0.47 | |
| Démocratie directe | Violette L'Ecuyer | 154 | 0.35 | |
| Total valid votes | | | | |
| Total rejected ballots | | | | |
| Turnout | | | 74.99 | |
| Electors on the lists | | | | |
Source: Élections Québec

2022 Quebec general election
| Party | Candidate | Votes | % | ±% |
|---|---|---|---|---|
| Coalition Avenir Québec | Isabelle Lecours | 18,330 | 43.72% | -10.06 |
| Conservative | Christian Gauthier | 13,503 | 32.20% | +28.48 |
| Québec solidaire | Christine Gilbert | 3,925 | 9.36% | -0.13 |
| Parti Québécois | Louise Marchand | 3,688 | 8.80% | -0.69 |
| Liberal | Normand Côté | 2,483 | 5.92% | -14.53 |
| Total valid votes | | 41,929 | 98.67% | |
| Total rejected ballots | | 565 | 1.33% | |
| Turnout | | 42,494 | 73.86% | |
| Electors on the lists | | 57,531 | – | – |

2018 Quebec general election
| Party | Candidate | Votes | % | ±% |
|---|---|---|---|---|
| Coalition Avenir Québec | Isabelle Lecours | 20,360 | 53.78 | +24.01 |
| Liberal | Pierre-Luc Daigle | 7,742 | 20.45 | -28.51 |
| Québec solidaire | Normand Beaudet | 3,593 | 9.49 | +5.93 |
| Parti Québécois | Yohann Beaulieu | 3,591 | 9.49 | -6.11 |
| Conservative | Réjean Labbé | 1,410 | 3.72 | +2.67 |
| Green | Marie-Claude Dextraze | 655 | 1.73 | |
| Citoyens au pouvoir | Yves Roy | 304 | 0.8 | |
| Parti 51 | Daniel Croteau | 200 | 0.53 | |
| Total valid votes | | 37,855 | 98.07 | |
| Total rejected ballots | | 746 | 1.93 | |
| Turnout | | 38,601 | 69.45 | |
| Eligible voters | | 55,581 | | |
| Coalition Avenir Québec gain from Liberal | | Swing | | +26.26 |
Source(s) "Rapport des résultats officiels du scrutin". Élections Québec.

2014 Quebec general election
| Party | Candidate | Votes | % |
|---|---|---|---|
| Liberal | Laurent Lessard | 19,296 | 48.96 |
| Coalition Avenir Québec | Luc de la Sablonnière | 11,735 | 29.77 |
| Parti Québécois | Kaven Mathieu | 6,147 | 15.60 |
| Québec solidaire | Nadia Blouin | 1,403 | 3.56 |
| Conservative | Sylvain Rancourt | 414 | 1.05 |
| Option nationale | Annie Grégoire-Gauthier | 193 | 0.49 |
| Independent | Rodrigue Leblanc | 143 | 0.36 |
| Mon pays le Québec | Denis Cadieux | 83 | 0.21 |
| Total valid votes | | 39,414 | 98.70 |
| Total rejected ballots | | 518 | 1.30 |
| Turnout | | 39,932 | 73.57 |
| Electors on the lists | | 54,278 | – |

2012 Quebec general election
| Party | Candidate | Votes | % | ±% |
|---|---|---|---|---|
| Liberal | Laurent Lessard | 17,681 | 43.32 | -4.87 |
| Coalition Avenir Québec | Martin Caron | 12,725 | 31.17 | +1.80 |
| Parti Québécois | Kaven Mathieu | 8,629 | 21.14 | +1.30 |
| Québec solidaire | Marie-Christine Rochefot | 1,783 | 4.37 | +2.27 |
| Total valid votes | | 40,818 | 98.37 | – |
| Total rejected ballots | | 675 | 1.63 | – |
| Turnout | | 41,493 | 77.06 | |
| Electors on the lists | | 53,843 | – | – |
| Liberal notional hold | | Swing | | -3.34 |

^ Change is from redistributed results. CAQ change is from ADQ.

== See also ==
- List of Quebec provincial electoral districts
- Canadian provincial electoral districts
