= Chemin Craig =

Craig Road was a road created in the early 19th century on the order of James Henry Craig, Governor of British North America. It was intended to connect Quebec City with the United States and to promote settlement of the Eastern Townships.

== History ==
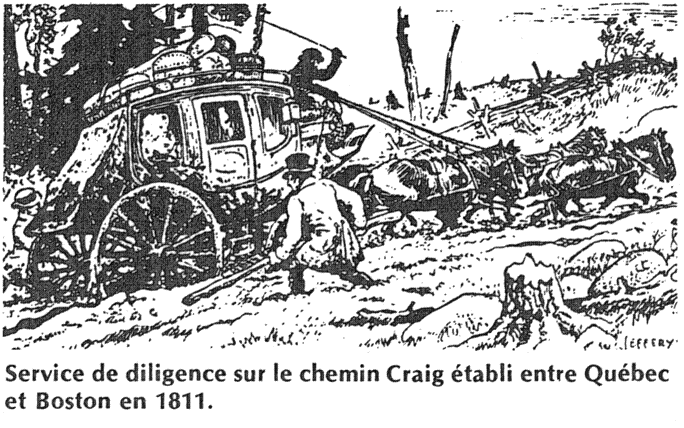
"Stagecoach service on the Chemin Craig established between Quebec and Boston in 1811."

At the turn of the 19th century, in Lower Canada, nearly all of the population lived in communities along the St. Lawrence River. The land between the river and the US border had been surveyed and was ready for settlement. In 1810, Governor James Henry Craig authorized construction of a road to link Quebec and the US city of Boston. He also wanted to promote colonization of the Eastern Townships by anglophones. His ultimate goal was to assimilate the French-Canadian population. The planned route went from Saint-Gilles to Richmond, where an existing road (modern-day Quebec Route 143) continued to the Canadian–American border.

Construction of the road began in August 1810 and took three months. The workforce of 180 soldiers cut trees and built bridges to make the road suitable for traffic. Although the terrain was muddy and damaged in several places, it was suitable enough for a winter stagecoach service, which was established in January 1811 and took passengers from Quebec to Boston in only six days. The service ended at the March thaw and was later abandoned completely because of the difficult travelling conditions, including Lipsey's Hill.

The War of 1812 led to the abandonment of the road. Several bridges were destroyed, and the road became overgrown as nature took its toll. Although some repairs were made, the road was declared unfit for passage in 1829. To relieve that problem, Gosford Road was built to promote settlement in the area.

Craig Road had a mixed success. It opened the territory to new inhabitants, but the results were far from what the planners had desired. Not enough English-speaking settlers arrived, and the goal to assimilate the French Canadians failed. On the contrary, it was the French Canadians who settled the region and became the majority.

In 1983, the Quebec writer Madeleine Ferron published the novel Sur le Chemin Craig, which describes how Irish immigrants settled in the Beauce region of Quebec during the mid-19th century.

== Route ==
Chemin Craig begins in Saint-Gilles, southwest of Quebec City. It continues through the town of Saint-Jacques-de-Leeds and the canton of Inverness. It then passes near Kinnear's Mills and through Saint-Jean-de-Brébeuf and Irlande. The path from Saint-Gilles to Saint-Ferdinand d'Halifax corresponds to modern-day Quebec Route 216. From Saint-Ferdinand, the road continues through Vianney, Chester-Est, Chesterville, and Tingwick. It then passes through Danville, where it joins Route 116 until Richmond. The rest of the route past Richmond follows modern-day Route 143. Heading towards the US, it passes through Windsor, Bromptonville, Sherbrooke, Ayer's Cliff and finally Stanstead, at the international border.
