= Craig Road =

Craig Road may refer to:

- Craig Road (Singapore)
- Craig Road (Las Vegas)
- Chemin Craig, a historical road in Quebec
