= Laurent Lessard =

Canadian politician and notary (born 1962)

Member of the National Assembly of Quebec for Frontenac
- In office April 14, 2003 – September 4, 2012
- Preceded by: Marc Boulianne
- Succeeded by: riding redistributed

Member of the National Assembly of Quebec for Lotbinière-Frontenac
- In office September 4, 2012 – August 29, 2018
- Preceded by: first member
- Succeeded by: Isabelle Lecours

Personal details
- Born: October 28, 1962 (age 63) Thetford Mines, Quebec
- Party: Quebec Liberal Party
- Profession: notary
- Cabinet: Municipal Affairs and Regions and Land Occupancy

Laurent Lessard (born October 28, 1962, in Thetford Mines, Quebec) is a politician and notary in Quebec, Canada. He was the Member of the National Assembly for the provincial ridings of Frontenac and Lotbinière-Frontenac from 2003 to 2018 in Central Quebec south of Quebec City. Member of the Quebec Liberal Party, he was the Minister of Agriculture, Fisheries and Food and the Minister responsible for the Centre-du-Québec region which includes Victoriaville and Drummondville.

== Biography ==
Lessard obtained a licence in law at the Université de Sherbrooke. He was a notary from 1989 to 1998 before being elected as mayor of Thetford Mines in 1999. He would also be a member of the executive committee of the L'Amiante Regional County Municipality, Quebec.

He jumped to provincial politics in the 2003 provincial election and was elected in Frontenac. After being for nearly two years the Parliamentary Secretary for the Minister of Municipal Affairs, Sport and Leisure he would become after a Cabinet shuffle the Minister of Labour in 2005. When Yvon Vallières took time off for health reasons in 2006, he would temporarily had the portfolios of Agriculture, Fisheries and Food for a few weeks before obtaining them after the 2007 elections when Vaillières was no longer part of the cabinet. He was also temporarily the Minister responsible for Chaudière-Appalaches prior to the 2007 elections.

Lessard kept the same Cabinet positions following the Liberal majority gained in the 2008 elections. On June 23, 2009, following a Cabinet shuffle, Lessard replaced Nathalie Normandeau as the Minister of Municipal Affairs and Regions and Land Occupancy while Claude Béchard became the new Minister of Agriculture.

Political offices
Preceded by Michel Després	Minister of Labour; 2005–2007	Succeeded by David Whissell
Preceded by Yvon Vallières	Minister of Agriculture, Fisheries and Food; 2007–2009	Succeeded by Claude Bechard
Preceded by Nathalie Normandeau	Minister of Municipal Affairs and Regions and Land Occupancy; 2009–2012	Succeeded by Sylvain Gaudreault
