= Isabelle Lecours =

Canadian politician

Member of the National Assembly of Quebec for Lotbinière-Frontenac
- In office October 1, 2018 – August 27, 2026
- Preceded by: Laurent Lessard
- Succeeded by: Renaud Labrecque

Personal details
- Born: 1971 Quebec City
- Party: Coalition Avenir Québec

Isabelle Lecours is a Canadian politician, who was elected to the National Assembly of Quebec in the 2018 provincial election. She represented the electoral district of Lotbinière-Frontenac as a member of the Coalition Avenir Québec. She did not seek re-election in the 2026 general election.

== Electoral record ==
2022 Quebec general election: Lotbinière-Frontenac
Party	Candidate	Votes	%	±%
Coalition Avenir Québec	Isabelle Lecours	18,330	43.72%	-10.06
Conservative	Christian Gauthier	13,503	32.20%	+28.48
Québec solidaire	Christine Gilbert	3,925	9.36%	-0.13
Parti Québécois	Louise Marchand	3,688	8.80%	-0.69
Liberal	Normand Côté	2,483	5.92%	-14.53
Total valid votes		41,929	98.67%	
Total rejected ballots		565	1.33%	
Turnout		42,494	73.86%	
Electors on the lists		57,531	–	–

2018 Quebec general election: Lotbinière-Frontenac
Party	Candidate	Votes	%	±%
Coalition Avenir Québec	Isabelle Lecours	20,360	53.78	+24.01
Liberal	Pierre-Luc Daigle	7,742	20.45	-28.51
Québec solidaire	Normand Beaudet	3,593	9.49	+5.93
Parti Québécois	Yohann Beaulieu	3,591	9.49	-6.11
Conservative	Réjean Labbé	1,410	3.72	+2.67
Green	Marie-Claude Dextraze	655	1.73	
Citoyens au pouvoir	Yves Roy	304	0.8	
Parti 51	Daniel Croteau	200	0.53	
Total valid votes		37,855	98.07	
Total rejected ballots		746	1.93	
Turnout		38,601	69.45	
Eligible voters		55,581		
Coalition Avenir Québec gain from Liberal		Swing		+26.26
Source(s) "Rapport des résultats officiels du scrutin". Élections Québec.
