= Big Stone City, South Dakota =

- City
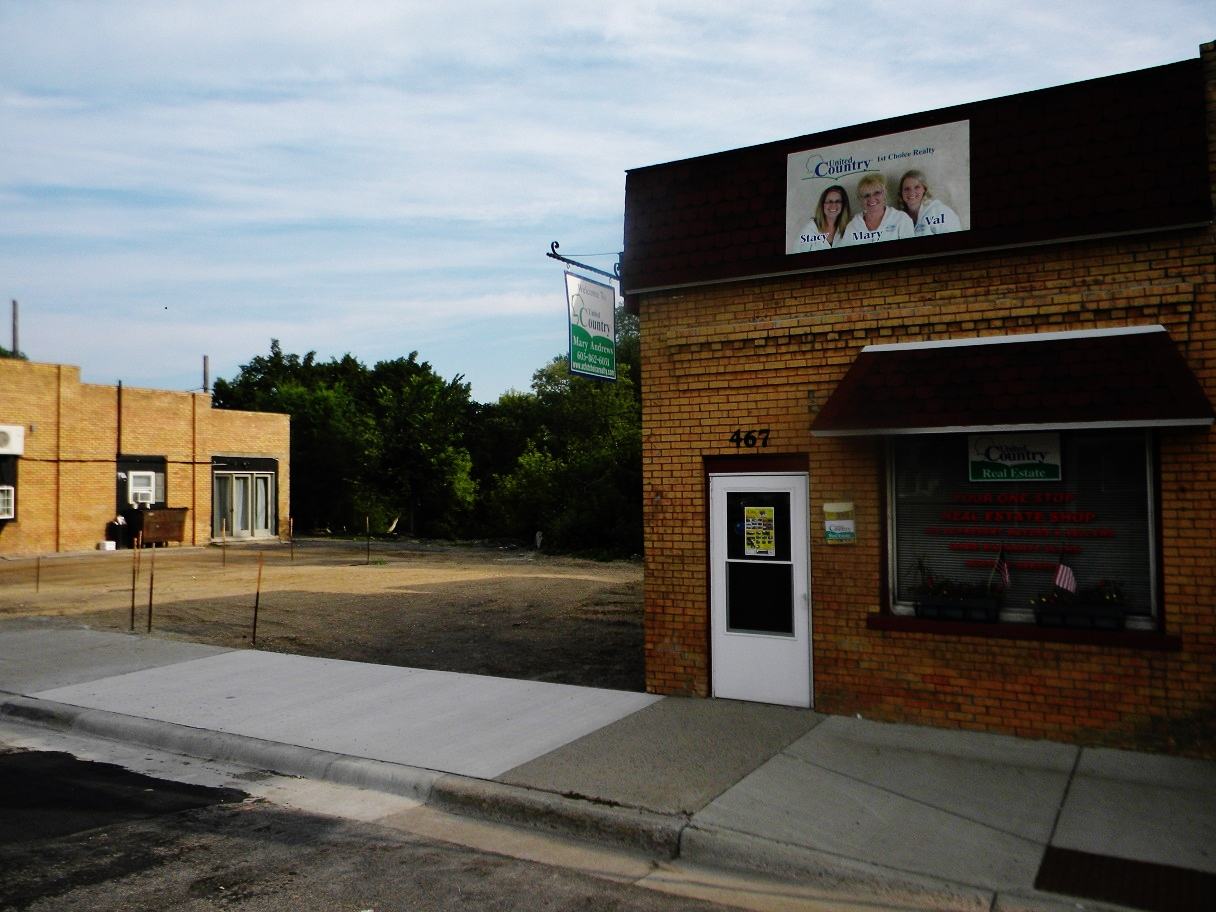
- Big Stone City Hall, July 2015
- Motto: "Home Of Big Stone Lake"
- Location in Grant County and the state of South Dakota
- Coordinates: 45°17′55″N 96°27′56″W
- Country: United States
- State: South Dakota
- County: Grant
- Incorporated: 1885

Area
  - Total: 1.20 sq mi (3.10 km^{2})
  - Land: 1.20 sq mi (3.10 km^{2})
  - Water: 0 sq mi (0.00 km^{2})
- Elevation: 1,089 ft (332 m)

Population (2020)
  - Total: 412
  - Density: 344/sq mi (132.8/km^{2})
- Time zone: UTC-6 (Central (CST))
  - Summer (DST): UTC-5 (CDT)
- ZIP code: 57216
- Area code: 605
- FIPS code: 46-05540
- GNIS feature ID: 2394165
- Website: bigstonecitysd.gov

Big Stone City is a city in the northeastern corner of Grant County, South Dakota, United States, that lies between the southern tip of Big Stone Lake and the northern bank of the Whetstone River, and is adjacent to the city of Ortonville, Minnesota. The population was 412 at the 2020 census.

== History ==
The community now known as Big Stone City was established in 1878 as Inkpa City (after Chief Inkpaduta). It served as the seat of Grant County from 1880 to 1883. The present name comes from nearby Big Stone Lake. Big Stone City was incorporated in 1885.

== Geography ==
According to the United States Census Bureau, the city has a total area of 1.20 square miles (3.11 km^{2}), all land.

== Demographics ==
Historical population
Census	Pop.	Note	%±
1880	376		—
1890	471		25.3%
1900	590		25.3%
1910	551		−6.6%
1920	630		14.3%
1930	617		−2.1%
1940	681		10.4%
1950	829		21.7%
1960	718		−13.4%
1970	631		−12.1%
1980	672		6.5%
1990	669		−0.4%
2000	605		−9.6%
2010	467		−22.8%
2020	412		−11.8%
U.S. Decennial Census

=== 2020 census ===
As of the 2020 census, Big Stone City had a population of 412. The median age was 55.9 years. 13.6% of residents were under the age of 18 and 30.1% of residents were 65 years of age or older. For every 100 females there were 109.1 males, and for every 100 females age 18 and over there were 103.4 males age 18 and over.

0.0% of residents lived in urban areas, while 100.0% lived in rural areas.

There were 219 households in Big Stone City, of which 15.5% had children under the age of 18 living in them. Of all households, 43.8% were married-couple households, 26.9% were households with a male householder and no spouse or partner present, and 24.7% were households with a female householder and no spouse or partner present. About 40.6% of all households were made up of individuals and 26.1% had someone living alone who was 65 years of age or older.

There were 286 housing units, of which 23.4% were vacant. The homeowner vacancy rate was 1.7% and the rental vacancy rate was 21.5%.

Racial composition as of the 2020 census
Race	Number	Percent
White	385	93.4%
Black or African American	1	0.2%
American Indian and Alaska Native	1	0.2%
Asian	3	0.7%
Native Hawaiian and Other Pacific Islander	0	0.0%
Some other race	5	1.2%
Two or more races	17	4.1%
Hispanic or Latino (of any race)	12	2.9%

=== 2010 census ===
As of the census of 2010, there were 467 people, 236 households, and 134 families residing in the city. The population density was 389.2 inhabitants per square mile (150.3/km^{2}). There were 314 housing units at an average density of 261.7 per square mile (101.0/km^{2}). The racial makeup of the city was 97.9% White, 0.2% Native American, 0.4% Asian, 1.1% from other races, and 0.4% from two or more races. Hispanic or Latino of any race were 1.3% of the population.

There were 236 households, of which 17.4% had children under the age of 18 living with them, 47.5% were married couples living together, 5.9% had a female householder with no husband present, 3.4% had a male householder with no wife present, and 43.2% were non-families. 39.4% of all households were made up of individuals, and 16.9% had someone living alone who was 65 years of age or older. The average household size was 1.98 and the average family size was 2.60.

The median age in the city was 50.5 years. 16.9% of residents were under the age of 18; 4.4% were between the ages of 18 and 24; 17.6% were from 25 to 44; 39.7% were from 45 to 64; and 21.6% were 65 years of age or older. The gender makeup of the city was 50.5% male and 49.5% female.

=== 2000 census ===
As of the census of 2000, there were 605 people, 254 households, and 166 families residing in the city. The population density was 491.5 inhabitants per square mile (189.8/km^{2}). There were 309 housing units at an average density of 251.0 per square mile (96.9/km^{2}). The racial makeup of the city was 99.17% White, 0.50% Native American, and 0.33% from two or more races.

There were 254 households, out of which 29.9% had children under the age of 18 living with them, 59.8% were married couples living together, 3.9% had a female householder with no husband present, and 34.3% were non-families. 31.1% of all households were made up of individuals, and 14.6% had someone living alone who was 65 years of age or older. The average household size was 2.33 and the average family size was 2.96.

In the city, the population was spread out, with 22.8% under the age of 18, 6.0% from 18 to 24, 25.5% from 25 to 44, 26.8% from 45 to 64, and 19.0% who were 65 years of age or older. The median age was 42 years. For every 100 females, there were 97.1 males. For every 100 females age 18 and over, there were 97.9 males.

The median income for a household in the city was $31,250, and the median income for a family was $39,583. Males had a median income of $22,875 versus $17,417 for females. The per capita income for the city was $19,297. About 7.4% of families and 11.2% of the population were below the poverty line, including 17.7% of those under age 18 and 16.5% of those age 65 or over.

== Economy ==
In May 2026, Antora Energy and POET announced the commissioning of a 5 GWh multi-day thermal energy storage system at POET's bioprocessing facility in Big Stone City. The system uses thermal batteries containing solid carbon blocks to store energy as heat and supply it to the facility's industrial processes. The companies stated that the system would become fully operational later in 2026.

== Education ==
Big Stone City School District 25-1 is the local school district.

== See also ==
- List of cities in South Dakota
