= Renaud Labrecque =

Canadian politician

Renaud Labrecque MNA

Member of the National Assembly for Lotbinière-Frontenac
- Incumbent
- Assumed office October 5, 2026
- Preceded by: Isabelle Lecours

Personal details
- Party: Conservative

Renaud Labrecque is a Canadian politician who is a candidate for the National Assembly of Quebec for Lotbinière-Frontenac in the 2026 Quebec general election as a member of the Conservative Party of Quebec.

Before his election, Labrecque was a kicker for the Concordia Stingers in his college years before playing his professional career with the Jacksonville Sharks arena football team. After his sports career, he became the general manager of Parisville.

== Electoral history ==
2026 Quebec general election: Lotbinière-Frontenac
** Preliminary results — Not yet official **
Party	Candidate	Votes	%	±%
Conservative	Renaud Labrecque	23,976	54.39	
Parti Québécois	Jonathan Moreau	8,118	18.42	
Liberal	Ludovic Beauregard	5,647	12.81	
Coalition Avenir Québec	Roch Gamache	4,154	9.42	
Québec solidaire	Elisabeth St-Aubin	1,827	4.14	
Climat Québec	Charles-Eugène Bergeron	205	0.47	
Démocratie directe	Violette L'Ecuyer	154	0.35	
Total valid votes				
Total rejected ballots				
Turnout			74.99	
Electors on the lists				
Source: Élections Québec
