= Saint-Fortunat =

- Municipality
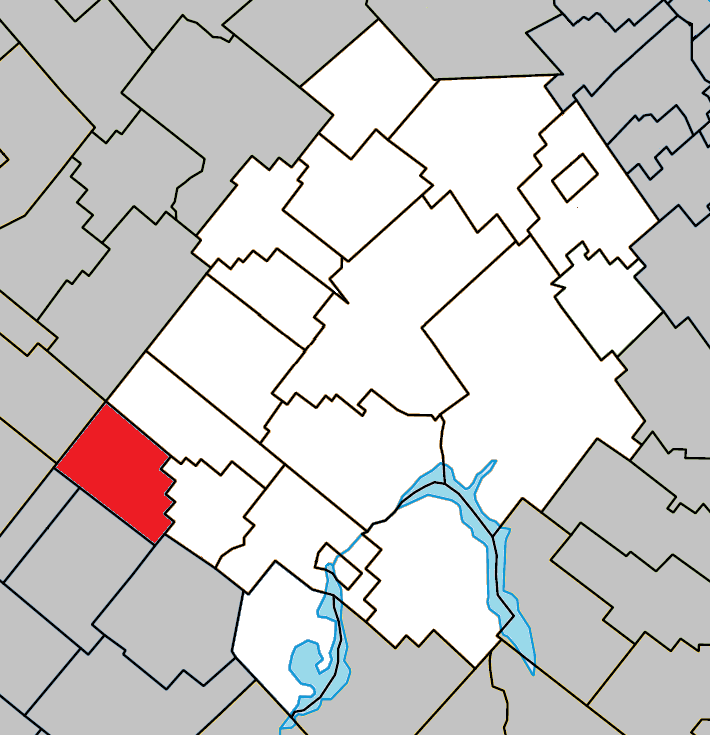
- Location within Les Appalaches RCM.

- Location in province of Quebec.
- Coordinates: 45°58′N 71°36′W
- Country: Canada
- Province: Quebec
- Region: Chaudière-Appalaches
- RCM: Les Appalaches
- Constituted: January 1, 1873

Government
  - Mayor: Denis Fortier
  - Federal riding: Mégantic—L'Érable—Lotbinière
  - Prov. riding: Lotbinière-Frontenac

Area
  - Total: 76.60 km^{2} (29.58 sq mi)
  - Land: 76.09 km^{2} (29.38 sq mi)

Population (2021)
  - Total: 255
  - Density: 3.4/km^{2} (8.8/sq mi)
  - Pop 2016-2021: ▼3%
  - Dwellings: 164
- Time zone: UTC−5 (EST)
  - Summer (DST): UTC−4 (EDT)
- Postal code(s): G0P 1G0
- Area code: 819
- Highways: R-216; R-263
- Website: www.municipalite saint-fortunat.net

Saint-Fortunat (French pronunciation: [sɛ̃ fɔʁtyna]) is a municipality located in the Municipalité régionale de comté des Appalaches in Quebec, Canada. It is part of the Chaudière-Appalaches region and the population is 255 as of 2021. It was named after Christian poet Venantius Fortunatus.

== History ==
The area was formely part of Wolfestown (now named Saint-Julien). The first settlers arrived in the area around 1856. The Catholic mission was established in 1867. By the early 1870s, it comprised a chapel and a cemetery. The sector officialy split from Wolfestown in 1872 to become the municipality of Saint-Fortunat-de-Wolfestown. The church was built the same year. In 1960, the named was shortened to become simply Saint-Fortunat.
