= East Broughton Station =

District in Canada

East Broughton Station is a district (secteur) of the municipality of East Broughton, Quebec, Canada.

Prior to January 5, 1994, East Broughton Station was an independent municipality; on that date, it was merged with the municipality of East Broughton.

== History ==
The sector was originally part of East Broughton. In 1955, the sector became an independent municipality under the name of East Broughton Station. In 1994, the municipality was remerged with East Broughton.

== Demographics ==
Historical census populations – East Broughton Station
(1955–1994)

Year	Pop.	±%
1956	1,060	—
1961	1,136	+7.2%
1966	1,093	−3.8%
1971	1,127	+3.1%

Year	Pop.	±%
1976	1,191	+5.7%
1981	1,302	+9.3%
1986	1,251	−3.9%
1991	1,191	−4.8%

Source: Statistics Canada
