= Prévost-Gilbert River =

River in Chaudière-Appalaches, Quebec (Canada)

Prévost-Gilbert River Old name: Ruisseau Tring
- Location within Quebec
- Native name: Rivière Prévost-Gilbert (French)

Location
- Country: Canada
- Province: Quebec
- Region: Chaudière-Appalaches
- MRC: Les Appalaches Regional County Municipality, Robert-Cliche Regional County Municipality

Physical characteristics
- Source: Unidentified lake
  - location: Thetford Mines
  - coordinates: 46.160402°N 71.244553°W
  - elevation: 506 metres (1,660 ft)
- Mouth: Bras Saint-Victor
  - location: Saint-Victor
  - coordinates: 46.14028°N 70.93333°W
  - elevation: 218 metres (715 ft)
- Length: 31 kilometres (19 mi)

Basin features
- Progression: Bras Saint-Victor, Chaudière River, St. Lawrence River
- River system: St. Lawrence River
- Tributaries
  - left: (upstream) ruisseau Provost, cours d'eau Lessard, cours d'eau Gagnon, ruisseau Gamache.
  - right: (upstream) rivière Fortin-Dupuis, rivière Noire, cours d'eau Thivierge, branche Thivierge, ruisseau Lachance.

The Prévost-Gilbert river (in French: rivière Prévost-Gilbert) is a tributary of the west bank of the Bras Saint-Victor which flows into the Chaudière River; the latter flows northward to empty on the south shore of the St. Lawrence River. It flows in the administrative region of Chaudière-Appalaches, in Quebec, in Canada, in MRC of:

- Les Appalaches Regional County Municipality: municipalities Thetford Mines (Robertsonville sector), Adstock (Sacré-Cœur-de-Marie-Partie-Sud sector), Sacré-Cœur-de-Jésus, Sainte-Clotilde-de-Beauce;
- Robert-Cliche Regional County Municipality: municipality of Saint-Victor.

== Geography ==
The main neighboring watersheds of the Prévost-Gilbert River are:

- north side: Nadeau River, Palmer River, Whetstone River, Perry River;
- east side: Chaudière River, Bras Saint-Victor, rivière du Cinq, Noire River;
- south side: Bras Saint-Victor, Fortin-Dupuis River, rivière des Hamel;
- west side: Gagné River, Bécancour River.

The Prévost-Gilbert River takes its source at the outlet of a small lake located 1.0 kilometre (0.62 mi) northeast of the village of Pontbriand (town of Thetford Mines, on the southern slope of Montagne du Trois, northwest of the village of Robertsonville and 0.6 kilometres (0.37 mi) northeast of route 269.

From its source, the Prévost-Gilbert River flows over 31 kilometres (19 mi) divided into the following segments:

- 1.8 kilometres (1.1 mi) southeasterly, in the Pontbriand sector of the city of Thetford Mines, to the limit between the Pontbriand and Robertsonville sectors;
- 2.9 kilometres (1.8 mi) eastward, to route 112;
- 3.6 kilometres (2.2 mi) eastward, up to the limit between the sectors of Robertsonville and Sacré-Cœur-de-Marie-Partie-Sud;
- 1.8 kilometres (1.1 mi) east, to a country road;
- 1.5 kilometres (0.93 mi) eastward, up to the municipal limit of Sacré-Cœur-de-Jésus;
- 3.1 kilometres (1.9 mi) towards the south-east, crossing a country road, to the limit of Sainte-Clotilde-de-Beauce;
- 4.8 kilometres (3.0 mi) south-east, up to route 271 which it intersects at 1.4 kilometres (0.87 mi) to the north-west from the center of the village of Sainte-Clotilde-de-Beauce;
- 4.7 kilometres (2.9 mi) eastward, crossing the Ponterlegil dam, up to a road that leads to the municipality of Sainte-Clotilde-de-Beauce and Saint-Victor;
- 2.1 kilometres (1.3 mi) east, to a country road bridge;
- 2.8 kilometres (1.7 mi) eastward, up to its confluence.

The Prévost-Gilbert River flows onto the west bank of the Bras Saint-Victor in the municipality of Saint-Victor. This last river flows into the Chaudière river in Beauceville. The confluence of the Prévost-Gilbert River is located 2.0 kilometres (1.2 mi) west of the center of the village of Saint-Victor and 0.9 kilometres (0.56 mi) north of the route 108.

== Toponymy ==
The toponym Rivière Prévost-Gilbert was formalized on October 6, 1983, at the Commission de toponymie du Québec.

== See also ==
- List of rivers of Quebec
