= Sainte-Clotilde-de-Beauce =

- Municipality
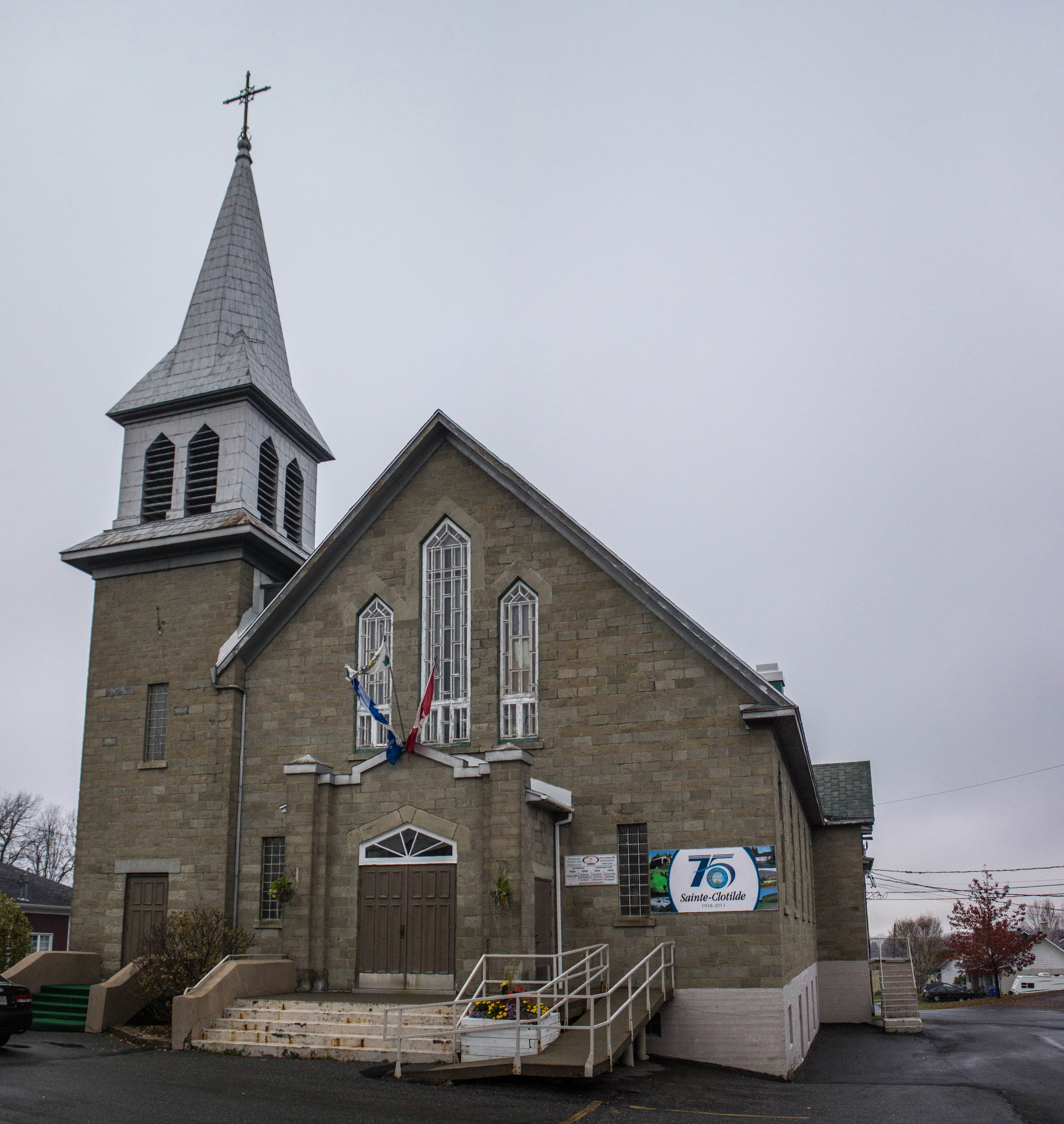
- Church of Sainte-Clotilde-de-Beauce

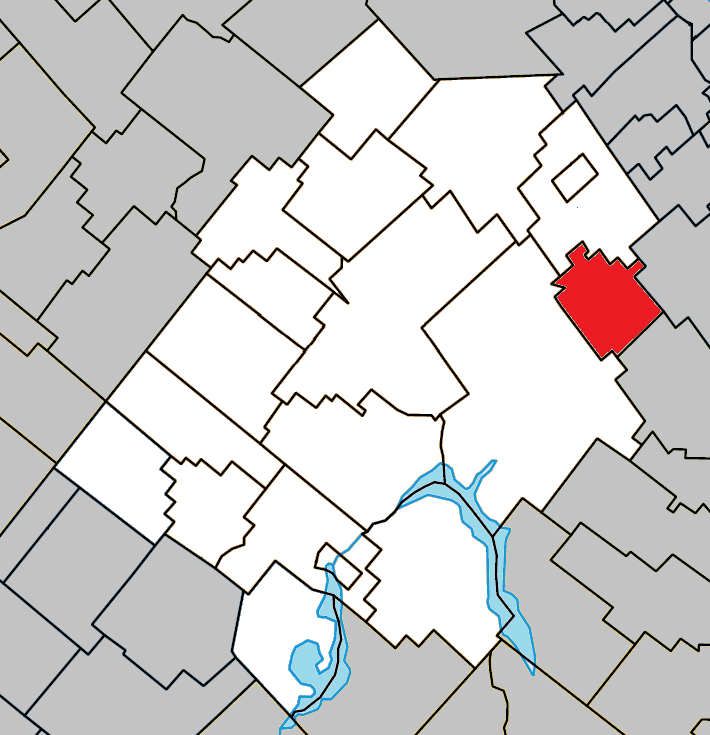
- Location within Les Appalaches RCM

- Location in province of Quebec
- Coordinates: 46°08′00″N 71°02′00″W
- Country: Canada
- Province: Quebec
- Region: Chaudière-Appalaches
- RCM: Les Appalaches
- Constituted: November 19, 1938

Government
  - Mayor: Gérald Grenier
  - Federal riding: Mégantic—L'Érable—Lotbinière
  - Prov. riding: Beauce-Sud

Area
  - Total: 60.80 km^{2} (23.48 sq mi)
  - Land: 60.55 km^{2} (23.38 sq mi)

Population (2021)
  - Total: 569
  - Density: 9.4/km^{2} (24/sq mi)
  - Pop 2016-2021: ▲3.6%
  - Dwellings: 261
- Time zone: UTC−5 (EST)
  - Summer (DST): UTC−4 (EDT)
- Postal code(s): G0N 1C0
- Area codes: 418 and 581
- Highways: R-271
- Website: www.ste-clotilde.com

Sainte-Clotilde-de-Beauce (French pronunciation: [sɛ̃t klɔtildə də bos]) is a municipality located in the Municipalité régionale de comté des Appalaches in Quebec, Canada. It is part of the Chaudière-Appalaches region and the population is 569 as of 2021. It was named after Clotilde, Frankish queen and wife of Clovis I. "Beauce" refers to the municipality's former census division and helps to its differentiation with other Quebec municipalities named "Sainte-Clotilde."

== History ==
Settlement of the territory began around 1869, with people from Sainte-Marie-de-la-Nouvelle-Beauce settling in the 9th range of Tring. They formed a group under the name of Petit-Sainte-Marie and requested the creation of a church in 1890. It wasn't until 1922 that a parish service was established, while most of the first pioneers of Sainte-Clotilde-de-Beauce had been living in the territory of the future municipality since 1920. The parish service gave way to an actual municipality in 1938 when sectors of Saint-Éphrem-de-Tring, Saint-Victor-de-Tring, Sacré-Coeur-de-Jésus and Sacré-Coeur-de-Marie were split and merged to create Sainte-Clothilde-de-Beauce.

In the middle of the 20th century, the name simply became Sainte-Clothilde while the village was informally known as Corriveau until the 1950s. In 1984, the name of Sainte-Clothilde was replaced to the current Sainte-Clotilde-de-Beauce and the status was changed from a parish municipality to a regular municipality.

== Geography ==
The Prévost-Gilbert River flows through the municipality from north-west to south-east; it is fed by several streams, including Rivière Noire Stream.

== Demographics ==
=== Statistics ===
Canada census – Sainte-Clotilde-de-Beauce community profile

	2021	2016
Population	569 (+3.6% from 2016)	549 (-15.5%% from 2011)
Land area	60.55 km^{2} (23.38 sq mi)	60.42 km^{2} (23.33 sq mi)
Population density	9.4/km^{2} (24/sq mi)	9.1/km^{2} (24/sq mi)
Median age	45.6 (M: 46.4, F: 44.8)	45.5 (M: 46.8, F: 45.0)
Private dwellings	261 (total) 233 (occupied)	278 (total)
Median household income	$75,000	$52,032

References: 2021 2016

Population trend:

- Population in 2021: 569 (2011 to 2016 population change: 3.6%)
- Population in 2016: 549 (2011 to 2016 population change: -15.5%)
- Population in 2011: 650
- Population in 2006: 601
- Population in 2001: 577
- Population in 1996: 583
- Population in 1991: 579
- Population in 1986: 559
- Population in 1981: 545
- Population in 1976: 491
- Population in 1971: 492
- Population in 1966: 574
- Population in 1961: 708
- Population in 1956: 789
- Population in 1951: 772
- Population in 1941: 790

Private dwellings occupied by usual residents: 233 (total dwellings: 261)
