= Sainte-Praxède =

- Parish municipality
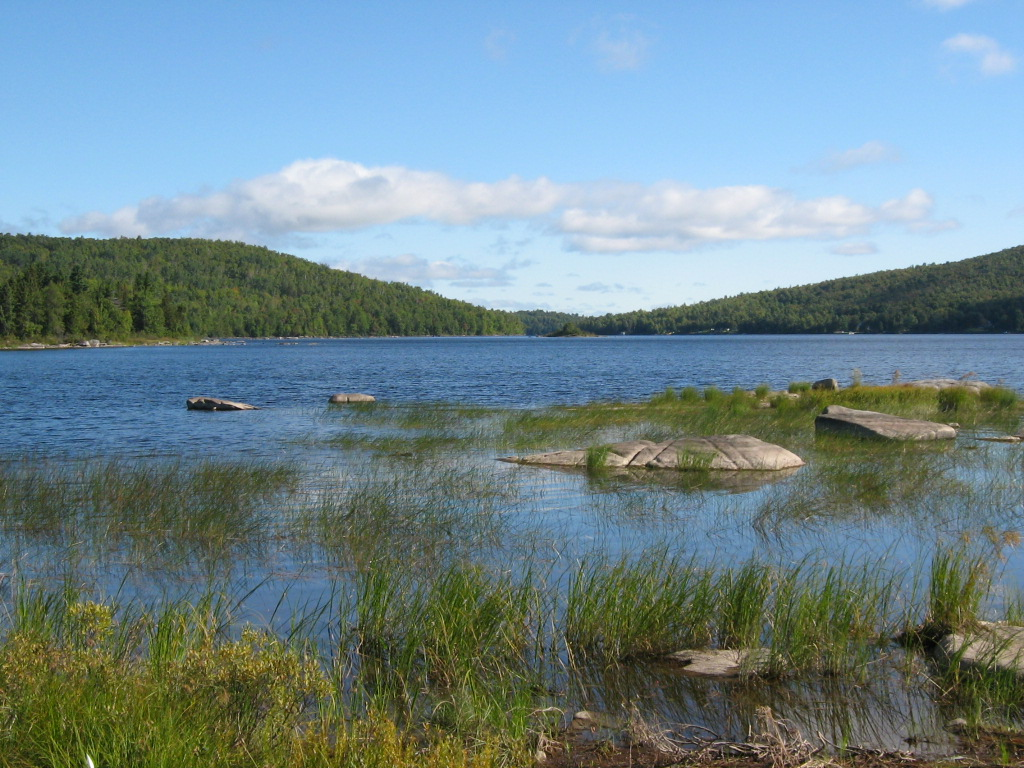

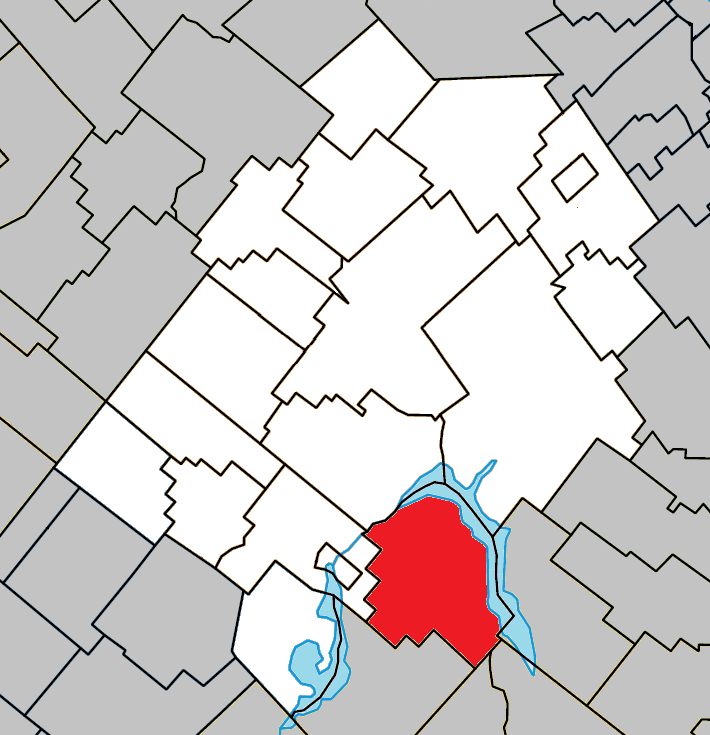
- Location within Les Appalaches RCM.

- Location in southern Quebec.
- Coordinates: 45°54′N 71°15′W
- Country: Canada
- Province: Quebec
- Region: Chaudière-Appalaches
- RCM: Les Appalaches
- Constituted: January 1, 1944

Government
  - Mayor: Jean-François Roy
  - Federal riding: Mégantic—L'Érable—Lotbinière
  - Prov. riding: Mégantic

Area
  - Total: 155.00 km^{2} (59.85 sq mi)
  - Land: 136.18 km^{2} (52.58 sq mi)

Population (2021)
  - Total: 351
  - Density: 2.6/km^{2} (6.7/sq mi)
  - Pop 2016-2021: ▲7.3%
  - Dwellings: 290
- Time zone: UTC−5 (EST)
  - Summer (DST): UTC−4 (EDT)
- Postal code(s): G0N 1E1
- Area codes: 418 and 581
- Highways: R-263
- Website: www.ste-praxede.ca

Sainte-Praxède (French pronunciation: [sɛ̃t pʁaksɛd]) is a parish municipality located in Les Appalaches Regional County Municipality in the Chaudière-Appalaches region of Quebec, Canada. Its population was 351 as of the Canada 2021 Census. It was named after Catholic saint Praxedes.

== Demographics ==
In the 2021 Census of Population conducted by Statistics Canada, Sainte-Praxède had a population of 351 living in 157 of its 290 total private dwellings, a change of 7.3% from its 2016 population of 327. With a land area of 136.18 km^{2} (52.58 sq mi), it had a population density of 2.6/km^{2} (6.7/sq mi) in 2021.

=== Population ===
Population trend:

Census	Population	Change (%)
2021	351	▲7.3%
2016	327	▼9.9%
2011	363	▼14.6%
2006	425	▲27.2%
2001	334	▼5.6%
1996	354	▲2.6%
1991	345	▼8.5%
1986	377	▼0.8%
1981	380	▲9.2%
1976	348	▼9.1%
1971	383	▼13.5%
1966	443	▲114.0%
1961	207	▼13.8%
1956	240	▼23.1%
1951	312	N/A
