= Saint-Jean-de-Brébeuf, Quebec =

Saint-Jean-de-Brébeuf
- Municipality
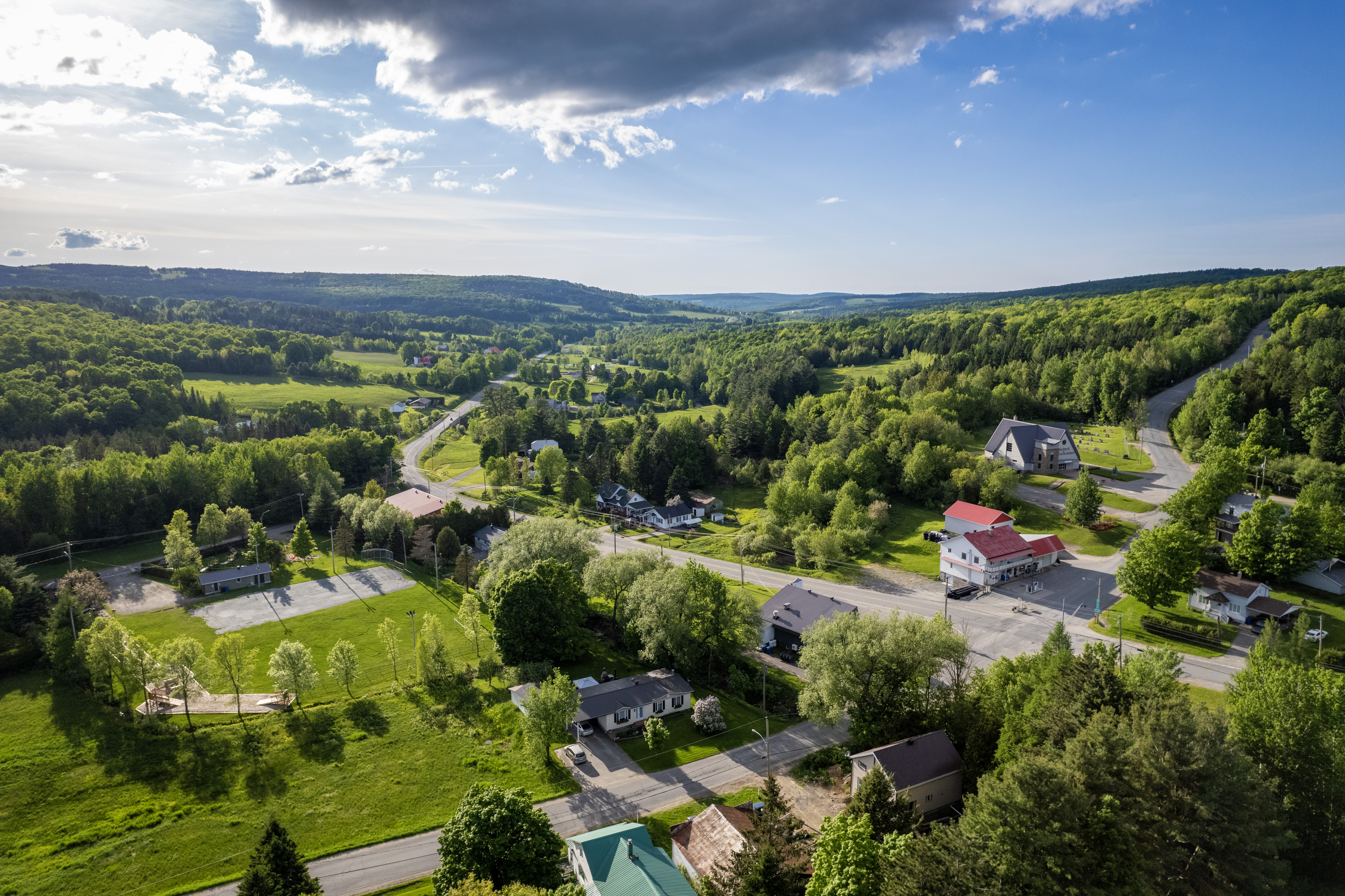
- Aerial view of Saint-Jean-de-Brébeuf

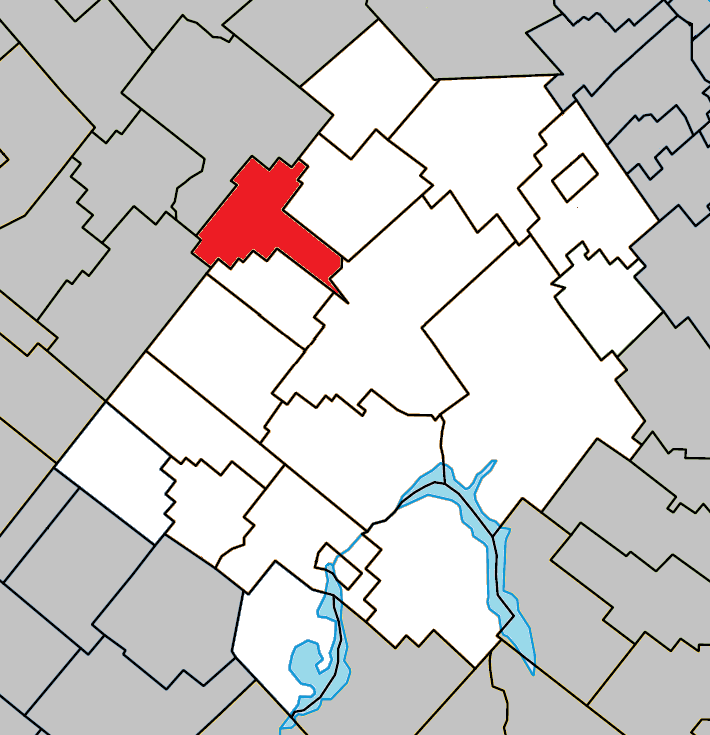
- Location within Les Appalaches RCM.

- Location in province of Quebec.
- Coordinates: 46°11′N 71°28′W
- Country: Canada
- Province: Quebec
- Region: Chaudière-Appalaches
- RCM: Les Appalaches
- Constituted: January 1, 1946

Government
  - Mayor: Ginette Côté
  - Federal riding: Mégantic—L'Érable—Lotbinière
  - Prov. riding: Lotbinière-Frontenac

Area
  - Total: 79.50 km^{2} (30.70 sq mi)
  - Land: 79.15 km^{2} (30.56 sq mi)

Population (2021)
  - Total: 351
  - Density: 4.4/km^{2} (11/sq mi)
  - Pop 2016-2021: ▼5.6%
  - Dwellings: 171
- Time zone: UTC−5 (EST)
  - Summer (DST): UTC−4 (EDT)
- Postal code(s): G6G 0A1
- Area codes: 418 and 581
- Highways: R-216; R-267
- Website: www.st-jean-de-brebeuf.ca

Saint-Jean-de-Brébeuf (French pronunciation: [sɛ̃ ʒɑ̃ də bʁebœf]) is a municipality in the Municipalité régionale de comté des Appalaches in Quebec, Canada. It is part of the Chaudière-Appalaches region and the population is 351 as of 2019.

First named Lower Ireland due to its location in the township of Ireland and in opposition to Upper Ireland, now the hamlet of Maple Grove in Irlande, Saint-Jean-de-Brébeuf was first colonized by English, Irish and Scottish settlers. The current name was given to the municipality at its constitution in 1946. It honours Jean de Brébeuf, a French Jesuit missionary martyred in Sainte-Marie among the Hurons, near Midland, Ontario, in 1649.

The former parish church was converted in 2014 to house Le Théâtre Bleu performance venue.

== Sources ==
- Commission de toponymie du Québec
- Ministère des Affaires municipales, des Régions et de l'Occupation du territoire
