= East Broughton =

- Municipality
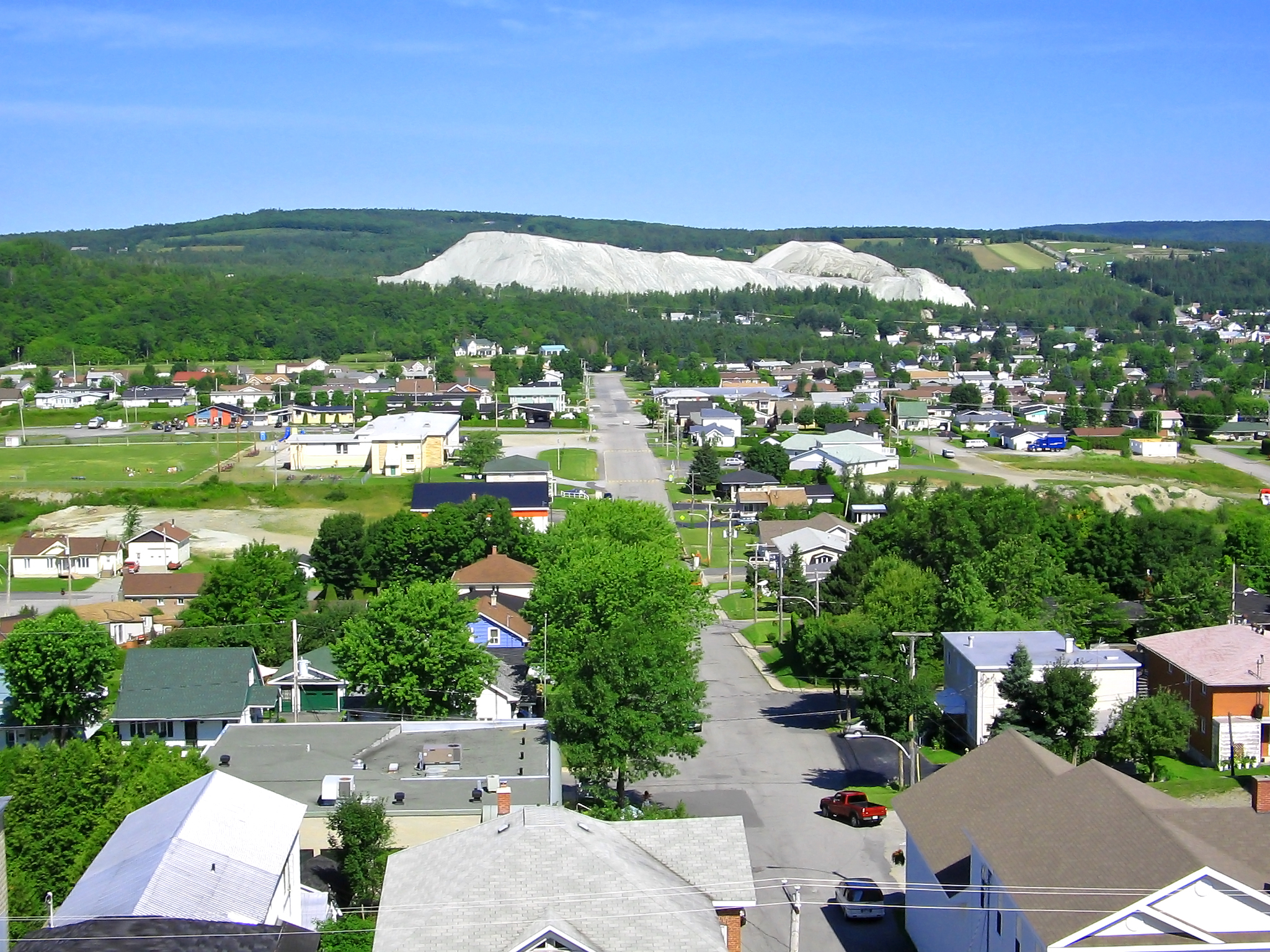
- Aerial view of East Broughton

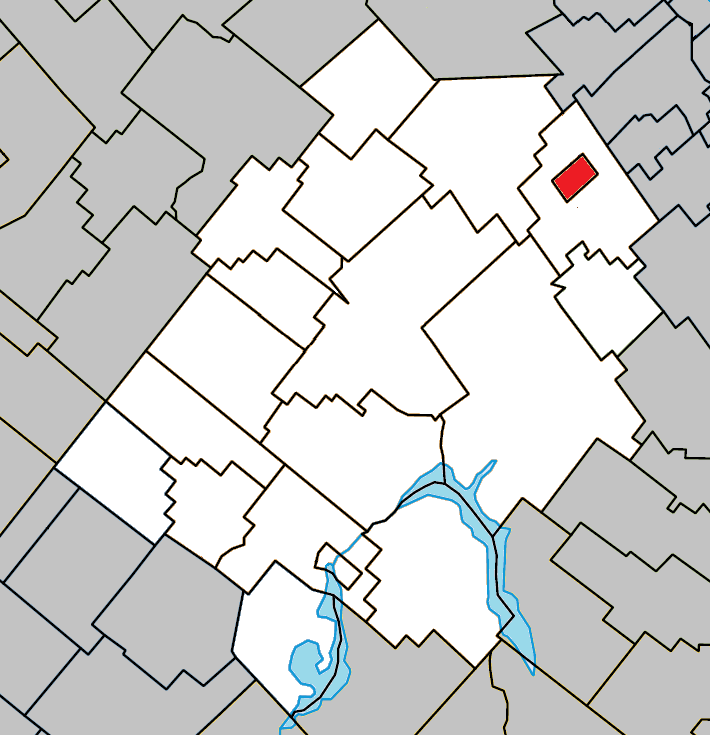
- Location within Les Appalaches RCM

- Location in province of Quebec
- Coordinates: 46°13′N 71°04′W
- Country: Canada
- Province: Quebec
- Region: Chaudière-Appalaches
- RCM: Les Appalaches
- Settled: 1820s
- Constituted: January 5, 1994

Government
  - Mayor: Jean-Benoit Létourneau
  - Federal riding: Mégantic—L'Érable—Lotbinière
  - Prov. riding: Lotbinière-Frontenac

Area
  - Municipality: 8.7 km^{2} (3.4 sq mi)
  - Land: 8.86 km^{2} (3.42 sq mi)
- There is an apparent discrepancy between 2 authoritative sources.

Population (2021)
  - Municipality: 2,248
  - Density: 253.9/km^{2} (658/sq mi)
  - Urban: 1,866
  - Pop (2016-21): ▲2.2%
  - Dwellings: 1,059
- Time zone: UTC−5 (EST)
  - Summer (DST): UTC−4 (EDT)
- Postal code(s): G0N 1H0
- Area codes: 418 and 581
- Highways: R-112
- Website: www.municipaliteeastbroughton.com

East Broughton is a municipality located in Les Appalaches Regional County Municipality in the Chaudière-Appalaches region of Quebec, Canada. Its population was 2,248 as of 2021. It was named following its location in the geographic township of Broughton, as compared to West Broughton, known today as Saint-Pierre-de-Broughton.

East Broughton forms an enclave in the north end of the territory of Sacré-Cœur-de-Jésus.

== History ==
The geographic township of Broughton was first identified on the Gale and Duberger map of 1795. It may have been named after a place in Lancashire, England, or (less likely) after William Robert Broughton (1762–1821).

Development began in 1820 with English settlers, and by the mid 19th century, a mission was founded. In 1871, the Parish of Sacré-Cœur-de-Jésus was founded. The village itself was commonly called East Broughton, in reference to its location within the geographic township. In 1875, the East Broughton post office opened.

In 1881, the Quebec Central Railway was completed, resulting in the development of two village cores: one centered on the church called Village of L'Église, the other at the train station and called Village de La Station or just Le Village, where a separate post office opened in 1899.

in 1896, asbestos industry began in the area, employing practically the entire local workforce, either in the mining, processing, or shipping of asbestos, until the late 1950s.

The place was first officially incorporated in 1902 as part of the Parish Municipality of Sacré-Cœur-de-Jésus. On October 27, 1908, the village separated from the parish municipality and was incorporated as the Village Municipality of Sacré-Cœur-de-Jésus, which changed statutes and name in 1931 to become the Municipality of East Broughton. On January 1, 1955, the village part around the station split off to become the separate Village Municipality of East Broughton Station.

In 1994, East Broughton Station was amalgamated back into the Municipality of East Broughton.

== Demographics ==
Historical census populations – East Broughton

Year	Pop.	±%
1911	996	—
1921	1,709	+71.6%
1931	1,868	+9.3%
1941	1,684	−9.9%
1951	1,690	+0.4%
1956	919	−45.6%
1961	1,099	+19.6%

Year	Pop.	±%
1966	1,250	+13.7%
1971	1,388	+11.0%
1976	1,371	−1.2%
1981	1,385	+1.0%
1986	1,354	−2.2%
1991	1,278	−5.6%
1996	2,489	+94.8%

Year	Pop.	±%
2001	2,367	−4.9%
2006	2,351	−0.7%
2011	2,229	−5.2%
2016	2,199	−1.3%
2021	2,248	+2.2%

Population counts are not adjusted for boundary changes.
Source: Statistics Canada

== Government ==
List of former mayors:

- Paul Grenier (...–2009)
- Kaven Mathieu (2009–2018)
- François Baril (2018–2021)
- Jean-Benoit Létourneau (2021–present)
