= Whetstone River =

River in South Dakota, United States

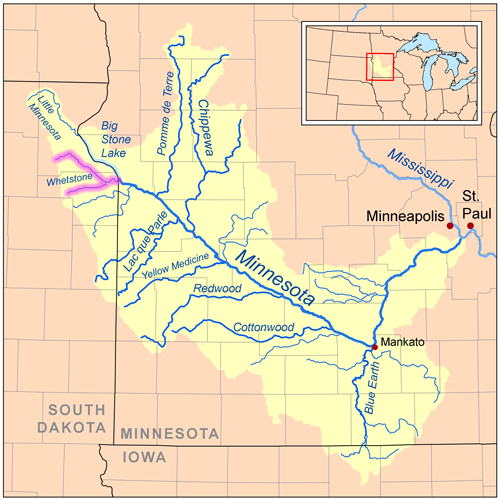
- Map of the Minnesota River watershed with the Whetstone River highlighted (including the North and South forks)

Location
- Country: United States
- State: Minnesota

Physical characteristics
- Source: confluence of its North and South forks
  - location: northeast of Milbank, South Dakota
- Mouth: Minnesota River
  - location: Ortonville, Minnesota
  - coordinates: 45.2972°N 96.4500°W
- Length: 12.7 km (7.9 mi)

Basin features
- Tributaries
  - left: (upstream)
  - right: (upstream)

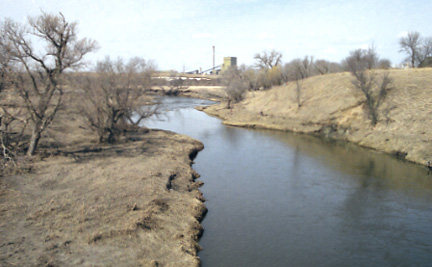
The Whetstone River near Big Stone City in Grant County, South Dakota

The Whetstone River is a 12.7-mile-long (20.4 km) tributary of the Minnesota River, in northeastern South Dakota and a very small portion of western Minnesota in the United States. Via the Minnesota River, it is part of the watershed of the Mississippi River.

== Course ==
The Whetstone is formed by the confluence of its North and South forks 4 miles (6 km) northeast of Milbank, South Dakota and flows generally eastward across the Coteau des Prairies in northern Grant County, past Big Stone City. It enters the Minnesota River at Ortonville, Minnesota, about 0.25 mi (0.40 km) after crossing the state line and just downstream of the Minnesota's emergence from Big Stone Lake.

At Big Stone City, the river has a mean annual discharge of 69 cubic feet per second.

Upstream of Big Stone City, the river collects two tributaries, the North Fork Whetstone River and the South Fork Whetstone River, each of which rises on the Coteau. The North Fork flows southeastward from Roberts County and passes near the town of Wilmot. The South Fork flows westward in Grant County and passes the town of Milbank.

== See also ==
- List of rivers of Minnesota
- List of rivers of South Dakota
