= Sacré-Coeur-de-Jésus =

Sacré-Cœur-de-Jésus
- Parish municipality
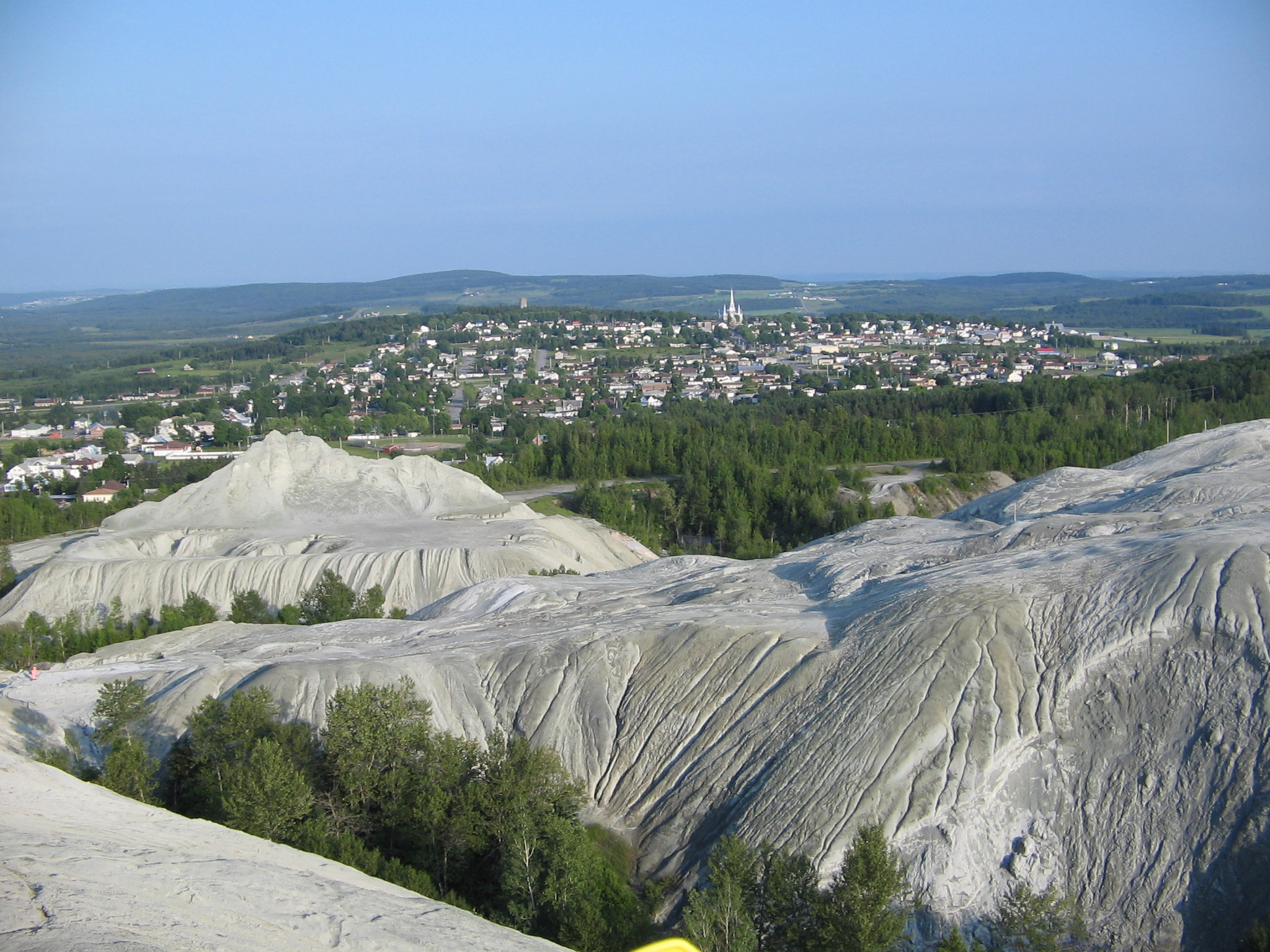
- Town of East Broughton is an enclave inside Sacré-Cœur-de-Jésus, surrounded only by the latter.

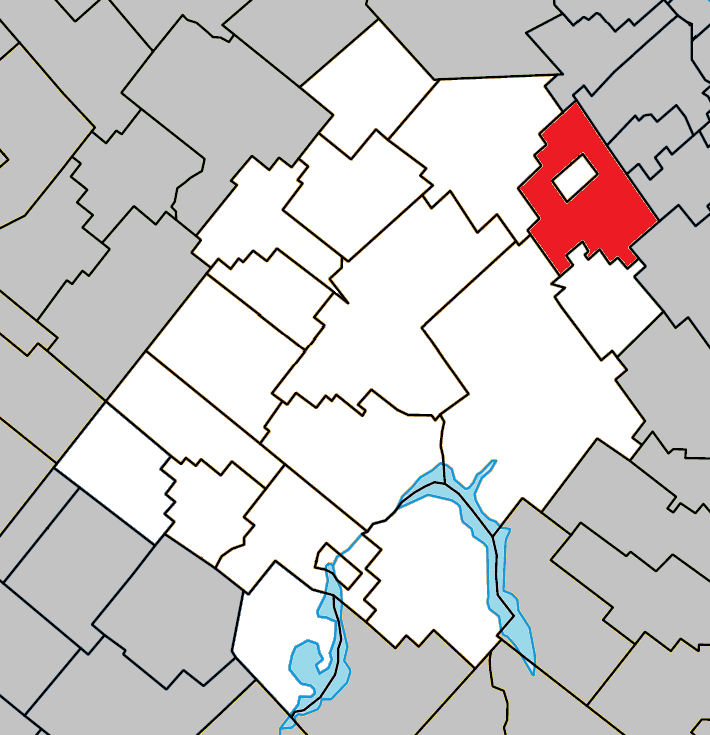
- Location within Les Appalaches RCM

- Location in southern Quebec
- Coordinates: 46°13′N 71°05′W
- Country: Canada
- Province: Quebec
- Region: Chaudière-Appalaches
- RCM: Les Appalaches
- Settled: 1820
- Constituted: December 5, 1902

Government
  - Mayor: François Paré
  - Federal riding: Mégantic—L'Érable—Lotbinière
  - Prov. riding: Lotbinière-Frontenac

Area
  - Total: 105 km^{2} (41 sq mi)
  - Land: 104.73 km^{2} (40.44 sq mi)

Population (2021)
  - Total: 536
  - Density: 5.1/km^{2} (13/sq mi)
  - Pop (2016-21): ▲2.9%
  - Dwellings: 277
- Time zone: UTC−5 (EST)
  - Summer (DST): UTC−4 (EDT)
- Postal code(s): G0N 1G0
- Area codes: 418 and 581
- Highways: R-112 R-271
- Website: www.sacrecoeurdejesus.qc.ca

Sacré-Cœur-de-Jésus (French pronunciation: [sakʁe kœʁ də ʒezy]) is a parish municipality located in Les Appalaches Regional County Municipality in the Chaudière-Appalaches region of Quebec, Canada. Its population was 536 as of the 2021 Canadian census.

The municipality of East Broughton forms an enclave in the territory of Sacré-Cœur-de-Jésus.

== History ==
English settlers arrived in 1820. In 1871, the Parish of Sacré-Cœur-de-Jésus was founded. In 1881, the Quebec Central Railway was completed, resulting in increased development of the area.

Although a municipal organization was set up in 1889 and its first mayor elected in 1890, it wasn't until 1902 that the Parish Municipality of Sacré-Cœur-de-Jésus was officially approved.

Over time, several other municipalities split off from Sacré-Cœur-de-Jésus: East Broughton in 1908, Sainte-Clotilde-de-Beauce in 1938, and East Broughton Station in 1954.

== Demographics ==
=== Population ===
In the 2021 Census of Population conducted by Statistics Canada, Sacré-Coeur-de-Jésus had a population of 536 living in 223 of its 277 total private dwellings, a change of 2.9% from its 2016 population of 521. With a land area of 104.73 km^{2} (40.44 sq mi), it had a population density of 5.1/km^{2} (13.3/sq mi) in 2021.

Canada census – Sacré-Coeur-de-Jésus, Quebec community profile

	2021	2016
Population	536 (+2.9% from 2016)	521 (-7.6% from 2011)
Land area	104.73 km^{2} (40.44 sq mi)	104.64 km^{2} (40.40 sq mi)
Population density	5.1/km^{2} (13/sq mi)	5.0/km^{2} (13/sq mi)
Median age	42.8 (M: 41.6, F: 45.6)	43.6 (M: 41.9, F: 46.1)
Private dwellings	277 (total)	267 (total)
Median household income	$64,500	$51,072

References: 2021 2016

Historical census populations – Sacré-Coeur-de-Jésus

Year	Pop.	±%
1881	1,241	—
1891	1,586	+27.8%
1901	1,946	+22.7%
1911	1,720	−11.6%
1921	1,602	−6.9%
1931	1,673	+4.4%
1941	1,401	−16.3%
1951	1,331	−5.0%

Year	Pop.	±%
1956	1,217	−8.6%
1961	1,137	−6.6%
1966	951	−16.4%
1971	843	−11.4%
1976	693	−17.8%
1981	672	−3.0%
1986	604	−10.1%
1991	571	−5.5%

Year	Pop.	±%
1996	604	+5.8%
2001	559	−7.5%
2006	599	+7.2%
2011	564	−5.8%
2016	521	−7.6%
2021	536	+2.9%

Population counts are not adjusted for boundary changes.
Source: Statistics Canada

=== Language ===
Canada Census Mother Tongue - Sacré-Coeur-de-Jésus, Quebec
Census	Total	French			English			French & English			Other		
Year	Responses	Count	Trend	Pop %	Count	Trend	Pop %	Count	Trend	Pop %	Count	Trend	Pop %
2021	540	530	▲2.9%	98.1%	5	0.0%	0.9%	0	0.0%	0.0%	0	▼100.0%	0.0%
2016	520	515	▼8.0%	99.0%	5	▲ n/a%	1.0%	0	0.0%	0.0%	5	0.0%	1.0%
2011	565	560	▼1.8%	99.1%	0	0.0%	2.8%	0	0.0%	0.0%	5	▼50.0%	0.9%
2006	590	570	▲4.6%	96.6%	0	0.0%	2.6%	0	▼100.0%	0.0%	10	▲ n/a%	1.7%
2001	550	545	▼5.2%	99.1%	0	0.0%	0.0%	10	▲ n/a%	1.8%	0	0.0%	0.0%
1996	575	575	n/a	100.0%	0	n/a	0.0%	0	n/a	0.0%	0	n/a	0.0%
