= Kinnear's Mills =

- Municipality
- Municipalité de Kinnear's Mills
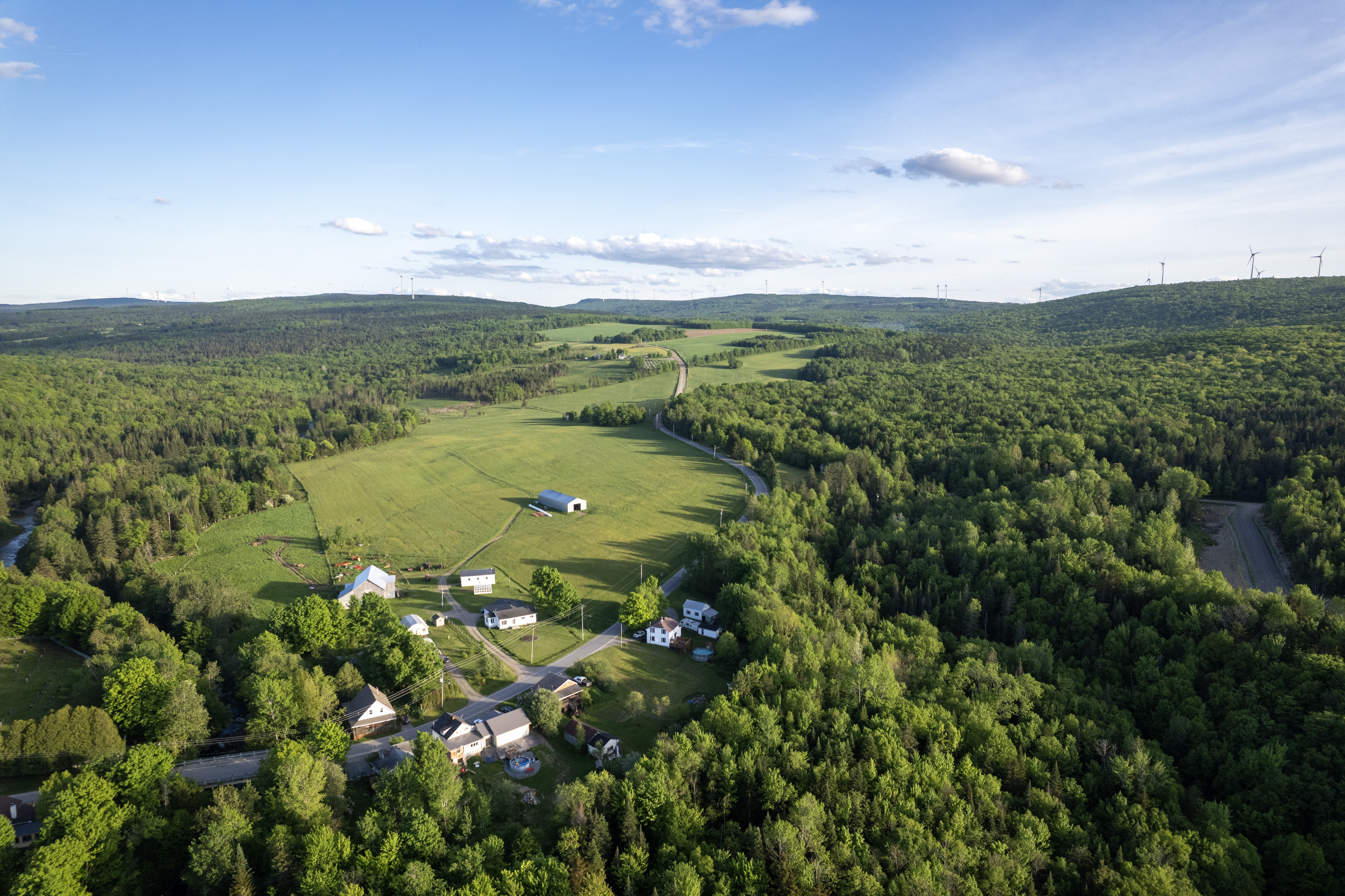
- Aerial view of Kinnear's Mills

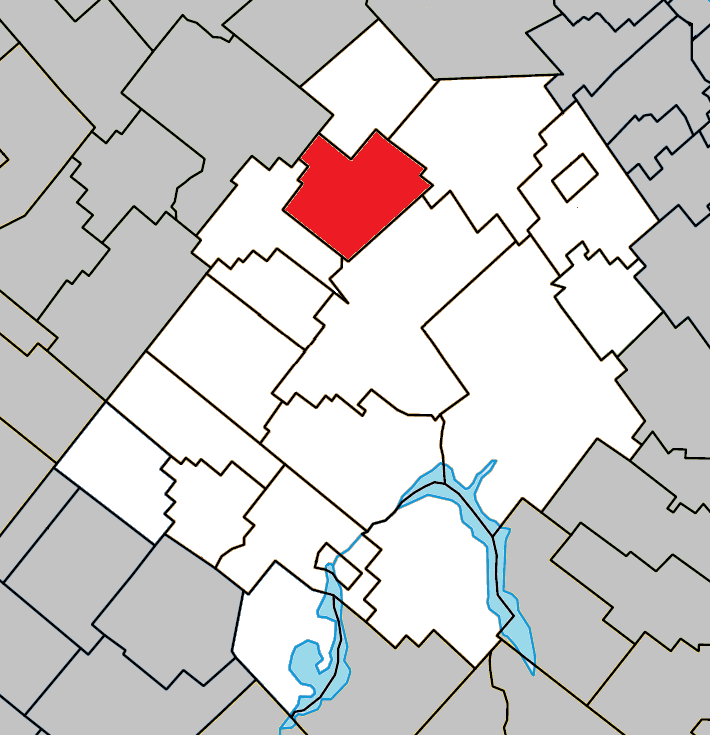
- Location within Les Appalaches RCM

- Location in province of Quebec
- Coordinates: 46°13′N 71°23′W
- Country: Canada
- Province: Quebec
- Region: Chaudière-Appalaches
- RCM: Les Appalaches
- Constituted: July 1, 1855

Government
  - Mayor: Carl Dubois
  - Federal riding: Mégantic—L'Érable—Lotbinière
  - Prov. riding: Lotbinière-Frontenac

Area
  - Total: 93.10 km^{2} (35.95 sq mi)
  - Land: 93.66 km^{2} (36.16 sq mi)
- There is an apparent contradiction between two authoritative sources

Population (2021)
  - Total: 397
  - Density: 4.2/km^{2} (11/sq mi)
  - Pop 2016-2021: ▲13.4%
  - Dwellings: 194
- Time zone: UTC−5 (EST)
  - Summer (DST): UTC−4 (EDT)
- Postal code(s): G0N 1K0
- Area codes: 418 and 581
- Highways: R-216; R-269
- Website: www.kinnearsmills.com

Kinnear's Mills is a municipality located in the Les Appalaches Regional County Municipality in the Chaudière-Appalaches region of Quebec, Canada. Its population was 397 as of the Canada 2021 Census. It is known as the "Village of Churches," as four churches (Anglican, Catholic, Methodist, and United) are located close to each other in the village centre.

James G. Kinnear (1924-2010) published a book, "Kinnear's Mills," documenting the creation of the village and the family of James Kinnear, after whom the municipality is named.

== Gallery ==
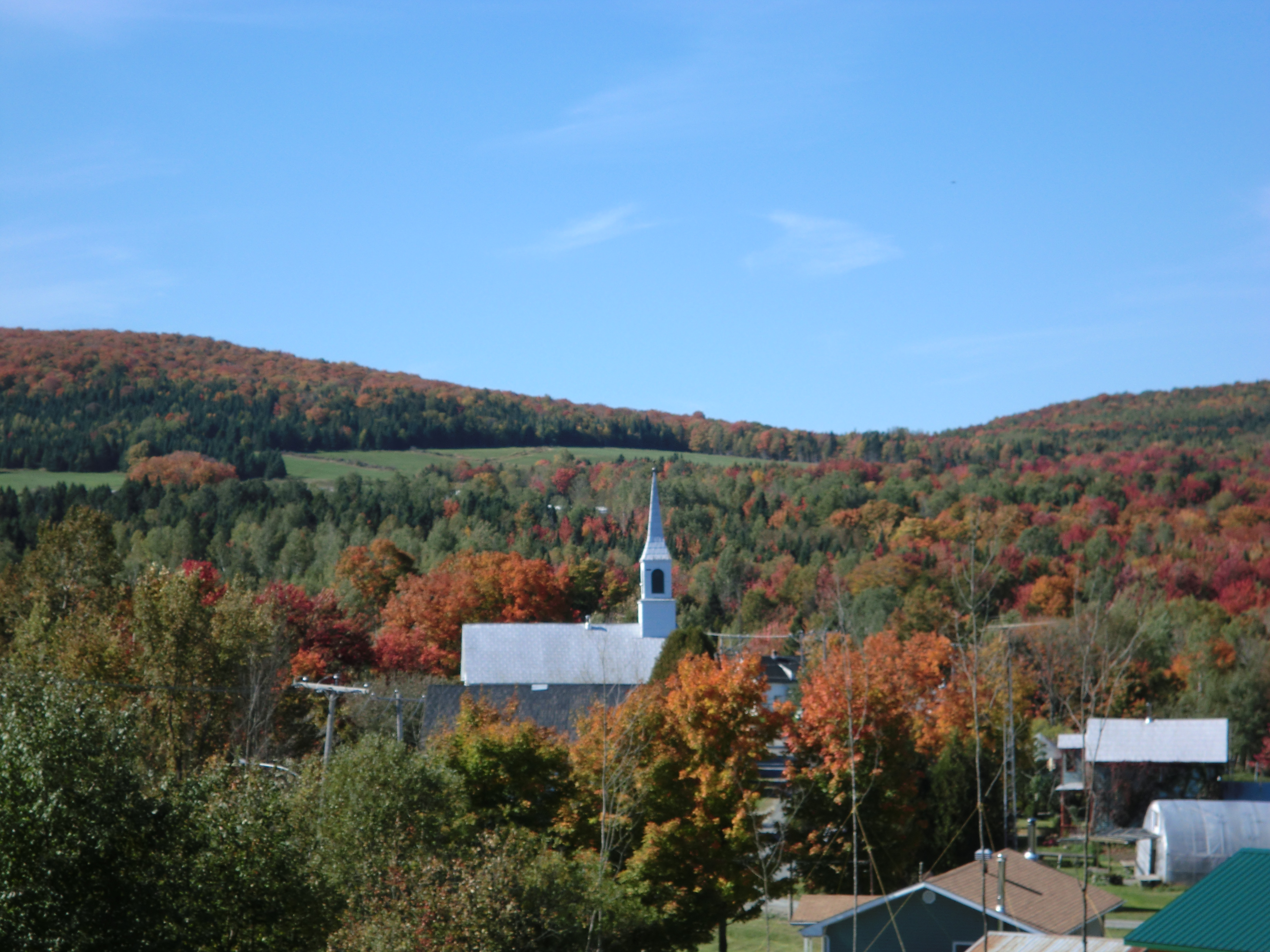

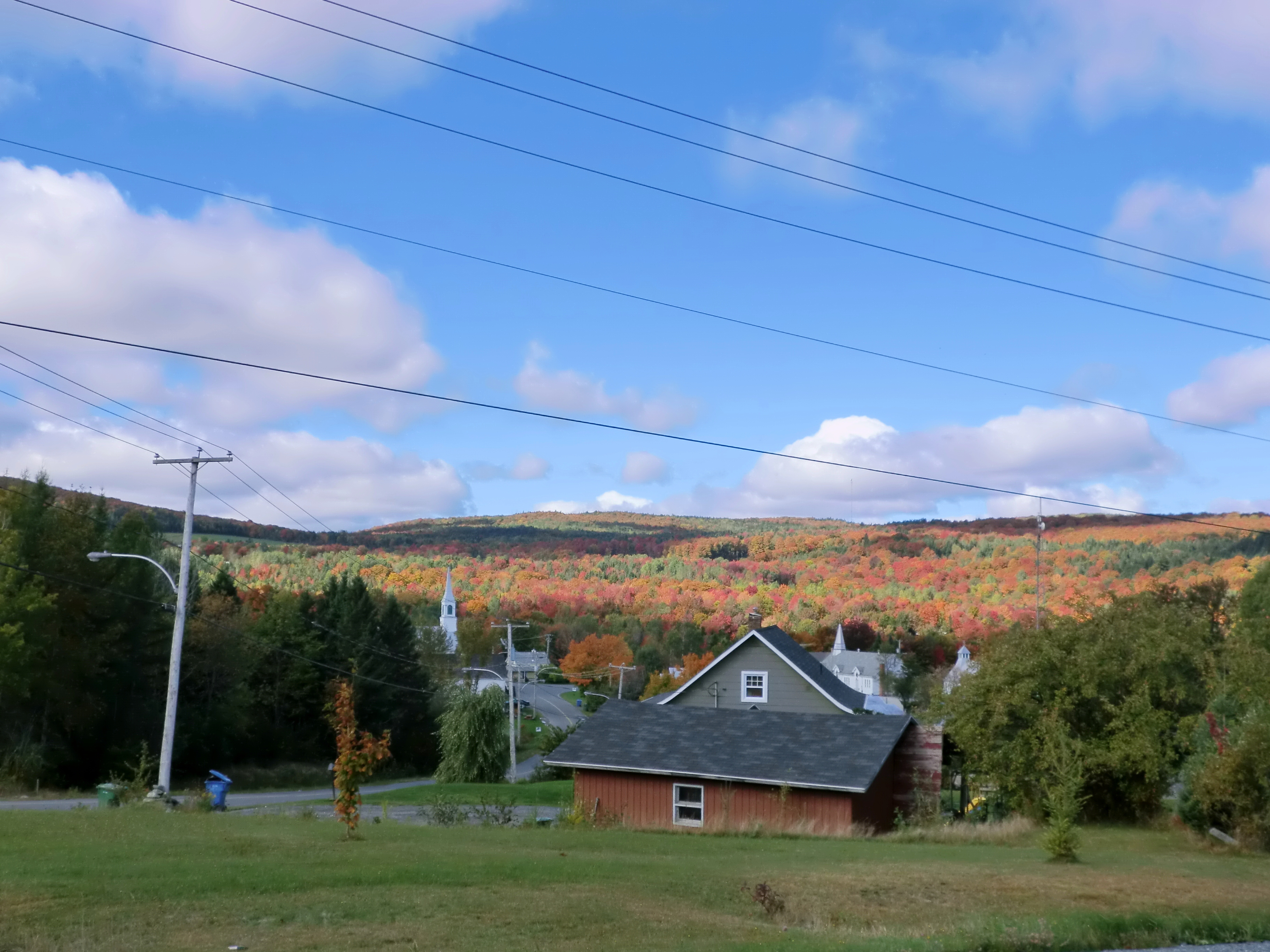

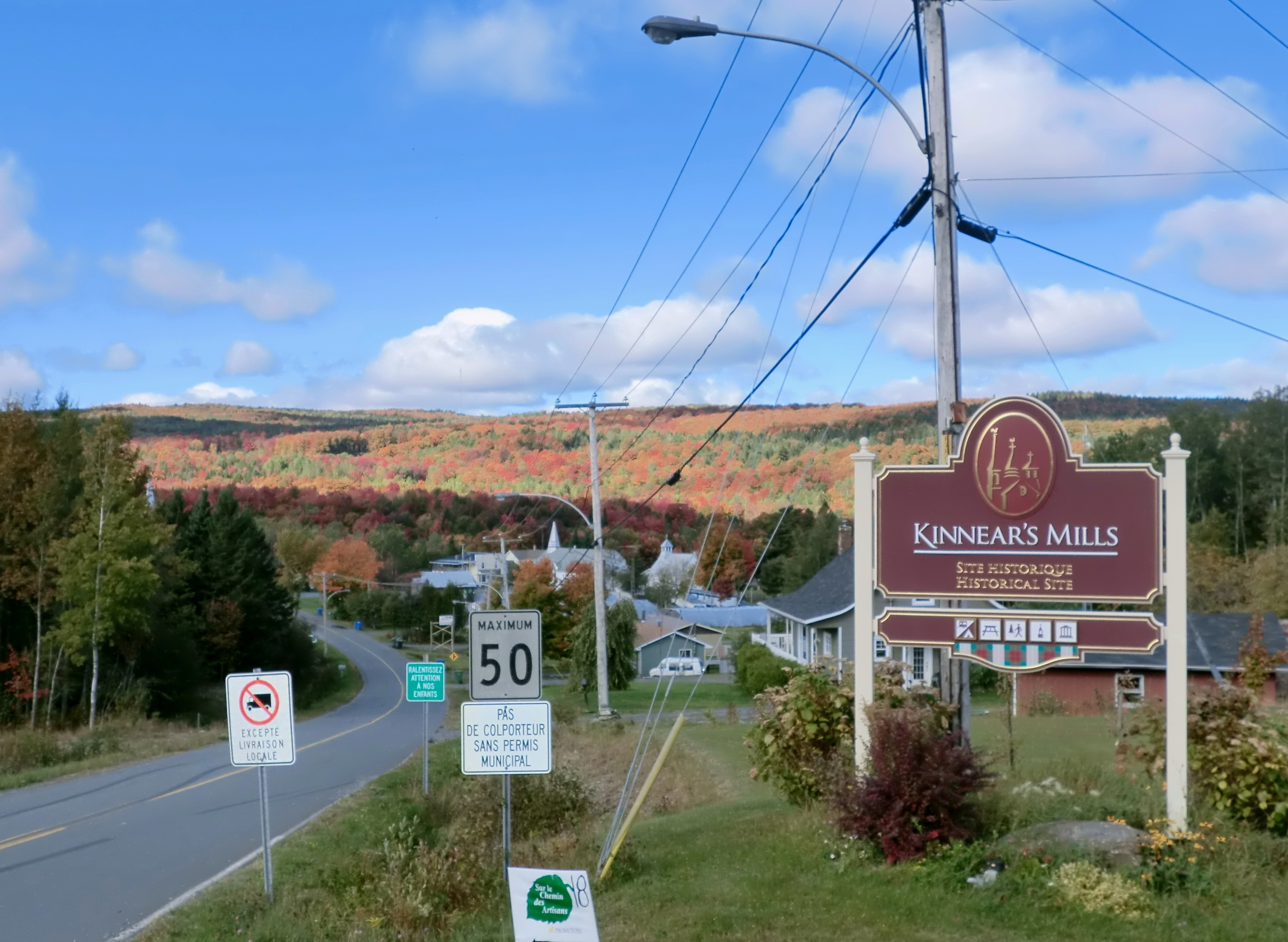

== See also ==
- List of anglophone communities in Quebec
