= Saint-Jacques-de-Leeds =

- Municipality
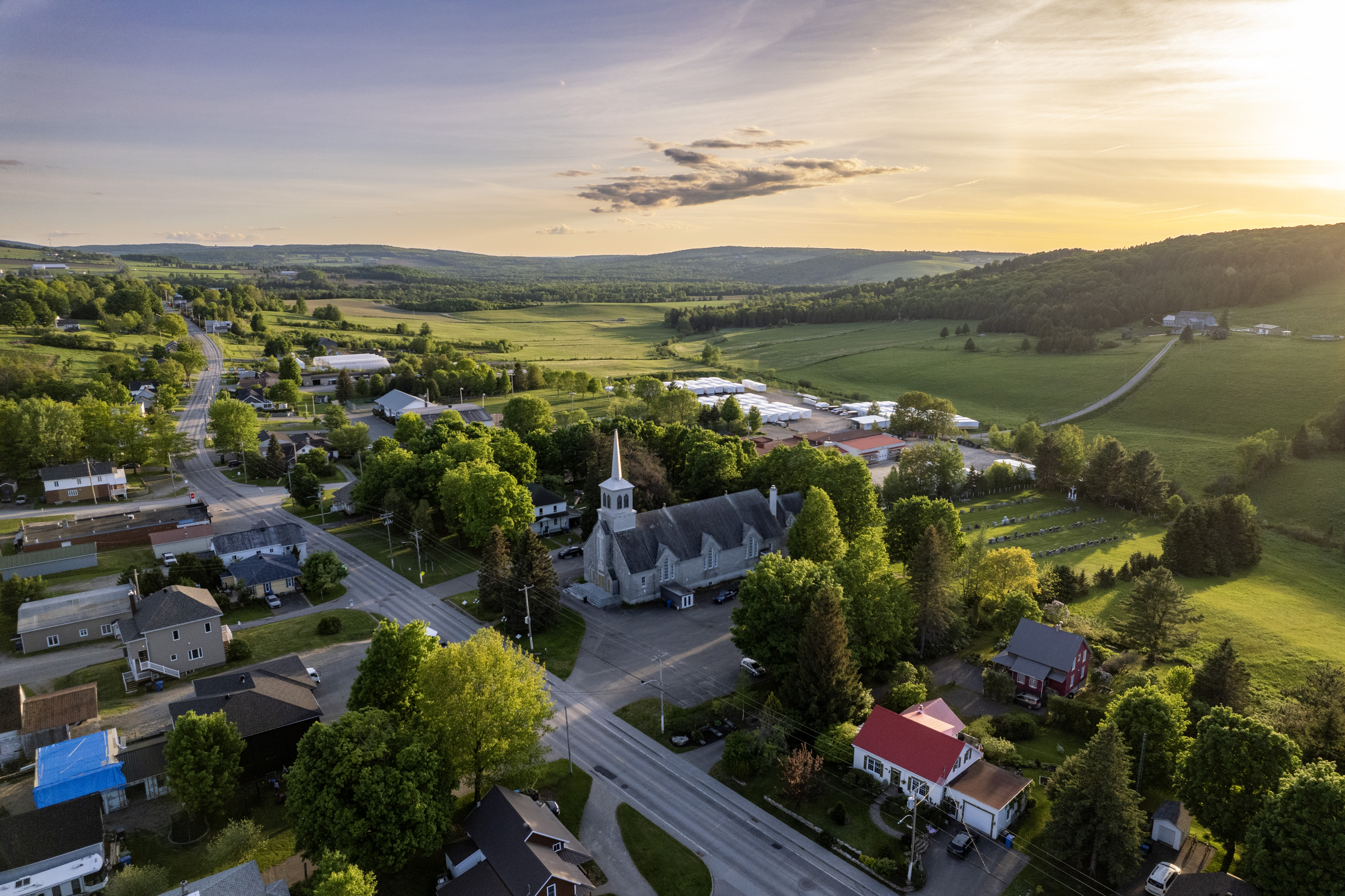
- Aerial view of Saint-Jacques-de-Leeds

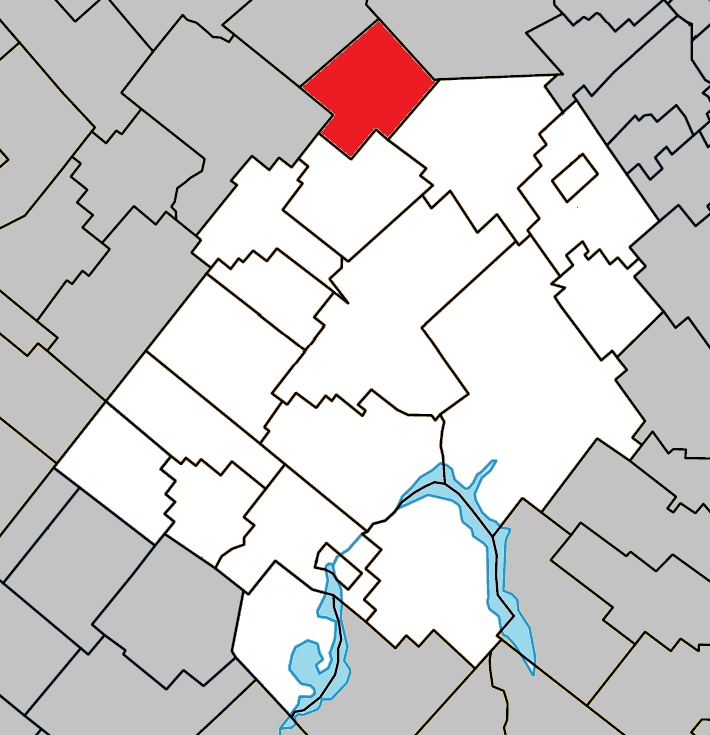
- Location within Les Appalaches RCM

- Location in province of Quebec
- Coordinates: 46°17′N 71°21′W
- Country: Canada
- Province: Quebec
- Region: Chaudière-Appalaches
- RCM: Les Appalaches
- Constituted: September 23, 1929

Government
  - Mayor: Valérie Fournier
  - Federal riding: Mégantic—L'Érable—Lotbinière
  - Prov. riding: Lotbinière-Frontenac

Area
  - Total: 83.20 km^{2} (32.12 sq mi)
  - Land: 80.56 km^{2} (31.10 sq mi)

Population (2021)
  - Total: 711
  - Density: 8.8/km^{2} (23/sq mi)
  - Pop 2016-2021: ▲3.8%
  - Dwellings: 357
- Time zone: UTC−5 (EST)
  - Summer (DST): UTC−4 (EDT)
- Postal code(s): G0N 1J0
- Area codes: 418 and 581
- Highways: R-216; R-269; R-271
- Website: www.saintjacquesdeleeds.ca

Saint-Jacques-de-Leeds is a municipality located in the Municipalité régionale de comté des Appalaches in Quebec, Canada. It is part of the Chaudière-Appalaches region and the population is 711 as of 2021. It is named after one of Jesus' apostles, James, son of Zebedee, and the city of Leeds, England.

== Sister city ==
- Barmainville, France
