= Saint-Pierre-de-Broughton =

- Municipality

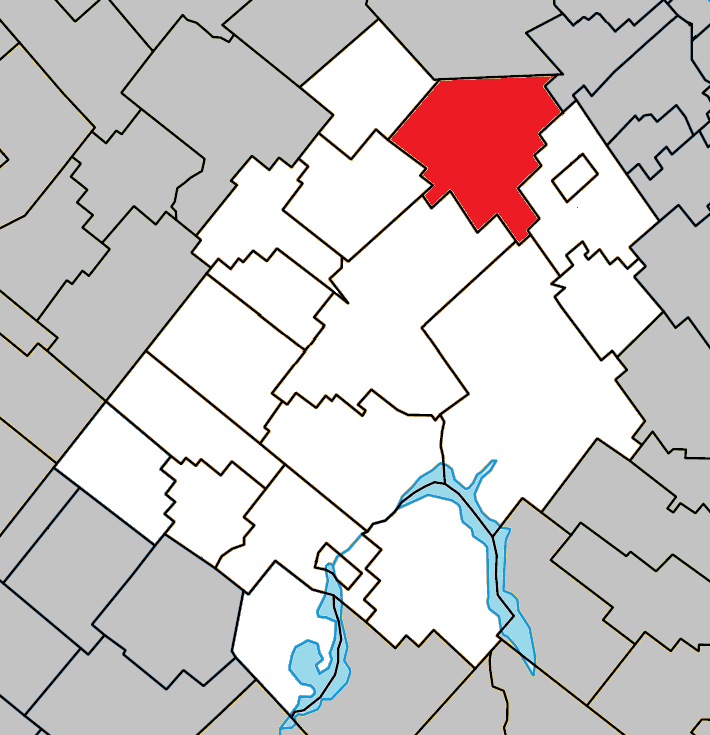
- Location within Les Appalaches RCM

- Location in southern Quebec
- Coordinates: 46°15′N 71°12′W
- Country: Canada
- Province: Quebec
- Region: Chaudière-Appalaches
- RCM: Les Appalaches
- Constituted: October 12, 1974

Government
  - Mayor: Alexandre Dubuc
  - Federal riding: Mégantic—L'Érable—Lotbinière
  - Prov. riding: Lotbinière-Frontenac

Area
  - Total: 148.50 km^{2} (57.34 sq mi)
  - Land: 150.56 km^{2} (58.13 sq mi)
- There is an apparent contradiction between two authoritative sources

Population (2021)
  - Total: 889
  - Density: 5.9/km^{2} (15/sq mi)
  - Pop 2016-2021: ▼1.0%
  - Dwellings: 453
- Time zone: UTC−5 (EST)
  - Summer (DST): UTC−4 (EDT)
- Postal code(s): G0N 1T0
- Area codes: 418 and 581
- Highways: R-112; R-271
- Website: www.ville.st-pierre-de-broughton.qc.ca

Saint-Pierre-de-Broughton is a municipality located in the Municipalité régionale de comté des Appalaches in Quebec, Canada. It is part of the Chaudière-Appalaches region and the population is 889 as of 2019.

== Demographics ==
In the 2021 Census of Population conducted by Statistics Canada, Saint-Pierre-de-Broughton had a population of 889 living in 396 of its 453 total private dwellings, a change of −1% from its 2016 population of 898. With a land area of 150.56 km^{2} (58.13 sq mi), it had a population density of 5.9/km^{2} (15.3/sq mi) in 2021.

Population trend:

Census	Population	Change (%)
2021	889	▼1.0%
2016	898	▲1.8%
2011	882	0.0%
2006	882	▲4.0%
2001	848	▼2.6%
1996	871	▼5.4%
1991	921	▼3.6%
1986	955	▼8.7%
1981	1,046	▼2.1%
1976	1,068	▼8.6%
1971	1,169	▲137.6%
1966	492	▼14.3%
1961	574	▼15.6%
1956	680	▲1.2%
1951	672	▼9.6%
1941	743	▼11.0%
1931	835	▲12.5%
1921	742	▼11.1%
1911	835	▼2.1%
1901	853	▲8.1%
1891	789	▼8.0%
1881	858	N/A
