= Les Appalaches Regional County Municipality =

Les Appalaches
- Regional county municipality
- Coordinates: 46°05′N 71°18′W
- Country: Canada
- Province: Quebec
- Region: Chaudière-Appalaches
- Effective: January 1, 1982
- County seat: Thetford Mines
- Settlements: List: Cities; Disraeli; Thetford Mines; Municipalities; Adstock; Beaulac-Garthby; East Broughton; Irlande; Kinnear's Mills; Saint-Adrien-d'Irlande; Sainte-Clotilde-de-Beauce; Saint-Fortunat; Saint-Jacques-de-Leeds; Saint-Jean-de-Brébeuf; Saint-Joseph-de-Coleraine; Saint-Julien; Saint-Pierre-de-Broughton; Parishes; Disraeli; Sacré-Coeur-de-Jésus; Sainte-Praxède; Saint-Jacques-le-Majeur-de-Wolfestown

Government
  - Type: Prefecture
  - Prefect: Ghislain Hamel

Area
  - Total: 1,987.10 km^{2} (767.22 sq mi)
  - Land: 1,912.49 km^{2} (738.42 sq mi)

Population (2016)
  - Total: 42,346
  - Density: 22.1/km^{2} (57/sq mi)
  - Change 2011-2016: ▼1.8%
  - Dwellings: 22,714
- Time zone: UTC−5 (EST)
  - Summer (DST): UTC−4 (EDT)
- Area codes: 418 and 581
- Website: www.mrc desappalaches.ca

Les Appalaches (French pronunciation: [lez‿apalaʃ]) is a regional county municipality (RCM) in the Chaudière-Appalaches region in southeastern Quebec, Canada. It was established in 1982 from parts of the historic counties of Beauce, Frontenac, Mégantic, and Wolfe. The county seat and largest city is Thetford Mines.

The name of the RCM is linked to its location in the Appalachian Mountains with Mounts Adstock, Caribou, Oak, and Saint-Adrien being the highest. Until 2008, it was known as L'Amiante Regional County Municipality, because of the importance of asbestos mining in the region (amiante is French for "asbestos").

== Subdivisions ==
There are 19 subdivisions within the RCM:

Cities & Towns (2)

- Disraeli
- Thetford Mines

Municipalities (13)

- Adstock
- Beaulac-Garthby
- East Broughton
- Irlande
- Kinnear's Mills
- Saint-Adrien-d'Irlande
- Sainte-Clotilde-de-Beauce
- Saint-Fortunat
- Saint-Jacques-de-Leeds
- Saint-Jean-de-Brébeuf
- Saint-Joseph-de-Coleraine
- Saint-Julien
- Saint-Pierre-de-Broughton

Parishes (4)

- Disraeli
- Sacré-Cœur-de-Jésus
- Sainte-Praxède
- Saint-Jacques-le-Majeur-de-Wolfestown

== Demographics ==
=== Language ===
Mother tongue from Canada 2016 Census

| Language | Population | Pct (%) |
|---|---|---|
| French only | 40,675 | 97.7% |
| English only | 495 | 1.2% |
| Both English and French | 145 | 0.3% |
| Other languages | 325 | 0.8% |

== Transportation ==
=== Access Routes ===
Highways and numbered routes that run through the municipality, including external routes that start or finish at the county border:

- Autoroutes
  - None
- Principal Highways
  - R-108
  - R-112
  - R-165
- Secondary Highways
  - R-216
  - R-263
  - R-267
  - R-269
  - R-271
- External Routes
  - None

== Attractions ==
- Chemins Craig and Gosford Historic Route
- Serpentine-de-Coleraine Ecological Reserve (Saint-Joseph-de-Coleraine)
- Frontenac National Park (Adstock)
- Heritage Kinnear's Mills (Kinnear's Mills)
- Mount Adstock (Adstock)
- Musée minéralogique et minier de Thetford Mines (Thetford Mines)
- Thetford Mines Bike Path (Thetford Mines)

== See also ==
- List of regional county municipalities and equivalent territories in Quebec
