= Rivière aux Bluets =

River in Estrie, Quebec (Canada)

Blueberries River Old names: Rivière aux Bleuets, Blueberry river and Tierney river
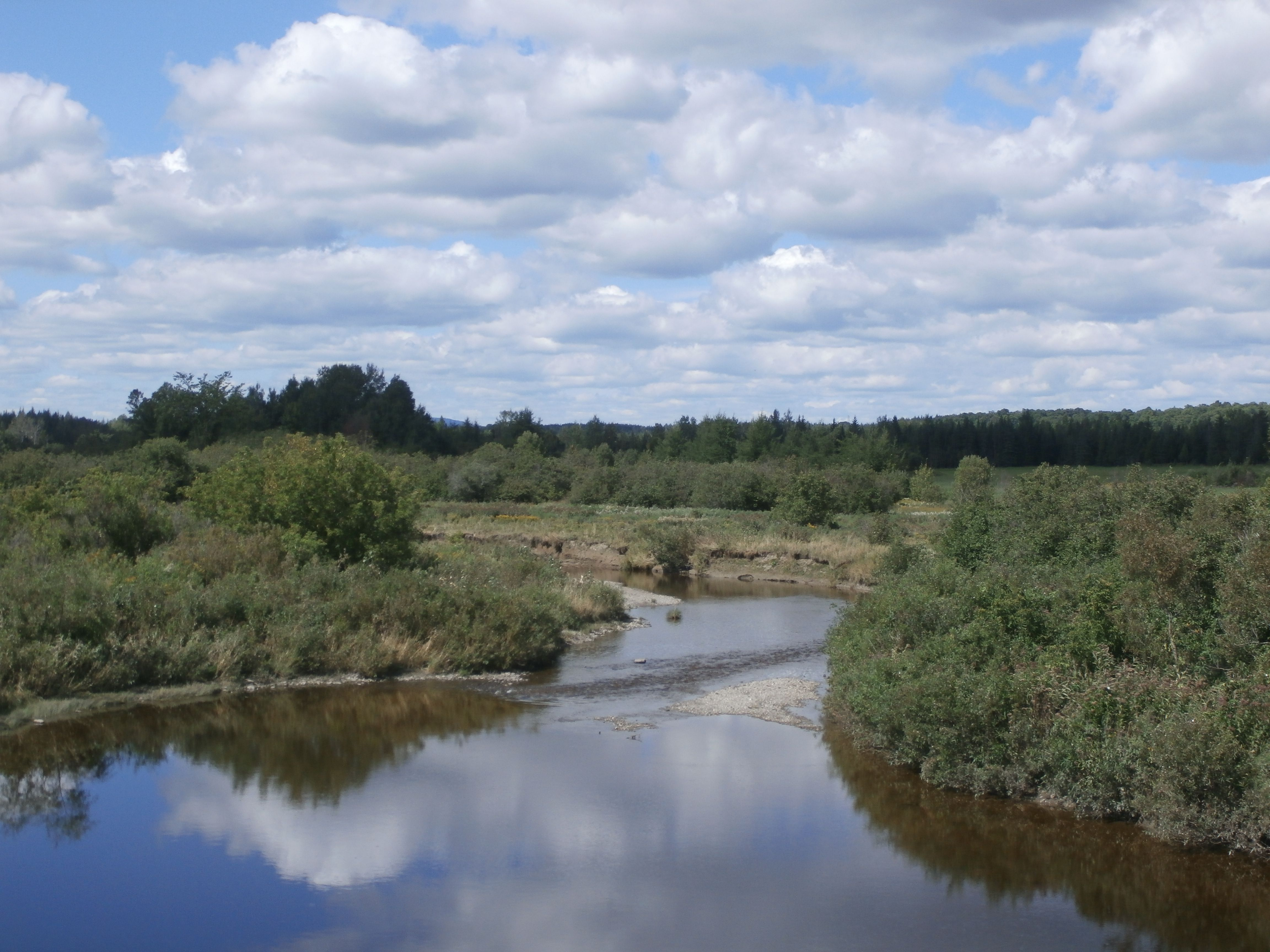
- Rivière aux Bluets (lac Saint-François) en aval de la route 108 à Lambton.
- Native name: Rivière aux Bluets (French)

Location
- Country: Canada
- Province: Quebec
- Region: Chaudière-Appalaches
- MRC: Le Granit Regional County Municipality
- Municipality: Saint-Hilaire-de-Dorset, Courcelles-Saint-Évariste, Lambton

Physical characteristics
- Source: Forest streams
  - location: Saint-Hilaire-de-Dorset
  - coordinates: 45.797092°N 70.861352°W
  - elevation: 477 m (1,565 ft)
- Mouth: Grand lac Saint François
  - location: Courcelles-Saint-Évariste
  - coordinates: 45.92972°N 71.14777°W
  - elevation: 288 m (945 ft)
- Length: 35.8 km (22.2 mi)

Basin features
- Progression: Grand lac Saint François, Saint-François River, St. Lawrence River
- Tributaries
  - left: (upstream) Rivière aux Bluets Sud
  - right: (upstream) ruisseau Vaseux, ruisseau Terre Noire, ruisseau Fontaine

The rivière aux Bluets (in English: Blueberries River) is a tributary of Grand lac Saint François which constitutes the head lake of the Saint-François River. The course of the "Rivière aux Bluets" crosses the territory of the municipalities of Saint-Hilaire-de-Dorset, Courcelles-Saint-Évariste and Lambton, in the Le Granit Regional County Municipality, in the administrative region of Estrie, on the South Shore of the St. Lawrence River, in Quebec, Canada.

== Geography ==
The main hydrographic slopes near the "Rivière aux Bluets" are:

- north side: Petite rivière Muskrat, Hamel River;
- east side: rivière Grande Coudée, Petite rivière du Portage;
- south side: Ludgine River, Madisson River, Grand lac Saint François;
- west side: Muskrat river, rivière de l'Or.

The "Rivière aux Bluets" has its source in a mountainous area in the seventh rang, south of the village of Saint-Hilaire-de-Dorset, north-east of the village of Saint-Sébastien, north-west of Saint-Ludger, west of rivière de la Grande Coudée and north of Drolet Lake. This area is located in the municipality of Saint-Hilaire-de-Dorset in the Beauce-Sartigan Regional County Municipality).

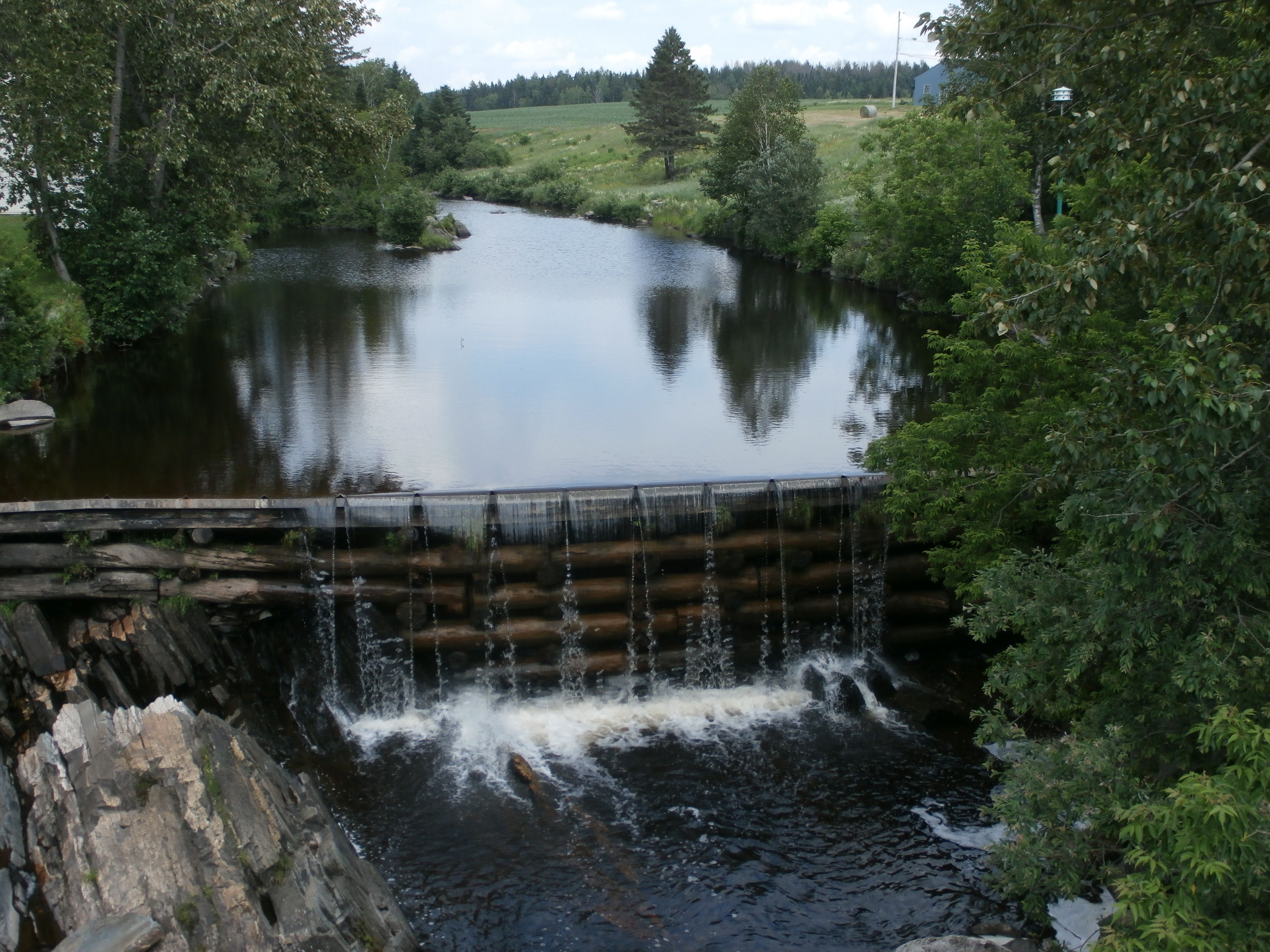
Barrage of the Bluets river in the village of Courcelles-Saint-Évariste.

From its head, the "Rivière aux Bluets" flows on 7.7 kilometres (4.8 mi) towards the north-west, up to the municipal limit between Saint-Hilaire-de-Dorset and Courcelles-Saint-Évariste; on 7.7 kilometres (4.8 mi) north-west, to the bridge in the village of Courcelles-Saint-Évariste near the Moulin Bernier; on 0.5 kilometres (0.31 mi) towards the southwest to the confluence with the rivière aux Bluets Sud located to the south of the village.

The river continues its course on 3.2 kilometres (2.0 mi) towards the northwest, winding up to route 108; on 8.4 kilometres (5.2 mi) towards the north-west winding up to the "Terre Noire brook" (coming from the north-east); on 2.9 kilometres (1.8 mi) to the north; on 5.4 kilometres (3.4 mi) towards the west until its mouth.

The mouth of the "rivière aux Bluets" empties at the end of a bay which constitutes an extension of the northeast shore of Grand lac Saint François.

== Toponymy ==
The toponym "Rivière aux Bluets" was officially registered on December 5, 1968, at the Commission de toponymie du Québec.

== See also ==
- Frontenac National Park
- List of rivers of Quebec
