= La Petite Rivière (Grand lac Saint François) =

River in Estrie, Quebec (Canada)

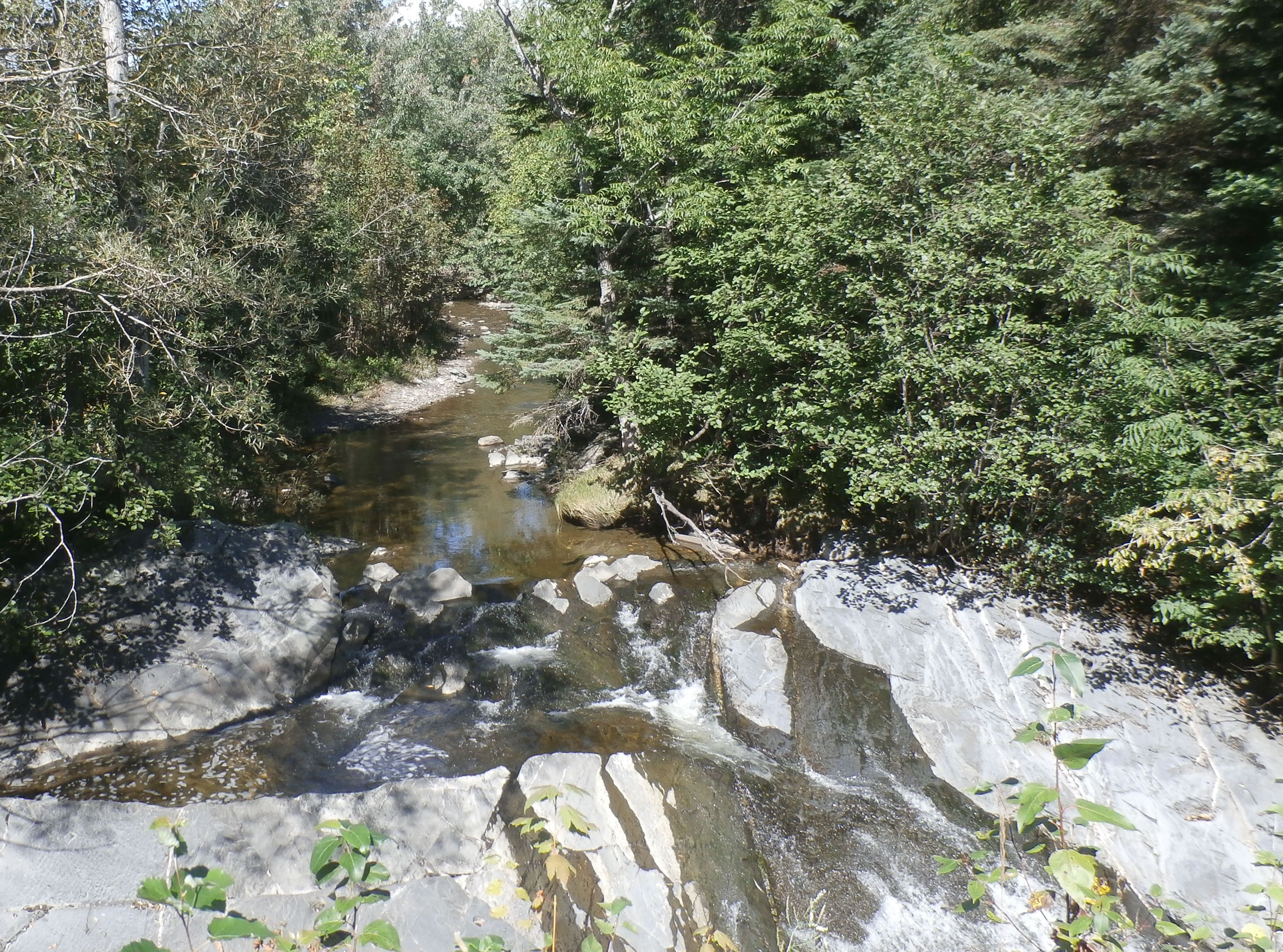
- La Petite Rivière (Lac Saint-François) upstream of the Rang Saint-Michel bridge in Lambton.

Location
- Country: Canada
- Province: Quebec
- Region: Chaudière-Appalaches
- MRC: Le Granit Regional County Municipality
- Municipality: Lambton

Physical characteristics
- Source: Forest streams
  - location: Lambton
  - coordinates: 45.819801°N 71.063621°W
  - elevation: 463 m (1,519 ft)
- Mouth: Grand lac Saint François
  - location: Lambton
  - coordinates: 45.84472°N 71.11222°W
  - elevation: 289 m (948 ft)
- Length: 8.4 km (5.2 mi)

Basin features
- Progression: Grand lac Saint François, Saint-François River, St. Lawrence River

La petite Rivière (in English: The Little River) is a tributary of Grand lac Saint François which constitutes the head lake of Saint-François River. The course of "La petite Rivière" crosses the territory of the municipality of Lambton, in the Le Granit Regional County Municipality, in the administrative region of Estrie, on the South Shore of the St. Lawrence River, in Quebec, Canada.

== Geography ==
The main hydrographic slopes near "La petite Rivière" are:

- north side: rivière aux Bluets (Grand lac Saint François), rivière aux Bluets Sud;
- east side: rivière aux Bluets (Grand lac Saint François), Champagne stream;
- south side: Sauvage River (Felton River tributary), brook de la Languette, brook Rouge;
- west side: Grand lac Saint François.

"La Petite Rivière" has its source in an agricultural zone in the 3e rang, east of the village of Lambton, south of route 108, west of fourth rang road, west of the head of Champagne brook (a tributary of the rivière aux Bluets (Grand lac Saint François).

From its head area, the river flows on 2.1 kilometres (1.3 mi) towards the north; then forks north-west to follow 2.1 kilometres (1.3 mi) the fourth rang road (on the southwest side); 2.0 kilometres (1.2 mi) westward crossing route 108 at 1.7 kilometres (1.1 mi) north of the intersection of rue Principale and 2nd Avenue (chemin du 2e rang) of Lambton; 1.5 kilometres (0.93 mi) south-west to the confluence with a small stream (coming from the east) that crosses the village of Lambton; and 0.7 kilometres (0.43 mi) westward, crossing under the Rang Saint-Michel bridge, to its mouth. Its route is generally in an agricultural zone, except in the head zone and the forest islets it crosses.

"La Petite Rivière" empties at the bottom of a very small bay, on the east shore of Grand lac Saint François, west of the center of the village of Lambton, facing the "Pointe Richard" (west shore of the lake) and at 3.5 kilometres (2.2 mi) north of the mouth of Ruisseau Rouge which is located south of Grand lac Saint François.

== Toponymy ==
The toponym "La petite Rivière" was officially registered on August 4, 1969, at the Commission de toponymie du Québec.

== See also ==
- List of rivers of Quebec
