= Rivière du Nord (Muskrat River tributary) =

River in Chaudière-Appalaches, Quebec, Canada

- Location within Quebec

Location
- Country: Canada
- Province: Quebec
- Region: Chaudière-Appalaches
- MRC: Les Appalaches Regional County Municipality
- Municipality: Adstock

Physical characteristics
- Source: Agricultural and forest streams
  - location: Adstock
  - coordinates: 46.071647°N 71.13151°W
  - elevation: 439 m (1,440 ft)
- Mouth: Muskrat River
  - location: Adstock
  - coordinates: 46.01639°N 71.12055°W
  - elevation: 322 m (1,056 ft)
- Length: 7.1 km (4.4 mi)

Basin features
- Progression: Muskrat River, Saint-François River, St. Lawrence River
- Tributaries
  - left: (upstream) branche Tardif
  - right: (upstream)

The Rivière du Nord (French pronunciation: [ʁivjɛʁ dy nɔʁ], lit. 'river of the North') is a tributary of Muskrat River (via Lake Bolduc) which flows downstream to Grand lac Saint François, on the South Shore of the St. Lawrence River. The course of the "rivière du Nord" crosses the territory of the municipality of Adstock, in the Les Appalaches Regional County Municipality, in the administrative region of Chaudière-Appalaches, in Quebec, Canada.

== Geography ==
From Bolduc Lake, the Muskrat River flows on 5.3 kilometres (3.3 mi) towards the southwest in a forest environment, collecting water from the Poulin and Rodrigue rivers and passing east of the village of Saint-Daniel, up to its mouth.

== Toponymy ==
The toponym "Rivière du nord" was officially registered on August 4, 1969, at the Commission de toponymie du Québec.

== See also ==
- List of rivers of Quebec
