= Muskrat River (Grand lac Saint François) =

River in Chaudière-Appalaches, Quebec (Canada)

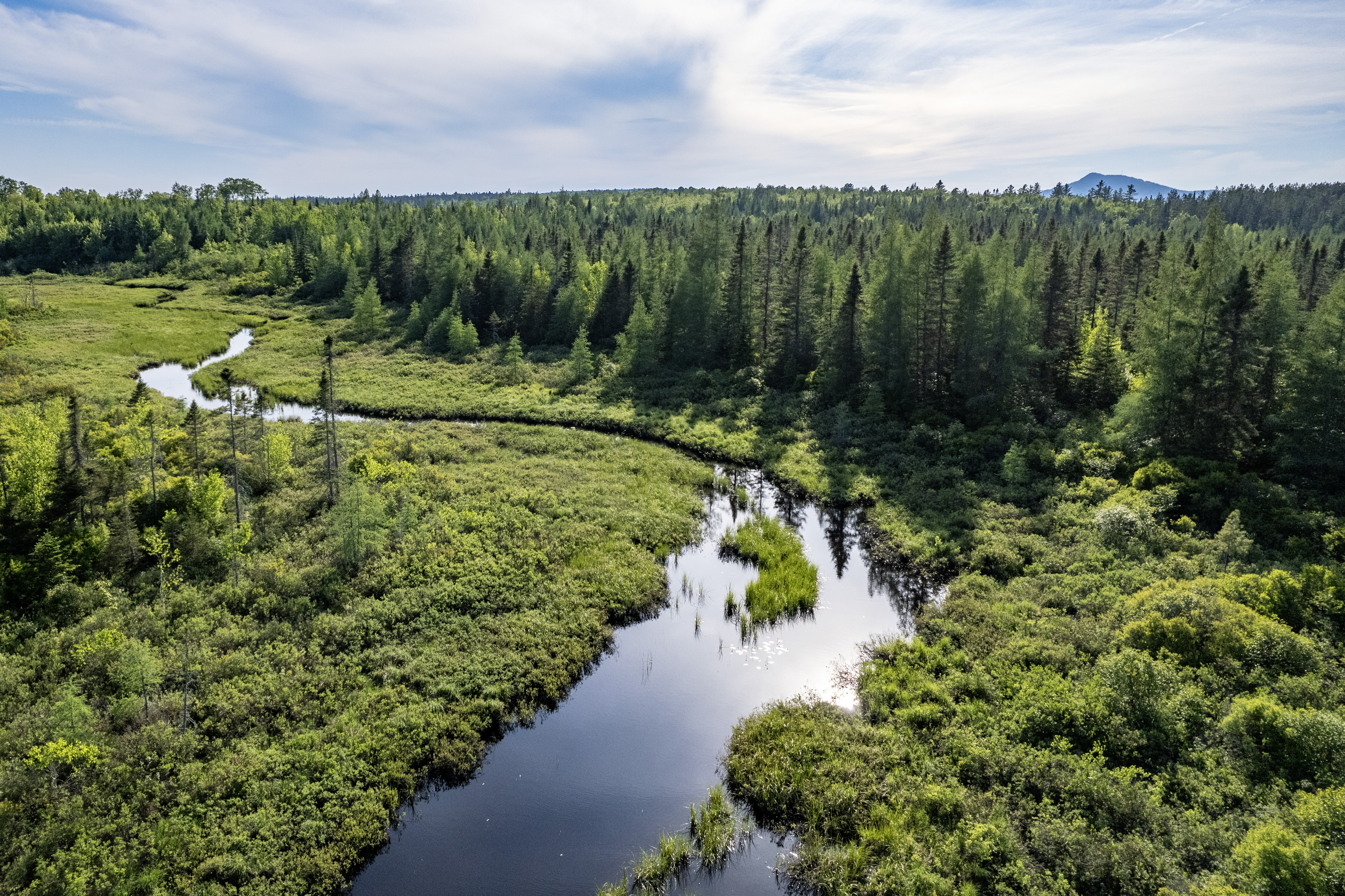

- Location within Quebec
- Native name: Rivière Muskrat (French)

Location
- Country: Canada
- Province: Quebec
- Region: Chaudière-Appalaches
- MRC: Les Appalaches Regional County Municipality
- Municipality: Adstock

Physical characteristics
- Source: Agricultural and forest streams
  - location: Adstock
  - coordinates: 46.018246°N 71.063679°W
  - elevation: 341 m (1,119 ft)
- Mouth: Grand lac Saint François
  - location: Saint-Joseph-de-Coleraine
  - coordinates: 45.98722°N 71.16306°W
  - elevation: 288 m (945 ft)
- Length: 12.2 km (7.6 mi)

Basin features
- Progression: Saint-François River, St. Lawrence River
- Tributaries
  - left: (upstream) cours d'eau Bolduc, Cours d'eau Turgeon
  - right: (upstream) cours d'eau Rodrigue, rivière du Nord (Muskrat River tributary), cours d'eau Philippe-Bolduc, cours d'eau Therrien

The Muskrat River (in French: rivière Muskrat) is a tributary of Grand lac Saint François which constitutes the head lake of the Saint-François River. The course of the Muskrat river "crosses the territory of the municipality of Adstock, in the Les Appalaches Regional County Municipality, in the administrative region of Chaudière-Appalaches, on the South Shore of the St. Lawrence River, in Quebec, Canada.

== Geography ==
The main neighboring watersheds of the Muskrat River are:

- north side: Tardif-Bizier stream, Hamel River, Fortin-Dupuis River, Prévost-Gilbert River;
- east side: Petite rivière Muskrat;
- south side: Grand lac Saint François;
- west side: rivière de l'Or.

The Muskrat River has its source south of the village of Saint-Method-de-Frontenac and north of Lake Rochu (altitude: 343 metres (1,125 ft)).

From its head, the Muskrat River flows on 5.1 kilometres (3.2 mi) westward, crossing route 267, to the east shore of Lac Bolduc (length 1.8 kilometres (1.1 mi); maximum width: 0.8 kilometres (0.50 mi); altitude: 311 metres (1,020 ft)) that the current crosses along its full length to the west. The south and east shores of Lake Bolduc have several dozen cabins.

From Bolduc Lake, the Muskrat River flows on 5.3 kilometres (3.3 mi) towards the southwest in a forest environment, collecting water from the Poulin and Rodrigue rivers and passing east of the village of Saint-Daniel, up to its mouth.

The mouth of the Muskrat river flows into a marsh area (on the east side) at the bottom of the "Baie aux Rats Musqués" which is an extension of the northeast shore of Grand lac Saint François. The mouth of the Muskrat River flows at its confluence with the Petite rivière Muskrat, in the northern area of Frontenac National Park.

== Toponymy ==
Formerly, this river was also designated according to the French appellation: rivière aux Rats Musqués.

The toponym "Rivière Muskrat" was officially registered on August 4, 1969, at the Commission de toponymie du Québec.

== See also ==
- List of rivers of Quebec
