= Caribou Lake (Chaudières-Appalaches) =

Lake in Saint-Joseph-de-Coleraine, Quebec, Canada

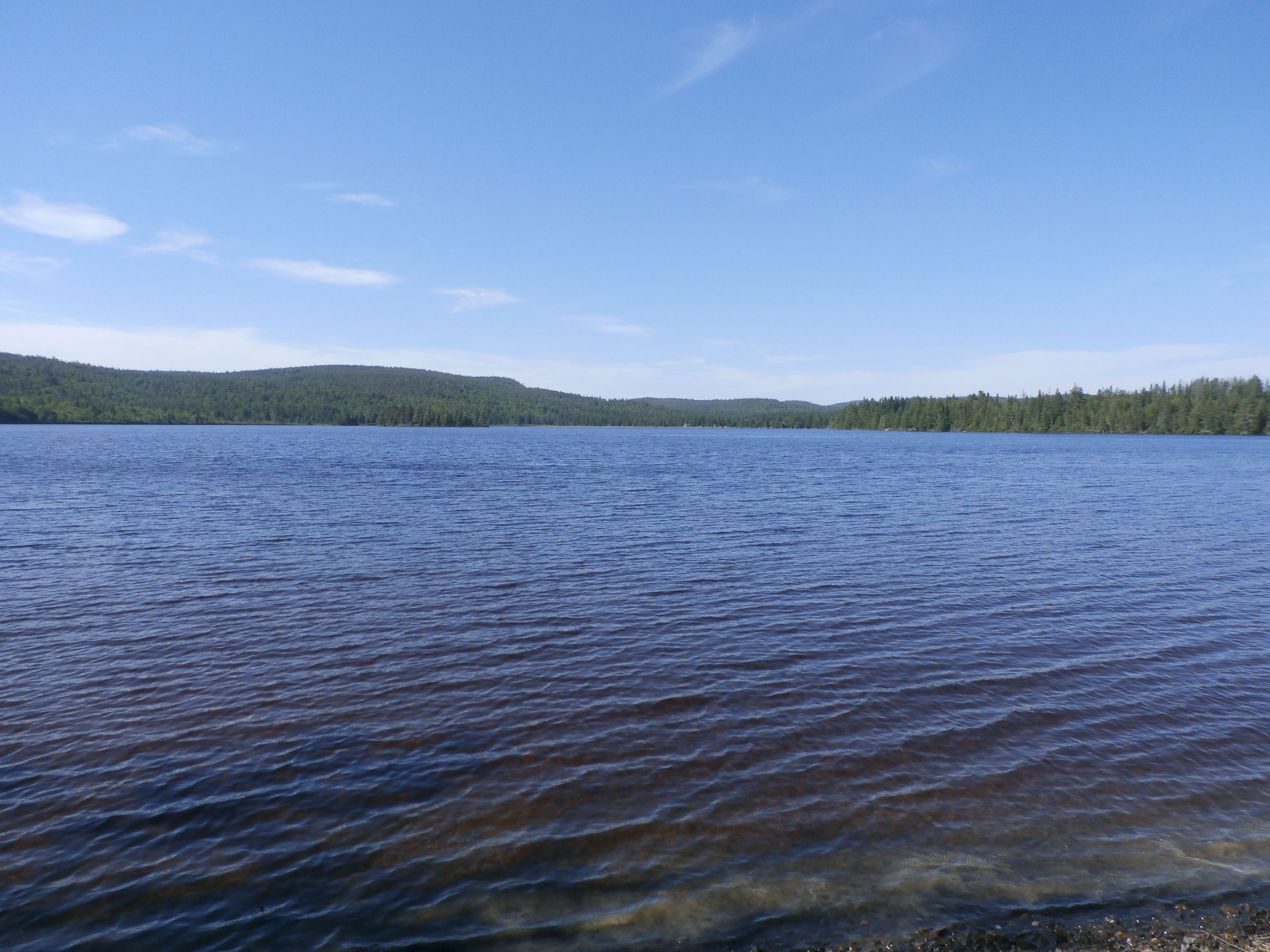
- Caribou Lake seen from the 12e rang road.

- Location within Quebec
- Coordinates: 46.01533°N 71.33184°W
- Primary inflows: Ashberham River
- Primary outflows: Ashberham River
- Basin countries: Canada, Quebec
- Max. length: 2.4 kilometres (1.5 mi)
- Max. width: 0.8 kilometres (0.50 mi)
- Average depth: 4.88 metres (16.0 ft)
- Surface elevation: 335 metres (1,099 ft)

The Lac Caribou is a lake located in the municipality of Saint-Joseph-de-Coleraine, in the MRC des Les Appalaches Regional County Municipality, in the administrative region of Chaudière-Appalaches, in Quebec, Canada.

It is crossed by the Ashberham River which originates on the southern flank of the Collines de Bécancour. The discharge from the lake crosses Petit lac Saint-François, before joining Grand lac Saint François, source of the Saint-François River which joins the St. Lawrence River.

== Geography ==
Its area is approximately 368 acres (149 ha), its elevation is 335 meters (1,099 ft) and its maximum depth is 4.88 meters (16.0 ft). The route 112 gives access to the lake.
