= Petite rivière Muskrat =

River in Chaudière-Appalaches, Quebec (Canada)

Location
- Country: Canada
- Province: Quebec
- Region: Chaudière-Appalaches
- MRC: Les Appalaches Regional County Municipality
- Municipality: Adstock

Physical characteristics
- Source: Forest streams
  - location: Adstock
  - coordinates: 45.976083°N 71.089083°W
  - elevation: 391 m (1,283 ft)
- Mouth: Grand lac Saint François
  - location: Adstock
  - coordinates: 45.98306°N 71.15916°W
  - elevation: 289 m (948 ft)
- Length: 9.2 km (5.7 mi)

Basin features
- Progression: Saint-François River, St. Lawrence River
- Tributaries
  - left: (upstream)
  - right: (upstream)

The Petite rivière Muskrat (in English: Little Muskrat River) is a tributary of Grand lac Saint François which constitutes the head lake of the Saint-François River. The course of the "Petite rivière Muskrat" crosses the territory of the municipality of Adstock, in the Les Appalaches Regional County Municipality, in the administrative region of Chaudière-Appalaches, on the South Shore of the St. Lawrence River, in Quebec, Canada.

== Geography ==
The main neighboring watersheds of the Petite rivière Muskrat are:

- north side: Muskrat river, Hamel River;
- east side: Hamel River;
- south side: Rivière aux Bluets (Grand lac Saint François), Grand lac Saint François;
- west side: Muskrat River, rivière de l'Or.

The "Petite rivière Muskrat" takes its source south of the village of "Saint-Method-de-Frontenac" and to the east of Lake Rochu (altitude: 343 metres (1,125 ft)). This zone is located almost at the eastern limit of the Les Appalaches Regional County Municipality (MRC) and Beauce-Sartigan. The head of the Muskrat River is located 3.6 kilometres (2.2 mi) north of the head of the "Petite rivière Muskrat".

From its head, the Petite rivière Muskrat flows on 3.9 kilometres (2.4 mi) towards the southwest, passing south of lakes Rochu and Bolduc, to the limit of Parc national de Frontenac; on 2.1 kilometres (1.3 mi) towards the north-west leaving the Park, up to a small stream (coming from the east); on 3.2 kilometres (2.0 mi) westward crossing the park boundary to its mouth, located near a road bridge that spans the small bay.

The mouth of the "Little Muskrat River" empties into a marsh area at the bottom of the "Baie aux Rats Musqués" which is an extension of the northeast shore of Grand lac Saint François. The mouth of the Muskrat River flows at its confluence with the Muskrat River, in the northern area of Frontenac National Park.

== Toponymy ==
Formerly, this watercourse was known under the French name: "Petite rivière aux Rats Musqués".

The toponym "Petite rivière Muskrat" was officially registered on August 4, 1969, at the Commission de toponymie du Québec.

== See also ==
- List of rivers of Quebec
