= Rivière aux Bluets Sud =

River in Estrie, Quebec (Canada)

Rivière aux Bluets Sud Old name: "Rivière aux Bleuets Sud"
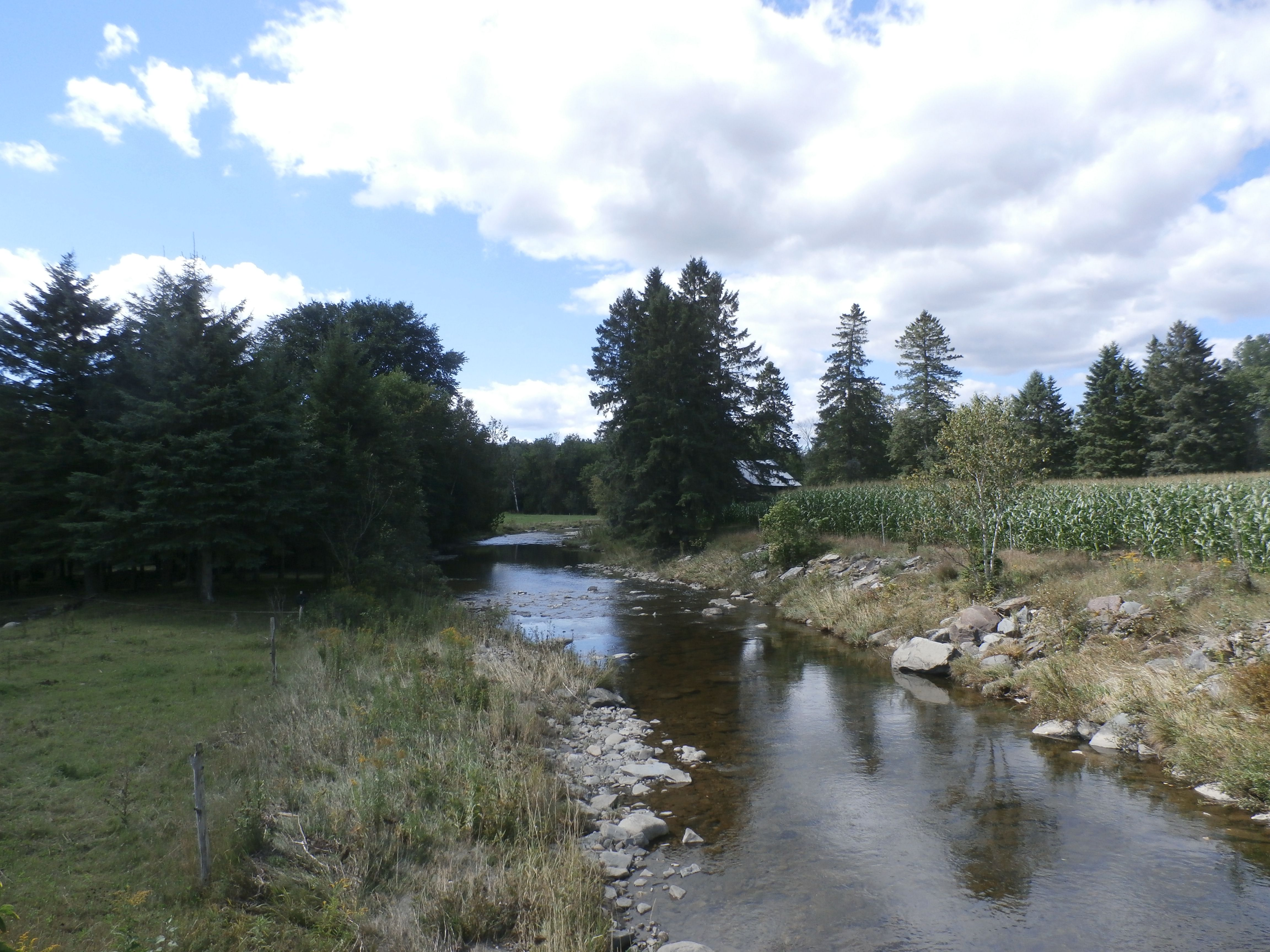
- Rivière aux Bluets Sud, near Courcelles-Saint-Évariste.

Location
- Country: Canada
- Province: Quebec
- Region: Chaudière-Appalaches
- MRC: Le Granit Regional County Municipality
- Municipality: Saint-Sébastien, Courcelles-Saint-Évariste

Physical characteristics
- Source: Forest streams
  - location: Saint-Sébastien
  - coordinates: 45.762258°N 70.938057°W
  - elevation: 577 m (1,893 ft)
- Mouth: Grand lac Saint François
  - location: Courcelles-Saint-Évariste
  - coordinates: 45.86944°N 70.99028°W
  - elevation: 305 m (1,001 ft)
- Length: 17.3 km (10.7 mi)

Basin features
- Progression: Grand lac Saint François, Saint-François River, St. Lawrence River
- Tributaries
  - left: (upstream) ruisseau Champagne, ruisseau Castonguay
  - right: (upstream)

The Rivière aux Bluets Sud (in English: Blueberries South River) is a tributary of the rivière aux Bluets which flows into the east shore of Grand lac Saint François; the latter constitutes the head lake of the Saint-François River.

The course of the "Rivière aux Bluets Sud" crosses the territory of the municipalities of Saint-Sébastien and Courcelles-Saint-Évariste, in the Le Granit Regional County Municipality, in the administrative region of Estrie, on the South Shore of the St. Lawrence River, in Quebec, Canada.

== Geography ==
The main hydrographic slopes close to the "Rivière aux Bluets Sud" are:

- north side: rivière aux Bluets (Grand lac Saint François), Petite rivière Muskrat;
- east side: rivière aux Bluets (Grand lac Saint François);
- south side:Sauvage River (Felton River);
- west side:Grand lac Saint François.

The "Rivière aux Bluets Sud" has its source on the northern slope of the "Morne de Saint-Sébastien" at 1.2 kilometres (0.75 mi) from the summit which reaches 805 metres (2,641 ft). This spring is located 3.5 kilometres (2.2 mi) east of the intersection of route du rang second and route du first rang, in the village of Saint-Sébastien.

From its source, the river flows over:

- 1.2 kilometres (0.75 mi) north-west, to the rang 10 road that the river crosses at 1.0 kilometre (0.62 mi) north-east of the intersection of route 263;
- 1.4 kilometres (0.87 mi) towards the north-west, to the confluence of two streams (coming from the south-west), located at 0.4 kilometres (0.25 mi) east of the road to iron;
- 2.3 kilometres (1.4 mi) north-east to the fourth rang road;
- 1.8 kilometres (1.1 mi) north-west, up to Route du Domaine;
- 3.3 kilometres (2.1 mi) north, up to a rural road;
- 4.6 kilometres (2.9 mi) towards the north-west, in Courcelles-Saint-Évariste, up to the confluence of the Castonguay stream (coming from the south);
- 2.7 kilometres (1.7 mi) towards the north-west, collecting the water from the Champagne stream (coming from the south) and passing to the south-west of the village of Courcelles-Saint-Évariste, until at its mouth.

The mouth of the "rivière aux Bleuts Sud" empties on the south shore of the rivière aux Bluets (Grand lac Saint François), which flows north-west to flow onto the east bank of the Grand lac Saint François.

== Toponymy ==
The toponym "Rivière aux Bluets Sud" was officially registered on December 5, 1968, at the Commission de toponymie du Québec.

== See also ==
- List of rivers of Quebec
