= Ashberham River =

River in Chaudière-Appalaches, Quebec (Canada)

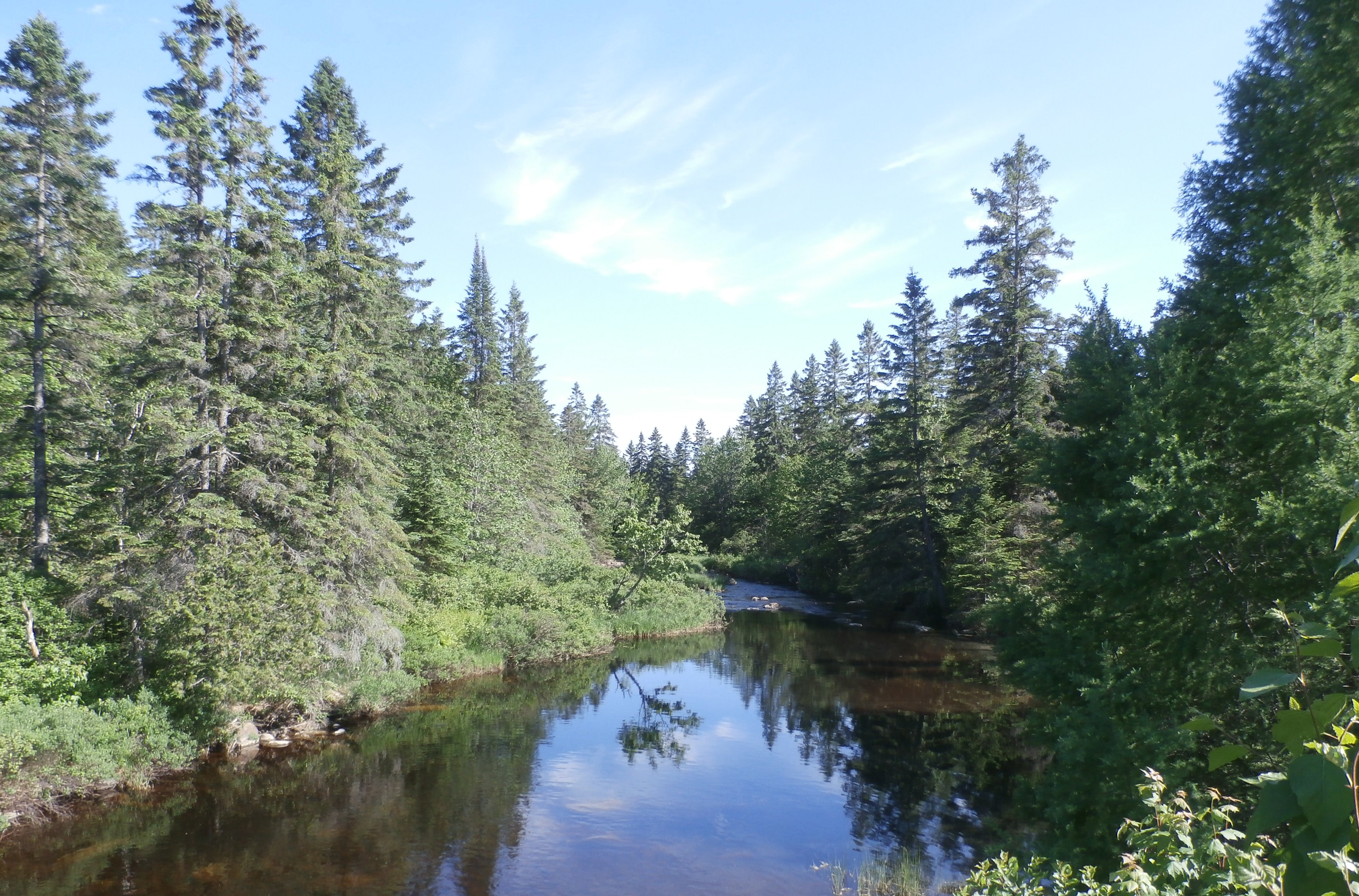
- Ashberham River downstream from Chemin du Petit-Lac-Saint-François towards Grand Lac Saint-François.
- Native name: Rivière Ashberham (French)

Location
- Country: Canada
- Province: Quebec
- Region: Chaudière-Appalaches
- MRC: Les Appalaches Regional County Municipality
- Municipality: Saint-Joseph-de-Coleraine

Physical characteristics
- Source: Mountain streams
  - location: Saint-Joseph-de-Coleraine
  - coordinates: 46.064937°N 71.313184°W
  - elevation: 408 m (1,339 ft)
- Mouth: Grand lac Saint François
  - location: Saint-Joseph-de-Coleraine
  - coordinates: 45.97583°N 71.25222°W
  - elevation: 288 m (945 ft)
- Length: 20.0 km (12.4 mi)

Basin features
- Progression: Saint-François River, St. Lawrence River
- Tributaries
  - left: (upstream) ruisseau Chrome, ruisseau Beebe
  - right: (upstream) ruisseau Dupuis

The Ashberham river (in French: rivière Ashberham) is a tributary of Grand lac Saint François which constitutes the head lake of the Saint-François River. The course of the Ashberham River crosses the territory of the municipality of Saint-Joseph-de-Coleraine, in the Les Appalaches Regional County Municipality, in the administrative region of Chaudière-Appalaches, on the South Shore of the St. Lawrence River, in Quebec, Canada.

== Geography ==
The main neighboring watersheds of the Ashberham River are:

- north side: Bécancour River, Bécancour Lake;
- east side: rivière de l'Or;
- south side: Grand lac Saint François;
- west side: Lake Noir, Bisby River, Bécancour River.

The Ashberham River has its source on the southern flank of the Collines de Bécancour, that is to say to the southwest of the Thetford Mines airport.

From there, the river descends on 8.3 kilometres (5.2 mi) first towards the southeast, then the south and the southwest, until it empties on the north shore of Caribou Lake (length: 2.2 kilometres (1.4 mi); altitude: 331) that the current crosses over 2.2 kilometres (1.4 mi) towards the southwest. This lake is located to the south of Collines Rééd and Colline Crabtree, to the south-east of Mont Quarry and to the east of Colline Provençal. The Thetford Mines mining sites are located on the northwest side of these mountains. The northern slope of the lake is mountainous. Its mouth flows to the southwest of the lake.

From Caribou Lake, the Ashberham River flows first 5.9 kilometres (3.7 mi) south, then southeast, to the mouth of Beebe Creek (from the north); and 0.8 kilometres (0.50 mi) east, crossing the road bridge, to the west shore of Petit lac Saint-François (Ashberham). This lake is completely surrounded by chalet.

The current crosses the Petit lac Saint-François on 1.5 kilometres (0.93 mi) towards the southwest to the mouth of the lake located to the south. Then, the river flows on 1.3 kilometres (0.81 mi) south to its mouth.

The mouth of the Ashberham river is located on the north shore of Grand lac Saint François, at 3.3 kilometres (2.1 mi) (on the water) northeast of the Jules-Allard dam which is erected at the mouth of Grand lac Saint François and 2.8 kilometres (1.7 mi) (on the water) southwest of the mouth of the rivière de l'Or.

== Toponymy ==
The toponym Rivière Ashberham was officially registered on December 5, 1968, at the Commission de toponymie du Québec.

== See also ==
- Saint-François River, a stream
- Grand lac Saint François, a watercourse
- Les Appalaches Regional County Municipality (MRC)
- Saint-Joseph-de-Coleraine, a municipality
- List of rivers of Quebec
