= Muskrat River =

Muskrat River may refer to:

- Muskrat River (Grand lac Saint François), a tributary of Grand lac Saint François, in Les Appalaches Regional County Municipality, Chaudière-Appalaches, Quebec, Canada
- Petite rivière Muskrat, a tributary of Grand lac Saint François in Les Appalaches Regional County Municipality, Chaudière-Appalaches, Quebec, Canada
- Muskrat River (Ontario), a stream in Renfrew County, Ontario, Canada

== See also ==
- Muskrat Creek, a tributary of the Seneca River in New York, United States
