= Rivière de l'Or =

River in Chaudière-Appalaches, Quebec, Canada

Location
- Country: Canada
- Province: Quebec
- Region: Chaudière-Appalaches
- MRC: Les Appalaches Regional County Municipality
- Municipality: Adstock, Saint-Joseph-de-Coleraine

Physical characteristics
- Source: Mountain streams
  - location: Adstock
  - coordinates: 46.062215°N 71.205628°W
  - elevation: 382 m (1,253 ft)
- Mouth: Grand lac Saint François
  - location: Saint-Joseph-de-Coleraine
  - coordinates: 45.98944°N 71.22611°W
  - elevation: 288 m (945 ft)
- Length: 8.6 km (5.3 mi)

Basin features
- Progression: Saint-François River, St. Lawrence River
- Tributaries
  - left: (upstream) ruisseau Delisle
  - right: (upstream) ruisseau Quenneville (provenant du lac Rond)

The rivière de l'Or (in English: Gold River) is a tributary of Grand lac Saint François which constitutes the head lake of the Saint-François River. The course of the "rivière de l'Or" crosses the territory of the municipalities of Adstock (in particular the sector of the former municipality of Saint-Method-de-Frontenac) and of Saint-Joseph-de-Coleraine, in the Les Appalaches Regional County Municipality, in the administrative region of Chaudière-Appalaches, on the South Shore of St. Lawrence River, in Quebec, Canada.

== Geography ==
The main neighboring watersheds of the Gold River are:

- north side: Bécancour River, Labonté stream;
- east side: Couture brook, Muskrat River, Noire River, Prévost-Gilbert River;
- south side: Grand lac Saint François;
- west side: Ashberham River.

The rivière de l'Or draws its source from Lac du Huit located in the municipality of Adstock, east of the Thetford Mines mining area, east of Bécancour Lake, west of route 269. This lake is located north of eighth rang, in the canton of Thetford and it extends to the tenth Rang. Its mouth is located on the south shore of the lake, at the end of the Baie des Bouleaux.

The Rivière de l'Or first flows on 1.2 kilometres (0.75 mi) towards the south to Baie des Fortin from lac à la Truite (length: 3.2 kilometres (2.0 mi); altitude: 379 metres (1,243 ft)) that the current crosses on 1.1 kilometres (0.68 mi), bypassing the Pointe du Fer à Cheval, towards the southwest to its mouth located in the extreme west Lake. This lake is a resort paradise.

Then the river resumes its course on 4.4 kilometres (2.7 mi) towards the south-west, passing the east of Thetford Mines airport, passing west of Mont Adstock, then crossing the route 267, up to the Quenneville stream (coming from the west). In its last segment, the Gold River flows on 1.9 kilometres (1.2 mi) towards the south, passing to the west of the Poudrier Hills, to empty at the bottom of a bay on the north shore of the Grand lac Saint François.

In its lower course, the river constitutes the demarcation between the municipalities of Saint-Joseph-de-Coleraine and Adstock (i.e. the former municipality of Saint-Method-de-Frontenac).

The mouth of the Gold River is located on the north shore of Grand lac Saint François, at 6.1 kilometres (3.8 mi) (on the water) northeast of the Jules-Allard dam which is erected at the mouth of Grand lac Saint François, at 2.8 kilometres (1.7 mi) (on the water) northeast of the mouth of the Ashberham River and west of the mouth of the Muskrat River.

== Toponymy ==
Formerly, this watercourse was known as the “Goldstream River” in English.

The toponym Rivière de l'Or was officially registered on August 4, 1969, at the Commission de toponymie du Québec.

== See also ==
- List of rivers of Quebec
