= Petit lac Saint-François (Ashberham) =

Lake in Saint-Joseph-de-Coleraine, Quebec, Canada

Petit Lac Saint-François
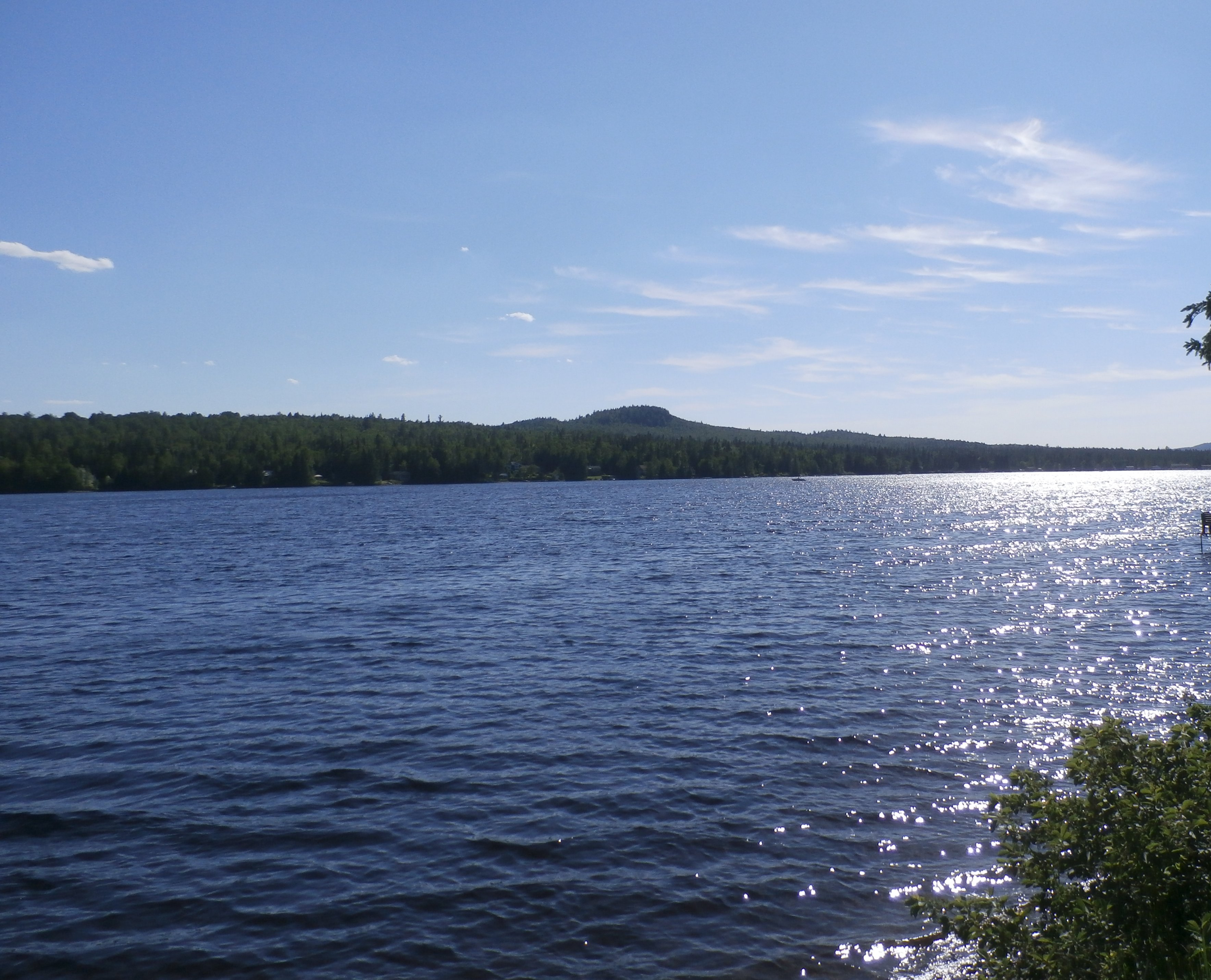
- The "Petit lac Saint-François".

- Location within Quebec
- Location: Les Appalaches Regional County Municipality, Quebec, Canada
- Coordinates: 45.98833°N 71.27184°W
- Primary inflows: Ashberham River
- Primary outflows: Grand lac Saint François (discharge going to...)
- Basin countries: Canada
- Max. length: 1.6 kilometres (0.99 mi)
- Max. width: 0.8 kilometres (0.50 mi)
- Surface elevation: 312 metres (1,024 ft)

The Petit lac Saint-François (in English: Little Lake Saint François) is a lake located near the municipality of Saint-Joseph-de-Coleraine in the administrative region of Chaudière-Appalaches, in Quebec, in Canada. It receives the waters of the Ashberham River which has its source in Caribou Lake. The discharge of the lake joins the Grand lac Saint François, source of the Saint-François River which joins the Saint Lawrence River.

== Geography ==
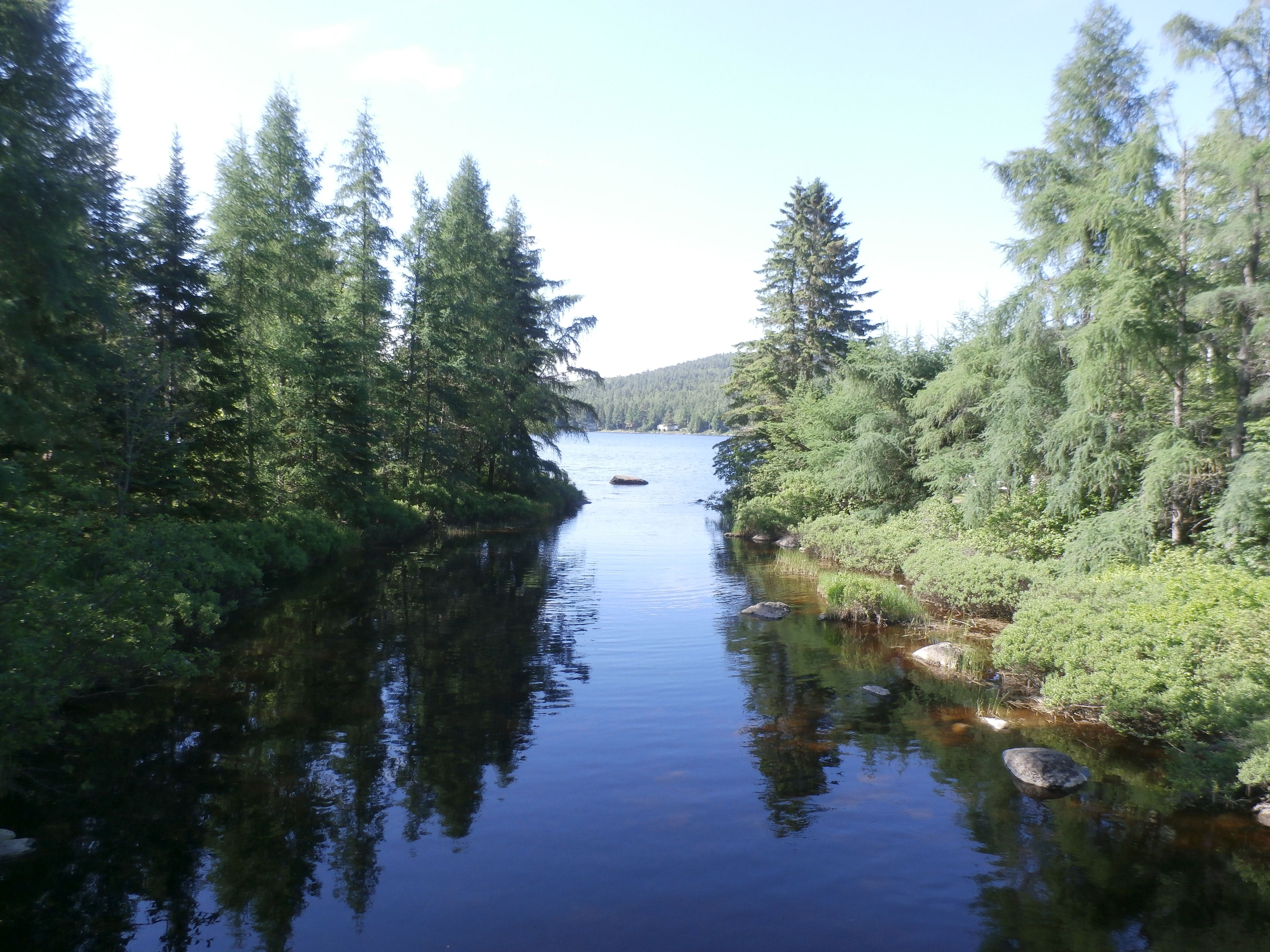
Ashberham River south of small lake Saint-François (Ashberham)

Its area is approximately 270 acres (110 ha), its elevation is 312 metres (1,024 ft), and its maximum depth is 14.63 metres (48.0 ft). The route 112 gives access to the lake. An Abenaki reserve of 2,722 acres (11 km^{2}) which was named Colraine Reserve was granted in 1853 in range #10 and range #11 west of the lake shore.; it was abandoned in 1882. The Bécancour Trail (Abenaki Becancour Trail), passed by there, linked the Bécancour River and the basin of the Saint-François river.
