= Glyn Watkins =

Australian Anglican priest

(Daniel) Glyn Watkins (16 November 1845 in Adstock, England – 29 June 1907 in Perth, Western Australia) was an Anglican priest, most notably Archdeacon of Perth, WA from 1889 until his death. There is a street named after him in Fremantle.

Watkins was educated at Christ's College, Cambridge and ordained in 1887. After a curacy in Basford he went as a Colonial Chaplain to Greenough, Western Australia in 1870. He was Rector of Fremantle from 1875 to 1905.

He died on 29 June 1907.
