= Courcelles, Quebec =

Courcelles
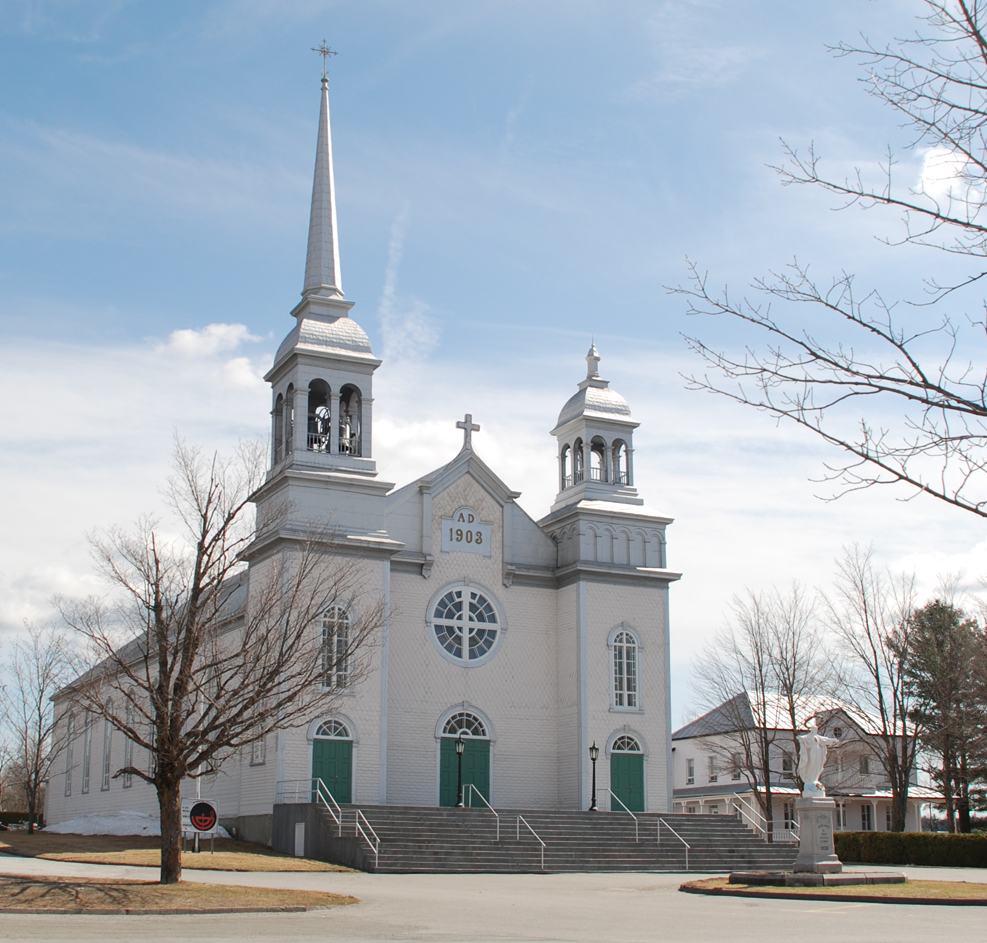
- View of Courcelles' Catholic Church

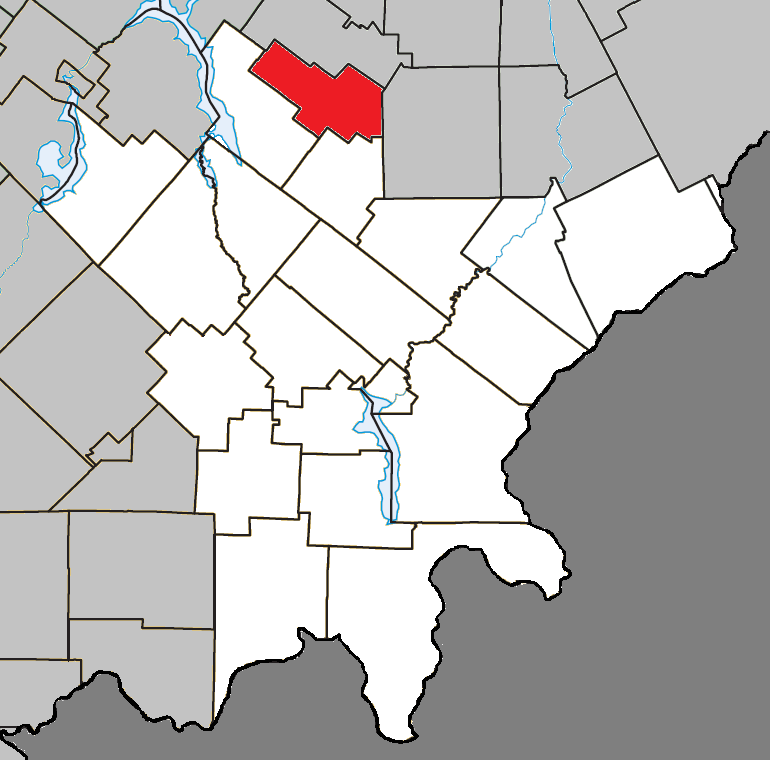
- Location within Le Granit RCM

- Location in southern Quebec
- Coordinates: 45°52′26″N 70°58′59″W
- Country: Canada
- Province: Quebec
- Region: Estrie
- RCM: Le Granit
- Constituted: April 6, 1904

Government
  - Mayor: Mario Quirion
  - Federal riding: Mégantic—L'Érable
  - Prov. riding: Beauce-Sud

Area
  - Total: 91.50 km^{2} (35.33 sq mi)
  - Land: 90.34 km^{2} (34.88 sq mi)

Population (2021)
  - Total: 814
  - Density: 9/km^{2} (23/sq mi)
  - Pop 2016-2021: ▼1.1%
  - Dwellings: 430
- Time zone: UTC−5 (EST)
  - Summer (DST): UTC−4 (EDT)
- Postal code(s): G0M 1C0
- Area codes: 418 and 581
- Highways: R-108
- Website: muncourcelles.qc.ca

Courcelles (French pronunciation: [kuʁsɛl]) was a municipality in Le Granit Regional County Municipality in the Estrie region in Quebec, Canada. It was approximately 105 km (65 mi) south of Quebec City.

Artist Carmen Coulombe was born in Courcelles.

== History ==
The Municipality of Courcelles was founded on April 6, 1904. It was made from parts of the neighboring municipalities of Lambton, Saint-Sébastien and Saint-Évariste-de-Forsyth.

On January 1, 2024, the municipality merged with Saint-Évariste-de-Forsyth to form the new municipality of Courcelles-Saint-Évariste.

== Demographics ==
In the 2021 Census, Statistics Canada reported that Courcelles had a population of 814 living in 391 of its 430 total dwellings, an -1.1% change from its 2016 population of 823.
