= Saint-Évariste-de-Forsyth, Quebec =

Saint-Évariste-de-Forsyth
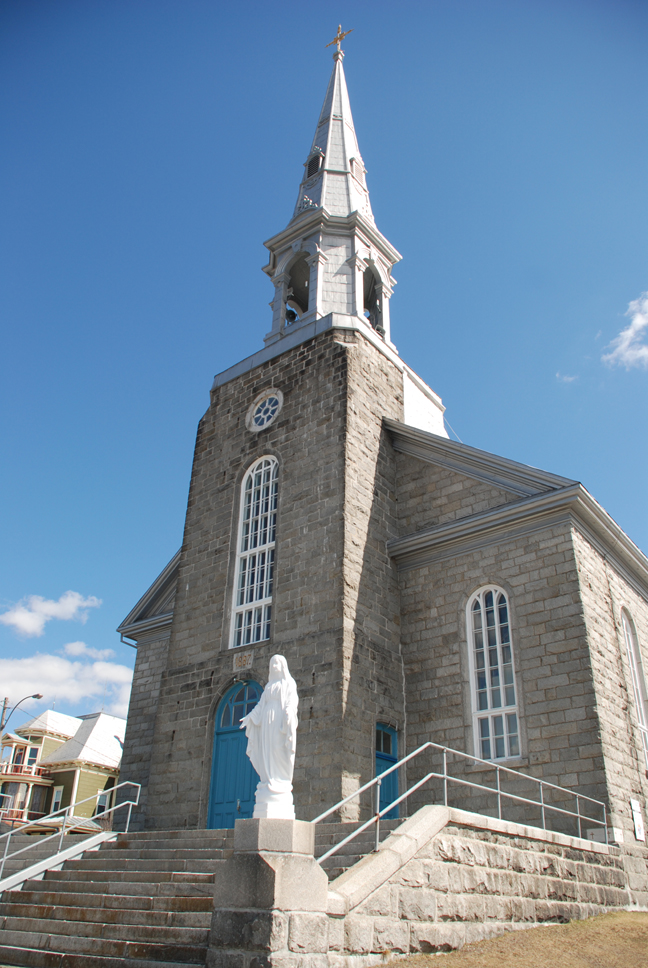
- Roman Catholic Church serving the parish of Saint-Évariste.

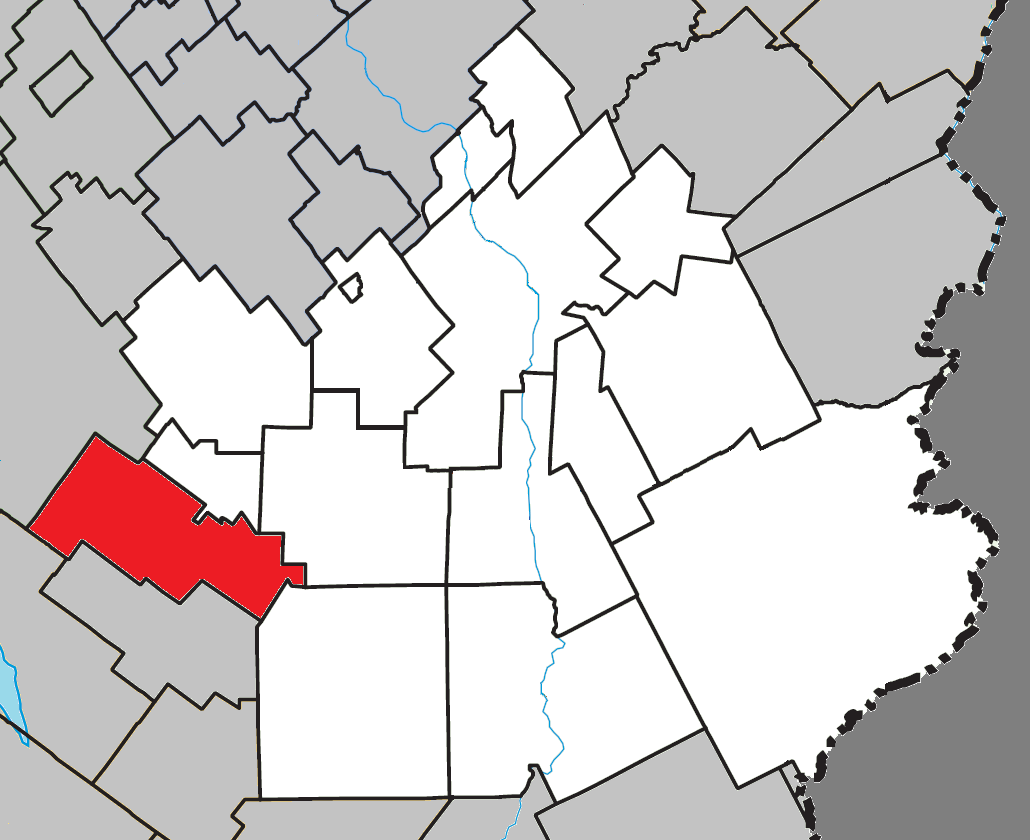
- Location within Beauce-Sartigan RCM.

- Location in southern Quebec.
- Coordinates: 45°56′N 70°57′W
- Country: Canada
- Province: Quebec
- Region: Chaudière-Appalaches
- RCM: Beauce-Sartigan
- Constituted: March 1, 1870
- Named for: Pope Evaristus, James Bell Forsyth

Government
  - Mayor: Gaétan Bégin
  - Federal riding: Beauce
  - Prov. riding: Beauce-Sud

Area
  - Total: 112.00 km^{2} (43.24 sq mi)
  - Land: 111.22 km^{2} (42.94 sq mi)

Population (2011)
  - Total: 525
  - Density: 4.7/km^{2} (12/sq mi)
  - Pop 2006-2011: ▼18.9%
  - Dwellings: 310
- Time zone: UTC−5 (EST)
  - Summer (DST): UTC−4 (EDT)
- Postal code(s): G0M 1S0
- Area codes: 418 and 581
- Highways: R-108
- Website: www.st-evariste.qc.ca

Saint-Évariste-de-Forsyth was a municipality in the Municipalité régionale de comté de Beauce-Sartigan in Quebec, Canada. It was part of the Chaudière-Appalaches region and the population was 647 at the 2006 census.

As with several other municipalities located in the Eastern Townships, Saint-Évariste-de-Forsyth derived its name from its Roman Catholic parish and its township. The parish is named after Pope Evaristus and the township after lumber baron James Bell Forsyth.

On January 1, 2024, the municipality merged with Courcelles to form the new municipality of Courcelles–Saint-Évariste.
