= Grand lac Saint François =

Lake in Estrie, Quebec, Canada

Lac Saint-François
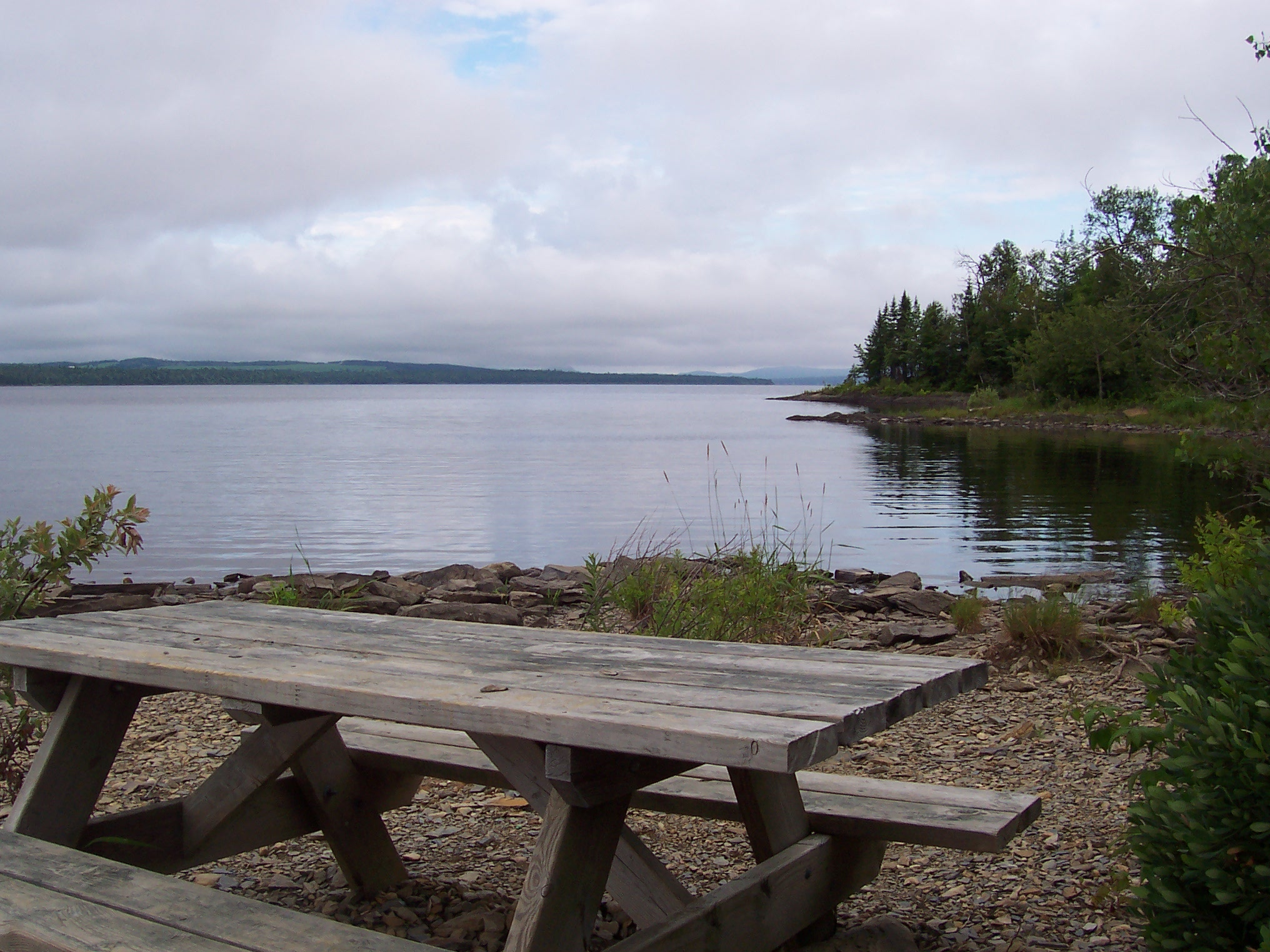

- Location within Quebec
- Location: Les Appalaches Regional County Municipality / Le Granit Regional County Municipality, Quebec
- Coordinates: 45°53′55″N 71°09′28″W
- Primary outflows: Saint-François River
- Basin countries: Canada
- Surface area: 51 km^{2} (20 sq mi)

The Grand lac Saint-François (French pronunciation: [ɡʁɑ̃ lak sɛ̃ fʁɑ̃swa]) is a freshwater body covering 51-square-kilometre (20 sq mi), in the administrative region of Chaudière-Appalaches, in southeastern Quebec, in Canada. This water body is located in two regional county municipality:

- Le Granit Regional County Municipality (MRC): in the municipalities of Lambton and Saint-Romain;
- Les Appalaches Regional County Municipality: in the municipalities of Sainte-Praxède, Saint-Joseph-de-Coleraine and Adstock.

This lake is located southeast of the city of Thetford Mines. It is the source of the Saint-François River.

Much of the lake is surrounded by the Frontenac National Park. Located in a forest environment, this lake is one of the main attractions of Parc national de Frontenac. The resort is very dense on the north shore of Grand Lac Saint-François. The surface of this body of water is generally frozen from mid-November to the end of April; however, the period of safe traffic on the ice is usually from mid-December to the end of March.

== Geography ==
This large lake in the Eastern Townships extends into the Les Appalaches Regional County Municipality and Le Granit Regional County Municipality. This body of water stretches in part in the Parc national de Frontenac.

Grand lac Saint-François is supplied with water by:

- south side: Red stream which passes north of Saint-Romain;
- south-west side: Felton River which flows north; discharge of the lakes at Barbue, des Îles, Egan, "du Brochet", "des Atacas" and Équerre; discharge from Bear Lake. These waters flow into the Baie Sauvage;
- west side: Marécage stream which flows into Giguère bay;
- north side: Ashberham River; Rivière de l'Or in the municipality of Saint-Joseph-de-Coleraine;
- northeast side: Muskrat River; Petite rivière Muskrat; Couture brook. These streams flow into Musque Rats Bay;
- east side: rivière aux Bluets; La Petite Rivière; outlet of Little Lambton Lake.

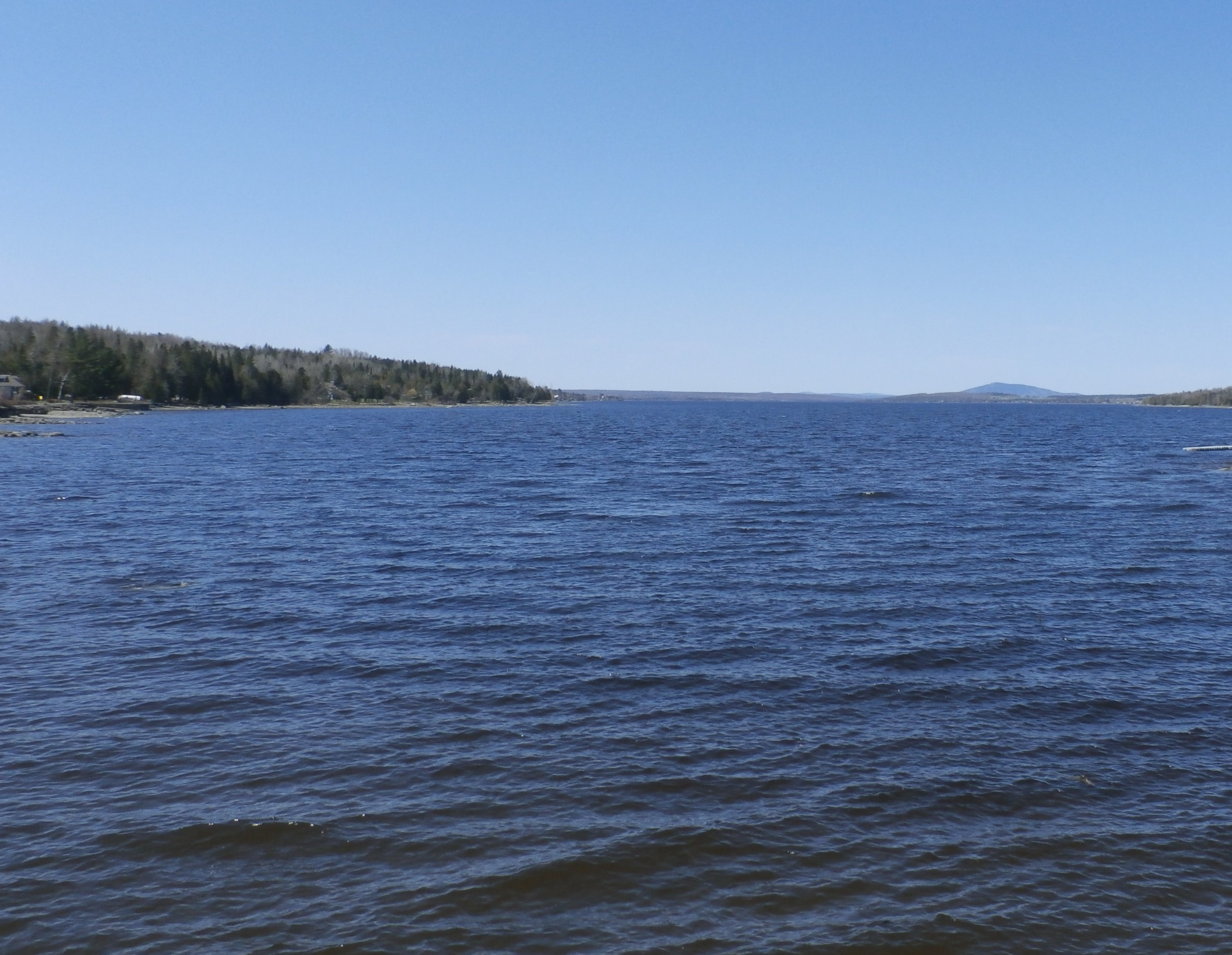
Grand lac Saint-François seen from the Rouge brook bridge on route 263 in Saint-Romain.

This large lake is characterized by Baie Sauvage (7.5 km long) located to the southwest of the lake. It has several islands, bays and peninsulas.

With an elongated shape covering 51 km^{2}, this lake stretches over more than 25 km; its width generally varies between 1.5 and 2.5 km. The maximum width of the lake is in the northern part, where the lake forms a long bay stretching southwest to the retaining dam located at the mouth. Grand lac Saint-François is the main head water body of the Saint-François River. This river flows a priori for 10.7 km towards the southwest to join Lake Aylmer at Disraeli, which the current crosses to head south.

== Toponymy ==
The name of the lake, which has the same origin as that of the river, evokes the memory of François de Lauson lord of La Citière whose land was limited by the river. In 1635, the Compagnie des Cent-Associés granted the seigneury of La Citière to his father Jean. This seigneury was bounded by this watercourse, as indicated in an act of 1638 signed by the governor of Montmagny.

The Abénaqui s name the lake "Ônkobagak", which means "connected lake". Before 2007, the lake was called Lac Saint-François. It was renamed to avoid confusion with Petit lac Saint-François (Ashberham) which is located 1.5 km northwest of it.

In 1815, the vast territory where the lake is located was not yet surveyed as mentioned by Joseph Bouchette in his book “Description topographique du Bas-Canada”. He specifies that at least 12 townships around Lake Saint-François have not yet been surveyed and that the only details, verbal descriptions and drawings are approximate and come from Indian hunters and trappers who had crossed the territory which was still uninhabited; it specifies that there are two lakes connected by a river. Later, in 1917, the dam at the outlet of the lake will raise the level by 7 meters and increase the area to its present size.

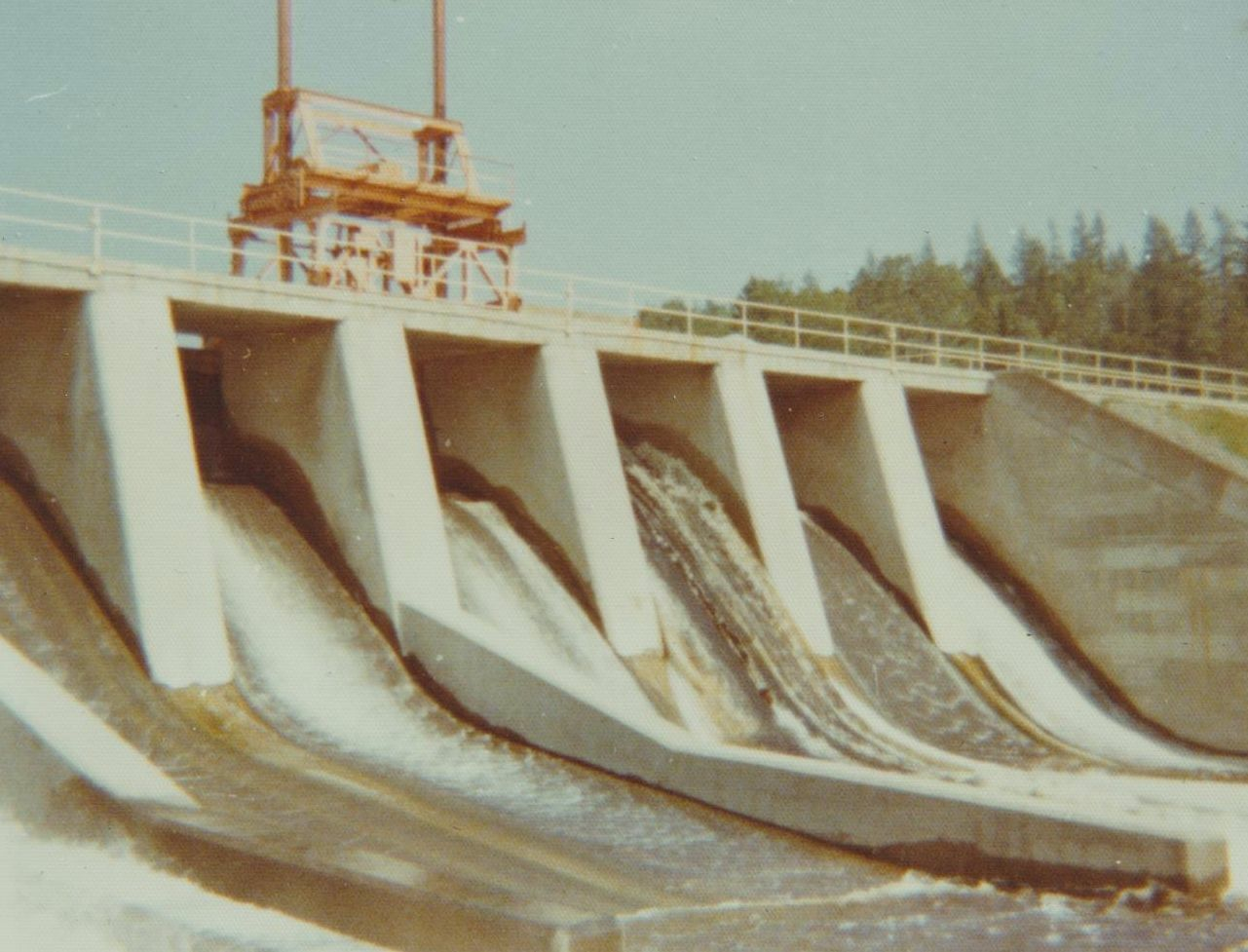
Barrage Jules-Allard at the large lake Saint-François in the 1980s. It is located in the municipality of Saint-Joseph-de-Coleraine. This dam has since been replaced. The St-François River begins here.

Petit lac Saint-François is located 1.5 km northwest of Grand lac Saint-François. Following the request of the riparian municipalities and in order to avoid confusion with other hydronyms using the name “Lac Saint-François”, on May 10, 2007, the name “Grand lac Saint-François” was changed. formalized by the Commission de toponymie du Québec replacing the designation "Lac Saint-François".

== See also ==
- Adstock, a municipality
- Lambton, a municipality
- Sainte-Praxède, a municipality
- Saint-Joseph-de-Coleraine, a municipality
- Saint-François River
- Les Appalaches Regional County Municipality (MRC)
- Felton River
- La Petite Rivière (Grand lac Saint François)
- Rivière aux Bluets (Grand lac Saint François)
- Petite rivière Muskrat
- Muskrat River (Grand lac Saint François)
- Rivière de l'Or
- Ashberham River
