= Sainte-Anne-du-Lac, Adstock, Quebec =

Coordinates: 46.0778°N 71.2028°W

Sainte-Anne-du-Lac (French pronunciation: [sɛ̃t an dy lak]) was a former village municipality in L'Amiante Regional County Municipality in the Chaudière-Appalaches region of Quebec. On October 24, 2001, it merged into the municipality of Adstock and ceased to exist.
