= Sacré-Cœur-de-Marie-Partie-Sud, Quebec =

Coordinates: 46°8′0″N 71°10′33″W

Sacré-Cœur-de-Marie-Partie-Sud (French pronunciation: [sakʁe kœʁ də maʁi paʁti syd]) was a former municipality in L'Amiante Regional County Municipality in the Chaudière-Appalaches region of Quebec.

It ceased to exist on February 14, 2001, when it merged with Saint-Méthode-de-Frontenac to form the new municipality of Adstock, Quebec.
