= Courcelles–Saint-Évariste =

- Municipality
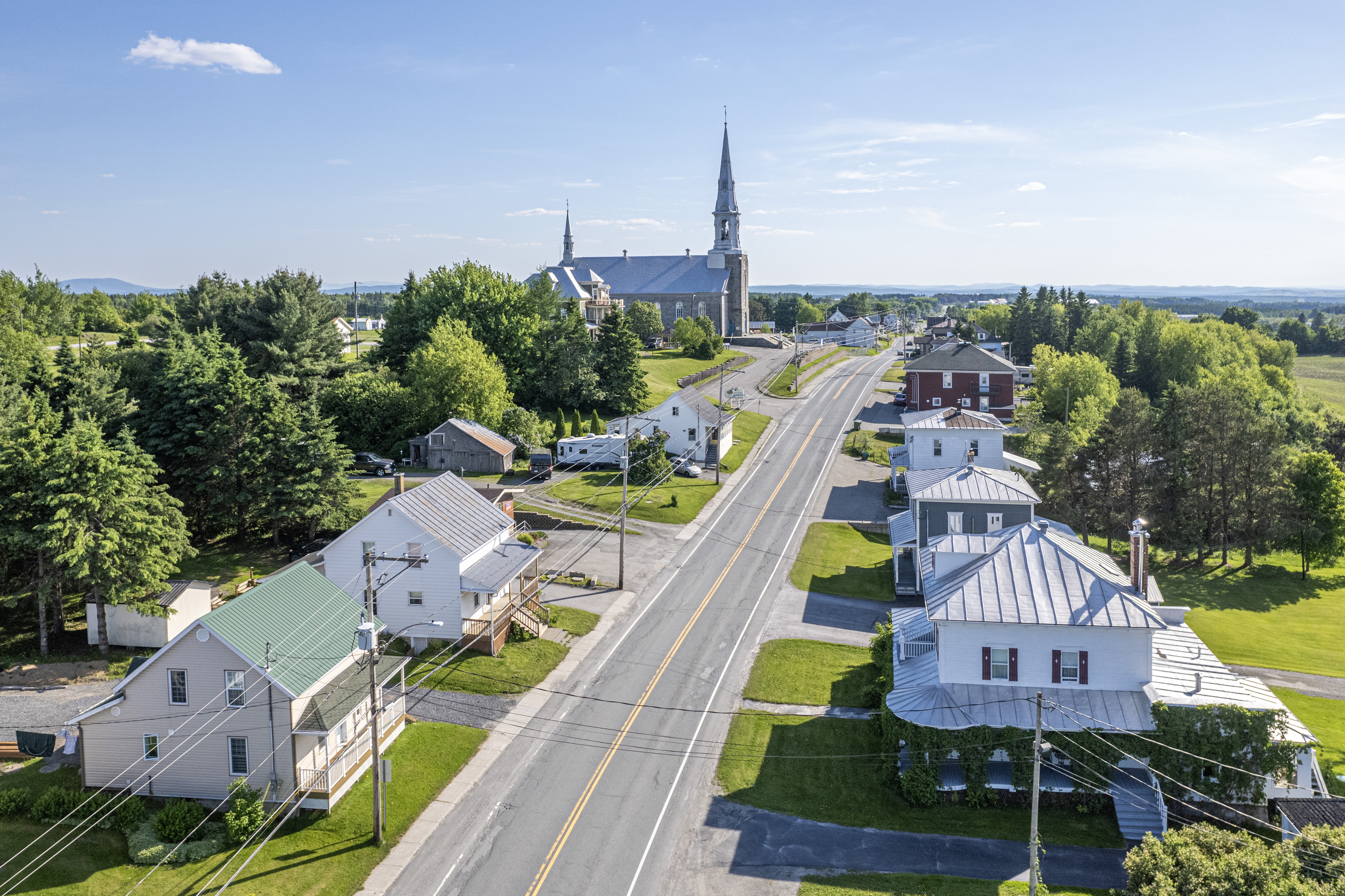
- Aerial view of Courcelles-Saint-Évariste

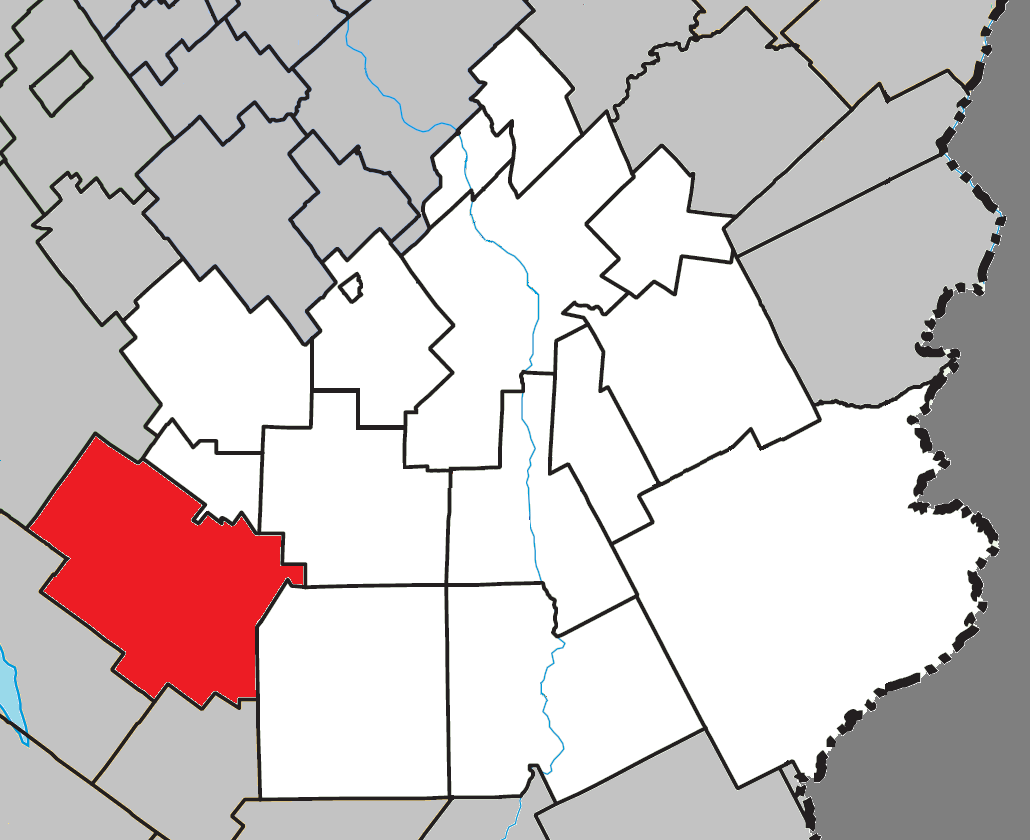
- Location within Beauce-Sartigan RCM.

- Location in southern Quebec
- Coordinates: 45°52′26″N 70°58′59″W
- Country: Canada
- Province: Quebec
- Region: Chaudière-Appalaches
- RCM: Beauce-Sartigan
- Constituted: January 1, 2024

Government
  - Mayor: Francis Bélanger
  - Federal riding: Mégantic—L'Érable—Lotbinière (Courcelles), Beauce (Saint-Évariste-de-Forsyth)
  - Prov. riding: Beauce-Sud

Area
  - Total: 203.5 km^{2} (78.6 sq mi)
  - Land: 201.19 km^{2} (77.68 sq mi)

Population (2021)
  - Total: 1,325
  - Density: 6.6/km^{2} (17/sq mi)
  - Pop 2016-2021: ▼3.1%
  - Dwellings: 741
- Time zone: UTC−5 (EST)
  - Summer (DST): UTC−4 (EDT)
- Postal code(s): G0M 1C0, G0M 1S0
- Area codes: 418 and 581
- Highways: R-108
- Website: www.muncste.ca

Courcelles–Saint-Évariste (French pronunciation: [kuʁsɛl sɛ̃t‿evaʁist]) is a municipality in Beauce-Sartigan Regional County Municipality in the Chaudière-Appalaches region in Quebec, Canada. It is approximately 105 km (65 mi) south of Quebec City. The population as of the Canada 2021 Census was 1,325.

Artist Carmen Coulombe was born in Courcelles-Saint-Évariste.

== History ==
The Municipality of Courcelles–Saint-Évaristee was founded on January 1, 2024, by the merger of the municipalities of Courcelles and Saint-Évariste-de-Forsyth.

== Geography ==
Coucelles–Saint-Évariste is the gateway to the Eastern Townships tourist region on Route 108 linking the Beauce to the Eastern Townships. But even more significantly, the municipality occupies the centre of the triangle formed by the three service towns of Thetford Mines to the north, Saint-Georges to the east and Lac-Mégantic to the south. Situated on a hill, the view from Courcelles-Saint-Évariste is impressive. You can see some of the surrounding mountains, such as Mont Adstock.

== Demographics ==
In the 2021 Census, Statistics Canada reported that Courcelles–Saint-Évariste had a population of 1,325 living in 621 of its 741 total dwellings, an -3.1% change from its 2016 population of 1,368.

Population trend:

| Census | Population | Change (%) |
|---|---|---|
| 2021 | 1,325 | ▼3.1% |
| 2016 | 1,368 | N/A |

Mother tongue language (2021)

| Language | Population | Pct (%) |
|---|---|---|
| French only | 1,260 | 95.5% |
| English only | 0 | 0.0% |
| Both English and French | 5 | 0.4% |
| Other languages | 55 | 4.2% |
