= Carmen Coulombe =

Canadian artist

Carmen Coulombe (1946 – January 24, 2008) was a Canadian artist.

Born in Courcelles, Quebec, Coulombe studied art at the École des Beaux-Arts in Quebec City until 1971. She became a certified teacher in 1972 while attending Laval University. Known mostly for her small-scale prints and drawings, she exhibited mostly in Montreal, but she came to wider attention in the early 1980s due to her participation in a group show of feminist art. In 1972 she was among the artists who cofounded the print workshop Engramme; she was the first to have a solo exhibit there.

Her work is included in the collection of the Musée national des beaux-arts du Québec.
