= Frontenac National Park =

National park of Quebec, Canada

- IUCN category II (national park)
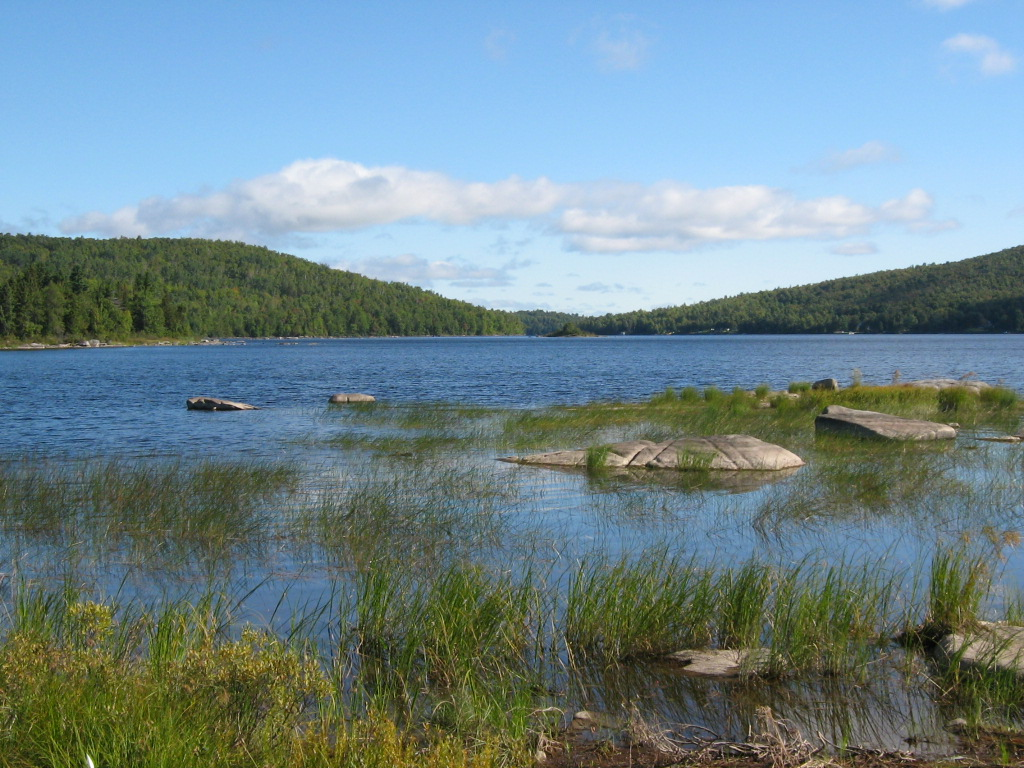
- Interactive map of Frontenac National Park
- Location: Les Appalaches and Le Granit RCMs, Quebec, Canada
- Nearest city: Thetford Mines
- Coordinates: 45°52′00″N 71°13′00″W
- Area: 155.30 km^{2} (59.96 sq mi)
- Established: August 6, 1987
- Governing body: SEPAQ

Frontenac National Park (French: Parc national de Frontenac) is a 156.5 km^{2} provincial park in southeastern Quebec, Canada, created in 1987 and governed by Société des établissements de plein air du Québec. The park is located along Lac Saint-François roughly halfway between Quebec City and Sherbrooke. The nearest city is Thetford Mines.

== See also ==
- National Parks of Canada
- List of National Parks of Canada
- List of Quebec national parks
