= Lambton, Quebec =

Lambton
- Municipality
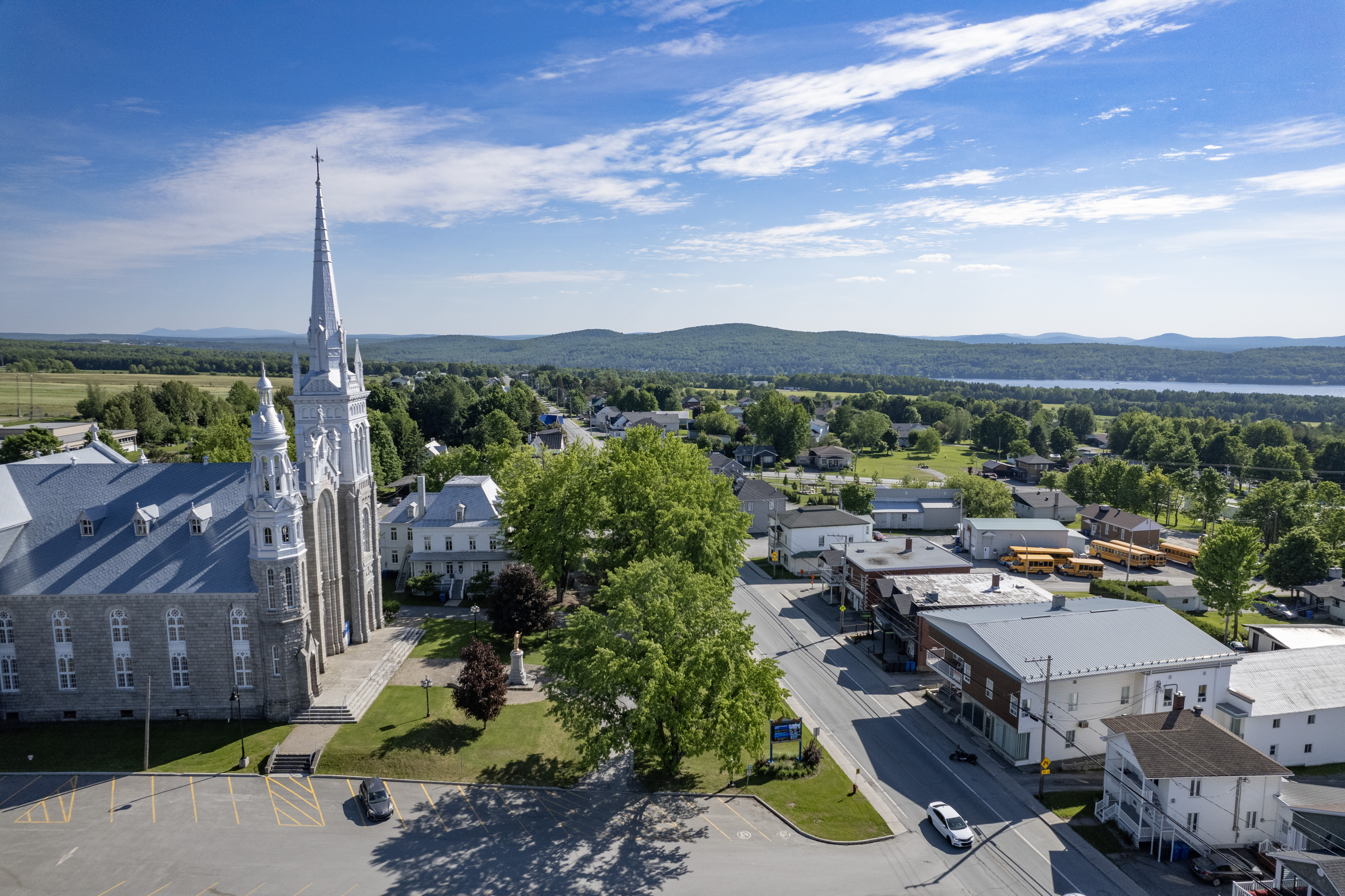
- Motto(s): Le jour viendra (French) "The day will come"
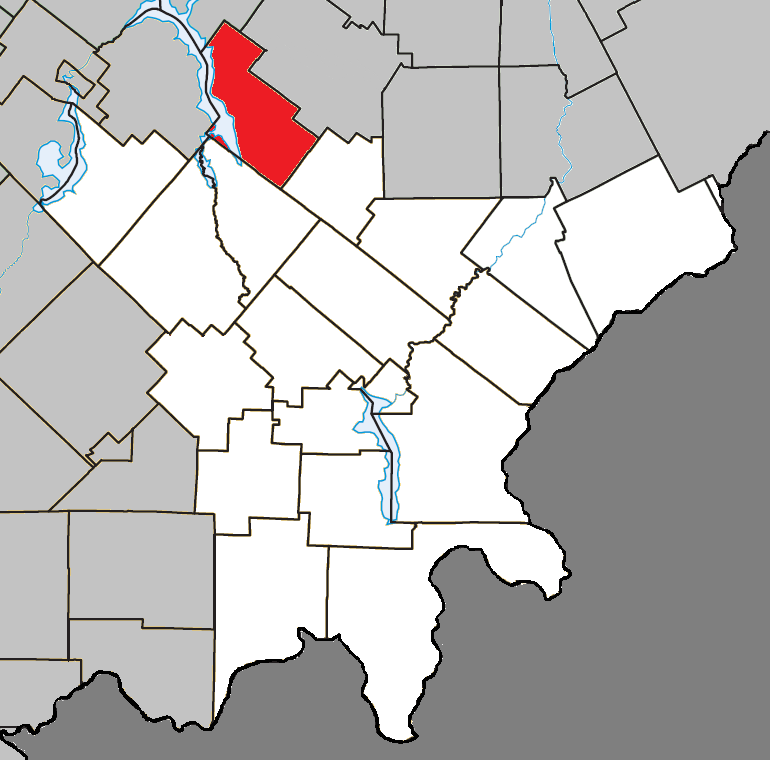
- Location within Le Granit RCM

- Location in southern Quebec
- Coordinates: 45°50′N 71°05′W
- Country: Canada
- Province: Quebec
- Region: Estrie
- RCM: Le Granit
- Constituted: December 23, 1976

Government
  - Mayor: Pierre Lemay
  - Federal riding: Mégantic—L'Érable—Lotbinière
  - Prov. riding: Mégantic

Area
  - Total: 124.70 km^{2} (48.15 sq mi)
  - Land: 108.45 km^{2} (41.87 sq mi)

Population (2021)
  - Total: 1,630
  - Density: 15/km^{2} (39/sq mi)
  - Pop 2016-2021: ▲0.8%
  - Dwellings: 1,143
- Time zone: UTC−5 (EST)
  - Summer (DST): UTC−4 (EDT)
- Postal code(s): G0M 1H0
- Area codes: 418 and 581
- Highways: R-108; R-263; A-10 (possible); A-65 (possible)
- Website: www.lambton.ca

Lambton is a municipality of about 1600 people in Le Granit Regional County Municipality in the Estrie region of Quebec, Canada. The municipality, constituted in 1976, covers an area of 108 km^{2}, with a population density of 15.

Lambton is mostly rural and agricultural area with some business on the two main roads in town.

== History ==
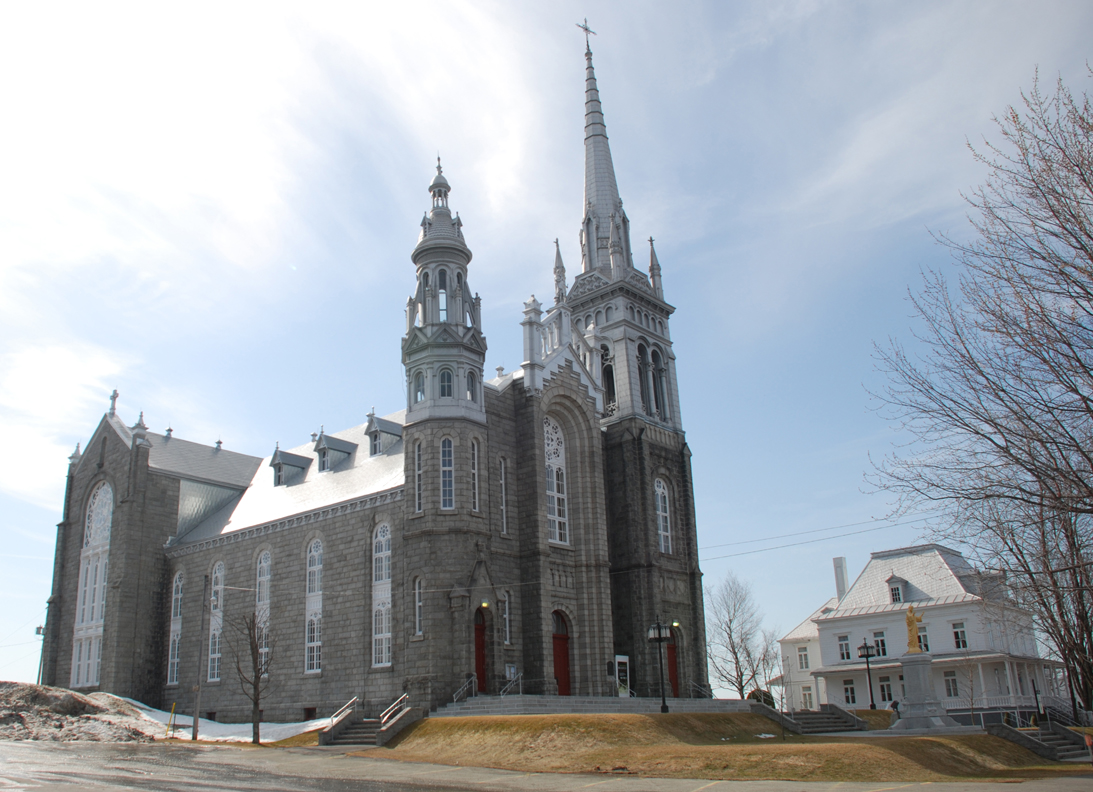
Saint-Vital Church

In 1855, the township of Lambton was created, while a Catholic mission, the future parish of Saint-Vital-de-Lambton, had already opened its registers in 1844. The current Saint-Vital Church in Lambton was built between 1905 and 1907. The village of Lambton, located on the eastern shore of Grand lac Saint François, was first incorporated as a municipality in 1913. Then, in 1976, a new municipality retaining the name Lambton was established from the merger of the village and the township.

== Infrastructure ==
The main roads connecting Lambton are Route 108 and Route 263.
