= Adstock, Quebec =

Adstock
- Municipality
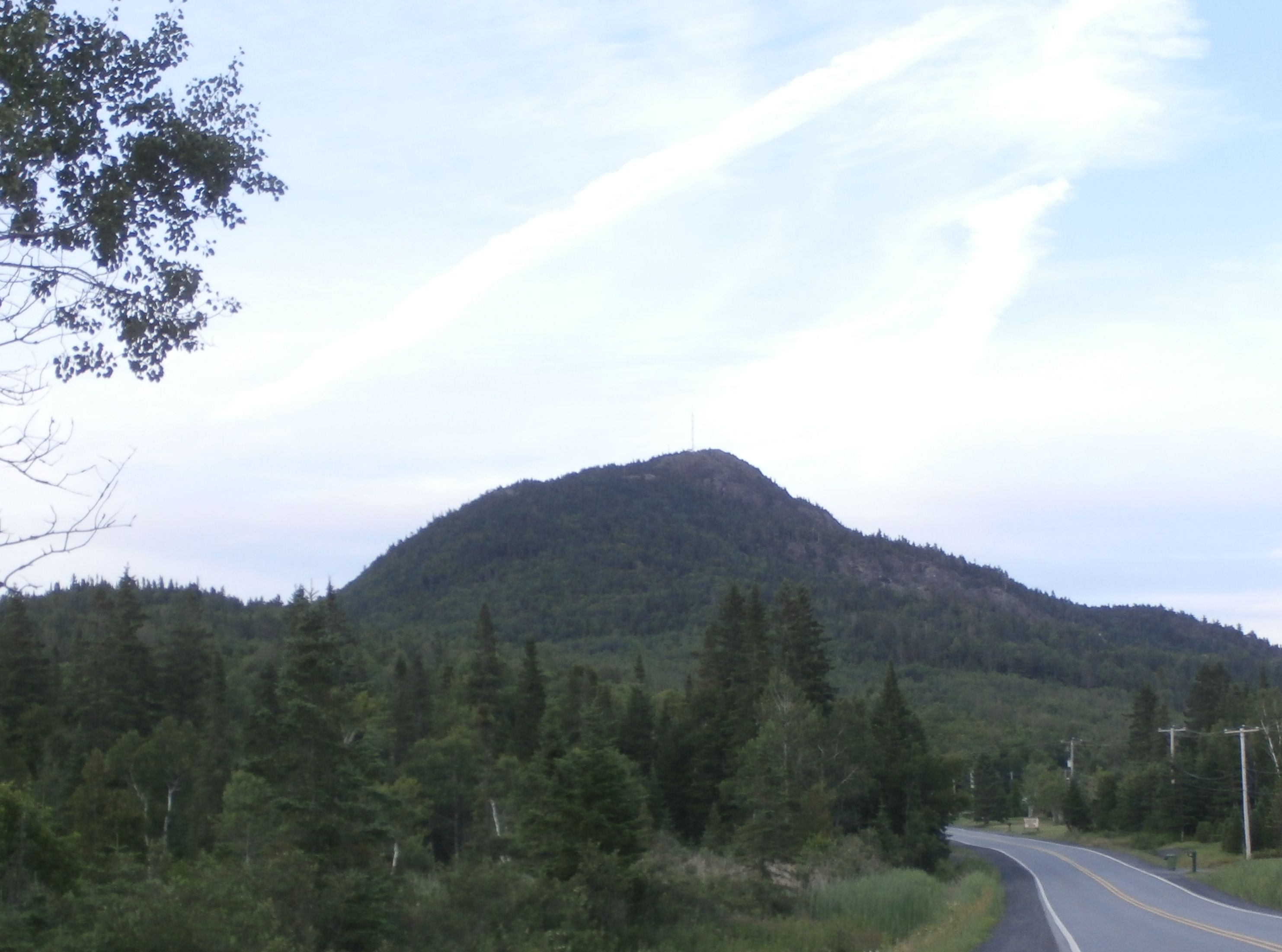
- Mont Adstock

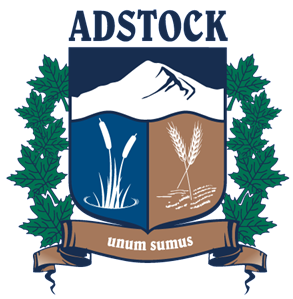
- Coat of arms
- Motto: Unum sumus (We are one)
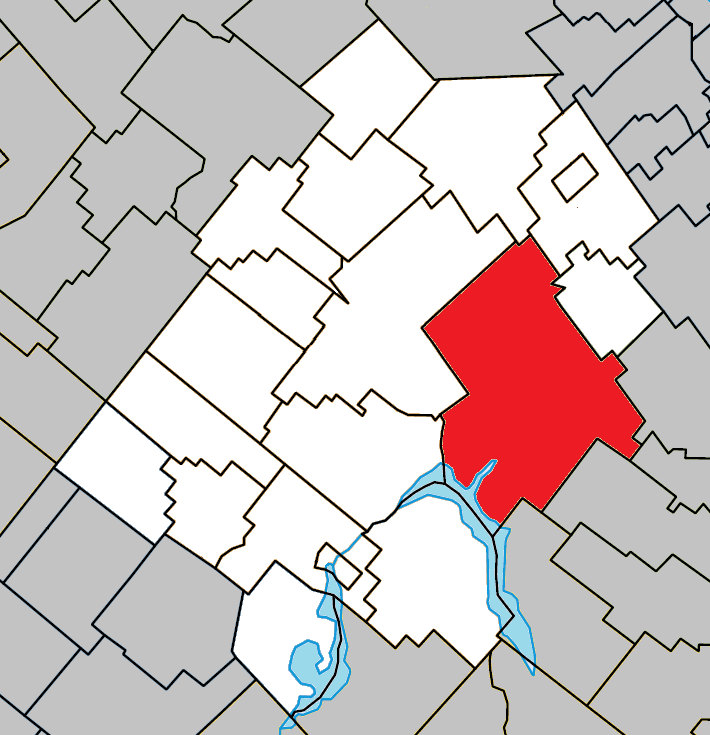
- Location within Les Appalaches RCM

- Location in province of Quebec
- Coordinates: 46°03′N 71°05′W
- Country: Canada
- Province: Quebec
- Region: Chaudière-Appalaches
- RCM: Les Appalaches
- Constituted: October 24, 2001
- Named for: Adstock

Government
  - Mayor: Pascal Binet
  - Federal riding: Mégantic—L'Érable—Lotbinière
  - Prov. riding: Lotbinière-Frontenac

Area
  - Total: 306.19 km^{2} (118.22 sq mi)
  - Land: 290.03 km^{2} (111.98 sq mi)

Population (2021)
  - Total: 2,903
  - Density: 10/km^{2} (26/sq mi)
  - Pop 2016–2021: ▲3.5%
  - Dwellings: 1,767
- Time zone: UTC−5 (EST)
  - Summer (DST): UTC−4 (EDT)
- Postal code(s): G0N 1S0
- Area codes: 418 and 581
- Highways: R-267; R-269
- Website: www.adstock.ca

Adstock is a municipality in the Les Appalaches Regional County Municipality in the Chaudière-Appalaches region of Quebec, Canada. Its population in the Canada 2021 Census was 2,903.

Adstock was created on February 14, 2001, after the amalgamation of Saint-Méthode-de-Frontenac and Sacré-Coeur-de-Marie-Partie-Sud. On October 24, 2001, Sainte-Anne-du-Lac joined the new municipality.

Adstock was named after the township in which the former municipality of Saint-Méthode-de-Frontenac lies. The township was itself named after the village of Adstock in Buckinghamshire, England.

== Economy ==
The Saint-Méthode bakery, a family business founded in 1947, is located within the municipality. In 2014, Benoît Faucher was the sole shareholder of the Faucher family in the business.

Seventy years after it opened, under Benoît Faucher's leadership, the bakery eliminated genetically modified organisms (GMOs) from all its products. In 2017, the Saint-Méthode bakery factory in Adstock suffered a major fire.

Subsequently, in 2023, Boulangerie Saint-Méthode acquired a new business partner: the American private equity firm Swander Pace Capital, which specialises in consumer goods. In addition, the family business plays an important role in the sliced bread trade, as in 2024 it is the second largest bakery in Quebec with a turnover of 125 million.

By 2025, the company was distributing bread almost everywhere in Quebec, from Ottawa to the Acadian Peninsula.

== Government ==
List of mayors

From	To	Name	Party	Position
16 June 2002	1 November 2009	Hélène Faucher		
1 November 2009	3 November 2013	René Gosselin		
3 November 2013		Pascal Binet		
