= Saint-Joseph-de-Coleraine =

- Municipality
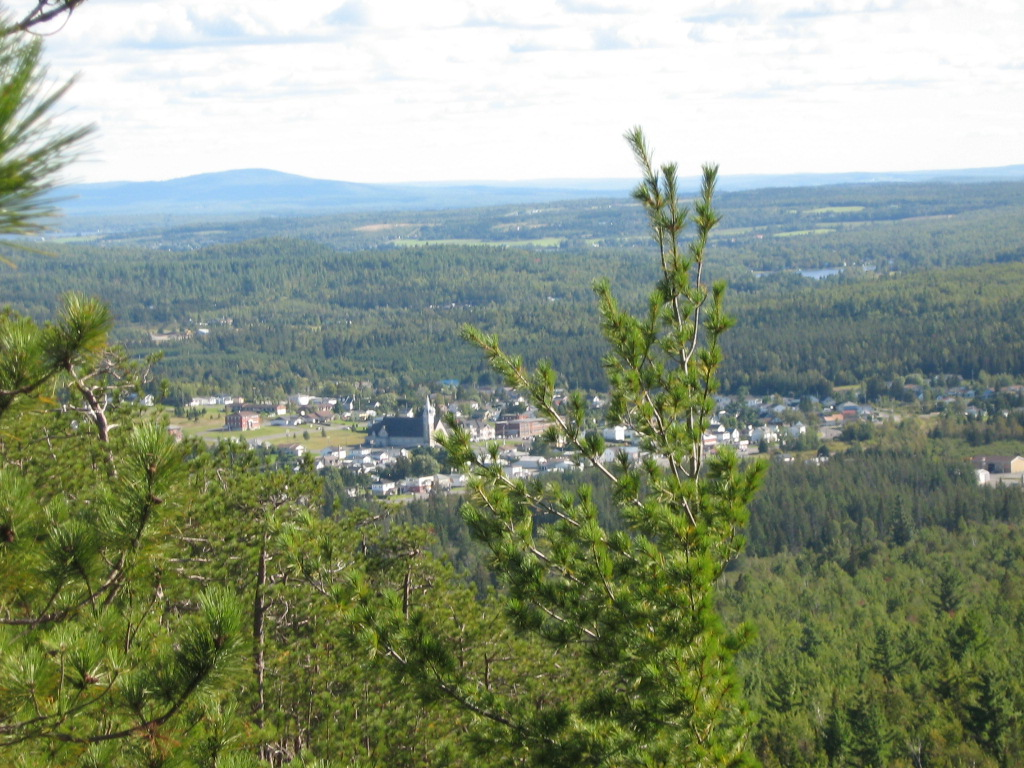

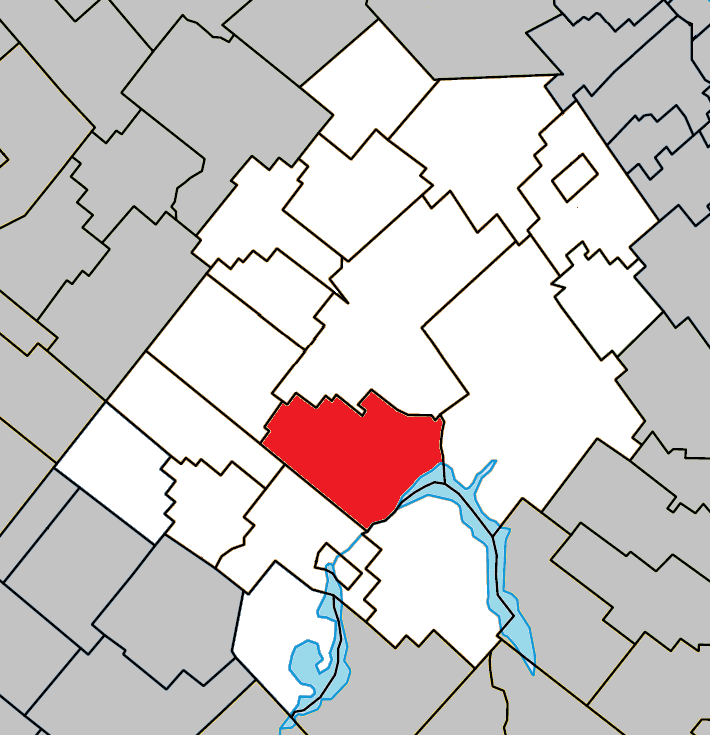
- Location within Les Appalaches RCM

- Location in province of Quebec
- Coordinates: 45°58′N 71°22′W
- Country: Canada
- Province: Quebec
- Region: Chaudière-Appalaches
- RCM: Les Appalaches
- Constituted: November 11, 1891

Government
  - Mayor: Nathalie Vachon
  - Federal riding: Mégantic—L'Érable—Lotbinière
  - Prov. riding: Lotbinière-Frontenac

Area
  - Total: 134.50 km^{2} (51.93 sq mi)
  - Land: 126.76 km^{2} (48.94 sq mi)

Population (2021)
  - Total: 1,820
  - Density: 14.4/km^{2} (37/sq mi)
  - Pop 2016-2021: ▲3.3%
  - Dwellings: 1,124
- Time zone: UTC−5 (EST)
  - Summer (DST): UTC−4 (EDT)
- Postal code(s): G0N 1B0
- Area codes: 418 and 581
- Highways: R-112; R-267
- Website: www.coleraine.qc.ca

Saint-Joseph-de-Coleraine (French pronunciation: [sɛ̃ ʒozɛf də kɔlʁɛn]) is a municipality in the Municipalité régionale de comté des Appalaches in Quebec, Canada. It is part of the Chaudière-Appalaches region and the population is 1,820 as of 2019. It is named after Saint Joseph, father of Jesus, and the town of Coleraine in County Londonderry, Northern Ireland.

== Demographics ==
In the 2021 Census of Population conducted by Statistics Canada, Saint-Joseph-de-Coleraine had a population of 1,820 living in 866 of its 1,124 total private dwellings, a change of 3.3% from its 2016 population of 1,762. With a land area of 126.76 km^{2} (48.94 sq mi), it had a population density of 14.4/km^{2} (37.2/sq mi) in 2021.
