= Adstock =

Village in Buckinghamshire, England

Coordinates: 51.965°N 0.926°W

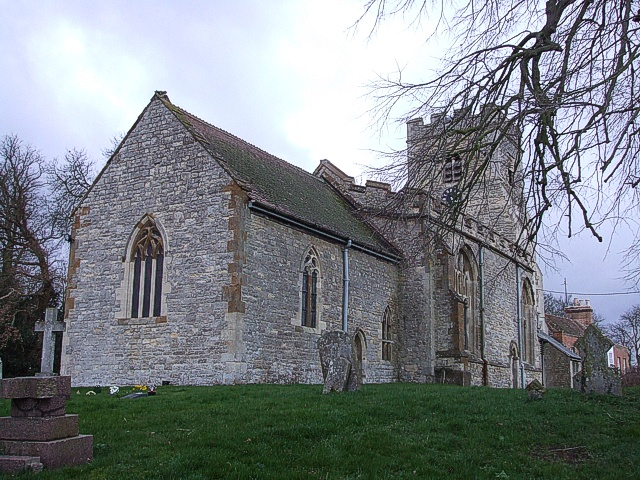
- St. Cecilia's parish church

- Location within Buckinghamshire
- Population: 363 (2011 Census)
- OS grid reference: SP7330
- Civil parish: Adstock
- Unitary authority: Buckinghamshire
- Ceremonial county: Buckinghamshire
- Region: South East
- Country: England
- Sovereign state: United Kingdom
- Post town: Buckingham
- Postcode district: MK18
- Dialling code: 01296
- Police: Thames Valley
- Fire: Buckinghamshire
- Ambulance: South Central
- UK Parliament: Buckingham and Bletchley

Adstock is a village and civil parish about 2.5 miles (4.0 km) northwest of Winslow and 3 miles (4.8 km) southeast of Buckingham, in the Buckinghamshire unitary district of England. The 2001 Census recorded a parish population of 415 reducing to 363 at the 2011 Census.

There are remains of a Roman road in the village.

In the divisions of England that took place between AD 613 and 1017, Buckinghamshire was divided into eight hundreds. The manor of Adstock originally formed part of the Votesdune Hundred, then merged into the Ashendon Hundred and was finally absorbed into the Buckingham Hundred. At that time it was surrounded by the Bernwood, one of the most important Royal Forests. At the end of the 10th century, Adstock formed a portion of the Lands of Godwine, Earl of Kent and his second wife Gytha Thorkelsdóttir.

After the Norman conquest of England, its name was recorded in the Domesday Book of 1086 as Edestoche which is Old English and means Eadda's Farm. Nearby Addington was named after the same person.

In the mid to late 11th century the manor of Adstock was given by William the Conqueror to his illegitimate son William Peverel, who was listed as its owner in 1086. This suggests that the manor was of some value, or that its previous owner was of some prominence in Anglo Saxon society.

The village received a charter to establish itself as a town briefly in 1665 so that a market could be held there. This was due to the majority of the people of the two local towns of Winslow and Buckingham being infected with bubonic plague. The charter was removed, however, in 1685 and Adstock was reinstated as a village rather than a town.

The parish church, which dates from the 12th century, is dedicated to St Cecilia. The roof is dated 1597, and the church underwent further major restoration during the Victorian era. There are two bells (the lightest of which dates back from about 1440) in the church and one Sanctus

Adstock had an outstation from the Bletchley Park codebreaking establishment, where some of the Bombes used to decode German Enigma messages in World War Two were located.
