= Saint-François River =

Saint-François River Rivière Saint-François (fr)
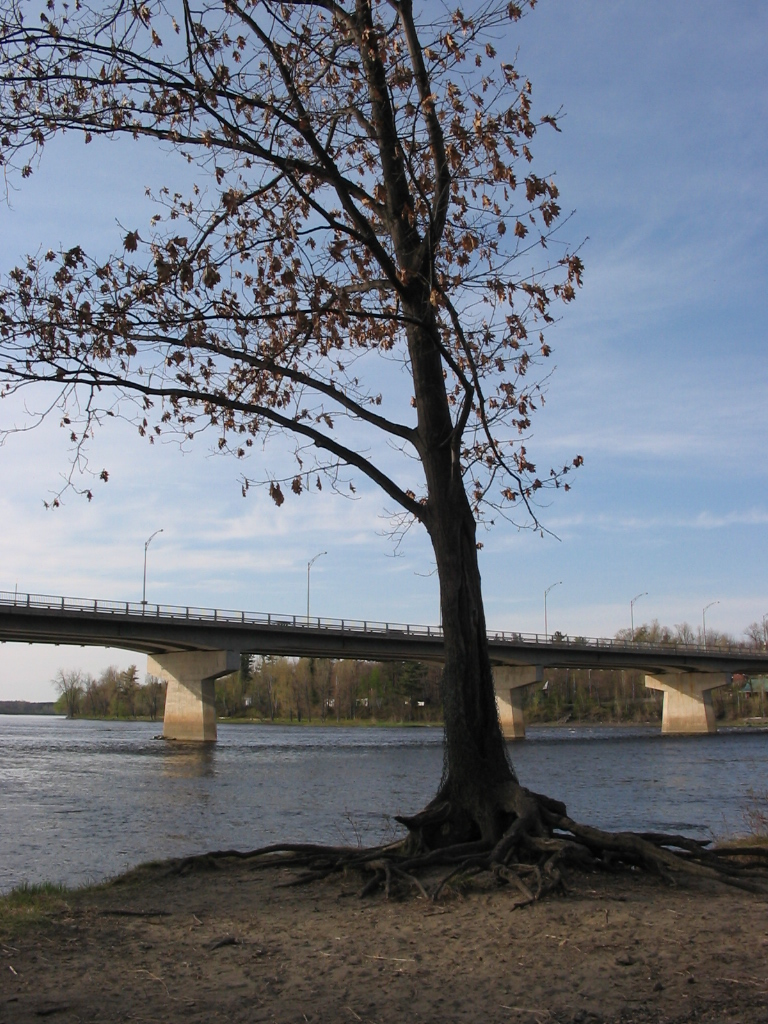
- A tree on the banks of the Saint-François River in Drummondville

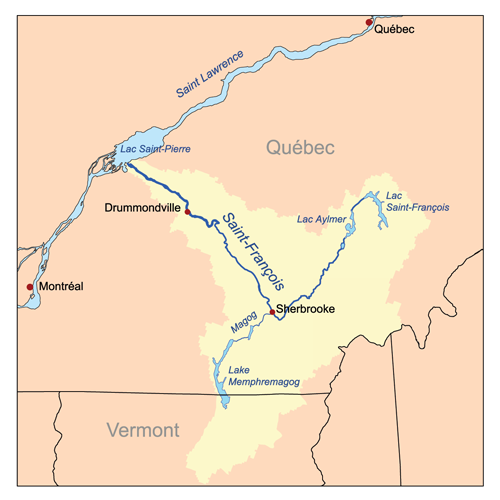
- Map of the Saint-François River watershed
- Native name: Alsigôntekw (Western Abnaki)

Location
- Country: Canada
- Province: Quebec
- Region: Estrie, Chaudière-Appalaches, Centre-du-Québec
- Cities: Sherbrooke, Drummondville

Physical characteristics
- Source: Lac Saint-François
  - location: Lambton, Estrie, Quebec, Canada
  - coordinates: 45°53′55″N 71°09′28″W
  - elevation: 289 m (948 ft)
- Mouth
  - location: Pierreville, Centre-du-Québec, Quebec, Canada
  - coordinates: 46°07′09″N 72°55′28″W
- Length: 218 km (135 mi)
- Basin size: 10,230 km^{2} (3,950 sq mi)
- Discharge
  - location: Lac Saint-Pierre
- Discharge
  - location: Drummondville
  - average: 190 m^{3}/s (6,700 cu ft/s)

Basin features
- Tributaries
  - left: Magog River

The Saint-François River (French: Rivière Saint-François, pronounced [ʁivjɛʁ sɛ̃ fʁɑ̃swa]) is a right tributary of the St. Lawrence River in Quebec, Canada.

Its source is Lake Saint-François in Chaudière-Appalaches, southeast of Thetford Mines. It flows southwest towards Sherbrooke, where it changes course northwest towards Drummondville, and finally empties into the Saint Lawrence River near Pierreville. Its total length is 218 km.

== Etymology ==
The river was named by French Jesuit missionaries after Saint Francis Xavier (1506–1552), who explored the region under the French regime, and after François de Lauzon.

== Geography ==
Its course is unusual, as it flows from northeast to southwest to branch off, halfway through, and continue its course from southeast to northwest.

The Saint-François River has its origins in the lake Saint-François and heads southwest toward Sherbrooke. Along the way, it crosses Lake Aylmer and Lake Louise, and passes through many municipalities.

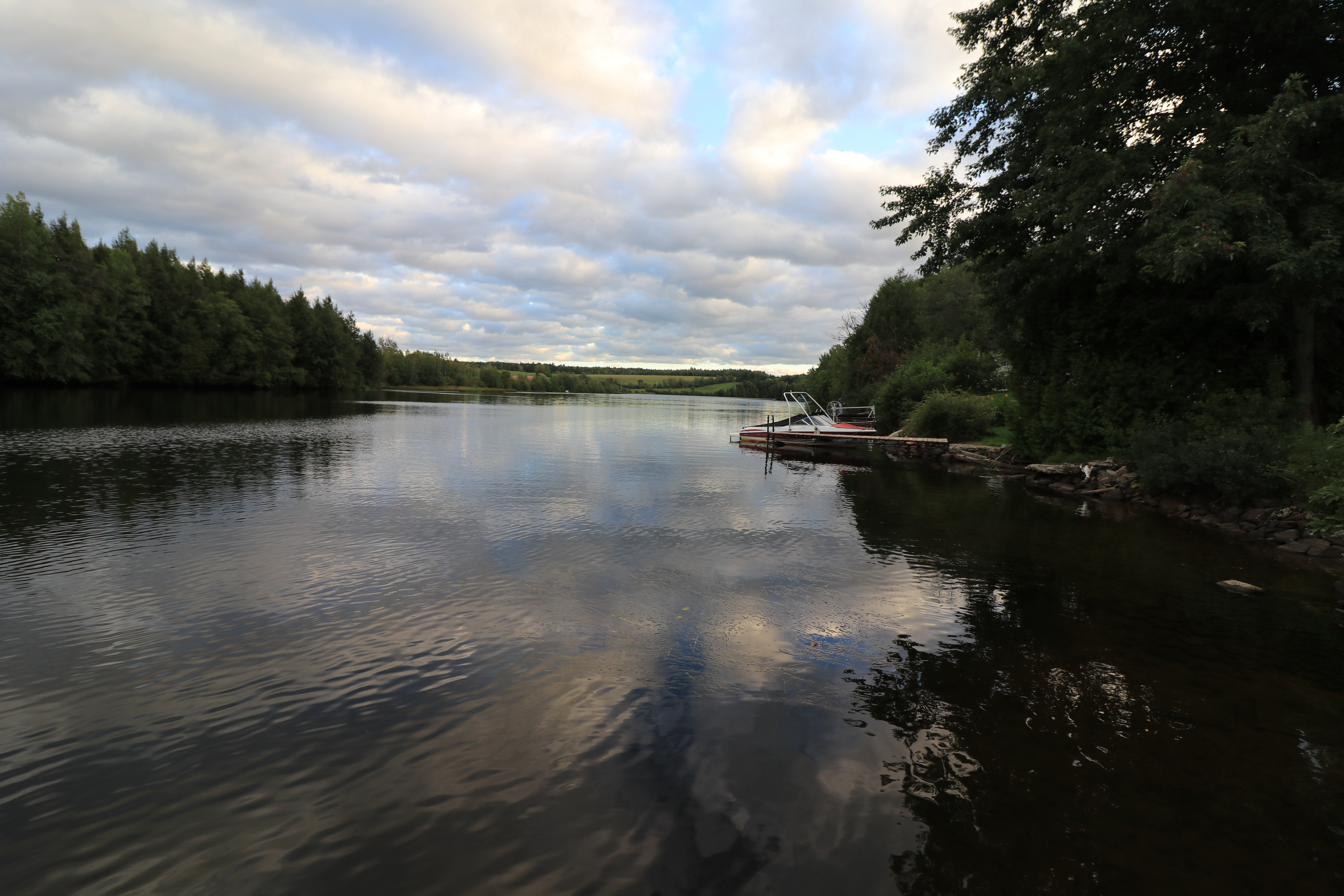
Rivière Saint-François at Dudswell, QC

In Sherbrooke, it receives the waters of the Massawippi River and the Magog River basins. It continues north-west, passing through the municipalities of Windsor, Richmond, and Drummondville. From there it flows into the Saint Lawrence River at lake Saint-Pierre.

== History ==
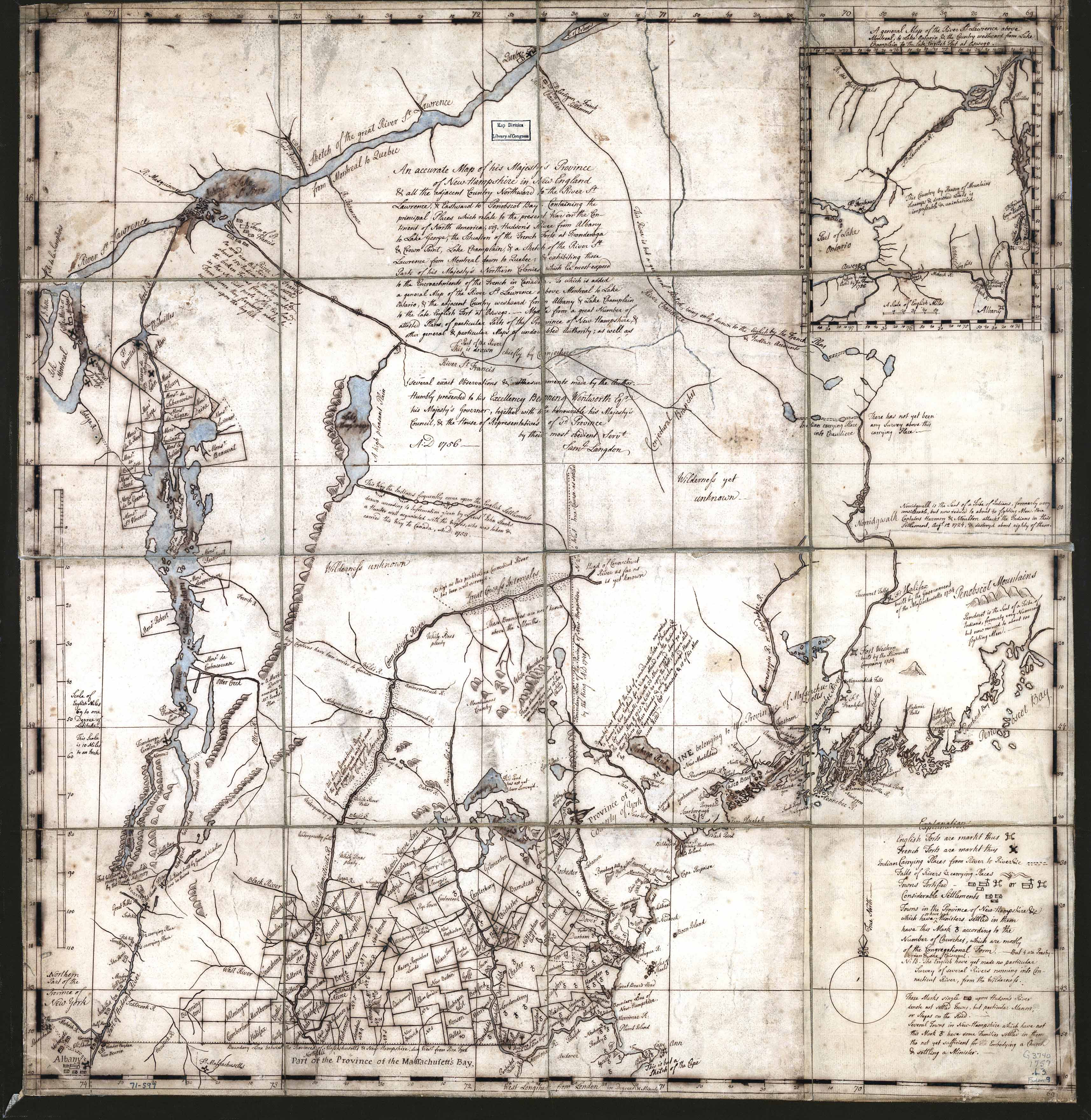
Map 1756 Blanchard & Langdon 1m

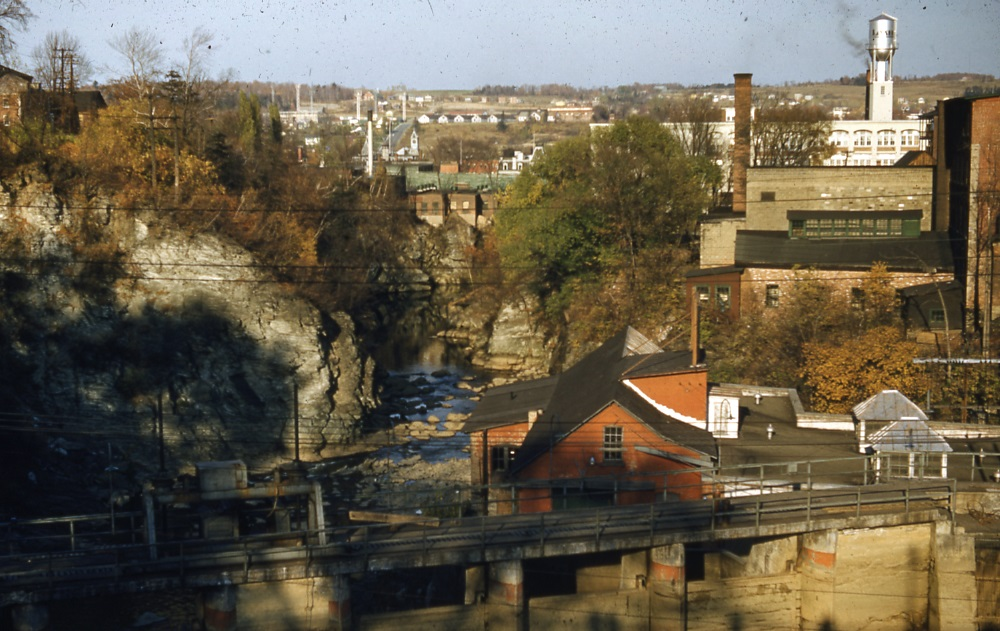
The Saint-François river at Sherbrooke in the 1950s

The river has long been traveled by Native Americans; particularly the Abenakis. The Indian Reservation of Odanak, which today has a population of about 400, has existed since 1670. The Fort Crevier was also built in 1687 by the river. A temporary Jesuit mission was established at Coös for the Abenaki living in the Connecticut River valley or near the Kennebec River. When the Abenaki mission Saint-François-de-Sales located on the Chaudière River moved to Odanak, the village took the latter's name, "Saint-François”. Odanak is located on the banks of the Saint-François River, about 10 kilometers east of lake Saint-Pierre. In 1805, an 8,000 acre reserve (32.4 kilometres (20.13 mi)) was granted for Indian refugees in Durham Township, near the present village of L'Avenir, as well as 2,722 acres (1,102 ha) (11 kilometres (6.84 mi)) in 1853 on the shore of Petit Lac Saint-François in the township of Coleraine.

== See also ==
- Grand lac Saint François
- Lake Saint-François
- Lake Aylmer
- Lake Saint-Pierre
- List of rivers of Quebec
