= Rivière au Pin =

River in Quebec, Canada

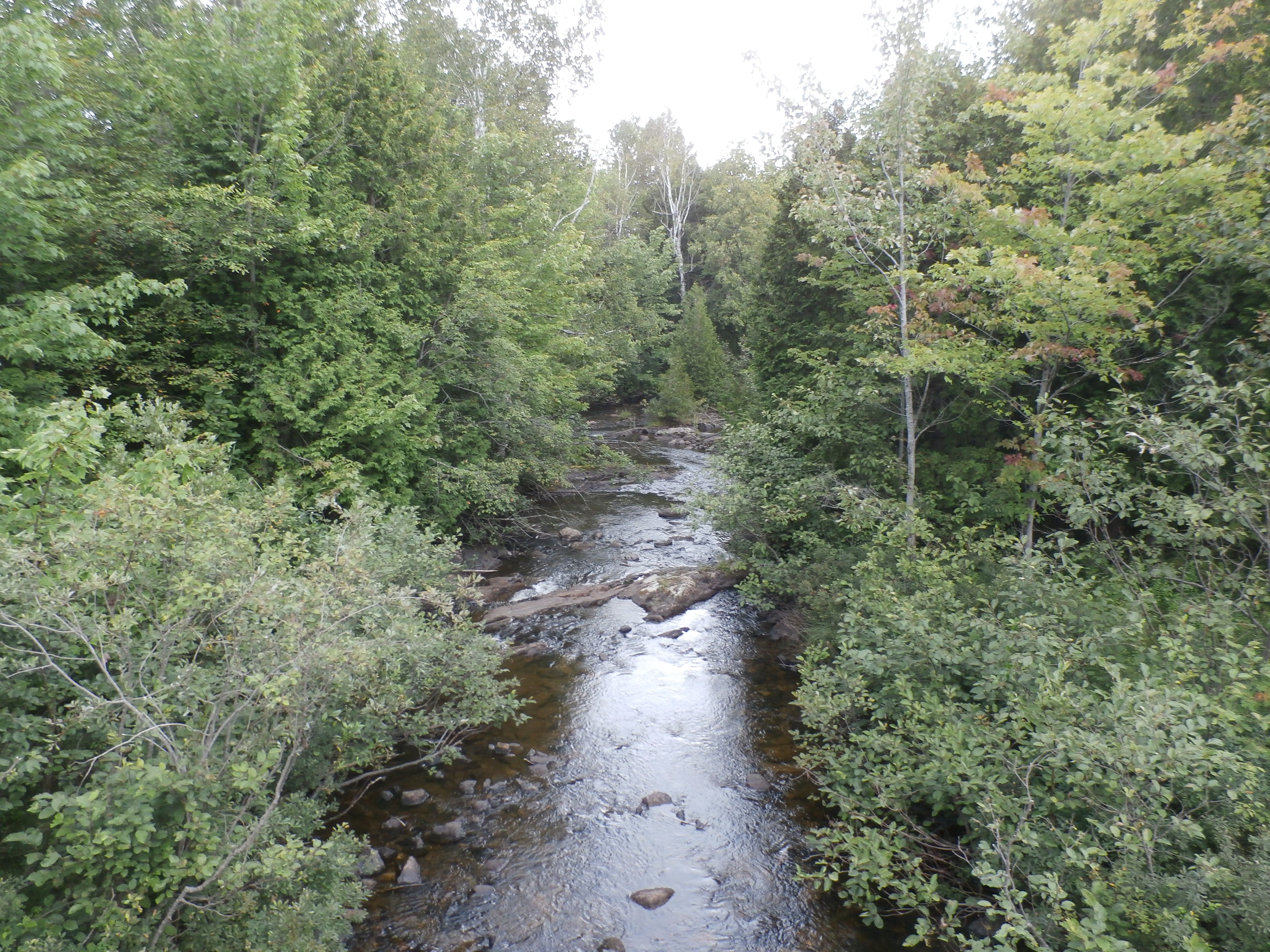

Location
- Country: Canada
- Province: Quebec
- Region: Centre-du-Quebec, Chaudière-Appalaches
- MRC: Arthabaska Regional County Municipality, Les Appalaches Regional County Municipality

Physical characteristics
- Source: Sunday Lake
  - location: Saints-Martyrs-Canadiens
  - coordinates: 45.89499°N 71.483005°W
  - elevation: 368 m (1,207 ft)
- Mouth: Bécancour River
  - location: Irlande
  - coordinates: 46.05833°N 71.47556°W
  - elevation: 194 m (636 ft)
- Length: 31.0 km (19.3 mi)

Basin features
- Progression: Bécancour River, St. Lawrence River
- Tributaries
  - left: (upstream) ruisseau Simon, ruisseau Kerwin, ruisseau Amadon, Blanche River (rivière au Pin tributary)
  - right: (upstream) ruisseau Vimy, décharge du lac de l'Est

The rivière au Pin (in English: Pine River) is a tributary of the Bécancour River which is a tributary of the south shore of the St. Lawrence River, in Quebec, in Canada.

The Pin River flows successively, in the MRC of:

- Arthabaska Regional County Municipality, in administrative region of Centre-du-Québec: in the municipalities of Saints-Martyrs-Canadiens;
- Les Appalaches Regional County Municipality (MRC), in the administrative region of Chaudière-Appalaches: municipalities of Saint-Jacques-le- Majeur-de-Wolfestown, Disraeli (parish), Saint-Jacques-le-Majeur-de-Wolfestown, Saint-Julien and Irlande.

== Geography ==
The main neighboring watersheds of the rivière au Pin are:

- north side: Bécancour River, William Lake;
- east side: Bécancour River, Lac à la Truite, Coleraine River;
- south side: Coulombe North River;
- west side: Blanche River (rivière au Pin tributary), Nicolet River, rivière des Vases, Grimard stream, Bulstrode River.

The rivière au Pin has its source at Sunday Lake (length: 2.5 kilometres (1.6 mi); altitude: 367 metres (1,204 ft)) in the municipality of Saints-Martyrs-Canadiens. This lake is located north of Mont Louise (Arthabaska), northeast of the village of Saints-Martyrs-Canadiens, north of route 161 and south of Saint-Jacques-le-Majeur-de-Wolfestown.

From Sunday Lake, the Pin River flows on 31.0 kilometres (19.3 mi) divided into the following segments:

Upper course of the Pin River (segment of 12.7 kilometres (7.9 mi))

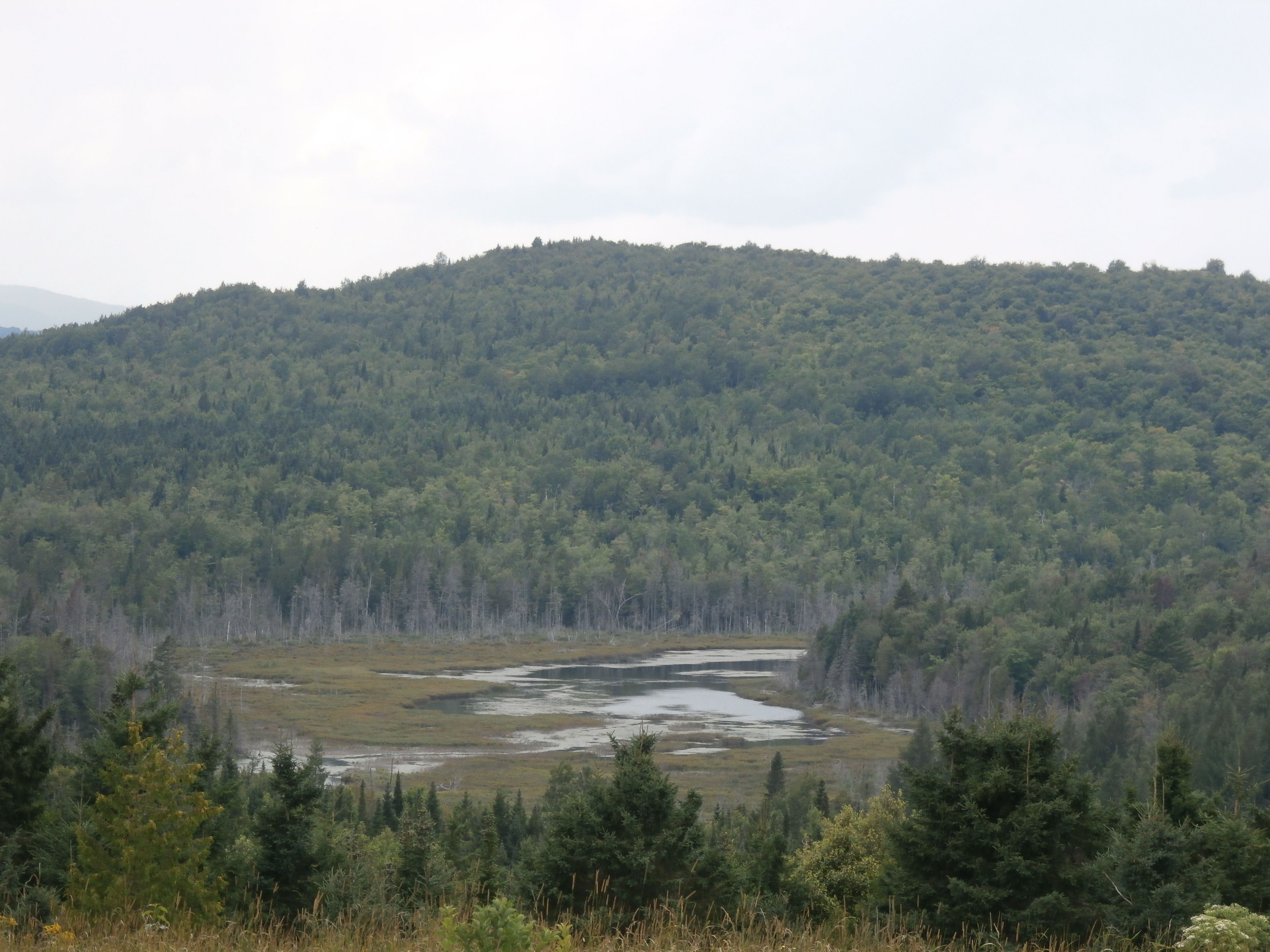
Mud Pond; marsh crossed by the Pine River between Lac Breeches and Petit Lac Long.

- 0.9 kilometres (0.56 mi) towards the northeast, crossing Breeches Lake, crossing the boundary between the municipalities of Saints-Martyrs-Canadiens and Saint-Jacques-le-Majeur-de-Wolfestown, to the southwest shore of Lake Breeches (altitude: 355 metres (1,165 ft));
- 3.3 kilometres (2.1 mi) northeasterly, to its mouth located northeast of the lake;
- 2.2 kilometres (1.4 mi) towards the north, crossing the boundary between the municipalities of Saint-Jacques-le-Majeur-de-Wolfestown and Disraeli, Quebec (city), to the mouth of the "Mud Pond" (length: 0.6 kilometres (0.37 mi); altitude: 346 metres (1,135 ft)) which the current has crossed over its full length;
- 1.1 kilometres (0.68 mi) northward, to the mouth of Petit lac Long (length: 0.7 kilometres (0.43 mi); altitude: 334 metres (1,096 ft));
- 2.4 kilometres (1.5 mi) towards the northeast, up to the limit between the municipalities of Disraeli and Saint-Jacques-le-Majeur-de-Wolfestown;
- 2.8 kilometres (1.7 mi) northerly, to the limit between the municipalities of Saint-Jacques-le-Majeur-de-Wolfestown and Saint-Julien.

Lower course of the Pin River (segment of 183 kilometres (114 mi))

From this municipal limit, the Rivière au Pin flows over:

- 2.7 kilometres (1.7 mi) north to a road bridge;
- 1.9 kilometres (1.2 mi) northward, to the confluence of Vimy Creek (coming from the north);
- 4.1 kilometres (2.5 mi) westward, up to the confluence of the Blanche River (coming from the west);
- 1.3 kilometres (0.81 mi) northward, up to the municipal boundary between Saint-Julien and Irlande;
- 3.8 kilometres (2.4 mi) north to the road;
- 4.5 kilometres (2.8 mi) (or 3.1 kilometres (1.9 mi) in a direct line) towards the north, winding in a marsh area, until its confluence.

The Rivière au Pin flows into a bend in the river on the south bank of the Bécancour River. This confluence is located in a marsh area, at 1.5 kilometres (0.93 mi) upstream of the Stater Pond (which the Bécancour River partly crosses), at 1.5 kilometres (0.93 mi) southwest of Cranberry hamlet and 1.7 kilometres (1.1 mi) east of the summit of Mont Dillon.

== Toponymy ==
Logging, in particular the essence of pine, contributed to the colonization of the region of Appalachians.

The Rivière aux Pins appears on an 1883 cadastral map of the canton of Ireland.

The toponym Rivière au Pin was made official on December 5, 1968, at the Commission de toponymie du Québec.

== See also ==
- List of rivers of Quebec
