= Coulombe River =

River in Estrie, Quebec (Canada)

Colombe River
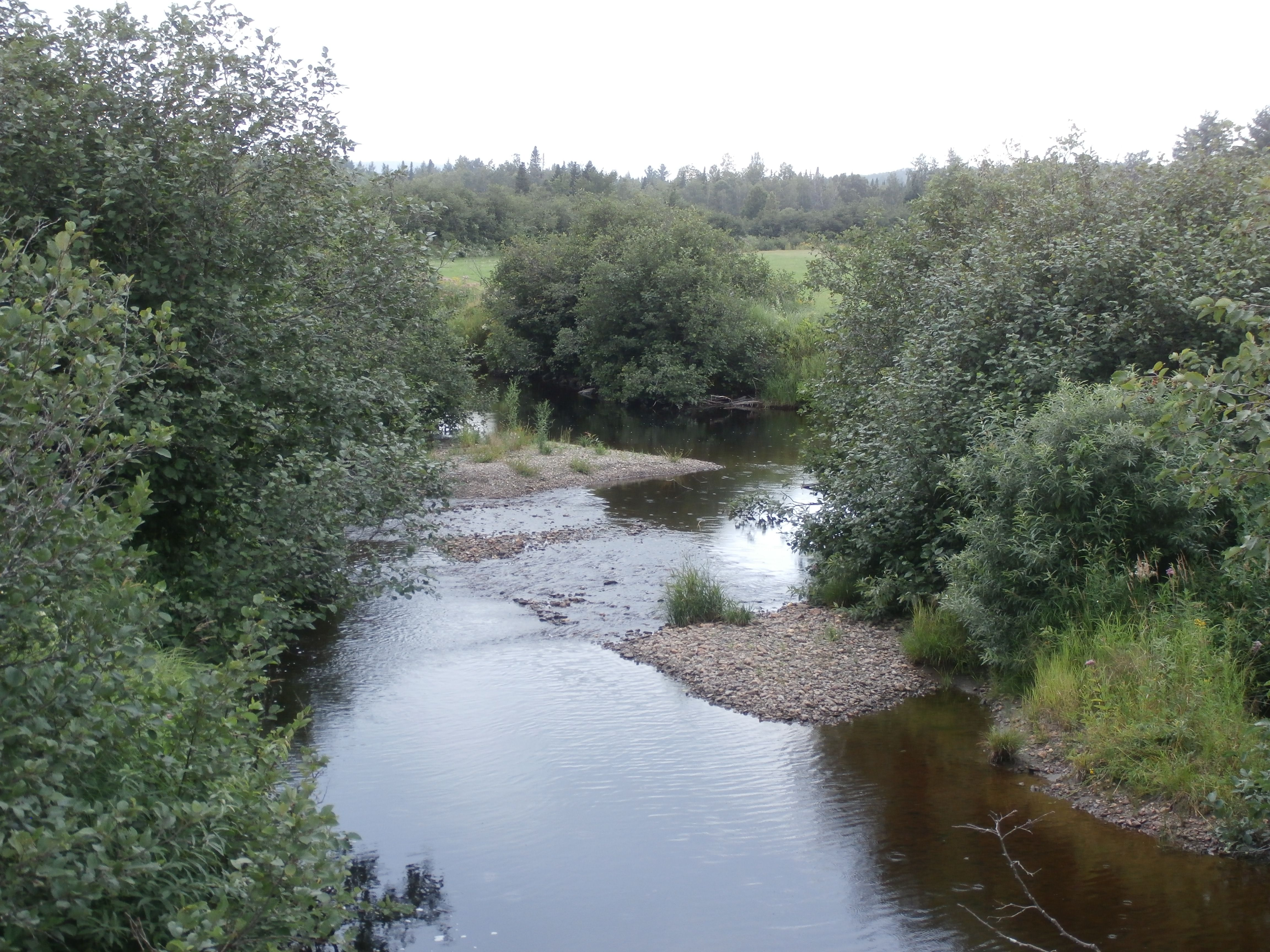
- Coulombe River upstream of Center Road in Beaulac-Garthby.

Location
- Country: Canada
- Province: Quebec
- Region: Estrie
- MRC: Le Haut-Saint-François Regional County Municipality
- Municipality: Saints-Martyrs-Canadiens and Weedon

Physical characteristics
- Source: Marsh area
  - location: Saints-Martyrs-Canadiens
  - coordinates: 45.86333°N 71.528536°W
  - elevation: 367 m (1,204 ft)
- Mouth: Lake Louise (Estrie), Saint-François River
  - location: Beaulac-Garthby
  - coordinates: 45.82555°N 71.39528°W
  - elevation: 248 m (814 ft)
- Length: 13.8 km (8.6 mi)

Basin features
- Progression: Saint-François River, St. Lawrence River
- Tributaries
  - right: (upward) Coulombe North River

The Coulombe River is a tributary of lake Aylmer which is crossed by the Saint-François River which constitutes a tributary of the south shore of St. Lawrence River.

The course of the Coulombe River flows on the South Shore of the St. Lawrence River, in Quebec, Canada. It crosses the territory of the municipalities of:

- Saints-Martyrs-Canadiens, located in the MRC Arthabaska Regional County Municipality, in the administrative region of Centre-du-Québec;
- Beaulac-Garthby, located in the Les Appalaches Regional County Municipality (MRC), in the administrative region of Estrie.

== Geography ==
The main neighboring watersheds of the Coulombe River are:

- north side: Lake Breeches, Sunday Lake;
- east side: Moose River, Longue Pointe watercourse, lake Aylmer, Saint-François River;
- south side: lake Aylmer, bay Ward;
- west side: Rivière au Canard (Haut Saint-François).

The Coulombe River has its source in a marsh area 2.0 kilometres (1.2 mi) west of Mont Louise, 1.6 kilometres (0.99 mi) south of the village center Saints-Martyrs-Canadiens, 1.2 kilometres (0.75 mi) east of an abandoned quarry and 1.6 kilometres (0.99 mi) south of Sunday Lake.

From this marsh area, the course of the Coulombe River flows over 13.8 kilometres (8.6 mi) divided into the following segments:

- 3.1 kilometres (1.9 mi) eastward, up to the confluence of the outlet of Lac Rond;
- 2.6 kilometres (1.6 mi) eastward, to the north shore of Lac Coulombe;
- 0.8 kilometres (0.50 mi) crossing to the south-east the Coulombe lake (length: 1.4 kilometres (0.87 mi); altitude: 301 metres (988 ft)), i.e. the main plane of water drained by the Coulombe River;
- 0.8 kilometres (0.50 mi) east, up to route 161 which the river crosses at 4.2 kilometres (2.6 mi) west of the intersection of route 112;
- 2.8 kilometres (1.7 mi) eastward, to the confluence of the Coulombe North River which is the main tributary;
- 2.2 kilometres (1.4 mi) south-east to a country road;
- 1.5 kilometres (0.93 mi) towards the south-east, to its mouth.

The Coulombe River empties on the west shore of Ward Bay of lake Aylmer. The mouth is located 1.3 kilometres (0.81 mi) (in a direct line) southwest of the intersection of route 161 and route 112 from the village of Beaulac-Garthby.

The resort is particularly developed around Ward Bay.

== Toponymy ==
The toponym Rivière Coulombe was officially registered on December 5, 1968, at the Commission de toponymie du Québec.

== See also ==
- Saint-François River, a stream
- Coulombe North River, a stream
- Lake Aylmer, a body of water
- Les Appalaches Regional County Municipality (MRC)
- Beaulac-Garthby, a municipality
- Saints-Martyrs-Canadiens, a municipality
- Disraeli, a municipality
- List of rivers of Quebec
