= Moose River (Québec) =

River in Chaudière-Appalaches, Quebec (Canada)

Location
- Country: Canada
- Province: Quebec
- Region: Chaudière-Appalaches
- MRC: Les Appalaches Regional County Municipality
- Municipality: Disraeli (parish), Beaulac-Garthby

Physical characteristics
- Source: Streams
  - location: Disraeli (parish)
  - coordinates: 45.920344°N 71.43606°W
  - elevation: 388 m (1,273 ft)
- Mouth: Saint-François River
  - location: Beaulac-Garthby
  - coordinates: 45.8575°N 71.3675°W
  - elevation: 249 m (817 ft)
- Length: 5.3 km (3.3 mi)

Basin features
- Progression: Saint-François River, St. Lawrence River

The rivière Moose is a tributary of lake Aylmer which is crossed by the Saint-François River which constitutes a tributary of the south shore of St. Lawrence River.

The course of the Moose River crosses the territory of the municipalities of Disraelil and Beaulac-Garthby, in the Les Appalaches Regional County Municipality (MRC), in the administrative region of Estrie, on the South Shore of the St. Lawrence River, in Quebec, Canada.

== Geography ==
The principal neighboring watersheds of the Moose River are:

- north side: lake Breeches;
- east side: lake Aylmer, Saint-François River, Moose bay;
- south side: Coulombe River, lake Aylmer;
- west side: Coulombe River.

The Mosse River originates between two mountains, 0.5 kilometres (0.31 mi) southeast of Lac Breeches and 1.3 kilometres (0.81 mi) southwest of route 263. Its source is located near the municipal boundary of Saint-Jacques-le-Majeur-de-Wolfestown.

From its head, the Moose River flows over:

- 1.1 kilometres (0.68 mi) south-east to Breeches Road;
- 2.0 kilometres (1.2 mi) southeasterly to the municipal boundary between Disraeli (parish) and Beaulac-Garthby;
- 2.2 kilometres (1.4 mi) south-east, then east, to its mouth.

The Moose River empties on a long strand on the west shore of Moose Bay which forms an appendage of lake Aylmer through which the St. Francis River crosses. Its confluence is located 0.7 kilometres (0.43 mi) north of the confluence of the Longue Pointe stream, at 1.6 kilometres (0.99 mi) south of the confluence of the Bourgeault stream and at 2.9 kilometres (1.8 mi) (direct line) from the intersection of route 161 and route 112 at village of Beaulac-Garthby.

The resort is particularly developed around Moose Bay.

== Toponymy ==
The toponym Rivière Moose was officially registered on December 5, 1968, at the Commission de toponymie du Québec.

== See also ==
- List of rivers of Quebec
