= Coulombe North River =

River in Estrie, Quebec (Canada)

Colombe North River
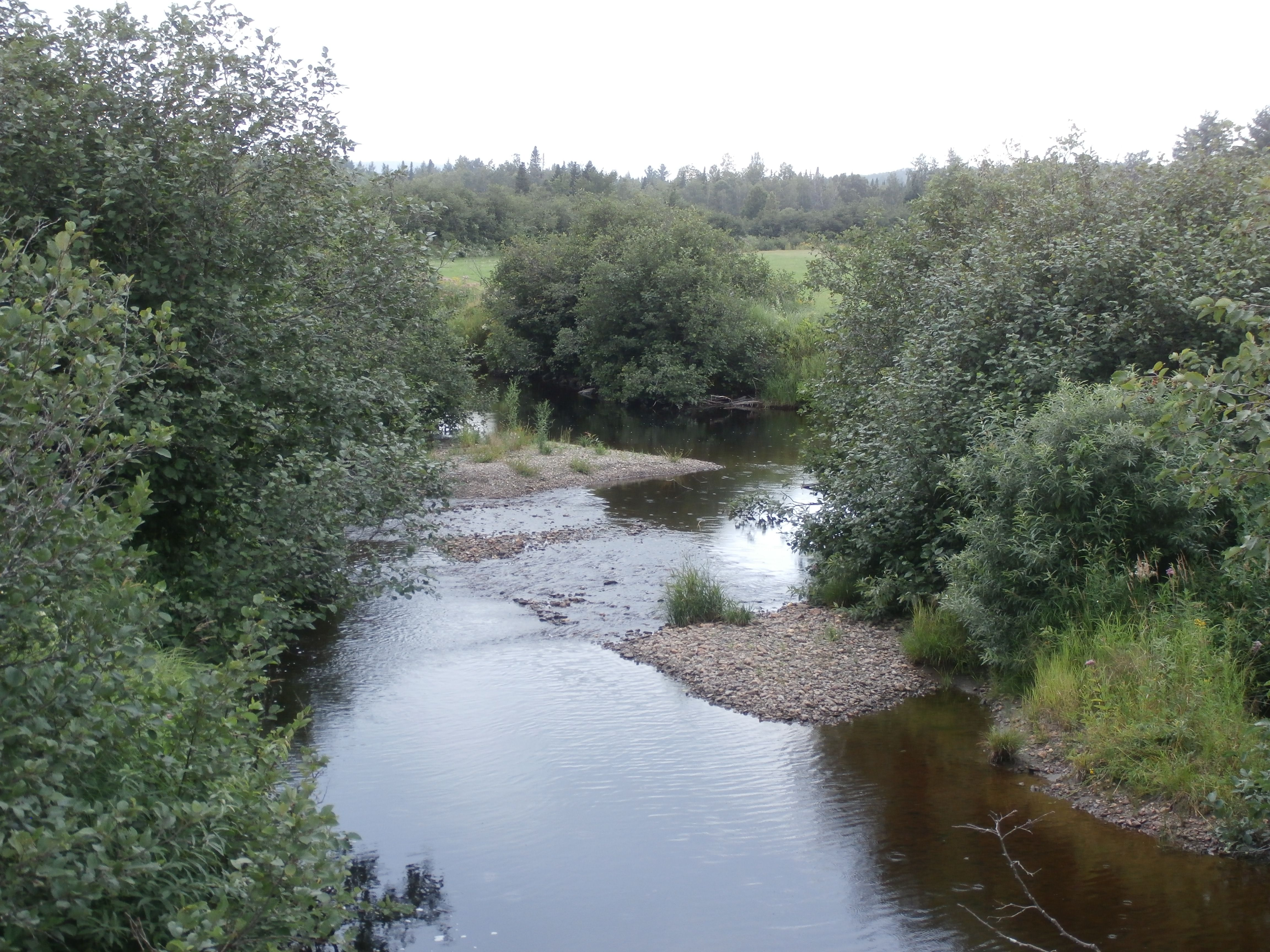
- Coulombe River upstream of Center Road in Beaulac-Garthby.

Location
- Country: Canada
- Province: Quebec
- Region: Estrie, Centre-du-Québec
- MRC: Arthabaska Regional County Municipality, Les Appalaches Regional County Municipality
- Municipality: Saints-Martyrs-Canadiens and Beaulac-Garthby

Physical characteristics
- Source: Little lake
  - location: Saints-Martyrs-Canadiens
  - coordinates: 45.856039°N 71.505099°W
  - elevation: 366 m (1,201 ft)
- Mouth: Coulombe River
  - location: Beaulac-Garthby
  - coordinates: 45.84278°N 71.42361°W
  - elevation: 259 m (850 ft)
- Length: 16.0 km (9.9 mi)

Basin features
- Progression: Coulombe River, Saint-François River, St. Lawrence River

The North Coulombe river (in French: rivière Coulombe Nord) is a tributary of the Coulombe River which flows into lake Aylmer crossed by the Saint-François River which constitutes a tributary of the south shore of the St. Lawrence River.

The course of the Coulombe North River flows on the South Shore of the St. Lawrence River, in Quebec, Canada. It crosses the territory of the municipalities of:

- Saints-Martyrs-Canadiens, located in the MRC Arthabaska Regional County Municipality, in the administrative region of Centre-du-Québec;
- Beaulac-Garthby, located in the regional county municipality (MRC) Les Appalaches Regional County Municipality, in the administrative region of Estrie.

== Geography ==
The main neighboring watersheds of the North Coulombe River are:

- north side: lake Breeches, Sunday lake;
- east side: Moose River, Longue Pointe watercourse, lake Aylmer, Saint-François River;
- south side: lake Aylmer, bay Ward, Saint-François River;
- west side: rivière au Canard.

The North Coulombe River takes its source at the mouth of a small marsh lake located on the north side of route 161, at 1.7 kilometres (1.1 mi) south of the Sunday Lake, 3.1 kilometres (1.9 mi) east of the village center of Saints-Martyrs-Canadiens and 2.6 kilometres (1.6 mi) south of Breeches Lake.

From the head lake, the Coulombe North river flows on 16.0 kilometres (9.9 mi) according to the following segments:

- 3.9 kilometres (2.4 mi) north-east, then east, to a stream (coming from the north-east);
- 3.4 kilometres (2.1 mi) towards the south-east, parallel (south side) to the limit of the municipality of Disraeli, to the municipal limit of Beaulac-Garthby;
- 8.7 kilometres (5.4 mi) towards the south-east, until its mouth.

The North Coulombe River flows into a forest area on the north shore of the Coulombe River, in the municipality of Beaulac-Garthby.

== Toponymy ==
The toponym "rivière Coulombe Nord" was officially registered on December 5, 1968, at the Commission de toponymie du Québec.

== See also ==
- List of rivers of Quebec
