= Coleraine River =

River in Chaudière-Appalaches, Quebec, Canada

- Native name: Rivière Coleraine (French)

Location
- Country: Canada
- Province: Quebec
- Region: Chaudière-Appalaches
- MRC: Les Appalaches Regional County Municipality
- Municipality: Saint-Joseph-de-Coleraine and Disraeli

Physical characteristics
- Source: Mountain streams
  - location: Saint-Joseph-de-Coleraine
  - coordinates: 45.985291°N 71.389887°W
  - elevation: 310 m (1,020 ft)
- Mouth: Saint-François River
  - location: Disraeli (parish)
  - coordinates: 45.92°N 71.37889°W
  - elevation: 248 m (814 ft)
- Length: 13.2 km (8.2 mi)

Basin features
- Progression: Saint-François River, St. Lawrence River
- Tributaries
  - left: (upstream) ruisseau de la Mine
  - right: (upstream) décharge du lac de l'Est, ruisseau du 1e rang

The Coleraine river (in French: rivière Coleraine) is a tributary of lake Noir whose waters flow into lake Aylmer; the latter constitutes an extension of the Saint-François River. The course of the Coleraine river crosses the territory of the municipalities of Saint-Joseph-de-Coleraine and Disraeli (parish), in the Les Appalaches Regional County Municipality of Les Appalaches Regional County Municipality, in the administrative region of Chaudière-Appalaches, on the South Shore of the St. Lawrence River, in Quebec, Canada.

== Geography ==
The main neighboring watersheds of the Coleraine river are:

- north side: Bécancour River, Noire River, Larochelle River, Sunday River;
- east side: Saint-François River;
- south side: lake Aylmer, Saint-François River;
- west side: Nicolet River, Osgood River, Blanche River.

The Coleraine River has its source at Saint-Joseph-de-Coleraine in the mountains, between Kerr Hill (west side; altitude: 470 metres (1,540 ft)) and Mont Oak (east side; altitude: 459 metres (1,506 ft)). Its source is located one kilometer north of an abandoned quarry.

From its starting point, the Coleraine river flows over 13.2 kilometres (8.2 mi) with a drop of 62 metres (203 ft), according to these segments:

- 5.4 kilometres (3.4 mi) southward to the confluence of the mine brook (coming from the north) which runs along route 112;
- 0.5 kilometres (0.31 mi) south, to the road bridge in the village of Saint-Joseph-de-Coleraine;
- 2.9 kilometres (1.8 mi) towards the south, up to the municipal limit between Saint-Joseph-de-Coleraine and Disraeli;
- 1.7 kilometres (1.1 mi) towards the south in the territory of Disraeli (parish), up to a body of water (altitude: 249 metres (817 ft)) formed by a widening of the river;
- 1.5 kilometres (0.93 mi) towards the south, crossing this body of water over its full length, to the road bridge;
- 1.2 kilometres (0.75 mi) towards the south, crossing a second body of water along its full length, up to its mouth; this lake is formed by the widening of the river.

The Coleraine River flows onto the north shore of Lac Noir (length: 2.3 kilometres (1.4 mi); altitude: 249 metres (817 ft)). The latter lake receives on its eastern shore the waters of the Bisby River. Black Lake connects from the south to Moose Bay, located northeast of lake Aylmer, the latter constituting a widening of the Saint-François River. The demarcation between Disraeli (parish) and Disraeli (city) is in the middle of the lake.

The resort is highly developed on the shores of Lake Aylmer, Lac Noir and the lower part of the Coleraine River. Recreational boating is very popular on these bodies of water.

In addition, Route 112 runs along the Coleraine River on the east bank for almost the entire length of the river and Lac Noir.

== Toponymy ==
The toponym "Rivière Coleraine" was officially registered on December 5, 1968, at the Commission de toponymie du Québec.

== See also ==
- List of rivers of Quebec
