= Blanche River (rivière au Pin tributary) =

River in Chaudière-Appalaches, Quebec (Canada)

- Native name: Rivière Blanche (French)

Location
- Country: Canada
- Province: Quebec
- Region: Chaudière-Appalaches
- MRC: Les Appalaches Regional County Municipality

Physical characteristics
- Source: Forest streams
  - location: Saint-Jacques-le-Majeur-de-Wolfestown
  - coordinates: 45.901509°N 71.507726°W
  - elevation: 386 m (1,266 ft)
- Mouth: Rivière au Pin
  - location: Saint-Julien
  - coordinates: 45.99639°N 71.46166°W
  - elevation: 219 m (719 ft)
- Length: 12.2 km (7.6 mi)

Basin features
- Progression: Rivière au Pin, Bécancour River, St. Lawrence River
- Tributaries
  - left: (upstream) ruisseau Lacroix, ruisseau Grimard.
  - right: (upstream) ruisseau Croteau.

The Blanche River (French: rivière Blanche, pronounced [ʁivjɛʁ blɑ̃ʃ], lit. 'White River') is a tributary of the rivière au Pin which is a tributary of the Bécancour River; the latter flows onto the south shore of the St. Lawrence River.

The Blanche River flows through the municipalities of Saint-Jacques-le-Majeur-de-Wolfestown and Saint-Julien, in the Les Appalaches Regional County Municipality (MRC), in the administrative region of Chaudière-Appalaches, in province of Quebec, in Canada.

== Geography ==
The main neighboring watersheds of the Blanche river are:

- north side: rivière au Pin, Bécancour River, Strater pond;
- east side: Bécancour River, Breeches Lake, Coleraine River;
- south side: Coulombe North River, Aunière stream, lake Nicolet;
- west side: Nicolet River, rivière des Vases, Grimard stream, Bulstrode River.

The Blanche River originates in the mountains on the north shore of Lake Breeches, in the municipality of Saint-Jacques-le-Majeur-de-Wolfestown. This head area is located 2.6 kilometres (1.6 mi) southeast of the “Chalet Hill” (altitude: 445 metres (1,460 ft)), at 3.4 kilometres (2.1 mi) southeast of the village of Saint-Jacques-le-Majeur-de-Wolfestown and 0.9 kilometres (0.56 mi) northeast of Breeches Lake.

From its head area, the Blanche river flows over 12.2 kilometres (7.6 mi) divided into the following segments:

- 3.0 kilometres (1.9 mi) north, to route 263;
- 2.7 kilometres (1.7 mi) north, up to the fourth rang road bridge;
- 1.5 kilometres (0.93 mi) north, to the municipal boundary between Saint-Jacques-le-Majeur-de-Wolfestown and Saint-Julien;
- 2.0 kilometres (1.2 mi) north, to a road bridge;
- 1.1 kilometres (0.68 mi) east, until you reach a road;
- 1.9 kilometres (1.2 mi) towards the northeast, up to its confluence.

The Blanche River empties on the west bank of the rivière au Pin. This confluence is located east of the village of Saint-Julien, west of Mont Caribou and 1.1 kilometres (0.68 mi) downstream of the boundary between Irlande) and Saint-Julien.

== Toponymy ==
The toponym “rivière Blanche” was made official on August 7, 1978, at the Commission de toponymie du Québec.

== See also ==
- List of rivers of Quebec
