= Bisby River =

River in Chaudière-Appalaches, Quebec (Canada)

Bixby River
- Native name: Rivière Bixby (French)

Location
- Country: Canada
- Province: Quebec
- Region: Chaudière-Appalaches
- MRC: Les Appalaches Regional County Municipality
- Municipality: Saint-Joseph-de-Coleraine and Disraeli

Physical characteristics
- Source: Mountain streams
  - location: Saint-Joseph-de-Coleraine
  - coordinates: 46.064937°N 71.313184°W
  - elevation: 408 m (1,339 ft)
- Mouth: Saint-François River
  - location: Disraeli
  - coordinates: 45.91472°N 71.3675°W
  - elevation: 288 m (945 ft)
- Length: 6.0 km (3.7 mi)

Basin features
- Progression: Saint-François River, St. Lawrence River
- Tributaries
  - left: (upstream) ruisseau Chrome, ruisseau Beebe
  - right: (upstream) ruisseau Dupuis

The Bisby River is a tributary of Lac Noir whose waters flow into lake Aylmer; the latter constitutes an extension of the Saint-François River. The course of the Bisby river crosses the territory of the municipalities of Saint-Joseph-de-Coleraine and Disraeli, in the Les Appalaches Regional County Municipality, in the administrative region of Chaudière-Appalaches, on the South Shore of the St. Lawrence River, in Quebec, Canada.

== Geography ==
The main neighboring watersheds of the Bisby River are:

- north side: Coleraine River;
- east side: Saint-François River;
- south side: Saint-François River;
- west side: lake Aylmer.

Bisby Lake

The Bisby River has its source at Bisby Lake (length: 0.8 kilometres (0.50 mi); altitude: 347 metres (1,138 ft)), located in the municipality of Saint-Joseph-de-Coleraine, at 2.0 kilometres (1.2 mi) north of the Saint-François River. This head lake is located 1.1 metres (3 ft 7 in) south of the summit of Mont Nadeau (altitude: 509 metres (1,670 ft)).

The route 112 and route 263 coming from the Allard dam road, give access to Bisby lake. Twenty-eight (28) homes have been built near the lake, fifteen of which are permanent residences

Bisby River

The Bisby River flows for six kilometers, parallel to the Saint-François River and passing as close as 0.6 kilometres (0.37 mi) southeast of Mont Bengel (elevation: 472 metres (1,549 ft)) and at 0.8 kilometres (0.50 mi) southeast of Colline Brousseau.

After a six-kilometer journey, the Bisby River empties onto the east shore of lake Aylmer, at 0.6 kilometres (0.37 mi) north of the city limit of Disraeli (city), 1.7 kilometres (1.1 mi) north of the Disraeli (city) bridge and 1.0 kilometre (0.62 mi) southeast of the mouth of the Coleraine River. Aylmer Lake receives the waters of the Coleraine River from the north, which connects to Moose Bay. The demarcation between Disraeli (parish) and Disraeli (city) is in the middle of the lake.

The resort is highly developed on the shores of lake Aylmer and the lower part of the Coleraine River. Recreational boating is very popular on these bodies of water.

== Toponymy ==
The term Bisby turns out to be a family name.

The toponym Rivière Bisby was officially registered on December 5, 1968, at the Commission de toponymie du Québec.

== See also ==
- List of rivers of Quebec
