= Bernier =

Bernier is a French surname. Notable people with the surname include:

- Chantal Bernier, Canadian lawyer
- Charles A. Bernier (1890–1963), American college sports coach
- David Bernier or Kike Bernier (born 1977), Puerto Rican fencer
- Étienne-Alexandre Bernier (1762–1806), French religious figure and politician
- François Bernier (1620–1688), Mughal physician and traveller
- Frédérique Bernier, French Canadian writer and academic
- Géo Bernier (1862–1918), Belgian painter
- Georges Bernier (1929–2005), French humorist
- Gilles Bernier (disambiguation), several people

- Gilles Bernier (Quebec politician) (born 1934), MP for Beauce, 1984–1997
- Gilles Bernier (New Brunswick politician) (born 1955) MP for Tobique—Mactaquac, 1997–2000

- Guylaine Bernier (born 1948), Canadian rower and sports leader
- Joachim Bernier de La Brousse (1580–1623), French poet
- Jonathan Bernier (born 1988), Canadian ice hockey player
- Joseph Bernier (1874–1951), Canadian politician
- Joseph-Elzéar Bernier (1852–1934), Canadian mariner
- Leo Bernier (1928–2010), Canadian politician
- Maxime Bernier (born 1963), Canadian politician and cabinet minister
- Mélanie Bernier (born 1985), French actress
- Melanie Bernier (ski mountaineer) (born 1981), Canadian ski mountaineer
- Nicolas Bernier (1664–1734), French composer
- Patrice Bernier (born 1979), Canadian soccer player
- Paul Bernier (1906–1964), Canadian archbishop, Vatican diplomat
- René Bernier (1901–1984), Belgian composer
- Steve Bernier (born 1985), Canadian ice hockey player
- Sylvie Bernier (born 1964), Canadian Olympic athlete
- Yahn Bernier (born 1968), American software developer at Valve Software

== See also ==
- Bernier's teal (Anas bernieri), a bird
- Bernier River
- Bernier Island in Western Australia
