= Bernier River (Saint-François River tributary) =

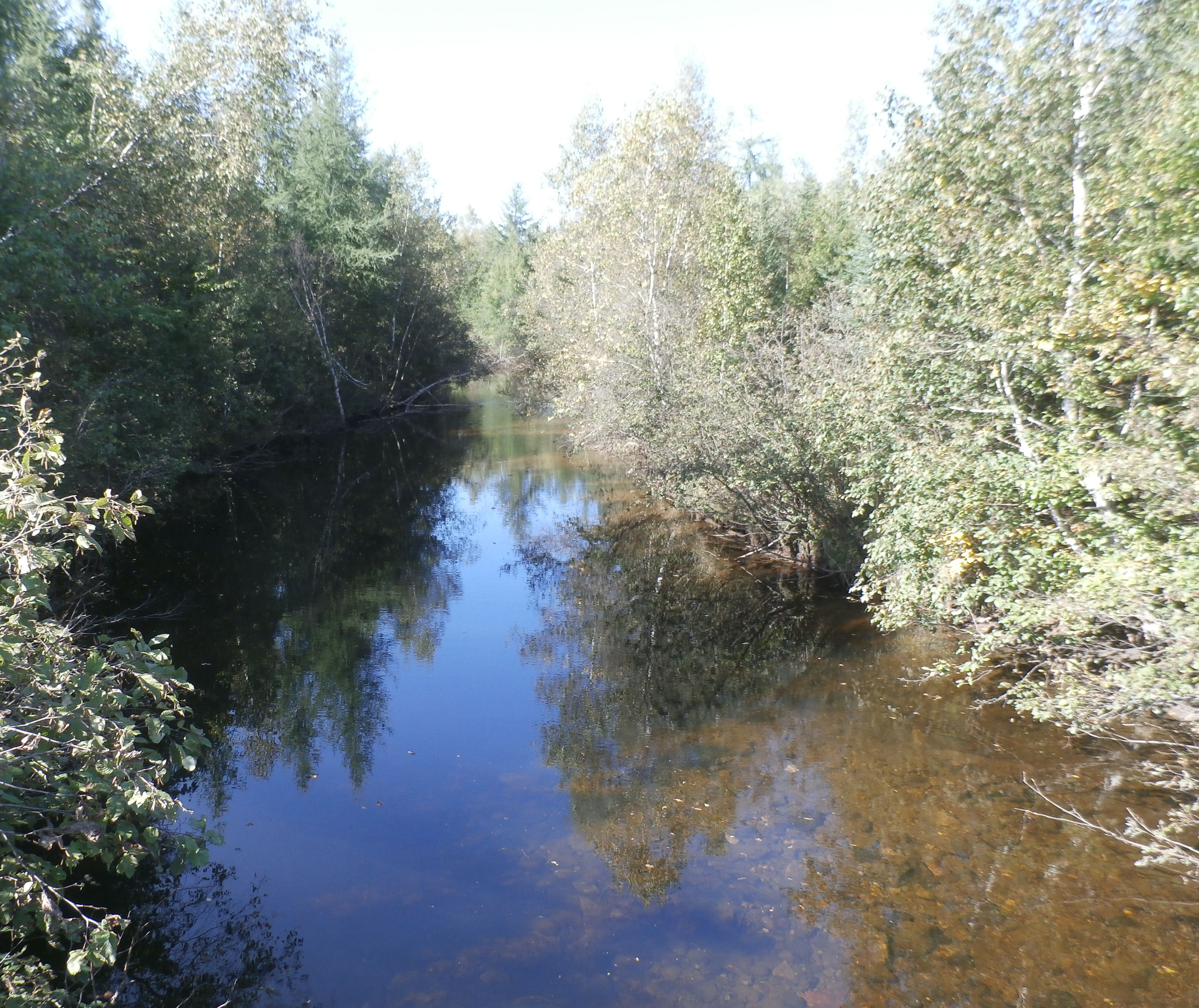
- Bernier River (Maskinongé) downstream from the Highway 161 bridge near Stratford, and very close to the Maskinongé Marsh.

Location
- Country: Canada
- Province: Quebec
- Region: Estrie
- Regional County Municipality: Le Granit Regional County Municipality

Physical characteristics
- Source: Maskinongé Lake (Frontenac National Park)
  - location: Stratford
  - coordinates: 45.778141°N 71.245354°E
  - elevation: 293 m (961 ft)
- Mouth: Saint-François River
  - location: Stratford
  - coordinates: 45.78111°N 71.34306°W
  - elevation: 248 m (814 ft)
- Length: 10.5 km (6.5 mi)

Basin features
- Progression: Saint-François River, St. Lawrence River
- Tributaries
  - left: (Upstream) Lake Elgin outlet, Rivard Creek.
  - right: (Upstream) Stream crossing the village

The Bernier River is a tributary of the Saint-François River. The "Bernier River" flows in the municipality of Stratford, in the Le Granit Regional County Municipality, in the administrative region of Estrie, in Quebec, in Canada.

The river surface is generally frozen from mid-December to the end of March. Safe traffic on the ice is generally from late December to early March. The water level of the river varies with the seasons and the precipitation.

== Geography ==
The hydrographic slopes neighboring the "Bernier river" are:

- north side: Saint-François River;
- east side: Maskinongé lake, Troisième stream, Jackman stream;
- south side: rivière au Rat;
- west side: Elgin Lake, Saint-François River.

The "Bernier River" has its source in a forest environment at Maskinongé Lake (Stratford). This lake is located west of "lac des îles" in Frontenac National Park (at the western limit). Triangular in shape and 2.4 kilometres (1.5 mi) in length, this lake is surrounded by mountains.

From Maskinongé Lake, the course of the river flows on the south shore of the Saint-François River on 10.5 kilometres (6.5 mi) according to the following segments:

- 2.6 kilometres (1.6 mi) westward to route 261 which it crosses at 0.7 kilometres (0.43 mi) east of village of Stratford;
- 1.2 kilometres (0.75 mi) to the west, collecting the water from the stream (coming from the north) which crosses the village, up to the confluence of the Rivard stream (coming from the south);
- 0.5 kilometres (0.31 mi) west, passing south of the village and north of Mont Aylmer, to Elgin road;
- 2.4 kilometres (1.5 mi) westwards, up to the Cupra road;
- 2.1 kilometres (1.3 mi) to the west, collecting a stream (coming from the north), up to the Cupra road;
- 0.5 kilometres (0.31 mi) westwards, to the outlet of Elgin Lake (altitude: 256 metres (840 ft)). Note: This triangular lake surrounded by resorts is located west of Mont Aylmer;
- 0.4 kilometres (0.25 mi) westward to route 261;
- 0.8 kilometres (0.50 mi) westward to its mouth.

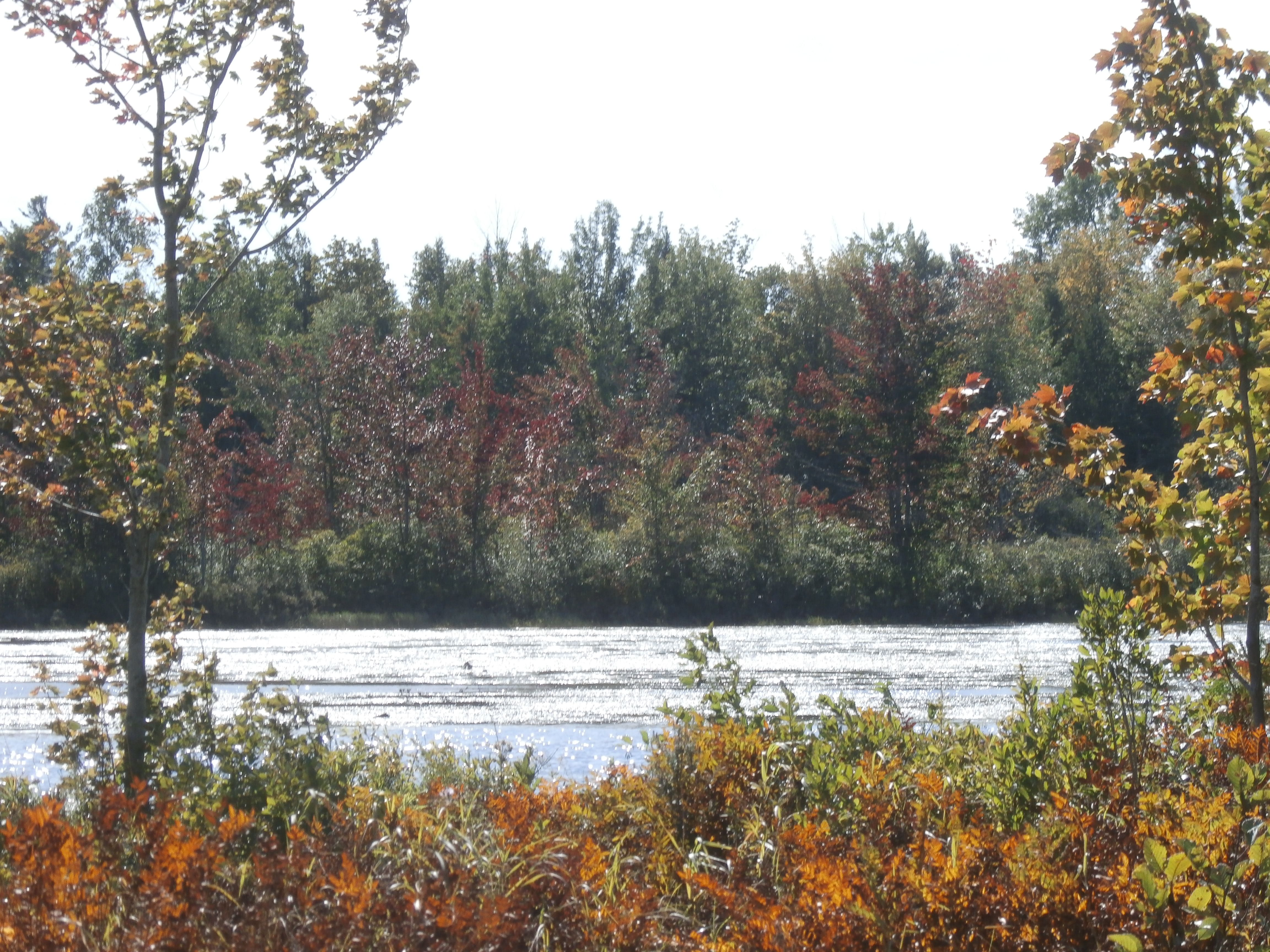
Marais Maskinongé

The Bernier river crosses a marsh with an area of 25 hectares defined as "swamp and swampy stream" which flows to the bottom of a bay on the south shore of Lake Aylmer which is crossed to the southwest by the Saint-François River. A path leads to an interpretation center and to the Maskinongé Marsh Trail.

== Toponymy ==
The term "Bernier" constitutes a family name of French origin.

The toponym "Bernier river" was formalized on December 5, 1968 at the Commission de toponymie du Québec.

== See also ==
- Lake Aylmer, a body of water
- Saint-François River, a stream
- Stratford, a municipality
- Le Granit Regional County Municipality
- Frontenac National Park
- List of rivers of Quebec
