= Larochelle River =

River in Chaudière-Appalaches, Quebec (Canada)

- Native name: Rivière Larochelle (French)

Location
- Country: Canada
- Province: Quebec
- Region: Chaudière-Appalaches
- MRC: Les Appalaches Regional County Municipality

Physical characteristics
- Source: Forest streams
  - location: Saint-Julien
  - coordinates: 46.00247°N 71.53809°W
  - elevation: 370 m (1,210 ft)
- Mouth: Bécancour River
  - location: Irlande
  - coordinates: 46.06088°N 71.544921°W
  - elevation: 200 m (660 ft)
- Length: 15.7 km (9.8 mi)

Basin features
- Progression: Bécancour River, St. Lawrence River
- Tributaries
  - left: (upstream) ruisseau Gardner, ruisseau Provencher, ruisseau Sasseville
  - right: (upstream)

The Larochelle River (in French: rivière Larochelle) is a tributary of the Bécancour River. It flows in the municipalities of Saint-Julien and Irlande, in the Les Appalaches Regional County Municipality (MRC), in the administrative region of Chaudière-Appalaches, in Quebec, in Canada.

== Geography ==
The main neighboring watersheds of the Larochelle river are:

- north side: Bécancour River, William Lake;
- east side: Bécancour River, Lac à la Truite;
- south side: Blanche River;
- west side: Côté brook, Bulstrode River.

The Larochelle River has its source in the mountains, 1.7 kilometres (1.1 mi) west at the village of Saint-Julien, 4.1 kilometres (2.5 mi) northeast of the village of Saint-Fortunat and 7.9 kilometres (4.9 mi) northwest of the village of Saint-Jacques-le-Majeur-de-Wolfestown.

From its head, the Larochelle river flows over 15.7 kilometres (9.8 mi) divided into the following segments:

- 0.9 kilometres (0.56 mi) towards the south-east, in the municipality of Saint-Julien, to a forest road;
- 4.3 kilometres (2.7 mi) north-east, up to the road;
- 2.6 kilometres (1.6 mi) north, to the west 2e rang road;
- 3.6 kilometres (2.2 mi) north, up to the hamlet "Le Cent-Ans" bridge;
- 2.5 kilometres (1.6 mi) north, to the hamlet bridge "Maple Grove";
- 1.8 kilometres (1.1 mi) eastward, up to its confluence.

The Larochelle river empties on the west bank of the Bécancour River. This confluence is located 1.1 east of the hamlet "Maple Grove", 0.6 kilometres (0.37 mi) upstream from "Lac à la Truite" and 3.6 kilometres (2.2 mi) in upstream of William Lake.

== Toponymy ==
The toponym "rivière Larochelle" was made official on August 17, 1978, at the Commission de toponymie du Québec.

== See also ==
- List of rivers of Quebec
