= Rivière au Canard (Haut Saint-François) =

River in Estrie, Quebec (Canada)

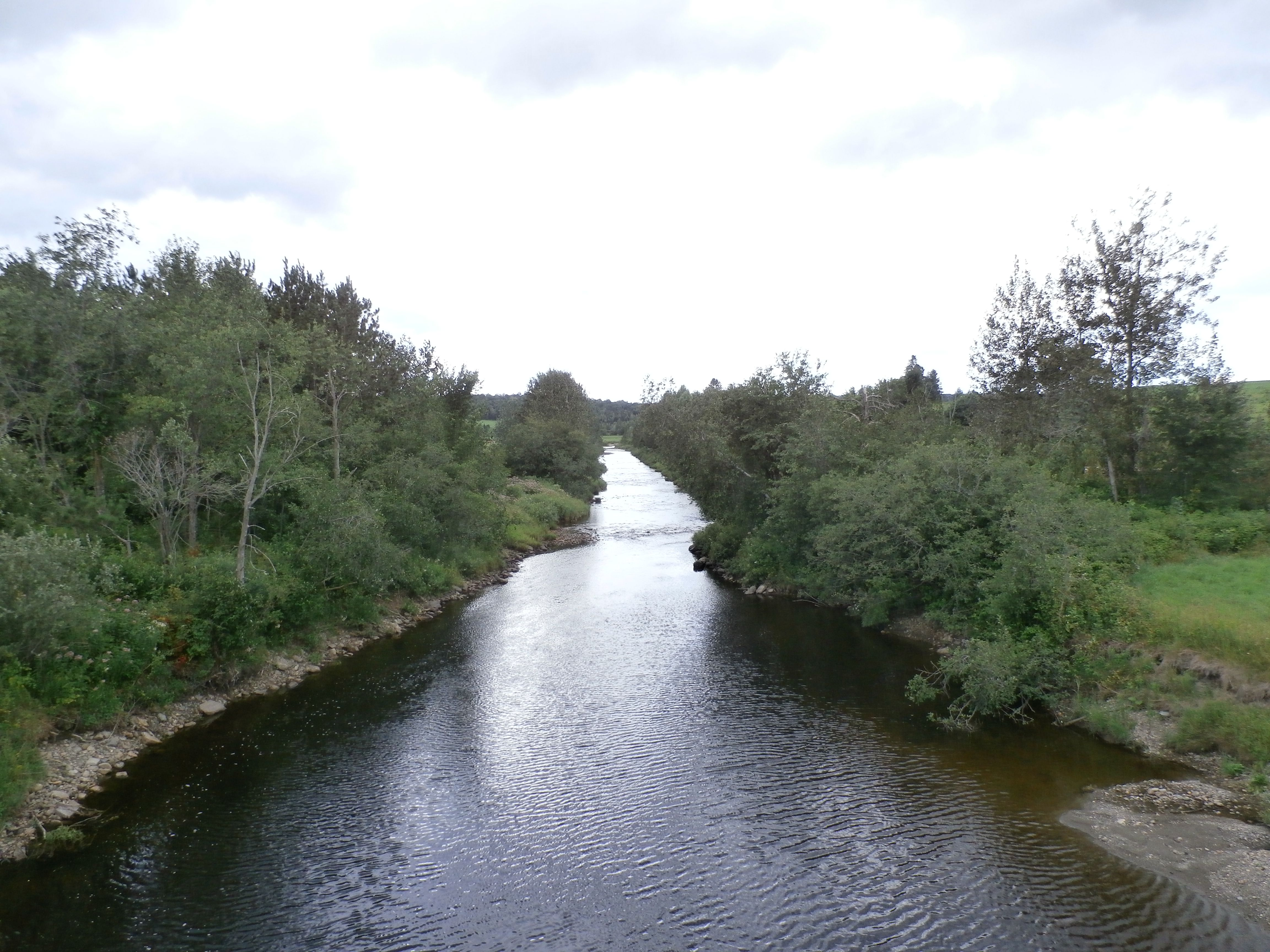

Location
- Country: Canada
- Province: Quebec
- Region: Estrie
- MRC: Le Haut-Saint-François Regional County Municipality
- Municipality: Saints-Martyrs-Canadiens and Weedon

Physical characteristics
- Source: Streams
  - location: Saints-Martyrs-Canadiens
  - coordinates: 45.787932°N 71.528536°W
  - elevation: 343 m (1,125 ft)
- Mouth: Lake Louise (Estrie), Saint-François River
  - location: Weedon
  - coordinates: 45.71778°N 71.4225°W
  - elevation: 242 m (794 ft)
- Length: 13.9 km (8.6 mi)

Basin features
- Progression: Saint-François River, St. Lawrence River
- Tributaries
  - right: (upward) Ruisseau Mud, ruisseau Dufresne.

The rivière au Canard (in English: Duck River) is a watercourse crossing the municipality of Weedon, in the Le Haut-Saint-François Regional County Municipality (MRC), in the administrative region of Estrie, in Quebec, in Canada.

== Geography ==
The neighboring hydrographic slopes of Lac au Canard are:

- north side: Canard Lake;
- east side: Coulombe River;
- south side: lake Louise, Saint-François River;
- west side: Dufresne stream, Mud stream, Pinard stream, Nicolet River.

The river has its source in Lac au Canard (length: 3.6 kilometres (2.2 mi); altitude: 340 metres (1,120 ft)) whose mouth is located on the south side. This lake is located 1.1 kilometres (0.68 mi) southeast of Lake Nicolet, 3.3 kilometres (2.1 mi) south of the center of the village of Saints-Martyrs-Canadiens and 8.3 kilometres (5.2 mi) northwest of the center of the village of Saint-Gérard which is amalgamated into the municipality of Weedon.

From Lac au Canard, the Rivière au Canard flows for a distance of 13.9 kilometres (8.6 mi) in the following segments:

- 6.5 kilometres (4.0 mi) towards the south-east, the south-west and the south, collecting the waters of the Dufresne stream (coming from the west), up to the municipal limit between Saint-Joseph-de-Ham-Sud and Weedon;
- 4.7 kilometres (2.9 mi) southeasterly, along (on the west side) the limit of the Saint-Gérard sector, up to the confluence of the stream Mud (coming from the west);
- 0.7 kilometres (0.43 mi) southeasterly, to route 112, which it crosses at 3.0 kilometres (1.9 mi) north- east of the village center of Weedon;
- 2.9 kilometres (1.8 mi) towards the south-east, to its mouth.

The Canard River flows into Lake Louise, a lake crossed by the Saint-François River, near Weedon.

== Toponymy ==
The toponym "Rivière au Canard" was made official on December 5, 1968, at the Commission de toponymie du Québec.

== See also ==
- Les Appalaches Regional County Municipality
- List of rivers of Quebec
