= Sunday Lake =

Sunday Lake may refer to:

- Sunday Lake, Quebec, a lake Saints-Martyrs-Canadiens, Saints-Martyrs-Canadiens, Arthabaska Regional County Municipality, Centre-du-Québec, Quebec, Canada
- Sunday Lake, Minnesota, an unorganized territory in St. Louis County, Minnesota, United States
- Sunday Lake, Washington, a census-designated place in Snohomish County, Washington, United States
- Sunday Lake, a lake in Wakefield, Michigan, United States
