= Beaulac, Quebec =

Coordinates: 45.834076°N 71.382878°W

Beaulac is a former municipality and an unincorporated community in Beaulac-Garthby, Quebec, Canada. It is recognized as a designated place by Statistics Canada.

== History ==
The municipality of Beaulac was officially created on December 17, 1896 by separating from Garthby. On March 15, 2000, Beaulac and Garthby merged to create the new municipality of Beaulac-Garthby.

== Demographics ==
In the 2021 Census of Population conducted by Statistics Canada, Beaulac had a population of 451 living in 240 of its 371 total private dwellings, a change of 3.9% from its 2016 population of 434. With a land area of 8.35 km^{2} (3.22 sq mi), it had a population density of 54.0/km^{2} (139.9/sq mi) in 2021.

== See also ==
- List of communities in Quebec
- List of designated places in Quebec
- List of former municipalities in Quebec
