= Breeches Lake =

Lake in Centre-du-Québec, Quebec (Canada)

Sunday Lake
- Lac Sunday (French)
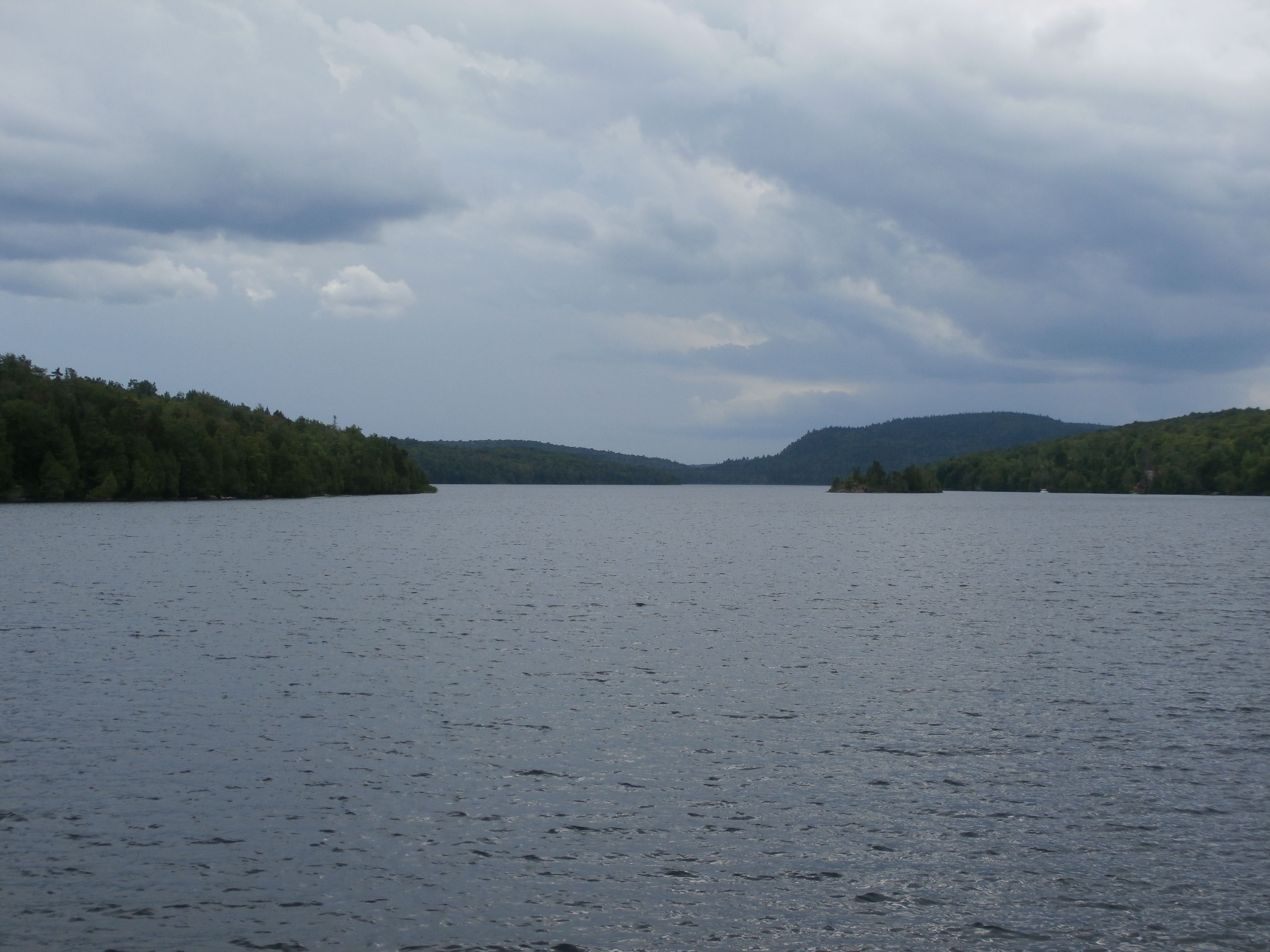
- Lac Breeches seen from route 263.

- Location within Quebec
- Location: Arthabaska Regional County Municipality, Centre-du-Québec, Quebec, Canada
- Coordinates: 45.91°N 71.47028°W
- Primary inflows: Discharge of Sunday Lake
- Primary outflows: Rivière au Pin
- Max. length: 3.2 kilometres (2.0 mi)
- Max. width: 1.3 kilometres (0.81 mi)
- Surface area: 2.47 kilometres (1.53 mi)
- Average depth: 13 metres (43 ft)
- Max. depth: 31 metres (102 ft)
- Surface elevation: 354 metres (1,161 ft)
- Frozen: End of December to beginning of March

The Breeches Lake (in French: Lac Breeches) is located 24 km south of Thetford Mines, in the municipality of Saint-Jacques-le-Majeur-de-Wolfestown. It is located near the head of the rivière au Pin, in the southern watershed of the Bécancour River.

== Geography ==
The lake is surrounded by 450 hectares of protected land of which "The Wolfe County Hunting and Fishing Club", founded in 1898, largely owns. The shores around the lake are almost entirely natural; only 40 chalets were built there. The lake receives the discharge from Sunday Lake to the south and is bordered to the north by route 263.
