= Rivière au Rat (Weedon) =

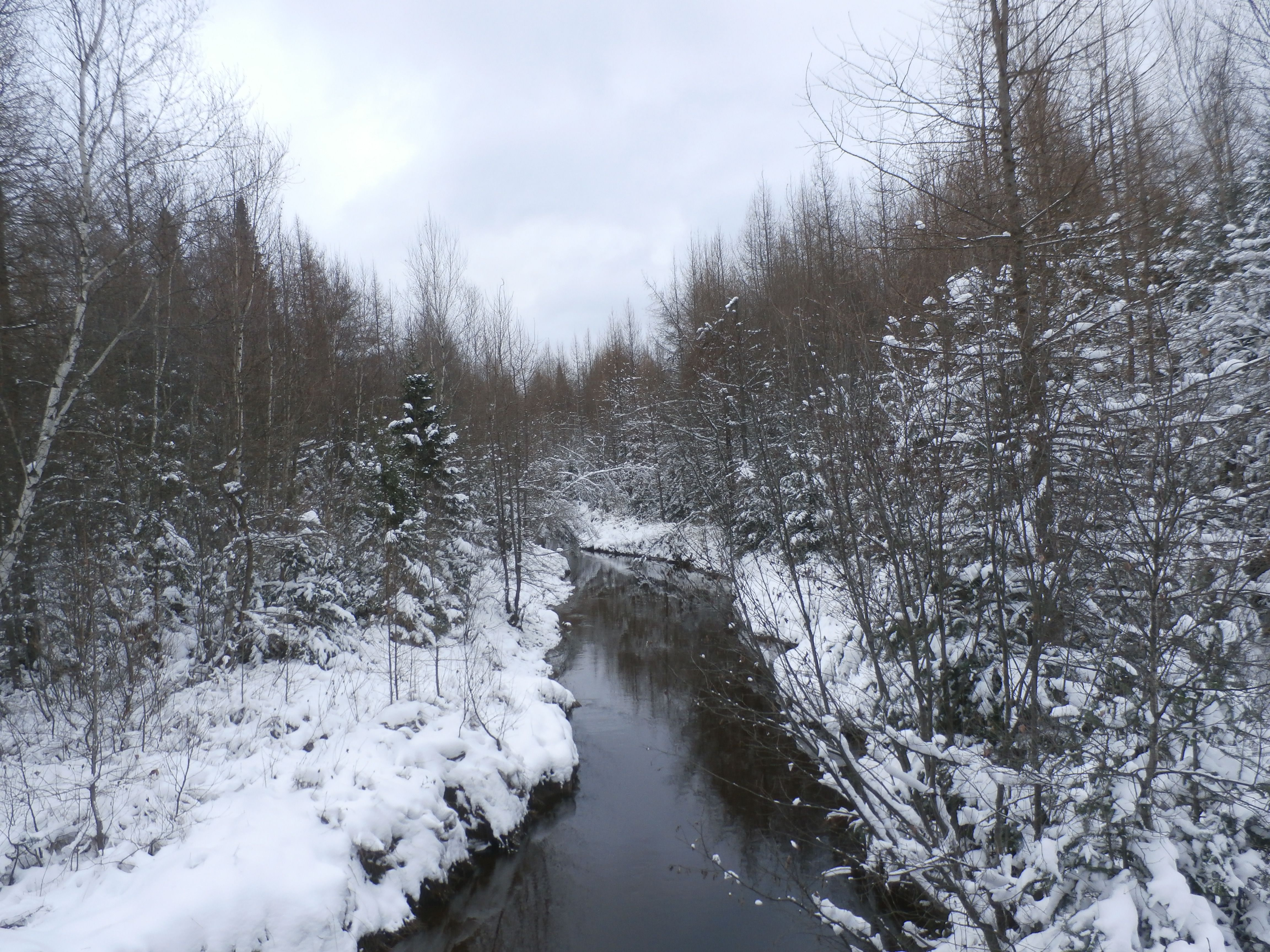

Location
- Country: Canada
- Province: Quebec
- Region: Estrie
- Municipality: Weedon

Physical characteristics
- Source: Mountain streams
  - location: Weedon
  - coordinates: 45°43′16″N 71°23′01″W
  - elevation: 268 m (879 ft)
- Mouth: Saint-François River
  - location: Weedon
  - coordinates: 45°42′18″N 71°26′06″W
  - elevation: 232 m (761 ft)
- Length: 8.5 km (5.3 mi)

Basin features
- Progression: Saint-François River, Saint Lawrence River
- Tributaries
  - left: (upstream) 5 streams
  - right: (upstream) 1 stream

The Rat River is a tributary of the Saint-François River. The "Rat River" flows in the municipality of Weedon, in the Le Haut-Saint-François Regional County Municipality, in the region administrative Estrie, Quebec, Canada.

== Geography ==
The hydrographic slopes adjacent to the "Rat River" are:

- north side: Saint-François River, Lake Louise;
- east side: Elgin Lake;
- south side: rivière au Saumon (Le Haut-Saint-François);
- west side: Saint-François River, rivière au Saumon (Le Haut-Saint-François).

The "Rat River" has its source in a forest environment on the boundary of the former municipalities of Weedon and Fontainebleau, on the west side of the mine road, west of Lake Elgin and east of Lake Louise.

Its course of 8.5 km (5.3 mi) first heads south-west in parallel (south-east side) to Saint-François River, then turns north-west along the path of Fontainebleau, to its mouth. Its course passes at 1.2 km (0.75 mi) north of the village center of Fontainebleau.

The "Rat River" flows onto the south bank of the Saint-François River, 240 m (790 ft) upstream from the Fontainebleau road bridge and 1.0 km (0.62 mi) downstream of the mouth of Lake Louise.

== Toponymy ==
The toponym "Rivière au Rat" was formalized on December 5, 1968, at the Commission de toponymie du Québec.

== See also ==
- List of rivers of Quebec
