= Bernier River =

Bernier River may refer to:

- Bernier River (Saint-Maurice River tributary), in Saint-Boniface, Maskinongé Regional County Municipality, Mauricie, Quebec, Canada
- Bernier River (Saint-François River tributary), in Stratford, Le Granit Regional County Municipality, Estrie, Quebec, Canada
- Bernier River (Richelieu River tributary), in Saint-Jean-sur-Richelieu, Le Haut-Richelieu Regional County Municipality, Montérégie, Quebec, Canada
