= Stratford, Quebec =

Stratford
- Township municipality
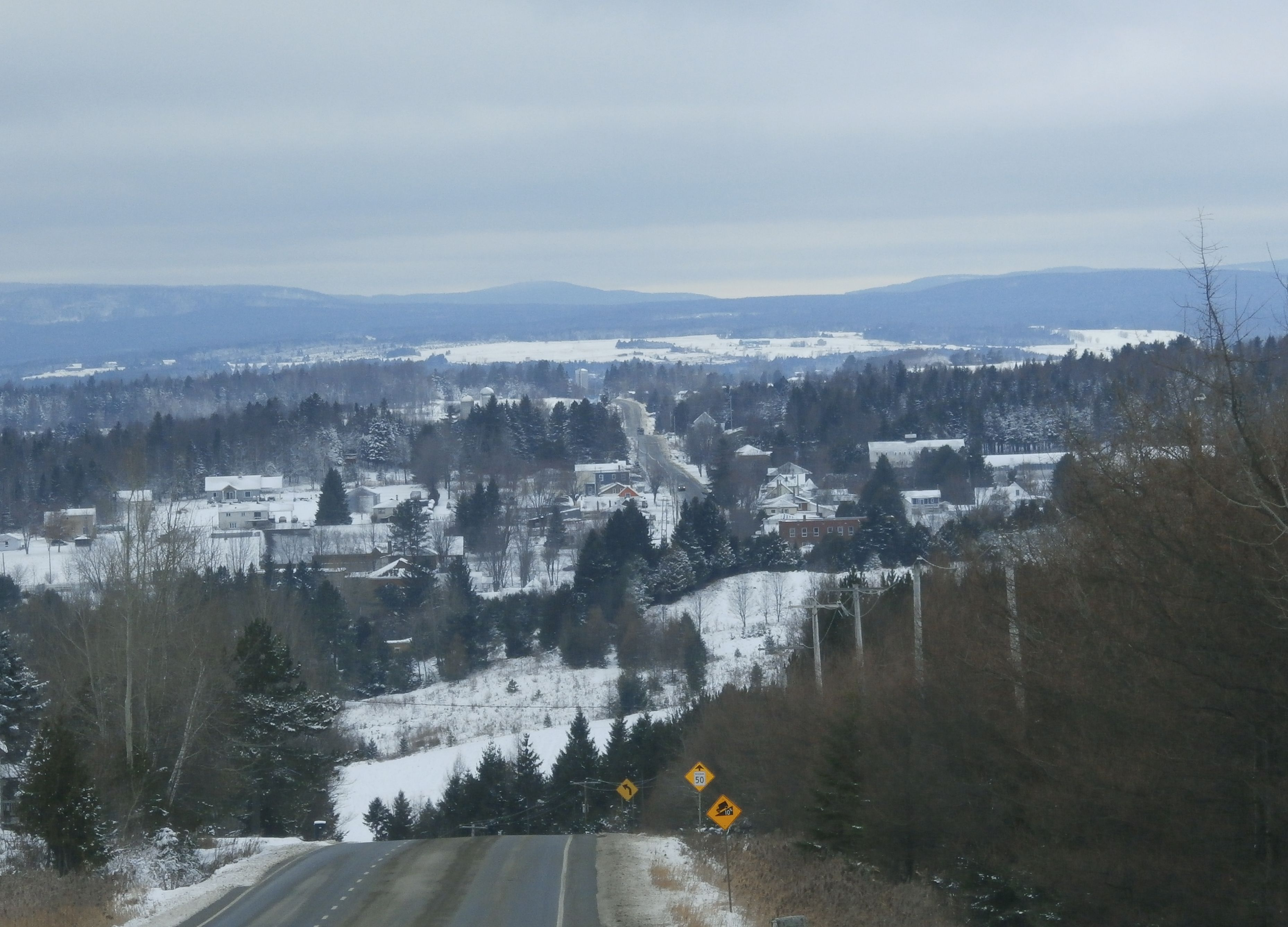
- Village of Stratford

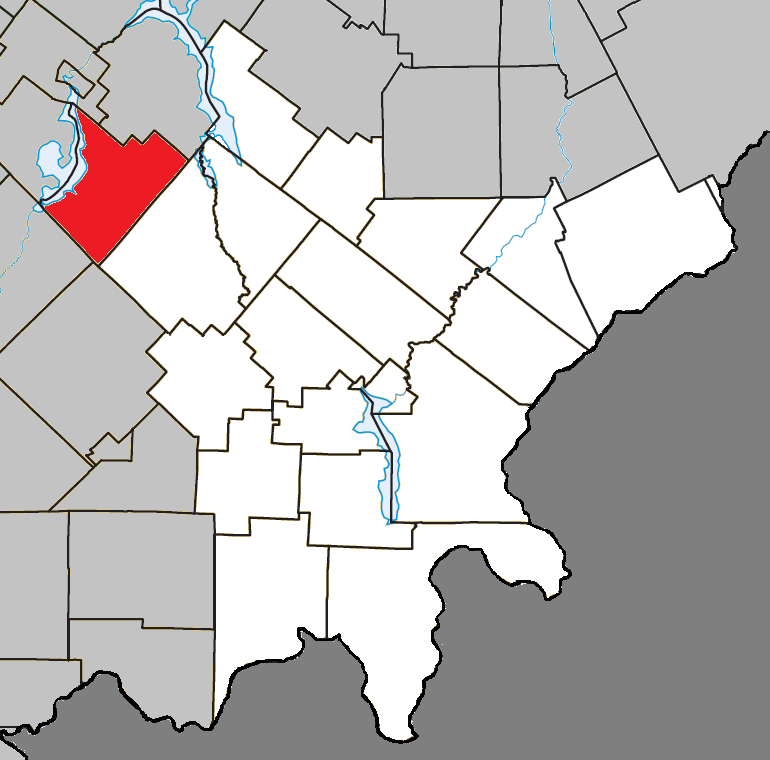
- Location within Le Granit RCM

- Location in southern Quebec
- Coordinates: 45°47′N 71°17′W
- Country: Canada
- Province: Quebec
- Region: Estrie
- RCM: Le Granit
- Constituted: 15 March 1969
- Named for: Stratford-upon-Avon

Government
  - Mayor: Daniel Morin
  - Federal riding: Mégantic—L'Érable—Lotbinière
  - Prov. riding: Mégantic

Area
  - Total: 139.50 km^{2} (53.86 sq mi)
  - Land: 119.86 km^{2} (46.28 sq mi)

Population (2021)
  - Total: 1,036
  - Density: 8.6/km^{2} (22/sq mi)
  - Pop 2016-2021: ▲9.6%
  - Dwellings: 946
- Time zone: UTC−5 (EST)
  - Summer (DST): UTC−4 (EDT)
- Postal code(s): G0Y 1P0
- Area codes: 418 and 581
- Highways: R-161
- Website: www.stratford.quebec

Stratford is a township municipality in Le Granit Regional County Municipality in the Estrie region in Quebec, Canada. A township municipality is all or part of the territory of a township (townships were originally only a land surveying feature) set up as a municipality.

The first European settlers arrived in 1848. The town is named after Stratford-upon-Avon in England.

The town contains Lake Elgin and part of Lake Aylmer.

The population, almost entirely francophone, was 1,036 in the Canada 2021 Census.

== History ==
Stratford was created in 1874 when Garthby-et-Stratford was split in two distinct municipalities, respectively Garthby and Stratford. In 1883, a sections from both municipalities was taken from the creation of the municipality of D'Israëli.

== Demographics ==
In the 2021 Census of Population conducted by Statistics Canada, Stratford had a population of 1,036 living in 533 of its 946 total private dwellings, a change of 9.6% from its 2016 population of 945. With a land area of 119.86 km^{2} (46.28 sq mi), it had a population density of 8.6/km^{2} (22.4/sq mi) in 2021.

Canada census – Stratford, Quebec community profile

	2021	2016	2011
Population	1,036 (-9.6% from 2016)	945 (-11.0% from 2011)	1,062 (-2.2% from 2006)
Land area	119.86 km^{2} (46.28 sq mi)	120.89 km^{2} (46.68 sq mi)	120.45 km^{2} (46.51 sq mi)
Population density	8.6/km^{2} (22/sq mi)	7.8/km^{2} (20/sq mi)	8.8/km^{2} (23/sq mi)
Median age	61.2 (M: 61.2, F: 61.2)	58.3 (M: 59.0, F: 57.9)	55.3 (M: 55.5, F: 55.1)
Private dwellings	946 (total)	895 (total)	913 (total)
Median household income	$62,000	$53,312	$51,204

References: 2021 2016 2011

Historical census populations – Stratford, Quebec

Year	Pop.	±%
1881	720	—
1891	723	+0.4%
1901	769	+6.4%
1911	1,009	+31.2%
1921	1,111	+10.1%
1931	1,109	−0.2%
1941	1,202	+8.4%
1951	1,031	−14.2%
1956	1,138	+10.4%
1961	1,074	−5.6%
1966	1,033	−3.8%

Year	Pop.	±%
1971	928	−10.2%
1976	855	−7.9%
1981	820	−4.1%
1986	751	−8.4%
1991	785	+4.5%
1996	786	+0.1%
2001	873	+11.1%
2006	1,086	+24.4%
2011	1,062	−2.2%
2016	945	−11.0%
2021	1,036	+9.6%

Source: Statistics Canada

== See also ==
Types of municipalities in Quebec
