= Gilles Bernier =

Gilles Bernier may refer to:

- Gilles Bernier (Quebec politician) (born 1934), Canadian politician and diplomat, MP for Beauce, 1984–1997
- Gilles Bernier (New Brunswick politician) (born 1955), Canadian politician, MP for Tobique—Mactaquac, 1997–2000
