= Sunday Lake (Quebec) =

Lake in Centre-du-Québec, Quebec (Canada)

- Lac Sunday (French)
- Location within Quebec
- Location: Arthabaska Regional County Municipality, Centre-du-Québec, Quebec, Canada,
- Coordinates: 45.88°N 71.51028°W
- Primary outflows: Rivière au Pin
- Max. length: 2.5 kilometres (1.6 mi)
- Max. width: 0.6 kilometres (0.37 mi)
- Surface area: 0.85 kilometres (0.53 mi)
- Max. depth: 46 metres (151 ft)
- Surface elevation: 370 metres (1,210 ft)
- Frozen: End of December to beginning of March

Sunday Lake (in French: lac Sunday) is a lake located in the municipality of Saints-Martyrs-Canadiens, in the Arthabaska Regional County Municipality, in the administrative region du Centre-du-Québec, in Québec, in Canada. It is headlake of the rivière au Pin, about 1.5 km (0.93 mi) upstream from Breeches Lake.

== Geography ==
The lake, 2.5 km (1.6 mi) long and 600 metres (2,000 ft) wide, is private and the Brothers of the Sacred Heart own it; the banks are almost entirely wooded. Camp Beauséjour is a welcoming place for groups and families. Recreational trips, a family camp, and fishing are available.
