= Lac Louise (Estrie) =

Lake in Weedon, Quebec, Canada

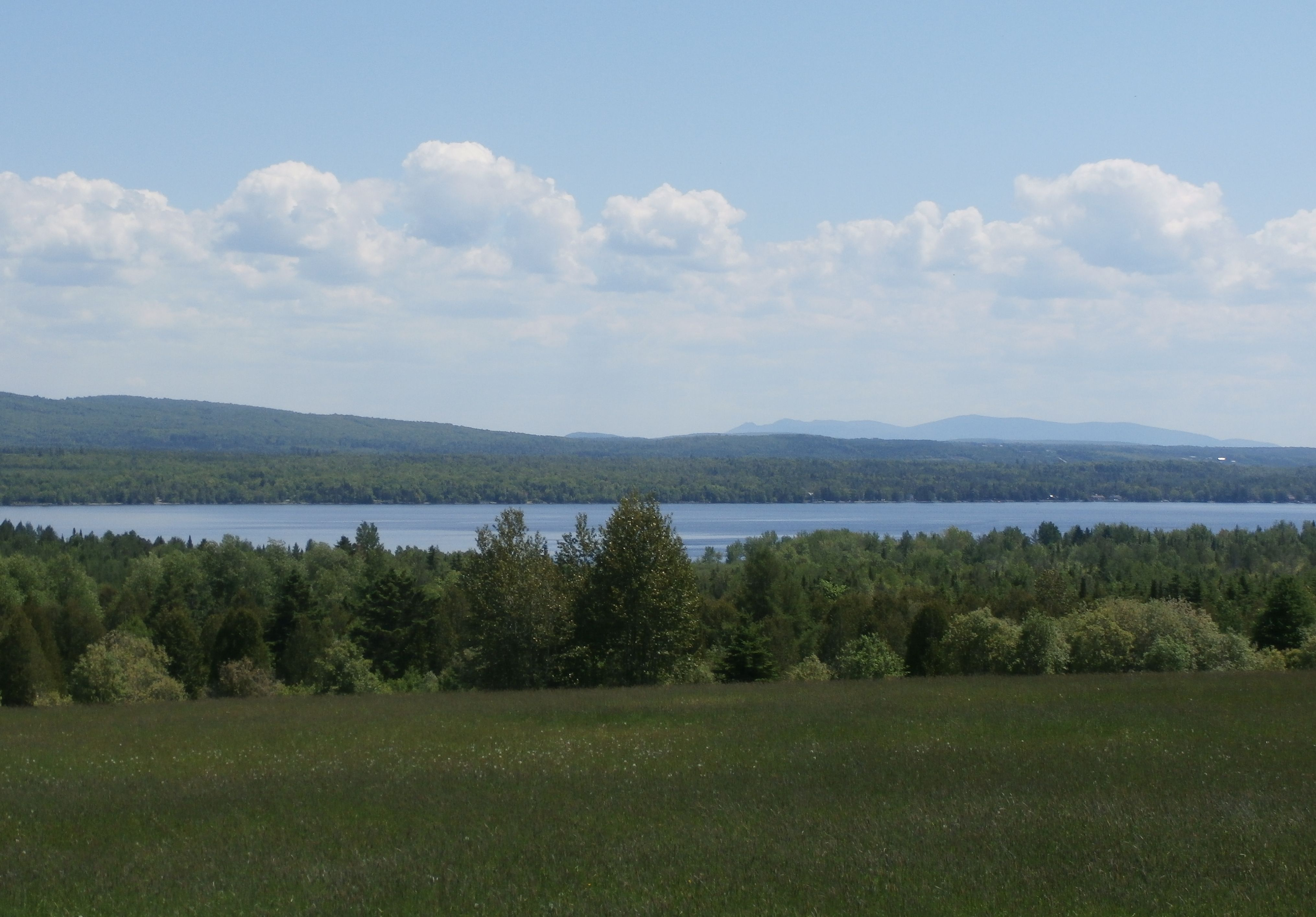
- Lac Louise seen from Route 112 near Weedon. Mont Mégantic is visible in the background.
- Interactive map of Lac Louise
- Location: Les Appalaches Regional County Municipality / Le Granit Regional County Municipality, Quebec
- Coordinates: 45°43′36″N 71°4′59″W
- Primary inflows: Saint-François River
- Primary outflows: Saint-François River
- Basin countries: Canada
- Max. length: 3.3 kilometres (2.1 mi)
- Max. width: 1.75 kilometres (1.09 mi)

The Lac Louise is a lake in Estrie located in the municipality of Weedon, in the Les Appalaches Regional County Municipality (MRC), in the administrative region of Chaudière-Appalaches, in Quebec, in Canada.

== Geography ==
Lac Louise is located in the Saint-François River valley just upstream of the confluence with the rivière au Saumon. The Saint-François River is its main tributary and outlet; the lake is a widening of the river. The rivière aux Canards also flows into it.

== See also ==
- Saint-Gérard, a municipality
- Weedon, a municipality
- Rivière au Saumon (Le Haut-Saint-François), a watercourse
- Saint-François River, a watercourse
- Rivière au Rat (Weedon), a watercourse
- Les Appalaches Regional County Municipality (MRC)
