= Joachim Bernier de La Brousse =

French poet

Joachim Bernier de la Brousse (c. 1580 in Nouaillé-Maupertuis – 1623), was a 17th-century baroque French poet.

Some sources say he was a lawyer while others say he was a banker in Poitiers, Bernier was raised by his uncle Deplanches, prior and sub-cantor of Sainte-Radegonde, who himself was a poet. A friend of the poet Jean Prévost, néo-Petrarchist, he drew inspiration from Ronsard. A collection of his Œuvres poétiques, including a tragicomedy in verse titled Les Heureuses Infortunes, was published in Poitiers in 1618. Some of his erotic poetry were published in collections of the time such as Les Délices satyriques, ou Suite du Cabinet des vers satyriques de ce temps in 1620.
