= Saints-Martyrs-Canadiens =

- Parish municipality
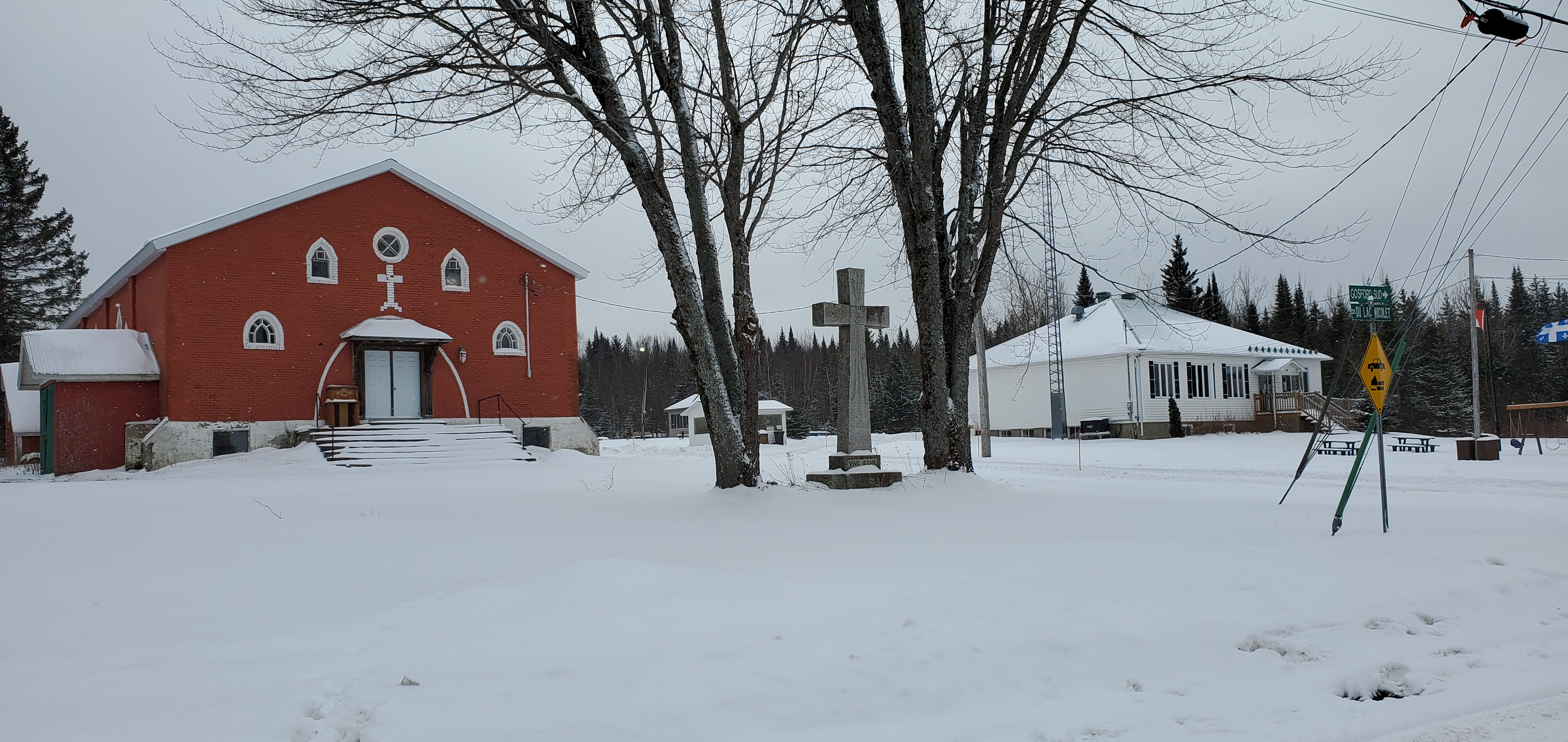

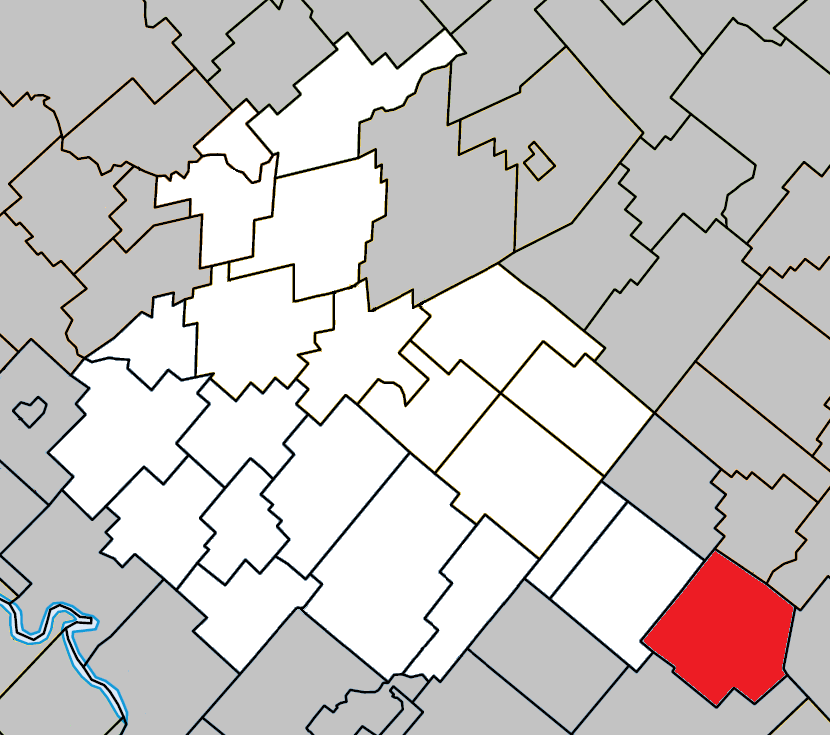
- Location within Arthabaska RCM.

- Location in southern Quebec.
- Coordinates: 45°51′N 71°32′W
- Country: Canada
- Province: Quebec
- Region: Centre-du-Québec
- RCM: Arthabaska
- Constituted: January 1, 1943

Government
  - Mayor: Michel Lequin
  - Federal riding: Richmond—Arthabaska—des-Sources
  - Prov. riding: Drummond–Bois-Francs

Area
  - Total: 117.70 km^{2} (45.44 sq mi)
  - Land: 111.40 km^{2} (43.01 sq mi)

Population (2021)
  - Total: 277
  - Density: 2.5/km^{2} (6.5/sq mi)
  - Pop 2016-2021: ▲9.1%
  - Dwellings: 269
- Time zone: UTC−5 (EST)
  - Summer (DST): UTC−4 (EDT)
- Postal code(s): G0P 1A1
- Area code: 819
- Highways: R-161
- Website: www.saints- martyrs-canadiens.ca

Saints-Martyrs-Canadiens (French pronunciation: [sɛ̃ maʁtiʁ kanadjɛ̃], lit. 'Canadian Holy Martyrs') is a parish municipality located in the Centre-du-Québec region of Quebec, Canada.

== History ==
Saints-Martyrs-Canadiens was created in 1943. The municipality was created from the merger of territories once part of Saint-Fortunat-de-Wolfestown, Saint-Jacques-le-Majeur-de-Wolfestown, Saint-Joseph-de-Ham-Sud, Garthby and Ham-Nord.

== Demographics ==
In the 2021 Census of Population conducted by Statistics Canada, Saints-Martyrs-Canadiens had a population of 277 living in 148 of its 269 total private dwellings, a change of 9.1% from its 2016 population of 254. With a land area of 111.4 km^{2} (43.0 sq mi), it had a population density of 2.5/km^{2} (6.4/sq mi) in 2021.
