= Disraeli, Quebec =

Disraeli
- City
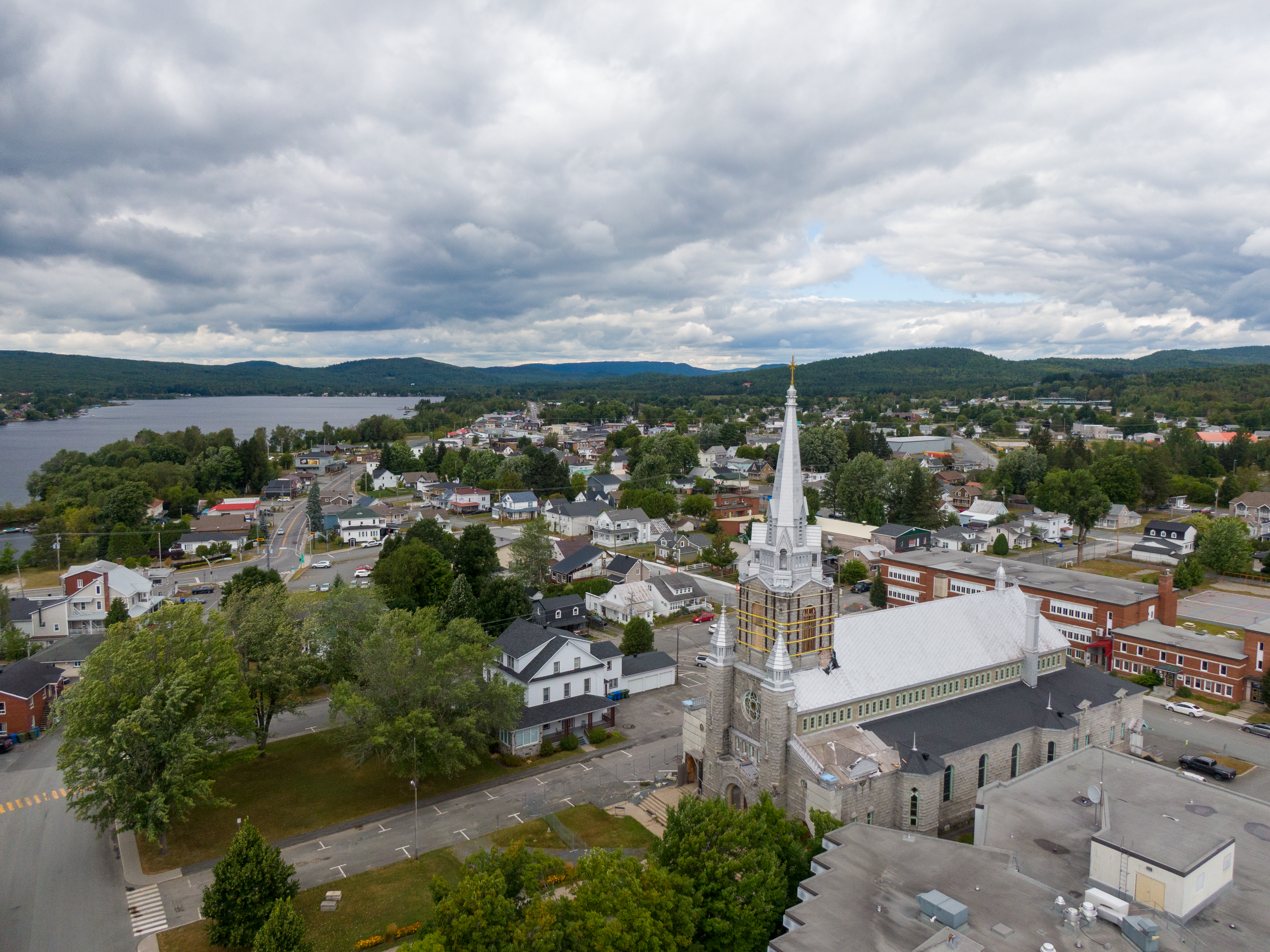
- Disraeli in 2025

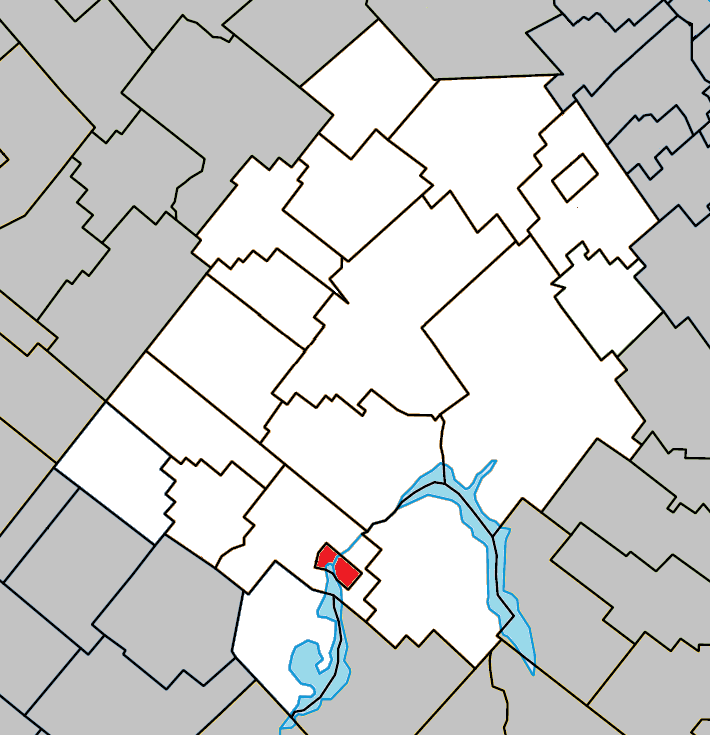
- Location within Les Appalaches RCM

- Location in province of Quebec
- Coordinates: 45°54′N 71°21′W
- Country: Canada
- Province: Quebec
- Region: Chaudière-Appalaches
- RCM: Les Appalaches
- Constituted: November 19, 1904

Government
  - Mayor: Charles Audet
  - Federal riding: Mégantic—L'Érable—Lotbinière
  - Prov. riding: Mégantic

Area
  - City: 8.20 km^{2} (3.17 sq mi)
  - Land: 6.91 km^{2} (2.67 sq mi)
  - Urban: 2.59 km^{2} (1.00 sq mi)

Population (2021)
  - City: 2,360
  - Density: 347.1/km^{2} (899/sq mi)
  - Urban: 2,228
  - Urban density: 859.3/km^{2} (2,226/sq mi)
  - Pop 2016–2021: ▲1.0%
  - Dwellings: 1,311
- Time zone: UTC−5 (EST)
  - Summer (DST): UTC−4 (EDT)
- Postal code(s): G0N 1E0
- Area codes: 418 and 581
- Highways: R-112; R-263
- Website: www.villededisraeli.com

The city of Disraeli is located in the Municipalité régionale de comté des Appalaches in Quebec, Canada. It is part of the Chaudière-Appalaches region and the population is 2,360 as of 2021. It was named after British statesman and writer Benjamin Disraeli.

The city of Disraeli forms an enclave in the territory of the parish of Disraeli and the two are separate legal entities.

== History ==
Originally, Disraeli was a unified municipality, created in 1883 from sections of Garthby and Stratford, under the name D'Israëli. 1904, a split was decided between the village and rest of the municipality which led to the creation of two municipalities, both named D'Israëli. One parish municipality and one village municipality full enclaved in the first. In 1953, the name D'Israëli was modified to Disraeli. In 1969 the status was changed to become a city.

== Demographics ==
In the 2021 Census of Population conducted by Statistics Canada, Disraeli had a population of 2,360 living in 1,226 of its 1,311 total private dwellings, a change of 1% from its 2016 population of 2,336. With a land area of 6.8 km^{2} (2.6 sq mi), it had a population density of 347.1/km^{2} (898.9/sq mi) in 2021.

== Attractions ==
The Church of Sainte-Luce was built between 1924 and 1926. It was designed by Louis-Napoléon Audet, an architect mainly active in the Sherbrooke region. This building replaced an earlier church that was destroyed in a fire on April 25, 1924. The original presbytery, built between 1890 and 1891, is still standing. The church's cemetery contains a dead house and a calvary. A grotto also commemorates the Lourdes apparitions.

In terms of residential architecture, houses constructed in the 19th century are found on Champoux Street and East Saint-Joseph Street. Other residential buildings from the same period are present in the neighbouring parish of Disraeli.
