= Lake Aylmer =

Lake in Quebec, Canada

Lake Aylmer Lac Aylmer
- Maskikogamac
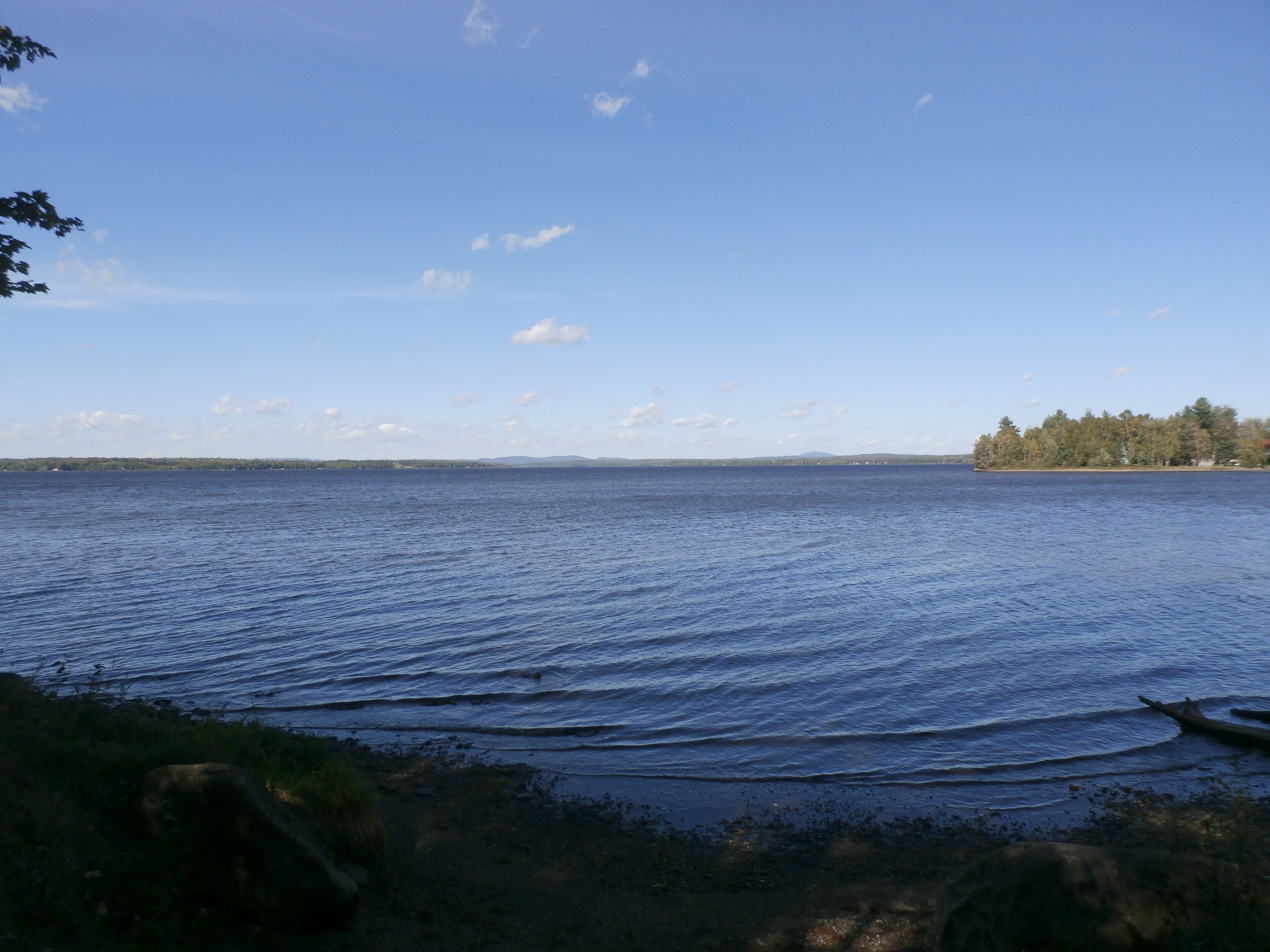
- Aylmer Lake as seen from Aylmer Estate

- Location within Quebec
- Coordinates: 45°48′52″N 71°22′36″W
- Max. length: 18 km (11 mi)
- Max. width: 5.8 km (3.6 mi)
- Surface area: 31.1 km^{2} (12.0 sq mi)
- Average depth: 36 m (118 ft)
- Settlements: Beaulac-Garthby, Disraeli (parish), Disraeli (city), Stratford, Saint-Gérard (Weedon)

Lake Aylmer (French: Lac Aylmer) is a lake located on the border of the Chaudière-Appalaches and Estrie regions of Quebec, Canada. It is shared by the Regional County Municipalities (RCM) of Les Appalaches, Le Granit and Le Haut-Saint-François.
