= Saint-Julien, Quebec =

Saint-Julien
- Municipality
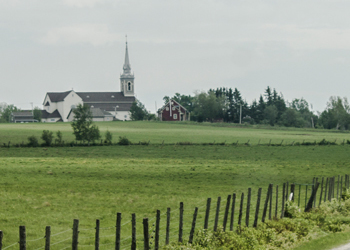
- Village of Saint-Julien

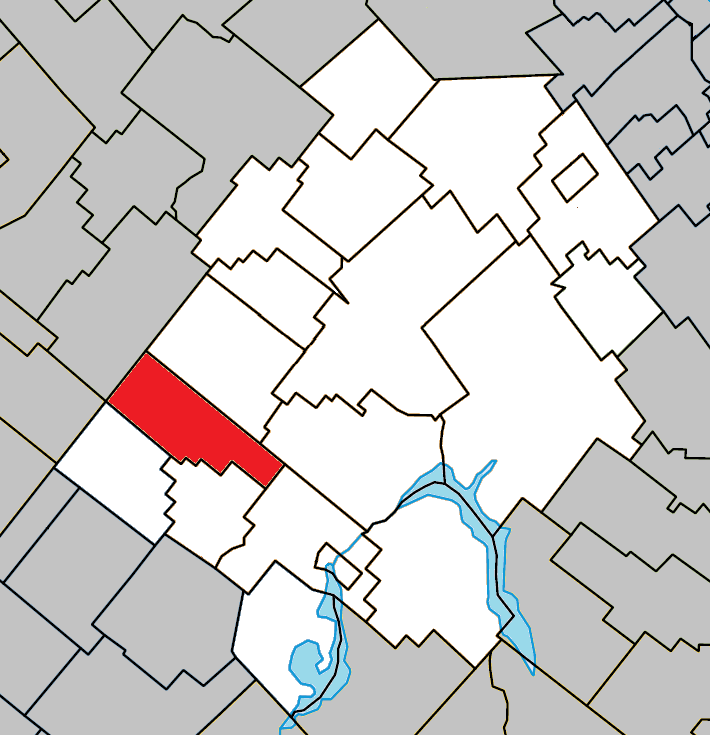
- Location within Les Appalaches RCM

- Location in southern Quebec
- Coordinates: 46°00′N 71°32′W
- Country: Canada
- Province: Quebec
- Region: Chaudière-Appalaches
- RCM: Les Appalaches
- Constituted: July 1, 1855

Government
  - Mayor: Francis Lehoux
  - Federal riding: Mégantic—L'Érable—Lotbinière
  - Prov. riding: Lotbinière-Frontenac

Area
  - Total: 82.80 km^{2} (31.97 sq mi)
  - Land: 81.70 km^{2} (31.54 sq mi)

Population (2021)
  - Total: 378
  - Density: 4.6/km^{2} (12/sq mi)
  - Pop 2016-2021: ▲0.5%
  - Dwellings: 203
- Time zone: UTC−5 (EST)
  - Summer (DST): UTC−4 (EDT)
- Postal code(s): G0N 1B0
- Area codes: 418 and 581
- Highways: R-216
- Website: www.st-julien.ca

Saint-Julien (French pronunciation: [sɛ̃ ʒyljɛ̃]) is a municipality located in the Municipalité régionale de comté des Appalaches in Quebec, Canada. It is part of the Chaudière-Appalaches region and the population is 378 as of 2021. It is named after Julien-Melchior Bernier, the first reverend of the parish between 1856 and 1863.
