= Saint-Jacques-le-Majeur-de-Wolfestown =

- Parish municipality
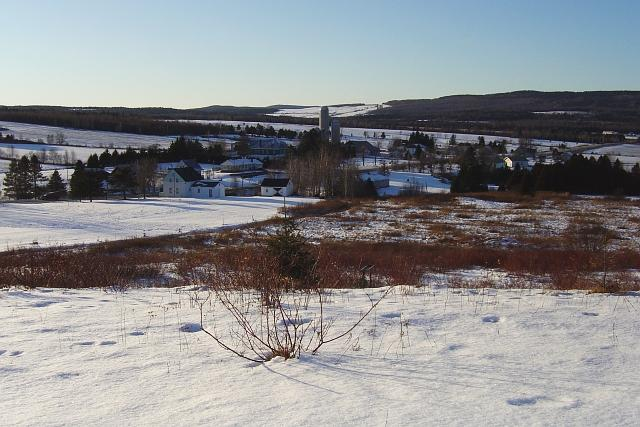

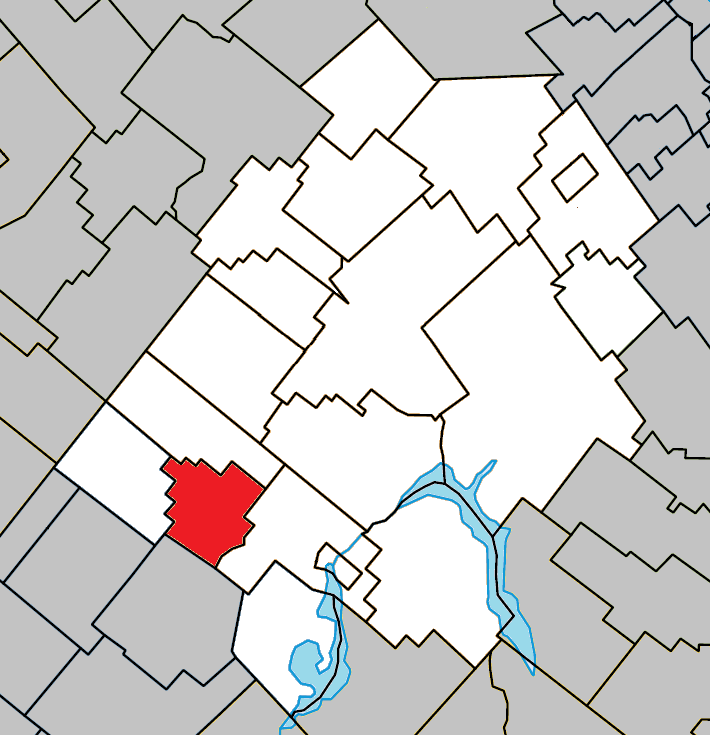
- Location within Les Appalaches RCM

- Location in southern Quebec
- Coordinates: 45°56′N 71°30′W
- Country: Canada
- Province: Quebec
- Region: Chaudière-Appalaches
- RCM: Les Appalaches
- Constituted: September 30, 1909

Government
  - Mayor: Steven Laprise
  - Federal riding: Mégantic—L'Érable—Lotbinière
  - Prov. riding: Lotbinière-Frontenac

Area
  - Total: 61.60 km^{2} (23.78 sq mi)
  - Land: 58.71 km^{2} (22.67 sq mi)

Population (2021)
  - Total: 186
  - Density: 3.2/km^{2} (8.3/sq mi)
  - Pop 2016-2021: ▼1.1%
  - Dwellings: 134
- Time zone: UTC−5 (EST)
  - Summer (DST): UTC−4 (EDT)
- Postal code(s): G0N 1E2
- Area codes: 418 and 581
- Highways: R-216; R-263
- Website: www.st-jacques-le-majeur-de-wolfestown.ca

Saint-Jacques-le-Majeur-de-Wolfestown is a parish municipality in Les Appalaches Regional County Municipality in the Chaudière-Appalaches region of Quebec, Canada. Its population is 186 as of the Canada 2021 Census.

It was named after one of Jesus' first disciples, James, son of Zebedee. Wolfestown was the name of the historic township in which it is located, which was named after General James Wolfe.

== History ==
The municipality was created in 1909 when parts of Leeds (now Kinnear’s Mills) and parts of Wolfestown (now Saint-Julien) were merged to create a new municipality.

== Demographics ==
In the 2021 Census of Population conducted by Statistics Canada, Saint-Jacques-le-Majeur-de-Wolfestown had a population of 186 living in 90 of its 134 total private dwellings, a change of −1.1% from its 2016 population of 188. With a land area of 58.71 km^{2} (22.67 sq mi), it had a population density of 3.2/km^{2} (8.2/sq mi) in 2021.
