= Weedon, Quebec =

Weedon
- Municipality
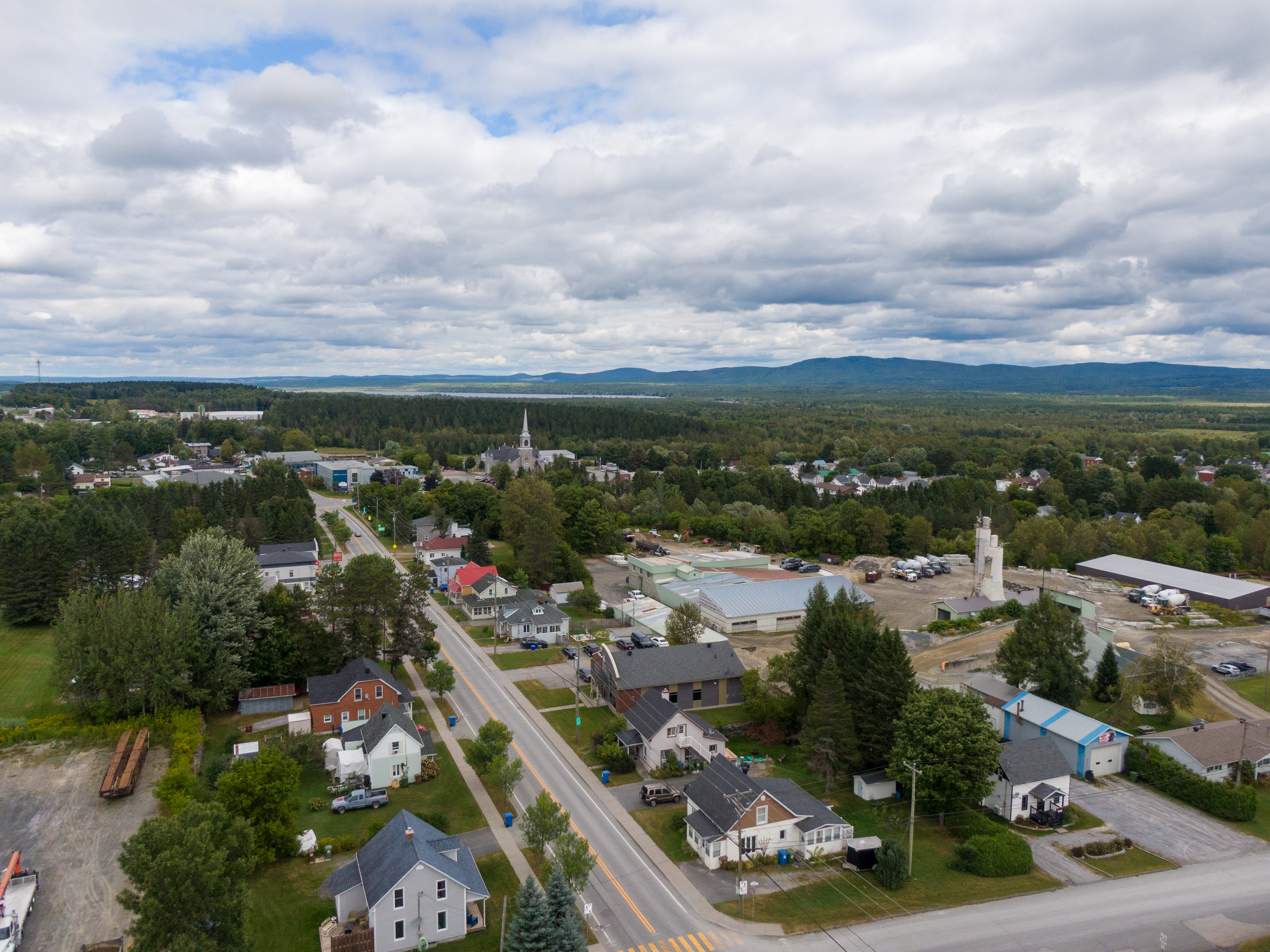

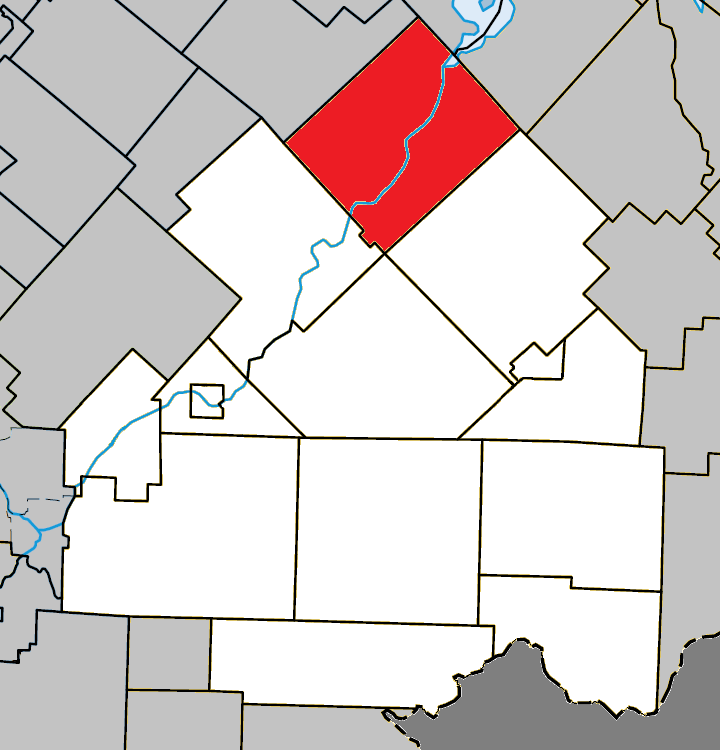
- Location within Le Haut-Saint-François RCM.

- Location in southern Quebec.
- Coordinates: 45°42′N 71°28′W
- Country: Canada
- Province: Quebec
- Region: Estrie
- RCM: Le Haut-Saint-François
- Constituted: February 9, 2000

Government
  - Mayor: Eugène Gagné
  - Federal riding: Compton—Stanstead
  - Prov. riding: Mégantic

Area
  - Total: 225.00 km^{2} (86.87 sq mi)
  - Land: 215.95 km^{2} (83.38 sq mi)

Population (2021)
  - Total: 2,667
  - Density: 12.4/km^{2} (32/sq mi)
  - Pop 2016-2021: ▼0.1%
  - Dwellings: 1,633
- Time zone: UTC−5 (EST)
  - Summer (DST): UTC−4 (EDT)
- Postal code(s): J0B 3J0
- Area code: 819
- Highways: R-112; R-161; R-257
- Website: www.weedon.ca

Weedon is a municipality of 2,667 people in Le Haut-Saint-François Regional County Municipality, in Quebec, Canada.

On February 9, 2000, the village municipality of Saint-Gérard merged into Weedon.

== Demographics ==
=== Population ===
Canada census – Weedon community profile

| | 2021 | 2016 |
| Population | 2,667 (-0.1% from 2016) | 2,670 (-0.5% from 2011) |
| Land area | 215.95 km^{2} (83.38 sq mi) | 216.42 km^{2} (83.56 sq mi) |
| Population density | 12.4/km^{2} (32/sq mi) | 12.3/km^{2} (32/sq mi) |
| Median age | 56.4 (M: 55.2, F: 57.6) | 55.1 (M: 53.7, F: 56.2) |
| Private dwellings | 1,633 (total) 1,283 (occupied) | 1,754 (total) |
| Median household income | $54,400 | $43,584 |

References: 2021 2016

Historical Census Data - Weedon, Quebec

| Year | Pop. | ±% |
|---|---|---|
| 2001 | 2,646 | — |
| 2006 | 2,739 | +3.5% |

| Year | Pop. | ±% |
|---|---|---|
| 2011 | 2,683 | −2.0% |
| 2016 | 2,670 | −0.5% |

| Year | Pop. | ±% |
|---|---|---|
| 2021 | 2,667 | −0.1% |

Source: Statistics Canada
