= Disraeli (parish) =

- Parish municipality
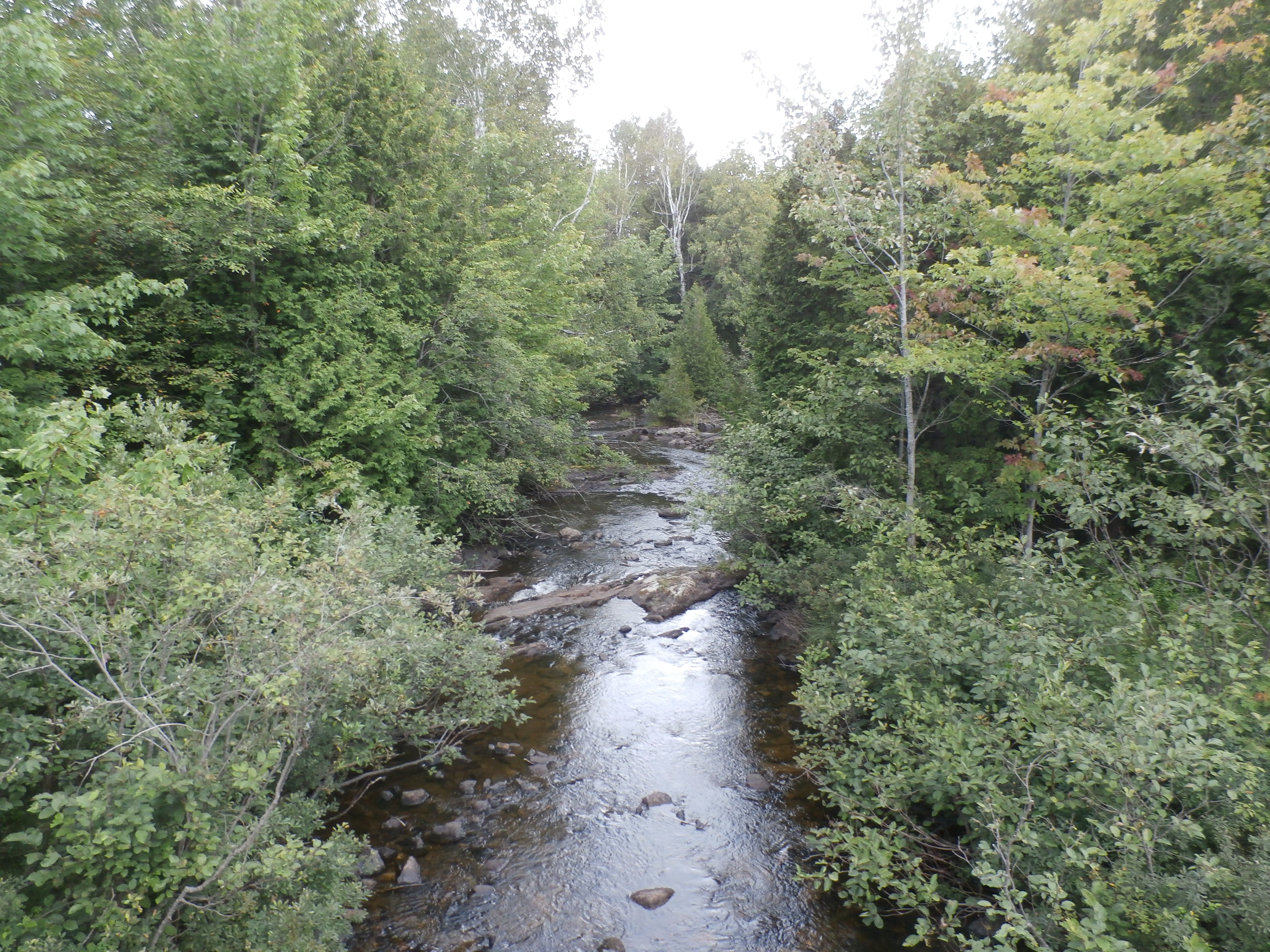

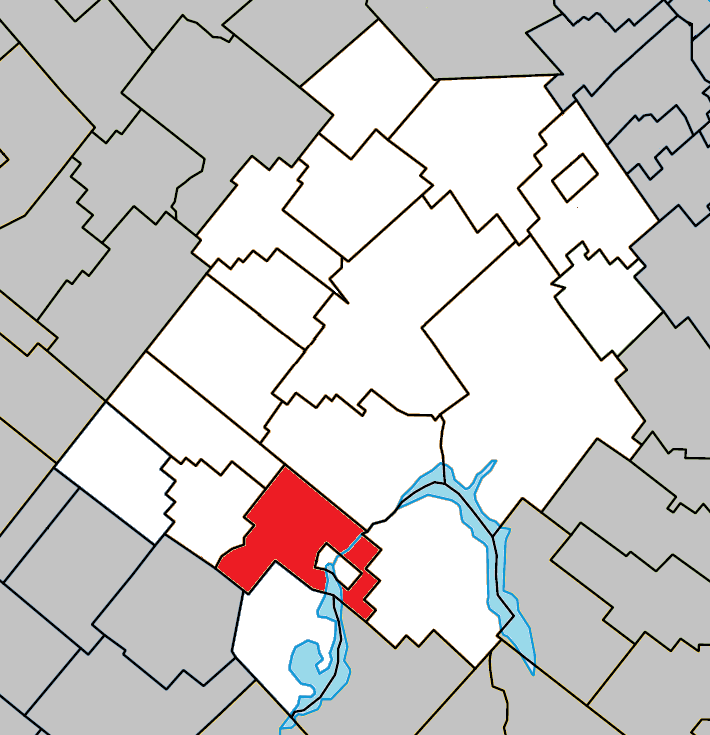
- Location within Les Appalaches RCM.

- Location in southern Quebec.
- Coordinates: 45°55′N 71°22′W
- Country: Canada
- Province: Quebec
- Region: Chaudière-Appalaches
- RCM: Les Appalaches
- Constituted: January 1, 1883
- Named for: Benjamin Disraeli

Government
  - Mayor: Jacynthe Patry
  - Federal riding: Mégantic—L'Érable—Lotbinière
  - Prov. riding: Mégantic

Area
  - Total: 97.50 km^{2} (37.64 sq mi)
  - Land: 92.53 km^{2} (35.73 sq mi)

Population (2021)
  - Total: 1,163
  - Density: 12.6/km^{2} (33/sq mi)
  - Pop 2016-2021: ▲3.6%
  - Dwellings: 754
- Time zone: UTC−5 (EST)
  - Summer (DST): UTC−4 (EDT)
- Postal code(s): G0N 1E0
- Area codes: 418 and 581
- Highways: R-112; R-263
- Website: www.paroisse disraeli.com

The parish of Disraeli is located in the Les Appalaches Regional County Municipality in the Chaudière-Appalaches region of Quebec, Canada. It had a population of 1,163 in the Canada 2021 Census.

It was named after British statesman and writer Benjamin Disraeli.

The city of Disraeli forms an enclave in the territory of the parish of Disraeli and the two are separate legal entities.

== History ==
The municipality was created in 1883, under the name D'Israëli, from the merger of territories formerly par of Garthby and Stratford. In 1904, the urban core of the municipality separated itself from the rural parts but also kept the name D'Israëli. In 1953, the name of D'Israëli was changed to become the parish municipality of Disreali, Some years later, the name was corrected to Disraeli.

== Geography ==
Located on a territory where lakes and forests are suitable for outdoor activities, Disraeli is the ninth largest subdivision within Les Appalaches Regional County Municipality and surrounds the city of Disraeli.

== Demographics ==
In the 2021 Census of Population conducted by Statistics Canada, Disraeli had a population of 1,163 living in 540 of its 754 total private dwellings, a change of 3.6% from its 2016 population of 1,123. With a land area of 92.53 km^{2} (35.73 sq mi), it had a population density of 12.6/km^{2} (32.6/sq mi) in 2021.
