= Beaulac-Garthby =

- Municipality
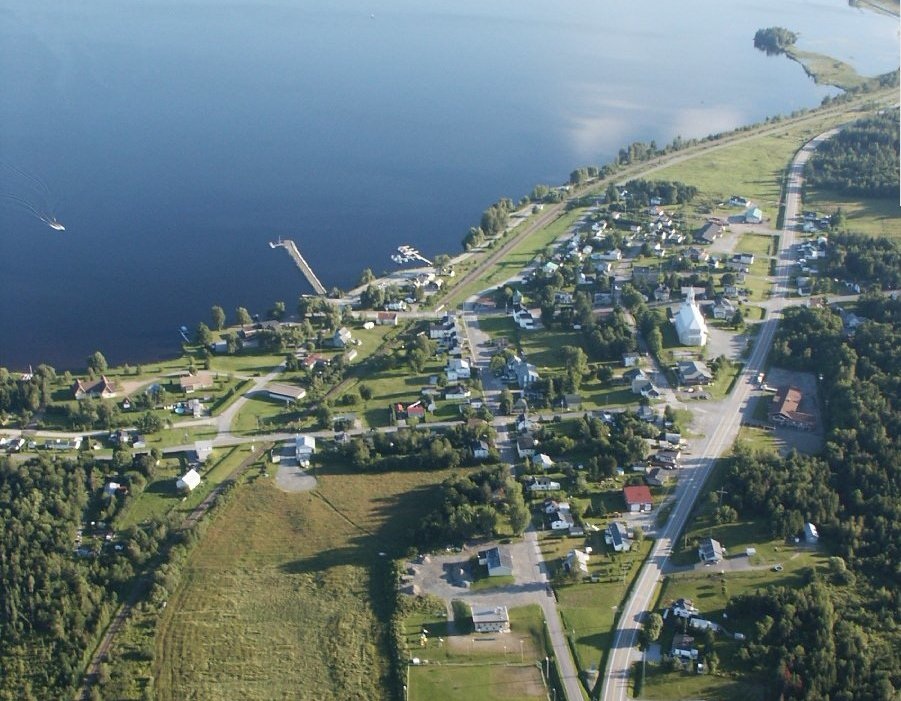
- Aerial view of Beaulac-Garthby

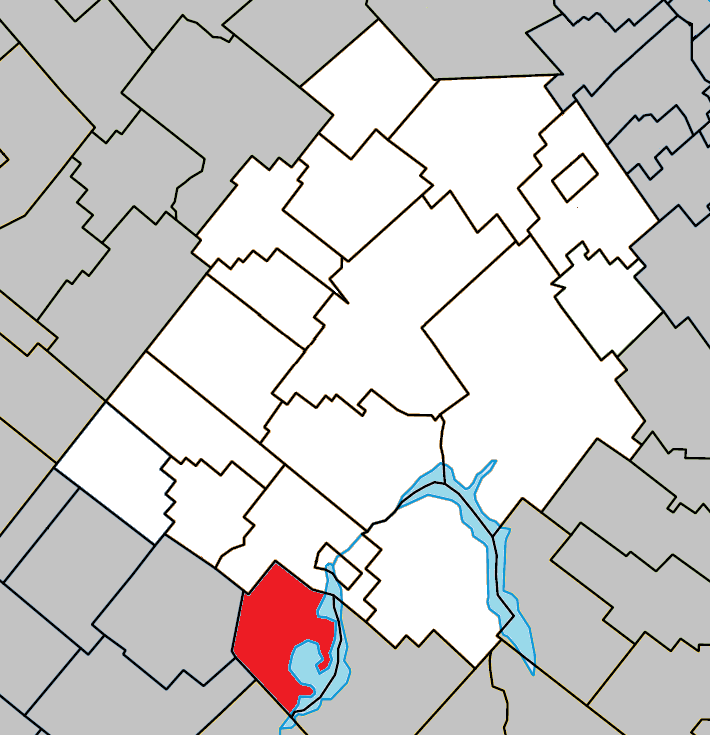
- Location within Les Appalaches RCM

- Location in province of Quebec
- Coordinates: 45°50′N 71°23′W
- Country: Canada
- Province: Quebec
- Region: Chaudière-Appalaches
- RCM: Les Appalaches
- Constituted: March 15, 2000

Government
  - Mayor: Christina Pinard
  - Federal riding: Mégantic—L'Érable—Lotbinière
  - Prov. riding: Mégantic

Area
  - Total: 93.90 km^{2} (36.25 sq mi)
  - Land: 75.96 km^{2} (29.33 sq mi)

Population (2021)
  - Total: 931
  - Density: 12.3/km^{2} (32/sq mi)
  - Pop 2016-2021: ▲2.9%
  - Dwellings: 814
- Time zone: UTC−5 (EST)
  - Summer (DST): UTC−4 (EDT)
- Postal code(s): G0Y 1B0
- Area codes: 418 and 581
- Highways: R-112; R-161
- Website: www.beaulac-garthby.com

Beaulac-Garthby is a municipality in Municipalité régionale de comté des Appalaches in Quebec, Canada. It is part of the Chaudière-Appalaches region and the population is 931 as of 2021.

== History ==
The municipality, located on Lake Aylmer, was created in 2000 following the amalgamation of the village of Beaulac and the township of Garthby.

== Demographics ==
Historical census populations – Beaulac-Garthby
Year	Pop.	±%
2001	816	—
2006	900	+10.3%
2011	888	−1.3%
2016	905	+1.9%
2021	931	+2.9%
Source: Statistics Canada
