= Rivière aux Ormes (Huron River tributary) =

River in Chaudière-Appalaches, Quebec (Canada)

- Location within Quebec

Location
- Country: Canada
- Province: Quebec
- Region: Chaudière-Appalaches
- MRC: Lotbinière Regional County Municipality

Physical characteristics
- Source: Agricultural and forest streams
  - location: Saint-Flavien
  - coordinates: 46.519952°N 71.586479°W
  - elevation: 128 metres (420 ft)
- Mouth: Huron River
  - location: Saint-Janvier-de-Joly
  - coordinates: 46.51944°N 71.75083°W
  - elevation: 66 metres (217 ft)
- Length: 15.2 kilometres (9.4 mi)

Basin features
- River system: St. Lawrence River
- Tributaries
  - left: (upstream) branche Coulombe, branche Rémi-Plante
  - right: (upstream)

The rivière aux Ormes (in English: Elm River) is a tributary of the east bank of the Huron River which constitutes a tributary of the south shore of the St. Lawrence River.

The Ormes river flows in the municipalities of Saint-Flavien, Saint-Janvier-de-Joly and Val-Alain, in the Lotbinière Regional County Municipality, in the administrative region of Chaudière-Appalaches, in Quebec, in Canada.

== Geography ==
The main neighboring watersheds of the Ormes river are:

- north side: Huron River, St. Lawrence River, Bois Franc-Pierreriche stream, Bourret stream;
- east side: Noire River (Huron River tributary), rivière aux Cèdres, Beaurivage River, rivière aux Pins;
- south side: rivière aux Cèdres, rivière aux Frênes, Henri River, rivière du Chêne;
- west side: rivière du Chêne.

The Ormes River has its source in the municipality of Saint-Flavien, north of the village, near the Pointe du Jour road.

From its source, the Rivière aux Ormes flows over 15.2 kilometres (9.4 mi) with a drop of 62 metres (203 ft), divided into the following segments:

- 4.6 kilometres (2.9 mi) westward, in the municipality of Saint-Flavien;
- 1.3 kilometres (0.81 mi) westward, to highway 20;
- 3.3 kilometres (2.1 mi) towards the west, up to the confluence of the "Branche Coulombe" stream (coming from the east);
- 6.0 kilometres (3.7 mi) westward, up to its confluence.

The Ormes River "flows into a bend in the river on the south bank of the Huron River in the municipality of Saint-Janvier-de-Joly. This confluence is located opposite the municipality of Saint-Édouard-de-Lotbinière.

== Toponymy ==
The toponym Rivière aux Ormes was formalized on December 5, 1968, at the Commission de toponymie du Québec.

== See also ==
- List of rivers of Quebec
