= Rivière aux Cèdres =

River in Chaudière-Appalaches, Quebec (Canada)

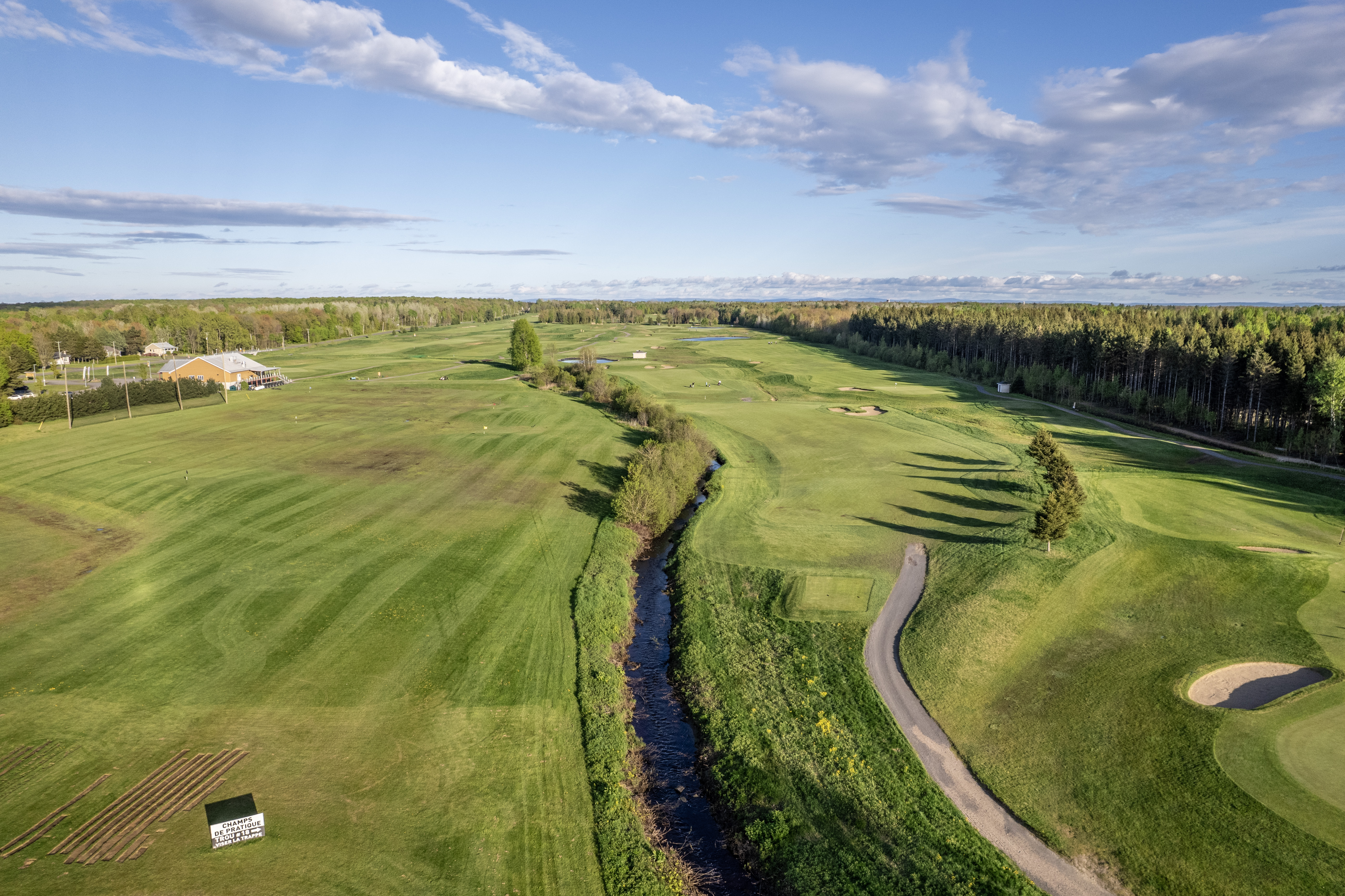

- Location within Quebec

Location
- Country: Canada
- Province: Quebec
- Region: Chaudière-Appalaches
- MRC: Lotbinière Regional County Municipality

Physical characteristics
- Source: Agricultural and forest streams
  - location: Saint-Agapit
  - coordinates: 46.51242°N 71.514362°W
  - elevation: 144 metres (472 ft)
- Mouth: Henri River
  - location: Val-Alain
  - coordinates: 46.48028°N 71.76417°W
  - elevation: 77 metres (253 ft)
- Length: 20.9 kilometres (13.0 mi)

Basin features
- River system: St. Lawrence River
- Tributaries
  - left: (upstream) ruisseau Bilodeau-Turgeon, Branche de Droite
  - right: (upstream)

The rivière aux Cèdres (in English: Cedar River) is a tributary of the east bank of the Henri River whose current flows successively into the rivière du Chêne and on the south shore of the St. Lawrence River.

The Cedars River flows through the municipalities of Saint-Agapit, Saint-Flavien, Dosquet, Saint-Janvier-de-Joly and Val-Alain, in the MRC of Lotbinière Regional County Municipality, in the administrative region of Chaudière-Appalaches, in Quebec, in Canada.

== Geography ==
The main neighboring watersheds of the Cèdres river are:

- North side: Huron River, rivière aux Ormes, St. Lawrence River;
- east side: Noire River, Beaurivage River, rivière aux Pins;
- south side: rivière aux Frênes, Henri River, rivière du Chêne;
- west side: Henri River, rivière du Chêne.

The Rivière aux Cèdres has its source in a marsh area straddling the intermunicipal boundaries of Saint-Agapit, Dosquet and Saint-Flavien. This head area is located 8.0 kilometres (5.0 mi) southwest of the center of the village of Saint-Agapit, at 5.5 kilometres (3.4 mi) west of the village center of Saint-Flavien and at 5.0 kilometres (3.1 mi) northeast of the center of the village of Dosquet.

From its head area, the Rivière aux Cèdres flows over 20.9 kilometres (13.0 mi) with a drop of 67 metres (220 ft), divided into the following segments:

- 100 metres (330 ft) towards the southwest in the marsh area in Saint-Agapit;
- 2.5 kilometres (1.6 mi) towards the southwest, in Saint-Flavien, crossing a marsh area, until the discharge of the "Right branch" de la rivière aux Cèdres";
- 1.9 kilometres (1.2 mi) heading west, to route 271;
- 1.5 kilometres (0.93 mi) westward, up to the limit of Dosquet;
- 1.1 kilometres (0.68 mi) towards the west, up to the limit of Saint-Janvier-de-Joly;
- 1.4 kilometres (0.87 mi) west, to a country road;
- 3.5 kilometres (2.2 mi) towards the west, until a country road, which it couples to 0.6 kilometres (0.37 mi) in the south of the village of Saint-Janvier-de-Joly;
- 2.8 kilometres (1.7 mi) westward, to highway 20;
- 6.1 kilometres (3.8 mi) westward, up to its confluence.

The Rivière aux Cèdres flows into a bend in the river on the east bank of the Henri River in the municipality of Val-Alain. This confluence is located downstream from the confluence of the rivière aux Frênes and upstream from the confluence of the Henri River.

== Toponymy ==
The toponym Rivière aux Cèdres was formalized on December 5, 1968, at the Commission de toponymie du Québec.

== See also ==
- List of rivers of Quebec
