= Henri River =

River in Chaudière-Appalaches, Quebec (Canada)

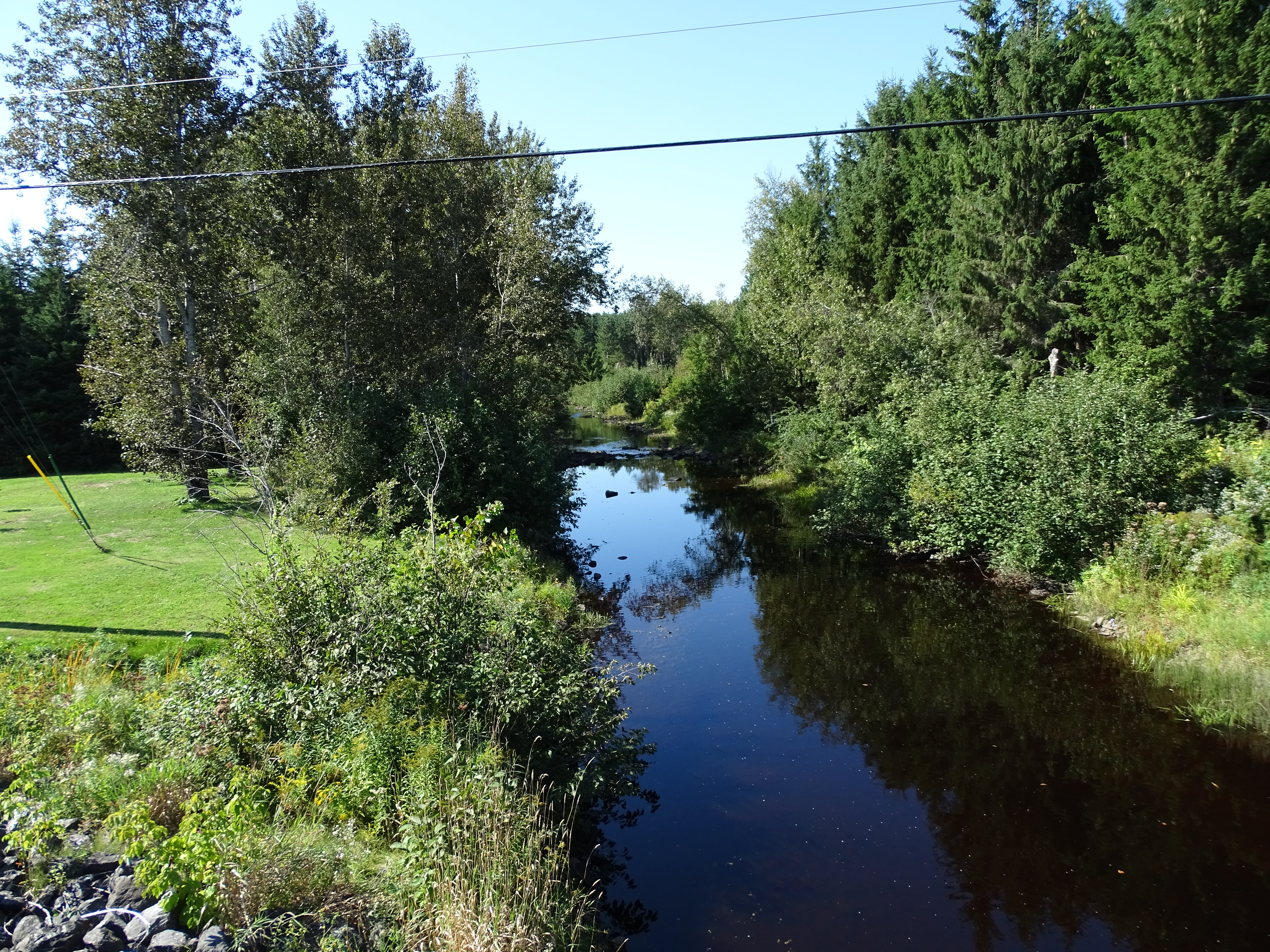

- Location within Quebec
- Native name: Rivière Henri (French)

Location
- Country: Canada
- Province: Quebec
- Region: Chaudière-Appalaches
- MRC: Lotbinière Regional County Municipality

Physical characteristics
- Source: Agricultural and forest streams
  - location: Saint-Gilles
  - coordinates: 46.4925°N 71.78611°W
  - elevation: 151 metres (495 ft)
- Mouth: Rivière du Chêne
  - location: Bécancour
  - coordinates: 46.49258°N 71.78551°W
  - elevation: 70 metres (230 ft)
- Length: 50.1 kilometres (31.1 mi)

Basin features
- River system: St. Lawrence River
- Tributaries
  - left: (upstream) ruisseau de l'Ours, calvette à la Vache, ruisseau Côté-Roy, ruisseau Cayer-Paré, ruisseau Desharnais.
  - right: (upstream) rivière aux Cèdres, rivière aux Frênes, ruisseau Corbeil, ruisseau Lavigne, ruisseau Breton-Laroche, Jean-Houde River, ruisseau Perron.

The Henri River (in French: rivière Henri) is a tributary of the east bank of the rivière du Chêne which empties on the south shore of the St. Lawrence River. The Henri River flows through the municipalities of Saint-Gilles, Sainte-Agathe-de-Lotbinière, Dosquet, Saint-Janvier-de-Joly, Val-Alain and Leclercville, in the Lotbinière Regional County Municipality, in the administrative region of Chaudière-Appalaches, in Quebec, in Canada.

== Geography ==
The main neighboring watersheds of the Henri River are:

- north side: Aulneuse River, rivière aux Cèdres, rivière aux Frênes, Huron River, Noire River (Huron River tributary), St. Lawrence River;
- east side: Jean-Houde River, Beaurivage River, Rouge River, Noire River, Saint-Georges River;
- south side: rivière du Chêne, Armagh River;
- west side: rivière du Chêne.

The Henri River takes its source on the west side of a marsh area in a forest zone in the southern part of the municipality of Saint-Gilles. This head zone is located on the west side of a marsh zone at the limit of Saint-Gilles and Saint-Patrice-de-Beaurivage. The head area of the river is located 5.6 kilometres (3.5 mi) northeast of the village of Sainte-Agathe-de-Lotbinière and 9.2 kilometres (5.7 mi) at the west of the village of Saint-Patrice-de-Beaurivage.

The course of the Henri river goes down with a drop of 81 metres (266 ft), on 50.1 kilometres (31.1 mi) according to the following segments:

Upper course of the Henri River (segment of 23.4 kilometres (14.5 mi))

From its source, the Henri River flows over 50.1 kilometres (31.1 mi) divided into the following segments:

- 1.6 kilometres (0.99 mi) north-west, crossing the boundary between Saint-Gilles and Sainte-Agathe-de-Lotbinière, until at route 218;
- 1.2 kilometres (0.75 mi) west, then north, in Sainte-Agathe-de-Lotbinière, to the same limit of Saint-Gilles;
- 4.4 kilometres (2.7 mi) towards the northeast, in Saint-Gilles;
- 11.1 kilometres (6.9 mi) westward, up to the limit between Saint-Gilles and Dosquet;
- 2.8 kilometres (1.7 mi) northwesterly, up to the confluence of Perron stream;
- 1.3 kilometres (0.81 mi) west, to route 271 that it crosses at 0.5 kilometres (0.31 mi) south of the center of village of Dosquet;
- 1.0 kilometre (0.62 mi) west, to route 116 which it crosses at 0.9 kilometres (0.56 mi) west of center of the village of Dosquet;

Lower part of the Henri River (segment of 26.7 kilometres (16.6 mi))

From route 116, the Henri river flows over:

- 4.9 kilometres (3.0 mi) westward, up to the limit between Dosquet and Joly;
- 2.9 kilometres (1.8 mi) west, up to a road of ranges 1 and 2;
- 6.4 kilometres (4.0 mi) west, to a country road, which it crosses at 4.4 kilometres (2.7 mi) west of the center of the village of Joly;
- 0.7 kilometres (0.43 mi) towards the north-west, to the limit between Joly and Val-Alain;
- 2.5 kilometres (1.6 mi) northwesterly, to highway 20;
- 8.1 kilometres (5.0 mi) (or 3.9 kilometres (2.4 mi) towards the northeast) winding up to the limit between Val-Alain and Leclercville (sector of "Sainte-Emmélie")
- 1.2 kilometres (0.75 mi) (or 0.7 kilometres (0.43 mi) in a direct line) north, winding up to its confluence.

The Henri river empties on the east bank of the rivière du Chêne in the locality "Les Trois-Fourches".

== Toponymy ==
The toponym Rivière Henri was formalized on December 5, 1968, at the Commission de toponymie du Québec.

== Gallery ==
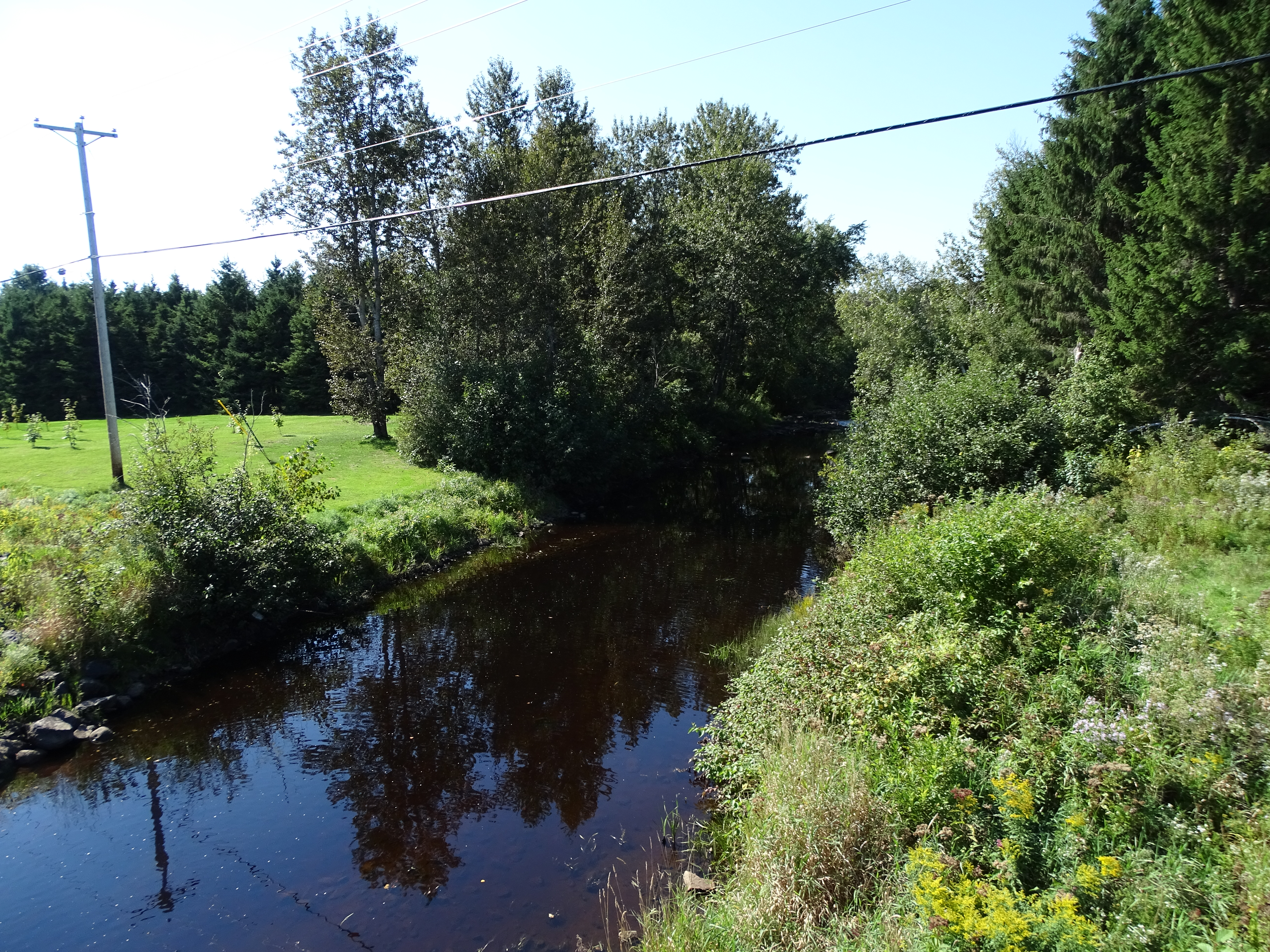
Henri River

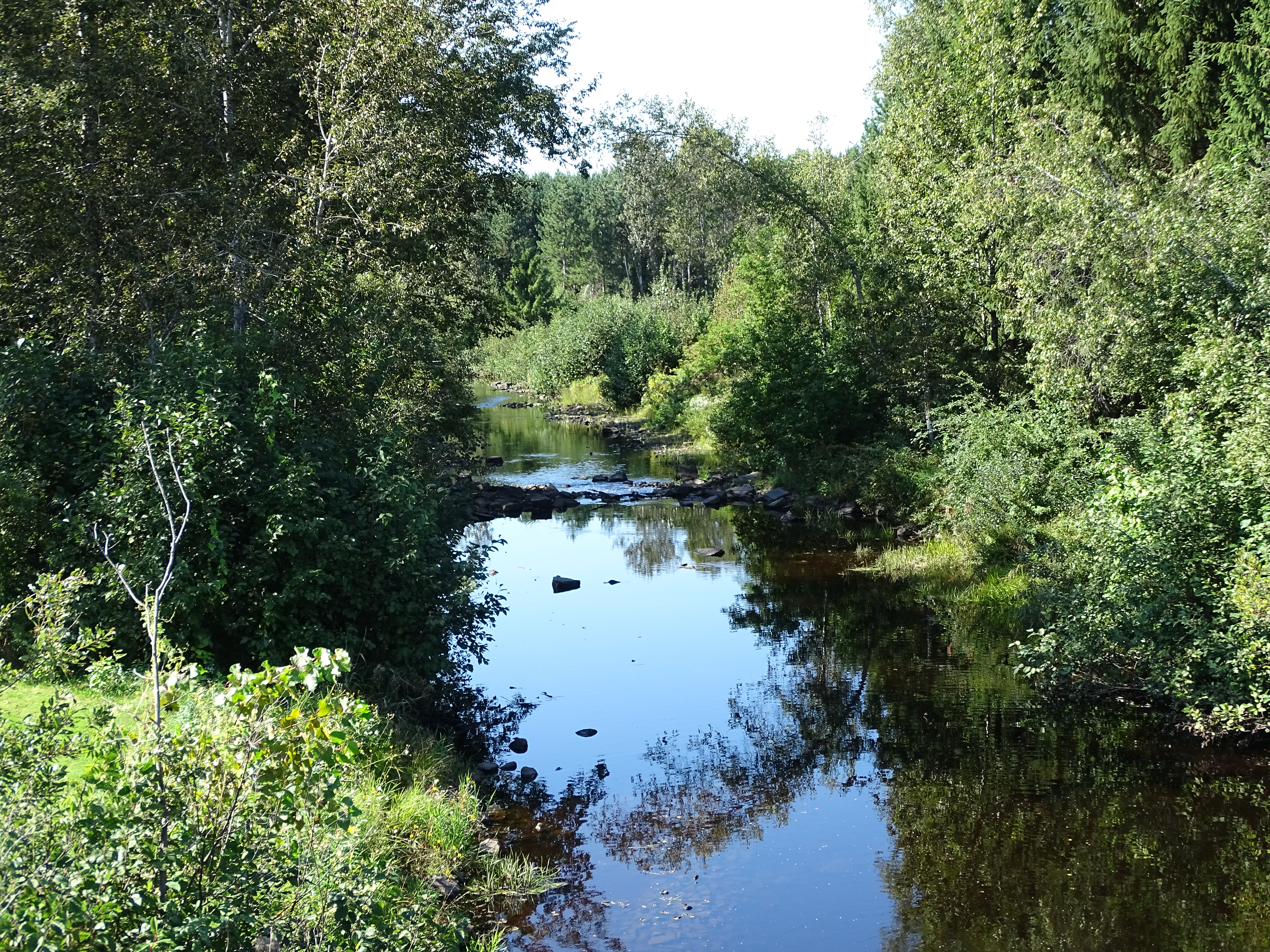
Henri River

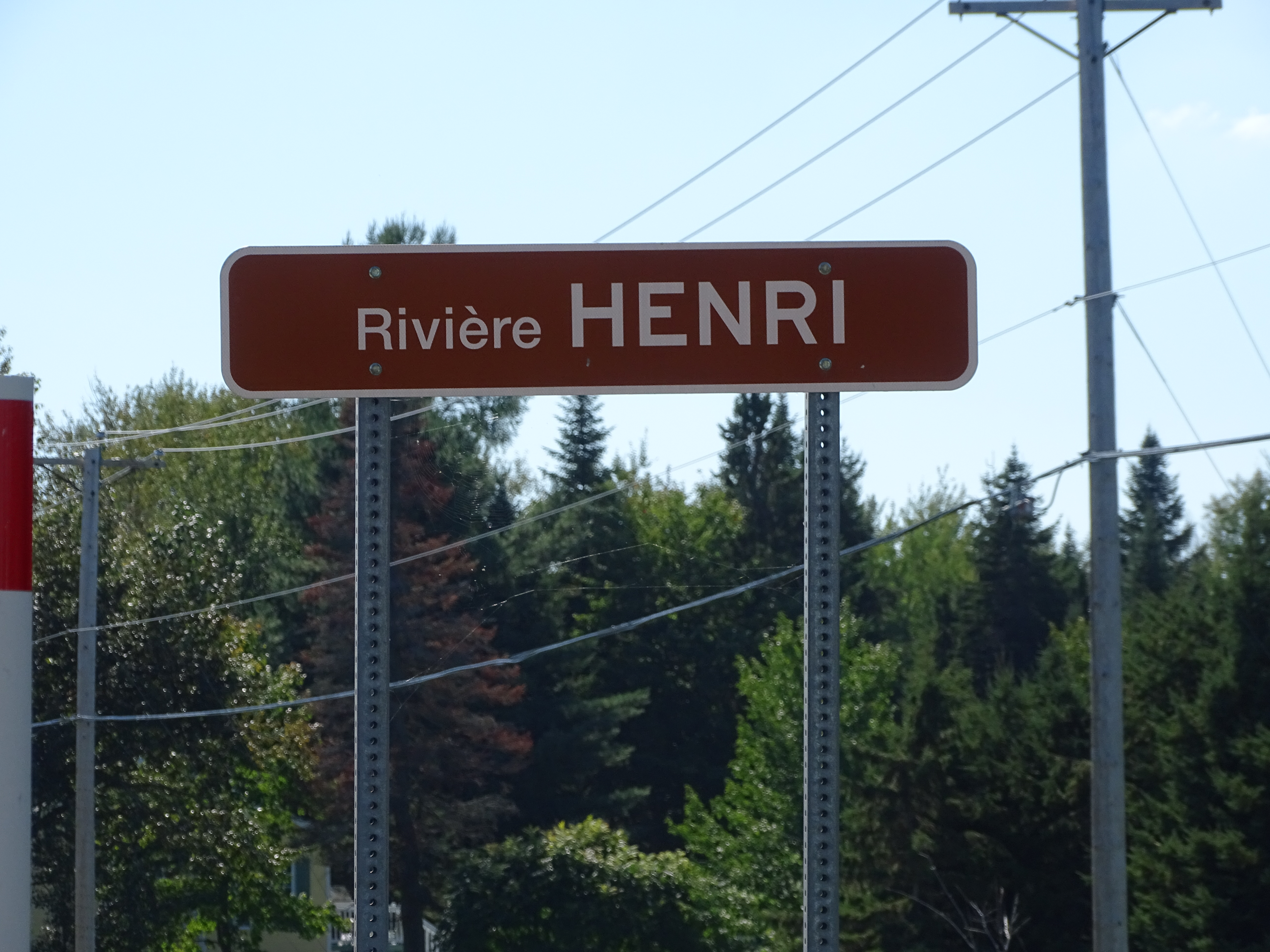
Sign

== See also ==
- List of rivers of Quebec
