= Rivière aux Frênes =

River in Chaudière-Appalaches, Quebec (Canada)

- Location within Quebec

Location
- Country: Canada
- Province: Quebec
- Region: Centre-du-Québec
- MRC: Bécancour Regional County Municipality

Physical characteristics
- Source: Agricultural and forest streams
  - location: Saint-Janvier-de-Joly
  - coordinates: 46.477535°N 71.656005°W
  - elevation: 122 metres (400 ft)
- Mouth: Henri River
  - location: Val-Alain
  - coordinates: 46.47583°N 71.76028°W
  - elevation: 90 metres (300 ft)
- Length: 9.0 kilometres (5.6 mi)

Basin features
- River system: St. Lawrence River
- Tributaries
  - left: (upstream)
  - right: (upstream)

The rivière aux Frênes is a tributary of the east bank of the Henri River whose current flows successively into the rivière du Chêne and on the south shore of the St. Lawrence River.

The rivière aux Frênes flows in the municipalities of Saint-Janvier-de-Joly and Val-Alain, in the Lotbinière Regional County Municipality, in the administrative region of Chaudière-Appalaches, in Quebec, in Canada.

== Geography ==
The main neighboring watersheds of the Rivière aux Frênes are:

- North side: Rivière aux Cèdres, Huron River, rivière aux Ormes, St. Lawrence River;
- east side: rivière aux Cèdres, Jean-Houde River, Henri River, Noire River, Beaurivage River, rivière aux Pins;
- south side: Henri River, rivière du Chêne;
- west side: Henri River, rivière du Chêne.

The Rivière aux Frênes takes its source from the village road 1.1 kilometres (0.68 mi) south-east of the village of Joly. From its source, the "rivière aux Frènes" flows on 9.0 kilometres (5.6 mi) between the Henri River (south side) and rivière aux Cèdres (north side). The "rivière aux Frènes" flows westward, with a drop of 32 metres (105 ft), crossing the railway, the 3rd and fourth rang West road, as well as the highway 20 (on the east side of exit 266).

The Rivière aux Frênes flows onto the east bank of the Henri River in the municipality of Val-Alain. This confluence is located upstream from the confluence of the rivière aux Cèdres and upstream from the confluence of the Henri River. This confluence is 2.0 km (1.2 mi) northwest of exit 266 of highway 20.

== Toponymy ==
The French term "Frêne" ("Ash" in English) turns out to be a species of leafy tree, comprising nine varieties.

The toponym “rivière aux Frênes” was made official on August 8, 1977, at the Commission de toponymie du Québec.

== See also ==
- List of rivers of Quebec
