= Huron River (rivière du Chêne tributary) =

River in Centre-du-Québec, Quebec (Canada)

- Location within Quebec
- Native name: Rivière Huron (French)

Location
- Country: Canada
- Province: Quebec
- Region: Centre-du-Québec
- MRC: L'Érable Regional County Municipality, Bécancour Regional County Municipality

Physical characteristics
- Source: Agricultural and forest streams
  - location: Laurier-Station and Notre-Dame-du-Sacré-Cœur-d'Issoudun
  - coordinates: 46.550756°N 71.646214°W
  - elevation: 90 metres (300 ft)
- Mouth: Rivière du Chêne
  - location: Leclercville (sector of Sainte-Emmélie)
  - coordinates: 46.50444°N 71.78667°W
  - elevation: 60 metres (200 ft)
- Length: 20.6 kilometres (12.8 mi)

Basin features
- River system: St. Lawrence River
- Tributaries
  - left: (upstream) rivière aux Ormes, cours d'eau de la Grande Ligne Seigneuriale, Tête de la Rivière Huron
  - right: (upstream) Noire River, ruisseau Le Rigolet, ruisseau Lambert, ruisseau Bois Franc-Pierreriche

The Huron River (in French: rivière Huron) is a tributary of the east bank of the rivière du Chêne which empties on the south shore of the St. Lawrence River. The Huron River flows through the municipalities of Laurier-Station, Notre-Dame-du-Sacré-Cœur-d'Issoudun, Saint-Édouard-de-Lotbinière, Saint-Janvier-de-Joly and Leclercville, in the Lotbinière Regional County Municipality, in the administrative region of Chaudière-Appalaches, in Quebec, in Canada.

== Geography ==
The main neighboring watersheds of the Huron River are:

- north side: Boucher arm, rivière du Bois Clair, Petit Saut river, Noire River, St. Lawrence River;
- east side: Bois Franc-Pierreriche stream, Bourret stream, Rouge River (Beaurivage River tributary), rivière aux Pins (Beaurivage River tributary), Beaurivage River;
- south side: Rivière aux Ormes (Huron River tributary), Rivière aux Cèdres, Rivière du Chêne;
- west side: rivière du Chêne.

The Huron River has its source at the confluence of the "Head of the Huron River" stream and a stream draining the northern part of the village of Laurier-Station. The "Tête de la Rivière Huron" flows on 7.6 kilometres (4.7 mi) east to the intermunicipal limit of Laurier-Station and Notre-Dame-du-Sacré-Cœur-d'Issoudun; this stream drains the northern part of Saint-Flavien and the eastern and southern area of Laurier-Station.

From its source, the Huron River flows over 20.6 kilometres (12.8 mi) with a drop of 30 metres (98 ft), divided into the following segments:

- 1.2 kilometres (0.75 mi) northwesterly, then northeasterly, crossing route 271, to the confluence of the Bois Franc-Pierriche stream;
- 2.6 kilometres (1.6 mi) north-west, up to route 271;
- 3.7 kilometres (2.3 mi) westward, up to the limit of Saint-Janvier-de-Joly;
- 3.0 kilometres (1.9 mi) towards the south-west, marking the limit of Saint-Janvier-de-Joly and Notre-Dame-du-Sacré-Cœur-d'Issoudun, to the intermunicipal limit of Saint-Édouard-de-Lotbinière;
- 8.9 kilometres (5.5 mi) (or 5.0 kilometres (3.1 mi) in a direct line) towards the southwest, winding up to the limit of Leclercville;
- 1.2 kilometres (0.75 mi) towards the west, in Leclercville until its confluence.

The Huron River empties on the east bank of the rivière du Chêne in the Lucieville Range, in Leclercville.

== Toponymy ==
The toponym Rivière Huron was formalized on December 5, 1968, at the Commission de toponymie du Québec.

== See also ==
- List of rivers of Quebec
