= Rivière du Bois Clair =

River in Chaudière-Appalaches, Quebec, Canada

- Location within Quebec

Location
- Country: Canada
- Province: Quebec
- Region: Chaudière-Appalaches
- MRC: Lotbinière Regional County Municipality

Physical characteristics
- Source: Agricultural and forest streams
  - location: Sainte-Croix
  - coordinates: 46.58742°N 71.73017°W
  - elevation: 81 metres (266 ft)
- Mouth: Rivière du Chêne
  - location: Saint-Édouard-de-Lotbinière
  - coordinates: 46.55416°N 71.885°W
  - elevation: 31 metres (102 ft)
- Length: 13.3 kilometres (8.3 mi)

Basin features
- River system: St. Lawrence River
- Tributaries
  - left: (upstream) ruisseau Allaire, ruisseau des Revend, Bras des Boucher
  - right: (upstream)

The rivière du Bois Clair (in English: light wood river) is a tributary of the east bank of the rivière du Chêne which flows on the south shore of the St. Lawrence River. The Bois Clair river flows in the municipalities of Sainte-Croix-de-Lotbinière and Saint-Édouard-de-Lotbinière, in the Lotbinière Regional County Municipality, in the administrative region of Chaudière-Appalaches, Quebec, Canada.

== Geography ==
The main neighboring watersheds of the Bois Clair river are:

- north side: Jean-Baptiste stream, Saint-Eustache stream, St. Lawrence River;
- east side: Petit Saut River, Huron River, Bois Franc stream;
- south side: Bras des Boucher, rivière aux Cèdres, rivière aux Ormes, Henri River;
- west side: rivière du Chêne.

The Bois Clair river "has its source at 3e rang south in the municipality of Sainte-Croix. This area also forms the head of the Barbin stream flowing to the north to the St. Lawrence River and a stream flowing east to the Petit Saut River.

From its head area, the Bois Clair river "flows over 13.3 kilometres (8.3 mi) with a drop of 50 metres (160 ft), divided into the following segments:

- 0.6 kilometres (0.37 mi) southwesterly in Sainte-Croix, to the western limit of the municipality;
- 2.2 kilometres (1.4 mi) southwesterly, then northwesterly, to route 226 (designated "route Principale"), which it cut at 2.6 kilometres (1.6 mi) east of the village of Saint-Édouard-de-Lotbinière;
- 6.2 kilometres (3.9 mi) west, intersecting Route Laliberté and Route Ouellet, to Route Soucy, which it intersects at the village of Saint-Édouard-de-Lotbinière;
- 4.3 kilometres (2.7 mi) towards the west, crossing the Bélanger road, until its confluence.

The Bois Clair river "flows on the east bank of the rivière du Chêne in Saint-Édouard-de-Lotbinière. This confluence is located opposite the rang du Portage of Leclercville, at 0.7 kilometres (0.43 mi) downstream of the Chêne River bridge (route 226), south-east of the village of Leclercville and south of the village of Lotbinière.

== Toponymy ==
The term Boisclair is a family name of French origin.

The toponym Rivière du Bois Clair was formalized on December 5, 1968, at the Commission de toponymie du Québec.

== See also ==
- List of rivers of Quebec
