= Rivière du Chêne =

River in Chaudière-Appalaches, Quebec, Canada

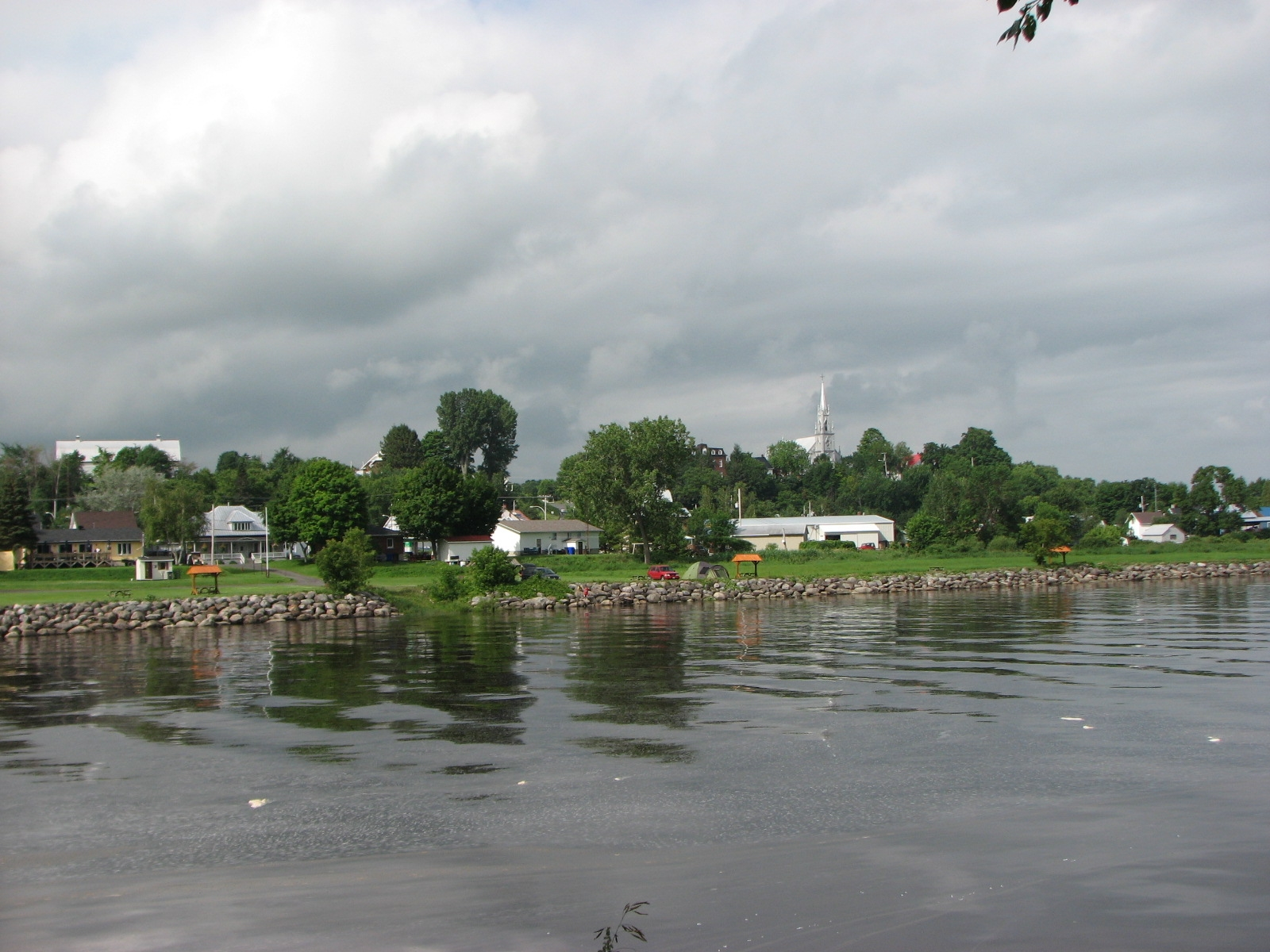
- Rivière du Chêne at Leclercville

- Location within Quebec

Location
- Country: Canada
- Province: Quebec
- Region: Chaudière-Appalaches
- MRC: L'Érable Regional County Municipality, Lotbinière Regional County Municipality

Physical characteristics
- Source: Agricultural and forest streams
  - location: Sainte-Agathe-de-Lotbinière
  - coordinates: 46.395318°N 71.385586°W
  - elevation: 181 metres (594 ft)
- Mouth: St. Lawrence River
  - location: Leclercville
  - coordinates: 46.57472°N 71.99861°W
  - elevation: 5 metres (16 ft)
- Length: 80.6 kilometres (50.1 mi)

Basin features
- River system: St. Lawrence River
- Tributaries
  - left: (upstream) ruisseau Beaudet, ruisseau Bernier, ruisseau de l'Ours, ruisseau Grégoire, ruisseau Parent, Bras d'Edmond, ruisseau Marion, Bras de Marie, rivière aux Chevreuils, cours d'eau Bouchard, cours d'eau Béland, ruisseau Moffet, Saint-Georges River.
  - right: (upstream) ruisseau des Gagnon, ruisseau du Petit Saint-Charles, ruisseau Pilote, rivière du Bois Clair, Huron River, Henri River, ruisseau Lambert, ruisseau Bergeron, ruisseau Mongrain.

The rivière du Chêne (in English: Oak River) is a tributary of the south shore of the St. Lawrence River. This river flows in the municipalities of Sainte-Agathe-de-Lotbinière, Saint-Gilles, Dosquet, Lyster (MRC de L'Érable Regional County Municipality), Saint-Janvier-de-Joly, Val-Alain, Saint-Édouard-de-Lotbinière, Lotbinière and Leclercville, in the Lotbinière Regional County Municipality, in the administrative region of Chaudière-Appalaches, in Quebec, in Canada.

== Geography ==
The main neighboring watersheds of the Chêne River are:

- North side: St. Lawrence River;
- East side: rivière du Bois Clair, rivière aux Ormes, bas des Boucher, rivière du Petit Sault, Henri River, Noire River, Beaurivage River, Rouge River, Filkars River;
- South side: Bécancour River, Armagh River;
- West side: Petite rivière du Chêne, St. Lawrence River.

The Chêne River has its source in an agricultural area west of the village of Sainte-Agathe-de-Lotbinière, northeast of route 271 and south from route 218. Near its mouth on the Saint Lawrence it flows past the Moulin du Portage, a historical water-powered flour mill.

The Chêne River flows over 80.6 kilometres (50.1 mi), with a drop of 176 metres (577 ft), divided into the following segments:

Upper course of the river (segment of 21.0 kilometres (13.0 mi))

From its head area, the Chêne River flows over:

- 2.1 kilometres (1.3 mi) east, to a country road;
- 3.6 kilometres (2.2 mi) north-west, up to route 218;
- 4.3 kilometres (2.7 mi) towards the west, cutting the southern part of the territory of Saint-Gilles for about 100 meters, up to route 271;
- 5.3 kilometres (3.3 mi) westward, to the municipal limit of Sainte-Agathe-de-Lotbinière and Lyster;
- 3.8 kilometres (2.4 mi) to the northwest, crossing the northern part of Lyster;
- 1.9 kilometres (1.2 mi) heading west, to route 116, in the municipality of Dosquet.

Intermediate course of the river (segment of 34.1 kilometres (21.2 mi))

From Route 116, the Chêne River flows over:

- 3.6 kilometres (2.2 mi) northwesterly, curving northeasterly, in Dosquet, to the municipal limit of Lyster;
- 0.7 kilometres (0.43 mi) west into Lyster, to a road;
- 4.4 kilometres (2.7 mi) westward, to the limit of Lyster and Saint-Janvier-de-Joly;
- 0.6 kilometres (0.37 mi) westward, in the municipality of Saint-Janvier-de-Joly;
- 1.7 kilometres (1.1 mi) west, in the municipality of Lyster, to the confluence of the rivière aux Chevreuils;
- 0.9 kilometres (0.56 mi) west, to a road;
- 3.8 kilometres (2.4 mi) west, to the road bridge in the village of Val-Alain;
- 4.6 kilometres (2.9 mi) (or 2.8 kilometres (1.7 mi) in a direct line) northwest, to the highway 20 bridge;
- 6.4 kilometres (4.0 mi) (or 4.0 kilometres (2.5 mi) in a direct line) northward, up to the limit between the municipalities of Val-Alain and Leclercville;
- 7.4 kilometres (4.6 mi) (or 3.2 kilometres (2.0 mi) in a direct line) towards the northeast, winding up to the confluence of the Henri river, that is to say the locality "Les Trois-Fourches ".

Lower course of the river (segment of 25.5 kilometres (15.8 mi))

From the confluence with the Henri River located in Leclercville, the Chêne River flows over:

- 7.5 kilometres (4.7 mi) (or 4.4 kilometres (2.7 mi) in a direct line) towards the north-west, passing through the lieu-dit Fonds de Badoche and to Île à Soucy, winding to route 226; the last 1.3 kilometres (0.81 mi) of this segment constitutes the municipal boundary between Saint-Édouard-de-Lotbinière and Leclercville;
- 16.2 kilometres (10.1 mi) (or 7.8 kilometres (4.8 mi) in a direct line) towards the west, up to the limit of the village municipality of Leclercville;
- 1.4 kilometres (0.87 mi) northwesterly, zigzagging through Leclercville to route 132;
- 0.4 kilometres (0.25 mi) north-west, up to its confluence.

The Chêne River flows over the Chêne Flats, on the south shore of the estuary of Saint Lawrence, in the village of Leclercville. Its confluence is located at the tip of Leclercville, west of the center of the village of Lotbinière, east of the center of the village of Deschaillons-sur-Saint-Laurent and west of the village of Saint-Édouard. It is also located at 3.3 kilometres (2.1 mi) east of the confluence of the Petite rivière du Chêne.

== Toponymy ==
The toponym Rivière du Chêne was formalized on December 5, 1968, at the Commission de toponymie du Québec.

== See also ==
- List of rivers of Quebec
