= Noire River (Huron River tributary) =

River in Chaudière-Appalaches, Quebec (Canada)

- Location within Quebec
- Native name: Rivière Noire (French)

Location
- Country: Canada
- Province: Quebec
- Region: Chaudière-Appalaches
- MRC: Lotbinière Regional County Municipality

Physical characteristics
- Source: Agricultural and forest streams
  - location: Laurier-Station and Notre-Dame-du-Sacré-Cœur-d'Issoudun
  - coordinates: 46.596144°N 71.626821°W
  - elevation: 93 metres (305 ft)
- Mouth: Huron River
  - location: Notre-Dame-du-Sacré-Cœur-d'Issoudun
  - coordinates: 46.56166°N 71.70306°W
  - elevation: 89 metres (292 ft)
- Length: 6.8 kilometres (4.2 mi)

Basin features
- River system: St. Lawrence River
- Tributaries
  - left: (upstream)
  - right: (upstream)

The Noire River (in French: rivière Noire) is a tributary of the north shore of the Huron River. The latter's current flows into the rivière du Chêne which flows onto the south shore of the St. Lawrence River.

The Rivière Noire flows through the municipalities of Notre-Dame-du-Sacré-Cœur-d'Issoudun and Sainte-Croix-de-Lotbinière, in the Lotbinière Regional County Municipality, in the administrative region of Chaudière-Appalaches, in Québec, in Canada.

== Geography ==
The main neighboring watersheds of the Black River are:

- north side: Petit Saut River, St. Lawrence River;
- east side: Bois Franc stream, Bourret stream, Noire River, Rouge River (Beaurivage River tributary), rivière aux Pins, Beaurivage River;
- south side: Bois Franc-Pierreriche stream, Tête de la Rivière Huron, rivière aux Cèdres, Henri River, rivière du Chêne;
- west side: Huron River, rivière du Chêne.

The Black River has its source in Notre-Dame-du-Sacré-Cœur-d'Issoudun. This area is located 4.7 kilometres (2.9 mi) south of the south shore of the St. Lawrence River, 8.3 kilometres (5.2 mi) southwest of the village center of Saint-Antoine-de-Tilly, at 8.6 kilometres (5.3 mi) west of the center of the village of Saint-Apollinaire, at 1.9 kilometres (1.2 mi) north of the village of Notre-Dame-du-Sacré-Cœur-d'Issoudun and 7.9 kilometres (4.9 mi) north of the center of the village of Laurier-Station.

From its source, the Rivière Noire flows on 6.8 kilometres (4.2 mi) towards the south-west including 1.4 kilometres (0.87 mi) (divided into two segments) in Sainte-Croix-de-Lotbinière. Its course intersects route 271.

The confluence of the Rivière Noire is located at the Route Frenette bridge connecting the route du 5e Rang and the route du sixth Rang, in the municipality of Notre-Dame-du-Sacré-Cœur-d'Issoudun. This confluence is located only 140 metres (460 ft) from the limit of Saint-Janvier-de-Joly.

== Toponymy ==
The toponym "rivière Noire" was made official on August 8, 1977, at the Commission de toponymie du Québec.

== See also ==
- List of rivers of Quebec
