= List of highways numbered 275 =

Route 275 or Highway 275 may refer to:

== United Kingdom ==
- M275 motorway

== Canada ==
- Manitoba Provincial Road 275
- New Brunswick Route 275
- Quebec Route 275

== India ==
- National Highway 275 (India)
- State Highway 275 (Maharashtra)

== Japan ==
- Japan National Route 275

== United States ==
- Interstate 275 (multiple highways)
- U.S. Route 275
- Alabama State Route 275
- California State Route 275
- Connecticut Route 275
- Florida State Road 275 (former)
- Georgia State Route 275
- Maryland Route 275
- Minnesota State Highway 275
- Montana Secondary Highway 275
- New Mexico State Road 275
- New York State Route 275
- Tennessee State Route 275
- Texas State Highway 275
  - Texas State Highway Loop 275
  - Farm to Market Road 275 (Texas)
- Utah State Route 275

Preceded by 274	Lists of highways 275	Succeeded by 276
