= List of highways numbered 271 =

The following highways are numbered 271:

== Canada ==
- Manitoba Provincial Road 271
- Quebec Route 271
- Saskatchewan Highway 271

== Japan ==
- Odawara-Atsugi Road (Route 271)

== United States ==
- Interstate 271
- U.S. Route 271
- Alabama State Route 271
- California State Route 271
- Florida State Road 271 (former)
- Georgia State Route 271
- Hawaii Route 271 (former)
- K-271 (Kansas highway) (former)
- Kentucky Route 271
- Minnesota State Highway 271
- Montana Secondary Highway 271
- New Mexico State Road 271
- New York State Route 271
- Oklahoma State Highway 271A
- Pennsylvania Route 271
- South Dakota Highway 271
- Tennessee State Route 271
- Texas State Highway 271 (former)
  - Texas State Highway Loop 271
  - Farm to Market Road 271 (Texas)
- Utah State Route 271
- Virginia State Route 271
- Washington State Route 271
- Wyoming Highway 271

| Preceded by 270 | Lists of highways 271 | Succeeded by 272 |
