= List of highways numbered 272 =

The following highways are numbered 272:

== Canada ==
- Manitoba Provincial Road 272
- Prince Edward Island Route 272

== Japan ==
- Japan National Route 272

== United States ==
- Connecticut Route 272
- Georgia State Route 272
- Kentucky Route 272
- Maryland Route 272
- Minnesota State Highway 272 (former)
- Montana Secondary Highway 272
- New Mexico State Road 272
- New York State Route 272
- Pennsylvania Route 272
- Tennessee State Route 272
- Texas State Highway 272 (former)
  - Texas State Highway Spur 272
  - Farm to Market Road 272 (Texas)
- Utah State Route 272 (former)
- Virginia State Route 272
- Washington State Route 272
- Wyoming Highway 272

Preceded by 271	Lists of highways 272	Succeeded by 273
