= List of highways numbered 270 =

Route 270 or Highway 270 may refer to:

== Canada ==
- Manitoba Provincial Road 270
- Prince Edward Island Route 270

== Japan ==
- Japan National Route 270

== United Kingdom ==
- B270 road

== United States ==
- Interstate 270 (multiple highways)
- U.S. Route 270
- California State Route 270
- Florida State Road 270 (former)
- Georgia State Route 270
- Hawaii Route 270
- Kentucky Route 270
- Maryland Route 270
- Minnesota State Highway 270
- New York State Route 270
- Oklahoma State Highway 270
- Pennsylvania Route 270 (former)
- Tennessee State Route 270
- Texas State Highway 270 (former)
- Utah State Route 270
- Virginia State Route 270
- Washington State Route 270
- West Virginia Route 270
- Wyoming Highway 270

Preceded by 269	Lists of highways 270	Succeeded by 271
