= List of highways numbered 274 =

The following highways are numbered 274:

== Canada ==
- Manitoba Provincial Road 274

== Japan ==
- Japan National Route 274

== United States ==
- Interstate 274 (future)
- California State Route 274 (former)
- Florida State Road 274 (former)
- Georgia State Route 274
- K-274 (Kansas highway)
- Kentucky Route 274
- Maryland Route 274
- Minnesota State Highway 274
- Montana Secondary Highway 274
- New York State Route 274
- North Carolina Highway 274
- Ohio State Route 274
- Pennsylvania Route 274
- South Carolina Highway 274
- Tennessee State Route 274
- Texas State Highway 274
  - Texas State Highway Loop 274
  - Farm to Market Road 274 (Texas)
- Utah State Route 274
- Virginia State Route 274
- Washington State Route 274

Preceded by 273	Lists of highways 274	Succeeded by 275
