= List of highways numbered 269 =

The following highways are numbered 269:

== Canada ==
- Manitoba Provincial Road 269
- Quebec Route 269

== Japan ==
- Japan National Route 269

== United Kingdom ==
- B269 road
- A269 road

== United States ==
- Interstate 269
- Alabama State Route 269
- Arkansas Highway 269
- California State Route 269
- Florida State Road 269 (former)
- Georgia State Route 269 (former)
- Indiana State Road 269
- K-269 (Kansas highway) (former)
- Kentucky Route 269
- Maryland Route 269 (former)
- Minnesota State Highway 269
- Missouri Route 269
- Montana Secondary Highway 269
- New York State Route 269
- Ohio State Route 269
- South Carolina Highway 269
- Tennessee State Route 269
- Texas State Highway 269 (former)
  - Texas State Highway Spur 269 (former)
  - Farm to Market Road 269 (Texas)
- Utah State Route 269
- Virginia State Route 269

| Preceded by 268 | Lists of highways 269 | Succeeded by 270 |
