= List of highways numbered 273 =

The following highways are numbered 273:

== Canada ==
- Manitoba Provincial Road 273
- Quebec Route 273

== Japan ==
- Japan National Route 273

== United States ==
- Alabama State Route 273
- Arizona State Route 273
- California State Route 273
- Delaware Route 273
- Florida State Road 273
- Georgia State Route 273
- Iowa Highway 273 (former)
- K-273 (Kansas highway)
- Kentucky Route 273
- Maryland Route 273
- Minnesota State Highway 273
- Missouri Route 273
- Montana Secondary Highway 273
- New Mexico State Road 273
- New York State Route 273 (former)
- Ohio State Route 273
- Oregon Route 273
- South Dakota Highway 273
- Tennessee State Route 273
- Texas State Highway 273
  - Texas State Highway Spur 273
  - Farm to Market Road 273 (Texas)
- Utah State Route 273
- Virginia State Route 273
- Wyoming Highway 273

| Preceded by 272 | Lists of highways 273 | Succeeded by 274 |
