= Maritime Central Airways Flight 315 =

1957 aviation accident

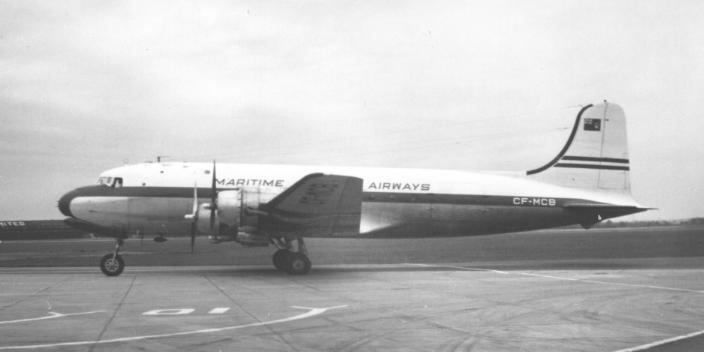
- An MCA Douglas DC-4, similar to the crashed aircraft

Accident
- Date: 11 August 1957
- Summary: Loss of control in severe weather conditions
- Site: Near Notre-Dame-du-Sacré-Cœur-d'Issoudun, Quebec, Quebec, Canada; 46°34′41″N 71°37′31″W

Aircraft
- Aircraft type: Douglas DC-4
- Operator: Maritime Central Airways
- Registration: CF-MCF
- Flight origin: Heathrow Airport, London
- Stopover: Keflavík International Airport, Reykjavík
- Last stopover: Goose Bay Airport, Goose Bay, Newfoundland
- Destination: Malton Airport, Toronto, Ontario
- Passengers: 73
- Crew: 6
- Fatalities: 79
- Survivors: 0

Maritime Central Airways Flight 315 was an international charter flight from London, England to Toronto, Canada, with refueling stops in Reykjavík, Iceland, and Goose Bay, Labrador. On 11 August 1957, the aircraft operating this flight, a Douglas DC-4, crashed in bad weather 7.2 kilometres (4.5 mi) west of Notre-Dame-du-Sacré-Coeur-d'Issoudun, Quebec, killing all 79 people on board. At the time, it was the deadliest aviation accident in Canadian history, and as of 2025 is still the fifth-deadliest. It is also the second-deadliest crash involving a DC-4, behind another in 1967.

== Accident ==
Flight 315 departed London Heathrow Airport for Reykjavík at 21:48 GMT. Then, after stopping in Reykjavík for 66 minutes to refuel, it proceeded on the next leg of its route to Canada. After entering Canadian airspace, the flight crew radioed that they wished to bypass Goose Bay and proceed to Montreal instead. At 18:10, Quebec Radio Range Station relayed a message to the aircraft, requesting it to contact Montreal Range while approaching Rougemont for clearance. This was the final communication with the aircraft prior to the accident.

While flying in the vicinity of Quebec City at an altitude of approx. 6,000 feet, Flight 315 flew into a cumulonimbus cloud. Encountering severe turbulence, the aircraft somehow lost control and went into a near-vertical dive from which it could not recover. At 18:15 UTC, at a speed of over 200 knots, the aircraft slammed into the ground near Notre-Dame-du-Sacré-Coeur-d'Issoudun in a 70-degree nose-down position and a slight left bank angle. All 73 passengers and six crew were killed on impact.
