= List of highways numbered 268 =

The following highways are numbered 268:

== Canada ==
- Manitoba Provincial Road 268
- Prince Edward Island Route 268

== Japan ==
- Japan National Route 268

== United Kingdom ==
- A268 road
- B268 road

== United States ==
- California State Route 268 (former)
- Florida State Road 268 (former)
- Georgia State Route 268
- K-268 (Kansas highway)
- Kentucky Route 268
- Maryland Route 268
- Minnesota State Highway 268 (former)
- New Mexico State Road 268
- New York State Route 268
- North Carolina Highway 268
- Pennsylvania Route 268
- South Carolina Highway 268
- Tennessee State Route 268
- Texas State Highway 268 (former)
  - Texas State Highway Loop 268
  - Texas State Highway Spur 268 (former)
  - Farm to Market Road 268 (Texas)
- Utah State Route 268

Preceded by 267	Lists of highways 268	Succeeded by 269
