= Laurier-Station =

- Village municipality
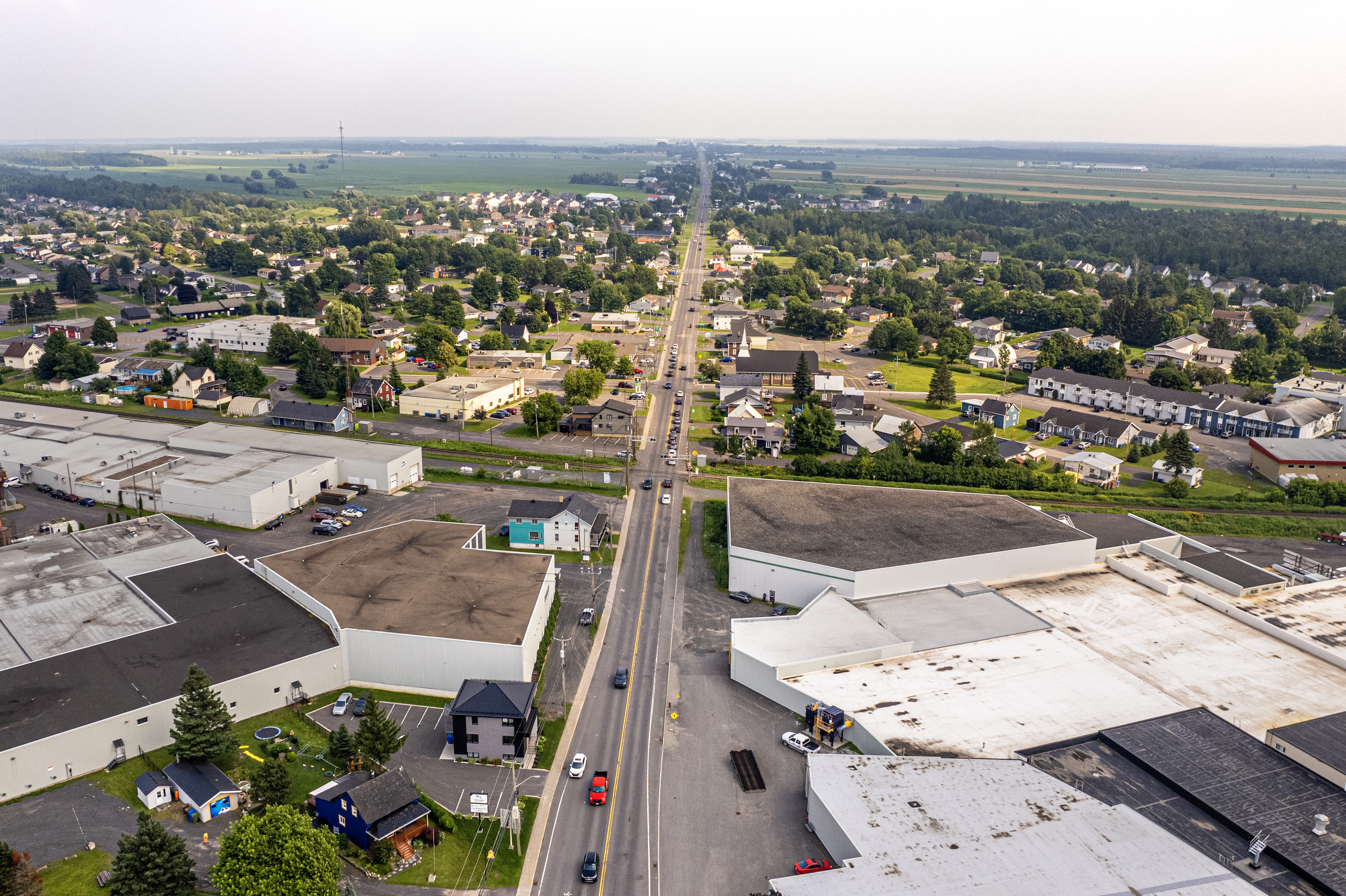
- Aerial view of Laurier-Station

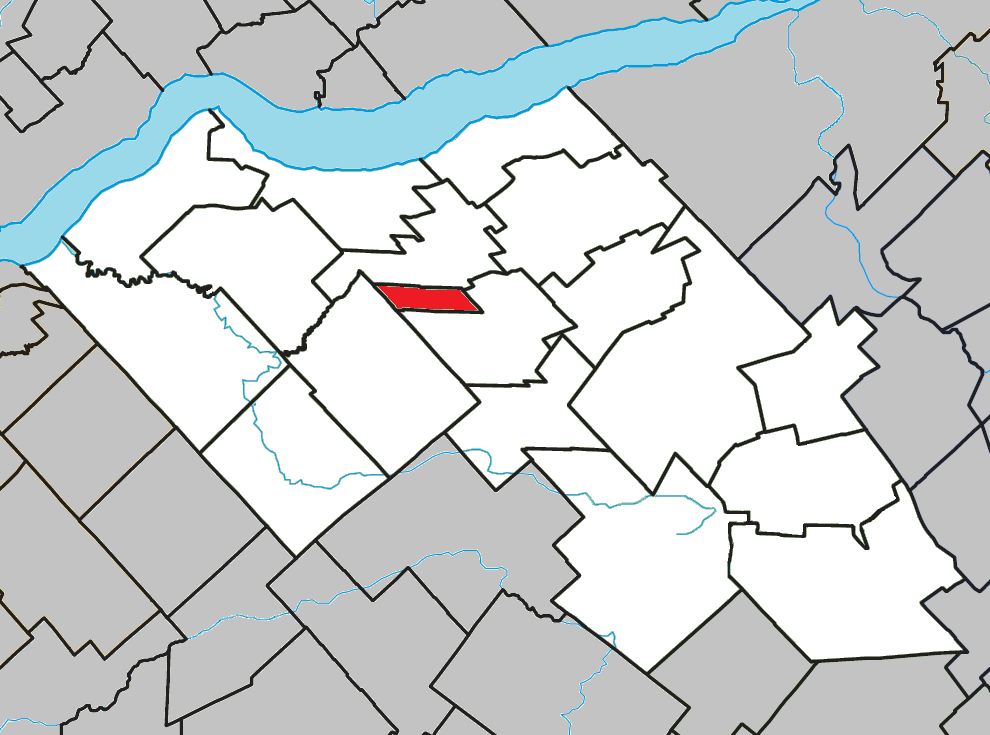
- Location within Lotbinière RCM.

- Location in southern Quebec.
- Coordinates: 46°32′N 71°38′W
- Country: Canada
- Province: Quebec
- Region: Chaudière-Appalaches
- RCM: Lotbinière
- Constituted: January 1, 1951
- Named for: Sir Wilfrid Laurier

Government
  - Mayor: Huguette Charest
  - Federal riding: Mégantic—L'Érable—Lotbinière
  - Prov. riding: Lotbinière-Frontenac

Area
  - Village municipality: 12.00 km^{2} (4.63 sq mi)
  - Land: 12.16 km^{2} (4.70 sq mi)
  - Urban: 2.97 km^{2} (1.15 sq mi)
- There is an apparent contradiction between two authoritative sources

Population (2021)
  - Village municipality: 2,570
  - Density: 211.3/km^{2} (547/sq mi)
  - Urban: 1,856
  - Urban density: 624.1/km^{2} (1,616/sq mi)
  - Pop 2016-2021: ▼0.1%
  - Dwellings: 1,164
- Time zone: UTC−05:00 (EST)
  - Summer (DST): UTC−04:00 (EDT)
- Postal code(s): G0S 1N0
- Area codes: 418 and 581
- Highways A-20 (TCH): R-271
- Census profile
- MAMROT info: 33060
- Toponymie info: 34717
- Website: www.ville. laurier-station.qc.ca

Laurier-Station (French pronunciation: [loʁje stasjɔ̃]) is a village municipality in Lotbinière Regional County Municipality in the Chaudière-Appalaches region of Quebec, Canada. Its population is 2,570 as of the Canada 2021 Census.

It is named after its train station, Laurier, which is itself named in honour of Prime Minister Sir Wilfrid Laurier. It is also the town where the professional hockey player David Desharnais was born.

== History ==
Laurier-Station was originally part of Saint-Flavien but split away in 1951 to become a municipality of its own. The railway station, built in 1880, launched the development of the region. In the 1950s, the advent of the Trans-Canada Highway and furniture manufacturing industries propelled the town's development.

== Geography ==
Laurier-Station is situated 43 kilometres south-west of Quebec City. With a land area of 12.16 km², Laurier-Station is the smallest municipality in the Lotbinière RCM. Its territory is shaped like a parallelogram, approximately 1.7 km wide and 7 km long. Bordered by farmland, the Route de la Pointe-du-Jour forms its eastern boundary. Autoroute 20 runs through the municipality, with the town centred on either side of it. Boulevard Saint-Joseph (Route 271) is the main local thoroughfare. The village centre comprises a commercial and industrial area, running alongside the motorway, as well as a residential area. Farmland surrounds the village. The Huron River rises here and flows through part of Laurier-Station as it heads north. The municipality also has a few small agricultural streams. The terrain is flat, with elevations ranging from 100 to 130 metres.

== Demographics ==
In the 2021 Census of Population conducted by Statistics Canada, Laurier-Station had a population of 2,570 living in 1,126 of its 1,164 total private dwellings, a change of −0.1% from its 2016 population of 2,573. With a land area of 12.16 km^{2} (4.70 sq mi), it had a population density of 211.3/km^{2} (547.4/sq mi) in 2021.

== Notable people ==
- Laurent Beaudoin – businessman
- David Desharnais - ice hockey player
