= Interstate 275 =

Interstate 275 (I-275) may refer to:

- Interstate 275 (Ohio–Indiana–Kentucky), a full beltway around Cincinnati, OH; Covington, KY; Lawrenceburg, IN - construction started in 1968
- Interstate 275 (Florida), a loop through Tampa, St. Petersburg, and Bradenton in Florida
- Interstate 275 (Michigan), a western bypass of Detroit, Michigan
- Interstate 275 (Tennessee), a connection to downtown Knoxville, Tennessee, from the north
