= Saint-Flavien =

Municipality in Quebec, Canada

- Municipality
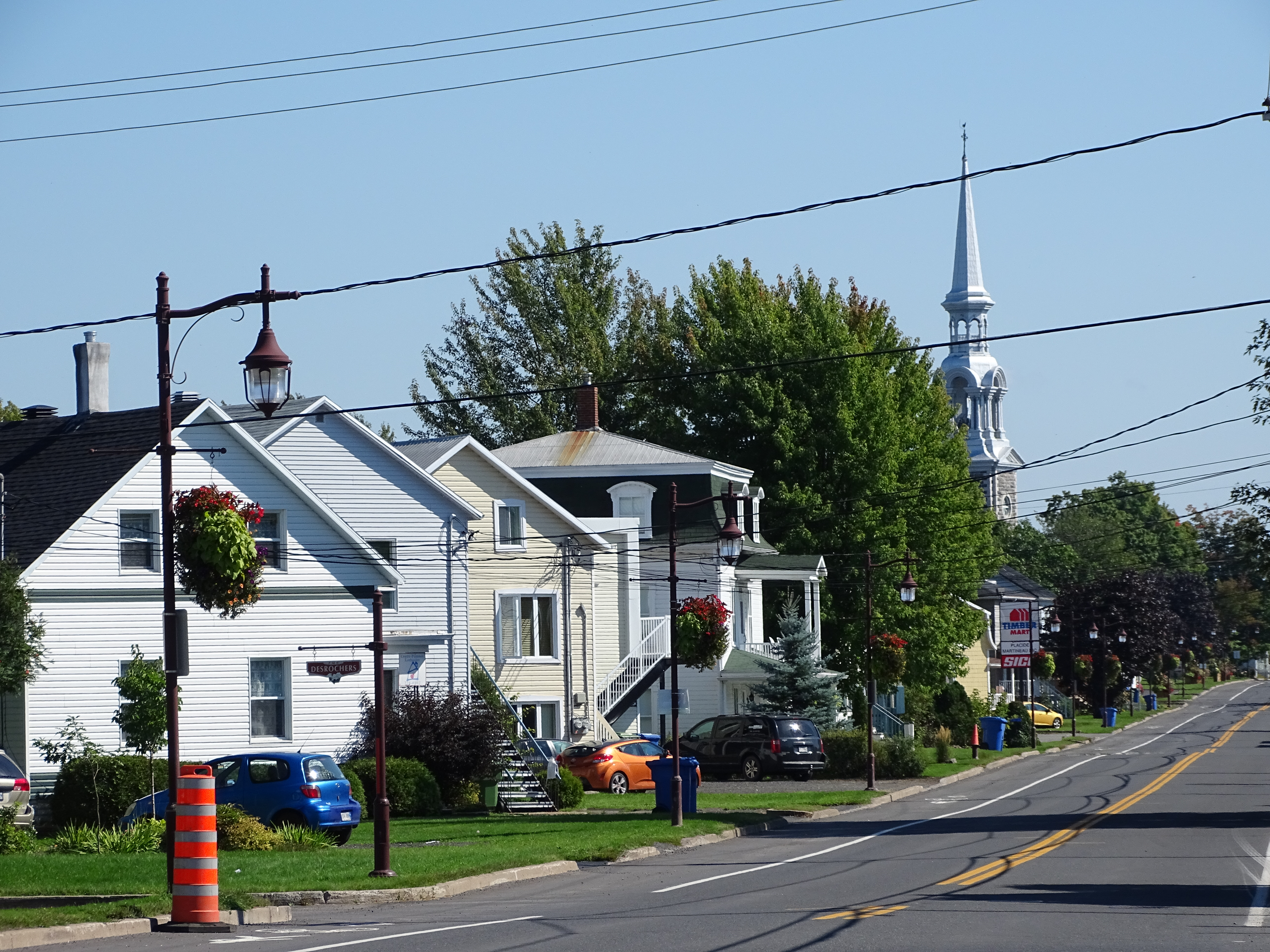
- Motto: Générosité et Solidarité (French) "Generosity and Solidarity"
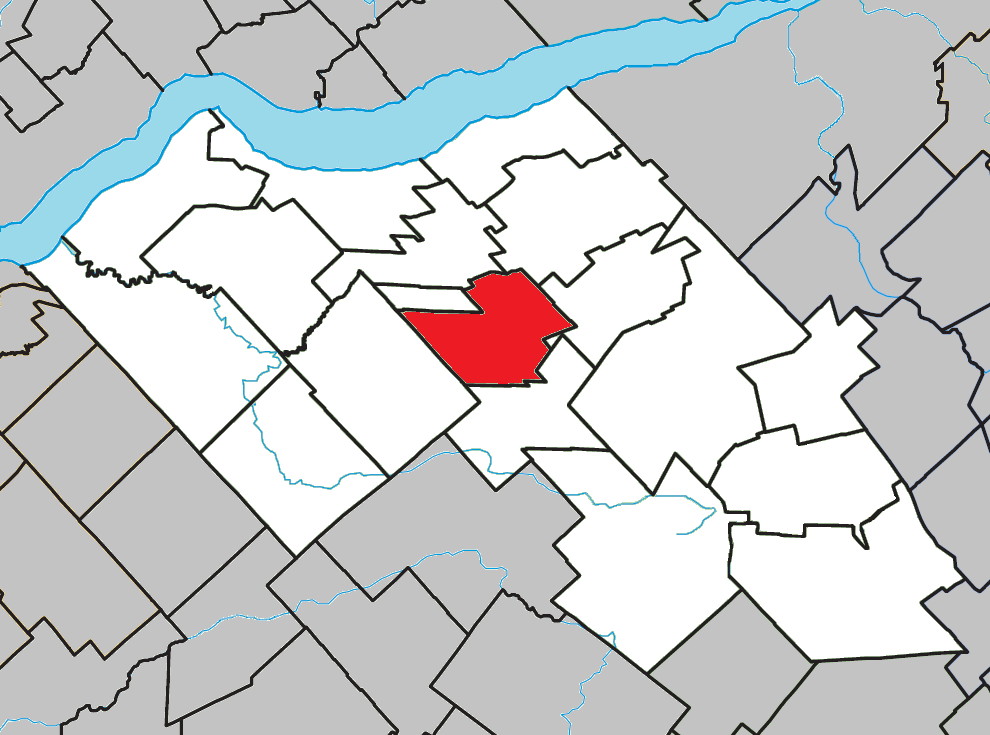
- Location within Lotbinière RCM

- Location in southern Quebec
- Coordinates: 46°31′N 71°36′W
- Country: Canada
- Province: Quebec
- Region: Chaudière-Appalaches
- RCM: Lotbinière
- Constituted: December 29, 1999

Government
  - Mayor: Normand Côté
  - Federal riding: Mégantic—L'Érable—Lotbinière
  - Prov. riding: Lotbinière-Frontenac

Area
  - Total: 65.80 km^{2} (25.41 sq mi)
  - Land: 66.16 km^{2} (25.54 sq mi)
- There is an apparent contradiction between two authoritative sources

Population (2021)
  - Total: 1,619
  - Density: 24.5/km^{2} (63/sq mi)
  - Pop 2016-2021: ▲0.1%
  - Dwellings: 735
- Time zone: UTC−5 (EST)
  - Summer (DST): UTC−4 (EDT)
- Postal code(s): G0S 2M0
- Area codes: 418 and 581
- Highways A-20: R-271
- Website: www.st-flavien.com

Saint-Flavien (French pronunciation: [sɛ̃ flavjɛ̃]) is a municipality in the Lotbinière Regional County Municipality in Quebec, Canada. It is part of the Chaudière-Appalaches region and had a population is 1,619 as of 2021. The municipality, constituted in 1999, covers an area of 66 km^{2}, with a population density of 25.

It is named after Archbishop Pierre-Flavien Turgeon and was created from the merger of the parish and the village of the same name.

== History ==
Although the new constitution dates from 1999as a result of the merger of the Parish and of the Village of Saint-Flavien, the area has been settled since 1800. The original territory of Saint-Flavien, part of the seigneurie of Sainte-Croix, was split several times for the creation of the communities of Notre-Dame-du-Sacré-Cœur-d'Issoudun (1903), Dosquet (1912), the Village of Saint-Flavien (1912), Saint-Janvier-de-Joly (1928), and Laurier-Station (1951).

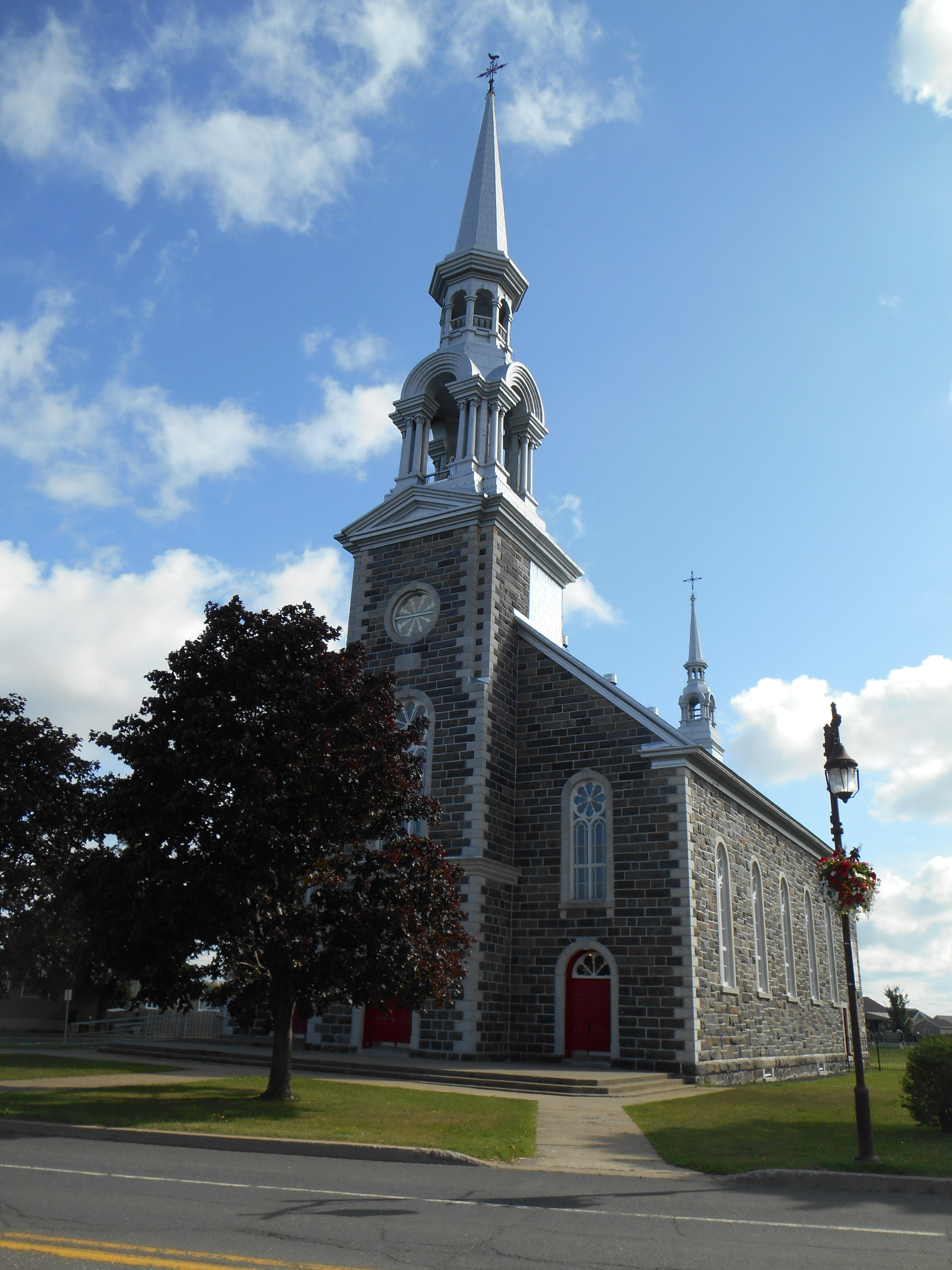
Saint-Flavien Church

== Geography ==
Saint-Flavien is situated some thirty kilometres south-west of Quebec City. With a land area of 66.16 km², Saint-Flavien is geographically situated at the heart of the Lotbinière Regional County Municipality, of which it makes up approximately 4 per cent of the territory. Bordered by farmland, Route Saint-André forms its western boundary. The municipality is mainly crossed by Route 271, running north to south, and by Rang des Pointes, running east to west. The village centre is situated at the junction of these two roads. In addition, Autoroute 20 passes through the municipality, but only along a very short stretch in the north-west. The municipality has a few small agricultural streams. Its terrain is flat, with elevations ranging from 110 to 140 metres.

Before the 1990s, the subsoil beneath Saint-Flavien was characterised by the presence of natural gas. Since 1997, the depleted field has been used as a storage facility for seasonal gas storage, and is the largest underground storage facility in Quebec.
