= Notre-Dame-du-Sacré-Coeur-d'Issoudun =

Notre-Dame-du-Sacré-Cœur-d'Issoudun
- Parish municipality
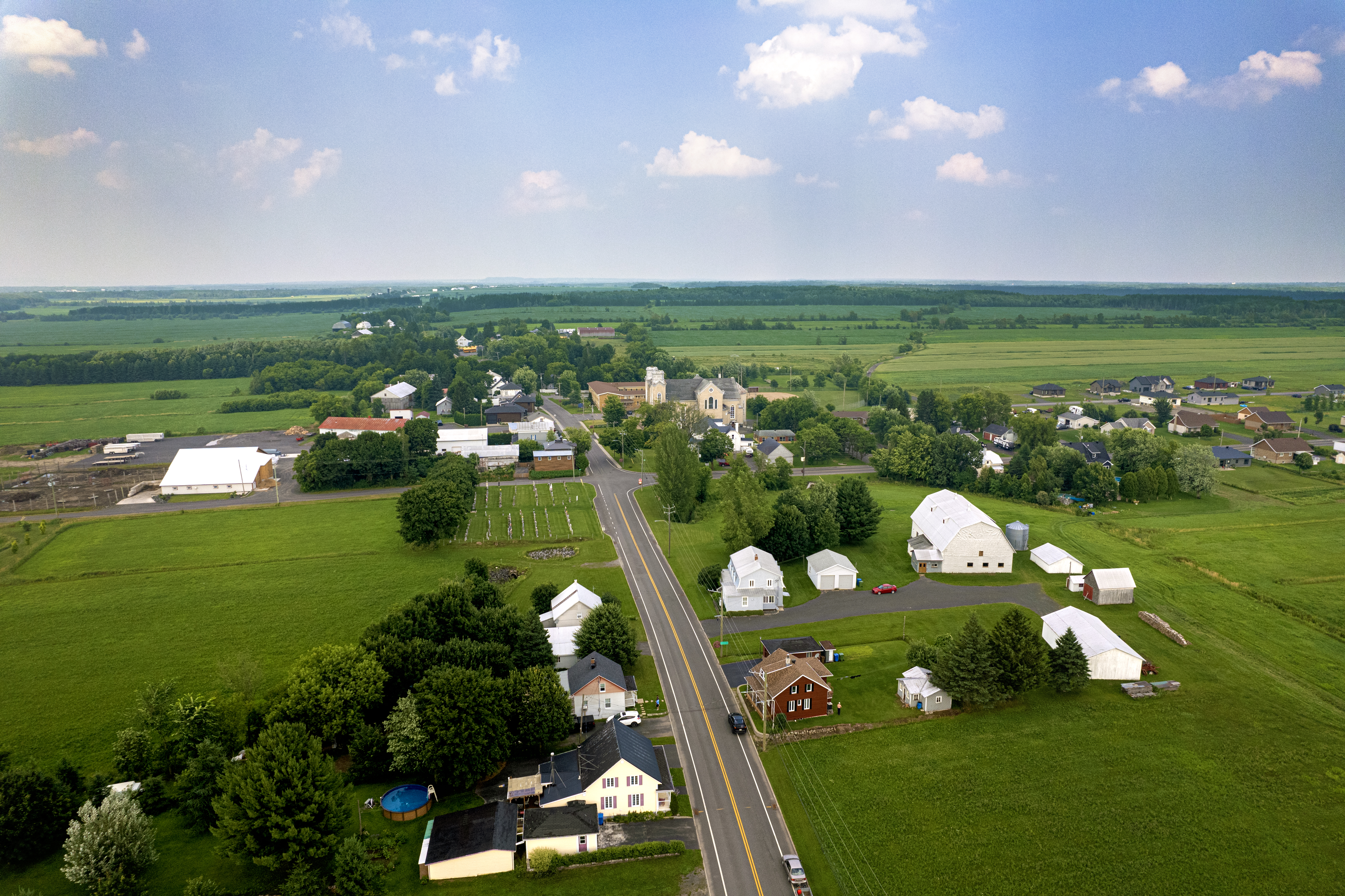
- Aerial view of Notre-Dame-du-Sacré-Cœur-d'Issoudun

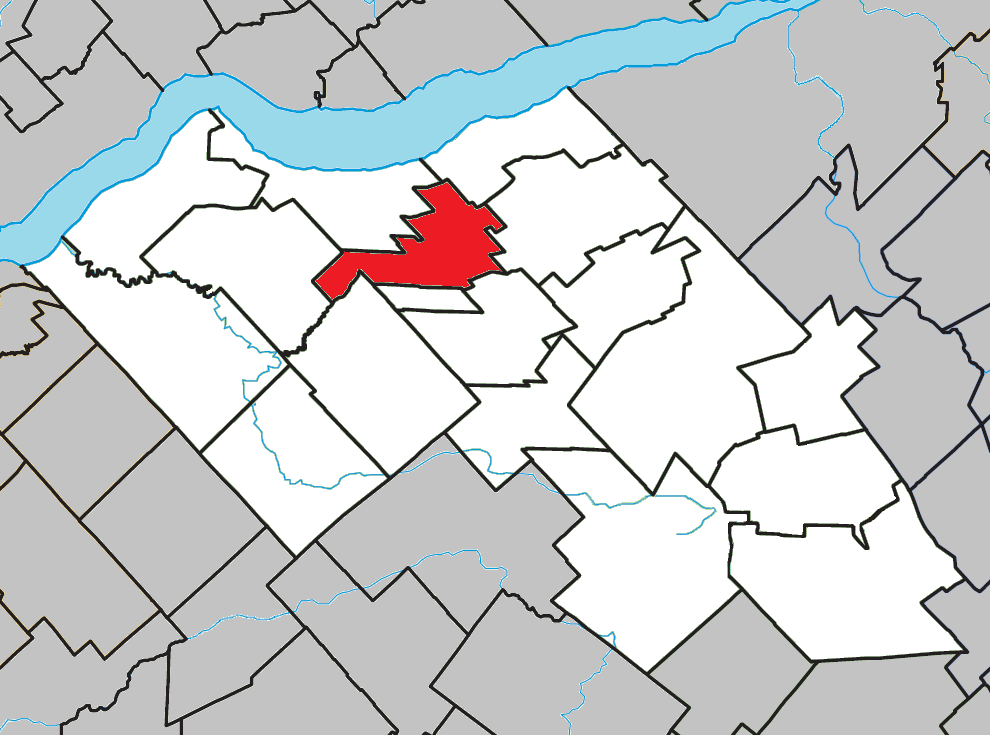
- Location within Lotbinière RCM

- Location in southern Quebec
- Coordinates: 46°35′N 71°37′W
- Country: Canada
- Province: Quebec
- Region: Chaudière-Appalaches
- RCM: Lotbinière
- Constituted: January 4, 1909
- Named for: Issoudun

Government
  - Mayor: Annie Thériault
  - Federal riding: Mégantic—L'Érable—Lotbinière
  - Prov. riding: Lotbinière-Frontenac

Area
  - Total: 60.60 km^{2} (23.40 sq mi)
  - Land: 60.32 km^{2} (23.29 sq mi)

Population (2021)
  - Total: 867
  - Density: 14.4/km^{2} (37/sq mi)
  - Pop 2016-2021: ▲0.7%
  - Dwellings: 370
- Time zone: UTC−5 (EST)
  - Summer (DST): UTC−4 (EDT)
- Postal code(s): G0S 1L0
- Area codes: 418 and 581
- Highways A-20: R-271
- Website: www.issoudun.qc.ca

Notre-Dame-du-Sacré-Cœur-d'Issoudun (French pronunciation: [nɔtʁə dam dy sakʁe kœʁ disudœ̃], lit. 'Our Lady of the Sacred Heart of Issoudun') is a parish municipality in Lotbinière Regional County Municipality in the Chaudière-Appalaches region of Quebec, Canada. Its population is 867 as of the 2021 Canadian census. It is known mostly as Issoudun, given the length of the official name.

The name honours the origin of a group of Missionaries of the Sacred Heart who came to Quebec City in 1900, from Issoudun, France.

== History ==
The first application for the canonical establishment of the municipality was made in 1863 by residents of Saint-Antoine-de-Tilly, Saint-Apollinaire, Saint-Édouard-de-Lotbinière, Saint-Flavien and Sainte-Croix. The application was approved in 1903, following an increase in the number of residents. The official creation of the municipality took place in 1909.

On August 11, 1957, Maritime Central Airways Flight 315 crashed near Notre-Dame-du-Sacré-Coeur-d'Issoudun, killing 79 people.

== Demographics ==
In the 2021 census conducted by Statistics Canada, Notre-Dame-du-Sacré-Coeur-d'Issoudun had a population of 867 living in 351 of its 370 total private dwellings, a change of 0.7% from its 2016 population of 861. With a land area of 60.32 km^{2} (23.29 sq mi), it had a population density of 14.4/km^{2} (37.2/sq mi) in 2021.
