= Leclercville =

- Municipality
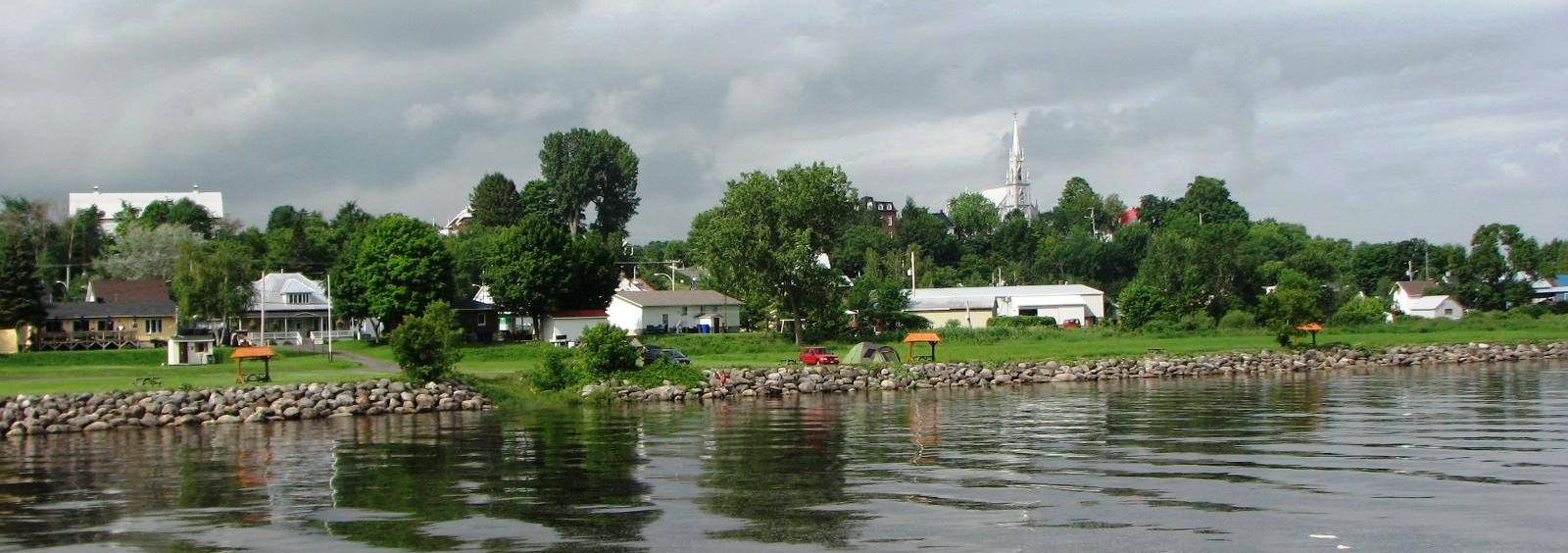
- Leclercville

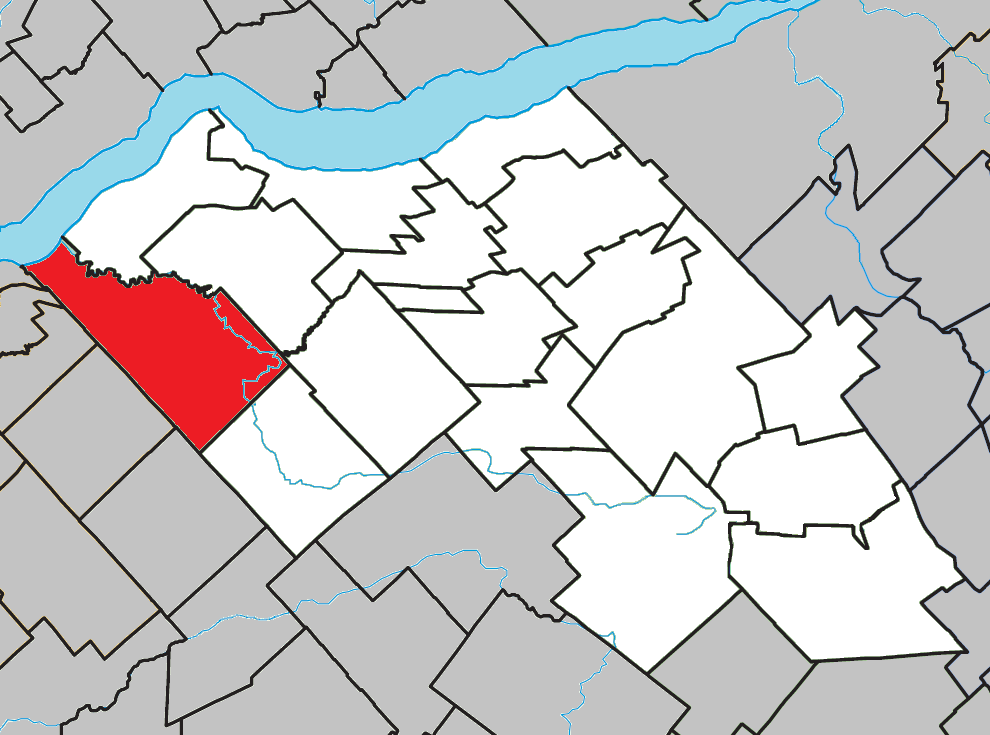
- Location within Lotbinière RCM

- Location in southern Quebec
- Coordinates: 46°34′N 72°00′W
- Country: Canada
- Province: Quebec
- Region: Chaudière-Appalaches
- RCM: Lotbinière
- Constituted: January 26, 2000

Government
  - Mayor: Benoît Lemay
  - Federal riding: Mégantic—L'Érable—Lotbinière
  - Prov. riding: Lotbinière-Frontenac

Area
  - Total: 135.50 km^{2} (52.32 sq mi)
  - Land: 136.61 km^{2} (52.75 sq mi)
- There is an apparent contradiction between two authoritative sources

Population (2021)
  - Total: 491
  - Density: 3.6/km^{2} (9.3/sq mi)
  - Pop 2016-2021: ▲3.8%
  - Dwellings: 270
- Time zone: UTC−05:00 (EST)
  - Summer (DST): UTC−04:00 (EDT)
- Postal code(s): G0S 2K0
- Area code: 819
- Highways: R-132; R-226
- Website: www.munleclercville.qc.ca

Leclercville (French pronunciation: [ləklɛʁvil]) is a municipality located on the south shore of the St. Lawrence River in the Lotbinière Regional County Municipality in Quebec, Canada. It is part of the Chaudière-Appalaches region and the population is 491 as of 2021.

== History ==
It is named after Pierre Leclerc, a settler who gave a large portion of his land for the construction of the church, the rector and their dependencies.

The municipality's recent constitution dates from 2000 and follows the amalgamation of the village of Leclercville with the parish of Sainte-Emmélie, but both communities had been settled since the beginning of the 18th century, and most considerably at the end of the 19th century.

== Demographics ==
Canada census – Leclercville community profile

	2021	2016	2011
Population	491 (+3.8% from 2016)	473 (-0.8% from 2011)	477 (-9% from 2006)
Land area	136.61 km^{2} (52.75 sq mi)	136.5 km^{2} (52.7 sq mi)	136.57 km^{2} (52.73 sq mi)
Population density	3.6/km^{2} (9.3/sq mi)	3.5/km^{2} (9.1/sq mi)	3.5/km^{2} (9.1/sq mi)
Median age	54 (M: 56, F: 52.4)	52.6 (M: 53, F: 52.1)	50 (M: 50.7, F: 49.3)
Private dwellings	270 (total)	262 (total)	268 (total)
Median household income	$60,000	$48,000	$42,856

References: 2021 2016 2011

Historical census populations – Leclercville, Quebec
Year	Pop.	±%
2001	587	—
2006	524	−10.7%
2011	477	−9.0%
2016	473	−0.8%
2021	491	+3.8%
Source: Statistics Canada
