= Dosquet =

- Municipality
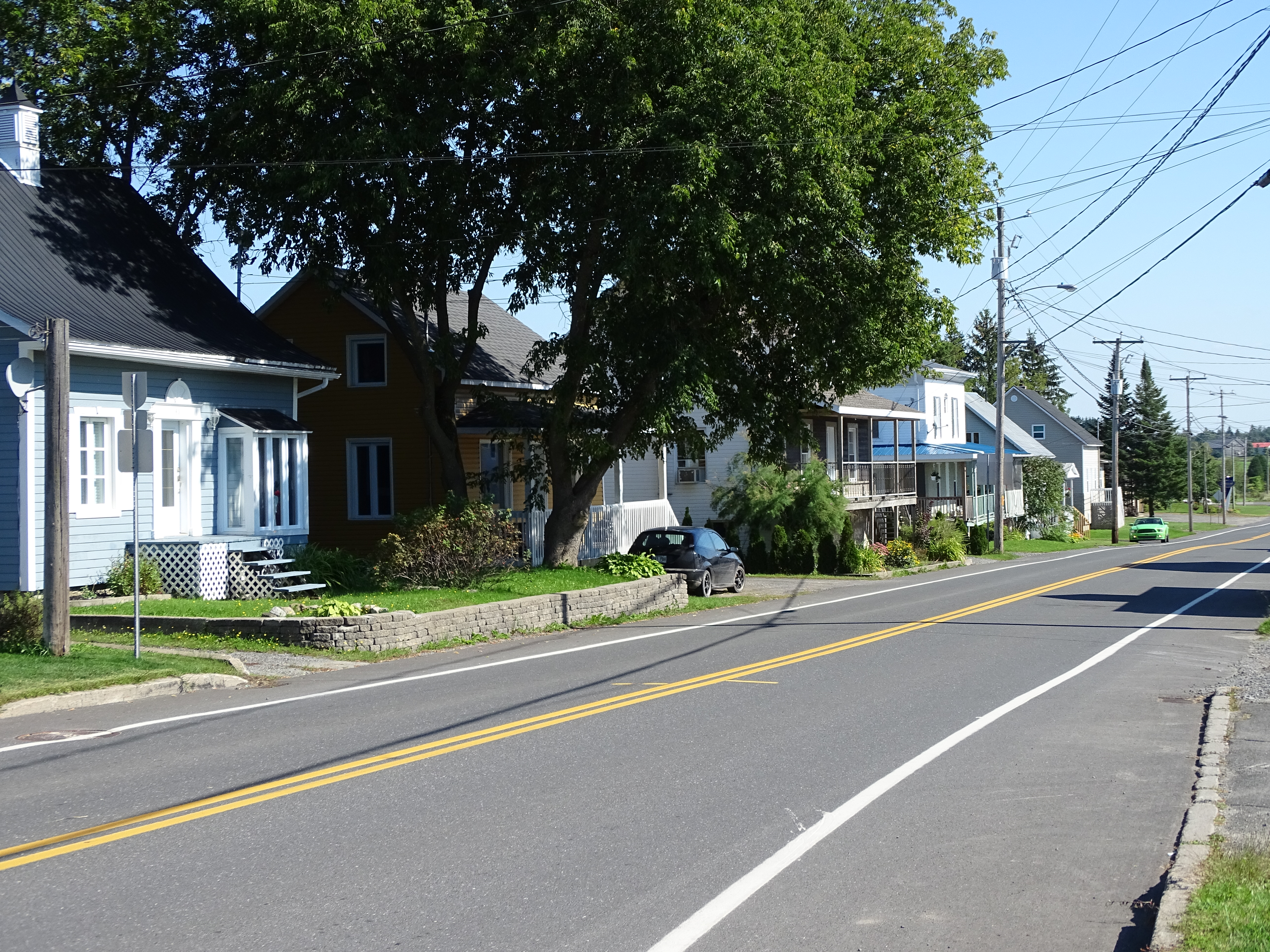
- Route Saint-Joseph

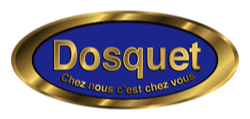
- Seal

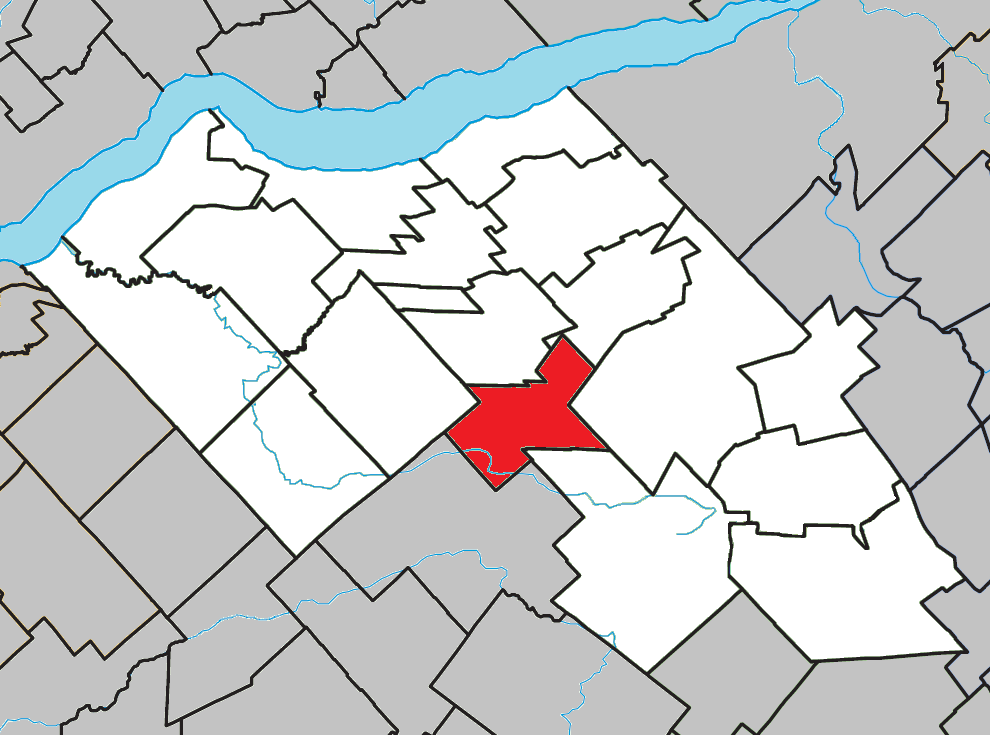
- Location within Lotbinière RCM

- Location in southern Quebec
- Coordinates: 46°28′N 71°32′W
- Country: Canada
- Province: Quebec
- Region: Chaudière-Appalaches
- RCM: Lotbinière
- Constituted: February 9, 1918

Government
  - Mayor: Yvan Charest
  - Federal riding: Mégantic—L'Érable—Lotbinière
  - Prov. riding: Lotbinière-Frontenac

Area
  - Total: 64.50 km^{2} (24.90 sq mi)
  - Land: 65.07 km^{2} (25.12 sq mi)
- There is an apparent contradiction between two authoritative sources

Population (2021)
  - Total: 935
  - Density: 14.4/km^{2} (37/sq mi)
  - Pop 2016-2021: ▼1%
  - Dwellings: 454
- Time zone: UTC−5 (EST)
  - Summer (DST): UTC−4 (EDT)
- Postal code(s): G0S 1H0
- Area codes: 418 and 581
- Highways: R-116; R-271
- Website: www.municipalitedosquet.com

Dosquet (French pronunciation: [dɔskɛ]) is a municipality in Lotbinière Regional County Municipality in the Chaudière-Appalaches region of Quebec, Canada. Its population was 935 as of the Canada 2021 Census.

Known officially until 1996 as Saint-Octave-de-Dosquet, the post office was named simply Dosquet in 1913, after Pierre-Herman Dosquet, fourth bishop of Quebec.

== History ==
Founded in 1918, the first inhabitants of the area were the family of Louis Méthot, who came from Sainte-Croix; that of Louis-Octave Ratté, who came from Saint-Flavien; and that of Louis-André Pillot, from Saint-Antoine-de-Tilly. Subsequently, other pioneers gradually settled in the area. On 16 May 1880, the widow of the Honourable Louis Méthot donated her land to her son Wenceslas. On 24 December 1912, the Lieutenant-Governor of the province of Quebec proclaimed the establishment of the Municipality of Saint-Octave-de-Dosquet by merging territories formerly from Sainte-Anastasie-de-Nelson, Saint-Agapit-de-Beaurivage and Saint-Flavien. However, due to a procedural irregularity in the election of municipal representatives, it was not until 9 February 1918 that the government's official gazette, confirmed the news. In 1996, the Saint-Octave-de-Dosquet shortened its name to simply Dosquet.

On 14 April 2000, Mathieu Perron died after losing control of his vehicle at 200 km/h and crashing into a ditch alongside Route 116. The SAAQ issued a public notice regarding this incident.

Dosquet celebrated his 100th birthday in 2012.
