= Val-Alain =

- Municipality
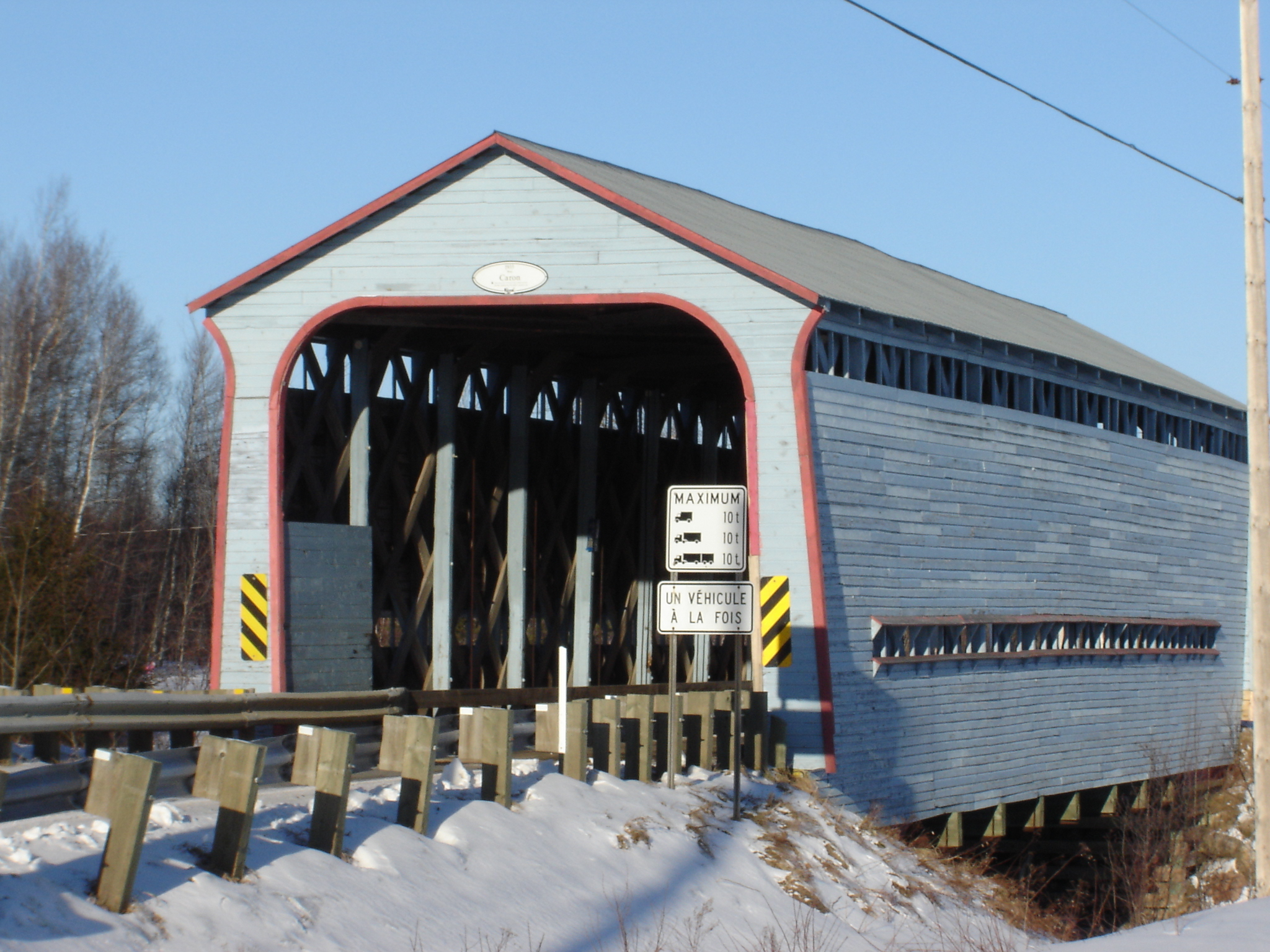
- Covered Bridge of Val-Alain

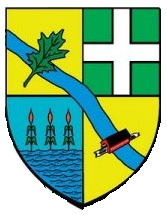
- Coat of arms

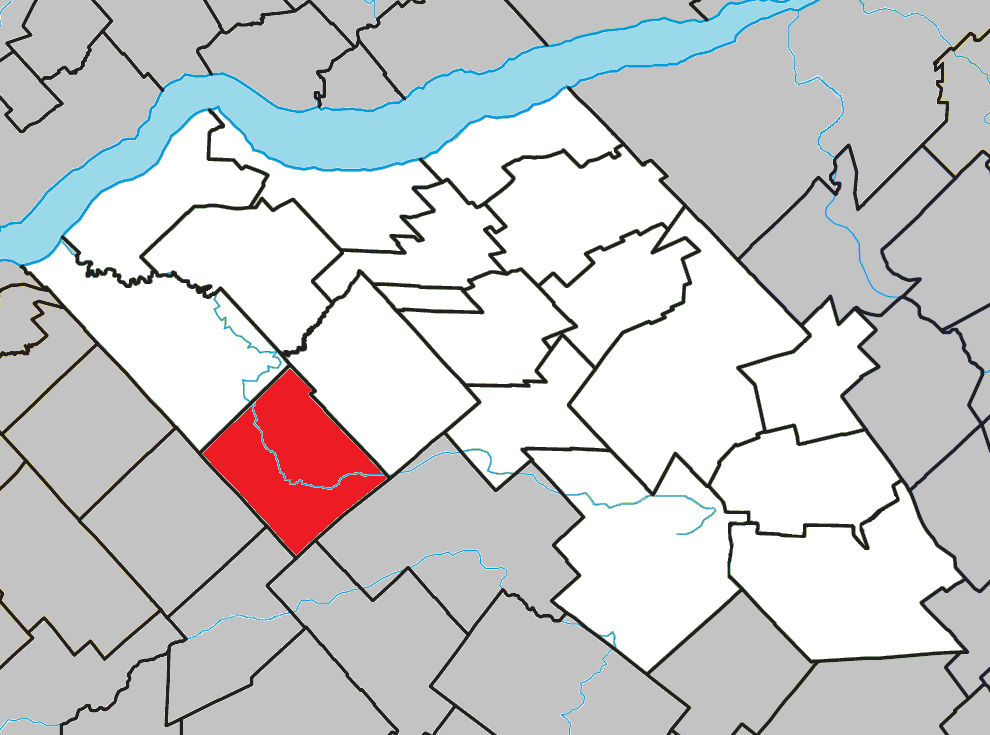
- Location within Lotbinière RCM.

- Location in southern Quebec.
- Coordinates: 46°25′N 71°45′W
- Country: Canada
- Province: Quebec
- Region: Chaudière-Appalaches
- RCM: Lotbinière
- Constituted: January 1, 1950

Government
  - Mayor: Daniel Turcotte
  - Federal riding: Mégantic—L'Érable—Lotbinière
  - Prov. riding: Lotbinière-Frontenac

Area
  - Total: 102.90 km^{2} (39.73 sq mi)
  - Land: 102.54 km^{2} (39.59 sq mi)

Population (2021)
  - Total: 986
  - Density: 9.6/km^{2} (25/sq mi)
  - Pop 2016-2021: ▲6.7%
  - Dwellings: 468
- Time zone: UTC−5 (EST)
  - Summer (DST): UTC−4 (EDT)
- Postal code(s): G0S 3H0
- Area codes: 418 and 581
- Highways: A-20 (TCH)
- Website: www.val-alain.com

Val-Alain (French pronunciation: [val alɛ̃]) is a municipality in Lotbinière Regional County Municipality in Quebec, Canada. It is part of the Chaudière-Appalaches region and the population is 986 as of 2021. It is named after Alain Chartier Joly de Lotbinière, the grandson of Henri-Gustave Joly de Lotbinière, a former premier of Quebec. "Monsieur Alain," as he was known, headed the Lotbinière seigneurie from 1911 to 1954.

== Demographics ==
=== Population ===
Population trend:

Census	Population	Change (%)
2021	986	▲6.7%
2016	924	▼3.2%
2011	955	▲6.0%
2006	901	▼5.4%
2001	952	▲6.4%
1996	895	▲0.7%
1991	889	▼4.8%
1986	934	▲0.9%
1981	926	▼4.0%
1976	965	▲1.3%
1971	953	▼7.8%
1966	1,034	▼9.5%
1961	1,142	▲3.3%
1956	1,105	▼0.9%
1951	1,115	N/A
