= Lotbinière Regional County Municipality =

Lotbinière
- Regional county municipality
- Coordinates: 46°31′N 71°36′W
- Country: Canada
- Province: Quebec
- Region: Chaudière-Appalaches
- Effective: January 1, 1982
- County seat: Sainte-Croix

Government
  - Type: Prefecture
  - Prefect: Daniel Turcotte

Area
  - Total: 1,687.00 km^{2} (651.35 sq mi)
  - Land: 1,662.27 km^{2} (641.81 sq mi)

Population (2016)
  - Total: 34 553
  - Density: 19.1/km^{2} (49/sq mi)
  - Change 2011-2016: ▲7.2%
  - Dwellings: 14,642
- Time zone: UTC−5 (EST)
  - Summer (DST): UTC−4 (EDT)
- Area codes: 418 and 581
- Website: www.mrclotbiniere.org

Lotbinière (French pronunciation: [lɔtbinjɛʁ]) is a regional county municipality in the Chaudière-Appalaches region of Quebec. It is an almost exclusively rural RCM, with no village with a population above 4,000. As of the 2016 Canadian census, the RCM had a population of 31,741. Its seat is in Sainte-Croix.

== Subdivisions ==
There are 18 subdivisions within the RCM:

Municipalities (14)

- Dosquet
- Leclercville
- Lotbinière
- Saint-Agapit
- Saint-Antoine-de-Tilly
- Saint-Apollinaire
- Sainte-Agathe-de-Lotbinière
- Sainte-Croix
- Saint-Flavien
- Saint-Gilles
- Saint-Janvier-de-Joly
- Saint-Patrice-de-Beaurivage
- Saint-Sylvestre
- Val-Alain

Parishes (3)

- Notre-Dame-du-Sacré-Cœur-d'Issoudun
- Saint-Édouard-de-Lotbinière
- Saint-Narcisse-de-Beaurivage

Villages (1)

- Laurier-Station

== Demographics ==
Historical Census Data - Lotbinière Regional County Municipality, Quebec
Year	Pop.	±%
2006	27,425	—
2011	29,617	+8.0%
2016	31,741	+7.2%

=== Language ===
Mother tongue from 2016 Canadian Census

Language	Population	Pct (%)
French only	30,845	98.2%
English only	230	0.7%
Both English and French	110	0.3%
Other languages	240	0.8%

== Transportation ==
=== Access Routes ===
Highways and numbered routes that run through the municipality, including external routes that start or finish at the county border:

- Autoroutes
  - A-20 (TCH)
- Principal Highways
  - R-116
  - R-132
- Secondary Highways
  - R-216
  - R-218
  - R-226
  - R-269
  - R-271
  - R-273
- External Routes
  - None

== See also ==
- List of regional county municipalities and equivalent territories in Quebec
