= Quebec Route 271 =

Highway in Quebec, Canada

Route 271

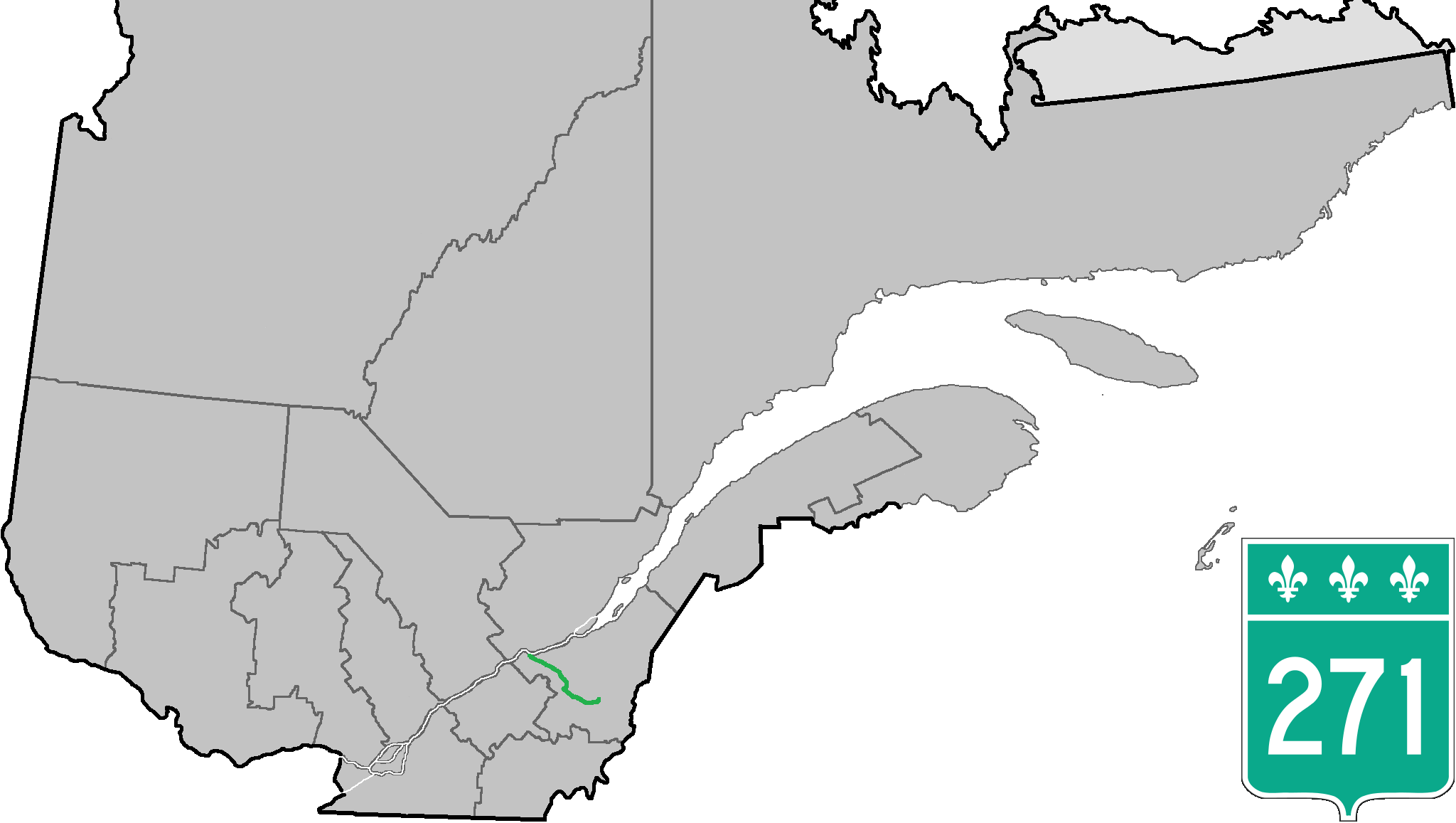

Route information
- Length: 123 km (76 mi)

Major junctions
- North end: R-132 in Sainte-Croix
- A-20 (TCH) in Laurier-Station; R-116 in Dosquet; R-112 in Sacré-Coeur-de-Jésus; R-108 in Saint-Éphrem-de-Beauce
- South end: R-173 in Saint-Georges

Location
- Country: Canada
- Province: Quebec
- Major cities: Saint-Georges, Laurier-Station

Highway system
- Quebec provincial highways; Autoroutes; List; Former
← R-269	→ R-273

Route 271 is a two-lane north/south highway on the south shore of the Saint Lawrence River in Quebec, Canada. Its northern terminus is in Sainte-Croix at the junction of Route 132, and the southern terminus is at the junction of Route 173 in Saint-Georges.

== Towns along Route 271 ==
- Sainte-Croix
- Notre-Dame-du-Sacré-Coeur-d'Issoudun
- Laurier-Station
- Saint-Flavien
- Dosquet
- Sainte-Agathe-de-Lotbinière
- Saint-Jacques-de-Leeds
- Saint-Pierre-de-Broughton
- Sacré-Coeur-de-Jésus
- Sainte-Clotide-de-Beauce
- Saint-Éphrem-de-Beauce
- Saint-Benoît-Labre
- Saint-Georges
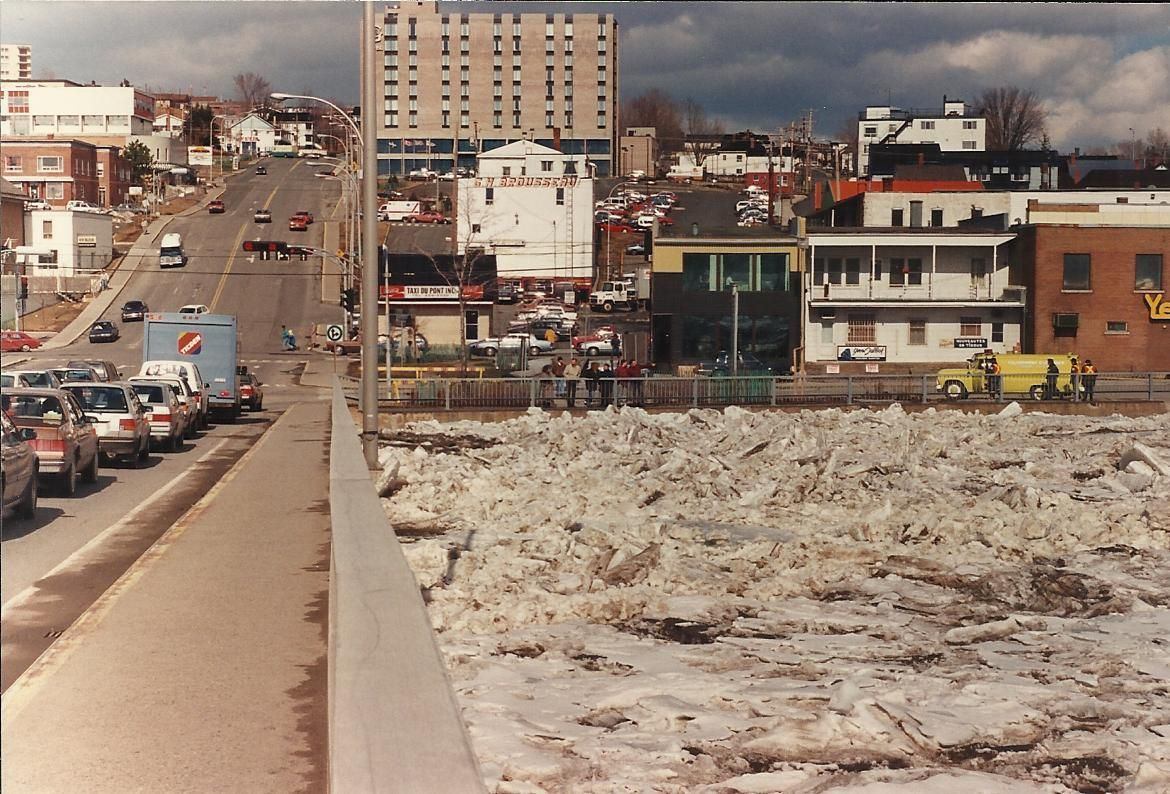
David-Roy bridge in Saint-Georges.

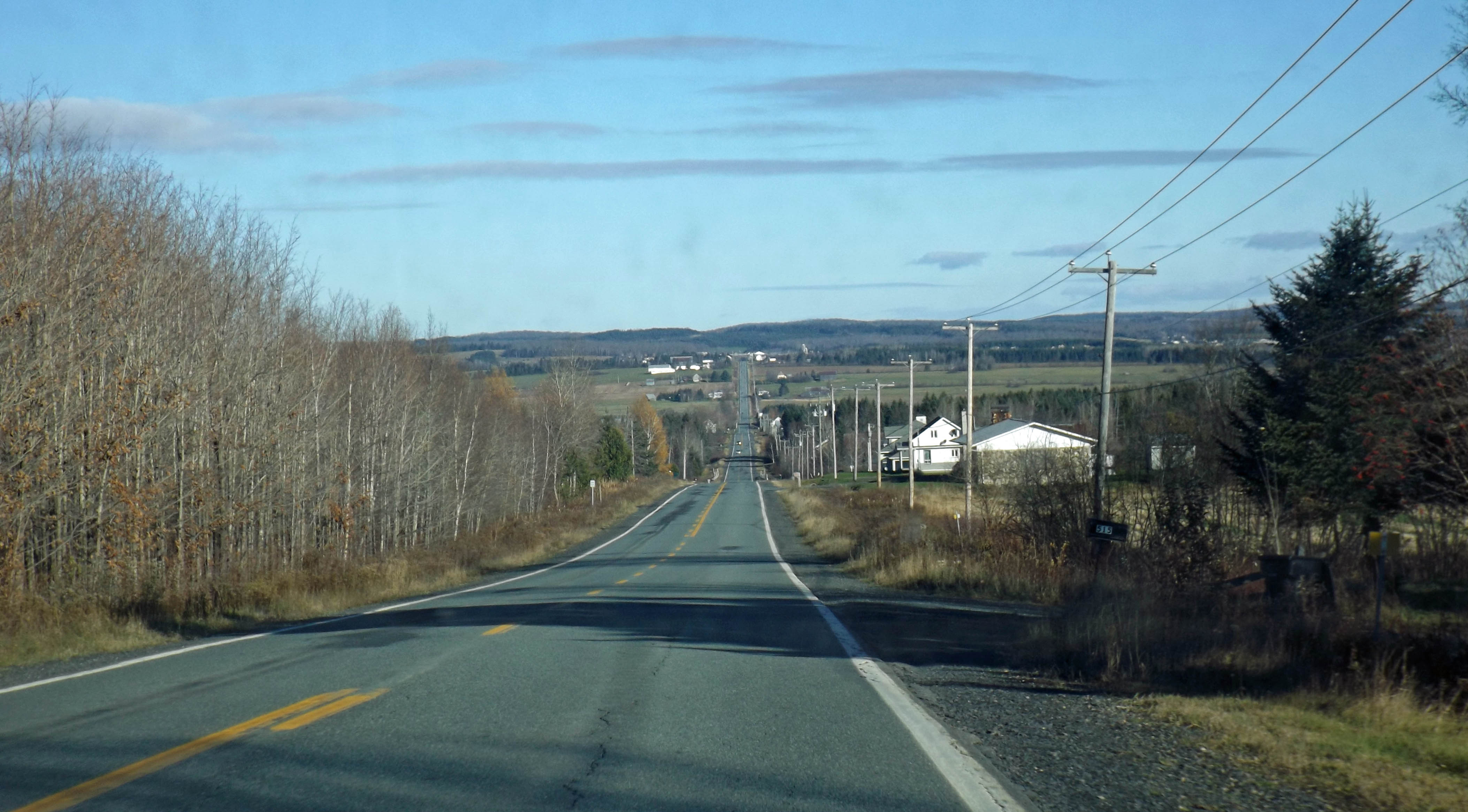
Route 271 in Saint-Benoît-Labre.

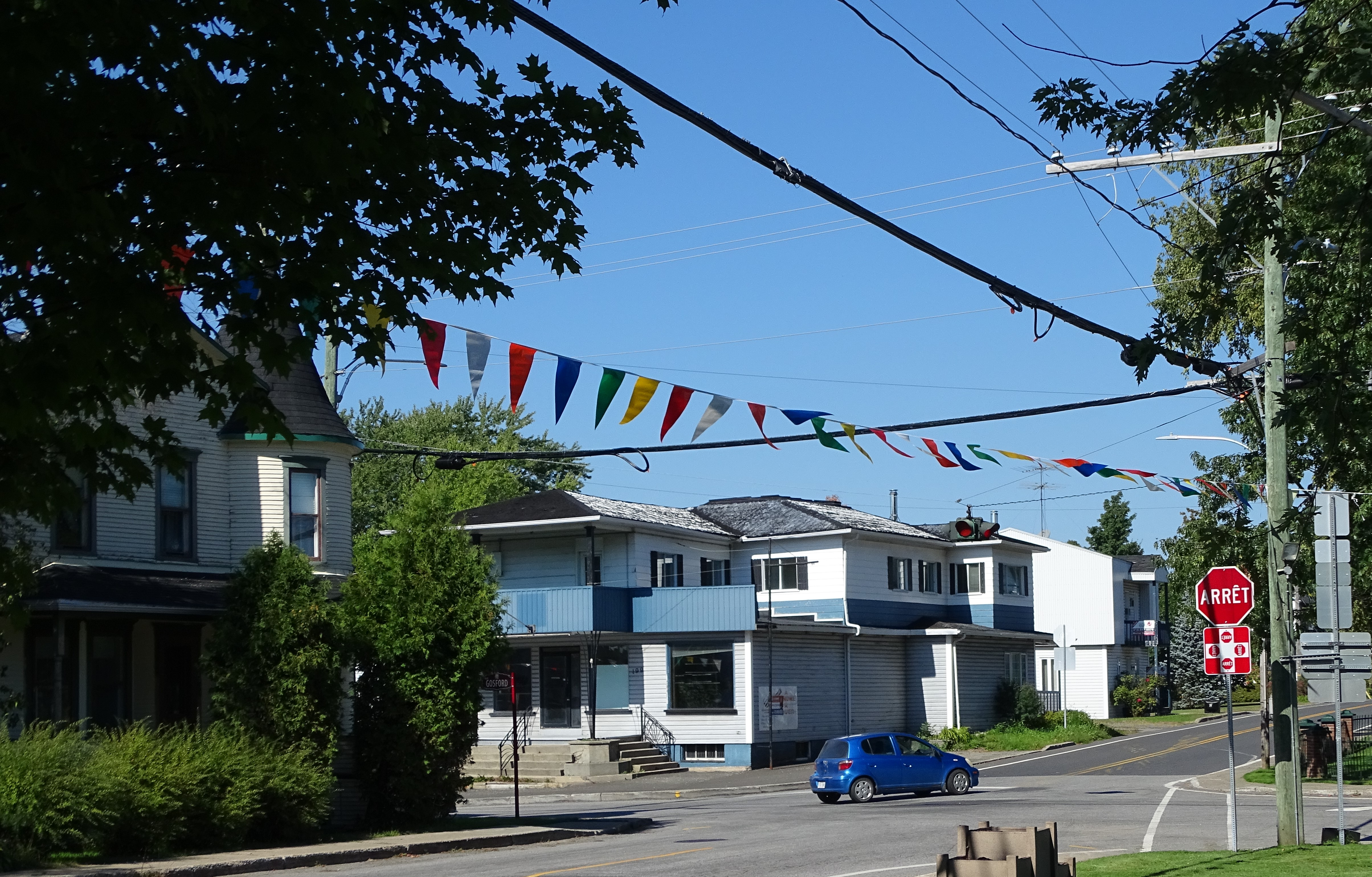
Intersection with Routes 218 in Sainte-Agathe-de-Lotbinière.

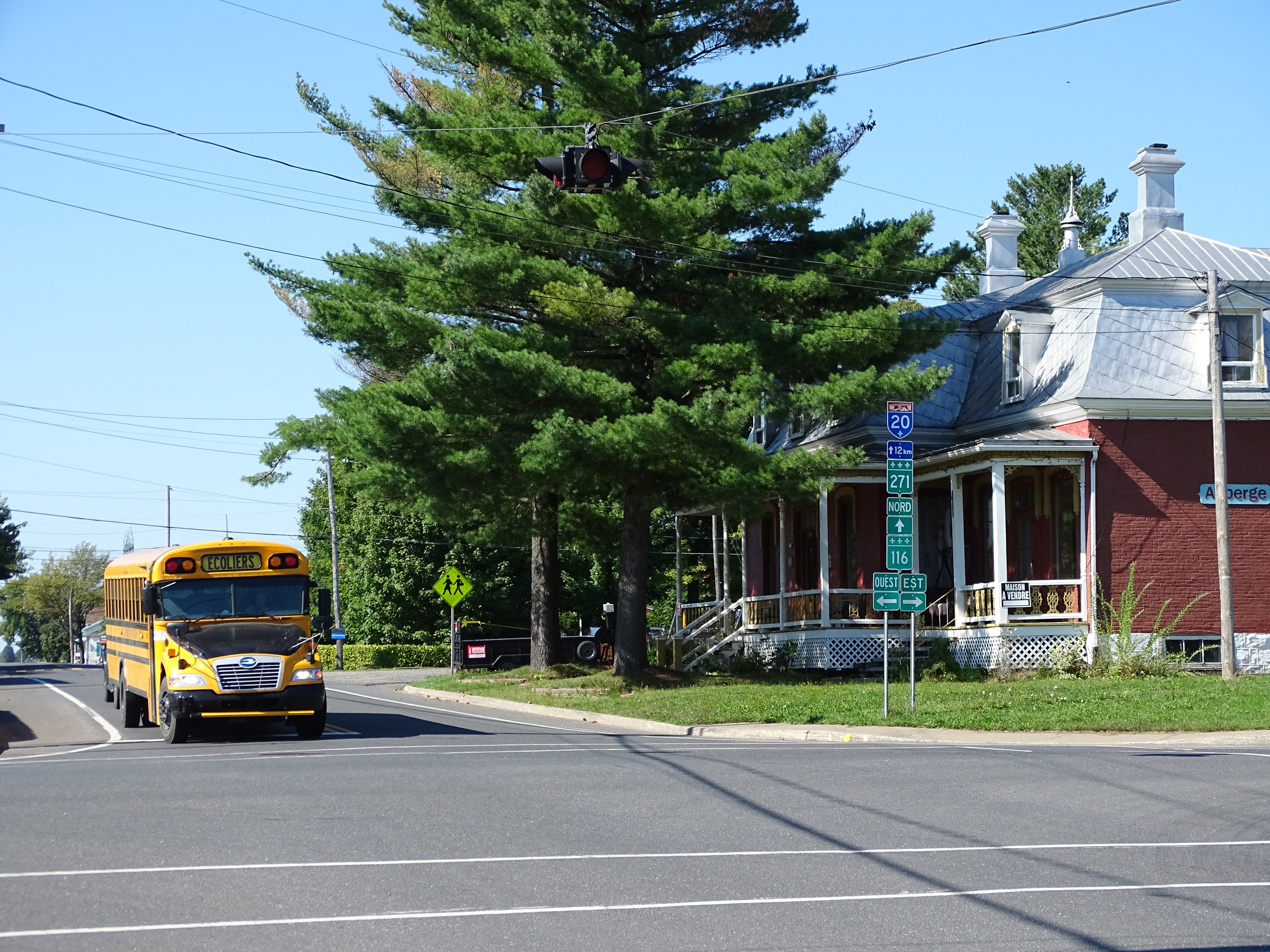
Intersection with Route 116 in Dosquet.

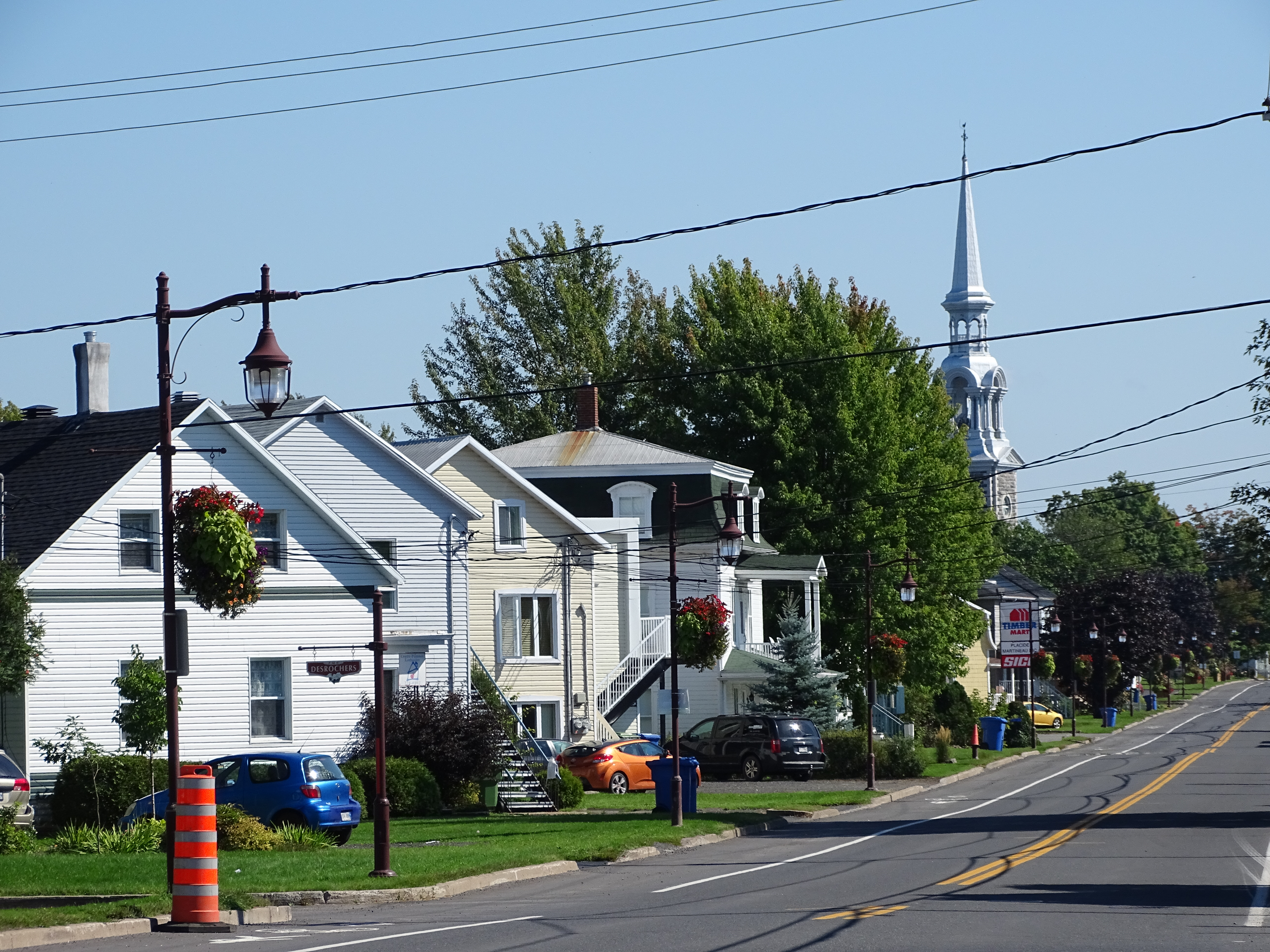
Principale street in Saint-Flavien.

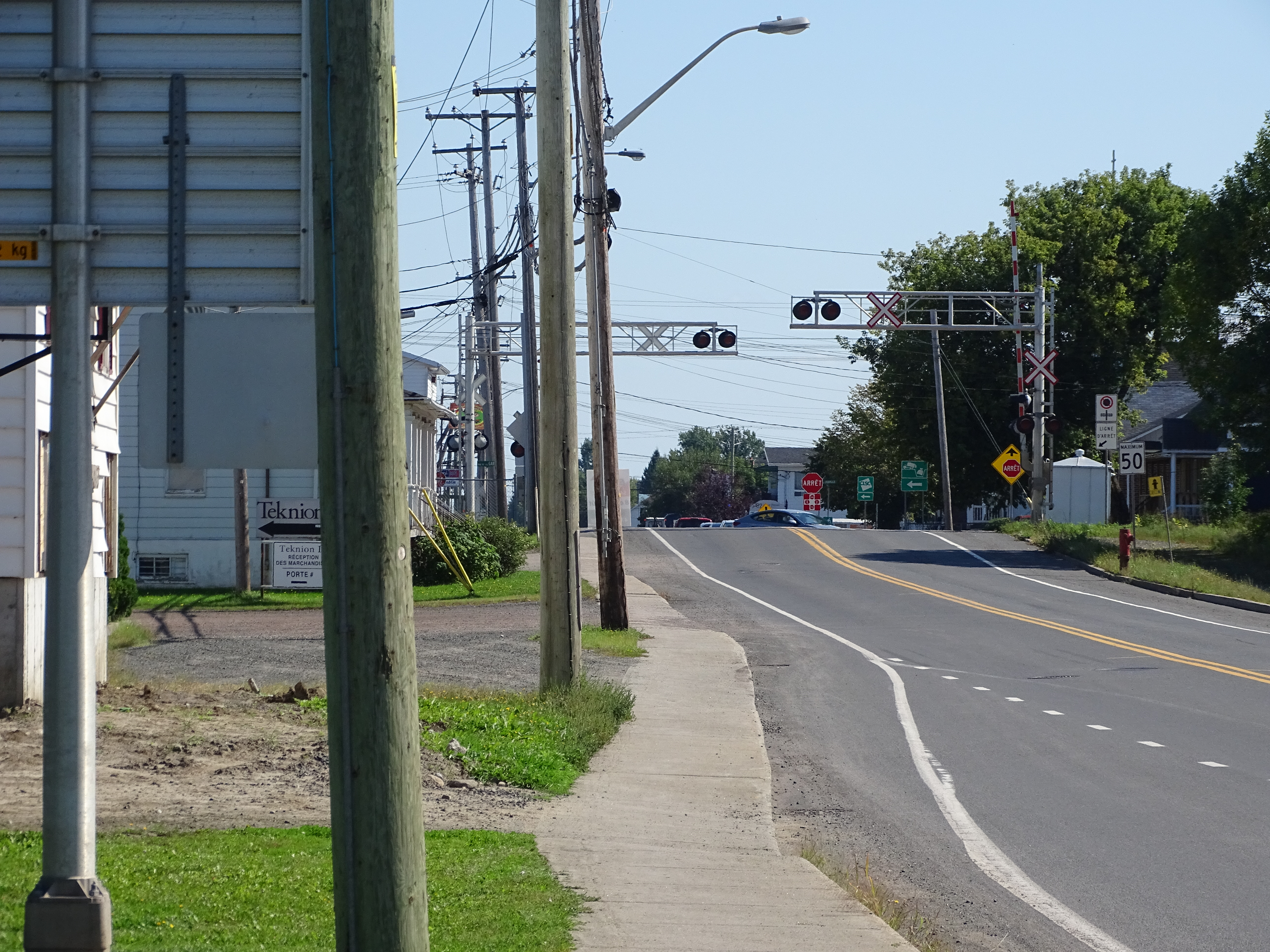
Boulevard Saint-Joseph in Laurier-Station.

== See also ==
- List of Quebec provincial highways
