= Saint-Janvier-de-Joly =

- Municipality
- Aerial view of Saint-Janvier-de-Joly

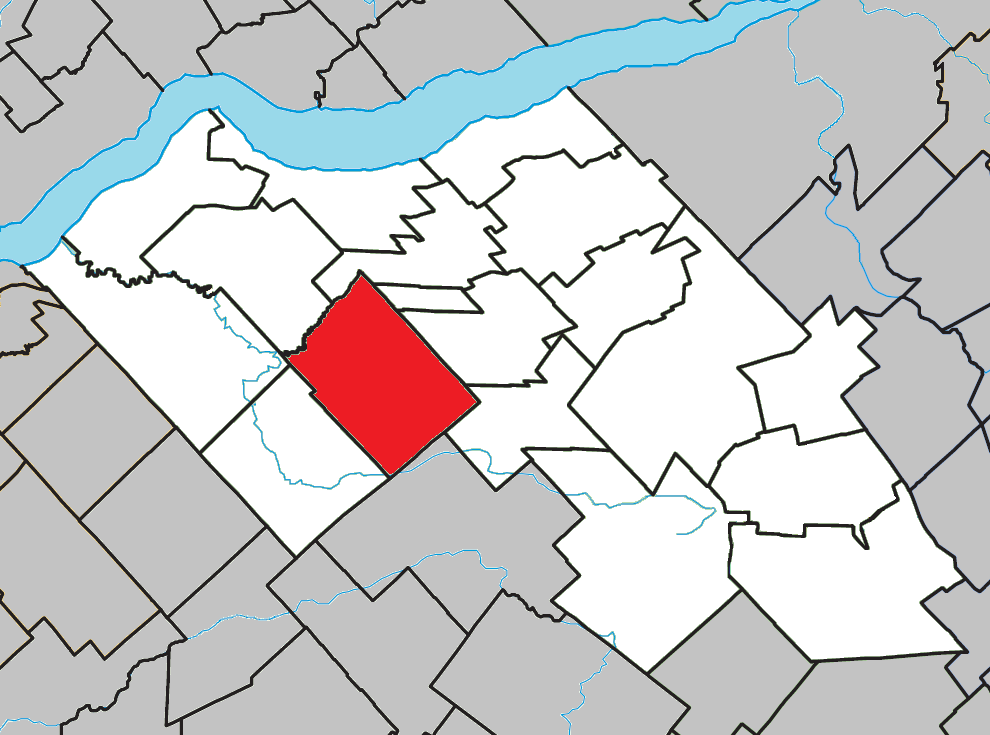
- Location within Lotbinière RCM.

- Location in southern Quebec.
- Coordinates: 46°29′N 71°40′W
- Country: Canada
- Province: Quebec
- Region: Chaudière-Appalaches
- RCM: Lotbinière
- Constituted: January 1, 1944

Government
  - Mayor: Jean-Philippe René
  - Federal riding: Mégantic—L'Érable—Lotbinière
  - Prov. riding: Lotbinière-Frontenac

Area
  - Total: 111.40 km^{2} (43.01 sq mi)
  - Land: 109.88 km^{2} (42.42 sq mi)

Population (2021)
  - Total: 1,079
  - Density: 9.8/km^{2} (25/sq mi)
  - Pop 2016-2021: ▲9.7%
  - Dwellings: 500
- Time zone: UTC−5 (EST)
  - Summer (DST): UTC−4 (EDT)
- Postal code(s): G0S 1M0
- Area codes: 418 and 581
- Website: www.municipalite dejoly.com

Saint-Janvier-de-Joly (French pronunciation: [sɛ̃ ʒɑ̃vje də ʒɔli]) is a municipality in Lotbinière Regional County Municipality in Quebec, Canada. It is part of the Chaudière-Appalaches region and had a population is 1,079 as of 2021.

It is named after Reverend Janvier Lachance, a missionary, who served the parish from 1914 to 1926. "Joly" honours Quebec Premier Henri-Gustave Joly de Lotbinière, the owner of the seigneurie of Lotbinière, which included Saint-Janvier-de-Joly.

The post office, opened in 1924, is called Joly, name under which the municipality is most commonly known.
