= Cugnet River =

River in Chaudière-Appalaches, Quebec (Canada)

- Location within Quebec
- Native name: Rivière Cugnet (French)

Location
- Country: Canada
- Province: Quebec
- Administrative region: Chaudière-Appalaches
- RCM: Lotbinière Regional County Municipality

Physical characteristics
- Source: Agricultural streams
  - location: Saint-Lambert-de-Lauzon
  - coordinates: 46.545537°N 71.212042°W
  - elevation: 143 metres (469 ft)
- Mouth: Beaurivage River
  - location: Saint-Étienne-de-Lauzon
  - coordinates: 46.59278°N 71.35722°W
  - elevation: 1,104 metres (3,622 ft)
- Length: 15.4 kilometres (9.6 mi)

Basin features
- Progression: Beaurivage River, Chaudière River, St. Lawrence
- Tributaries
  - left: (upstream)
  - right: (upstream)

The Cugnet river (in French: rivière Cugnet) is a tributary of the Beaurivage River which is a tributary of the west bank of the Chaudière River (slope of the south bank of the St. Lawrence River). It flows in the municipality of Saint-Lambert-de-Lauzon of the Lotbinière Regional County Municipality and in the Saint-Étienne-de-Lauzon of the city of Lévis, in the administrative region of Chaudière-Appalaches, in Quebec, in Canada.

== Geography ==
The main neighboring watersheds of the Cugnet river are:

- north side: Beaurivage River, Chaudière River;
- east side: Chaudière River;
- south side: Malbrook stream, Bras d'Henri, Beaurivage River;
- West side: rivière aux Pins, Noire River, rivière Rouge, Beaurivage River.

The Cugnet river takes its source south of "rue du Pont", in the Saint-Lambert-de-Lauzon area of the city of Lévis. This headland is located near the northern limit of the municipality of Saint-Bernard (MRC de La Nouvelle-Beauce Regional County Municipality), to the south-east of the village "Parc Boutin "in Saint-Lambert-de-Lauzon and at 1.2 kilometres (0.75 mi) west of the Chaudière River.

From its source, the Cugnet River flows in agricultural and forest areas over 15.4 kilometres (9.6 mi) divided into the following segments:

- 4.1 kilometres (2.5 mi) north, up to route 218 which it intersects at 1.8 kilometres (1.1 mi) southwest of the bridge spanning the Chaudière River;
- 6.5 kilometres (4.0 mi) towards the west, up to the road separating the sectors of Saint-Lambert-de-Lauzon (south side) and Saint-Étienne-de-Lauzon (North Coast);
- 4.8 kilometres (3.0 mi) westward, up to its confluence.

The Cugnet river empties on the eastern bank of the Beaurivage River in the hamlet "Pointe Saint-Gilles". This confluence is located at:

- 200 metres (660 ft) downstream of the bridge separating the Lotbinière Regional County Municipality and the town of Lévis (Saint-Étienne-de-Lauzon sector);
- downstream from the village of Saint-Gilles;
- 1.5 kilometres (0.93 mi) (or 0.8 kilometres (0.50 mi) in a direct line) upstream of the confluence of the Noire River;
- 3.5 kilometres (2.2 mi) (or 2.0 kilometres (1.2 mi) in a direct line) upstream of the confluence of the Rouge River;
- upstream of the hamlet "chemin Craig".

== Toponymy ==
The term "Cugnet" constitutes a family name of French origin.

The toponym "Cugnet river" evokes the life work of François-Joseph Cugnet, Lord of Saint-Étienne. Cugnet has also worked as judge, attorney general, grand voyer, official translator and French secretary to the governor and the Council of Quebec, clerk of the terrier and lawyer. He was born on June 26, 1720, in Quebec. He is the eldest son of François-Étienne Cugnet and Louise-Madeleine Dusautoy (Dusaultoir). He died in this town on November 16, 1789.

The toponym "rivière Cugnet" was made official on December 5, 1968, at the Commission de toponymie du Québec.

== See also ==
- List of rivers of Quebec
