= Bras d'Henri =

River in Chaudière-Appalaches, Quebec (Canada)

- Location within Quebec

Location
- Country: Canada
- Province: Quebec
- Administrative region: Chaudière-Appalaches
- RCM: La Nouvelle-Beauce Regional County Municipality, Lotbinière Regional County Municipality

Physical characteristics
- Source: Agricultural streams
  - location: Saint-Elzéar
  - coordinates: 46.405235°N 71.120582°W
  - elevation: 285 metres (935 ft)
- Mouth: Beaurivage River
  - location: Saint-Gilles
  - coordinates: 46.55139°N 71.35833°W
  - elevation: 115 metres (377 ft)
- Length: 32.5 kilometres (20.2 mi)

Basin features
- Progression: Beaurivage River, Chaudière River, St. Lawrence
- Tributaries
  - left: (upstream) Petit bras d'Henri
  - right: (upstream) ruisseau Malbrook, cours d'eau de la Judée

The Bras d'Henri is a tributary of the Beaurivage River which is a tributary of the west bank of the Chaudière River (slope of the south bank of the Saint-Laurent). It flows in the municipality of Saint-Elzéar, Saint-Bernard, Saint-Narcisse-de-Beaurivage, in the Saint-Étienne-de-Lauzon sector of the city of Lévis and Saint-Gilles, in the Lotbinière Regional County Municipality, in the administrative region of Chaudière-Appalaches, in Quebec, in Canada.

== Geography ==
The main neighboring watersheds of the Bras d'Henri river are:

- north side: Beaurivage River, Chaudière River, Cugnet River;
- east side: Malbrook stream, Chaudière River Vallée River, Savoie River;
- south side: Beaurivage River;
- West side: rivière aux Pins, Noire River, Rouge River, Beaurivage River.

Le Bras d'Henri has its source in the municipality of Saint-Elzéar at 4.2 kilometres (2.6 mi) west of the village center. This headland is located north of route 216, north of the head of the Savoie River (tributary of the Richelieu River) and 5.5 kilometres (3.4 mi) southeast of the Chaudière River.

From its source, the Bras d'Henri river flows mainly in agricultural areas over 32.5 kilometres (20.2 mi) divided into the following segments:

- 3.0 kilometres (1.9 mi) northwesterly, in Saint-Elzéar, up to the limit of Saint-Bernard;
- 2.0 kilometres (1.2 mi) north-west, to the route du rang Saint-Henri;
- 4.6 kilometres (2.9 mi) north, up to the route du rang Saint-Georges-Ouest;
- 4.1 kilometres (2.5 mi) north into Saint-Bernard, to the limit of Saint-Narcisse-de-Beaurivage;
- 2.1 kilometres (1.3 mi) north-west, to a road;
- 5.1 kilometres (3.2 mi) north-west, up to the limit of Saint-Étienne-de-Lauzon;
- 0.3 kilometres (0.19 mi) towards the west, in Saint-Étienne-de-Lauzon, up to the limit of Saint-Narcisse-de-Beaurivage;
- 4.5 kilometres (2.8 mi) towards the southwest, to route 218 (i.e. at the confluence of Petit bras d'Henri (coming from the south)) which drains the village of Saint-Narcisse-de-Beaurivage;
- 4.8 kilometres (3.0 mi) north to a road;
- 2.0 kilometres (1.2 mi) north-west, to its confluence.

Le Bras d'Henri empties on the east bank of the Beaurivage River at 4.1 kilometres (2.5 mi) (in a direct line) north of the village of Saint-Gilles and south of the hamlet "Pointe-Saint-Gilles".

== Toponymy ==
The toponym "Bras d'Henri" was made official on December 5, 1968, at the Commission de toponymie du Québec.

== See also ==
- List of rivers of Quebec
