= Rivière des Îles Brûlées =

River in Chaudière-Appalaches, Quebec, Canada

- Location within Quebec

Location
- Country: Canada
- Province: Quebec
- Administrative region: Chaudière-Appalaches
- RCM: La Nouvelle-Beauce Regional County Municipality

Physical characteristics
- Source: Agricultural streams
  - location: Saint-Bernard
  - coordinates: 46.448658°N 71.154223°W
  - elevation: 216 metres (709 ft)
- Mouth: Chaudière River
  - location: Saint-Bernard
  - coordinates: 46.535°N 71.15222°W
  - elevation: 126 metres (413 ft)
- Length: 13.0 kilometres (8.1 mi)

Basin features
- Progression: Chaudière River, St. Lawrence
- Tributaries
  - left: (upstream) cours d'eau Bougie
  - right: (upstream) Cours d'eau Garon

The Rivière des Îles Brûlées (in English: river of burned islands) is a tributary of the west shore of the Chaudière River which flows northward to empty onto the south shore of the St. Lawrence River. It flows in the municipality of Saint-Bernard, in the La Nouvelle-Beauce Regional County Municipality (MRC), in the administrative region of Chaudière-Appalaches, in Quebec, in Canada.

== Geography ==
The main neighboring watersheds of the Brûlées River are:

- north side: Bougie stream, Chaudière River;
- east side: Vallée River, Chaudière River;
- south side: Vallée River, Bras d'Henri, Beaurivage River;
- west side: Petit Bras d'Henri, Beaurivage River.

The Rivière des Îles Brûlées has its source in an agricultural zone northwest of the route du rang Saint-Henri, in the municipality of Saint-Bernard. This headland is located at 5.5 kilometres (3.4 mi) southwest of the center of the village of Saint-Bernard, at 7.1 kilometres (4.4 mi) west of the Chaudière River and 7.1 kilometres (4.4 mi) east of the center of the village of Saint-Patrice-de-Beaurivage.

From its source, the Îles Brûlées river "flows over 13.0 kilometres (8.1 mi) divided into the following segments:

- 2.1 kilometres (1.3 mi) north to a country road;
- 2.0 kilometres (1.2 mi) north-east, to the route du rang Saint-Luc;
- 2.9 kilometres (1.8 mi) northeasterly, up to the rang Saint-Georges-Ouest road which crosses the village of Saint-Bernard;
- 1.7 kilometres (1.1 mi) west, up to the confluence of the Bougie stream;
- 4.3 kilometres (2.7 mi) north, up to its confluence.

The Îles Brûlées river flows on the west bank of the Chaudière River, in Saint-Bernard. This confluence is located downstream of the bridge in the village of Scott and upstream of the Saint-Lambert-de-Lauzon bridge.

== Toponymy ==
The toponym Rivière des Îles Brûlées was formalized on August 8, 1977, at the Commission de toponymie du Québec.

== See also ==
- List of rivers of Quebec
