= Vallée River =

River in Chaudière-Appalaches, Quebec (Canada)

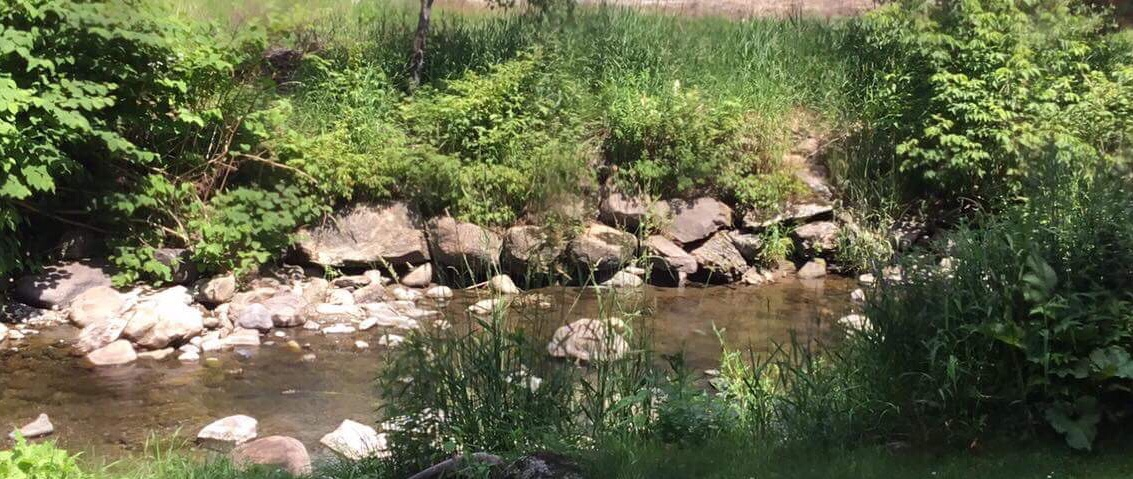

- Location within Quebec
- Native name: Rivière Vallée (French)

Location
- Country: Canada
- Province: Quebec
- Administrative region: Chaudière-Appalaches
- RCM: La Nouvelle-Beauce Regional County Municipality

Physical characteristics
- Source: Agricultural streams
  - location: Saint-Elzéar
  - coordinates: 46.404489°N 71.096444°W
  - elevation: 356 metres (1,168 ft)
- Mouth: Chaudière River
  - location: Saint-Marie-de-Beauce
  - coordinates: 46.46722°N 71.06028°W
  - elevation: 142 metres (466 ft)
- Length: 9.8 kilometres (6.1 mi)

Basin features
- Progression: Chaudière River, St. Lawrence
- Tributaries
  - left: (upstream)
  - right: (upstream)

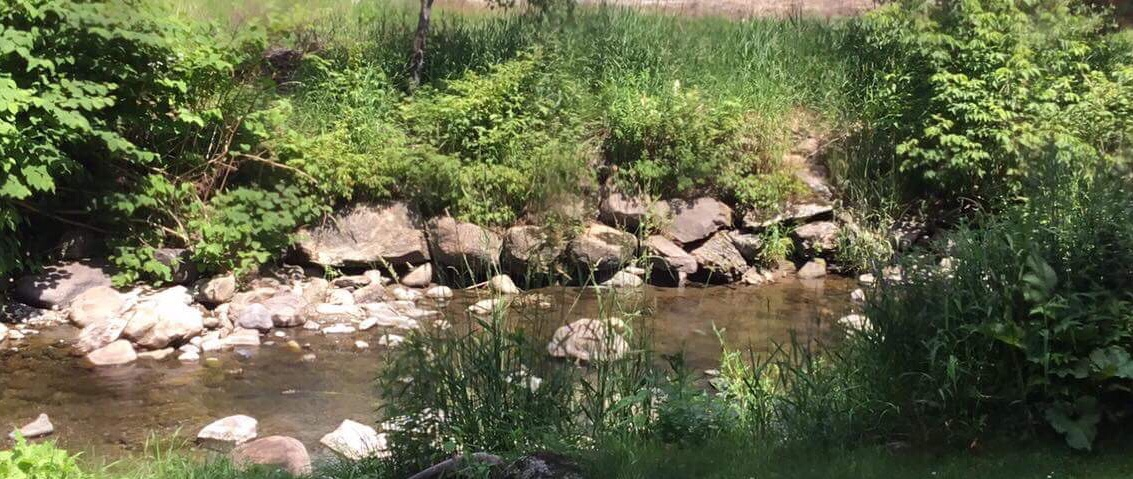
Rivière Vallée

The Vallée River (in French: rivière Vallée) is a tributary of the west bank of the Chaudière River which flows northward to empty onto the south bank of the St. Lawrence River. It flows in the municipalities of Saint-Elzéar and Siante-Marie-de-Beauce, in the La Nouvelle-Beauce Regional County Municipality, in the administrative region of Chaudière-Appalaches, in Quebec, in Canada.

== Geography ==
The main neighboring watersheds of the Vallée river are:

- north side: rivière des Îles Brûlées, Chaudière River;
- east side: Chaudière River, Saint-Elzéar stream;
- south side: Aulnaies stream, Savoie River;
- west side: Beaurivage River.

The Vallée river has its source in a mountainous area, in the municipality of Saint-Elzéar. This head area is located 2.5 kilometres (1.6 mi) west of the center of the village of Saint-Elzéar, at 6.0 kilometres (3.7 mi) west of Chaudière River and 8.0 kilometres (5.0 mi) northeast of Mont-Sainte-Marguerite.

From its source, the Vallée River flows over 9.8 kilometres (6.1 mi) in agricultural and forest areas, divided into the following segments:

- 1.5 kilometres (0.93 mi) north, in Saint-Elzéar, to a country road;
- 3.8 kilometres (2.4 mi) north, up to the route du rang du Bas Saint-Jacques;
- 2.1 kilometres (1.3 mi) northeasterly, up to the municipal limit of Sainte-Marie-de-Beauce;
- 2.4 kilometres (1.5 mi) north-east, crossing route 171, up to its confluence.

The Vallée river empties on the west bank of the Chaudière River, in Sainte-Marie-de-Beauce. This confluence is located 0.6 kilometres (0.37 mi) upstream from Île Perreault, 4.2 kilometres (2.6 mi) downstream from the bridge in the village of Sainte-Marie-de-Beauce and 4.0 kilometres (2.5 mi) upstream of the Scott bridge.

== Toponymy ==
The toponym Rivière Vallée was formalized on August 8, 1977, at the Commission de toponymie du Québec.

== See also ==
- List of rivers of Quebec
