= Noire River (Beaurivage River tributary) =

River in Chaudière-Appalaches, Quebec (Canada)

- Location within Quebec
- Native name: Rivière River (French)

Location
- Country: Canada
- Province: Quebec
- Administrative region: Chaudière-Appalaches
- RCM: Lotbinière Regional County Municipality, Lévis (City)

Physical characteristics
- Source: Agricultural streams
  - location: Saint-Flavien
  - coordinates: 46.494986°N 71.580181°W
  - elevation: 140 metres (460 ft)
- Mouth: Beaurivage River
  - location: Lévis (sector Saint-Étienne-de-Lauzon)
  - coordinates: 46.598332°N 71.364434°W
  - elevation: 103 metres (338 ft)
- Length: 22.4 kilometres (13.9 mi)

Basin features
- Progression: Beaurivage River, Chaudière River, St. Lawrence
- Tributaries
  - left: (upstream) ruisseau de la Tannerie
  - right: (upstream)

The rivière Noire (in English: Black River) is a tributary of the Beaurivage River which is a tributary of the east bank of the Chaudière River (slope of the south bank of the St. Lawrence River), in the administrative region of Chaudière-Appalaches, in Quebec, in Canada. It flows in the municipalities of Saint-Flavien, Saint-Agapit, Saint-Gilles (Lotbinière Regional County Municipality) and in the city of Lévis (Saint-Étienne-de-Lauzon sector).

== Geography ==
The main neighboring watersheds of the Noire River are:

- north side: Rouge River, Aulneuse River, Beaurivage River, rivière des Moulanges;
- east side: Beaurivage River, Chaudière River;
- south side: Rivière du Loup, rivière aux Pins, Henri River, rivière aux Cèdres;
- west side: Bourret stream, Bois Franc-Pierriche stream, rivière aux Ormes, rivière aux Cèdres, Henri River.

The Black River has its source in the municipality of Saint-Flavien. This headland is located southwest of route 271, at 4.6 kilometres (2.9 mi) northwest of the center of the village of Dosquet and at 2.0 kilometres (1.2 mi) southeast of the village of Saint-Flavien.

From its source, the Black River flows on 22.4 kilometres (13.9 mi), with a drop of 37 metres (121 ft), divided into the following segments:

- 0.9 kilometres (0.56 mi) eastward, to route 271;
- 2.1 kilometres (1.3 mi) northeasterly, to Rang des Pointes road;
- 5.2 kilometres (3.2 mi) north-east, up to the limit of Saint-Agapit;
- 6.3 kilometres (3.9 mi) north-east, to the road that it intersects at 0.6 kilometres (0.37 mi) north-west of the center of the village of Saint-Agapit;
- 5.7 kilometres (3.5 mi) northeasterly, up to the limit of Saint-Gilles;
- 1.9 kilometres (1.2 mi) towards the northeast, in Saint-Gilles, crossing route 116, to the limit of Saint-Étienne-de-Lauzon;
- 0.3 kilometres (0.19 mi) north-west, up to its confluence.

The Black River empties on the west bank of the Beaurivage River in the hamlet "Pointe-Saint-Gilles", in the town of Lévis (sector of Saint-Étienne-de-Lauzon).

== Toponymy ==
The toponym "Rivière Noire" was made official on January 22, 1974, in the place name bank of the Commission de toponymie du Québec.

== See also ==
- List of rivers of Quebec
