= Aulneuse River =

River in Chaudière-Appalaches, Quebec (Canada)

- Location within Quebec
- Native name: Rivière Aulneuse (French)

Location
- Country: Canada
- Province: Quebec
- Region: Chaudière-Appalaches
- MRC: Lotbinière Regional County Municipality

Physical characteristics
- Source: Agricultural and forest streams
  - location: Saint-Apollinaire
  - coordinates: 46.58842°N 71.476588°W
  - elevation: 128 metres (420 ft)
- Mouth: St. Lawrence River
  - location: Saint-Nicolas
  - coordinates: 46.70889°N 71.38222°W
  - elevation: 4 metres (13 ft)
- Length: 26.2 kilometres (16.3 mi)

Basin features
- River system: St. Lawrence River
- Tributaries
  - left: (upstream) rivière des Moulanges, ruisseau Le Rigolet
  - right: (upstream) ruisseau Simoneau

The Aulneuse River (French: rivière Aulneuse) is a tributary of the south shore of the St. Lawrence River. This river flows through the municipalities of Saint-Apollinaire and the town of Lévis (Saint-Nicolas sector), in the administrative region of Chaudière-Appalaches, in Quebec, in Canada.

== Geography ==
The main neighboring watersheds of the Aulneuse river are:

- North side: St. Lawrence River;
- East side: Prairies stream, Chaudière River, Beaurivage River;
- South side: Beaurivage River, Loup River;
- West side: Rondeau creek, Bourret creek, Bois Franc creek, Huron River, St. Lawrence River.

The Aulneuse river has its source in an agricultural and forest zone at 2.8 kilometres (1.7 mi) west of the Lac-du-Sacré-Coeur hamlet of Saint-Apollinaire, at 3.8 kilometres (2.4 mi) at south-east of the village of Saint-Apollinaire and at 4.1 kilometres (2.5 mi) north-west of the center of the village of Saint-Agapit. This zone is located on the west side of route 273.

The Aulneuse river flows over 26.2 kilometres (16.3 mi) with a drop of 124 metres (407 ft), divided into the following segments:

From its head area, the Aulneuse river flows over:

- 3.4 kilometres (2.1 mi) eastward, to the hamlet of Lac-du-Sacré-Coeur bridge;
- 3.5 kilometres (2.2 mi) northeasterly, up to the limit between the municipalities of Saint-Apollinaire and Saint-Étienne-de-Lauzon;
- 1.6 kilometres (0.99 mi) north-west, up to the same intermunicipal limit;
- 1.4 kilometres (0.87 mi) north-west, crossing the route du rang de Gaspé, up to the municipal limit of Saint-Étienne-de-Lauzon and Lévis (Saint-Nicolas sector);
- 3.0 kilometres (1.9 mi) north-east, in Lévis (Saint-Nicolas sector), to highway 20;
- 12.9 kilometres (8.0 mi) north-east, up to route 132, in Lévis (Saint-Nicolas sector);
- 0.4 kilometres (0.25 mi) north, up to its confluence.

After crossing the falls at Desrochers, the Aulneuse river flows over the flats of Anse Ross, on the south shore of the estuary of Saint Lawrence, on the east side of the river of the village of Saint-Nicolas in the town of Lévis and west of the hamlet of La Citrouille. Its confluence is located west of the confluence of the Chaudière River.

== Toponymy ==
The origin of this toponym is associated with the alders which constitute a tree growing along its banks. This plant thrives mostly in moist or well-watered soils.

The toponym of this watercourse has existed since at least the end of the 18th Century, when the first settlers settled in the current sector of Saint-Nicolas. In the 18th century, the Abenakis came to spend the summer near its confluence. At the beginning of the 19th century, the development at the mouth of this watercourse favored the establishment of Ross work sites devoted mainly to forestry; their activities ceased around 1889.

The Aulneuse river has been designated according to several toponyms. A seigneurial plan of 1815 and a map by the Bayfield hydrographer (1859) give it the English name of "Gaspé River". Cartographic and other documents dating from 1925, 1937, 1953 and 1966, indicate the name of Rivière Auneuse. Other sources show Rivière des Aunes (1912), Rivière aux Neux (1916), Rivière aux Nœuds (1918), Rivière Noailles (1976), Rivière Rouard (1918), Rivière Rouër (1918), Rivière Vicontent (1846, 1915 and 1937).

The toponym “Rivière Aulneuse” was made official on March 9, 1988, at the Commission de toponymie du Québec.

== See also ==
- List of rivers of Quebec
