= Rivière aux Pins (Beaurivage River tributary) =

- Location within Quebec

Location
- Country: Canada
- Province: Quebec
- Region: Chaudière-Appalaches
- Regional County Municipality: Lotbinière Regional County Municipality

Physical characteristics
- Source: Agricultural creek
  - location: Saint-Agapit
  - coordinates: 46°30′38″N 71°29′22″W
  - elevation: 148 m
- Mouth: Beaurivage River
  - location: Lévis
  - coordinates: 46°34′33″N 71°21′59″W
  - elevation: 110 m
- Length: 14.14 km (8.79 mi)

Basin features
- Tributaries
  - left: (Upward from the mouth) ruisseau Paquet, ruisseau Giroux
  - right: (Upward from the mouth) rivière du Loup, ruisseau Laflamme, cours d'eau Beaudoin-Bourgault.

The Rivière aux Pins is a tributary of the Beaurivage River which is a tributary of the west bank of the Chaudière River (slope of the south bank of the St. Lawrence River). It flows in the municipalities of Saint-Agapit and Saint-Gilles in the Lotbinière Regional County Municipality, in the administrative region of Chaudière-Appalaches, in Quebec, in Canada.

== Geography ==
The main watersheds neighbors of the Rivière aux Pins are:

- north side: Rouge River, Noire River, Aulneuse River, Beaurivage River;
- east side: Beaurivage River, Chaudière River;
- south side: Henri RIver, Beaurivage River;
- west side: rivière du Loup (Chaudière), Henri River, Rivière aux Cèdres.

The Rivière aux Pins rises in the municipality of Saint-Gilles, on the boundary with the municipality of Dosquet. This head area is located west of route 116, northeast of the center of the village of Dosquet and southwest of village of Saint-Agapit.

From its source, the Rivière aux Pins flows over 19.4 km divided into the following segments:

- 0.6 km east, to route 116;
- 3.0 km east to the municipal limit of Saint-Gilles;
- 2.1 km north-east, in Saint-Gilles, parallel (on the south-east side) to the municipal limit of Saint-Agapit;
- 2.0 km north-east, to the road which it cuts 0.6 km north-west of the center of the village of Saint-Agapit;
- 5.7 km north-east, in Saint-Agapit, to the limit of Saint-Gilles;
- 0.8 km north-east, in Saint-Gilles crossing route 273, to the limit of Saint-Agapit;
- 1.0 km northeasterly, to the limit of Saint-Gilles;
- 3.9 km to the northeast, collecting the Laflamme stream (coming from the southwest) and the Rivière du Loup (coming from the west), to route 269;
- 0.3 km east, to its confluence.

The Rivière aux Pins flows on the west bank of the Beaurivage River south of the hamlet Pointe-Saint-Gilles, in Saint-Gilles.

== Toponymy ==
The toponym Rivière aux Pins was formalized on December 5, 1968, at the Commission de toponymie du Québec.

== See also ==
- List of rivers of Quebec
