= Rouge River (Beaurivage River tributary) =

River in Chaudière-Appalaches, Quebec, Canada

- Location within Quebec
- Native name: Rivière Rouge (French)

Location
- Country: Canada
- Province: Quebec
- Administrative region: Chaudière-Appalaches
- RCM: Lotbinière Regional County Municipality, Lévis (City)

Physical characteristics
- Source: Agricultural streams
  - location: Saint-Agapit
  - coordinates: 46.575501°N 71.4650°W
  - elevation: 131 metres (430 ft)
- Mouth: Beaurivage River
  - location: Saint-Sylvestre
  - coordinates: 46.61583°N 71.3625°W
  - elevation: 97 metres (318 ft)
- Length: 10.3 kilometres (6.4 mi)

Basin features
- Progression: Beaurivage River, Chaudière River, St. Lawrence
- Tributaries
  - left: (upstream)
  - right: (upstream)

The Rivière Rouge (in English: Red River) is a tributary of the west shore of Beaurivage River which is a tributary of the west bank of the Chaudière River (slope of the south bank of the St. Lawrence River). It flows in the municipalities of Saint-Agapit and Saint-Apollinaire in the Lotbinière Regional County Municipality, in the administrative region of Chaudière-Appalaches, in Quebec, in Canada.

== Geography ==
The main neighboring watersheds of the Red River are:

- north side: Aulneuse River, Beaurivage River, St. Lawrence River;
- east side: Beaurivage River, Chaudière River;
- south side: Noire River, rivière aux Pins, Henri River, Beaurivage River;
- west side: Henri River, Bourret brook, rivière aux Cèdres, Noire River.

The Red River has its source in the municipality of Saint-Agapit, on the boundary with the municipality of Saint-Apollinaire. This head area is located south of highway 20, southeast of the village center of Saint-Apollinaire and north-west of the village of Saint-Agapit.

From its source, the Red River flows over 10.3 kilometres (6.4 mi) divided into the following segments:

- 1.5 kilometres (0.93 mi) eastward, to route 273;
- 3.8 kilometres (2.4 mi) easterly, along the municipal boundary, to the municipal boundary of Saint-Apollinaire;
- 3.0 kilometres (1.9 mi) towards the northeast, in Saint-Apollinaire, up to the limit of Lévis (sector "Saint-Étienne-de-Lauzon");
- 2.0 kilometres (1.2 mi) northeasterly, up to its confluence.

The Red River empties on the west bank of the Beaurivage River north of the hamlet "Pointe-Saint-Gilles", in Lévis.

== Toponymy ==
The toponym "rivière Rouge" was made official on October 6, 1983, at the Commission de toponymie du Québec.

== See also ==
* List of rivers of Quebec
