= Lévis—Lotbinière =

Federal electoral district in Quebec, Canada

Coordinates: 46°34′N 71°23′W

Quebec electoral district
- Interactive map of riding boundaries from the 2025 federal election

Federal electoral district
- Legislature: House of Commons
MP
Jacques Gourde
Conservative
- District created: 2003
- First contested: 2004
- Last contested: 2021
- District webpage: profile, map

Demographics
- Population (2016): 113,528
- Electors (2019): 89,405
- Area (km²): 2,123
- Pop. density (per km²): 53.5
- Census division(s): Lévis, Lotbinière, La Nouvelle-Beauce
- Census subdivision(s): Lévis (part), Saint-Apollinaire, Saint-Lambert-de-Lauzon, Saint-Agapit, Saint-Gilles, Saint-Antoine-de-Tilly, Saint-Narcisse-de-Beaurivage, Saint-Patrice-de-Beaurivage, Saint-Sylvestre

Lévis—Lotbinière (formerly Lotbinière—Chutes-de-la-Chaudière) is a federal electoral district in the province of Quebec, Canada, that has been represented in the House of Commons of Canada since 2004.

It was created in 2003 from parts of Lévis-et-Chutes-de-la-Chaudière and Lotbinière—L'Érable ridings.

== Geography ==
Located southwest of Quebec City along the Saint Lawrence River, the riding includes parts of the city's south shore suburbs.

It consists of:

- the Regional County Municipality of Lotbinière;
- the part of the City of Lévis comprising: the former cities of Saint-Nicolas, Charny, Saint-Jean-Chrysostome and Saint-Rédempteur, the former Municipality of Saint-Étienne-de-Lauzon, and the former Parish Municipality of Sainte-Hélène-de-Breakeyville; and
- the Parish Municipality of Saint-Lambert-de-Lauzon in the Regional County Municipality of La Nouvelle-Beauce.

The neighbouring ridings are Bellechasse—Les Etchemins—Lévis, Beauce, Mégantic—L'Érable—Lotbinière, Saint-Augustin—Portneuf—Jacques-Cartier, and Louis-Hébert.

As per the 2012 federal electoral redistribution, this riding was renamed Lévis—Lotbinière. Its territory remained largely the same, receiving a small portion from Mégantic—L'Érable.

Following the 2022 Canadian federal electoral redistribution, the riding gained the area west of 4e Av. and Rue St-Eustache in Lévis from Bellechasse—Les Etchemins—Lévis, and lost the municipalities of Leclercville, Val-Alain, Lotbinière, Sainte-Croix, Saint-Édouard-de-Lotbinière, Notre-Dame-du-Sacré-Coeur-d'Issoudun, Saint-Janvier-de-Joly, Laurier-Station, Saint-Flavien, Dosquet, and Sainte-Agathe-de-Lotbinière to Mégantic—L'Érable—Lotbinière.

== Demographics ==
According to the 2021 Canadian census

Ethnic groups: 95.9% White, 1.4% Indigenous, 1.0% Black

Languages: 96.6% French, 1.0% English

Religions: 72.5% Christian (64.6% Catholic, 7.9% Other), 26.4% None

Median income: $47,600 (2020)

Average income: $54,600 (2020)

== Members of Parliament ==
This riding has elected the following members of Parliament:

Parliament	Years	Member	Party
Lotbinière—Chutes-de-la-Chaudière; Riding created from Lévis-et-Chutes-de-la-Chaudière and Lotbinière—L'Érable
38th	2004–2006	Odina Desrochers	Bloc Québécois
39th	2006–2008	Jacques Gourde	Conservative
40th	2008–2011	Jacques Gourde	Conservative
41st	2011–2015	Jacques Gourde	Conservative
Lévis—Lotbinière
42nd	2015–2019	Jacques Gourde	Conservative
43rd	2019–2021	Jacques Gourde	Conservative
44th	2021–2025	Jacques Gourde	Conservative
45th	2025–present	Jacques Gourde	Conservative

== Election results ==
=== Lévis—Lotbinière, 2023 representation order ===
2025 Canadian federal election
Party	Candidate	Votes	%	±%	Expenditures
Conservative	Jacques Gourde	33,312	47.71	−1.99	$83,283.33
Liberal	Ghislain Daigle	20,549	29.43	+14.06	$3,152.73
Bloc Québécois	Pierre Julien	13,627	19.52	−3.30	$10,562.41
New Democratic	Molly Cornish	1,635	2.34	−4.94	$0.00
People's	Pier-Olivier Roy	698	1.00	−1.38	$2,122.25
Total valid votes/expense limit		69,821	98.72	–	$137.259.24
Total rejected ballots		906	1.28		
Turnout		70,727	76.76		
Eligible voters		92,136			
Conservative notional hold		Swing		−8.03	
Source: Elections Canada
Note: number of eligible voters does not include voting day registrations.

2021 federal election redistributed results
Party	Vote	%
Conservative	30,333	49.70
Bloc Québécois	13,929	22.82
Liberal	9,380	15.37
New Democratic	4,445	7.28
People's	1,450	2.38
Green	824	1.35
Others	674	1.10

=== Lévis—Lotbinière, 2013 representation order ===
This riding was renamed Lévis—Lotbinière, and received a small portion of territory from Mégantic—L'Érable for the 42nd Canadian federal election.

2021 Canadian federal election
Party	Candidate	Votes	%	±%	Expenditures
Conservative	Jacques Gourde	32,731	51.6	+7.0	$70,182.58
Bloc Québécois	Samuel Lamarche	13,740	21.7	-3.4	$6,762.35
Liberal	Ghislain Daigle	9,286	14.6	-2.4	$5,447.42
New Democratic	Guylaine Dumont	4,497	7.1	+0.2	$3,939.53
People's	Benoit Simard	1,661	2.6	-0.9	$0.00
Green	Charles-Eugène Bergeron	856	1.4	-1.6	$0.00
Free	Mariève Lemay	541	0.9	N/A	$488.27
Patriote	Carl Brochu	95	0.1	N/A	none listed
Total valid votes/expense limit		63,407	98.4	–	$120,042.23
Total rejected ballots		1,006	1.6		
Turnout		64,413	70.3		
Registered voters		91,618			
Conservative hold		Swing		+5.2	
Source: Elections Canada

2019 Canadian federal election
Party	Candidate	Votes	%	±%	Expenditures
Conservative	Jacques Gourde	28,297	44.57	-5.53	$40,916.04
Bloc Québécois	François-Noël Brault	15,921	25.08	+13.64	$5,169.30
Liberal	Ghislain Daigle	10,761	16.95	-4.72	$8,547.89
New Democratic	Christel Marchand	4,355	6.86	-7.91	$0.10
People's	Marc Fontaine	2,247	3.54	–	none listed
Green	Patrick Kerr	1,908	3.01	+1.21	$336.51
Total valid votes/expense limit		63,489	100.0		
Total rejected ballots		1,241	1.39		
Turnout		64,730	72.00		
Eligible voters		89,405			
Source: Elections Canada

2015 Canadian federal election
Party	Candidate	Votes	%	±%	Expenditures
Conservative	Jacques Gourde	31,357	50.10	+10.22	$87,534.69
Liberal	Claude Boucher	13,562	21.67	+16.58	$20,248.35
New Democratic	Hélène Bilodeau	9,246	14.77	-23.72	$14,490.33
Bloc Québécois	Steve Gagné	7,163	11.44	-3.44	$17,237.82
Green	Tina Biello	1,124	1.80	+0.14	–
Alliance of the North	François Belanger	136	0.22	–	–
Total valid votes/Expense limit		62,588	100.0		$226,709.26
Total rejected ballots		975	–	–	
Turnout		63,563	–	–	
Eligible voters		87,103			
Source: Elections Canada

2011 federal election redistributed results
Party	Vote	%
Conservative	22,469	39.88
New Democratic	21,688	38.49
Bloc Québécois	8,383	14.88
Liberal	2,867	5.09
Green	936	1.66

=== Lotbinière—Chutes-de-la-Chaudière, 2003 representation order ===
2011 Canadian federal election
Party	Candidate	Votes	%	±%	Expenditures
Conservative	Jacques Gourde	22,460	39.88	-7.39	$78,886.19
New Democratic	Tanya Fredette	21,683	38.50	+25.32	$1,427.87
Bloc Québécois	Gaston Gourde	8,381	14.88	-9.70	$28,148.35
Liberal	Nicole Larouche	2,866	5.09	-7.45	$4,858.38
Green	Richard Domm	936	1.66	-0.78	none listed
Total valid votes/Expense limit		56,326	100.0		$89,473.12
Total rejected, unmarked and declined ballots		926	1.62	-0.10	
Turnout		57,252	69.21	+3.06	
Eligible voters		82,725			
Conservative hold		Swing		-16.36	

2008 Canadian federal election
Party	Candidate	Votes	%	±%	Expenditures
Conservative	Jacques Gourde	24,495	47.27	-7.07	$72,248.18
Bloc Québécois	Antoine Sarrazin-Bourgoin	12,738	24.58	-5.06	$19,089.72
New Democratic	Raymond Côté	6,828	13.18	+6.39	$2,654.50
Liberal	Marie-Thérèse Hovington	6,498	12.54	+7.11	$3,272.46
Green	Shirley Picknell	1,265	2.44	-1.37	none listed
Total valid votes/Expense limit		51,824	100.0		$85,174
Total rejected, unmarked and declined ballots		908	1.72	+0.74	
Turnout		52,732	66.15	-2.21	
Eligible voters		79,721			
Conservative hold		Swing		-1.00	

2006 Canadian federal election
Party	Candidate	Votes	%	±%	Expenditures
Conservative	Jacques Gourde	28,236	54.34	+30.20	$45,970.43
Bloc Québécois	Odina Desrochers	15,402	29.64	-16.35	$61,218.95
New Democratic	Raymond Côté	3,529	6.79	+2.50	$2,346.22
Liberal	Éric Paradis	2,820	5.43	-16.02	$17,938.01
Green	Shirley Picknell	1,978	3.81	+0.14	none listed
Total valid votes/Expense limit		51,965	100.0		$78,226
Total rejected, unmarked and declined ballots		513	0.98	-1.41	
Turnout		52,478	68.36		
Eligible voters		76,764			
Conservative gain from Bloc Québécois		Swing		+23.28	

2004 Canadian federal election
Party	Candidate	Votes	%	±%	Expenditures
Bloc Québécois	Odina Desrochers	20,245	45.99	+2.99	$60,246.22
Conservative	Jean Landry	10,628	24.14	+2.95	$8,765.42
Liberal	Anicet Gagné	9,445	21.45	-11.87	$38,282.74
New Democratic	Jean Bernatchez	2,091	4.75	+2.62	$2,905.99
Green	Rama Borne MacDonald	1,615	3.67	–	none listed
Total valid votes/Expense limit		44,024	100.0		$75,906
Total rejected, unmarked and declined ballots		1,076	2.39		
Turnout		45,100	60.42	-3.64	
Eligible voters		74,647			
Bloc Québécois notional hold		Swing		+0.02	
Changes from 2000 are based on redistributed results. Change for the Conservative Party is based on the combined totals of the Canadian Alliance and the Progressive Conservative Party.

2000 federal election redistributed results
Party	Vote	%
Bloc Québécois	19,500	43.00
Liberal	15,109	33.32
Alliance	6,399	14.11
Progressive Conservative	3,210	7.08
New Democratic	966	2.13
Others	161	0.36

== See also ==
- List of Canadian electoral districts
- Historical federal electoral districts of Canada
