= Beaurivage River =

River in Chaudière-Appalaches, Quebec (Canada)

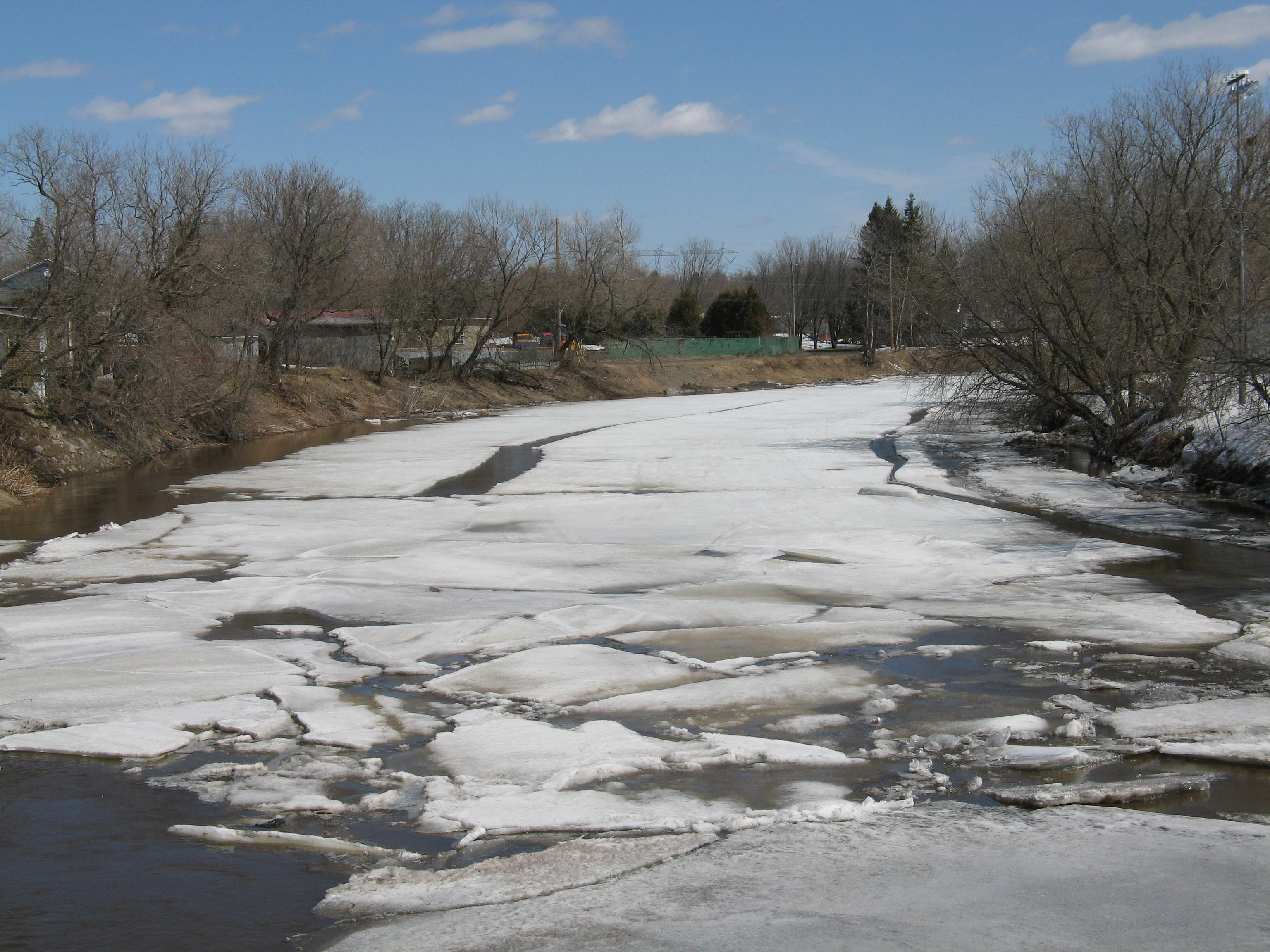
- The river in Saint-Étienne-de-Lauzon

- Location within Quebec
- Native name: Rivière Beaurivage (French)

Location
- Country: Canada
- Province: Quebec
- Administrative region: Chaudière-Appalaches
- RCM: Robert-Cliche Regional County Municipality, La Nouvelle-Beauce Regional County Municipality, Lotbinière Regional County Municipality, Lévis (a city).

Physical characteristics
- Source: Lake Beaurivage
  - location: Saint-Sévérin
  - coordinates: 46.31830°N 71.07699°W
  - elevation: 538 metres (1,765 ft)
- Mouth: Chaudière River
  - location: Saint-Sylvestre
  - coordinates: 46.69260°N 71.27103°W
  - elevation: 70 metres (230 ft)
- Length: 65 kilometres (40 mi)
- Basin size: 750 kilometres (466.03 mi)

Basin features
- Progression: Chaudière River, St. Lawrence
- Tributaries
  - left: (upstream) Le Canal, ruisseau Brise-Fer, Noire River, rivière aux Pins, cours d'eau Lafleur, ruisseau Fraser, ruisseau Gagné, ruisseau Goulet, ruisseau Martin, ruisseau Roger, Filkars River, Bras des Chutes, ruisseau Saint-Jean, cours d'eau Laplante, ruisseau Fermanagh, ruisseau ?, ruisseau du Troisième Rang (décharge du lac Pelchat).
  - right: (upstream) ruisseau Boucher, ruisseau Dubois, ruisseau Béland, Cugnet River, Bras d'Henri, décharge de cinq petits lacs, ruisseau Belfast Ouest, ruisseau ?, cours d'eau des Aulnaies, ruisseau ?, décharge de deux petits lacs.

The Beaurivage River is a tributary of the Chaudière River which in turn flows into the St. Lawrence River.

The Beaurivage river crosses the Quebec municipalities (in Canada) of:

- MRC Robert-Cliche Regional County Municipality: municipality of Saint-Séverin;
- MRC La Nouvelle-Beauce Regional County Municipality: municipality of Saint-Elzéar;
- MRC of Lotbinière Regional County Municipality: municipalities of Saint-Sylvestre, Saint-Patrice-de-Beaurivage and Saint-Gilles;
- Lévis, a city.

The Beaurivage River is a river in Quebec that flows from Thetford Mines and empties in the Chaudière River, near Saint-Romuald, Quebec. It is a body of water mostly known for its annual canoe race beginning at Saint-Patrice-de-Beaurivage, Quebec and finishing at Saint-Gilles, Quebec.

== Geography ==
The main neighboring watersheds of the Beaurivage river are:

- north side: Chaudière River, St. Lawrence River;
- east side: Chaudière River, Cugnet River, Bras d'Henri;
- south side: Fourchette River, Saint-André River, Armagh River, Filkars River, Palmer River;
- west side: Noire River, Rouge River, Du Chêne River, Henri River.

The Beaurivage river is a river of Quebec, whose sources begin on the heights which crown the township of Broughton, (MRC Les Appalaches Regional County Municipality), in the part East of the municipality of Saint-Sylvestre, almost at the limit of Saint-Séverin. This head area is located east of Mont Handkerchief, south-east of Mont Sainte-Marguerite, south of Mont Saint-André and west of the village of Saint-Séverin.

Its course crosses several marshy sectors and draws many meanders. It receives the Bras d'Henri at the height of Saint-Gilles, then makes a bend in an easterly direction, which allows it to water Saint-Étienne-de-Lauzon and join the Chaudière River a few kilometers before the falls, near Saint-Rédempteur.

About 65 kilometres (40 mi) long, the Beaurivage drains a basin of some 750 kilometres (466.03 mi).

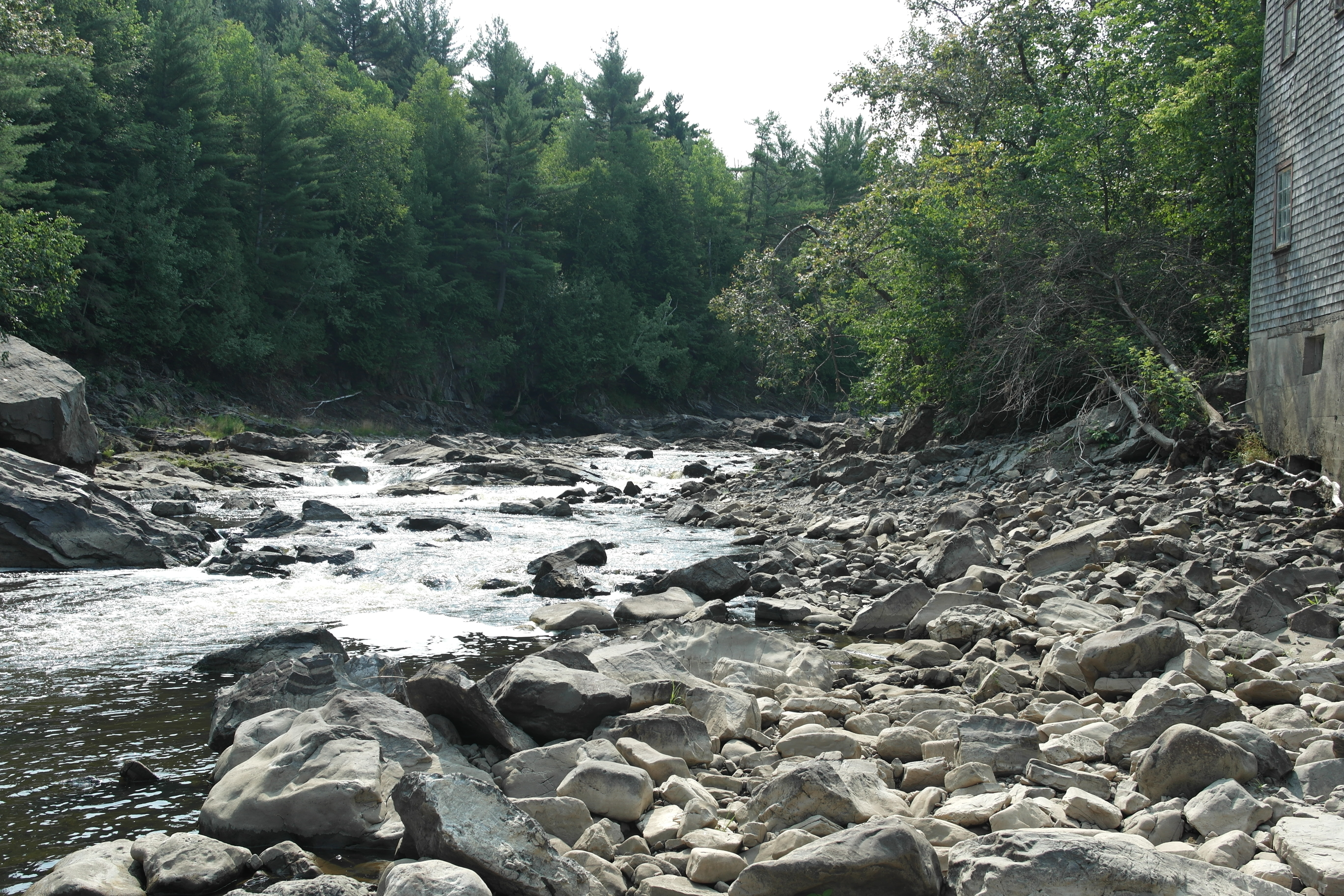
Rapids of the Beaurivage river behind the Gosselin mill in Saint-Étienne-de-Lauzon (Lévis)

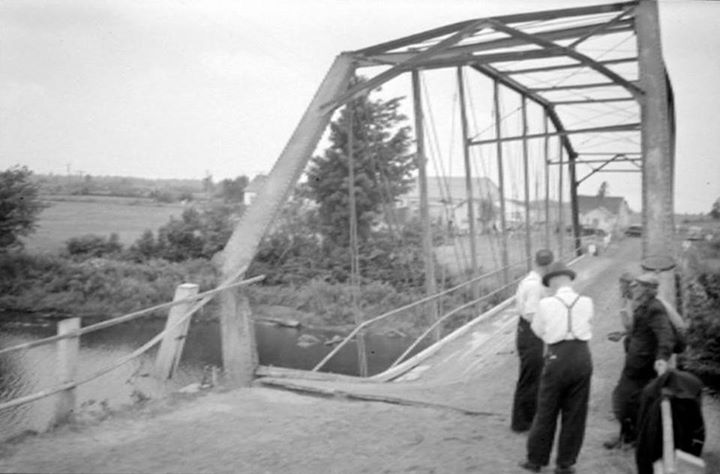
Bridge at Saint-Étienne, 1947.

== Toponymy ==
The name of the river and its use merge with that of the seigneury of Saint-Gilles or of Beaurivage granted in 1738 to Gilles Rageot, sieur de Beaurivage. Several parishes and municipalities have retained, officially or in custom, the name of the river in their designation: Saint-Séverin, Saint-Gilles-de-Beaurivage, Saint-Patrice-de-Beaurivage, Saint-Narcisse-de-Beaurivage, Saint-Sylvestre-de-Beaurivage.

The toponym Rivière Beaurivage was formalized on December 5, 1968, at the Commission de toponymie du Québec.

== See also ==
- List of rivers of Quebec
