= Saint-Maxime =

Saint-Maxime may refer to:

- Sainte-Maxime, a commune in the Var department of the Provence-Alpes-Côte d'Azur region in Southeastern France.
- Saint-Maxime, Quebec, former village in Quebec, Canada
- Saint-Maxime-du-Mont-Louis, Quebec, a municipality in Quebec, Canada
