= Guylaine Dumont =

Canadian female beach volleyball player

Guylaine Dumont (born October 9, 1967 in Saint-Étienne-de-Lauzon, Quebec) is a Canadian female beach volleyball player. She lives in Saint-Antoine-de-Tilly.

Together with partner Annie Martin, Guylaine Dumont recorded the best ever Olympic result for Canadian women in beach volleyball with a fifth-place finish at the 2004 Olympic Games in Athens, losing to the Americans Misty May and Kerry Walsh in the quarter-final.

Regarded as one of the top Canadian women’s volleyball players of all-time, Dumont began her career as a member of the Canadian national team in 1985 at just 17 years of age.

From 1990 to 1997, Dumont competed overseas and played professionally in both Italy and Japan.

After playing two seasons of beach volleyball in 1997 and 1998, Dumont retired from competitive volleyball only to make a return to the sport three years later at the 2001 Francophone Games where she won a gold medal.

In 2002, Dumont returned to the sport full-time and began competing alongside Martin in the beach volleyball discipline. She retired from competitive volleyball for a second time following the 2004 Olympic Games.

Dumont is married to 1988 Canadian long track speed skating Olympian, Gregor Jelonek and now, he is the coach of the Canadian long track speed skating team. He was in Torino, Vancouver, Sotchi and PyeongChang as a coach in 2006–2010-2014 and 2018.

Gabrielle Jelonek, her daughter is a speed skater. Now on the canadian Next Gen team. She represented her country at two junior World Championship 1) in Salt Lake city in 2018 and 2) in Pine, Italy in 2019.

Dumont, was part of the creation of Sport'Aide in 2015.

Since 2018, she is an ambassador for good sportsmanship for the Québec government. She promotes Sport'Aide and the values of the sportsmanship like respect, integrity and perseverance.

Dumont is currently a helping relationship therapist specialized in sport and a motivational speaker.

Dumont ran for the New Democratic Party in the riding of Lévis—Lotbinière in the 2021 Canadian federal election.
