= Saint-Lambert-de-Lauzon =

- Municipality
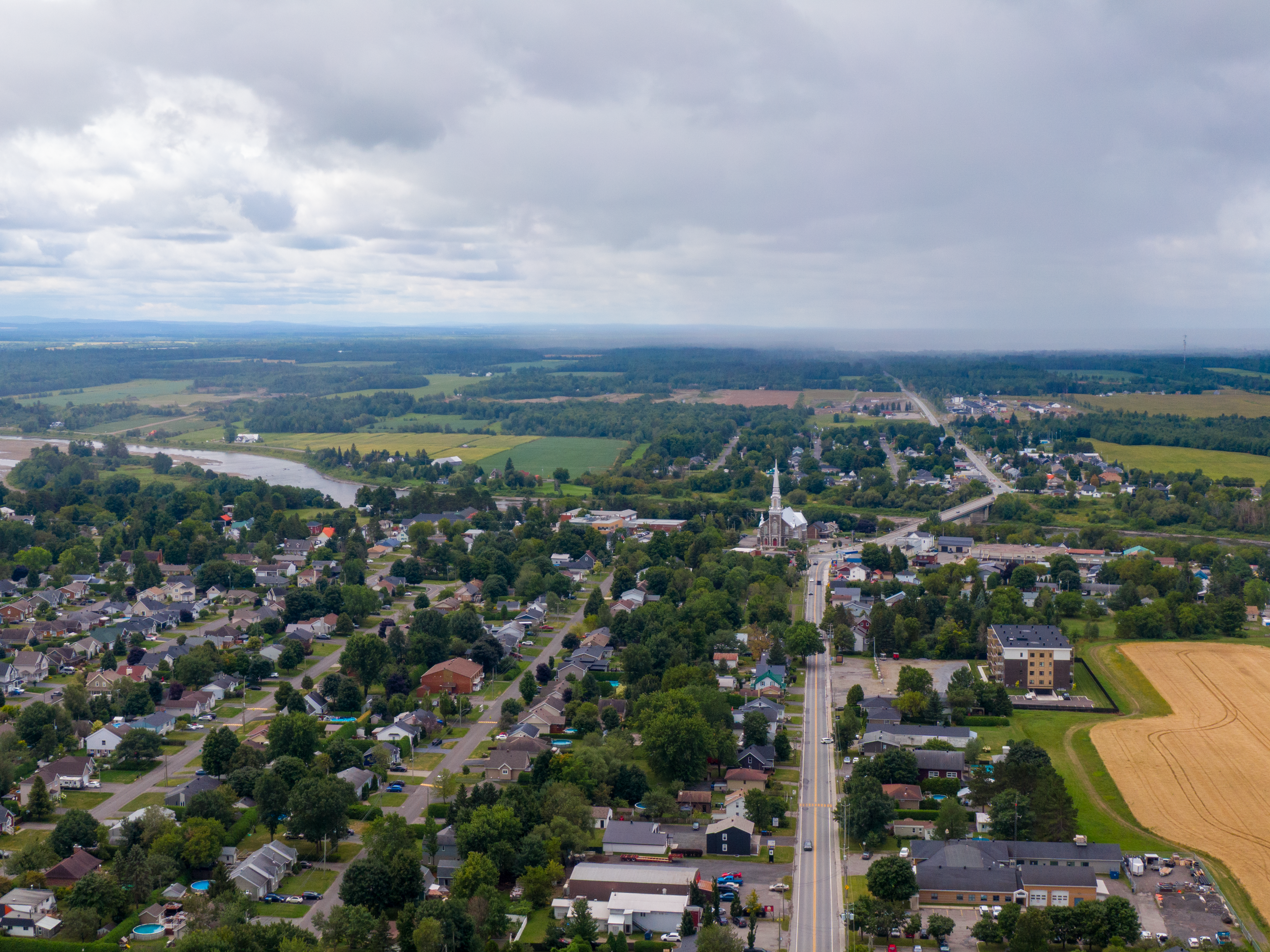
- Saint-Lambert-de-Lauzon in 2025

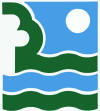
- Seal

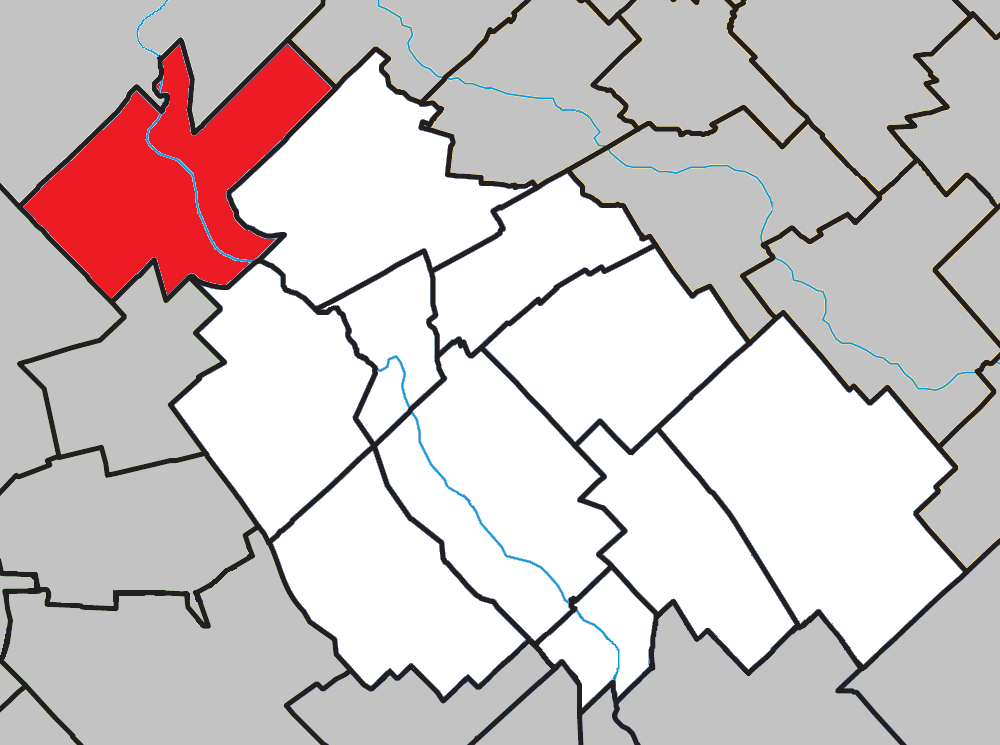
- Location within La Nouvelle-Beauce RCM

- Location in southern Quebec
- Coordinates: 46°35′N 71°12′W
- Country: Canada
- Province: Quebec
- Region: Chaudière-Appalaches
- RCM: La Nouvelle-Beauce
- Constituted: July 1, 1855

Government
  - Mayor: Olivier Dumais
  - Federal riding: Lévis—Lotbinière
  - Prov. riding: Beauce-Nord

Area
  - Municipality: 109.50 km^{2} (42.28 sq mi)
  - Land: 106.76 km^{2} (41.22 sq mi)
  - Urban: 5.34 km^{2} (2.06 sq mi)

Population (2021)
  - Municipality: 6,817
  - Density: 63.9/km^{2} (166/sq mi)
  - Urban: 3,790
  - Urban density: 709.7/km^{2} (1,838/sq mi)
  - Pop 2016-2021: ▲2.6%
  - Dwellings: 2,752
- Time zone: UTC−5 (EST)
  - Summer (DST): UTC−4 (EDT)
- Postal code(s): G0S 2W0
- Area codes: 418 and 581
- Highways A-73: R-171; R-175; R-218
- Website: www.mun-sldl.ca

Saint-Lambert-de-Lauzon (French pronunciation: [sɛ̃ lɑ̃bɛʁ də lozɔ̃]) is a municipality in La Nouvelle-Beauce Regional County Municipality in Quebec, Canada. It is part of the Chaudière-Appalaches region and the population is 6,177 as of the Canada 2011 Census. Prior to June 22, 2013 it was a parish municipality.

It is named after Pierre Lambert, a land surveyor who planned neighbouring Lévis. Lauzon refers to the seigneurie of Lauzon, the first to be established on the south shore of the Saint Lawrence River in 1636.

== History ==
The parish municipality of Saint-Lambert-de-Lauzon was established July 1, 1855, from the disbanded county of Dorchester. The post office created the same year, under the name of Saint-Lambert, will see itself adding in 1876 the locator element " de-Lévis", evoking the census division that covered the municipality. The Lambertins, whose ancestors came from neighboring parishes, owe their kindness to Pierre Lambert, surveyor, who in 1849 drew up the plans for the town of Aubigny, later known as Lévis. As for the specific "de-Lauzon", it emphasizes that the place was part of the seigneury of Lauzon, granted in 1636 to Simon Le Maître, merchant in Rouen and nominee of Jean de Lauson. In addition, one notes on a plan of the seigniory of Lauzon, drawn up by the same Pierre Lambert in 1828, the form “St-Lambert” indicated along a path (road) skirting the Chaudière river.

Over the years, Saint-Lambert-de-Lauzon has developed on either side of the Chaudière River, which crosses its territory over its entire length and gives its urban core an enchanting setting. A bridge, inaugurated in 1960, links the two shores. A first bridge, called the Taschereau bridge, was built in 1912. Previously, crossing the river was done using a Bac, hence the name of its primary school, École du Bac.

In 1874, one part of the town was taken way to form the new town of Saint-Narcisse-de-Beaurivage (the new town also included parts of Saint-Gilles, Saint-Patrice-de-Beaurivage and Saint-Bernard). In 2013 the parish of Saint-Lambert-de-Lauzon became a municipality.

== Demographics ==
Historical population
Year	Pop.	±%
1861	1,646	—
1871	1,563	−5.0%
1881	1,516	−3.0%
1891	1,433	−5.5%
1901	1,280	−10.7%
1911	1,308	+2.2%
1921	1,189	−9.1%
1931	1,188	−0.1%
1941	1,202	+1.2%
1951	1,233	+2.6%
1956	1,317	+6.8%
1961	1,444	+9.6%
1966	1,591	+10.2%
1971	1,719	+8.0%
1976	2,257	+31.3%
1981	3,202	+41.9%
1986	3,611	+12.8%
1991	4,146	+14.8%
1996	4,590	+10.7%
2001	4,857	+5.8%
2006	5,401	+11.2%
2011	6,177	+14.4%
2016	6,647	+7.6%
2021	6,817	+2.6%

Private dwellings occupied by usual residents: 2671 (total dwellings: 2752)

Mother tongue:

- English as first language: 1%
- French as first language: 97.5%
- English and French as first language: 0.7%
- Other as first language: 0.7%

== Attractions ==
Located on rue du Pont, west of the Chaudière River, the leisure center and the adjacent Alexis-Blanchet Park are places where several sporting and social activities can be practiced.

Facilities:

- Baseball field
- Two soccer fields that can be modified into four small fields
- Basketball court
- Volleyball court
- Two ice rinks
- Pétanque
- Skatepark
- Playground

== Government ==
List of former mayors:

- R. Vallière (1868-1869)
- Régis Dion (1869-1873)
- Chrysologue Roy (1873-1875)
- Xavier Dussault (1875-1876)
- Nicolas Roy (1876-1877)
- Étienne Roy (1877-1878)
- Nicolas Roy (1878-1879)
- Raymond Vallières (1879-1881)
- Xavier Gagné (1881-1884)
- Alexis Gagné (1884-1885)
- Jean Lemieux (1885-1886)
- Raymond Goulet (1886-1888)
- Athanase Coulombe (1888-1889)
- Raymond Goulet (1889-1891)
- Théophile Vermette (1891-1894)
- Edmond Rouleau (1894-1895)
- Éphrem Bernier (1895-1896)
- Louis Nadeau (1896-1898)
- Frédéric Morin (1898-1904)
- Napoléon Gourde (1904-1908)
- Léon Roy (1911-1913)
- Louis Gosselin (1913-1917)
- Pierre Breton (1917-1923)
- J.A. Lemieux (1923-1925)
- Laurent Lemieux (1925-1929)
- J.E. Carrier (1929-1935)
- Jos Fontaine (1935-1939)
- Louis Napoléon Couture (1939-1941)
- Damase Breton (1941-1961)
- Lucien Gobeil (1961-1967)
- Marcel Dumont (1967-1969)
- Alexis Blanchet (1969-1978)
- Fernand Boutin (1978-1981)
- Jean-Paul Bédard (1981-1985)
- Joseph Stella (1985–1989)
- Jean-Guy Vachon (1989–2001)
- Jacques Pelletier (2001–2005)
- François Barret (2005–2017)
- Olivier Dumais (2017–present)

== Education ==
Centre de services scolaire des Navigateurs operates Francophone public schools:

- École du Bac
- École secondaire les Etchemins in Lévis

Central Quebec School Board operates Anglophone public schools:

- St. Vincent School in Quebec City
- Ste-Foy Elementary School in Quebec City
- Quebec High School in Quebec City
