= Alliance of the North =

Alliance of the North Alliance du Nord
- Party Leader: François Bélanger
- Founded: September 11, 2013 September 28, 2015 (registered)
- Dissolved: September 15, 2019
- Headquarters: Tracadie–Sheila, New Brunswick
- Ideology: Conservatism; Social conservatism Right-wing populism
- Political position: Right-wing

Website
- www.alliancedunord.ca

The Alliance of the North (French: Alliance du Nord) was a Canadian social conservative and right-wing populist political party, originating from the province of Quebec. In the 2015 federal election, the party nominated its leader François Bélanger in Lévis—Lotbinière. Bélanger did not win a seat. The party was deregistered by Elections Canada on September 15, 2019.

== Ideology ==
On its website, the party created a list of six (6) priorities, developed in September 2013, which form the foundation of its ideology. Among the priorities include reducing the size of the federal government, reducing the number of immigrants accepted into Canada to 150,000 per year, promoting a right to bear arms, launching a federal investigation into "criminal bankers", and "removing" the Canadian Charter of Rights and Freedoms.

== Election results ==
The party leader François Bélanger ran as the party's only candidate in the 2015 federal election in the Quebec riding of Lévis—Lotbinière. He received 136 votes or 0.22% of the vote (0.001% of votes cast in Canada), placing last among the six candidates to contest the riding.

== Electoral performance ==
Election	Leader	Votes	%	Seats	+/–	Position	Government
2015	François Bélanger	136	0.00	0 / 308	-	-	extra-parliamentary
