= Quebec Route 171 =

Highway in Quebec, Canada

Route 171

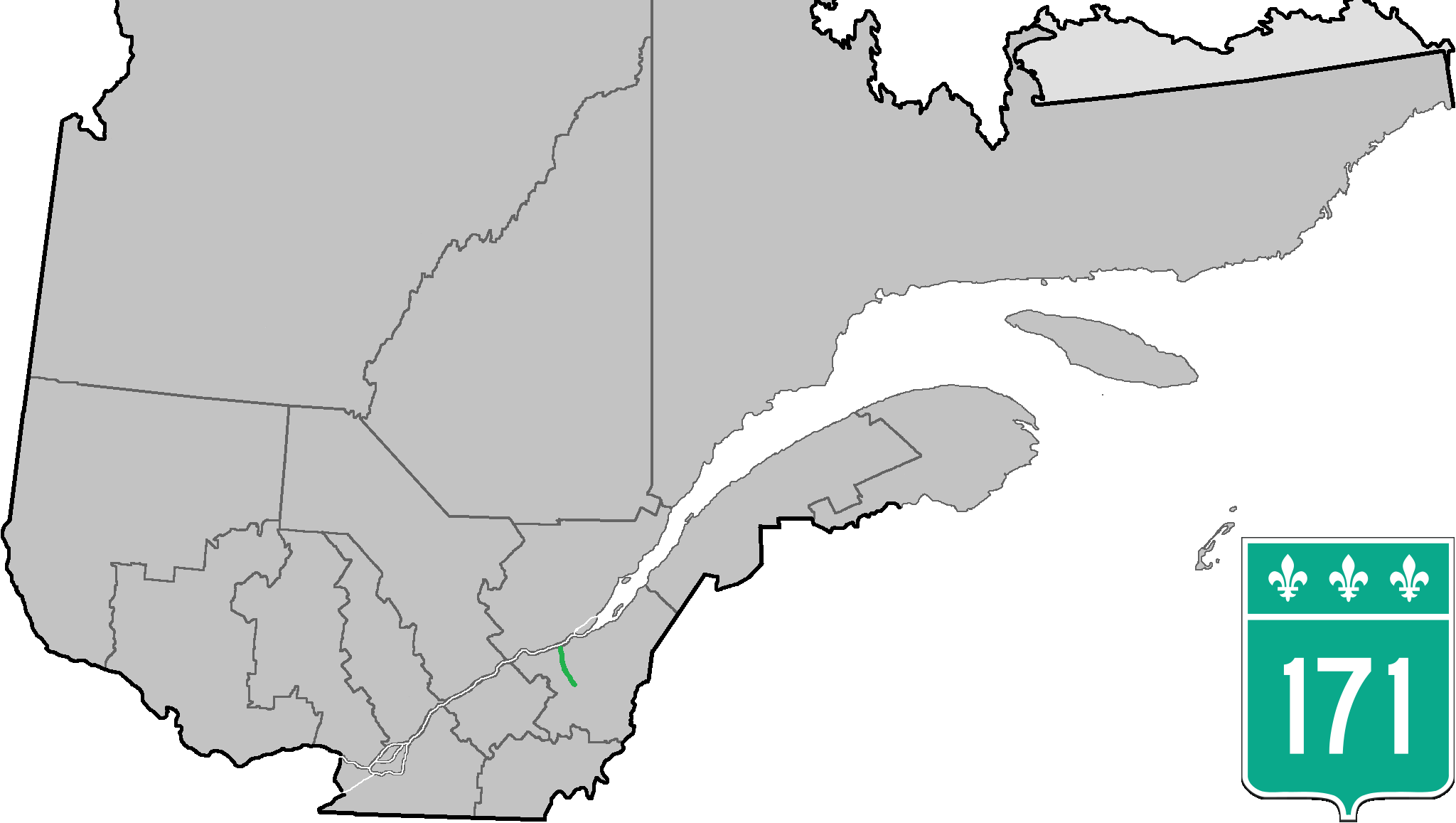

Route information
- Maintained by Transports Québec
- Length: 40.0 km (24.9 mi)
- History: Route 1

Major junctions
- South end: R-173 in Scott
- R-116 in Lévis; A-20 (TCH) in Lévis
- North end: R-132 in Lévis

Location
- Country: Canada
- Province: Quebec
- Major cities: Lévis, Saint-Lambert-de-Lauzon, Scott

Highway system
- Quebec provincial highways; Autoroutes; List; Former
← R-170	→ R-172

Route 171 is a north/south highway on the south shore of the St. Lawrence River in Quebec, Canada. Its southern terminus is in Scott at the junction of Route 173 and its northern terminus is in Lévis at the junction of Route 132. Route 171 follows the Chaudière River for most of its course, from the former town of Saint-Étienne-de-Lauzon up to Scott.

Since it parallels Autoroute 73, and as it is located on the western side of the Chaudiere (whereas most town centres are located on the eastern side), Route 171 is far from being a busy highway.

== Municipalities along Route 171 ==
- Scott
- Saint-Bernard
- Saint-Lambert-de-Lauzon
- Lévis

== Major intersections ==
RCM	Location	km	mi	Destinations	Notes
La Nouvelle-Beauce	Scott	0.0	0.0	R-173 (Route du Président-Kennedy) to A-73 – Lévis, Sainte-Marie	R-171 southern terminus
La Nouvelle-Beauce	Saint-Lambert-de-Lauzon	16.8	10.4	R-218 to A-73 – Saint-Gilles, Saint-Henri-de-Lévis	
Lévis		30.8	19.1	R-116 east (Route des Rivières) – Québec	South end of R-116 concurrency
Lévis		31.5	19.6	R-116 west (Route des Rivières) – Saint-Gilles, Thetford Mines	North end of R-116 concurrency
Lévis		35.7	22.2	A-20 (TCH) – Montréal, Québec	A-20 exit 305
Lévis		40.0	24.9	R-132 (Route Marie-Victorin) – Sainte-Croix, Québec	R-171 northern terminus
1.000 mi = 1.609 km; 1.000 km = 0.621 mi: Concurrency terminus

== See also ==
- List of Quebec provincial highways
