= Rivière aux Ormes =

Rivière aux Ormes may refer to:

- Rivière aux Ormes (Petite rivière du Chêne), Quebec, Canada
- Rivière aux Ormes (Huron River tributary), Quebec, Canada
