= Saint-Apollinaire, Quebec =

Saint-Apollinaire
- Municipality
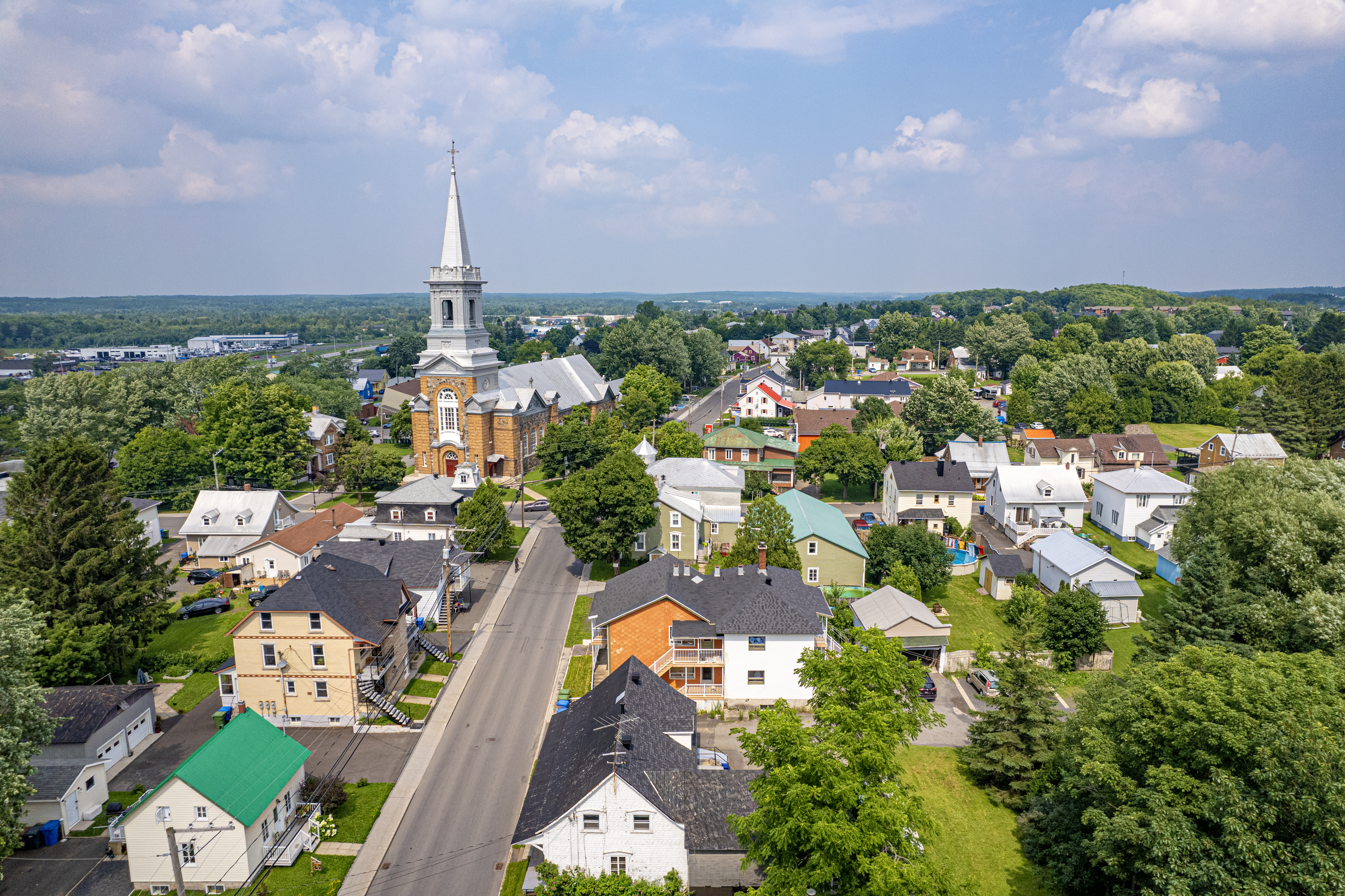
- Aerial view of Saint-Apollinaire

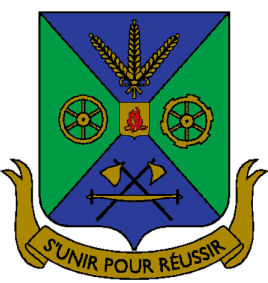
- Seal Coat of arms

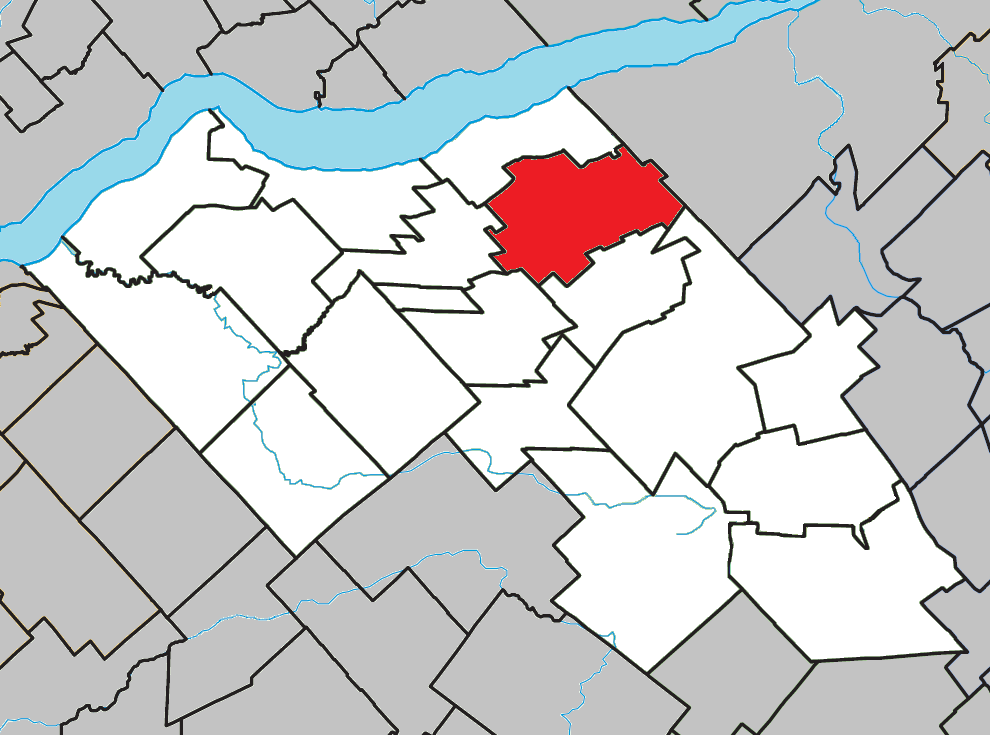
- Location within Lotbinière RCM

- Location in southern Quebec
- Coordinates: 46°37′N 71°31′W
- Country: Canada
- Province: Quebec
- Region: Chaudière-Appalaches
- RCM: Lotbinière
- Constituted: April 6, 1974

Government
  - Mayor: Jonathan Moreau
  - Federal riding: Lévis—Lotbinière
  - Prov. riding: Lotbinière-Frontenac

Area
  - Municipality: 98.17 km^{2} (37.90 sq mi)
  - Land: 96.83 km^{2} (37.39 sq mi)
  - Urban: 4.43 km^{2} (1.71 sq mi)

Population (2021)
  - Municipality: 7,968
  - Density: 82.3/km^{2} (213/sq mi)
  - Urban: 4,933
  - Urban density: 1,113.1/km^{2} (2,883/sq mi)
  - Pop 2016-2021: ▲30.4%
  - Dwellings: 3,449
- Time zone: UTC−5 (EST)
  - Summer (DST): UTC−4 (EDT)
- Postal code(s): G0S 2E0
- Area codes: 418 and 581
- Highways A-20 (TCH): R-273
- Website: st-apollinaire.com

Saint-Apollinaire (French pronunciation: [sɛ̃t‿apɔlinɛʁ]) is a municipality in the Lotbinière Regional County Municipality in Quebec, Canada. It is part of the Chaudière-Appalaches region and had a population is 7,968 as of 2021. It is named after Saint Apollinaris (French: Saint Apollinaire).

== History ==
In 1738, Angélique le Gardeur, the daughter of the seigneur of Tilly, became a widow and was granted a seigneury, which she called Seigniory of Gaspé, after her late husband. It was located south of the Seigneury of Tilly and included what is now Saint-Apollinaire. In 1806, a road crossing the territory of the Seigneury of Gaspé was opened between Saint-Nicolas (now in Lévis) and Saint-Gilles and allowed the development of the Lotbinière County.

The municipality was canonically imposed on November 23, 1853. On July 1, 1855, the parish municipality of Saint-Apollinaire was officially founded. The territory then grew rapidly. Then followed the construction of the first school, the arrival of the railway, and the installation of the first telegraph line. The telephone arrived in 1905. Saint-Apollinaire lost parts of its territory on two separate occasions: in 1867, during the creation of Saint-Agapit-de-Beaurivage (founded from a section of Saint-Gilles also), and in 1919, during the creation of Francoeur.

In the 1960s, the Trans-Canada Highway, which runs from Western to Eastern Canada, was built and passed through the municipality. The busy road caused several businesses to be built near it in Saint-Apollinaire. These business gave a greater appeal for settling in Saint-Apollinaire. The current Municipality of Saint-Apollinaire was finally formed on April 6, 1974, when the village of Francoeur and the parish municipality of Saint-Apollinaire merged to form the new municipality of Saint-Apollinaire.

In 2017, a project for a Muslim cemetery was rejected by the citizens. Th project received media attention, and its refusal created a negative image of the municipality. Also, the Martin Carpentier Affair happened in Saint-Apollinaire.

== Geography ==
Saint-Apollinaire is located on the south shore of the St. Lawrence River. The municipality covers an area of 97 km2. The territory of the municipality is crossed by Autoroute 20 from east to west and by Route 273 from north to south.

The municipality is surrounded by six municipalities. It is located at the limits of the Lotbinière RCM, bordering Lévis to the east. The other municipalities around Saint-Apollinaire are also part of the Lotbinière RCM: to the north, there is Saint-Antoine-de-Tilly; to the west, there is Notre-Dame-du-Sacré-Cœur-d'Issoudun; to the southwest, there is Saint-Flavien; to the south, there is Saint-Agapit and, to the southeast, there is Saint-Gilles. The municipality is located about 20 km from the bridges of Quebec City. The municipality is located 10 minutes by car from Quebec City and Lévis via Autoroute 20. Another nearby town is Sainte-Marie, located 40 minutes away by car.

== Demographics ==
Historical Census Data – Saint-Apollinaire, Quebec
Year	Pop.	±%
1976	2,369	—
1981	2,796	+18.0%
1986	3,090	+10.5%
1991	3,608	+16.8%
1996	3,716	+3.0%
2001	3,930	+5.8%
2006	4,425	+12.6%
2011	5,102	+15.3%
2016	6,110	+19.8%
2021	7,968	+30.4%
Source: Statistics Canada

In the 2021 Census of Population conducted by Statistics Canada, Saint-Apollinaire had a population of 7,968 living in 3,307 of its 3,449 total private dwellings, a change of 30.4% from its 2016 population of 6,110. With a land area of 96.83 km^{2} (37.39 sq mi), it had a population density of 82.3/km^{2} (213.1/sq mi) in 2021.
