= Scott, Quebec =

Scott
- Municipality
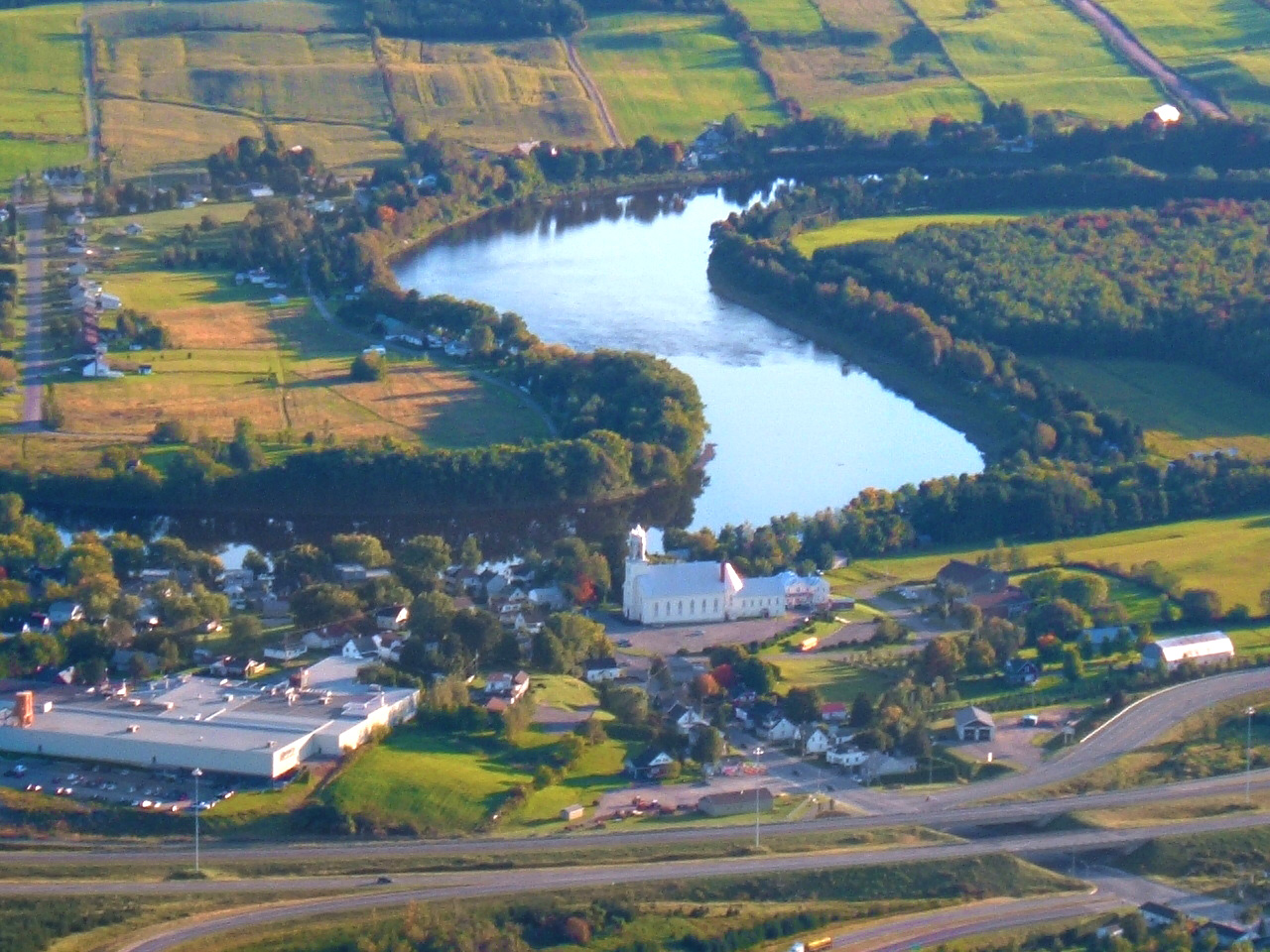

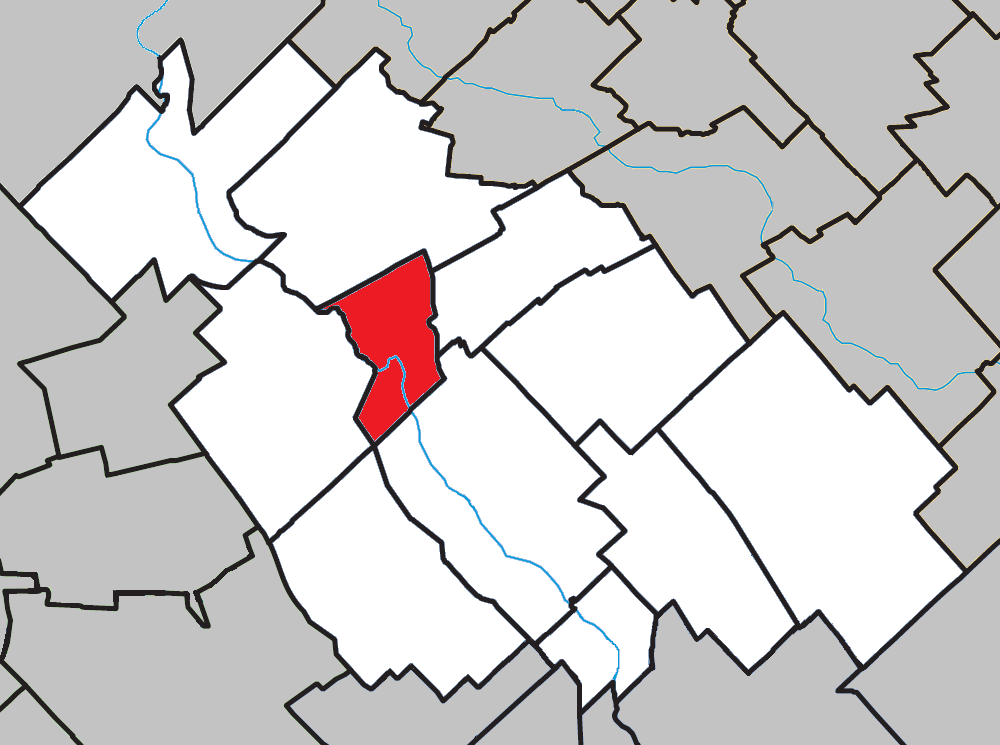
- Location within La Nouvelle-Beauce RCM

- Location in southern Quebec
- Coordinates: 46°30′N 71°04′W
- Country: Canada
- Province: Quebec
- Region: Chaudière-Appalaches
- RCM: La Nouvelle-Beauce
- Constituted: March 29, 1995

Government
  - Mayor: Frédéric Vallières
  - Federal riding: Beauce
  - Prov. riding: Beauce-Nord

Area
  - Total: 32.10 km^{2} (12.39 sq mi)
  - Land: 31.29 km^{2} (12.08 sq mi)

Population (2021)
  - Total: 2,566
  - Density: 82/km^{2} (210/sq mi)
  - Pop 2016-2021: ▲9.1%
  - Dwellings: 1,101
- Time zone: UTC−5 (EST)
  - Summer (DST): UTC−4 (EDT)
- Postal code(s): G0S 3G0
- Area codes: 418 and 581
- Highways A-73: R-171; R-173
- Website: www.municipalitescott.com

Scott is a municipality in La Nouvelle-Beauce Regional County Municipality, in Quebec, Canada. It is part of the Chaudière-Appalaches region and had a population is 2,566 as of 2021.

== History ==
The origin of the Municipality of Scott dates back to 1897 with the foundation of the parish municipality of Saint-Maxime. This municipality was formed from sections of the neighbouring municipalities of Saint-Bernard, Saint-Isidore-de-Lauzon and Sainte-Marie-de-la-Nouvelle-Beauce. In 1933, Saint-Maxime was split in two with the foundation of the municipality of Taschereau-Fortier around the more rural sections of the municipality while Saint-Maxime only kept the more urbanized village. In 1978, Saint-Maxime took the name of Scott and in 1995, Scott and Taschereau-Fortier reunited to form the current municipality of Scott.

=== Origin of the name ===
Scott can be known under several names, due to a history of name changes, place names, territory breakups, and amalgamations.

- Taschereau-Fortier, religious parish (1824), then territory detached from the parish municipality of Saint-Maxime (1933); it formed the rural part of Scott's territory until 1995. It was named after Gabriel-Elzéar Taschereau and Richard-Achille Fortier, two seigneurs who have had property rights on the territory.
- Saint-Maxime, religious and civil parish (1895), changed name to Scott in 1978. Named after Reverend Maxime Fillion, first priest born on the territory.
- Saint-Maxime-de-Scott, never an official name of the municipality.
- Scott-Jonction, Lévis and Kennebec Railway (1875), then Quebec Central Railway station, located southeast of Saint-Maxime. It is named after Charles Armstrong Scott, who built the first section of the Lévis and Kennebec Railway. Although it was never an official name of the municipality, it has often been referred to as such.
- Scott, named after the train station. Official name of the urban part of the municipality since 1978 and the new territory constituted in 1995 following the amalgamation with Taschereau-Fortier.

== Geography ==
Scott is accessible via Autoroute 73 and is crossed by Route 173.
