= Saint-Narcisse-de-Beaurivage =

- Parish municipality
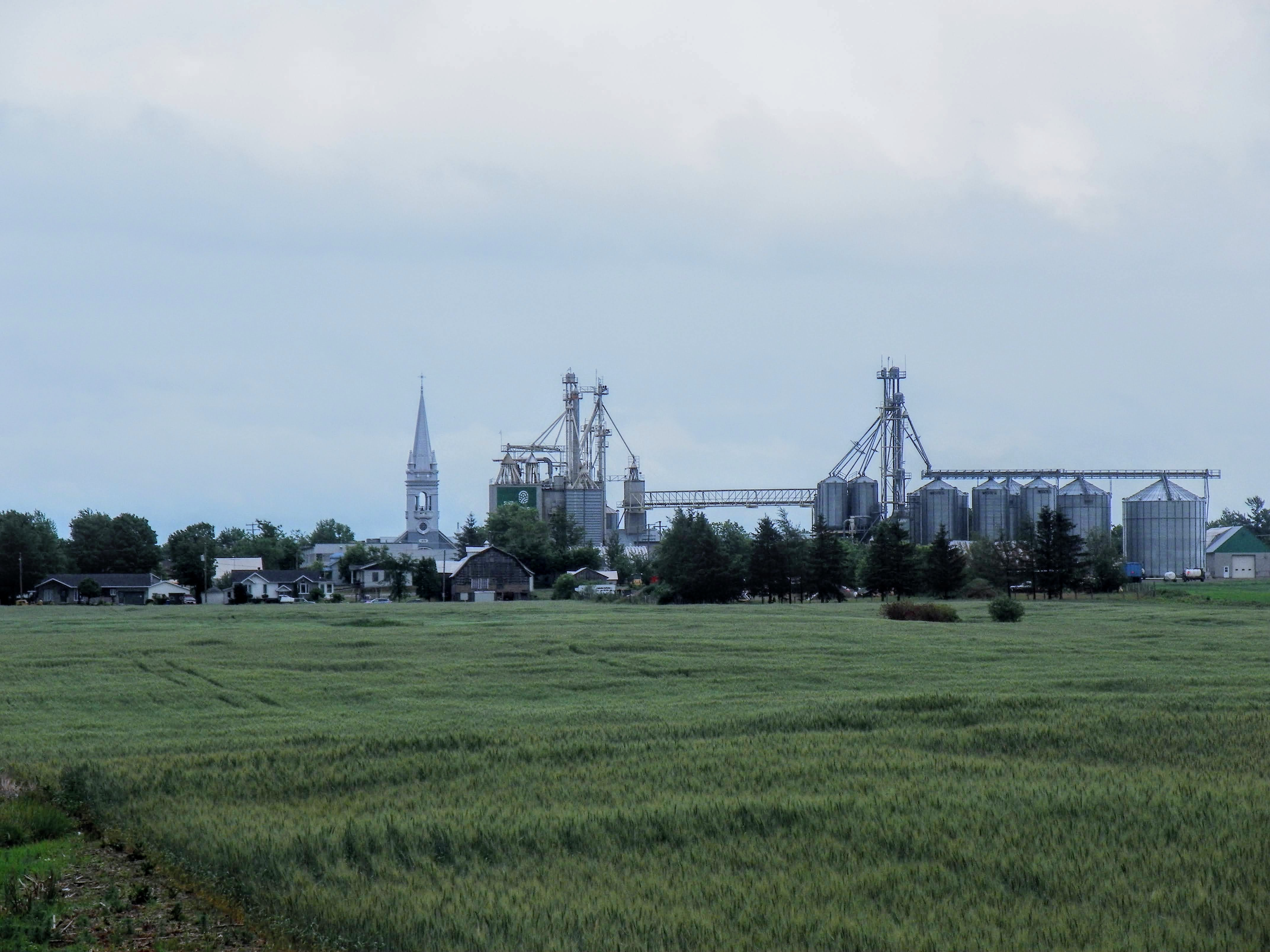
- View of the village.

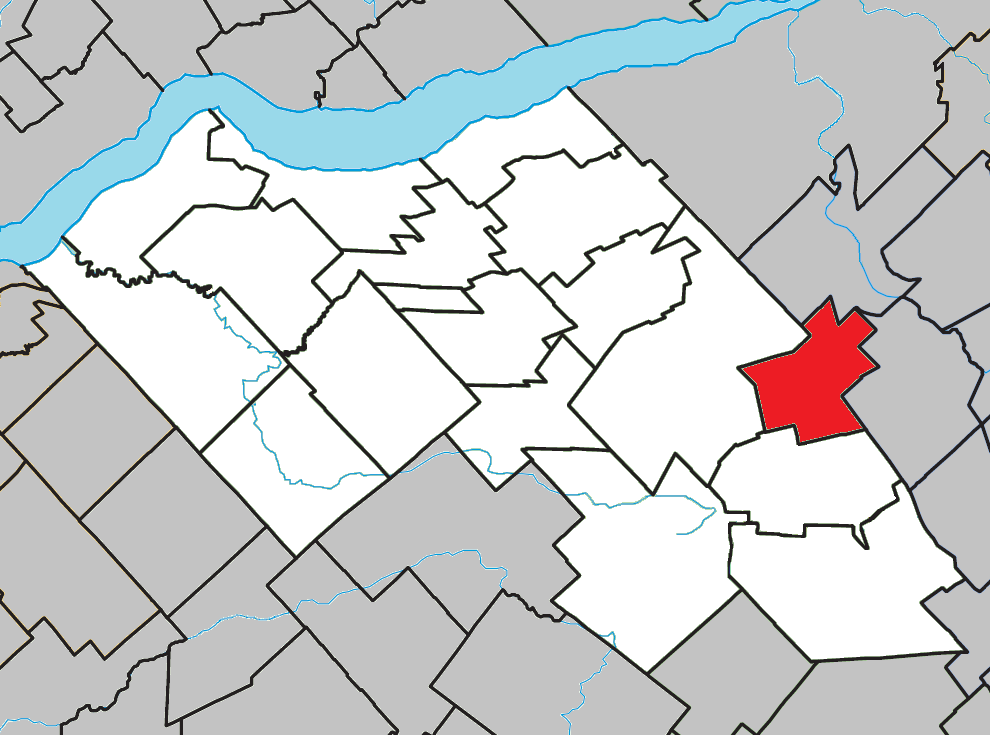
- Location within Lotbinière RCM.

- Location in southern Quebec.
- Coordinates: 46°29′N 71°14′W
- Country: Canada
- Province: Quebec
- Region: Chaudière-Appalaches
- RCM: Lotbinière
- Constituted: May 1, 1874

Government
  - Mayor: Manon Mercier
  - Federal riding: Lévis—Lotbinière
  - Prov. riding: Lotbinière-Frontenac

Area
  - Total: 60.95 km^{2} (23.53 sq mi)
  - Land: 62.07 km^{2} (23.97 sq mi)
- There is an apparent contradiction between two authoritative sources

Population (2021)
  - Total: 1,152
  - Density: 18.6/km^{2} (48/sq mi)
  - Pop 2016-2021: ▲4.2%
  - Dwellings: 466
- Time zone: UTC−5 (EST)
  - Summer (DST): UTC−4 (EDT)
- Postal code(s): G0S 1W0
- Area codes: 418 and 581
- Highways: No major routes
- Website: www.saintnarcisse debeaurivage.ca

Saint-Narcisse-de-Beaurivage (French pronunciation: [sɛ̃ naʁsis də boʁivaʒ]) is a parish municipality in the Lotbinière Regional County Municipality in the Chaudière-Appalaches region of Quebec, Canada. Its population is 1,152 as of the Canada 2021 Census. It was named after the Narcisse Dionne, an early benefactor of the parish. Beaurivage is associated to the seigneurie of Beaurivage, also known as Saint-Gilles.

The parish municipality, constituted in 1874, covers an area of 62km2, with a population density of 19.

== History ==
On August 26, 1972, five days after escaping from Saint-Vincent-de-Paul jail in Laval, Quebec, notorious French criminal Jacques Mesrine and his Quebec accomplice Jean-Paul Mercier robbed the Caisse populaire of Saint-Narcisse-de-Beaurivage. Ten minutes earlier, they had robbed the caisse of Saint-Bernard, for a total of $26,000 that day.

== Demographics ==
In the 2021 Census of Population conducted by Statistics Canada, Saint-Narcisse-de-Beaurivage had a population of 1,152 living in 446 of its 466 total private dwellings, a change of 4.2% from its 2016 population of 1,106. With a land area of 62.07 km^{2} (23.97 sq mi), it had a population density of 18.6/km^{2} (48.1/sq mi) in 2021.

Knowledge of official languages (2021)
Language	Population	Percentage (%)
English only	0	0.0%
French only	900	78.3%
English and French	245	21.3%
Neither English nor French	0	0.0%

Mother Tongue (2021)
Language	Population	Percentage (%)
English	5	0.4%
French	1,115	97.8%
Non-official language	30	2.6%
