= Saint-Agapit =

- Municipality
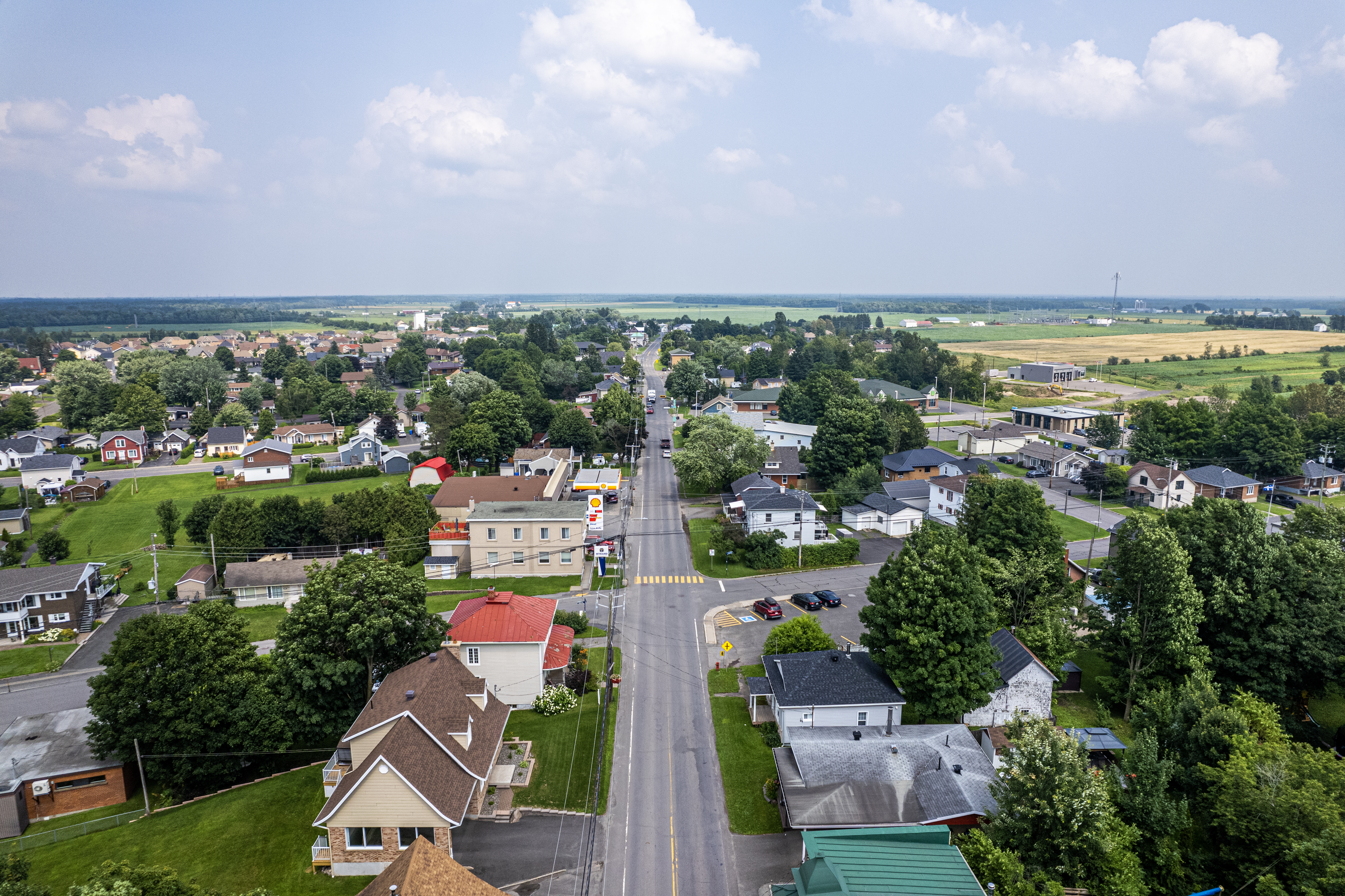
- Aerial view of Saint-Agapit

- Coat of arms
- Motto: Ad meliora semper (Always for the better)
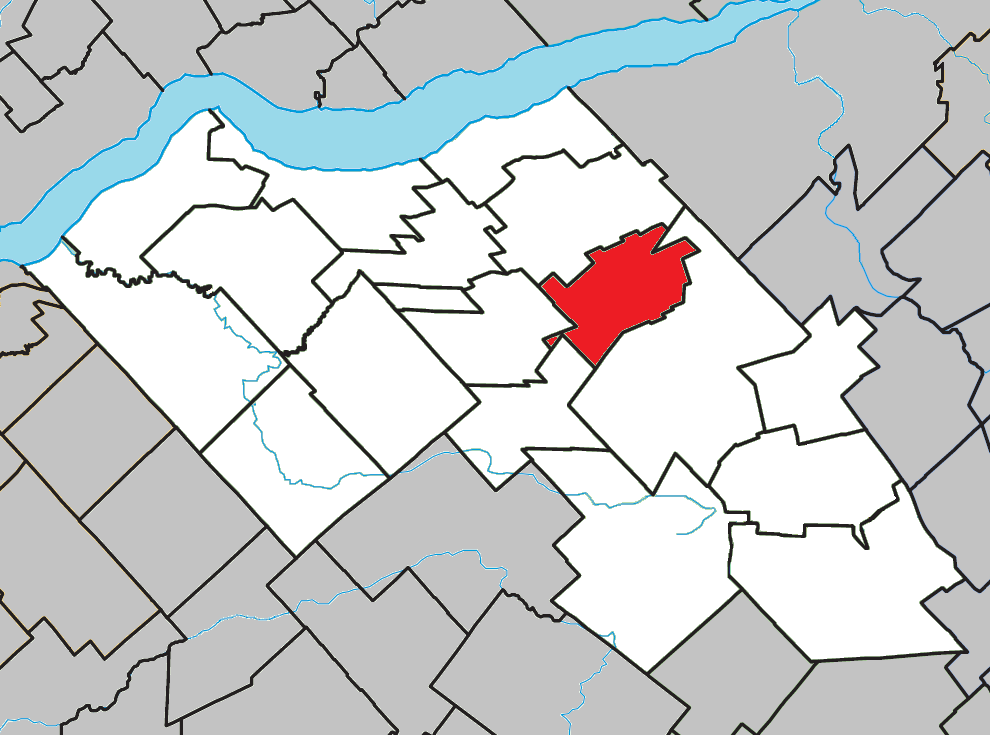
- Location within Lotbinière RCM.

- Location in southern Quebec.
- Coordinates: 46°34′N 71°26′W
- Country: Canada
- Province: Quebec
- Region: Chaudière-Appalaches
- RCM: Lotbinière
- Constituted: April 14, 1979
- Named for: Pope Agapetus I

Government
  - Mayor: Yves Gingras
  - Federal riding: Lévis—Lotbinière
  - Prov. riding: Lotbinière-Frontenac

Area
  - Municipality: 64.00 km^{2} (24.71 sq mi)
  - Land: 65.40 km^{2} (25.25 sq mi)
  - Urban: 2.26 km^{2} (0.87 sq mi)
- There is an apparent contradiction between two authoritative sources

Population (2021)
  - Municipality: 4,526
  - Density: 69.2/km^{2} (179/sq mi)
  - Urban: 3,168
  - Urban density: 1,404.1/km^{2} (3,637/sq mi)
  - Pop 2016-2021: ▲5.7%
  - Dwellings: 1,967
- Time zone: UTC−5 (EST)
  - Summer (DST): UTC−4 (EDT)
- Postal code(s): G0S 1Z0
- Area codes: 418 and 581
- Highways: R-116; R-273
- Website: www.st-agapit.qc.ca

Saint-Agapit (French pronunciation: [sɛ̃t‿aɡapi]) is a municipality in the Lotbinière Regional County Municipality, in Quebec, Canada. It is part of the Chaudière-Appalaches region and had a population is 4,526 as of 2021. It is named after Pope Agapetus I.

It is the hometown of retired National Hockey League forward Antoine Vermette, who brought the Stanley Cup to the town in July 2015 after he won it while playing for Chicago. Film director Richard Roy's childhood in Saint-Agapit was the inspiration for his autobiographical 2011 film, Frisson des Collines.

== History ==
The seigneury of Saint-Gilles, covering an area of two hundred and fifty square miles, was ceded on 1 April 1738 by the Intendant Gilles Hocquart to Gilles Rageot, Sieur de Beaurivage, a merchant from the Lower Town of Quebec City. Settlement of the first grant in the Rivière Noire area began around 1829. When the seigneurial system was abolished in 1854, the settlers became owners of a plot on condition that they cleared and cultivated it. As most settlers were unable to pay the price of their plot, the government imposed a municipal tax on them, which was paid to the seigneur. It was not until 1945 that the last vestiges of seigneurial rents disappeared.

The settlers of the area had to travel to Saint-Gilles church, sometime situated between five and nine miles away, in both winter and summer, to attend Mass and receive the sacraments. Around 1860, these settlers met Father Guillaume Dunn, then parish priest of Saint-Gilles, to set out their grievances and their plan: to build a chapel. He encouraged the building of the chapel, undertook to conduct services there as far as possible, and urged them to approach the bishop to request the establishment of a parish with a resident parish priest. Their efforts were rewarded when, on 18 February 1867, the Archbishop of Québec, Monsignor Charles-François Baillargeon, established a new parish named after Pope Agapetus I. The same year, the new municipality of Saint-Agapit-de-Beaurivage was officially created by merging the northern section of Saint-Gilles and the southern section of Saint-Apollinaire. On 4 October 1868, Saint-Agapit-de-Beaurivage welcomed its first resident parish priest, Father Joseph-Étienne Martin. In 1882 and 1883, despite a number of extensions to the chapel, it proved too small to meet the community’s needs. In 1885, an official request was sent to the archdiocese seeking permission to build a new church. Permission was granted, the building took shape and, in September, the foundation stone was blessed. The plans were drawn up by the architect David Ouellet and the building contract was awarded to Bertrand Charest, of Warwick, for $11,925. The old chapel and sacristy were sold on 4 July 1886.

On 10 May 1911, the municipality of Saint-Agapitville was established following its separation from the parish of Saint-Agapit-de-Beaurivage, before finally merging 68 years later, on 14 April 1979, under the new name of Saint-Agapit.

== Demographics ==
Population trend:

- Population in 2021: 4,526 (2016 to 2021 population change: 5.7%)
- Population in 2016: 4,280 (2011 to 2016 population change: 20.0%)
- Population in 2011: 3,567 (2006 to 2011 population change: 20.3%)
- Population in 2006: 2,965
- Population in 2001: 2,906
- Population in 1996: 2,913
- Population in 1991: 2,980
- Population in 1986: 2,943
- Population in 1981: 2,954

Private dwellings occupied by usual residents: 1,914 (total dwellings: 1,967)
