= Quebec Route 273 =

Highway in Quebec, Canada

Route 273

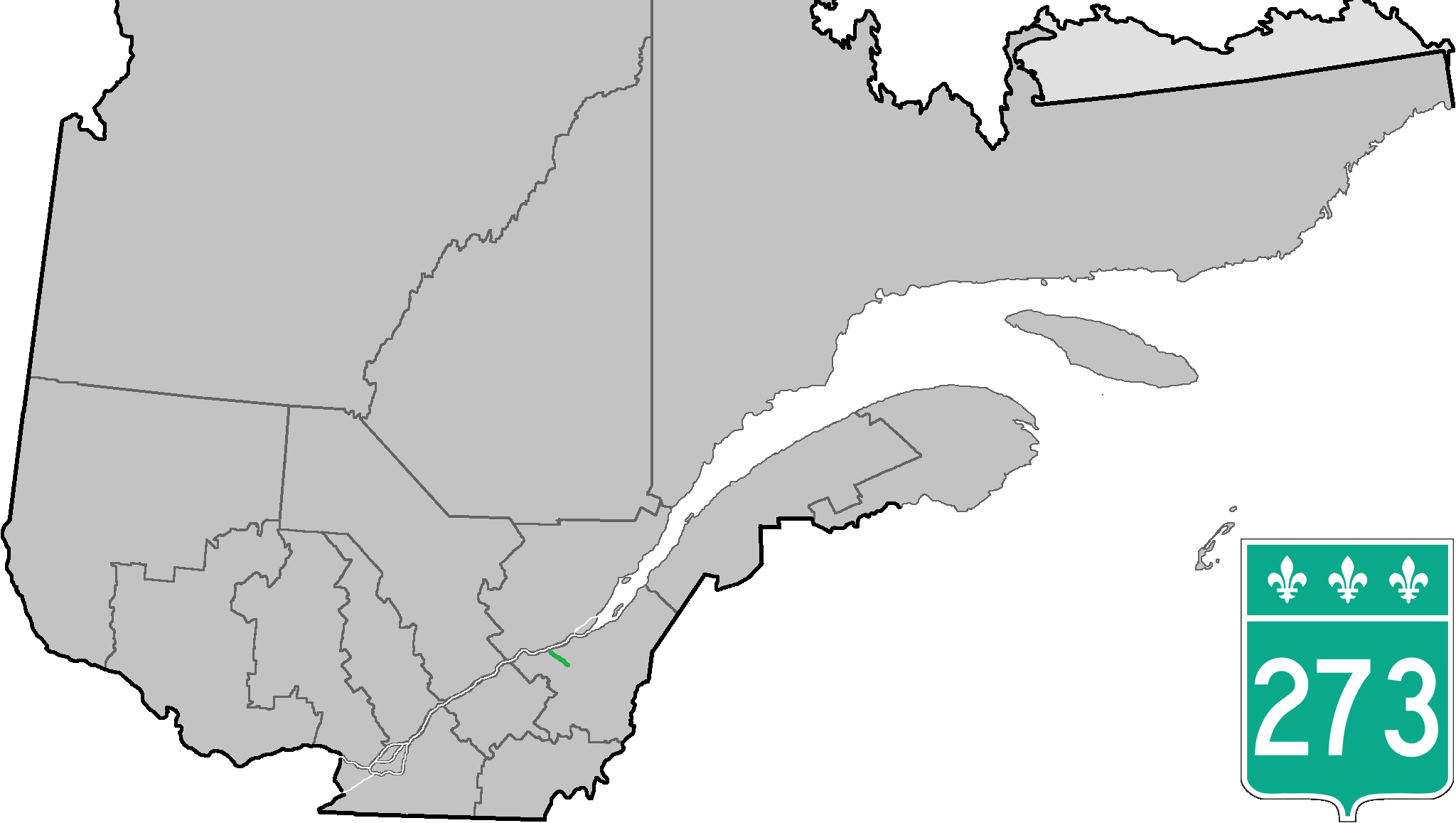

Route information
- Length: 21 km (13 mi)

Major junctions
- North end: R-132 in Saint-Antoine-de-Tilly
- A-20 (TCH) in Saint-Apollinaire; R-116 in Saint-Agapit
- South end: R-269 near Saint-Gilles

Location
- Country: Canada
- Province: Quebec
- Major cities: Saint-Apollinaire, Saint-Antoine-de-Tilly

Highway system
- Quebec provincial highways; Autoroutes; List; Former
← R-271	→ R-275

Route 273 is a short 21 km long, two-lane north–south highway on the south shore of the Saint Lawrence River in Quebec, Canada. Its northern terminus is in Saint-Antoine-de-Tilly at the junction of Route 132, and the southern terminus is at the junction of Route 269 near Saint-Gilles.

== Towns along Route 273 ==
- Saint-Antoine-de-Tilly
- Saint-Apollinaire
- Saint-Agapit

== See also ==
- List of Quebec provincial highways
