= Saint-Bernard, Quebec =

Saint-Bernard
- Municipality
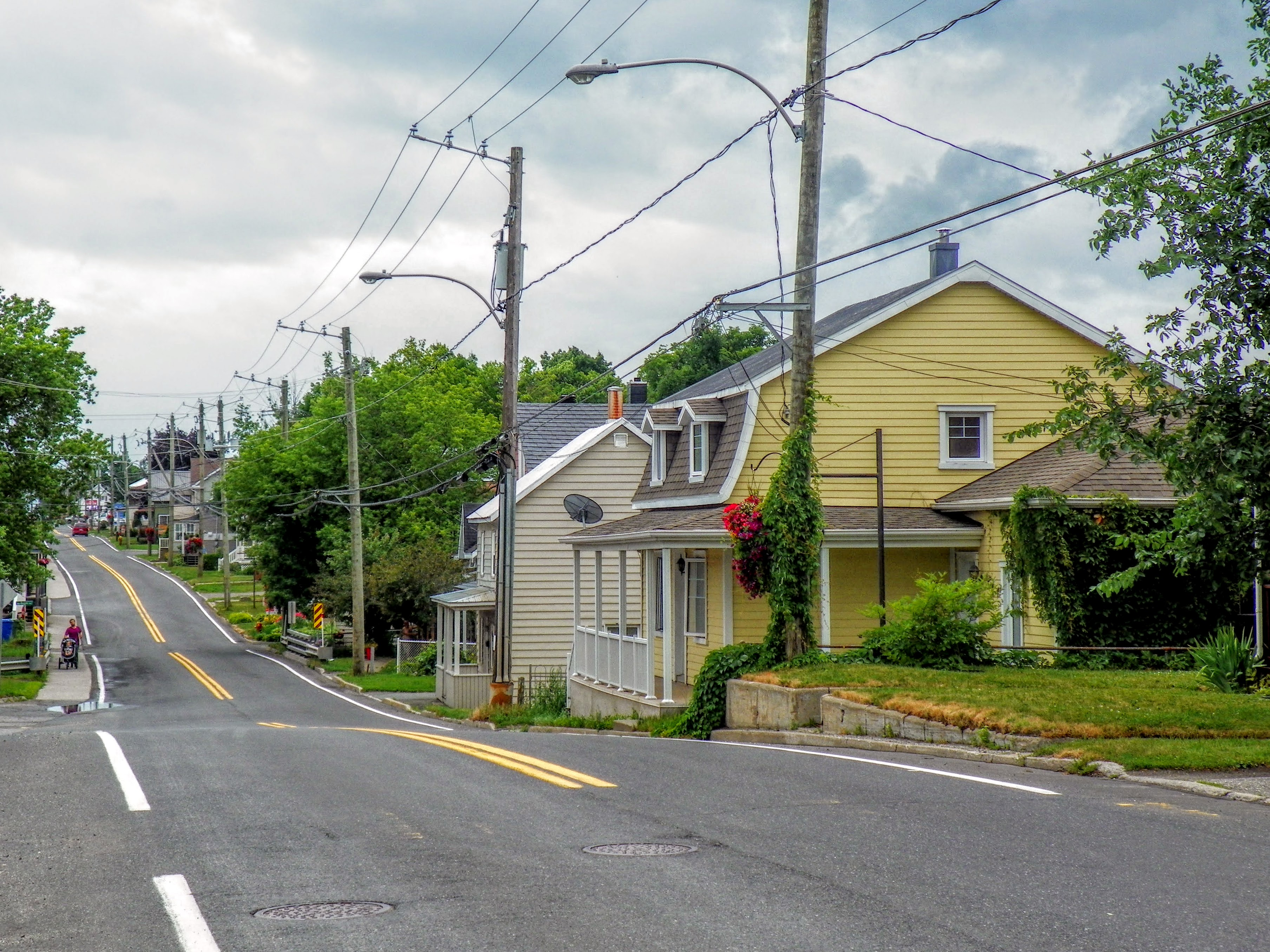
- Saint-Georges street, in the village.

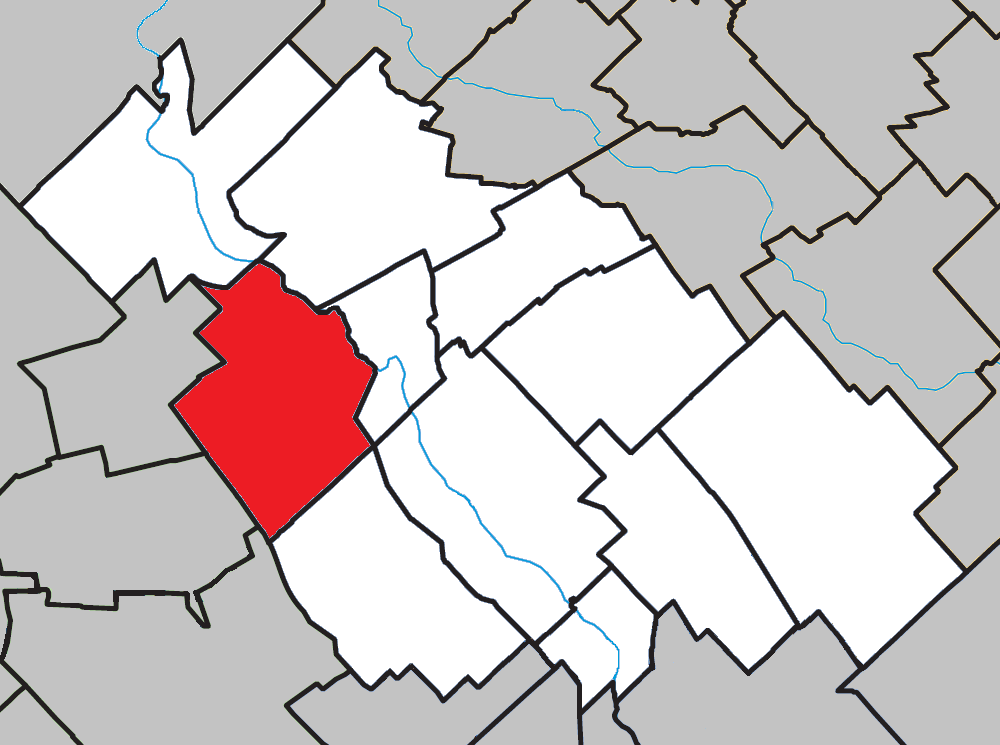
- Location within La Nouvelle-Beauce RCM.

- Location in southern Quebec.
- Coordinates: 46°30′N 71°08′W
- Country: Canada
- Province: Quebec
- Region: Chaudière-Appalaches
- RCM: La Nouvelle-Beauce
- Constituted: May 9, 1987

Government
  - Mayor: Francis Gagné
  - Federal riding: Beauce
  - Prov. riding: Beauce-Nord

Area
  - Municipality: 90.60 km^{2} (34.98 sq mi)
  - Land: 90.10 km^{2} (34.79 sq mi)
  - Urban: 0.88 km^{2} (0.34 sq mi)

Population (2021)
  - Municipality: 2,535
  - Density: 28.1/km^{2} (73/sq mi)
  - Urban: 1,223
  - Urban density: 1,394.8/km^{2} (3,613/sq mi)
  - Pop 2016-2021: ▲9.2%
  - Dwellings: 1,048
- Time zone: UTC−5 (EST)
  - Summer (DST): UTC−4 (EDT)
- Postal code(s): G0S 2G0
- Area codes: 418 and 581
- Highways: R-171
- Website: saint-bernard.quebec

Saint-Bernard (French pronunciation: [sɛ̃ bɛʁnaʁ]) is a municipality in La Nouvelle-Beauce Regional County Municipality, in Quebec, Canada. It is part of the Chaudière-Appalaches region and the population is 2,535 as of 2021. Constituted in 1845, it is named after Archbishop Bernard-Claude Panet.

The municipality is located on scenic Route 171 in Beauce.

On August 26, 1972, five days after escaping from Saint-Vincent-de-Paul jail in Laval, Quebec, notorious French criminal Jacques Mesrine and his Quebec accomplice Jean-Paul Mercier robbed the Caisse populaire of Saint-Bernard. Ten minutes later, they robbed the caisse of Saint-Narcisse-de-Beaurivage, for a total of $26,000 that day.

All of the victims of the 1997 Les Éboulements bus accident save one, the bus driver, were senior citizens from Saint-Bernard.

== Demographics ==
Population Population trend:

Census	Population	Change (%)
2021	2,535	▲9.2%
2016	2,321	▲14.8%
2011	2,021	▲5.3%
2006	1,920	▼5.3%
2001	2,028	▲0.2%
1996	2,023	▲0.4%
1991	2,014	N/A

Language Mother tongue language (2021)

Language	Population	Pct (%)
French only	2,425	97.4%
English only	5	0.2%
Both English and French	5	0.2%
Other languages	50	2.0%

== Attractions ==
The Church of Saint-Bernard, a listed historic monument, is a place of worship attended by many parishioners. The church choir is renowned for its performances of Christian hymns. The church also hosts various cultural events, such as Palm Sunday Weekend, Midnight Mass, Easter Mass and Judgement Sunday in March.
