= La Nouvelle-Beauce Regional County Municipality =

La Nouvelle-Beauce
- Regional county municipality
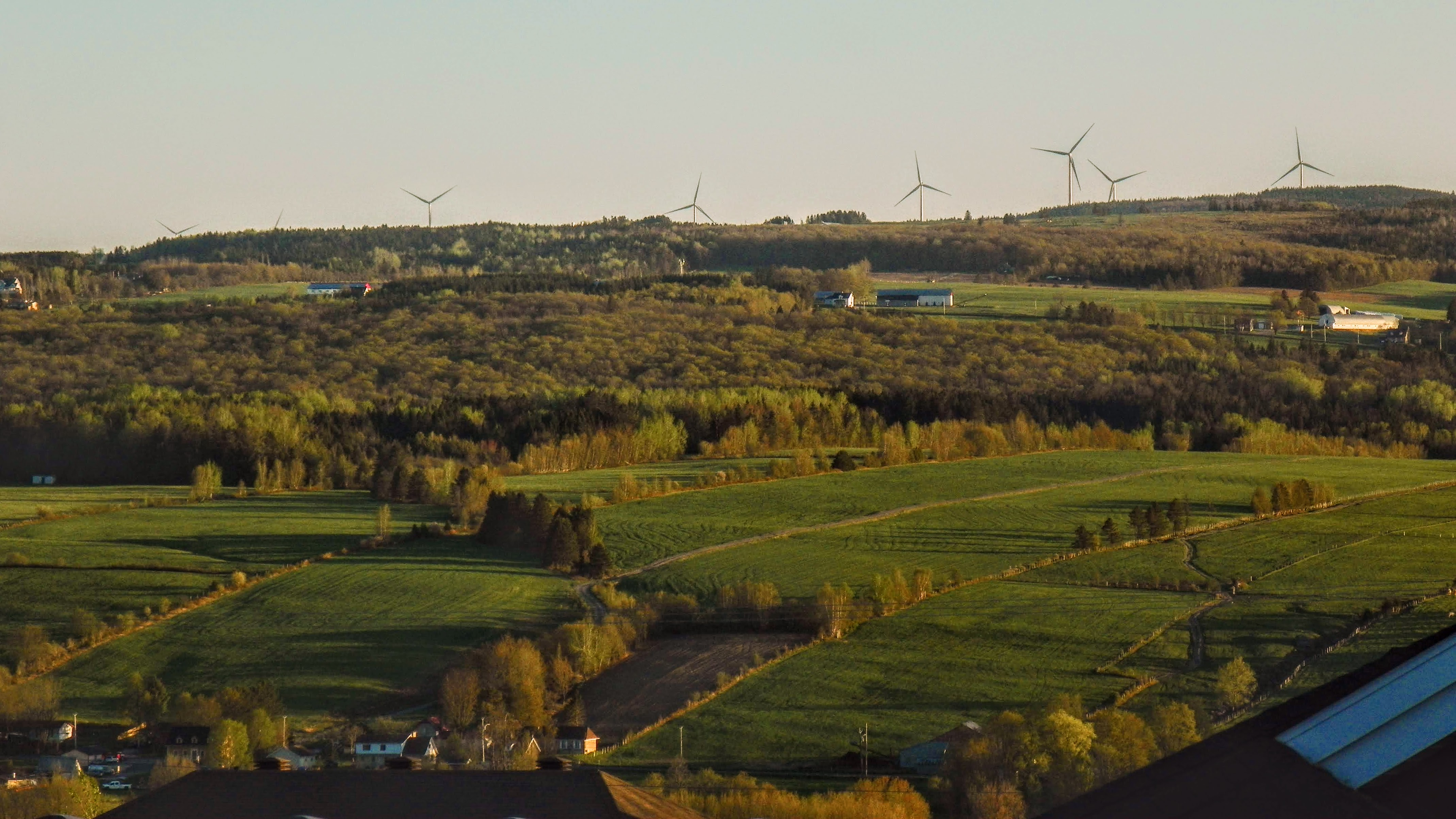
- Nouvelle-Beauce landscape in Sainte-Marie and Saint-Elzéar.

- Coordinates: 46°27′N 71°02′W
- Country: Canada
- Province: Quebec
- Region: Chaudière-Appalaches
- Effective: January 1, 1982
- County seat: Sainte-Marie

Government
  - Type: Prefecture
  - Prefect: Richard Lehoux

Area
  - Total: 911.80 km^{2} (352.05 sq mi)
  - Land: 905.58 km^{2} (349.65 sq mi)

Population (2016)
  - Total: 36,785
  - Density: 40.6/km^{2} (105/sq mi)
  - Change 2011-2016: ▲4.8%
  - Dwellings: 15,501
- Time zone: UTC−5 (EST)
  - Summer (DST): UTC−4 (EDT)
- Area codes: 418 and 581
- Website: www.nouvellebeauce.com

La Nouvelle-Beauce (French pronunciation: [la nuvɛl bos], New Beauce) is a regional county municipality in the Chaudière-Appalaches region in southeastern Quebec, Canada, south of the Saint Lawrence River. It is located south of Lévis, along the Chaudière River.

Established in 1982 as a successor to Dorchester County, La Nouvelle-Beauce is made of 11 municipalities and is mainly French-speaking (99.2% French-speaking in 2006) and rural. Sainte-Marie, the county seat, is the most populous municipality.

The name of La Nouvelle-Beauce reminds the one given to the area along the Chaudière River by the French authorities until the end of the French Regime in North America.

== Subdivisions ==
There are 11 subdivisions within the RCM:

Cities & Towns (1)

- Sainte-Marie

Municipalities (7)

- Frampton
- Saint-Bernard
- Saint-Elzéar
- Saint-Isidore
- Saint-Lambert-de-Lauzon
- Saints-Anges
- Scott
- Vallée-Jonction

Parishes (3)

- Sainte-Hénédine
- Sainte-Marguerite

== Transportation ==
=== Access Routes ===
Highways and numbered routes that run through the municipality, including external routes that start or finish at the county border:

- Autoroutes
  - A-73
- Principal Highways
  - R-112
  - R-171
  - R-173
- Secondary Highways
  - R-216
  - R-218
  - R-275
- External Routes
  - None

== See also ==
- List of regional county municipalities and equivalent territories in Quebec
- Beauce, Quebec
