= Saint-Étienne-de-Lauzon, Quebec =

Coordinates: 46°39′00″N 71°18′00″W

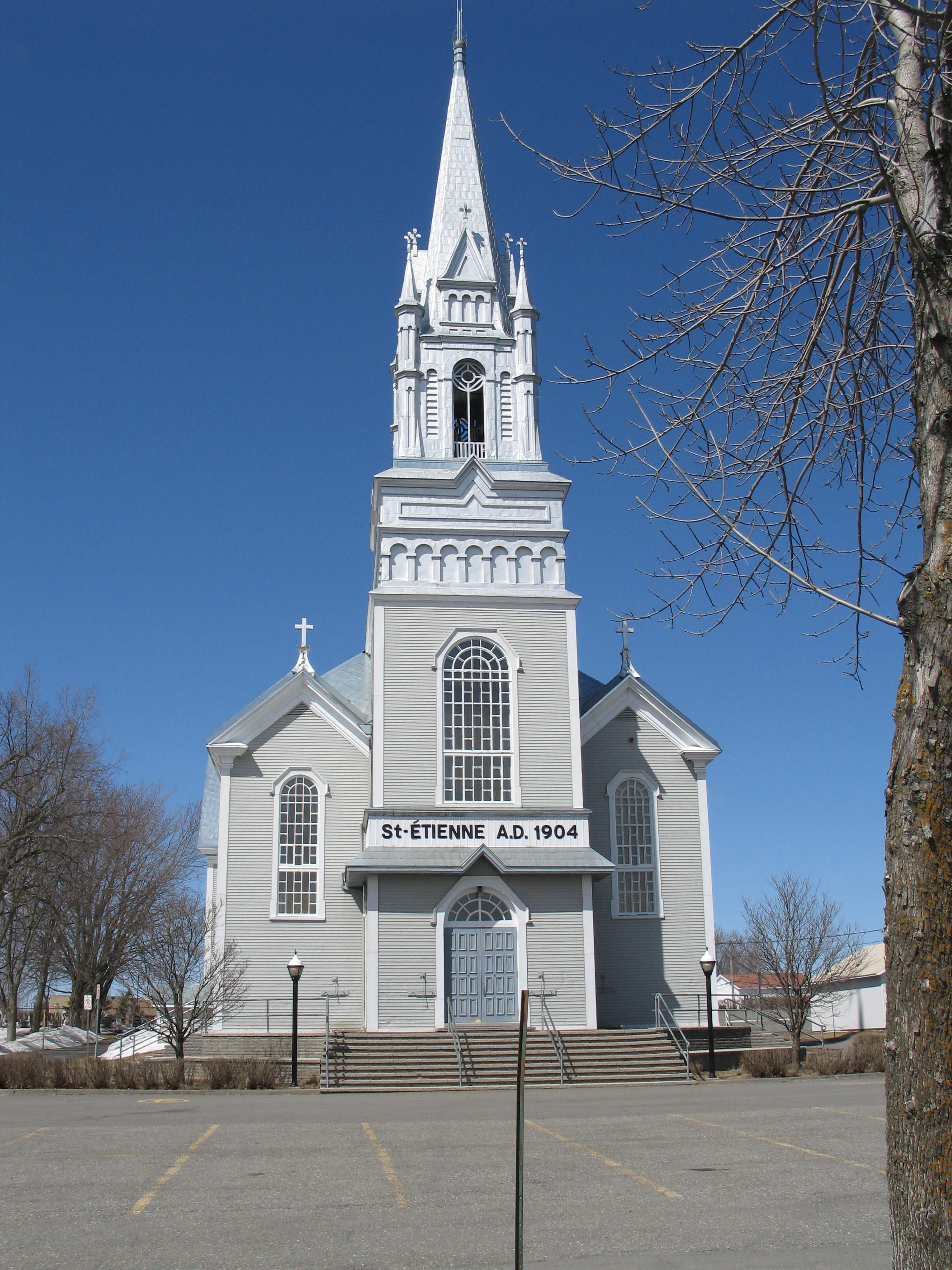
The Saint-Étienne church.

Saint-Étienne-de-Lauzon (French pronunciation: [sɛ̃t‿etjɛn də lozɔ̃]) is a district (secteur) within Les Chutes-de-la-Chaudière-Ouest borough of the city of Lévis. Its population as of the Canada 2011 Census was 9,990.

It was incorporated in 1860 and remained a separate municipality until January 1, 2002, whereafter it became part of Lévis.
