= Saint-Gilles, Quebec =

Saint-Gilles
- Municipality
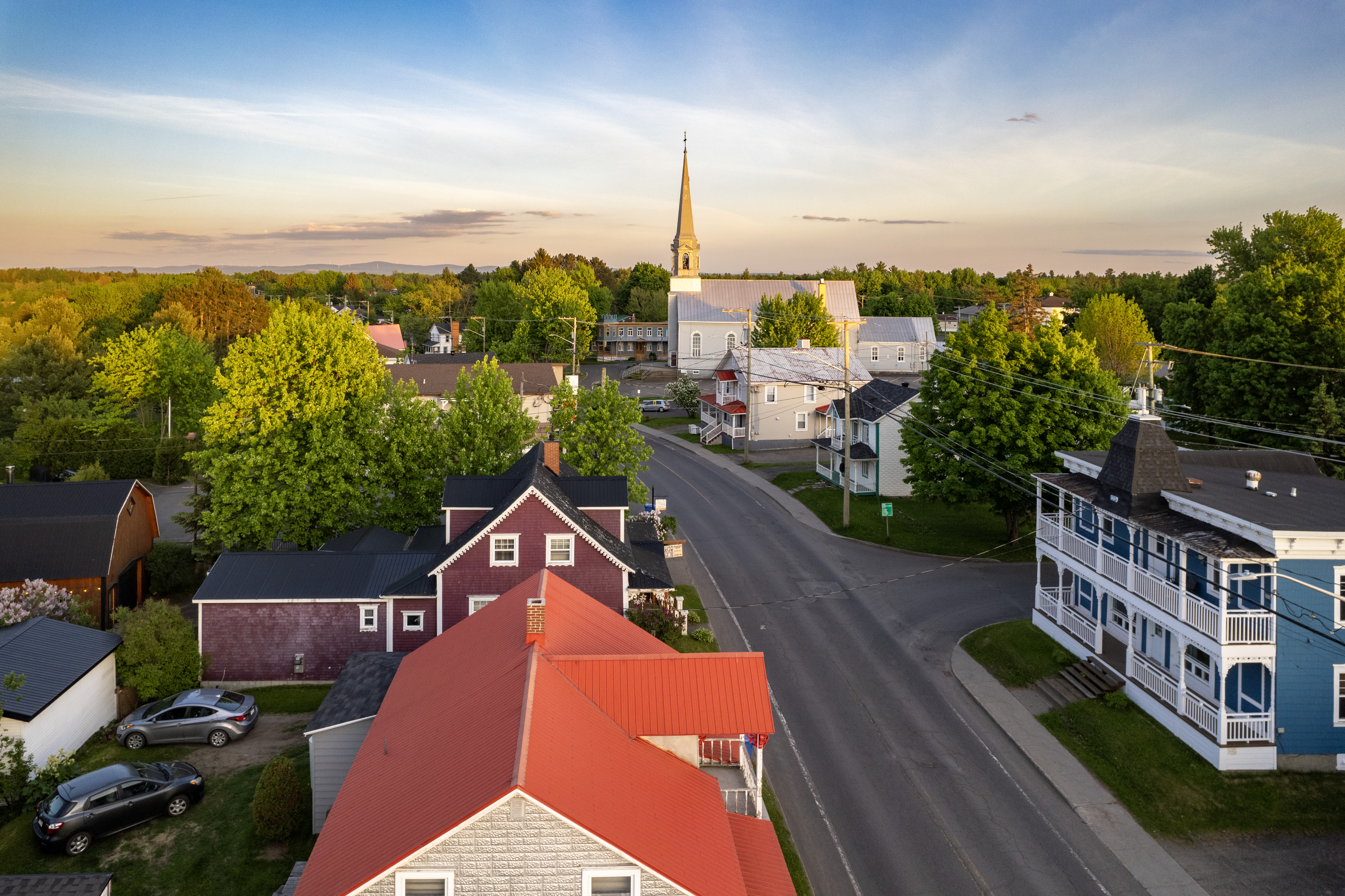
- Aerial view of Saint-Gilles

- Coat of arms

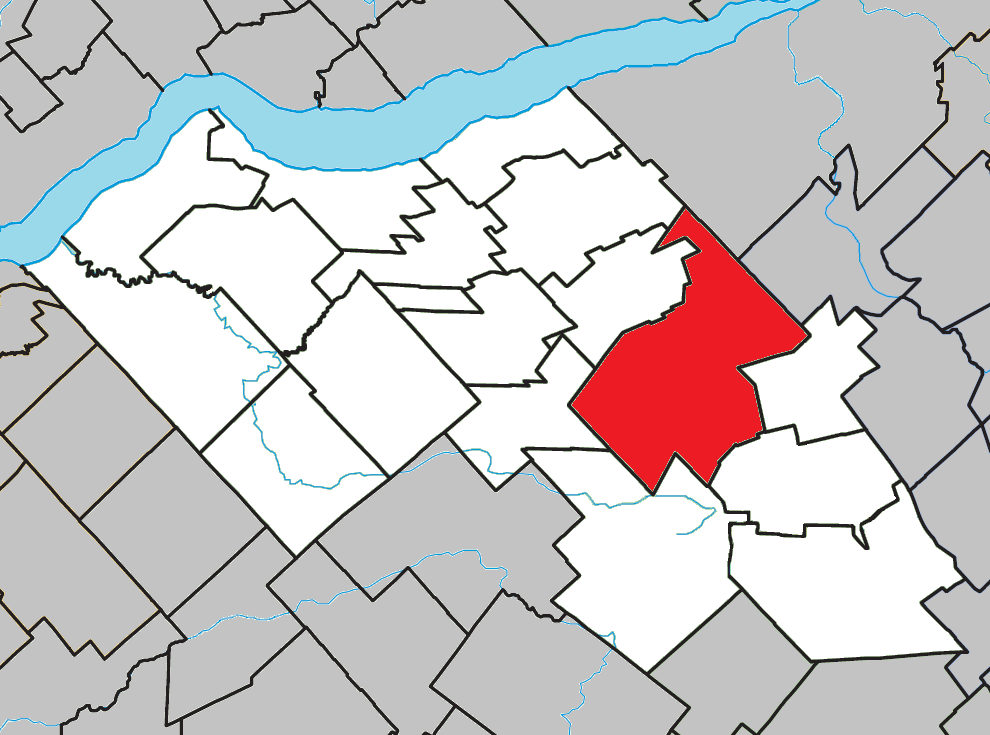
- Location within Lotbinière RCM.

- Location in southern Quebec.
- Coordinates: 46°31′N 71°22′W
- Country: Canada
- Province: Quebec
- Region: Chaudière-Appalaches
- RCM: Lotbinière
- Constituted: July 1, 1855
- Named for: Saint Giles

Government
  - Mayor: Jessy Grondin
  - Federal riding: Lévis—Lotbinière
  - Prov. riding: Lotbinière-Frontenac

Area
  - Total: 180.80 km^{2} (69.81 sq mi)
  - Land: 177.43 km^{2} (68.51 sq mi)

Population (2021)
  - Total: 2,910
  - Density: 16.4/km^{2} (42/sq mi)
  - Pop 2016-2021: ▲15.2%
  - Dwellings: 1,264
- Time zone: UTC−5 (EST)
  - Summer (DST): UTC−4 (EDT)
- Postal code(s): G0S 2P0
- Area codes: 418 and 581
- Highways: R-116; R-218; R-269; R-273
- Website: www.st-gilles.qc.ca

Saint-Gilles (French pronunciation: [sɛ̃ ʒil]) is a municipality in Lotbinière Regional County Municipality in the Chaudière-Appalaches region of Quebec, Canada. Its population was 2,910 as of the Canada 2021 Census.

The municipality has the largest surface area in Lotbinière Regional County Municipality, with a surface area of around 177.43 km2 and a population density of around 16.4 inhabitants/km2.

Saint-Gilles is named after the seigneurie of Saint-Gilles of which it was part. It was granted in 1738 to Gilles Rageot de Beaurivage (1689-1754), an important merchant from Quebec.
