= Chaudière-Appalaches =

- Region
- Map of Chaudière-Appalaches within Quebec.
- Coordinates: 46°29′N 70°37′W
- Country: Canada
- Province: Quebec

Government
  - Table régionale des élus municipaux de la Chaudière-Appalaches (Regional conference of elected officers): Maurice Sénécal (President)

Area
  - Land: 15,071.51 km^{2} (5,819.14 sq mi)

Population (2021)
  - Total: 433,312
  - Density: 28.8/km^{2} (75/sq mi)
- Website: www.chaudiere-appalaches.gouv.qc.ca

Chaudière-Appalaches (French: [ʃodjɛʁ apalaʃ], Quebec French: [ʃoˈd͡zjaɛ̯ʁ apaˈlaʃ]) is an administrative region in Quebec, Canada. It comprises most of what is historically known as the "Beauce" (French: La Beauce; compare with the electoral district of Beauce). It is named for the Chaudière River and the Appalachian Mountains. Chaudière-Appalaches has over 50% of sugar maples in Quebec, thus producing the most maple syrup in Canada as well as the World.

Chaudière-Appalaches has a population of 433,312 residents (as of the Canada 2021 Census) and a land area of 15,071.51 square kilometres (5,819.14 sq mi). The main cities are Lévis, Saint-Georges, Thetford Mines, Sainte-Marie and Montmagny.

== Administrative divisions ==
=== Regional county municipalities ===
Regional County Municipality (RCM)	Population Canada 2021 Census	Land Area	Density (pop. per km^{2})	Seat of RCM
Beauce-Centre	19,253	839.60 km^{2} (324.17 sq mi)	22.9	Beauceville
Beauce-Sartigan	53,384	1,952.73 km^{2} (753.95 sq mi)	27.3	Saint-Georges
Bellechasse	38,000	1,749.91 km^{2} (675.64 sq mi)	21.7	Saint-Lazare-de-Bellechasse
La Nouvelle-Beauce	37,988	905.33 km^{2} (349.55 sq mi)	42.0	Sainte-Marie
Les Appalaches	43,412	1,911.83 km^{2} (738.16 sq mi)	22.7	Thetford Mines
Les Etchemins	16,927	1,809.61 km^{2} (698.69 sq mi)	9.4	Lac-Etchemin
L'Islet	17,598	2,097.09 km^{2} (809.69 sq mi)	8.4	Saint-Jean-Port-Joli
Lotbinière	34,586	1,662.26 km^{2} (641.80 sq mi)	20.8	Sainte-Croix
Montmagny	22,481	1,695.09 km^{2} (654.48 sq mi)	13.3	Montmagny

=== Equivalent territory ===
Territory Equivalent to a RCM (TE)	Population Canada 2021 Census	Land Area	Density (pop. per km^{2})	Seat of RCM
Lévis	149,683	448.07 km^{2} (173.00 sq mi)	334.1	Lévis

== Major communities ==
- Beauceville
- L'Islet
- Lac-Etchemin
- Lévis
- Montmagny
- Saint-Agapit
- Saint-Anselme
- Saint-Apollinaire
- Saint-Georges
- Saint-Henri
- Saint-Joseph-de-Beauce
- Saint-Lambert-de-Lauzon
- Sainte-Marie
- Thetford Mines

== Landmarks ==
See: List of historic places in Chaudière-Appalaches
