= Saint-André River =

River in Chaudière-Appalaches, Quebec, Canada

- Location within Quebec
- Native name: Rivière Saint-André (French)

Location
- Country: Canada
- Province: Quebec
- Administrative region: Chaudière-Appalaches
- RCM: Lotbinière Regional County Municipality

Physical characteristics
- Source: Agricultural streams
  - location: Saint-Sylvestre
  - coordinates: 46.365491°N 71.219533°W
  - elevation: 297 metres (974 ft)
- Mouth: Filkars River
  - location: Sainte-Agathe-de-Lotbinière)
  - coordinates: 46.39778°N 71.32278°W
  - elevation: 161 metres (528 ft)
- Length: 12.5 kilometres (7.8 mi)

Basin features
- Progression: Filkars River, Beaurivage River, Chaudière River, St. Lawrence
- Tributaries
  - left: (upstream)
  - right: (upstream)

The Saint-André river (in French: rivière Saint-André) is a tributary of the Filkars River whose current flows successively into the Beaurivage River, the west bank of the Chaudière River and the south shore of the St. Lawrence River. It flows in the municipalities of Saint-Sylvestre and Sainte-Agathe-de-Lotbinière, in the Lotbinière Regional County Municipality, in the administrative region of Chaudière-Appalaches, in Québec, in Canada.

== Geography ==
The main neighboring watersheds of the Saint-André river are:

- north side: Fourchette River, Filkars River, Beaurivage River;
- east side: Beaurivage River, Nadeau River, Lessard River, Vallée River, Boiler River;
- south side: Filkars River, Palmer River, Palmer East River;
- west side: Armagh River, Saint-Georges River, rivière du Chêne, Henri River.

The Saint-André River has its source in the municipality of Saint-Sylvestre, at 0.6 kilometres (0.37 mi) east of the village center. This headland is located south of route 216, north of Mont Handkerchief and south of the village of Saint-Patrice-de-Beaurivage.

From its source, the Saint-André River flows over 12.5 kilometres (7.8 mi) divided into the following segments:

- 0.4 kilometres (0.25 mi) north-east, up to route 216 which it crosses at 0.8 kilometres (0.50 mi) to the north-east the village of Saint-Sylvestre;
- 2.4 kilometres (1.5 mi) north-east, then west, up to the Moulin road that it crosses at 1.3 kilometres (0.81 mi) north-of the village center of Saint-Sylvestre;
- 3.2 kilometres (2.0 mi) towards the southwest, in Saint-Sylvestre, to the confluence of a stream (coming from the west);
- 1.4 kilometres (0.87 mi) northwesterly, to route 269;
- 4.4 kilometres (2.7 mi) north-west, to the limit of Sainte-Agathe-de-Lotbinière which it runs along for 300 metres (980 ft);
- 0.7 kilometres (0.43 mi) towards the northeast, up to its confluence.

The Saint-André river empties on the south bank of the Filkars River in the eastern part of the territory of Sainte-Agathe-de-Lotbinière. This confluence is located 2.7 kilometres (1.7 mi) upstream from the confluence of the Filkars River.

== Toponymy ==
The toponym "rivière Saint-André" was formalized on December 5, 1968, at the Commission de toponymie du Québec.

== See also ==
- List of rivers of Quebec
