= Fourchette River =

River in Chaudière-Appalaches, Quebec (Canada)

- Location within Quebec
- Native name: Rivière Fourchette (French)

Location
- Country: Canada
- Province: Quebec
- Administrative region: Chaudière-Appalaches
- RCM: Lotbinière Regional County Municipality

Physical characteristics
- Source: Mountain streams
  - location: Saint-Sylvestre
  - coordinates: 46.377336°N 71.209398°W
  - elevation: 279 metres (915 ft)
- Mouth: Filkars River
  - location: Saint-Patrice-de-Beaurivage)
  - coordinates: 46.40472°N 71.29722°W
  - elevation: 156 metres (512 ft)
- Length: 19.9 kilometres (12.4 mi)

Basin features
- Progression: Filkars River, Beaurivage River, Chaudière River, St. Lawrence
- Tributaries
  - left: (upstream)
  - right: (upstream)

The Fourchette River (in French: rivière Fourchette) is a tributary of the Filkars River whose current flows successively into the Beaurivage River, the west bank of the Chaudière River and the south bank of the St. Lawrence River.

The Fourchette river flows through the municipalities of Saint-Sylvestre and Saint-Patrice-de-Beaurivage, in the Lotbinière Regional County Municipality, in the administrative region of Chaudière-Appalaches, in Québec, in Canada.

== Geography ==
The main neighboring watersheds of the Fourchette river are:

- north side: Filkars River, Beaurivage River;
- east side: Beaurivage River, Nadeau River, Vallée River, Chaudière River;
- south side: Saint-André River, Filkars River, Palmer River;
- west side: Saint-André River, Armagh River, Saint-Georges River, rivière aux Chevreuils.

The Fourchette River has its source in the municipality of Saint-Sylvestre, at 1.9 kilometres (1.2 mi) northeast of the village center. This headland is located north of route 216, 7.1 kilometres (4.4 mi) north of the summit of Mount Handkerchief and 4.0 kilometres (2.5 mi) south-east of the center of the village of Saint-Patrice-de-Beaurivage.

From its source located in Saint-Sylvestre, the Fourchette River flows on 19.9 kilometres (12.4 mi) divided into the following segments:

- 0.5 kilometres (0.31 mi) towards the northeast, in Saint-Sylvestre;
- 4.2 kilometres (2.6 mi) towards the north, forming a large curve to the east, as it traverses 2.1 kilometres (1.3 mi) in two segments in Saint-Patrice-de-Beaurivage because of an appendage to the south of the territory of Saint-Patrice-de-Beaurivage;
- 4.3 kilometres (2.7 mi) towards the north-west, in Saint-Sylvestre, then in Saint-Patrice-de-Beaurivage, until the route du Moulin;
- 9.0 kilometres (5.6 mi) westward, in Saint-Patrice-de-Beaurivage, to Craig Road;
- 1.9 kilometres (1.2 mi) north-west, up to its confluence.

The Fourchette river empties on the south bank of the Filkars River in the municipality of Saint-Patrice-de-Beaurivage. This confluence is located 2.7 kilometres (1.7 mi) upstream from the confluence of the Filkars River and 1.1 kilometres (0.68 mi) upstream from the "Route du Petit Lac" road.

== Toponymy ==
The toponym "rivière Fourchette" was made official on August 8, 1977, at the Commission de toponymie du Québec.

== See also ==
- List of rivers of Quebec
