= Lotbinière (provincial electoral district) =

Former provincial electoral district in Quebec, Canada

Quebec electoral district

Defunct provincial electoral district
- Legislature: National Assembly of Quebec
- District created: 1867
- District abolished: 2011
- First contested: 1867
- Last contested: 2008

Demographics
- Population (2001): 43,648
- Electors (2008): 34,347
- Area (km²): 3,464.1
- Census division(s): Arthabaska (part), Bécancour (part), L'Érable (part), Lotbinière (all)
- Census subdivision(s): Deschaillons-sur-Saint-Laurent, Dosquet, Fortierville, Inverness, Laurier-Station, Laurierville, Leclercville, Lemieux, Lotbinière, Lyster, Manseau, Notre-Dame-de-Lourdes, Notre-Dame-du-Sacré-Coeur-d'Issoudun, Parisville, Saint-Agapit, Sainte-Agathe-de-Lotbinière, Saint-Antoine-de-Tilly, Saint-Apollinaire, Sainte-Cécile-de-Lévrard, Sainte-Croix, Saint-Édouard-de-Lotbinière, Saint-Ferdinand, Saint-Flavien, Sainte-Françoise, Saint-Gilles, Saint-Janvier-de-Joly, Saint-Louis-de-Blandford, Sainte-Marie-de-Blandford, Saint-Narcisse-de-Beaurivage, Saint-Patrice-de-Beaurivage, Saint-Pierre-Baptiste, Saint-Pierre-les-Becquets, Sainte-Sophie-de-Lévrard, Sainte-Sophie-d'Halifax, Saint-Sylvestre, Val-Alain, Villeroy

Lotbinière (French pronunciation: [lɔtbinjɛʁ]) is a former provincial electoral district in the Centre-du-Québec and Chaudière-Appalaches regions of Quebec, Canada. As of its final election, it included the municipalities of Lotbinière, Saint-Flavien, Lemieux, Laurierville, Saint-Antoine-de-Tilly, Sainte-Croix, and Laurier-Station.

It was created for the 1867 election (and an electoral district of that name existed earlier in the Legislative Assembly of the Province of Canada and the Legislative Assembly of Lower Canada). Its final election was in 2008. It disappeared in the 2012 election and the successor electoral districts were Lotbinière-Frontenac, Nicolet-Bécancour, and Arthabaska.

== Members of the Legislative Assembly / National Assembly ==
- Henri-Gustave Joly de Lotbinière, Liberal (1867–1885)
- Édouard-Hippolyte Laliberté, Liberal (1886–1900)
- Napoleon Lemay, Conservative – Liberal (1900–1908)
- Joseph-Napoléon Francoeur, Liberal (1908–1936)
- Maurice Pelletier, Union Nationale (1936–1939)
- René Chaloult, Liberal (1939–1944)
- Guy Roberge, Liberal (1944–1948)
- René Bernatchez, Union Nationale (1948–1970)
- Jean-Louis Béland, Ralliement creditiste (1970–1973)
- Georges Massicotte, Liberal (1973–1976)
- Rodrigue Biron, Union Nationale (1976–1980), Parti Québécois (1980–1985)
- Lewis Camden, Liberal (1985–1994)
- Jean-Guy Paré, Parti Québécois (1994–2003)
- Sylvie Roy, Action démocratique (2003–2012), CAQ (2012)

== Election results ==
2008 Quebec general election
Party	Candidate	Votes	%	±%
Action démocratique	Sylvie Roy	9,659	43.98	-15.24
Liberal	Julie Champagne	7,577	34.50	+12.61
Parti Québécois	Guy St-Pierre	4,238	19.30	+2.82
Québec solidaire	Guillaume Dorval	488	2.22	-0.19

2007 Quebec general election
Party	Candidate	Votes	%	±%
Action démocratique	Sylvie Roy	15,472	59.22	+21.77
Liberal	Laurent Boissonneault	5,720	21.89	-12.61
Parti Québécois	Annie Thériault	4,305	16.48	-9.09
Québec solidaire	Catherine Drolet	630	2.41	+1.72*

* Increase is from UFP

2003 Quebec general election: Lotbinière
Party	Candidate	Votes	%	±%
Action démocratique	Sylvie Roy	9,522	37.45	+23.00
Liberal	Monique Drolet Glazier	8,773	34.50	-3.41
Parti Québécois	Jean-Guy Paré	6,502	25.57	-22.07
Green	Marc Allard	306	1.20	–
UFP	Étienne Hallé	175	0.69	–
Christian Democracy	Paul Biron	150	0.59	–
Total valid votes		25,428	98.85	
Rejected and declined votes		296	1.15	-0.14
Turnout		25,724	77.57	-3.89
Electors on the lists		33,161		
Source: Official Results, Government of Quebec
Action démocratique gain from Parti Québécois		Swing		+22.54

1998 Quebec general election: Lotbinière
Party	Candidate	Votes	%	±%
Parti Québécois	Jean-Guy Paré	11,496	47.64	+2.08
Liberal	Christian Lessard	9,148	37.91	-6.41
Action démocratique	Claude Carignan	3,486	14.45	–
Total valid votes		24,130	98.71	
Rejected and declined votes		315	1.29	-1.10
Turnout		24,445	81.46	+0.58
Electors on the lists		30,007		
Source: Official Results, Government of Quebec
Parti Québécois hold		Swing		+4.25

1995 Quebec referendum
Side	Votes	%
Oui	13,263	50.10
Non	13,209	49.90

1994 Quebec general election: Lotbinière
Party	Candidate	Votes	%	±%
Parti Québécois	Jean-Guy Paré	10,398	45.56	+10.81
Liberal	Lewis Camden	10,115	44.32	-15.53
Independent	Denis Cameron	2,308	10.11	–
Total valid votes		22,821	97.61	
Rejected and declined votes		558	2.39	+0.40
Turnout		23,379	80.88	+2.62
Electors on the lists		28,906		
Source: Official Results, Government of Quebec
Parti Québécois gain from Liberal		Swing		+13.17

1992 Charlottetown Accord referendum
Side	Votes	%
Non	14,165	60.77
Oui	9,145	39.23

1989 Quebec general election
Party	Candidate	Votes	%	±%
Liberal	Lewis Camden	13,335	59.85	+6.33
Parti Québécois	Alonzo Le Blanc	7,742	34.75	-10.36
New Democrat	Allen Guilbert	616	2.76	-
Lemon	Martin Bussières	589	2.64	-

1985 Quebec general election
Party	Candidate	Votes	%	±%
Liberal	Lewis Camden	12,382	53.52	+10.32
Parti Québécois	Rodrigue Biron	10,437	45.11	-3.83
Christian Socialist	Guy Martin	317	1.37	-

1981 Quebec general election
Party	Candidate	Votes	%	±%
Parti Québécois	Rodrigue Biron	11,653	48.94	+29.47
Liberal	Jean Tremblay	10,288	43.20	+19.35
Union Nationale	Denis Lacasse	1,872	7.86	-44.36

1980 Quebec referendum
Side	Votes	%
Non	15,627	62.91
Oui	9,212	37.09

1976 Quebec general election
Party	Candidate	Votes	%	±%
Union Nationale	Rodrigue Biron	12,355	52.22	+41.52
Liberal	Georges-J.-P. Massicotte	5,642	23.85	-24.26
Parti Québécois	Ghyslain Théberge	4,605	19.47	+8.21
Ralliement créditiste	Gaston Judd	1,055	4.46	-25.47

1973 Quebec general election
Party	Candidate	Votes	%	±%
Liberal	Georges-J.-P. Massicotte	9,907	48.11	+15.02
Parti créditiste	Jean-Louis Béland	6,163	29.93	-5.91
Parti Québécois	Robert Bergeron	2,318	11.26	+7.52
Union Nationale	Fernand Grenier	2,204	10.70	-16.63

== See also ==
- List of Quebec provincial electoral districts
- Canadian provincial electoral districts
