= Saint-Georges River =

River in Chaudière-Appalaches, Quebec, Canada

- Location within Quebec
- Native name: Rivière Saint-Georges (French)

Location
- Country: Canada
- Province: Quebec
- Region: Chaudière-Appalaches
- MRC: Lotbinière Regional County Municipality

Physical characteristics
- Source: Agricultural and forest streams
  - location: Sainte-Agathe-de-Lotbinière
  - coordinates: 46.385162°N 71.422569°W
  - elevation: 158 metres (518 ft)
- Mouth: Rivière du Chêne
  - location: Sainte-Agathe-de-Lotbinière
  - coordinates: 46.39694°N 71.43389°W
  - elevation: 144 metres (472 ft)
- Length: 2.8 kilometres (1.7 mi)

Basin features
- River system: St. Lawrence River
- Tributaries
  - left: (upstream)
  - right: (upstream)

The Saint-Georges river is a tributary of the south shore of the Chêne River which flows on the south shore of the St. Lawrence River. The Saint-Georges river flows in the municipality of Sainte-Agathe-de-Lotbinière, in Lotbinière Regional County Municipality, in the administrative region of Chaudière-Appalaches, in Quebec, in Canada.

== Geography ==
The main watersheds neighboring the Saint-Georges River are:

- north side: rivière du Chêne;
- east side: Armagh River, Filkars River;
- south side: rivière aux Chevreuils, Palmer River, Bécancour River;
- west side: rivière du Chêne, Henri River.

The Saint-Georges river has its source on the east side of the village of Sainte-Agathe-de-Lotbinière. This head area is located north of the Bécancour River, in the Sainte-Agathe falls area. This river flows on 2.8 kilometres (1.7 mi) towards the northwest, with a drop of 14 metres (46 ft), until its confluence.

The Saint-Georges river empties on the south bank of the rivière du Chêne (Leclercville), at 3.1 kilometres (1.9 mi) (in direct line) northeast of the center of the village of Sainte-Agathe-de-Lotbinière.

== Toponymy ==
The toponym Rivière Saint-Georges was formalized on August 8, 1977, at the Commission de toponymie du Québec.

== See also ==
- List of rivers of Quebec
