= Filkars River =

River in Chaudière-Appalaches, Quebec (Canada)

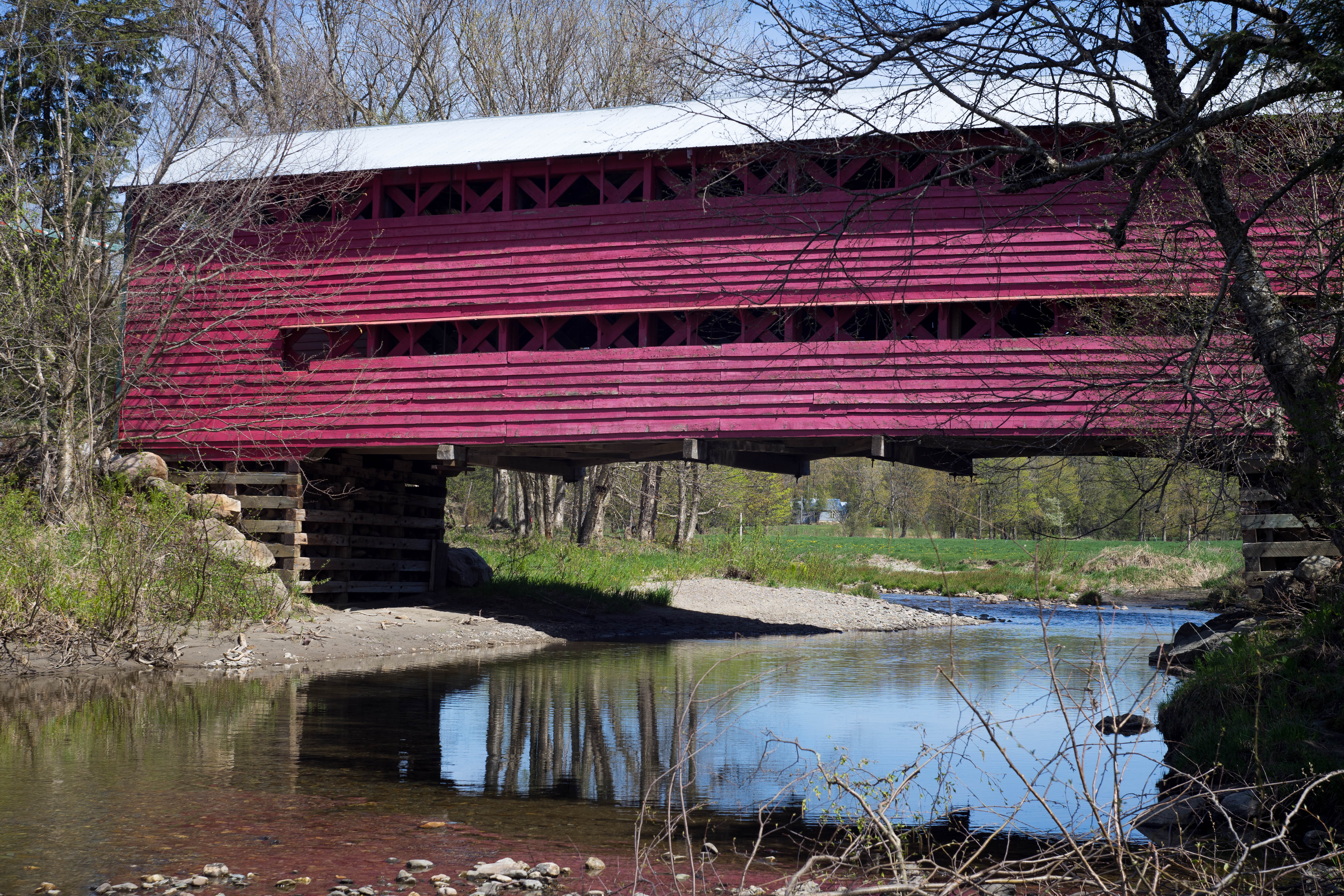

- Location within Quebec
- Native name: Rivière Filkars (French)

Location
- Country: Canada
- Province: Quebec
- Administrative region: Chaudière-Appalaches
- RCM: Lotbinière Regional County Municipality

Physical characteristics
- Source: Mountain streams
  - location: Saint-Sylvestre
  - coordinates: 46.328279°N 71.157247°W
  - elevation: 490 metres (1,610 ft)
- Mouth: Beaurivage River
  - location: Saint-Patrice-de-Beaurivage)
  - coordinates: 46.42°N 71.29639°W
  - elevation: 151 metres (495 ft)
- Length: 30.2 kilometres (18.8 mi)

Basin features
- Progression: Beaurivage River, Chaudière River, St. Lawrence
- Tributaries
  - left: (upstream) Armagh River, ruisseau Sylvain.
  - right: (upstream) Fourchette River, Saint-André River, décharge de la Route Sainte-Marguerite.

The Filkars River (in French: rivière Filkars) is a tributary of the Beaurivage River which is a tributary of the west bank of the Chaudière River (slope of the south bank of the St. Lawrence River). It flows in the municipalities of Saint-Sylvestre, Sainte-Agathe-de-Lotbinière and Saint-Patrice-de-Beaurivage, in the Lotbinière Regional County Municipality, in the administrative region of Chaudière-Appalaches, in Québec, in Canada.

== Geography ==
The main neighboring watersheds of the Filkars river are:

- north side: rivière du Chêne, Henri River, Beaurivage River;
- east side: Saint-André River, Fourchette River, Beaurivage River, Nadeau River, Lessard River, Chaudière River;
- south side: Bécancour River, Palmer River, Palmer East River;
- west side: Armagh River, Bécancour River.

The Filkars River originates from a small lake (altitude: 490 metres (1,610 ft)) in the southeastern part of the municipality of Saint-Sylvestre at 6.1 kilometres (3.8 mi) south-east of the village. This head area is located near the locality "Le Radar", that is to say to the northeast of the summit of Mont Handkerchief and to the southwest of the summit of Mont Sainte-Marguerite, to the north of the Palmer River and northeast of the village of Saint-Pierre-de-Broughton.

From its source, the Filkars River flows over 30.2 kilometres (18.8 mi) divided into the following segments:

Upper course of the river (segment of 21.9 kilometres (13.6 mi))

From the small head lake dam, the Filkars river flows over:

- 5.9 kilometres (3.7 mi) north-west, to a country road;
- 4.4 kilometres (2.7 mi) west, to route 216, which it intersects at 3.3 kilometres (2.1 mi) to the southwest from the center of the village of Saint-Sylvestre;
- 3.5 kilometres (2.2 mi) west, up to route 269 which it intersects at 3.6 kilometres (2.2 mi) north of the hamlet of Wilson;
- 3.3 kilometres (2.1 mi) north-west, up to the road;
- 2.8 kilometres (1.7 mi) north-west, to the limit of the municipality of Sainte-Agathe-de-Lotbinière;
- 2.0 kilometres (1.2 mi) north to the confluence of the Armagh River (coming from the west);

Lower course of the river (segment of 8.3 kilometres (5.2 mi))

From the confluence of the Armagh River, the Filkars River flows over:

- 3.3 kilometres (2.1 mi) (or 2.1 kilometres (1.3 mi) in a direct line) towards the northeast, collecting the waters of the Saint-André River (coming from the south-east) and winding up to the limit of Saint-Patrice-de-Beaurivage;
- 0.3 kilometres (0.19 mi) east, to a country road;
- 3.1 kilometres (1.9 mi) (or 1.6 kilometres (0.99 mi) in a direct line) towards the northeast, collecting the waters of the Fourchette River (coming from the southeast), as well as winding up to the limit, up to the "route du Petit Lac";
- 1.6 kilometres (0.99 mi) northeasterly, crossing route 269, to its confluence.

The Filkars river empties on the south bank of the Beaurivage River at 4.5 kilometres (2.8 mi) west of the village of Saint-Patrice-de-Beaurivage and north of the hamlet Parkhurst.

== Toponymy ==
Filkars would be derived from Felker's (owned by Felker) after the name of a landowner from New Hampshire.
David Felker lived in Saint-Sylvestre between 1824 and 1839.

== See also ==
- List of rivers of Quebec
