= Lewis Camden =

Canadian politician

Mayor of Saint-Patrice-de-Beaurivage
- In office 1 November 2009 – 2 November 2013
- Preceded by: Marlène Demers
- Succeeded by: Claude Fortin

Member of the National Assembly of Quebec for Lotbinière
- In office 2 December 1985 – 11 September 1994
- Preceded by: Rodrigue Biron
- Succeeded by: Jean-Guy Paré

Personal details
- Born: 17 March 1953 (age 73) Saint-Patrice-de-Beaurivage, Quebec
- Party: Quebec Liberal Party
- Education: Laval University

Lewis Camden (born 17 March 1953) is a Canadian politician and civil servant from the province of Quebec. He was a member of the National Assembly of Quebec for Lotbinière under the banner of the Quebec Liberal Party from 1985 to the general election of 1994, in which he was defeated by the Parti Québécois candidate Jean-Guy Paré. Subsequently, he was mayor of Saint-Patrice-de-Beaurivage from 2009 to 2013.

== Biography ==
=== Youth and career before politics ===
Lewis Camden was born on March 17, 1953, in Saint-Patrice-de-Beaurivage to mechanic Patrick Camden and his wife Louise Morin. He has a sister, Carole Camden. He studied at the Polyvalente Benoît-Vachon in Sainte-Marie-de-Beauce, then at the Collège de Lévis. He completed his bachelor's degree in political science at Université Laval in 1978.

In 1976, he was secretary to the provincial member for Lotbinière, Georges Massicotte, and a member of the information committee for the advertising campaign for the 1976 Quebec general election. Two years later, he was president of the Quebec Liberal Party's grassroots fundraising campaign. In 1979, he was assistant to the returning officer for Lotbinière, then assistant to the federal Member of Parliament for Lotbinière, Jean-Guy Dubois, from 1980 to 1984.

=== Political career ===
In the 1985 Quebec general election, he was elected in Lotbinière as a Liberal to the National Assembly of Quebec defeating Rodrigue Biron from the Parti Québécois (PQ).From February 5, 1986, to March 15, 1988, he was a member of the Commission on Agriculture, Fisheries and Food. From March 12, 1987, to August 9, 1989, Camden was a member of the Planning and Development Commission. From 1986 to 1989, he was a member of the Ministers' Caucus of the Subcommittee on Agriculture, the Dairy Livestock Planning Team and the Caucus of the Subcommittee on Municipal Affairs. From 1987 to 1989, he participated in the France-Quebec Cooperation Committee. In April 1988, when the Star Pants factory in Laurierville was announced to be closing, Camden intervened to save the jobs of 135 people. With neighbouring MNA Laurier Gardner, who also saw people affected by the closure in his riding, he put pressure on the head of the company. In the 1988 Canadian federal election, Camden supported his friend, Pierre Lajeunesse who stood as a Liberal candidate, which irritated the Progressive Conservative Maurice Tremblay, who ended up winning the riding. Camden later corrected his opinion, stating that he had never been against Tremblay, but had simply supported a friend. In the 1989 Quebec general election, he was re-elected, defeating the Parti Québécois (PQ) candidate Alonzo le Blanc.

From 1988 to 1990, he was a member of the board of directors of the Socioeconomic Conference of the Chaudière-Appalaches region, then from 1991, of the Regional Council for Consultation and Development of the Chaudière-Appalaches region. From 1992, he was a member of the regional development council of the Mauricie-Bois-Francs-Drummond region. From March 10, 1994, to July 24 In the same year, he was vice-president of the Social Affairs Committee. He was narrowly defeated by the PQ candidate Jean-Guy Paré in the 1994 Quebec general election.

On 1 November 2009, he was chosen unopposed to become the mayor of his municipality, Saint-Patrice-de-Beaurivage. He did not encounter any opposition. While he was mayor, the municipality faced the summer flooding of the Beaurivage. He organized the evacuation of the dozens of houses affected and relocated the temporarily affected residents to the gymnasium of the Source school. He did not seek a second term and was replaced in 2013 by Claude Fortin.

=== Post-political career ===
From April 17, 2013, to June 30, 2018, he was a member of the Association of Towing Professionals of Quebec. Camden and his colleague Réjean Breton contacted Richard Dionne of the Ministry of Transport to modify clauses in the contracts awarded to towing companies.

He is a member of the board of directors of the Jean-Charles Bonenfant Foundation, whose goal is to help young people in Quebec flourish.

He is involved in the board of directors of the Association of Former Parliamentarians of the National Assembly of Quebec as an administrator from May 2005 to May 2006, vice-president from May 2006 to May 2008 and administrator from May 2008 to May 2009.

== See also ==
- 33rd Quebec Legislature
- 34th Quebec Legislature
- Lotbinière
- Lotbinière-Frontenac

=== Bibliography ===
- Deschênes, Gaston (1993). Dictionnaire des parlementaires du Québec (in French). Ville de Québec: Presses de l'Université Laval. ISBN 2-7637-7304-4..
- Normandin, P. G. (1994). The Canadian Parliamentary Guide. Gale Canada..
- Cournoyer, Jean (6 January 2022). "Camden (Lewis)". La Mémoire du Québec (in French).
