= Rivière aux Chevreuils =

River in Centre-du-Québec, Quebec (Canada)

- Location within Quebec

Location
- Country: Canada
- Province: Quebec
- Region: Chaudière-Appalaches
- MRC: L'Érable Regional County Municipality, Lotbinière Regional County Municipality

Physical characteristics
- Source: Agricultural and forest streams
  - location: Sainte-Agathe-de-Lotbinière
  - coordinates: 46.339848°N 71.4255°W
  - elevation: 187 metres (614 ft)
- Mouth: Rivière du Chêne
  - location: Val-Alain
  - coordinates: 46.42111°N 71.69611°W
  - elevation: 118 metres (387 ft)
- Length: 25.6 kilometres (15.9 mi)

Basin features
- River system: St. Lawrence River
- Tributaries
  - left: (upstream) ruisseau Bisson-Laflamme
  - right: (upstream) cours d'eau Noël

The Rivière aux Chevreuils (in English: Deer River) is a tributary of the south shore of the rivière du Chêne which empties on the south shore of the St. Lawrence River, in the administrative region of Chaudière-Appalaches, in Quebec, in Canada.

The “Rivière aux Chevreuils” flows through the regional county municipalities (MRC) of:

- L'Érable Regional County Municipality: municipality of Lyster;
- Lotbinière Regional County Municipality: municipalities of Sainte-Agathe-de-Lotbinière, Saint-Janvier-de-Joly and Val-Alain.

== Geography ==
The main neighboring watersheds of the “Rivière aux Chevreuils” are:

- north side: rivière du Chêne, Saint-Georges River;
- east side: Armagh River, Filkars River;
- south side: Palmer River, Perdrix River, Bécancour River;
- west side: rivière du Chêne.

The Rivière aux Chevreuils has its source south of the village of Sainte-Agathe-de-Lotbinière, near Chemin Gosford. This head area is located to the north of the Bécancour River, in the “Chutes de Sainte-Agathe” area.

From its source, the “Rivière aux Chevreuils” flows more or less in parallel (south side) with Rivière du Chêne (Leclercville) and on the north side of Perdrix River. Its course descends over 25.6 kilometres (15.9 mi) with a drop of 69 metres (226 ft), divided into the following segments:

- 2.6 kilometres (1.6 mi) north, in Sainte-Agathe-de-Lotbinière, up to Gosford road that it cuts 3.0 kilometres (1.9 mi) south of the center of the village of Sainte-Agathe-de-Lotbinière;
- 2.3 kilometres (1.4 mi) north, passing east of the village of Sainte-Agathe-de-Lotbinière, to a country road;
- 2.3 kilometres (1.4 mi) northwest, to a country road;
- 0 kilometres (0 mi) west, to the municipal limit of Lyster which constitutes the limit between the MRCs of Lotbinière Regional County Municipality and L'Érable Regional County Municipality;
- 3.2 kilometres (2.0 mi) west, to a road in a place called "Le Nordêt";
- 7.4 kilometres (4.6 mi) northwest, crossing a large area of marshes and collecting water from the Bisson-Laflamme stream (coming from the southwest), to route 116;
- 4.0 kilometres (2.5 mi) west, to a road;
- 1.8 kilometres (1.1 mi) north-west, up to the limit of Saint-Janvier-de-Joly;
- 1.3 kilometres (0.81 mi) north-west, to its confluence.

The “Rivière aux Chevreuils” flows on the south bank of the rivière du Chêne, 4.1 kilometres (2.5 mi) (in a direct line) east of the center of the village of Val-Alain.

== Toponymy ==
The toponym "rivière aux Chevreuils" was made official on December 5, 1968, at the Commission de toponymie du Québec.

== See also ==
- List of rivers of Quebec
