= Napoleon Lemay =

Canadian politician from Quebec (1865–1946)

Member of the National Assembly of Quebec for Lotbinière
- In office 1900–1908
- Preceded by: Édouard-Hippolyte Laliberté
- Succeeded by: Joseph-Napoléon Francoeur

Personal details
- Born: November 2, 1865 Sainte-Croix, Quebec
- Died: January 21, 1946 (aged 80) Quebec City, Quebec
- Party: Liberal (after 1904)
- Other political affiliations: Conservative (until 1904)

Napoleon Lemay (November 2, 1865 – January 21, 1946) was a Canadian politician from Quebec. He was a member of the National Assembly of Quebec representing the district of Lotbinière.
