= Édouard-Hippolyte Laliberté =

Canadian politician

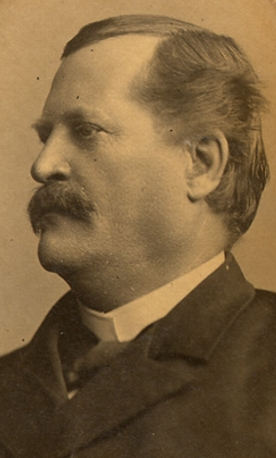

Member of the Legislative Assembly of Quebec for Lotbinière
- In office 1886–1900
- Preceded by: Henri-Gustave Joly de Lotbinière
- Succeeded by: Napoleon Lemay

Personal details
- Born: October 13, 1845 Lotbinière, Canada East
- Died: March 5, 1911 (aged 65) Deschaillons, Quebec
- Party: Liberal

Édouard-Hippolyte Laliberté (October 13, 1845 – March 5, 1911) was a notary and political figure in Quebec. He represented Lotbinière in the Legislative Assembly of Quebec from 1886 to 1900 as a Liberal.

He was born in Lotbinière, Canada East, the son of Joseph Laliberté and Marcelline Lahaye, and was educated at the Collège Faucher there and the Séminaire de Québec. He qualified as a notary in 1873 and set up practice in Warwick, later settling in Deschaillons. Laliberté was married twice: to Marie-Joséphine-Julia Durand in 1873 and to Florentine Côté in 1898. He was first elected to the Quebec assembly in an 1886 by-election held after Henri-Gustave Joly de Lotbinière resigned his seat. After he retired from politics in 1900, he served as Serjeant-at-Arms for the assembly from 1902 to 1911. Laliberté died in Deschaillons at the age of 65.
