= Rodrigue Biron =

Canadian politician (1934–2025)

Member of the National Assembly of Quebec for Lotbinière
- In office 1976–1985
- Preceded by: Georges Massicotte
- Succeeded by: Lewis Camden

Personal details
- Born: September 8, 1934 Sainte-Croix, Quebec, Canada
- Died: August 12, 2025 (aged 90)
- Party: Union Nationale (before); Parti Québécois (after)
- Other political affiliations: Quebec Liberal Party (former)

Rodrigue Biron (French: [ʁɔdʁig biʁɔ̃]; September 8, 1934 – August 12, 2025) was a Canadian politician in Quebec. He was leader of the Union Nationale political party from 1976 to 1980, when he joined the Parti Québécois (PQ). He served as Minister of Industry, Commerce and Tourism in the PQ government.

== Background ==
Biron was manager of his family’s sewer pipe factory in Sainte-Croix, Quebec. He and his wife Huguette Dionne have had three children. His father Paul ran as the Liberal candidate for Lotbinière in the 1958 federal election. Biron's late brother Paul Jr. (1933– 2015) was a perennial candidate in provincial politics who ran under different labels including Parti Québécois in the Lévis riding in 1970 and Parti démocratie chrétienne du Québec, which was renamed Parti Unité Nationale in 2012. Prior to entering provincial politics, Biron had been a card-carrying supporter of the Quebec Liberal Party. He also served as Chair of the federal Liberal Association for Lotbinière in 1962.

Biron died of cancer on August 12, 2025, at the age of 90.

== Mayor ==
Biron served as Mayor of the Town of Sainte-Croix, Quebec, from 1971 to 1973.

== Provincial politics ==
Biron became the leader of the conservative Union Nationale (UN) party on May 23, 1976. The UN had once dominated Quebec provincial politics, but in the 1973 election, it lost all of the seats that it had held in the previous National Assembly. However, the party returned to the National Assembly of Quebec by winning a by-election in 1974.

Biron led the party to a modest comeback in the 1976 election, winning 11 seats. The party won one anglophone riding, where UN candidate William Shaw was elected capitalizing on discontent with Bill 22 language legislation passed by the Liberal government of Robert Bourassa. During his time as the leader, he tried to merge the UN with Jérôme Choquette's Parti national populaire but the merger didn't happen.

The 1976 election had been won by the sovereigntist PQ, however, and the nationalist vote on which the UN had counted for support gravitated toward that party. Biron resigned as Union Nationale leader on March 3, 1980, campaigned in favor of the Yes side in the 1980 Quebec referendum on sovereignty and joined the PQ on November 11 of that year.

In the 1981 election, he was elected as a PQ member of the National Assembly, and served as Minister of Industry, Commerce and Tourism. Meanwhile, his former party, the Union Nationale, was again wiped out in the 1981 election. Unlike the first time, the party never won another seat again and eventually ceased to exist.

The PQ lost the 1985 election, and Biron lost his seat.

== Federal politics ==
In 1997, he unsuccessfully ran for the leadership of the Bloc Québécois, a federal sovereigntist party. When Preston Manning wanted to form the United Alternative, he recruited Biron to the steering committee.

== See also ==
- Politics of Quebec
- History of Quebec
- List of Quebec general elections
- List of third party leaders (Quebec)

Party political offices
Preceded by Maurice Bellemare	Leader of the Union Nationale; 1976-1980	Succeeded by Michel Le Moignan (interim)
