= René Bernatchez =

Member of the National Assembly of Quebec for Lotbinière
- In office July 28, 1948 – March 11, 1970
- Preceded by: Guy Roberge
- Succeeded by: Jean-Louis Béland

Personal details
- Born: October 29, 1913 Montmagny, Quebec
- Died: March 13, 1980 (aged 66) Saint-Flavien, Quebec
- Party: Union Nationale
- Education: Oka Agricultural Institute
- Profession: Agronomist

René Bernatchez (October 29, 1913 – March 13, 1980) was a Canadian agronomist and Quebec politician from the Union Nationale. He was a member of the National Assembly of Quebec for 22 years representing the district of Lotbinière.

== See also ==
- 28th Quebec Legislature
- 27th Quebec Legislature
- 26th Quebec Legislature
- 25th Quebec Legislature
- 24th Quebec Legislature
- 23rd Quebec Legislature
