= Jean-Guy Paré =

Canadian politician

Mayor of Saint-Pierre-les-Becquets
- In office February 5, 2008 – November 14, 2013
- Preceded by: Raymond Dion
- Succeeded by: Yves Tousignant

Member of the National Assembly of Quebec for Lotbinière
- In office September 12, 1994 – April 14, 2003
- Preceded by: Lewis Camden
- Succeeded by: Sylvie Roy

Personal details
- Born: November 24, 1947 (age 78) Warwick, Quebec
- Died: December 26, 2020 (aged 73)
- Party: Parti Québécois
- Profession: Educator

Jean-Guy Paré (November 24, 1947 – December 26, 2020) was a Quebec politician, he was the former Mayor of Saint-Pierre-les-Becquets from 2008 to 2013, he previously served as the member for Lotbinière in the Quebec National Assembly as a member of the Parti Québécois from 1994 until 2003.

== Biography ==
Paré was born in Warwick. He obtained a Bachelor of Education in Physical Education in 1972. Completing his master's degree in Sports Science and Social Psychology, at Dalhousie University in 1976. He obtained a certificate in sports training in from the Université du Québec à Trois-Rivières and obtained a master's degree in Public Administration from the National School of Public Administration.

He served as a professor of physical activity from 1972 to 1984, also serving as Head coach of the Les Diablos football team at Cégep de Trois-Rivières. He later served as executive director of the Training and Development Corporation at the same college and then became a Training services coordinator for various CEGEPs.

== Political career ==
Paré served as a city councillor of Les Becquets from 1979 until 1989. He ran in the 1994 Quebec provincial election for the seat of Lotbinière and won by 283 votes over the incumbent Lewis Camden. He served as a backbench supporter in the government and was re-elected in 1989, he served in various parliamentary secretary roles in the governments of Jacques Parizeau, Lucien Bouchard and Bernard Landry.

He was re-elected easily in 1998. He became chairman of the Committee on Public Finance. He was defeated in the 2003 election by Sylvie Roy of the Action démocratique du Québec.

After losing re-election, he worked as a Senior Counsellor for the Cégeps of Drummondville, Shawinigan, Trois-Rivières and Victoriaville. Before running in the Saint-Pierre-les-Becquets mayoral by-election to replace the late Raymond Dion. Paré won and served out the rest of the term before running un-opposed for re-election. He chose not to run for re-election in 2013.

== Electoral record ==
=== Provincial ===
2003 Quebec general election: Lotbinière
Party	Candidate	Votes	%	±%
Action démocratique	Sylvie Roy	9,522	37.45	+23.00
Liberal	Monique Drolet Glazier	8,773	34.50	-3.41
Parti Québécois	Jean-Guy Paré	6,502	25.57	-22.07
Green	Marc Allard	306	1.20	–
UFP	Étienne Hallé	175	0.69	–
Christian Democracy	Paul Biron	150	0.59	–
Total valid votes		25,428	98.85	
Rejected and declined votes		296	1.15	-0.14
Turnout		25,724	77.57	-3.89
Electors on the lists		33,161		
Source: Official Results, Government of Quebec
Action démocratique gain from Parti Québécois		Swing		+22.54

1998 Quebec general election: Lotbinière
Party	Candidate	Votes	%	±%
Parti Québécois	Jean-Guy Paré	11,496	47.64	+2.08
Liberal	Christian Lessard	9,148	37.91	-6.41
Action démocratique	Claude Carignan	3,486	14.45	–
Total valid votes		24,130	98.71	
Rejected and declined votes		315	1.29	-1.10
Turnout		24,445	81.46	+0.58
Electors on the lists		30,007		
Source: Official Results, Government of Quebec
Parti Québécois hold		Swing		+4.25

1994 Quebec general election: Lotbinière
Party	Candidate	Votes	%	±%
Parti Québécois	Jean-Guy Paré	10,398	45.56	+10.81
Liberal	Lewis Camden	10,115	44.32	-15.53
Independent	Denis Cameron	2,308	10.11	–
Total valid votes		22,821	97.61	
Rejected and declined votes		558	2.39	+0.40
Turnout		23,379	80.88	+2.62
Electors on the lists		28,906		
Source: Official Results, Government of Quebec
Parti Québécois gain from Liberal		Swing		+13.17
