= Saint-Pierre-les-Becquets =

- Municipality
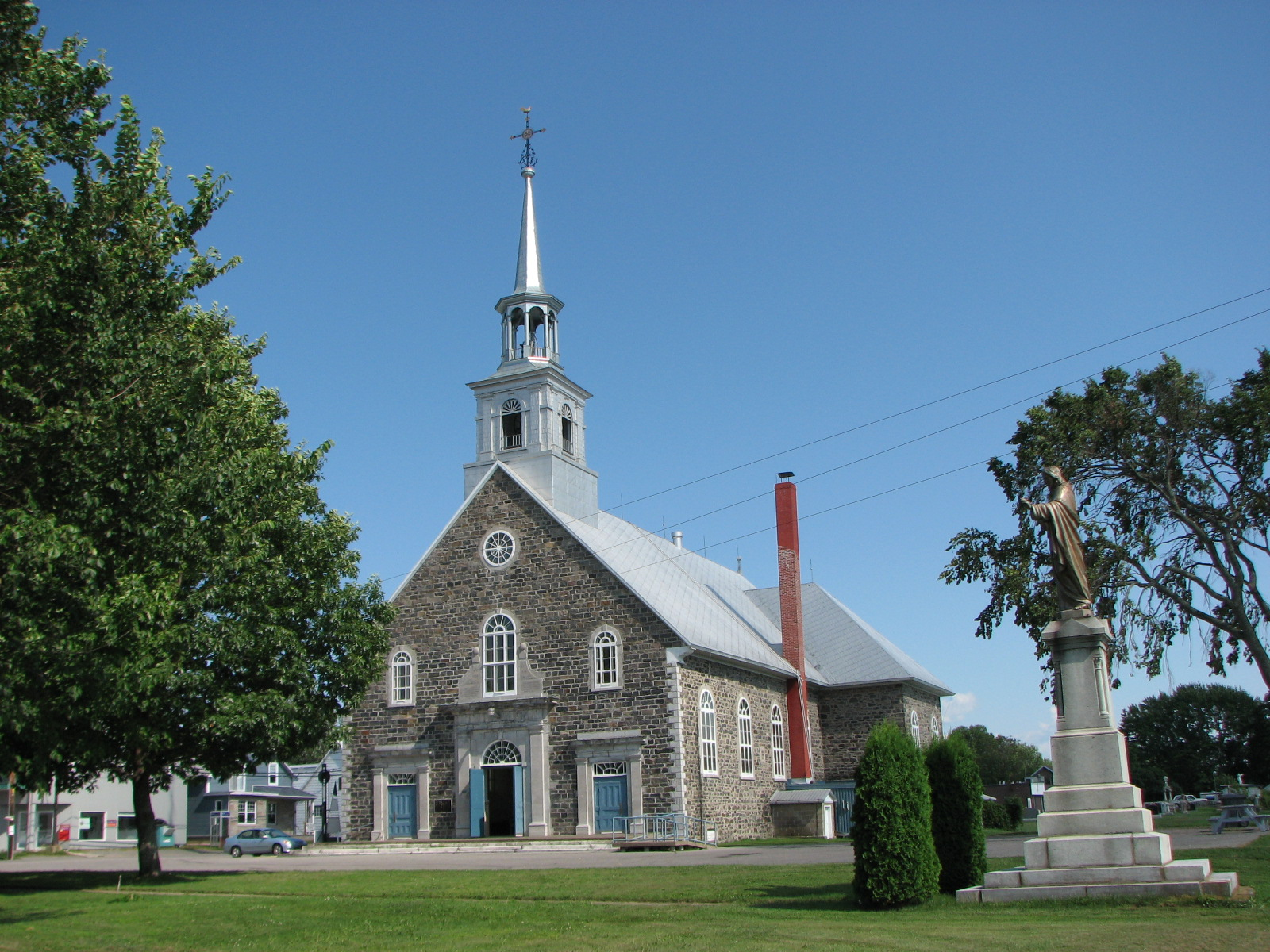

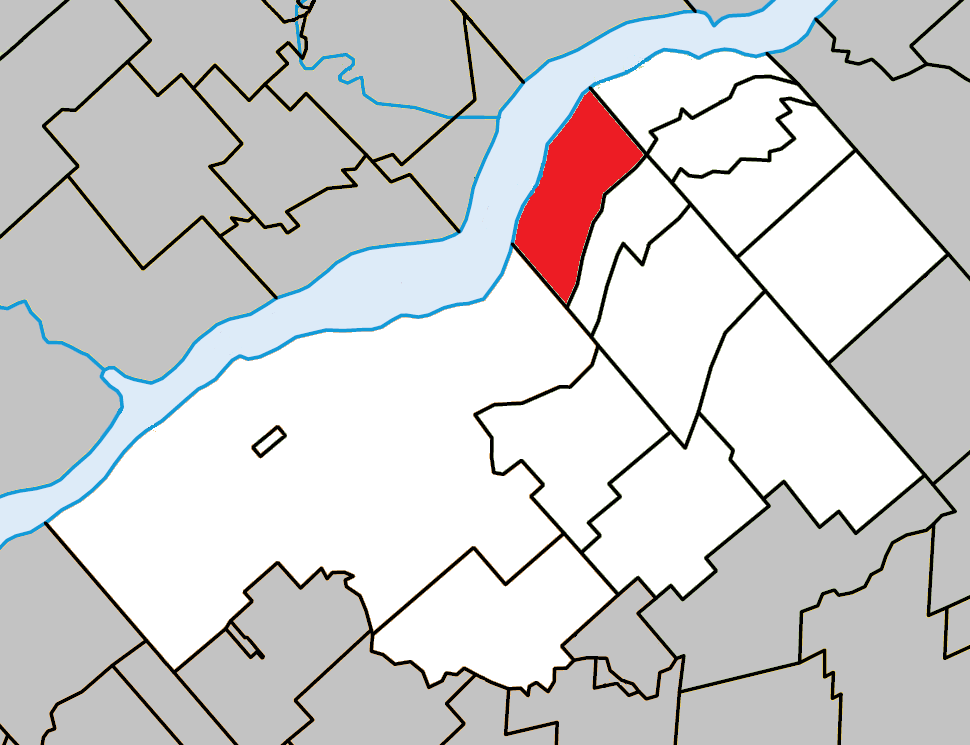
- Location within Bécancour RCM

- Location in southern Quebec
- Coordinates: 46°30′N 72°12′W
- Country: Canada
- Province: Quebec
- Region: Centre-du-Québec
- RCM: Bécancour
- Constituted: 22 February 1986

Government
  - Mayor: François Pépin
  - Federal riding: Bécancour—Nicolet—Saurel—Alnôbak
  - Member: Louis Plamondon (BQ)
  - Provincial riding: Nicolet-Bécancour
  - MNA: Guillaume Langlois (PCQ)

Area (2021)
  - Total: 65.10 km^{2} (25.14 sq mi)
  - Land: 48.14 km^{2} (18.59 sq mi)

Population (2021)
  - Total: 1,183
  - Density: 24.6/km^{2} (64/sq mi)
  - Pop 2016-2021: ▲4.0%
  - Dwellings: 627
- Time zone: UTC−05:00 (EST)
  - Summer (DST): UTC−04:00 (EDT)
- Postal code(s): G0X 2Z0
- Area code: 819
- Highways: R-132; R-218
- Website: www.st-pierre- les-becquets.qc.ca

Saint-Pierre-les-Becquets (French pronunciation: [sɛ̃ pjɛʁ le bekɛ]) is a village municipality located in the Centre-du-Québec region of the province of Quebec, Canada. It is situated on the south shore of the St. Lawrence River, approximately 180 km (110 mi) east-northeast of Montreal and 200 km (120 mi) southwest of Quebec City. The village is part of the Bécancour Regional County Municipality and has a population of 1,183 people according to the 2021 Canadian census.

== History ==
The area where Saint-Pierre-les-Becquets now stands was originally inhabited by the First Nations peoples. The first European to arrive in the area was Jacques Cartier in 1535. The village was founded in 1847 and was originally named Saint-Pierre-de-Becquets, in honour of the Saint Pierre River which flows through the area and to Romain Becquet. It was officially incorporated as a municipality in 1855.

The village is home to several historic buildings and landmarks, including the 19th-century Église de Saint-Pierre-les-Becquets, which was designed by architect Victor Bourgeau and is a National Historic Site of Canada.

In addition to its historical and cultural attractions, Saint-Pierre-les-Becquets is also known for its outdoor recreation opportunities. The village is located close to the Saint Lawrence River, which is used for boating, fishing, and other water sports. The area is also home to several parks and nature reserves, including the Rivière-Gentilly Regional Park, which features hiking and biking trails, picnic areas, and campsites.

Saint-Pierre-les-Becquets is a predominantly French-speaking community, and many residents are involved in agriculture and other rural industries. The village is home to several local businesses, including a hardware store, a grocery store, and a pharmacy, as well as a community centre and a library.

== Demographics ==
In the 2021 Canadian census conducted by Statistics Canada, Saint-Pierre-les-Becquets had a population of 1,183 living in 533 of its 627 total private dwellings, a change of 4% from its 2016 population of 1,137. With a land area of 48.14 km^{2} (18.59 sq mi), it had a population density of 24.6/km^{2} (63.6/sq mi) in 2021.

== Notable people ==
Jean-Guy Paré, former National Assembly of Quebec member for Lotbinière, served as mayor from 2008 to 2013.

Julien Dubuque was born on January 10, 1762, in the area now known as Saint-Pierre-les-Becquets. He was a French-Canadian fur trader and lead miner who became the first permanent European settler in Iowa founding the town of Dubuque.

== See also ==
- List of municipalities in Quebec
