= Guy Roberge =

Canadian politician

- Born: January 26, 1915; Saint-Ferdinand, Quebec, Canada
- Died: June 21, 1991 (aged 76)
- Education: Petit Séminaire de Québec, Université Laval
- Occupations: journalist, lawyer, politician, civil servant
- Known for: National Film Board of Canada
- Awards: Canadian Film Award

Guy Roberge (January 26, 1915 – June 21, 1991) was a Canadian journalist, lawyer, politician and civil servant. He also served as Canada's Government Film Commissioner during the 1950s and 60s, in which capacity he ran the National Film Board of Canada. He was the first French Canadian to occupy this role.

He was born in Saint-Ferdinand, Quebec, and grew up in Inverness. He studied at Petit Séminaire de Québec, and then went on to graduate with a degree in law from Université Laval. Following his graduation in 1937, Roberge initially pursued a career not in law but in journalism, working for Le Soleil and L'Événement newspapers. However, in 1940 he switched to practising law, specialising in corporate law and authors' rights. During this period of his career he also served as an adviser to the Royal Commission on National Development in the Arts, Letters and Sciences (also known as the "Massey Report").

He entered politics in the 1944 Quebec general election, when he was elected to the Legislative Assembly of Quebec for the Liberal party in Lotbinière. He lost his bid for re-election in 1948. From 1954 to 1955 he was the President of the Quebec branch of the Canadian Institute of International Affairs.

Roberge had been responsible for co-writing a chapter of the Massey Report which dealt with Canadian film, and also served on the Board of Governors of the National Film Board. The NFB began to experience difficulties during the 1950s due to dissatisfaction from many of its French Canadian staff regarding the treatment and status both of themselves and of French language films. When a new Government Film Commissioner was needed to run the NFB in 1957, Roberge's appointment as the first French Canadian to hold the position helped to ease these political tensions, with his appointment being particularly welcomed by the Quebec newspaper Le Devoir.

Under Roberge's time in control of the NFB, two of its longest-running series came to an end; Eye Witness and Canada Carries On. He also initiated new series such as Candid Eye and Panoramique. During the early 1960s, Roberge was responsible for ensuring with the Canadian government that, as government employees, the NFB film-makers' desire to create a trade union was actually legal. When Roberge had ensured that it was allowed, the Association professionnelle des cinéastes and the Society of Film Makers were established by NFB staff in 1962. The same year, Roberge began to initiate co-production arrangements with NFB counterparts in France and the United Kingdom.

Later in the 1960s, Roberge began to feel that there was a need for a Canadian film body that was independent from both the NFB and the Canadian Broadcasting Corporation (CBC) to provide backing for the country's film-makers. He took his ideas to the government, and this new organisation eventually emerged as the Canadian Film Development Corporation in 1967. By this time, Roberge was no longer in Canada: he resigned from his position at the NFB in March 1966. He had hoped to become the new President of the CBC, but when this role was not offered to him he accepted an invitation from Premier of Quebec Jean Lesage to become Quebec's new Agent-General to London, effectively the province's ambassador to the United Kingdom.

In 1966, Roberge was given a Canadian Film Award to mark his contribution to the country's film industry.

National Assembly of Quebec
| Preceded by René Chaloult (Liberal) | MLA for Lotbinière; 1944–1948 | Succeeded by René Bernatchez (Union Nationale) |
Cultural offices
| Preceded by Albert Trueman | Government Film Commissioner and Chairperson of the National Film Board of Canada; 1957-1966 | Succeeded by Grant McLean (interim) |
