= Jean-Louis Béland =

Canadian politician

Jean-Louis Béland was a politician in Quebec, Canada and a Member of the National Assembly of Quebec (MNA). He was born in Saint-Gilles, Quebec on November 27, 1932.

== School board member ==
Prior to serving in Quebec's legislature, he served as a school board member in Saint-Gilles from 1965 to 1968.

== Member of the legislature ==
Béland ran as a candidate of the Ralliement créditiste in 1970 and won, becoming the Member of the National Assembly for the provincial district of Lotbinière.

During his term of office, the party was plagued by internal divisions. While three MNAs remained loyal to Leader Camil Samson, Béland and the rest of the caucus withdrew their support and appointed Armand Bois as temporary leader, until a leadership convention could determine a new leader.

Eventually, the Samson faction rejoined the party and Yvon Dupuis was chosen as leader. Nonetheless, Béland was defeated and finished second in 1973.

== Mayor ==
He served as Mayor of Saint-Gilles from 1975 to 1977.

== See also ==
- History of Quebec

== Footnotes ==
National Assembly of Quebec
| Preceded by René Bernatchez (Union Nationale) | MNA for Lotbinière; 1970–1973 | Succeeded by Georges Massicotte (Liberal) |
