= Romain Becquet =

Canadian lawyer

Romain Becquet (c. 1640 – April 20, 1682) was active in a variety of legal capacities in Quebec during his working life.

Becquet was born in France, the son of a surgeon, probably arrived in New France in 1661 and he was married for the first time at Quebec in 1677. Records show he was granted a seigneury, Saint-Pierre-les-Becquets, in 1672.

Romain was in the profession of notary from 1665 and, shortly after, the intendant Talon made him a court officer and sergeant. In 1678, Bishop François de Laval requested that he become judge of the county of Saint-Laurents (Île d’Orléans) and of the shore of Beaupré. He produced the first registry of the land belonging to the seigneury. The bishop, who was the first Roman Catholic bishop of New France and was one of the most influential men of his day, also made him clerk of his officiality.

Becquet's work on the land registry as survived to the present time. It is located in the judicial Archives of Quebec and is one of the most important of its kind for the study of 17th-century Quebec.
