= Armagh River =

River in Chaudière-Appalaches, Quebec (Canada)

- Location within Quebec
- Native name: Rivière Filkars (French)

Location
- Country: Canada
- Province: Quebec
- Administrative region: Chaudière-Appalaches
- RCM: Lotbinière Regional County Municipality

Physical characteristics
- Source: Forested streams
  - location: Sainte-Agathe-de-Lotbinière
  - coordinates: 46.338925°N 71.383566°W
  - elevation: 226 metres (741 ft)
- Mouth: Filkars River
  - location: Sainte-Agathe-de-Lotbinière)
  - coordinates: 46.338925°N 71.383566°W
  - elevation: 167 metres (548 ft)
- Length: 7.7 kilometres (4.8 mi)

Basin features
- Progression: Filkars River, Beaurivage River, Chaudière River, St. Lawrence
- Tributaries
  - left: (upstream)
  - right: (upstream)

The Armagh River (in French: rivière Armagh) is a tributary of the Filkars River which flows on the south bank of the Beaurivage River whose current flows successively on the west bank of the Chaudière River and on the south shore of the St. Lawrence River. It flows in the municipality of Sainte-Agathe-de-Lotbinière, in the Lotbinière Regional County Municipality, in the administrative region of Chaudière-Appalaches, in Quebec, in Canada.

== Geography ==
The main neighboring watersheds of the River Armagh are:

- north side: rivière du Chêne, Henri River, Beaurivage River;
- east side: Beaurivage River, Chaudière River;
- south side: Bécancour River, Palmer River, Saint-André River;
- west side: Bécancour River.

The Armagh River has its source in the municipality of Sainte-Agathe-de-Lotbinière at 4.6 kilometres (2.9 mi) south of the village. This headland is located 0.8 kilometres (0.50 mi) north of the Palmer River, east of the source of the Rivière aux Chevreuils and 2.2 kilometres (1.4 mi) northwest of the municipal boundary of Saint-Jacques-de-Leeds.

From its source, the Armagh River flows on 7.7 kilometres (4.8 mi) divided into the following segments:

- 3.3 kilometres (2.1 mi) north, curving west, to route 271 which it intersects at 2.8 kilometres (1.7 mi) south-east of the village of Sainte-Agathe-de-Lotbinière;
- 4.1 kilometres (2.5 mi) north-east, to a country road;
- 0.3 kilometres (0.19 mi) towards the northeast, up to its confluence.

The Armagh River empties on the east bank of the Filkars River at 4.8 kilometres (3.0 mi) east of the village center of Sainte-Agathe-de-Lotbinière.

== Toponymy ==
The toponym Rivière Armagh was formalized on October 16, 1983 at the Commission de toponymie du Québec.

== See also ==
- List of rivers of Quebec
