= Georges Massicotte =

Canadian politician (1930–2020)

Mayor of Saint-Agapitville
- In office 1975 – May 27, 1979

Member of the National Assembly of Quebec for Lotbinière
- In office 1973–1976
- Preceded by: Jean-Louis Béland
- Succeeded by: Rodrigue Biron

Personal details
- Born: January 23, 1930 Saint-Prosper, Quebec, Canada
- Died: November 3, 2020 (aged 90)
- Party: Quebec Liberal Party
- Profession: Educator

Georges J.P. Massicotte (January 23, 1930 – November 3, 2020) was a Canadian politician from the province of Quebec. He served as a member of the Quebec National Assembly for Lotbinière as a member of the Quebec Liberal Party from 1973 until 1976.
