= Quebec Route 269 =

Highway in Quebec, Canada

Route 269

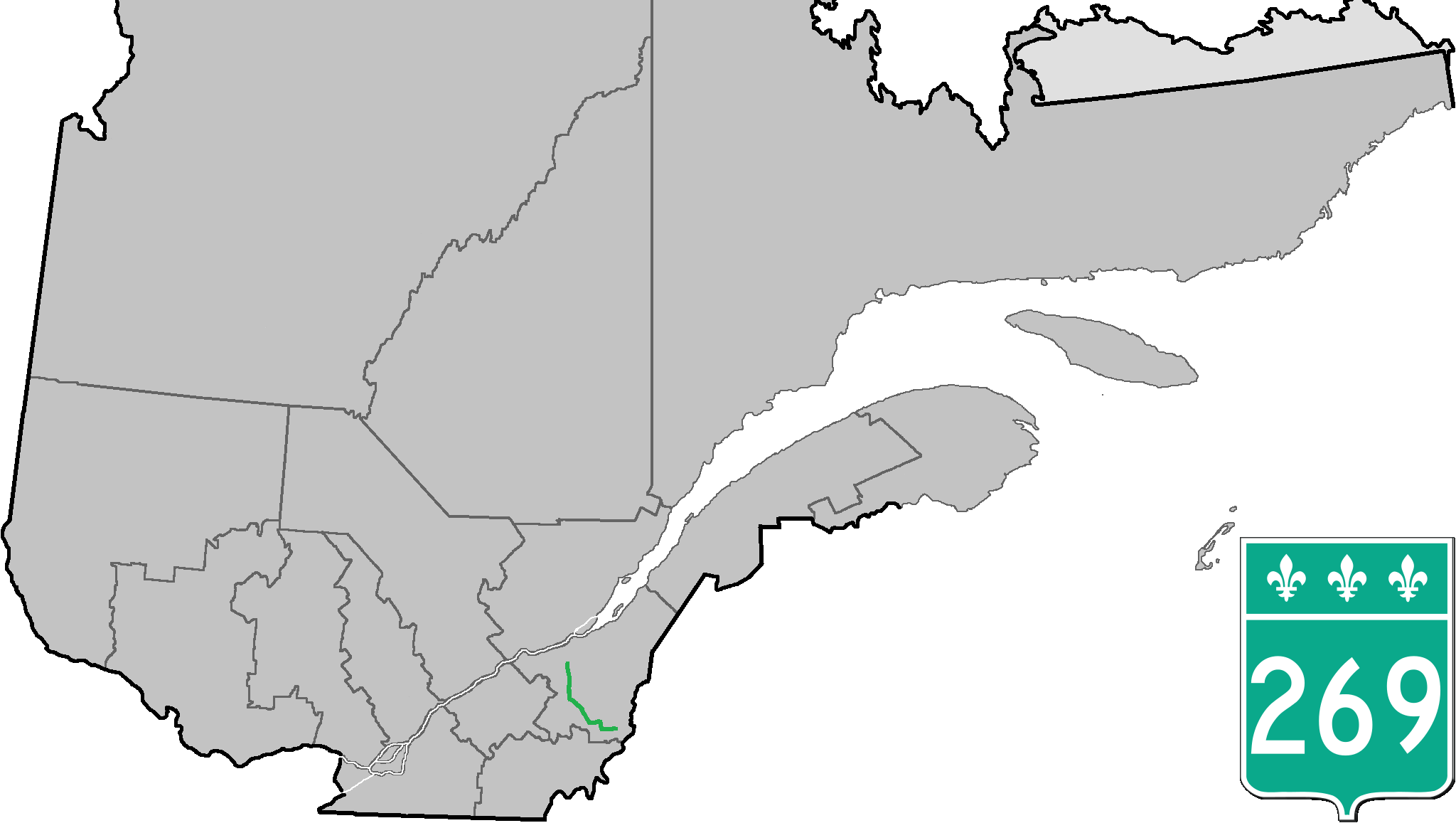

Route information
- Length: 138 km (86 mi)

Major junctions
- South end: R-173 in Saint-Théophile
- R-112 in Thetford Mines; R-108 in La Guadeloupe; R-204 in Saint-Martin
- North end: R-116 east of Saint-Agapit

Location
- Country: Canada
- Province: Quebec
- Major cities: Thetford Mines, Saint-Gilles

Highway system
- Quebec provincial highways; Autoroutes; List; Former
← R-267	→ R-271

Route 269 is a two-lane north-south highway on the south shore of the Saint Lawrence River, in Quebec, Canada. Its northern terminus is close to Saint-Gilles at the junction of Route 116, and the southern terminus is at the junction of Route 173 in Armstrong, part of Saint-Théophile. The stretch between Saint-Gilles and Kinnear's Mills is very scenic, rising and dipping in the Appalachians.

== List of towns along Route 269 ==
- Saint-Gilles
- Saint-Patrice-de-Beaurivage
- Saint-Sylvestre
- Saint-Jacques-de-Leeds
- Kinnear's Mills
- Thetford Mines
- Adstock
- Saint-Éphrem-de-Beauce
- La Guadeloupe
- Saint-Honoré-de-Shenley
- Saint-Martin
- Saint-Gédéon-de-Beauce
- Saint-Théophile
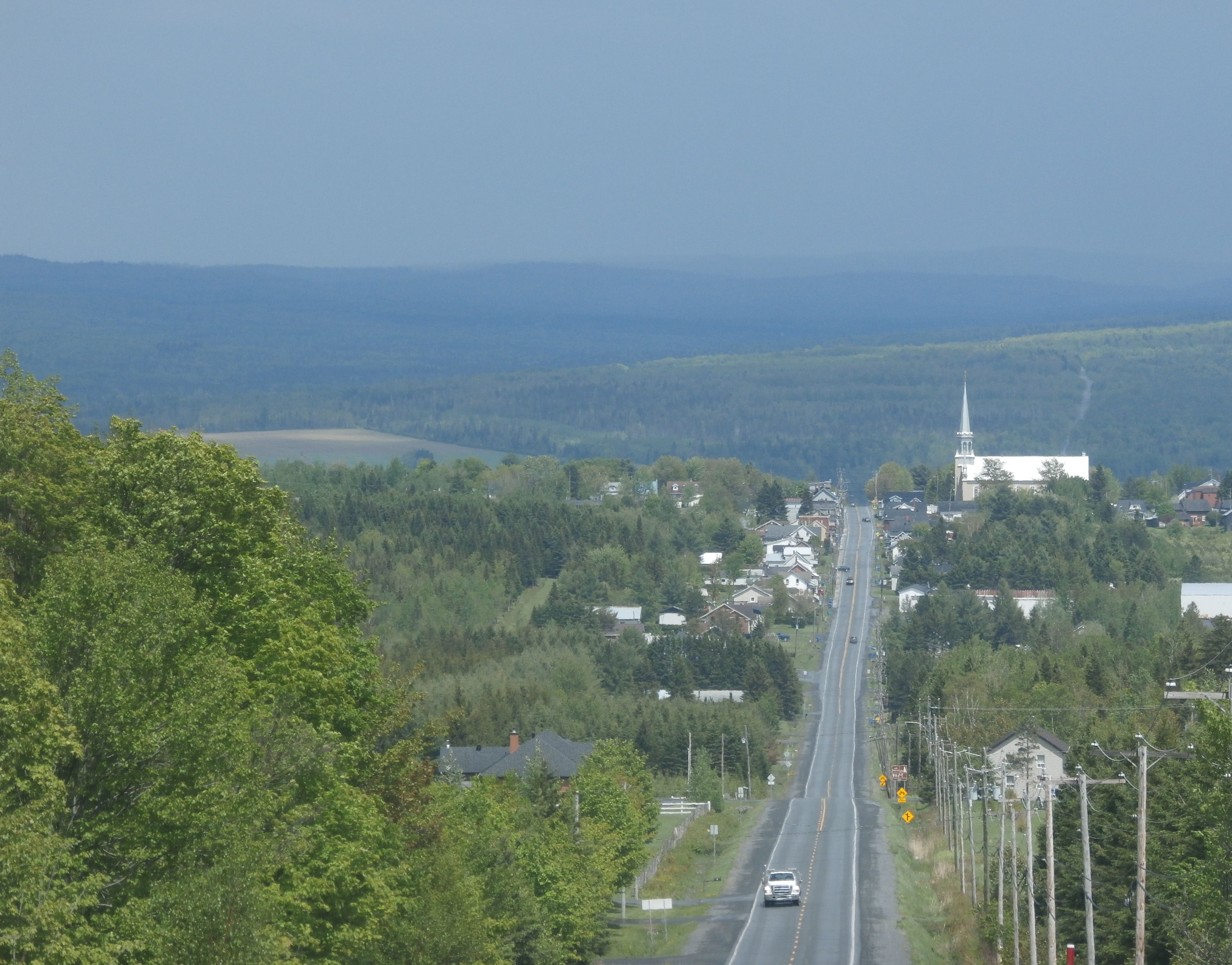
Route 269 between Saint-Gédéon-de-Beauce and Saint-Théophile.

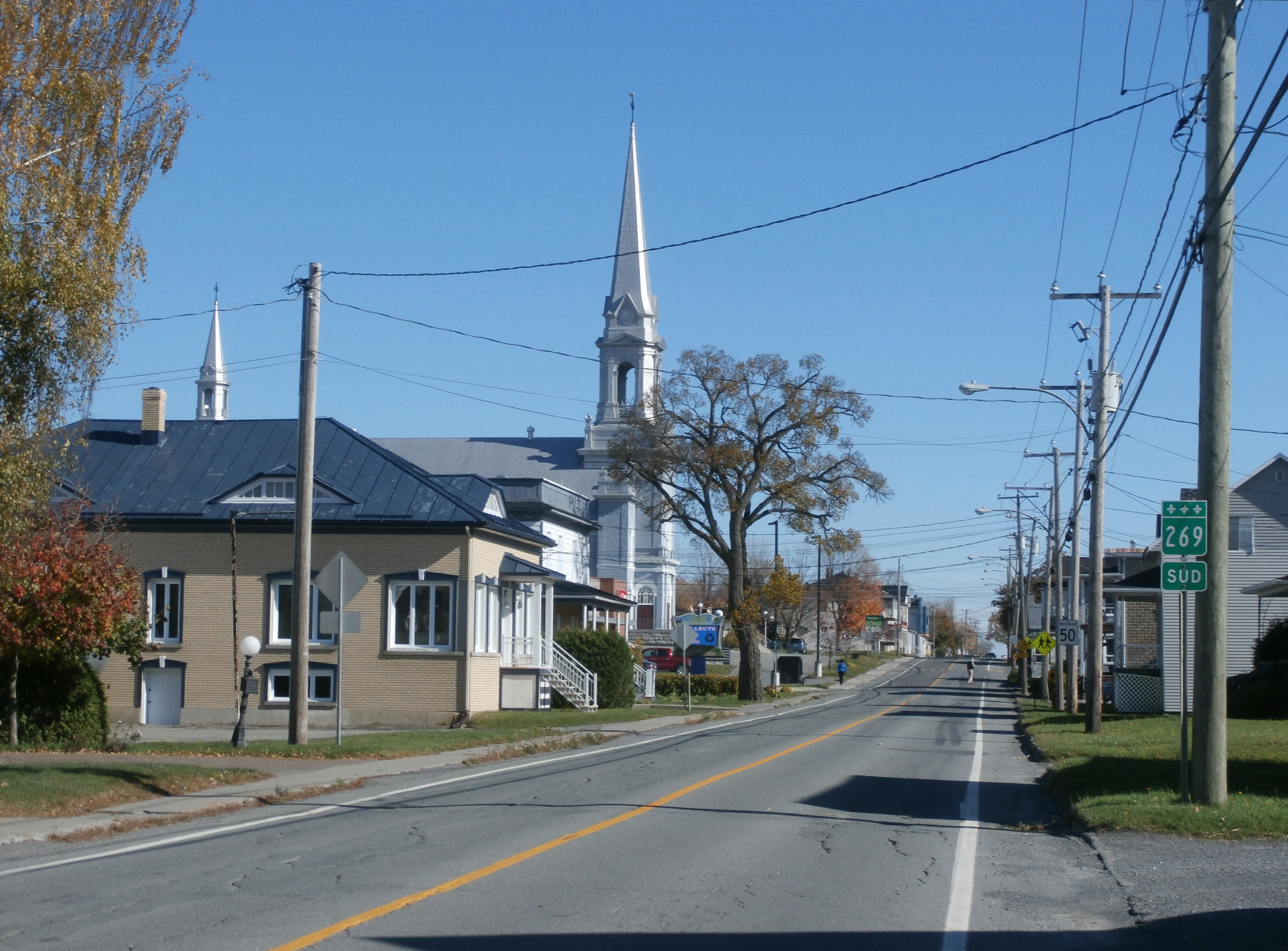
Route 269 in Saint-Honoré-de-Shenley.

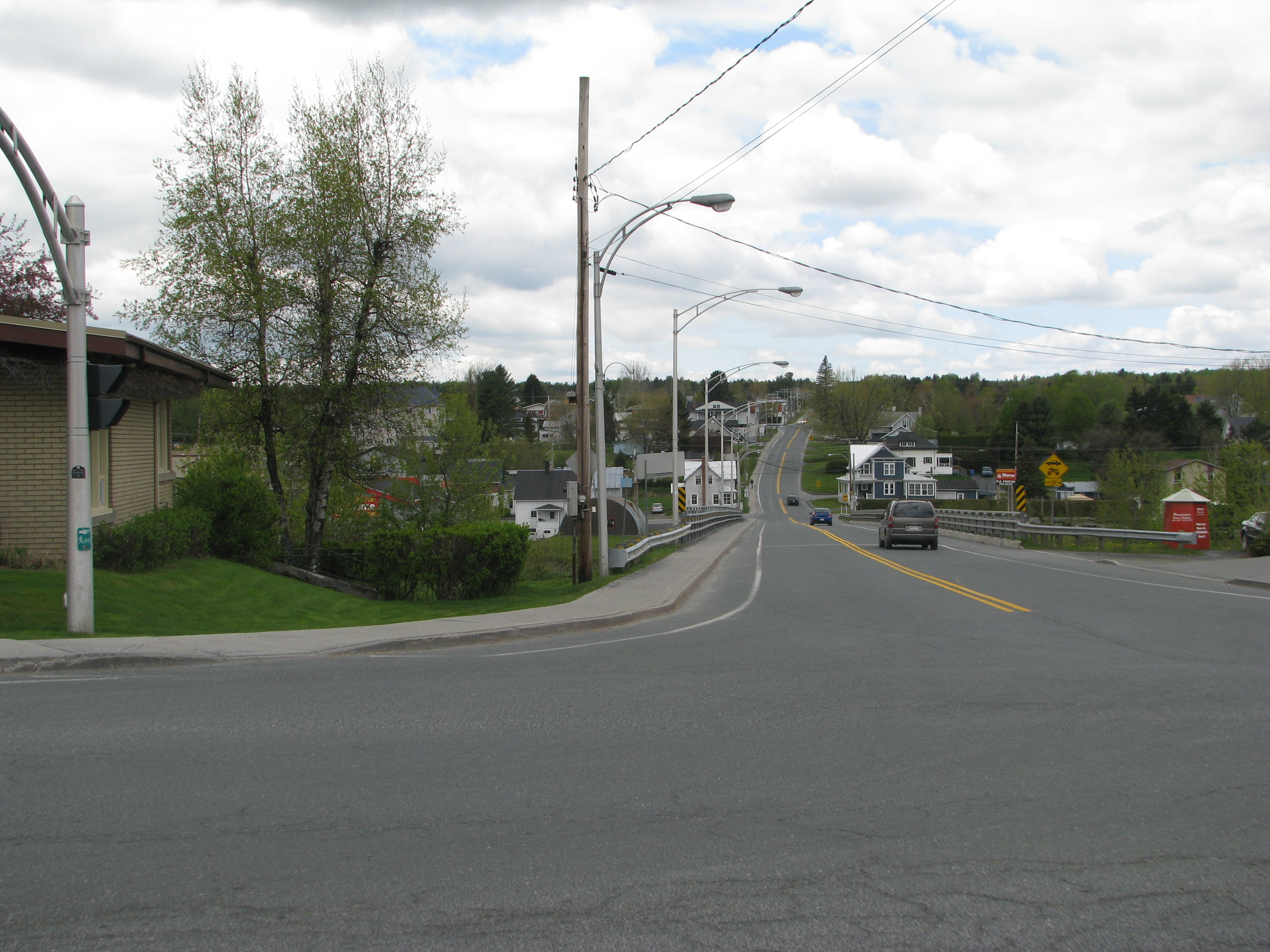
Pont avenue (Route 269) in Saint-Martin.

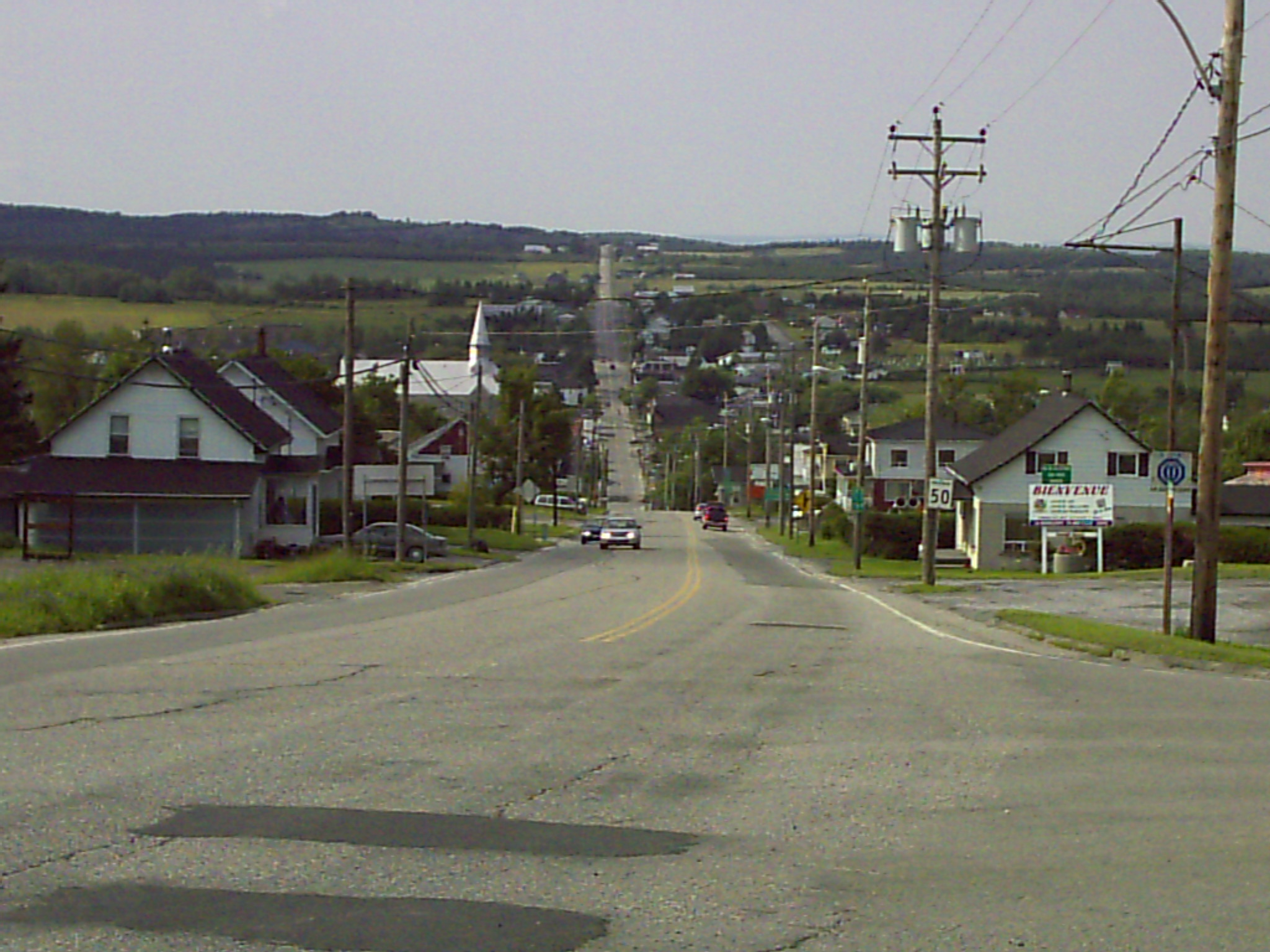
Routes 108 and 269 in La Guadeloupe.

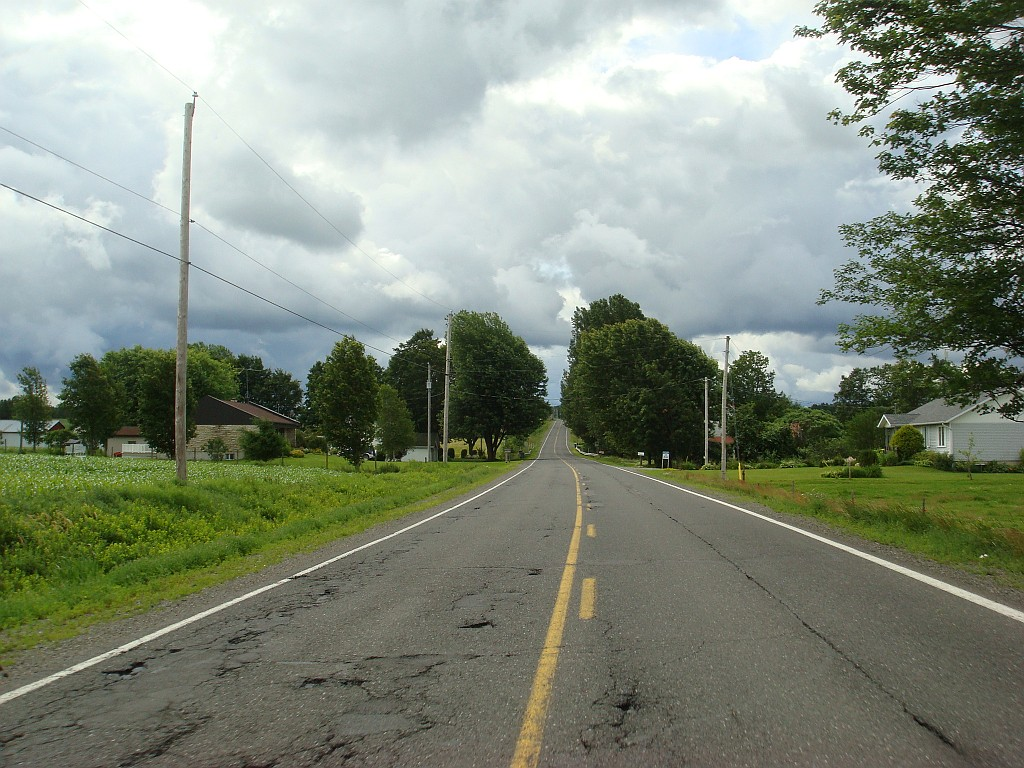
Quebec Route 269 in Saint-Jacques-de-Leeds

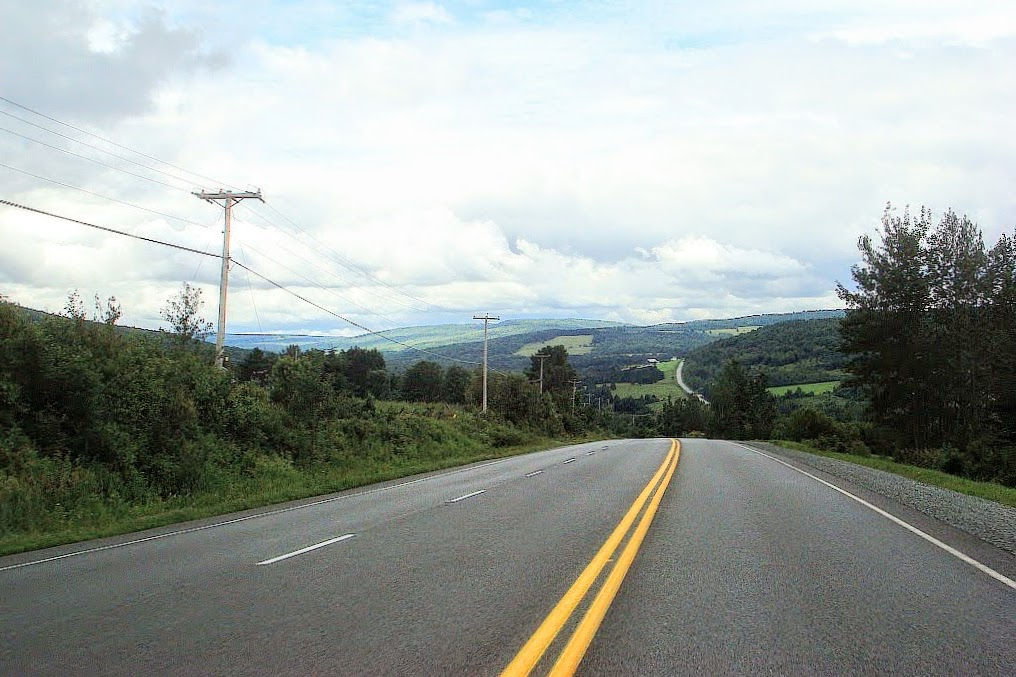
Routes 216 and 269 in Saint-Jacques-de-Leeds.

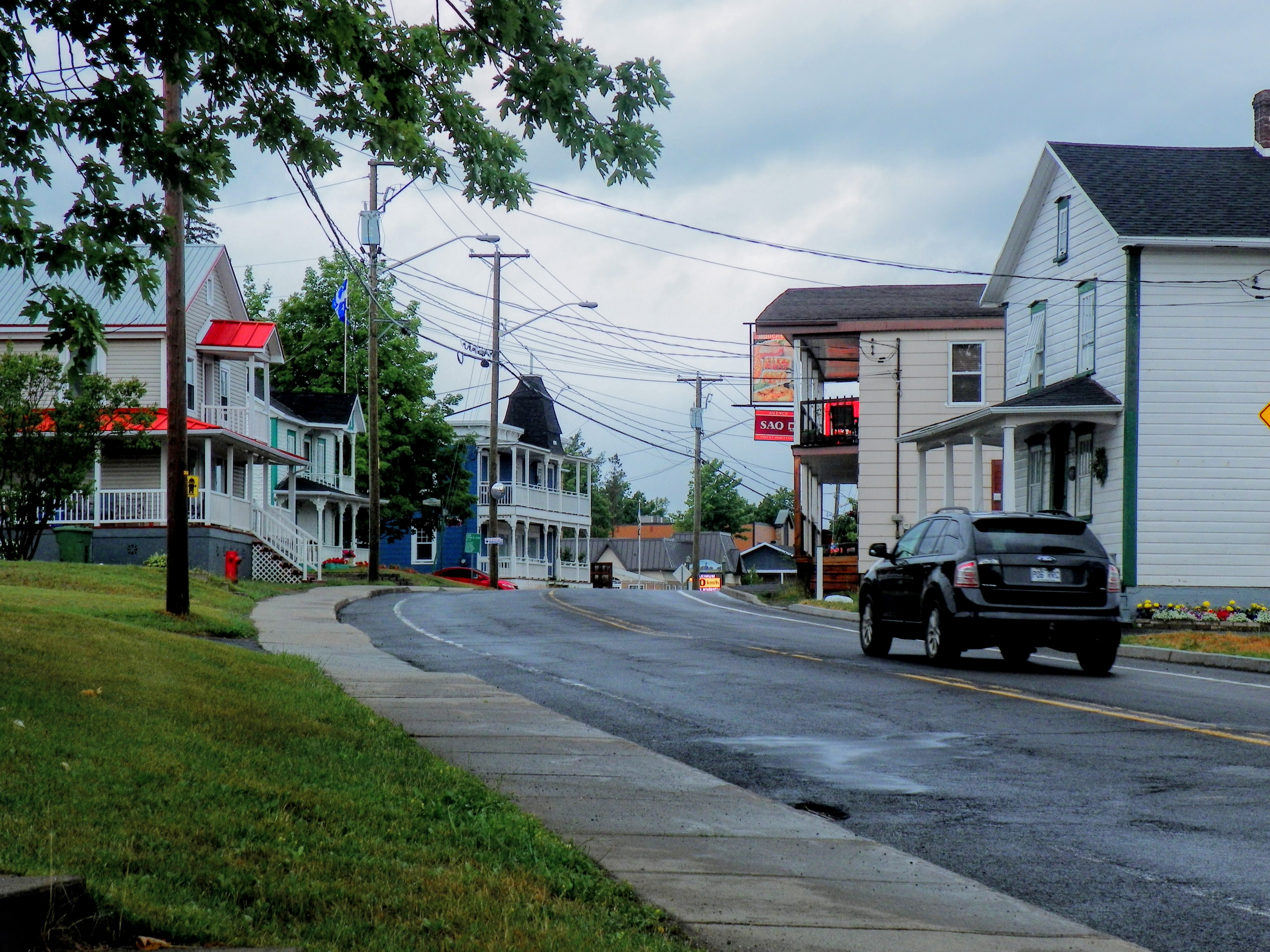
Principale street (Routes 218 and 269) in Saint-Gilles.

== See also ==
- List of Quebec provincial highways
