= Saint-Sylvestre, Quebec =

Saint-Sylvestre
- Municipality
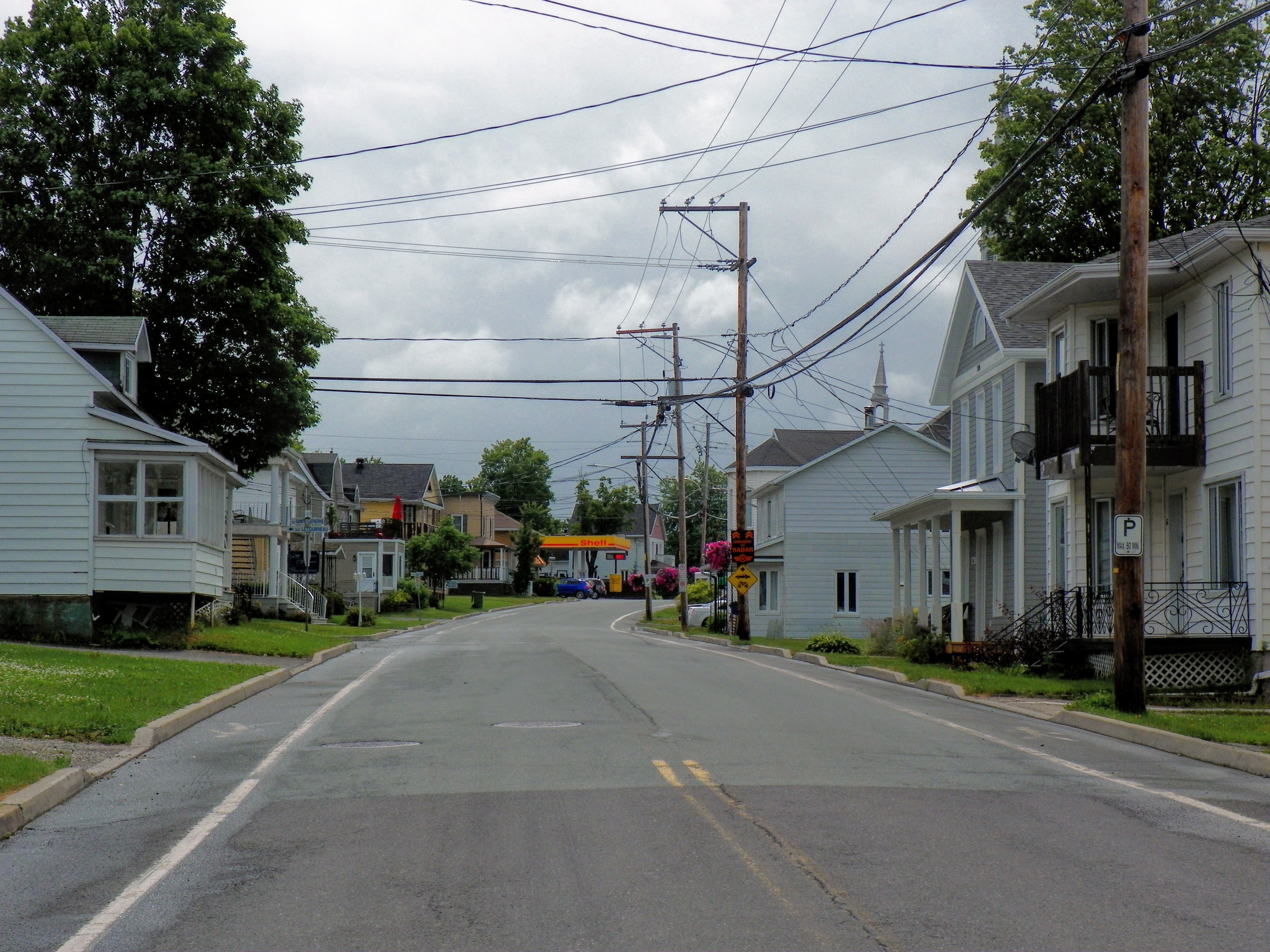
- Principale street (route 216).

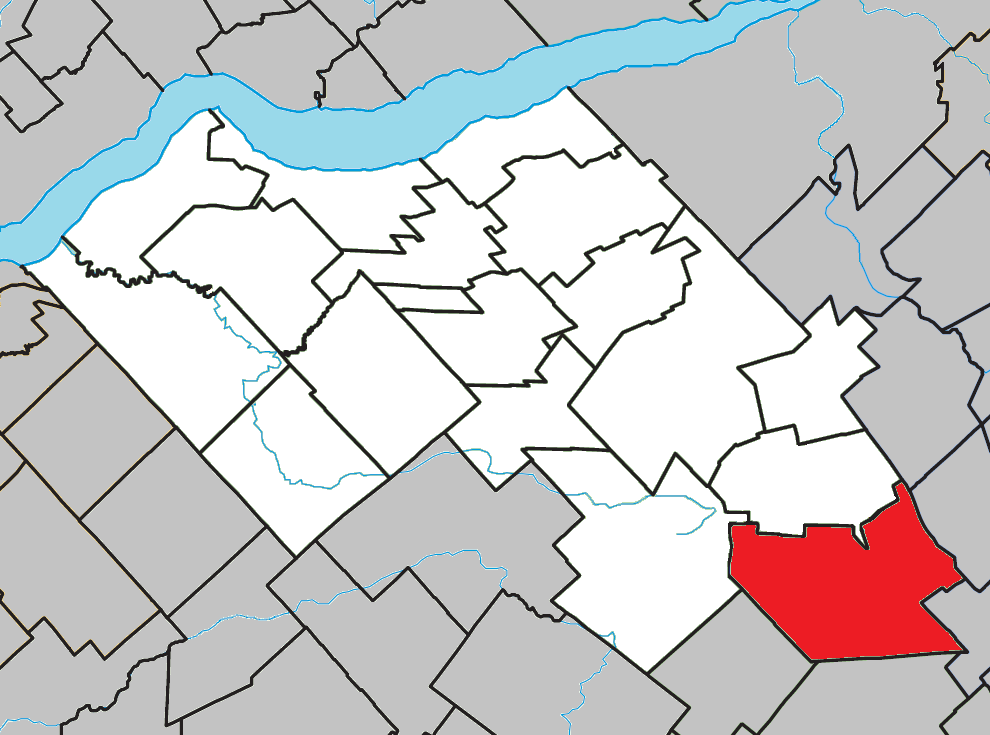
- Location within Lotbinière RCM.

- Location in southern Quebec.
- Coordinates: 46°22′N 71°14′W
- Country: Canada
- Province: Quebec
- Region: Chaudière-Appalaches
- RCM: Lotbinière
- Constituted: December 4, 1996

Government
  - Mayor: Nancy Lehoux
  - Federal riding: Lévis—Lotbinière
  - Prov. riding: Lotbinière-Frontenac

Area
  - Total: 148.10 km^{2} (57.18 sq mi)
  - Land: 147.15 km^{2} (56.81 sq mi)

Population (2021)
  - Total: 1,019
  - Density: 6.9/km^{2} (18/sq mi)
  - Pop 2016-2021: 0.0%
  - Dwellings: 488
- Time zone: UTC−5 (EST)
  - Summer (DST): UTC−4 (EDT)
- Postal code(s): G0S 3C0
- Area codes: 418 and 581
- Highways: R-216; R-269
- Website: www.ville. saint-sylvestre.qc.ca

Saint-Sylvestre (French pronunciation: [sɛ̃ silvɛstʁ]) is a municipality in the Lotbinière Regional County Municipality, in Quebec, Canada. It is part of the Chaudière-Appalaches region and had a population is 1,019 as of 2019. It is named after Pope Sylvester I.

== History ==
=== "Miracles" ===
In 1948-1949, the Bélanger family of Saint-Sylvestre found fame in performing "healing miracles." Visitors from Canada and the United States came to be cured by one of the four Bélanger children, aged 8 to 12. The children allegedly acquired healing powers after they had seen their deceased sisters dressed like angels and escorted by the Holy Virgin.

Visitors would leave money to the children for their curing deeds, and they received the support of Reverend Emile Bourassa, from neighbouring Saint-Patrice-de-Beaurivage. The priest of Saint-Sylvestre, Reverend Edmond Pelletier, preached against the "miracles," and in 1949, Archbishop Maurice Roy, in the name of the Archdiocese of Quebec, ruled the affair as a hoax. The Bélanger home soon closed to visitors soon afterward.

== Geography ==
=== Climate ===
Climate data for Saint-Sylvestre, Quebec: (1981–2010 normals)
Month	Jan	Feb	Mar	Apr	May	Jun	Jul	Aug	Sep	Oct	Nov	Dec	Year
Record high °C (°F)	15.0 (59.0)	16.5 (61.7)	18.9 (66.0)	28.0 (82.4)	31.1 (88.0)	33.0 (91.4)	32.5 (90.5)	33.3 (91.9)	32.5 (90.5)	27.0 (80.6)	21.0 (69.8)	15.5 (59.9)	33.3 (91.9)
Mean daily maximum °C (°F)	−7.4 (18.7)	−4.5 (23.9)	0.6 (33.1)	8.5 (47.3)	16.3 (61.3)	21.2 (70.2)	23.1 (73.6)	22.0 (71.6)	17.4 (63.3)	10.2 (50.4)	3.3 (37.9)	−3.5 (25.7)	8.9 (48.1)
Daily mean °C (°F)	−12.5 (9.5)	−9.9 (14.2)	−4.7 (23.5)	3.3 (37.9)	10.4 (50.7)	15.5 (59.9)	17.8 (64.0)	16.7 (62.1)	12.2 (54.0)	5.7 (42.3)	−0.6 (30.9)	−7.9 (17.8)	3.8 (38.9)
Mean daily minimum °C (°F)	−17.6 (0.3)	−15.2 (4.6)	−9.9 (14.2)	−1.8 (28.8)	4.4 (39.9)	9.7 (49.5)	12.3 (54.1)	11.3 (52.3)	6.9 (44.4)	1.2 (34.2)	−4.4 (24.1)	−12.3 (9.9)	−1.3 (29.7)
Record low °C (°F)	−37.5 (−35.5)	−38.0 (−36.4)	−36.0 (−32.8)	−22.0 (−7.6)	−8.9 (16.0)	−3.5 (25.7)	0.5 (32.9)	0.5 (32.9)	−8.5 (16.7)	−11.0 (12.2)	−26.1 (−15.0)	−36.0 (−32.8)	−38.0 (−36.4)
Average precipitation mm (inches)	77.6 (3.06)	68.7 (2.70)	80.3 (3.16)	85.2 (3.35)	96.6 (3.80)	120.9 (4.76)	137.0 (5.39)	133.3 (5.25)	101.3 (3.99)	107.4 (4.23)	99.3 (3.91)	99.9 (3.93)	1,207.5 (47.53)
Average snowfall cm (inches)	57.3 (22.6)	54.3 (21.4)	47.2 (18.6)	19.4 (7.6)	1.7 (0.7)	0.0 (0.0)	0.0 (0.0)	0.0 (0.0)	0.0 (0.0)	6.6 (2.6)	32.3 (12.7)	69.1 (27.2)	287.9 (113.4)
Average precipitation days (≥ 0.2 mm)	18.6	14.6	15.3	14.2	16.3	16.4	17.2	16.0	16.2	17.8	18.5	19.3	200.4
Average snowy days (≥ 0.2 cm)	17.4	13.0	10.6	4.1	0.4	0.0	0.0	0.0	0.0	1.4	9.1	16.8	72.8
Source: Environment Canada

== Demographics ==
Population trend:

- Population in 2021: 1,019 (2016 to 2021 population change: 0%)
- Population in 2016: 1,019
- Population in 2011: 1,035
- Population in 2006: 973
- Population in 2001: 935

== Infrastructure ==
=== Royal Canadian Air Force Station St. Sylvestre ===
From 1953 to 1964, Saint-Sylvestre hosted a Pinetree Line radar station on Mont Saint-Marguerite, just five miles southeast of the village. Construction started in 1952, and the station opened on 15 September 1953, as RCAF Station Ste-Marie. It was renamed RCAF Station St. Sylvestre in 1955 and closed in 1964.
