= Sainte-Agathe-de-Lotbinière =

- Municipality
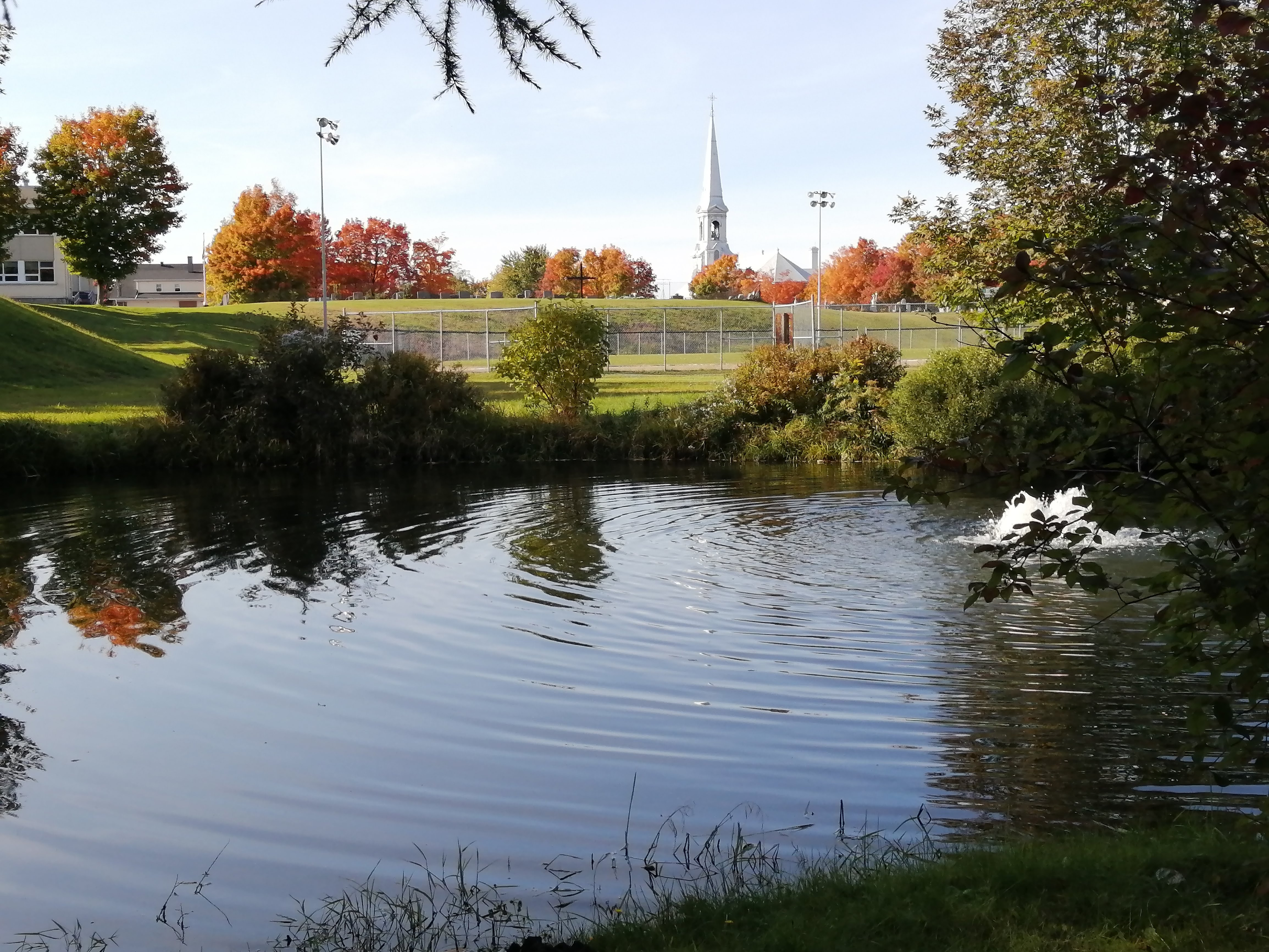
- View of church

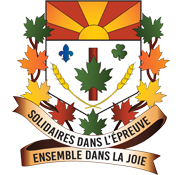

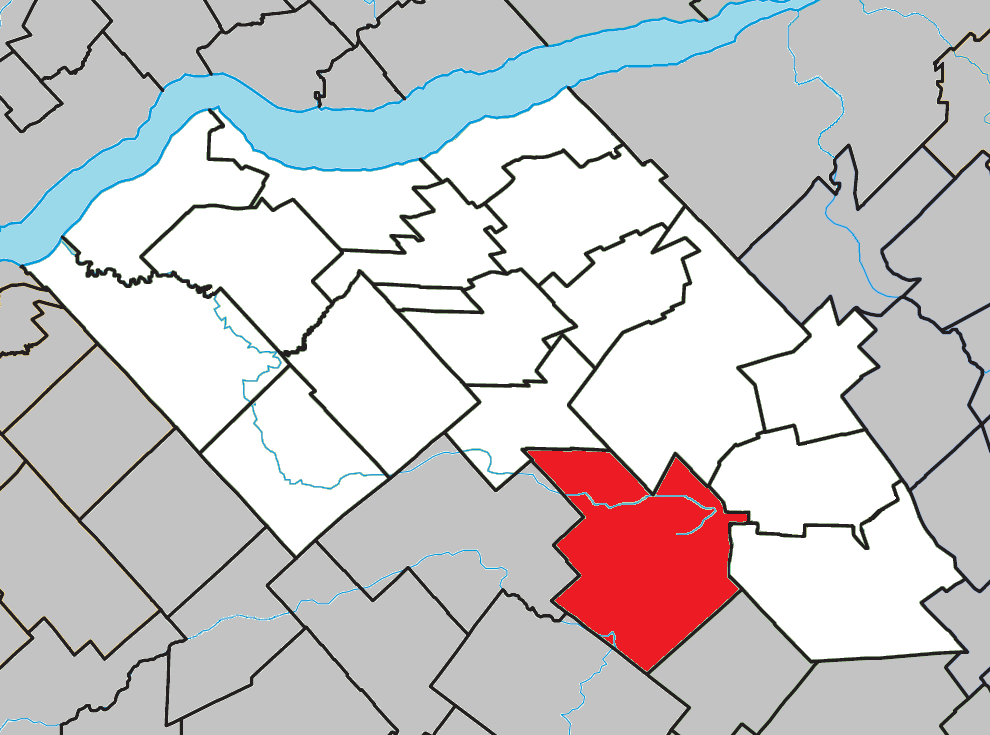
- Location within Lotbinière RCM.

- Location in southern Quebec.
- Coordinates: 46°23′N 71°25′W
- Country: Canada
- Province: Quebec
- Region: Chaudière-Appalaches
- RCM: Lotbinière
- Constituted: February 3, 1999

Government
  - Mayor: Bertrand Lambert
  - Federal riding: Mégantic—L'Érable—Lotbinière
  - Prov. riding: Lotbinière-Frontenac

Area
  - Total: 166.70 km^{2} (64.36 sq mi)
  - Land: 166.99 km^{2} (64.48 sq mi)
- There is an apparent contradiction between two authoritative sources

Population (2021)
  - Total: 1,049
  - Density: 6.3/km^{2} (16/sq mi)
  - Pop 2016–2021: ▼10.2%
  - Dwellings: 515
- Time zone: UTC−5 (EST)
  - Summer (DST): UTC−4 (EDT)
- Postal code(s): G0S 2A0
- Area codes: 418 and 581
- Highways: R-218; R-271
- Website: www.steagathedelotbiniere.com

Sainte-Agathe-de-Lotbinière (French pronunciation: [sɛ̃t aɡat də lɔtbinjɛʁ]) is a municipality in the Lotbinière Regional County Municipality in Chaudière-Appalaches, Quebec, Canada. It had a population of 1,049 as of 2021. The municipality comprises a central village and agricultural land covering the rest of the area. Historically, these two areas constituted two separate municipalities: the parish of Sainte-Agathe and the village of Sainte-Agathe. They were merged during a wave of municipal amalgamations on 3 February 1999 to form the current municipality.

It is named after Agatha of Sicily, who died as a martyr in 251.

== History ==
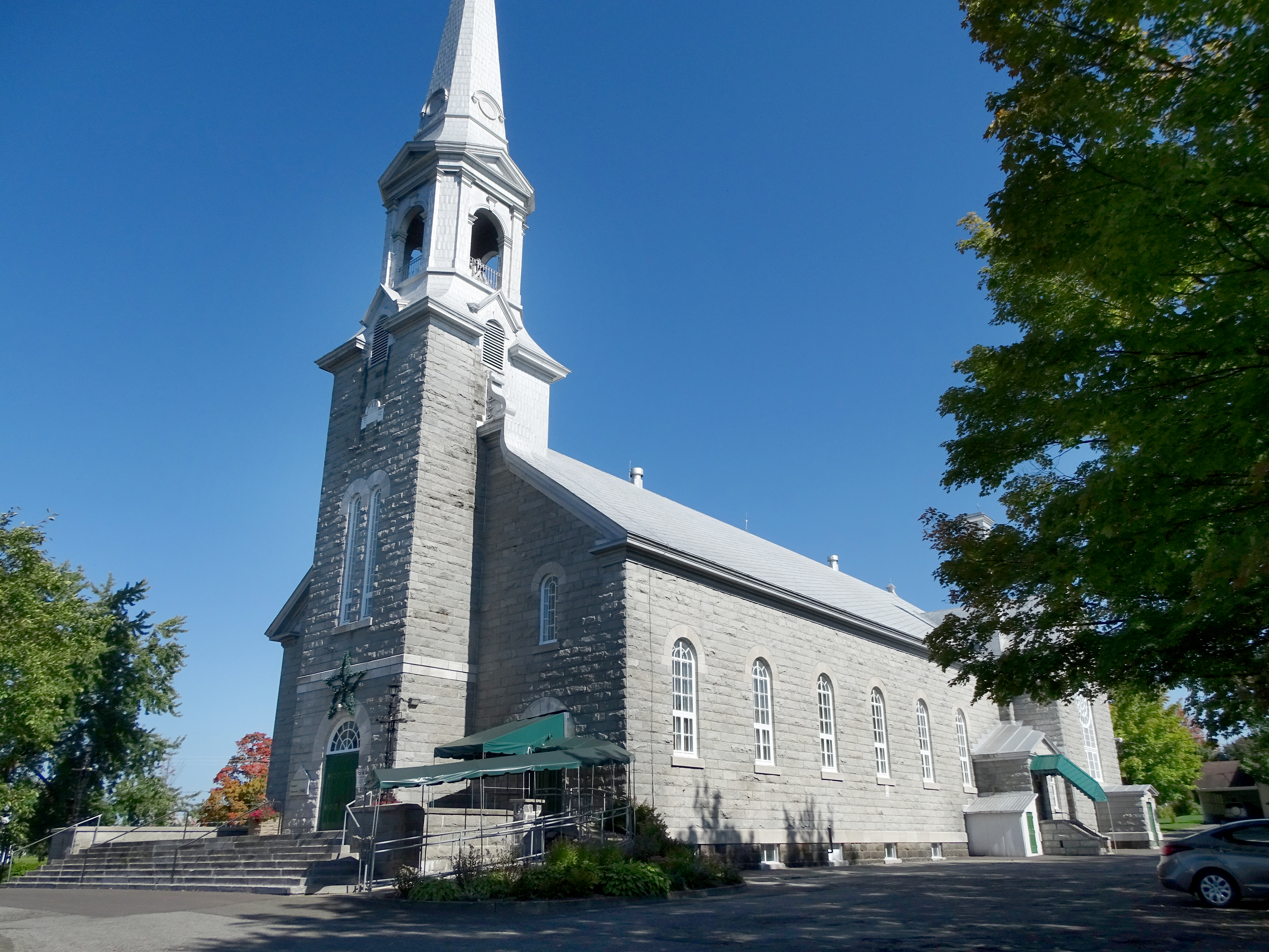
Sainte-Agathe Church

The initial development of Sainte-Agathe-de-Lotbinière is linked to the construction of the chemins Craig and Gosford Roads in the mid-19th century.

The first road constructed within the lands was Craig Road (now Quebec Route 269), which was named after James Henry Craig, who was the governor. The construction of the road started in August 1810, and in 1811, people could make the Quebec-Boston trip in winter only since in the summer the road was too bumpy.

It is from that road that the first road leading to the territory that would form the Sainte-Agathe was built. The road was named either Harvey Hill or Chemin des Mines for a long time, because it started from the Harvey Hill mine, located south of Craig Road. This road passed through Craig to get to Ste-Agathe. Although the new constitution dates from 1743, following the amalgamation of the village and parish of Sainte-Agathe, the territory was opened to settlers in 1830.

This road was opened to prospectors to allow them to find deposits of copper or other metals. In those years, many prospections in the surrounding areas had the aim to find important deposits. It was all abandoned and the Harvey Hill mine closed permanently in 1899.

After the construction of this road, settlers settled in the area and practiced agriculture.

It was mostly Irish people who settled along the road.

Sometime later, another road opened, Gosford Road, which was made to link the Townships of Nelson, Inverness, Halifax, Wolfton, Ham, Weedon, Westbury and Ascot to Quebec City.

In those moments, the territory that would come to form the parishes of Sainte-Agathe already had 63 families for 522 total individuals, of which 219 spoke French, and 303 spoke English. There were 1,763 acres under cultivation.

It is only some time later that there would be a road to Methot's Mill (Dosquet). It was the only location where people could receive merchandise and travel by train. There were pathways in the forest that made it possible to travel by foot or by horse but not by car. It was in 1862 that construction began. The total cost was 41 pounds and 16 shillings, which were obtained from the government through MP Mr. H. Joly.

The parishes of Sainte-Agathe were merged in 1999.

== Geography ==
Sainte-Agathe-de-Lotbinière's territory, located at the foot of the Appalachian Mountains, is crossed by small water streams and presents a predominantly agricultural and forestry character. The territory mainly grows a mixed forest and is part of the hemiborated climatic zone.

The municipality covers 167.04 km squared of surface area, which is about 10% of the Lotbinière MRC territory.

In terms of distance, the citizens need to travel 30 km to get to the autoroute 20 highway at Laurier-Station and they are located at 45 minutes from Quebec City, 30 minutes from Sainte-Marie-de-Beauce and from Thetford Mines, the main surrounding cities.

=== Climate ===
Climate data for Sainte-Agathe-de-Lotbinière
Month	Jan	Feb	Mar	Apr	May	Jun	Jul	Aug	Sep	Oct	Nov	Dec	Year
Record high °C (°F)	13.5 (56.3)	13.5 (56.3)	17.2 (63.0)	30.5 (86.9)	33.8 (92.8)	34.0 (93.2)	34.5 (94.1)	34.4 (93.9)	33.0 (91.4)	27.2 (81.0)	22.5 (72.5)	15.5 (59.9)	34.5 (94.1)
Mean daily maximum °C (°F)	−7.4 (18.7)	−5.0 (23.0)	0.6 (33.1)	9.0 (48.2)	17.3 (63.1)	22.4 (72.3)	24.7 (76.5)	23.7 (74.7)	18.7 (65.7)	11.3 (52.3)	3.8 (38.8)	−3.7 (25.3)	9.6 (49.3)
Daily mean °C (°F)	−12.7 (9.1)	−10.5 (13.1)	−4.7 (23.5)	3.8 (38.8)	11.1 (52.0)	16.3 (61.3)	18.9 (66.0)	17.8 (64.0)	13.1 (55.6)	6.5 (43.7)	−0.1 (31.8)	−8.1 (17.4)	4.3 (39.7)
Mean daily minimum °C (°F)	−17.9 (−0.2)	−16.0 (3.2)	−10.0 (14.0)	−1.5 (29.3)	4.8 (40.6)	10.2 (50.4)	13.1 (55.6)	11.9 (53.4)	7.5 (45.5)	1.7 (35.1)	−4.1 (24.6)	−12.4 (9.7)	−1.1 (30.0)
Record low °C (°F)	−41.0 (−41.8)	−38.5 (−37.3)	−36.5 (−33.7)	−20.0 (−4.0)	−7.8 (18.0)	−3.0 (26.6)	2.0 (35.6)	−1.0 (30.2)	−6.0 (21.2)	−12.2 (10.0)	−28.0 (−18.4)	−38.5 (−37.3)	−41.0 (−41.8)
Average precipitation mm (inches)	90.3 (3.56)	68.1 (2.68)	73.7 (2.90)	89.1 (3.51)	92.3 (3.63)	120.6 (4.75)	121.4 (4.78)	109.8 (4.32)	109.9 (4.33)	97.5 (3.84)	91.1 (3.59)	97.3 (3.83)	1,161.1 (45.71)
Average rainfall mm (inches)	27.3 (1.07)	14.5 (0.57)	29.0 (1.14)	71.8 (2.83)	91.2 (3.59)	120.6 (4.75)	121.4 (4.78)	109.8 (4.32)	109.9 (4.33)	94.8 (3.73)	66.2 (2.61)	33.0 (1.30)	889.5 (35.02)
Average snowfall cm (inches)	63.0 (24.8)	53.5 (21.1)	44.8 (17.6)	17.6 (6.9)	1.1 (0.4)	0 (0)	0 (0)	0 (0)	0 (0)	2.7 (1.1)	24.9 (9.8)	64.4 (25.4)	272.0 (107.1)
Source: Environment Canada based from the Saint-Flavien station

== Demography ==
=== Population ===
Canada census – Sainte-Agathe-de-Lotbinière community profile

	2021	2016	2011
Population	1,049 (-10.2% from 2016)	1,168 (+2.0% from 2011)	1,145 (-4.7% from 2006)
Land area	166.99 km^{2} (64.48 sq mi)	166.99 km^{2} (64.48 sq mi)	166.16 km^{2} (64.15 sq mi)
Population density	6.3/km^{2} (16/sq mi)	7.0/km^{2} (18/sq mi)	6.9/km^{2} (18/sq mi)
Median age	50.4 (M: 50.0, F: 51.2)	47.7 (M: 46.5, F: 49.3)	45.2 (M: 42.6, F: 47.3)
Private dwellings	515 (total)	536 (total)	494 (total)
Median household income	$62,000	$52,992	$52,503

References: 2021 2016 2011

Historical population

Year	Pop.	±%
2001	1,238	—
2006	1,202	−2.9%
2011	1,145	−4.7%

Year	Pop.	±%
2016	1,168	+2.0%
2021	1,049	−10.2%

== Picture gallery ==
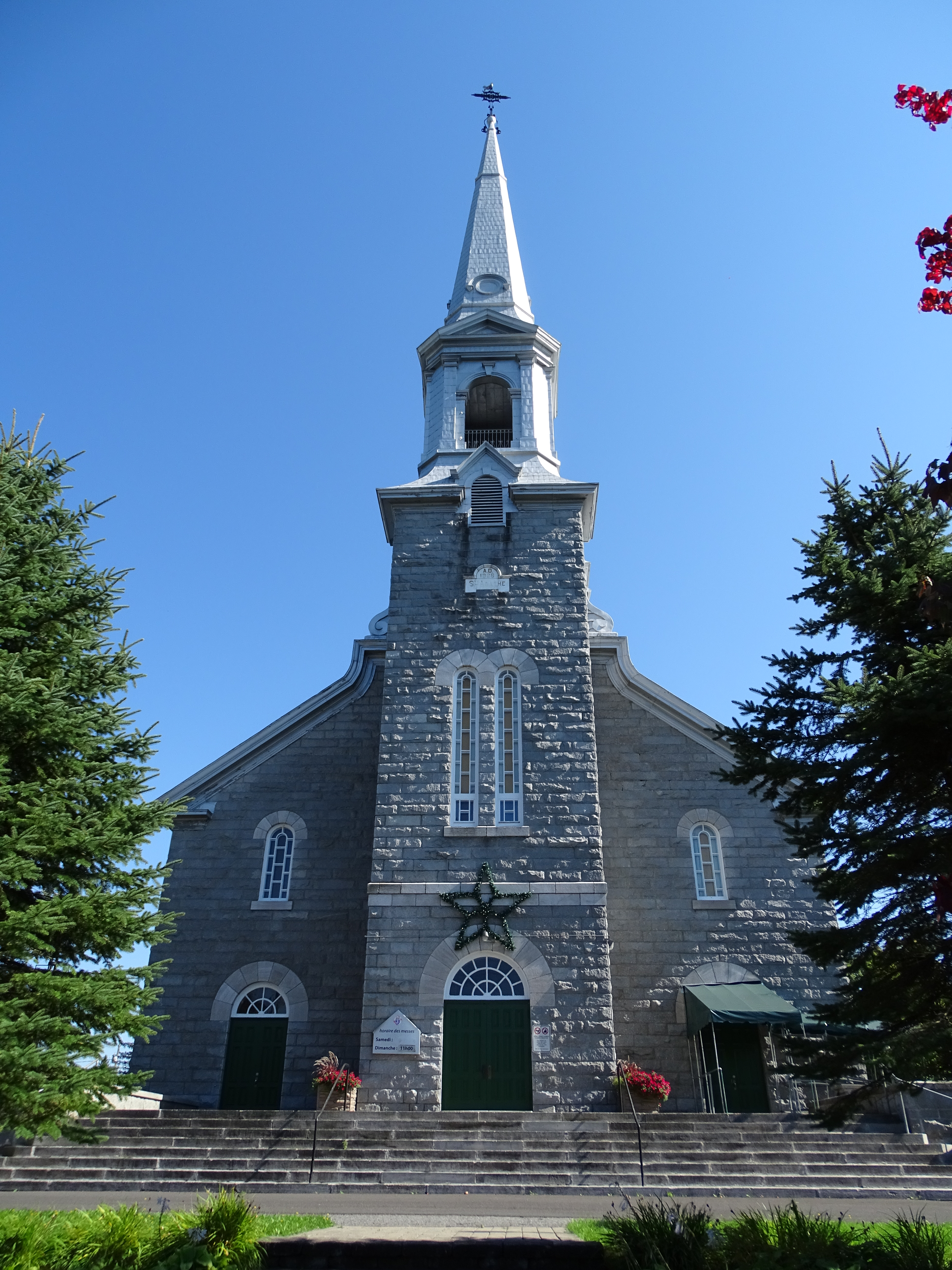
Sainte-Agathe Church

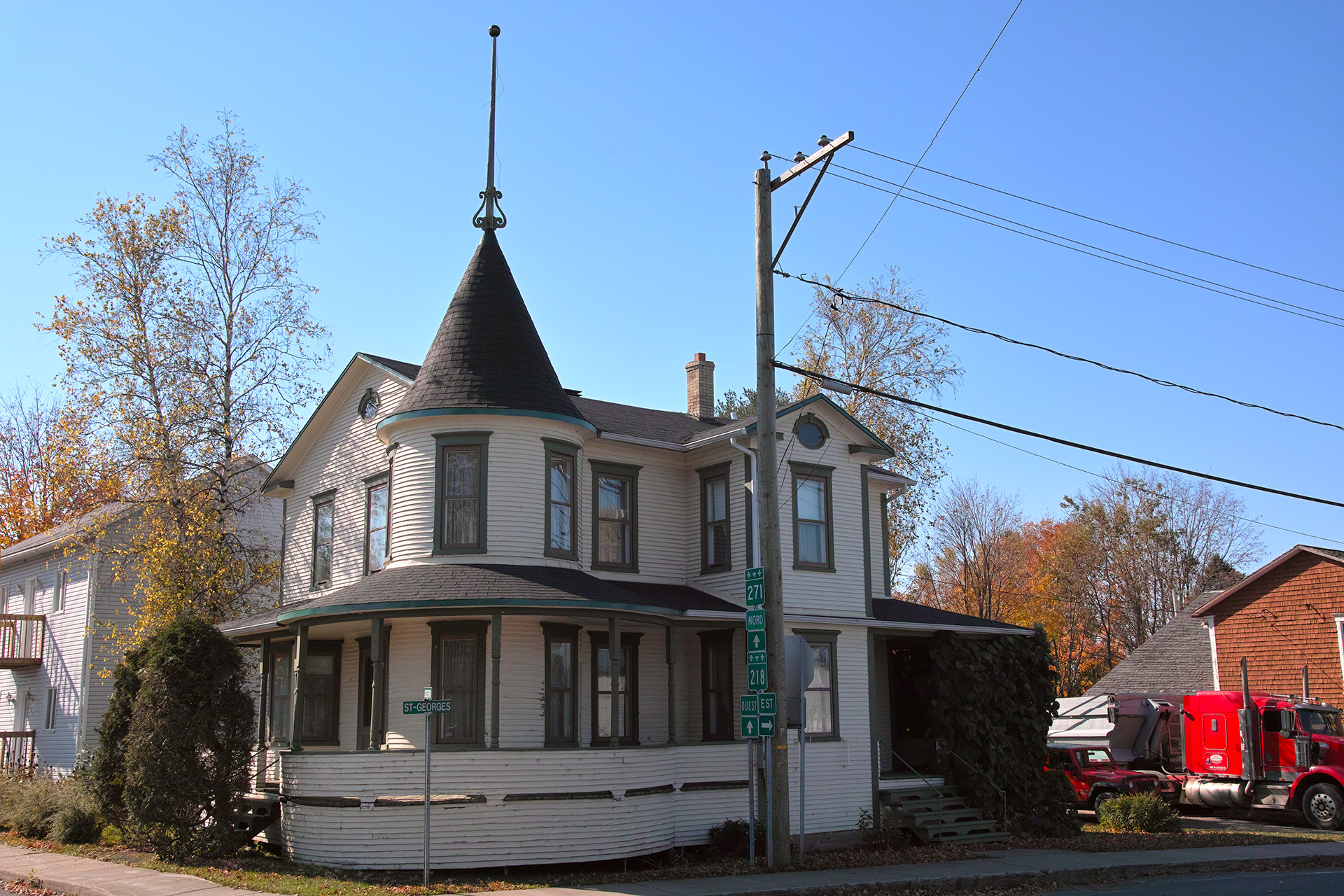
Louis-Dumont House

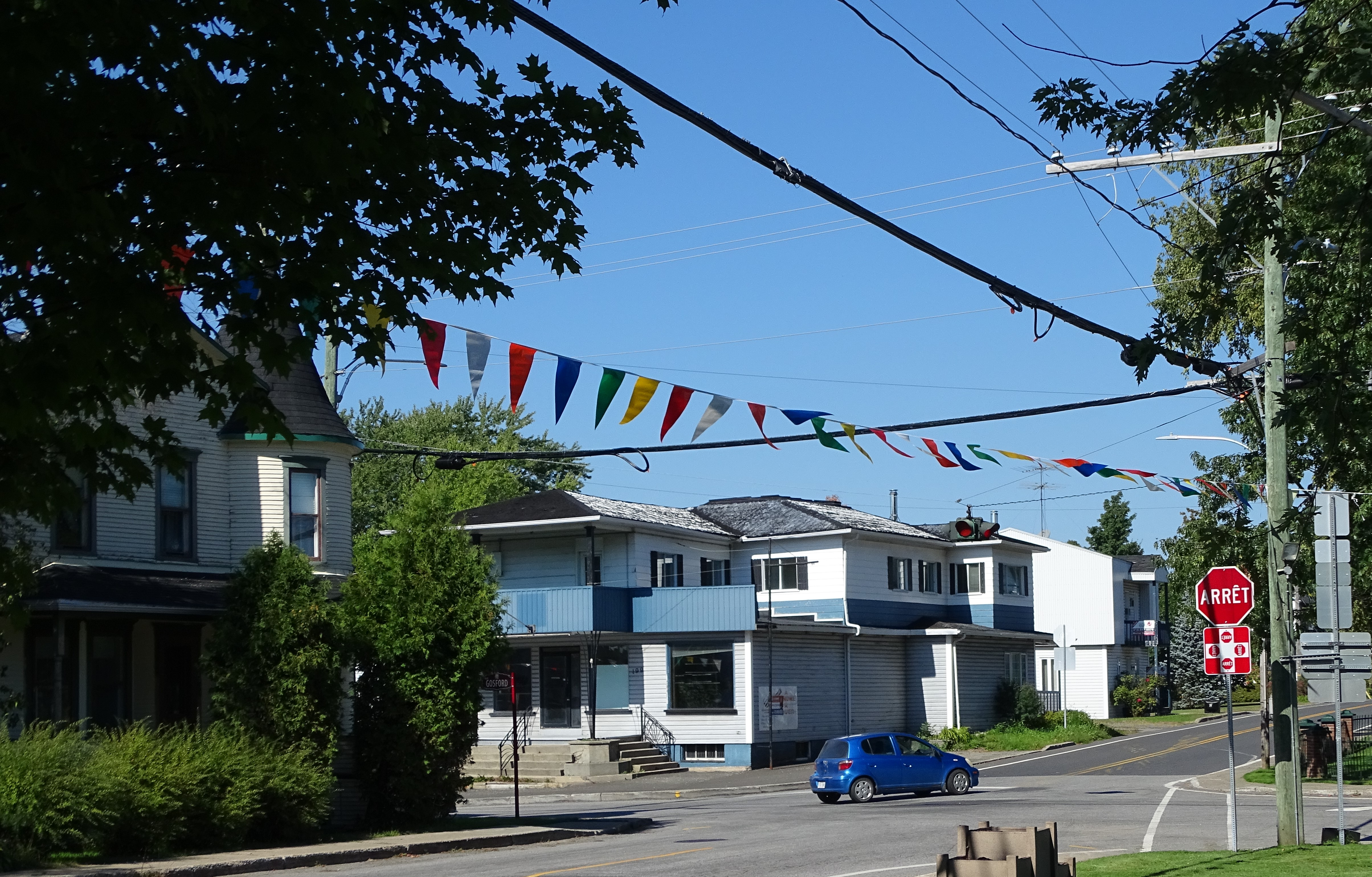
Town

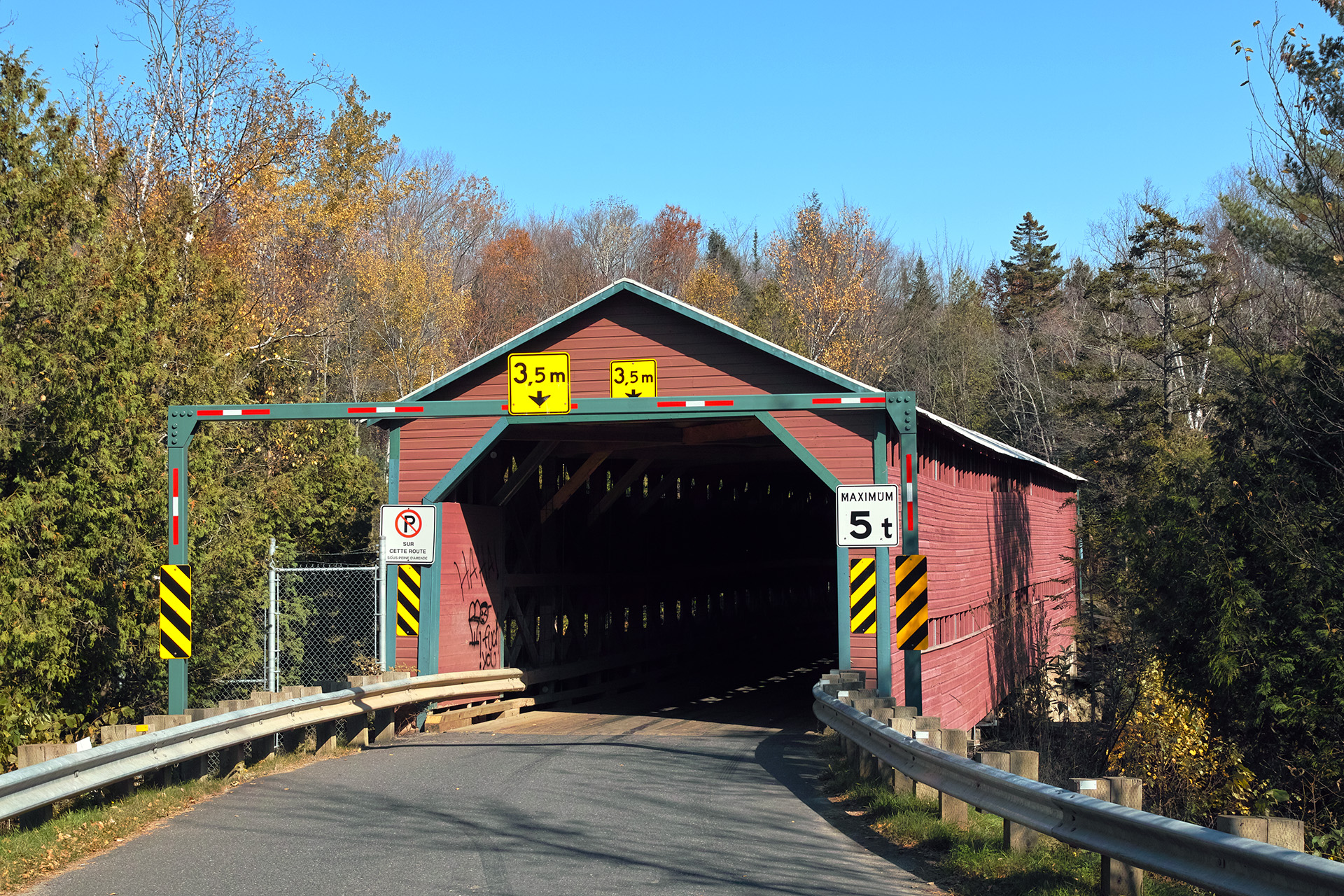
Red Bridge

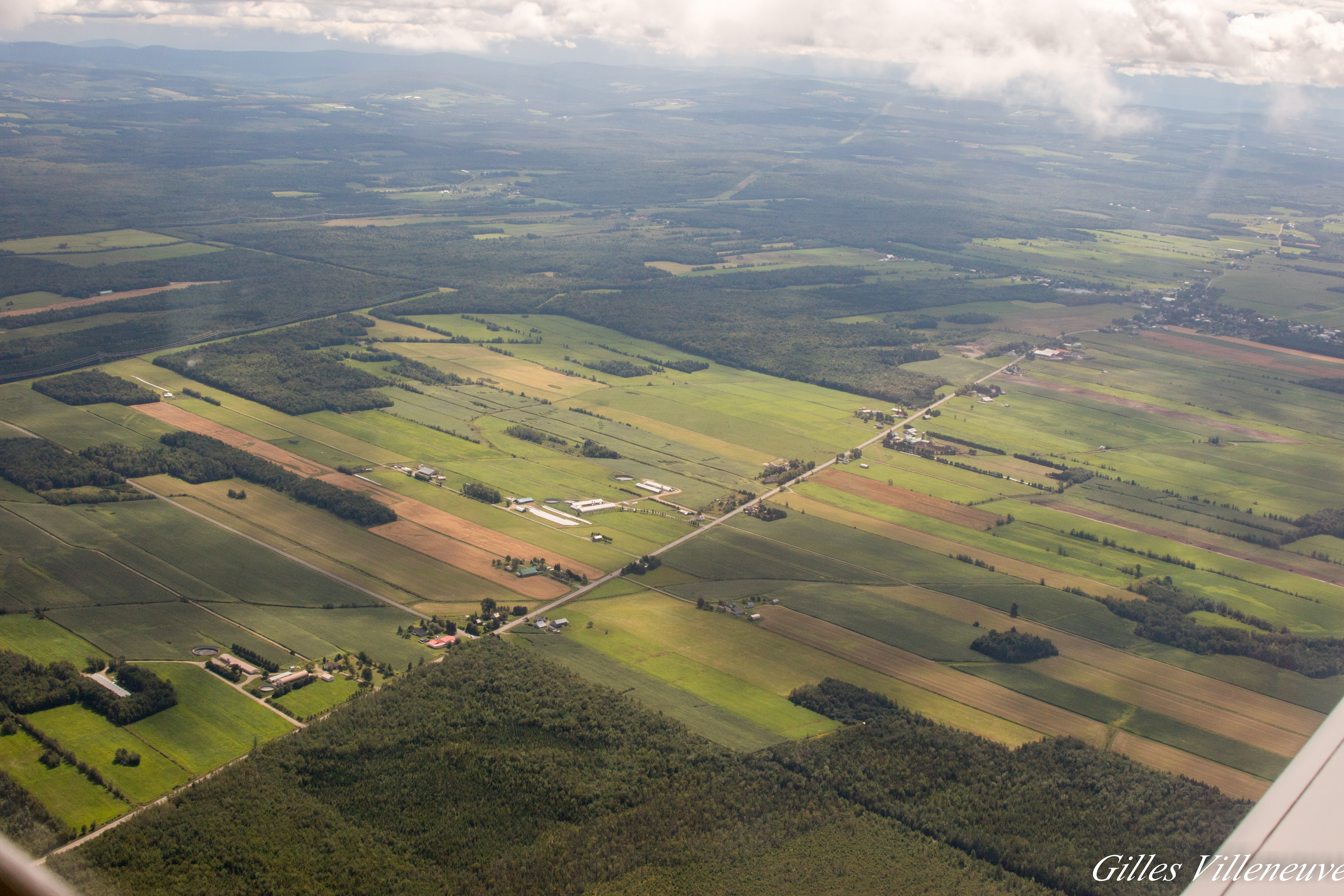
From the air, 2019
