= Saint-Patrice-de-Beaurivage =

- Municipality
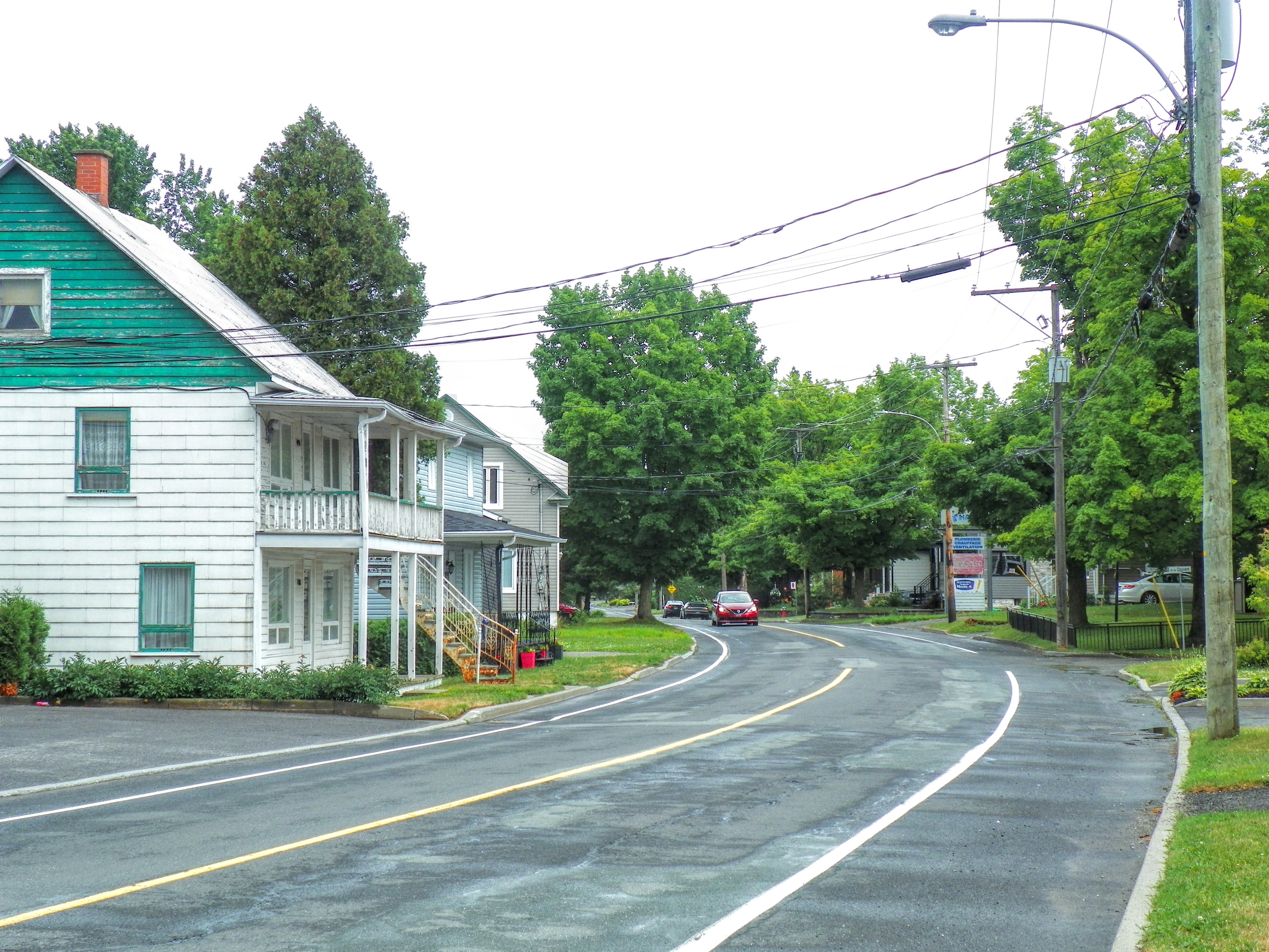
- View of the village.

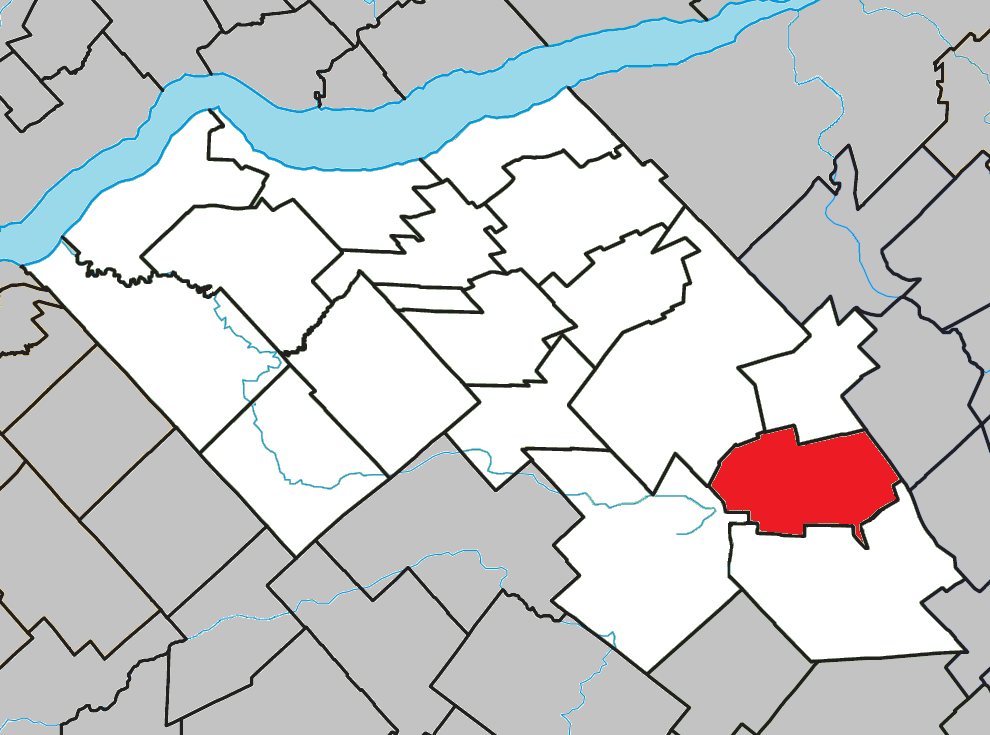
- Location within Lotbinière RCM.

- Location in southern Quebec.
- Coordinates: 46°25′N 71°14′W
- Country: Canada
- Province: Quebec
- Region: Chaudière-Appalaches
- RCM: Lotbinière
- Constituted: September 29, 1984

Government
  - Mayor: Sylvie Laplante
  - Federal riding: Lévis—Lotbinière
  - Prov. riding: Lotbinière-Frontenac

Area
  - Total: 85.50 km^{2} (33.01 sq mi)
  - Land: 85.73 km^{2} (33.10 sq mi)
- There is an apparent contradiction between two authoritative sources

Population (2021)
  - Total: 1,109
  - Density: 12.9/km^{2} (33/sq mi)
  - Pop 2016-2021: ▲7%
  - Dwellings: 474
- Time zone: UTC−5 (EST)
  - Summer (DST): UTC−4 (EDT)
- Postal code(s): G0S 1B0
- Area codes: 418 and 581
- Highways: R-269
- Website: www.ville.saint-patrice -de-beaurivage.qc.ca

Saint-Patrice-de-Beaurivage (French pronunciation: [sɛ̃ patʁis də boʁivaʒ]) is a municipality in the Lotbinière Regional County Municipality in Quebec, Canada. It is part of the Chaudière-Appalaches region and had a population is 1,109 as of 2021. It is named after Saint Patrick, as its first settlers were Irish. Beaurivage is associated to the seigneurie of Beaurivage, also known as Saint-Gilles.

== Demographics ==
=== Population ===
Population trend:

Census	Population	Change (%)
2021	1,109	▲7.0%
2016	1,036	▼4.1%
2011	1,080	▲4.1%
2006	1,037	▼6.2%
2001	1,105	▼1.8%
1996	1,125	▼0.9%
1991	1,135	▲1.4%
1986	1,119	N/A

=== Language ===
Mother tongue (2021)

Language	Population	Pct (%)
French only	1,070	96.8%
English only	10	0.9%
Non-official language	20	1.8%
English & French	5	0.5%
