= Centre de services scolaire des Navigateurs =

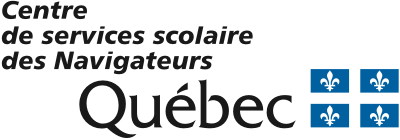

Address
- 1860 1re Rue Lévis, Quebec; Canada

District information
- Established: June 15, 2020; 4 years ago

Other information
- Website: web.cssdn.gouv.qc.ca

Centre de services scolaire des Navigateurs is a French-language school service centre in Chaudière-Appalaches, Quebec, Canada. Its web site gives its address as Saint-Romuald, a former town annexed to Lévis several years ago. The director general is Esther Lemieux.

In 2020 the centre replaced the old Commission scolaire des Navigateurs.

== Territory ==
It operates the following schools.

=== District 1 ===
(Lotbinière, Sainte-Croix, Saint-Antoine-de-Tilly, Dosquet, Quebec, Saint-Flavien, Quebec, Saint-Édouard, Quebec, Leclercville, Quebec, Joly, Laurier-Station, Saint-Apollinaire, Sainte-Agathe-de-Lotbinière, Saint-Agapit, Quebec, Saint-Gilles et Saint-Lambert)

- École secondaire Beaurivage (High school)
- École secondaire Pamphile-Le May (High school)
- Falaise/Berge/Chêne,
- La Mennais,
- Clé-d’Or,
- La Source,
- Caravelle,
- Quatre-Vents,
- Sentiers,
- Épervière/Sainte-Thérèse,
- Amitié/Étienne Chartier, Bac.

=== District 2 ===
(Saint-Nicolas, Saint-Rédempteur et Saint-Étienne-de-Lauzon)

- École secondaire de l'Envol (High school)
- École de la Clé-du-Boisé (High school)
- Grand-Voilier,
- Odyssée,
- Étoile,
- Clair-Soleil,
- Martinière,
- Ruche/Savio,
- Tournesol,
- Plein-Soleil et
- Chanterelle.

=== District 3 ===
(Charny, Quebec, Saint-Romuald, Quebec, Saint-David, Quebec et Lévis, Quebec)

- École secondaire les Etchemins (ESLE) (High school)
- École secondaire de l'Aubier (High school)
- Centre de formation en entreprise et récupération (CFER) (High school)
- Petits-Cheminots (La Passerelle et

Notre-Dame),

- Saint-Louis-de-France,
- Notre-Dame-d’Etchemin,
- Auberivière,
- Desjardins,
- Charles-Rodrigue/Pixels,
- Notre-Dame,
- Saint-Dominique,
- CÉAN,
- Centre

de formation professionnelle Gabriel-Rousseau,

- Centre de formation en mécanique de

véhicules lourds

=== District 4 ===
(Sainte-Hélène-de-Breakeyville, Saint-Henri et Saint-Jean-Chrysostome)

- École secondaire de l'Horizon (High school)
- Sainte-Hélène,
- Rose-des-Vents,
- Alizé/Mousserons,
- Taniata,
- Nacelle,
- Belleau/Gagnon,
- Centre de formation en

montage de lignes,

- Centre national de

conduite d’engins de chantier

=== District 5 ===
(Pintendre et Lauzon)

- École secondaire Champagnat/*École secondaire Guillaume-Couture (High schools)
- École Îlot des Appalaches (High school)
- École Pointe-Lévy (High school)
- Saint-Joseph,
- Sainte-Marie/du Ruisseau,
- Moussaillons/du Boisé
- Centre de formation professionnelle

de Lévis

=== Elementary schools ===
- École Belleau
- École Charles-Rodrigue
- École Clair-Soleil
- École de l'Alizé
- École de l'Amitié
- École de l'Auberivière
- École de l'Épervière
- École de l'Odyssée
- École de la Berge
- École de la Caravelle (Dosquet)
- École de la Caravelle (Joly)
- École de la Caravelle (Saint-Flavien)
- École de la Chanterelle
- École de la Clé-d'Or
- École de la Clé-du-Boisé
- École de la Falaise
- École de la Nacelle
- École de la Rose-des-Vents
- École de la Ruche
- École de la Source
- École de Taniata
- École Desjardins
- École des Moussaillons
- École des Mousserons
- École des Petits-Cheminots
- École du Bac
- École du Boisé
- École du Chêne
- École du Grand-Fleuve Pavillon du Méandre
- École du Grand-Fleuve Pavillon Maria-Dominique
- École du Grand-Voilier
- École du Ruisseau
- École du Tournesol
- École Étienne-Chartier
- École Gagnon
- École La Martinière
- École La Mennais
- École Notre-Dame
- École Notre-Dame-d'Etchemin
- École des Quatre-Vents
- École Plein-Soleil
- École Saint-Dominique
- École Saint-Joseph
- École Saint-Louis-de-France
- École Sainte-Hélène
- École Sainte-Marie
- École Sainte-Thérèse

as well as the Centre de formation en entreprise et récupération and adult education programs.
