= Desjardins (surname) =

Desjardins (French, of the gardens) is a French-language surname. Notable people with the surname include:

- Abel Desjardins (1814–1886), French historian
- Abel Desjardins, French surgeon, the namesake of the Desjardins' point
- Alphonse Desjardins (co-operator) (1854–1920), co-founder of the Caisses populaires Desjardins (today Desjardins Group), a forerunner of North American credit unions
- Alphonse Desjardins (politician) (1841–1912), Canadian politician
- André Desjardins (1930–2000), Canadian union official
- Andrew Desjardins (born 1986), Canadian professional ice hockey player
- Anne Desjardins (born 1951), Canadian chef and Knight of the National Order of Quebec
- Anne Heurgon-Desjardins (1899–1977), French philanthropist
- Antoine Émile Ernest Desjardins (1823–1886), French historian, geographer and archaeologist
- Arnaud Desjardins (1925–2011), French author
- Cédrick Desjardins (born 1985), Canadian professional ice hockey goaltender
- Charles-Alfred Desjardins (1846–1934), farmer, merchant, manufacturer and political figure
- Christophe Desjardins (1962–2020), French contemporary violist
- Daniel "Boom" Desjardins (born 1971), French Canadian singer
- Denys Desjardins (born 1966), Canadian film director, cinematographer, and film historian
- Dorimène Roy Desjardins (1858–1932), co-founder of the Caisses populaires Desjardins
- Éric Desjardins (born 1969), Canadian professional ice hockey player
- François Desjardins (born 1970), Canadian President and CEO of the Laurentian Bank
- Gabriel Desjardins (born 1949), Progressive Conservative member of the House of Commons of Canada
- Gerard Ferdinand Desjardins (born 1944), Canadian former ice hockey goaltender
- Huguette Desjardins (born 1938), Canadian artist
- Jacques Desjardins (fl. 1993), Canadian composer
- Jacques Guérin-Desjardins (1894–1982), French politician, National Commissioner of Eclaireurs Unionistes de France (1923–36)
- Jocelyn Desjardins (born 1970), Quebec journalist and politician
- Julien François Desjardins (1799–1840), French zoologist
- Laurent Desjardins (1923–2012), Canadian politician
- Lisa Desjardins (born 1972), American journalist
- Louis-Georges Desjardins (1849–1928), Canadian journalist and politician
- Marcel Desjardins (born 1966), General Manager for the Ottawa Redblacks
- Marcel Desjardins (journalist) (1941–2003), Canadian journalist, news editor and director
- Marie desJardins (fl. 1985), American computer scientist
- Marie-Catherine Desjardins (1640–1683), usually referred to as Marie-Catherine de Villedieu, a 17th-century French author
- Martin Desjardins (1637–1694), French sculptor and stuccoist of Dutch birth
- Martin Desjardins (ice hockey) (born 1967), Canadian retired professional ice hockey forward
- Marty Jannetty (born 1960), American professional wrestler
- Paul Desjardins (born 1943), former all-star professional Canadian football offensive lineman
- Paule Desjardins (1929—2007), French singer who represented France in the Eurovision Song Contest 1957
- Pete Desjardins (1907–1985), American diver, participated in 1924 and 1928 Summer Olympics
- Pierre Desjardins (born 1941), former professional Canadian football player
- Raynald Desjardins (born 1953), Canadian mobster
- Richard Desjardins (born 1948), singer-songwriter, actor, and documentary film maker from the Canadian province of Quebec
- Robert Desjardins (born 1967), Canadian professional goaltender
- Robert Desjardins (curler) (born 1970), Canadian curler
- Samuel Desjardins (1852–1924), Canadian politician
- Sarah Desjardins (born 1994), Canadian actor
- Susan Y. Desjardins (fl. 1980–2012), American major general and Director, Plans and Policy (J5), Headquarters U.S. Strategic Command
- Thierry Desjardins (born 1941), French reporter and pamphleteer
- Vic Desjardins (1898–1988), American-born ice hockey player
- Wilbrod "Willie" Desjardins (born 1957), Canadian professional ice hockey coach and player
- Yvan Desjardins (born 1975), Canadian figure skating coach and former competitor

== See also ==
- Dejardin (disambiguation)
- Desjardins (disambiguation)
