= Les Chutes-de-la-Chaudière =

Les Chutes-de-la-Chaudière may refer to:

- Les Chutes-de-la-Chaudière Regional County Municipality, a former regional county municipality in Quebec
- Les Chutes-de-la-Chaudière-Est, Lévis, Quebec, a borough of Lévis, Quebec
- Les Chutes-de-la-Chaudière-Ouest, Lévis, Quebec, a borough of Lévis, Quebec
- Les Chutes-de-la-Chaudière, the original name of Chutes-de-la-Chaudière (electoral district) in Quebec, in its first election in 1989

== See also ==
- Chaudière (disambiguation)
- Chutes-de-la-Chaudière (disambiguation)
