= Desjardins Regional County Municipality =

Desjardins
- Regional county municipality
- Interactive map of Desjardins
- Coordinates: 46°45′N 71°07′W
- Country: Canada
- Province: Quebec
- Region: Chaudière-Appalaches
- Effective: January 1982
- Dissolved: December 31, 2001
- County seat: Lévis

Government
  - Type: Prefecture

Area
  - Total: 255 km^{2} (98 sq mi)
  - Land: 256.44 km^{2} (99.01 sq mi)
- There is an apparent contradiction between two authoritative sources

Population (2001)
  - Total: 51,855
  - Density: 202.2/km^{2} (524/sq mi)
  - Change (1996–2001): ▲1.2%
  - Dwellings: 22,663
- Time zone: UTC−5 (EST)
  - Summer (DST): UTC−4 (EDT)
- Area code: 418

Desjardins (French pronunciation: [deʒaʁdɛ̃]) was a regional county municipality in the Chaudière-Appalaches region of Quebec, Canada. It and Les Chutes-de-la-Chaudière Regional County Municipality were formed from the division of Lévis County in the 1980s. Desjardins ceased to exist when most of it, along with most of Les Chutes-de-la-Chaudière RCM, amalgamated into the expanded city of Lévis on January 1, 2002.

== Subdivisions ==
Desjardins RCM consisted of:

- Lévis (in its pre-amalgamation borders)
- Pintendre
- Saint-Henri
- Saint-Joseph-de-Lévy

== Dissolution ==
When Desjardins RCM was dissolved, nearly all of its components amalgamated into the newly expanded Lévis:

- Lévis, Pintendre, Saint-Joseph-de-Lévy amalgamated into the newly expanded Lévis and comprised the Desjardins borough of that city.
- Saint-Henri remained independent and joined Bellechasse Regional County Municipality.

== See also ==
- 21st-century municipal history of Quebec
- Desjardins (disambiguation)
