= École secondaire l'Horizon =

Location
- 200 Place Centre-ville; Saint-Jean-Chrysostome, Quebec, G6Z 3B9; Canada
- Coordinates: 46.7251°N 71.2133°W

Information
- School type: Middle School
- Founded: 1994
- School board: Commission scolaire des Navigateurs
- Principal: Pascal Blanchette
- Grades: Secondary 1-3
- Language: French
- Website: ecoles.csdn.qc.ca/horizon/

École secondaire l'Horizon is a French-language public secondary school located in Saint-Jean-Chrysostome, Quebec, Canada. It is located on Place Centre-ville in the downtown sector of Saint-Jean-Chrysostome and is run by the Commission scolaire des Navigateurs school board. Most of the school's students come from Saint-Jean-Chrysostome and Breakeyville, but some come from the districts of Saint-Romuald and Charny.

== Sports facilities and football team ==
There is a soccer field that becomes a football field in fall.

The high school also has a football team called Les Phénix and there are other sporting teams with the same name at the school.
