= Les Chutes-de-la-Chaudière Regional County Municipality =

Les Chutes-de-la-Chaudière
- Regional county municipality
- Interactive map of Les Chutes-de-la-Chaudière
- Coordinates: 46°42′N 71°17′W
- Country: Canada
- Province: Quebec
- Region: Chaudière-Appalaches
- Effective: January 1982
- Dissolved: December 31, 2001

Government
  - Type: Prefecture

Area
  - Total: 419 km^{2} (162 sq mi)
  - Land: 422.26 km^{2} (163.04 sq mi)
- There is an apparent contradiction between two authoritative sources

Population (2001)
  - Total: 78,808
  - Density: 186.6/km^{2} (483/sq mi)
  - Change (1996–2001): ▲4.2%
  - Dwellings: 30,179
- Time zone: UTC−5 (EST)
  - Summer (DST): UTC−4 (EDT)
- Area code: 418

Les Chutes-de-la-Chaudière (French pronunciation: [le ʃyt də la ʃodjɛʁ]) was a regional county municipality and census division in Quebec. It and Desjardins Regional County Municipality were formed from the division of Lévis County in the 1980s. It ceased to exist when most of it, along with most of Desjardins RCM, amalgamated into the expanded city of Lévis on January 1, 2002.

== Subdivisions ==
Les Chutes-de-la-Chaudière RCM consisted of:

- Charny
- Saint-Étienne-de-Lauzon
- Saint-Jean-Chrysostome
- Saint-Nicolas
- Saint-Lambert-de-Lauzon
- Saint-Rédempteur
- Saint-Romuald
- Sainte-Hélène-de-Breakeyville

== Dissolution ==
When Les Chutes-de-la-Chaudière RCM was dissolved, nearly all of its components amalgamated into the newly expanded Lévis:

- Saint-Étienne-de-Lauzon, Saint-Nicolas, Saint-Redempteur composed the borough of Les Chutes-de-la-Chaudière-Ouest.
- Charny, Saint-Jean-Chrysostome, Saint-Romuald, and Sainte-Hélène-de-Breakeyville composed the borough of Les Chutes-de-la-Chaudière-Est.
- Saint-Lambert-de-Lauzon remained independent and joined La Nouvelle-Beauce Regional County Municipality.

== See also ==
- 21st-century municipal history of Quebec
