= Marc Picard =

Canadian politician (born 1955)

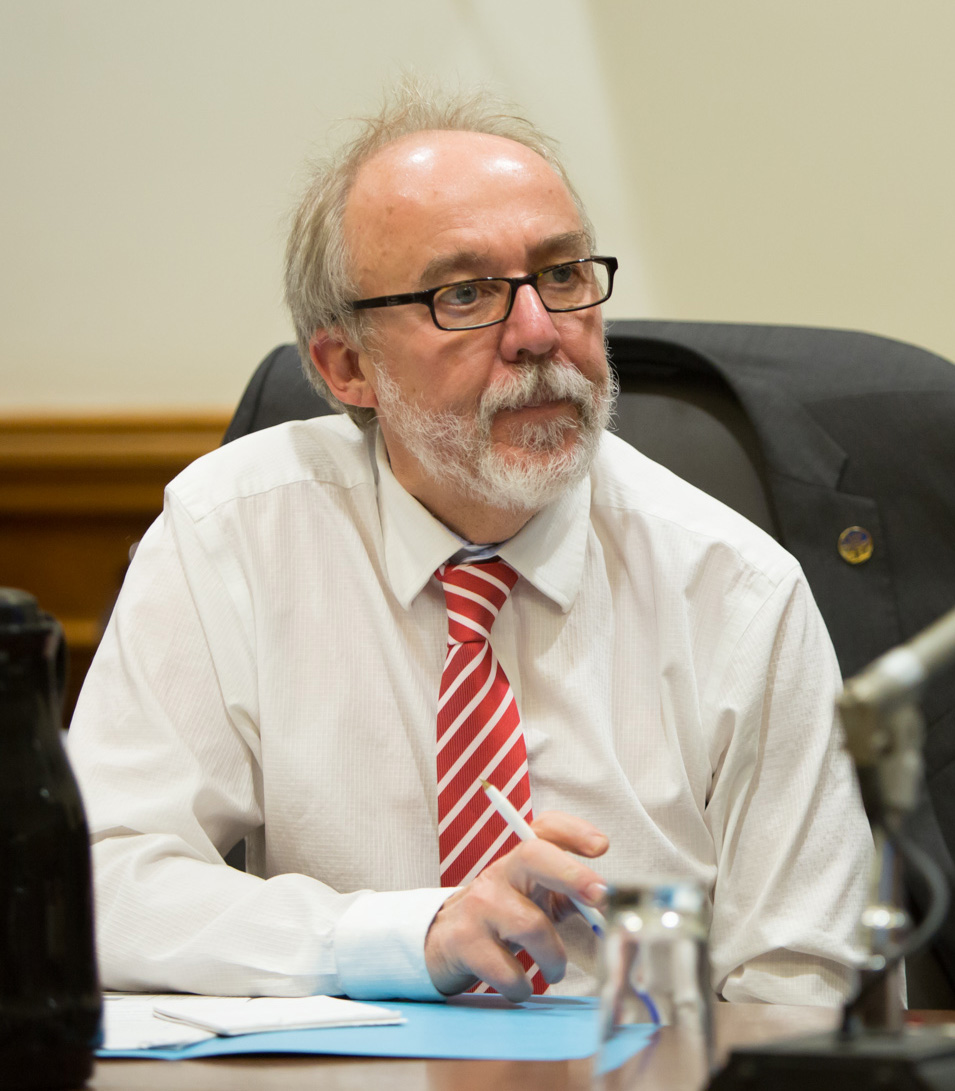

Member of the National Assembly of Quebec for Chutes-de-la-Chaudière
- In office April 14, 2003 – August 28, 2022
- Preceded by: Denise Carrier-Perreault
- Succeeded by: Martine Biron

Personal details
- Born: April 25, 1955 (age 71) Saint-Raphaël, Quebec, Canada
- Party: ADQ (2003-2009); Independent (2009-2011); CAQ (2011-present)
- Spouse: Lynda Boivin
- Cabinet: Third Vice-President of the National Assembly of Quebec

Marc Picard (born April 25, 1955) is a Canadian politician from the province of Quebec. He represented the electoral district of Chutes-de-la-Chaudière in the National Assembly of Quebec from 2003 to 2022, first elected as a member of the ADQ, and from 2012 onwards for the CAQ.

Born in Saint-Raphaël (Bellechasse), Quebec, Picard has a college diploma in business administration from the Cégep de Lévis-Lauzon and worked for the Quebec Ministry of Revenue for 25 years as a research officer. He also studied accounting at Université Laval. He also worked for the Canadian Mental Health Association and the Saint-Jean-Chrysostome Helping Agency

In 1999, Picard was elected to the council of the town of Saint-Jean-Chrysostome. Two years later, the provincial government merged a number of municipal governments, including the one of Saint-Jean-Chrysostome to the city of Lévis. Picard served on the new city council until he won a seat in the provincial legislature for the Action démocratique du Québec (ADQ).

Picard was first elected as a Member of the National Assembly in the 2003 election.

In 2007, Picard was easily re-elected with 59% of the vote. Parti Québécois (PQ) candidate and former Bloc Québécois member of the House of Commons of Canada, Yvan Loubier, finished second with 18% of the vote.

On May 8, 2007, Picard became Third Deputy Speaker of the House.

In the 2008 election, Picard won re-election with 45% of the vote, even though his party's support sharply declined.

On August 22, 2009, he issued his support for Éric Caire in the leadership race of the ADQ. Following Caire's defeat, he and Caire left the ADQ, complaining of the attitude of victor Gilles Taillon. On December 19, 2011 he joined the CAQ.

== Footnotes ==
National Assembly of Quebec
Preceded by François Gendron (PQ)	Third Deputy Speaker of the House; 2007–2009	Succeeded by François Gendron (PQ)
Political offices
Preceded by none	City Councillor, District no. 7 (Saint-Jean-Chrysostome), Lévis; 2001–2003	Succeeded by Guy Dumoulin
