= Etchemin =

Etchemin may refer to:

- Etchemin language, a language of the Algonquian language family, spoken in early colonial times on the coast of Maine
- Etchemin River, a river in the Chaudière-Appalaches region of eastern Quebec

== See also ==
- Beauce-Etchemin School Board, headquartered in Saint-Georges, Quebec
- Bellechasse—Etchemins—Montmagny—L'Islet, a former federal electoral district in Quebec (1997-2004)
- Bellechasse—Les Etchemins—Lévis, a federal electoral district in Quebec (from 2004)
- École secondaire les Etchemins, a school in Charny, Quebec
- Lac-Etchemin, Quebec, a municipality in and the seat of Les Etchemins Regional County Municipality
  - Lac Etchemin Airport
- Les Etchemins Regional County Municipality, Quebec
