= Chutes-de-la-Chaudière =

Chutes-de-la-Chaudière or Chutes de la Chaudière may refer to:

- Chutes de la Chaudière (or Chaudière Falls) on the Chaudière River in Lévis, Quebec, Canada
- Chutes de la Chaudière, French name for the Chaudière Falls on the Ottawa River in the centre of the Ottawa-Gatineau metropolitan area in Canada
- Chutes-de-la-Chaudière (electoral district), a Quebec provincial electoral district

== See also ==
- Chaudière (disambiguation)
- Les Chutes-de-la-Chaudière (disambiguation)
- Lotbinière—Chutes-de-la-Chaudière, a Canadian federal electoral district in Quebec
- Lévis-et-Chutes-de-la-Chaudière, a former Canadian federal electoral district
