= Chutes-de-la-Chaudière (electoral district) =

Provincial electoral district in Quebec, Canada

Coordinates: 46.487°N 71.256°W

Quebec electoral district

Provincial electoral district
- Legislature: National Assembly of Quebec
MNA
Dominique Dumas
Conservative
- District created: 1988
- First contested: 1989
- Last contested: 2026

Demographics
- Population (2006): 68,114
- Electors (2014): 55,587
- Area (km²): 325.5
- Pop. density (per km²): 209.3
- Census division: Lévis (part)
- Census subdivision: Lévis (part)

Chutes-de-la-Chaudière (French pronunciation: [ʃyt də la ʃodjɛʁ]) is a provincial electoral district in the Chaudière-Appalaches region of Quebec, Canada, that elects members to the National Assembly of Quebec. The district is located within the city of Lévis, and comprises part of the borough of Les Chutes-de-la-Chaudière-Est (the part that is south of Autoroute 20) and all of the borough of Les Chutes-de-la-Chaudière-Ouest.

It was created for the 1989 election from parts of Beauce-Nord and Lévis electoral districts. For that first election only, its name was Les Chutes-de-la-Chaudière.

== Members of the National Assembly ==
| Legislature | Years | Member | Party |
|---|---|---|---|
Les Chutes-de-la-Chaudière; Riding created from Beauce-Nord and Lévis
| 34th | 1989–1994 | Denise Carrier-Perreault | Parti Québécois |
Chutes-de-la-Chaudière
| 35th | 1994–1998 | Denise Carrier-Perreault | Parti Québécois |
| 36th | 1998–2003 | Denise Carrier-Perreault | Parti Québécois |
| 37th | 2003–2007 | Marc Picard | Action démocratique |
| 38th | 2007–2008 | Marc Picard | Action démocratique |
| 39th | 2008–2009 | Marc Picard | Action démocratique |
| 39th | 2009–2011 | Marc Picard | Independent |
| 39th | 2011–2012 | Marc Picard | Coalition Avenir Québec |
| 40th | 2012–2014 | Marc Picard | Coalition Avenir Québec |
| 41st | 2014–2018 | Marc Picard | Coalition Avenir Québec |
| 42nd | 2018–2022 | Marc Picard | Coalition Avenir Québec |
| 43rd | 2022–2026 | Martine Biron | Coalition Avenir Québec |
| 44th | 2026–Present | Dominique Dumas | Conservative |

== Election results ==
2026 Quebec general election
** Preliminary results — Not yet official **
| Party | Candidate | Votes | % | ±% |
|---|---|---|---|---|
| Conservative | Dominique Dumas | 22,752 | 45.74 | +18.54 |
| Parti Québécois | Serge Bonin | 11,413 | 22.94 | +11.83 |
| Liberal | Stéphane Clavet | 6,543 | 13.15 | +8.20 |
| Coalition Avenir Québec | Martine Biron | 5,702 | 11.46 | –36.00 |
| Québec solidaire | Jean-Benoît Ouellet | 2,691 | 5.41 | –3.87 |
| Parti nul | Dominic Dumas | 512 | 1.03 | N/A |
| Présence | David Baillargeon | 133 | 0.27 | N/A |
| Total valid votes | | 49,746 | 98.82 | +0.28 |
| Total rejected ballots | | 594 | 1.18 | –0.28 |
| Turnout | | 50,340 | 80.99 | +2.08 |
| Electors on the lists | | 62,158 | | |
| Conservative gain from Coalition Avenir Québec | | Swing | | +3.36 |
Source: Élections Québec

2022 Quebec general election
| Party | Candidate | Votes | % | ±% |
|---|---|---|---|---|
| Coalition Avenir Québec | Martine Biron | 22,055 | 47.46 | –12.05 |
| Conservative | Mario Fortier | 12,640 | 27.20 | +22.92 |
| Parti Québécois | François-Noël Brault | 5,163 | 11.11 | +1.75 |
| Québec solidaire | Caroline Thibault | 4,311 | 9.28 | –2.15 |
| Liberal | Wafa Oueslati | 2,298 | 4.95 | –8.99 |
| Total valid votes | | 46,467 | 98.54 | +0.27 |
| Total rejected ballots | | 689 | 1.46 | –0.27 |
| Turnout | | 47,156 | 78.91 | +2.28 |
| Electors on the lists | | 59,763 | – | – |

2018 Quebec general election
| Party | Candidate | Votes | % | ±% |
|---|---|---|---|---|
| Coalition Avenir Québec | Marc Picard | 25,777 | 59.51 | +11.81 |
| Liberal | Ghyslain Vaillancourt | 6,038 | 13.94 | -18.57 |
| Québec solidaire | Olivier Bolduc | 4,950 | 11.43 | +7.01 |
| Parti Québécois | Serge Bonin | 4,055 | 9.36 | -3.54 |
| Conservative | Philippe Gaboury | 1,854 | 4.28 | +2.96 |
| Citoyens au pouvoir | Stéphane Blais | 341 | 0.79 | |
| New Democratic | Evelyne Henry | 301 | 0.69 | |
| Total valid votes | | 43,316 | 98.27 | |
| Total rejected ballots | | 764 | 1.73 | |
| Turnout | | 44,080 | 76.63 | |
| Eligible voters | | 57,523 | | |
| Coalition Avenir Québec hold | | Swing | | +15.19 |
Source(s) "Rapport des résultats officiels du scrutin". Élections Québec.

2014 Quebec general election
| Party | Candidate | Votes | % |
|---|---|---|---|
| Coalition Avenir Québec | Marc Picard | 21,288 | 47.70 |
| Liberal | Ghyslain Vaillancourt | 14,548 | 32.51 |
| Parti Québécois | Catherine Paré | 5,758 | 12.90 |
| Québec solidaire | Olivier Bolduc | 1,973 | 4.42 |
| Conservative | Benoit Cloutier | 589 | 1.32 |
| Parti des sans Parti | Dave Gagné | 272 | 0.61 |
| Option nationale | Alexis Lévesque-Morin | 236 | 0.53 |
| Total valid votes | | 44,625 | 99.04 |
| Total rejected ballots | | 433 | 0.96 |
| Turnout | | 45,058 | 81.06 |
| Electors on the lists | | 55,587 | – |

2012 Quebec general election
| Party | Candidate | Votes | % | ±% |
|---|---|---|---|---|
| Coalition Avenir Québec | Marc Picard | 24,267 | 53.79 | +9.02 |
| Liberal | Réal St-Laurent | 10,356 | 22.96 | -7.76 |
| Parti Québécois | Daniel Lachance | 7,678 | 17.02 | -4.41 |
| Québec solidaire | Eveline Gueppe | 1,727 | 3.83 | +0.74 |
| Green | Marielle Parent | 622 | 1.38 | |
| Conservative | Renaud Grégoire | 462 | 1.02 | |
| Total valid votes | | 45,112 | 98.11 | – |
| Total rejected ballots | | 869 | 1.89 | – |
| Turnout | | 45,981 | 84.12 | |
| Electors on the lists | | 54,662 | – | – |
| Coalition Avenir Québec hold | | Swing | | +8.39 |

^ Change is from redistributed results. CAQ change is from ADQ.

2008 Quebec general election
| Party | Candidate | Votes | % | ±% |
|---|---|---|---|---|
| Action démocratique | Marc Picard | 15,536 | 44.77 | |
| Liberal | Réal St-Laurent | 10,657 | 30.71 | |
| Parti Québécois | Marîe Raiche | 7,437 | 21.43 | |
| Québec solidaire | Marie-Hélène Côté-Brochu | 1,070 | 3.08 | |

2007 Quebec general election
| Party | Candidate | Votes | % | ±% |
|---|---|---|---|---|
| Action démocratique | Marc Picard | 24,378 | 58.99 | +20.17 |
| Parti Québécois | Yvan Loubier | 7,618 | 18.43 | -7.89 |
| Liberal | France Proulx | 7,292 | 17.65 | -15.50 |
| Green | Jean-Luc Bugnon | 1,183 | 2.86 | - |
| Québec solidaire | Éveline Gueppe | 854 | 2.07 | +0.36* |

* Result compared to UFP

2003 Quebec general election
| Party | Candidate | Votes | % | ±% |
|---|---|---|---|---|
| Action démocratique | Marc Picard | 14,759 | 38.82 | +20.17 |
| Liberal | Pauline Houde-Landry | 12,601 | 33.15 | +2.83 |
| Parti Québécois | Antoine Dubé | 10,007 | 26.32 | -23.30 |
| UFP | Jean Bernatchez | 649 | 1.71 | - |

1998 Quebec general election
| Party | Candidate | Votes | % | ±% |
|---|---|---|---|---|
| Parti Québécois | Denise Carrier-Perreault | 22,577 | 49.62 | -2.18 |
| Liberal | Christian Jobin | 13,796 | 30.32 | +7.67 |
| Action démocratique | Daniel Jacques | 8,486 | 18.65 | +0.81 |
| Socialist Democracy | Mario Trépanier | 358 | 0.79 | -1.26 |
| Independent | Steve Caouette | 286 | 0.63 | - |

1995 Quebec referendum
| Side | Votes | % |
|---|---|---|
| Oui | 29,456 | 60.06 |
| Non | 19,587 | 39.94 |

1994 Quebec general election
| Party | Candidate | Votes | % | ±% |
|---|---|---|---|---|
| Parti Québécois | Denise Carrier-Perreault | 21,091 | 51.80 | +2.86 |
| Liberal | Shirley Baril | 9,220 | 22.65 | -22.95 |
| Action démocratique | Jacques Bussières | 7,263 | 17.84 | - |
| Independent | Alphonse Bernard Carrier | 904 | 2.22 | - |
| New Democrat | Mario Trépanier | 834 | 2.05 | -2.59 |
| Independent | Jean Duchesneau | 640 | 1.57 | - |
| Independent | Pierre Chamberland | 483 | 1.19 | - |
| Natural Law | Eddy Gagné | 279 | 0.69 | - |

1989 Quebec general election
| Party | Candidate | Votes | % |
|---|---|---|---|
| Parti Québécois | Denise Carrier-Perreault | 15,889 | 48.94 |
| Liberal | Denis Therrien | 14,805 | 45.60 |
| New Democrat | Dany Gravel | 1,505 | 4.64 |
| Socialist Movement | Bertrand Gignac | 270 | 0.83 |

== See also ==
- List of Quebec provincial electoral districts
- Canadian provincial electoral districts
