= Denise Carrier-Perreault =

Canadian politician

Member of the National Assembly of Quebec for Chutes-de-la-Chaudière
- In office September 25, 1989 – April 14, 2003
- Preceded by: Riding Established
- Succeeded by: Marc Picard

Personal details
- Born: June 21, 1946 (age 80) Saint-Joseph-de-la-Pointe-De Lévy, Lévis, Quebec
- Party: Parti Québécois

Denise Carrier-Perreault (born June 21, 1946) is a Quebec politician. She represented Chutes-de-la-Chaudière in the National Assembly of Quebec from 1989 to 2003, as a member of the Parti Québécois.

Carrier-Perreault earned a diploma in graphic design from Cégep de Sainte-Foy and a bachelor's degree in industrial relations from Université Laval in 1984. She worked at Bell Canada, as a telephonist from 1963 to 1968, as a union designer from 1968 to 1971 and then as a regional president of the union from 1971 to 1973. From 1984 to 1985 she served as a commissioner with the Chutes-de-la-Chaudière School Board. From 1985 to 1989, she was a Human Resources Management Consultant, just prior to her election, she was a trainer in occupational health and safety.

She ran for the Parti Québécois in the newly created constituency of Chutes-de-la-Chaudière in the 1989 Quebec general election and won. She was re-elected in the 1994 and 1998 Quebec general elections.

Carrier-Perrault served in the government of Lucien Bouchard as Minister for Lands, Mines and Forests.

She did not seek re-election in 2003.

== Cabinet positions ==
Quebec provincial government of Lucien Bouchard
Cabinet post (1)
Predecessor	Office	Successor
Ministry Established	Minister for Lands, Mines and Forests; January 29, 1996–March 8, 2001	Ministry Abolished
