= Chaudière =

Chaudière may refer to:

== Places ==
=== Canada ===
- Chaudière River, a tributary of the Saint Lawrence River, in Quebec, Canada
- Chaudière River (Normandin River), a tributary of the Normandin River, in Lac-Ashuapmushuan, Quebec
- Chaudière Falls on the Ottawa River between Ottawa, Ontario, and Gatineau, Québec
- Chaudière Bridge, crossing the Ottawa River at the Chaudière Falls

=== France ===
- La Chaudière, a village and commune in the Drôme département of south-eastern France

== Ships ==
- HMCS Chaudière (H99) of the Royal Canadian Navy (1943–1946)
- HMCS Chaudière (DDE 235) of the Royal Canadian Navy and Canadian Forces (1959–1974)

== Other uses ==
- Le Régiment de la Chaudière, a Primary Reserve infantry regiment of the Canadian Forces

== See also ==
- Chaudière-Appalaches, an administrative region in Quebec, Canada
- Terrasses de la Chaudière, a government office complex in Gatineau, Quebec, Canada
- Chutes-de-la-Chaudière (disambiguation)
- Les Chutes-de-la-Chaudière (disambiguation)
