= Desjardins =

Desjardins may refer to:

- Desjardins (surname), people with the surname Desjardins
- Desjardins, Lévis, Quebec, Canada, a borough of the city of Lévis
  - Desjardins Regional County Municipality, a regional county municipality which preceded the borough
- Desjardins Canal, in Ontario
- Desjardins Group, a Canadian association of credit unions
  - Desjardins Ontario Credit Union, Desjardins' Ontario operation
  - Desjardins Credit Union, formerly Province of Ontario Savings Office, acquired by Desjardins in 2003
- Délémontez-Desjardins D.01, a French ultralight monoplane

== See also ==
- Dejardin (disambiguation)
- Desjardin (disambiguation)
