= Desjardin (disambiguation) =

Desjardin is one of the longest-running French metal packaging manufacturers, founded in 1848.

Desjardin may also refer to:

- Dennis Desjardin (born 1950), American mycologist
- Jacques Desjardin (or Desjardins; 1759–1907), French general of the Royal Army
- Kathy Desjardin, American politician
- Rita Desjardin, a fictional character from the 1974 Stephen King novel Carrie
- Thomas A. Desjardin (born 1964), American historian

== See also ==
- Dejardin (disambiguation)
- Desjardins (disambiguation)
