= Martine Biron =

Canadian politician

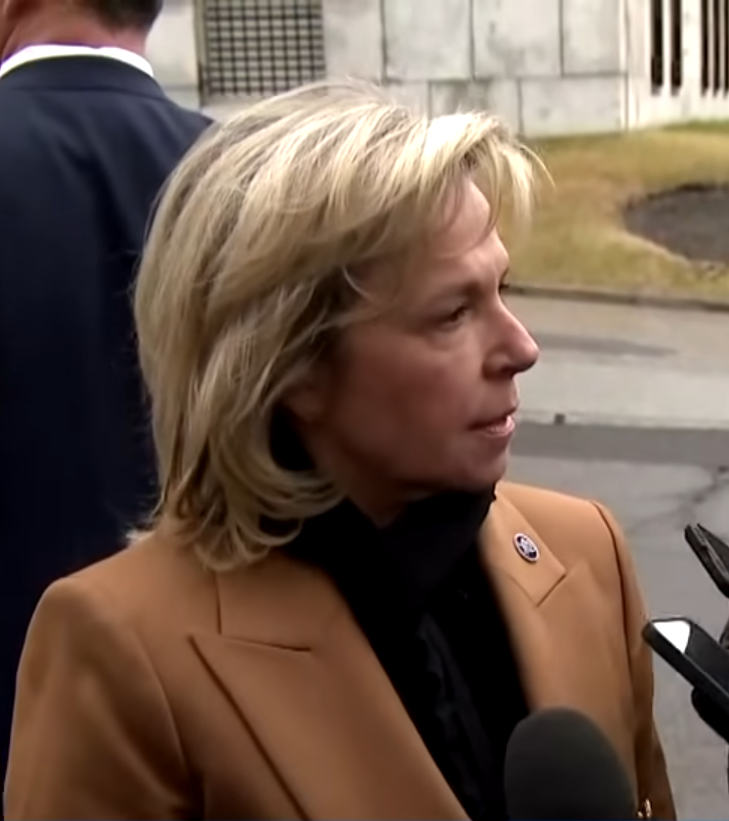
- Biron in 2023

Quebec Minister of Higher Education
- In office September 10, 2025 – October 21, 2026
- Premier: François Legault; Christine Fréchette
- Preceded by: Pascale Déry
- Succeeded by: Elsie Lefebvre

Member of the National Assembly of Quebec for Chutes-de-la-Chaudière
- In office October 3, 2022 – October 5, 2026
- Preceded by: Marc Picard
- Succeeded by: Dominique Dumas

Personal details
- Born: 1962 Montreal, Quebec, Canada
- Party: Coalition Avenir Québec

Martine Biron is a Canadian politician who was elected to the National Assembly of Quebec in the 2022 Quebec general election. She represented the riding of Chutes-de-la-Chaudière as a member of the Coalition Avenir Québec. She served as Minister of Higher Education from 2025 to 2026, and previously served as Minister of International Relations and La Francophonie from 2022 to 2025. She briefly served as Minister of Culture and Communications in October 2026.

== Electoral record ==
2026 Quebec general election: Chutes-de-la-Chaudière
** Preliminary results — Not yet official **
Party	Candidate	Votes	%	±%
Conservative	Dominique Dumas	22,752	45.74	+18.54
Parti Québécois	Serge Bonin	11,413	22.94	+11.83
Liberal	Stéphane Clavet	6,543	13.15	+8.20
Coalition Avenir Québec	Martine Biron	5,702	11.46	–36.00
Québec solidaire	Jean-Benoît Ouellet	2,691	5.41	–3.87
Parti nul	Dominic Dumas	512	1.03	N/A
Présence	David Baillargeon	133	0.27	N/A
Total valid votes		49,746	98.82	+0.28
Total rejected ballots		594	1.18	–0.28
Turnout		50,340	80.99	+2.08
Electors on the lists		62,158		
Conservative gain from Coalition Avenir Québec		Swing		+3.36
Source: Élections Québec

2022 Quebec general election: Chutes-de-la-Chaudière
Party	Candidate	Votes	%	±%
Coalition Avenir Québec	Martine Biron	22,055	47.46	–12.05
Conservative	Mario Fortier	12,640	27.20	+22.92
Parti Québécois	François-Noël Brault	5,163	11.11	+1.75
Québec solidaire	Caroline Thibault	4,311	9.28	–2.15
Liberal	Wafa Oueslati	2,298	4.95	–8.99
Total valid votes		46,467	98.54	+0.27
Total rejected ballots		689	1.46	–0.27
Turnout		47,156	78.91	+2.28
Electors on the lists		59,763	–	–
