= Desjardins, Lévis, Quebec =

Borough of Lévis, Quebec, Canada

Coordinates: 46.7959°N 71.1764°W

Desjardins (French pronunciation: [deʒaʁdɛ̃]) is a borough of the city of Lévis, Quebec. It was created on January 1, 2002.

It has three districts, corresponding to former municipalities:

- Lévis (the territory of the pre-2002 city)
- Pintendre
- Saint-Joseph-de-la-Pointe-De Lévy

The pre-2002 city of Lévis had already annexed the former municipalities of Lauzon and Saint-David-de-l'Auberivière in 1989.

== See also ==
- Desjardins (disambiguation)
