= Dorimène Roy Desjardins =

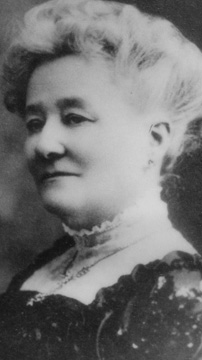
- Born: 17 September 1858; Sorel, Province of Canada, British Empire
- Died: 14 June 1932 (aged 73); Lévis, Quebec, Canada
- Occupation: founder Desjardins Group
- Spouse: Alphonse Desjardins

Marie-Clara Dorimène Roy Desjardins (September 17, 1858 – June 14, 1932) and her husband, Alphonse Desjardins, were the co-founders of the Caisses populaires Desjardins (today Desjardins Group), a forerunner of North American credit unions. She was appointed honorary member of the Union régionale des caisses populaires Desjardins de Québec in 1923.
