= Anne Desjardins =

Canadian chef

Anne Desjardins (born 1951) is a Canadian chef and Knight of the National Order of Quebec. She is known for her use of and promotion of local ingredients and produce in her cooking.

She was born in Montreal, Quebec in 1951. She studied geography at the University of Quebec at Montreal before becoming a self-taught chef when she moved to Quebec City.

Desjardins was head chef at restaurant L’eau à la bouche in Sainte-Adèle in Quebec, for 35 years, which she opened with her husband Pierre Audette in 1979 and where her eldest son, Emmanuel, was sous-chef. It was named the best restaurant in the Montreal area by Gourmet Magazine three times. After the closure of the restaurant in April 2013, she joined the restaurant La Coupole in Hôtel Le Crystal in Montreal as a consultant.

She was awarded the Roger-Champoux prize, and in 2002 she was made Knight of the National Order of Quebec. In 2002, she was also awarded the Renaud-Cyr prize by the Quebec Ministry of Agriculture, Fisheries and Food.

She is the author of several cookbooks, including L’Eau à la bouche: les quatre saisons selon, and makes regular appearances on television. She also gives cooking classes at L'Académie Culinaire in Montreal.
