= Dominique Dumas =

Radio personality and Quebec politician

Dominique Dumas MNA

Member of the National Assembly for Chutes-de-la-Chaudière
- Incumbent
- Assumed office October 5, 2026
- Preceded by: Martine Biron

Personal details
- Party: Conservative

Dominique Dumas is a Quebec politician who was the elected to the National Assembly of Quebec for Chutes-de-la-Chaudière in the 2026 Quebec general election as a member of the Conservative Party of Quebec. He is a radio personality in the Quebec City region. He is known as Dominique "Doom" Dumas by listeners of "trash radio".

== Electoral record ==
2026 Quebec general election: Chutes-de-la-Chaudière
** Preliminary results — Not yet official **
Party	Candidate	Votes	%	±%
Conservative	Dominique Dumas	22,752	45.74	+18.54
Parti Québécois	Serge Bonin	11,413	22.94	+11.83
Liberal	Stéphane Clavet	6,543	13.15	+8.20
Coalition Avenir Québec	Martine Biron	5,702	11.46	–36.00
Québec solidaire	Jean-Benoît Ouellet	2,691	5.41	–3.87
Parti nul	Dominic Dumas	512	1.03	N/A
Présence	David Baillargeon	133	0.27	N/A
Total valid votes		49,746	98.82	+0.28
Total rejected ballots		594	1.18	–0.28
Turnout		50,340	80.99	+2.08
Electors on the lists		62,158		
Conservative gain from Coalition Avenir Québec		Swing		+3.36
Source: Élections Québec
