= Desjardins' point =

Point on the abdomen above the head of the pancreas

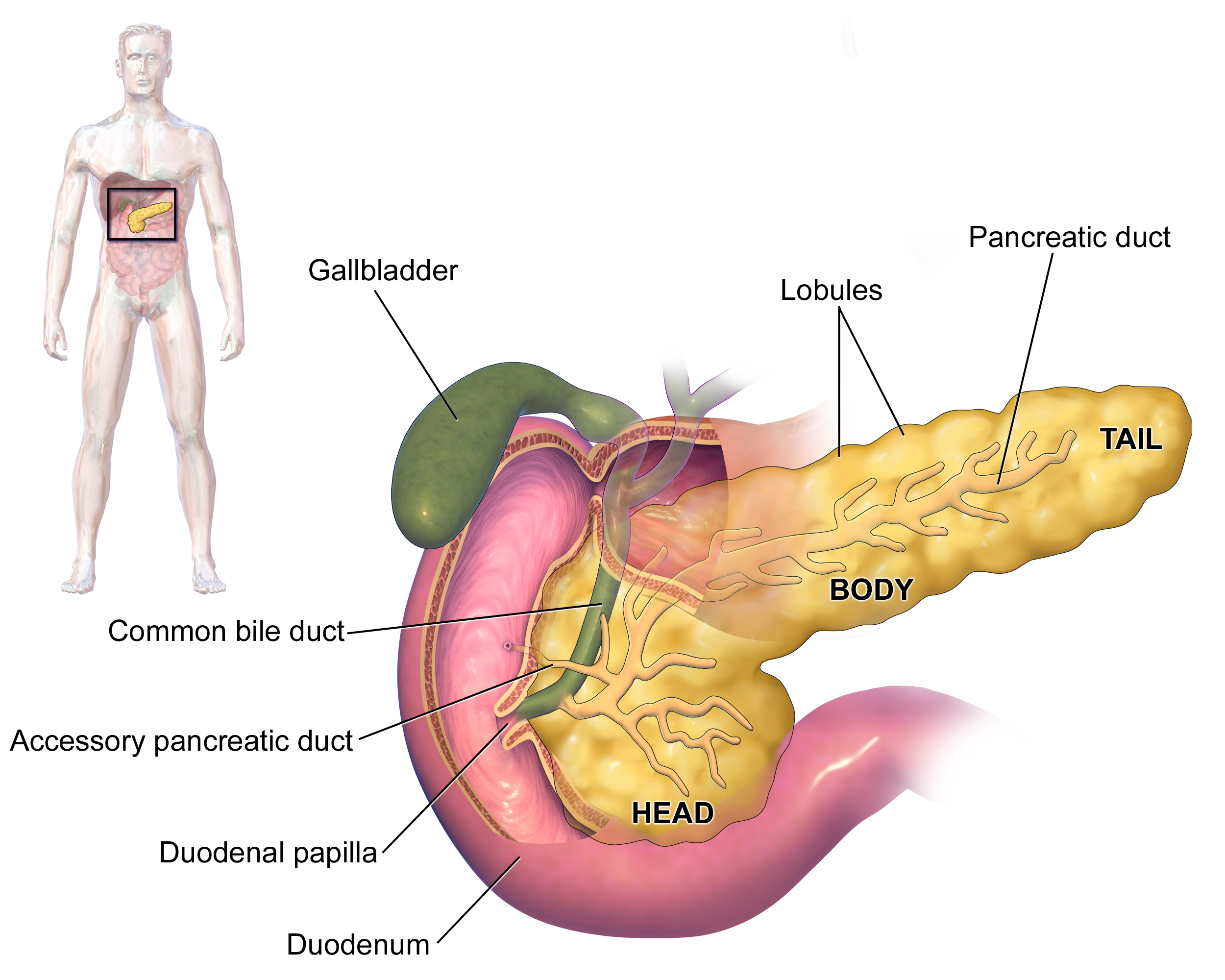
Pancreas anatomy

The Desjardins' pancreatic point or Desjardins' point is the point on the surface of the abdomen above the head of the pancreas. It is located approximately 5-7 cm off the navel on the line running from it to the right armpit. It is named after the French surgeon Abel Desjardins.

Painfulness during the palpation of the abdomen at this point is among the earliest known medical signs for diagnosing pancreas disorders.
