= Alphonse Desjardins (co-operator) =

Canadian businessman (1854-1920)

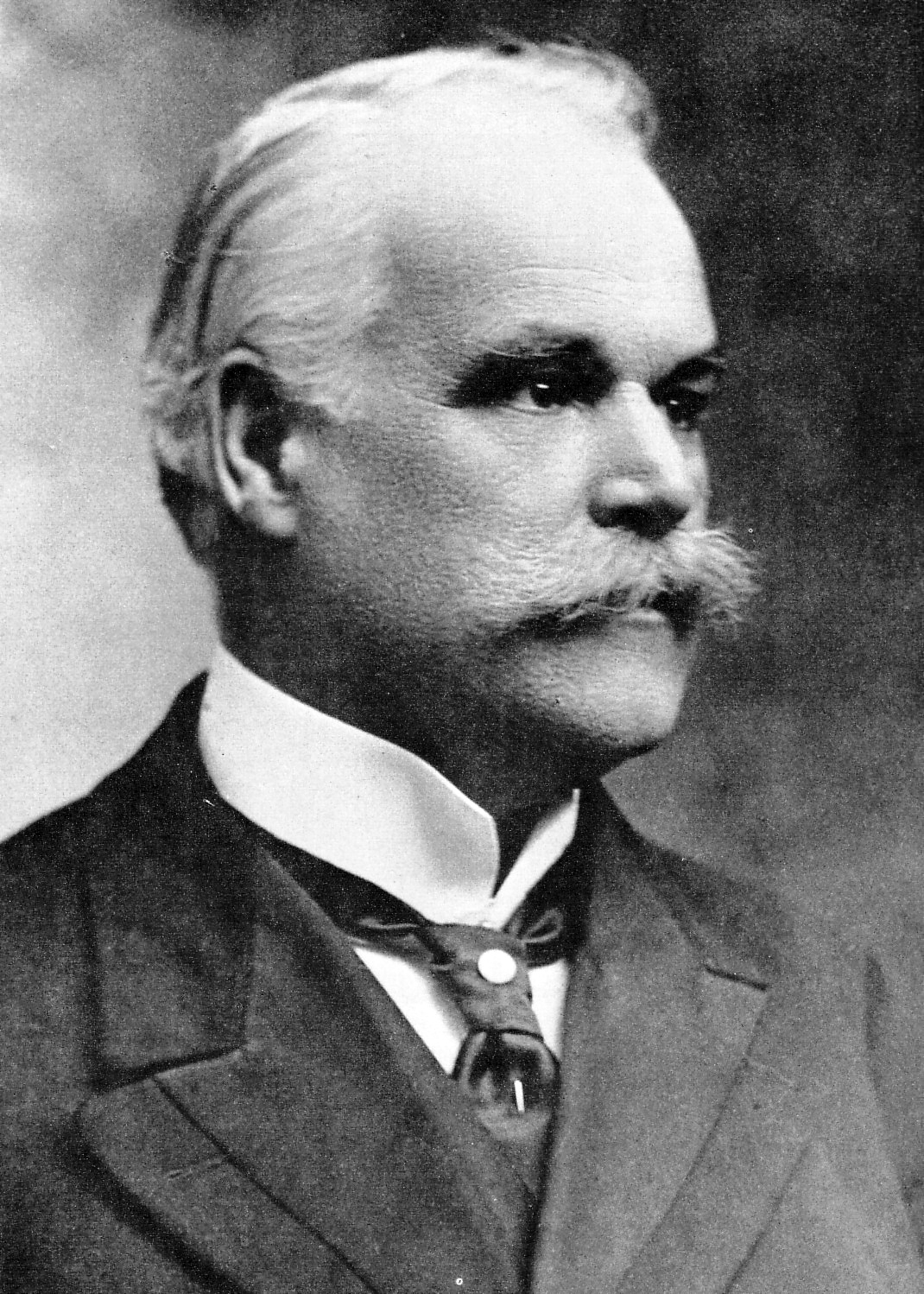
- Alphonse Desjardins, in 1913.
- Born: 5 November 1854; Lévis, Province of Canada, British Empire
- Died: 31 October 1920 (aged 65); Lévis, Quebec, Canada
- Occupation: founder Desjardins Group
- Spouse: Dorimène Roy Desjardins

Gabriel-Alphonse Desjardins (French pronunciation: [ɡabʁijɛl alfɔ̃s deʒaʁdɛ̃]; November 5, 1854 – October 31, 1920), born in Levis, Canada East was the co-founder of the Caisses Populaires Desjardins (today Desjardins Group), a forerunner of North American credit unions and community banks. For his contribution to the advancement of agriculture in the province of Quebec, he was posthumously inducted to the Agricultural Hall of Fame of Quebec in 1994.

== Early life ==
Gabriel-Alphonse Desjardins was a journalist at L'écho and Le Canadien until 1879. He was publisher of Débats de la législature du Québec from 1879 to 1890, and French-language parliamentary stenographer at the House of Commons of Canada from 1892 to 1917.

== Start of caisses populaires ==
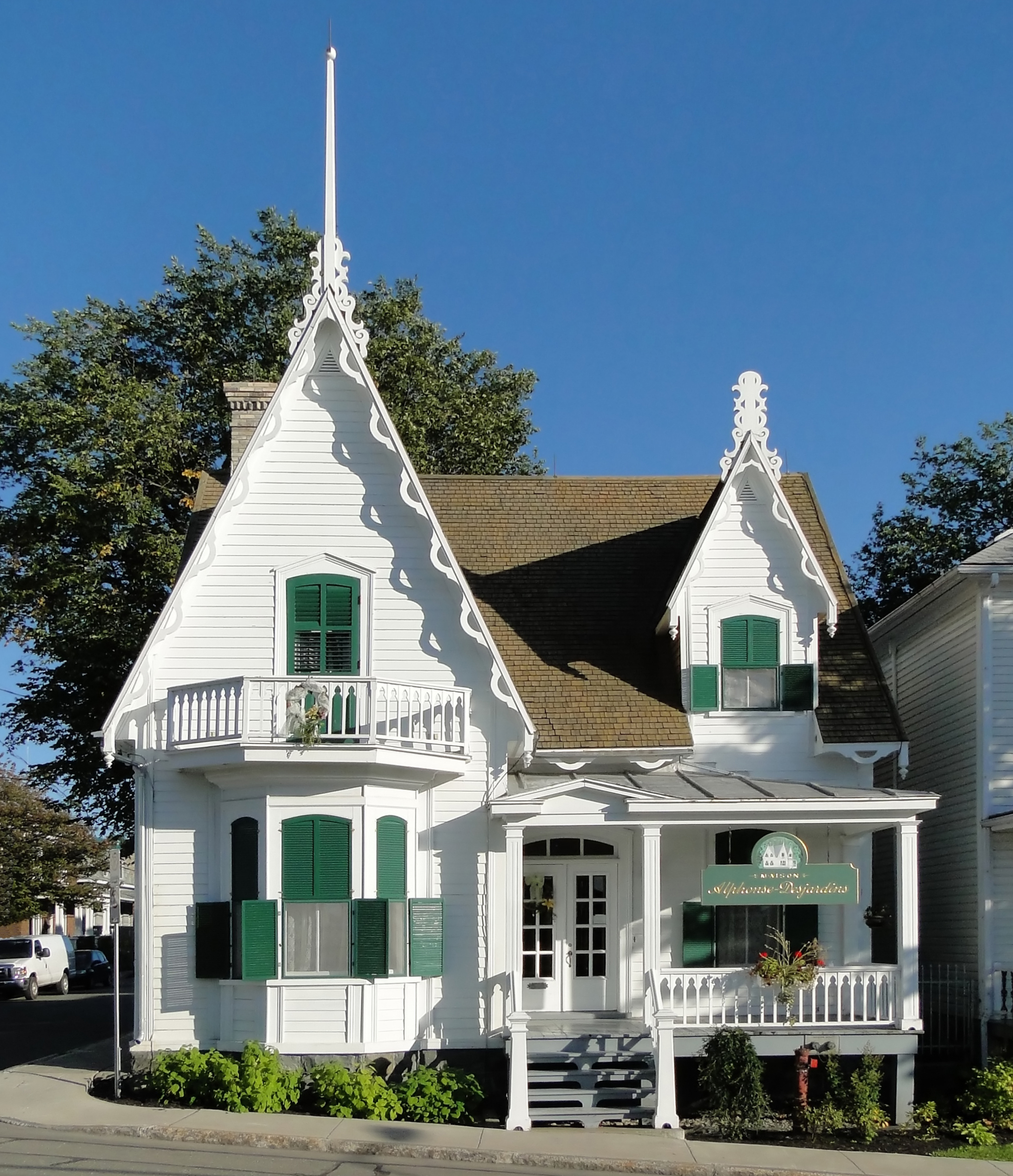
Alphonse Desjardins' house in Lévis

In 1897 Desjardins became increasingly concerned with the problem of usury and undertook three years of careful research and correspondence with the founders of cooperative savings and credit movements in Europe. On December 6, 1900, Desjardins and his wife, Dorimène Roy Desjardins, co-founded the first Caisse d'épargne Desjardins in Lévis and opened for business the following month. Later renamed Caisses populaires Desjardins (and today Desjardins Group), the organization was a forerunner of current North American credit unions.

Caisse populaire is a synthesis of four popular savings and credit systems established in Germany, Italy and France: the Schulze-Delitzsch banks and Raiffeisen credit co-operatives (both later integrated into the German Cooperative Financial Group), the Luzzatti popular banks, and the caisses d'épargne. Desjardins stayed in close contact with many of the founders of the European co-operative movement throughout his life.

From 1900 to 1906, Desjardins founded just three other caisses populaires: Lauzon (1902), Hull (1903), and Saint-Malo, Québec (1905). After failing to get a federal law passed in Ottawa that would provide a Canadian-wide framework for more such organizations, Desjardins turned his efforts, with the collaboration of journalists and priests, to founding more caisses. During the 1907-1914 period, Desjardins personally founded 146 caisses.

At the time of his death in 1920, there were 187 caisses populaires in Québec (30,000 members and total assets of nearly $6 million), 24 in Ontario and 9 in the United States.

Alphonse and Dorimène Desjardins' home, where the first caisse populaire was launched, is now a center dedicated to his memory and has been visited by over 178,000 people from 115 countries since its opening in 1982.

== See also ==
- Dorimène Roy Desjardins
- Desjardins Group
- History of credit unions
