= Beauce-Etchemin School Board =

School board in Saint-Georges, Quebec, Canada

Coordinates: 46.7487°N 71.2434°W

Beauce-Etchemin School Board Commission scolaire de la Beauce-Etchemin

Location
- Beauce Quebec; Canada

District information
- Motto: French: Ensemble vers l'avenir
- Established: July 1, 1998; 27 years ago
- Closed: June 15, 2020

Other information
- Website: www.csbe.qc.ca at the Wayback Machine (archived 2019-07-03)

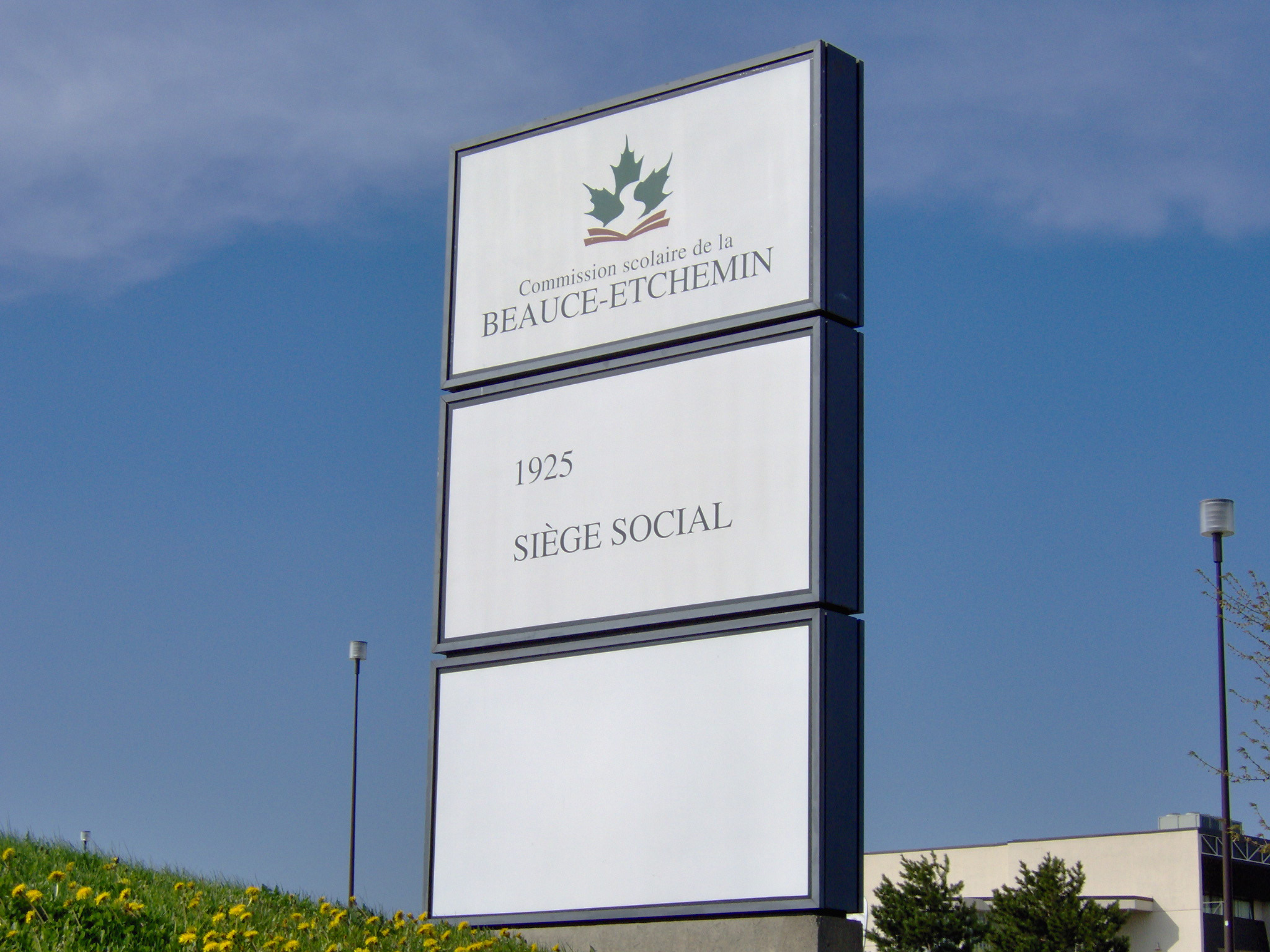
Headquarters of the Beauce-Etchemin School Board

The Beauce-Etchemin School Board (la Commission scolaire de la Beauce-Etchemin) is a former school board that was dissolved on June 15, 2020, it had its headquarters in Saint-Georges, Quebec. The last Director-General of the School Board was Camil Turmel as of June 26, 2006.

== Administration ==
It covers fifty-five municipalities and is divided into seven sectors:

- Sector des Abénaquis
- Sector des Appalaches
- Sector Bélanger
- Sector Benoît-Vachon
- Sector Saint-François
- Sector Sartigan
- Sector Veilleux

The slogan of the School Board in French is "Ensemble vers l'avenir" which translates as "Together towards the future". The slogan means that education is the foundation upon which we can build upon towards a better and brighter future for all generations.
