= Dejardin =

Dejardin is a surname. Notable people with the surname include:

- Ian Dejardin (born 1955), British museum director and art historian
- Joseph Dejardin (1873–1932), Belgian trade unionist and politician
- Lucie Dejardin (1875–1945), Belgian politician

== See also ==
- Desjardin (disambiguation)
- Desjardins (disambiguation)
