= École secondaire les Etchemins =

Location
- 3724, avenue des Églises; Charny, Quebec, G6X 1X4; Canada
- Coordinates: 46.7204°N 71.2665°W

Information
- Founded: 1969
- School board: Commission scolaire des Navigateurs
- Principal: Sonia Bédard
- Language: French
- Website: www.esle.qc.ca

École secondaire les Etchemins (ESLE) is a French-language high school in Charny, Quebec, Canada operated by the Commission scolaire des Navigateurs school board. The principal is Sonia Bédard. The school includes the Salle Louis-Philippe Arcand auditorium.

In 2016, Yvan Girouard, a teacher at École secondaire les Etchemins, was the recipient of the Prime Minister's Awards for Teaching Excellence.

In 1994 and 1996, Chau Ly-Hai, a grade 11 chemistry teacher at École secondaire les Etchemins, was the recipient of the Prime Minister's Awards for Teaching Excellence.
