= Prime Minister's Awards for Teaching Excellence =

Prime Minister's Award for Teaching Excellence
- Awarded for: Exemplary teaching
- Country: Canada
- Presented by: Prime Minister of Canada
- Reward: $5,000
- First award: 1993
- Website: Official website

The Prime Minister's Award for Teaching Excellence are awarded by the Prime Minister of Canada to exceptional Canadian elementary and secondary school teachers. It is the most prestigious prize awarded to a teacher in Canada.

Over 1,500 educators have received this award since its inception in 1993. Awards are conferred in two degrees, an award of Excellence (which is personally delivered by the Prime Minister), and an award of merit, which is delivered by local politicians in their communities.

== Description ==
Recipients of the Prime Minister's Awards for Teaching Excellence are recognized for their "leadership and exemplary teaching practices" and for their commitment to enabling students to gain knowledge and skills needed for future success.

Recipients of the award have demonstrated excellence in the following five areas:

- Innovative and exemplary teaching practices.
- Digital literacy and the use of information and communications technologies in the classroom.
- Student skills development.
- Student achievement and participation.
- Teacher commitment and leadership.

The award can honour a single teacher or a team of up to three teachers. Principals are eligible if they teach 2.5 days per week in a classroom setting.

Nominees for the award must be certified to teach in a public or private school in Canada; a Canadian citizen or permanent resident; teach full or part-time; and have three years teaching experience.

Canadian Prime Minister Justin Trudeau said:

I am exceptionally proud of having been a teacher. Regardless of whatever other job titles I hold over the course of my life, I will first and foremost be a teacher. That is why I was particularly delighted to present this year's Prime Minister's Awards for Teaching Excellence and Excellence in Early Childhood Education.

== Prize ==
The award comes with a $5,000 prize, which must be spent on professional development or teaching-related activities or resources.
