= Charny, Quebec =

Coordinates: 46°43′N 71°16′W

Charny
- Former city
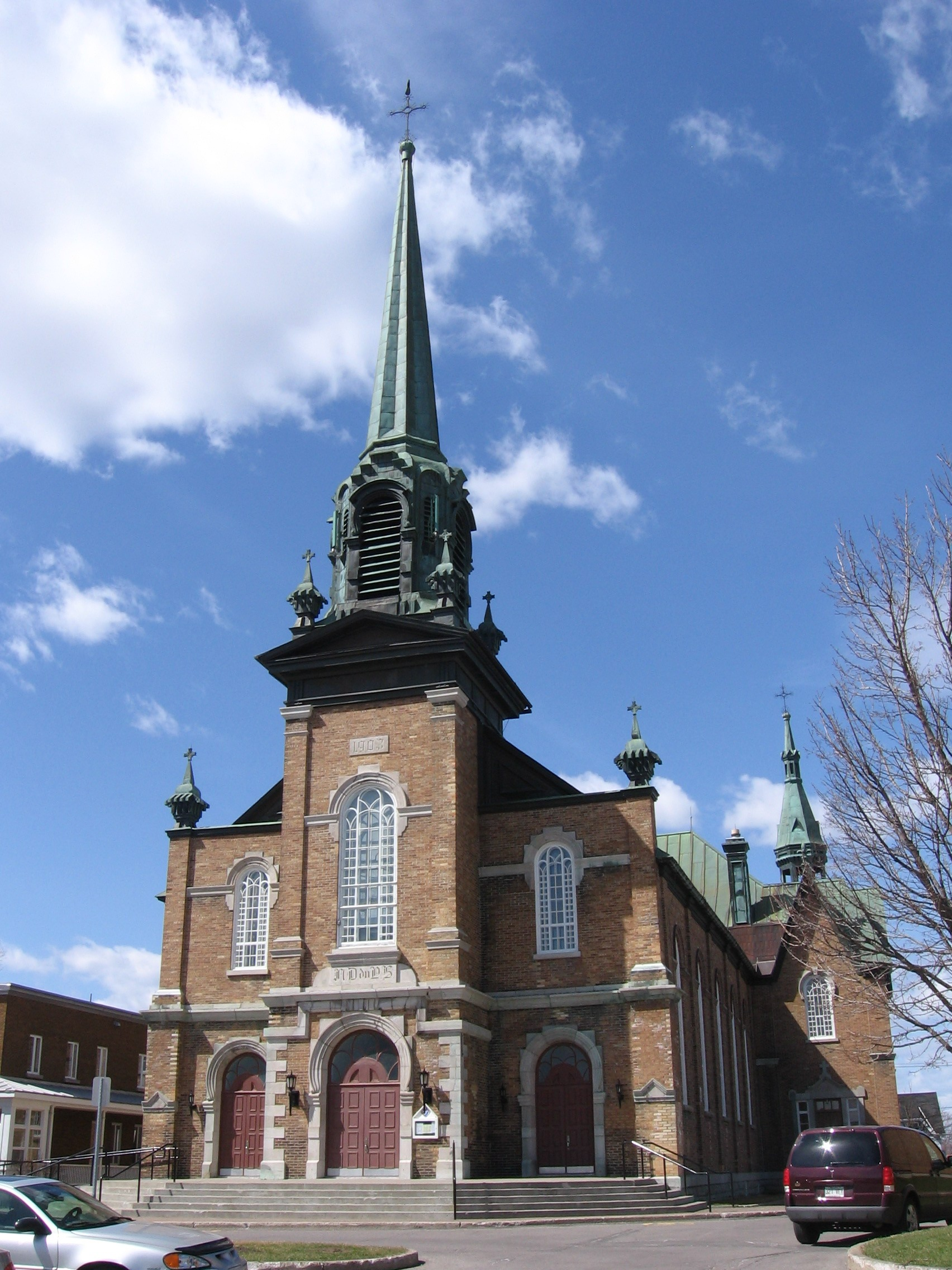
- Church
- Interactive map of Charny
- Country: Canada
- Province: Quebec
- MRC: Lévis
- Established: 1903

Government
  - Type: Municipality
  - Mayor: Gilles Lehouillier

Area
  - Total: 8.078 km^{2} (3.119 sq mi)

Population (2011)^{[1]}
  - Total: 10,083
- Time zone: UTC-5 (EST)
  - Summer (DST): UTC-4 (EDT)

Charny (French pronunciation: [ʃaʁni]) is a district (secteur) within the Les Chutes-de-la-Chaudière-Est borough of the city of Lévis, Quebec. It is located on the south shore of the St. Lawrence River, south of Quebec City. Formerly an independent city, Charny was merged with Lévis on January 1, 2002.

== History ==
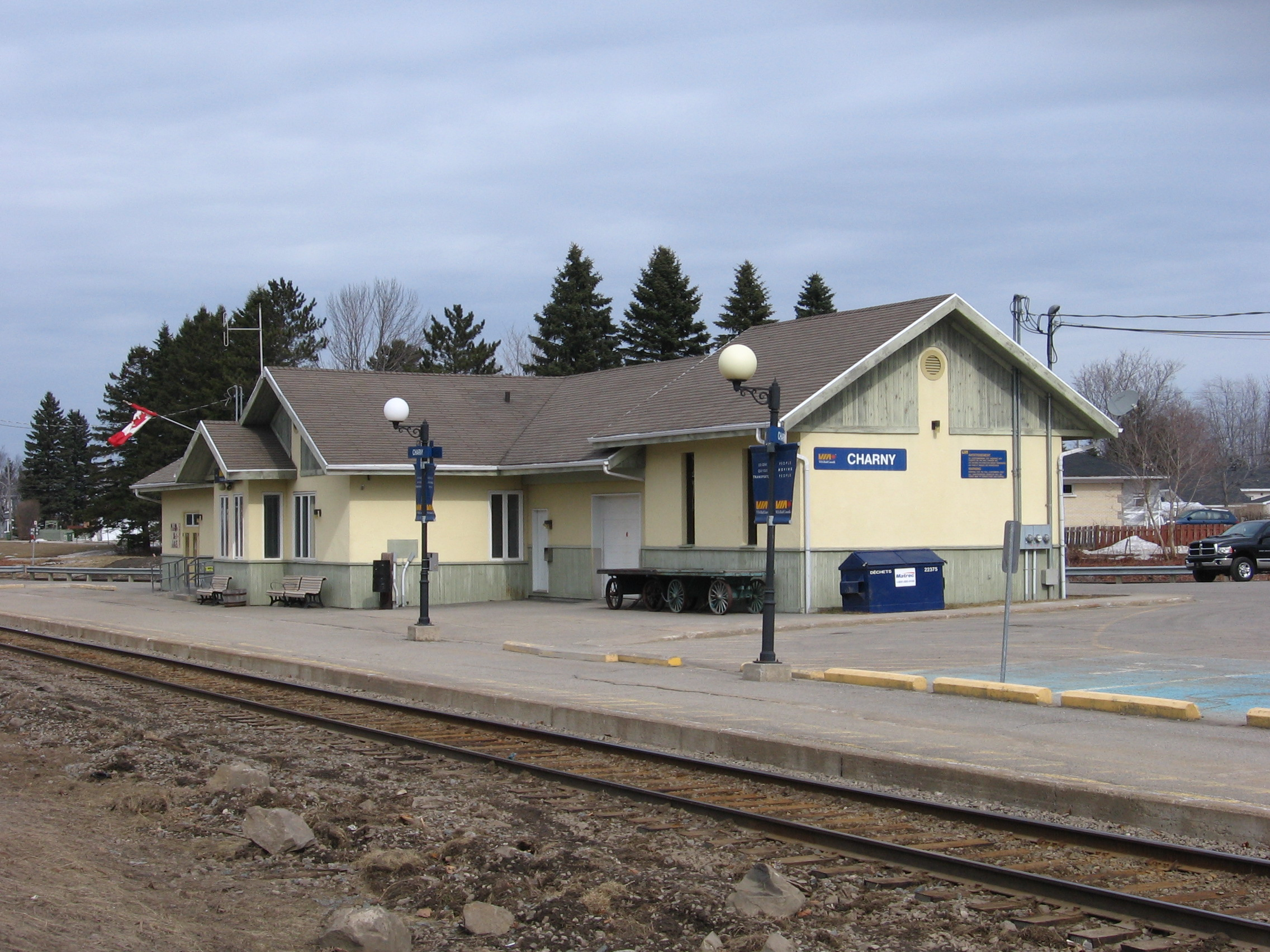
Via Rail's Charny railway station

Over the last century, Charny has been tremendously influenced socially and economically by the Canadian National Railway which maintains a major national train yard in the town, Joffre Yard. The roundhouse in the yard was designated a National Historic Site of Canada in 1992.

Charny expanded in population during the late 1980s and early 1990s when new neighbourhoods were surveyed and houses were built.

Charny has reached regional exposure many times over the last twenty years struggling with Alex Couture Inc., a plant which buys animal corpses in order to recycle them, producing salable by-products. The plant generated bad smells and odours throughout the city. The plant has installed filters to screen out any odours.

There is a waterfall in the Charny district of Lévis, Quebec, along the Chaudière River. Known as Chaudière Falls, it is one of the river's most prominent natural features. The falls provide a scenic setting for visitors, while a pedestrian suspension footbridge offers views of the waterfall and allows visitors to cross the river toward the Saint-Rédempteur district. The footbridge is suspended approximately 23 metres above the river and forms part of the trail network in Parc des Chutes-de-la-Chaudière.

== Demographics ==
Population according to 2006 Canadian census:

- Population: 10,367
- % Change 2001-2006: -1.3
- Dwellings: 4,686
- Density per km^{2}: 1,284.6
- Area per km^{2}: 8.07

== Education ==
Charny is within the Commission scolaire des Navigateurs, which operates the École secondaire les Etchemins.
