= Les Chutes-de-la-Chaudière-Est, Lévis, Quebec =

Borough of Lévis, Quebec, Canada

Coordinates: 46.703°N 71.224°W

Les Chutes-de-la-Chaudière-Est (French pronunciation: [le ʃyt də la ʃodjɛʁ ɛst]) is a borough of the city of Lévis, Quebec. It was created on January 1, 2002.

It corresponds to the eastern part of the former Les Chutes-de-la-Chaudière Regional County Municipality.

It has four districts, corresponding to former municipalities:

- Charny
- Saint-Romuald
- Saint-Jean-Chrysostome
- Sainte-Hélène-de-Breakeyville
