= Saint-Joseph-de-la-Pointe-De Lévy, Lévis =

Coordinates: 46.8000°N 71.1333°W

Saint-Joseph-de-la-Pointe-De Lévy (French pronunciation: [sɛ̃ ʒozɛf də la pwɛ̃t də levi]) is a district (secteur) within the Desjardins borough of the city of Lévis, Quebec.

Prior to its 2002 merger into the city of Lévis, it was a parish municipality, whose name was written as Saint-Joseph-de-la-Pointe-de-Lévy. It was also more colloquially known as Saint-Joseph-de-Lévis.

Population: 1,141 (2006)

== 1890 train accident ==
On December 17, 1890, a passenger train derailed when a bridge failed. Several passengers and crew members on the train were killed.
