= Pintendre, Quebec =

Coordinates: 46°46′6.5″N 71°7′44.9″W

Pintendre
- Former municipality
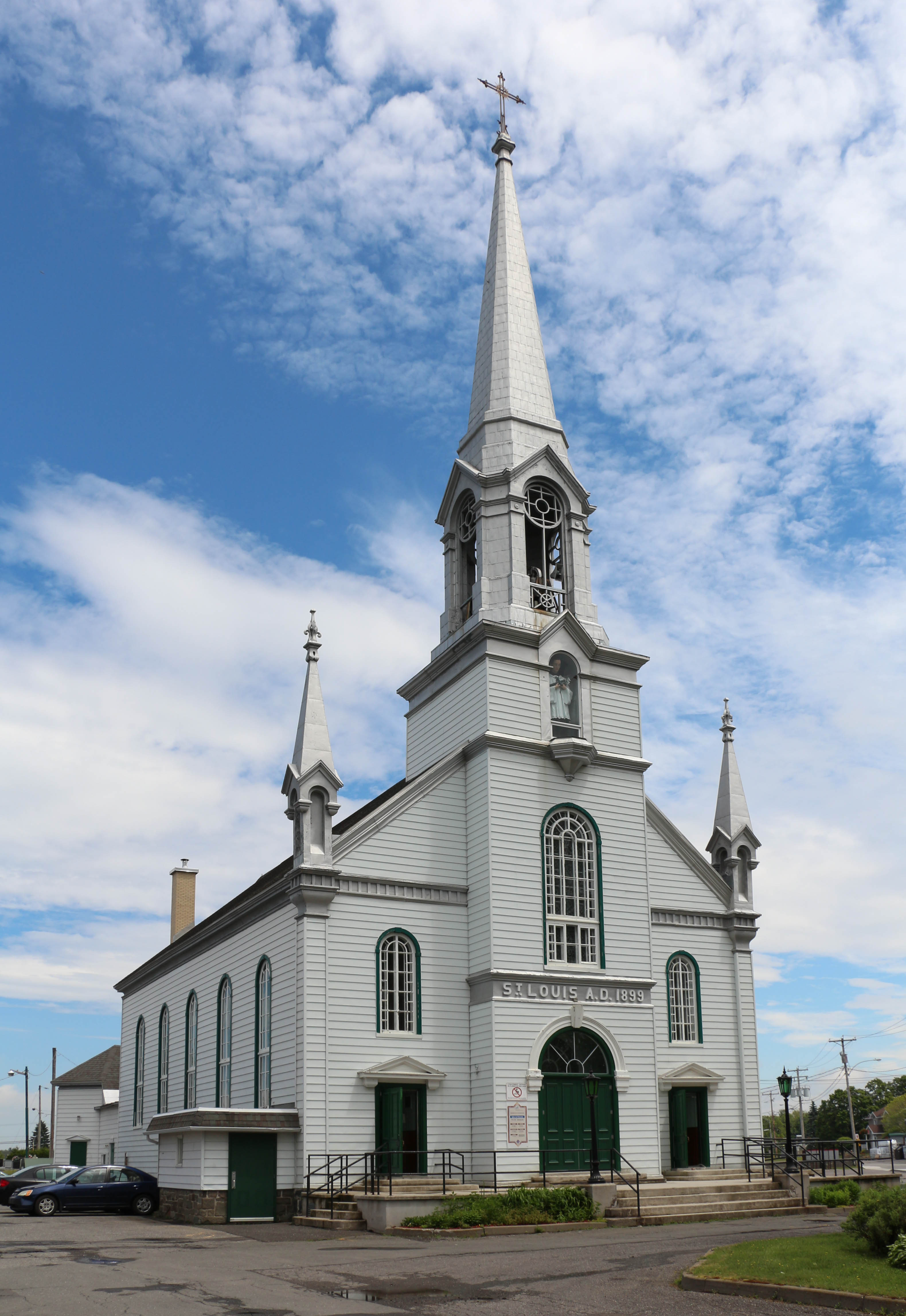
- Saint-Louis-de-Gonzague Church
- Interactive map of Pintendre
- Country: Canada
- Province: Quebec
- MRC: Lévis
- Established: 1899

Government
  - Type: City
  - Mayor: Gilles Lehouillier

Area
  - Total: 43.13 km^{2} (16.65 sq mi)

Population (2006)^{[1]}
  - Total: 6,334
- Time zone: UTC-5 (EST)
  - Summer (DST): UTC-4 (EDT)

Pintendre (French pronunciation: [pɛ̃tɑ̃dʁ]) is a district within the Desjardins borough of the City of Lévis, Quebec; It is located south of central Lévis along both side of Route 173.

Prior to January 1, 2002, it was an independent municipality.

Pintendre is the home of Pintendre Auto, a company recognized in 1990 by the Automotive Recyclers' Association as the best structured auto recycling facility in the world (chosen from 1800 other auto recycling corporate entities located in 14 countries).

According to the Canada 2006 Census:

- Population: 6,334
- % Change (2001–2006): +4.4
- Dwellings: 2,354
- Area (km^{2}): 43.13 km^{2}
- Density (persons per km^{2}): 146.9
