= Commission scolaire des Navigateurs =

School district in Quebec, Canada

Coordinates: 46°07′41″N 70°39′46″W

Commission scolaire des Navigateurs was a French-language school district in Lévis, Quebec, Canada. Its address was in Saint-Romuald, a former town annexed to Lévis. The chair of the school board was Jérôme Demers, and the director general was Esther Lemieux.

In January 2007, the school board adopted a food policy which banned "junk food" such as poutine and hot dogs from school cafeterias.

In 2020, the school board was replaced by the centre de services scolaire des Navigateurs.

== Schools ==
It operated the following schools.

=== High schools ===
- École secondaire de l'Aubier
- École secondaire Beaurivage
- École secondaire Champagnat
- École secondaire de l'Envol
- École secondaire de l'Horizon
- École de la Clé-du-Boisé
- École secondaire Guillaume-Couture
- École secondaire les Etchemins
- École secondaire Pamphile-Le May
- École Pointe-Lévy
- École Îlot des Appalaches
- Centre de formation en entreprise et récupération (CFER)

=== Elementary schools ===
- École Belleau
- École Charles-Rodrigue
- École Clair-Soleil
- École de l'Alizé
- École de l'Amitié
- École de l'Auberivière
- École de l'Épervière
- École de l'Odyssée
- École de la Berge
- École de la Caravelle (Dosquet)
- École de la Caravelle (Joly)
- École de la Caravelle (Saint-Flavien)
- École de la Chanterelle
- École de la Clé-d'Or
- École de la Clé-du-Boisé
- École de la Falaise
- École de la Nacelle
- École de la Rose-des-Vents
- École de la Ruche
- École de la Source
- École de Taniata
- École Desjardins
- École des Moussaillons
- École des Mousserons
- École des Petits-Cheminots
- École du Bac
- École du Boisé
- École du Chêne
- École du Grand-Fleuve Pavillon du Méandre
- École du Grand-Fleuve Pavillon Maria-Dominique
- École du Grand-Voilier
- École du Ruisseau
- École du Tournesol
- École Étienne-Chartier
- École Gagnon
- École La Martinière
- École La Mennais
- École Notre-Dame
- École Notre-Dame-d'Etchemin
- École des Quatre-Vents
- École Plein-Soleil
- École Saint-Dominique
- École Saint-Joseph
- École Saint-Louis-de-France
- École Sainte-Hélène
- École Sainte-Marie
- École Sainte-Thérèse

as well as the Centre de formation en entreprise et récupération and adult education programs.
