= Lévis =

- City
- Ville de Lévis
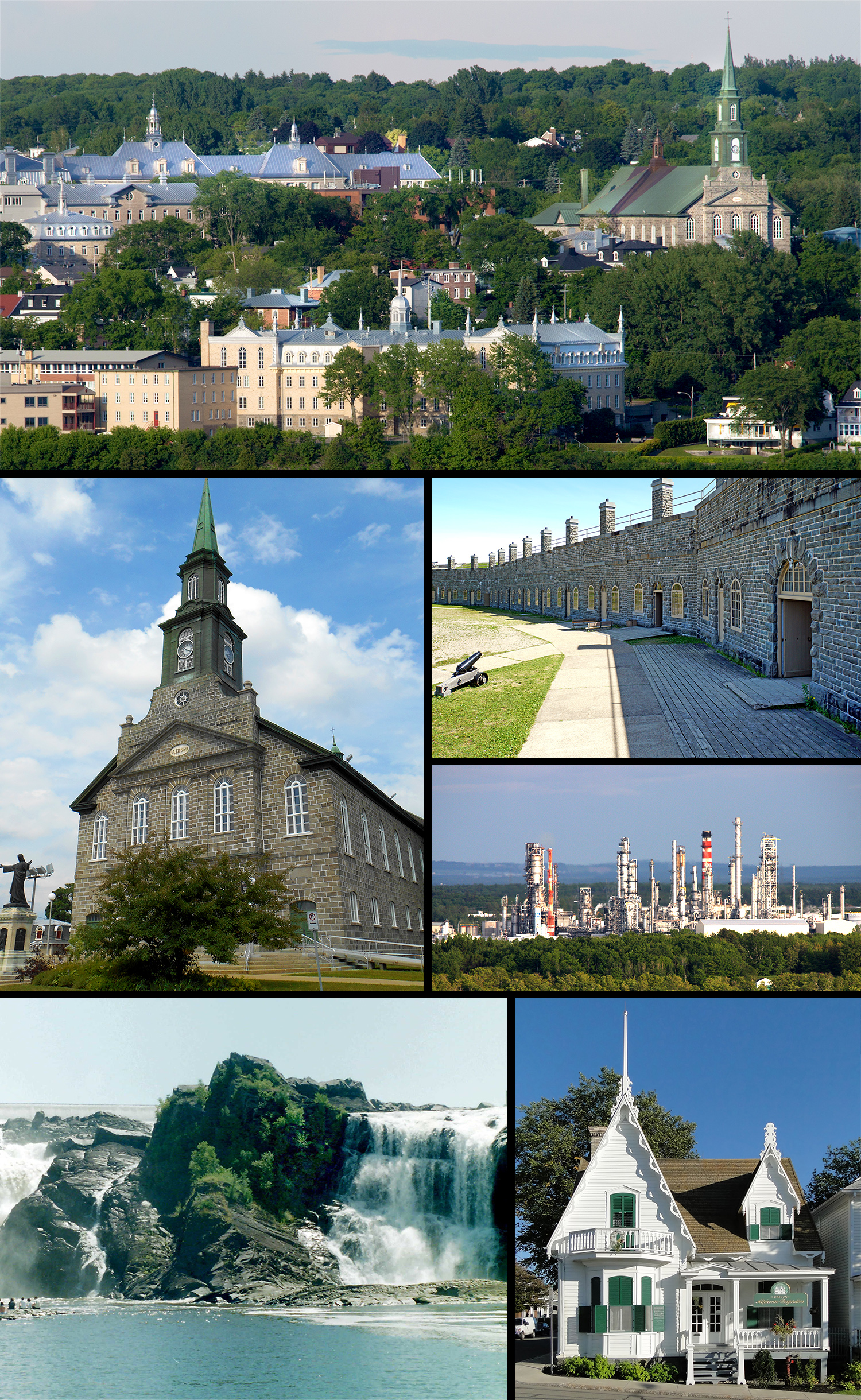
- From top, left to right: View of Lévis, Notre-Dame-de-la-Victoire Church, Lévis Forts National Historic Site, Ultramar's Jean-Gaulin Refinery, Chaudière Falls, home of Alphonse Desjardins

- Flag Coat of arms
- Motto: Toujours à l'Avant-Garde
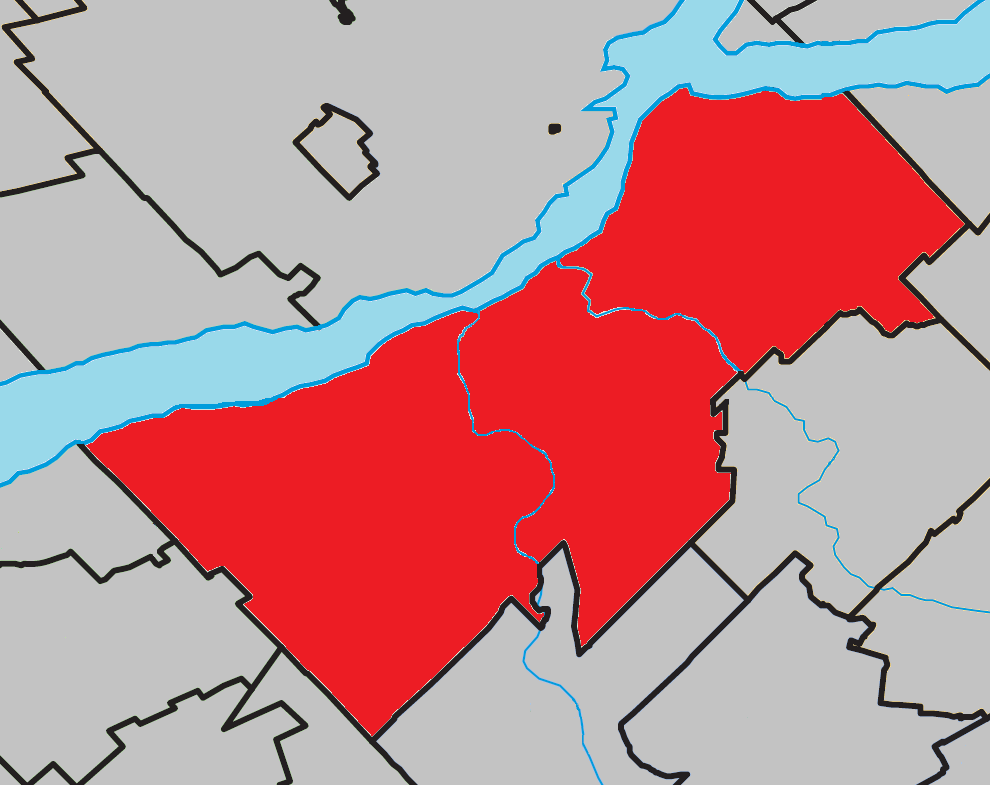
- Location with surrounding municipalities.

- Location in southern Quebec. Lévis (Canada)
- Coordinates: 46°45′29″N 71°14′25″W
- Country: Canada
- Province: Quebec
- Region: Chaudière-Appalaches
- RCM: None
- Constituted: January 1, 2002
- Boroughs: List: Desjardins; Les Chutes-de-la-Chaudière-Est; Les Chutes-de-la-Chaudière-Ouest

Government
  - Type: Lévis City Council
  - Mayor: Steven Blaney
  - MPs: Dominique Vien (C); Jacques Gourde (C)
  - MNAs: Karine Laflamme (C); Dominique Dumas (C); Éric Duhaime (C)

Area
  - Total: 497.00 km^{2} (191.89 sq mi)
  - Land: 448.07 km^{2} (173.00 sq mi)

Population (2021)
  - Total: 149,683 (33rd)
  - Rank: 7th in Quebec
  - Density: 334.1/km^{2} (865/sq mi)
  - Change 2016-2021: ▲4.4%
  - Dwellings: 68,205
- Time zone: UTC−05:00 (EST)
  - Summer (DST): UTC−04:00 (EDT)
- Postal code(s): G6C, G6J, G6K, G6V to G6Z, G7A
- Area codes: 418 and 581
- Website: www.ville.levis.qc.ca

Lévis (French pronunciation: [levi]) is a city in eastern Quebec, Canada, located on the south shore of the St. Lawrence River, opposite Quebec City. A ferry links Old Quebec with Old Lévis, and two bridges, the Quebec Bridge and the Pierre-Laporte Bridge, connect western Lévis with Quebec City.

The population in 2021 was 149,683. Its current incarnation was founded on January 1, 2002, as the result of a merger among ten cities, including the older city of Lévis founded in 1861.

Lévis is also the name of a territory equivalent to a regional county municipality (TE) and census division (CD) of Quebec, coextensive with the city of Lévis. Its geographical code is 25 as a census division, and 251 as an RCM-equivalent territory.

== History ==
First Nations and prehistoric indigenous peoples settled in this area for thousands of years due to its ideal location at the confluence of the Chaudière and the St. Lawrence rivers. Many archeological sites reveal evidence of human occupation dating to 10,000 BP. Some historians theorize that Pointe-Lévy could have been one of the main centres of Native American population development in what became the province of Québec.

In 1636, approximately 28 years after the French founded Quebec City, the seignory of Lauzon was founded on the eastern part of this territory. In the following years, other seignories were founded near the St. Lawrence River. Pointe-Lévy was primarily developed as an agricultural domain, in which several land-owners ("Seigneurs") controlled their part of land in a medieval feudal system.

The land of the Lauzon seignory remained unoccupied until 1647, when Guillaume Couture became the first French settler installed by Quebec City. Couture was serving as the first Administrator, Chief Magistrate, Captain of the Militia, and member of the Sovereign Council; he was widely considered a hero among colonists in New France. Couture, however, was not the first 'Seigneur' of the Lauzon Seignory, as the land had been previously owned by Jean de Lauson (French Governor between 1651 and 1657).

During the Seven Years' War, in the summer of 1759, British General James Wolfe established a camp in the territory of Pointe-Lévy and laid siege to Quebec City. The siege succeeded. After being under bombardment for three months and fighting the English in the battle on the Plains of Abraham in front of the walls, Quebec fell to the British. During this time, Pointe-Lévy served as the main encampment of the British army in the Quebec area. The constant cannon firing between Quebec City and Pointe-Lévy discouraged both French and British ships from advancing further up the St. Lawrence, and reinforcements and supplies did not reach other major cities such as Montréal.

In 1763, after the English took over French territory east of the Mississippi River in North America, a jury convicted Marie-Josephte Corriveau, "la Corriveau", of murdering her husband with a pitch-fork and she was condemned to death. She was hanged in Quebec City, and the British displayed her body in a cage for several weeks in Saint-Joseph-de-la-Pointe-Lévy (old part of the former City of Lauzon). This was the first time they had used this practice in North America; it was reserved for persons found guilty of particularly heinous crimes. This punishment had been practised in England since the Middle Ages.

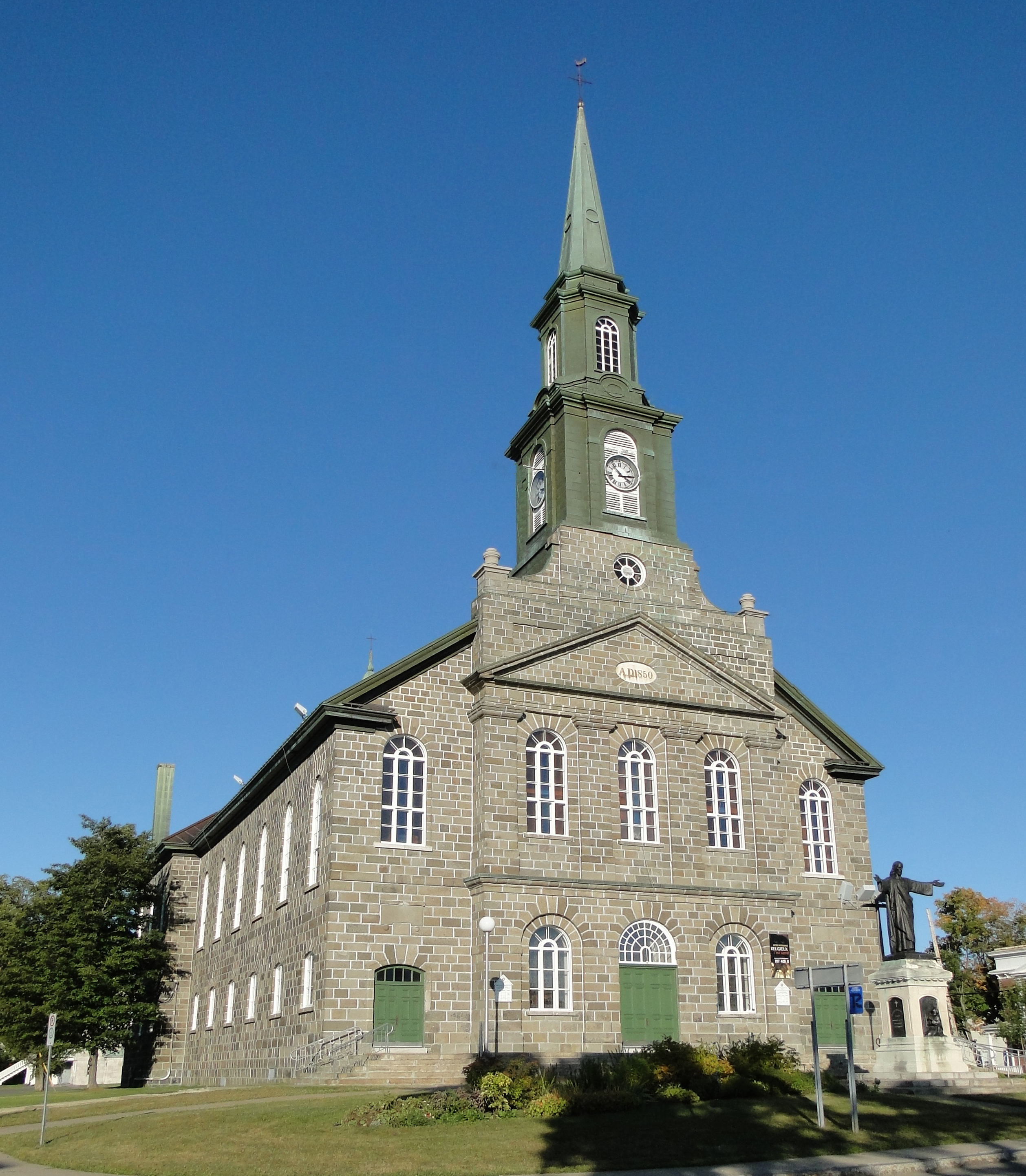
Notre-Dame-de-la-Victoire de Lévis Church, built in 1851

From 1854, the railroad was constructed to Pointe-Lévy; it became a major transportation centre for commerce and immigration. As it was located on the south shore of the St. Lawrence River, Pointe-Levy could be connected by rail to Ontario and the Maritime Provinces, as well as to Maine and all the United States.

Between 1865 and 1872, the British constructed three forts in order to protect the City of Quebec and its surroundings, from the threat of an American invasion in the aftermath of its civil war. The British had maintained relations with the Confederacy during the war and at times helped its ships evade the Union blockade, so feared retaliation. Those garrisons never had to serve their intended purpose. One of them, Fort-Chambly, still stands to this day and is open to the public.

The City of Lévis, named after the successor to Montcalm, the Chevalier de Lévis, was developed beginning in 1861. Its founder was Monsignor Joseph-David Déziel (1806–1882). As more settlements developed, there were changes among the municipalities in the territory of present-day Lévis; many were merged between 1861 and 2002, reflecting changes in governance. The Village of Pointe-Levy (or Saint-Joseph-de-la-Pointe-Lévy) was renamed as the Village of Lauzon in 1867 and incorporated as the City of Lauzon in 1910.

In the late 19th and beginning of the 20th century, Alphonse Desjardins pioneered the credit union movement, establishing the first caisse populaire in Lévis. He began developing what later became the Desjardins Group by travelling throughout Quebec and helping people in other cities start their own credit unions.

=== Legacy ===
On June 28, 1985 Canada Post issued "Fort No.1, Point Levis, Que.", one of 20 stamps in the "Forts Across Canada Series" (1983 and 1985). The stamps are perforated 12 1/2 x 13 mm and were printed by Ashton-Potter Limited, based on the designs by Rolf P. Harder.

== Geography ==
Lévis covers an area of 444 km^{2} (171 sq mi): 10% urban, 48% farmlands, 36% forests and 6% wetlands. In addition to the Saint Lawrence River, the Etchemin and Chaudière rivers also run through the city before ending their journey into the Saint Lawrence. The Chaudière River also boasts a waterfall with a suspended bridge, which can be accessed from Autoroute 73.

Lévis County existed until January 1982 when it was divided into Desjardins Regional County Municipality and Les Chutes-de-la-Chaudière Regional County Municipality.

On January 1, 2002, ten cities were merged by the Quebec provincial government to form the new city of Lévis. Previously, the former cities of Lauzon and Saint-David-de-l'Auberivière had been merged to Lévis in 1989. The regional county municipalities of which these cities were a part ceased to exist.

=== Boroughs ===
The new city was divided into three arrondissements or boroughs. Desjardins, Les Chutes-de-la-Chaudière-Ouest and Les Chutes-de-la-Chaudière-Est, which correspond to most of the territory of the former RCMs (however, Saint-Henri and Saint-Lambert-de-Lauzon remained independent and did not amalgamate into Lévis).

The ten former municipalities are today districts (secteurs) within the city; each of the three boroughs is composed of either three or four districts.

=== Former municipalities (10) ===
- Lévis (pre-2002 borders of the city)
- Charny
- Pintendre
- Sainte-Hélène-de-Breakeyville
- Saint-Étienne-de-Lauzon
- Saint-Jean-Chrysostome
- Saint-Joseph-de-la-Pointe-de-Lévy
- Saint-Nicolas
- Saint-Romuald
- Saint-Rédempteur

The pre-2002 Lévis had already merged with Lauzon and Saint-David-de-l'Auberivière in 1989.

Panoramic view of Lévis (2024)

=== Climate ===
Lévis has a humid continental climate (Köppen Climate Classification Dfb) with large variation between summer and winter. The city features two brief transition seasons (spring and autumn), while summers are warm and occasionally hot, and winters are long and very cold.

Climate data for Lévis, 1981–2010 normals, extremes 1970–present
Month	Jan	Feb	Mar	Apr	May	Jun	Jul	Aug	Sep	Oct	Nov	Dec	Year
Record high °C (°F)	13.0 (55.4)	16.5 (61.7)	16.5 (61.7)	29.5 (85.1)	32.8 (91.0)	35.0 (95.0)	35.0 (95.0)	33.5 (92.3)	33.5 (92.3)	26.0 (78.8)	23.0 (73.4)	14.5 (58.1)	35.0 (95.0)
Mean daily maximum °C (°F)	−7.5 (18.5)	−4.9 (23.2)	0.9 (33.6)	9.0 (48.2)	17.5 (63.5)	22.8 (73.0)	25.1 (77.2)	24.1 (75.4)	18.9 (66.0)	11.2 (52.2)	3.6 (38.5)	−3.7 (25.3)	9.7 (49.5)
Daily mean °C (°F)	−12.5 (9.5)	−10.2 (13.6)	−4.5 (23.9)	3.7 (38.7)	11.1 (52.0)	16.5 (61.7)	19.2 (66.6)	18.0 (64.4)	13.3 (55.9)	6.5 (43.7)	−0.2 (31.6)	−7.9 (17.8)	4.4 (39.9)
Mean daily minimum °C (°F)	−17.5 (0.5)	−15.5 (4.1)	−9.8 (14.4)	−1.5 (29.3)	4.6 (40.3)	10.2 (50.4)	13.2 (55.8)	12.0 (53.6)	7.5 (45.5)	1.7 (35.1)	−3.9 (25.0)	−12.0 (10.4)	−0.9 (30.4)
Record low °C (°F)	−37.0 (−34.6)	−35.0 (−31.0)	−33.0 (−27.4)	−20.0 (−4.0)	−6.0 (21.2)	−1.5 (29.3)	0.6 (33.1)	−1.1 (30.0)	−6.5 (20.3)	−10.0 (14.0)	−27.2 (−17.0)	−35.0 (−31.0)	−37.0 (−34.6)
Average precipitation mm (inches)	92.0 (3.62)	81.0 (3.19)	80.7 (3.18)	89.9 (3.54)	98.4 (3.87)	121.6 (4.79)	135.8 (5.35)	116.5 (4.59)	111.9 (4.41)	108.5 (4.27)	104.5 (4.11)	111.9 (4.41)	1,252.6 (49.31)
Average rainfall mm (inches)	19.5 (0.77)	14.7 (0.58)	30.4 (1.20)	73.8 (2.91)	98.0 (3.86)	121.6 (4.79)	135.8 (5.35)	116.5 (4.59)	111.9 (4.41)	104.8 (4.13)	73.9 (2.91)	30.1 (1.19)	930.9 (36.65)
Average snowfall cm (inches)	72.5 (28.5)	66.3 (26.1)	50.3 (19.8)	16.3 (6.4)	0.4 (0.2)	0.0 (0.0)	0.0 (0.0)	0.0 (0.0)	0.0 (0.0)	3.8 (1.5)	30.6 (12.0)	81.8 (32.2)	321.9 (126.7)
Average precipitation days (≥ 0.2 mm)	16.3	13.2	12.8	13.5	14.8	15.8	16.7	15.9	15.4	16.2	16.6	16.7	183.9
Average rainy days (≥ 0.2 mm)	2.7	2.2	5.2	11.6	14.8	15.8	16.7	15.9	15.4	15.8	11.8	3.8	131.6
Average snowy days (≥ 0.2 cm)	14.8	12.2	9.1	3.7	0.0	0.0	0.0	0.0	0.0	0.8	6.8	14.5	62.0
Source: Environment Canada[/https://climate.weather.gc.ca/climate_normals/results_1981_2010_e.html?climate_id=7020567&autofwd=1 "Beausejour"]. Canadian Climate Normals 1981–2010. Environment Canada. August 10, 2026.

== Demographics ==
Historical Census Data - Lévis, Quebec
Year	Pop.	±%
1991	39,452	—
1996	40,407	+2.4%
2001	40,926	+1.3%
2006	130,006	+217.7%
2011	138,769	+6.7%
2016	143,414	+3.3%
2021	149,683	+4.4%
In 2002, nine surrounding municipalities merged with Lévis.

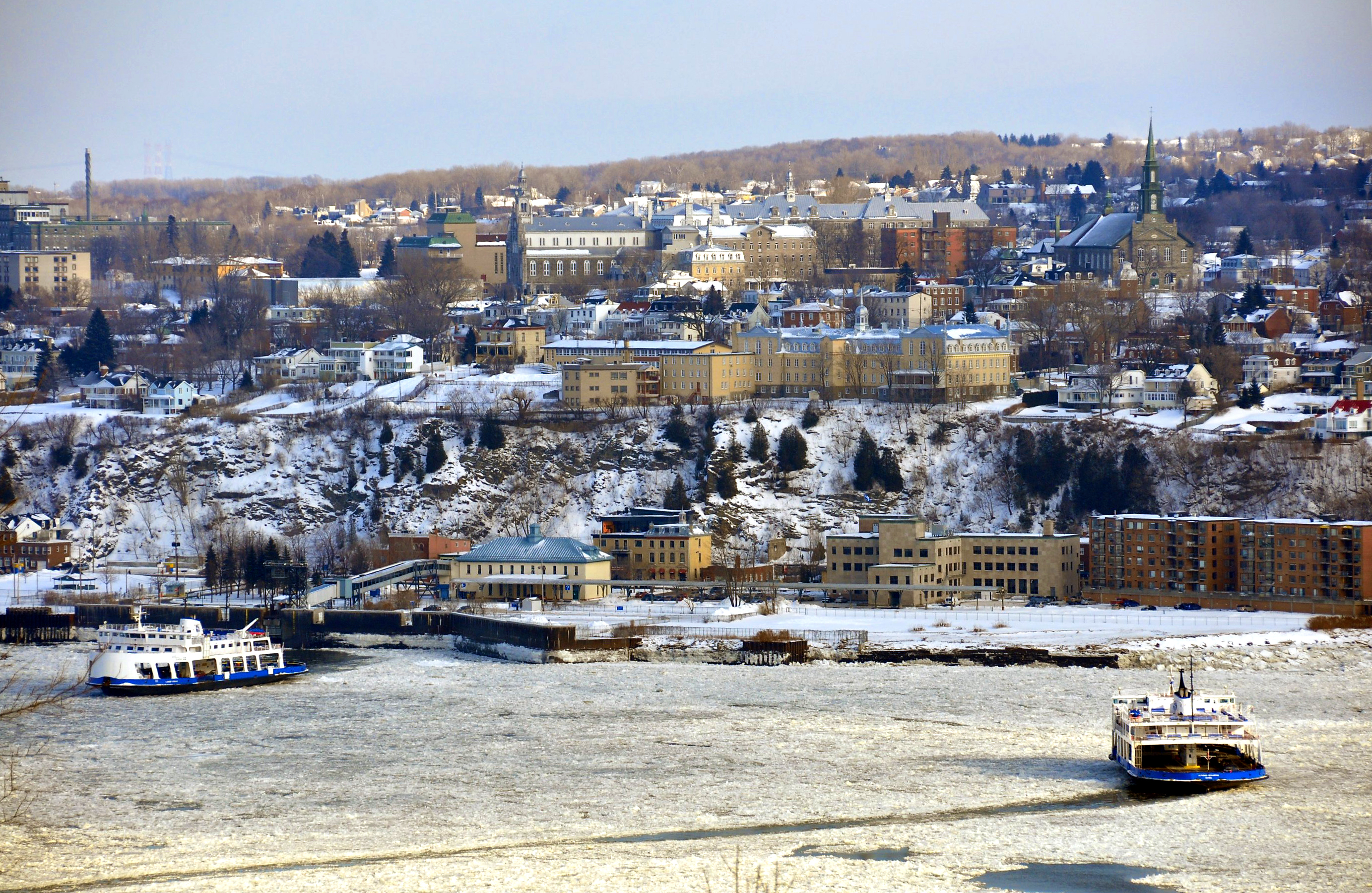
Lévis in winter

In the 2021 Census of Population conducted by Statistics Canada, Lévis had a population of 149,683 living in 65,751 of its 68,205 total private dwellings, a change of 4.4% from its 2016 population of 143,414. With a land area of 448.07 km^{2} (173.00 sq mi), it had a population density of 334.1/km^{2} (865.2/sq mi) in 2021.

Canada census – Lévis community profile

	2021	2016	2011
Population	149,683 (+4.4% from 2016)	143,414 (+3.3% from 2011)	138,769 (+6.7% from 2006)
Land area	448.07 km^{2} (173.00 sq mi)	449.05 km^{2} (173.38 sq mi)	449.31 km^{2} (173.48 sq mi)
Population density	334.1/km^{2} (865/sq mi)	319.4/km^{2} (827/sq mi)	308.8/km^{2} (800/sq mi)
Median age	44.0 (M: 42.8, F: 44.8)	42.3 (M: 41.3, F: 43.3)	40.7 (M: 39.6, F: 41.8)
Private dwellings	68,205 (total) 65,751 (occupied)	62,585 (total)	59,024 (total)
Median household income	$84,000	$65,055	$65,055

References: 2021 2016 2011

=== Ethnicity ===
The city is one of the most homogeneous in Canada: around 95% of the population is of European ancestry.

Panethnic groups in the City of Lévis (2001−2021)
Panethnic group	2021		2016		2011		2006		2001	
Panethnic group	Pop.	%	Pop.	%	Pop.	%	Pop.	%	Pop.	%
European (Note: Statistic includes all persons that did not make up part of a visible minority or an indigenous identity.)	138,465	94.69%	135,870	96.88%	133,155	98.03%	126,700	98.7%	39,905	99.25%
African	2,515	1.72%	1,035	0.74%	500	0.37%	310	0.24%	75	0.19%
Indigenous	1,945	1.33%	1,255	0.89%	745	0.55%	390	0.3%	90	0.22%
Middle Eastern (Note: Statistic includes total responses of "West Asian" and "Arab" under visible minority section on census.)	1,105	0.76%	610	0.43%	240	0.18%	145	0.11%	15	0.04%
Latin American	875	0.6%	615	0.44%	340	0.25%	265	0.21%	25	0.06%
East Asian (Note: Statistic includes total responses of "Chinese", "Korean", and "Japanese" under visible minority section on census.)	520	0.36%	445	0.32%	420	0.31%	235	0.18%	45	0.11%
Southeast Asian (Note: Statistic includes total responses of "Filipino" and "Southeast Asian" under visible minority section on census.)	485	0.33%	250	0.18%	290	0.21%	195	0.15%	45	0.11%
South Asian	160	0.11%	80	0.06%	30	0.02%	80	0.06%	10	0.02%
Other (Note: Statistic includes total responses of "Visible minority, n.i.e." and "Multiple visible minorities" under visible minority section on census.)	175	0.12%	95	0.07%	105	0.08%	30	0.02%	0	0%
Total responses	146,235	97.7%	140,245	97.79%	135,835	97.89%	128,370	98.74%	40,205	98.24%
Total population	149,683	100%	143,414	100%	138,769	100%	130,006	100%	40,926	100%

- Note: Totals greater than 100% due to multiple origin responses.

=== Language ===
Over 95% of residents speak French as their mother tongue.

== Economy ==
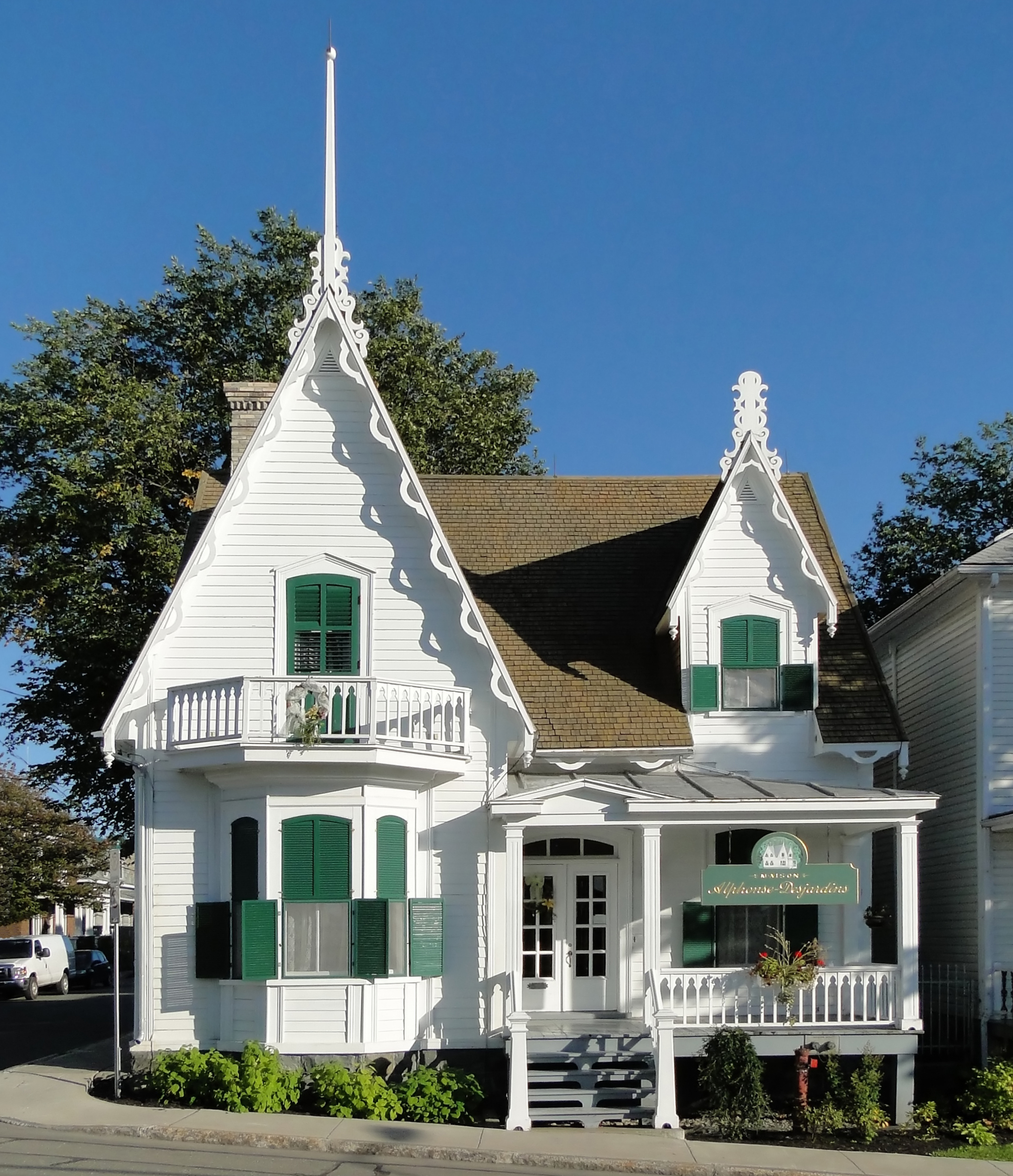
First Caisse Populaire in Lévis

Although a relatively small city, Lévis is not a typical suburb. The presence of several large employers has allowed many citizens to both live and work in Lévis. It is home to Valero's Jean-Gaulin refinery, one of the largest in eastern Canada, Frito-Lay and Davie Shipbuilding are located in the borough of Lauzon (former city). The Desjardins Group, as well as its subsidiary Desjardins Financial Security, are headquartered in the city. The founder, Alphonse Desjardins, lived in Lévis and, with his wife, Dorimène Roy Desjardins, ran the first Caisse Populaire (similar to a credit union) from their home. The city is also a major agricultural business research and development centre. More high technology companies, such as Creaform (3D), have been established in Lévis.

Lévis is home to the enclosed regional shopping mall Les Galeries Chagnon which has 106 stores.

Many small business and entertainment developed in the city during the last decade and finalized the transformation from a Quebec City suburb into a small city.

== Education ==
Commission scolaire des Navigateurs operates Francophone public schools.

There are many schools of different levels, including the Cégep de Lévis and a UQAR campus (Université du Québec à Rimouski).

== Notable people ==
- Alphonse Desjardins – co-operator, founder of the Desjardins Group
- Jean Carignan – fiddler
- Céline Bonnier – actress
- Charles Milliard – politician
- Ariane Moffatt – singer
- Pierre-Luc Létourneau-Leblond – hockey player for the New Jersey Devils
- Kalyna Roberge – speed skater
- Charles Hamelin – short-track speed skater
- Claude Auger – 34th Canadian Surgeon General
- Louise Carrier – Artist
- Marie-Andrée Leclerc - Serial killer

== See also ==
- Levis De-Icer
- List of regional county municipalities and equivalent territories in Quebec
- Municipal reorganization in Quebec
