= Les Chutes-de-la-Chaudière-Ouest, Lévis, Quebec =

Coordinates: 46.6500°N 71.3000°W

Les Chutes-de-la-Chaudière-Ouest (French pronunciation: [le ʃyt də la ʃodjɛʁ wɛst]) is a borough of the city of Lévis, Quebec. It was created on January 1, 2002.

It corresponds to the western part of the former Les Chutes-de-la-Chaudière Regional County Municipality.

It has three districts, corresponding to former municipalities:

- Saint-Étienne-de-Lauzon
- Saint-Nicolas
- Saint-Rédempteur
