= Saint-Jean-Chrysostome, Lévis, Quebec =

Coordinates: 46°43′4″N 71°11′52″W

Saint-Jean-Chrysostome
- Borough
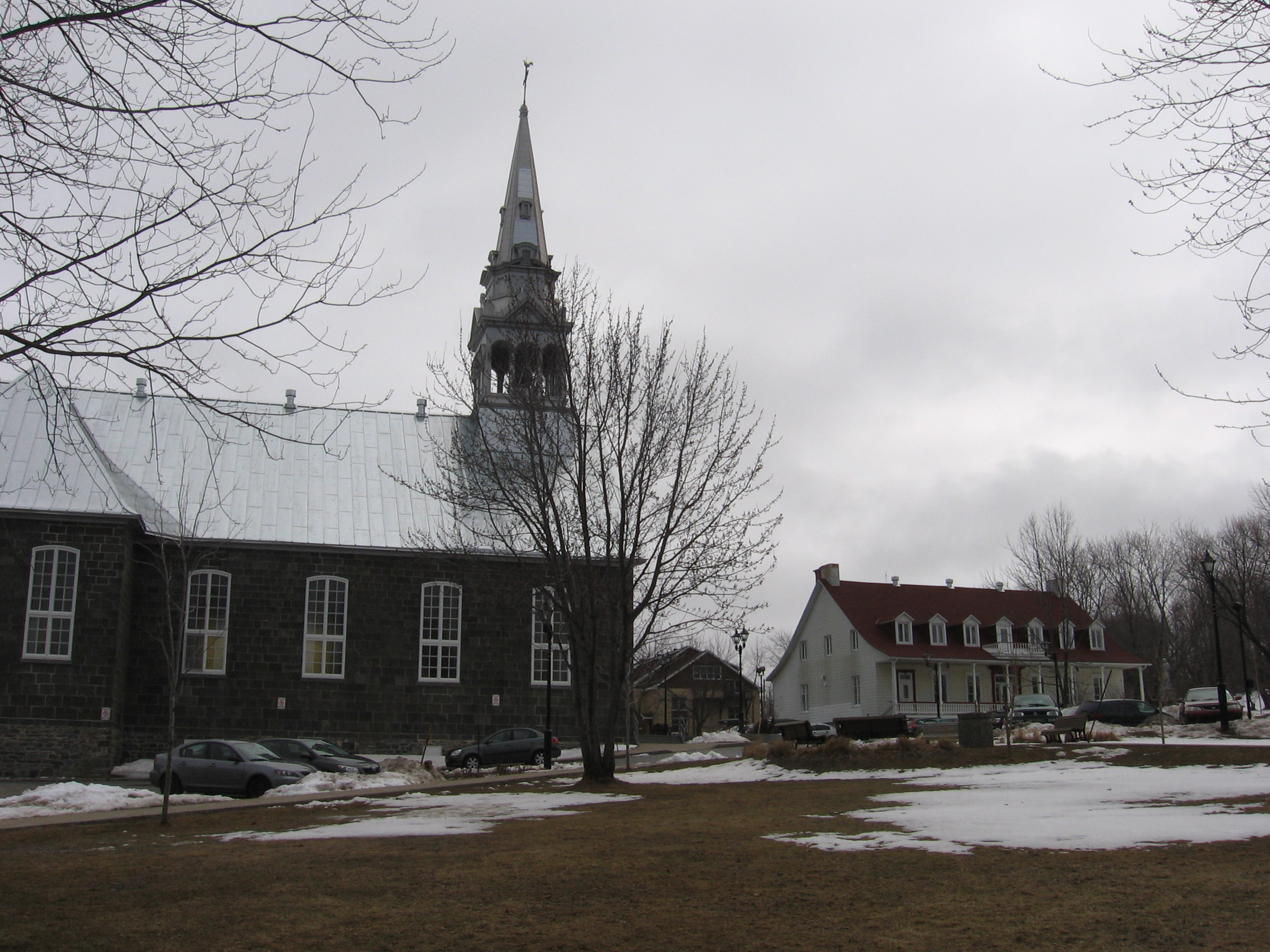
- Interactive map of Saint-Jean-Chrysostome
- Country: Canada
- Province: Quebec
- MRC: Lévis
- Established: 1828

Government
  - Type: Borough

Area
  - Total: 85.80 km^{2} (33.13 sq mi)

Population (2006)^{[1]}
  - Total: 18,061
- Time zone: UTC-5 (EST)
  - Summer (DST): UTC-4 (EDT)

Saint-Jean-Chrysostome is a sector within the Les Chutes-de-la-Chaudière-Est borough of the city of Lévis in central Quebec, Canada south of Quebec City on the south bank of the Saint Lawrence River. It was a separate town, incorporated in 1828, but in 2002 was amalgamated into Lévis.

It is a mostly suburban community, connected to Quebec City by bus (Société de transport de Lévis) via Sainte-Foy. The main high school is École secondaire l'Horizon.

According to the Canada 2006 Census:

- Population: 18,016
- % Change (2001–2006): +5.4
- Dwellings: 6,513
- Area (km^{2}): 85.80 km^{2}
- Density (persons per km^{2}): 210.0
