= Sainte-Hélène-de-Breakeyville =

Coordinates: 46°40′30″N 71°13′28″W

Saint-Hélène-de-Breakeyville
- Borough
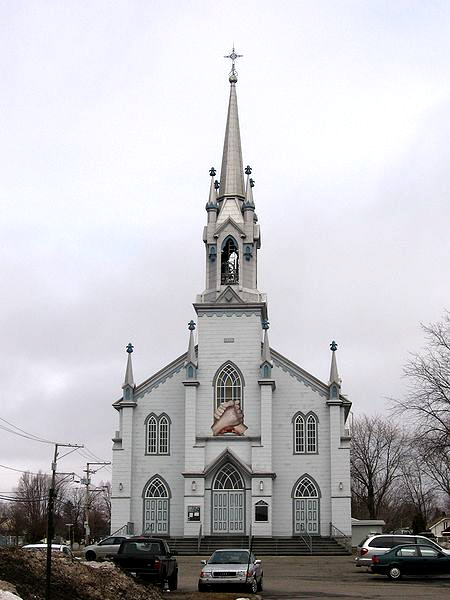
- Interactive map of Saint-Hélène-de-Breakeyville
- Country: Canada
- Province: Québec
- MRC: Lévis
- Established: 1909

Government
  - Type: Borough

Area
  - Total: 10.37 km^{2} (4.00 sq mi)

Population (2006)^{[1]}
  - Total: 4,059
- Time zone: UTC-5 (EST)
  - Summer (DST): UTC-4 (EDT)

Saint-Hélène-de-Breakeyville is a district (secteur) within the Les Chutes-de-la-Chaudière-Est borough of the city of Lévis. It is located on the Chaudière River. Prior to 2002, it was an independent municipality.

== History ==
This town was founded by the Breakey family in 1909. John Breakey, who received a concession for this region, employed many local people at his sawmill in the beginning of the 1920s. Even during the depression of the thirties, timber rafting on the river provided jobs for many families. A closed local economy gave this town an exclusive status for several decades. The mill stopped operating because of decreased timber rafting and the modernization of transport options for the forest industry in the region. The residences of the Breakey family still exist and remain as attractions for their historic architecture.
