= Saint-Rédempteur, Quebec =

Coordinates: 46°41′52″N 71°17′06″W

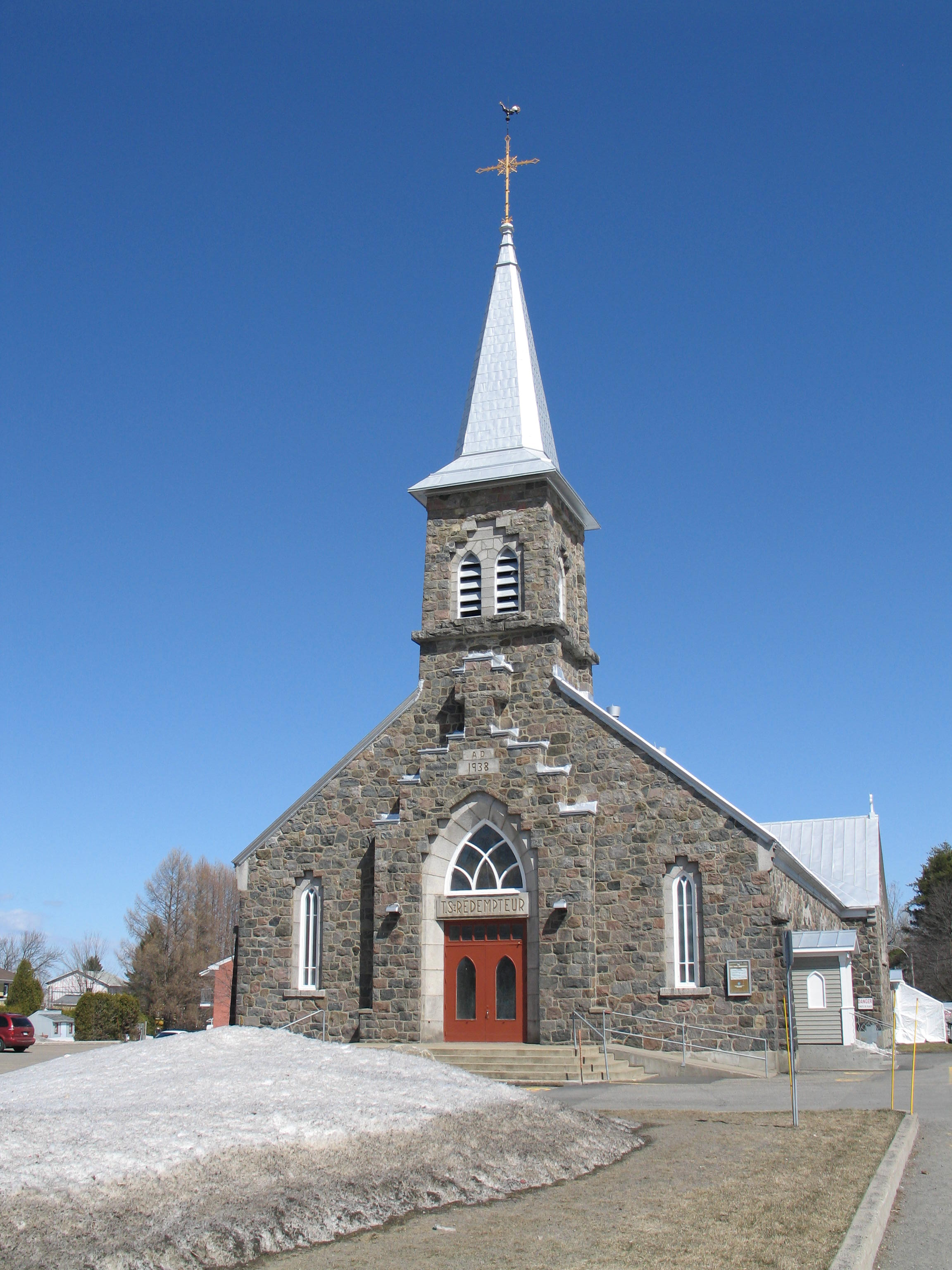
The Saint-Rédempteur church.

Saint-Rédempteur (French pronunciation: [sɛ̃ ʁedɑ̃ptœʁ]) is a district within Les Chutes-de-la-Chaudière-Ouest borough of the city of Lévis, Quebec. Prior to 2002, it was an independent municipality.

== Demographics ==
According to the Canada 2011 Census:

- Population: 7,700
- % Change (2006–2011): +10.5
- Dwellings: 2,908
- Area (km^{2}): 3.83 km^{2}
- Density (persons per km^{2}): 2,011.4
