= Maria Chapdelaine (disambiguation) =

Maria Chapdelaine is a 1913 novel set in Quebec by French writer Louis Hémon that served as the basis for films, plays, TV series, etc.

Maria Chapdelaine may also refer to:

- Maria Chapdelaine (1934 film), a French film directed by Julien Duvivier
- Maria Chapdelaine (1950 film), a French film directed by Marc Allégret
- Maria Chapdelaine (1983 film), a Canadian film directed by Gilles Carle
- Maria Chapdelaine (2021 film), a Canadian film directed by Sébastien Pilote
- Maria-Chapdelaine Regional County Municipality, a regional county municipality in Quebec
