= Maria Chapdelaine (2021 film) =

2021 Canadian film

- Film poster
- Directed by: Sébastien Pilote
- Written by: Sébastien Pilote
- Based on: Maria Chapdelaine by Louis Hémon
- Produced by: Pierre Even; Sylvain Proulx
- Starring: Sara Montpetit; Émile Schneider; Antoine Olivier Pilon; Robert Naylor
- Cinematography: Michel La Veaux
- Edited by: Richard Comeau
- Music by: Philippe Brault
- Production companies: Item 7 Multipix Management
- Distributed by: MK2 Mile End
- Release date: September 2021 (TIFF)
- Running time: 158 minutes
- Country: Canada
- Language: French

Maria Chapdelaine is a Canadian drama film, directed by Sébastien Pilote and scheduled for release on September 24, 2021. An adaptation of Louis Hémon's 1913 novel Maria Chapdelaine, the film stars Sara Montpetit as the titular Maria Chapdelaine, a young woman in rural Péribonka, Quebec, who is torn between three suitors: François Paradis (Émile Schneider), a coureur de bois; Eutrope Gagnon (Antoine Olivier Pilon), a local farmer; and Lorenzo Surprenant (Robert Naylor), a wealthy man who offers the promise of life in the United States.

The cast also includes Sébastien Ricard and Hélène Florent as Maria's parents Samuel and Laura Chapdelaine, as well as Gilbert Sicotte, Gabriel Arcand, Danny Gilmore, Martin Dubreuil, Arno Lemay, Charlotte St-Martin, Thomas Haché, Henri Picard and Xavier Rivard-Désy.

Production commenced in February 2020 in the Saguenay–Lac-Saint-Jean region. It was shut down in March by the COVID-19 pandemic in Canada before resuming in August.

The film was originally slated for theatrical release on December 18, 2020, in Canada, but the release was postponed to 2021. It premiered at the 2021 Toronto International Film Festival, in advance of its commercial release on September 24.

The Maria Chapdelaine story take place in North East of Lac Saint-Jean in towns of Péribonka and Ste-Monique-de-Honfleur (Just named Honfleur in the movie).

== Synopsis ==
Maria Chapdelaine is a young sixteen-year-old girl who lives with her family on the shores of the Peribonka River in rural Quebec in the 1910s. The Chapdelaine family works tirelessly to push the limits of the forest. Where the harshness of everyday life meets the delicacy of a warm family life, the strong and hopeful Maria finds herself faced with daunting dilemmas. Between tradition, territory, family and love, young Maria is pushed into the real world and will suddenly have to choose her future as a woman.

== Reception ==
The film was named to TIFF's annual year-end Canada's Top Ten list for 2021.

=== Awards ===
Award	Date of ceremony	Category	Recipient(s)	Result	Ref(s)
Canadian Screen Awards	April 10, 2022	Best Art Direction/Production Design	Jean Babin	Nominated	
Canadian Screen Awards	April 10, 2022	Best Costume Design	Francesca Chamberland	Nominated	
Canadian Screen Awards	April 10, 2022	Best Hair	Martin Lapointe	Won	
Canadian Screen Awards	April 10, 2022	Best Makeup	Djina Caron	Nominated	
Félix Awards	November 7, 2022	Instrumental Album of the Year	Philippe Brault	Nominated	
