= Rivière du Sault (Péribonka River) =

- Location within Quebec

Location
- Country: Canada
- Province: Quebec
- Region: Saguenay–Lac-Saint-Jean
- RCM: Maria-Chapdelaine Regional County Municipality

Physical characteristics
- Source
  - elevation: 484 metres (1,588 ft)
- 2nd source: Unidentified lake
  - coordinates: 49.515081°N 71.294526°E
- Mouth: Péribonka River
  - location: Passes-Dangereuses
  - coordinates: 49.3575°N 71.23°W
  - elevation: 183 metres (600 ft)
- Length: 25.0 kilometres (15.5 mi)

Basin features
- Progression: Péribonka River, Lac Saint-Jean, Saguenay River, Gulf of Saint Lawrence
- Tributaries
  - left: (upstream)
  - right: (upstream) Discharge of lake Albéric

The Sault River is a tributary of the Péribonka River, flowing in the unorganized territory of Passes-Dangereuses, in the Maria-Chapdelaine Regional County Municipality, in the administrative region of Saguenay–Lac-Saint-Jean, in the province of Quebec, in Canada. The Sault river flows on the east side of the zec des Passes.

The watershed of the Sault river is served by the forest road R0250 which goes up the valley of Étienniche Lake and of the rivière des Prairies to reach lac Grenier and the Brodeuse River. A few secondary roads serve the area for forestry and recreational tourism purposes.

Forestry is the main economic activity in the sector; second, recreational tourism activities.

The surface of the Sault River is usually frozen from late November to early April, however safe traffic on the ice generally occurs from mid-December to late March.

== Geography ==
The main neighboring watersheds of the Sault River are:

- North side: Portage stream, Serpent River, Manouane River, Péribonka Lake, Péribonka River;
- East side: Péribonka River, Canal Sec River, Shipshaw River, Pamouscachiou Lake;
- South side: Péribonka River, Canal Sec River;
- West side: Alex River, Margot stream, Étienniche Lake, D'Ailleboust River, Brûle-Neige River.

The Sault River takes its source at the mouth of an unidentified lake (length: 0.2 km (0.12 mi); altitude: 484 m (1,588 ft)) in the unorganized territory of Passes- Dangerous. The mouth of Lac Jacques is located at:

- 4.5 km (2.8 mi) east of Lac Étienniche;
- 7.3 km (4.5 mi) northeast of the course of the Alex River;
- 7.2 km (4.5 mi) west of the course of the Péribonka River;
- 11.9 km (7.4 mi) north-west of the mouth of the Sault river (confluence with the Péribonka River);
- 10.4 km (6.5 mi) southeast of the confluence of the Péribonka river and the Manouane River.

From its source, the Sault river flows on 25 km (16 mi) over a drop of 301 m (988 ft) entirely in forest area, according to the following segments:

- 3.0 km (1.9 mi) south to the outlet of Lake Adéodat (length: 0.8 km (0.50 mi); altitude: 446 m (1,463 ft)).
- south to the outlet of Lac Jacques (length: 1.0 km (0.62 mi); altitude: 405 m (1,329 ft)) and Rock (length: 1.9 km (1.2 mi); altitude: 394 m (1,293 ft)) to its mouth. Note: Lake Rock receives the discharge from Lake Val on the northwest side;
- 2.9 km (1.8 mi) to the east curving to the northeast, then crossing Lac Lionel on 0.5 km (0.31 mi) to the southeast (length: 1.2 km (0.75 mi) in the shape of a crescent open to the east; altitude: 337 m (1,106 ft)), up to its mouth. Note: Lake Lionel receives from the northwest the discharge of lakes Walter, André and Adéodat;
- 2.8 km (1.7 mi) towards the south, to the outlet (coming from the north) of some lakes including Lac Cochon;
- 3.3 km (2.1 mi) towards the south, to the outlet (coming from the west) of Lake Alberic;
- 3.1 km (1.9 mi) towards the south in a deep valley and forming a few serpentines, until the outlet (coming from the west) of an unidentified lake;
- 3.4 km (2.1 mi) towards the south-east, forming many small serpentines and along the eastern foot of a mountain, until its mouth.

The Sault River empties at the bottom of a very small bay on the west bank of the Péribonka River. This mouthpiece is located at:

- 4.1 km (2.5 mi) upstream from the mouth of the Canal Sec river;
- 18.6 km (11.6 mi) southeast of the mouth of Lake Pamouscachiou (which is part of the Pipmuacan Reservoir);
- 58.7 km (36.5 mi) north of the mouth of Tchitogama Lake (confluence with the Péribonka River);
- 17.0 km (10.6 mi) south of the mouth of the Manouane River;
- 90.6 km (56.3 mi) northeast of the mouth of the Péribonka River (confluence with lac Saint-Jean).

From the mouth of the Sault river, the current descends the course of the Péribonka river on 125 km (78 mi) towards the south, crosses the Saint-Jean lake on 29.3 km (18.2 mi) eastward, then on 155 km (96 mi) follows the course of the Saguenay River eastward to the height of Tadoussac where it meets the St. Lawrence River.

== Toponymy ==
The toponym of "rivière du Sault" was made official on December 5, 1968, at the Place Names Bank of the Commission de toponymie du Québec.

== See also ==
- List of rivers of Quebec
