= Zec des Passes =

Controlled area in Quebec, Canada

- Location within Quebec
- Location: Canada, Quebec, Maria-Chapdelaine Regional County Municipality
- Coordinates: 49°07′59″N 71°34′00″W
- Area: 1,491 square kilometres (576 sq mi)
- Established: 1978
- Governing body: "Société d'aménagement, de Conservation et d'Exploitation Rationnelle de la faune (SACERF) des Passes"

The ZEC des Passes is a "zone d'exploitation contrôlée" (controlled harvesting zone) (ZEC) in the unorganized territory Passes-Dangereuses, in the Maria-Chapdelaine Regional County Municipality, in the administrative region of Saguenay-Lac-Saint-Jean, in Quebec, in Canada.

ZEC is administered by the "Société d'aménagement, de Conservation et d'Exploitation Rationnelle de la faune (SACERF) des Passes" which is a non-profit organization.

== Geography ==
Zec des Passes is part of Canadian Shield. It is located west of the Péribonka River, north of Lake St. John. The territory of the ZEC is characterized by a relief formed of hills and notched cast and narrow valleys hills, the sides sometimes very steep, especially in the center of the territory. The mountain tops generally do not exceed 450 meters.

Major lakes

ZEC has more than 600 lakes, 80 have more than 20 ha. The major lakes are: Lake à Dîner (Dinner Lake), à l'Île Blanche (at the White Island), à l'Outarde (to Bustard), Alex, aux Bleuets Secs (Dry Blueberry), aux Grandes Pointes, Bernabé, Both Ways, Boudreault, Cape, Clary, Claveau, Côté, Cousineau, Craig, Croche, d'Ailleboust, Daniel, de l'Aiguillon, de l'Échevin (the Alderman), de la Charrue (the plow), de la Martre, the Ouananiche, de la Poule Folle, de la Rivière du Nord (River North), Déry, des Aigles (the Eagles), des Airelles, des Hauteurs (Heights), des îles (islands), Myriques, des Pins Gris (Gray Pines), Dicaire, du Bout, du Chardonneret (the Goldfinch), du Cinq de l'Éternité (the Five of Eternity), du Foin Bleu (Hay Blue), du Gourin, du Lancer, du Portage, Effilé, Élie, Étienniche, Falardeau, François, Georges, Grand Lac des Épinettes Noires (of the Black spruce), Henry, Jaune, Kidney, Laberge, Lacasse, Lachance, Laliberté, Lemoine, Lepage, Lessard, Long, Noir, Original (Moose), Ouitouche, Patrick, Petit lac Alex, Petit Lac Brochet, Petit Lac Clary, Premier lac Ulysse, Richard, Shadow, Versicolori and Yza.

Main watercourses

- Petite rivière Péribonka
- Alex River
- Épiphane River (upper part)
- rivière des Aigles
  - Manigouche River
  - Rivière à Patrick
    - Patrick River West
- Rivière des Épinettes Noires
- Rivière du Nord (Alex river)
- Rivière du Portage
- Brûlée River

Entrance stations

Paths to reach the entrance stations of the Zec:

- Entrance station of Saint-Ludger-de-Milot (southwest): path from the intersection of Highway 169 N and Rang St-Michel of (municipality Sainte-Monique): 1. Go north on Rang Saint Michel to rang fourth on 4.8 km; 2. Turn slight left onto 6th Rang and run 1.7 km; 3. Take the first right and continue on Route Milot over 9.4 km; 4. Continue on Rue Gaudreault over 3.8 km; 5. Turn right on Avenue Lévesque. The entrance station is on the right at 3.2 km, at 69 Avenue Lévesque, Saint-Ludger-de-Milot, QC, G0W 2B0.
- Entrance station near Long Lake (west).

== Attractions ==
In the summer of 2013, the Zec des Passes has created a marked walking trail and linear over 3 km along the river Alex. Rest areas were installed near the river for walkers. The trail also provides access to several fishing sites. The first mile of the trail has five interpretive signs highlighting the biodiversity of the area.

Easily accessible, the trail starts at the bridge of the river Alex at km 22 of the "chemin des passes" (road Passes); it ends at Lake Diner. This trail in the wilderness can observe the flora and fauna. Along the way, hikers can observe the corridor left by the micro-burst of 2011.

Backcountry camping are arranged at various locations on the ZEC.

ZEC offers services with boat rentals and lake canoes. ZEC has built boat ramps to the water at the Brûlé River and on the following lakes: Lake Étienniche, Bernabé Lake, Grand Lake Martel, Lake Dinner, East Patrick Lake, Lake Damase, Grand Alex Lake, Lake Grand Clary, Lac du Bout, Lake des Hauteurs, Lake des Bleuets Secs (Dried Blueberries lake), Lake Laliberté, Lake des Aigles (Eagle Lake), Yvonne and Lake D'Ailleboust.

The main places of interest are suggested by the ZEC: rivière des Bouleaux (River Birches), Petites Chutes Blanches (Little White Falls), Alex Grand Lake, Carrière de Granit (Granite Quarry) (at km 73), Damase Lake, Long Lake, Lake Alex, lac des Allemands (Lake of the Germans) (where a camp internment of Germans was opened in 1944 during the Second World War), lac des Hauteurs (Lake Heights), Lake Grandes Pointes (where a dam was built in 1930) and Lake Étienniche.

== Hunting and fishing ==
For recreative fishing, the five species of fish to be caught in the water bodies are: brook trout, walleye, lake trout, pike and char.

For hunting, the major animal species are on the ZEC are: moose, black bear, crested grouse, hare and American grouse of savannas.

== Toponymy ==
In the MRC Maria-Chapdelaine Regional County Municipality, more often interrelated names containing the word "passe" (French word) to refer to narrow passages between bodies of water. These names are for lakes, dikes, dams, roads, streams, islands, a ZEC (controlled harvesting zone) and falls. Some place names using the "dangerous" qualifier such as "Dangerous Passes". In this region of northern Lac Saint-Jean, several ponds of complex shapes have many passes.

The name "ZEC des Passes" was formalized on August 5, 1982, at the Bank of place names in the Commission de toponymie du Québec (Geographical Names Board of Quebec).

== See also ==
- Passes-Dangereuses, unorganized territory
- Maria-Chapdelaine Regional County Municipality
- Saguenay-Lac-Saint-Jean, an administrative region of Quebec
- Saint-Ludger-de-Milot, municipality
- Péribonka River
- Zone d'exploitation contrôlée (Controlled harvesting zone) (ZEC)
