= Pointe-Taillon National Park =

National park of Quebec, Canada

- IUCN category II (national park)
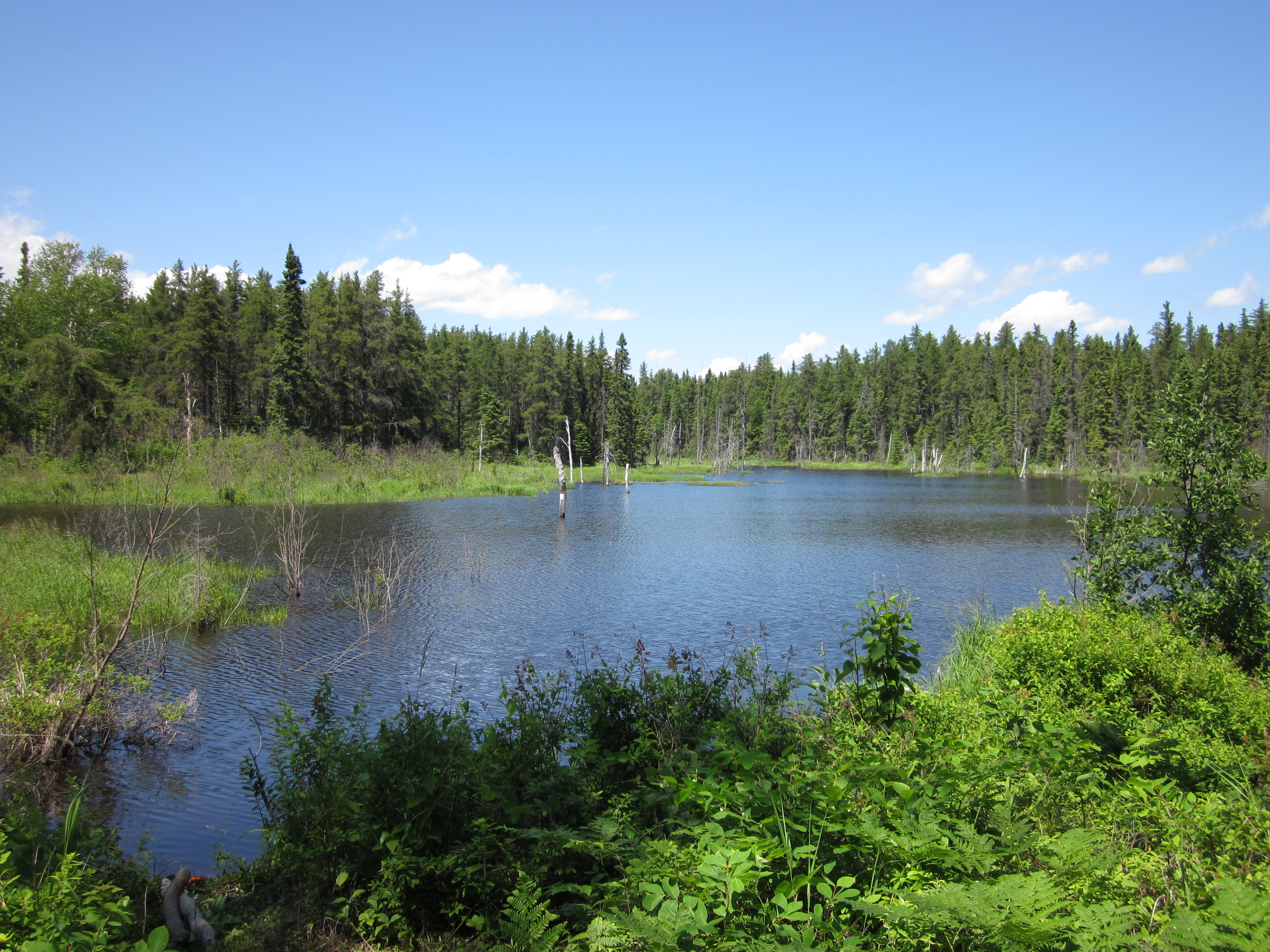
- Marsh in Pointe-Taillon National Park

- Location within Quebec
- Interactive map of Pointe-Taillon National Park
- Location: Sainte-Monique, Lac-Saint-Jean-Est Regional County Municipality, Québec, Canada
- Nearest city: Alma
- Coordinates: 48°42′00″N 71°58′00″W
- Area: 97.5 km^{2} (37.6 sq mi)
- Established: 1985
- Visitors: 49,000 (in 2005)
- Governing body: SEPAQ

Pointe-Taillon National Park (French: Parc national de la Pointe-Taillon, pronounced [paʁk nɑsjɔnal də la pwɛ̃t tajɔ̃]) is a provincial park in Quebec, Canada. It is located on the north shore of Lac Saint-Jean, northwest of Saguenay (city), northwest of Alma, near the village of Saint-Henri-de-Taillon, on the banks of Lac Saint-Jean. The park covers an area of 97.5 km (60.58 mi) has as a 45 km (28 mi) cycling network.

The park's mission is to protect a representative sample of the Saguenay–Lac-Saint-Jean lowlands. In addition to having one of the most famous beaches on the lake, the park protects the marshes located between the Péribonka River and the lake. As there are no roads in the park, the best way to explore it is by bicycle or hiking. The park has several peat bogs typical of the boreal forest as well as an abundant population of moose and beavers.

The park is managed by the Quebec government through the Société des établissements de plein air du Québec (SÉPAQ).

== Geography ==
The park is in itself a sandy point with almost flat relief. The point was formed by a post-glacial delta formed 7,000 at 5,000 years ago from the deposits of the Péribonka River. The center of the point is a huge bog and the edges include many swamps and wetlands.

== History ==
Nicknamed when it started "Pointe Savane", Pointe Taillon bears his name in honor of Louis-Olivier Taillon, who was Premier of Quebec 4 days in 1886 and a second time between 1892 and 1896. Between 1890 and 1930, the point was opened to agriculture. The municipality of Sainte-Jeanne-d'Arc was incorporated in 1916. At the peak, in 1925, the point had 307 inhabitants. The Île Bouliane, owned by Frenchman Paul-Augustin Normand, was a prosperous farm with more than 125 employees who won numerous agricultural awards.

In 1926, the closing of the gates of the central of Isle-Maligne caused the flooding of the best agricultural land on the peninsula and the purchase of the land by Alcan. A reforestation program was undertaken in 1948 and 1956. In 1977, the government acquired the land, and the park was officially created on 6 November 1985. On 22, the Minister of Sustainable Development, Environment and Parks, announced that public consultations would be held to include the islands of Lac Saint-Jean west of Alma and Saint-Gédéon. In January 2017, the park area increased from 92.2 km (57.3 mi) to 97.5 km (60.58 mi) by adding land to the park in Saint-Henri-de-Taillon, Saint-Gédéon and Alma including thirty islands and islets on Lac Saint-Jean.

== Activities ==
Pointe-Taillon Park offers more than 15 km (9.3 mi) of beaches on Lac Saint-Jean. It also offers 45 km (28 mi) of cycle paths, of which 16 km (9.9 mi) are part of the Route verte. Several short hiking trails start from this one. Four rustic campsites, three accessible by bicycle and only one by boat, allow you to stay in a park.
