= Rivière de la Grande Loutre =

Location
- Country: Canada
- Province: Quebec
- Region: Saguenay-Lac-Saint-Jean
- Regional County Municipality: Maria-Chapdelaine Regional County Municipality

Physical characteristics
- Source: Dubray Lake
  - location: Passes-Dangereuses
  - coordinates: 51°08′22″N 71°53′17″W
  - elevation: 553 m (1,814 ft)
- Mouth: Péribonka River
  - location: Passes-Dangereuses
  - coordinates: 51°07′59″N 71°25′46″W
  - elevation: 447 m (1,467 ft)
- Length: 72 km (45 mi)

Basin features
- Progression: Péribonka River, Lac Saint-Jean, Saguenay River, Saint Lawrence River
- Tributaries
  - left: (upstream)
  - right: (upstream)

The Rivière de la Grande Loutre is a tributary of the Péribonka River, flowing in the unorganized territory of Passes-Dangereuses, in the Maria-Chapdelaine Regional County Municipality, in the administrative region of Saguenay–Lac-Saint-Jean, in the province of Quebec, in Canada.

The upper part of the watershed of the Grande Loutre river is served by the forest road R0206 (north–south direction) which passes between Dubray Lake and lac de Bransac. From the south, this road goes up the Mistassibi River. A few secondary roads serve the area for forestry and recreational tourism purposes.

Forestry is the main economic activity in the sector; second, recreational tourism activities.

The surface of the Grande Loutre River is usually frozen from late November to early April, however safe traffic on the ice is generally from early December to early April.

== Geography ==
The main neighboring watersheds of the Grande Loutre river are:

- North side: Péribonka River, Deux Milles lake, Natipi lake, Indicator Lake, Pluto Lake;
- East side: Péribonka River, Savane River, Piacouadie Lake;
- South side: Péribonka River, Machisque Lake, Onistagane Lake, lake Gazeau;
- West side: Témiscamie Lake, Petit lac Témiscamie, Témiscamie River, Coursay Lake, lake Albanel, Mistassini Lake.

The Grande Loutre river takes its source at the mouth of Dubray Lake (length: 5.3 km (3.3 mi); altitude: 553 m (1,814 ft)) in the unorganized territory of Passes-Dangereuses, or to:

- 54.7 km (34.0 mi) northwest of Onistagane Lake which is crossed by the Péribonka River;
- 28.4 km (17.6 mi) to the southwest of a curve in the course of the Péribonka River;
- 32.3 km (20.1 mi) southwest of the mouth of the Grande Loutre river (confluence with the Péribonka river);
- 144.7 km (89.9 mi) northwest of the dam at the mouth of lake Péribonka;
- 153.6 km (95.4 mi) north-west of the center of the village of Chute-des-Passes.

From its source (Lake Dubray), the Grande Loutre river flows over 72 km (45 mi) on a drop of 106 m (348 ft) entirely in the forest zone, according to the following segments:

Upper course of the Grande Loutre river (segment of 16.6 m (54 ft))

- 1.6 m (5 ft 3 in) easterly, to the southwest shore of lac de Bransac;
- 5.8 m (19 ft) towards the North, crossing lac de Bransac (length: 4.2 km (2.6 mi); altitude: 531 m (1,742 ft)), until at its mouth. Note: This lake receives on the northwest side the discharge of a set of lakes including Lake Blanot;
- 9.2 m (30 ft) towards the South-East crossing Palairet Lake (length: 8.9 km (5.5 mi); altitude: 511 m (1,677 ft)) in bypassing the peninsulas which segment this lake into five parts, up to its mouth;

Intermediate course of the Grande Loutre river (segment of 32.0 m (105.0 ft))

- 11.3 m (37 ft) towards the east by crossing two series of rapids, towards the north in a marsh area and collecting the discharge (coming from the west) of some lakes, then forming a hook of 180 degrees east at the end of the segment, to the east shore of an unidentified lake;
- 6.2 m (20 ft) towards the South-East, zigzagging around the peninsulas by crossing an unidentified lake (altitude: 491 m (1,611 ft)) on its full length until its mouth. Note: This lake receives the discharge (coming from the South) of some lakes;
- 5.9 m (19 ft) first east across two unidentified lakes, then south-east across 3.8 km (2.4 mi) an unidentified lake (length: 5.2 km (3.2 mi); altitude: 481 m (1,578 ft)) to its mouth. Note: This lake receives the discharge (coming from the South) of some lakes;
- 3.4 m (11 ft) towards the South, then the North crossing an unidentified lake for its full length (length: 2.7 km (1.7 mi); altitude: 475 m (1,558 ft)) to its mouth. Note: This lake receives the discharge (coming from the South) of some lakes;

Lower course of the Grande Loutre river (segment of 9.4 m (31 ft))

- 3.7 m (12 ft) towards the North-East, crossing on 0.3 km (0.19 mi) an unidentified lake (length: 1.2 km (0.75 mi); altitude: 455 m (1,493 ft)) to its mouth. Note: This lake receives the discharge (coming from South) from few lakes;
- 1.6 m (5 ft 3 in) towards the North, up to a curve in the river, corresponding to a stream (coming from the Northwest);
- 4.1 km (2.5 mi) towards the east, forming a large M and making a detour to the south at the end of the segment, until its mouth.

The Grande Loutre river flows onto the west bank of the Péribonka river, at:

- 2.0 km (1.2 mi) downstream from the mouth of the Savane River;
- 39.9 km (24.8 mi) north-west of Onistagane Lake;
- 50.9 km (31.6 mi) north-west of Témiscamie Lake;
- 34.8 km (21.6 mi) northwest of a bay on the northwest shore of Manouane Lake;
- 82.4 km (51.2 mi) south-west of Piacouadie Lake;
- 37.6 km (23.4 mi) south of a bay in Onistagane Lake;
- to the southwest of a bay in Lake Manouane;
- 136.8 km (85.0 mi) northwest of the mouth of Lake Péribonka;
- 181.3 km (112.7 mi) northwest of the mouth of the Manouane River;
- 268 km (167 mi) northwest of the mouth of the Péribonka River (confluence with lac Saint-Jean).

From the mouth of the Grande Loutre river, the current descends the course of the Péribonka river on 345.5 km (214.7 mi) towards the south, crosses Lake Saint-Jean on 29.3 km (18.2 mi) eastward, then on 155 km (96 mi) follows the course of the Saguenay River eastward to the height of Tadoussac where it meets the Saint Lawrence River.

== Toponymy ==
The toponym of "Rivière de la Grande Loutre" was made official on March 3, 1971, at the Place Names Bank of the Commission de toponymie du Québec.

== See also ==
- List of rivers of Quebec
