= Saint-Gédéon, Quebec =

Saint-Gédéon
- Municipality
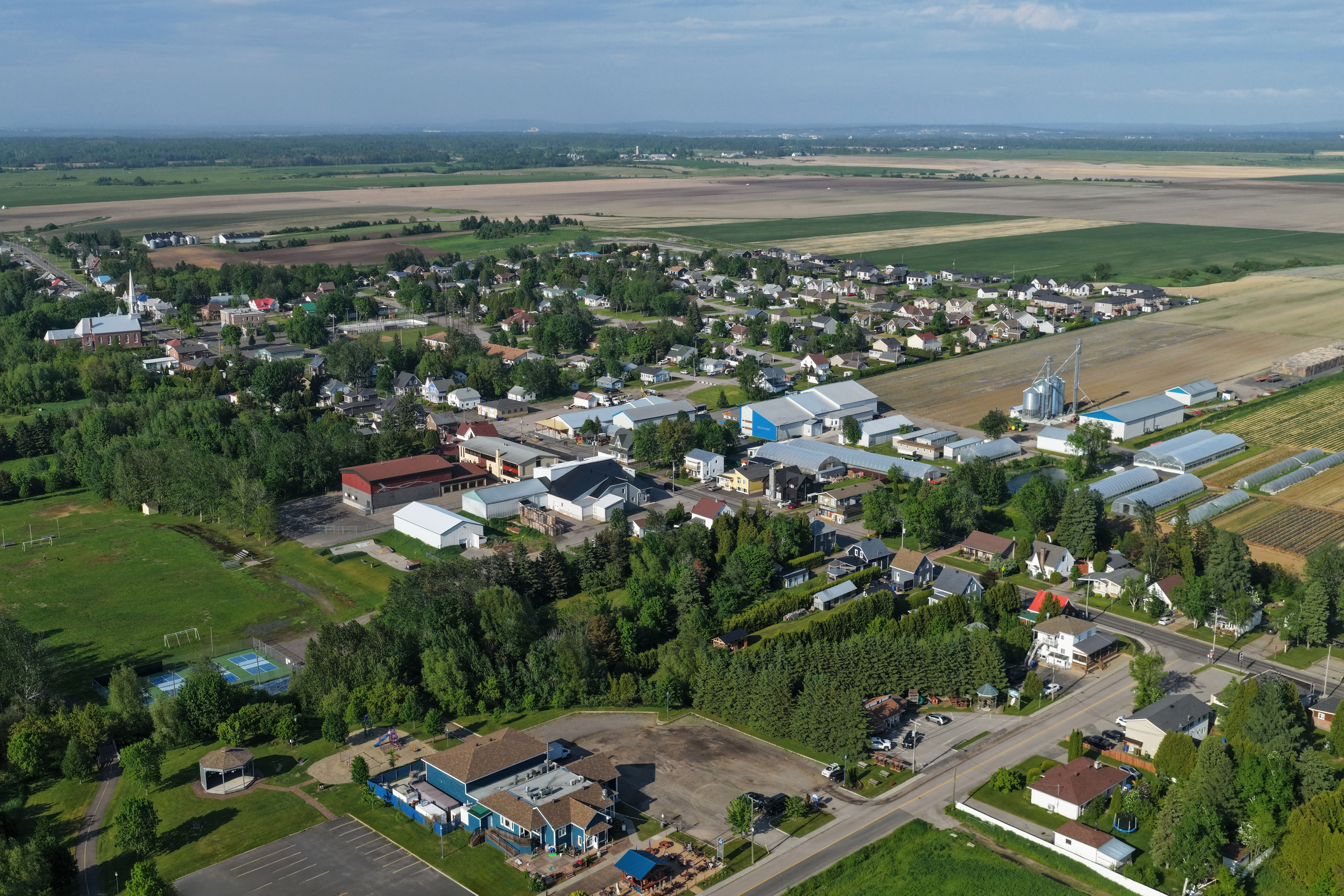
- Aerial view (2026)

- Coat of arms

- Location in Saguenay–Lac-Saint-Jean Quebec
- Coordinates: 48°30′N 71°46′W
- Country: Canada
- Province: Quebec
- Region: Saguenay–Lac-Saint-Jean
- RCM: Lac-Saint-Jean-Est
- Settled: 1863
- Constituted: December 6, 1975

Government
  - Mayor: Jacob Coulombe
  - Federal riding: Lac-Saint-Jean
  - Prov. riding: Lac-Saint-Jean

Area
  - Total: 82.80 km^{2} (31.97 sq mi)
  - Land: 63.38 km^{2} (24.47 sq mi)

Population (2021)
  - Total: 2,177
  - Density: 34.3/km^{2} (89/sq mi)
  - Pop 2016-2021: ▲4.4%
  - Dwellings: 1,219
- Time zone: UTC−5 (EST)
  - Summer (DST): UTC−4 (EDT)
- Postal code(s): G0W 2P0
- Area codes: 418 and 581
- Highways: R-170
- Website: www.st-gedeon.qc.ca

Saint-Gédéon (French pronunciation: [sɛ̃ ʒedeɔ̃]) is a municipality in Quebec, Canada, in the regional county municipality of Lac-Saint-Jean-Est and the administrative region of Saguenay–Lac-Saint-Jean. It is on the eastern shore of Lac Saint-Jean at the mouth of the Belle River.

== History ==
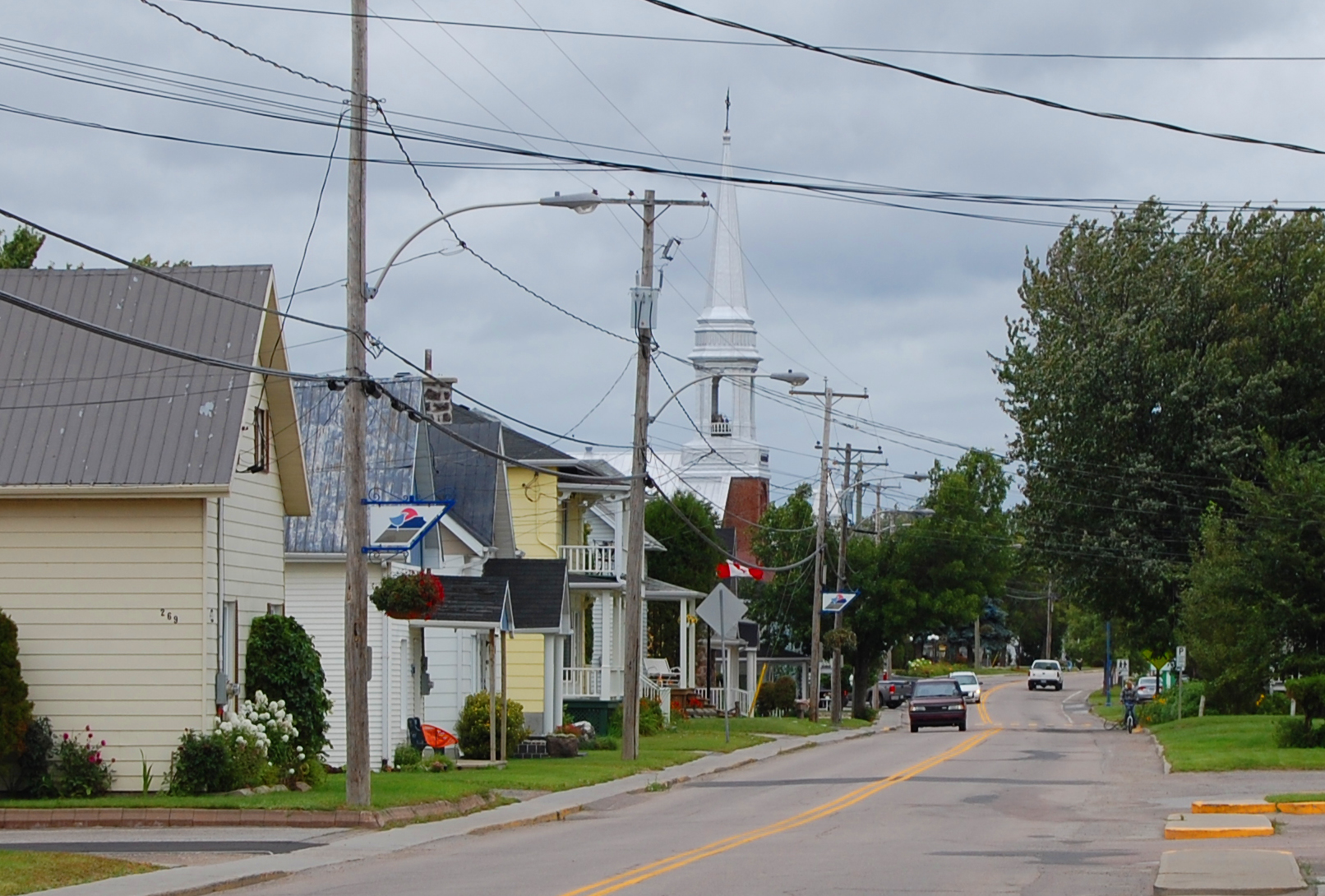
Rue de Quen in 2009

=== Pre-colonial era and explorations ===
Before the arrival of the first explorers and colonisation, La Belle Rivière, which flows south of Saint-Gédéon, was the main route used by the Kakouchaks (Innu) tribe to reach the Saguenay River. The first European to reach Lac Saint-Jean, Jean de Quen, travelled along this river in 1646. It is also believed that it was here, on the banks of this river, that the Montagnais defeated some thirty Iroquois invaders in 1664.

In 1732, explorer Joseph-Laurent Normandin used this route to travel to Lac Saint-Jean. In 1851, the Price Company began building a sawmill on Grandmont Creek.

The history of Saint-Gédéon began in 1851 with the opening of construction sites by the William Price Company, although the old fur trade route had passed through there in the past.

=== Colonisation and establishment of the municipality ===
The current territory of Saint-Gédéon was colonised during the first phase of settlement of Lac Saint-Jean, which lasted from 1857 with the foundation of the municipality of Lac-Saint-Jean until the Great Fire of Saguenay–Lac-Saint-Jean in 1870. In 1859, Lac-Saint-Jean was split in two distinct municipality: Roberval, covering the west part and Hébertville, covering the east part. It was around 1862 that the first settlers began to prepare their settlement on the north bank of the Belle Rivière in Hébertville. This group of farmers, consisting of Célestin Laplante, Vital Fortin and Pierre Drouyn, moved in with their families in 1864. From 1862 to 1868, the territory was served by the church of Hébertville. In 1867 and 1868, new settlements were formed by settlers Joseph Morel, Adolphe Lindsay and Pierre Lindsay in the island area and by Étienne Coulombe, Georges Murray, Hippolyte Lessard and Joseph Lessard in what is now the village area.

From 1868 until 1880, the church of Saint-Jérome took charge serving the small, fledgling community, which already had 40 families by 1869. In May 1870, the Great Fire of Saguenay–Lac-Saint-Jean spared most of the sector, except for the lands along the Belle Rivière, which were devastated.

The first school in the sector, a voluntary institution with 30 to 40 pupils, opened its doors in February 1872. In 1875, the Saint-Gédéon de Grandmont school board was established. The Cercle agricole de Saint-Gédéon, a gathering of farmers who exchanged ideas on farming and livestock breeding methods, was founded by Joseph Girard in 1883. Several other agricultural circles were formed in rural areas around Lac Saint-Jean and Saguenay. The Saint-Gédéon circle quickly established itself as the most dynamic in the region and served as a model for other circles. Joseph Girard was also responsible for establishing the township's first cheese factory. On 23 February 1884, the parish was canonically established and named Saint-Gédéon.

Saint-Gédéon officially became its own independent municipality on 12 December 1887 when it split from Hébertville. Mostly destroyed by fire, several places of worship succeeded one another in the parish. The first chapel, built in 1872, burned down in December 1882 and was replaced by a more modest chapel and a public hall, which burned down in 1897. The first church, built of wood and featuring the first carillon in Lac Saint-Jean, was blessed on 1 March 1888 but was also destroyed by a fire caused by lightning on 23 June 1897. It was not until 20 July 1898 that the current church was blessed.

The Canadian National Railway train arrived in Saint-Gédéon in 1892. In 1895, the residents of Saint-Gédéon asked Monsignor Michel-Thomas Labrecque, the bishop of Chicoutimi at the time, for permission to build a statue in honour of Saint Gedeon. The religious authorities refused because, after checking the catalogue of saints, they discovered that Saint Gédéon was a miracle worker. Following this discovery, Saint Anthony of Padua was designated patron saint of the parish by the bishop. At the beginning of the 20th century, Saint-Gédéon was the fourth largest dairy producer in Lac Saint-Jean after Saint-Jérôme, Hébertville and Saint-Joseph-d'Alma. On 14 September 1903, the Sisters of Bon-Conseil opened two classrooms in the public hall while awaiting the construction of the convent school.

The first water supply network in Saint-Gédéon was blessed on 5 October 1912. It was 19 kilometres long and carried water to the six main roads in the parish.

=== Division of Village and parish ===
In 1916, the creation of the village municipality of Saint-Gédéon to the south-east of the parish municipality of Saint-Gédéon led to the division of the territory into two separate municipalities. In terms of roads, macadam made its appearance in the village that same year, covering 3 kilometres of roads. Wooden sidewalks were also built in 1919. Saint-Gédéon acquired a fire station in 1921, with equipment pulled by horses. The village was lit by electricity from 1922 to 1927, but as the lease with the electricity supplier was not renewed, it was not until 1947 that street lighting was actually installed in the village. In 1923, Saint-Gédéon and Saint-Jérome financed the construction of a concrete bridge over the Belle Rivière.

The wooden pavements were replaced by cement pavements in 1932. A branch of the Caisse Desjadins opened in 1937. Road asphalting began in 1944. The new fire station opened in 1949; more modern than the old one, it had a fire engine.

=== Recent history ===
In 1975, the current municipality of Saint-Gédéon was formed following the merger the village municipality of Saint-Gédéon and parish municipality of Saint-Gédéon. On 19 June 2001, a force 2 (F2) tornado struck the municipality, causing damage to the municipal garage and some fifteen residences in the heart of the village and on Rang 5. The quality of the emergency measures and their effective implementation by the municipality's Public Safety Committee during this disaster was honoured by the Quebec Ministry of Public Security. On 10 May 2002, the municipality received the Quebec Civil Protection Merit Award for Intervention and Recovery at the National Assembly of Quebec.

== Demographics ==
Population trend:

- Population in 2021: 2,177 (2016 to 2021 population change: 4.4%)
- Population in 2016: 2,085
- Population in 2011: 2,001
- Population in 2006: 1,931
- Population in 2001: 1,923
- Population in 1996: 1,877
- Population in 1991: 1,803
- Population in 1986: 1,785
- Population in 1981: 1,690
- Population in 1976: 1,646

Private dwellings occupied by usual residents: 968 (total dwellings: 1,219)

Mother tongue:

- English as first language: 0.7%
- French as first language: 98.9%
- English and French as first language: 0.2%
- Other as first language: 0.5%

=== Religion ===
According to the 2021 Census of Population conducted by Statistics Canada, Roman Catholicism had 1,625 adherents in the municipality in 2021. There were 395 atheists (18%). Residents of Saint-Gédéon belonging to other religions represented less than 1% of the population.

There is a Roman Catholic cemetery, cimetière Saint-Antoine-de-Padoue. Saint-Gédéon has a permanent deacon, Daniel Audy, M.A., who was ordained by Mgr Couture, on June 7, 1991 of the feast day of the Sacred Heart.

== Arts and culture ==
Louis Hémon wrote the first draft of Maria Chapdelaine while staying in Saint-Gédéon in 1912.

== Infrastructure ==
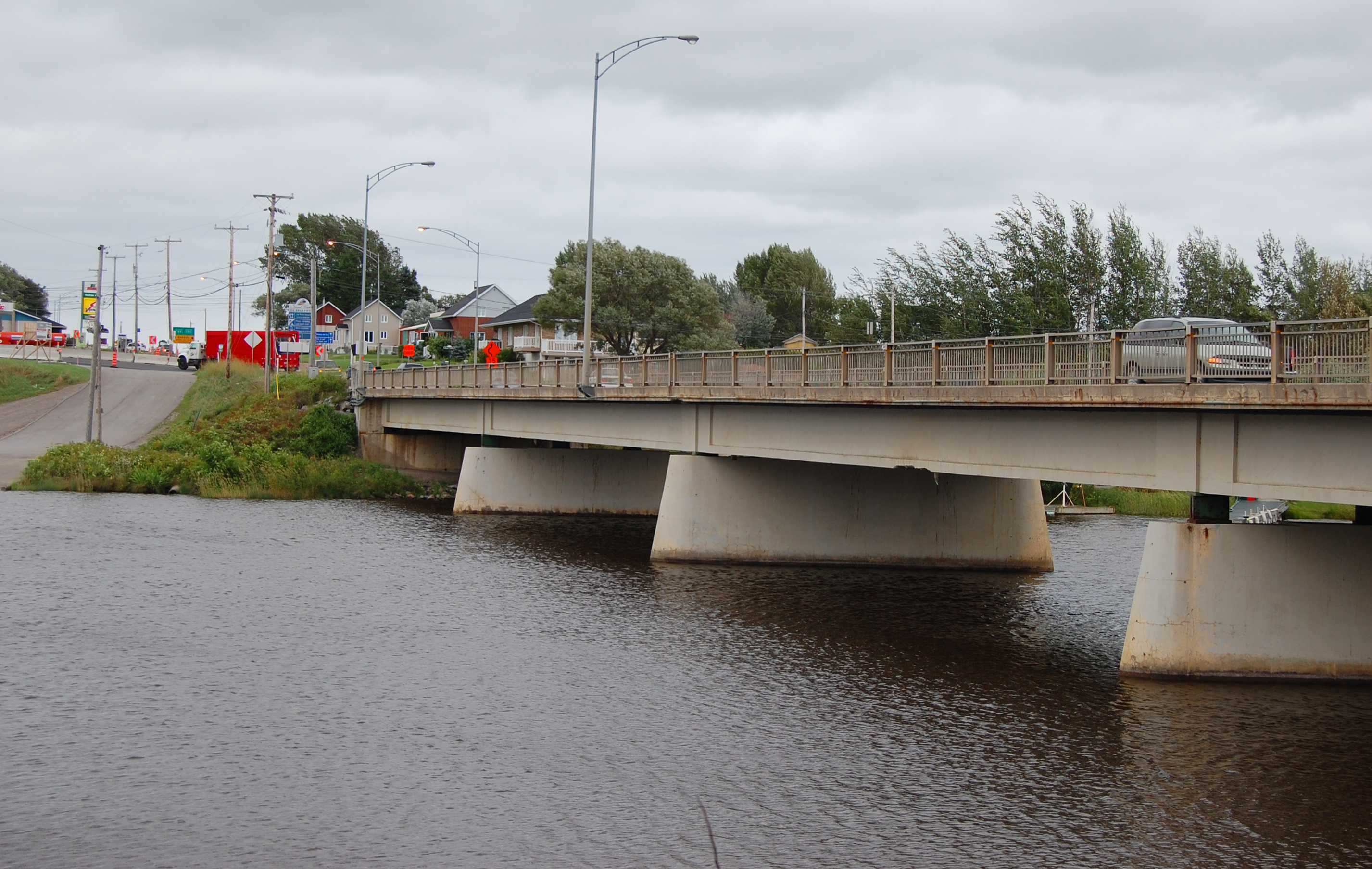
Charles-Eugène-Couture Bridge (Route 170) over the Belle Rivière

The Blueberry Cycling Route (La véloroute des Bleuets in French), part of the Route Verte, goes through Saint-Gédéon.

== Images ==
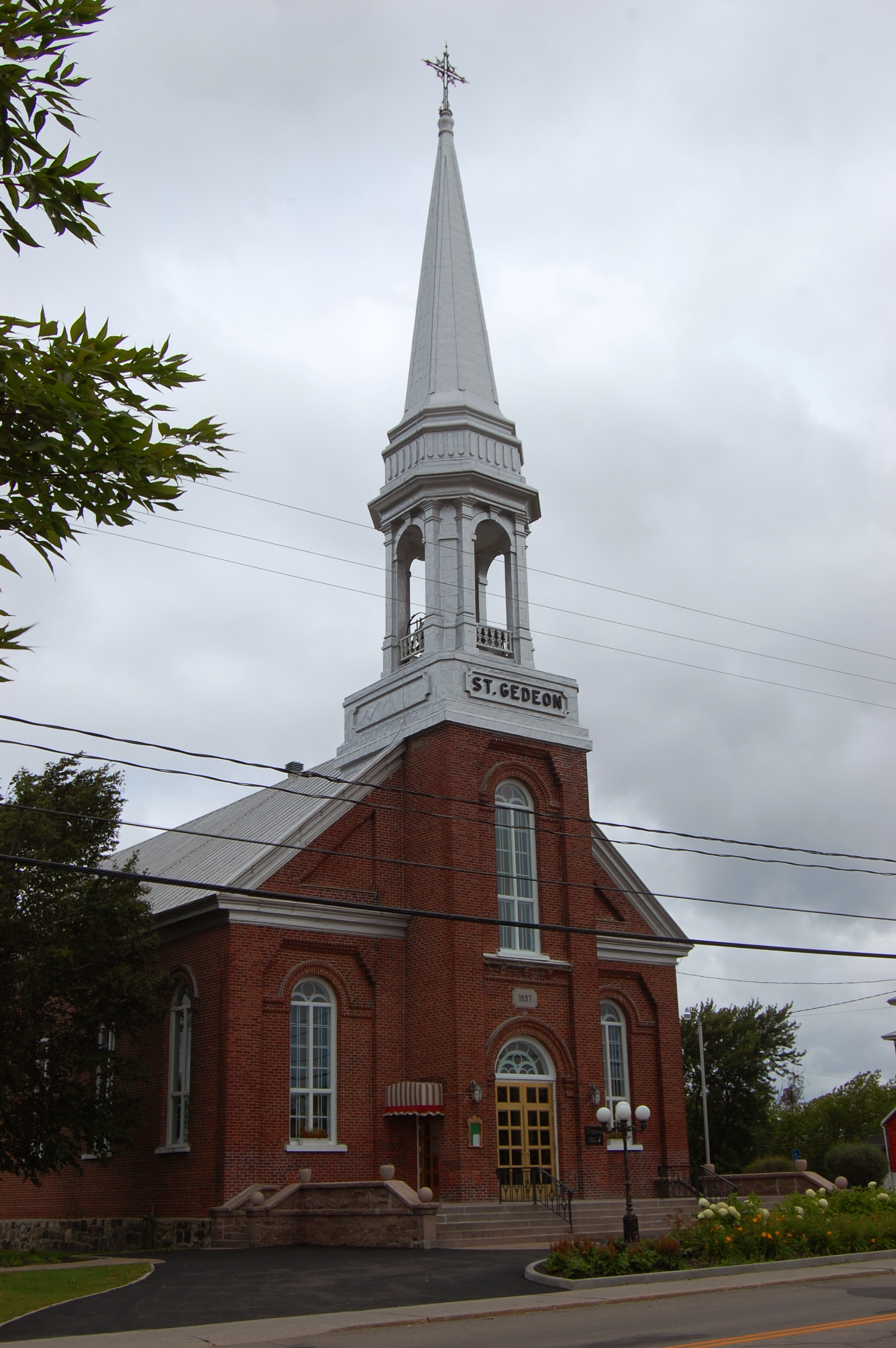
Saint-Antoine-de-Padoue Church

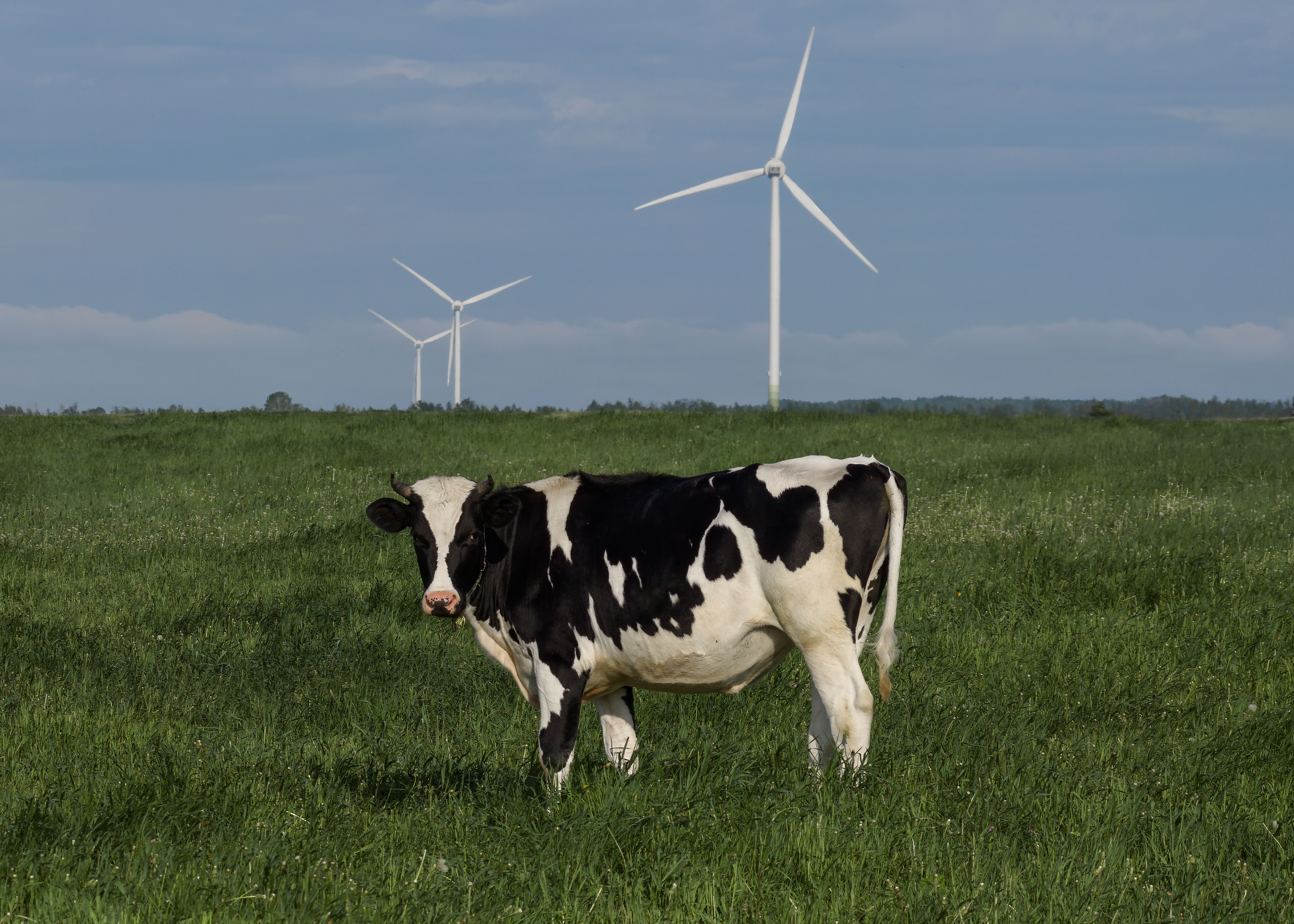
Holstein cow in a pasture

== See also ==
- List of municipalities in Quebec

== Bibliography ==
=== French ===
- Christine Côté, Louanges d'un siècle, St-Gédéon: Paroisse Saint-Antoine, 1984, 94 pages
- Johanne Laberge et collaborateurs, Itinéraire toponymique du Saguenay Lac St-Jean , Commission de toponymie du Québec, 1983, 101 pages
- René Raymond, Pédologie de la région du Lac-Saint-Jean, Québec : Ministère de l'agriculture et de la colonisation, Division des sols, 1965, 157 pages
- Mère Sainte-Hélène, N.D.B.C., Saint-Gédéon de Grandmont célèbre son centenaire, 1864-1964, Saint-Gédéon, 1964, 184 pages
- Victor Tremblay, « Saint-Gédéon », Saguenayensia Volume 6, numéro 3, mai-juin 1964, page 64
- Girard, Camil; Perron, Normand (1979). Histoire du Saguenay-Lac-Saint-Jean (in French). Institut québécois de recherche sur la culture. ISBN 2-89224-126-X..
- Bouchard, Russel (1988). Le Pays du Lac-Saint-Jean : esquisse historique de la colonisation (in French). ISBN 2-9800373-8-9.
