= Péribonka East River =

- Location within Quebec

Location
- Country: Canada
- Province: Quebec
- Region: Saguenay-Lac-Saint-Jean
- Regional County Municipality: Le Fjord-du-Saguenay Regional County Municipality
- Municipality: Eeyou Istchee Baie-James

Physical characteristics
- Source: Lac de l’Agoseris
  - location: Eeyou Istchee Baie-James (municipalité)
  - coordinates: 52.28834°N 70.53482°W
  - elevation: 787 m (2,582 ft)
- Mouth: Péribonka River
  - location: Mont-Valin
  - coordinates: 51.85305°N 71.24555°E
  - elevation: 570 m (1,870 ft)
- Length: 54.8 km (34.1 mi)
- Discharge
  - location: Saguenay (city)

Basin features
- Tributaries
  - left: (from the mouth)
  - right: (from the mouth)

The Péribonka East River is a tributary of the Péribonka River, flowing in the province of Quebec, in Canada. This watercourse crosses the administrative regions of:

- Nord-du-Québec: municipality of Eeyou Istchee Baie-James;
- Saguenay–Lac-Saint-Jean: in the northern part of the Le Fjord-du-Saguenay Regional County Municipality, in the unorganized territory of Mont-Valin.

Forestry is the main economic activity in the sector; recreational tourism activities are incidental considering the geographic remoteness and lack of access roads.

The surface of the Péribonka East River is usually frozen from the end of November to the beginning of April, however the safe circulation on the ice is generally done from mid-December to the end of March.

== Geography ==
The main hydrographic slopes neighboring the Péribonka Est river are:

- North side: Péribonka River, Pluto Lake, Pollet Lake, Fromont Lake;
- East side: Carignan River, Deux Décharges Lake, Cran Cassé Lake, Cran Cassé River, Savane River;
- South side: Épervanche River, Courtois Lake, Courtois River, Savane River, Péribonka River;
- West side: Péribonka River, Indicator Lake, Témiscamie River, Témiscamie East River.

The Péribonka Est river takes its source at the mouth of the Agoseris lake (length: 4.3 km (2.7 mi); altitude: 787 m (2,582 ft)) in the municipality of Eeyou Istchee Baie-James. The mouth of this lake is located at:

- 4.4 km (2.7 mi) Southwest of the head lake of the Otish River;
- 7.4 km (4.6 mi) Southwest of a mountain whose summit reaches 1,120 m (3,670 ft);
- 18.9 km (11.7 mi) North-East of the source of the Péribonka River;
- 15.4 km (9.6 mi) North-East of the source of the Rivière aux Outardes;
- 47.0 km (29.2 mi) Southeast of Naococane Lake;
- 45.9 km (28.5 mi) North-West of Plétipi Lake;
- 56.4 km (35.0 mi) South-West of the course of the Mouchalagane River;
- 68.9 km (42.8 mi) North-West of the mouth of the Péribonka East River (confluence with the Péribonka River).

From its source, the Péribonka East River flows over 54.8 km (34.1 mi) over an elevation of 217 m (712 ft) entirely in the forest zone, according to the following segments:

- 20.1 km (12.5 mi) south-east to the north-east shore of Kerverso Lake, corresponding to the confluence of a discharge (coming from the east) of lakes;
- 13.2 km (8.2 mi) towards the South-East until the confluence of the Carignan River (coming from the North-East);
- 3.3 km (2.1 mi) to the south by collecting a stream (coming from the North-West), up to the outlet (coming from the North-West) of two unidentified lakes;
- 10.6 km (6.6 mi) towards the South-East by collecting four streams (coming from the North-East), up to the outlet (coming from the South-East) from two unidentified lakes;
- 7.6 km (4.7 mi) south-east, to its mouth.

The Péribonka Est river flows on the East bank of the Péribonka river. This mouthpiece is located at:

- 10.1 km (6.3 mi) North of the mouth of the Épervanche River;
- 15.7 km (9.8 mi) North-West of Courtois Lake;
- 38.7 km (24.0 mi) Northeast of Indicator Lake which is crossed by Témiscamie River;
- 116.6 km (72.5 mi) North-West of Manouane Lake;
- 79.2 km (49.2 mi) North of the mouth of the Savane River;
- East of a bay on Natipi Lake;
- 126.9 km (78.9 mi) north-west of the mouth of Onistagane Lake which is crossed by the Péribonka river;
- 216 km (134 mi) North-West of the mouth of Péribonka Lake;
- 349 km (217 mi) North of the mouth of the Péribonka river (confluence with lac Saint-Jean).

From the mouth of the Péribonka East river, the current descends the course of the Péribonka river on 602.7 km (374.5 mi) to the South, crosses Lac Saint-Jean on 29.3 km (18.2 mi) towards the East, then follows on 155 km (96 mi) the course of the Saguenay River towards the East up to the height of Tadoussac where it merges with the Saint Lawrence River.

== Toponymy ==
The term "Péribonka" derives from the Montagnais term "pelipaukau", meaning "river digging in the sand, where the sand moves".

The toponym of “Rivière Péribonka Est” was formalized on December 18, 1986, at the Place Names Bank of the Commission de toponymie du Québec.

== See also ==
- List of rivers of Quebec
