= Saint-Gédéon =

Saint-Gédéon may refer to:

- Saint-Gédéon, Quebec, a municipality in Lac-Saint-Jean-Est Regional County Municipality, Saguenay–Lac-Saint-Jean, Quebec, Canada
- Saint-Gédéon-de-Beauce, Quebec, a municipality in Beauce-Sartigan Regional County Municipality, Chaudière-Appalaches, Quebec, Canada
