= Maria Chapdelaine (1934 film) =

- Directed by: Julien Duvivier
- Written by: Louis Hémon (novel); Julien Duvivier; Gabriel Boissy
- Produced by: Léon Beytout; Alex Nalpas; René Pignières
- Starring: Madeleine Renaud; Jean Gabin; Jean-Pierre Aumont
- Cinematography: Marc Fossard; Jules Kruger
- Edited by: Claude Ibéria
- Music by: Jean Wiener
- Production company: Société Nouvelle de Cinématographie
- Distributed by: Pathé Consortium Cinéma
- Release date: 4 December 1934
- Running time: 77 minutes
- Country: France
- Language: French

Maria Chapdelaine is a 1934 French drama film directed by Julien Duvivier and starring Madeleine Renaud, Jean Gabin and Jean-Pierre Aumont. It is an adaptation of the 1913 novel of the same title by Louis Hémon set in rural Quebec about a young woman who becomes involved with a farmer, trapper and an immigrant drifter from Paris. The story was adapted again for a 1950 film directed by Marc Allégret.

== Cast ==
- Madeleine Renaud as Maria Chapdelaine
- Jean Gabin as François Paradis
- Jean-Pierre Aumont as Lorenzo Surprenant
- Suzanne Desprès as Laura Chapdelaine
- Gaby Triquet as Alma-Rose Chapdelaine
- Maximilienne as Azelma Larouche
- André Bacqué as Samuel Chapdelaine
- Alexandre Rignault as Eutrope Gagnon
- Daniel Mendaille as Le curé
- Robert Le Vigan as Tit-Sèbe, le rebouteux
- Thomy Bourdelle as Esdras Chapdelaine
- Edmond Van Daële as Le docteur
- Émile Genevois as Tit-Bé Chapdelaine
- Fred Barry as Nazaire Larouche
- Pierre Laurel as Ephrem Surprenant
- Gustave Hamilton as Le vieux français
- Julien Clément as Le marchand Bédard
- Jacques Langevin as Edwige Légaré

== Production ==
The film's sets were designed by art director Jacques Krauss. Location shooting took place in Canada around Lake Mistassini. Some post-production work was also done at the Neuilly Studios in Paris.

== Reception ==
The film was a box office success on its release, ending a run of financial failures for Duvivier. The film was seen by 70,000 people in one week in Quebec. It was awarded the French Grand Prix, and was screened at the Venice Film Festival where it was given a Special Mention. A review in The New York Times praised it as "stirring, full-bodied and tremulously beautiful".

== Works cited ==
- Marshall, Bill (2001). Quebec National Cinema. McGill–Queen's University Press. ISBN 0-7735-2103-8.

== Bibliography ==
- McCann, Ben. Julien Duvivier. Oxford University Press, 2017.
