= Péribonka =

- Municipality
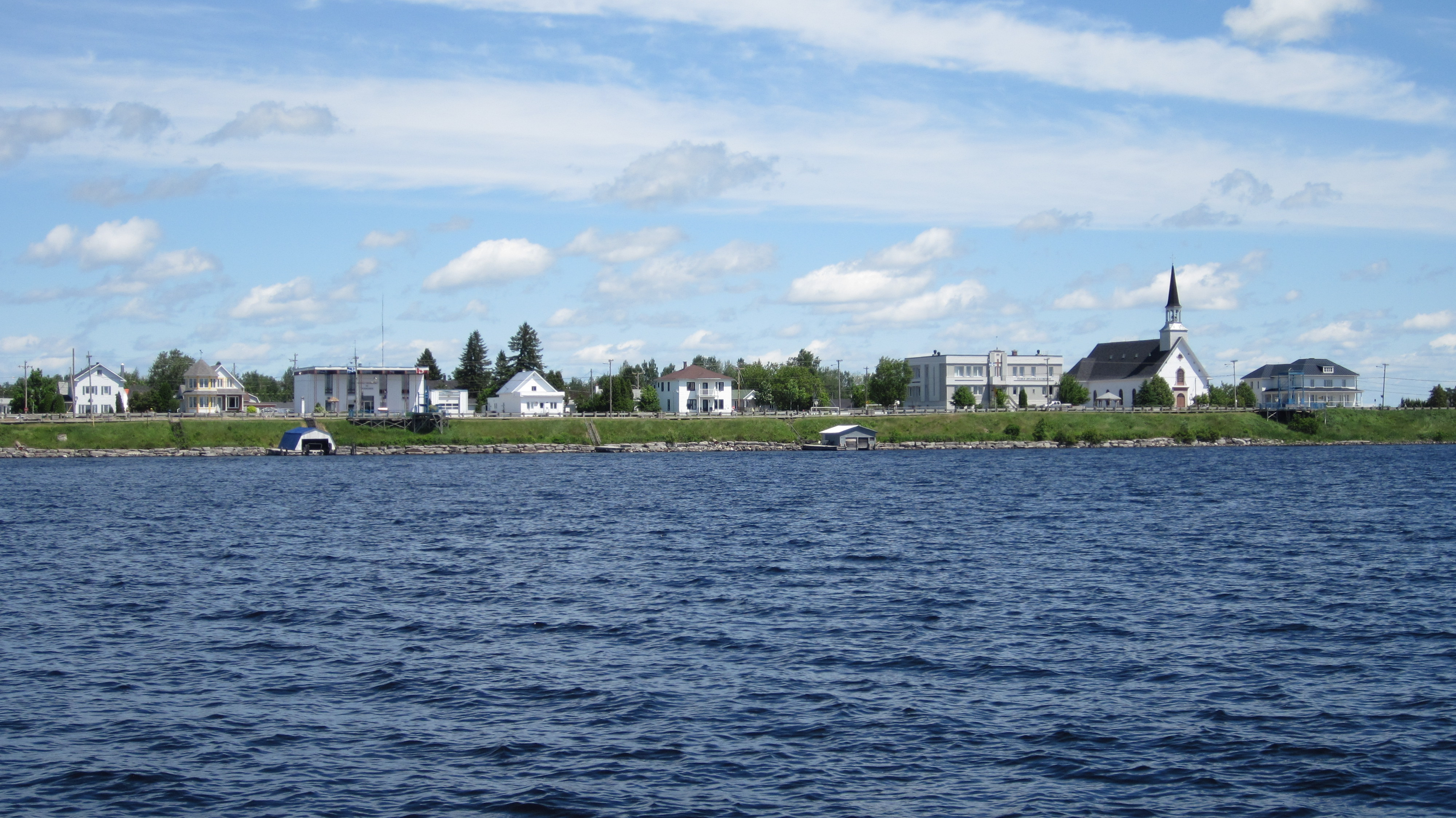
- Motto: Tes charmes me seduisent ("Your charms seduce me")

- Location in Saguenay–Lac-Saint-Jean Quebec
- Coordinates: 48°46′N 72°03′W
- Country: Canada
- Province: Quebec
- Region: Saguenay–Lac-Saint-Jean
- RCM: Maria-Chapdelaine
- Settled: 1888
- Constituted: September 19, 1908

Government
  - Mayor: Guylaine Proulx
  - Federal riding: Lac-Saint-Jean
  - Prov. riding: Roberval

Area
  - Total: 129.10 km^{2} (49.85 sq mi)
  - Land: 110.30 km^{2} (42.59 sq mi)

Population (2021)
  - Total: 489
  - Density: 4.4/km^{2} (11/sq mi)
  - Pop (2016–21): ▼5%
  - Dwellings: 304
- Time zone: UTC−5 (EST)
  - Summer (DST): UTC−4 (EDT)
- Postal code(s): G0W 2G0
- Area codes: 418 and 581
- Highways: R-169
- Website: www.peribonka.ca

Péribonka (French pronunciation: [peʁibɔ̃ka]) is a municipality in the Canadian province of Quebec, located in the Maria-Chapdelaine Regional County Municipality. It is situated at the mouth of the Peribonka River where it forms a bay on the north shore of Lac Saint-Jean.

Louis Hémon (1880-1913), a French writer, spent several months in Péribonka in 1912 during which he prepared the notes for his famous novel, Maria Chapdelaine.

Peribonka comes from the Innu word periwanga (or possibly from pelipaukau), meaning "river digging in/removing the sand", from the roots per or pen, "to remove", and anga, meaning "sand".

== History ==
In 1673, Jesuits François de Crespieul and Charles Albanel visited the place. But a village did not form until 1888 when the families of Édouard Niquet (or Niquette) and Édouard Milot arrived. Niquet had been sent there by Antoine Labelle, then Deputy Minister of Colonization of Quebec. A significant impetus to colonization came in 1897 with the founding of the Colonization and Repatriation Society of Quebec and Lac Saint-Jean, organization that encouraged the establishment of settlers and the repatriation of French-Canadian families exiled in the United States. The Peribonka Post Office opened in 1898.

Amédée Robitaille established the Peribonka Pulp Company which led to the founding of the municipality of Saint-Amédée in 1902. The following year, the Parish of Saint-Édouard-de-Peribonka was formed and named after Édouard Niquet and the adjacent river, that first got its name back in 1679. In 1909, the Municipality of Péribonka was founded by separating a portion of Saint-Amédée's territory. But in 1926, Saint-Amédée was completely annexed by Péribonka.

== Demographics ==
=== Population ===
Historical census populations – Péribonka

Year	Pop.	±%
1911	401	—
1921	889	+121.7%
1931	769	−13.5%
1941	674	−12.4%
1951	862	+27.9%
1956	894	+3.7%
1961	891	−0.3%

Year	Pop.	±%
1966	794	−10.9%
1971	780	−1.8%
1976	633	−18.8%
1981	675	+6.6%
1986	650	−3.7%
1991	635	−2.3%
1996	588	−7.4%

Year	Pop.	±%
2001	538	−8.5%
2006	541	+0.6%
2011	464	−14.2%
2016	515	+11.0%
2021	489	−5.0%

Source: Statistics Canada

Private dwellings occupied by usual residents: 234 (total dwellings: 304)

Mother tongue:

- English as first language: 0%
- French as first language: 99.0%
- English and French as first language: 1.0%
- Other as first language: 0%

== Notable people ==
- Louis Hémon (author of Maria Chapdelaine)
- Michel Goulet (professional ice hockey player and NHL Hall of Fame inductee)

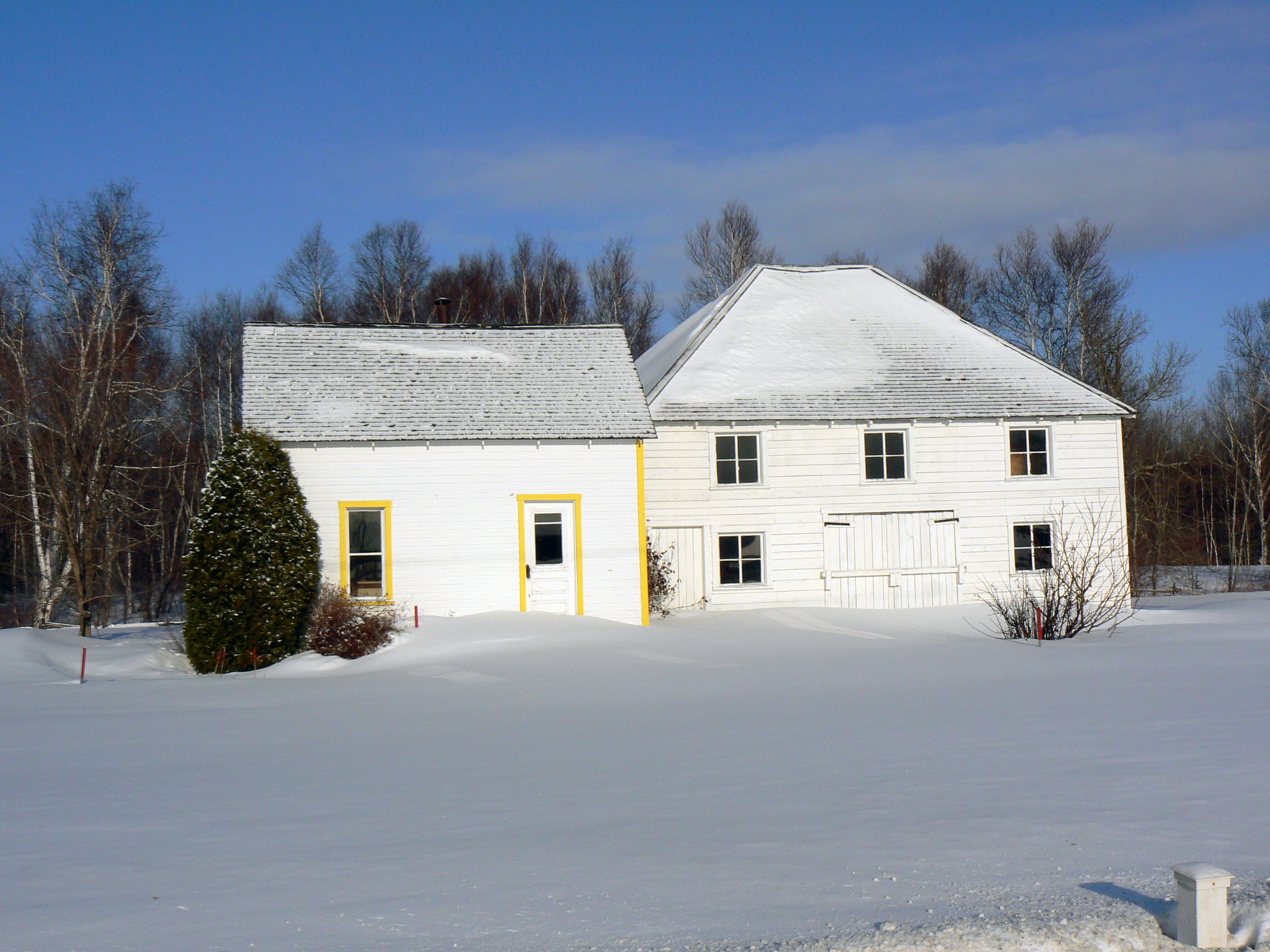
House of Louis Hémon
