= Rivière du Sault =

Rivière du Sault may refer to:

- Rivière du Sault (Charlevoix), a tributary of Ruisseau de la Martine, in Quebec, Canada
- Rivière du Petit Sault, a tributary of the Gulf of Saint Lawrence, in Quebec, Canada
- Rivière du Sault (Péribonka River), a tributary of the Péribonka River, in Quebec, Canada
- Rivière du Sault à la Puce, a tributary of the St. Lawrence River, in Quebec, Canada
- Rivière du Sault au Mouton, a tributary of the estuary of Saint Lawrence, in Quebec, Canada
- Rivière du Sault aux Cochons, a tributary of the Gulf of Saint Lawrence, in Quebec, Canada
- Rivière du Sault Plat, a tributary of the Gulf of Saint Lawrence, in Quebec, Canada
