= Sébastien Bouchard =

Canadian Army Brigadier General

- Born: Lac St-Jean
- Education: Royal Military College of Saint-Jean; Royal Military College of Canada; Canadian Forces College
- Spouse: Major (Retired) Karine Chayer
- Children: Maxym, Pier-Alex, Roxanne and Maud.
- Military career
- Allegiance: Canada
- Branch: Canadian Army
- Service years: 1988–present
- Rank: Brigadier-General
- Commands: Royal Military College of Canada (RMC); Second Canadian Division Support Group; National Support Element (NSE) for OP ATHENA
- Conflicts: War in Afghanistan
- Awards: Officer of the Order of Military Merit; Military Meritorious Service Medal; Canadian Forces' Decoration

Sébastien Bouchard OMM MSM CD is a Canadian Army brigadier-general who serves as Commandant of the Royal Military College of Canada (RMC). He served previously as Commanding Officer of the Second Canadian Division Support Group in Montreal, as Deputy Chief of Staff (Strategic) at the Canadian Joint Operations Command, and as the Commanding Officer for National Support Element (NSE) for OP ATHENA

== Career and education ==
Bouchard graduated from the Royal Military College of Canada with a bachelor's degree in mechanical engineering, and would later obtain his master's degree in defense studies from the Canadian Forces College.

Bouchard served as Commandant of RMC during the COVID-19 pandemic and made the decision to send most officer cadets to learn from home during the duration of the pandemic.

On February 9, 2021, Bouchard announced his intention to retire from the Canadian Armed Forces.
