= The Naked Heart =

1950 film

Maria Chapdelaine
- Directed by: Marc Allégret
- Written by: Marc Allégret; C.K. Jaeger; J. McLaren-Ross; Hugh Mills; Roger Vadim
- Produced by: Nelson Scott; Louis de Masure (uncredited)
- Starring: Michèle Morgan; Kieron Moore; Françoise Rosay
- Cinematography: Armand Thirard
- Edited by: Mireille Bessette; Maurice Rootes
- Music by: Guy Bernard
- Production companies: Everest Pictures Ltd.; Régina
- Distributed by: Filmsonor (France); British Lion Films (UK)
- Release date: 17 November 1950 (France)
- Running time: 100 minutes
- Country: United Kingdom / France
- Language: English/French
- Box office: £99,247 (UK)

The Naked Heart (French title: Maria Chapdelaine) is a 1950 British-French historical drama film directed by Marc Allégret and starring Michèle Morgan, Kieron Moore and Françoise Rosay. It was written by Allégret, C.K. Jaeger, J. McLaren-Ross, Hugh Mills and Roger Vadim based on the novel Maria Chapdelaine by Louis Hémon. The film was released in separate English and French versions. A previous film version was made in 1934.

It tells the story of a convent girl in a remote Northern Canadian village at the beginning of the 20th century.

== Cast ==
- Michèle Morgan as Maria Chapdelaine
- Kieron Moore as Lorenzo Surprenant
- Françoise Rosay as Laura Chapdelaine
- Jack Watling as Robert Gagnon
- Philippe Lemaire as François Paradis
- Nancy Price as Theresa Suprenant
- Francis de Wolff as Papa Suprenant
- George Woodbridge as Samuel Chapdelaine
- Brian Roper as Tit-Be Chapdelaine

== Reception ==
The Monthly Film Bulletin wrote: "This tedious film is remarkable for bad acting and appalling dialogue."

Variety wrote: "Inadequate scripting and leisurely direction gives the cast little opportunity. Michele Morgan makes a valiant effort as Maria Chapdelaine, but Francoise Rosay has no chance at all as her mother. The three men in Maria's life are played by Kieron Moore, Philippe Lemaire and Jack Watling. The latter, although portraying an illiterate, speaks with a perfect Oxford accent!"
