= Jean de Quen =

French Jesuit missionary

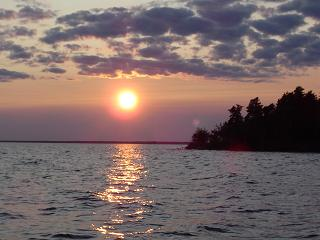
Lac St Jean

Jean de Quen (May c. 1603 in Amiens, France – 8 October 1659, in Quebec City, Canada) was a French Jesuit missionary, priest and historian. As head of Jesuit missions of New France, he founded the mission to Saguenay. In 1647, Jean de Quen was the first European to reach the shores of Piékouagami (Lac Saint-Jean).

== Early life ==
Born c. 1603, in Amiens, Picardy, Jean de Quen was about 17 years old when he joined the Jesuits on 13 September 1620. He taught for three years at the Collège in Eu and then left for New France. He arrived in Quebec City on 17 August 1635, where he taught at the College of Quebec, which opened the same year for Franch and First Nations boys. He taught there for two years before joining the Sillery mission, an initiative aimed at educating the Native peoples. He later left the mission and went back to Quebec to minister to the Parish of Notre-Dame-de-la-Recouvrance. After a fire destroyed the school, chapel, and Jesuits’ residence in 1640, he resumed his service in Sillery and moved on to a Trois-Rivières post, where he was involved in the establishing another mission.

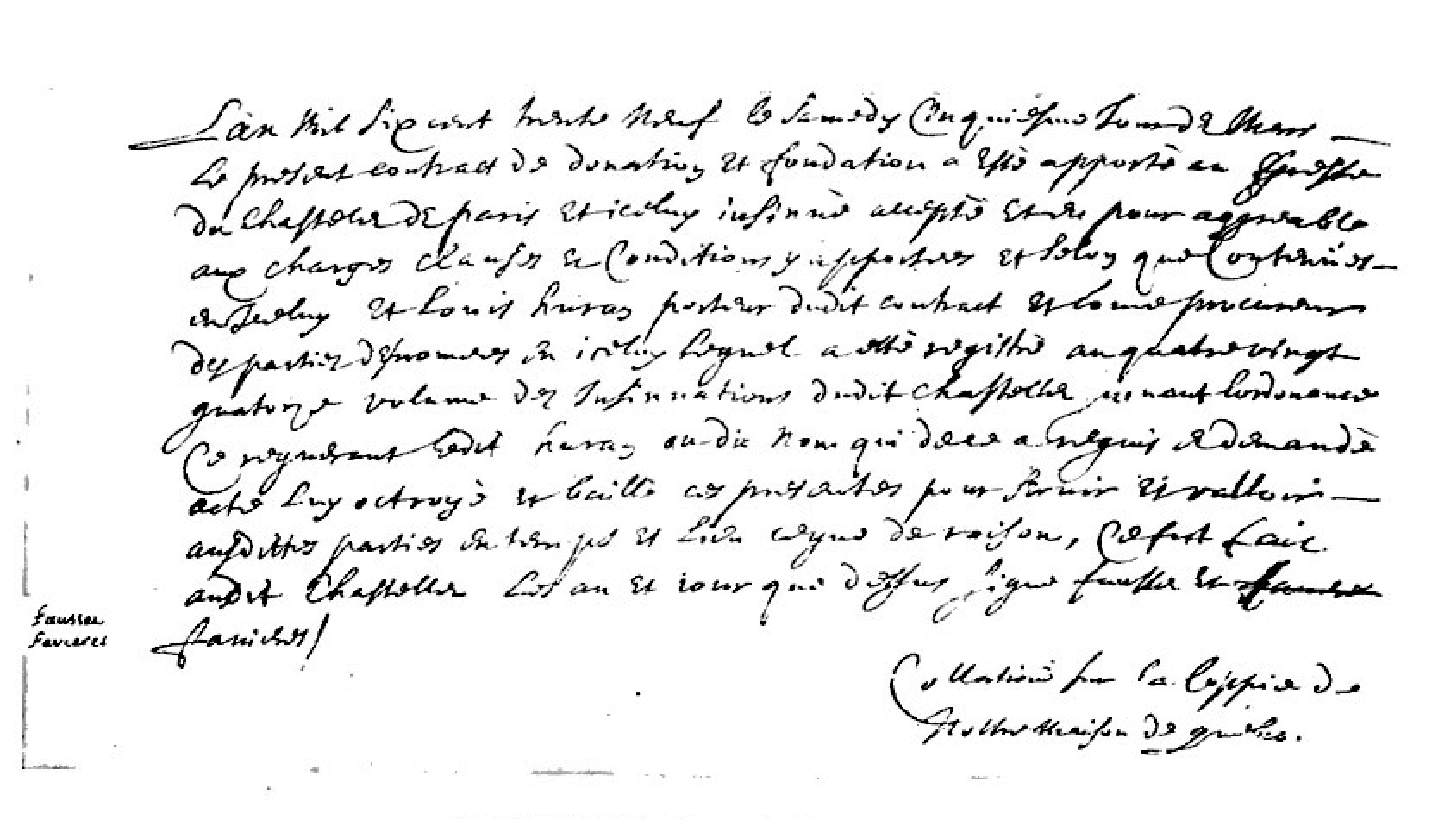
22 February 1639 Sample of handwriting

In 1640, he went back to Sillery and concerned himself with the hospital, Hôtel-Dieu. There, he wore himself down but recovered quickly and was sent to the Trois-Rivières residence. He returned the following year to Sillery and was in charge of that mission centre for eight years (1642–1649). He fulfilled a very active ministry there, which brought him into contact with First Nations individuals from multiple locations, more particularly Montagnais people, whose language he learned with proficiency.

== Tadoussac ==
In the spring of 1642, he was entrusted with the Montagnais mission with which he concerned himself for 11 years. The mission had been founded the preceding year at Tadoussac, where between spring and the end of August the fur trade brought First Nations people from all parts of the vast territory of the Saguenay. He was respected by the Montagnais; with the aid of Fathers Jacques Buteux, Gabriel Druillettes, Martin de Lyonne, and Charles Albanel, he created a form of summer mission suited to the existence of those nomadic peoples and made it successful. He formed a nucleus of Christians, who helped him reach the most distant groups. It was at Tadoussac that the first stone church in Quebec was constructed in 1646.

== Lac Saint-Jean ==
No European had officially explored the entire length of the Saguenay and the large lake that appeared on a map produced in 1544 by the geographer Jean Alfonse. Previous explorers' attempts at getting to the lake proved futile because the Native peoples “avoided letting the white men know about [...] Lake Saint-Jean and the inland route to the Saguenay.” De Quen expressed a desire to visit the members of the Porcupine Nation, who were prevented from coming to Tadoussac because of disease. He left the Tadoussac mission on 11 July 1647, in a small bark canoe. Bringing two Montagnais with him as guides, he travelled up the Saguenay to Chicoutimi and took the river of the same name as far as Lakes Kenogami and Kénogamishish. The group then entered Lake Saint-Jean via Belle-Rivière.

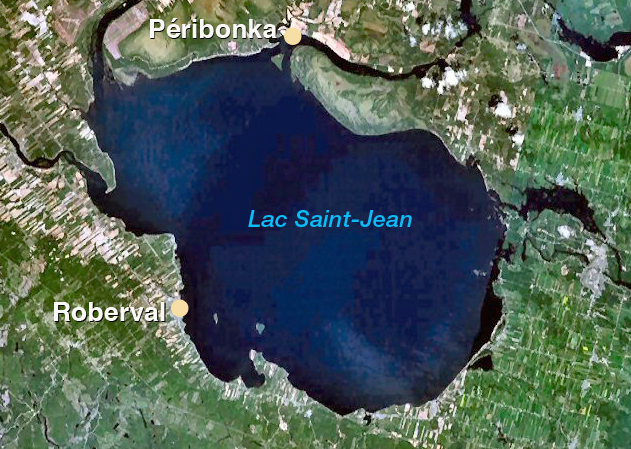
Traversée-Lac St-Jean-Québec

Upon seeing Lac Saint-Jean, de Quen wrote in his journal:

"This lake is so large, that one hardly sees its banks; it seems to be round in shape. It is deep and very full of fish; they fish here for pike, perch, salmon, trout, dories, white-fish, carp, and many other kinds. It is surrounded by a flat country, terminating in high mountains, distant 3, four or five leagues from its shores. It is fed by the waters of fifteen rivers, or thereabout, which serve as highways for the small nations which are back in the country, to come to fish in this lake, and to maintain the intercourse and friendship which they have among themselves."

In 1651, he founded the Ange-Gardien mission, the first permanent European settlement at Sept-Îles.

He died of fever on October 8, 1659, and was buried at Quebec City. His remains were discovered in 1878, and were transferred to the Ursuline chapel in 1891.

== Legacy ==
The Centre d'histoire et d'archéologie de la Métabetchouane contains an exhibition discussing the explorer's life and works, as well as a memorial for him.

Avenue Jean-de-Quen in Quebec City is named after him.

== Sources ==
- Virtual Museum Of New France
- Dictionary of Canadian Biography Online
