= Saint-Ludger-de-Milot =

- Municipality
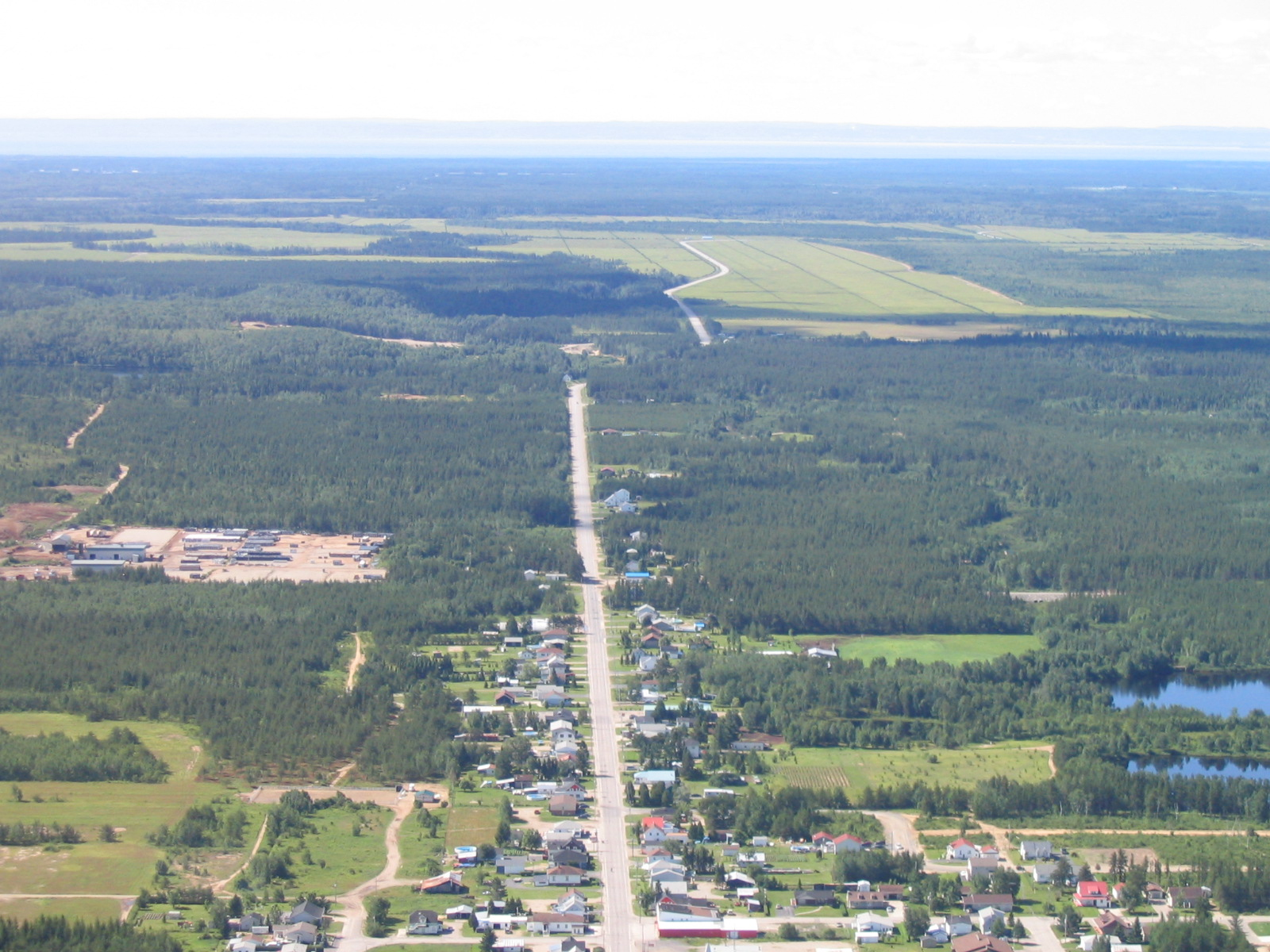
- Motto(s): Venir chez nous, c’est y prendre goût

- Location in Saguenay–Lac-Saint-Jean Quebec.
- Coordinates: 48°54′N 71°49′W
- Country: Canada
- Province: Quebec
- Region: Saguenay–Lac-Saint-Jean
- RCM: Lac-Saint-Jean-Est
- Settled: 1931
- Constituted: January 1, 1948

Government
  - Mayor: Marc Laliberté
  - Federal riding: Jonquière—Hébertville—Pays-des-Bleuets
  - Prov. riding: Lac-Saint-Jean

Area
  - Total: 111.20 km^{2} (42.93 sq mi)
  - Land: 107.46 km^{2} (41.49 sq mi)

Population (2021)
  - Total: 637
  - Density: 5.9/km^{2} (15/sq mi)
  - Pop 2016-2021: ▼2.2%
  - Dwellings: 401
- Time zone: UTC−5 (EST)
  - Summer (DST): UTC−4 (EDT)
- Postal code(s): G0W 2B0
- Area codes: 418 and 581
- Highways: No major routes
- Website: www.ville.st-ludger-de-milot.qc.ca

Saint-Ludger-de-Milot is a municipality in Quebec, Canada.

== Geographic location ==
The territory of the parish of Saint-Ludger-de-Milot is located north of Lake Saint-Jean and the Dalmas canton, between the Alex and Petite Péribonka rivers. Founded in 1931, this parish today has around 750 inhabitants.

== Colonization ==
June 19 marks the anniversary of the arrival of the first settlers. The colonization of Milot Township was merely an emergency measure to counter the devastating effects of the crisis. A global phenomenon, the crisis also affected the Saguenay region, forcing many businesses to close. The government therefore took steps to provide direct aid to ensure that thousands of unemployed city dwellers had the necessities for their survival:

food; fuel; clothing; housing.

However, this direct aid was only a short-term solution. It was necessary to provide city dwellers with a means of self-sufficiency. Thus, a system for colonizing the uncultivated lands of Lac-Saint-Jean was established. Each town was allocated a specific colonization area where its population could learn the basics of agriculture.

For its part, the Milot township was awarded to the town of Jonquière, which recruited families without income, willing to relocate in the hope of a better life. These settler families received a wide range of benefits:

a plot of land;

a system of pitons;

animals: a cow and a horse; lumber for construction; work clothes; $25 per month per family.

== Religious Presence ==
From the very beginning of colonization, religious figures came to ascertain the religious fervor of the inhabitants of the new settlement. Since Jonquière was responsible for colonizing Milot Township, it fell to the priests of that town to carry out this task.

== Church Construction ==
In the winter of 1937-1938, wood was gathered and prepared for the upcoming construction of the church. It wasn't until the fall of 1938 that they were ready to begin the foundations, after the parish priest had blessed the site.

== School Board ==
The year 1938 marked the beginning of the first educational structure. Since the education system was not centralized at the time, each village had to develop its own educational plan. To this end, an independent school board was established to manage the various educational institutions within its territory.

It was therefore during the year 1938 that the municipality acquired this structure with, at its head, Mr. Joseph Tremblay (Gasson), first president of the Saint-Ludger-de-Milot school board.

== Telephone ==
The first community telephone line was installed in the spring of 1946. The exchange was located at the home of Georges-Arthur Tremblay, where his wife and one of their daughters operated it. Businesses, the rectory, and a few private individuals had their own lines; others often had to wait a long time for their turn, especially when the neighbor was busy chatting.

== Transportation ==
From 1945 to 1956, the population benefited from bus service that ran twice a day between Milot and Dolbeau. Given the distance from the town and the limited number of car owners at that time, it was a necessary service. In fact, it wasn't uncommon to see schoolteachers going to the hairdresser on Saturdays.

== Medical Services ==
The parish of Milot has a medical services center that has been operating for 60 years. It was in March 1940 that the first nurse, Miss Germaine Lalancette, was welcomed. Upon her arrival, she resided in the rectory until the construction of the building that would serve as a clinic was completed, that is, during the summer.

This medical service center was then staffed, until 1978, by the nurses: Lemieux, Garon, Savard, and Lavoie. During these years, it benefited from the expertise of doctors, including Dr. Rochette from Péribonka, Dr. Plante, and Dr. Morin, who were willing to travel to the area.

== Demographics ==
Population trend:

- Population in 2021: 637 (2016 to 2021 population change: -2.2%)
- Population in 2016: 651
- Population in 2011: 678
- Population in 2006: 727
- Population in 2001: 764
- Population in 1996: 752
- Population in 1991: 721
- Population in 1986: 750
- Population in 1981: 783
- Population in 1976: 789
- Population in 1971: 772
- Population in 1966: 796
- Population in 1961: 982
- Population in 1956: 999
- Population in 1951: 928

Private dwellings occupied by usual residents: 318 (total dwellings: 401)

Mother tongue:

- English as first language: 0.8%
- French as first language: 98.4%
- English and French as first language: 0.8%
- Other as first language: 0%

== See also ==
- List of municipalities in Quebec
