= Passes-Dangereuses =

- Unorganized territory

- Location in Saguenay–Lac-Saint-Jean Quebec
- Coordinates: 48°58′N 72°04′W
- Country: Canada
- Province: Quebec
- Region: Saguenay–Lac-Saint-Jean
- RCM: Maria-Chapdelaine
- Constituted: unspecified

Government
  - Federal riding: Jonquière—Hébertville—Pays-des-Bleuets
  - Prov. riding: Lac-Saint-Jean and Roberval

Area
  - Total: 16,857.50 km^{2} (6,508.72 sq mi)
  - Land: 15,579.11 km^{2} (6,015.13 sq mi)

Population (2021)
  - Total: 210
  - Density: 0/km^{2} (0/sq mi)
  - Pop (2016–21): ▲14.1%
  - Dwellings: 151
- Time zone: UTC−05:00 (EST)
  - Summer (DST): UTC−04:00 (EDT)
- Area codes: 418 and 581

Passes-Dangereuses (French pronunciation: [pas dɑ̃ʒʁøz]; until May 2009: Chute-des-Passes) is an unorganized territory in the Canadian province of Quebec, located between the Peribonka River on the east and the Mistassibi River on the west.

== Geography ==
Until 2024, the territory, part of the regional county municipality of Maria-Chapdelaine, covered a land area of 15,579.11 km^{2} (6,015.13 sq mi) and had a population of 210 as of the Canada 2021 Census, all living in the village of Sainte-Élisabeth-de-Proulx (48°57′51″N 72°04′05″W), which is north-east of Dolbeau-Mistassini in the geographic township of Proulx.

== Toponymy ==
The territory was formed in January 1981, and was then known as "Lac-Saint-Jean-Ouest, partie Chute-des-Passes". This was shortened to Chute-des-Passes in August 1986. On May 23, 2009, the territory was renamed to Passes-Dangereuses in order to avoid confusion with the hamlet of Chute-des-Passes in the neighbouring Unorganized Territory of Mont-Valin.

The territory's name Passes-Dangereuses (French for "dangerous pass") refers to a series of rapids and chutes that stir up the Peribonka River for a distance of about 15 km (9.3 mi) from Lake Peribonka's outlet downstream. This section of the river flows through impressive escarpments of over 100 m (330 ft) high and was first identified as "the nasty portage" by Jesuit Pierre-Michel Laure on his map of 1731. The following year, this missionary used the First Nations name Katchiskataouakigs, also used by Bellin on his map of 1744. A map of Jonathan Carver from 1776 indicated "Falls and Rift" to characterize the place. Not until the end of the 19th century did the current toponym begin to appear on survey maps. In 1941, Alcan built at the head of these rapids a dam called Chute-des-Passes, forming Lake Peribonka behind it. The dam's name also refers to the nearby hamlet that formed the east side of the river, and was the former name of Passes-Dangereuses Territory.

== Demographics ==
Population trend:

- Population in 2021: 210 (2016 to 2021 population change: 14.1%)
- Population in 2016: 184
- Population in 2011: 226
- Population in 2006: 174
- Population in 2001: 188
- Population in 1996: 192
- Population in 1991: 207

Private dwellings occupied by usual residents: 104 (total dwellings: 151)
