= Sainte-Monique, Saguenay–Lac-Saint-Jean =

Sainte-Monique
- Municipality
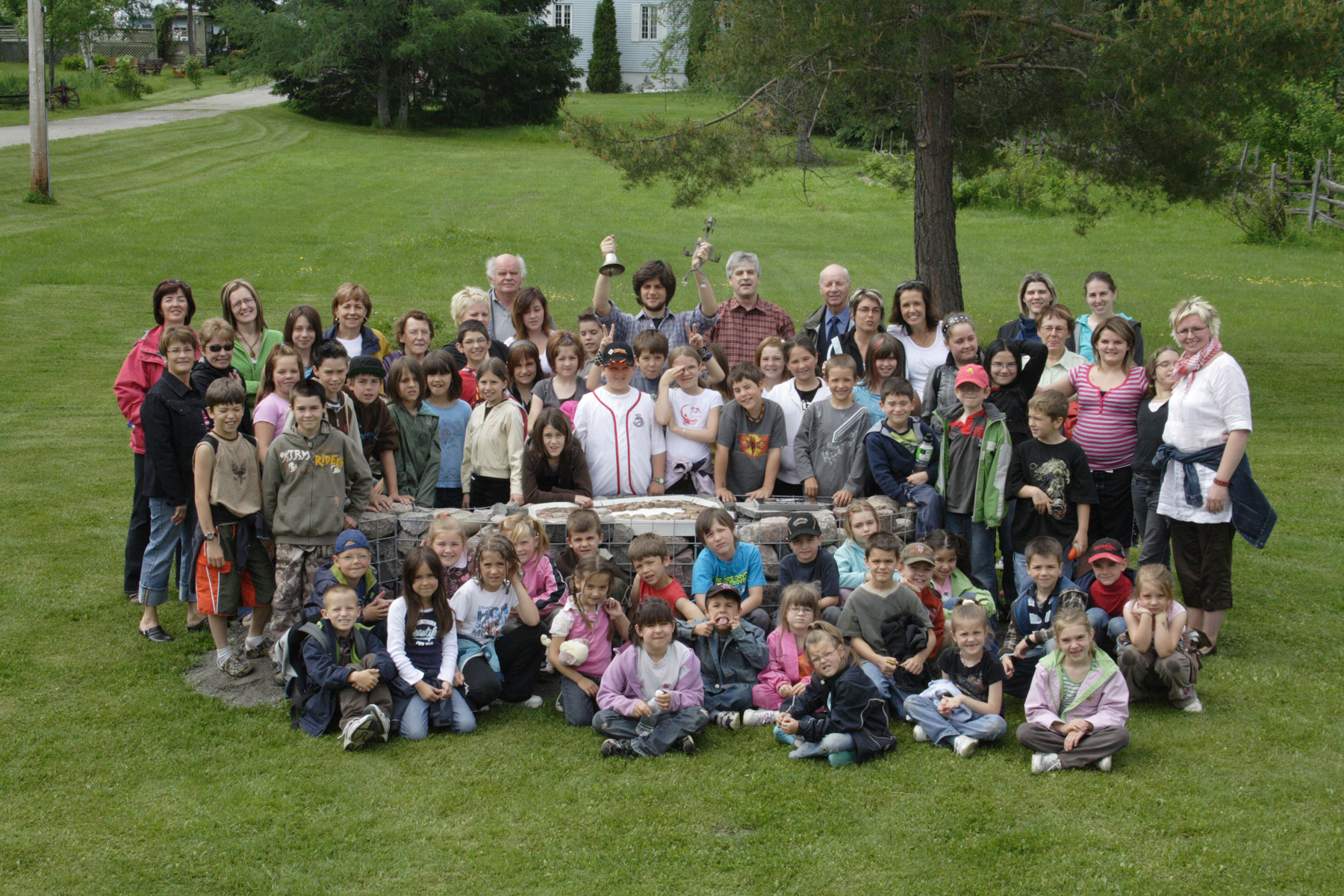

- Location in Saguenay–Lac-Saint-Jean Quebec.
- Coordinates: 48°44′N 71°51′W
- Country: Canada
- Province: Quebec
- Region: Saguenay–Lac-Saint-Jean
- RCM: Lac-Saint-Jean-Est
- Settled: 1898
- Constituted: August 30, 1930

Government
  - Mayor: Mario Desbiens
  - Federal riding: Lac-Saint-Jean
  - Prov. riding: Lac-Saint-Jean

Area
  - Total: 160.30 km^{2} (61.89 sq mi)
  - Land: 155.01 km^{2} (59.85 sq mi)

Population (2011)
  - Total: 865
  - Density: 5.6/km^{2} (15/sq mi)
  - Pop 2006-2011: ▼5.4%
  - Dwellings: 453
- Time zone: UTC−5 (EST)
  - Summer (DST): UTC−4 (EDT)
- Postal code(s): G0W 2T0
- Area codes: 418 and 581
- Highways: R-169
- Website: www.ville.ste-monique.qc.ca

Sainte-Monique (French pronunciation: [sɛ̃t mɔnik]) is a municipality in Quebec, Canada. It is sometimes known as Sainte-Monique-de-Honfleur (for example, on its official website).

== Demographics ==
Population trend:

- Population in 2021: 851 (2016 to 2021 population change: 4.0%)
- Population in 2016: 818
- Population in 2011: 865
- Population in 2006: 914
- Population in 2001: 930
- Population in 1996: 954
- Population in 1991: 910
- Population in 1986: 903
- Population in 1981: 927
- Population in 1976: 847
- Population in 1971: 1,040
- Population in 1966: 1,225
- Population in 1961: 1,299
- Population in 1956: 1,208
- Population in 1951: 1,099
- Population in 1941: 690
- Population in 1931: 493

Private dwellings occupied by usual residents: 384 (total dwellings: 491)

Mother tongue:

- English as first language: 1.2%
- French as first language: 97.1%
- English and French as first language: 1.2%
- Other as first language: 0.0%

== See also ==
- List of municipalities in Quebec
