= Lac Saint-Jean =

- Lake St. John
- Piekuakamu (Innu)
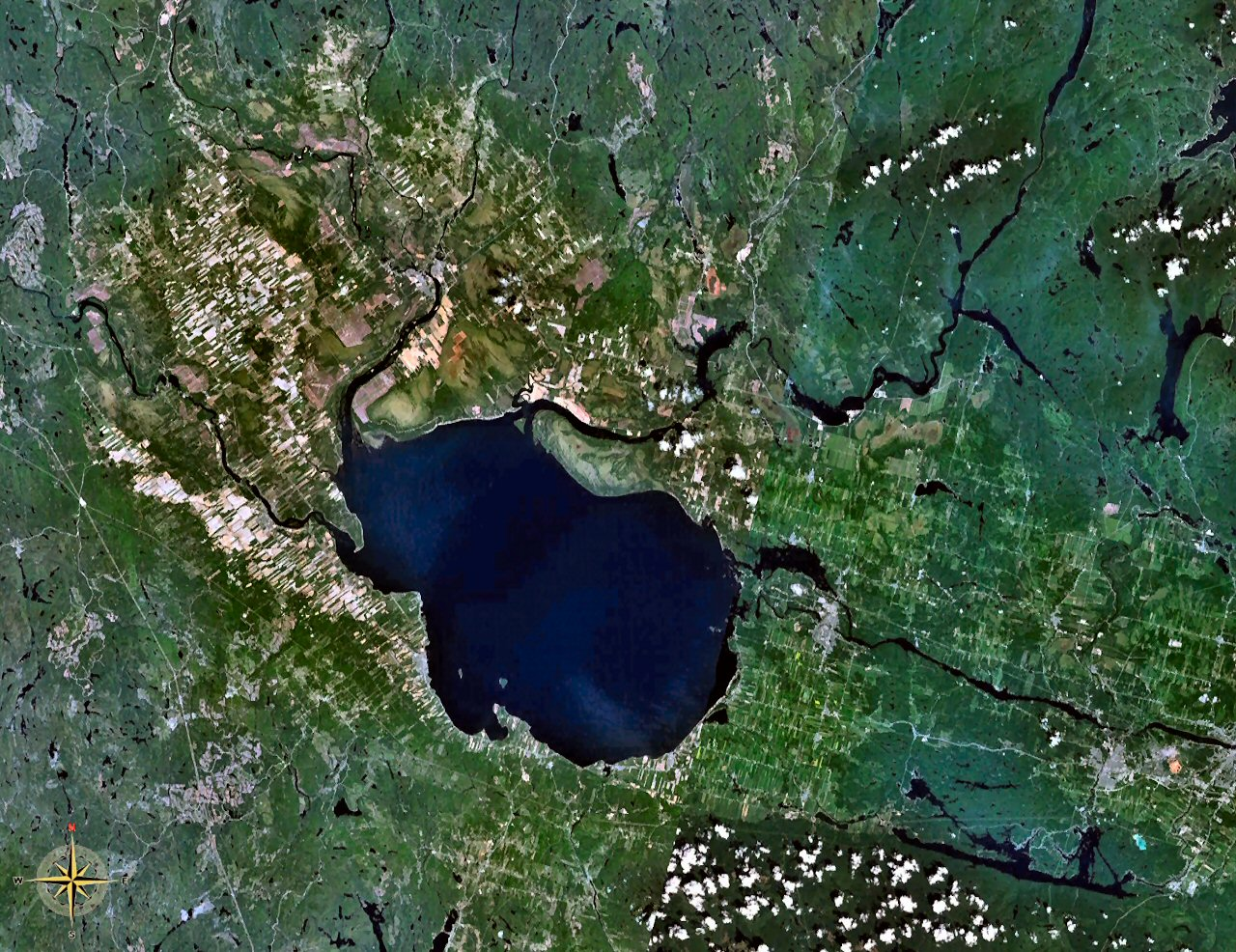

- Location in Quebec
- Location: Saguenay–Lac-Saint-Jean region, Quebec
- Coordinates: 48°35′40″N 72°01′48″W
- Type: rift valley lake
- Primary inflows: Ashuapmushuan, Mistassini, Peribonka, Des Aulnaies, Métabetchouan, Ouiatchouane
- Primary outflows: Saguenay River
- Catchment area: 71,947 km^{2} (27,779 sq mi)
- Basin countries: Canada
- Max. length: 43.8 km (27.2 mi)
- Max. width: 24 km (15 mi)
- Surface area: 1,053 km^{2} (407 sq mi)
- Average depth: 11.4 m (37 ft)
- Max. depth: 63.1 m (207 ft)
- Water volume: 11.9 km^{3} (2.9 cu mi)
- Surface elevation: 99.6 m (327 ft)

Lac Saint-Jean (French: [lak sɛ̃ ʒɑ̃], Quebec French pronunciation: [lak sẽ ʒã]) is a large, relatively shallow lake in south-central Quebec, Canada, in the Laurentian Highlands. It is situated 206 km (128 mi) north of the Saint Lawrence River, into which it drains via the Saguenay River. It covers an area of 1,053 km^{2} (407 sq mi), and is 63.1 m (207 ft) at its deepest point. Its name in the Innu language is Piekuakamu. Lac Saint-Jean has been mapped and known in English as Lake St. John although in recent years English speakers have tended to use its French name.

== Description ==
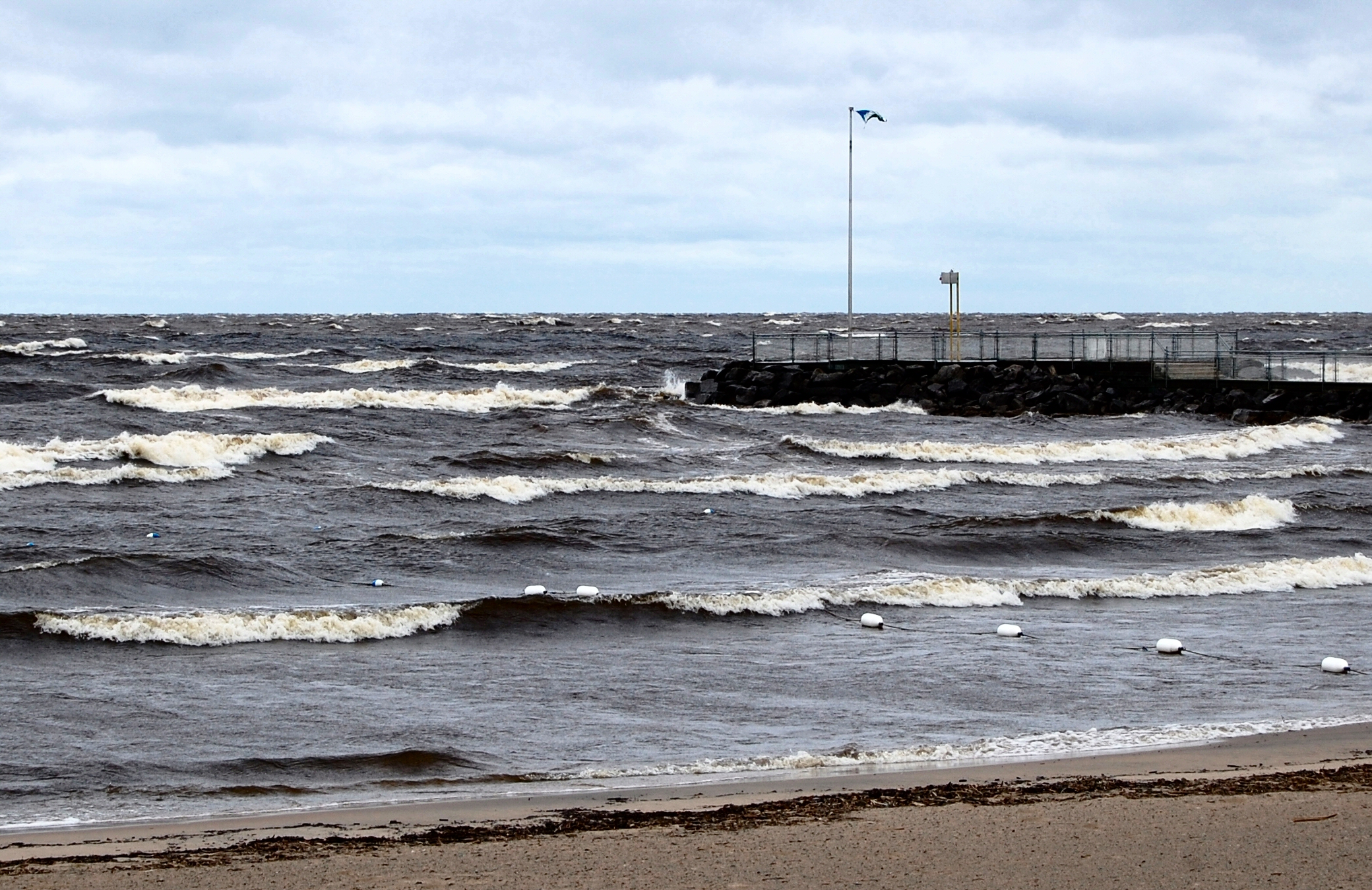
Lac Saint-Jean from Saint-Gédéon

The lake is fed by dozens of small rivers, including the Ashuapmushuan, the Mistassini, the Peribonka, the Des Aulnaies, the Métabetchouane, and the Ouiatchouane. The towns on its shores include Alma, Dolbeau-Mistassini, Roberval, Normandin, and Saint-Félicien. Three Regional County Municipalities lie on its shores: Lac-Saint-Jean-Est, Le Domaine-du-Roy, and Maria-Chapdelaine.

== History ==
The lake is named Piekuakami by the Innu, the Indigenous people who occupied the area at the time of European arrival. It was given its French name by Jean de Quen, a Jesuit missionary who in 1647 was the first European to reach its shores.

Industry on the lake was dominated by the fur trade until the 19th century. Colonization began in the Saguenay–Lac-Saint-Jean region in the early 19th century and continued intensively until the early 20th century. Industry was mainly forestry and agriculture. In the 20th century, pulp and paper mills and aluminum smelting rose to importance, encouraged by hydroelectric dams at Alma and on the Péribonka River. Lac Saint-Jean also has an important summer resort and sport-fishing industry.

The area is featured in the classic French-language novel Maria Chapdelaine by Louis Hémon published in 1914 and subsequently translated into twenty languages.

In the 1940s, during World War II, Lac Saint-Jean, along with various other regions within Canada, such as the Saguenay, Saint Helen's Island and Hull, Quebec, hosted prisoner-of-war camps. Lac Saint-Jean's was numbered and remained unnamed just like most of Canada's other war prisons. The prisoners of war (POWs) were classified into categories including their nationality and civilian or military status. By 1942 this region had two camps with at least 50 POWs. Prisoners worked the land, including lumbering and assisting in the production of pulp and paper.

== Geology ==
The bedrock of the Saguenay-Lac-Saint-Jean region consists largely of Precambrian igneous and metamorphic rocks. They are mostly composed of high-grade metamorphic rocks, amphibolite to granulite gneiss, that are intruded by anorthosite, mangerite, charnockite, and granite plutonic rocks. The Lac Saint-Jean anorthosite is the major mafic intrusion present in the area. These rocks comprise the Grenville Province of southern Quebec. It consists of fragments of island arcs and continental crust accreted to the south-eastern edge of Precambrian North American, Laurentia.

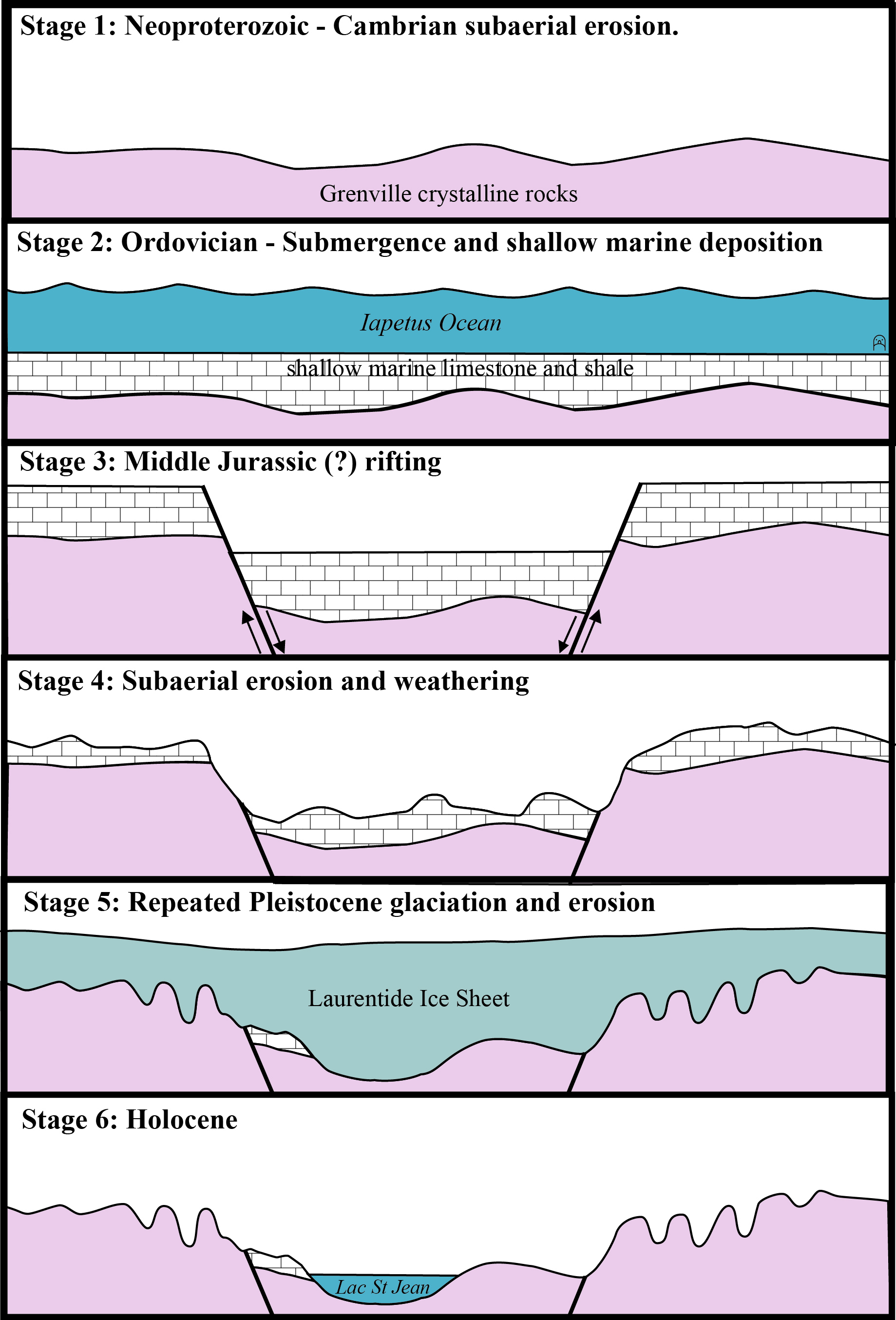
Schematic geologic cross section of Lac Saint Jean and enclosing Saguenay Graben illustrating the major stages in their geologic development

Lac Saint-Jean lies within an elongated rift valley that is known as the Lac Saint-Jean Lowlands. These lowlands are an elongated flat-bottomed basin formed by the Saguenay Graben by the displacement of Grenville crystalline rocks. This basin is 250 km (160 mi) long and 50 km (31 mi) wide. This basin is bounded by normal faults running parallel to its length. It extends from just west of Lac Saint-Jean along the Saguenay River to the Saint Lawrence Valley where is it truncated by St. Lawrence rift system.

Preserved within the down-faulted interior of the Saguenay Graben are two large eroded, isolated patches, known as outliers, of Paleozoic, Middle Ordovician, sedimentary rock composed of limestones and shales overlying Precambrian basement. The Lac-Saint-Jean outlier rests against the south wall of the graben south of Lac Saint-Jean and extends to the west of the lake. The Chicoutimi (Saguenay) outlier rests against the north wall of the graben and extends southward to a few kilometers from the Saguenay River north of Chicoutimi. These Middle Ordovician sedimentary rocks consist of sandstones, micritic limestones and highly fossiliferous, alternating beds of limestones and shales. These rocks have been preferentially eroded by repeated glaciations exhuming the Saguenay Graben.

The Saguenay Graben that undelies Lac Saint-Jean Lowlands has controlled the deposition and the accumulation of Quaternary deposits (sand, gravel, silt, and clay), which can reach up to 180 m (590 ft) in thickness beneath the central lowlands. The Quaternary sediments include glacial, marine, glaciofluvial sediments and post-glacial alluvial and delta plain sediments.

The area was covered by ice sheets several times throughout the Pleistocene. The valley formed by the Saguenay Graben being oriented more or less parallel to the glacial flow, became a preferred path for ice flow and resulted in deep excavation of the bedrock.The glaciers cut into the graben and widened it in some places as well as making it considerable deeper in others. At the time of retreat of the last ice sheet, the region had been depressed below contemporaneous sea level. As a result, as the Laurentide Ice Sheet retreated, the Saguenay Graben was flooded by marine waters to form the Laflamme Sea. As the land rose in response to considerable Post-glacial rebound, the bottom of the Saguenay Graben was blanketed by the Saguenay River with deltaic and terrestrial fluvial sediments to form the modern day Lac Saint-Jean Lowlands.

== Notable people ==
- Sébastien Bouchard, a brigadier-general who serves as Commandant of the Royal Military College of Canada (RMC).
- Jean Ratelle, NHL Hall of Famer and Team Canada 1972 member
- Mario Chevrette, Ph.D. of Molecular and Cell Biology and McGill Professor
- Guillaume Côté, National Ballet of Canada principal dancer

== See also ==
- List of lakes of Quebec
