= Maria Chapdelaine =

1913 novel by Louis Hémon

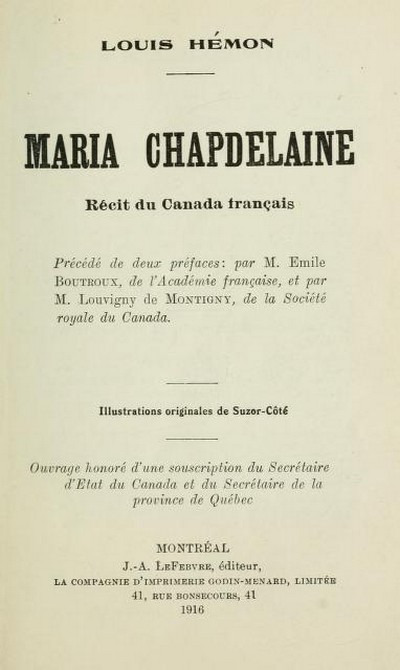

Maria Chapdelaine is a romance novel written in 1913 by the Breton writer Louis Hémon, who was then residing in Quebec. Aimed at young French and Quebecois people, the book had been included in school curricula, translated, and has been extensively analyzed and adapted.

== Plot ==
After the man she loves dies suddenly, Maria must choose which of two suitors to marry. One offers a change to life in the big city, but Maria decides to stay in the countryside.

== Publication ==
Hémon, a journalist, came to rural Quebec to gather ideas for a novel. He supported himself by working on a farm. After hearing various stories from area residents, he wrote a romantic story, basing the character of the heroine on a young woman he had met. In 1913, he submitted the manuscript for publication; he then left Quebec to travel to western Canada, but was hit by a train and died before learning of his book's success. His book was illustrated by a famous French Canadian painter Clarence Gagnon.

In 1921, the book was translated into English by Andrew McPhail. A translation by W. H. Blake was published the same year.

== Adaptations ==
The novel has had four film adaptations, two French and two Québécois: in 1934, by Julien Duvivier, with Madeleine Renaud (as Maria Chapdelaine), and Jean Gabin (as François Paradis), partly filmed in Péribonka; in 1950 by Marc Allégret in a free interpretation of the work called The Naked Heart; in 1984 by Gilles Carle with Carole Laure; and in 2021 by Sébastien Pilote.

The novel has also been adapted as plays, illustrated novels, radio-novels, and televised series. The most noted theatrical adaptation was by Paul Gury.

A 40-page children's version, featuring art by Rajka Kupesic, was published in 2004 by Tundra Books, and was nominated for the Governor General's Award for English-language children's illustration at the 2005 Governor General's Awards.

Authors have even published continuations of the novel.

The novel has been adapted as an opera in four acts by composer Jim Leonard. It premiered in 2019 in Vernon, BC.
