= Louis Hémon =

French writer (1880–1913)

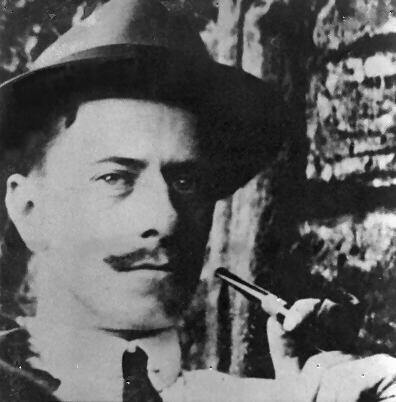
- Hémon in 1911
- Born: 12 October 1880; Brest, France
- Died: 8 July 1913 (aged 32); Chapleau, Ontario
- Occupation: Novelist
- Children: 1
- Writing career
- Years active: 1911–1913
- Notable work: Maria Chapdelaine

Louis Hémon (12 October 1880 – 8 July 1913), was a French writer, best known for his novel Maria Chapdelaine.

== Biography ==
Louis Hémon was born in Brest, France. In Paris, where he resided with his family, he was enrolled in the Montaigne and Louis-le-Grand secondary schools. A bilingual secretary in several maritime agencies, he collaborated, starting from 1904, in a Parisian sports journal. After his studies of law and oriental languages in the Sorbonne, he moved to London.

In 1911, he moved to Canada, settling initially in Montreal. Hémon wrote Maria Chapdelaine during his time working at a farm in the Lac Saint-Jean region.

Hémon died when he was struck by a train at Chapleau, Ontario. He never saw the widespread publication of his landmark novel.

Since his death, Maria Chapdelaine has been translated into more than 20 languages in 23 countries, while other novels were published posthumously. The work was also celebrated through a series of paintings by Canadian artist, Rajka Kupesic.

Hémon had one daughter, Lydia-Kathleen, from a relationship in England with Lydia O'Kelly.

He is the subject of two biographical studies, L'aventure Louis Hémon (1974) by Alfred Ayotte and Victor Tremblay, and Louis Hémon, le fou du lac by Mathieu-Robert Sauvé.

== Bibliography ==
- 1908: Lizzie Blakeston
- 1913: Maria Chapdelaine
- 1923: La Belle que voilà
- 1924: Colin-Maillard
- 1926: Battling Malone, pugiliste
- 1950: Monsieur Ripois et la Némésis
