= Damville (Quebec township) =

Township in Quebec, Canada

The township Damville is located in the unorganized territory of Rivière-Mistassini, in the Maria-Chapdelaine Regional County Municipality, in the regional administrative office of Mauricie, in province of Quebec, in Canada. It was proclaimed on June 5, 1965.

Forestry is the main economic activity in this forest area. Two secondary forest roads cross the uninhabited township.

== Geography ==
The township extends mainly on the north shore of the course of the Ashuapmushuan River, to the northwest of Lac Saint-Jean. The Ashuapmushuan River crosses the township to the southeast. The latter collects the waters of the Brochets River, which is the outlet of Damville Lake. The Ashuapmushuan river also collects the waters of several small tributaries (coming from the north) which flow between the Brochets river and the Notaire island.

== Toponymy ==
The toponym "canton Damville" evokes the life work of François-Christophe de Lévis, Duke of Damville, brother of the Duke of Ventadour. The duke served as the sixth viceroy of New France, from 1644 to 1660. Presently, Damville is the capital of the canton of 'Eure sur l'Iton (arrondissement of Évreux), France. According to Albert Dauzat, the meaning of the term "Damville" would be "domini villa", the domain of the lord. The toponym appears in 1926 in the work "Geographical Names of the Province of Quebec".

The toponym "Damville" was formalized on June 18, 1993, by the Commission de toponymie du Québec.

== See also ==
- List of township municipalities in Quebec
