= Petite rivière aux Saumons =

Watercourse in Canada

Location
- Country: Canada
- Province: Quebec
- Region: Saguenay-Lac-Saint-Jean
- Regional County Municipality: Maria-Chapdelaine Regional County Municipality

Physical characteristics
- Source: Lake Anita
  - location: Rivière-Mistassini
  - coordinates: 48°58′22″N 72°53′45″W
  - elevation: 279 m (915 ft)
- Mouth: Ashuapmushuan River
  - location: Saint-Thomas-Didyme
  - coordinates: 48°52′24″N 72°52′08″W
  - elevation: 190 m (620 ft)
- Length: 13.1 km (8.1 mi)

Basin features
- Progression: Ashuapmushuan River, Lac Saint-Jean, Saguenay River, Saint Lawrence River
- Tributaries
  - left: (upstream) discharge of a small lake, discharge of lakes Orignal, Line and Pointes, discharge of Lake Marcel (via le Lac de la Petite Rivière aux Saumons).
  - right: (upstream) Lac Têtu discharge, lake discharge, discharge of lakes Roger and Chaloupe (via Lac de la Petite Rivière aux Saumons), stream (via lake Malfait).

The Petite rivière aux Saumons (English: Little Salmons River) is a tributary of the Ashuapmushuan River, flowing in the unorganized territory of Rivière-Mistassini and in the municipality of Saint-Thomas-Didyme, in the Maria-Chapdelaine Regional County Municipality, in the administrative region of Saguenay–Lac-Saint-Jean, in the province of Quebec, in Canada.

The valley of the Petite rivière aux Saumons is mainly served by forest roads.

Forestry is the main economic activity in this valley.

== Geography ==
The Petite rivière aux Saumons has its source at the mouth of the lake Anita (length: 0.34 km (0.21 mi); altitude: 279 m (915 ft)). This head lake has two emissaries: the other flows north to discharge towards Lac Chapeau which in turn flows into Petit lac à Jim.

The mouth of the lake Anita is located in a forest zone in the unorganized territory of Rivière-Mistassini, at:

- 4.6 km (2.9 mi) nord-est of the course of ruisseau Moncou which flows in parallel (west side) of the Petite rivière aux Saumons;
- 11.2 km (7.0 mi) north-west of the mouth of the Petite rivière aux Saumons;
- 48.9 km (30.4 mi) north-west of downtown Saint-Félicien.

From the mouth of the lake Anita, the Petite rivière aux Saumons flows over 13.1 km (8.1 mi), with a drop of 83 m (272 ft), entirely in a forest area, according to the following segments:

- 1.5 km (0.93 mi) towards the south relatively in a straight line, crossing Malfait lake (length: 1.0 km (0.62 mi); altitude: 276 m (906 ft)), up to at its mouth;
- 2.1 km (1.3 mi) to the south relatively in a straight line, crossing Lac de la Petite Rivière aux Saumons (length: 0.7 km (0.43 mi); altitude: 273 m (896 ft)), up to its mouth;
- 2.2 km (1.4 mi) first to the south in a straight line, up to the limit of the municipality of Saint-Thomas-Didyme;
- 7.3 km (4.5 mi) towards the south-east, entering the Ashuapmushuan Wildlife Reserve and collecting the discharge (coming from the north-west) of Perron lake, up to a bend in the river; then on 1.0 km (0.62 mi) towards the west, to its mouth.

The Petite rivière aux Saumons empties on the north bank of the Ashuapmushuan River at 4.0 km (2.5 mi) upstream from the confluence of the rivière à la Loutre. This confluence is located at:

- 16.0 km (9.9 mi) to the southwest of the center of the village of Saint-Thomas-Didyme;
- 40.8 km (25.4 mi) north-west of downtown Saint-Félicien;
- 51.5 km (32.0 mi) northwest of the mouth of the Ashuapmushuan River.

From the mouth of the Petite rivière aux Saumons, the current descends the course of the Ashuapmushuan river on 62.5 km (38.8 mi), then crosses lac Saint-Jean eastward on 41.1 km (25.5 mi) (i.e. its full length), follows the course of the Saguenay River via la Petite Décharge on 172.3 km (107.1 mi) eastward to at Tadoussac where it meets the estuary of Saint Lawrence.

== Toponymy ==
The toponyms "Petite rivière aux Saumons" and "Lac de la Petite Rivière aux Saumons" are interrelated.

The toponym "Petite rivière aux Saumons" was made official on September 29, 1975, at the Place Names Bank of the Commission de toponymie du Québec.

== See also ==
- Maria-Chapdelaine Regional County Municipality
- Rivière-Mistassini, an unorganized territory (Canada)
- Saint-Thomas-Didyme, a municipality
- Ashuapmushuan River
- Ashuapmushuan Wildlife Reserve
- List of rivers of Quebec
