= Rivière à la Loutre (Ashuapmushuan River tributary) =

Location
- Country: Canada
- Province: Quebec
- Region: Saguenay-Lac-Saint-Jean
- Regional County Municipality: Maria-Chapdelaine Regional County Municipality

Physical characteristics
- Source: Lac à la Truite
  - location: Rivière-Mistassini
  - coordinates: 48°58′22″N 72°48′43″W
  - elevation: 255 m (837 ft)
- Mouth: Ashuapmushuan River
  - location: Saint-Thomas-Didyme
  - coordinates: 48°52′47″N 72°49′33″W
  - elevation: 180 m (590 ft)
- Length: 10.5 km (6.5 mi)

Basin features
- Progression: Ashuapmushuan River, Lac Saint-Jean, Saguenay River, Saint Lawrence River
- Tributaries
  - left: (upstream) stream, discharge from Lac du Fly, discharge from a small lake, 3 streams.
  - right: (upstream) discharge from Lac de la Roche, discharge from Lac Équerre, discharge from Lake Albéric, discharge from Lac à la Loutre, stream.

The rivière à la Loutre is a tributary of the Ashuapmushuan River, flowing in the unorganized territory of Rivière-Mistassini and in the municipality of Saint-Thomas-Didyme, in the Maria-Chapdelaine Regional County Municipality, in the administrative region of Saguenay–Lac-Saint-Jean, in the province of Quebec, in Canada.

The valley of the Rivière à la Loutre is mainly served by forest roads including the R-0202 in the upper part.

Forestry is the main economic activity in this valley.

== Geography ==
Rivière à la Loutre has its source at the mouth of Lac à la Truite (length: 1.26 km (0.78 mi); altitude: 255 m (837 ft)) located in the unorganized territory of Rivière-Mistassini, just 0.24 km (0.15 mi) north-west of the limit of the municipality of Saint-Thomas-Didyme. This lake is fed by the discharge of a stream (coming from the northwest) and by the discharge (coming from the south) of a group of lakes including Lake Raymond and Lake Carré.

The mouth of Lac à la Truite is located in a forest zone in the Rivière-Mistassini territory, at:

- 5.1 km (3.2 mi) west of Lac à Jim;
- 13.5 km (8.4 mi) north-west of the center of the village of Saint-Thomas-Didyme;
- 11.1 km (6.9 mi) north of the mouth of Rivière à la Loutre;
- 47.9 km (29.8 mi) northwest of downtown Saint-Félicien.

From the mouth of Lac à la Truite, the Rivière à la Loutre flows over 10.5 km (6.5 mi), with a drop of 75 m (246 ft), entirely in forest area, depending on the segments following:

- 5.4 km (3.4 mi) first east for about 240 meters to a bend in the river corresponding to the discharge (coming from the north) of Lac du Trois Milles; then south, forming a few streamers, then crossing the fourchu lake (length: 1.6 km (0.99 mi) shaped like a hockey stick with the handle facing south; altitude: 242 m (794 ft)), up to its mouth. Note: Lake Fourchu receives the discharge from Lac à la Loutre on the northwest side;
- 3.5 km (2.2 mi) towards the south in a deep valley crossing at the end of the segment a lake (length: 0.3 km (0.19 mi) in the shape of a donut with an island in the center; altitude: 223 m (732 ft)), up to its mouth;
- 1.6 km (0.99 mi) towards the south-east, collecting the discharge (coming from the north) of a stream and entering the Ashuapmushuan Wildlife Reserve, up to its mouth.

Rivière à la Loutre flows into a bend in the river on the north bank of the Ashuapmushuan river at 4.0 km (2.5 mi) downstream from the confluence of the Petite rivière aux Saumons and upstream of the Rapide Pas background. The confluence of the Rivière à la Loutre is located at:

- 12.5 km (7.8 mi) to the southwest of the center of the village of Saint-Thomas-Didyme;
- 38.4 km (23.9 mi) north-west of downtown Saint-Félicien.

From the mouth of Rivière à la Loutre, the current descends the course of the Ashuapmushuan River on 58.5 km (36.4 mi), then crosses lac Saint-Jean eastward on 41.1 km (25.5 mi) (ie its full length), follows the course of the Saguenay River via la Petite Décharge on 172.3 km (107.1 mi) eastward to at Tadoussac where it meets the Estuary of Saint Lawrence.

== Toponymy ==
The toponym "rivière à la Loutre" was made official on December 5, 1968, at the Place Names Bank of the Commission de toponymie du Québec.

== See also ==
- List of rivers of Quebec
