= Denis Trottier =

Canadian politician and teacher

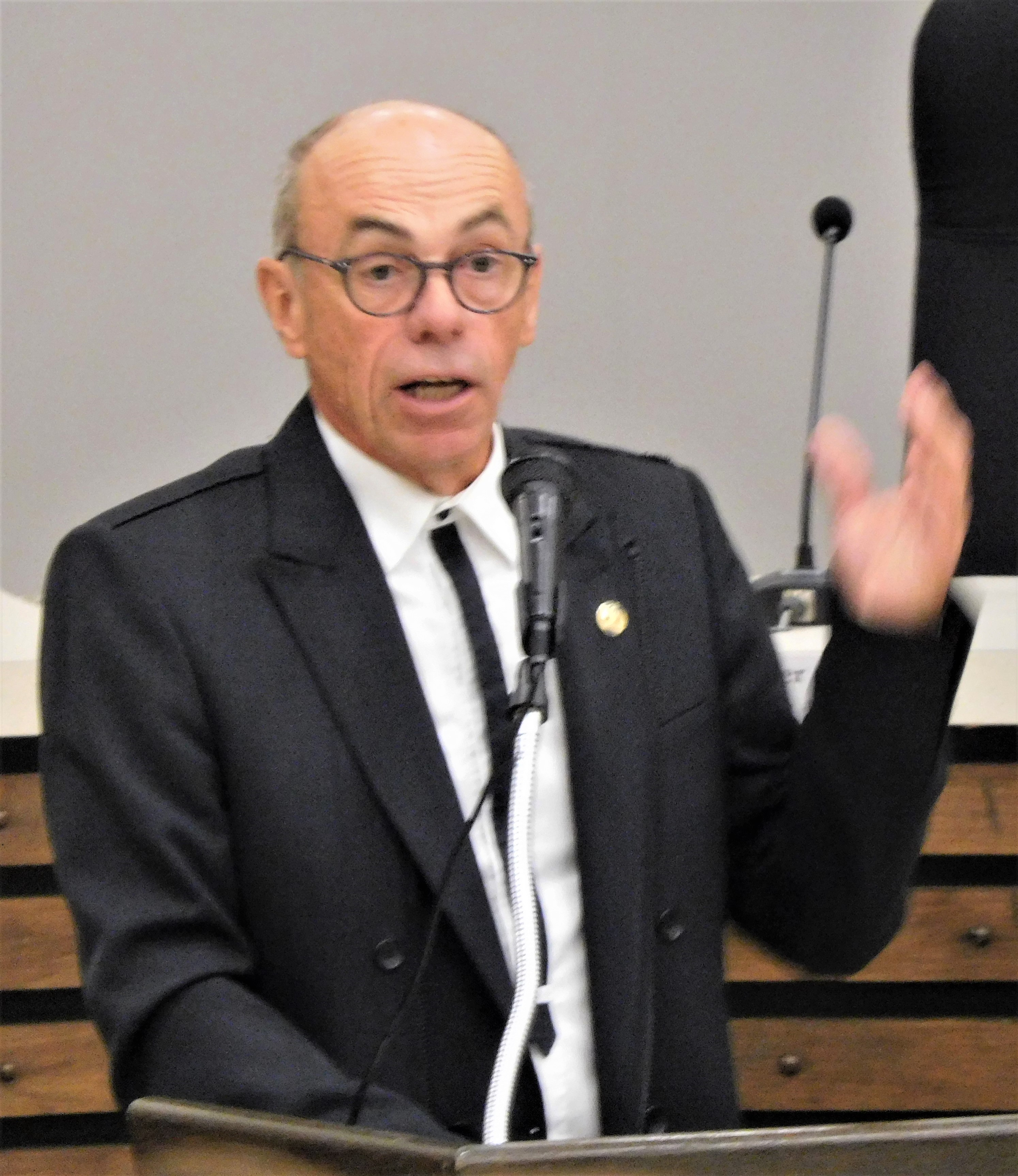

MNA for Roberval
- In office April 25, 2007 – 2014
- Preceded by: Karl Blackburn
- Succeeded by: Philippe Couillard

Personal details
- Born: June 8, 1952 (age 74) Dolbeau-Mistassini, Quebec
- Party: Parti Québécois
- Profession: teacher
- Portfolio: National politic for water

Denis Trottier (born June 8, 1952 in Dolbeau-Mistassini, Quebec) is a Quebec politician and teacher. He was previously a Member of National Assembly of Quebec for the riding of Roberval in the Saguenay-Lac-Saint-Jean region, losing to Premier Philippe Couillard in the 2014 general election. He represented the Parti Québécois.

Trottier went to Université Laval where he received a bachelor's degree in political science and a certificate in college education. He also did a master's degree in regional studies at the Université du Québec à Chicoutimi. Trottier was a lecturer at the UQAC in sociology for 23 years and a teacher at CEGEP de Saint-Félicien in political science and sociology for 18 years. He was also a member of the MRC Maria-Chapdelaine and the mayor of Péribonka from 2001 to 2005. He was also a member of the Fédération Québécoise des Municipalités.

Trottier was elected in the 2007 elections by defeating Liberal incumbent Karl Blackburn.
