= Mistassini (disambiguation) =

Mistassini is a former town, now part of the city of Dolbeau-Mistassini in the Canadian province of Quebec.

Mistassini may also refer to:

- Mistassini River
- Mistassini Lake

== See also ==
- Mistissini, a First Nations reserve
