= Damville =

Damville may refer to:

== Persons ==
- Charles de Montmorency-Damville (1537–1612), duke of Damville, admiral of France, peer of France
- Henri I de Montmorency-Damville (1534–1614), Marshal of France, Constable of France, seigneur of Damville, served as Governor of Languedoc from 1563 to 1614

== Places ==
=== Canada ===
- Damville Lake, a body of water in the unorganized territory of Rivière-Mistassini, Maria-Chapdelaine Regional County Municipality, Saguenay–Lac-Saint-Jean, in Quebec
- Damville (Quebec township), a township in the unorganized territory of Rivière-Mistassini, Quebec

=== France ===
- Buis-sur-Damville, a former commune in the department of Eure, Normandy
- Damville, Eure, a former commune in the department of Eure, Normandy

== See also ==
- Danville (disambiguation)
