= Rivière aux Brochets (Ashuapmushuan River tributary) =

Location
- Country: Canada
- Province: Quebec
- Region: Saguenay-Lac-Saint-Jean
- Regional County Municipality: Maria-Chapdelaine Regional County Municipality

Physical characteristics
- Source: Lac Stackler
  - location: Rivière-Mistassini
  - coordinates: 49°12′42″N 73°11′34″W
  - elevation: 386 m (1,266 ft)
- Mouth: Ashuapmushuan River
  - location: Rivière-Mistassini
  - coordinates: 47°09′08″N 73°08′33″W
  - elevation: 270 m (890 ft)
- Length: 11.2 km (7.0 mi)

Basin features
- Progression: Ashuapmushuan River, Lac Saint-Jean, Saguenay River, Saint Lawrence River
- Tributaries
  - left: (upstream) discharge from Damville lake, stream, discharge from 2nd Lac des Jumeaux
  - right: (upstream) stream.

The Rivière aux Brochets is a tributary of the Ashuapmushuan River, flowing in the unorganized territory of Rivière-Mistassini, in the Maria-Chapdelaine Regional County Municipality, in the administrative region of Saguenay–Lac-Saint-Jean, in province of Quebec, in Canada.

The southern part of the Brochets river valley is mainly served by the forest road R0202.

Forestry is the main economic activity in this valley.

== Geography ==
The Rivière aux Brochets has its source at the mouth of Stackler Lake (length: 4.7 km (2.9 mi); altitude: 386 m (1,266 ft)). Montagne Plate and Montagne des Bouleaux are located on the northwest side of Stackler Lake. This lake is fed by the discharge (coming from the west) of Lac Vidé and by the discharge (coming from the northwest) of a set of lakes including Chanceux, and Lac Denis.

The mouth of Stackler Lake is located in a forest zone in the unorganized territory of Rivière-Mistassini, at:

- 3.3 km (2.1 mi) northeast of a bend in the Ashuapmushuan River;
- 8.9 km (5.5 mi) north-west of Damville Lake;
- 83.1 km (51.6 mi) northwest of downtown Saint-Félicien.

From the mouth of Stackler Lake, the Rivière aux Brochets flows over 11.2 km (7.0 mi) with a drop of 116 m (381 ft), entirely in the forest zone, according to the following segments:

- 3.8 km (2.4 mi) first towards the northeast, down the mountain and collecting the discharge (coming from the north) of lac au Huard, to the north shore of Lac du Lance-Pierres; then to the south-east, crossing the latter lake (length: 1.7 km (1.1 mi); altitude: 335 m (1,099 ft)), to its mouth. Note: The northern part of this lake forms a Y; the central part receives from the west the discharge of Lake Judith; the southern part (triangular in shape) receives the discharge from the Twin Lakes on the northeast side, of which the northern lake in turn receives the discharge from Lac des Îles (from the northwest);
- 6.5 km (4.0 mi) towards the south-east, relatively in a straight line, crossing Lac au Sable and Lac des Ménés, and collecting a stream (coming from the north, i.e. the outlet of Lake Karina), to a bend in the river, corresponding to the discharge (coming from the east) of Damville Lake. Note: The last 1.7 km of this segment constitutes a widening of the river and is interconnected with Damville Lake;
- 0.87 km (0.54 mi) towards the south-west, passing under the forest road bridge R0202, then forming a hook towards the south to collect at the end of the segment a stream (coming from the north), until 'at its mouth.

The Brochets River flows into a bend in the river on the northeast bank of the Ashuapmushuan River. This confluence is located downstream of the Rapides du Fer à Cheval, and at:

- 46.5 km (28.9 mi) west of the center of the village of Girardville;
- 74.8 km (46.5 mi) north-west of downtown Saint-Félicien;
- 84.3 km (52.4 mi) northwest of the mouth of the Ashuapmushuan River.

From the mouth of the Rivière aux Brochets, the current descends the course of the Ashuapmushuan River on 100.4 km (62.4 mi), then crosses lac Saint-Jean eastward on 41.1 km (25.5 mi) (i.e. its full length), follows the course of the Saguenay River via la Petite Décharge on 172.3 km (107.1 mi) east to Tadoussac where it meets the estuary of Saint Lawrence.

== Toponymy ==
The toponym "rivière aux Brochets" was made official on September 29, 1975, at the Place Names Bank of the Commission de toponymie du Québec.

== See also ==
- List of rivers of Quebec
