= Danville micropolitan area =

Danville micropolitan area may refer to:

- Vermilion County, Illinois, comprises the Danville micropolitan area
- The Danville, Kentucky micropolitan area, United States
- The Danville, Virginia micropolitan area, United States

== See also ==
- Danville metropolitan area (disambiguation)
- Danville (disambiguation)
