= Saint-Stanislas, Quebec =

There are two municipalities called Saint-Stanislas in Quebec:

- Saint-Stanislas, Mauricie, Quebec in Les Chenaux Regional County Municipality
- Saint-Stanislas, Saguenay–Lac-Saint-Jean, Quebec in Maria-Chapdelaine Regional County Municipality

== See also ==
- Saint-Stanislas-de-Kostka, also in Quebec
