= Isabelle Thibeault =

Quebec politician

Isabelle Thibeault MNA

Member of the National Assembly for Roberval
- Incumbent
- Assumed office October 5, 2026
- Preceded by: Nancy Guillemette

Personal details
- Party: Parti Québécois

Isabelle Thibeault is a Canadian politician who is a candidate for the National Assembly of Quebec for Roberval in the 2026 Quebec general election as a member of the Parti Québécois.

Thibeault was a councillor in Albanel and the Vice President of the Saguenay–Lac-Saint-Jean chapter of the Alliance du personnel professionnel et technique de la santé et des services sociaux.

== Electoral record ==
2026 Quebec general election: Roberval
** Preliminary results — Not yet official **
Party	Candidate	Votes	%	±%
Parti Québécois	Isabelle Thibeault	10,168	36.53	
Conservative	Pierre Gagné	7,256	26.07	
Coalition Avenir Québec	Yanick Baillargeon	5,202	18.69	
Liberal	Serge Bergeon	3,736	13.42	
Québec solidaire	Guillaume David	1,473	5.29	
Total valid votes				
Total rejected ballots				
Turnout			63.39	
Electors on the lists			–	–
Parti Québécois gain from Coalition Avenir Québec		Swing		+
Source: Élections Québec
