= Saint-Edmond, Quebec =

Saint-Edmond, Quebec may refer to:

- Saint-Edmond, Bas-Saint-Laurent, Quebec, which amalgamated into Lac-au-Saumon, Quebec in 1997.
- Saint-Edmond-les-Plaines, Quebec, known simply as Saint-Edmond until 2004.
- Saint-Edmond-de-Grantham, Quebec
