= Roberval (provincial electoral district) =

Provincial electoral district in Quebec, Canada

Coordinates: 50.3°N 74.0°W

Quebec electoral district

Provincial electoral district
- Legislature: National Assembly of Quebec
MNA
Isabelle Thibeault
Parti Québécois
- District created: 1930
- First contested: 1931
- Last contested: 2026

Demographics
- Population (2011): 57,080
- Electors (2018): 44,511
- Area (km²): 40,930.6
- Pop. density (per km²): 1.4
- Census division(s): Le Domaine-du-Roy, Maria Chapdelaine
- Census subdivision(s): Albanel, Chambord, Dolbeau-Mistassini, Girardville, La Doré, Lac-Bouchette, Normandin, Notre-Dame-de-Lorette, Péribonka, Roberval, Saint-André-du-Lac-Saint-Jean, Saint-Augustin, Saint-Edmond-les-Plaines, Saint-Eugène-d'Argentenay, Saint-Félicien, Saint-François-de-Sales, Sainte-Hedwidge, Sainte-Jeanne-d'Arc, Saint-Prime, Saint-Stanislas, Saint-Thomas-Didyme; Mashteuiatsh; Lac-Ashuapmushuan, Rivière-Mistassini, Sainte-Élisabeth-de-Proulx, Passes-Dangereuses (part)

Roberval (French pronunciation: [ʁɔbɛʁval]) is a provincial electoral district in the Saguenay–Lac-Saint-Jean region of Quebec, Canada, which elects a member to the National Assembly of Quebec. It notably includes the municipalities of Dolbeau-Mistassini, Saint-Félicien, Roberval, Normandin, Saint-Prime, and Albanel.

It was created for the 1931 election from parts of the Lac-Saint-Jean provincial electoral district.

In the change from the 2001 to the 2011 electoral map, it gained Saint-André-du-Lac-Saint-Jean and part of the unorganized territory of Passes-Dangereuses from Lac-Saint-Jean electoral district.

The district is named after the 16th-century French explorer Jean-François de la Roque de Roberval.

== Members of the Legislative Assembly / National Assembly ==
Legislature	Years	Member	Party
Riding created from Lac-Saint-Jean
18th	1931–1935	Émile Moreau	Liberal
19th	1935–1936	Antoine Castonguay	Action libérale nationale
20th	1936–1939	Antoine Castonguay	Union Nationale
21st	1939–1944	Georges Potvin	Liberal
22nd	1944–1948	Antoine Marcotte	Union Nationale
23rd	1948–1952	Antoine Marcotte	Union Nationale
24th	1952–1955	Antoine Marcotte	Union Nationale
25th	1956–1958	Paul-Henri Spence	Union Nationale
25th	1958–1960	Jean-Joseph Turcotte	Union Nationale
26th	1960–1962	Jean-Claude Plourde	Liberal
27th	1962–1966	Joseph-Georges Gauthier	Union Nationale
28th	1966–1970	Joseph-Georges Gauthier	Union Nationale
29th	1970–1973	Robert Lamontagne	Liberal
30th	1973–1976	Robert Lamontagne	Liberal
31st	1976–1981	Robert Lamontagne	Liberal
32nd	1981–1985	Michel Gauthier	Parti Québécois
33rd	1985–1988	Michel Gauthier	Parti Québécois
33rd	1988–1989	Gaston Blackburn	Liberal
34th	1989–1994	Gaston Blackburn	Liberal
35th	1994–1998	Benoît Laprise	Parti Québécois
36th	1998–2003	Benoît Laprise	Parti Québécois
37th	2003–2007	Karl Blackburn	Liberal
38th	2007–2008	Denis Trottier	Parti Québécois
39th	2008–2012	Denis Trottier	Parti Québécois
40th	2012–2014	Denis Trottier	Parti Québécois
41st	2014–2018	Philippe Couillard	Liberal
42nd	2018–2018	Philippe Couillard	Liberal
42nd	2018–2022	Nancy Guillemette	Coalition Avenir Québec
43rd	2022–2026	Nancy Guillemette	Coalition Avenir Québec
44th	2026–Present	Isabelle Thibeault	Parti Québécois

== Election results ==
2026 Quebec general election
** Preliminary results — Not yet official **
Party	Candidate	Votes	%	±%
Parti Québécois	Isabelle Thibeault	10,168	36.53	
Conservative	Pierre Gagné	7,256	26.07	
Coalition Avenir Québec	Yanick Baillargeon	5,202	18.69	
Liberal	Serge Bergeon	3,736	13.42	
Québec solidaire	Guillaume David	1,473	5.29	
Total valid votes				
Total rejected ballots				
Turnout			63.39	
Electors on the lists			–	–
Parti Québécois gain from Coalition Avenir Québec		Swing		+
Source: Élections Québec

2022 Quebec general election
Party	Candidate	Votes	%	±%
Coalition Avenir Québec	Nancy Guillemette	15,017	56.19	+1.66
Parti Québécois	Patrice Bouchard	5,488	20.53	+3.02
Conservative	Samuel Gaudreault	3,038	11.37	+10.24
Québec solidaire	Michaël Ottereyes	1,826	6.83	–3.49
Liberal	Maxim Lavoie	1,217	4.55	–10.66
Climat Québec	Lynda Lalancette	141	0.53	New
Total valid votes		26,727	98.77	
Total rejected ballots		334	1.23	+0.68
Turnout		27,061	60.78	+26.11
Electors on the lists		44,525		
Coalition Avenir Québec hold		Swing		–0.68
Source: Élections Québec

Quebec provincial by-election, December 10, 2018 Resignation of Philippe Couillard
Party	Candidate	Votes	%	±%
Coalition Avenir Québec	Nancy Guillemette	8,369	54.53	+30.37
Parti Québécois	Thomas Gaudreault	2,688	17.51	-1.51
Liberal	William Laroche	2,334	15.21	-27.25
Québec solidaire	Luc-Antoine Cauchon	1,584	10.32	-0.38
Conservative	Carl C. Lamontagne	172	1.13	-0.60
Citoyens au pouvoir	Julie Boucher	121	0.79	-0.31
Green	Alex Tyrrell	80	0.52	–
Total valid votes		15,384	99.45	
Total rejected ballots		85	0.55	-0.89
Turnout		15,433	34.67	-28.72
Electors on the list		44,509		
Coalition Avenir Québec gain from Liberal		Swing		+28.81

2018 Quebec general election
Party	Candidate	Votes	%	±%
Liberal	Philippe Couillard	11,807	42.46	-12.72
Coalition Avenir Québec	Denise Trudel	6,719	24.16	+17.23
Parti Québécois	Thomas Gaudreault	5,290	19.02	-14.31
Québec solidaire	Luc-Antoine Cauchon	2,975	10.70	+7.55
Conservative	Carl Lamontagne	478	1.72	
Citoyens au pouvoir	Julie Boucher	305	1.10	+0.36
Parti nul	Lynda Lalancette	236	0.85	
Total valid votes		27,810	98.56	
Total rejected ballots		407	1.44	
Turnout		28,217	63.39	
Eligible voters		44,511		
Liberal hold		Swing		-14.98
Source(s) "Rapport des résultats officiels du scrutin". Élections Québec.

2014 Quebec general election
Party	Candidate	Votes	%	±%
Liberal	Philippe Couillard	17,816	55.17	+26.79
Parti Québécois	Denis Trottier	10,764	33.33	-13.37
Coalition Avenir Québec	François Truchon	2,239	6.93	-12.45
Québec solidaire	Guillaume Néron	1,018	3.15	-0.88
Parti des sans Parti	Julie Boucher	237	0.73	–
Option nationale	Luc-Antoine Cauchon	218	0.68	-0.84
Total valid votes		32,292	98.95	–
Total rejected ballots		342	1.05	-0.20
Turnout		32,634	72.29	-0.30
Electors on the lists		45,143	–	–
Liberal gain from Parti Québécois		Swing		+20.08

2012 Quebec general election
Party	Candidate	Votes	%	±%
Parti Québécois	Denis Trottier	15,069	46.70	+0.28
Liberal	Georges Simard	9,157	28.38	-11.27
Coalition Avenir Québec	Alain Hamel	6,252	19.38	+9.63*
Québec solidaire	Olivier Bouchard-Lamontagne	1,302	4.03	+1.96
Option nationale	Catherine Douesnard	488	1.51	–
Total valid votes		32,268	98.75	–
Total rejected ballots		407	1.25	+0.23
Turnout		32,675	72.59	+11.96
Electors on the lists		45,012	–	–
Parti Québécois hold		Swing		+5.78

* Result compared to Action démocratique

2008 Quebec general election
Party	Candidate	Votes	%	±%
Parti Québécois	Denis Trottier	12,522	46.42	+4.67
Liberal	Georges Simard	10,697	39.65	+5.21
Action démocratique	Jacques Cadieux	2,630	9.75	-10.77
Durable	Sébastien Girard	567	2.10	–
Québec solidaire	Nicole Schmitt	561	2.08	-1.21
Total valid votes		26,977	98.98	–
Total rejected ballots		278	1.02	+0.10
Turnout		27,255	60.63	-12.07
Electors on the lists		44,952	–	–
Parti Québécois hold		Swing		-0.27

2007 Quebec general election
Party	Candidate	Votes	%	±%
Parti Québécois	Denis Trottier	13,506	41.75	+3.38
Liberal	Karl Blackburn	11,141	34.44	-4.73
Action démocratique	Mario-Michel Jomphe	6,638	20.52	-0.45
Québec solidaire	Nicole Schmitt	1,065	3.29	+1.80*
Total valid votes		32,350	99.08	–
Total rejected ballots		302	0.92	-0.09
Turnout		32,652	72.70	+4.25
Electors on the lists		44,913	–	–
Parti Québécois gain from Liberal		Swing		+4.06

* Result compared to UFP

2003 Quebec general election
Party	Candidate	Votes	%	±%
Liberal	Karl Blackburn	11,930	39.17	+14.38
Parti Québécois	Réjean Lalancette	11,686	38.37	-21.58
Action démocratique	Bernard Généreux	6,388	20.97	+6.63
UFP	Francis Breton	453	1.49	+0.57*
Total valid votes		30,457	98.98	–
Total rejected ballots		313	1.02	-0.03
Turnout		30,770	68.45	-4.67
Electors on the lists		44,954	–	–
Liberal gain from Parti Québécois		Swing		+17.98

* Result compared to PDS

1998 Quebec general election
Party	Candidate	Votes	%	±%
Parti Québécois	Benoît Laprise	19,288	59.95	-0.13
Liberal	Pierre Thibeault	7,978	24.79	-12.10
Action démocratique	François Gendron	4,616	14.35	–
Socialist Democracy	Pieter Wentholt	294	0.91	–
Total valid votes		32,176	98.95	–
Total rejected ballots		340	1.05	-0.71
Turnout		32,516	73.12	-2.04
Electors on the lists		44,472	–	–
Parti Québécois hold		Swing		+5.98

1995 Quebec referendum
Side	Votes	%
Oui	25,194	65.21
Non	13,441	34.79

1994 Quebec general election
Party	Candidate	Votes	%	±%
Parti Québécois	Benoît Laprise	18,281	60.08	+15.71
Liberal	Jean-Marc Gendron	11,226	36.89	-16.42
Natural Law	Normand Dufour	923	3.03	–
Total valid votes		30,430	98.24	–
Total rejected ballots		544	1.76	-0.13
Turnout		30,974	75.15	+3.20
Electors on the lists		41,215	–	–
Parti Québécois gain from Liberal		Swing		+16.07

1992 Charlottetown Accord referendum
Side	Votes	%
Non	21,162	66.42
Oui	10,697	33.58

1989 Quebec general election
Party	Candidate	Votes	%	±%
Liberal	Gaston Blackburn	14,931	53.31	-8.70
Parti Québécois	Bernard Généreux	12,424	44.36	+8.44
Socialist Movement	Rachel Grenon	651	2.32	–
Total valid votes		28,006	98.12	–
Total rejected ballots		538	1.88	+1.02
Turnout		28,544	71.95	+7.07
Electors on the lists		39,671	–	–
Liberal hold		Swing		-8.57

Quebec provincial by-election, June 20, 1988
Party	Candidate	Votes	%	±%
Liberal	Gaston Blackburn	16,152	62.02	+15.80
Parti Québécois	Bernard Généreux	9,356	35.92	-16.71
Parti indépendantiste	Stéphane Duchesne	313	1.20	–
La Belle Province de Québec	Alexandre Roy	224	0.86	–
Total valid votes		26,045	99.14	–
Total rejected ballots		227	0.86	-0.43
Turnout		26,272	64.89	-12.26
Electors on the lists		40,490	–	–
Liberal gain from Parti Québécois		Swing		+16.26

1985 Quebec general election
Party	Candidate	Votes	%	±%
Parti Québécois	Michel Gauthier	16,684	52.64	-5.22
Liberal	Patrice Laroche	14,649	46.22	+7.97
Christian Socialist	Gilles Boivin	364	1.15	–
Total valid votes		31,697	98.71	–
Total rejected ballots		415	1.29	+0.42
Turnout		32,112	77.87	-5.72
Electors on the lists		41,240	–	–
Parti Québécois hold		Swing		-5.22

1981 Quebec general election
Party	Candidate	Votes	%	±%
Parti Québécois	Michel Gauthier	19,301	57.85	+21.33
Liberal	Robert Lamontagne	12,760	38.25	-1.42
Union Nationale	Irène Gagnon	1,302	3.90	-6.68
Total valid votes		33,363	99.13	–
Total rejected ballots		293	0.87	-0.83
Turnout		33,656	83.58	+2.68
Electors on the lists		40,267	–	–
Parti Québécois gain from Liberal		Swing		+11.37

1980 Quebec referendum
Side	Votes	%
Oui	16,088	50.65
Non	15,672	49.35

1976 Quebec general election
Party	Candidate	Votes	%	±%
Liberal	Robert Lamontagne	11,767	39.67	-13.39
Parti Québécois	Paul Néron	10,835	36.53	+13.06
Ralliement créditiste	Émilien Fradet	3,923	13.22	-4.89
Union Nationale	Antonio Genest	3,139	10.58	+5.22
Total valid votes		29,664	98.30	–
Total rejected ballots		513	1.70	+0.34
Turnout		30,177	80.90	+1.32
Electors on the lists		37,302	–	–
Liberal hold		Swing		-13.22

1973 Quebec general election
Party	Candidate	Votes	%	±%
Liberal	Robert Lamontagne	13,737	53.06	+15.21
Parti Québécois	Alain Bouchard	6,076	23.47	+0.49
Ralliement créditiste	Camille Lupien	4,689	18.11	+6.75
Union Nationale	François-Paul Boivin	1,388	5.36	-22.45
Total valid votes		25,890	98.64	
Total rejected ballots		357	1.36	
Turnout		26,247	79.58	
Electors on the lists		32,983	–	
Liberal hold		Swing		+7.36

1970 Quebec general election
Party	Candidate	Votes	%
Liberal	Robert Lamontagne	9,845	37.85
Union Nationale	Joseph-Georges Gauthier	7,236	27.82
Parti Québécois	Gilles Simard	5,977	22.98
Ralliement créditiste	Marcel Vézina	2,956	11.36
Total valid votes		26,014	98.76
Total rejected ballots		327	1.24
Turnout		26,341	84.64
Electors on the lists		31,122	–

1966 Quebec general election
Party	Candidate	Votes	%
Union Nationale	Joseph-Georges Gauthier	11,799	48.35
Liberal	Henri-Paul Brassard	10,253	42.02
Ralliement national	Claude Munger	2,077	8.51
Independent	J.-Armand Bilodeau	273	1.12
Total valid votes		24,402	98.43
Total rejected ballots		390	1.57
Turnout		24,792	82.92
Electors on the lists		29,899	–

1962 Quebec general election
Party	Candidate	Votes	%
Union Nationale	Joseph-Georges Gauthier	11,172	51.23
Liberal	Jean-Claude Plourde	10,635	48.77
Total valid votes		21,807	99.11
Total rejected ballots		195	0.89
Turnout		22,002	85.07
Electors on the lists		25,864	–

1960 Quebec general election
Party	Candidate	Votes	%
Liberal	Jean-Claude Plourde	12,761	58.50
Union Nationale	Jean-Joseph Turcotte	8,790	40.30
Independent UN	Georges-Henri Boucher	261	1.20
Total valid votes		21,812	99.38
Total rejected ballots		135	0.62
Turnout		21,947	87.78
Electors on the lists		25,002	–

Quebec provincial by-election, 1958
Party	Candidate	Votes	%
Union Nationale	Jean-Joseph Turcotte	10,487	58.19
Independent UN	J.-Augustin Fortin	7,535	41.81
Total valid votes		18,022	99.17
Total rejected ballots		151	0.83
Turnout		18,173	75.21
Electors on the lists		24,162	–

1956 Quebec general election
Party	Candidate	Votes	%
Union Nationale	Paul-Henri Spence	10,903	52.50
Liberal	Alphée Lessard	9,865	47.50
Total valid votes		20,768	99.15
Total rejected ballots		178	0.85
Turnout		20,946	88.94
Electors on the lists		23,551	–

1952 Quebec general election
Party	Candidate	Votes	%
Union Nationale	Antoine Marcotte	11,478	59.24
Liberal	Émile Vincent	7,899	40.76
Total valid votes		19,377	98.86
Total rejected ballots		223	1.14
Turnout		19,600	87.64
Electors on the lists		22,365	–

1948 Quebec general election
Party	Candidate	Votes	%
Union Nationale	Antoine Marcotte	9,695	55.02
Liberal	Joseph-Antoine Fortin	5,913	33.56
Union des électeurs	Xavier Dallaire	2,013	11.42
Total valid votes		17,621	99.40
Total rejected ballots		106	0.60
Turnout		17,727	89.83
Electors on the lists		19,735	–

1944 Quebec general election
Party	Candidate	Votes	%
Union Nationale	Antoine Marcotte	6,071	42.86
Liberal	Georges Potvin	5,363	37.86
Bloc populaire	Hubert Villeneuve	1,509	10.65
Union des électeurs	Gabriel Lacasse	1,222	8.63
Total valid votes		14,165	99.33
Total rejected ballots		95	0.67
Turnout		14,260	85.57
Electors on the lists		16,665	–

1939 Quebec general election
Party	Candidate	Votes	%
Liberal	Georges Potvin	3,424	50.69
Union Nationale	Antoine Castonguay	2,835	41.97
Action libérale nationale	Armand Tremblay	496	7.34
Total valid votes		6,755	99.18
Total rejected ballots		56	0.82
Turnout		6,811	82.75
Electors on the lists		8,231	–

1936 Quebec general election
Party	Candidate	Votes	%
Union Nationale	Antoine Castonguay	4,191	61.69
Liberal	Léonce Lévesque	2,603	38.31
Total valid votes		6,794	99.77
Total rejected ballots		16	0.23
Turnout		6,810	86.47
Electors on the lists		7,876	–

1935 Quebec general election
Party	Candidate	Votes	%
Action libérale nationale	Antoine Castonguay	3,768	60.56
Liberal	Louis-Gonzague Potvin	2,157	34.67
Independent Liberal	Joseph-Édouard-Nathanaël Boivin	297	4.77
Total valid votes		6,222	99.73
Total rejected ballots		17	0.27
Turnout		6,239	81.59
Electors on the lists		7,647	–

1931 Quebec general election
Party	Candidate	Votes	%
Liberal	Émile Moreau	2,732	52.89
Conservative	Joseph-Sylvio-Narcisse Turcotte	2,433	47.11
Total valid votes		5,165	99.04
Total rejected ballots		50	0.96
Turnout		5,215	88.00
Electors on the lists		5,926	–

== See also ==
- List of Quebec provincial electoral districts
- Canadian provincial electoral districts
