= Sainte-Élisabeth-de-Proulx =

- Unorganized territory
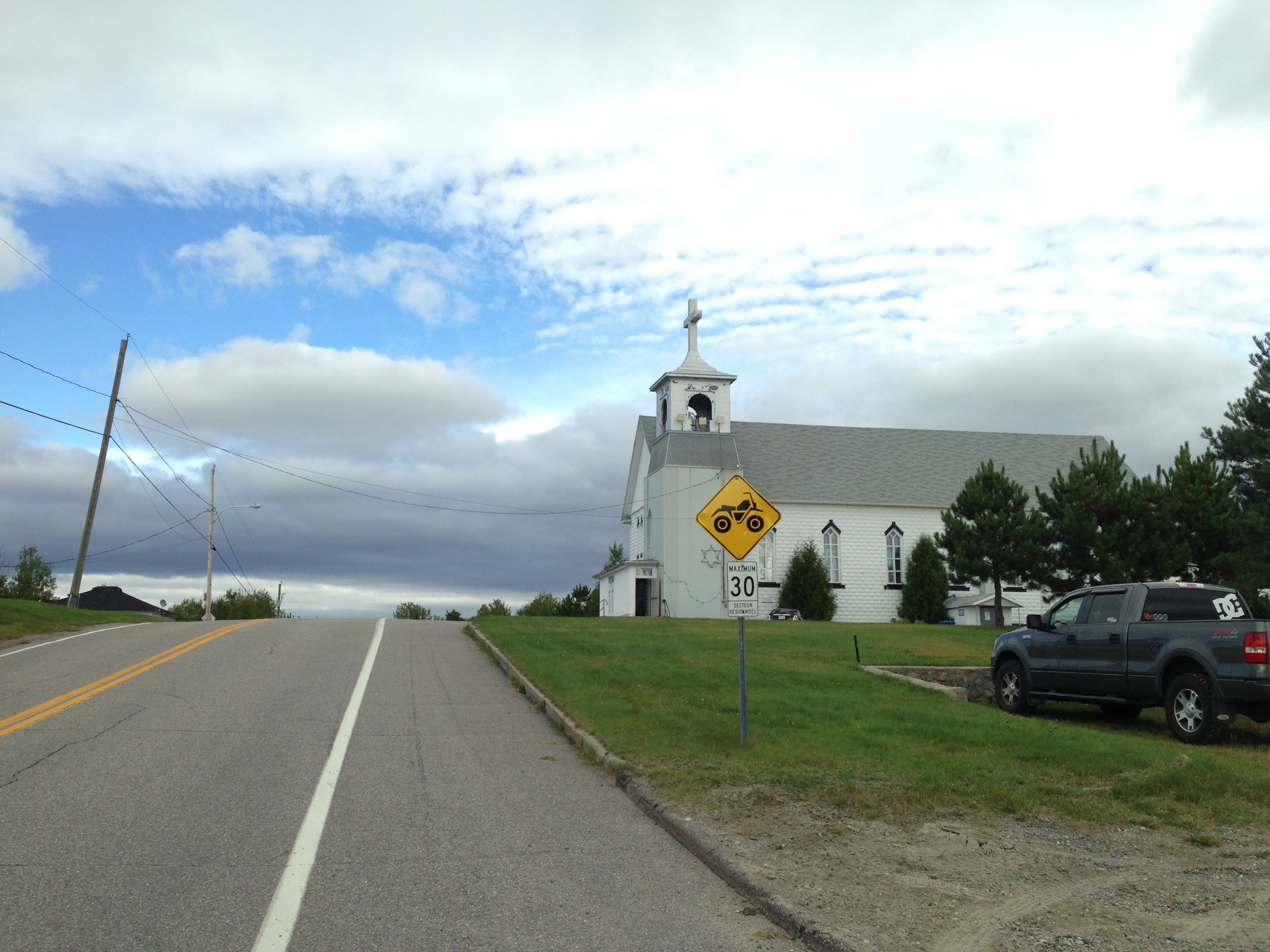
- Church of Sainte-Élisabeth-de-Proulx

- Location in Saguenay–Lac-Saint-Jean Quebec
- Coordinates: 48°57′N 72°04′W
- Country: Canada
- Province: Quebec
- Region: Saguenay–Lac-Saint-Jean
- RCM: Maria-Chapdelaine
- Constituted: October 7, 2024

Government
  - Federal riding: Jonquière
  - Prov. riding: Roberval
- Time zone: UTC−05:00 (EST)
  - Summer (DST): UTC−04:00 (EDT)
- Area codes: 418 and 581

Sainte-Élisabeth-de-Proulx (French pronunciation: [sɛ̃t elizabɛt də pʁu]) is an unorganized territory in the Canadian province of Quebec, located between the Peribonka River on the east and the Mistassibi River on the west created in 2024 by splitting from Passes-Dangereuses.
