= Albanel, Quebec =

Albanel
- Municipality
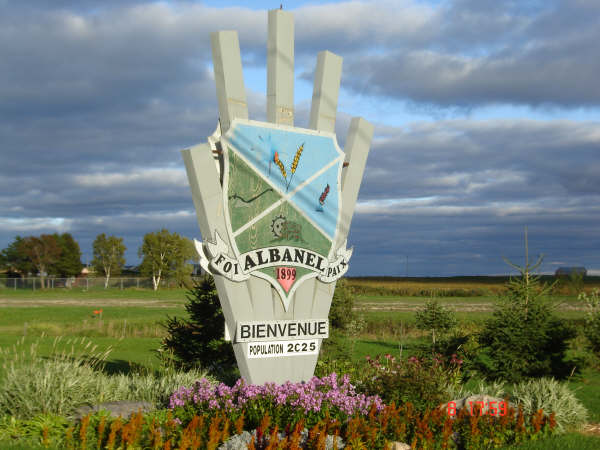
- Entrance of Albanel

- Location in Saguenay–Lac-Saint-Jean Quebec.
- Coordinates: 48°53′N 72°27′W
- Country: Canada
- Province: Quebec
- Region: Saguenay–Lac-Saint-Jean
- RCM: Maria-Chapdelaine
- Settled: 1880s
- Constituted: 11 April 1990

Government
  - Mayor: Dave Plourde
  - Federal riding: Lac-Saint-Jean
  - Prov. riding: Roberval

Area
  - Total: 205.00 km^{2} (79.15 sq mi)
  - Land: 197.45 km^{2} (76.24 sq mi)

Population (2021)
  - Total: 2,181
  - Density: 11/km^{2} (28/sq mi)
  - Pop (2016–21): ▼3.6%
  - Dwellings: 987
- Time zone: UTC−5 (EST)
  - Summer (DST): UTC−4 (EDT)
- Postal code(s): G8M
- Area codes: 418 and 581
- Climate: Dfb
- Website: www.albanel.ca

Albanel (French pronunciation: [albanɛl]) is a municipality in the Canadian province of Quebec, located within the regional county municipality of Maria-Chapdelaine. The municipality had a population of 2,181 as of the Canada 2021 Census.

== History ==
The geographic township of Albanel was proclaimed in 1883, named after Jesuit missionary and explorer Charles Albanel (c. 1616–1696). It had excellent land for farming, among the finest in the Lac Saint-Jean region at the time. Circa 1891, a mission was established in the township, served by pastors from Saint-Méthode and Normandin. In 1892, the Albanel post office opened. In 1899, the township was incorporated as the Township Municipality of Albanel.

The presence of adequate hydraulic power, in particular the Chute aux Français on the Mistassini River, and several dairies had contributed to modest, but significant, economic growth of the village of Albanel. In 1930, it separated from the township and formed the Village Municipality of Albanel.

In April 1990, the township and village municipalities of Albanel were merged again to form the Municipality of Albanel.

== Geography ==
=== Climate ===
Climate data for Albanel
Month	Jan	Feb	Mar	Apr	May	Jun	Jul	Aug	Sep	Oct	Nov	Dec	Year
Record high °C (°F)	9.4 (48.9)	7.8 (46.0)	16.5 (61.7)	28 (82)	32.8 (91.0)	35.6 (96.1)	35.6 (96.1)	36.1 (97.0)	32.8 (91.0)	28.3 (82.9)	19.4 (66.9)	10.4 (50.7)	36.1 (97.0)
Mean daily maximum °C (°F)	−11.8 (10.8)	−9 (16)	−2 (28)	6.9 (44.4)	16.2 (61.2)	21.6 (70.9)	24.1 (75.4)	22.4 (72.3)	16.3 (61.3)	8.8 (47.8)	0.6 (33.1)	−8.7 (16.3)	7.1 (44.8)
Mean daily minimum °C (°F)	−22.8 (−9.0)	−20.5 (−4.9)	−13.6 (7.5)	−3.5 (25.7)	3.7 (38.7)	8.9 (48.0)	11.7 (53.1)	10.5 (50.9)	5.5 (41.9)	0.2 (32.4)	−6.8 (19.8)	−18.6 (−1.5)	−3.8 (25.2)
Record low °C (°F)	−45 (−49)	−43.3 (−45.9)	−37.2 (−35.0)	−25.6 (−14.1)	−11.7 (10.9)	−5.5 (22.1)	1.1 (34.0)	−1.1 (30.0)	−6.7 (19.9)	−13.3 (8.1)	−30 (−22)	−43.3 (−45.9)	−45 (−49)
Average precipitation mm (inches)	61.7 (2.43)	47 (1.9)	51.5 (2.03)	59.8 (2.35)	87.5 (3.44)	80.9 (3.19)	108.6 (4.28)	96.9 (3.81)	89.9 (3.54)	67.5 (2.66)	63.3 (2.49)	72.4 (2.85)	886.7 (34.91)
Source: Environment Canada

== Demographics ==
Population trend:

- Population in 2021: 2,181 (2016 to 2021 population change: -3.6%)
- Population in 2016: 2,262
- Population in 2011: 2,293
- Population in 2006: 2,326
- Population in 2001: 2,455
- Population in 1996: 2,540
- Population in 1991: 2,496

Private dwellings occupied by usual residents: 935 (total dwellings: 987)

Mother tongue:

- English as first language: 0%
- French as first language: 99.5%
- English and French as first language: 0%
- Other as first language: 0%

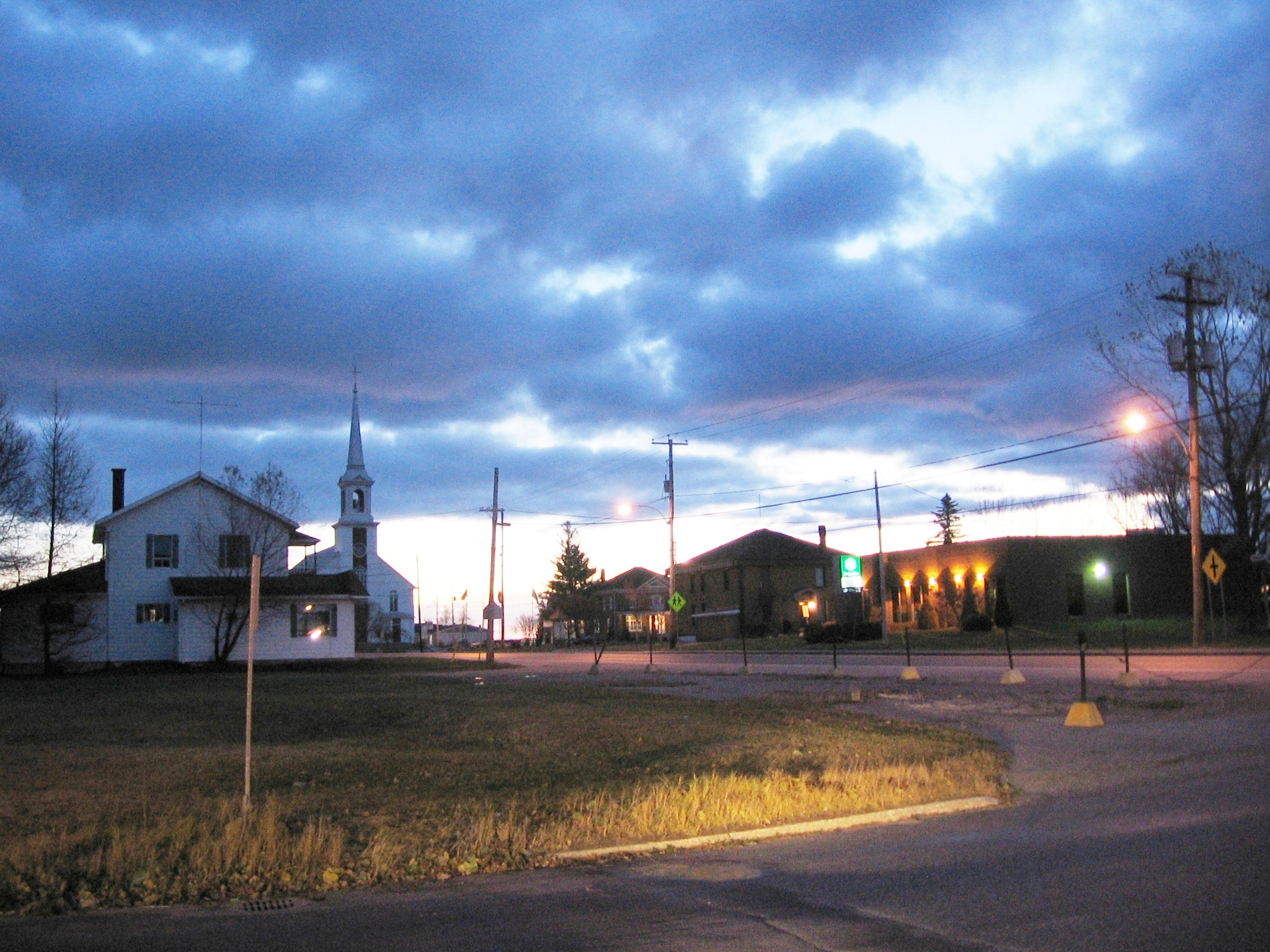
Albanel at dawn

== Government ==
List of mayors

From	To	Name	Party	Position
1990	1993	Jeannine Théberge		
1993	1997	Ghislain St-Pierre		
1997	2001	Lisa Guay		
2001	2005	Bernard Baril		
2005		Évangéline Plourde		
