= Pierre Mailloux =

Canadian psychiatrist (1949–2024)

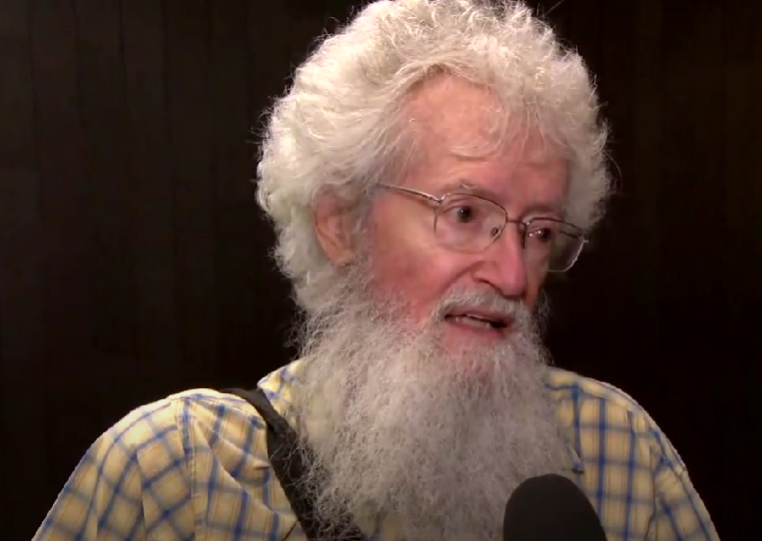
- Mailloux in 2023
- Born: January 14, 1949; Normandin, Quebec, Canada
- Died: January 12, 2024 (aged 74); Trois-Rivières, Quebec, Canada
- Education: Université Laval; McGill University
- Occupations: Psychiatrist; Psychoanalyst; Radio host; Hobby farmer

Pierre Mailloux (French: [pjɛʁ maju]; January 14, 1949 – January 12, 2024), better known as Doc Mailloux or Docteur Mailloux, was a Canadian psychiatrist and controversial radio show host.

== Background ==
Born in Normandin in the Saguenay-Lac-Saint-Jean region of Quebec. He studied medicine at Université Laval, in Quebec City, and psychiatry at McGill University, in Montreal.

In 1975, after serving as a psychiatrist for the Canadian Forces, he started working with assault offenders and participated in numerous trials as an expert witness in the psychiatric domain.

Mailloux was assigned to the Denis Lortie case. According to Mailloux, Lortie had paranoid schizophrenia and had organized his crime during a psychotic episode, believing he was acting on instructions from God. Nevertheless, in 1985, Lortie was convicted of first-degree murder, but a new trial was ordered due to legal errors. Lortie pleaded guilty to reduced charges of second-degree murder in 1987.

Mailloux latterly practised in and around the Trois-Rivières area.

On January 12, 2024, Mailloux died in Trois-Rivières, by assisted suicide, following unspecified complications from a renal infection at the age of 74.

== Radio career ==
In 1995, he started his radio career with CKAC, a Montreal based radio station, with his co-host Janine Ross. Over the years, the title of his radio show on Radiomédia network changed from Un psy à l'écoute to Deux psy à l'écoute to Doc Mailloux. However, in 2007, CKAC became a sports station and the program was cancelled.

Mailloux went on to appear on the radio station Radio X, based in Quebec City.

Mailloux later hosted Doc Mailloux et Josey on Patreon as well as appearing as a commentator on CJMF-FM based in Quebec City.

Mailloux was the author of several books, including Pour la castration volontaire des pédophiles (2001, ISBN 2-89005-761-5), Au secours des femmes (2001, ISBN 2-7640-0552-0), Pour l'amour des enfants : Non aux châtiments corporels! (2002, ISBN 2-922572-98-6), and Pour élever ses enfants : Prière de ne pas les rabaisser... (2006, ISBN 2-89562-107-1).

== Controversies ==
Mailloux was notorious for his controversial on-air comments and in 2002 was officially reprimanded by the Collège des médecins for making a diagnosis on the air, comments considered "unworthy of a doctor" and inaccurate information he gave about a drug.

Other topics he often spoke about included voluntary castration of pedophiles, violence toward children, incest, and he often criticized feminists.

Mailloux served as an on-air psychiatrist for the Quebec version of the reality show Loft Story, where he made remarks that upset the parents of a participant while analyzing her behaviour.

On February 10, 2005, the Quebec Regional Panel of the Canadian Broadcast Standards Council, answering a listener's complaint, determined that Mailloux had made "specifically-focused abusive and unduly discriminatory remarks" toward ethnic groups when talking about immigration in a broadcast. He referred to Sikhs as a "gang of bozos" (translated). They ruled that, in doing so, Mailloux and the station had broken the human rights clause of the Canadian Association of Broadcasters Code of Ethics.

On June 23, 2005, the Canadian Radio-television and Telecommunications Commission released a similar ruling on two other comments, including a statement that "Native Americans and Black people from the Americas are born less intelligent than White people" because of artificial selection from slavery and the Europeans who used to kill the smartest "Indians" to better control the population. He said that it accounts for their poverty and high unemployment rate. He also stated that "Janet Jackson exhibits tribal behaviour".

On September 25, 2005, he appeared on the widely viewed Québec television talk show, Tout le monde en parle and cited unspecified studies allegedly used at the Université de Montréal in psycho-education classes, stating that Black people in the Americas and Native Americans have a lower IQ average than white and Asian Americans, a currently controversial topic of study about race and intelligence.

Mailloux was indefinitely barred from the Collège des médecins in January 2007 for prescribing abusive doses of neuroleptics to two of his patients and because of his earlier radio and TV claims and comments. The Collège determined that Mailloux posed a threat to the medical profession. However, the CKRS radio station and a viewer circulated a petition for the Collège to reinstate Mailloux until his hearing in front of the discipline committee. He was later reinstated and resumed his practice.

On March 20, 2007, a Journal de Montréal news article reported that in an interview with Télé-Québec's host Richard Martineau, Mailloux said that women manage stress more poorly than men, that they are also less able to make decisions under pressure. However, he also said that women are better than men in other medical fields. He also said he would never work for a woman. He also made rude gestures and obscene language towards the host. Télé-Québec did not air the interview and never released any footage from that single 8-hour-long session at Mailloux's farm.

In September 2007, during an interview on a Rouyn-Noranda radio station, Mailloux made controversial comments about the mayor of Saguenay, Jean Tremblay, after he testified at the Bouchard-Taylor Commission on the reasonable accommodation. In the testimony, Tremblay indicated his favour of maintaining Roman Catholic traditions like the traditional prayer before each city council meeting and keeping the cross in Saguenay's city hall. Mailloux also criticized the people of the city, saying its citizens lacked judgement by voting for Tremblay, also explaining the high unemployment rate in the Saguenay-Lac-Saint-Jean region.
