= Danville metropolitan area =

The Danville metropolitan area may refer to:

- The Danville, Illinois micropolitan area, United States
- The Danville, Virginia micropolitan area, United States
- The Danville, Kentucky micropolitan area, United States

== See also ==
- Danville (disambiguation)
