= Damville Lake =

Freshwater body of the Rivière-Mistassini, Quebec, Canada

- Location within Quebec
- Location: Rivière-Mistassini, Maria-Chapdelaine Regional County Municipality (RCM), Saguenay–Lac-Saint-Jean, Quebec, Canada
- Coordinates: 49°07′27″N 73°05′22″W
- Type: Natural
- Primary inflows: (clockwise from the mouth); 2 streams; outlet of a set of 6 lakes; outlet of Lac du Brochet; outlet of two lakes: Clair and Long; outlet of Lac du Chien; outlet of Lac aux Quenouilles; outlet of a set of lakes; outlet of Lac au Canard; stream
- Primary outflows: Normandin River
- Basin countries: Canada
- Max. length: 7.0 kilometres (4.3 mi)
- Max. width: 2.5 kilometres (1.6 mi)
- Surface elevation: 282 metres (925 ft)

Damville Lake is a freshwater body of the Rivière-Mistassini, unorganized territory of the Maria-Chapdelaine Regional County Municipality, north-west of Saguenay-Lac-Saint-Jean administrative region, in province of Quebec, Canada.

Forestry is the main economic activity of the sector. Recreational tourism activities come second.

Some secondary forest roads serve the vicinity of the lake; these forest roads are mainly attached to the forest road R0202 which runs along the west shore of the lake.

== Geography ==
This lake has a length of 7.0 km (4.3 mi) oriented north-west, a maximum width of 2.5 km (1.6 mi) and an altitude of 282 m (925 ft). The "Black Spruce Mountain" is located on the east side of the lake. A peninsula attached to the east bank stretches for 1.1 km (0.68 mi) to the northwest. This lake has seven large bays. This lake is mainly fed by a stream (coming from the north), by the outlet (coming from the north) from Clair, Long and Éric lakes, as well as the outlet (coming from the southeast) from several lakes.

The mouth of Lake Damville is located at:

- 0.5 kilometres (0.31 mi) north-east of the forest road R0202;
- 1.7 kilometres (1.1 mi) north-east of the course of Ashuapmushuan River;
- 74.3 kilometres (46.2 mi) north-eaest of down-town of Saint-Félicien.

The main hydrographic slopes near Lake Damville are:

- North side: Micosas River, décharge du Lac des Îles;
- East side: Micosas River, rivière aux Rognons;
- South side: Ashuapmushuan River;
- West side: Marquette River West, Kanishushteu River.

From the mouth of Damville Lake (located at the bottom of the north-west bay of the lake), the current crosses an extension of 1.8 km (1.1 mi) of the lake; then descends the course of the rivière aux Brochets on 0.9 km (0.56 mi) toward south-west; descends the Ashuapmushuan River on 100.4 km (62.4 mi), the current crosses Lac Saint-Jean east on 41.1 km (25.5 mi) (its full length), follows the course of the Saguenay River via the Petite Décharge on 172.3 km (107.1 mi) east to Tadoussac where it merges with the Estuary of Saint Lawrence.

== Toponymy ==
The term "Damville" refers to an old French commune in the Eure department in the Normandy region.

The toponym "Lac Ashuapmushuan" was formalized on June 18, 1993, by the Commission de toponymie du Québec.

== See also ==
- List of lakes in Canada
