= Benoît Laprise =

Canadian politician and agricultural technician

Member of the National Assembly of Quebec for Roberval
- In office September 12, 1994 – April 14, 2003
- Preceded by: Gaston Blackburn
- Succeeded by: Karl Blackburn

Personal details
- Born: July 16, 1932 (age 94) Saint-Félicien, Quebec
- Party: Parti Québécois
- Profession: Agricultural Technician

Benoît Laprise (born July 16, 1932) is an agricultural technician and Quebec politician. He represented Roberval in the National Assembly of Quebec from 1994 to 2003, as a member of the Parti Québécois.

Prior to Laprise's election, he was an agricultural technician at the Quebec Ministry of Agriculture, Fisheries and Food for nearly thirty years. He also served as regional Vice-President and President of the Catholic Union of Farmers.

== Political career ==
Laprise was a commissioner of the La Vallière School Board in 1968, he served as President in 1969 and later was president of the Louis-Hémon Regional School Board from 1975 to 1979.

Laprise was elected to the Saint-Félicien municipal council in 1981 and mayor from 1983 until 1994. He served concurrently as deputy prefect of the regional county municipality of Le Domaine-du-Roy in 1993 and 1994.

He ran for the Parti Québécois in Roberval in 1994 and with the retirement of incumbent Gaston Blackburn won handily, he was re-elected in 1998.

He did not seek re-election in 2003.
