= Saint-Augustin, Saguenay–Lac-Saint-Jean =

Saint-Augustin
- Parish municipality
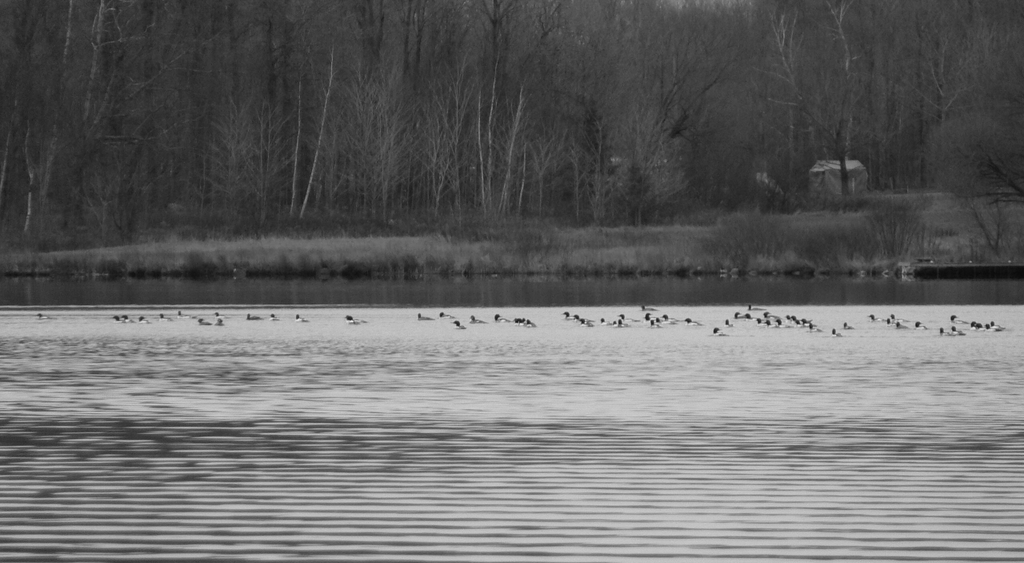
- North shore of the lake

- Location in Saguenay–Lac-Saint-Jean Quebec
- Coordinates: 48°48′N 71°57′W
- Country: Canada
- Province: Quebec
- Region: Saguenay–Lac-Saint-Jean
- RCM: Maria-Chapdelaine
- Settled: 1895
- Constituted: May 14, 1925
- Named for: Augustine of Hippo

Government
  - Mayor: René St-Pierre
  - Federal riding: Jonquière—Hébertville—Pays-des-Bleuets
  - Prov. riding: Roberval

Area
  - Total: 104.00 km^{2} (40.15 sq mi)
  - Land: 104.25 km^{2} (40.25 sq mi)
- There is an apparent contradiction between two authoritative sources

Population (2021)
  - Total: 334
  - Density: 3.2/km^{2} (8.3/sq mi)
  - Pop (2016–21): ▼4.8%
  - Dwellings: 161
- Time zone: UTC−5 (EST)
  - Summer (DST): UTC−4 (EDT)
- Postal code(s): G0W 1K0
- Area codes: 418 and 581
- Website: www.saint-augustin.net

Saint-Augustin (French pronunciation: [sɛ̃t‿oɡystɛ̃]) is a parish municipality in the Maria-Chapdelaine Regional County Municipality in the Saguenay–Lac-Saint-Jean region of Quebec, Canada. The municipality had a population of 334 as of the Canada 2021 Census.

== Demographics ==
In the 2021 Census of Population conducted by Statistics Canada, Saint-Augustin had a population of 334 living in 148 of its 161 total private dwellings, a change of −4.8% from its 2016 population of 351. With a land area of 104.25 km^{2} (40.25 sq mi), it had a population density of 3.2/km^{2} (8.3/sq mi) in 2021.

Population trend:

- Population in 2021: 334 (2016 to 2021 population change: -4.8%)
- Population in 2016: 351 (2011 to 2016 population change: -12.3%)
- Population in 2011: 400 (2006 to 2011 population change: 1.8%)
- Population in 2006: 393
- Population in 2001: 424
- Population in 1996: 486
- Population in 1991: 534
- Population in 1986: 592
- Population in 1981: 586
- Population in 1976: 637
- Population in 1971: 651
- Population in 1966: 762
- Population in 1961: 818
- Population in 1956: 908
- Population in 1951: 952
- Population in 1941: 796
- Population in 1931: 509

Mother tongue:

- English as first language: 0%
- French as first language: 98.5%
- English and French as first language: 0%
- Other as first language: 0%
