= Gaston Blackburn =

Canadian politician

Member of the National Assembly of Quebec for Roberval
- In office June 20, 1988 – September 12, 1994
- Preceded by: Michel Gauthier
- Succeeded by: Benoît Laprise

Personal details
- Born: January 26, 1942 (age 84) Chicoutimi, Quebec
- Party: Quebec Liberal Party
- Children: Karl Blackburn
- Profession: Businessman

Gaston Blackburn (born January 26, 1942) is a merchant, business owner and former political figure in Quebec. He represented Roberval in the Quebec National Assembly from 1988 to 1994 as a Liberal.

He was born in Chicoutimi, Quebec, the son of Alfred Blackburn and Rita Harvey. He first worked in the family grocery business and then was a regional supervisor for Provigo from 1970 to 1973. Blackburn later became the owner of a number of supermarkets and a shopping centre. He was a member of the board of directors for Metro-Richelieu from 1984 to 1987. Blackburn served in the Quebec cabinet as Minister for the Environment, as Minister of Recreation, Hunting and Fisheries and as Minister of Transport. In 1990 he was responsible for ordering the demolition of the Collège St-Gabriel a St-Bruno-de-Montarville landmark. He retired from politics in 1994.

His son Karl also served in the Quebec National Assembly.
