= Antoine Castonguay =

Canadian politician (1881–1959)

Member of the Legislative Assembly of Quebec for Roberval
- In office 1935–1939
- Preceded by: Émile Moreau
- Succeeded by: Georges Potvin

Personal details
- Born: June 14, 1881 Sainte-Hélène, near Kamouraska, Quebec
- Died: May 11, 1959 (aged 77) Chicoutimi, Quebec
- Party: Action libérale nationale Union Nationale

Antoine Castonguay (June 14, 1881 – May 11, 1959) was a politician in Quebec, Canada and a Member of the Legislative Assembly of Quebec (MLA).

== Early life ==
He was born on June 14, 1881, near Kamouraska, Bas-Saint-Laurent.

== Mayor ==
Castonguay served as Mayor of Saint-Félicien in Saguenay-Lac-Saint-Jean from 1935 to 1940.

== Member of the legislature ==
He ran as an Action libérale nationale candidate in the district of Roberval in the 1935 provincial election and won. Castonguay joined Maurice Duplessis's Union Nationale and was re-elected in 1936. He was defeated by Liberal candidate Georges Potvin in 1939.

== Death ==
He died on May 11, 1959, in Chicoutimi.
