= Notre-Dame-de-Lorette, Quebec =

Notre-Dame-de-Lorette
- Municipality

- Location in Saguenay–Lac-Saint-Jean Quebec.
- Coordinates: 49°05′N 72°21′W
- Country: Canada
- Province: Quebec
- Region: Saguenay–Lac-Saint-Jean
- RCM: Maria-Chapdelaine
- Settled: 1931
- Constituted: January 1, 1966

Government
  - Mayor: Daniel Tremblay
  - Federal riding: Lac-Saint-Jean
  - Prov. riding: Roberval

Area
  - Total: 339.50 km^{2} (131.08 sq mi)
  - Land: 325.77 km^{2} (125.78 sq mi)

Population (2021)
  - Total: 159
  - Density: 0.5/km^{2} (1.3/sq mi)
  - Pop (2016–21): ▼15.9%
  - Dwellings: 116
- Time zone: UTC−5 (EST)
  - Summer (DST): UTC−4 (EDT)
- Postal code(s): G0W 1B0
- Area codes: 418 and 581

Notre-Dame-de-Lorette (French pronunciation: [nɔtʁ(ə) dam də lɔʁɛt]) is a municipality in the Canadian province of Quebec, located within the regional county municipality of Maria-Chapdelaine. With a population of 159 in the Canada 2021 Census, it is the least populated and northernmost municipality in the Saguenay–Lac-Saint-Jean region.

== Demographics ==
Population trend:

- Population in 2021: 159 (2016 to 2021 population change: -15.9%)
- Population in 2016: 189
- Population in 2011: 189
- Population in 2006: 175
- Population in 2001: 216
- Population in 1996: 234
- Population in 1991: 258

Private dwellings occupied by usual residents: 92 (total dwellings: 116)

Mother tongue:

- English as first language: 0%
- French as first language: 96.9%
- English and French as first language: 0%
- Other as first language: 0%
