= Normandin, Quebec =

Normandin
- City
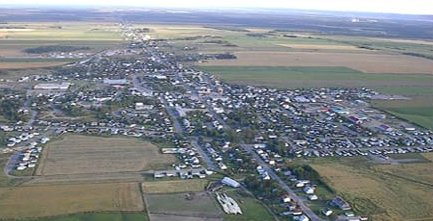
- Aerial view of Normandin

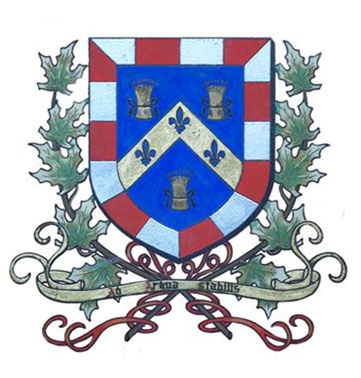
- Coat of arms

- Location in Saguenay–Lac-Saint-Jean Quebec.
- Coordinates: 48°50′N 72°32′W
- Country: Canada
- Province: Quebec
- Region: Saguenay–Lac-Saint-Jean
- RCM: Maria-Chapdelaine
- Settled: 1878
- Constituted: March 10, 1979

Government
  - Mayor: Jacinthe Doucet
  - Federal riding: Lac-Saint-Jean
  - Prov. riding: Roberval

Area
  - City: 216.20 km^{2} (83.48 sq mi)
  - Land: 211.79 km^{2} (81.77 sq mi)
  - Urban: 1.93 km^{2} (0.75 sq mi)

Population (2021)
  - City: 2,991
  - Density: 14.1/km^{2} (37/sq mi)
  - Urban: 1,880
  - Urban density: 975.1/km^{2} (2,525/sq mi)
  - Pop (2016–21): ▼1.4%
  - Dwellings: 1,382
- Time zone: UTC−5 (EST)
  - Summer (DST): UTC−4 (EDT)
- Postal code(s): G8M
- Area codes: 418 and 581
- Website: www.ville.normandin.qc.ca

Normandin (French pronunciation: [nɔʁmɑ̃dɛ̃]) is a city located on the west side of Lac Saint-Jean in the Canadian province of Quebec.

Normandin is named after the surveyor Joseph-Laurent Normandin. Its history of European-Canadian settlement began in 1878 when the first pioneers arrived. Alphonse Laliberté was elected as Normandin's first mayor in 1890. In 1926, the village was set up as a municipality distinct from the township; the notary J.S.N. Turcotte occupied the function of first magistrate.

The city is the birthplace of radio talk show psychiatrist Pierre Mailloux. It is also the hometown (though not birthplace) of André Dédé Fortin, the late lead singer of Les Colocs.

== Demographics ==
In the 2021 Census of Population conducted by Statistics Canada, Normandin had a population of 2,991 living in 1,315 of its 1,382 total private dwellings, a change of −1.4% from its 2016 population of 3,033. With a land area of 211.79 km^{2} (81.77 sq mi), it had a population density of 14.1/km^{2} (36.6/sq mi) in 2021.

In 2021, the median age was 45.2, as opposed to 41.6 for all of Canada. French was the mother tongue of 99.5% of residents in 2021. The next most common mother tongues were English at 0.3%, followed by Spanish at 0.2%. 0.3% reported both English and French as their first language.

As of 2021, Indigenous peoples comprised 5.2% of the population, most of whom were Métis, and visible minorities contributed 0.5%. The largest visible minority groups in Normandin are Black (0.2%) and Latin American (0.2%).

In 2021, 78.9% of the population identified as Catholic, a 22.0% decrease from 2011, while 14.5% said they had no religious affiliation. Jehovah's Witnesses were the largest religious minority, making up 0.7% of the population. There were no non-Christian religious minorities.

Counting both single and multiple responses, the most commonly identified ethnocultural ancestries were:

Ethnic origin	2021
Canadian	48.3%
French	16.7%
Québécois	15.5%
French Canadian	6.2%
First Nations	3.4%
Acadian	1.9%
Irish	1.4%
Métis	1.4%

(Percentages may total more than 100% due to rounding and multiple responses).

Population trend:

- Population in 2021: 2,991 (2016 to 2021 population change: -1.4%)
- Population in 2016: 3,033
- Population in 2011: 3,137
- Population in 2006: 3,220
- Population in 2001: 3,524
- Population in 1996: 3,873
- Population in 1991: 3,957
- Population in 1986: 4,069
- Population in 1981: 4,041

== Notable people ==
- Gilles Bouchard (born 1971), Canadian ice hockey coach
- Pierre Mailloux (born 1949), Canadian psychiatrist and radio host
