= Émile Moreau (politician) =

Canadian politician

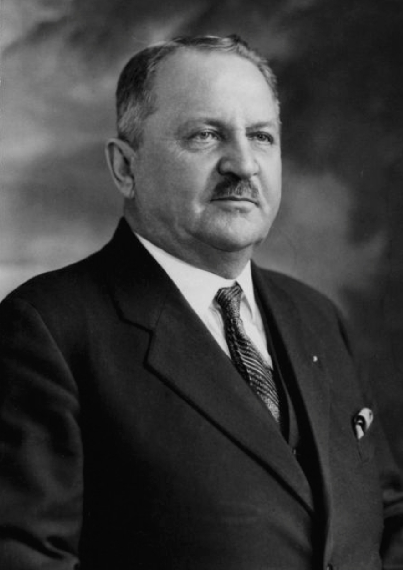

Member of the Legislative Assembly of Quebec for Lac-Saint-Jean
- In office 1919–1931
- Preceded by: Jean-Sylvio-Narcisse Turcotte
- Succeeded by: Joseph-Ludger Fillion

Member of the Legislative Assembly of Quebec for Roberval
- In office 1931–1935
- Preceded by: District created
- Succeeded by: Antoine Castonguay

Member of the Legislative Council of Quebec for Lauzon
- In office 1935–1959
- Preceded by: Eugène Roberge
- Succeeded by: Gérald Martineau

Personal details
- Born: June 20, 1877 Saint-Cyrille-de-Lessard, Quebec
- Died: January 28, 1959 (aged 81) Quebec City, Quebec
- Party: Liberal
- Spouse: Albertine Nobert

Émile Moreau (20 June 1877 – 28 January 1959) was a Francophone Canadian politician of the Quebec Liberal Party. He was elected member of the Legislative Assembly of Quebec for Lac-Saint-Jean (1919–1931) and then Roberval (1931–1935), at the 15th, 16th and 18th Assemblies. He was also Legislative Councillor for Lauzon (6 June 1935 – 1959).
