= Girardville, Quebec =

Girardville
- Municipality
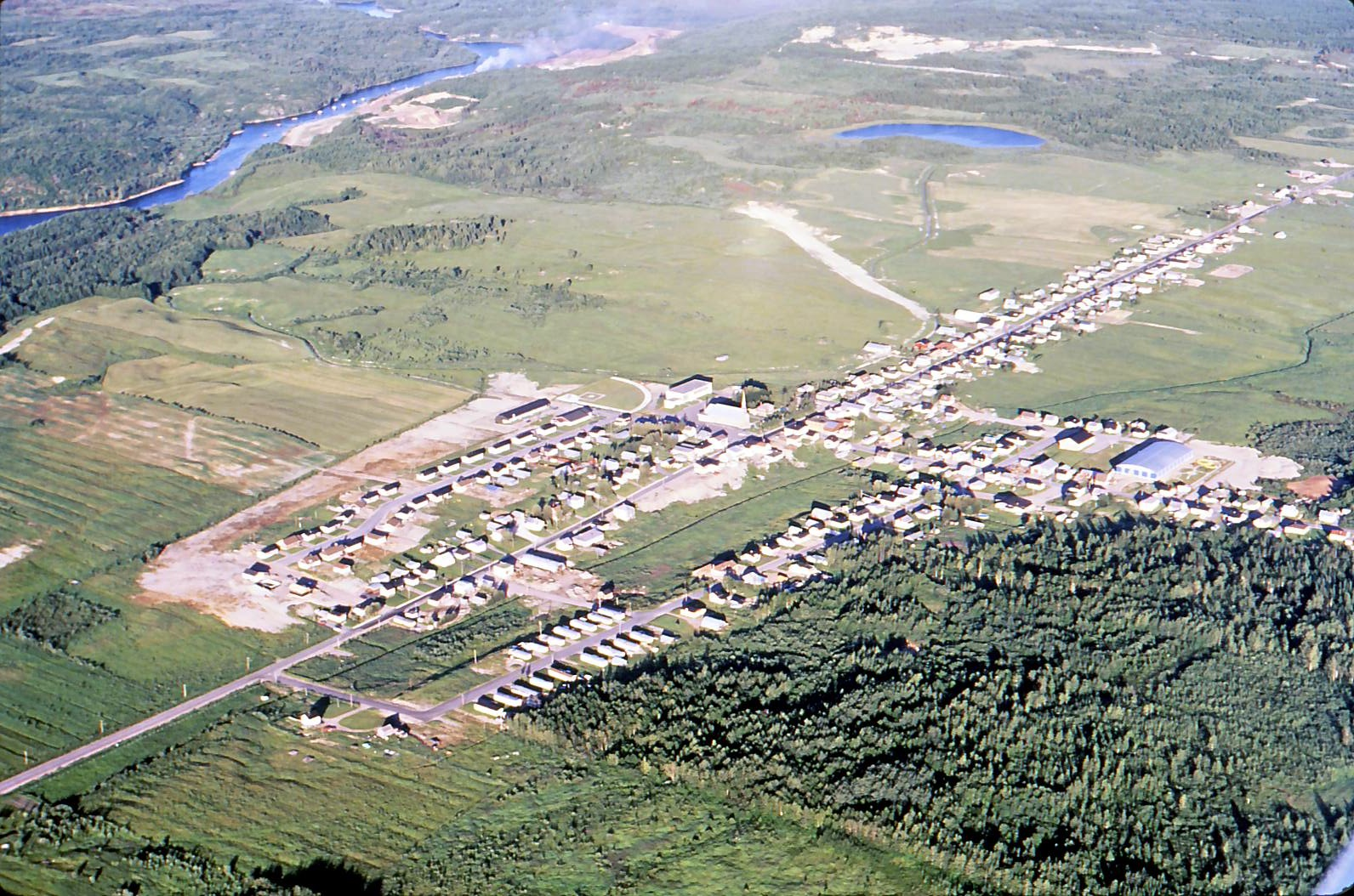

- Location in Saguenay–Lac-Saint-Jean Quebec
- Coordinates: 49°00′N 72°33′W
- Country: Canada
- Province: Quebec
- Region: Saguenay–Lac-Saint-Jean
- RCM: Maria-Chapdelaine
- Settled: 1899
- Constituted: November 11, 1921

Government
  - Mayor: Jeanne Savard
  - Federal riding: Lac-Saint-Jean
  - Prov. riding: Roberval

Area
  - Total: 133.10 km^{2} (51.39 sq mi)
  - Land: 124.11 km^{2} (47.92 sq mi)

Population (2021)
  - Total: 1,018
  - Density: 8.2/km^{2} (21/sq mi)
  - Pop (2016–21): ▲3%
  - Dwellings: 511
- Time zone: UTC−5 (EST)
  - Summer (DST): UTC−4 (EDT)
- Postal code(s): G0W 1R0
- Area codes: 418 and 581
- Climate: Dfb
- Website: www.ville.girardville.qc.ca

Girardville (French pronunciation: [ʒiʁaʁvil]) is a municipality in the Canadian province of Quebec, located within the regional county municipality of Maria-Chapdelaine. The municipality had a population of 1,018 in the Canada 2021 Census. The municipality is named in honour of Joseph Girard, former federal deputy for Lac-St-Jean County.

== Climate ==
Climate data for Girardville (Hémon), Quebec: 183 m (600 ft) (1981–2010 normals, extremes 1963–2002)
| Month | Jan | Feb | Mar | Apr | May | Jun | Jul | Aug | Sep | Oct | Nov | Dec | Year |
|---|---|---|---|---|---|---|---|---|---|---|---|---|---|
| Record high °C (°F) | 11.0 (51.8) | 12.0 (53.6) | 19.0 (66.2) | 30.0 (86.0) | 33.5 (92.3) | 35.0 (95.0) | 35.0 (95.0) | 37.8 (100.0) | 31.5 (88.7) | 25.5 (77.9) | 18.3 (64.9) | 10.0 (50.0) | 37.8 (100.0) |
| Mean daily maximum °C (°F) | −11.9 (10.6) | −8.0 (17.6) | −1.2 (29.8) | 7.5 (45.5) | 16.5 (61.7) | 21.9 (71.4) | 23.8 (74.8) | 22.4 (72.3) | 16.6 (61.9) | 9.1 (48.4) | 0.4 (32.7) | −7.4 (18.7) | 7.5 (45.4) |
| Daily mean °C (°F) | −19.3 (−2.7) | −16.2 (2.8) | −8.7 (16.3) | 1.1 (34.0) | 9.1 (48.4) | 14.4 (57.9) | 16.9 (62.4) | 15.4 (59.7) | 10.4 (50.7) | 4.1 (39.4) | −4.2 (24.4) | −13.7 (7.3) | 0.8 (33.4) |
| Mean daily minimum °C (°F) | −26.6 (−15.9) | −24.4 (−11.9) | −16.2 (2.8) | −5.3 (22.5) | 1.6 (34.9) | 6.9 (44.4) | 9.9 (49.8) | 8.4 (47.1) | 4.2 (39.6) | −1.0 (30.2) | −8.7 (16.3) | −20.0 (−4.0) | −5.9 (21.3) |
| Record low °C (°F) | −49.0 (−56.2) | −50.6 (−59.1) | −42.8 (−45.0) | −32.0 (−25.6) | −13.9 (7.0) | −6.5 (20.3) | −1.7 (28.9) | −3.3 (26.1) | −8.3 (17.1) | −17.8 (0.0) | −32.0 (−25.6) | −47.0 (−52.6) | −50.6 (−59.1) |
| Average precipitation mm (inches) | 72.7 (2.86) | 50.7 (2.00) | 56.2 (2.21) | 67.5 (2.66) | 90.1 (3.55) | 93.6 (3.69) | 122.7 (4.83) | 99.8 (3.93) | 100.9 (3.97) | 76.2 (3.00) | 83.9 (3.30) | 74.8 (2.94) | 989.1 (38.94) |
| Average snowfall cm (inches) | 68.9 (27.1) | 45.2 (17.8) | 37.2 (14.6) | 19.4 (7.6) | 2.6 (1.0) | 0.0 (0.0) | 0.0 (0.0) | 0.0 (0.0) | 0.0 (0.0) | 4.9 (1.9) | 36.5 (14.4) | 65.7 (25.9) | 280.4 (110.3) |
| Average precipitation days (≥ 0.2 mm) | 12.4 | 8.7 | 8.4 | 9.7 | 14.6 | 14.7 | 19.2 | 18.1 | 18.6 | 14.4 | 12.1 | 12.1 | 163 |
| Average snowy days (≥ 0.2 cm) | 12.0 | 8.0 | 6.2 | 2.9 | 0.3 | 0.0 | 0.0 | 0.0 | 0.0 | 0.9 | 6.5 | 11.0 | 47.8 |
Source: Environment Canada

== Demographics ==
Population trend:

- Population in 2021: 1018 (2016 to 2021 population change: 3%)
- Population in 2016: 988
- Population in 2011: 1100
- Population in 2006: 1186
- Population in 2001: 1285
- Population in 1996: 1350
- Population in 1991: 1391

Private dwellings occupied by usual residents: 470 (total dwellings: 511)

Mother tongue:

- English as first language: 0.5%
- French as first language: 99%
- English and French as first language: 0%
- Other as first language: 0.5%

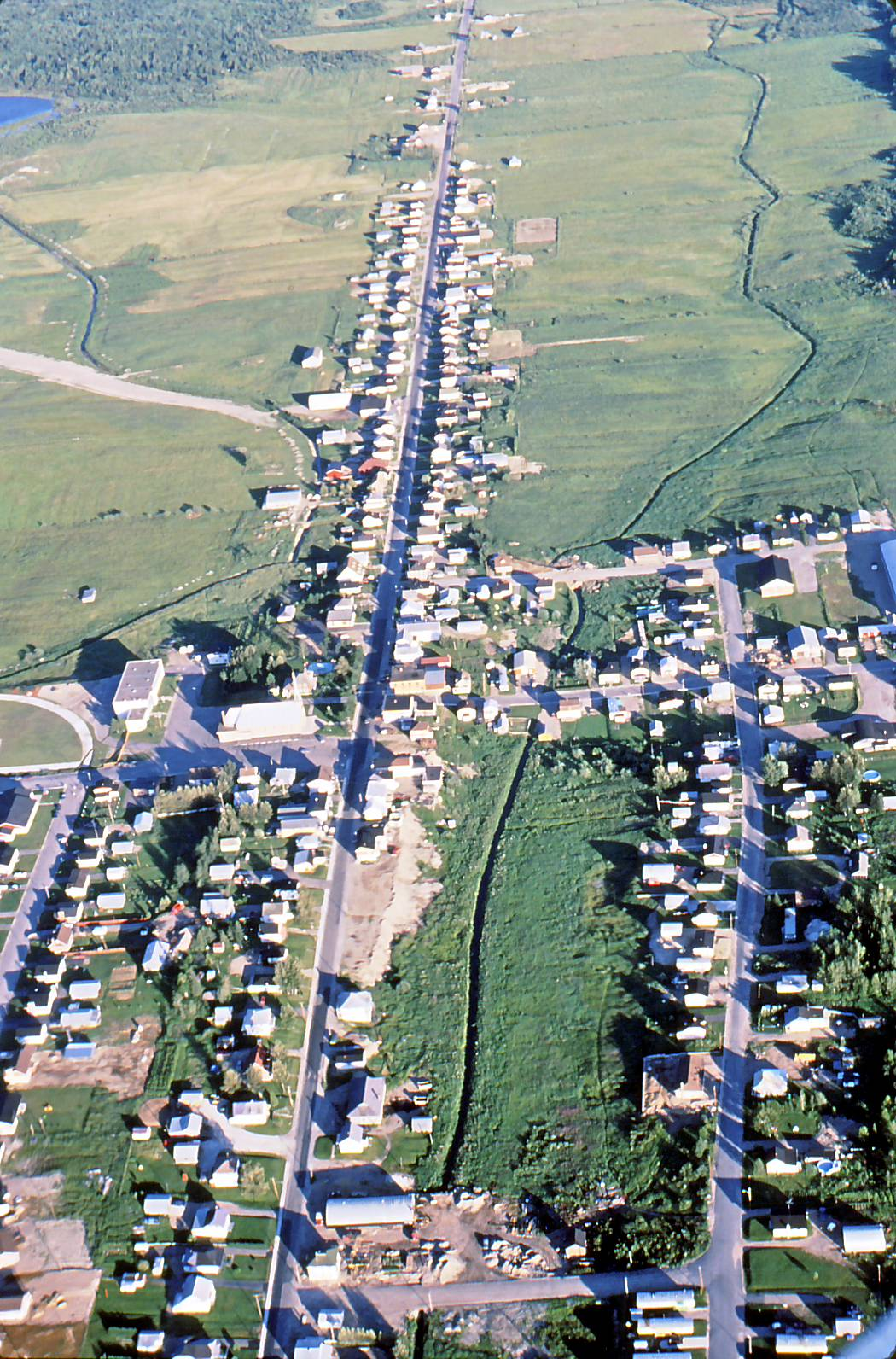
