= Saint-Stanislas, Saguenay–Lac-Saint-Jean =

Saint-Stanislas
- Municipality
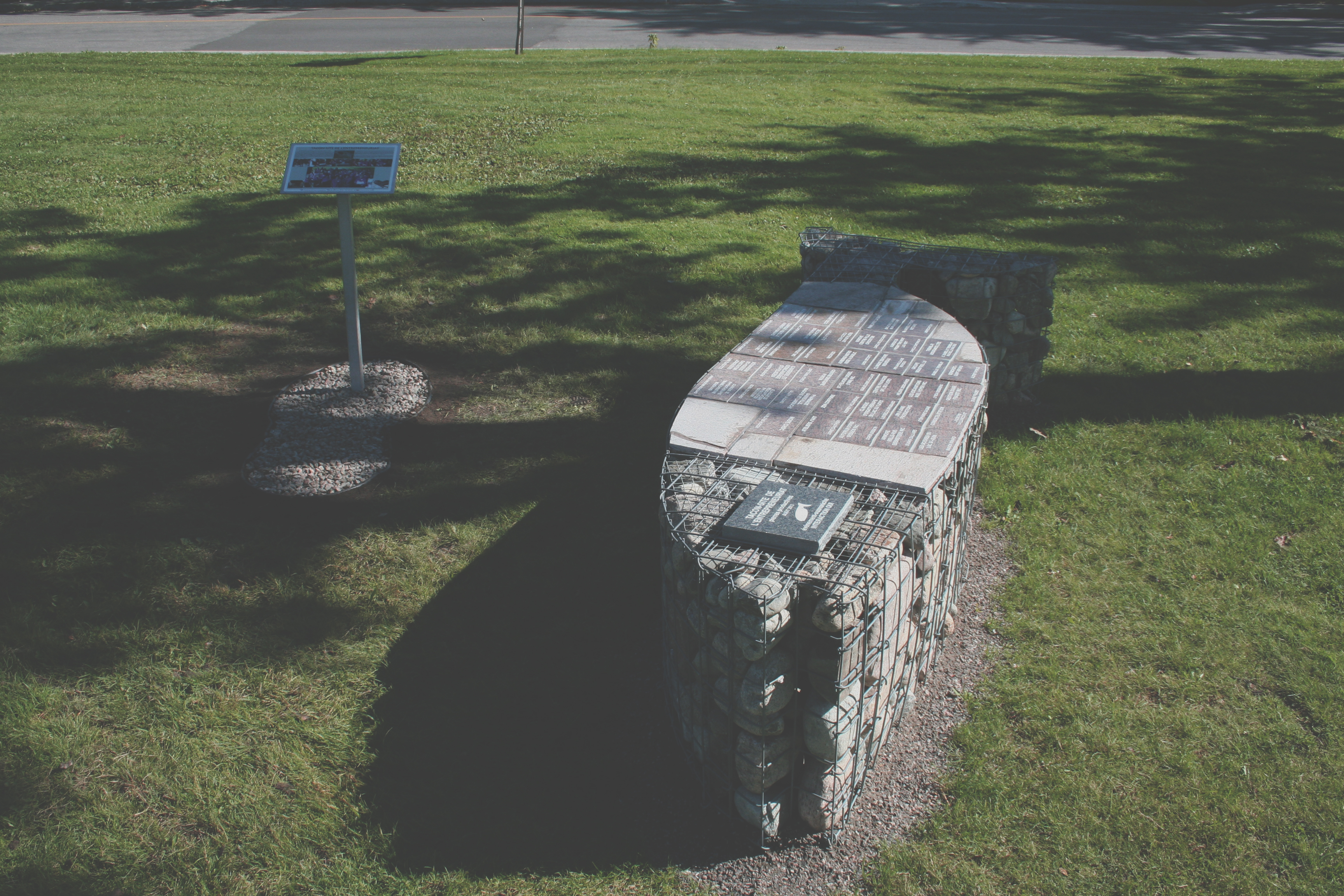

- Location in Saguenay–Lac-Saint-Jean Quebec.
- Coordinates: 49°00′N 72°11′W
- Country: Canada
- Province: Quebec
- Region: Saguenay–Lac-Saint-Jean
- RCM: Maria-Chapdelaine
- Settled: 1929
- Constituted: October 24, 1931

Government
  - Mayor: Mario Biron
  - Federal riding: Jonquière—Hébertville—Pays-des-Bleuets
  - Prov. riding: Roberval

Area
  - Total: 162.10 km^{2} (62.59 sq mi)
  - Land: 153.58 km^{2} (59.30 sq mi)

Population (2021)
  - Total: 376
  - Density: 2.3/km^{2} (6.0/sq mi)
  - Pop (2016–21): ▲0.8%
  - Dwellings: 223
- Time zone: UTC−5 (EST)
  - Summer (DST): UTC−4 (EDT)
- Postal code(s): G8L 7B4
- Area codes: 418 and 581
- Website: www.sadcmaria.qc.ca/...

Saint-Stanislas (French pronunciation: [sɛ̃ stanislas]) is a municipality in Maria-Chapdelaine Regional County Municipality in the Saguenay–Lac-Saint-Jean region of Quebec, Canada. Its population was 376 in the Canada 2021 Census.

== Demographics ==
Population trend:

- Population in 2021: 376 (2016 to 2021 population change: 0.8%)
- Population in 2016: 373
- Population in 2011: 353
- Population in 2006: 345
- Population in 2001: 340
- Population in 1996: 319
- Population in 1991: 322
- Population in 1986: 376
- Population in 1981: 380
- Population in 1976: 429
- Population in 1971: 601
- Population in 1966: 737
- Population in 1961: 867
- Population in 1956: 959
- Population in 1951: 975
- Population in 1941: 869

Private dwellings occupied by usual residents: 163 (total dwellings: 223)

Mother tongue:

- English as first language: 0%
- French as first language: 100%
- English and French as first language: 0%
- Other as first language: 0%
