= Mistassibi River =

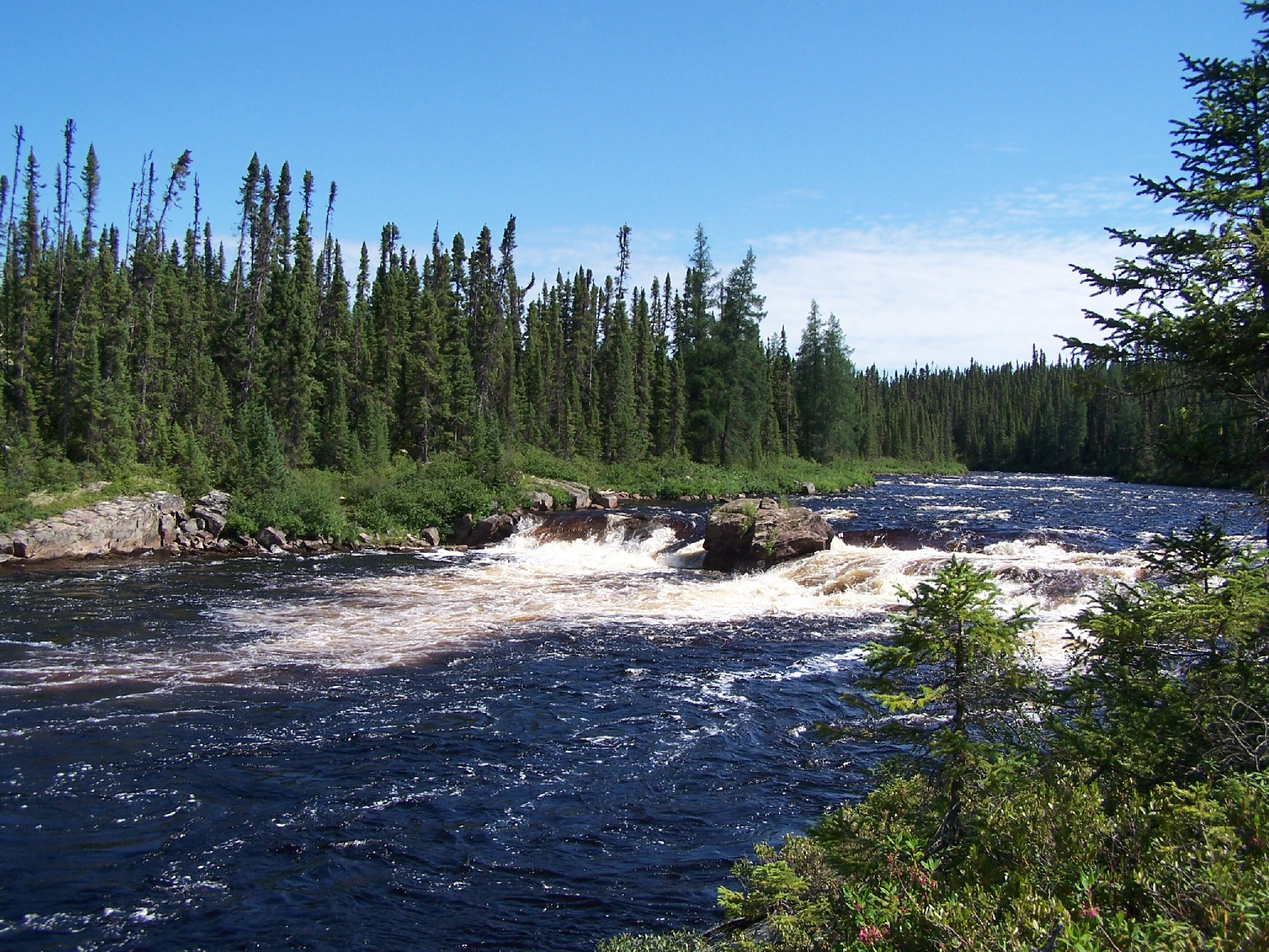

Location
- Country: Canada
- Province: Quebec
- Region: Saguenay–Lac-Saint-Jean

Physical characteristics
- Source: Unnamed wilderness
  - coordinates: 51°07′31″N 72°03′06″W
  - elevation: 575 m (1,886 ft)
- Mouth: Mistassini River
  - location: Dolbeau-Mistassini
  - coordinates: 48°53′04″N 72°13′05″W
  - elevation: 115 m (377 ft)
- Length: 298 km (185 mi)
- Basin size: 9,325 km^{2} (3,600 sq mi)

Basin features
- Tributaries
  - left: North-East Mistassibi River

The Mistassibi River is a river in central Quebec, Canada. It is 298 kilometres (185 mi) long and has a drainage basin of 9,325 square kilometres (3,600 sq mi). Its source is an area with unnamed lakes about 50 kilometres (31 mi) east of Canso Bay of Lake Albanel, eastern neighbor of Lake Mistassini.

The name Mistassibi, only in use since the late 19th century, comes from the Innu-aimun language, meaning "large river". Its alternate name used to be Rivière aux Foins (Hay River).

Just like the nearby Mistassini River, the Mistassibi River runs in a north–south direction. It passes through Lac au Foin (Hay Lake) and among its tributaries are the aux Oiseaux, du Dépôt, and North-East Mistassibi Rivers. It drains into the Mistassini River at Dolbeau-Mistassini.

The company Minashtuk Inc. operates a 12 MW run-of-the-river hydroelectric power station on the Mistassibi River since 2000.
