= Saint-Edmond-les-Plaines =

- Municipality

- Location in Saguenay–Lac-Saint-Jean Quebec.
- Coordinates: 48°54′N 72°33′W
- Country: Canada
- Province: Quebec
- Region: Saguenay–Lac-Saint-Jean
- RCM: Maria-Chapdelaine
- Constituted: September 3, 1938

Government
  - Mayor: Martial Gauthier
  - Federal riding: Lac-Saint-Jean
  - Prov. riding: Roberval

Area
  - Total: 85.80 km^{2} (33.13 sq mi)
  - Land: 84.15 km^{2} (32.49 sq mi)

Population (2011)
  - Total: 390
  - Density: 4.6/km^{2} (12/sq mi)
  - Pop (2006–11): ▼9.7%
  - Dwellings: 179
- Time zone: UTC−5 (EST)
  - Summer (DST): UTC−4 (EDT)
- Postal code(s): G0W 2M0
- Area codes: 418 and 581
- Website: www.stedmond.ca

Saint-Edmond-les-Plaines (French pronunciation: [sɛ̃t‿ɛdmɔ̃ le plɛn]) is a municipality in the Canadian province of Quebec, located within the regional county municipality of Maria-Chapdelaine. The municipality had a population of 390 as of the Canada 2011 Census.

Before November 27, 2004, it was known simply as Saint-Edmond.

== Demographics ==
Population trend:

- Population in 2011: 390 (2006 to 2011 population change: -9.7%)
- Population in 2006: 432
- Population in 2001: 518
- Population in 1996: 585
- Population in 1991: 592

Private dwellings occupied by usual residents: 167 (total dwellings: 179)

Mother tongue:

- English as first language: 0%
- French as first language: 100%
- English and French as first language: 0%
- Other as first language: 0%
