= Saint-Thomas-Didyme =

- Municipality
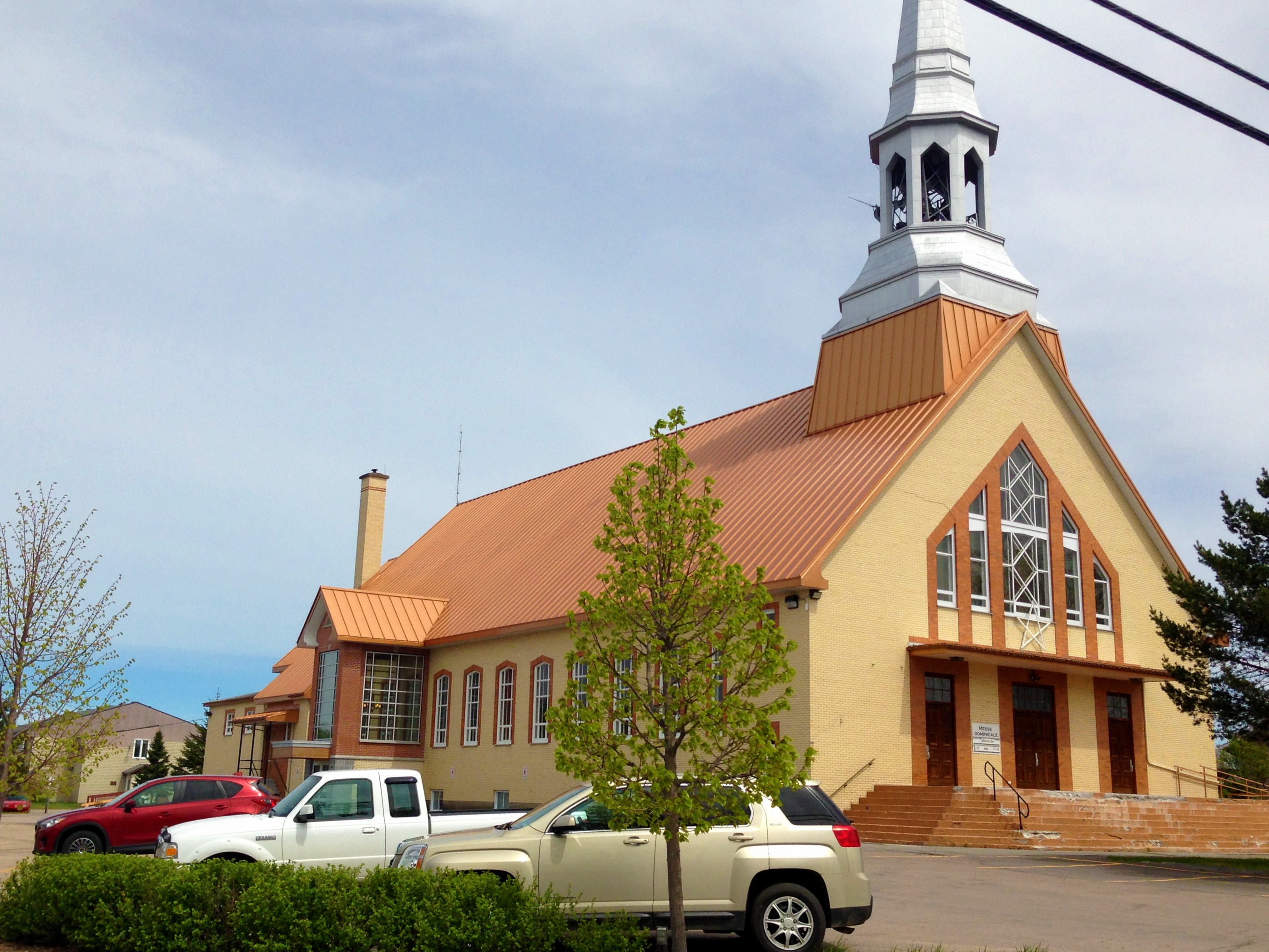

- Location in Saguenay–Lac-Saint-Jean Quebec.
- Coordinates: 48°54′N 72°40′W
- Country: Canada
- Province: Quebec
- Region: Saguenay–Lac-Saint-Jean
- RCM: Maria-Chapdelaine
- Settled: 1910s
- Constituted: May 11, 1923

Government
  - Mayor: Sylvie Coulombe
  - Federal riding: Lac-Saint-Jean
  - Prov. riding: Roberval

Area
  - Total: 357.20 km^{2} (137.92 sq mi)
  - Land: 333.25 km^{2} (128.67 sq mi)

Population (2021)
  - Total: 703
  - Density: 2.1/km^{2} (5.4/sq mi)
  - Pop (2016–21): ▲4%
  - Dwellings: 518
- Time zone: UTC−5 (EST)
  - Summer (DST): UTC−4 (EDT)
- Postal code(s): G0W 1P0
- Area codes: 418 and 581
- Highways: No major routes
- Website: www.stthomasdidyme.qc.ca

Saint-Thomas-Didyme (French pronunciation: [sɛ̃ tɔma didim]) is a municipality in Maria-Chapdelaine Regional County Municipality in the Saguenay–Lac-Saint-Jean region of Quebec, Canada. It had a population of 703 in the Canada 2021 Census.

== Demographics ==
Population trend:

- Population in 2021: 703 (2016 to 2021 population change: 4%)
- Population in 2016: 676
- Population in 2011: 677
- Population in 2006: 708
- Population in 2001: 797
- Population in 1996: 855
- Population in 1991: 944
- Population in 1986: 984
- Population in 1981: 1,006
- Population in 1976: 1,035
- Population in 1971: 1,156
- Population in 1966: 1,252
- Population in 1961: 1,310
- Population in 1956: 1,338
- Population in 1951: 1,233
- Population in 1941: 903
- Population in 1931: 752

Private dwellings occupied by usual residents: 364 (total dwellings: 518)

Mother tongue:

- English as first language: 0%
- French as first language: 96.5%
- English and French as first language: 0%
- Other as first language: 3.5%
