= Danville =

Danville or Dansville may refer to:

== Places ==
=== Canada ===
- Danville, Quebec

=== United States ===
- Danville, Alabama, an unincorporated community
- Danville, Arkansas, a city
- Danville, California, a city
- Danville, Georgia, a town
- Danville, Illinois, a city
- Danville, Indiana, a town
- Danville, Iowa, a city
- Danville, Kansas, a city
- Danville, Kentucky, a city
- Danville, Allegany County, Maryland, a census-designated place
- Danville, Prince George's County, Maryland, an unincorporated community
- Dansville, Michigan, a village
- Danville, Mississippi, a ghost town
- Danville, Missouri, a census-designated place
- Danville, New Hampshire, a town
- Dansville, Livingston County, New York, a village in the town of North Dansville
- Dansville, Steuben County, New York, a town
- Danville, Ohio, a village
- Danville, Pennsylvania, a borough
- Danville, Texas, a neighborhood of the city of Kilgore
- Danville, Vermont, a New England town
  - Danville (CDP), Vermont, census-designated place within the town
- Danville, Virginia, an independent city
- Danville, Washington, a census-designated place
- Danville, West Virginia, a town
- Danville, Wisconsin, an unincorporated community
- North Dansville, New York, a town in Livingston County

=== South Africa ===
- Danville, Pretoria, a suburb of Pretoria, Gauteng Province

== Television ==
- Jo Danville (CSI: NY)
- Danville, a fictional city in the television series Phineas and Ferb and Milo Murphy's Law

== See also ==
- Damville (disambiguation)
- Denville
