= Dolbeau-Mistassini =

- City
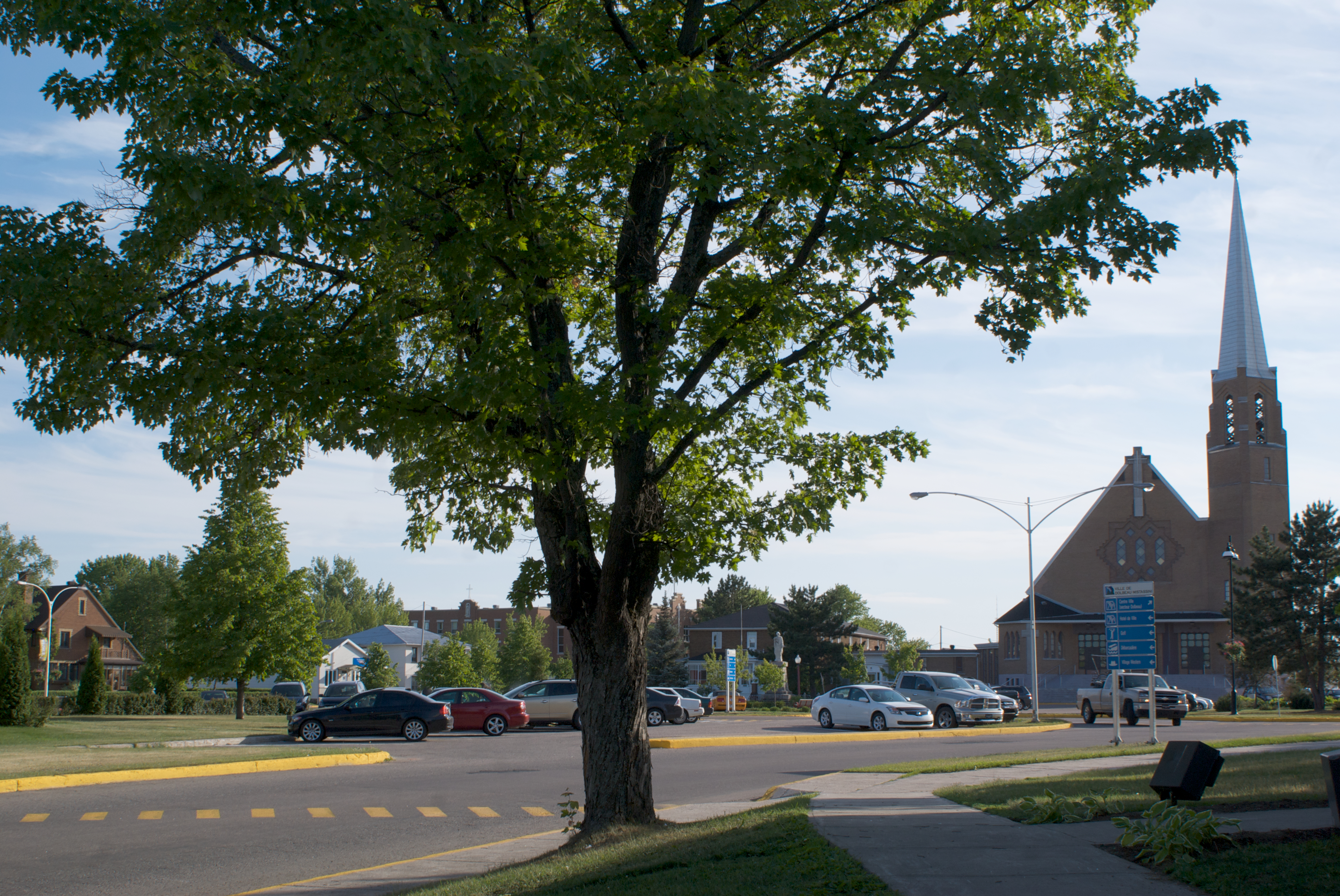
- Church of Dolbeau-Mistassini

- Location in Saguenay–Lac-Saint-Jean, Quebec
- Coordinates: 48°52′35″N 72°13′33″W
- Country: Canada
- Province: Quebec
- Region: Saguenay–Lac-Saint-Jean
- RCM: Maria-Chapdelaine
- Settled: 1892
- Constituted: December 17, 1997

Government
  - Mayor: Rémi Rousseau
  - Federal riding: Lac-Saint-Jean
  - Prov. riding: Roberval

Area
  - City: 355.60 km^{2} (137.30 sq mi)
  - Land: 295.67 km^{2} (114.16 sq mi)
  - Urban: 10.49 km^{2} (4.05 sq mi)
  - Metro: 651.79 km^{2} (251.66 sq mi)

Population (2021)
  - City: 13,718
  - Density: 46.8/km^{2} (121/sq mi)
  - Urban: 10,849
  - Urban density: 1,034.4/km^{2} (2,679/sq mi)
  - Metro: 15,306
  - Metro density: 23.6/km^{2} (61/sq mi)
  - Pop (2006–11): ▼2.8%
  - Dwellings: 6,866
- Time zone: UTC−5 (EST)
  - Summer (DST): UTC−4 (EDT)
- Postal code(s): G8L
- Area codes: 418 and 581
- Climate: Dfb
- Website: www.ville.dolbeau-mistassini.qc.ca

Dolbeau-Mistassini (French pronunciation: [dɔlbo mistasini]) is a town in northern Quebec, Canada, at the confluence of the Mistassibi River, Riviere aux Rats and the Mistassini River, on Lac Saint-Jean. Dolbeau-Mistassini is in the Maria-Chapdelaine Regional County Municipality and is the commercial hub of Lac-St-Jean with big stores and shopping centres.

The city was formed in 1997 through the amalgamation of the cities of Dolbeau and Mistassini. Dolbeau is located on the right (west) bank of the Mistassini River, in the geographic township of Parent (not in the adjacent Dolbeau Township). The town of Mistassini is on the left (east) bank of the Mistassini River at the confluence with the Mistassibi River, directly opposite Dolbeau.

== History ==
The first settler in Mistassini may have been François Gaudreault in 1884. But credit is given to Trappists for founding the town, an exceptional case in Quebec. In 1892, the Trappists of Oka were granted 2,025 hectares (5,000 acres) of land between the Mistassini and Mistassibi Rivers by the government of Charles Boucher de Boucherville. They first settled at the mouth of the Mistassibi then on the shores of Lac Saint-Jean. In 1895, the Parish of Saint-Michel-de-Mistassini was founded, and two years later, it was incorporated as a municipality.

In 1930, the town centre of Saint-Michel-de-Mistassini separated from the municipality to form the Village Municipality of Mistassini. During the construction of the Chute-des-Passes Dam on the Peribonka River in 1944, it experienced commercial growth and gained city status in 1947. In 1976, the Municipality of Saint-Michel-de-Mistassini and the Village Municipality of Mistassini were merged again to form the City of Mistassini.

As for Dolbeau, it was founded in 1926 by Swedish-born industrialist Emil Andrew Wallberg and his industrial German-born partner John Stadler who established there the Lake Saint John Power and Paper Co. paper mill. The town, incorporated in 1927, was named after Jean Dolbeau (1586–1652), Récollet missionary in the Tadoussac and Lac Saint-Jean area from 1615 to 1617 and from 1618 to 1620.

On December 17, 1997, the cities of Dolbeau and Mistassini were merged to form the City of Dolbeau-Mistassini.

== Geography ==
=== Climate ===
Dolbeau-Mistassini has a humid continental climate (Köppen Dfb) with mild summers and cold winters. It has less of an influence of the nearby lake than Roberval and as such has higher diurnal temperature variation. In winter, when lake moderation disappears through it freezing over, average lows fall to −25 °C (−13 °F). March remains a winter month as spring is delayed until April, when a rapid warmup ensues that brings summer average highs to about 24 °C (75 °F).

Climate data for Mistassini
Month	Jan	Feb	Mar	Apr	May	Jun	Jul	Aug	Sep	Oct	Nov	Dec	Year
Record high °C (°F)	7.8 (46.0)	8 (46)	16 (61)	28.5 (83.3)	33 (91)	36.1 (97.0)	36 (97)	36.7 (98.1)	31.5 (88.7)	26.1 (79.0)	17.8 (64.0)	10.5 (50.9)	36.7 (98.1)
Mean daily maximum °C (°F)	−11.8 (10.8)	−9.5 (14.9)	−1.1 (30.0)	7.3 (45.1)	16.4 (61.5)	21.9 (71.4)	23.9 (75.0)	22.4 (72.3)	16.4 (61.5)	8.8 (47.8)	0.9 (33.6)	−8.1 (17.4)	7.3 (45.1)
Daily mean °C (°F)	−18.5 (−1.3)	−16.7 (1.9)	−7.3 (18.9)	2.1 (35.8)	9.9 (49.8)	15.2 (59.4)	17.6 (63.7)	16.3 (61.3)	10.9 (51.6)	4.4 (39.9)	−3.1 (26.4)	−13.7 (7.3)	1.4 (34.5)
Mean daily minimum °C (°F)	−24.9 (−12.8)	−23.8 (−10.8)	−13.6 (7.5)	−3.1 (26.4)	3.4 (38.1)	8.5 (47.3)	11.2 (52.2)	10 (50)	5.4 (41.7)	0.1 (32.2)	−7.1 (19.2)	−19.4 (−2.9)	−4.4 (24.1)
Record low °C (°F)	−46.1 (−51.0)	−46.1 (−51.0)	−40 (−40)	−27.8 (−18.0)	−11.7 (10.9)	−5 (23)	0.6 (33.1)	−1.7 (28.9)	−7 (19)	−13.3 (8.1)	−32.2 (−26.0)	−45 (−49)	−46.1 (−51.0)
Average precipitation mm (inches)	62.9 (2.48)	41.7 (1.64)	47.4 (1.87)	52.6 (2.07)	84.3 (3.32)	81.6 (3.21)	117.1 (4.61)	111.9 (4.41)	103.7 (4.08)	79.6 (3.13)	66.7 (2.63)	70.3 (2.77)	919.9 (36.22)
Average rainfall mm (inches)	6.3 (0.25)	2 (0.1)	16.2 (0.64)	40.1 (1.58)	83.6 (3.29)	81.6 (3.21)	117.1 (4.61)	111.9 (4.41)	103.7 (4.08)	73.9 (2.91)	39.6 (1.56)	6.2 (0.24)	682.1 (26.85)
Average snowfall cm (inches)	56.6 (22.3)	39.7 (15.6)	31.2 (12.3)	12.5 (4.9)	0.7 (0.3)	0 (0)	0 (0)	0 (0)	0 (0)	5.8 (2.3)	27.2 (10.7)	64.1 (25.2)	237.8 (93.6)
Average precipitation days (≥ 0.2 mm)	12.1	9.5	9.3	9.8	12.8	15.0	16.7	17.0	17.3	15.1	12.3	14.1	160.8
Average rainy days (≥ 0.2 mm)	0.8	0.6	3.0	7.4	12.7	15.0	16.7	17.0	17.3	13.8	6.7	1.1	111.8
Average snowy days (≥ 0.2 cm)	11.6	9.0	6.5	3.5	0.3	0.0	0.0	0.0	0.1	2.0	6.3	13.0	52.2
Source: Environment Canada

== Demographics ==
In the 2021 Census of Population conducted by Statistics Canada, Dolbeau-Mistassini had a population of 13,718 living in 6,263 of its 6,866 total private dwellings, a change of −3.5% from its 2016 population of 14,212. With a land area of 293.43 km^{2} (113.29 sq mi), it had a population density of 46.8/km^{2} (121.1/sq mi) in 2021.

In 2021, the median age was 50.8, as opposed to 41.6 for all of Canada. French was the mother tongue of 99.0% of residents in 2021. The next most common mother tongues were English at 0.3%, followed by Haitian Creole and Spanish at 0.2%. 0.3% reported both English and French as their first language. Additionally there were 0.1% who reported both French and a non-official language as their mother tongue.

As of 2021, Indigenous peoples comprised 6.5% of the population, most of whom were Métis, and visible minorities contributed 1.4%. The largest visible minority groups in Dolbeau-Mistassini are Black (0.8%), Arab (0.2%), and Latin American (0.2%). The area is home to 35 recent immigrants (i.e. those arriving between 2016 and 2021), who comprise about 0.3% of the total population. 15 of them come from France.

In 2021, 79.1% of the population identified as Catholic, a 16.2% decrease from 2011, while 13.2% said they had no religious affiliation. Jehovah's Witnesses were the largest religious minority, making up 0.5% of the population. Muslims were the largest non-Christian religious minority, making up 0.2% of the population.

Counting both single and multiple responses, the most commonly identified ethnocultural ancestries were:

Ethnic origin	2021
Canadian	42.4%
French	21.1%
Québécois	15.1%
French Canadian	9.7%
First Nations	5.1%
Métis	3.1%
Irish	1.1%
Innu	1.0%

(Percentages may total more than 100% due to rounding and multiple responses).

Population trend:

- Population in 2021: 13,718 (2016 to 2021 population change: -3.5%)
- Population in 2016: 14,212
- Population in 2011: 14,384
- Population in 2006: 14,546
- Population in 2001: 14,879

== Economy ==
The main source of employment in Dolbeau is a paper mill factory. In June 2009, the mill was shut down but has since been restarted in August 2012. It is owned by Resolute Forest Products.

The environmental organization, SGE, outfits the town with town bicycles from St. Jean Baptiste to September. The green bicycles belong to the town so you can hop on one where ever and leave it for someone else somewhere else.

== Attractions ==
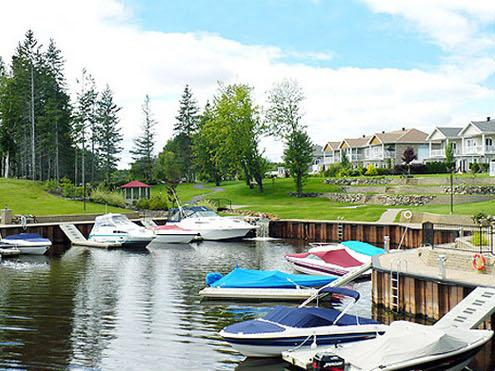
Marina in Dolbeau-Mistassini

The following are the attractions in Dolbeau-Mistassini:

- Do-Mi-Ski: local ski resort
- Festival Western
- Downtown Beaches and Beaches on the Lac-St-Jean shores
- Dolbeau-Saint-Félicien Airport
- Entrance of the Great Quebec north for hunting and fishing
- Rafting spots on the Mistassibi
- Festival of Stories (told at night) for the whole summer
- Festival du bleuet August

=== Blueberry Festival ===
A symbol of the Lac Saint-Jean region, the blueberry is celebrated during this festival every year between August 3 and 7. Festivities include exhibitions, animation, performances, giant games, blueberry contests, a parade by night, and the baking of a giant blueberry pie. It is celebrated in August, the month which blueberries are picked up in blueberry fields.
