= Rivière-Mistassini, Quebec =

Rivière-Mistassini
- Unorganized territory

- Location in Saguenay–Lac-Saint-Jean Quebec.
- Coordinates: 49°55′N 72°50′W
- Country: Canada
- Province: Quebec
- Region: Saguenay–Lac-Saint-Jean
- RCM: Maria-Chapdelaine
- Constituted: unspecified

Government
  - Federal riding: Lac-Saint-Jean
  - Prov. riding: Roberval

Area
  - Total: 18,753.80 km^{2} (7,240.88 sq mi)
  - Land: 17,629.74 km^{2} (6,806.88 sq mi)

Population (2021)
  - Total: 27
  - Density: 0/km^{2} (0/sq mi)
  - Pop (2016–21): ▼44.9%
  - Dwellings: 20
- Time zone: UTC-5 (EST)
  - Summer (DST): UTC-4 (EDT)
- Area codes: 418 and 581

Rivière-Mistassini (French pronunciation: [ʁivjɛʁ mistasini]) is an unorganized territory in the Canadian province of Quebec, located in the regional county municipality of Maria-Chapdelaine. The territory had a population of 27 as of the Canada 2021 Census, and covered a land area of 17,629.74 km^{2}.

The eponymous Mistassini River has its source in the far northern part of the territory and entirely bisects it from north to south.

== Demographics ==
Population trend:

- Population in 2021: 27 (2016 to 2021 population change: -44.9%)
- Population in 2016: 49
- Population in 2011: 31
- Population in 2006: 10
- Population in 2001: 0
- Population in 1996: 0
- Population in 1991: 0

Private dwellings occupied by usual residents: 16 (total dwellings: 20)
