= Maria-Chapdelaine Regional County Municipality =

Maria-Chapdelaine
- Regional county municipality
- Coordinates: 48°59′N 72°17′W
- Country: Canada
- Province: Quebec
- Region: Saguenay–Lac-Saint-Jean
- Effective: January 1, 1983
- County seat: Dolbeau-Mistassini

Government
  - Type: Prefecture
  - Prefect: Jean Morency

Area
  - Total: 38,056.70 km^{2} (14,693.77 sq mi)
  - Land: 36,768.21 km^{2} (14,196.29 sq mi)

Population (2021)
  - Total: 24,149
  - Density: 0.7/km^{2} (1.8/sq mi)
  - Change (2016-2021): ▼2.6
  - Dwellings: 12,185
- Time zone: UTC−5 (EST)
  - Summer (DST): UTC−4 (EDT)
- Area codes: 418 and 581
- Website: www.mrcdemaria-chapdelaine.ca

Maria-Chapdelaine is a regional county municipality in the Saguenay–Lac-Saint-Jean region of Quebec, Canada. Its seat is in Dolbeau-Mistassini.

It runs from Lac Saint-Jean in the south to the deep interior of northern Quebec in the north.

== Subdivisions ==
There are 15 subdivisions within the RCM:

Cities & Towns (2)

- Dolbeau-Mistassini
- Normandin

Municipalities (8)

- Albanel
- Girardville
- Notre-Dame-de-Lorette
- Péribonka
- Saint-Edmond-les-Plaines
- Saint-Eugène-d'Argentenay
- Saint-Stanislas
- Saint-Thomas-Didyme

Parishes (1)

- Saint-Augustin

Villages (1)

- Sainte-Jeanne-d'Arc

Unorganized Territory (3)

- Passes-Dangereuses
- Rivière-Mistassini
- Sainte-Élisabeth-de-Proulx

== Transportation ==
=== Access Routes ===
Highways and numbered routes that run through the municipality, including external routes that start or finish at the county border:

Autoroutes

- None

Principal Highways

- R-169

Secondary Highways

- R-373

External Routes

- None

== Demographics ==
In the 2021 Census of Population conducted by Statistics Canada, the RCM of Maria-Chapdelaine had a population of 24,149 living in 10,967 of its 12,185 total private dwellings, a change of -2.6% from its 2016 population of 24,793. With a land area of 35,501.49 km^{2} (13,707.20 sq mi), it had a population density of 0.7/km^{2} (1.8/sq mi) in 2021.

In 2021, the median age was 50.0, as opposed to 41.6 for all of Canada. French was the mother tongue of 99.0% of residents in 2021. The next most common mother tongues were the related languages of Atikamekw and Innu at 0.3% total, followed by English and Spanish at 0.3% each. 0.3% reported both English and French as their first language. Additionally there were 0.1% who reported both French and a non-official language as their mother tongue.

As of 2021, Indigenous peoples comprised 6.8% of the population, and visible minorities contributed 1.1%. The largest visible minority groups in the RCM of Maria-Chapdelaine are Black (0.5%), Arab (0.2%), and Latin American (0.2%).

In 2021, 79.1% of the population identified as Catholic, while 13.6% said they had no religious affiliation. Jehovah's Witnesses were the largest religious minority, making up 0.6% of the population. Muslims were the largest non-Christian religious minority, making up just over 0.1% of the population.

Counting both single and multiple responses, the most commonly identified ethnocultural ancestries were:

Ethnic origin	2021
Canadian	42.1%
French	21.0%
Québécois	15.4%
French Canadian	9.4%
First Nations	4.2%
Métis	2.7%
Irish	1.6%
Innu	1.2%
Acadian	1.0%

(Percentages may total more than 100% due to rounding and multiple responses).

== See also ==
- List of regional county municipalities and equivalent territories in Quebec
