= William Fradette =

Quebec politician

William Fradette MNA

Member of the National Assembly for Lac-Saint-Jean
- Incumbent
- Assumed office October 5, 2026
- Preceded by: Éric Girard

Personal details
- Party: Parti Québécois

William Fradette is a Canadian politician who is a candidate for the National Assembly of Quebec for Lac-Saint-Jean in the 2026 Quebec general election as a member of the Parti Québécois.

Prior to his election, Fradette was a journalist for the Journal Le Lac-St-Jean, the director of research for the parliamentary wing of the PQ, and an advisor to Lac-Saint-Jean MP Alexis Brunelle-Duceppe from 2019 to 2023. He was appointed Government Whip in 2026.

== Electoral record ==
2026 Quebec general election: Lac-Saint-Jean
** Preliminary results — Not yet official **
| Party | Candidate | Votes | % | ±% |
|---|---|---|---|---|
| Parti Québécois | William Fradette | 13,676 | 45.61 | +19.99 |
| Conservative | Tommy Gauthier | 6,688 | 22.30 | +10.93 |
| Coalition Avenir Québec | François Cormier | 4,549 | 15.17 | –36.30 |
| Liberal | Anne Pâquet | 2,716 | 9.06 | +6.04 |
| Québec solidaire | Antoine Bessette | 2,043 | 6.81 | –0.77 |
| Climat Québec | Sylvain Tremblay | 186 | 0.62 | +0.08 |
| Présence | Stefany Tremblay | 129 | 0.43 | N/A |
| Total valid votes | | 29,987 | 98.51 | +0.56 |
| Total rejected ballots | | 453 | 1.49 | –0.56 |
| Turnout | | 30,440 | 68.05 | +0.87 |
| Electors on the lists | | 44,732 | | |
| Parti Québécois gain from Coalition Avenir Québec | | Swing | | +4.53 |
Source: Élections Québec

2022 Quebec general election: Lac-Saint-Jean
| Party | Candidate | Votes | % | ±% |
|---|---|---|---|---|
| Coalition Avenir Québec | Éric Girard | 14,798 | 51.47 | +12.01 |
| Parti Québécois | William Fradette | 7,367 | 25.62 | –5.91 |
| Conservative | Luc Martel | 3,270 | 11.37 | +10.43 |
| Québec solidaire | Elsa Moulin | 2,178 | 7.58 | –7.27 |
| Liberal | Tricia Murray | 867 | 3.02 | –9.51 |
| Climat Québec | Martin Lavoie | 156 | 0.54 | New |
| Libertarian | Chantale Villeneuve | 116 | 0.40 | New |
| Total valid votes | | 28,752 | 97.95 | |
| Total rejected ballots | | 601 | 2.05 | +0.29 |
| Turnout | | 29,353 | 67.18 | –1.50 |
| Electors on the lists | | 43,691 | | |
| Coalition Avenir Québec hold | | Swing | | +8.96 |
Source: Élections Québec

2018 Quebec general election: Lac-Saint-Jean
| Party | Candidate | Votes | % | ±% |
|---|---|---|---|---|
| Coalition Avenir Québec | Éric Girard | 11,437 | 39.46 | +21.15 |
| Parti Québécois | William Fradette | 9,138 | 31.53 | -13 |
| Québec solidaire | Manon Girard | 4,305 | 14.85 | +8.52 |
| Liberal | Mathieu Huot | 3,630 | 12.53 | -15.67 |
| Conservative | Michael Grecoff | 272 | 0.94 | +0.14 |
| Équipe Autonomiste | Maude Gouin Huot | 199 | 0.69 | |
| Total valid votes | | 28,981 | 98.24 | |
| Total rejected ballots | | 518 | 1.76 | |
| Turnout | | 29,499 | 68.68 | |
| Eligible voters | | 42,954 | | |
| Coalition Avenir Québec gain from Parti Québécois | | Swing | | +17.08 |
Source(s) "Rapport des résultats officiels du scrutin". Élections Québec.
