= 2017 Lac-Saint-Jean federal by-election =

← 2015	October 23, 2017	2019 →

Riding of Lac-Saint-Jean
- Turnout: 41.61% (▼24.17%)
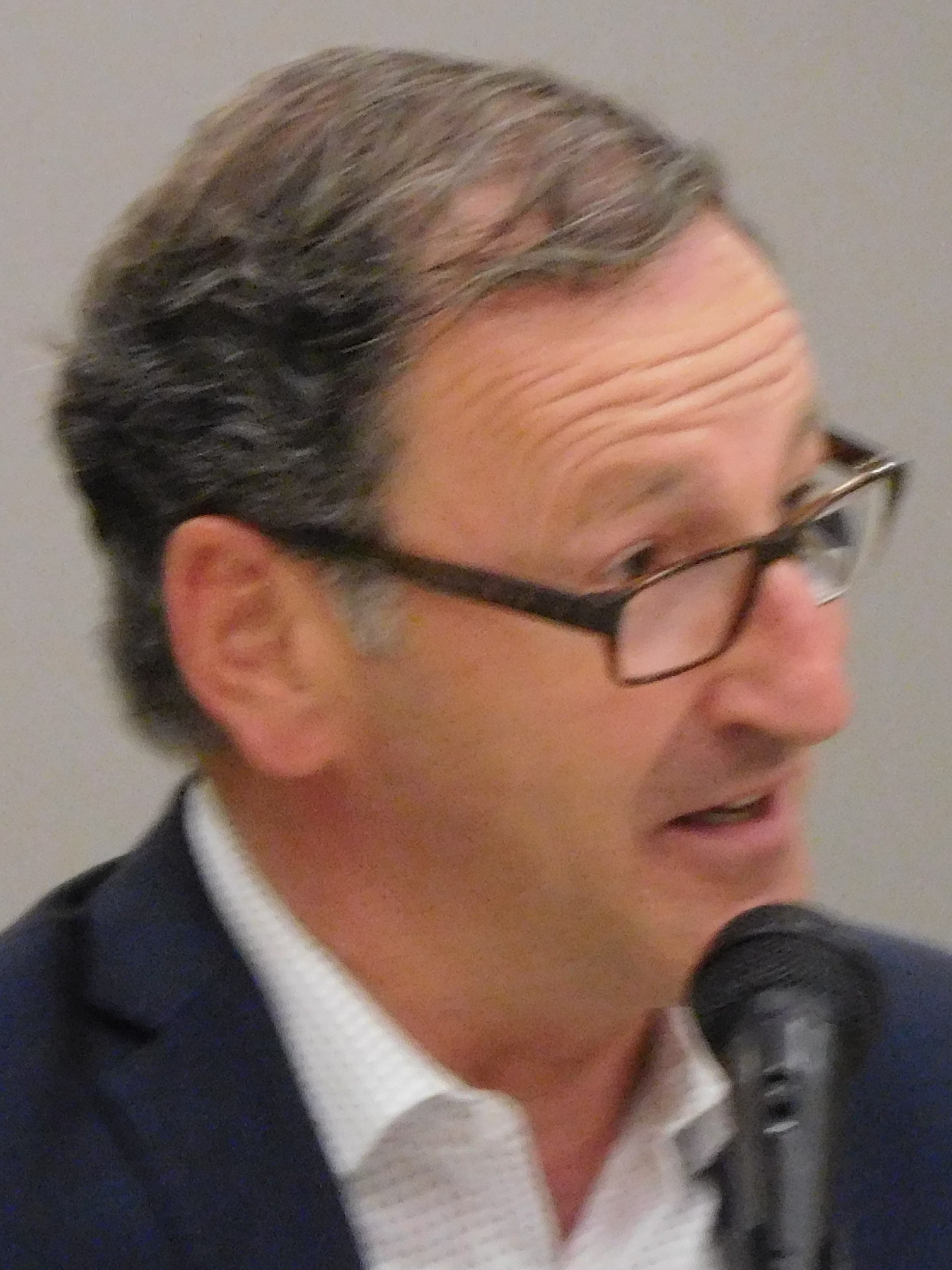
	First party	Second party
		CPC
Candidate	Richard Hébert	Rémy Leclerc
Party	Liberal	Conservative
Popular vote	13,442	8,710
Percentage	38.59%	25.01%
Swing	▲20.15%	▼8.26%
	Third party	Fourth party
	BQ	NDP
Candidate	Marc Maltais	Gisèle Dallaire
Party	Bloc Québécois	New Democratic
Popular vote	8,141	4,079
Percentage	23.37%	11.71%
Swing	▲5.00%	▼16.75%
MP before election
Denis Lebel
Conservative
Elected MP
Richard Hébert
Liberal

A by-election was held in the federal riding of Lac-Saint-Jean in the Quebec, Canada on 23 October 2017 following the resignation of Conservative MP Denis Lebel. The Deputy Leader of the Opposition announced in June 2017 that he would be stepping down from Parliament. The seat was gained by the Liberals by Richard Hébert on a huge swing, and a surprising gain from a governing party; similar to the one seen two months later in the South Surrey—White Rock federal by-election.

== Background ==
=== Constituency ===
Lac-Saint-Jean is a Francophone riding in the Saguenay–Lac-Saint-Jean region of northeast Quebec, and takes its name from the lake of the same name. The largest town in the riding is Alma.

=== Representation ===
The area was represented by Denis Lebel since 2007, who served as a minister in the Harper Cabinet. The seat was recreated for the 2015 general election, with Lebel being re-elected in a tight four-way marginal race.

What is now Lac-Saint-Jean was previously represented by the Bloc Québécois from 1993 to 2007 and, provincially, three of the area's five seats are held by the Parti Québécois, while the New Democratic Party was the runner-up in the riding in the past two elections.

== Campaign ==
The seat was vacated on August 9, 2017, due to the resignation of former Conservative cabinet minister and deputy leader of the Conservative Party, Denis Lebel. Lebel announced his decision to resign on June 19, 2017, saying that his resignation would take effect prior to the beginning of the fall session of parliament. He had been an MP for 10 years, representing Lac-Saint-Jean since its creation in 2015 and the former riding of Roberval—Lac-Saint-Jean from 2007 until 2015.

The warrant issued by the Speaker regarding the vacancy was received by the Chief Electoral Officer on August 9, 2017; under the Parliament of Canada Act the writ for a by-election had to be dropped no sooner than August 20, 2017, and no later than February 5, 2018 (11 and 180 days, respectively, from the warrant receipt date). On September 17, 2017, the writ was dropped for a by-election held on October 23, 2017.

Former Roberval city councillor Rémy Leclerc was acclaimed as the Conservative candidate on September 5. Saguenay Mayor Jean Tremblay was speculated to be a candidate for the Conservative nomination, but did not run as the nomination took place before his term as mayor was completed in November 2017.

Psychologist Gisèle Dallaire, the NDP's candidate in this riding in the 2015 election, was acclaimed as her party's candidate on September 25.

Dolbeau-Mistassini Mayor Richard Hébert defeated former Mashteuiatsh vice-chief Marjolaine Étienne for the Liberal nomination on September 7. Desbiens Mayor Nicolas Martel toyed with seeking the Liberal nomination, but ended up declining.

Union official Marc Maltais was named the Bloc Québécois candidate on September 26. Bloc leader Martine Ouellet, who does not have a seat in the House of Commons, ruled out standing as a candidate in the by-election as she is not from the Saguenay–Lac-Saint-Jean region.

Pianist Yves Laporte was named the Green Party candidate on September 28.

== Results ==
Canadian federal by-election, October 23, 2017: Lac-Saint-Jean Resignation of Denis Lebel
Party	Candidate	Votes	%	±%	Expenditures
Liberal	Richard Hébert	13,442	38.59	+20.15	
Conservative	Rémy Leclerc	8,710	25.01	−8.26	
Bloc Québécois	Marc Maltais	8,141	23.37	+5.00	
New Democratic	Gisèle Dallaire	4,079	11.71	−16.75	
Green	Yves Laporte	457	1.31	−0.15	
Total valid votes/Expense limit		34,829	98.67		$133,786.71
Total rejected ballots		469	1.33		
Turnout		35,298	41.61		
Eligible voters		84,829			
Liberal gain from Conservative		Swing		+14.20	
Source: Elections Canada

== 2015 results ==
2015 Canadian federal election
Party	Candidate	Votes	%	±%	Expenditures
Conservative	Denis Lebel	18,393	33.27	-8.99	$144,196.85
New Democratic	Gisèle Dallaire	15,735	28.46	-3.67	$90,827.25
Liberal	Sabin Simard	10,193	18.44	+15.19	$8,743.01
Bloc Québécois	Sabin Gaudreault	10,152	18.37	-2.64	$31,823.52
Green	Laurence Requilé	806	1.46	+0.12	–
Total valid votes/Expense limit		55,279	98.35		$278,724.96
Total rejected ballots		925	1.65	–	
Turnout		56,204	65.78	–	
Eligible voters		85,445			
Conservative notional hold		Swing		-2.66	
Source: Elections Canada

== See also ==
- By-elections to the 42nd Canadian Parliament
