= Pierre-Léandre Marcotte =

Canadian politician

Pierre-Léandre Marcotte (French pronunciation: [pjɛʁ leɑ̃dʁ maʁkɔt]; October 5, 1837 – June 16, 1899) was a farmer and political figure in Quebec. He represented Lac-Saint-Jean in the Legislative Assembly of Quebec from 1890 to 1892 as a Liberal.

He was born in Cap-Santé, Lower Canada, the son of Pierre-Moïse Marcotte and Esther Richard. Marcotte owned a farm at Saint-Bruno. He was secretary-treasurer for Saint-Bruno from 1885 to 1896 and Indian agent at Pointe-Bleue from 1896 to 1899. Marcotte also served as president of the agricultural society for Lac-Saint-Jean County. He was an unsuccessful candidate for a seat in the Quebec assembly in an 1888 by-election. Marcotte was defeated when he ran for reelection in 1892. He was married twice: to Zénaïde de Tilly in 1874 and to Mathilde Gauvin in 1879. Marcotte died at Pointe-Bleue at the age of 61 and was buried in Saint-Bruno.
