= Marcel Lessard =

Canadian politician (1926–2023)

The Honourable Marcel Lessard PC
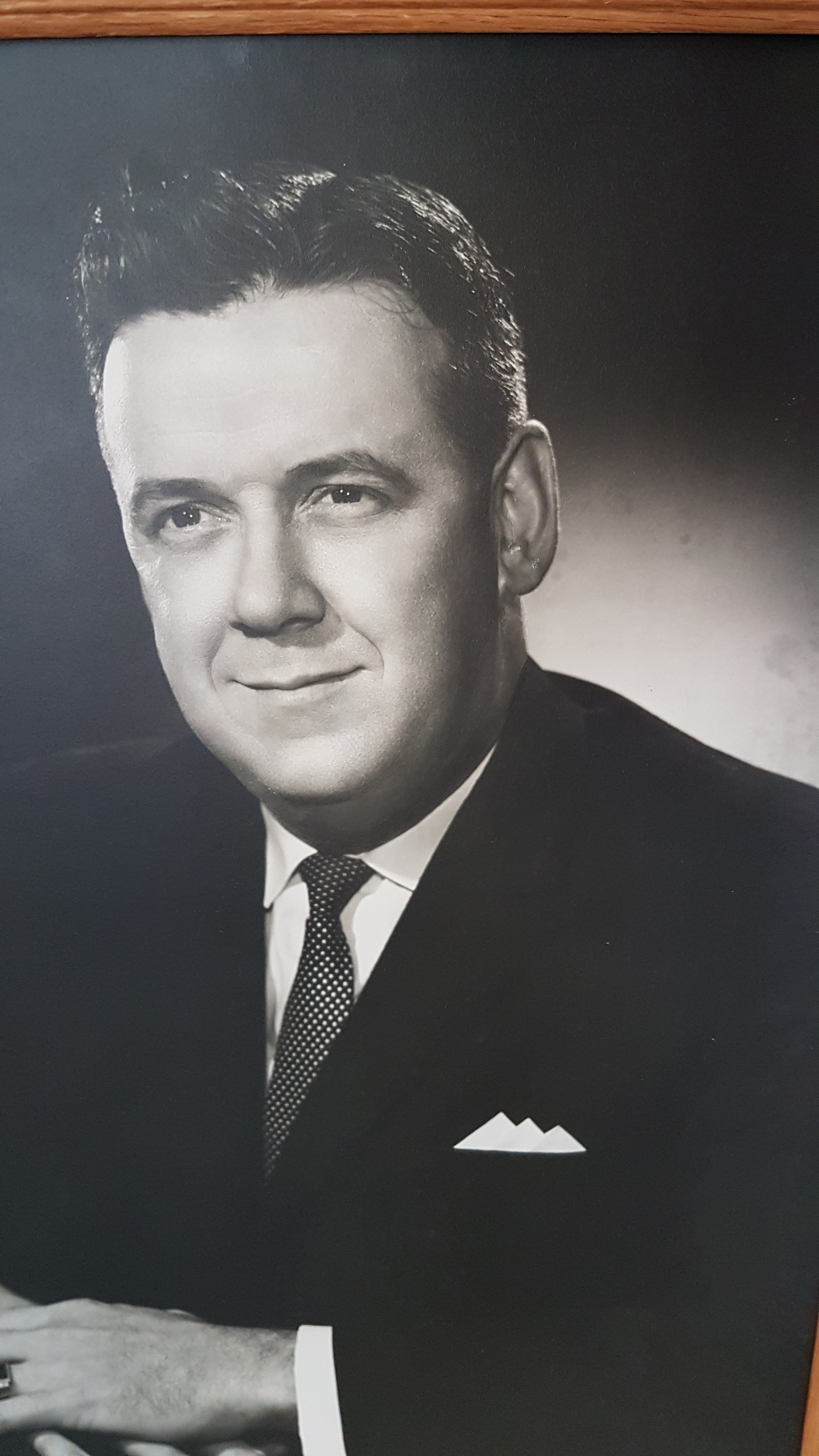
- Lessard in the 1960s

Member of Parliament for Lac-Saint-Jean
- In office 1968–1980
- Preceded by: Alcide Simard
- Succeeded by: Pierre Gimaïel
- In office 1962–1965
- Preceded by: Roger Parizeau
- Succeeded by: Alcide Simard

Personal details
- Born: August 14, 1926 Alma, Quebec, Canada
- Died: November 19, 2023 (aged 97) Quebec City, Quebec, Canada
- Party: Social Credit (until 1965); Liberal (after 1968)
- Spouse: Yvette Jean

Marcel Lessard, PC (August 14, 1926 – November 19, 2023) was a Canadian politician.

Lessard was first elected to the House of Commons of Canada as the Social Credit Member of Parliament (MP) for Lac-Saint-Jean, Quebec as part of Réal Caouette's breakthrough in the province in the 1962 election. He was re-elected in the 1963 election.

The Social Credit Party split soon after along English and French lines, however, Lessard declined to join the majority of Social Credit's Quebec MPs who followed Caouette into the Ralliement Créditiste and remained with the Alberta-based Social Credit Party led by Robert Thompson for the rest of the parliamentary term.

During the 1964 Great Flag Debate, Lessard was a member of the parliamentary committee that recommended the adoption of the Maple Leaf flag.

In the 1965 federal election, he ran as an independent candidate and was defeated by the Ralliement Créditiste candidate.

Lessard returned to the House in the 1968 election as a Liberal. In 1970, Lessard became parliamentary secretary to the Minister of Agriculture. In 1975, he was appointed to the Cabinet as Minister of Regional Economic Expansion. He remained in that position until the 1979 election that defeated the Liberal government. Lessard retained his seat, and joined the Liberals on the Opposition benches. He retired from politics at the 1980 federal election.

Lessard died at Hôpital Saint-François d'Assise in Quebec City on November 19, 2023, at the age of 97.
