= Roger Pilote =

Canadian politician

Member of the National Assembly of Quebec for Lac-Saint-Jean
- In office 1970–1976
- Preceded by: Joseph-Léonce Desmeules
- Succeeded by: Jacques Brassard

Personal details
- Born: March 4, 1934 Saint-Nazaire, Quebec, Canada
- Died: January 6, 2023 (aged 88) Métabetchouan–Lac-à-la-Croix, Quebec Canada
- Party: Quebec Liberal Party
- Education: Université de Sherbrooke

Roger Pilote (March 4, 1934—January 6, 2023) was a Canadian politician. He served as the member of the National Assembly of Quebec for the riding of Lac-Saint-Jean from 1970 to 1976 as a member of the Quebec Liberal Party.

Pilote was born on March 4, 1934, in Saint-Nazaire, Quebec and attended primary schooling there. He later attended Université de Sherbrooke. He served as an associate professor of accounting at l'École de commerce de Chicoutimi from 1961 to 1968 and at l'Université du Québec à Chicoutimi from 1968 to 1969.

Pilote was a Liberal member of the National Assembly of Quebec for Lac-Saint-Jean from 1970 until his defeat in the 1976 election.

Pilote died January 6, 2023, in Métabetchouan–Lac-à-la-Croix, Quebec.
