= André Gauthier =

André Gauthier may refer to:

- André Gauthier (politician)
- André Gauthier (sculptor)
