= Alexandre Cloutier =

Canadian politician and lawyer (born 1977)

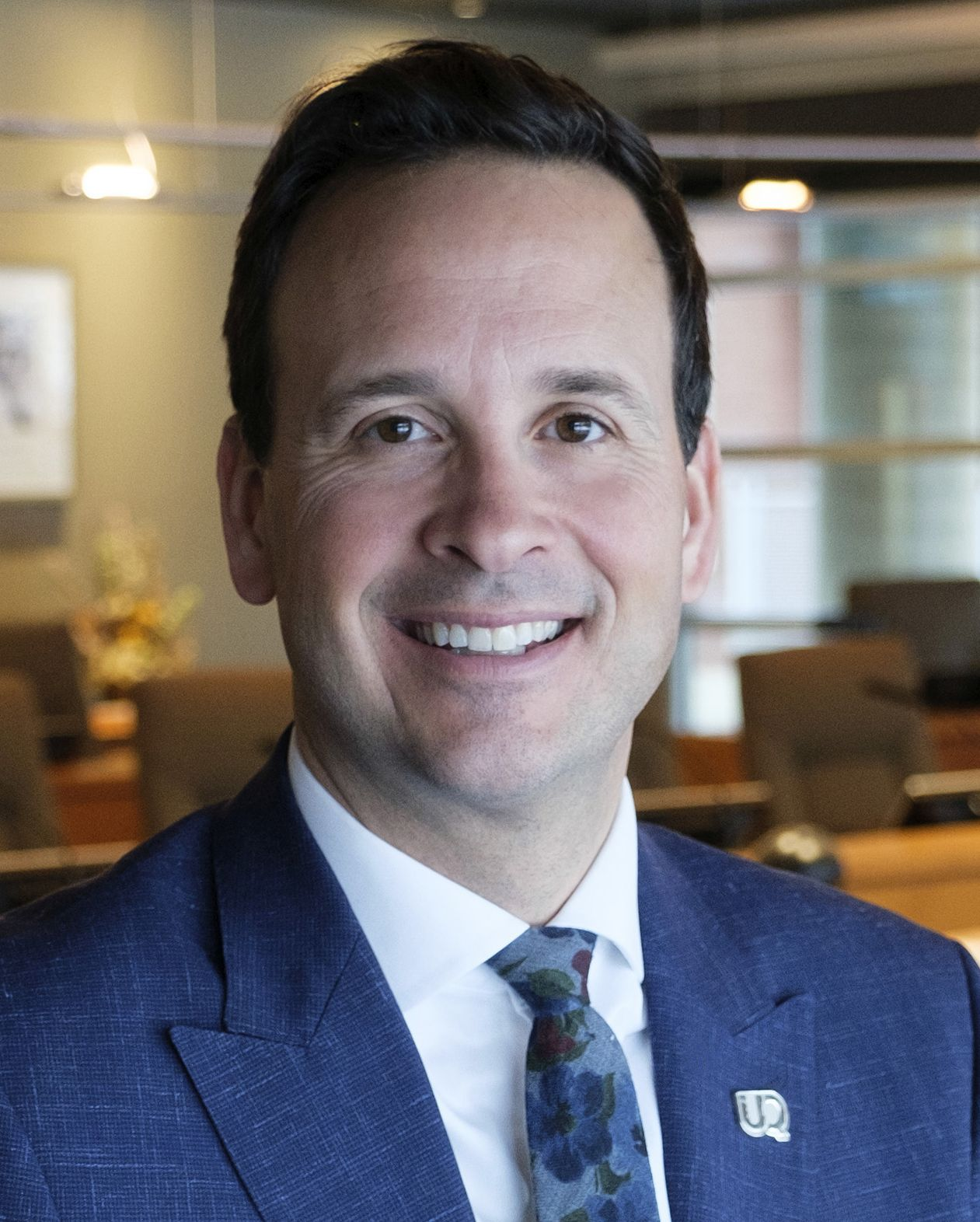
- Cloutier in 2023

Member of the National Assembly of Quebec for Lac-Saint-Jean
- In office March 26, 2007 – October 1, 2018
- Preceded by: Stéphan Tremblay
- Succeeded by: Éric Girard

Personal details
- Born: September 1, 1977 (age 48) Chicoutimi, Quebec
- Party: Parti Québécois
- Spouse: Marie-Claude Perron
- Profession: lawyer

Alexandre Cloutier (born September 1, 1977) is a Canadian politician and lawyer. He was a member of National Assembly of Quebec for the riding of Lac-Saint-Jean in the Saguenay–Lac-Saint-Jean region from 2007 to 2018, representing the Parti Québécois.

== Biography ==
Cloutier holds an IB Diploma from the Petit Séminaire de Québec, a bachelor's degree in law from the University of Ottawa, a master's degree in constitutional law from the Université de Montréal, and a master's degree in public international law from the University of Cambridge.

Prior to beginning his career he worked at the Supreme Court of Canada as a clerk for Justice Charles Gonthier. He became a member of the Barreau du Québec in 2002 and thereafter worked variously as a lawyer and lecturer at the University of Ottawa. He also acted as a political aide to both the former federal MP for Lac-Saint-Jean-Saguenay in 2000 and to his Lac-Saint-Jean MNA and predecessor Stéphan Tremblay in 2006.

Cloutier was elected as the riding's MNA in the 2007 elections in which he defeated the Liberal Party candidate Yves Bolduc. He was named the PQ's critic in research and development by leader André Boisclair. After Pauline Marois' nomination as the new leader of the PQ, he was named the critic for Canadian intergovernmental affairs.

In Pauline Marois' 2012–2014 government he held cabinet posts as the Minister responsible for the Nord-du-Québec region and subsequently as the Minister for Canadian Intergovernmental Affairs, the Canadian Francophonie and Sovereignist Governance.

He stood as a candidate in the 2015 and 2016 Parti Québécois leadership elections. He lost on both occasions.
