= Paul-Henri Spence =

Canadian politician

Member of the Canadian Parliament for Roberval
- In office 1952–1953
- Preceded by: Joseph-Alfred Dion
- Succeeded by: Georges Villeneuve

Member of the Legislative Assembly of Quebec for Roberval
- In office 1956–1958
- Preceded by: Antoine Marcotte
- Succeeded by: Jean-Joseph Turcotte

Personal details
- Born: November 9, 1906 Roberval, Quebec
- Died: May 29, 1994 (aged 87) Quebec City, Quebec
- Party: Progressive Conservative
- Other political affiliations: Union Nationale

Paul-Henri Spence (November 9, 1906 – May 29, 1994) was a Quebec businessman and politician.

Spence was born in Roberval, Quebec and was an accountant by training.

He was elected to the House of Commons of Canada in a 1952 by-election in Roberval's federal constituency to become only the third Progressive Conservative MP from Quebec to sit in the 21st Canadian Parliament. He only sat in Parliament for a year before he lost his seat in the 1953 general election with Liberal Georges Villeneuve defeating him by just over 200 votes.

Spence moved to provincial politics and was elected to the Legislative Assembly of Quebec in the 1956 provincial election as the Union Nationale deputy for provincial Roberval district. He sat in the legislature for two years before resigning his seat in the 25th Legislative Assembly of Quebec on August 19, 1958.

He subsequently served as mayor of Saint-Félicien, Quebec from 1969 until 1973.

In his business life, Spence was an accountant by training working in the energy and pulp and paper industries. In 1955 he founded Paul Spence, Inc., an industrial supply company which he owned until 1980 and remained a major shareholder in until 1987.
