= Éric Girard (Lac-Saint-Jean MNA) =

Canadian politician

Member of the National Assembly of Quebec for Lac-Saint-Jean
- In office October 1, 2018 – August 27, 2026
- Preceded by: Alexandre Cloutier
- Succeeded by: William Fradette

Personal details
- Born: 1970 (age 55–56) Alma, Quebec, Canada
- Party: Coalition Avenir Québec

Éric Girard (born 1970) is a Canadian politician, who was elected to the National Assembly of Quebec in the 2018 provincial election. He represented the electoral district of Lac-Saint-Jean as a member of the Coalition Avenir Québec. He did not seek re-election in the 2026 general election.

Girard served on the municipal council of Saint-Nazaire, Quebec from 1998 to 2002 and as mayor from 2002 to 2009.

== Electoral record ==
2022 Quebec general election: Lac-Saint-Jean
Party	Candidate	Votes	%	±%
Coalition Avenir Québec	Éric Girard	14,798	51.47	+12.01
Parti Québécois	William Fradette	7,367	25.62	–5.91
Conservative	Luc Martel	3,270	11.37	+10.43
Québec solidaire	Elsa Moulin	2,178	7.58	–7.27
Liberal	Tricia Murray	867	3.02	–9.51
Climat Québec	Martin Lavoie	156	0.54	New
Libertarian	Chantale Villeneuve	116	0.40	New
Total valid votes		28,752	97.95	
Total rejected ballots		601	2.05	+0.29
Turnout		29,353	67.18	–1.50
Electors on the lists		43,691		
Coalition Avenir Québec hold		Swing		+8.96
Source: Élections Québec

2018 Quebec general election: Lac-Saint-Jean
Party	Candidate	Votes	%	±%
Coalition Avenir Québec	Éric Girard	11,437	39.46	+21.15
Parti Québécois	William Fradette	9,138	31.53	-13
Québec solidaire	Manon Girard	4,305	14.85	+8.52
Liberal	Mathieu Huot	3,630	12.53	-15.67
Conservative	Michael Grecoff	272	0.94	+0.14
Équipe Autonomiste	Maude Gouin Huot	199	0.69	
Total valid votes		28,981	98.24	
Total rejected ballots		518	1.76	
Turnout		29,499	68.68	
Eligible voters		42,954		
Coalition Avenir Québec gain from Parti Québécois		Swing		+17.08
Source(s) "Rapport des résultats officiels du scrutin". Élections Québec.
