= Alcide Simard =

Canadian politician

Joseph Alcide Simard
- Official 1966 portrait

Member of Parliament for Lac-Saint-Jean
- In office November 1965 – April 1968

Personal details
- Born: 25 October 1907 Saint-Léonard, Quebec, Canada
- Died: 21 December 1984 (aged 77) Lac-Bouchette, Quebec, Canada
- Profession: life insurance agent

Joseph Alcide Simard (25 October 1907 – 21 December 1984) was a Canadian businessman and politician. Simard was a Ralliement créditiste member of the House of Commons of Canada.

Born in Saint-Léonard, Quebec, he was a life insurance agent by career. He was first elected at the Lac-Saint-Jean riding in the 1965 general election. After his only term in Parliament, Simard was defeated at Lac-Saint-Jean in the 1968 election by Marcel Lessard of the Liberal party.
