= Saint Bruno =

Saint Bruno or Saint-Bruno may refer to:

Roman Catholic saints

- Bruno, Duke of Saxony (c. 880) one of the Martyrs of Ebsdorf
- Bruno the Great (925–965), German Archbishop of Cologne and Duke of Lotharingia
- Bruno of Querfurt (c. 974–1009), German missionary bishop and martyr
- Bruno (bishop of Würzburg) (c. 1005–1045), Imperial Chancellor of Italy and later Prince-Bishop of Würzburg
- Bruno of Cologne (c. 1030–1101), German founder of the Carthusian Order
- Bruno (bishop of Segni) (c. 1047–1123), Italian Bishop of Segni and Abbot of Montecassino

Places:

- Saint-Bruno, Quebec, Canada, a neighborhood within Hébertville
- Mont Saint-Bruno, Quebec, a mountain
- Saint-Bruno (AMT), a railway station in Saint-Bruno-de-Montarville, Quebec

== See also ==
- Carthusian Order or Order of Saint Bruno, a Roman Catholic religious order
- Saint-Bruno-de-Guigues, Quebec, a municipality
- Saint-Bruno-de-Kamouraska, Quebec, a municipality
- Saint-Bruno-de-Montarville, Quebec, a suburb of Montreal
- San Bruno (disambiguation)
