= Joseph-Léonard Duguay =

Canadian politician

Member of the Canadian Parliament for Lake St. John
- In office 1930–1935
- Preceded by: Armand Sylvestre
- Succeeded by: Electoral district was abolished in 1933

Member of the Legislative Assembly of Quebec for Lac-Saint-Jean
- In office 1935–1939
- Preceded by: Joseph-Ludger Fillion
- Succeeded by: Joseph-Ludger Fillion

Personal details
- Born: October 8, 1900 Pabos, Quebec
- Died: December 3, 1946 (aged 46) Montreal, Quebec
- Party: Conservative

Joseph-Léonard Duguay (October 8, 1900 – December 3, 1946) was a politician from Quebec, Canada and a Member of the House of Commons of Canada and the Legislative Assembly of Quebec. He died on December 3, 1946, in Montreal.

== Background ==
He was born in Pabos, Gaspésie–Îles-de-la-Madeleine on October 8, 1900, and became a dentist after graduating from the University of Montreal. He married Gertrude Duhamel in Montreal in 1928.

== Political career ==
Duguay ran as a Conservative candidate in the federal district of Lake St. John in the 1930 election and won. He was defeated by Liberal candidate Armand Sylvestre in the district of Lake St-John—Roberval in the 1935 election.

Duguay ran as a Conservative candidate in the provincial district of Lac-Saint-Jean in 1935 election and won against Liberal incumbent Joseph-Ludger Fillion. He joined Maurice Duplessis's Union Nationale and was re-elected in the 1936 election.

He was defeated in the 1939 election.

From 1938 to 1940, Duguay served as Mayor of Alma, Saguenay-Lac-Saint-Jean.

Duguay tried to win back his seat at the Canadian House of Commons, but was defeated in the 1940 and again when he ran as an independent in the 1945 elections.
