= Richard Hébert =

Canadian politician

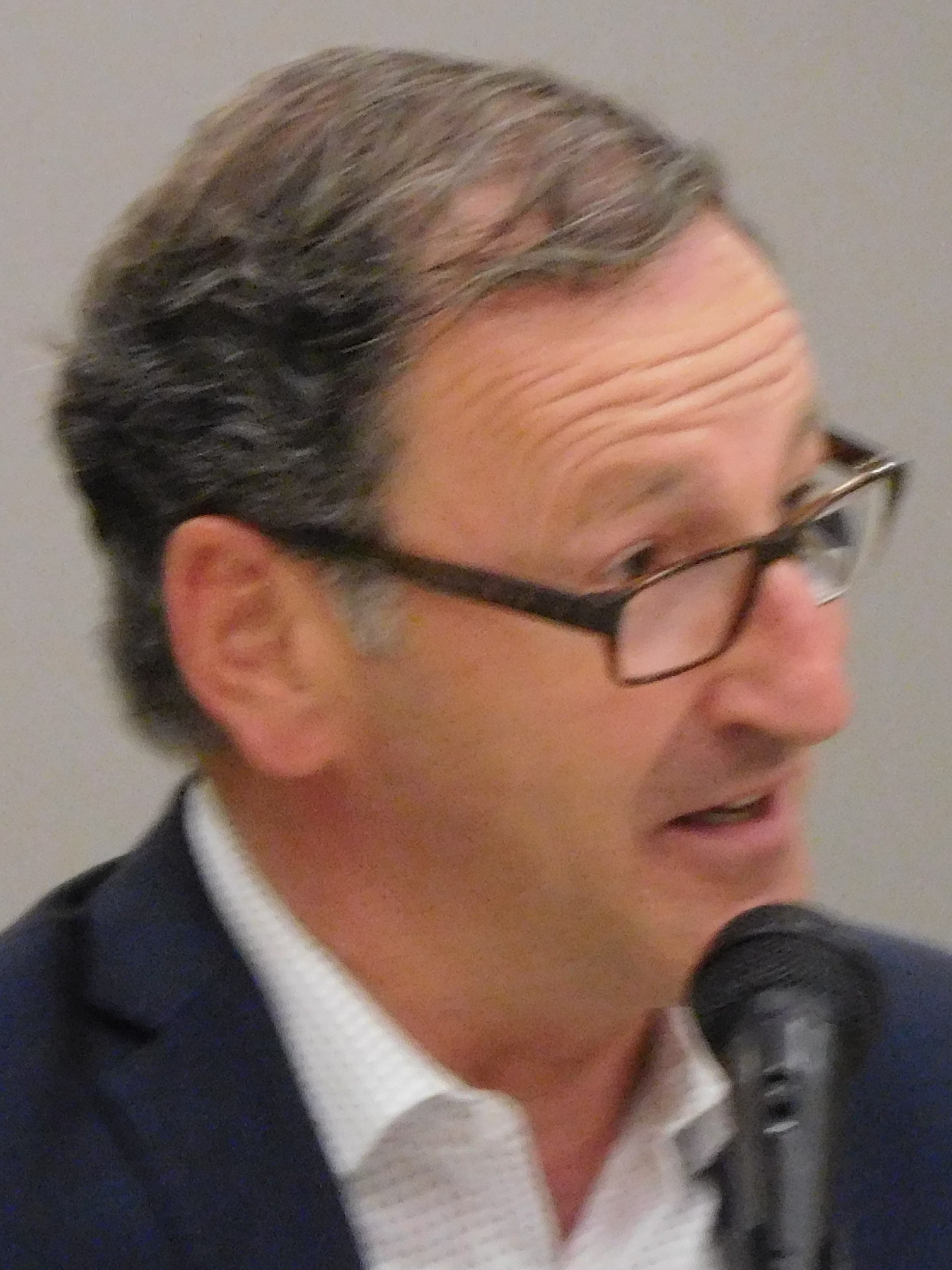

Member of Parliament for Lac-Saint-Jean
- In office October 23, 2017 – September 11, 2019
- Preceded by: Denis Lebel
- Succeeded by: Alexis Brunelle-Duceppe

Personal details
- Born: Dolbeau-Mistassini, Quebec
- Party: Liberal

Richard Hébert is a Canadian politician who served as the Member of Parliament for the riding of Lac-Saint-Jean in the House of Commons of Canada from his election in a 2017 by-election until his defeat in the 2019 federal election. He served as a member of the Liberal Party of Canada.

Prior to his election to Parliament, Hébert was the mayor of Dolbeau-Mistassini since November 2013.

== Electoral record ==
2019 Canadian federal election: Lac-Saint-Jean
Party	Candidate	Votes	%	±%	Expenditures
Bloc Québécois	Alexis Brunelle-Duceppe	23,839	43.96	+20.59	$33,354.37
Liberal	Richard Hébert	13,633	25.14	-13.45	$83,673.06
Conservative	Jocelyn Fradette	12,544	23.13	-1.88	$41,607.93
New Democratic	Jean-Simon Fortin	2,753	5.08	-6.63	none listed
Green	Julie Gagnon-Bond	1,010	1.86	+0.55	$0.00
People's	Dany Boudreault	448	0.9	New	none listed
Total valid votes/expense limit		53,971	97.87		
Total rejected ballots		1,155	2.13		
Turnout		55,382	63.9		
Eligible voters		84,456			
Bloc Québécois gain from Liberal		Swing		+17.02	
Source: Elections Canada

Canadian federal by-election, October 23, 2017: Lac-Saint-Jean Resignation of Denis Lebel
Party	Candidate	Votes	%	±%	
Liberal	Richard Hébert	13,442	38.6		
Conservative	Rémy Leclerc	8,710	25.0		
Bloc Québécois	Marc Maltais	8,141	23.4		
New Democratic	Gisèle Dallaire	4,079	11.7		
Green	Yves Laporte	457	1.3		
Total valid votes/Expense limit		34,829	98.67		$133,786.71
Total rejected ballots		469	1.33		
Turnout		35,298	41.61		
Eligible voters		84,829			
