= Jean-Noël Tremblay =

Canadian politician (1926–2020)

Member of the Canadian Parliament for Roberval
- In office 1958–1962
- Preceded by: Georges Villeneuve
- Succeeded by: Charles-Arthur Gauthier

Member of the National Assembly of Quebec for Chicoutimi
- In office 1966–1973
- Preceded by: Antonio Talbot
- Succeeded by: Marc-André Bédard

Personal details
- Born: 7 June 1926 Saint-André-du-Lac-Saint-Jean, Quebec, Canada
- Died: 23 January 2020 (aged 93) Quebec, Quebec, Canada
- Party: Progressive Conservative
- Other political affiliations: Union Nationale
- Cabinet: Provincial: Minister of Cultural Affairs (1966-1970)

Jean-Noël Tremblay, CM (French pronunciation: [ʒɑ̃ nɔɛl tʁɑ̃blɛ]; 7 June 1926 – 23 January 2020) was a Canadian politician, who made career at both the federal and the provincial levels.

== Member of Parliament ==
Tremblay was elected to the House of Commons of Canada in the 1958 election representing the Quebec riding of Roberval and was a member of the Progressive Conservative Party. He lost re-election in 1962, when for the first time the Social Credit Party made a significant breakthrough in Quebec.

== Provincial politics ==
He won a seat to the National Assembly of Quebec, representing Chicoutimi, in 1966 and was a member of the Union Nationale. From 1966 to 1970, Tremblay was the Minister of Cultural Affairs in the cabinets of Daniel Johnson, Sr and Jean-Jacques Bertrand. He was known in this period as a vocal Quebec nationalist.

Tremblay supported Jean-Guy Cardinal over Jean-Jacques Bertrand during the party's leadership convention, held on June 21, 1969.

He was re-elected to the legislature in 1970, but was defeated in 1973.

== Personal life ==
Tremblay was born in June 1926 in Saint-André-du-Lac-Saint-Jean, Quebec. He died in January 2020 at the age of 93 in Quebec, Quebec.

== Honors ==
In 1990, he was made a Member of the Order of Canada.
