= Armand Sylvestre (MP) =

Canadian politician

Member of the Canadian Parliament for Lake St. John
- In office 1925–1930
- Preceded by: Riding created in 1924
- Succeeded by: Joseph-Léonard Duguay

Member of the Canadian Parliament for Lake St-John—Roberval
- In office 1935–1945
- Preceded by: Riding created in 1933
- Succeeded by: Joseph-Alfred Dion

Personal details
- Born: May 15, 1890 Quebec City, Quebec, Canada
- Died: March 3, 1972 (aged 81)
- Party: Liberal
- Relations: Louis Sylvestre, grandfather

Joseph-Ernest-Armand Sylvestre (May 15, 1890 – March 3, 1972) was a lawyer and political figure in Quebec, Canada. He represented Lake St. John from 1925 to 1930 and Lake St-John—Roberval from 1935 to 1945 in the House of Commons of Canada as a Liberal member.

He was born in Quebec City, the grandson of Louis Sylvestre. Sylvestre was first elected to the House of Commons in the 1925 federal election and reelected in 1926. He was defeated by Joseph-Léonard Duguay when he ran for reelection in 1930. Sylvestre defeated Duguay in the newly formed riding of Lake St-John—Roberval in 1935 and again in 1940.
