= Roberval—Lac-Saint-Jean =

Former federal electoral district in Quebec, Canada

Coordinates: 49.37°N 73.70°W

Quebec electoral district
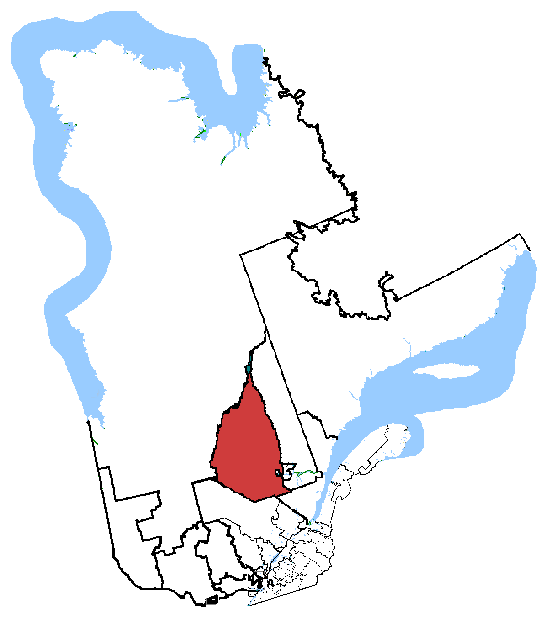
- Roberval—Lac-Saint-Jean in relation to other Quebec federal electoral districts

Defunct federal electoral district
- Legislature: House of Commons
- District created: 1947
- District abolished: 2013
- First contested: 1949
- Last contested: 2011
- District webpage: profile, map

Demographics
- Population (2011): 78,765
- Electors (2011): 63,240
- Area (km²): 57,155.64
- Census division(s): Le Domaine-du-Roy, Maria-Chapdelaine, Lac-Saint-Jean-Est
- Census subdivision(s): Dolbeau-Mistassini, Roberval, Saint-Félicien, Métabetchouan–Lac-à-la-Croix, Normandin, Saint-Prime, Hébertville, Saint-Bruno, Albanel

Roberval—Lac-Saint-Jean (French pronunciation: [ʁɔbɛʁval lak sɛ̃ ʒɑ̃]; formerly known as Roberval) was a federal electoral district in Quebec, Canada, that represented in the House of Commons of Canada from 1949 until 2015.

The riding was created in 1947 from parts of Lake St-John—Roberval riding. It was dissolved into Lac-Saint-Jean and Jonquière during the 2012 electoral redistribution.

The neighbouring ridings are Abitibi—Baie-James—Nunavik—Eeyou, Chicoutimi—Le Fjord, Jonquière—Alma, Montmorency—Charlevoix—Haute-Côte-Nord, and Saint-Maurice—Champlain.

This is the riding with the highest percentage of non-immigrants (99.4%) and of people with French as their home language (also 99.4%).

== Members of Parliament ==
This riding has elected the following members of Parliament:

Parliament	Years	Member	Party
Roberval; Riding created from Lake St-John—Roberval
21st	1949–1952	Joseph-Alfred Dion	Liberal
21st	1952–1953	Paul-Henri Spence	Progressive Conservative
22nd	1953–1957	Georges Villeneuve	Liberal
23rd	1957–1958	Georges Villeneuve	Liberal
24th	1958–1962	Jean-Noël Tremblay	Progressive Conservative
25th	1962–1963	Charles-Arthur Gauthier	Social Credit
26th	1963–1963	Charles-Arthur Gauthier	Social Credit
26th	1963–1965	Charles-Arthur Gauthier	Ralliement créditiste
27th	1965–1968	Charles-Arthur Gauthier	Ralliement créditiste
28th	1968–1971	Charles-Arthur Gauthier	Ralliement créditiste
28th	1971–1972	Charles-Arthur Gauthier	Social Credit
29th	1972–1974	Charles-Arthur Gauthier	Social Credit
30th	1974–1979	Charles-Arthur Gauthier	Social Credit
31st	1979–1980	Charles-Arthur Gauthier	Social Credit
32nd	1980–1984	Suzanne Beauchamp-Niquet	Liberal
33rd	1984–1988	Benoît Bouchard	Progressive Conservative
34th	1988–1993	Benoît Bouchard	Progressive Conservative
35th	1993–1997	Michel Gauthier	Bloc Québécois
36th	1997–2000	Michel Gauthier	Bloc Québécois
37th	2000–2004	Michel Gauthier	Bloc Québécois
38th	2004–2006	Michel Gauthier	Bloc Québécois
Roberval—Lac-Saint-Jean
39th	2006–2007	Michel Gauthier	Bloc Québécois
39th	2007–2008	Denis Lebel	Conservative
40th	2008–2011	Denis Lebel	Conservative
41st	2011–2015	Denis Lebel	Conservative
Riding dissolved into Lac-Saint-Jean and Jonquière

== Election results ==
=== Roberval—Lac-Saint-Jean, 2004 – 2015 ===
2011 Canadian federal election
Party	Candidate	Votes	%	±%	Expenditures
Conservative	Denis Lebel	18,438	45.68	+2.13	$99,662
New Democratic	Yvon Guay	11,182	27.70	+22.99	$1,983
Bloc Québécois	Claude Pilote	8,577	21.25	-18.40	$70,809
Liberal	Bernard Garneau	1,615	4.00	-6.09	$5,913
Green	Steeve Simard	553	1.37	-0.63	–
Total valid votes/expense limit		40,365	98.79		$102,172
Total rejected ballots		494	1.21	+0.04	
Turnout		40,859	64.20	+5.21	
Eligible voters		63,645			
Conservative hold		Swing		-10.43	

2008 Canadian federal election
Party	Candidate	Votes	%	±%	Expenditures
Conservative	Denis Lebel	16,055	43.54	-16.13	$88,243
Bloc Québécois	Claude Pilote	14,619	39.65	+12.89	$79,101
Liberal	Bernard Garneau	3,721	10.09	+0.54	$9,041
New Democratic	Catherine Forbes	1,738	4.71	+2.41	–
Green	Jocelyn Tremblay	737	2.00	+0.29	–
Total valid votes/expense limit		36,870	98.83		$98,690
Total rejected ballots		437	1.17	+0.27	
Turnout		37,307	58.99	+12.16	
Eligible voters		63,240			
Conservative hold		Swing		-14.51	

Change is from by-election

Canadian federal by-election, 17 September 2007
Party	Candidate	Votes	%	±%	Expenditures
Conservative	Denis Lebel	17,463	59.68	+22.50	$95,449
Bloc Québécois	Céline Houde	7,830	26.76	-18.45	$93,915
Liberal	Louise Boulanger	2,795	9.55	+1.80	$51,293
New Democratic	Éric Dubois	675	2.31	-3.22	$3,123
Green	Jean-Luc Boily	499	1.71	-2.64	–
Total valid votes/expense limit		29,262	99.10		$95,677
Total rejected ballots		265	0.90	-0.11	
Turnout		29,527	46.83	-15.32	
Eligible voters		63,050			
Conservative gain from Bloc Québécois		Swing		+20.47	

2006 Canadian federal election
Party	Candidate	Votes	%	±%	Expenditures
Bloc Québécois	Michel Gauthier	17,586	45.20	-14.21	$57,312
Conservative	Ghislain Lavoie	14,463	37.18	+28.52	$12,647
Liberal	Luc Chiasson	3,014	7.75	-15.45	$9,150
New Democratic	François Privé	2,151	5.53	+0.42	$936
Green	Sébastien Girard	1,689	4.34	+0.72	$719
Total valid votes/expense limit		38,903	98.99		$91,857
Total rejected ballots		397	1.01	-0.93	
Turnout		39,300	62.15	+6.31	
Eligible voters		63,236			
Bloc Québécois hold		Swing		-21.36	

=== Roberval, 1947 – 2004 ===
2004 Canadian federal election
Party	Candidate	Votes	%	±%	Expenditures
Bloc Québécois	Michel Gauthier (incumbent)	20,655	59.41	+1.78	$54,905
Liberal	Michel Mallette	8,064	23.19	-9.20	$52,574
Conservative	Ghislain Lavoie	3,011	8.66	+0.77	$10,049
New Democratic	Isabelle Tremblay	1,777	5.11	+3.77	$895
Green	Marc-André Gauthier	1,260	3.62		$0
Total valid votes/expense limit		34,767	100.00		
Total rejected, unmarked and declined ballots		687	1.94		
Turnout		35,454	55.84		
Electors on the lists		63,497			
Bloc Québécois notional hold		Swing		+5.49	
Changes from 2000 are based on redistributed results. Change for the Conservative Party is based on the combined Canadian Alliance and Progressive Conservative totals from 2000.
Sources: Official Results, Elections Canada and Financial Returns, Elections Canada.

2000 federal election redistributed results
Party	Vote	%
Bloc Québécois	21,095	57.63
Liberal	11,857	32.39
Canadian Alliance	2,021	5.52
Progressive Conservative	869	2.37
New Democratic	489	1.34
Independents	271	0.74

2000 Canadian federal election
Party	Candidate	Votes	%	±%
Bloc Québécois	Michel Gauthier	16,928	55.1	+3.0
Liberal	Jean-Pierre Boivin	10,680	34.7	+8.5
Alliance	Raymond A. Brideau	1,829	5.9	
Progressive Conservative	Marie-Christine Huot	870	2.8	-17.5
New Democratic	Alain Giguère	437	1.4	+0.1
Total valid votes		30,744	100.0	

1997 Canadian federal election
Party	Candidate	Votes	%	±%
Bloc Québécois	Michel Gauthier	16,207	52.1	-7.6
Liberal	Jean-Pierre Boivin	8,176	26.3	+5.9
Progressive Conservative	France Tanguay	6,312	20.3	+2.0
New Democratic	Alain Giguère	412	1.3	-0.2
Total valid votes		31,107	100.0	

1993 Canadian federal election
Party	Candidate	Votes	%	±%
Bloc Québécois	Michel Gauthier	18,869	59.7	
Liberal	Aurélien Gill	6,443	20.4	+8.3
Progressive Conservative	Henri-Paul Brassard	5,793	18.3	-58.0
New Democratic	Alain Giguère	485	1.5	-8.0
Total valid votes		31,590	100.0	

1988 Canadian federal election
Party	Candidate	Votes	%	±%
Progressive Conservative	Benoît Bouchard	26,717	76.4	+14.5
Liberal	Martin Cauvier	4,219	12.1	-22.7
New Democratic	Réjean Lalancette	3,318	9.5	+7.2
Rhinoceros	Mémile Michel Simard	723	2.1	
Total valid votes		34,977	100.0	

1984 Canadian federal election
Party	Candidate	Votes	%	±%
Progressive Conservative	Benoît Bouchard	22,981	61.8	+60.4
Liberal	Suzanne Beauchamp-Niquet	12,917	34.8	-17.2
New Democratic	Marius Tremblay	837	2.3	+0.6
Parti nationaliste	Candide Simard	422	1.1	
Total valid votes		37,157	100.0	

1980 Canadian federal election
Party	Candidate	Votes	%	±%
Liberal	Suzanne Beauchamp-Niquet	17,724	51.9	+11.6
Social Credit	Charles Arthur Gauthier	14,832	43.5	-2.5
New Democratic	Carol André Simard	569	1.7	+0.5
Progressive Conservative	Paul Desbiens	507	1.5	-9.4
Rhinoceros	Donald Bobette Simard	503	1.5	+0.3
Total valid votes		34,135	100.0	

1979 Canadian federal election
Party	Candidate	Votes	%	±%
Social Credit	Charles-Arthur Gauthier	15,582	45.9	-10.4
Liberal	Georges-Henri Bouchard	13,677	40.3	+2.5
Progressive Conservative	Jacques Brunet	3,705	10.9	+6.1
Rhinoceros	Pierre Marion	405	1.2	
New Democratic	Jacques Ouellet	385	1.1	+0.1
Union populaire	Raymond Archambault	183	0.5	
Total valid votes		33,937	100.0	

1974 Canadian federal election
Party	Candidate	Votes	%	±%
Social Credit	Charles-Arthur Gauthier	12,877	56.4	+5.2
Liberal	Louis-Ovide Bouchard	8,636	37.8	-0.5
Progressive Conservative	Louis-Georges Gagnon	1,096	4.8	-5.8
New Democratic	Jean-Pierre Vaillancourt	240	1.1	
Total valid votes		22,849	100.0	

1972 Canadian federal election
Party	Candidate	Votes	%	±%
Social Credit	Charles-Arthur Gauthier	11,316	51.1	+4.1
Liberal	Julien Mongeon	8,472	38.3	-3.0
Progressive Conservative	Marcel Vallée	2,347	10.6	+0.2
Total valid votes		22,135	100.0	

Note: Social Credit vote is compared to Ralliement créditiste vote in the 1968 election.

1968 Canadian federal election
Party	Candidate	Votes	%	±%
Ralliement créditiste	Charles-Arthur Gauthier	8,811	47.0	+2.5
Liberal	Lucien Larouche	7,727	41.3	+1.9
Progressive Conservative	Fernand Bouchard	1,951	10.4	-0.7
New Democratic	Pierre Cajolais	241	1.3	-3.7
Total valid votes		18,730	100.0	

1965 Canadian federal election
Party	Candidate	Votes	%	±%
Ralliement créditiste	Charles-Arthur Gauthier	8,736	44.6	-7.3
Liberal	Georges Villeneuve	7,712	39.3	+4.7
Progressive Conservative	Aurélien Talbot	2,189	11.2	+2.8
New Democratic	Robert Gaulin	968	4.9	-0.2
Total valid votes		19,605	100.0	

Note: Ralliement créditiste vote is compared to Social Credit vote in the 1963 election.

1963 Canadian federal election
Party	Candidate	Votes	%	±%
Social Credit	Charles-Arthur Gauthier	10,345	51.9	-1.6
Liberal	Albert Garant	6,908	34.6	+8.3
Progressive Conservative	J.-Eugène Perron	1,667	8.4	-11.8
New Democratic	Robert Gaulin	1,025	5.1	
Total valid votes		19,945	100.0	

1962 Canadian federal election
Party	Candidate	Votes	%	±%
Social Credit	Charles-Arthur Gauthier	11,180	53.5	
Liberal	Georges Villeneuve	5,510	26.4	-19.7
Progressive Conservative	Jean-Noël Tremblay	4,216	20.2	-33.8
Total valid votes		20,906	100.0	

1958 Canadian federal election
Party	Candidate	Votes	%	±%
Progressive Conservative	Jean-Noël Tremblay	10,696	53.9	+14.0
Liberal	Georges Villeneuve	9,130	46.1	-14.0
Total valid votes		19,826	100.0	

1957 Canadian federal election
Party	Candidate	Votes	%	±%
Liberal	Georges Villeneuve	10,860	60.0	+9.5
Progressive Conservative	Jean Lindsay	7,236	40.0	-9.5
Total valid votes		18,096	100.0	

1953 Canadian federal election
Party	Candidate	Votes	%	±%
Liberal	Georges Villeneuve	8,646	50.5	+14.5
Progressive Conservative	Paul-Henri Spence	8,477	49.5	+8.3
Total valid votes		17,123	100.0	

Canadian federal by-election, 26 May 1952
Party	Candidate	Votes	%	±%
Progressive Conservative	Paul-Henri Spence	6,703	41.2	–
Liberal	Cyrille Potvin	5,854	36.0	-13.7
Independent Liberal	Adjutor Boulanger	3,703	22.8	–
Total valid votes		16,260	100.0	
Called on Mr. Dion's acceptance of an office of emolument under the Crown, 8 April 1952

1949 Canadian federal election
Party	Candidate	Votes	%
Liberal	Joseph-Alfred Dion	8,103	49.7
Independent	J.-Augustin Fortin	6,078	37.3
Union des électeurs	Louis-Joseph-Xavier Dallaire	2,135	13.1
Total valid votes		16,316	100.0

== See also ==
- List of Canadian electoral districts
- Historical federal electoral districts of Canada
