= Joseph-Ludger Fillion =

Canadian politician

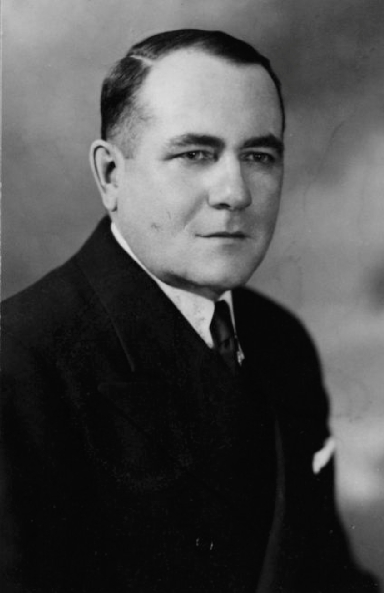

Member of the Legislative Assembly of Quebec for Lac-Saint-Jean
- In office 1931–1935
- Preceded by: Émile Moreau
- Succeeded by: Joseph-Léonard Duguay
- In office 1939–1948
- Preceded by: Joseph-Léonard Duguay
- Succeeded by: Antonio Auger

Personal details
- Born: May 17, 1895 Alma, Quebec
- Died: September 12, 1971 (aged 76) Quebec City, Quebec
- Party: Liberal

Joseph-Ludger Fillion (May 17, 1895 – September 12, 1971) was a Canadian provincial politician.

Born in Alma, Quebec, Fillion was the member of the Legislative Assembly of Quebec for Lac-Saint-Jean from 1931 to 1935 and from 1939 to 1948.
