= Stéphan Tremblay =

Canadian politician (born 1973)

Stéphan Tremblay (born 4 November 1973) is a former politician in Quebec, Canada. Tremblay was a member of the House of Commons of Canada from 1996 to 2002, and a member of the National Assembly of Quebec from 2002 to 2006. He was born in Alma, Quebec.

== Member of Parliament ==
He won a by-election in 1996 and succeeded Lucien Bouchard as Member of Parliament for the Lac-Saint-Jean electoral district. Tremblay was affiliated with the Bloc Québécois. He was re-elected in the 1997 and 2000 elections.

== Provincial politics ==
In 2002, he left federal politics and won a provincial by-election on June 17, 2002 as a Parti Québécois candidate. He represented the riding of Lac Saint-Jean in the Saguenay-Lac-Saint-Jean region. Tremblay was re-elected to the MNA in the 2003 election. He served as the opposition critic for environment until his resignation in 2006.

In 1998, he removed his green upholstered chair from the Canadian House of Commons and returned with it to his Quebec riding in protest of the gaps between the rich and the poor. He returned the chair a week later.

In August 2004, Tremblay was injured when the small plane he was flying crashed near Alma, Quebec after hitting Hydro-Québec's high-voltage power lines.

Parliament of Canada
Preceded by Lucien Bouchard (BQ)	Member of Parliament for Lac-Saint-Jean; 1997–2000	Succeeded by Electoral district changed name to Lac-Saint-Jean—Saguenay
Preceded by Electoral district was renamed from Lac-Saint-Jean	Member of Parliament for Lac-Saint-Jean—Saguenay; 2000–2002	Succeeded by Sébastien Gagnon
National Assembly of Quebec
Preceded by Jacques Brassard (PQ)	MNA for Lac-Saint-Jean; 2002–2007	Succeeded by Alexandre Cloutier (PQ)
