= Jacques Brassard =

Canadian politician

MNA for Lac-Saint-Jean
- In office 1976–2002
- Preceded by: Roger Pilote
- Succeeded by: Stéphan Tremblay

Minister of the Environment
- In office 1994–1996
- Preceded by: Pierre Paradis
- Succeeded by: David Cliche

Personal details
- Born: 27 June 1940 (age 85) Alma, Quebec
- Party: Parti Québécois
- Profession: politician, teacher

Jacques Brassard (born June 12, 1940 in Alma, Quebec) is a former Quebec politician and Cabinet Minister. He was the National Assembly of Quebec for Lac-Saint-Jean from 1976 to 2002 and occupied several portfolios as a Minister under the Parti Québecois governments of René Lévesque, Pierre-Marc Johnson, Jacques Parizeau, Lucien Bouchard and Bernard Landry.

Brassard conducted his university studies at Université de Montréal and Université de Sherbrooke and obtained a degree in pedagogy. After teaching at a local school board, he was a history teacher for nine years at Collège d'Alma before his entry to provincial politics in 1976. He was elected in Lac-Saint-Jean as the Parti Québécois won the elections for the first time since their creation. He was a backbencher member for the first mandate and was re-elected in 1981 and named the government Deputy Whip. He was later promoted as the Chief Whip in 1982, before being named into the Cabinet for the first time in 1984 as Minister of Recreation, Hunting and Fishing until the 1985 elections. Despite the PQ losing the election to the Quebec Liberal Party, Brassard was re-elected in 1985 and 1989, serving as the Chief Whip of the Official Opposition.

After his re-election in 1994 and the return to power of the PQ, he was named Minister for several portfolios from 1994 to his resignation in 2002, including Minister of Environment and Wildlife, Canadian Intergovernmental Affairs, Parliamentary Reform, Transports and Natural Resources. He was also the Government House Leader just before the 1998 elections until his resignation on January 29, 2002. Brassard resigned after refusing a secondary Cabinet position offered by then-Premier Bernard Landry. He resigned on the same date as then-Minister of Transports Guy Chevrette, another veteran PQ member.

He later worked for the Saguenay-Lac-Saint-Jean newspaper Le Quotidien.
