= Roger Parizeau =

Canadian politician

Member of Parliament for Lac-Saint-Jean
- In office 31 March 1958 – 17 June 1962
- Preceded by: André Gauthier
- Succeeded by: Marcel Lessard

Personal details
- Born: Joseph Aimé Roger Parizeau; 30 May 1920 Montreal, Quebec, Canada
- Died: 22 May 1968 (aged 47) Alma, Quebec, Canada
- Party: Progressive Conservative
- Spouse: Fernande Couture
- Profession: Salesman

Joseph Aimé Roger Parizeau (30 May 1920 – 22 May 1968) was a Progressive Conservative party member of the House of Commons of Canada. He was born in Montreal, Quebec and became a salesman by career.

Parizeau first attempted to win the Lac-Saint-Jean riding in the 1957 federal election but lost to André Gauthier of the Liberal Party who held that riding since 1949. Parizeau won the seat from Gauthier in the following year's election and served one term, the 24th Canadian Parliament, before his defeat in the 1962 election by Marcel Lessard of the Liberals.
