= Denis Lebel =

Canadian politician

The Honourable Denis Lebel PC
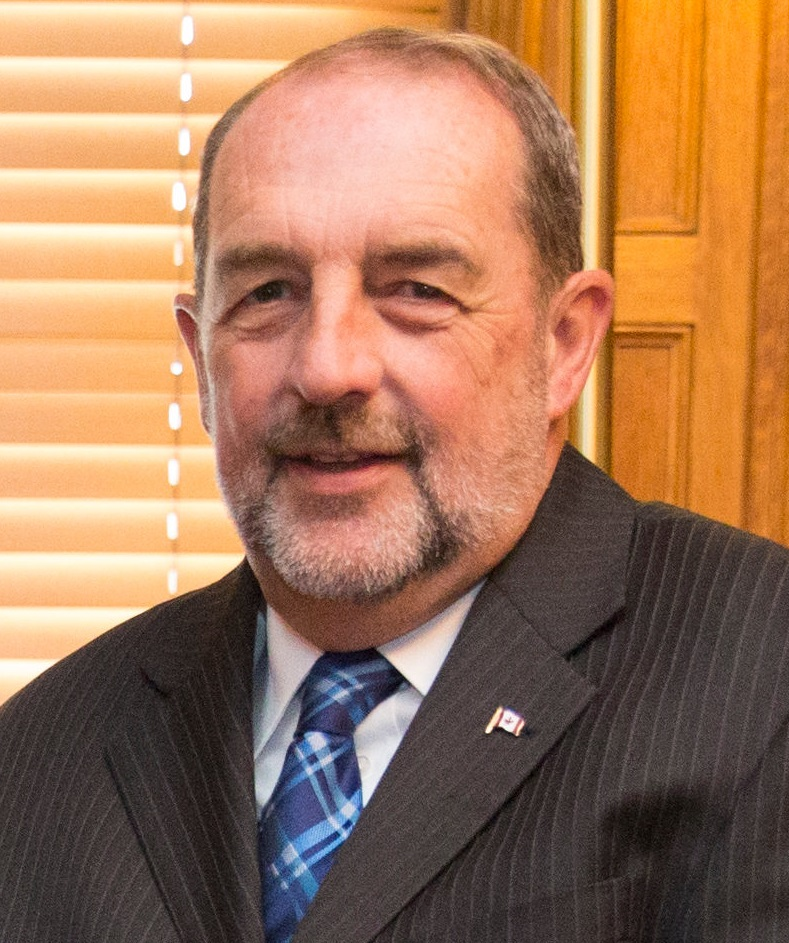

Deputy Leader of the Opposition
- In office November 19, 2015 – July 24, 2017
- Leader: Rona Ambrose; Andrew Scheer
- Preceded by: Position established
- Succeeded by: Lisa Raitt

Deputy Leader of the Conservative Party
- In office November 18, 2015 – July 20, 2017
- Leader: Rona Ambrose (interim); Andrew Scheer
- Preceded by: Peter MacKay
- Succeeded by: Lisa Raitt

Minister of Infrastructure, Communities and Intergovernmental Affairs
- In office March 15, 2013 – November 4, 2015
- Prime Minister: Stephen Harper
- Preceded by: Peter Penashue
- Succeeded by: Justin Trudeau

Minister of Transport
- In office May 18, 2011 – July 15, 2013
- Prime Minister: Stephen Harper
- Preceded by: Chuck Strahl
- Succeeded by: Lisa Raitt

Member of Parliament for Lac-Saint-Jean (Roberval—Lac-Saint-Jean; 2007–2015)
- In office September 17, 2007 – August 9, 2017
- Preceded by: Michel Gauthier
- Succeeded by: Richard Hébert

Mayor of Roberval
- In office 2000–2007
- Preceded by: Claude Munger
- Succeeded by: Michel Larouche

Personal details
- Born: May 26, 1954 (age 72) Roberval, Quebec, Canada
- Party: Conservative (2007–present)
- Other political affiliations: Bloc Québécois (1993-2001)
- Spouse: Danielle Girard
- Profession: hotel manager, restaurateur

Denis Lebel PC (born May 26, 1954) is a Canadian politician who served as mayor of Roberval, Quebec, and deputy leader of the Official Opposition.

== Political career ==
Lebel was elected to the House of Commons of Canada on September 17, 2007, in the Roberval—Lac-Saint-Jean by-election, as a member of the Conservative Party. Four years later, it emerged that he had been an active member of the Bloc Quebecois from 1993 to 2001. Lebel stated that he joined the Conservatives because Prime Minister Stephen Harper recognized the Québécois nation, and maintains that he has always been a Quebec nationalist.

On October 30, 2008, he was appointed to Harper's cabinet as minister of the Economic Development Agency of Canada for the Regions of Quebec. Following the 2011 election, Lebel was promoted to minister of transport. He was shuffled out of the post in July 2013, shortly after the Lac-Megantic rail disaster.

He was also the minister of infrastructure, communities and intergovernmental affairs and served as the Harper government's Quebec lieutenant.

In the 2015 election, Lebel was re-elected in the new Lac-Saint-Jean riding.

After the election, he and fellow member of Parliament (MP) Michelle Rempel proposed to become joint interim leaders of the party but ultimately lost to Rona Ambrose.

On November 18, 2015 he was named deputy leader of the Conservative Party and thus deputy Opposition leader.

== Career after politics ==
Lebel announced on June 19, 2017, that he would step down as an MP in the following weeks, before the House of Commons resumed sitting in the fall. The seat was lost to the Liberals in the following by-election.

The Montreal Gazette reported on June 20, 2017, that Lebel was to be appointed as the CEO of Québec Forest Industry Council. It was also reported that then-premier of Quebec, Philippe Couillard was interested in recruiting Lebel to run for the Quebec Liberals in the 2018 Quebec general election, but he did not run.

== Electoral history ==
2015 Canadian federal election: Lac-Saint-Jean
Party	Candidate	Votes	%	±%	Expenditures
Conservative	Denis Lebel	18,393	33.27	-8.99	–
New Democratic	Gisèle Dallaire	15,735	28.46	-3.68	–
Liberal	Sabin Simard	10,193	18.44	+15.19	–
Bloc Québécois	Sabin Gaudreault	10,152	18.37	-2.63	–
Green	Laurence Requilé	806	1.46	+0.12	–
Total valid votes/expense limit		55,279	100.0		$278,464.25
Total rejected ballots		925	–	–	
Turnout		56,204	–	–	
Eligible voters		85,337			
Source: Elections Canada

2011 Canadian federal election: Roberval—Lac-Saint-Jean
Party	Candidate	Votes	%	±%	Expenditures
Conservative	Denis Lebel	18,438	45.68	+2.14	$99,662
New Democratic	Yvon Guay	11,182	27.70	+22.99	$1,983
Bloc Québécois	Claude Pilote	8,577	21.25	-18.40	$70,809
Liberal	Bernard Garneau	1,615	4.00	-6.09	$5,913
Green	Steeve Simard	553	1.37	-0.63	–
Total valid votes/expense limit		40,365	100.00		$102,172
Total rejected ballots		494	1.21	+0.04	
Turnout		40,859	64.42	+5.43	

2008 Canadian federal election: Roberval—Lac-Saint-Jean
Party	Candidate	Votes	%	±%	Expenditures
Conservative	Denis Lebel	16,055	43.54	-16.14	$88,243
Bloc Québécois	Claude Pilote	14,619	39.65	+12.89	$79,101
Liberal	Bernard Garneau	3,721	10.09	+0.54	$9,041
New Democratic	Catherine Forbes	1,738	4.71	+2.40	–
Green	Jocelyn Tremblay	737	2.00	+0.29	–
Total valid votes/expense limit		36,870	100.00		$98,690
Total rejected ballots		437	1.17	–	
Turnout		37,307	58.99	–	
Conservative hold		Swing		-14.18	

Canadian federal by-election, September 17, 2007: Roberval—Lac-Saint-Jean
Party	Candidate	Votes	%	±%	Expenditures
Conservative	Denis Lebel	17,463	59.68	+22.50	$95,449
Bloc Québécois	Céline Houde	7,830	26.76	-18.44	$93,915
Liberal	Louise Boulanger	2,795	9.55	+1.80	$51,293
New Democratic	Éric Dubois	675	2.31	-3.22	$3,123
Green	Jean-Luc Boily	499	1.71	-2.63	–
Total valid votes/expense limit		29,262	100.00		$95,677
Total rejected ballots		265	0.90		
Turnout		29,527	46.83		
Conservative gain from Bloc Québécois		Swing		+20.23	

28th Canadian Ministry (2006–2015) – Cabinet of Stephen Harper
Cabinet posts (3)
Predecessor	Office	Successor
Chuck Strahl	Minister of Transport; 2011–2013	Lisa Raitt
Peter Penashue	Minister of Intergovernmental Affairs; 2013–2015	Justin Trudeau
Jean-Pierre Blackburn	Minister of the Economic Development Agency of Canada for the Regions of Quebec; 2008–2015 styled as Minister of State (Economic Development Agency of Canada for the Regions of Quebec)	Position Abolished
