= Georges Villeneuve =

Canadian politician (1922–2020)

Mayor of Mistassini, Quebec
- In office 1961–1968

Member of Parliament for Roberval
- In office 10 August 1953 – 30 March 1958
- Preceded by: Paul-Henri Spence
- Succeeded by: Jean-Noël Tremblay

Personal details
- Born: 20 February 1922 Saint-Prime, Quebec, Canada
- Died: 17 February 2020 (aged 97)
- Party: Liberal
- Profession: Notary

Georges Villeneuve (French pronunciation: [ʒɔʁʒ vilnœv]; 20 February 1922 – 17 February 2020) was a Liberal party member of the House of Commons of Canada.

== Life and career ==
After school studies in Saint-Prime, then at the seminaries in Chicoutimi and Nicolet, Villeneuve began law studies in 1946 at Université Laval in Quebec City. After his graduation in 1949, he was granted status as a notary and opened a practice in Mistassini that August.

Villeneuve was first elected at the Roberval riding in the 1953 general election then re-elected for one more term in 1957. He was defeated in the 1958 election by Jean-Noël Tremblay of the Progressive Conservative party. Villeneuve made two further unsuccessful attempts to win back Roberval in 1962 and 1965.

From 1961 to 1968, Villeneuve was mayor of Mistassini. He continued his notary practice until his retirement in 1985.
