= San Bruno (disambiguation) =

San Bruno is a city in California.

San Bruno may also refer to:

- San Bruno (BART station)
- San Bruno (Caltrain station)
- San Bruno Mountain, California
- San Bruno Creek, California
- San Bruno, Baja California Sur, Mexico, a populated place
- Misión San Bruno, a short-lived Jesuit mission (1683-1685) on the Gulf of California
- Vicente San Bruno (died 1817), Spanish military officer

== See also ==
- Saint Bruno (disambiguation)
