= Lac-Saint-Jean (provincial electoral district) =

Provincial electoral district in Quebec, Canada

Quebec electoral district
- Coordinates: 49.598°N 71.472°W

Provincial electoral district
- Legislature: National Assembly of Quebec
MNA
William Fradette
Parti Québécois
- District created: 1890
- First contested: 1890
- Last contested: 2026

Demographics
- Electors (2012): 42,637
- Area (km²): 20,185.0
- Census subdivision(s): Alma, Desbiens, Hébertville, Labrecque, Lamarche, Larouche, L'Ascension-de-Notre-Seigneur, Métabetchouan–Lac-à-la-Croix, Saint-Gédéon, Saint-Henri-de-Taillon, Saint-Ludger-de-Milot, Sainte-Monique, Saint-Nazaire; Belle-Rivière, Lac-Achouakan, Lac-Moncouche, Mont-Apica, Passes-Dangereuses (part)

Lac-Saint-Jean (French: [lak sɛ̃ ʒɑ̃], Quebec French pronunciation: [lak sẽ ʒã]) is a provincial electoral district in the Saguenay-Lac-Saint-Jean region of Quebec, Canada, that elects members to the National Assembly of Quebec. It notably includes the municipalities of Alma, Hébertville and Métabetchouan–Lac-à-la-Croix.

It was created for the 1890 election.

In the change from the 2001 to the 2011 electoral map, it lost Saint-André-du-Lac-Saint-Jean and part of the unorganized territory of Passes-Dangereuses to Roberval electoral district.

It is named for Lac Saint-Jean.

== Linguistic demographics ==
- Francophone: 99.4%
- Anglophone: 0.4%
- Allophone: 0.2%

per cent mother tongue — single answers

== Members of the Legislative Assembly / National Assembly ==
| Legislature | Years | Member | Party |
|---|---|---|---|
| 7th | 1890–1892 | Pierre-Léandre Marcotte | Liberal |
| 8th | 1892–1897 | Joseph Girard | Conservative |
| 9th | 1897–1900 | Joseph Girard | Conservative |
| 10th | 1900–1904 | Georges Tanguay | Liberal |
| 11th | 1904–1908 | Georges Tanguay | Liberal |
| 12th | 1908–1908 | Théodore-Louise-Antoine Broet | Liberal |
| 12th | 1908–1912 | Jean-Baptiste Carbonneau | Liberal |
| 13th | 1912–1916 | Jean-Baptiste Carbonneau | Liberal |
| 14th | 1916–1919 | Jean-Sylvio-Narcisse Turcotte | Conservative |
| 15th | 1919–1923 | Émile Moreau | Liberal |
| 16th | 1923–1927 | Émile Moreau | Liberal |
| 17th | 1927–1931 | Émile Moreau | Liberal |
| 18th | 1931–1935 | Joseph-Ludger Fillion | Liberal |
| 19th | 1935–1936 | Joseph-Léonard Duguay | Conservative |
| 20th | 1936–1939 | Joseph-Léonard Duguay | Union Nationale |
| 21st | 1939–1944 | Joseph-Ludger Fillion | Liberal |
| 22nd | 1944–1948 | Joseph-Ludger Fillion | Liberal |
| 23rd | 1948–1952 | Antonio Auger | Union Nationale |
| 24th | 1952–1956 | Antonio Auger | Union Nationale |
| 25th | 1956–1959 | Antonio Auger | Union Nationale |
| 25th | 1959–1960 | Jean-Paul Levasseur | Union Nationale |
| 26th | 1960–1962 | Lucien Collard | Liberal |
| 27th | 1962–1966 | Lucien Collard | Liberal |
| 28th | 1966–1970 | Joseph-Léonce Desmeules | Union Nationale |
| 29th | 1970–1973 | Roger Pilote | Liberal |
| 30th | 1973–1976 | Roger Pilote | Liberal |
| 31st | 1976–1981 | Jacques Brassard | Parti Québécois |
| 32nd | 1981–1985 | Jacques Brassard | Parti Québécois |
| 33rd | 1985–1989 | Jacques Brassard | Parti Québécois |
| 34th | 1989–1994 | Jacques Brassard | Parti Québécois |
| 35th | 1994–1998 | Jacques Brassard | Parti Québécois |
| 36th | 1998–2002 | Jacques Brassard | Parti Québécois |
| 36th | 2002–2003 | Stéphan Tremblay | Parti Québécois |
| 37th | 2003–2007 | Stéphan Tremblay | Parti Québécois |
| 38th | 2007–2008 | Alexandre Cloutier | Parti Québécois |
| 39th | 2008–2012 | Alexandre Cloutier | Parti Québécois |
| 40th | 2012–2014 | Alexandre Cloutier | Parti Québécois |
| 41st | 2014–2018 | Alexandre Cloutier | Parti Québécois |
| 42nd | 2018–2022 | Éric Girard | Coalition Avenir Québec |
| 43rd | 2022–2026 | Éric Girard | Coalition Avenir Québec |
| 44th | 2026–Present | William Fradette | Parti Québécois |

== Election results ==
2026 Quebec general election
** Preliminary results — Not yet official **
| Party | Candidate | Votes | % | ±% |
|---|---|---|---|---|
| Parti Québécois | William Fradette | 13,676 | 45.61 | +19.99 |
| Conservative | Tommy Gauthier | 6,688 | 22.30 | +10.93 |
| Coalition Avenir Québec | François Cormier | 4,549 | 15.17 | –36.30 |
| Liberal | Anne Pâquet | 2,716 | 9.06 | +6.04 |
| Québec solidaire | Antoine Bessette | 2,043 | 6.81 | –0.77 |
| Climat Québec | Sylvain Tremblay | 186 | 0.62 | +0.08 |
| Présence | Stefany Tremblay | 129 | 0.43 | N/A |
| Total valid votes | | 29,987 | 98.51 | +0.56 |
| Total rejected ballots | | 453 | 1.49 | –0.56 |
| Turnout | | 30,440 | 68.05 | +0.87 |
| Electors on the lists | | 44,732 | | |
| Parti Québécois gain from Coalition Avenir Québec | | Swing | | +4.53 |
Source: Élections Québec

2022 Quebec general election
| Party | Candidate | Votes | % | ±% |
|---|---|---|---|---|
| Coalition Avenir Québec | Éric Girard | 14,798 | 51.47 | +12.01 |
| Parti Québécois | William Fradette | 7,367 | 25.62 | –5.91 |
| Conservative | Luc Martel | 3,270 | 11.37 | +10.43 |
| Québec solidaire | Elsa Moulin | 2,178 | 7.58 | –7.27 |
| Liberal | Tricia Murray | 867 | 3.02 | –9.51 |
| Climat Québec | Martin Lavoie | 156 | 0.54 | New |
| Libertarian | Chantale Villeneuve | 116 | 0.40 | New |
| Total valid votes | | 28,752 | 97.95 | |
| Total rejected ballots | | 601 | 2.05 | +0.29 |
| Turnout | | 29,353 | 67.18 | –1.50 |
| Electors on the lists | | 43,691 | | |
| Coalition Avenir Québec hold | | Swing | | +8.96 |
Source: Élections Québec

2018 Quebec general election
| Party | Candidate | Votes | % | ±% |
|---|---|---|---|---|
| Coalition Avenir Québec | Éric Girard | 11,437 | 39.46 | +21.15 |
| Parti Québécois | William Fradette | 9,138 | 31.53 | -13 |
| Québec solidaire | Manon Girard | 4,305 | 14.85 | +8.52 |
| Liberal | Mathieu Huot | 3,630 | 12.53 | -15.67 |
| Conservative | Michael Grecoff | 272 | 0.94 | +0.14 |
| Équipe Autonomiste | Maude Gouin Huot | 199 | 0.69 | |
| Total valid votes | | 28,981 | 98.24 | |
| Total rejected ballots | | 518 | 1.76 | |
| Turnout | | 29,499 | 68.68 | |
| Eligible voters | | 42,954 | | |
| Coalition Avenir Québec gain from Parti Québécois | | Swing | | +17.08 |
Source(s) "Rapport des résultats officiels du scrutin". Élections Québec.

2014 Quebec general election
| Party | Candidate | Votes | % |
|---|---|---|---|
| Parti Québécois | Alexandre Cloutier | 13,159 | 44.53 |
| Liberal | Pascal Gagnon | 8,331 | 28.19 |
| Coalition Avenir Québec | Élise Marchildon | 5,412 | 18.32 |
| Québec solidaire | Frédérick Plamondon | 1,872 | 6.34 |
| Parti nul | Francis Dubé | 318 | 1.08 |
| Conservative | Yann Lavoie | 235 | 0.80 |
| Option nationale | Sabrina Fauteux-Aïmola | 222 | 0.75 |
| Total valid votes | | 29,549 | 98.34 |
| Total rejected ballots | | 500 | 1.66 |
| Turnout | | 30,049 | 69.84 |
| Electors on the lists | | 43,027 | – |

2012 Quebec general election
| Party | Candidate | Votes | % |
|---|---|---|---|
| Parti Québécois | Alexandre Cloutier | 16,972 | 53.11 |
| Coalition Avenir Québec | Michel Simard | 8,540 | 24.11 |
| Liberal | Jeannot Boulianne | 5,270 | 16.49 |
| Québec solidaire | Frédérick Plamondon | 1,214 | 3.80 |
| Option nationale | Jordan Racine | 323 | 1.01 |
| Green | France Bergeron | 275 | 0.86 |
| Bloc Pot | Matthew Babin | 200 | 0.63 |
| Total valid votes | | 31,958 | 99.04 |
| Total rejected ballots | | 310 | 0.96 |
| Turnout | | 32,268 | 75.53 |
| Electors on the lists | | 42,721 | – |

2008 Quebec general election
| Party | Candidate | Votes | % | ±% |
|---|---|---|---|---|
| Parti Québécois | Alexandre Cloutier | 14,539 | 55.62 | |
| Liberal | Pierre Simard | 7,825 | 29.94 | |
| Action démocratique | Sylvain Carbonneau | 2,764 | 10.57 | |
| Québec solidaire | Samuel Thivierge | 527 | 2.02 | |
| Green | France Bergeron | 483 | 1.85 | – |

2007 Quebec general election
| Party | Candidate | Votes | % | ±% |
|---|---|---|---|---|
| Parti Québécois | Alexandre Cloutier | 14,754 | 46.45 | |
| Liberal | Yves Bolduc | 9,165 | 28.85 | |
| Action démocratique | Éric Girard | 6,835 | 21.52 | |
| Québec solidaire | Denis Plamondon | 536 | 1.69 | |
| Green | Vital Tremblay | 475 | 1.50 | – |

2003 Quebec general election
| Party | Candidate | Votes | % | ±% |
|---|---|---|---|---|
| Parti Québécois | Stéphan Tremblay | 15,200 | 53.71 | |
| Liberal | Benoît Harvey | 7,405 | 26.17 | |
| Action démocratique | Roger Filion | 5,694 | 20.12 | |

Quebec provincial by-election, 2002
| Party | Candidate | Votes | % |
|---|---|---|---|
| Parti Québécois | Stéphan Tremblay | 10,924 | 43.50 |
| Action démocratique | Jocelyn Fradette | 10,273 | 40.91 |
| Liberal | Jean-Claude Martel | 3,914 | 15.59 |
| Total valid votes | | 25,111 | 98.90 |
| Total rejected ballots | | 280 | 1.10 |
| Turnout | | 25,391 | 76.78 |
| Electors on the lists | | 41,090 | – |

1998 Quebec general election
| Party | Candidate | Votes | % |
|---|---|---|---|
| Parti Québécois | Jacques Brassard | 21,498 | 70.56 |
| Liberal | Nöel Girard | 5,792 | 19.01 |
| Action démocratique | Martin Duchesne | 3,178 | 10.43 |
| Total valid votes | | 30,468 | 98.89 |
| Total rejected ballots | | 343 | 1.11 |
| Turnout | | 30,811 | 76.78 |
| Electors on the lists | | 40,129 | – |

1995 Quebec referendum
| Side | Votes | % |
|---|---|---|
| Oui | 25,857 | 73.06 |
| Non | 9,534 | 26.94 |

1994 Quebec general election
| Party | Candidate | Votes | % |
|---|---|---|---|
| Parti Québécois | Jacques Brassard | 20,743 | 71.67 |
| Liberal | Denis Simard | 7,269 | 25.11 |
| Natural Law | Lise Dufour | 931 | 3.22 |
| Total valid votes | | 28,943 | 98.08 |
| Total rejected ballots | | 568 | 1.92 |
| Turnout | | 29,511 | 78.58 |
| Electors on the lists | | 37,557 | – |

1992 Charlottetown Accord referendum
| Side | Votes | % |
|---|---|---|
| Non | 23,306 | 76.14 |
| Oui | 7,302 | 23.86 |

1985 Quebec general election
| Party | Candidate | Votes | % |
|---|---|---|---|
| Parti Québécois | Jacques Brassard | 17,028 | 54.82 |
| Liberal | Luc Harvey | 12,765 | 41.09 |
| New Democratic | Jean-Claude Martel | 1,072 | 3.45 |
| Christian Socialist | Johanne Collard | 199 | 0.64 |
| Total valid votes | | 31,064 | 99.08 |
| Total rejected ballots | | 289 | 0.92 |
| Turnout | | 31,353 | 83.30 |
| Electors on the lists | | 37,640 | – |

1981 Quebec general election
| Party | Candidate | Votes | % |
|---|---|---|---|
| Parti Québécois | Jacques Brassard | 19,602 | 62.32 |
| Liberal | Maurice Paradis | 10,648 | 33.85 |
| Union Nationale | Benoit Martel | 1,205 | 3.83 |
| Total valid votes | | 31,455 | 99.35 |
| Total rejected ballots | | 206 | 0.65 |
| Turnout | | 31,661 | 86.29 |
| Electors on the lists | | 36,692 | – |

1980 Quebec referendum
| Side | Votes | % |
|---|---|---|
| Oui | 17,674 | 57.61 |
| Non | 13,007 | 42.39 |

1976 Quebec general election
| Party | Candidate | Votes | % |
|---|---|---|---|
| Parti Québécois | Jacques Brassard | 14,744 | 50.91 |
| Liberal | Roger Pilote | 7,833 | 27.05 |
| Union Nationale | Charles-Henri Larouche | 3,971 | 13.71 |
| Ralliement créditiste | Maurice Brodeur | 2,414 | 8.33 |
| Total valid votes | | 28,962 | 98.62 |
| Total rejected ballots | | 404 | 1.38 |
| Turnout | | 29,366 | 86.97 |
| Electors on the lists | | 33,767 | – |

1973 Quebec general election
| Party | Candidate | Votes | % |
|---|---|---|---|
| Liberal | Roger Pilote | 12,554 | 50.70 |
| Parti Québécois | Georges-Henri Fortin | 9,217 | 37.22 |
| Ralliement créditiste | Maurice Brodeur | 1,545 | 6.22 |
| Union Nationale | Claude Gauthier | 1,378 | 5.57 |
| Independent | Claude Gagnon | 68 | 0.27 |
| Total valid votes | | 24,762 | 98.52 |
| Total rejected ballots | | 373 | 1.48 |
| Turnout | | 25,135 | 85.23 |
| Electors on the lists | | 29,490 | – |

1970 Quebec general election
| Party | Candidate | Votes | % |
|---|---|---|---|
| Liberal | Roger Pilote | 9,339 | 39.76 |
| Parti Québécois | Georges-Henri Fortin | 7,873 | 33.52 |
| Union Nationale | Joseph-Léonce Desmeules | 5,515 | 23.48 |
| Ralliement créditiste | Armand Gaudreault | 761 | 3.24 |
| Total valid votes | | 23,488 | 98.98 |
| Total rejected ballots | | 373 | 1.02 |
| Turnout | | 23,731 | 89.23 |
| Electors on the lists | | 26,594 | – |

1966 Quebec general election
| Party | Candidate | Votes | % |
|---|---|---|---|
| Union Nationale | Joseph-Léonce Desmeules | 10,985 | 52.22 |
| Liberal | Lucien Collard | 8,430 | 40.07 |
| Ralliement national | Normand Bergeron | 1,621 | 7.71 |
| Total valid votes | | 23,488 | 98.40 |
| Total rejected ballots | | 341 | 1.60 |
| Turnout | | 21,377 | 86.09 |
| Electors on the lists | | 24,831 | – |

1962 Quebec general election
| Party | Candidate | Votes | % |
|---|---|---|---|
| Liberal | Lucien Collard | 9,171 | 52.63 |
| Union Nationale | Paul Levasseur | 8,256 | 47.37 |
| Total valid votes | | 17,427 | 99.04 |
| Total rejected ballots | | 169 | 0.96 |
| Turnout | | 17,596 | 89.25 |
| Electors on the lists | | 19,716 | – |

1960 Quebec general election
| Party | Candidate | Votes | % |
|---|---|---|---|
| Liberal | Lucien Collard | 9,844 | 56.65 |
| Union Nationale | Paul Levasseur | 7,534 | 43.35 |
| Total valid votes | | 17,378 | 99.30 |
| Total rejected ballots | | 123 | 0.70 |
| Turnout | | 17,501 | 91.75 |
| Electors on the lists | | 19,075 | – |

Quebec provincial by-election, 1959
| Party | Candidate | Votes | % |
|---|---|---|---|
| Union Nationale | Jean-Paul Levasseur | 8,469 | 56.16 |
| Independent | Raymond Lapointe | 3,324 | 22.04 |
| Social Democratic | Michel Chartrand | 3,286 | 21.79 |
| Total valid votes | | 23,488 | 98.40 |
| Total rejected ballots | | 341 | 1.60 |
| Turnout | | 21,377 | 86.09 |
| Electors on the lists | | 24,831 | – |

1956 Quebec general election
| Party | Candidate | Votes | % |
|---|---|---|---|
| Union Nationale | Antonio Auger | 7,534 | 43.35 |
| Liberal | Lucien Collard | 9,844 | 56.65 |
| Total valid votes | | 17,378 | 99.30 |
| Total rejected ballots | | 123 | 0.70 |
| Turnout | | 17,501 | 91.75 |
| Electors on the lists | | 19,074 | – |

1952 Quebec general election
| Party | Candidate | Votes | % |
|---|---|---|---|
| Union Nationale | Antonio Auger | 8,180 | 57.87 |
| Liberal | Louis-Patrick Falardeau | 5,795 | 40.99 |
| Independent UN | Lionel Charlebois | 161 | 1.14 |
| Total valid votes | | 14,136 | 99.12 |
| Total rejected ballots | | 126 | 0.88 |
| Turnout | | 14,262 | 85.78 |
| Electors on the lists | | 16,627 | – |

1948 Quebec general election
| Party | Candidate | Votes | % |
|---|---|---|---|
| Union Nationale | Antonio Auger | 6,277 | 55.12 |
| Liberal | Joseph-Ludger Fillion | 4,616 | 40.54 |
| Union des électeurs | Delphis Larouche | 494 | 4.34 |
| Total valid votes | | 11,387 | 99.04 |
| Total rejected ballots | | 110 | 0.96 |
| Turnout | | 11,497 | 93.33 |
| Electors on the lists | | 12,318 | – |

1944 Quebec general election
| Party | Candidate | Votes | % |
|---|---|---|---|
| Liberal | Joseph-Ludger Fillion | 3,718 | 38.07 |
| Union Nationale | Joseph-Aimé Fortin | 3,609 | 36.95 |
| Bloc populaire | Camille Lavoie | 1,944 | 19.91 |
| Union des électeurs | Edmond Major | 495 | 5.07 |
| Total valid votes | | 9,766 | 99.43 |
| Total rejected ballots | | 56 | 0.57 |
| Turnout | | 9,822 | 93.33 |
| Electors on the lists | | 10,976 | – |

1939 Quebec general election
| Party | Candidate | Votes | % |
|---|---|---|---|
| Liberal | Joseph-Ludger Fillion | 2,482 | 51.05 |
| Union Nationale | Joseph-Léonard Duguay | 2,347 | 48.27 |
| Action libérale nationale | Eutrope Gaudreault | 33 | 0.68 |
| Total valid votes | | 4,862 | 99.31 |
| Total rejected ballots | | 34 | 0.69 |
| Turnout | | 4,896 | 89.15 |
| Electors on the lists | | 5,492 | – |

1936 Quebec general election
| Party | Candidate | Votes | % |
|---|---|---|---|
| Union Nationale | Joseph-Léonard Duguay | 2,544 | 54.28 |
| Liberal | Joseph-Adélard Plourde | 2,143 | 45.27 |
| Total valid votes | | 4,687 | 99.81 |
| Total rejected ballots | | 9 | 0.19 |
| Turnout | | 4,696 | 90.12 |
| Electors on the lists | | 5,211 | – |

1931 Quebec general election
| Party | Candidate | Votes | % |
|---|---|---|---|
| Liberal | Joseph-Ludger Fillion | 2,055 | 52.75 |
| Conservative | Lorenzo Deschênes | 1,841 | 47.25 |
| Total valid votes | | 3,896 | 99.39 |
| Total rejected ballots | | 24 | 0.61 |
| Turnout | | 3,920 | 80.84 |
| Electors on the lists | | 4,849 | – |

1927 Quebec general election
| Party | Candidate | Votes | % |
|---|---|---|---|
| Liberal | Émile Moreau | 4,142 | 64.07 |
| Conservative | Arthur Arcand | 3,593 | 50.59 |
| Total valid votes | | 6,465 | 98.72 |
| Total rejected ballots | | 84 | 1.28 |
| Turnout | | 6,549 | 67.91 |
| Electors on the lists | | 9,643 | – |

1923 Quebec general election
| Party | Candidate | Votes | % |
|---|---|---|---|
| Liberal | Émile Moreau | 3,266 | 69.22 |
| Conservative | Joseph-Arthur Bouchard | 1,452 | 30.78 |
| Total valid votes | | 4,718 | 99.45 |
| Total rejected ballots | | 26 | 0.55 |
| Turnout | | 4,744 | 57.10 |
| Electors on the lists | | 8,308 | – |

1919 Quebec general election
| Party | Candidate | Votes | % |
|---|---|---|---|
| Liberal | Émile Moreau | 3,697 | 74.70 |
| Conservative | Thomas-Louis Bergeron | 1,251 | 25.30 |
| Total valid votes | | 4,945 | 98.92 |
| Total rejected ballots | | 54 | 1.08 |
| Turnout | | 4,999 | 57.10 |
| Electors on the lists | | 7,056 | – |

1916 Quebec general election
| Party | Candidate | Votes | % |
|---|---|---|---|
| Conservative | Joseph-Sylvio-Narcisse Turcotte | 2,113 | 39.83 |
| Liberal | Alexander Benjamin Scott | 1,620 | 30.54 |
| Liberal | Émile Moreau | 1,572 | 29.63 |
| Total valid votes | | 5,305 | 98.44 |
| Total rejected ballots | | 84 | 1.56 |
| Turnout | | 5,389 | 82.07 |
| Electors on the lists | | 6,566 | – |

1912 Quebec general election
| Party | Candidate | Votes | % |
|---|---|---|---|
| Liberal | Jean-Baptiste Carbonneau | 2,616 | 59.59 |
| Conservative | Gédéon Verreault | 1,774 | 40.41 |
| Total valid votes | | 4,390 | 98.44 |
| Total rejected ballots | | 24 | 1.56 |
| Turnout | | 4,414 | 65.26 |
| Electors on the lists | | 6,764 | – |

Quebec provincial by-election, 1908
| Party | Candidate | Votes | % |
|---|---|---|---|
| Liberal | Jean-Baptiste Carbonneau | Acclaimed | |

1908 Quebec general election
| Party | Candidate | Votes | % |
|---|---|---|---|
| Liberal | Théodore-Louis-Antoine Broët | 2,506 | 58.43 |
| Conservative | Hermas Doyon | 1,783 | 41.57 |
| Total valid votes | | 4,289 | 99.24 |
| Total rejected ballots | | 33 | 0.76 |
| Turnout | | 4,322 | 75.93 |
| Electors on the lists | | 5,692 | – |

1904 Quebec general election
| Party | Candidate | Votes | % |
|---|---|---|---|
| Liberal | Georges Tanguay | 1,802 | 52.51 |
| Liberal | Jean-Baptiste Carbonneau | 1,630 | 47.49 |
| Total valid votes | | 3,432 | 99.28 |
| Total rejected ballots | | 25 | 0.72 |
| Turnout | | 3,457 | 70.12 |
| Electors on the lists | | 4,930 | – |

1900 Quebec general election
| Party | Candidate | Votes | % |
|---|---|---|---|
| Liberal | Georges Tanguay | Acclaimed | |
| Electors on the lists | | 4,076 | – |

1897 Quebec general election
| Party | Candidate | Votes | % |
|---|---|---|---|
| Conservative | Joseph Girard | 1,555 | 56.20 |
| Liberal | L.-C.-P.-C. Dupuis | 1,212 | 43.80 |
| Total valid votes | | 2,767 | 98.86 |
| Total rejected ballots | | 32 | 1.14 |
| Turnout | | 2,799 | 68.86 |
| Electors on the lists | | 4,065 | – |

1892 Quebec general election
| Party | Candidate | Votes | % |
|---|---|---|---|
| Conservative | Joseph Girard | 1,017 | 51.39 |
| Liberal | Paul-Léandre Marcotte | 962 | 48.61 |
| Total valid votes | | 1,979 | 98.85 |
| Total rejected ballots | | 23 | 1.15 |
| Turnout | | 2,002 | 68.84 |
| Electors on the lists | | 2,908 | – |

1890 Quebec general election
| Party | Candidate | Votes | % |
|---|---|---|---|
| Liberal | Paul-Léandre Marcotte | 958 | 51.39 |
| Conservative | Séverin Dumais | 906 | 48.61 |
| Total valid votes | | 1,864 | 98.99 |
| Total rejected ballots | | 19 | 1.01 |
| Turnout | | 1,883 | 99.84 |
| Electors on the lists | | 1,886 | – |

== See also ==
- List of Quebec provincial electoral districts
- Canadian provincial electoral districts
