= Joseph-Alfred Dion =

Canadian politician

Member of Parliament for Lake St-John—Roberval
- In office June 1945 – June 1949
- Preceded by: Armand Sylvestre
- Succeeded by: riding dissolved

Member of Parliament for Roberval
- In office June 1949 – April 1952

Personal details
- Born: 21 March 1897 Île-Verte, Quebec
- Died: 30 November 1957 (aged 60)
- Party: Liberal; Independent Liberal
- Spouse(s): Gertrude Foisy m. 10 September 1925
- Profession: lawyer

Joseph-Alfred Dion (21 March 1897 – 30 November 1957) was an independent then Liberal party member of the House of Commons of Canada. He was born in Île-Verte, Quebec and became a lawyer by career.

Dion was educated at Ste-Anne-de-la-Pocatière, and at Université Laval where he received his LLB degree.

He was first elected to Parliament at the Lake St-John—Roberval riding as an Independent Liberal candidate in the 1945 general election. He and several other Quebec Liberals had broken with their party the year before during the Conscription Crisis of 1944, quitting the party in order to oppose the government's decision to deploy National Resources Mobilization Act conscripts overseas. Previously, conscripts had only been used for "home defence" and kept within Canada. He subsequently rejoined the party and, after serving his first term in the House of Commons, ridings were realigned and Dion became a candidate in the new Roberval riding where he won in the 1949 federal election as an official Liberal party candidate.

From 1949 to 1952, he was the House of Commons' Deputy Speaker. On 8 April 1952, Dion resigned his Parliamentary seat when he was appointed a puisne judge of the Superior Court of Quebec.
