= Lac-Saint-Jean =

Federal electoral district in Quebec, Canada

Quebec electoral district
- Interactive map of riding boundaries from the 2025 federal election

Federal electoral district
- Legislature: House of Commons
MP
Alexis Brunelle-Duceppe
Bloc Québécois
- District created: 1924
- First contested: 1925
- Last contested: 2025
- District webpage: profile, map

Demographics
- Population (2021): 103,886
- Electors (2021): 84,695
- Area (km²): 555,366.57
- Pop. density (per km²): 0.19
- Census division(s): Le Domaine-du-Roy, Lac-Saint-Jean-Est, Maria-Chapdelaine
- Census subdivision(s): Alma, Dolbeau-Mistassini, Saint-Félicien, Roberval, Métabetchouan-Lac-à-la-Croix, Normandin, Saint-Prime, Albanel, Saint-Gédéon, Mashteuiatsh

Lac-Saint-Jean (French: [lak sɛ̃ ʒɑ̃], Quebec French pronunciation: [lak sẽ ʒã]) is a federal electoral district in the Saguenay–Lac-Saint-Jean region, northeast Quebec, Canada, that was represented in the House of Commons of Canada from 1925 to 2004, and has been represented since 2015.

== Demographics ==
According to the 2021 Canadian census

Ethnocultural groups: 92% White, 6.9% Indigenous
Languages: 98.5% French
Religions: 83.3% Christian (76.3% Catholic), 16.2% No Religion
Median income: $38,800 (2020)

== History ==
This riding was created in 1924 form parts of Chicoutimi—Saguenay riding and was originally named in English Lake St. John. It originally consisted of the counties of Lake St. John East and Lake St. John West. It was renamed Lake St-John—Roberval in 1935.

The 1947 redistribution created a new riding with the name Lac-Saint-Jean (in English and French), created from parts of the Lake St-John—Roberval riding. It was initially defined to consist of the county of Lake St. John East and the towns of Riverbend, Ile Maligne and St. Joseph-d'Alma; and parts of the county of Lake St. John West.

In 1966, it was redefined to consist of the City of Alma, the Town of Desbiens, the County of Lac-Saint-Jean East, and parts of the Counties of Lac-Saint-Jean West and Chicoutimi.

In 1976, it was redefined to consist of the Cities of Alma and Chicoutimi North, and parts of the Counties of Chicoutimi and Lac-Saint-Jean East.

In 1987, it was redefined to consist of the towns of Alma, Desbiens and Métabetchouan; the County of Lac-Saint-Jean-Est; and parts of the Counties of Chicoutimi, Charlevoix-Ouest, Lac-Saint-Jean-Ouest and Montmorency.

In 1996, it was redefined to consist of the towns of Alma, Desbiens and Métabetchouan; the County Regional Municipality of Lac-Saint-Jean-Est; and parts of in the County Regional Municipality of Le Fjord-du-Saguenay.

Its name was changed in 2000 to "Lac-Saint-Jean—Saguenay".

In 2003, it was abolished when it was redistributed into Chicoutimi—Le Fjord, Jonquière—Alma and Roberval ridings.

The 2012 electoral redistribution saw this riding re-created from parts of Roberval—Lac-Saint-Jean and Jonquière—Alma.

A by-election was held on October 23, 2017, due to the resignation of Denis Lebel on August 9, 2017. The riding was subsequently won by Liberal Richard Hébert.

Following the 2022 Canadian federal electoral redistribution, the riding lost the municipalities of Hébertville, Hébertville-Station, L'Ascension-de-Notre-Seigneur, Saint-Augustin, Saint-Bruno, Sainte-Jeanne-d'Arc, Saint-Eugène-d'Argentenay, Saint-Ludger-de-Milot and Saint-Stanislas as well as the Passes-Dangereuses unorganized area to Jonquière.

=== Members of Parliament ===
This riding has elected the following members of Parliament:

Parliament	Years	Member	Party
Lake St. John; Riding created from Chicoutimi—Saguenay
15th	1925–1926	Armand Sylvestre	Liberal
16th	1926–1930	Armand Sylvestre	Liberal
17th	1930–1935	Joseph-Léonard Duguay	Conservative
Lake St-John—Roberval
18th	1935–1940	Armand Sylvestre	Liberal
19th	1940–1945	Armand Sylvestre	Liberal
20th	1945–1949	Joseph-Alfred Dion	Independent Liberal
Lac-Saint-Jean
21st	1949–1953	André Gauthier	Liberal
22nd	1953–1957	André Gauthier	Liberal
23rd	1957–1958	André Gauthier	Liberal
24th	1958–1962	Roger Parizeau	Progressive Conservative
25th	1962–1963	Marcel Lessard	Social Credit
26th	1963–1965	Marcel Lessard	Social Credit
27th	1965–1968	Alcide Simard	Ralliement créditiste
28th	1968–1972	Marcel Lessard	Liberal
29th	1972–1974	Marcel Lessard	Liberal
30th	1974–1979	Marcel Lessard	Liberal
31st	1979–1980	Marcel Lessard	Liberal
32nd	1980–1984	Pierre Gimaïel	Liberal
33rd	1984–1988	Clément M. Côté	Progressive Conservative
33rd	1988–1988	Lucien Bouchard	Progressive Conservative
34th	1988–1990	Lucien Bouchard	Progressive Conservative
34th	1990–1991	Lucien Bouchard	Independent
34th	1991–1993	Lucien Bouchard	Bloc Québécois
35th	1993–1996	Lucien Bouchard	Bloc Québécois
35th	1996–1997	Stéphan Tremblay	Bloc Québécois
36th	1997–2000	Stéphan Tremblay	Bloc Québécois
Lac-Saint-Jean—Saguenay
37th	2000–2002	Stéphan Tremblay	Bloc Québécois
37th	2002–2004	Sébastien Gagnon	Bloc Québécois
Riding dissolved into Chicoutimi—Le Fjord, Jonquière—Alma, and Roberval—Lac-Saint-Jean
Lac-Saint-Jean; Riding re-created from Roberval—Lac-Saint-Jean and Jonquière—Alma
42nd	2015–2017	Denis Lebel	Conservative
42nd	2017–2019	Richard Hébert	Liberal
43rd	2019–2021	Alexis Brunelle-Duceppe	Bloc Québécois
44th	2021–2025	Alexis Brunelle-Duceppe	Bloc Québécois
45th	2025–present	Alexis Brunelle-Duceppe	Bloc Québécois

== Election results ==
=== Lac-Saint-Jean, 2015–present ===
Graph of election results in Lac-Saint-Jean since 2011 (parties that never received 2% of the vote are omitted)

2025 Canadian federal election
Party	Candidate	Votes	%	±%	Expenditures
Bloc Québécois	Alexis Brunelle-Duceppe	22,069	46.21	−4.69	
Liberal	Denis Lemieux	12,536	26.25	+7.28	
Conservative	Dave Blackburn	11,792	24.69	−0.58	
New Democratic	Hugues Boily-Maltais	819	1.71	−1.56	
People's	Lorie Bouchard	540	1.13	N/A	
Total valid votes/expense limit		47,756	98.58		
Total rejected ballots		689	1.42		
Turnout		48,445	64.14		
Eligible voters		75,528			
Bloc Québécois notional hold		Swing		−5.99	
Source: Elections Canada
Note: number of eligible voters does not include voting day registrations.

2021 federal election redistributed results
Party	Vote	%
Bloc Québécois	22,662	50.90
Conservative	11,249	25.27
Liberal	8,444	18.97
New Democratic	1,454	3.27
Green	712	1.60

2021 Canadian federal election
Party	Candidate	Votes	%	±%	Expenditures
Bloc Québécois	Alexis Brunelle-Duceppe	25,466	50.7	+6.7	$38,464.04
Conservative	Serge Bergeron	12,899	25.7	+2.6	$32,221.37
Liberal	Marjolaine Étienne	9,371	18.7	-6.4	$6,716.26
New Democratic	Mathieu Chambers	1,637	3.3	-1.8	$0.48
Green	Annie Thibault	824	1.6	-0.3	$0.00
Total valid votes/expense limit		50,197	97.6	–	$142,430.64
Total rejected ballots		1,215	2.4		
Turnout		51,412	60.7		
Registered voters		84,695			
Bloc Québécois hold		Swing		+2.1	
Source: Elections Canada

2019 Canadian federal election
Party	Candidate	Votes	%	±%	Expenditures
Bloc Québécois	Alexis Brunelle-Duceppe	23,839	43.96	+20.59	$33,354.37
Liberal	Richard Hébert	13,633	25.14	-13.45	$83,673.06
Conservative	Jocelyn Fradette	12,544	23.13	-1.88	$41,607.93
New Democratic	Jean-Simon Fortin	2,753	5.08	-6.63	none listed
Green	Julie Gagnon-Bond	1,010	1.86	+0.55	$0.00
People's	Dany Boudreault	448	0.9	New	none listed
Total valid votes/expense limit		53,971	97.87		
Total rejected ballots		1,155	2.13		
Turnout		55,382	63.9		
Eligible voters		84,456			
Bloc Québécois gain from Liberal		Swing		+17.02	
Source: Elections Canada

Canadian federal by-election, October 23, 2017 Resignation of Denis Lebel
Party	Candidate	Votes	%	±%	Expenditures
Liberal	Richard Hébert	13,442	38.59	+20.15	
Conservative	Rémy Leclerc	8,710	25.01	-8.26	
Bloc Québécois	Marc Maltais	8,141	23.37	+5.00	
New Democratic	Gisèle Dallaire	4,079	11.71	-16.75	
Green	Yves Laporte	457	1.31	-0.15	
Total valid votes/Expense limit		34,829	98.67		$133,786.71
Total rejected ballots		469	1.33		
Turnout		35,298	41.61		
Eligible voters		84,829			
Liberal gain from Conservative		Swing		+14.20	
Source: Elections Canada

2015 Canadian federal election
Party	Candidate	Votes	%	±%	Expenditures
Conservative	Denis Lebel	18,393	33.27	-8.99	$144,196.85
New Democratic	Gisèle Dallaire	15,735	28.46	-3.67	$90,827.25
Liberal	Sabin Simard	10,193	18.44	+15.19	$8,743.01
Bloc Québécois	Sabin Gaudreault	10,152	18.37	-2.64	$31,823.52
Green	Laurence Requilé	806	1.46	+0.12	–
Total valid votes/Expense limit		55,279	98.35		$278,724.96
Total rejected ballots		925	1.65	–	
Turnout		56,204	65.78	–	
Eligible voters		85,445			
Conservative notional hold		Swing		-2.66	
Source: Elections Canada

2011 federal election redistributed results
Party	Vote	%
Conservative	22,945	42.26
New Democratic	17,446	32.14
Bloc Québécois	11,403	21.00
Liberal	1,766	3.25
Green	729	1.34

=== Lac-Saint-Jean—Saguenay, 2000–2004 ===
Canadian federal by-election, 9 December 2002 On the resignation of Stéphan Tremblay, 7 May 2002
Party	Candidate	Votes	%	±%
Bloc Québécois	Sébastien Gagnon	8,912	48.18	-17.99
Liberal	Gilbert Tremblay	7,594	41.06	+17.75
Independent	Gilles Lavoie	532	2.88	+0.06
Independent	Richard Harvey	467	2.52	
Progressive Conservative	Clermont Gauthier	434	2.35	+0.69
Alliance	Alcide Boudreault	290	1.57	-3.18
New Democratic	Yanick Auer	267	1.44	+0.15
Total valid votes		18,831	98.22	
Total rejected ballots		335	1.78	-0.90
Turnout		18,831	35.56	-27.24
Eligible voters		52,963		
Bloc Québécois hold		Swing		-17.87
Source: Elections Canada

2000 Canadian federal election
Party	Candidate	Votes	%	±%
Bloc Québécois	Stéphan Tremblay	21,391	66.17	+2.64
Liberal	Jérôme Tremblay	7,536	23.31	+2.31
Alliance	Yannick Caron	1,536	4.75	
Independent	Gilles Lavoie	912	2.82	
Progressive Conservative	Claude Gagnon	535	1.65	-12.66
New Democratic	Linda Proulx	417	1.29	+0.13
Total valid votes		32,237	97.32	
Total rejected ballots		890	2.68	+0.01
Turnout		33,217	62.80	-5.15
Eligible voters		52,895		
Bloc Québécois hold		Swing		+0.16
Source: Elections Canada

=== Lac-Saint-Jean, 1949–2000 ===
1997 Canadian federal election
Party	Candidate	Votes	%
Bloc Québécois	Stéphan Tremblay	21,506	63.53
Liberal	Clément Lajoie	7,109	21.00
Progressive Conservative	Sabin Simard	4,845	14.31
New Democratic	Jean-François Morval	391	1.16
Total valid votes/Expense limit		33,851	97.33
Total rejected ballots		929	2.67
Turnout		34,780	67.95
Eligible voters		51,184	

Canadian federal by-election, 25 March 1996 On the resignation of Lucien Bouchard, 15 January 1996
Party	Candidate	Votes	%	±%
Bloc Québécois	Stéphan Tremblay	20,777	76.56	+1.04
Liberal	Clément Lajoie	5,846	21.54	+6.93
Progressive Conservative	Philippe Harris	205	0.76	-7.89
Reform	Denis Simard	175	0.64	New
New Democratic	Karl Bélanger	136	0.50	-0.73
Total valid votes		27,139	99.47	
Total rejected ballots		144	0.53	
Turnout		27,283	54.87	
Eligible voters		49,726		
Bloc Québécois hold		Swing		-2.95
Source: Elections Canada

1993 Canadian federal election
Party	Candidate	Votes	%
Bloc Québécois	Lucien Bouchard	27,209	75.52
Liberal	Noël Girard	5,263	14.61
Progressive Conservative	Denise Falardeau	3,115	8.65
New Democratic	Marie D. Jalbert	444	1.23
Total valid votes		36,031	99.47

1988 Canadian federal election
Party	Candidate	Votes
Progressive Conservative	Lucien Bouchard	23,112
New Democratic	Jean Paradis	6,348
Liberal	Bertrand Bouchard	5,390

Canadian federal by-election, 20 June 1988 On the resignation of Clément Côté, 28 April 1988
Party	Candidate	Votes
Progressive Conservative	Lucien Bouchard	16,951
Liberal	Pierre Gimaïel	10,746
New Democratic	Jean Paradis	2,903
Independent	Jolly Taylor	113

1984 Canadian federal election
Party	Candidate	Votes
Progressive Conservative	Clément Coté	25,270
Liberal	Pierre Gimaïel	12,683
New Democratic	Claude Gagnon	2,132
Parti nationaliste	Yves Courville	813

1980 Canadian federal election
Party	Candidate	Votes
Liberal	Pierre Gimaïel	21,267
Progressive Conservative	Lucien Fortin	4,608
New Democratic	Jean-Denis Bérubé	3,465
Social Credit	Paul-Henri Tremblay	2,821
Rhinoceros	Béru Louis Briand	1,159
Union populaire	Richard Fecteau	252

1979 Canadian federal election
Party	Candidate	Votes
Liberal	Marcel Lessard	18,978
Social Credit	Ph.-Aug. Bouchard	11,048
Progressive Conservative	Oswald Fleury	3,251
New Democratic	Jean-Denis Bérubé	1,589
Rhinoceros	Marc Harvey	802
Union populaire	Guy Tremblay	421

1974 Canadian federal election
Party	Candidate	Votes
Liberal	Marcel Lessard	11,162
Progressive Conservative	Gilles Guay	6,129
Social Credit	Maurice Brodeur	5,372
New Democratic	Jacqueline Simard	625

1972 Canadian federal election
Party	Candidate	Votes
Liberal	Marcel Lessard	11,165
Progressive Conservative	Gilles Guay	7,074
Social Credit	Claude Gauthier	5,203
Independent	Claude Gagnon	362

1968 Canadian federal election
Party	Candidate	Votes
Liberal	Marcel Lessard	9,325
Ralliement créditiste	J.-Alcide Simard	8,430
New Democratic	Jean-Jacques Tremblay	1,330
Progressive Conservative	Raoul Savard	1,034

1965 Canadian federal election
Party	Candidate	Votes
Ralliement créditiste	Alcide Simard	5,642
Liberal	Réal Harvey	5,337
Independent	Marcel Lessard	4,736
New Democratic	Fernand Coté	1,477
Progressive Conservative	Vianney Guilmette	532

1963 Canadian federal election
Party	Candidate	Votes
Social Credit	Marcel Lessard	9,318
Liberal	Réal Harvey	6,219
New Democratic	Rachel Ouellet	1,524
Progressive Conservative	Gilles De Beaumont	1,373

1962 Canadian federal election
Party	Candidate	Votes
Social Credit	Marcel Lessard	10,743
Liberal	Benoît Caron	4,018
Progressive Conservative	Roger Parizeau	3,341
New Democratic	Jean-Claude Lebel	935

1958 Canadian federal election
Party	Candidate	Votes
Progressive Conservative	Roger Parizeau	8,255
Liberal	André Gauthier	7,353
Co-operative Commonwealth	Gérard Larouche	2,120

1957 Canadian federal election
Party	Candidate	Votes
Liberal	André Gauthier	10,129
Progressive Conservative	Aimé-Roger Parizeau	6,374

1953 Canadian federal election
Party	Candidate	Votes
Liberal	André Gauthier	8,697
Progressive Conservative	Dominique Lapointe	6,756

1949 Canadian federal election
Party	Candidate	Votes
Liberal	André Gauthier	7,084
Nationalist	Paul-Emile Harvey	4,994
Union des électeurs	Delphis Larouche	824
Progressive Conservative	Jean-Charles Gosselin	138

=== Lake St-John—Roberval, 1935–1949 ===
1945 Canadian federal election
Party	Candidate	Votes
Independent Liberal	Joseph-Alfred Dion	9,744
Independent	Joseph-Léonard Duguay	8,984
Bloc populaire	Paul-Emile Harvey	4,588
Social Credit	Delphis Larouche	1,134

1940 Canadian federal election
Party	Candidate	Votes
Liberal	Armand Sylvestre	10,057
National Government	Joseph-Léonard Duguay	6,895
New Democracy	Louis Even	3,698
Independent Liberal	Joseph-O. Dumoulin	717

1935 Canadian federal election
Party	Candidate	Votes
Liberal	Armand Sylvestre	9,231
Conservative	Joseph-Léonard Duguay	9,069
Reconstruction	Joseph-Ladislas Bolduc	661
Independent Liberal	Joseph-Arthur Hamel	544

=== Lake St. John, 1925–1935 ===
1930 Canadian federal election
Party	Candidate	Votes
Conservative	Joseph-Léonard Duguay	8,387
Liberal	Armand Sylvestre	8,211

1926 Canadian federal election
Party	Candidate	Votes
Liberal	Armand Sylvestre	8,090
Conservative	Joseph-Sylvio-Narcisse Turcotte	5,733

1925 Canadian federal election
Party	Candidate	Votes
Liberal	Armand Sylvestre	7,579
Conservative	Joseph-Sylvio-Narcisse Turcotte	5,502

== See also ==
- List of Canadian electoral districts
- Historical federal electoral districts of Canada
