= André Gauthier (politician) =

Canadian politician

Member of Parliament for Lac-Saint-Jean
- In office June 1949 – March 1958
- Preceded by: riding created
- Succeeded by: Roger Parizeau

Personal details
- Born: 6 February 1915 L'Ascension, Lac-Saint-Jean, Quebec
- Died: 24 May 1994 (aged 79) Saint-Augustin-de-Desmaures
- Party: Liberal
- Spouse(s): Germaine Gauthier (m. 2 Aug 1941)
- Children: Nicole, Diane, and Martine
- Profession: lawyer

André Gauthier (6 February 1915 – 24 May 1994) was a Canadian lawyer and politician. Gauthier was a Liberal party member of the House of Commons of Canada.

Born in L'Ascension, Lac-Saint-Jean, Quebec, Gauthier was first elected at the Lac-Saint-Jean riding in the 1949 general election. Gauthier was re-elected for successive terms there in 1953 and 1957 then defeated by Roger Parizeau of the Progressive Conservative party in the 1958 election.
