= Alexis Brunelle-Duceppe =

Canadian politician

Alexis Brunelle-Duceppe MP

Member of Parliament for Lac-Saint-Jean
- Incumbent
- Assumed office October 21, 2019
- Preceded by: Richard Hébert

Personal details
- Born: July 1, 1979 (age 47) Montreal, Quebec
- Party: Bloc Québécois
- Parent(s): Gilles Duceppe (father); Yolande Brunelle (mother)

Alexis Brunelle-Duceppe MP (born July 1, 1979) is a Canadian politician, who was elected to the House of Commons of Canada in the 2019 election. He represents the electoral district of Lac-Saint-Jean as a member of the Bloc Québécois.

== Political career ==
He served as the critic of immigration, refugees, citizenship and human rights in the Bloc Québécois Shadow Cabinet of the 44th Parliament of Canada.

In March 2021, the MP was banned from visiting China and Russia. The ban was imposed by China on Canadian parliamentarians after they passed a motion to recognize the genocide of China's Muslim minorities: the Uyghurs and other Turkic Muslims.

The motion was amended by the Bloc Québécois to include a request that the 2022 Winter Olympics in Beijing be moved.

At the World Uyghur Congress in Prague in November 2021, Brunelle-Duceppe presented a resolution, unanimously adopted by Uyghurs from 19 countries and political observers from ten countries (including the USA, Germany, France and England), to request that the International Olympic Committee and its national committees postpone the 2022 Winter Olympics in order to leave the field clear for an international observation mission from the United Nations and thus avoid holding what he described as the “Games of Shame” in an open letter signed by almost 30 people, including Liberal, Conservative, New Democrat and Green Party elected representatives, as well as public figures such as former Olympic champion Jean-Luc Brassard.

In June 2024, the Parliament of Canada passed a unanimous motion in the House of Commons calling for Tibet’s right to self-determination. The motion refers to Tibetans as “people and a nation” with the right to choose their own social, economic, cultural, and religious policies, including the selection of the next Dalai Lama. The motion was sponsored by the Bloc Quebecois and introduced in the House by Brunelle-Duceppe.

In November 2024, after reporting revealed that an Iranian assassination attempt against former Montreal Liberal MP Irwin Cotler had been stopped, Brunelle-Duceppe introduced a motion condemning the attack, which was adopted by unanimous consent of the House.

He was re-elected for the third time in the 2025 election with 46.2% of the vote and a majority of more than 9,500 voices. He then became the spokesperson for foreign affairs and international development, while keeping his responsibilities as critic of immigration, refugees, citizenship and human rights for the Bloc Québécois. He was also elected vice chair of the Canadian House of Commons Standing Committee on Citizenship and Immigration and the Canadian House of Commons Standing Committee on Foreign Affairs and International Development in the 45th Canadian Parliament in 2025.

=== Francophone African students ===
Alexis Brunelle-Duceppe is behind the consultations conducted by the Chambre des communes Standing Committee on Citizenship and Immigration on the massive refusal of students from Francophone Africa.

=== CUSMA negotiations ===
In early 2020, Bloc Québécois MP Alexis Brunelle-Duceppe denounced the difference in treatment obtained by steel and aluminum in the negotiations surrounding the ratification process of the Canada-United States-Mexico Agreement (CUSMA), while the Bloc Québécois submitted a proposal to the Liberal government to offer better protection to Quebec-produced aluminum.

== Personal life ==
He is the son of former party leader Gilles Duceppe.

== Mission in Support of Afghan Women Parliamentarians ==
Alexis Brunelle-Duceppe joined other federal elected officials in a bipartisan effort to evacuate former Afghan female lawmakers and their families—who were under threat from the Taliban—to Canada.

== Electoral record ==
2025 Canadian federal election: Lac-Saint-Jean
Party	Candidate	Votes	%	±%	Expenditures
Bloc Québécois	Alexis Brunelle-Duceppe	22,069	46.21	−4.69	$34,930.27
Liberal	Denis Lemieux	12,536	26.25	+7.28	$9,089.81
Conservative	Dave Blackburn	11,792	24.69	−0.58	$21,827.74
New Democratic	Hugues Boily-Maltais	819	1.71	−1.56	$427.43
People's	Lorie Bouchard	540	1.13	N/A	$1,241.73
Total valid votes/expense limit		47,756	98.58	–	$145,851.79
Total rejected ballots		689	1.42		
Turnout		48,445	64.14		
Eligible voters		75,528			
Bloc Québécois notional hold		Swing		−5.99	
Source: Elections Canada
Note: number of eligible voters does not include voting day registrations.

2021 Canadian federal election: Lac-Saint-Jean
Party	Candidate	Votes	%	±%	Expenditures
Bloc Québécois	Alexis Brunelle-Duceppe	25,466	50.7	+6.7	$38,464.04
Conservative	Serge Bergeron	12,899	25.7	+2.6	$32,221.37
Liberal	Marjolaine Étienne	9,371	18.7	-6.4	$6,716.26
New Democratic	Mathieu Chambers	1,637	3.3	-1.8	$0.48
Green	Annie Thibault	824	1.6	-0.3	$0.00
Total valid votes/expense limit		50,197	97.6	–	$142,430.64
Total rejected ballots		1,215	2.4		
Turnout		51,412	60.7		
Registered voters		84,695			
Bloc Québécois hold		Swing		+2.1	
Source: Elections Canada

2019 Canadian federal election: Lac-Saint-Jean
Party	Candidate	Votes	%	±%	Expenditures
Bloc Québécois	Alexis Brunelle-Duceppe	23,839	43.96	+20.59	$33,354.37
Liberal	Richard Hébert	13,633	25.14	-13.45	$83,673.06
Conservative	Jocelyn Fradette	12,544	23.13	-1.88	$41,607.93
New Democratic	Jean-Simon Fortin	2,753	5.08	-6.63	none listed
Green	Julie Gagnon-Bond	1,010	1.86	+0.55	$0.00
People's	Dany Boudreault	448	0.9	New	none listed
Total valid votes/expense limit		53,971	97.87		
Total rejected ballots		1,155	2.13		
Turnout		55,382	63.9		
Eligible voters		84,456			
Bloc Québécois gain from Liberal		Swing		+17.02	
Source: Elections Canada
