= Pierre Gimaïel =

Canadian politician

Pierre J.J. Georges Adelard Gimaïel (born 6 June 1949 in Metabetchouan, Quebec) was a Liberal party member of the House of Commons of Canada. He was a manpower consultant and development manager by career.

He won only one term of office in the 32nd Canadian Parliament after winning the Lac-Saint-Jean riding in the 1980 federal election. Gimaïel was defeated in his campaigns during the 1984 and 1988 federal election.
