= Saint-Bruno, Quebec =

Saint-Bruno
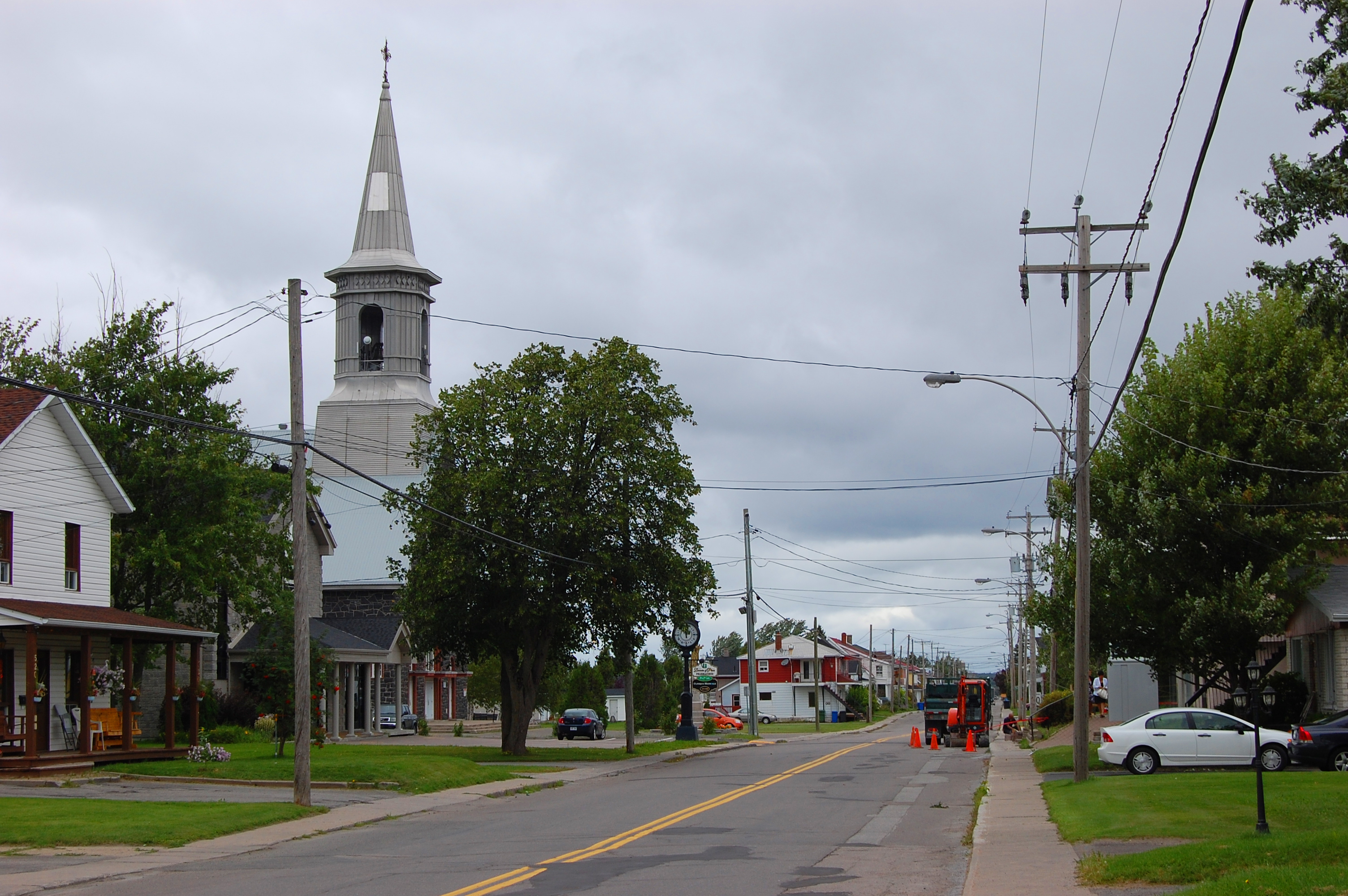

- Location in Saguenay–Lac-Saint-Jean Quebec.
- Coordinates: 48°28′N 71°39′W
- Country: Canada
- Province: Quebec
- Region: Saguenay–Lac-Saint-Jean
- RCM: Lac-Saint-Jean-Est
- Constituted: July 12, 1975

Government
  - Federal riding: Jonquière
  - Prov. riding: Lac-Saint-Jean

Area
  - Total: 76.50 km^{2} (29.54 sq mi)
  - Land: 77.92 km^{2} (30.09 sq mi)
- There is an apparent contradiction between two authoritative sources

Population (2011)
  - Total: 2,636
  - Density: 33.8/km^{2} (88/sq mi)
  - Pop 2006-2011: ▲12.0%
  - Dwellings: 1,041
- Time zone: UTC−5 (EST)
  - Summer (DST): UTC−4 (EDT)
- Postal code(s): J3V
- Area codes: 418 and 581
- Highways: R-169; R-170
- Website: www.ville.saint-bruno.qc.ca

For other places named Saint-Bruno in Quebec, see Saint Bruno (disambiguation).

Saint-Bruno (French pronunciation: [sɛ̃ bʁyno]) is a former municipality in Quebec, located within the regional county municipality of Lac-Saint-Jean-Est. In 2026, the municipality was merged with Hébertville.

The municipality had a population of 2,636 as of the Canada 2011 Census.

== Economy ==
Bombardier Transportation has a minor engineering facility located in Saint-Bruno.

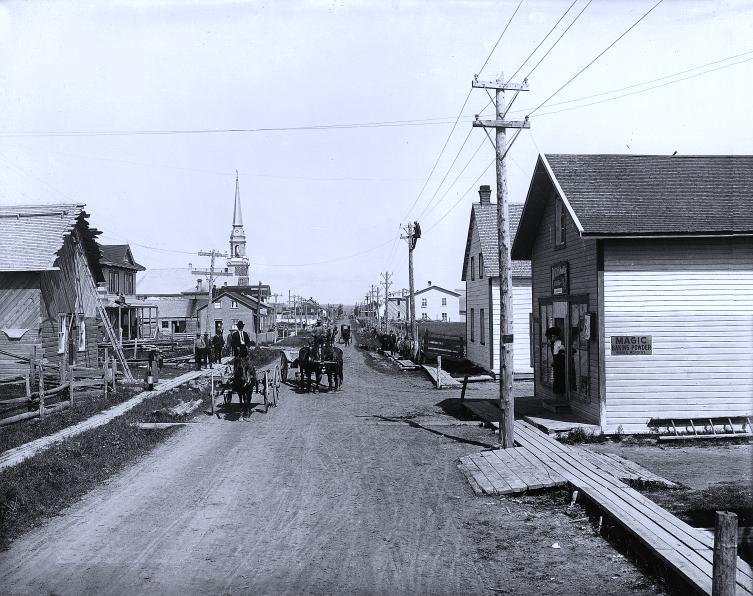
Saint-Bruno in 1906

== See also ==
- List of municipalities in Quebec
