= Saint-Nazaire, Quebec =

Saint-Nazaire
- Municipality
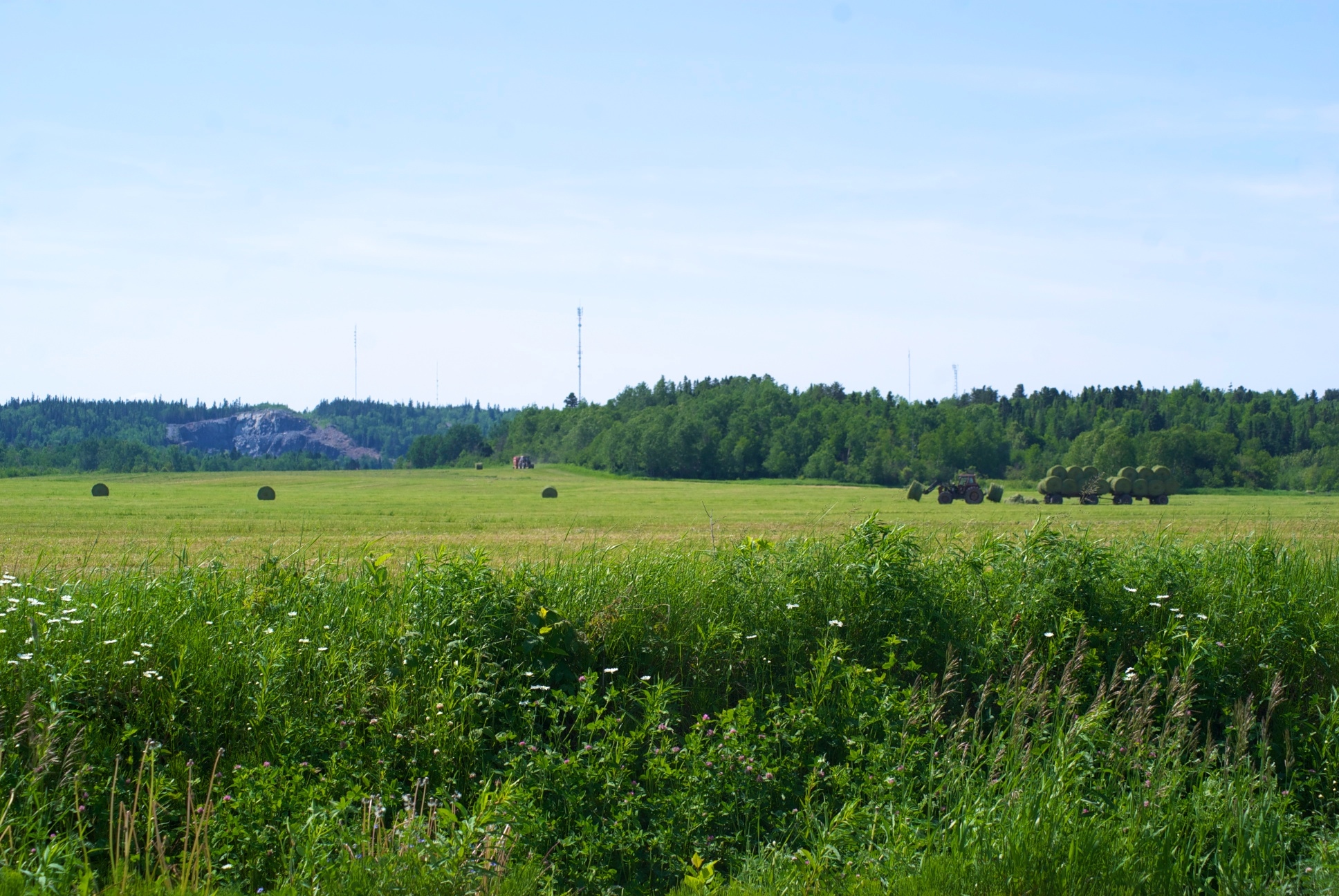
- Motto: "Plus haut, plus loin" (French for, "Higher, further")

- Location in Saguenay–Lac-Saint-Jean Quebec
- Coordinates: 48°35′N 71°32′W
- Country: Canada
- Province: Quebec
- Region: Saguenay–Lac-Saint-Jean
- RCM: Lac-Saint-Jean-Est
- Settled: 1891
- Constituted: September 23, 1905

Government
  - Mayor: Johanne Lavoie
  - Federal riding: Jonquière—Hébertville—Pays-des-Bleuets
  - Prov. riding: Lac-Saint-Jean

Area
  - Total: 144.80 km^{2} (55.91 sq mi)
  - Land: 144.76 km^{2} (55.89 sq mi)

Population (2021)
  - Total: 2,029
  - Density: 14/km^{2} (36/sq mi)
  - Pop 2016-2021: ▼2.1%
  - Dwellings: 869
- Time zone: UTC−5 (EST)
  - Summer (DST): UTC−4 (EDT)
- Postal code(s): G0W 2V0
- Area codes: 418 and 581
- Highways: R-172
- Website: www.ville.saint-nazaire.qc.ca

Saint-Nazaire (French pronunciation: [sɛ̃ nazɛʁ]) is a municipality in Quebec, Canada.

== Demographics ==
Population trend:

- Population in 2021: 2,029 (2016 to 2021 population change: -2.1%)
- Population in 2016: 2,073
- Population in 2011: 2,114
- Population in 2006: 1,866
- Population in 2001: 2,028
- Population in 1996: 2,095
- Population in 1991: 2,024
- Population in 1986: 2,025
- Population in 1981: 2,079
- Population in 1976: 1,820
- Population in 1971: 1,878
- Population in 1966: 1,924
- Population in 1961: 1,916
- Population in 1956: 1,775
- Population in 1951: 2,159
- Population in 1941: 1,677
- Population in 1931: 1,143
- Population in 1921: 781
- Population in 1911: 475

Private dwellings occupied by usual residents: 835 (total dwellings: 869)

Mother tongue:

- English as first language: 0.2%
- French as first language: 99.3%
- English and French as first language: 0.0%
- Other as first language: 0.2%

== See also ==
- List of municipalities in Quebec
