= Rivière à l'Ours =

Rivière à l'Ours may refer to:

- Rivière à l'Ours (Témiscamingue), a tributary of the Ottawa River in Les Lacs-du-Témiscamingue, Quebec, Canada
- Rivière à l'Ours (rivière des Aulnaies), a tributary of rivière des Aulnaies in Saint-Ambroise, Quebec, Canada
- Rivière de l'Ours (former name: "Bear River"), a tributary of the Gulf of St. Lawrence in L'Île-d'Anticosti, Quebec, Canada
- Rivière aux Ours (Sainte-Anne River tributary), a tributary of the Sainte-Anne River in Saint-Urbain, Quebec, Canada
- Rivière à l'Ours (Ashuapmushuan River tributary), a tributary of Ashuapmushuan River in Lac-Ashuapmushuan, Quebec, Canada
- Rivière à l'Ours (Minganie), a tributary of the Gulf of St. Lawrence in Havre-Saint-Pierre, Quebec, Canada
- Rivière à l'Ours Ouest, a tributary of rivière à l'Ours in Havre-Saint-Pierre, Quebec, Canada

== See also ==
- Petite rivière à l'Ours (rivière à l'Ours) - West, a tributary of rivière à l'Ours in Saint-Félicien, Quebec, Canada
- Petite rivière à l'Ours (Témiscamingue), a tributary of the Ottawa River in Les Lacs-du-Témiscamingue, Quebec, Canada
- Petite rivière à l'Ours (rivière à l'Ours) - South, a tributary of the Bear River in Sainte-Hedwidge, Quebec, Canada
