= Iroquois (disambiguation) =

The Iroquois, or Haudenosaunee, are an indigenous people of North America.

Iroquois may also refer to:

== Iroquois people ==
- Iroquoian peoples, those who speak Iroquoian languages
- Iroquois kinship, a system of familial comprehension that originated with the Iroquois tribes
- Iroquoian languages
- Seven Nations of Canada, another confederation that was referred to as 'the Iroquois Confederacy'

== Places ==
=== Antarctica ===
- Iroquois Plateau

=== Canada ===
- Iroquois, Ontario
- Iroquois Falls, Ontario

=== United States ===
- Iroquois, Illinois
- Iroquois County, Illinois
- Iroquois, Louisville, Kentucky
- Iroquois, South Dakota
- Iroquois, West Virginia
- Iroquois Township (disambiguation)

== Geology ==
- Glacial Lake Iroquois, a prehistoric, proglacial lake in present-day Ontario and New York State

== Military ==
- UH-1 Iroquois, United States Army utility helicopter nicknamed the "Huey"
- HMCS Iroquois, the name of two Canadian warships
- Orenda Iroquois, a turbojet engine for military use developed by Orenda Aerospace

== Other ==
- Iroquois Central School District, a public school district in New York State
- Iroquois (di Suvero), an outdoor sculpture in Philadelphia, Pennsylvania, US
- Iroquois (horse) (1878–1899), first American-bred to win the Epsom Derby
- Iroquois Pliskin, also known as Solid Snake, from the Metal Gear series of video games
- Iroquois Theater Fire in Chicago, 1903
- Iroquois River (disambiguation), including Rivière des Iroquois
- SS Iroquois and USS Iroquois, several ships
