= Deuxième bras des Iroquois =

Location
- Country: Canada
- Province: Quebec
- Region: Saguenay-Lac-Saint-Jean
- MRC: Le Domaine-du-Roy Regional County Municipality
- TNO or Municipality: Roberval

Physical characteristics
- Source: Confluence of several forest strea30
  - location: Sainte-Hedwidge
  - coordinates: 48°23′25″N 72°30′26″W
  - elevation: 377 m (1,237 ft)
- Mouth: Lac Saint-Jean
  - location: Saint-Prime
  - coordinates: 48°31′25″N 72°26′26″W
  - elevation: 220 m (720 ft)
- Length: 12.3 km (7.6 mi)

Basin features
- Progression: Iroquois River, Lac Saint-Jean, Saguenay River
- Tributaries
  - left: (upstream) outlet of the Lac de la Bonne Femme, outlet of the Lac de la Chute, outlet of the Lac à Mouche, outlet of the Indian Lake, outlet of the Chanceux lakes and an unidentified lake, stream (coming from the southwest), outlet of the calm lakes and Sacred Heart.
  - right: (upstream) stream (coming from the southeast), stream (coming from the south), outlet of Lac Rat Musique, outlet of lakes Jeannine and Jerry.

The Deuxième bras des Iroquois (French pronunciation: [døzjɛm bʁa dez‿iʁɔkwa], Second Arm of the Iroquois) is a tributary of the Iroquois River, flowing in the unorganized territory of Lac-Ashuapmushuan and municipality of Sainte-Hedwidge, in the Le Domaine-du-Roy Regional County Municipality, in the administrative region of Saguenay–Lac-Saint-Jean, in the province from Quebec, to Canada.

The upper part of the valley of the "Deuxième bras des Iroquois" is served by forest roads; the lower part, by the path of 9th row.

Forestry is the main economic activity in this forest valley; recreotourism activities, second.

The surface of the Deuxième bras des Iroquois is usually frozen from the beginning of December to the end of March, except for the rapids; however, traffic on the ice is generally safe from mid-December to mid-March.

== Geography ==
The Deuxième bras des Iroquois originates from Desmarais Lake (length: 0.7 km (0.43 mi); altitude: 377 m (1,237 ft)) in Sainte-Hedwidge. This lake has two outlets; the other flowing towards the hydrographic slope of Lac aux Iroquois. The northern mouth of Desmarais Lake is located at:

- 1.7 km (1.1 mi) north-west of Lac aux Iroquois which turns out to be the head lake of Rivière aux Iroquois;
- 15.0 km (9.3 mi) south-west of the village center of Sainte-Hedwidge;
- 27.1 km (16.8 mi) south of the mouth of the Iroquois river.

From the north mouth of Lac Desmarais, the Deuxième bras des Iroquois flows over 31.5 km (19.6 mi) with a drop of 157 m (515 ft), according to the following segments:

- 2.1 km (1.3 mi) towards the northwest by collecting the discharge (coming from the south) of lakes Calme and Sacré-Coeur, to the discharge (coming from the east) of lakes Jeannine and Jerry;
- 10.3 km (6.4 mi) generally towards the north by crossing two zones of marshes, by collecting the discharge (coming from the west) of two lakes including Lac Chanceux, and by forming a loop towards the northwest to bypass a mountain and collect the outlet (coming from the northwest) from Lac Poélon and Indien, up to the outlet (coming from the southeast) from Lac Rat Musique. Note: At the end of this segment, the course of the river leaves the zec de la Lièvre;
- 6.0 km (3.7 mi) towards the northwest by entering the unorganized territory of ac-Ashuapmushuan, passing between two mountains, collecting the discharge (coming from the southwest) of the Lake at Mouche, collecting the discharge (coming from the west) from Lac de la Chute, to a bend in the river;
- 5.2 km (3.2 mi) south-east, re-entering Sainte-Hedwidge, up to a bend in the river;
- 6.0 km (3.7 mi) first towards the northeast, then towards the north while winding in the second half of the segment, until the outlet (coming from the southwest) of the Lac de la Bonne Femme;
- 1.9 km (1.2 mi) towards the north, winding up to its mouth.

The Deuxième bras des Iroquois flows into a bend in the river on the west bank of the Rivière aux Iroquois. This confluence is located at:

- 14.0 km (8.7 mi) south-east of the village center of Saint-Félicien;
- 11.9 km (7.4 mi) south-west of the village center of Saint-Prime;
- 15.9 km (9.9 mi) southwest of downtown Roberval.

From the mouth of the Deuxième bras des Iroquois, the current successively descends the course of the Iroquois river on 19.7 km (12.2 mi), crosses Lake Saint-Jean east on 42.5 km (26.4 mi) north-east, take the course of the Saguenay River (via the Petite Décharge) on 1,172.3 km (728.4 mi) east to Tadoussac where it merges with the estuary of Saint Lawrence.

== Toponymy ==
The toponym "Deuxième bras des Iroquois" is linked to that of the head lake and that of the main river designated "Rivière aux Iroquois".

The toponym "Deuxième bras des Iroquois" was formalized on May 11, 1976, at the Place Names Bank of the Commission de toponymie du Québec.
