= Rivière à la Chasse (lac Saint-Jean) =

Location
- Country: Canada
- Province: Quebec
- Region: Saguenay-Lac-Saint-Jean
- MRC: Le Domaine-du-Roy Regional County Municipality
- TNO or Municipality: Roberval

Physical characteristics
- Source: Confluence of several forest strea30
  - location: Sainte-Hedwidge
  - coordinates: 48°30′45″N 72°22′36″W
  - elevation: 270 m (890 ft)
- Mouth: Lac Saint-Jean
  - location: Saint-Prime
  - coordinates: 48°35′00″N 72°18′01″W
  - elevation: 101 m (331 ft)
- Length: 12.3 km (7.6 mi)

Basin features
- Progression: Lac Saint-Jean, Saguenay River
- Tributaries
  - left: (upstream)
  - right: (upstream) stream chez Tanis, unidentified stream

The Rivière à la Chasse (French pronunciation: [ʁivjɛʁ a la ʃas], lit. 'Hunting river') is a tributary of lac Saint-Jean, flowing the municipality of Sainte-Hedwidge and Saint-Prime, in the Le Domaine-du-Roy Regional County Municipality in the administrative region of Saguenay–Lac-Saint-Jean, in the province of Quebec, in Canada.

The upper part of the Rivière à la Chasse valley is served by the 5th range road; the intermediate part, by the 4th row road and the 3rd row road; the lower part via Principale Street.

Forestry is the main economic activity in the upper half of this valley; agriculture, in the lower part.

The surface of the Rivière à la Chasse is usually frozen from the beginning of December to the end of March, except the rapids; however, traffic on the ice is generally safe from mid-December to mid-March.

== Geography ==
The Rivière à la Chasse originates at the confluence of several forest streams (altitude: 270 m (890 ft)) in Sainte-Hedwidge. This source is located at:

- 1.8 km (1.1 mi) west of the course of the Ouiatchouaniche River;
- 3.6 km (2.2 mi) north-west of the village center of Sainte-Hedwidge;
- 10.0 km (6.2 mi) south-west of the mouth of the "rivière à la Chasse".

From its source, the Rivière à la Chasse flows over 12.3 km (7.6 mi) with a drop of 169 m (554 ft), according to the following segments:

- 8.4 km (5.2 mi) towards the north first in the forest zone, then agricultural, to a bend in the river;
- 3.9 km (2.4 mi) towards the northeast in the agricultural zone by crossing the route 169 (rue Principale), collecting the stream at Tanis (coming from the southeast ), and cutting the railroad at the end of the segment, until its mouth.

The Rivière à la Chasse flows on the southwest bank of lac Saint-Jean. This confluence is located between the villages of Saint-Prime and Pointe-Bleue, either:

- 4.9 km (3.0 mi) west of the center of the village of Pointe-Bleue;
- 2.9 km (1.8 mi) east of the village center of Saint-Prime;
- 9.6 km (6.0 mi) northwest of downtown Roberval.

From the mouth of Rivière à la Chasse, the current crosses Lac Saint-Jean to the east for 39.5 km (24.5 mi) to the northeast, follows the course of the Saguenay River via the Petite Décharge on 172.3 km (107.1 mi) eastwards to Tadoussac where it merges with the Estuary of Saint Lawrence.

== Toponymy ==
The toponym "rivière à la Chasse" was formalized on December 5, 1968, at the Place Names Bank of the Commission de toponymie du Québec.

== See also ==
- Le Domaine-du-Roy Regional County Municipality, a regional county municipality
- Sainte-Hedwidge, a municipality
- Saint-Prime, a municipality
- Lac Saint-Jean, a body of water
- Saguenay River, a stream
