= Petite rivière à l'Ours - West =

Petite rivière à l'Ours

Location
- Country: Canada
- Province: Quebec
- Region: Saguenay-Lac-Saint-Jean
- MRC: Le Domaine-du-Roy Regional County Municipality
- Municipality: Saint-Félicien

Physical characteristics
- Source: Small unidentified lake
  - location: Saint-Félicien
  - coordinates: 48°38′26″N 72°35′14″W
  - elevation: 239 m (784 ft)
- Mouth: Ashuapmushuan River
  - location: Saint-Félicien
  - coordinates: 48°37′23″N 72°27′26″W
  - elevation: 108 m (354 ft)
- Length: 13.1 km (8.1 mi)

Basin features
- Progression: Rivière à l'Ours, Ashuapmushuan River, Lac Saint-Jean, Saguenay River
- Tributaries
  - left: (upstream) Four stream discharges.
  - right: (upstream) Discharge from three streams, discharge from a stream draining several small lakes.

The Petite rivière à l'Ours - West (English: "Little Bear River" - West) is a tributary of rivière à l'Ours, flowing in the municipality of Saint-Félicien, in the Le Domaine-du-Roy Regional County Municipality, in the administrative region of Saguenay–Lac-Saint-Jean, in the province of Quebec, in Canada.

The upper part of the Petite Rivière à l'Ours valley is served by forest roads. The lower part is served by chemin du rang Simple, chemin du rang Double and rue Notre-Dame.

Forestry is the main economic activity in the upper part of this valley; agriculture, for the lower part.

The surface of the Little Bear River is usually frozen from the beginning of December to the end of March, except the rapids areas; however, safe traffic on the ice is generally from mid-December to mid-March.

== Geography ==
The Little Bear River takes its source from an unidentified small lake (length: 0.3 km (0.19 mi); altitude: 239 m (784 ft)), in the western part of the municipality from Saint-Félicien. This lake is fed by an area of marsh that surrounds it. The mouth of this small lake is located at:

- 1.1 km (0.68 mi) east of the course of the rivière à la Carpe;
- 10.5 km (6.5 mi) south-west of downtown Saint-Félicien;
- 10.9 km (6.8 mi) west of the mouth of the Little Bear River - West.

From the mouth of the head lake, the Little Bear River flows over 13.1 km (8.1 mi) with a drop of 131 m (430 ft) especially in forest areas, depending on the segments following:

- 2.6 km (1.6 mi) towards the south-east crossing two small lakes, then towards the north-east, until the outlet of a stream (coming from the north-west);
- 5.8 km (3.6 mi) north-east, up to Chemin du rang Simple;
- 1.9 km (1.2 mi) to the east by crossing the Notre-Dame road, to the outlet (coming from the southwest) from lakes Cossette and Petit;
- 2.8 km (1.7 mi) towards the east by collecting a stream (coming from the northwest) and another (coming from the southwest), to its mouth.

The Little Bear River flows into a bend on the west bank of the rivière à l'Ours. This confluence is located at:

- 2.8 km (1.7 mi) south of downtown Saint-Félicien;
- 8.1 km (5.0 mi) west of the mouth of the Ashuapmushuan River;
- 20.1 km (12.5 mi) northwest of downtown Roberval.

From the mouth of the Little Bear River, the current successively descends the course of the rivière à l'Ours] over 3.7 km (2.3 mi) east, then northeast; the Ashuapmushuan River towards the south-east on 7.3 km (4.5 mi); then crosses lake Saint-Jean east on 41.1 km (25.5 mi) (ie its full length), follows the course of the Saguenay River via the Petite Décharge on 172.3 km (107.1 mi) east to Tadoussac where it merges with the Saint Lawrence Estuary.

== Toponymy ==
The rivière à l'Ours has two tributaries with the same toponymic designation: Little Bear River. The watercourse covered by this article constitutes the western branch.

The toponym "Little Bear River" was formalized on December 5, 1968, at the Place Names Bank of the Commission de toponymie du Québec.
