= Rivière à la Chasse =

Rivière à la Chasse may refer to:

- Rivière à la Chasse (Baie-Comeau), a tributary of the Gulf of St. Lawrence in the town of Baie-Comeau, Quebec, Canada
- Rivière à la Chasse (lac Saint-Jean), a tributary of lac Saint-Jean in the Le Domaine-du-Roy Regional County Municipality, Quebec, Canada
