= Petite rivière à l'Ours - South =

Petite rivière à l'Ours (rivière à l'Ours) - South

Location
- Country: Canada
- Province: Quebec
- Region: Saguenay-Lac-Saint-Jean
- MRC: Le Domaine-du-Roy Regional County Municipality
- TNO or Municipality: Lac-Ashuapmushuan, Sainte-Hedwidge

Physical characteristics
- Source: Lac des Trois Îles
  - location: Lac-Ashuapmushuan
  - coordinates: 48°22′57″N 72°37′00″W
  - elevation: 450 m (1,480 ft)
- Mouth: Rivière à l'Ours
  - location: Sainte-Hedwidge
  - coordinates: 48°35′03″N 72°28′56″W
  - elevation: 350 m (1,150 ft)
- Length: 11.2 km (7.0 mi)

Basin features
- Progression: Rivière à l'Ours, Ashuapmushuan River, Lac Saint-Jean, Saguenay River
- Tributaries
  - left: (upstream) Discharge of several small lakes including Lac de la Chanterelle, discharge of two small lakes.
  - right: (upstream) Discharge from a small lake, discharge from lakes Maurice and l'Orignal, discharge from Lake Linotte, discharge from a small lake, discharge from Lake Émile.

The Petite rivière à l'Ours - South (English: Little river of the Bear) is a tributary of rivière à l'Ours, flowing successively in the unorganized territory of Lac-Ashuapmushuan and in the municipality of Sainte-Hedwidge, in the Le Domaine-du-Roy Regional County Municipality, in the administrative region of Saguenay–Lac-Saint-Jean, in the province of Quebec, in Canada.

The Little Bear River valley is served by forest roads.

Forestry is the main economic activity in this valley, as well as recreational tourism activities in the Zec de la Lièvre area.

The surface of the Little Bear River is usually frozen from the beginning of December to the end of March, except the rapids areas; however, safe traffic on the ice is generally from mid-December to mid-March.

== Geography ==
The Little Bear River takes its source from the Three Islands Lake (length: 1.8 km (1.1 mi); altitude: 450 m (1,480 ft)), in Zec de la Lièvre in the unorganized territory of Lac-Ashuapmushuan. This lake is fed by the outlet (coming from the north) of two lakes including Lac Paul. The mouth of this small lake is located at:

- 32.3 km (20.1 mi) south of downtown Saint-Félicien;
- 14.2 km (8.8 mi) southwest of downtown Sainte-Hedwidge;
- 33.5 km (20.8 mi) south-west of the mouth of the Ashuapmushuan River;
- 6.8 km (4.2 mi) south of the mouth of the Little Bear River - South.

From the mouth of the Three Islands lake, the Little Bear River flows over 11.2 km (7.0 mi) with a drop of 100 m (330 ft) especially in forest areas, according to following segments:

- 3.4 km (2.1 mi) towards the east, forming a loop towards the south, then a hook towards the north, to continue towards the east by collecting a stream (coming from the north), until a river bend corresponding to the outlet (coming from the south) of Lac Émile;
- 4.0 km (2.5 mi) north-west first by crossing an area of marshland, crossing the full length of Lake Nemrods (length: 1.2 km (0.75 mi); altitude: 394 m (1,293 ft)) and collecting the outlet (coming from the east) from Lac de la Linotte, up to the outlet (coming from the east) from lakes Maurice and l'Orignal;
- 3.8 km (2.4 mi) to the north by collecting a stream (coming from the west), then forming some streamers, to its mouth.

The Little Bear River flows into a bend on the southeast bank of the rivière à l'Ours. This confluence is located at:

- 25.5 km (15.8 mi) south of downtown Saint-Félicien;
- 11.4 km (7.1 mi) west of downtown Sainte-Hedwidge;
- 27 km (17 mi) south-west of the mouth of the Ashuapmushuan River;
- 27.6 km (17.1 mi) southwest of downtown Roberval.

From the mouth of the Little Bear River, the current successively descends the course of the rivière à l'Ours over 52.1 km (32.4 mi) north, then northeast; the Ashuapmushuan River towards the south-east on 7.3 km (4.5 mi); then crosses lake Saint-Jean east on 41.1 km (25.5 mi) (ie its full length), follows the course of the Saguenay River via the Petite Décharge on 172.3 km (107.1 mi) east to Tadoussac where it merges with the Saint Lawrence Estuary.

== Toponymy ==
The rivière à l'Ours has two tributaries with the same toponymic designation: Little Bear River. The watercourse covered by this article constitutes the southern branch.

The toponym "Little Bear River" was formalized on February 25, 1976, at the Place Names Bank of the Commission de toponymie du Québec.
