= Pekuakamiulnuatsh First Nation =

First nation in Quebec

Coordinates: 48°34′0″N 72°14′0″W

- Band No. 76
- People: Innu
- Headquarters: Mashteuiatsh
- Province: Quebec

Land
- Main reserve: Mashteuiatsh
- Land area: 15.22 km^{2} (5.88 sq mi)

Population
- On reserve: 2079
- On other land: 23
- Off reserve: 4809
- Total population: 6911

Government
- Chief: Clifford Moar
- Council: Stacey Bossum; Patrick Courtois; Jonathan Germain; Stéphanie Germain; Elizabeth Launière; Charles-Édouard Verreault

Tribal Council
- Mamuitun Tribal Council

Website
- SurlesTracesIlnu.ca

Pekuakamiulnuatsh First Nation or Première Nation des Pekuakamiulnuatsh in French, is a First Nation of Canada. The Nation is based on its reserve of Mashteuiatsh, in the Saguenay–Lac-Saint-Jean region of Quebec. The community is 8 km (5.0 mi) north of Roberval, on the western shore of Lac Saint-Jean.
