= Rivière du Castor =

Location
- Country: Canada
- Province: Quebec
- Region: Saguenay-Lac-Saint-Jean
- MRC: Le Domaine-du-Roy
- Municipality: Sainte-Hedwidge et Saint-Prime

Physical characteristics
- Source: Confluence of two forest streams
  - location: Sainte-Hedwidge
  - coordinates: 48°32′19″N 72°26′45″W
  - elevation: 416 m (1,365 ft)
- Mouth: Rivière à l'Ours
  - location: Saint-Prime
  - coordinates: 48°37′23″N 72°25′43″W
  - elevation: 101 m (331 ft)
- Length: 13.0 km (8.1 mi)

Basin features
- Progression: Ashuapmushuan River, Lac Saint-Jean, Saguenay River
- River system: Rivière à l'Ours, Ashuapmushuan River, Lac Saint-Jean, Saguenay River
- Tributaries
  - left: (upstream) Cayouette stream, Lachance stream, three unidentified streams.
  - right: (upstream) Allard-Dorval stream.

The rivière du Castor (French pronunciation: [ʁivjɛʁ dy kastɔʁ], River of the Beaver) is a tributary of Rivière à l'Ours, flowing successively in the municipalities of Sainte-Hedwidge and Saint-Prime, in the Le Domaine-du-Roy Regional County Municipality, in the administrative region of Saguenay–Lac-Saint-Jean, in the province of Quebec, in Canada.

The Beaver River valley is served by the 3rd range road, the Marcel-Auclair road and the 6th range road.

Forestry and agriculture are the main economic activities in this valley.

The surface of the Beaver River is usually frozen from the beginning of December to the end of March, except the rapids areas; however, safe traffic on the ice is generally from mid-December to mid-March.

== Geography ==
The Beaver River originates at the confluence of two forest streams (altitude: 260 m (850 ft)), in Sainte-Hedwidge. This source is located at:

- 1.6 km (0.99 mi) west of a curve of the Rivière aux Iroquois;
- 12.3 km (7.6 mi) south-east of downtown Saint-Félicien;
- 8.9 km (5.5 mi) north-west of downtown Sainte-Hedwidge;
- 9.5 km (5.9 mi) south-east of the mouth of the Beaver river.

From its source, the Beaver river flows over 13 km (8.1 mi) with a drop of 150 m (490 ft) especially in forest areas, according to the following segments:

- 4.6 km (2.9 mi) towards the north by entering Saint-Prime, forming a hook towards the east, up to the chemin du 6e rang;
- 3.9 km (2.4 mi) towards the north, forming a big S, first in the forest zone, then agricultural, until the Marcel-Auclair road;
- 4.5 km (2.8 mi) towards the north in the agricultural zone, bending towards the northwest, forming a 0.4 km (0.25 mi) loop on the northeast side of the 3rd range road, then more or less along this last road by the southwest side, by crossing the Talbot road, to its mouth.

The Beaver river flows into a bend on the south bank of the Rivière à l'Ours, on the southwest side of the 3rd range road. This confluence is located at:

- 3.2 km (2.0 mi) south-east of downtown Saint-Félicien;
- 7.6 km (4.7 mi) west of downtown Sainte-Hedwidge;
- 3.8 km (2.4 mi) south-west of the mouth of the Beaver river.

From the mouth of the Beaver river, the current successively descends the course of the Rivière à l'Ours on 2.3 km (1.4 mi) toward the North-east; the Ashuapmushuan River towards the south-east on 7.3 km (4.5 mi); then crosses lake Saint-Jean east on 41.1 km (25.5 mi) (ie its full length), follows the course of the Saguenay River via the Petite Décharge on 172.3 km (107.1 mi) east to Tadoussac where it merges with the Saint Lawrence Estuary.
