= Iroquois River =

Iroquois River or Rivière des Iroquois (in French) may refer to:

- Iroquois River (Indiana-Illinois), a tributary of the Kankakee River in Indiana and Illinois in the United States
- Rivière aux Iroquois, a tributary of lac Saint-Jean in the municipality of Sainte-Hedwidge and Saint-Prime, Saguenay–Lac-Saint-Jean, Quebec, Canada
  - Deuxième bras des Iroquois, a tributary of the Rivière aux Iroquois
- Iroquois River (Saint John River tributary), New Brunswick, Canada
  - Little Iroquois River, New Brunswick, Canada
- Iroquois River (Nottaway River tributary), Nord-du-Québec, Quebec, Canada
- Rivière des Iroquois (Richelieu River tributary), Saint-Jean-sur-Richelieu, Le Haut-Richelieu Regional County Municipality, Montérégie, Quebec, Canada
