= Ovide River =

Ovide River Old name: "Petite rivière à l'Ours"

Location
- Country: Canada
- Province: Quebec
- Region: Saguenay-Lac-Saint-Jean
- MRC: Le Domaine-du-Roy
- TNO or Municipality: Lac-Ashuapmushuan, Sainte-Hedwidge et Saint-Prime

Physical characteristics
- Source: Lake surrounded by marsh
  - location: Lac-Ashuapmushuan
  - coordinates: 48°32′55″N 72°32′10″W
  - elevation: 305 m (1,001 ft)
- Mouth: Rivière à l'Ours
  - location: Saint-Prime
  - coordinates: 48°35′03″N 72°28′56″W
  - elevation: 180 m (590 ft)
- Length: 12.7 km (7.9 mi)

Basin features
- Progression: Rivière à l'Ours, Ashuapmushuan River, Lac Saint-Jean, Saguenay River
- Tributaries
  - left: (upstream) Discharge (coming from the north) from a lake, Ditche stream.
  - right: (upstream) Stream (coming from the south), stream (coming from the south).

The Ovide River is a tributary of rivière à l'Ours, flowing successively in the unorganized territory of Lac-Ashuapmushuan, in the municipalities of Sainte-Hedwidge and Saint-Prime, in the Le Domaine-du-Roy Regional County Municipality, in the administrative region of Saguenay–Lac-Saint-Jean, in the province of Quebec, in Canada.

The Ovide river valley is served by forest roads.

Forestry is the main economic activity in this valley, as well as recreational tourism activities in the Zec de la Lièvre area.

The surface of the Ovide River is usually frozen from the beginning of December to the end of March, except the rapids areas; however, safe traffic on the ice is generally from mid-December to mid-March.

== Geography ==
The Ovide river draws its source from a wild lake (length: 0.22 km (0.14 mi); altitude: 303 m (994 ft)) unidentified, surrounded by marshes, in the Zec de la Lièvre in the unorganized territory of Lac-Ashuapmushuan. The mouth of this small lake is located at:

- 13.0 km (8.1 mi) south of downtown Saint-Félicien;
- 15.6 km (9.7 mi) south-west of downtown Saint-Prime;
- 16.9 km (10.5 mi) south-west of the mouth of the Ashuapmushuan River;
- 5.6 km (3.5 mi) south-west of the mouth of the Ovide river.

From the mouth of the head lake, the Bear River flows over 12.7 km (7.9 mi) with a drop of 125 m (410 ft) especially in forest areas, according to the following segments :

- 1.1 km (0.68 mi) south-west, curving south, to the outlet (coming from the west) of a small lake surrounded by marshes;
- 6.2 km (3.9 mi) to the east first in the marsh area, then forming a loop to the south, and enters Saint-Prime where it collects a stream (coming from the south ), then enters Sainte-Hedwidge, to a bend in the river. Note: The route in Saint-Hedwidge is only about 0.244 km (0.152 mi);
- 2.6 km (1.6 mi) to the north by returning to Saint-Prime, by bending to the northeast by collecting a stream (coming from the southeast), until the outlet of the Ditche stream (coming from the west);
- 5.8 km (3.6 mi) first towards the north, then towards the northwest by forming a small loop towards the south, until its mouth.

The Ovide River flows into a bend on the southeast bank of the rivière à l'Ours, just downstream from a series of rapids. This confluence is located at:

- 7.7 km (4.8 mi) northeast of downtown Saint-Félicien;
- 10.8 km (6.7 mi) south-west of downtown Saint-Prime;
- 11.6 km (7.2 mi) south-west of the mouth of the Ashuapmushuan River;
- 62.1 km (38.6 mi) southwest of downtown Alma.

From the mouth of the Ovide river, the current successively descends the course of the rivière à l'Ours on 16 km (9.9 mi) towards the north, then the northeast; the Ashuapmushuan River towards the south-east on 7.3 km (4.5 mi); then crosses lake Saint-Jean east on 41.1 km (25.5 mi) (ie its full length), follows the course of the Saguenay River via the Petite Décharge on 172.3 km (107.1 mi) east to Tadoussac where it merges with the Saint Lawrence Estuary.

== Toponymy ==
The term "Ovide" turns out to be a first name.

The toponym "Ovide River" was formalized on May 11, 1976, at the Place Names Bank of the Commission de toponymie du Québec.

== Appendices ==
=== Related articles ===
- Le Domaine-du-Roy Regional County Municipality
- Lac-Ashuapmushuan, an unorganized territory
- Sainte-Hedwidge, a municipality
- Saint-Prime, a municipality
- Rivière à l'Ours
- Ashuapmushuan River
- Lac Saint-Jean, a body of water
- Saguenay River, a stream
