= Rivière à l'Ours (Ashuapmushuan River tributary) =

Location
- Country: Canada
- Province: Quebec
- Region: Saguenay-Lac-Saint-Jean
- MRC: Le Domaine-du-Roy
- TNO or Municipality: Lac-Ashuapmushuan, Sainte-Hedwidge et Saint-Prime

Physical characteristics
- Source: Lac à l'Ours
  - location: Lac-Ashuapmushuan
  - coordinates: 48°26′40″N 72°37′09″W
  - elevation: 416 m (1,365 ft)
- Mouth: Ashuapmushuan River
  - location: Saint-Prime
  - coordinates: 48°38′48″N 72°23′26″W
  - elevation: 101 m (331 ft)
- Length: 55 km (34 mi)

Basin features
- Progression: Ashuapmushuan River, Lac Saint-Jean, Saguenay River
- Tributaries
  - left: (upstream) Petite rivière à l'Ours, unidentified stream, outlet of Lac des Étudiants, unidentified stream, outlet of a set of lakes including Lac Vert, unidentified stream, outlet of a set of lakes including Miroir Lake, outlet from Squatter Lake.
  - right: (upstream) Rivière du Castor, Ovide River, 3 unidentified streams, outlet of Vinceset lake, outlet of Lac du Braconnier, unidentified stream, Petite rivière à l'Ours

The Rivière à l'Ours is a tributary of Ashuapmushuan River, flowing successively in the unorganized territory of Lac-Ashuapmushuan, in the municipalities of Saint-Félicien and Saint-Prime, in the Le Domaine-du-Roy Regional County Municipality, in the administrative region of Saguenay–Lac-Saint-Jean, in the province of Quebec, in Canada.

The upper part of the Bear River valley is served by forest roads.

Forestry is the main economic activity in the upper part of this valley, as well as recreational tourism activities in the Zec de la Lièvre area; agriculture, in the lower part.

The surface of the Bear River is usually frozen from the beginning of December to the end of March, except the rapids areas; however, safe traffic on the ice is generally from mid-December to mid-March.

== Geography ==
The Bear River has its source in Bear Lake (length: 2.4 km (1.5 mi); altitude: 416 m (1,365 ft)) in Zec de la Lièvre in the unorganized territory of Lac-Ashuapmushuan. This head lake hosted between the mountains, is mainly fed by the discharge (coming from the southwest) of a small unidentified lake, the discharge (coming from the west) of a set of lakes including Lac de Nuit, the outlet (coming from the north) of a set of lakes including Lac du Hibou and Lac Georges. The mouth of Lac à l'Ours is located at:

- 26.1 km (16.2 mi) south of downtown Saint-Félicien;
- 26.7 km (16.6 mi) south-west of downtown Saint-Prime;
- 28.6 km (17.8 mi) south-west of the mouth of the Ashuapmushuan River;
- 28.1 km (17.5 mi) southwest of the mouth of the "rivière à l'Ours".

From the mouth of Lac à l'Ours, the Rivière à l'Ours flows over 55 km (34 mi) with a drop of 315 m (1,033 ft), especially in forest areas (part upper), then agricultural in the lower part, according to the following segments:

- 2.9 km (1.8 mi) eastwards crossing Little Bear Lake and another small unidentified lake, collecting the outlet of Squatter Lake (coming from the north), up to a bend of river corresponding to the outlet of the Petite rivière à l'Ours (coming from the south);
- 28.7 km (17.8 mi) towards the north, bending towards the northeast to collect a stream (coming from the south) and forming a loop towards the south until a bend of the river corresponding to the outlet of the Lake Poacher; then flowing north by collecting the discharge (coming from the west) of a set of lakes including Lac Miroir, crossing areas of marsh where the river meanders, forming a loop west to collect a stream (coming from the west), then passing through Saint-Prime on 0.5 km (0.31 mi) and then passing through Saint-Félicien on 1.1 km (0.68 mi), forming a hook towards the west end of segment, up to a bend in the river corresponding to a stream (coming from the west);
- 7.4 km (4.6 mi) towards the east by collecting a stream (coming from the south), then curving towards the north, until the confluence of the Ovide River (coming from the south-east). Note: From the start of this segment, the course of the "rivière à l'Ours" forms the boundary between Saint-Félicien (north bank of the river) and Saint-Prime (south bank);
- 12.3 km (7.6 mi) to the north first by winding and crossing four zones of rapids, then forking to the northeast while winding, then north at the end of the segment, until the Petite rivière à l'Ours (coming from the west);
- 1.4 km (0.87 mi) towards the northeast by forming a loop towards the south at the end of the segment, until the outlet of the rivière du Castor (coming from the south-east);
- 2.3 km (1.4 mi) towards the north-east first by crossing the 3rd range road, by winding, then by bending towards the north at the end of the segment where the river crosses rue Principale (route 169) from Saint-Prime, and the railway, to its mouth.

The Bear River flows on the southwest bank of the Ashuapmushuan River, just downstream from a peninsula attached to the south bank and stretching to the north. From this confluence, the current goes around three islands. This confluence is located at:

- 4.0 km (2.5 mi) northeast of downtown Saint-Félicien;
- 7.4 km (4.6 mi) north-west of downtown Saint-Prime;
- 5.8 km (3.6 mi) north-west of the mouth of the Ashuapmushuan River;
- 56.3 km (35.0 mi) west of downtown Alma.

From the mouth of the Bear River, the current descends the course of the Ashuapmushuan River towards the southeast on 7.3 km (4.5 mi), then crosses Lake Saint-Jean east on 41.1 km (25.5 mi) (i.e. its full length), take the course of the Saguenay River via the Petite Décharge on 172.3 km (107.1 mi) east to Tadoussac where it merges with the Estuary of Saint Lawrence.

== Toponymy ==
The toponym "rivière à l'Ours" was formalized on December 5, 1968, at the Place Names Bank of the Commission de toponymie du Québec.
