= Malvina Gagné =

Ursuline nun

Malvina Gagné, known as Sister Saint-Raphaël, (November 6, 1837 – December 29, 1920) was an educator and Ursuline nun. She was founder and superior for the monastery at Roberval, Quebec.

== Biography ==
The daughter of Joseph Gagné, master pilot, and Luce Mercier, she was born in Saint-Michel and was educated there. Her father died when she was two and her mother became a seamstress to support the family. Four years later, Gagné's mother married a sailor Prudent Lacombe. At the age of 15, Gagné began teaching on the Île d’Orléans. The following year, she returned home to continue her studies. She began teaching at Isle-Verte when she was 17. In 1860, she entered the Ursuline monastery in Quebec City. In 1863, she took her vows as a nun. She studied at the normal school run by the Ursulines, excelling in mathematics. In 1878, she was made mistress of the noviciate at Chatham, Ontario. She returned to Quebec City in 1880 and was sent to the Lac Saint-Jean region in spring 1882; her mission was to found a monastery at Roberval to encourage religious vocations and educate young girls. Gagné adjusted the curriculum to meet local needs, educating young women in farming and domestic science. Graduates from this program could also take examinations to qualify for a teaching certificate.

Gagné worked closely with the Quebec Department of Agriculture and Colonization to maintain her curriculum and she also served as an advisor to local farmers. She continued to serve as superior for the monastery until she was nearly 70. Later, she still worked in the bursary (treasury), taught a few classes and continued to serve as an advisor.

She died in Roberval at the age of 83. At the time, the Le Progrès du Saguenay reported that Gagné's life "was part of the history of the region". The curriculum that she developed served as a model used elsewhere in Quebec and abroad where women worked in pioneering environments.
