= Solange Harvey =

Canadian journalist (1930-2008)

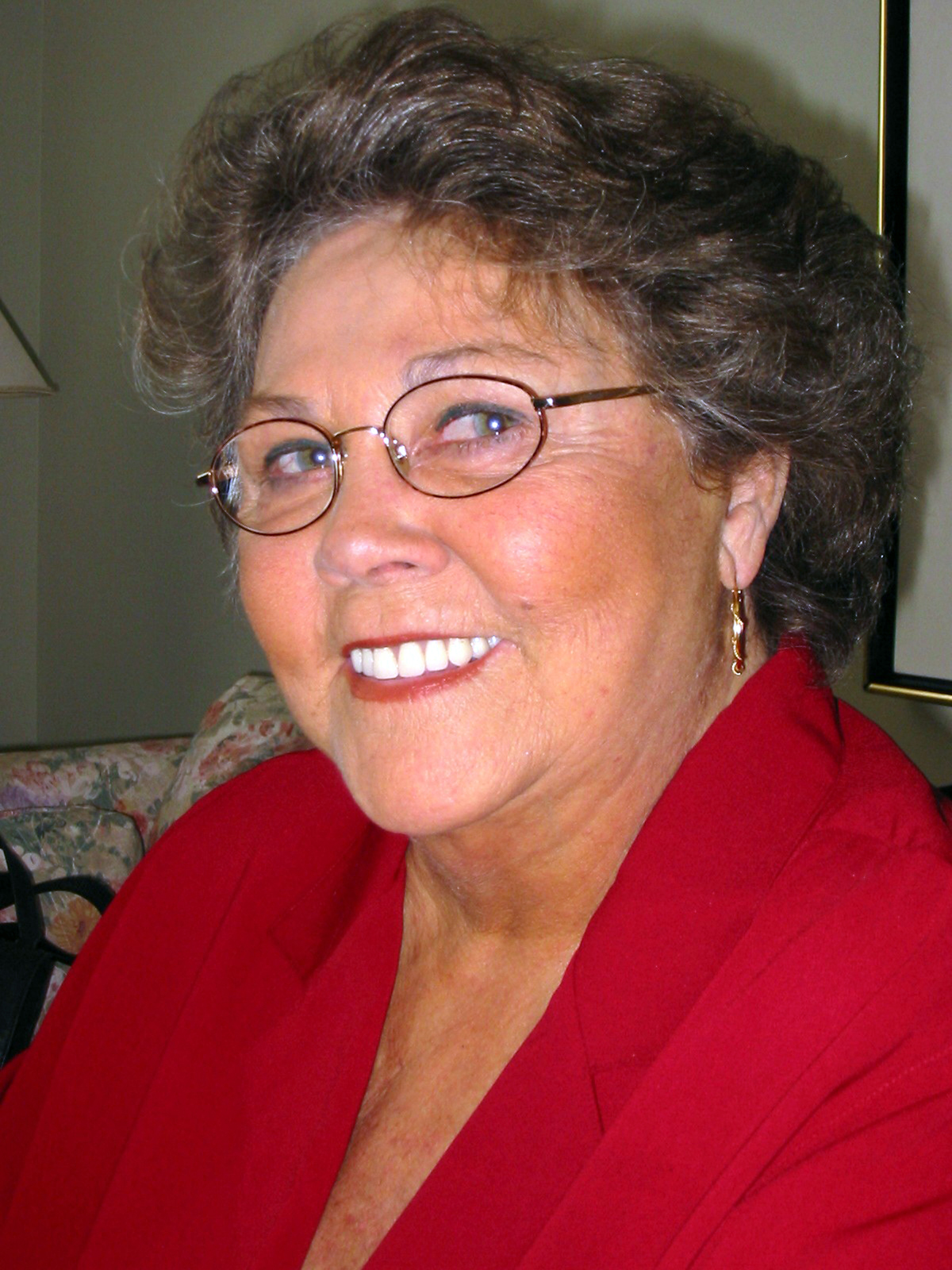
- Born: December 9, 1930; Roberval, Quebec
- Died: July 2, 2008 (aged 77); Longueuil, Québec
- Occupations: Journalist, columnist and writer
- Known for: Solange's Mail
- Children: 5

Solange Harvey (December 9, 1930 – July 2, 2008) was a Canadian journalist, columnist and writer. She became widely known as an advice columnist for the Journal de Montréal and the Journal de Québec, and as a radio broadcaster, public speaker and online personality.

== Biography ==
Marie Rose Annette Solanges was born December 9, 1930, in Roberval, Quebec as the fourth child of Amédée Harvey from Saint-Jean-sur-Richelieu and Ida Simard from Saguenay. She was married to Roland Gauthier on July 31, 1948. They had five children.

She worked as a journalist and columnist at Le Journal de Montréal from October 11, 1975 through October 11, 2000. Her daily column called "The Mail of Happiness" was later renamed "Solange's Mail." According to Le Devoir, for those 25 years, Solange's Mail was "one of the best-known and most widely read columns in the province's newspapers." She also became known to audiences via radio, television (as host of Radio-Québec) and online media. She was called a "pioneer of advice columns" by TVAnouvelles.

Her philanthropic work with drug addicts and alcoholics was cited in her obituaries.

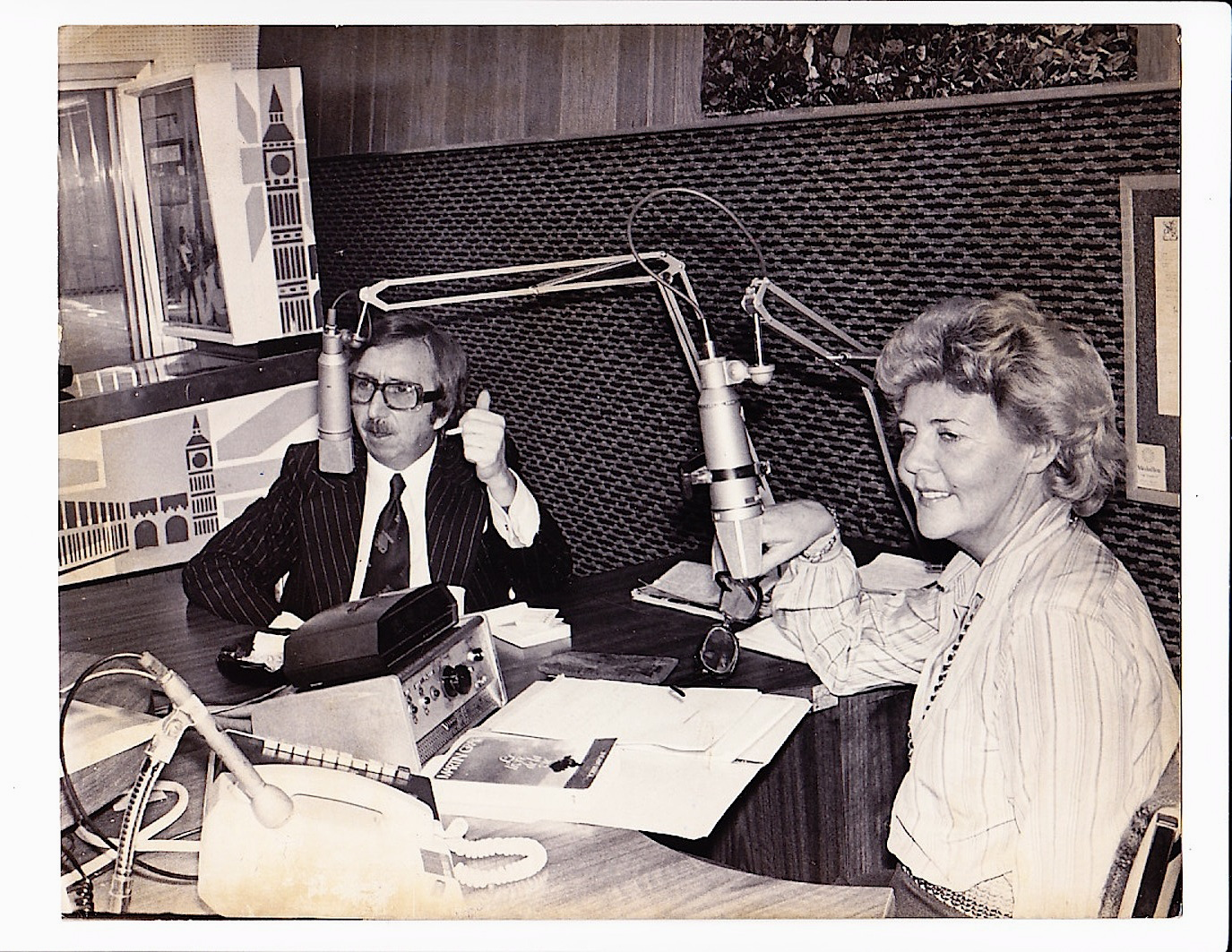
"Confidences" radio show with Solange Harvey (right) and Pierre Péladeau, on CKVL-AM, Montreal, Quebec, Canada (1978)

In her biography, Quand il ne reste que l’amour... (When Only Love Remains...), written by Jean-Pierre Bélanger and published by Éditions Ihiblistar, Harvey "recounts how she was raised in an environment of fear and guilt, eventually breaking free through sheer courage and tenacity."

Before her death, she had been hospitalized for respiratory problems several times. She died at 77 on July 2, 2008, at Pierre-Boucher Hospital in Longueuil from episodic cardiac arrhythmia. Her three sons and two daughters survived her.
