= Mashteuiatsh =

- Indian reserve
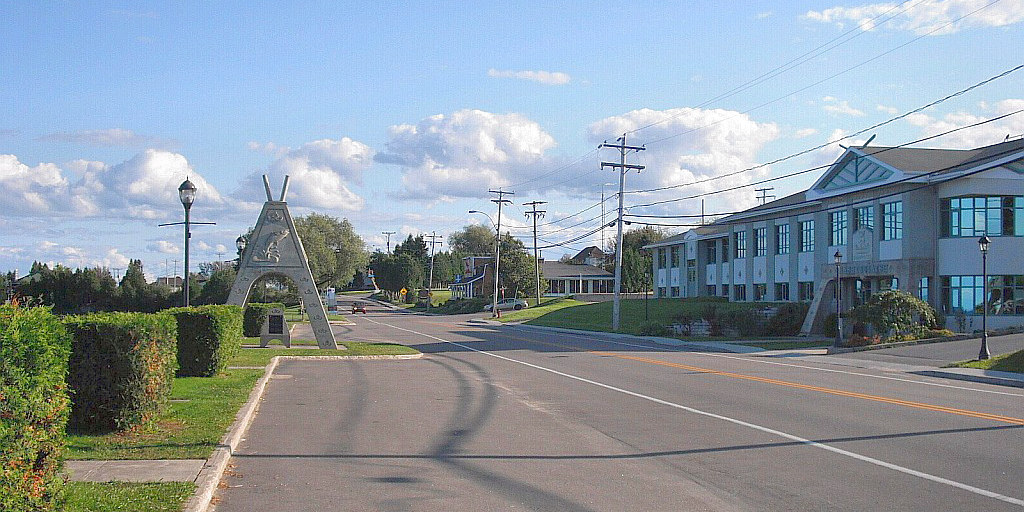
- Ouiatchouan Street

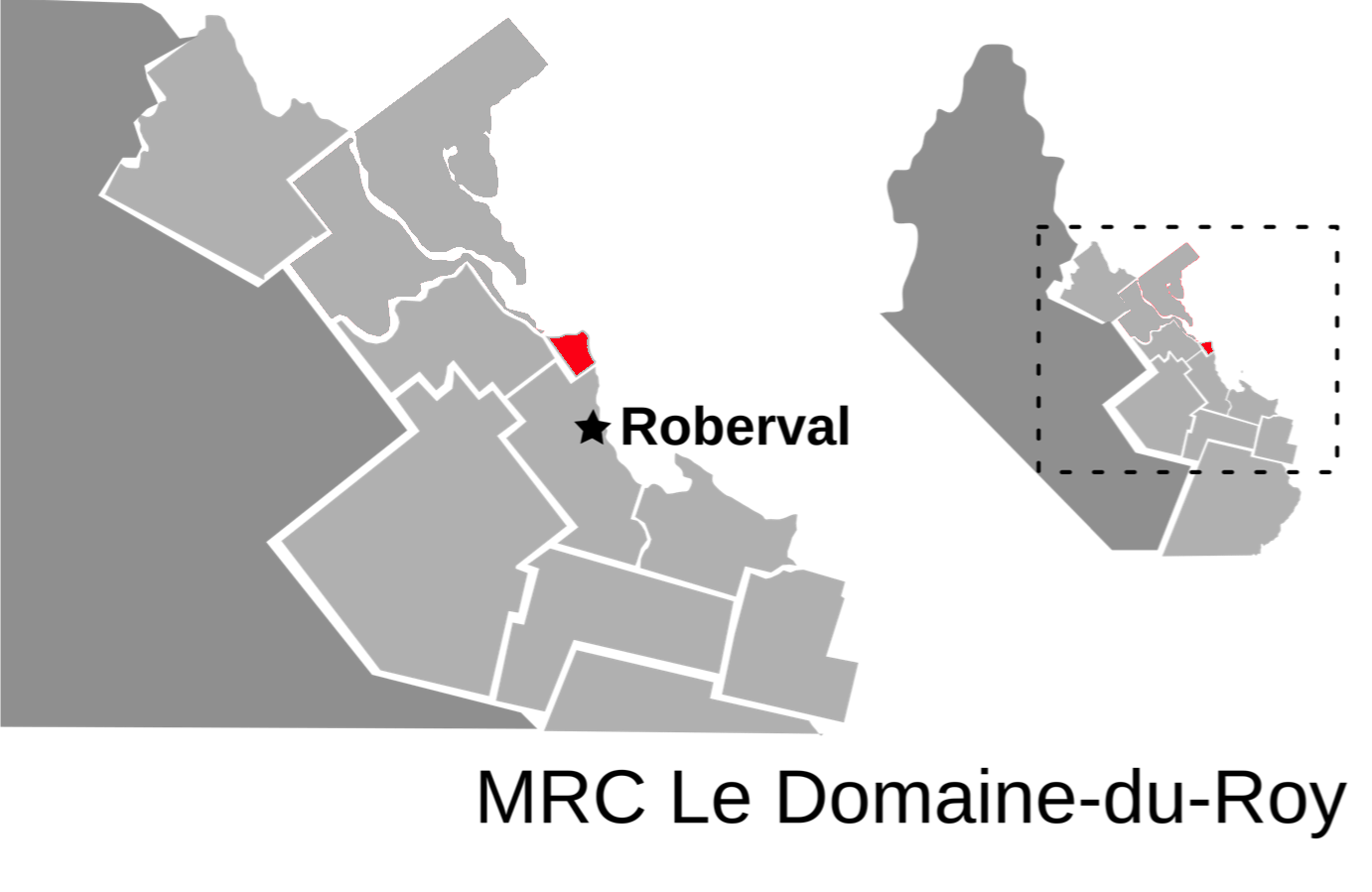

- Location within Lac-Saint-Jean, Quebec
- Coordinates: 48°34′N 72°14′W
- Country: Canada
- Province: Quebec
- Region: Saguenay–Lac-Saint-Jean
- RCM: None
- Formed: September 6, 1856

Government
  - Chief: Jonathan Germain
  - Federal riding: Lac-Saint-Jean
  - Prov. riding: Roberval

Area
  - Total: 15.20 km^{2} (5.87 sq mi)
  - Land: 14.43 km^{2} (5.57 sq mi)

Population (2021)
  - Total: 2,010
  - Density: 139.3/km^{2} (361/sq mi)
  - Change (2016–21): ▲2.7%
  - Dwellings: 1,095
- Time zone: UTC−5 (EST)
  - Summer (DST): UTC−4 (EDT)
- Postal Code: G0W 2H0
- Area codes: 418 and 581
- Website: www.mashteuiatsh.ca

Mashteuiatsh is a First Nations reserve in the Saguenay–Lac-Saint-Jean region of Quebec, Canada, about 6 kilometres (3.7 mi) north from the centre of Roberval. It is the home to the Pekuakamiulnuatsh First Nation. It is located on a headland jutting out on the western shores of Lake Saint-Jean known as Pointe-Bleue (French pronunciation: [pwɛ̃t blø], lit. 'Blue Point'), in the geographic township of Ouiatchouan, and belongs to the Montagnais du Lac St-Jean Innu band. It is geographically within the Le Domaine-du-Roy Regional County Municipality but administratively not part of it.

Previously officially known as Ouiatchouan Reserve, it was renamed Mashteuiatsh in 1985, from Ka Mesta8iats, meaning "where there is a point" or "seeing one yet again at the point".

Mashteuiatsh is serviced by a health centre, community radio station, arena, library, community and sports centre, social services centre, municipal water and sewer system, fire station, and an aboriginal police force. The reserve is home to the Mashteuiatsh Amerindian Museum (Musée amérindien de Mashteuiatsh), which was founded in 1977 with a mission to preserve Innu cultural heritage.

Before becoming a reserve according to the Indian Act in 1856, Mashteuiatsh – which means “Where there is a point” – was already for the Ilnuatsh a sector of passage and frequented gathering. Initially called by the name of Ouiatchouan, the community has been called Mashteuiatsh since 1985. The popular name of Pointe-Bleue has long also designated the inhabited area of the reserve. The majority of the members of the Pekuakamiulnuatsh First Nation live in the Saguenay-Lac-Saint-Jean region, mainly in the community of Mashteuiatsh. It is inhabited by the Montagnais of Lac St-Jean.

== History ==
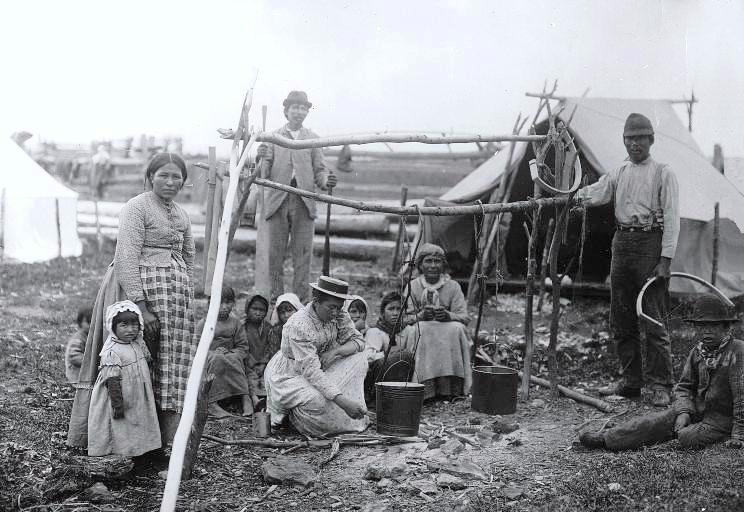
Innu family on Lake Saint-Jean, 1898

Before Europeans arrived in the area, the site was a frequently used stopover place and camp of the indigenous Innu. Circa 1775, a trading post was established there, owned by English merchants Thomas Dunn and John Gray.

In 1853, the Commissioner of Crown Lands, John Rolph, had proposed to assign the Innu living near the Peribonka River, north of Lake Saint-Jean, a reserve of 16,000 acres (6,500 ha) and the Innu residing in Métabetchouan Township, south of Lake Saint-Jean, were allotted 4,000 acres (1,600 ha). But because Pointe-Bleue had been their traditional site and because loggers would not respect the boundaries of the reserved lands, the Innu asked the Government of Canada to exchange these lands bordering the Peribonka and Métabetchouane Rivers for those in Ouiatchouan Township where Pointe-Bleue is. This request was granted in 1856, and the Innu were allotted an area of 23,040 acres (9,320 ha), from then on officially known as Ouiatchouan Reserve.

In 1867, the Hudson's Bay Company established there its trading post. This gave the reserve some importance, attracting an Oblates' mission in 1875, and even resulting in the closure of the Métabetchouan Post in 1880. Nevertheless, the Innu showed no interest in permanent settlement. Furthermore, under insistent pressure by political and religious authorities who promoted the area's colonization by new settlers, the Innu ceded more than 15,000 acres (6,100 ha) back to the government in 1869, and another 2,400 acres (970 ha) in 1895. The reserve was reduced in size again in 1901 when more lots were sold off, in 1911 when the James Bay & Eastern Railway was built through it, and in 1933 when the Duke Price Power Company raised Lake Saint-Jean's water level by more than 15 feet (4.6 m), leaving only the lands bordering the lake.

In 1985 and 1986, the Lac St-Jean Innu began claiming for compensation and recovery of most of these lost lands. On February 28, 2000, a settlement agreement with the Government of Canada was signed.

=== Native American Museum ===
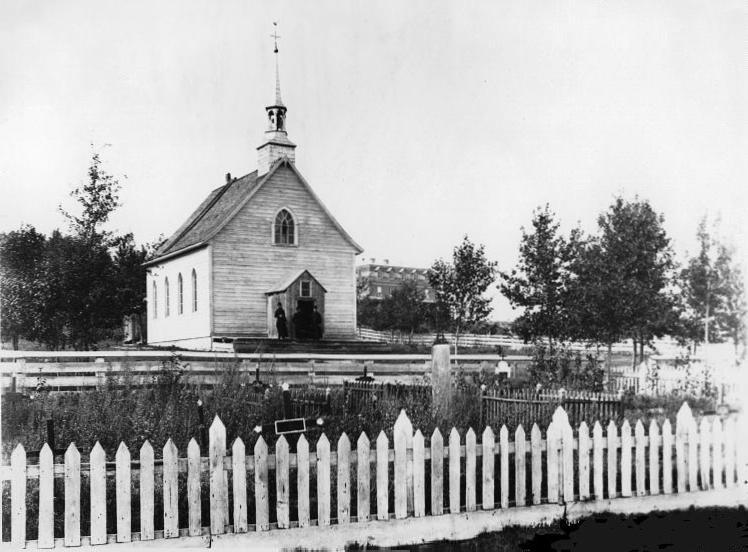
Church, Pointe-Bleue, 1892

The Mashteuiatsh Native Museum was built in 1977, and transmits the history and culture of the pekuakamiulnuatsh (Ilnus du lac-saint-Jean). It is possible to find knowledge on the Ilnuatsh, but also on the other First Nations of Quebec and America. In addition to its permanent exhibition, the Native American Museum offers three temporary exhibitions, as well as a visit to the Nutshimitsh outdoor garden (in the forest), artistic creation workshops and a boutique area. These activities are also available in the form of a guided tour, made by members of the community.

== Geography ==
The Indian Reserve of Mashteuiatsh is located at the junction of Roberval and Saint-Prime, on the shore of the Lac Saint-Jean in Saguenay–Lac-Saint-Jean, Quebec. It is located at 68 kilometres (42 mi) west of Alma and it covers an area of 1,443 hectares (3,570 acres). It is linked to Roberval to the south via boulevard Horace-J.-Beemer.

== Demographics ==
Canada census – Mashteuiatsh community profile

	2021	2016	2011
Population	2,010 (+2.7% from 2016)	1,957 (-11.6% from 2011)	2,213 (26.5% from 2006)
Land area	14.43 km^{2} (5.57 sq mi)	14.51 km^{2} (5.60 sq mi)	14.50 km^{2} (5.60 sq mi)
Population density	139.3/km^{2} (361/sq mi)	134.9/km^{2} (349/sq mi)	152.6/km^{2} (395/sq mi)
Median age	43.6 (M: 42.4, F: 44.8)	37.5 (M: 37.1, F: 38.3)	35.8 (M: 35.8, F: 35.7)
Private dwellings	1,095 (total) 808 (occupied)	1,022 (total)	1,005 (total)
Median household income	$77,500	$49,216	$NA

References: 2021 2016 2011

As of 2022, the band counted 8,373 members, of which 2,104 persons are living in the community.

Population trend:

- Population in 2021: 2,010 (2016 to 2021 population change: 2.7%)
- Population in 2016: 1,957
- Population in 2011: 2,213
- Population in 2006: 1,749
- Population in 2001: 1,861
- Population in 1996: 1,725
- Population in 1991: 1,489
- Population in 1986: 1,340
- Population in 1981: 1,318
- Population in 1976: 1,192
- Population in 1971: 1,196
- Population in 1966: 1,464
- Population in 1961: 1,147
- Population in 1956: 843
- Population in 1951: 776
- Population in 1941: 789
- Population in 1931: 780

Private dwellings occupied by usual residents: 808 (total dwellings: 1,095)

Mother tongue:

- English as first language: 1.3%
- French as first language: 92.0%
- English and French as first language: 0.3%
- Other as first language: 5.5%

== Economy ==
The local economy is based mostly on logging, construction, transport, and tourism. There are some 130 businesses on the reserve that provide services such as: food, hotel accommodations, sawmills, electrician, auto mechanics, taxi, arts and handicrafts, post office, excavation, plumbing, translation, camping, hardware, convenience store, restaurants.

== Education ==
There are two schools on the reserve:

- École Amishk, providing pre-Kindergarten to elementary grade 6, with an enrolment of 247 students in 2008-2009
- École Kassinu-Mamu, providing secondary grade 1 to 5, with an enrolment of 230 students in 2008-2009
