= Rivière aux Iroquois =

Location
- Country: Canada
- Province: Quebec
- Region: Saguenay-Lac-Saint-Jean
- MRC: Le Domaine-du-Roy Regional County Municipality
- TNO or Municipality: Roberval

Physical characteristics
- Source: Lac aux Iroquois
  - location: Sainte-Hedwidge
  - coordinates: 48°22′15″N 72°29′19″W
  - elevation: 371 m (1,217 ft)
- Mouth: Lac Saint-Jean
  - location: Saint-Prime
  - coordinates: 48°36′07″N 72°19′55″W
  - elevation: 101 m (331 ft)
- Length: 48 km (30 mi)

Basin features
- Progression: Lac Saint-Jean, Saguenay River
- Tributaries
  - left: (upstream) Deuxième Bras des Iroquois, Lac du Dix outlet, one stream, Lac aux Outardes outlet, three streams.
  - right: (upstream) Gosselin stream, five streams, outlet of Lac Vert, outlet of a small lake, outlet of Lac à la Loutre, two streams.

The rivière aux Iroquois (French pronunciation: [ʁivjɛʁ oz‿iʁɔkwa]) is a tributary of lac Saint-Jean, flowing the municipality of Sainte-Hedwidge and Saint-Prime, in the Le Domaine-du-Roy Regional County Municipality, in the administrative region of Saguenay–Lac-Saint-Jean, in the province of Quebec, in Canada.

The upper part of the Iroquois river valley is served by the Chemin de la Lièvre, the Chemin du Lac-à-la-Loutre and the Chemin de la Rexfor; the intermediate part, via Chemin du Lac-du-Dix, Chemin du 9e rang and chemin du 8e rang; the lower part via Chemin du 3e rang, Route Marcel-Auclair and Rue Principale. Forestry is the main economic activity in the middle part of this valley; agriculture, in the lower part.

The surface of the Iroquois River is usually frozen from the beginning of December to the end of March, except the rapids areas; however, traffic on the ice is generally safe from mid-December to mid-March.

== Geography ==
The Rivière aux Iroquois takes its source from Lac aux Iroquois (length: 1.6 km (0.99 mi); altitude: 371 m (1,217 ft)) in Sainte-Hedwidge. This deformed lake has two parts separated by a peninsula which face each other: one of 0.6 km (0.37 mi) attached to the north shore and the other of 0.13 km (0.081 mi), attached to the south shore. The mouth of Lac aux Iroquois is located at:

- 6.4 km (4.0 mi) west of the course of the Ouiatchouaniche River;
- 15.4 km (9.6 mi) south-west of the village center of Sainte-Hedwidge;
- 28.2 km (17.5 mi) south-west of the mouth of the Iroquois river.

From the mouth of Lac aux Iroquois, the Iroquois river flows over 48 km (30 mi) with a drop of 270 m (890 ft), according to the following segments:

- 10.5 km (6.5 mi) generally towards the north, forming many very small coils, collecting three streams (coming from the west), three others (coming from the east) and the discharge (coming from the east) from Lac à la Loutre, to the outlet (coming from the southwest) from Lac aux Outardes;
- 5.4 km (3.4 mi) towards the northwest by forming several small streamers, then turning west, until the outlet (coming from the south) of the Lac de la Savane;
- 4.2 km (2.6 mi) towards the north by skirting a mountain on the west side, then curving towards the northeast, until the outlet (coming from the north) of Lac du Dix;
- 8.2 km (5.1 mi) first towards the east, then towards the north by forming numerous small streamers and crossing several series of rapids at the end of the segments, until the confluence of the Second Bras de l'Iroquois;
- 14.6 km (9.1 mi) towards the north first in the forest zone in a deep valley, zigzagging while entering the plain, then entering agricultural by forming numerous streamers, up to a bend in the river;
- 5.1 km (3.2 mi) to the east, winding heavily in an agricultural area, cutting the route 169 (rue Principale de Saint-Prime), collecting the Perron stream (coming from the south) and cutting the railway at the end of the segment, to its mouth.

The Rivière aux Iroquois flows onto the southwest shore of lac Saint-Jean. This confluence is located between the villages of Saint-Prime and Pointe-Bleue, either:

- 7.8 km (4.8 mi) west of the center of the village of Pointe-Bleue;
- 1.0 km (0.62 mi) north of the village center of Saint-Prime;
- 12.6 km (7.8 mi) northwest of downtown Roberval.

From the mouth of the Iroquois River, the current crosses Lake Saint-Jean east on 42.5 km (26.4 mi) northeast, follows the course of the Saguenay River (via the Little Landfill) on 172.3 km (107.1 mi) eastwards to Tadoussac where it merges with the Estuary of Saint Lawrence.

The area of the Iroquois River watershed is 204.6 km^{2} (79.0 sq mi).

== Toponymy ==
The toponym "Rivière aux Iroquois" is linked to that of the head lake and that of the main arm designated "Second arm to the Iroquois".

The toponym "Rivière aux Iroquois" was formalized on December 5, 1968, at the Place Names Bank of the Commission de toponymie du Québec.

== Appendices ==
=== Related articles ===
- Le Domaine-du-Roy Regional County Municipality
- Sainte-Hedwidge, a municipality
- Saint-Prime, a municipality
- Lac Saint-Jean, a body of water
- Deuxième Bras des Iroquois, a stream
- Saguenay River, a stream
- List of rivers of Saguenay basin
