= Petite rivière Eusèbe =

Location
- Country: Canada
- Province: Quebec
- Region: Saguenay-Lac-Saint-Jean
- MRC: Le Domaine-du-Roy
- TNO or Municipality: Saint-Félicien

Physical characteristics
- Source: Little unidentified lake
  - location: Saint-Félicien
  - coordinates: 48°40′54″N 72°34′15″W
  - elevation: 156 m (512 ft)
- Mouth: Ashuapmushuan River
  - location: Saint-Félicien
  - coordinates: 48°39′23″N 72°26′56″W
  - elevation: 101 m (331 ft)
- Length: 8.5 km (5.3 mi)

Basin features
- Progression: Ashuapmushuan River, Lac Saint-Jean, Saguenay River
- Tributaries
  - left: (upstream)
  - right: (upstream) Germain stream, rivière à la Carpe, South Branch.

The Petite rivière Eusèbe (English: Little River Eusèbe) is a tributary of Ashuapmushuan River, flowing the municipality of Saint-Félicien, in the Le Domaine-du-Roy Regional County Municipality, in the administrative region of Saguenay–Lac-Saint-Jean, in the province of Quebec, in Canada.

The upper part of the Petite Rivière Eusèbe valley is served by Boulevard du Jardin (route 167) and Chemin du rang Double; the lower part, by boulevard du Jardin and boulevard Saint-Félicien.

Apart from a small forest area at the start of the route and the urban area at the end of the route, agriculture is the main economic activity in this valley.

The surface of the Petite Rivière Eusèbe is usually frozen from the beginning of December to the end of March, except the rapids areas; however, safe traffic on the ice is generally from mid-December to mid-March.

== Geography ==
The Petite Rivière Eusèbe takes its source at the mouth of a very small unidentified lake (altitude: 156 m (512 ft)) at the edge of the agricultural and forest zone in Saint-Félicien. This small lake is fed by the Thibeault branch. This source is located at:

- 1.6 km (0.99 mi) north-west of boulevard du Jardin route 169;
- 4.9 km (3.0 mi) south-west of the bank of the Ashuapmushuan River;
- 9.4 km (5.8 mi) west of the mouth of the Petite Rivière Eusèbe.

From its source, the Petite Rivière Eusèbe flows over 8.5 km (5.3 mi) with a drop of 55 m (180 ft), especially in the agricultural and village areas at the end of the route, depending on the segments following:

- 1.4 km (0.87 mi) south-east, by crossing the path of Rang Simple, by collecting the Castonguay Branch (coming from the west), up to Boulevard du Jardin;
- 3.9 km (2.4 mi) towards the south-east by crossing the Chemin du Rang Double, collecting the South Branch (coming from the south-west), up to the outlet of the rivière à la Carpe (coming from the South West);
- 3.2 km (2.0 mi) towards the south-east by crossing the boulevard du Jardin (north-south direction), by collecting the Germain stream (coming from the west), by cutting the boulevard Saint-Félicien (east-west direction), crossing Saint-Félicien, to its mouth.

The Petite Rivière Eusèbe flows on the southwest bank of the Ashuapmushuan River. This confluence is located in downtown Saint-Félicien at the foot of the Saint-Félicien Boulevard bridge which spans the Ashuapmushuan river, either:

- 0.34 km (0.21 mi) north-east of the railway section;
- 9.3 km (5.8 mi) west of the mouth of the Ashuapmushuan River;
- 60.6 km (37.7 mi) west of downtown Alma.

From the mouth of the Petite rivière Eusèbe, the current descends the course of the Ashuapmushuan River towards the southeast on 11.4 km (7.1 mi), then crosses Lake Saint-Jean towards East on 41.1 km (25.5 mi) (ie its full length), follows the course of the Saguenay River via the Petite Décharge on 172.3 km (107.1 mi) eastwards to Tadoussac where it merges with the Saint Lawrence Estuary.

== Toponymy ==
The term "Eusèbe" turns out to be a first name of French origin.

The toponym "Petite rivière Eusèbe" was formalized on August 28, 1973, at the Place Names Bank of the Commission de toponymie du Québec.
