= Iroquois, West Virginia =

Community in West Virginia, US

Iroquois
- Unincorporated community
- Location within the state of West Virginia Iroquois (the United States)
- Coordinates: 37°34′52″N 81°20′26″W
- Country: United States
- State: West Virginia
- County: Wyoming
- Elevation: 1,506 ft (459 m)
- Time zone: UTC-5 (Eastern (EST))
  - Summer (DST): UTC-4 (EDT)
- GNIS ID: 1554782

Iroquois is an unincorporated community in Wyoming County, West Virginia, United States.

The community was named after the Haudenosaunee (Iroquois) people.
