= USS Iroquois =

USS Iroquois may refer to the following ships of the United States Navy:

- USS Iroquois (1859), was a steam sloop of war launched 12 April 1859, renamed Ionie 30 November 1904 and struck 26 August 1910
- USS Iroquois (AT-46), was a steam tug purchased by the US Navy 18 April 1898 and sold 15 May 1928

== See also ==
- SS Iroquois
