= Rivière à l'Ours Ouest =

Location
- Country: Canada
- Province: Quebec
- Region: Côte-Nord
- MRC: Manicouagan Regional County Municipality
- City: Baie-Comeau

Physical characteristics
- Source: Unidentified Lake
  - location: Havre-Saint-Pierre
  - coordinates: 50°30′08″N 63°12′15″W
  - elevation: 119 m (390 ft)
- Mouth: Gulf of Saint Lawrence
  - location: Havre-Saint-Pierre
  - coordinates: 50°19′42″N 63°05′48″W
  - elevation: 39.4 m (129 ft)
- Length: 28.4 km (17.6 mi)

Basin features
- Tributaries
  - right: Ruisseau du détour

The Rivière à l'Ours Ouest (lit. 'West Bear River') is a tributary of the rivière à l'Ours, flowing through the municipality of Havre-Saint-Pierre, in the Minganie Regional County Municipality, in the administrative region of Côte-Nord, in the province of Quebec, in Canada.

Except for the route 138 serving the lower part of the Bear River, this valley is served by winter snowmobile routes.

The surface of the West Bear River is usually frozen from the beginning of November to the end of April, except the rapids areas; however, traffic on the ice is generally safe from late November to early April.

== Geography ==
The West Bear River takes its source from an unidentified lake (length: 2.5 km (1.6 mi); altitude: 119 m (390 ft)) located in Havre-Saint-Pierre. This head lake is surrounded by a set of small lakes. The mouth of this head lake is located on the northeast shore. This mouth is located at:

- 40.3 km (25.0 mi) north-east of downtown Havre-Saint-Pierre;
- 24.9 km (15.5 mi) north-west of the mouth of the Bear River.

From the mouth of the head lake, the West Bear River flows over 28.4 km (17.6 mi) with a drop of 79.6 m (261 ft), especially in forest areas, according to following segments:

- 1.5 km (0.93 mi) towards the north-east by crossing four small lakes, then towards the south-east by crossing the fourth lake, to its mouth;
- 7.7 km (4.8 mi) south-east across Lake Cormier (length: 6.8 km (4.2 mi); altitude: 87.9 m (288 ft)), to its mouth;
- 3.3 km (2.1 mi) south-east across Lake Mannier (length: 2.9 km (1.8 mi); altitude: 85.6 m (281 ft)), to its mouth;
- 3.4 km (2.1 mi) south-east crossing Little Uatnakantuk lake (length: 3.3 km (2.1 mi); altitude: 76 m (249 ft)), up to its mouth;
- 2.2 km (1.4 mi) south-east, up to the outlet of the detour stream (coming from the south-west);
- 8.6 km (5.3 mi) first towards the south-east, then towards the east by forming a few loops, crossing areas of marsh, up to a river (coming from the north-west);
- 1.7 km (1.1 mi) to the east, forming a hook towards the north, to its mouth.

The West Bear River flows onto the southwest bank of the Rivière à l'Ours, in an area where there are several marsh areas. This confluence is located at:

- 2.1 km (1.3 mi) north of route 138;
- 4.3 km (2.7 mi) north-west of the mouth of Rivière à l'Ours;
- 21.1 km (13.1 mi) south-west of Baie-Johan-Beetz;
- 37 km (23 mi) north-east of the village center of Havre-Saint-Pierre.

From the mouth of the West Bear River, the current follows the course of the Bear River on 5.8 km (3.6 mi) towards the south-east, then crosses on 2.9 km (1.8 mi) east of Victor Bay until bypassing Victor Island, which is part of the north shore of the Estuary of Saint Lawrence.

== Toponymy ==
The toponym "Rivière à l'Ours Ouest" was formalized on December 5, 1968, at the Place Names Bank of the Commission de toponymie du Québec.

== See also ==
- List of rivers of Quebec
