= SS Iroquois =

SS Iroquois may refer to the following steamships:

- SS Iroquois (1888), built by William Cramp & Sons for the Clyde Line
- SS Iroquois (1900)
- SS Iroquois (1901), built by Craig Shipyards, Toledo, Ohio
- SS Iroquois (1927), built by Newport News Shipbuilding for the Clyde Line, served as hospital ship Solace (AH-5) during World War II.

== See also ==
- USS Iroquois
