= Rivière à la Carpe (Petite rivière Eusèbe) =

Location
- Country: Canada
- Province: Quebec
- Region: Saguenay-Lac-Saint-Jean
- MRC: Le Domaine-du-Roy
- TNO or Municipality: Lac-Ashuapmushuan and Saint-Félicien

Physical characteristics
- Source: Lake Eusèbe
  - location: Lac-Ashuapmushuan
  - coordinates: 48°37′07″N 72°37′20″W
  - elevation: 267 m (876 ft)
- Mouth: Ashuapmushuan River
  - location: Saint-Félicien
  - coordinates: 48°40′12″N 72°28′39″W
  - elevation: 120 m (390 ft)
- Length: 16.0 km (9.9 mi)

Basin features
- Progression: Petite rivière Eusèbe, Ashuapmushuan River, Lac Saint-Jean, Saguenay River
- Tributaries
  - left: (upstream)
  - right: (upstream) Discharge from Lac du Repos, discharge from a small unidentified lake.

The Carpe River is a tributary of Petite rivière Eusèbe, flowing in the unorganized territory of Lac-Ashuapmushuan and the municipality of Saint-Félicien, in the Le Domaine-du-Roy Regional County Municipality, in the administrative region of Saguenay–Lac-Saint-Jean, in the province from Quebec, to Canada.

This small valley is mainly accessible by Boulevard du Jardin (route 167).

Agriculture is the main economic activity in this valley.

The surface of the Carp River is usually frozen from the beginning of December to the end of March, except the rapids areas; however, safe traffic on the ice is generally from mid-December to mid-March.

== Geography ==
The Carpe river originates in Lake Eusèbe (length: 0.7 km (0.43 mi); altitude: 267 m (876 ft)) in the forest area in the western part of Saint-Félicien, in the unorganized territory of Lac-Ashuapmushuan. This source is located at:

- 1.2 km (0.75 mi) north-east of a curve in the course of the Rivière aux Saumons;
- 20.9 km (13.0 mi) south-west of the shore of lac Saint-Jean;
- 12.1 km (7.5 mi) south-west of the mouth of the Carpe river.

From its source, the Carp River flows over 16.0 km (9.9 mi) with a drop of 147 m (482 ft), crossing a few forest islets in the upper part, then agricultural for the rest of the course, according to the following segments:

- 8.0 km (5.0 mi) north-east, to the outlet (coming from the south) of Lac du Repos;
- 8.0 km (5.0 mi) to the east in an agricultural zone, successively cutting the Chemin du Lac-du-Repos, the Chemin du Rang Simple, and the Chemin du Rang Double, as well as collecting the stream Left (coming from the west), to its mouth.

The Carp river flows on the south bank of the Petite rivière Eusèbe. This confluence is located on the west side of Saint-Félicien, at:

- 0.85 km (0.53 mi) south-west of the bank of the Ashuapmushuan River;
- 12.5 km (7.8 mi) west of the mouth of the Ashuapmushuan river;
- 63 km (39 mi) west of downtown Alma.

From the mouth of the Carp river, the current descends successively the Petite rivière Eusèbe on 3.2 km (2.0 mi), the current descends the course of the Ashuapmushuan River towards the southeast on 11.4 km (7.1 mi), then crosses Lake Saint-Jean east on 41.1 km (25.5 mi) (ie its full length), follows the course of the Saguenay River via the Petite Décharge on 172.3 km (107.1 mi) eastwards to Tadoussac where it merges with the Estuary of Saint Lawrence.

== Toponymy ==
The toponym "rivière à la Carpe" was formalized on December 5, 1968, at the Place Names Bank of the Commission de toponymie du Québec.
