= Rivière à l'Ours (Minganie) =

Ours River Rivière à l'Ours
- Location within Quebec

Location
- Country: Canada
- Province: Quebec
- Region: Côte-Nord
- RCM: Minganie

Physical characteristics
- Mouth: Gulf of Saint Lawrence
  - coordinates: 50.298333°N 63.058056°W
  - elevation: 0 metres (0 ft)
- Basin size: 260 square kilometres (100 sq mi)

The Ours River (French: Rivière à l'Ours, Bear River) is a tributary of Gulf of Saint Lawrence, flowing in the municipality of Havre-Saint-Pierre, in the Minganie Regional County Municipality, in the administrative region of Côte-Nord, in the Province of Quebec, Canada.

Except for the route 138 serving the lower part of the Bear River, this valley is served by winter snowmobile routes.

The surface of the Bear River is usually frozen from the beginning of November to the end of April, except the rapids areas; however, safe circulation on the ice is generally done from the end of November to the beginning of April. .

== Location ==
The Ours River has two branches that join about 4 miles (6.4 km) from its mouth on the Gulf of Saint Lawrence. Both have many rapids and small falls, and are impassable by canoe. The mouth of the river is in the municipality of Havre-Saint-Pierre in the Minganie Regional County Municipality.

The Bear River has its source in Lac à l'Ours (Bear Lake) (length: 7.5 km (4.7 mi); altitude: 60 m (200 ft)) located in Havre-Saint-Pierre. This head lake surrounded by a set of small lakes and itself separated into two parts, because of two peninsulas, one of which stretches over 0.7 km (0.43 mi) to the south and the other stretches over 0.9 km (0.56 mi) to the north. The mouth of Lac à l'Ours is located on the south shore of an L-shaped bay stretching over 2.8 km (1.7 mi). This mouth is located at:

- 40.7 km (25.3 mi) north-east of downtown Havre-Saint-Pierre;
- 9.4 km (5.8 mi) north-west of the mouth of the Bear River.

From the mouth of Lac à l'Ours, the Rivière à l'Ours flows over 13.4 km (8.3 mi) with a drop of 60 m (200 ft), especially in forest areas, according to the following segments:

- 4.4 km (2.7 mi) towards the south by collecting the discharge (coming from the southwest) of a set of lakes, then the discharge (coming from the northeast) of a small lake, by forming a hook towards the west at the end of the segment, up to the outlet of a lake (coming from the west);
- 3.2 km (2.0 mi) first towards the south, then towards the south-east until the confluence of the rivière à l'Ours Ouest (coming from the west);
- 3.8 km (2.4 mi) south-east across marsh areas, to route 138 which runs along the north shore of the St. Lawrence River;
- 2.0 km (1.2 mi) by forming a large Z passing on the nor side of Mont Sainte-Geneviève, first towards the south, bifurcating towards the north, then towards the south-east, until its mouthpiece.

The Bear River flows to the bottom of a bay on the west shore of Victor Bay which is part of Grande Hermine Bay. The entrance to this bay, at the height of Victor Island, is 0.7 km (0.43 mi) wide. The entrance to the large bay is 1.0 km (0.62 mi) wide between Île à Victor and Île Puyjalon (east side). This large bay is located opposite Anticosti Island. This confluence is located at:

- 1.3 km (0.81 mi) south-east of route 138;
- 3.2 km (2.0 mi) south-west of the mouth of the rivière du Milieu;
- 18 km (11 mi) south-west of Baie-Johan-Beetz;
- 39 km (24 mi) north-east of the center of the village of Havre-Saint-Pierre.

From the mouth of the Bear River, the current crosses 2.9 km (1.8 mi) to the east of Baie Victor until bypassing Île à Victor, which is part of the shore north of estuary of Saint Lawrence.

The mouth empties in the Baie Victor, in the Mingan Archipelago National Park Reserve.

== Basin ==
The river drains Lac à l'Ours, Lac Kakuahkuepaniuhiht, Lac Malville, Petit lac Uatnakantuk, Lac à la Peur, Lac Mannier and Lac Cormier. The river basin covers 260 square kilometres (100 sq mi). It lies between the basins of the Romaine River to the west and the Corneille River to the east. It is partly in the unorganized territory of Lac-Jérôme and partly in the municipality of Havre-Saint-Pierre. The region around Lac à l'Ours can be reached by canoe from the Romaine, Puyjalon and Ours rivers, with only a few short portages, but the easiest access is by float plane. The region was explored by Henry de Puyjalon, Joseph Obalski and James Richardson (Note: James Richardson (1810-1883) was a Scottish immigrant to Canada who worked as a farm laborer, then a teacher before being engaged as an assistant on a series of expeditions by the Geological Survey of Canada. He was appointed a permanent "explorer" by the Geological Survey in 1856, having learned the basics of geology in the field. He undertook extensive and valuable work in Newfoundland and Quebec, and later in British Columbia. He was the first in Canada (in 1860) to photograph geological features. Richardson Inlet in the Queen Charlotte Islands was named in is honor in 1878 by George Mercer Dawson.) around the end of the 19th century, and various geologists visited the region after that.

== Terrain ==
The coastal plain is flat and marshy, with a layer of marine deposits. Inland the region is a peneplain or plateau in which the bedrock is almost continuously exposed. The surface is very irregular, deeply incised by many V-shaped valleys whose direction is determined by shear zones, faults, and by glacial action along the joints parallel to the ice movement. Average elevations of the hills are 400 feet (120 m), with the river bottoms 200 feet (61 m) lower.

== Environment ==
A map of the ecological regions of Quebec shows the river in sub-regions 6j-T and 6m-T of the east spruce/moss subdomain. As of 1966 most of the region had no trees, since a forest fire twenty years earlier had destroyed almost all the vegetation and burned the thin layer of humus that covered the rock. There were some trees remaining along the rivers, mostly balsam fir, spruce, birch and aspen. The area had many beaver, which were trapped by the Indians of the Mingan Reserve, but not so much as to wipe them out. Other common animals included otter, mink, hare, partridge, duck, bear and fox. There were few caribou or moose. The lakes hold landlocked salmon and brook trout.

== Toponymy ==
The name "Rivière à l'Ours" appears on a map dated 1960, and was made official on 5 December 1968.

The toponym "rivière à l'Ours" was formalized on December 5, 1968 at the Place Names Bank of the Commission de toponymie du Québec.

== Sources ==
- Depatie, J.-J (1966), Region du Lac à l'Ours (PDF) (in French), Gouvernement du Québec, Service de l'Exploration géologique
- Portrait préliminaire de la zone de gestion intégrée de l'eau par bassin versant Duplessis (PDF) (in French), OBV Duplessis, April 2015, archived from the original (PDF) on 2019-09-02
- Richeson, David R. (2003), "RICHARDSON, JAMES", Dictionary of Canadian Biography, vol. 11, University of Toronto/Université Laval
- Rivière à l'Ours (in French), Commission de toponymie du Québec
- Rivière à l'Ours, Natural Resources Canada
- Saucier, J.-P.; Robitaille, A.; Grondin, P.; Bergeron, J.-F.; Gosselin, J. (2011), Les régions écologiques du Québec méridional (PDF) (map), 4 (in French), Ministère des Ressources naturelles et de la Faune, archived from the original (PDF) on 2020-06-19
