= Iroquois Township =

Iroquois Township may refer to the following townships in the United States:

- Iroquois Township, Newton County, Indiana
- Iroquois Township, Iroquois County, Illinois
