= Saint-Prime =

- Municipality
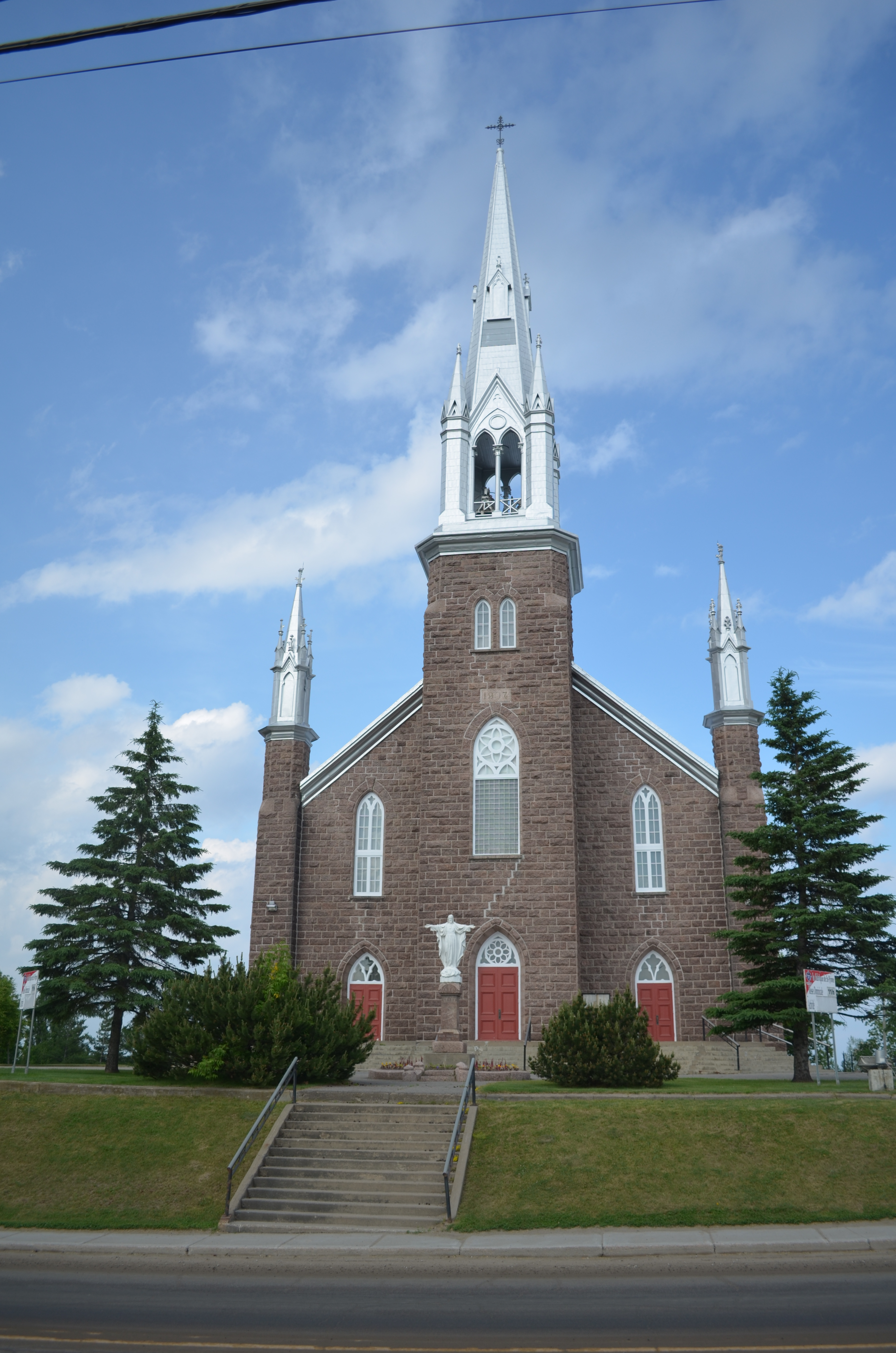
- The church of Saint-Prime
- Motto: Je cultive, Dieu fait croître ("I cultivate, God makes it grow")

- Location in Saguenay–Lac-Saint-Jean Quebec
- Coordinates: 48°35′N 72°20′W
- Country: Canada
- Province: Quebec
- Region: Saguenay–Lac-Saint-Jean
- RCM: Le Domaine-du-Roy
- Settled: 1862
- Constituted: June 29, 1968

Government
  - Mayor: Marie-Noëlle Bhérer
  - Federal riding: Lac-Saint-Jean
  - Prov. riding: Roberval

Area
  - Municipality: 160.70 km^{2} (62.05 sq mi)
  - Land: 147.16 km^{2} (56.82 sq mi)
  - Urban: 1.05 km^{2} (0.41 sq mi)

Population (2021)
  - Municipality: 2,760
  - Density: 18.8/km^{2} (49/sq mi)
  - Urban: 1,069
  - Urban density: 1,022.4/km^{2} (2,648/sq mi)
  - Pop (2016–21): ▲0.3%
  - Dwellings: 1,304
- Time zone: UTC−5 (EST)
  - Summer (DST): UTC−4 (EDT)
- Postal code(s): G8J 1T2
- Area codes: 418 and 581
- Highways: R-169
- Website: www.saint-prime.ca

Saint-Prime (French pronunciation: [sɛ̃ pʁim]) is a municipality in Quebec, Canada, located within the regional county municipality of Le Domaine-du-Roy. The municipality had a population of 2,760 as of the Canada 2021 Census, and a land area of 147.16 km^{2}.

== History ==
Saint-Prime owes its name to its first parish priest, Father Prime Girard. The first house in the area was built in 1864 by Francois Lapierre, at the time, the area was part of Roberval. The original municipality of Saint-Prime split away from Roberval on 1 January 1873. The original territory included the current cities Saint-Félicien, La Doré, Normandin, Albanel and parts of Saint-Édmond-les-Plaines and Dolbeau-Mistassini. That whole section eventually split away from Saint-Prime in 1882 when Saint-Félicien was founded (The other previously municipalities will enventually split from Saint-Félicien). In 1923, the village and the parish were split into two distinct municipalities. The population has remained stable since the 1920's, staying around 2,500 habitants. In 1968, the parish and the village merged to create the current municipality of Saint-Prime.

== Geography ==
=== Climate ===
Saint-Prime has a humid continental climate that is some way above the subarctic classification due to its warm summers. Winters, however, are very cold and the seasonal differences are severe, although not extreme by Canadian or Quebec standards. Precipitation levels are high, bringing much snowfall in winter, but are by no means extreme compared to adjacent areas.

Climate data for Saint-Prime
Month	Jan	Feb	Mar	Apr	May	Jun	Jul	Aug	Sep	Oct	Nov	Dec	Year
Record high °C (°F)	14 (57)	11 (52)	17.5 (63.5)	29 (84)	34 (93)	37 (99)	36.5 (97.7)	34.5 (94.1)	35.5 (95.9)	25.5 (77.9)	21 (70)	11.5 (52.7)	37 (99)
Mean daily maximum °C (°F)	−10.1 (13.8)	−7.7 (18.1)	−1.0 (30.2)	7.7 (45.9)	16.6 (61.9)	22.2 (72.0)	24.4 (75.9)	23.3 (73.9)	18.1 (64.6)	10.1 (50.2)	2.1 (35.8)	−6.1 (21.0)	8.2 (46.8)
Daily mean °C (°F)	−17.0 (1.4)	−14.2 (6.4)	−7.3 (18.9)	2.3 (36.1)	10.1 (50.2)	15.9 (60.6)	18.4 (65.1)	17.1 (62.8)	12.1 (53.8)	5.5 (41.9)	−2.0 (28.4)	−11.4 (11.5)	2.5 (36.5)
Mean daily minimum °C (°F)	−23.1 (−9.6)	−20.8 (−5.4)	−13.6 (7.5)	−3.3 (26.1)	3.5 (38.3)	9.4 (48.9)	12.3 (54.1)	10.9 (51.6)	6.8 (44.2)	0.9 (33.6)	−6.0 (21.2)	−16.7 (1.9)	−3.3 (26.1)
Record low °C (°F)	−44.5 (−48.1)	−41.5 (−42.7)	−37.5 (−35.5)	−27 (−17)	−7.5 (18.5)	−3.5 (25.7)	2 (36)	−1 (30)	−7 (19)	−10 (14)	−26.5 (−15.7)	−44.5 (−48.1)	−44.5 (−48.1)
Average rainfall mm (inches)	55.3 (2.18)	46.1 (1.81)	50.0 (1.97)	57.7 (2.27)	65.4 (2.57)	75.9 (2.99)	118.3 (4.66)	79.2 (3.12)	84.2 (3.31)	64.3 (2.53)	72.7 (2.86)	64.2 (2.53)	833.2 (32.80)

== Demographics ==
Population trend:

- Population in 2021: 2,760 (2016 to 2021 population change: 0.3%)
- Population in 2016: 2,753
- Population in 2011: 2,758
- Population in 2006: 2,661
- Population in 2001: 2,702
- Population in 1996: 2,685
- Population in 1991: 2,522
- Population in 1986: 2,499
- Population in 1981: 2,522
- Population in 1976: 2,266
- Population in 1971: 2,350

Private dwellings occupied by usual residents: 1,178 (total dwellings: 1,304)

Mother tongue:

- English as first language: 0.4%
- French as first language: 98.4%
- English and French as first language: 0.2%
- Other as first language: 1.1%

== See also ==
- Le Domaine-du-Roy Regional County Municipality
- Lac Saint-Jean, a waterbody
- Rivière à l'Ours (Ashuapmushuan River)
- Rivière du Castor (rivière à l'Ours)
- Ovide River
- Rivière aux Iroquois
- Rivière à la Chasse (lac Saint-Jean)
