= Ouiatchouaniche River =

Ouiatchouaniche River Old name: "Rivière du Tremblay"

Location
- Country: Canada
- Province: Quebec
- Region: Saguenay-Lac-Saint-Jean
- MRC: Le Domaine-du-Roy Regional County Municipality

Physical characteristics
- Source: Quentin Lake
  - location: Lac-Ashuapmushuan
  - coordinates: 48°09′41″N 72°25′27″W
  - elevation: 301 m (988 ft)
- Mouth: Lac Saint-Jean
  - location: Roberval
  - coordinates: 48°31′35″N 72°13′21″W
  - elevation: 101 m (331 ft)
- Length: 65.7 km (40.8 mi)

Basin features
- Progression: Lac Saint-Jean, Saguenay River
- Tributaries
  - left: (upstream) 12 streams, discharge from a set of lakes including Creux lakes, at Aimé and Beemer; Dam: discharge (via Lake Valley) from Lake Saint-Pierre, discharge (via lake Vallée) du lac Otarie, stream (via lac Vallée), stream (via lac Edmond), 8 streams, discharge of a set of lakes, discharge of a lake, discharge of two lakes, discharge of two small lakes, discharge from an unidentified lake, discharge from a group of lakes including Saugues lake, discharge from an unidentified lake, discharge from 4 lakes including Lac Sainte-Croix, discharge from Lake Chabanel, discharge from two lakes, discharge from a lake, outlet (via Lac Gareau) from an unidentified lake, outlet from Surprise Lake, stream.
  - right: (upstream) Unidentified stream, Bidoune stream, unidentified stream, Guay stream, Morin stream; Dam: unidentified stream, outlet of Castor lake and Arthur lake, outlet of a lake, unidentified stream, discharge from a lake, Ouellet stream, discharge from Long Summer Lake and Eastern Lake, discharge from Deep Lake, discharge (via Lake Thomas-James) from a set of lakes, discharge (via Lac Thomas-James) from Lac de la Truite Callée, discharge from two small lakes, stream, discharge (via Lac Quentin) from Lac Couture.

The Ouiatchouaniche River is a tributary of Lac Saint-Jean, flowing successively in the unorganized territory of Lac-Ashuapmushuan, the municipality of Sainte-Hedwidge and the city of Roberval, in the Le Domaine-du-Roy Regional County Municipality, in the administrative region of Saguenay–Lac-Saint-Jean, in the province of Quebec, in Canada.

The upper part of the Ouiatchouaniche river valley is served by forest roads.

Forestry is the main economic activity in the upper and intermediate part of this valley; agriculture, in the lower part, except the urban area near the mouth.

The surface of the Ouiatchouaniche River is usually frozen from the beginning of December to the end of March, except the rapids areas; however, traffic on the ice is generally safe from mid-December to mid-March.

== Geography ==
The Ouiatchouaniche river has its source in Lake Quentin (length: 0.38 km (0.24 mi); altitude: 387 m (1,270 ft)) in the unorganized territory of Lac-Ashuapmushuan. This lake is mainly supplied by the outlet (coming from the east) from Couture lake and the outlet (coming from the south) from an unidentified lake. This source is located at:

- 12.0 km (7.5 mi) west of Lac des Commissaires;
- 40.2 km (25.0 mi) south-west of the village center of Chambord;
- 43.3 km (26.9 mi) south-west of the mouth of the Ouiatchouaniche River.

From its source, the Ouiatchouaniche river flows over 65.7 km (40.8 mi) with a drop of 286 m (938 ft), according to the following segments:

Upper course of the Ouiatchouaniche river (segment of 22.3 km (13.9 mi))

Note: In forest area.

- 7.8 km (4.8 mi) towards the north by crossing a small lake, by collecting the discharge (coming from the west) of Surprise lake, by crossing Gareau lake (length: 0.74 km (0.46 mi); altitude: 375 m (1,230 ft)) and crossing Lake Thomas-James (length: 2.1 km (1.3 mi); altitude: 362 m (1,188 ft)), up to at its mouth;
- 5.5 km (3.4 mi) towards the north by collecting the discharge (coming from the west) of a set of lakes including Lac Sainte-Croix, crossing one of the Jumeaux lakes, up to the discharge of Long Summer Lake and East Lake;
- 9.0 km (5.6 mi) first by winding northwest to the outlet (coming from the southwest) of a small lake; then by winding towards the north, collecting successively the discharge (coming from the south) from Lac du Seuil, the discharge (coming from the west) from an unidentified lake, the discharge (coming from the east) from a stream, the outlet (coming from the south) from an unidentified lake, the outlet (coming from the east) from a stream, the outlet (coming from the north) from a small lake, the outlet (coming from the south) from another lake, to a stream (coming from the southwest);

Intermediate course of the Ouiatchouaniche river upstream of the dam (segment of 20.1 km (12.5 mi))

Note: In forest area.

- 6.5 km (4.0 mi) towards the north by winding, by collecting the discharge (coming from the south) of a lake, by collecting a stream (coming from the West);
- 6.5 km (4.0 mi) to the north by collecting a stream (coming from the east) crossing marsh areas, to the south shore of Lake Edmond;
- 7.1 km (4.4 mi) to the north, subsequently crossing Lake Edmond (length: 0.9 km (0.56 mi); altitude: 303 m (994 ft)) and Lake Valley (length : 3.8 km (2.4 mi); altitude: 303 m (994 ft)) which is formed by the widening of the river and is surrounded by marshes, until its mouth, that is the dam "La Little Fall". Note: Lac Vallée receives the outlet (coming from the west) from Lac Saint-Pierre.

Intermediate course of the Ouiatchouaniche river (between the dam and the village) (segment of 7.6 km (4.7 mi))

Note: In forest area.

- 4.5 km (2.8 mi) first towards the east by crossing a series of rapids up to a bend in the river; then towards the north, collecting the discharge (coming from the west) of a set of lakes including Lac Creux, at Aimé and Beemer, by forming a hook towards the northeast, up to the discharge (coming from the west) of Lac du Curé;
- 1.2 km (0.75 mi) towards the north by forming a hook towards the east while crossing a first series of rapids; then north, crossing a second series of rapids, up to a bend in the river;
- 1.9 km (1.2 mi) eastwards passing south of the village of Sainte-Hedwidge-de-Roberval, to a bend in the river, corresponding to a stream (coming from the south-east); then north through the village, up to a bend in the river, corresponding to a stream (coming from the south-east); then north, crossing the village, to Guay stream (coming from the east);

Lower section of the Ouiatchouaniche river (segment of 15.7 km (9.8 mi))

Note: First in forest area, then agricultural.

- 6.3 km (3.9 mi) to the north, forming a loop to the west, up to a bend in the river;
- 1.8 km (1.1 mi) towards the northeast by entering the agricultural zone, while crossing islets of forest, up to a bend in the river;
- 7.6 km (4.7 mi) to the east by forming some streamers and crossing some rapids by forming a large curve towards the north, crossing rue Saint-Dominique, boulevard Marcotte, boul. Horace-J.Beemer, the railway and Saint-Joseph Boulevard, to its mouth.

The Ouiatchouaniche river flows on the southwest bank of lac Saint-Jean. This confluence is located on the north side of the city of Roberval, either:

- 6.2 km (3.9 mi) south-east of the center of the village of Pointe-Bleue;
- 15.9 km (9.9 mi) north-west of the center of the village of Chambord.

From the mouth of the Ouiatchouaniche river, the current crosses Lake Saint-Jean for 34.5 km (21.4 mi) towards the northeast, follows the course of the Saguenay River via the Petite Décharge on 172.3 km (107.1 mi) eastwards to Tadoussac where it merges with the Estuary of Saint Lawrence.

== Use of the territory ==
The south of the basin is located in the forest zone. From the southern limit of Sainte-Hedwidge, the river flows from agroforestry areas that are not under cultivation. Finally, the last kilometers downstream are located in agricultural areas, although they are not under cultivation. The river flows through two urban agglomerations, Sainte-Hedwidge and Roberval.

The only protected area along the watercourse is the habitat of the Lac Vallée muskrat (77 ha (190 acres)). The river also serves as a limit to the zec de la Lièvre.

== Toponymy ==
The term "Ouiatchouaniche" is of Innu origin; it is a diminutive of "Ouiatchouan". This last term turns out to be the name of a river flowing into Lac Saint-Jean 9.9 km (6.2 mi) to the southwest. Locally, this watercourse is designated “Rivière du Tremblay”. The second part of the term "Ouiatchouaniche" can also resemble "Ouananiche", which turns out to be the name of a river whose confluence with Lac Saint-Jean is 7.9 km (4.9 mi) to the southwest.

During a voyage of exploration in 1732, the surveyors Joseph-Laurent Normandin pointed out in his report the "Petite rivière 8iatch8anonchiche". This name translates to the little "river where the current is". The Journals of the Lower Canada House of Assembly for the year 1823-1824 indicate Ouigatshouanish. Old graphic variants of the toponym: Ouiatchouanish, Uiatchganish and Wiatshunanitsh

The toponym "Ouiatchouaniche river" was formalized on December 5, 1968, at the Place Names Bank of the Commission de toponymie du Québec.
