= Sainte-Hedwidge =

- Municipality
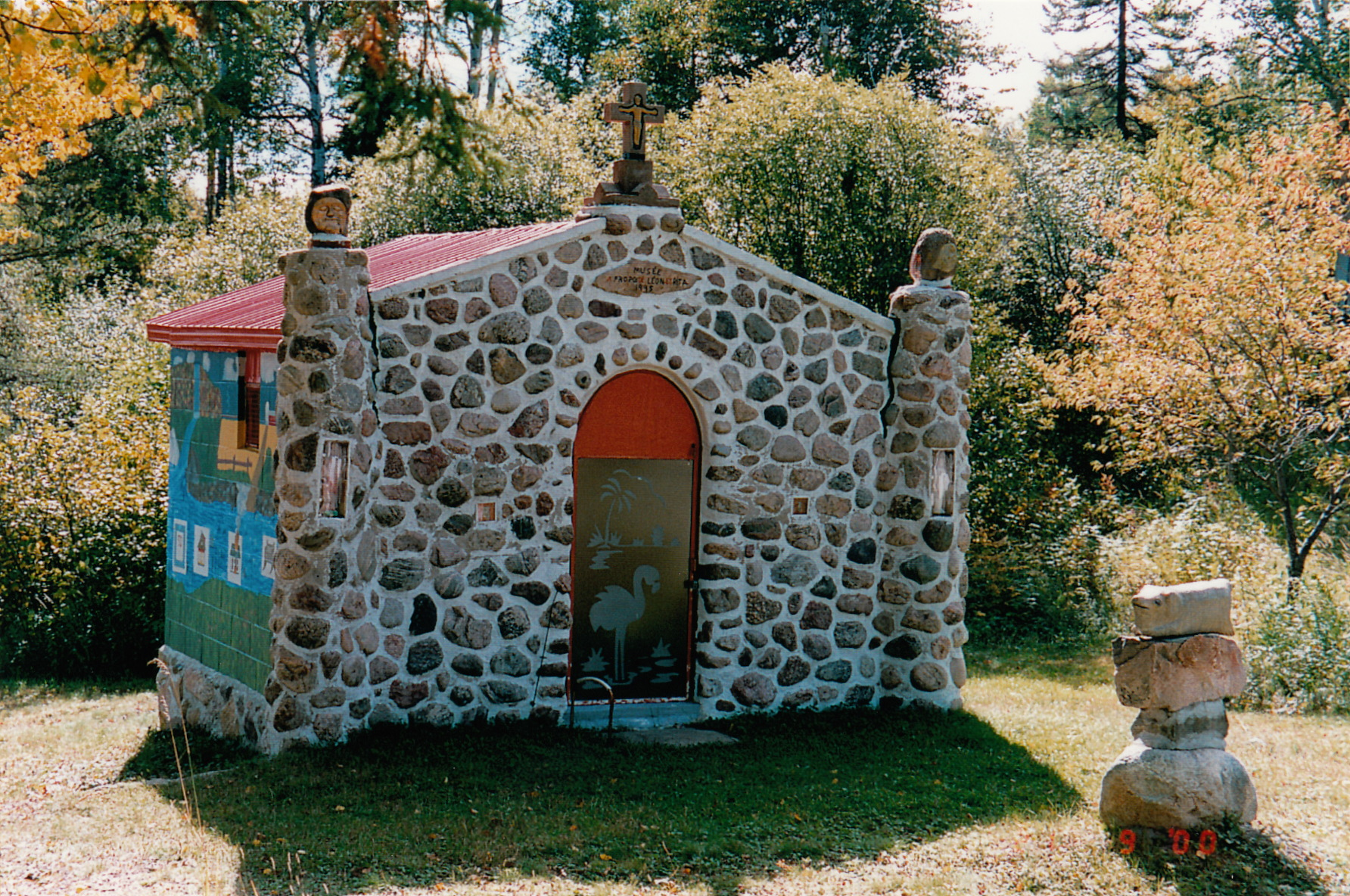
- Sculptures in Sainte-Hedwidge

- Location in Saguenay–Lac-Saint-Jean Quebec.
- Coordinates: 48°29′N 72°21′W
- Country: Canada
- Province: Quebec
- Region: Saguenay–Lac-Saint-Jean
- RCM: Le Domaine-du-Roy
- Settled: 1887
- Constituted: March 10, 1909
- Named for: Hedwig of Silesia

Government
  - Mayor: Guy Privé
  - Federal riding: Lac-Saint-Jean
  - Prov. riding: Roberval

Area (2021)
  - Total: 475.50 km^{2} (183.59 sq mi)
  - Land: 461.67 km^{2} (178.25 sq mi)

Population (2021)
  - Total: 870
  - Density: 1.9/km^{2} (4.9/sq mi)
  - Pop (2016–21): ▲2.8%
  - Dwellings: 494
- Time zone: UTC−05:00 (EST)
  - Summer (DST): UTC−04:00 (EDT)
- Postal code(s): G0W 2R0
- Area codes: 418 and 581

Sainte-Hedwidge (French pronunciation: [sɛ̃t ɛdwidʒ]) is a municipality in Quebec, Canada. The community is sometimes known as Sainte-Hedwidge-de-Roberval.

== Demographics ==
Federal census population history of Sainte-Hedwidge
| Year | Pop. | ±% |
|---|---|---|
| 1911 | 331 | — |
| 1921 | 491 | +48.3% |
| 1931 | 599 | +22.0% |
| 1941 | 850 | +41.9% |
| 1951 | 1,036 | +21.9% |
| 1956 | 1,077 | +4.0% |
| 1961 | 1,195 | +11.0% |
| 1966 | 1,133 | −5.2% |
| 1971 | 1,107 | −2.3% |
| 1976 | 966 | −12.7% |
| 1981 | 942 | −2.5% |
| 1986 | 929 | −1.4% |
| 1991 | 879 | −5.4% |
| 1996 | 863 | −1.8% |
| 2001 | 843 | −2.3% |
| 2006 | 820 | −2.7% |
| 2011 | 824 | +0.5% |
| 2016 | 846 | +2.7% |
| 2021 | 870 | +2.8% |
Source: Statistics Canada; 2021 Canadian census, 2016 Canadian census, 2011 Canadian census, 2006 Canadian census, 2001 Canadian census, 1996 Canadian census

Private dwellings occupied by usual residents: 390 (total dwellings: 494)

Mother tongue:

- English as first language: 0%
- French as first language: 99.4%
- English and French as first language: 0.6%
- Other as first language: 0%

== See also ==
- Le Domaine-du-Roy Regional County Municipality
- Lac Saint-Jean, a waterbody
- Rivière du Castor (rivière à l'Ours)
- Ovide River
- Petite rivière à l'Ours (rivière à l'Ours) - South
- Rivière aux Iroquois
- Deuxième bras des Iroquois, un cours d'eau
- Rivière à la Chasse (lac Saint-Jean)
- Ouiatchouaniche River
