= Zec de la Lièvre =

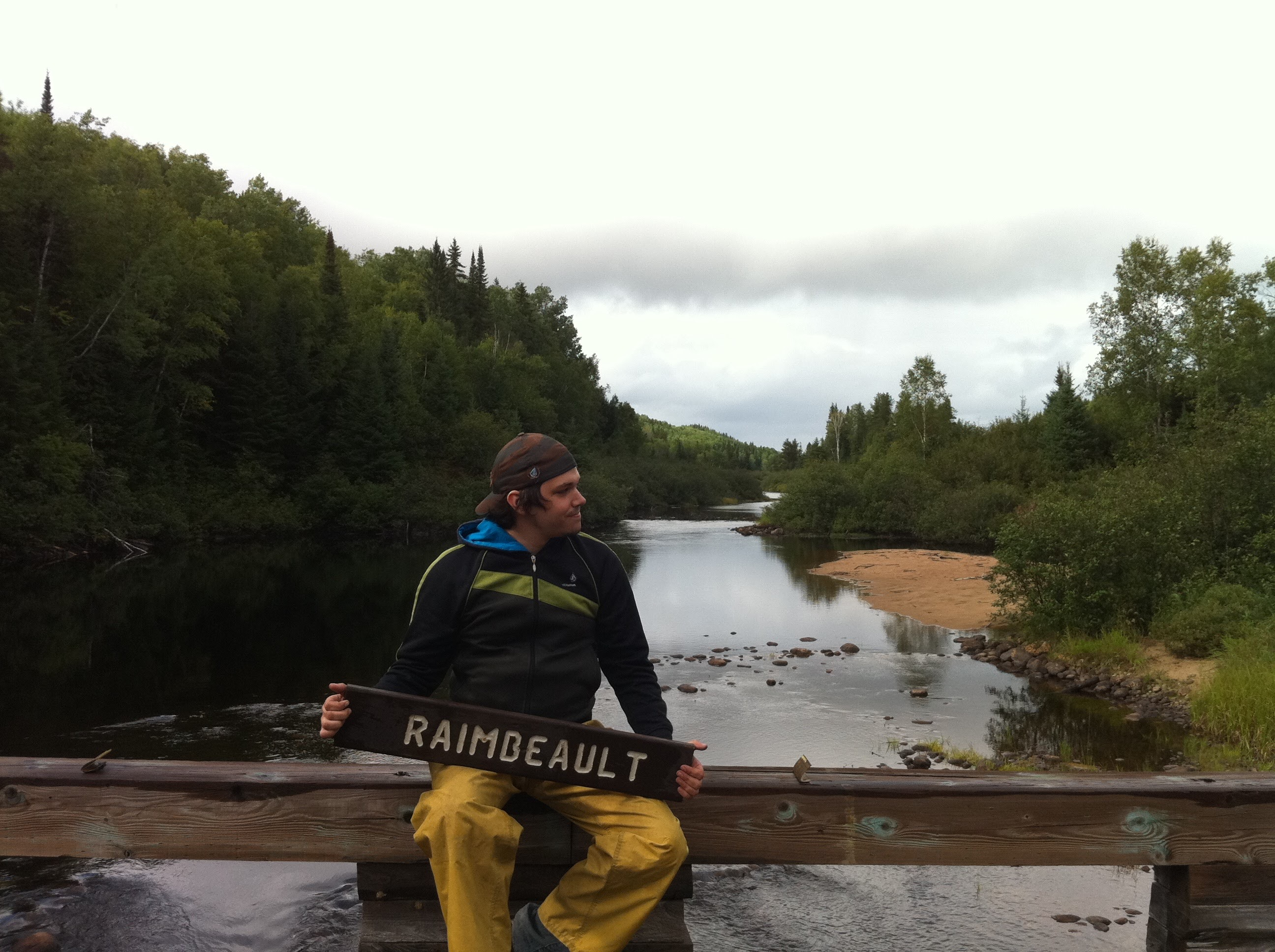
- Interactive map of Zec de la Lièvre
- Location: Canada, Quebec, Le Domaine-du-Roy Regional County Municipality
- Nearest city: Lac-Ashuapmushuan, unorganized territory
- Coordinates: 48°21′00″N 72°37′00″W
- Area: 964 km (599.00 mi)
- Established: 1978
- Website: Official website

The Zec de la Lièvre (English: "Zec of Hare") is a zone d'exploitation contrôlée (controlled harvesting zone) (ZEC) in the unorganized territory of Lac-Ashuapmushuan, in Le Domaine-du-Roy Regional County Municipality, in the administrative region of Saguenay-Lac-Saint-Jean, in Quebec, in Canada.

== Geography ==
The northeastern boundary of this forested area of 974 square kilometres (376 sq mi) of the ZEC starts at about twenty kilometers (direct line) southwest of Lac Saint-Jean or near the village of Sainte-Hedwidge. ZEC has nearly 400 lakes.

On the east side, the ZEC is bounded by two major rivers, the rivers Ouiatchouaniche and Croche. The largest lakes in area are Panache Lake, "des Casques" (Helmets), "aux Eaux-Mortes" and "De la Baie" (the Bay). The latest delimitation of the ZEC was defined in October 1991.

Rivers

Segments of some streams and rivers crossing the west of the ZEC belong to the upper watershed system of Saint-Maurice River, such as rivers Raimbault, "à la Corne" (to the Horn) and Croche.

Having a length of about 60 km, the La Lièvre River rises in lake Giroux, formerly referred to as "Lac de la Lièvre" (Lake of the Rabbit). Flowing south, the La Lièvre River constitutes the western boundary of the ZEC over 40 km. Then the river flows into the Trenche river, a major tributary of the Saint-Maurice River where the waters flow to Trois-Rivières.

Camping and services

ZEC offers hundreds of campsites, of which three campgrounds around the lake Brosseau and one at lake Labonté. The main ZEC reception station is located near Saint-Hedwidge. The second entrance station is located south of the ZEC, near "Lac aux Goélands" (Lake of the Gulls).

The snowmobile trail and mountain bike cross from east to west the territory of the ZEC.

== Logging operations on "La Lièvre" ==
In the past, logging were the predominant economic activity in the territory of the ZEC, including the former logging camp "Dépôt-de-la-Lièvre" has been in operation for over 70 years.

At the height of operations in the sector of rivière La Lièvre, "Veillet et Frères Limitée" contracted between 3000 and 3500 workers assigned to the timber (through sub-contractors). The work of cutting wood was distributed among 45 to 50 forest contractors. Following the death of Jeffrey Veillet, which occurred in 1946, Consolidated Paper has taken over directly woodcutting. The company "Veillet & Frères Limitée" was dissolved in 1947.

== Hunting and Fishing ==
In water bodies of Zec, aquatic fauna is composed mainly of brook trout and northern pike.

In the ZEC, the wild animals are abundant and varied (mainly): moose, american black bear, hare, ruffed grouse and grouse. The hunting quotas are depending on by periods of the year, sectors, hunting gear and sex of animals (moose). Based on zec's record, in 2011, a total of 100 moose (43 males, 54 females and 3 calves) were harvested in the territory of the ZEC.

== Toponymy ==
The name of the ZEC has its origins in the former name of the main headwater lake, the Giroux Lake (formerly named "lac La Lièvre") which flows into the La Lièvre River running through the ZEC. Despite a temporary designation Raimbault River in 1917, the popular name for the river contained several variants: Little Hare River, River Little Hare, The Hare and The Hare Grosse. Although the French word "lièvre" (rabbit) is masculine, feminine remains by removing the term "river", to denote the "rivière La Lièvre" (Hare River).

The name "Zec de la Lièvre" was formalized on December 18, 1986 at the Bank of place names in the Commission de toponymie du Québec (Geographical Names Board of Quebec).

== See also ==
- Lac-Ashuapmushuan, unorganized territory
- Le Domaine-du-Roy Regional County Municipality, (RCM)
- Saguenay-Lac-Saint-Jean, administrative region
- Sainte-Hedwidge municipality near the ZEC
- Raimbault River
- River at Horn
- Croche River
- Ouiatchouaniche River
- Jeffrey Veillet, lumberman in "La lièvre" sector
- Zone d'exploitation contrôlée (Controlled Harvesting Zone)
