= Roberval, Quebec =

Roberval
- City
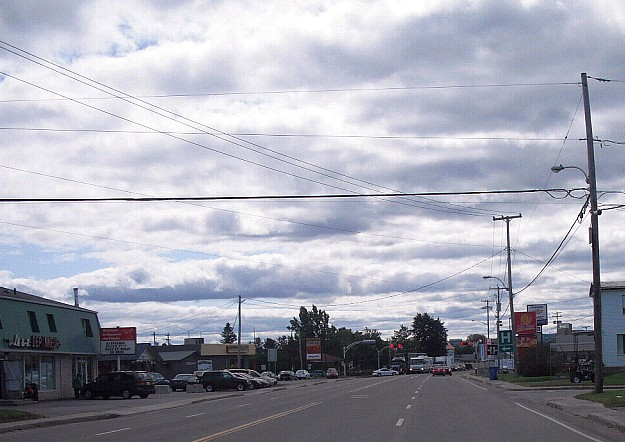
- Route 169

- Coat of arms

- Location in Saguenay–Lac-Saint-Jean Quebec
- Coordinates: 48°31′04″N 72°13′19″W
- Country: Canada
- Province: Quebec
- Region: Saguenay–Lac-Saint-Jean
- RCM: Le Domaine-du-Roy
- Settled: 1850s
- Constituted: December 23, 1976

Government
  - Mayor: Jean-Francois Boily
  - Federal riding: Lac-Saint-Jean
  - Prov. riding: Roberval

Area
  - City: 200.80 km^{2} (77.53 sq mi)
  - Land: 151.36 km^{2} (58.44 sq mi)
  - Urban: 5.36 km^{2} (2.07 sq mi)

Population (2021)
  - City: 9,840
  - Density: 65/km^{2} (170/sq mi)
  - Urban: 8,056
  - Urban density: 1,503.4/km^{2} (3,894/sq mi)
  - Pop (2016–21): ▼2.1%
  - Dwellings: 4,838
- Time zone: UTC−05:00 (EST)
  - Summer (DST): UTC−04:00 (EDT)
- Postal code(s): G8H
- Area codes: 418 and 581
- Highways: R-169
- Website: www.ville.roberval.qc.ca

Roberval (French pronunciation: [ʁɔbɛʁval]) is a city on the south-western shore of Lac Saint-Jean in the Le Domaine-du-Roy Regional County Municipality of Quebec, Canada. With a population of 9,840 in the Canada 2021 Census, it is the fourth largest city on this lake after Alma, Dolbeau-Mistassini and Saint-Félicien. It is the seat of the Domaine-du-Roy RCM and the main service centre for the region with a hospital and some government services. It is also the seat of the judicial district of Roberval.

It is the only Lac Saint-Jean town whose core is directly on the lakeshore.

Benoît Bouchard, former cabinet Minister and Canadian Ambassador in France, and Michel Gauthier, former federal Leader of the Opposition, represented the area in the federal parliament. Bernard Lord the former Premier of New Brunswick was born here.

Roberval was the 2008 winner of Kraft Hockeyville. In their newly renovated arena, Roberval hosted an NHL preseason game between the Montreal Canadiens and the Buffalo Sabres on September 23, 2008.

Roberval is the home of the Traversée internationale du lac St-Jean, an annual swimming competition held since 1955. The major competition feature the crossing of Lake St-Jean over a distance of 32 km (20 mi). The 2010 FINA World Open Water Swimming Championships were also hosted in Roberval.

== History ==
Circa 1850, the first settlers began to colonize the area, followed afterwards by families especially from the Charlevoix area. The settlement, the oldest village on the shores of Lake Saint-Jean, was first known as Notre-Dame-du-Lac-Saint-Jean, named after the parish founded in 1854. A few years later in 1857, the Municipality of Lac-Saint-Jean was formed but in 1859 was split into several municipalities including the Municipality of Roberval. It was named after the geographic township of Roberval, which in turn was named by surveyor Joseph Bouchette in honour of the first Lieutenant General of New France Jean-François de la Roque de Roberval (1496–1560). In 1862, the Roberval post office opened.

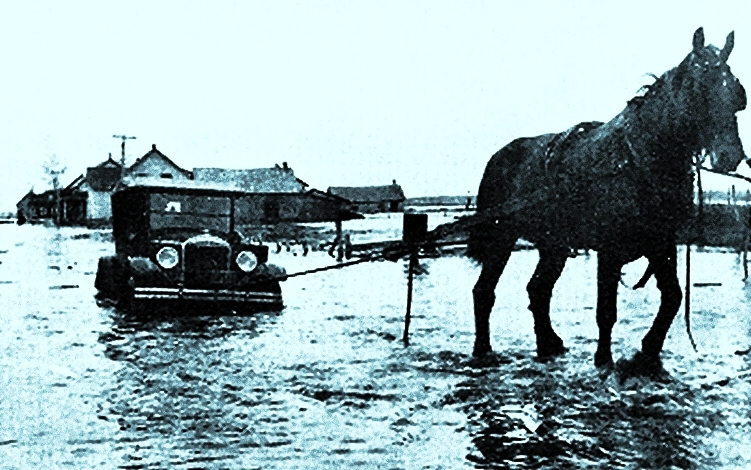
Flood in Roberval in 1928

In 1884, the settlement separated from the municipality to form the Village Municipality of Roberval. It experienced rapid growth in the 1880s when Horace Jansen Beemer, an American entrepreneur from Philadelphia, came to Roberval. He established logging and sawmill businesses and led the construction of the railroad to Quebec City in 1888. Beemer personally took care of logging, land speculation, and construction of railway bridges. He also built a tourist complex in Roberval in 1898, centred on fishing for landlocked salmon and organized excursions to the Grande Décharge (outlet of Lake Saint-Jean). A fire destroyed the Grand Hotel Roberval in 1908, putting an abrupt end to luxury tourism in the Lake Saint-Jean area.

In 1903, the village of Roberval gained town (ville) status, and in 1956, city (cité) status. In 1976, it merged with the Municipality of Roberval to form the current city.

== Geography ==
=== Climate ===
Roberval has a cold and highly seasonal humid continental climate (Köppen Dfb), with mild summers, cold winters and high annual snowfall. Due to seasonal lag and influence from the nearby lake, September is well above the subarctic threshold as the fourth warmest month.

Climate data for Roberval, Quebec
Month	Jan	Feb	Mar	Apr	May	Jun	Jul	Aug	Sep	Oct	Nov	Dec	Year
Record high °C (°F)	14.5 (58.1)	11.5 (52.7)	17.8 (64.0)	30.9 (87.6)	34.2 (93.6)	35.8 (96.4)	36.5 (97.7)	37.8 (100.0)	33.1 (91.6)	25.8 (78.4)	20.8 (69.4)	12.2 (54.0)	37.8 (100.0)
Mean daily maximum °C (°F)	−11.1 (12.0)	−8.0 (17.6)	−1.5 (29.3)	7.0 (44.6)	15.8 (60.4)	21.5 (70.7)	23.7 (74.7)	22.5 (72.5)	17.4 (63.3)	9.8 (49.6)	1.5 (34.7)	−6.3 (20.7)	7.7 (45.9)
Daily mean °C (°F)	−16.4 (2.5)	−13.4 (7.9)	−6.9 (19.6)	1.9 (35.4)	9.9 (49.8)	15.6 (60.1)	18.3 (64.9)	17.1 (62.8)	12.3 (54.1)	5.4 (41.7)	−2.3 (27.9)	−10.9 (12.4)	2.6 (36.7)
Mean daily minimum °C (°F)	−21.7 (−7.1)	−18.8 (−1.8)	−12.2 (10.0)	−3.2 (26.2)	3.9 (39.0)	9.7 (49.5)	12.9 (55.2)	11.6 (52.9)	7.1 (44.8)	1.0 (33.8)	−6.1 (21.0)	−15.4 (4.3)	−2.6 (27.3)
Record low °C (°F)	−38.6 (−37.5)	−38.9 (−38.0)	−33.1 (−27.6)	−24.5 (−12.1)	−10.6 (12.9)	−2.2 (28.0)	3.9 (39.0)	0.0 (32.0)	−4.4 (24.1)	−11.7 (10.9)	−24.2 (−11.6)	−39.2 (−38.6)	−39.2 (−38.6)
Average precipitation mm (inches)	54.5 (2.15)	43.7 (1.72)	51.7 (2.04)	63.2 (2.49)	73.9 (2.91)	82.9 (3.26)	105.7 (4.16)	86.2 (3.39)	84.0 (3.31)	71.2 (2.80)	84.2 (3.31)	63.8 (2.51)	864.9 (34.05)
Average rainfall mm (inches)	4.5 (0.18)	3.3 (0.13)	13.6 (0.54)	36.0 (1.42)	69.0 (2.72)	82.9 (3.26)	105.7 (4.16)	86.2 (3.39)	83.9 (3.30)	63.5 (2.50)	36.3 (1.43)	9.4 (0.37)	594.2 (23.39)
Average snowfall cm (inches)	51.6 (20.3)	41.6 (16.4)	39.7 (15.6)	26.2 (10.3)	4.8 (1.9)	0.0 (0.0)	0.0 (0.0)	0.0 (0.0)	0.1 (0.0)	7.7 (3.0)	48.5 (19.1)	56.9 (22.4)	277.1 (109.1)
Source: Environment Canada

== Demographics ==
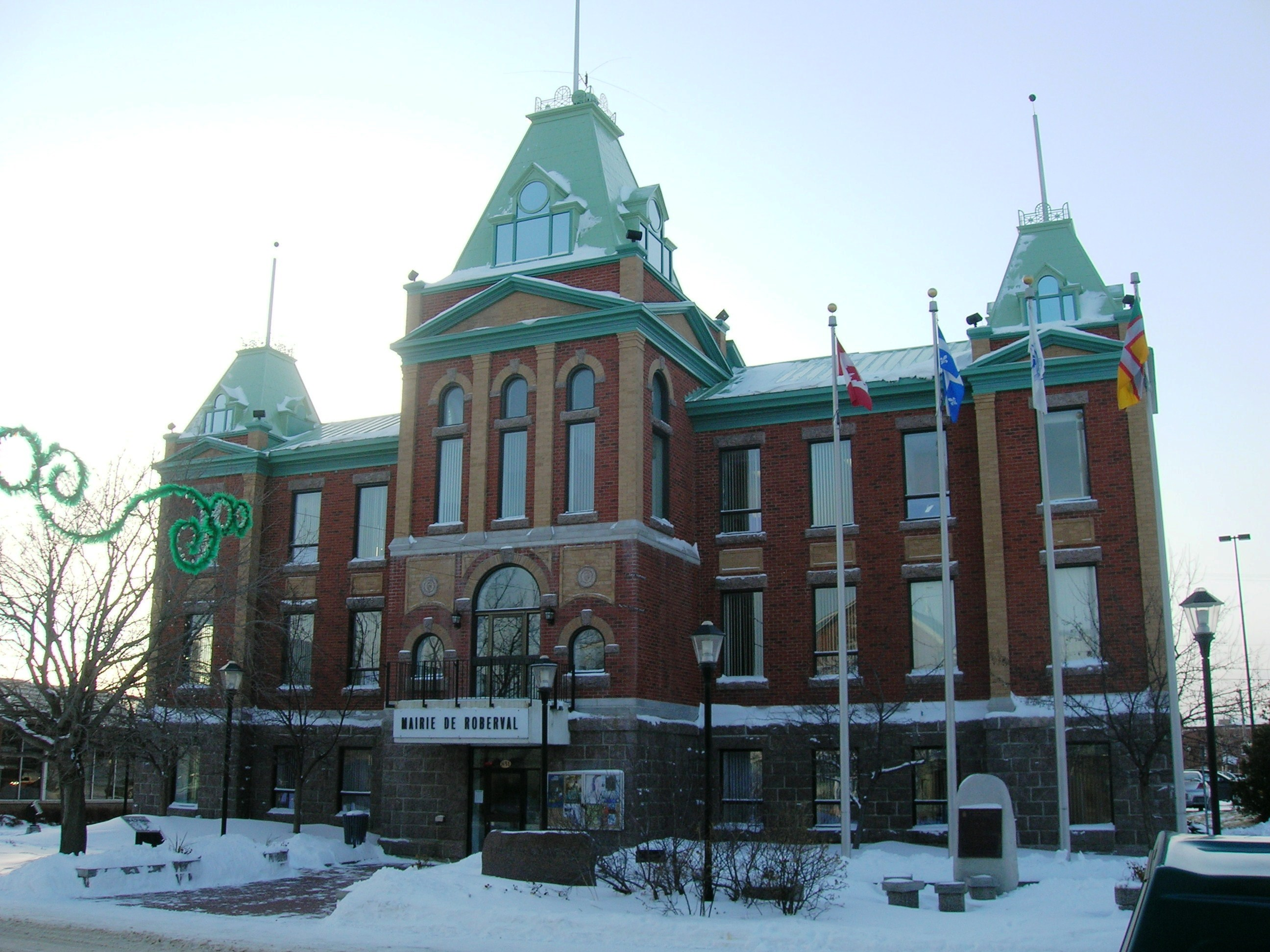
Roberval City Hall, a National Historic Site of Canada

In the 2021 Census of Population conducted by Statistics Canada, Roberval had a population of 9,840 living in 4,520 of its 4,838 total private dwellings, a change of −2.1% from its 2016 population of 10,046. With a land area of 151.36 km^{2} (58.44 sq mi), it had a population density of 65.0/km^{2} (168.4/sq mi) in 2021.

In 2021, the median age was 52.4, as opposed to 41.6 for all of Canada. French was the mother tongue of 98.0% of residents in 2021. The next most common mother tongues were Atikamekw at 0.8%, followed by Arabic, English, and Spanish at 0.3%. 0.2% reported both English and French as their first language. Additionally there were 0.5% who reported both French and a non-official language as their mother tongue.

As of 2021, Indigenous peoples comprised 11.0% of the population, most of whom were First Nations, and visible minorities contributed 0.8%. The largest visible minority groups in Dolbeau-Mistassini are Latin American (0.3%) and Black (0.2%).

In 2021, 79.8% of the population identified as Catholic, a 14.6% decrease from 2011, while 13.6% said they had no religious affiliation. Baptists were the largest religious minority, making up 0.3% of the population.

Counting both single and multiple responses, the most commonly identified ethnocultural ancestries were:

Ethnic origin	2021
Canadian	42.2%
French	18.1%
Québécois	15.9%
French Canadian	10.9%
First Nations	6.1%
Innu	3.5%
Métis	1.4%

(Percentages may total more than 100% due to rounding and multiple responses).

Historical Census Data - Roberval, Quebec

Year	Pop.	±%
1891	783	—
1901	1,248	+59.4%
1911	1,737	+39.2%
1921	2,068	+19.1%
1931	2,770	+33.9%
1941	3,220	+16.2%
1951	4,897	+52.1%

Year	Pop.	±%
1956	6,648	+35.8%
1961	7,739	+16.4%
1966	8,552	+10.5%
1971	8,330	−2.6%
1976	8,543	+2.6%
1981	11,391	+33.3%
1986	11,448	+0.5%

Year	Pop.	±%
1991	11,628	+1.6%
1996	11,640	+0.1%
2001	10,906	−6.3%
2006	10,544	−3.3%
2011	10,227	−3.0%
2016	10,046	−1.8%
2021	9,840	−2.1%

Source: Statistics Canada

== Education ==
Roberval has two primary schools: Notre-Dame et Benoît-Duhamel and a secondary school la Cité Étudiante. There are also two centres for adult training: Ste-Ursules et le Centre de formation professionnelle (CFP).

=== The Ursulines ===
Founded in 1882 by Sister Saint-Raphaël, the Ursuline convent was the first domestic sciences school in Canada. There was also an agricultural school.

Fires in 1897 and 1919 led to rebuilding and improvement of facilities.

Following a fire in 2005, a portion of the convent was replaced by the Jardin des Ursulines, a craft vendors market. In 2011, after 129 years of service to the community, the Ursuline community left Roberval.

== Notable people ==
- Solange Harvey (1930–2008), French-Canadian journalist, columnist and writer.

== See also ==
- Roberval—Lac-Saint-Jean, a Canadian federal electoral district
- Ouiatchouaniche River
- Ouiatchouan River
- List of towns in Quebec

Preceded by North Bay, Ontario	Kraft Hockeyville; 2008	Succeeded by Terrace, British Columbia
