= 40th Quebec Legislature =

- Minority parliament
- Oct. 30, 2012 – Mar. 5, 2014

Parliament leaders
- Premier: Pauline Marois
- Leader of the Opposition: Jean-Marc Fournier; 2012-2013
- Philippe Couillard; 2013-2014

Party caucuses
- Government: Parti Québécois
- Opposition: Liberal
- Recognized: Coalition Avenir Québec
- Unrecognized: Québec solidaire
- Members: 125 MNA seats

Sovereign
- Monarch: Elizabeth II; 6 February 1952 – 8 September 2022
- Lieutenant governor: Pierre Duchesne; 7 June 2007 – 24 September 2015

Sessions
- 1st session October 30, 2012 – March 5, 2014
| ← 39th | → 41st |

The 40th National Assembly of Quebec consisted of those elected in the 2012 general election and two by-elections in December 2013. Pauline Marois (PQ) was the premier. The leader of the opposition changed twice. Jean-Marc Fournier (Liberal) started as leader of the opposition after the resignation of former Liberal Premier Jean Charest who lost his seat in the last provincial election. Philippe Couillard was elected Liberal leader and won election to the assembly in a by-election on December 9, 2013. The assembly was dissolved on March 5, 2014.

== Member list ==
Cabinet ministers are in bold, party leaders are in italic and the president of the National Assembly is marked with a †.

| Name | Party | Riding | First elected / previously elected | No. of terms |
|---|---|---|---|---|
| **Élizabeth Larouche** | Parti Québécois | Abitibi-Est | 2012 | 1st term |
| **François Gendron** | Parti Québécois | Abitibi-Ouest | 1976 | 10th term |
| Christine St-Pierre | Liberal | Acadie | 2007 | 3rd term |
| Lise Thériault | Liberal | Anjou–Louis-Riel | 2002 | 5th term |
| Roland Richer | Parti Québécois | Argenteuil | 2012 | 2nd term |
| Sylvie Roy | CAQ | Arthabaska | 2003 | 4th term |
| André Spénard | CAQ | Beauce-Nord | 2012 | 1st term |
| Robert Dutil | Liberal | Beauce-Sud | 1985, 2008 | 4th term* |
| Guy Leclair | Parti Québécois | Beauharnois | 2008 | 2nd term |
| Dominique Vien | Liberal | Bellechasse | 2003, 2008 | 3rd term* |
| André Villeneuve | Parti Québécois | Berthier | 2008 | 2nd term |
| Claude Cousineau | Parti Québécois | Bertrand | 1998 | 5th term |
| Daniel Ratthé | CAQ (until May 21, 2013) | Blainville | 2008 (Note: First elected as a PQ) | 2nd term |
| Daniel Ratthé | Independent | Blainville | 2008 | 2nd term |
| Sylvain Roy | Parti Québécois | Bonaventure | 2012 | 1st term |
| **Pierre Duchesne** | Parti Québécois | Borduas | 2012 | 1st term |
| Rita de Santis | Liberal | Bourassa-Sauvé | 2012 | 1st term |
| **Maka Kotto** | Parti Québécois | Bourget | 2008 | 3rd term |
| Pierre Paradis | Liberal | Brome-Missisquoi | 1980 | 10th term |
| **Bertrand St-Arnaud** | Parti Québécois | Chambly | 2008 | 2nd term |
| Noëlla Champagne | Parti Québécois | Champlain | 2003, 2008 | 3rd term* |
| Marc Carrière | Liberal | Chapleau | 2008 | 2nd term |
| Denise Trudel | CAQ | Charlesbourg | 2012 | 1st term |
| **Pauline Marois** | Parti Québécois | Charlevoix–Côte-de-Beaupré | 1981, (Note: La Peltrie) 1989, (Note: Taillon) 2007 | 8th term* |
| Pierre Moreau | Liberal | Châteauguay | 2003, (Note: Marguerite-D'Youville) 2008 | 3rd term* |
| Gérard Deltell | CAQ | Chauveau | 2008 | 2nd term |
| **Stéphane Bédard** | Parti Québécois | Chicoutimi | 1998 | 5th term |
| Guy Ouellette | Liberal | Chomedey | 2007 | 3rd term |
| Marc Picard | CAQ | Chutes-de-la-Chaudière | 2003 | 4th term |
| Norbert Morin | Liberal | Côte-du-Sud | 2003, 2008 | 3rd term* |
| **Diane De Courcy** | Parti Québécois | Crémazie | 2012 | 1st term |
| Lawrence Bergman | Liberal | D'Arcy-McGee | 1994 | 6th term |
| Daniel Goyer | Parti Québécois | Deux-Montagnes | 2012 | 1st term |
| Sébastien Schneeberger | CAQ | Drummond–Bois-Francs | 2007, 2012 | 2nd term* |
| Jean-Marie Claveau | Parti Québécois | Dubuc | 2012 | 1st term |
| Lorraine Richard | Parti Québécois | Duplessis | 2003 | 4th term |
| Gilles Ouimet | Liberal | Fabre | 2012 | 1st term |
| **Gaétan Lelièvre** | Parti Québécois | Gaspé | 2012 | 1st term |
| Stéphanie Vallée | Liberal | Gatineau | 2007 | 3rd term |
| Françoise David | Québec solidaire | Gouin | 2012 | 1st term |
| François Bonnardel | CAQ | Granby | 2007 | 3rd term |
| Hélène Daneault | CAQ | Groulx | 2012 | 1st term |
| Carole Poirier | Parti Québécois | Hochelaga-Maisonneuve | 2008 | 2nd term |
| Maryse Gaudreault | Liberal | Hull | 2008 | 3rd term |
| Stéphane Billette | Liberal | Huntingdon | 2008 | 2nd term |
| Marie Bouillé | Parti Québécois | Iberville | 2008 | 2nd term |
| Jeannine Richard | Parti Québécois | Îles-de-la-Madeleine | 2012 | 1st term |
| Geoffrey Kelley | Liberal | Jacques-Cartier | 1994 | 6th term |
| André Drolet | Liberal | Jean-Lesage | 2008 | 2nd term |
| Filomena Rotiroti | Liberal | Jeanne-Mance–Viger | 2008 | 2nd term |
| Yves Bolduc | Liberal | Jean-Talon | 2008 | 3rd term |
| **Yves-François Blanchet** | Parti Québécois | Johnson | 2008 | 2nd term |
| **Véronique Hivon** | Parti Québécois | Joliette | 2008 | 2nd term |
| **Sylvain Gaudreault** | Parti Québécois | Jonquière | 2007 | 3rd term |
| Sylvain Pagé | Parti Québécois | Labelle | 2001 | 5th term |
| **Alexandre Cloutier** | Parti Québécois | Lac-Saint-Jean | 2007 | 3rd term |
| Marc Tanguay | Liberal | LaFontaine | 2012 | 2nd term |
| Éric Caire | CAQ | La Peltrie | 2007 | 3rd term |
| Fatima Houda-Pepin | Liberal | La Pinière | 1994 | 6th term |
| Nicole Ménard | Liberal | Laporte | 2007 | 3rd term |
| Stéphane Le Bouyonnec | CAQ | La Prairie | 2012 | 1st term |
| François Legault | CAQ | L'Assomption | 1998, (Note: Rousseau (First elected as a PQ)) 2012 | 5th term* |
| Gerry Sklavounos | Liberal | Laurier-Dorion | 2007 | 3rd term |
| Léo Bureau-Blouin | Parti Québécois | Laval-des-Rapides | 2012 | 1st term |
| Julie Boulet | Liberal | Laviolette | 2001 | 5th term |
| Christian Dubé | CAQ | Lévis | 2012 | 1st term |
| Laurent Lessard | Liberal | Lotbinière-Frontenac | 2003 | 4th term |
| Sam Hamad | Liberal | Louis-Hébert | 2003 | 4th term |
| Robert Poëti | Liberal | Marguerite-Bourgeoys | 2012 | 1st term |
| **Bernard Drainville** | Parti Québécois | Marie-Victorin | 2007 | 3rd term |
| François Ouimet | Liberal | Marquette | 1994 | 6th term |
| Jean-Paul Diamond | Liberal | Maskinongé | 2008 | 2nd term |
| Diane Hamelin | Parti Québécois | Masson | 2012 | 1st term |
| **Pascal Bérubé** | Parti Québécois | Matane-Matapédia | 2007 | 3rd term |
| Ghislain Bolduc | Liberal | Mégantic | 2012 | 1st term |
| Amir Khadir | Québec solidaire | Mercier | 2008 | 2nd term |
| Francine Charbonneau | Liberal | Mille-Îles | 2008 | 2nd term |
| Denise Beaudoin | Parti Québécois | Mirabel | 2003, 2008 | 3rd term* |
| Nathalie Roy | CAQ | Montarville | 2012 | 1st term |
| Michelyne St-Laurent | CAQ | Montmorency | 2012 | 1st term |
| Pierre Arcand | Liberal | Mont-Royal | 2007 | 3rd term |
| Yolande James | Liberal | Nelligan | 2004 | 4th term |
| Donald Martel | CAQ | Nicolet-Bécancour | 2012 | 1st term |
| Kathleen Weil | Liberal | Notre-Dame-de-Grâce | 2008 | 2nd term |
| Pierre Reid | Liberal | Orford | 2003 | 4th term |
| Raymond Bachand (until August 26, 2013) | Liberal | Outremont | 2005 | 4th term |
| Philippe Couillard (from December 9, 2013) | Liberal | Outremont | 2003, (Note: Mont-Royal) 2013 | 3rd term* |
| Alexandre Iracà | Liberal | Papineau | 2012 | 1st term |
| **Nicole Léger** | Parti Québécois | Pointe-aux-Trembles | 1996, 2008 | 6th term* |
| Charlotte L'Écuyer | Liberal | Pontiac | 2003 | 4th term |
| Jacques Marcotte | CAQ | Portneuf | 2012 | 1st term |
| Marjolain Dufour | Parti Québécois | René-Lévesque | 2003 | 4th term |
| Scott McKay | Parti Québécois | Repentigny | 2008 | 2nd term |
| **Élaine Zakaïb** | Parti Québécois | Richelieu | 2012 | 1st term |
| Karine Vallières | Liberal | Richmond | 2012 | 1st term |
| Irvin Pelletier | Parti Québécois | Rimouski | 2007 | 3rd term |
| Jean D'Amour | Liberal | Rivière-du-Loup–Témiscouata | 2009 | 2nd term |
| Pierre Marsan | Liberal | Robert-Baldwin | 1994 | 6th term |
| Denis Trottier | Parti Québécois | Roberval | 2007 | 3rd term |
| **Jean-François Lisée** | Parti Québécois | Rosemont | 2012 | 1st term |
| **Nicolas Marceau** | Parti Québécois | Rousseau | 2009 | 2nd term |
| Gilles Chapadeau | Parti Québécois | Rouyn-Noranda–Témiscamingue | 2012 | 1st term |
| **Réjean Hébert** | Parti Québécois | Saint-François | 2012 | 1st term |
| Marguerite Blais | Liberal | Saint-Henri–Sainte-Anne | 2007 | 3rd term |
| Émilien Pelletier | Parti Québécois | Saint-Hyacinthe | 2008 | 2nd term |
| Dave Turcotte | Parti Québécois | Saint-Jean | 2008 | 2nd term |
| Jacques Duchesneau | CAQ | Saint-Jérôme | 2012 | 1st term |
| Jean-Marc Fournier | Liberal | Saint-Laurent | 1994, (Note: Châteauguay) 2010 | 6th term* |
| Daniel Breton | Parti Québécois | Sainte-Marie–Saint-Jacques | 2012 | 1st term |
| Luc Trudel | Parti Québécois | Saint-Maurice | 2012 | 1st term |
| Suzanne Proulx | Parti Québécois | Sainte-Rose | 2012 | 1st term |
| Alain Therrien | Parti Québécois | Sanguinet | 2012 | 1st term |
| Serge Cardin | Parti Québécois | Sherbrooke | 2012 | 1st term |
| Lucie Charlebois | Liberal | Soulanges | 2003 | 4th term |
| **Marie Malavoy** | Parti Québécois | Taillon | 1994, (Note: Sherbrooke) 2006 | 5th term* |
| **Agnès Maltais** | Parti Québécois | Taschereau | 1998 | 5th term |
| Mathieu Traversy | Parti Québécois | Terrebonne | 2008 | 2nd term |
| Danielle St-Amand | Liberal | Trois-Rivières | 2008 | 2nd term |
| Luc Ferland | Parti Québécois | Ungava | 2007 | 3rd term |
| **Martine Ouellet** | Parti Québécois | Vachon | 2010 | 2nd term |
| Sylvain Lévesque | CAQ | Vanier-Les Rivières | 2012 | 1st term |
| Yvon Marcoux | Liberal | Vaudreuil | 1998 | 5th term |
| **Stéphane Bergeron** | Parti Québécois | Verchères | 2005 | 4th term |
| Henri-François Gautrin | Liberal | Verdun | 1989 | 7th term |
| Emmanuel Dubourg (until August 9, 2013) | Liberal | Viau | 2007 | 3rd term |
| David Heurtel (from December 9, 2013) | Liberal | Viau | 2013 | 1st term |
| Jean Rousselle | Liberal | Vimont | 2012 | 1st term |
| Jacques Chagnon † | Liberal | Westmount–Saint-Louis | 1985 | 8th term |

== Standings changes during the legislature ==
| Number of members per party by date | 2012 | 2013 | | | | 2014 |
| Number of members per party by date | Sep 4 | May 21 | Aug 9 | Aug 26 | Dec 9 | Jan 20 |
|---|---|---|---|---|---|---|
| Parti Québécois | 54 | | | | | |
| Liberal | 50 | | 49 | 48 | 50 | 49 |
| Coalition Avenir Québec | 19 | 18 | | | | |
| Québec solidaire | 2 | | | | | |
| Independent | 0 | 1 | | | | 2 |
| Total members | 125 | | 124 | 123 | 125 | |
| Vacant | 0 | | 1 | 2 | 0 | |
| Government majority | −17 | | −16 | −15 | −17 | |

Membership changes in the 40th Assembly
| Date | Name | District | Party | Reason |
|---|---|---|---|---|
| September 4, 2012 | See list of members | | | Election day of the 40th Quebec general election |
| May 21, 2013 | Daniel Ratthé | Blainville | Independent | Suspended from CAQ caucus |
| August 9, 2013 | Emmanuel Dubourg | Viau | Liberal | Resigned seat |
| August 26, 2013 | Raymond Bachand | Outremont | Liberal | Resigned seat |
| December 18, 2013 | Philippe Couillard | Outremont | Liberal | Elected in a by-election |
| December 18, 2013 | David Heurtel | Viau | Liberal | Elected in a by-election |
| January 20, 2014 | Fatima Houda-Pepin | La Pinière | Independent | Left Liberal caucus to sit as Independent. |
