= 39th Quebec Legislature =

The 39th National Assembly of Quebec consisted of those elected in the 2008 Quebec general election. It was in session from January 13, 2009 to February 22, 2011 and from February 23, 2011 to August 1, 2012. Jean Charest (Liberal) served as Premier and Pauline Marois (PQ) was the leader of the opposition.

== Member list ==
Cabinet ministers are in bold, party leaders are in italic, and the president of the National Assembly is marked with a †.

Name	Party	Riding	First elected / previously elected	No. of terms
**Pierre Corbeil**	Liberal	Abitibi-Est	2003, 2008	2nd term*
François Gendron	Parti Québécois	Abitibi-Ouest	1976	9th term
**Christine St-Pierre**	Liberal	Acadie	2007	2nd term
**Lise Thériault**	Liberal	Anjou	2002	4th term
David Whissell (until December 16, 2011)	Liberal	Argenteuil	1998	5th term
Roland Richer (after June 11, 2012)	Parti Québécois	Argenteuil	2012	1st term
Claude Bachand	Liberal	Arthabaska	2003, 2008	2nd term*
Janvier Grondin	ADQ	Beauce-Nord	2003	3rd term
Janvier Grondin	CAQ	Beauce-Nord	2003	3rd term
**Robert Dutil**	Liberal	Beauce-Sud	1985, 2008	3rd term*
Guy Leclair	Parti Québécois	Beauharnois	2008	1st term
**Dominique Vien**	Liberal	Bellechasse	2003, 2008	2nd term*
André Villeneuve	Parti Québécois	Berthier	2008	1st term
Claude Cousineau	Parti Québécois	Bertrand	1998	4th term
Daniel Ratthé	Parti Québécois	Blainville	2008	1st term
Daniel Ratthé	Independent	Blainville	2008	1st term
Daniel Ratthé	CAQ	Blainville	2008	1st term
Nathalie Normandeau (until September 6, 2011)	Liberal	Bonaventure	1998	4th term
Damien Arsenault (after December 5, 2011)	Liberal	Bonaventure	2011	1st term
Pierre Curzi	Parti Québécois	Borduas	2007	2nd term
Pierre Curzi	Independent	Borduas	2007	2nd term
**Line Beauchamp** (until May 14, 2012)	Liberal	Bourassa-Sauvé	1998	4th term
Vacant		Bourassa-Sauvé	1998	4th term
Maka Kotto	Parti Québécois	Bourget	2008	2nd term
Pierre Paradis	Liberal	Brome-Missisquoi	1980	9th term
Bertrand St-Arnaud	Parti Québécois	Chambly	2008	1st term
Noëlla Champagne	Parti Québécois	Champlain	2003, 2008	2nd term*
Marc Carrière	Liberal	Chapleau	2008	1st term
Michel Pigeon	Liberal	Charlesbourg	2008	1st term
Pauline Marois	Parti Québécois	Charlevoix	1981, (Note: La Peltrie) 1989, (Note: Taillon) 2007	7th term*
Pierre Moreau	Liberal	Châteauguay	2003, (Note: Marguerite-D'Youville) 2008	2nd term*
Gérard Deltell	ADQ	Chauveau	2008	1st term
Gérard Deltell	CAQ	Chauveau	2008	1st term
Stéphane Bédard	Parti Québécois	Chicoutimi	1998	4th term
Guy Ouellette	Liberal	Chomedey	2007	2nd term
Marc Picard	ADQ	Chutes-de-la-Chaudière	2003	3rd term
Marc Picard	Independent	Chutes-de-la-Chaudière	2003	3rd term
Marc Picard	CAQ	Chutes-de-la-Chaudière	2003	3rd term
Lisette Lapointe	Parti Québécois	Crémazie	2007	2nd term
Lisette Lapointe	Independent	Crémazie	2007	2nd term
Lisette Lapointe	Independent Option nationale	Crémazie	2007	2nd term
Lawrence Bergman	Liberal	D'Arcy-McGee	1994	5th term
Benoit Charette	Parti Québécois	Deux-Montagnes	2008	1st term
Benoit Charette	Independent	Deux-Montagnes	2008	1st term
Benoit Charette	CAQ	Deux-Montagnes	2008	1st term
Yves-François Blanchet	Parti Québécois	Drummond	2008	1st term
**Serge Simard**	Liberal	Dubuc	2008	1st term
Lorraine Richard	Parti Québécois	Duplessis	2003	3rd term
**Michelle Courchesne**	Liberal	Fabre	2003	3rd term
**Laurent Lessard**	Liberal	Frontenac	2003	3rd term
Georges Mamelonet	Liberal	Gaspé	2008	1st term
Stéphanie Vallée	Liberal	Gatineau	2007	2nd term
Nicolas Girard	Parti Québécois	Gouin	2004	3rd term
René Gauvreau	Parti Québécois	Groulx	2008	1st term
René Gauvreau	Independent	Groulx	2008	1st term
René Gauvreau	Parti Québécois	Groulx	2008	1st term
Carole Poirier	Parti Québécois	Hochelaga-Maisonneuve	2008	1st term
Maryse Gaudreault	Liberal	Hull	2008	2nd term
Stéphane Billette	Liberal	Huntingdon	2008	1st term
Marie Bouillé	Parti Québécois	Iberville	2008	1st term
Germain Chevarie	Liberal	Îles-de-la-Madeleine	2008	1st term
Geoffrey Kelley	Liberal	Jacques-Cartier	1994	5th term
André Drolet	Liberal	Jean-Lesage	2008	1st term
Filomena Rotiroti	Liberal	Jeanne-Mance–Viger	2008	1st term
**Yves Bolduc**	Liberal	Jean-Talon	2008	2nd term
Étienne-Alexis Boucher	Parti Québécois	Johnson	2008	1st term
Véronique Hivon	Parti Québécois	Joliette	2008	1st term
Sylvain Gaudreault	Parti Québécois	Jonquière	2007	2nd term
Claude Béchard (until September 7, 2010)	Liberal	Kamouraska-Témiscouata	1997	5th term
André Simard (after November 29, 2010)	Parti Québécois	Kamouraska-Témiscouata	2010	1st term
Sylvain Pagé	Parti Québécois	Labelle	2001	4th term
Alexandre Cloutier	Parti Québécois	Lac-Saint-Jean	2007	2nd term
Tony Tomassi (until May 3, 2012)	Liberal	LaFontaine	2003	3rd term
Tony Tomassi (until May 3, 2012)	Independent	LaFontaine	2003	3rd term
Marc Tanguay (after June 11, 2012)	Liberal	LaFontaine	2012	1st term
Éric Caire	ADQ	La Peltrie	2007	2nd term
Éric Caire	Independent	La Peltrie	2007	2nd term
Éric Caire	CAQ	La Peltrie	2007	2nd term
Fatima Houda-Pepin	Liberal	La Pinière	1994	5th term
**Nicole Ménard**	Liberal	Laporte	2007	2nd term
François Rebello	Parti Québécois	La Prairie	2008	1st term
François Rebello	CAQ	La Prairie	2008	1st term
Scott McKay	Parti Québécois	L'Assomption	2008	1st term
Gerry Sklavounos	Liberal	Laurier-Dorion	2007	2nd term
Alain Paquet	Liberal	Laval-des-Rapides	2003	3rd term
**Julie Boulet**	Liberal	Laviolette	2001	4th term
Gilles Lehouillier	Liberal	Lévis	2008	1st term
Sylvie Roy	ADQ	Lotbinière	2003	3rd term
Sylvie Roy	CAQ	Lotbinière	2003	3rd term
**Sam Hamad**	Liberal	Louis-Hébert	2003	3rd term
Monique Jérôme-Forget (until April 8, 2009)	Liberal	Marguerite-Bourgeoys	1998	4th term
**Clément Gignac** (after June 22, 2009)	Liberal	Marguerite-Bourgeoys	2009	1st term
Monique Richard	Parti Québécois	Marguerite-D'Youville	2008	1st term
Bernard Drainville	Parti Québécois	Marie-Victorin	2007	2nd term
François Ouimet	Liberal	Marquette	1994	5th term
Jean-Paul Diamond	Liberal	Maskinongé	2008	1st term
Guillaume Tremblay	Parti Québécois	Masson	2008	1st term
Pascal Bérubé	Parti Québécois	Matane	2007	2nd term
Danielle Doyer	Parti Québécois	Matapédia	1994	5th term
Johanne Gonthier	Liberal	Mégantic-Compton	2007	2nd term
Amir Khadir	Québec solidaire	Mercier	2008	1st term
Francine Charbonneau	Liberal	Mille-Îles	2008	1st term
Denise Beaudoin	Parti Québécois	Mirabel	2003, 2008	2nd term*
Norbert Morin	Liberal	Montmagny-L'Islet	2003, 2008	2nd term*
Raymond Bernier	Liberal	Montmorency	2003, 2008	2nd term*
**Pierre Arcand**	Liberal	Mont-Royal	2007	2nd term
**Yolande James**	Liberal	Nelligan	2004	3rd term
Jean-Martin Aussant	Parti Québécois	Nicolet-Yamaska	2008	1st term
Jean-Martin Aussant	Independent	Nicolet-Yamaska	2008	1st term
Jean-Martin Aussant	Option nationale	Nicolet-Yamaska	2008	1st term
**Kathleen Weil**	Liberal	Notre-Dame-de-Grâce	2008	1st term
Pierre Reid	Liberal	Orford	2003	3rd term
**Raymond Bachand**	Liberal	Outremont	2005	3rd term
**Norman MacMillan**	Liberal	Papineau	1989	6th term
Nicole Léger	Parti Québécois	Pointe-aux-Trembles	1996, 2008	5th term*
Charlotte L'Écuyer	Liberal	Pontiac	2003	3rd term
Michel Matte	Liberal	Portneuf	2008	1st term
Gilles Robert	Parti Québécois	Prévost	2008	1st term
Marjolain Dufour	Parti Québécois	René-Lévesque	2003	3rd term
Sylvain Simard	Parti Québécois	Richelieu	1994	5th term
Yvon Vallières	Liberal	Richmond	1973, 1981	9th term*
Irvin Pelletier	Parti Québécois	Rimouski	2007	2nd term
Mario Dumont (until March 6, 2009)	ADQ	Rivière-du-Loup	1994	5th term
Jean D'Amour (after June 22, 2009)	Liberal	Rivière-du-Loup	2009	1st term
Jean D'Amour (after June 22, 2009)	Independent	Rivière-du-Loup	2009	1st term
Jean D'Amour (after June 22, 2009)	Liberal	Rivière-du-Loup	2009	1st term
Pierre Marsan	Liberal	Robert-Baldwin	1994	5th term
Denis Trottier	Parti Québécois	Roberval	2007	2nd term
Louise Beaudoin	Parti Québécois	Rosemont	1994, (Note: Chambly) 2008	3rd term*
Louise Beaudoin	Independent	Rosemont	1994, 2008	3rd term*
Louise Beaudoin	Parti Québécois	Rosemont	1994, 2008	3rd term*
François Legault (until June 25, 2009)	Parti Québécois	Rousseau	1998	4th term
Nicolas Marceau (after September 21, 2009)	Parti Québécois	Rousseau	2009	1st term
Daniel Bernard	Liberal	Rouyn-Noranda–Témiscamingue	2003, 2008	2nd term*
**Monique Gagnon-Tremblay**	Liberal	Saint-François	1985	7th term
**Marguerite Blais**	Liberal	Saint-Henri–Sainte-Anne	2007	2nd term
Émilien Pelletier	Parti Québécois	Saint-Hyacinthe	2008	1st term
Dave Turcotte	Parti Québécois	Saint-Jean	2008	1st term
Jacques Dupuis (until August 9, 2010)	Liberal	Saint-Laurent	1998	4th term
**Jean-Marc Fournier** (after September 13, 2010)	Liberal	Saint-Laurent	1994, (Note: Châteauguay) 2010	5th term*
Martin Lemay	Parti Québécois	Sainte-Marie–Saint-Jacques	2006	3rd term
Claude Pinard	Parti Québécois	Saint-Maurice	1994, 2008	4th term*
François Bonnardel	ADQ	Shefford	2007	2nd term
François Bonnardel	CAQ	Shefford	2007	2nd term
**Jean Charest**	Liberal	Sherbrooke	1998	4th term
Lucie Charlebois	Liberal	Soulanges	2003	3rd term
Marie Malavoy	Parti Québécois	Taillon	1994, (Note: Sherbrooke) 2006	4th term*
Agnès Maltais	Parti Québécois	Taschereau	1998	4th term
Mathieu Traversy	Parti Québécois	Terrebonne	2008	1st term
Danielle St-Amand	Liberal	Trois-Rivières	2008	1st term
Luc Ferland	Parti Québécois	Ungava	2007	2nd term
Camil Bouchard (until January 6, 2010)	Parti Québécois	Vachon	2003	3rd term
Martine Ouellet (after July 5, 2010)	Parti Québécois	Vachon	2010	1st term
Patrick Huot	Liberal	Vanier	2008	1st term
Yvon Marcoux	Liberal	Vaudreuil	1998	4th term
Stéphane Bergeron	Parti Québécois	Verchères	2005	3rd term
Henri-François Gautrin	Liberal	Verdun	1989	6th term
Emmanuel Dubourg	Liberal	Viau	2007	2nd term
Vincent Auclair	Liberal	Vimont	2003	3rd term
Jacques Chagnon †	Liberal	Westmount–Saint-Louis	1985	7th term

== Standings changes since the 39th general election ==
Number of members per party by date	2008	2009								2010							2011													2012						
Number of members per party by date	Dec 8	Mar 6	Apr 8	Jun 22	Jun 25	Sep 21	Nov 6	Nov 10	Dec 24	Jan 6	May 5	Jul 5	Aug 9	Sep 7	Sep 13	Nov 29	Jun 6	Jun 7	Jun 20	Jun 21	Sep 6	Oct 31	Nov 17	Nov 23	Nov 24	Nov 29	Dec 5	Dec 16	Dec 19	Jan 9	Jan 22	Apr 3	Apr 5	May 3	May 14	June 11
Liberal	66		65	67				66	67		66		65	64	65						64						65	64							63	64
Parti Québécois	51				50	51				50		51				52	49	48	47	46				45	44	45				44		45	46			47
Coalition Avenir Québec	0																												4	5	9					
Independent	0						2	3	2		3						6	7	8	9		8	7	8	9	8			4			3	2	1		
Québec solidaire	1																																			
Option nationale	0																					1														
Independent Option nationale	0																						1													
Action démocratique	7	6					4																								0					
Total members	125	124	123	125	124	125				124		125	124	123	124	125					124						125	124						123	122	124
Vacant	0	1	2	0	1	0				1		0	1	2	1	0					1						0	1						2	3	1
Government Majority	7	8	7	9	10	9		7	9	10	8	7	6	5	6	5					4						5	4						5	4	

Membership changes in the 39th Assembly
Date	Name	District	Party	Reason
December 8, 2008	See List of Members			Election day of the 39th general election
March 6, 2009	Mario Dumont	Rivière-du-Loup	ADQ	Resigned seat
April 8, 2009	Monique Jérôme-Forget	Marguerite-Bourgeoys	Liberal	Resigned seat
June 22, 2009	Jean D'Amour	Rivière-du-Loup	Liberal	Elected in a by-election
June 22, 2009	Clément Gignac	Marguerite-Bourgeoys	Liberal	Elected in a by-election
June 25, 2009	François Legault	Rousseau	Parti Québécois	Resigned seat
September 21, 2009	Nicolas Marceau	Rousseau	Parti Québécois	Elected in a by-election
November 6, 2009	Éric Caire	La Peltrie	Independent	Left ADQ caucus to sit as an Independent
November 6, 2009	Marc Picard	Chutes-de-la-Chaudière	Independent	Left ADQ caucus to sit as an Independent
November 10, 2009	Jean D'Amour	Rivière-du-Loup	Independent	Left Liberal caucus due to criminal investigation
December 24, 2009	Jean D'Amour	Rivière-du-Loup	Liberal	Reinstated in the Liberal caucus
January 6, 2010	Camil Bouchard	Vachon	Parti Québécois	Resigned seat
May 5, 2010	Tony Tomassi	LaFontaine	Independent	Left the Liberal caucus
July 5, 2010	Martine Ouellet	Vachon	Parti Québécois	Elected in a by-election
August 9, 2010	Jacques Dupuis	Saint-Laurent	Liberal	Resigned seat
September 7, 2010	Claude Béchard	Kamouraska-Témiscouata	Liberal	Resigned seat (and died the same day)
September 13, 2010	Jean-Marc Fournier	Saint-Laurent	Liberal	Elected in a by-election
November 29, 2010	André Simard	Kamouraska-Témiscouata	Parti Québécois	Elected in a by-election
June 6, 2011	Louise Beaudoin	Rosemont	Independent	Left PQ caucus to sit as an Independent
June 6, 2011	Lisette Lapointe	Crémazie	Independent	Left PQ caucus to sit as an Independent
June 6, 2011	Pierre Curzi	Borduas	Independent	Left PQ caucus to sit as an Independent
June 7, 2011	Jean-Martin Aussant	Nicolet-Yamaska	Independent	Left PQ caucus to sit as an Independent
June 20, 2011	Benoit Charette	Deux-Montagnes	Independent	Left PQ caucus to sit as an Independent
June 21, 2011	René Gauvreau	Groulx	Independent	Left PQ caucus to sit as an Independent
September 6, 2011	Nathalie Normandeau	Bonaventure	Liberal	Resigned seat
October 31, 2011	Jean-Martin Aussant	Nicolet-Yamaska	Option nationale	Registered new political party
November 17, 2011	Lisette Lapointe	Crémazie	Independent Option nationale	Bought an Option nationale membership
November 23, 2011	Guy Leclair	Beauharnois	Independent	Expelled from PQ caucus
November 24, 2011	Daniel Ratthé	Blainville	Independent	Expelled from PQ caucus
November 29, 2011	Guy Leclair	Beauharnois	Parti Québécois	Re-joined PQ caucus
December 5, 2011	Damien Arsenault	Bonaventure	Liberal	Elected in a by-election
December 16, 2011	David Whissell	Argenteuil	Liberal	Resigned seat
December 19, 2011	Éric Caire	La Peltrie	CAQ	Joined CAQ caucus
December 19, 2011	Benoit Charette	Deux-Montagnes	CAQ	Joined CAQ caucus
December 19, 2011	Marc Picard	Chutes-de-la-Chaudière	CAQ	Joined CAQ caucus
December 19, 2011	Daniel Ratthé	Blainville	CAQ	Joined CAQ caucus
January 9, 2012	François Rebello	La Prairie	CAQ	Left PQ caucus and joined CAQ caucus
January 22, 2012	Sylvie Roy	Lotbinière	CAQ	ADQ membership voted to merge with CAQ
January 22, 2012	Janvier Grondin	Beauce-Nord	CAQ	ADQ membership voted to merge with CAQ
January 22, 2012	François Bonnardel	Shefford	CAQ	ADQ membership voted to merge with CAQ
January 22, 2012	Gérard Deltell	Chauveau	CAQ	ADQ membership voted to merge with CAQ
April 3, 2012	Louise Beaudoin	Rosemont	Parti Québécois	Rejoined PQ caucus
April 5, 2012	René Gauvreau	Groulx	Parti Québécois	Re-admitted into PQ caucus
May 3, 2012	Tony Tomassi	LaFontaine	Independent	Resigned seat
May 14, 2012	Line Beauchamp	Bourassa-Sauvé	Liberal	Vacated seat and cabinet posts
June 11, 2012	Roland Richer	Argenteuil	Parti Québécois	By-election
June 11, 2012	Marc Tanguay	LaFontaine	Liberal	By-election

== Cabinet Ministers ==
- Premier and Executive Council President: Jean Charest
- Deputy Premier: Nathalie Normandeau (2008–2011), Line Beauchamp (2011–2012), Michelle Courchesne (2012-)
- House Leader: Jacques Dupuis (2008–2010), Jean-Marc Fournier (2010–)
- Deputy House Leader: Line Beauchamp (2008–2009), Robert Dutil (2010–)
- Agriculture, Fisheries and Food: Laurent Lessard (2008–2009), Claude Béchard (2009–2010), Laurent Lessard (2010–2011), Pierre Corbeil (2011–)
- Employment and Social Solidarity: Sam Hamad (2008–2010), Julie Boulet (2010–)
- Labour: David Whissell (2008–2009), Lise Thériault (2009–)
- Government Administration and President of the Treasury Board: Monique Gagnon-Tremblay (2008–2010), Michelle Courchesne (2010–)
- Government Services: Dominique Vien (2008–2010), Michelle Courchesne (2010–)
- Culture, Communications and Status of Women: Christine St-Pierre
- International Relations: Pierre Arcand (2008–2010), Monique Gagnon-Tremblay (2010–)
- Indian Affairs: Pierre Corbeil (2008–2011), Geoffrey Kelley (2011–)
- Canadian Francophonie: Pierre Arcand (2008–2010), Nathalie Normandeau (2010–2011), Yvon Vallières (2011–)
- Health and Social Services: Yves Bolduc
- Delegate Minister to Social Services: Lise Thériault (2008–2010), Dominique Vien (2010–)
- Education, Recreation and Sports: Michelle Courchesne (2008–2010), Line Beauchamp (2010–2012), Michelle Courchesne (2012-)
- Immigration and Cultural Communities: Yolande James (2008–2010), Kathleen Weil (2010–)
- Seniors: Marguerite Blais
- Families: Tony Tomassi (2008–2010), Yolande James (2010–)
- Transportation: Julie Boulet (2008–2010), Sam Hamad (2010–2011), Pierre Moreau (2011–)
- Delegate Minister of Transportation: Norman MacMillan
- Infrastructures: Monique Jérôme-Forget (2008–2009), Monique Gagnon-Tremblay (2009–)
- Canadian Intergovernmental Affairs: Jacques Dupuis (2008–2009), Claude Béchard (2009–2010), Nathalie Normandeau (2010–2011), Yvon Vallières (2011–)
- Municipal Affairs, Regions and Land Occupancy: Nathalie Normandeau (2008–2009), Laurent Lessard (2009–)
- Democratic Institutions Reform and Access to Information: Jacques Dupuis (2008–2010), Jean-Marc Fournier (2010–2011), Yvon Vallières (2011–)
- Sustainable Development, Environment and Parks: Line Beauchamp (2008–2010), Pierre Arcand (2010–)
- Natural Resources and Wildlife: Claude Béchard (2008–2009), Nathalie Normandeau (2009–2011), Clément Gignac (2011–)
- Delegate Minister to Natural Resources and Wildlife: Serge Simard
- Justice: Kathleen Weil (2008–2010), Jean-Marc Fournier (2010–)
- Public Security: Jacques Dupuis (2008–2010), Robert Dutil (2010–)
- Finance: Monique Jérôme-Forget (2008–2009), Raymond Bachand (2009–)
- Revenue: Robert Dutil (2008–2010), Raymond Bachand (2010–)
- Tourism: Nicole Ménard
- Economic Development, Innovation and Export Trade: Raymond Bachand (2008–2009), Clément Gignac (2009–2011), Sam Hamad (2011–)

== New electoral districts ==
An electoral map reform was made in 2011 and went into effect for the 2012 election.

The following electoral districts were created:

- Charlevoix–Côte-de-Beaupré
- Côte-du-Sud
- Drummond–Bois-Francs
- Granby
- Lotbinière-Frontenac
- Matane-Matapédia
- Mégantic
- Montarville
- Nicolet-Bécancour
- Repentigny
- Rivière-du-Loup–Témiscouata
- Sainte-Rose
- Saint-Jérôme
- Sanguinet
- Vanier-Les Rivières

The following electoral districts disappeared:

- Charlevoix
- Drummond
- Frontenac
- Kamouraska-Témiscouata
- Lotbinière
- Marguerite-D'Youville
- Matane
- Matapédia
- Mégantic-Compton
- Montmagny-L'Islet
- Nicolet-Yamaska
- Prévost
- Rivière-du-Loup
- Shefford
- Vanier

The following electoral district was renamed:

- Anjou was renamed Anjou–Louis-Riel; its territory was unchanged.
