= 38th Quebec Legislature =

The 38th National Assembly of Quebec was elected in the 2007 Quebec general election and sat from May 8, 2007 to November 5, 2008. Jean Charest (PLQ) was the Premier and Mario Dumont (ADQ) was the leader of the opposition. It ended when the 2008 general election was called.

== Member list ==
Cabinet Ministers are in Bold, Leaders are in Italics and the President of the National Assembly has a Dagger next to his name.

Name	Party	Riding	First elected / previously elected	No. of terms
Alexis Wawanoloath	Parti Québécois	Abitibi-Est	2007	1st term
François Gendron	Parti Québécois	Abitibi-Ouest	1976	8th term
**Christine St-Pierre**	Libéral	Acadie	2007	1st term
Lise Thériault	Libéral	Anjou	2002	3rd term
**David Whissell**	Libéral	Argenteuil	1998	4th term
Jean-François Roux	ADQ	Arthabaska	2007	1st term
Janvier Grondin	ADQ	Beauce-Nord	2003	2nd term
Claude Morin	ADQ	Beauce-Sud	2007	1st term
Serge Deslières	Parti Québécois	Beauharnois	1994	4th term
Jean Domingue	ADQ	Bellechasse	2007	1st term
François Benjamin	ADQ	Berthier	2007	1st term
Claude Cousineau	Parti Québécois	Bertrand	1998	3rd term
Pierre Gingras	ADQ	Blainville	2007	1st term
**Nathalie Normandeau**	Libéral	Bonaventure	1998	3rd term
Pierre Curzi	Parti Québécois	Borduas	2007	1st term
**Line Beauchamp**	Libéral	Bourassa-Sauvé	1998	3rd term
Diane Lemieux (until October 17, 2007) (Note: replaced as House Leader by François Gendron.)	Parti Québécois	Bourget	1998	3rd term
Maka Kotto (after May 12, 2008)	Parti Québécois	Bourget	2008	1st term
Pierre Paradis	Libéral	Brome-Missisquoi	1980	8th term
Richard Merlini	ADQ	Chambly	2007	1st term
Pierre-Michel Auger	ADQ	Champlain	2007	1st term
Pierre-Michel Auger	Libéral (Note: Crossed the floor from the ADQ to the Liberals on October 23, 2008.)	Champlain	2007	1st term
**Benoît Pelletier**	Libéral	Chapleau	1998	3rd term
Catherine Morissette	ADQ	Charlesbourg	2007	1st term
Rosaire Bertrand (until August 13, 2007) (Note: resigned on August 13, 2007, to make way for a by-election later that year in which the new Parti Québécois leader, Pauline Marois, would be a candidate.)	Parti Québécois	Charlevoix	1994	4th term
Pauline Marois (after September 24, 2007)	Parti Québécois	Charlevoix	1981, (Note: La Peltrie) 1989, (Note: Taillon) 2007	6th term*
**Jean-Marc Fournier**	Libéral	Châteauguay	1994	4th term
Gilles Taillon	ADQ	Chauveau	2007	1st term
Stéphane Bédard	Parti Québécois	Chicoutimi	1998	3rd term
Guy Ouellette	Libéral	Chomedey	2007	1st term
Marc Picard	ADQ	Chutes-de-la-Chaudière	2003	2nd term
Lisette Lapointe	Parti Québécois	Crémazie	2007	1st term
Lawrence Bergman	Libéral	D'Arcy-McGee	1994	4th term
Lucie Leblanc	ADQ	Deux-Montagnes	2007	1st term
Sébastien Schneeberger	ADQ	Drummond	2007	1st term
Jacques Côté	Parti Québécois	Dubuc	1998	3rd term
Lorraine Richard	Parti Québécois	Duplessis	2003	2nd term
**Michelle Courchesne**	Libéral	Fabre	2003	2nd term
**Laurent Lessard**	Libéral	Frontenac	2003	2nd term
Guy Lelièvre	Parti Québécois	Gaspé	1994	4th term
Stéphanie Vallée	Libéral	Gatineau	2007	1st term
Nicolas Girard	Parti Québécois	Gouin	2004	2nd term
Linda Lapointe	ADQ	Groulx	2007	1st term
Louise Harel	Parti Québécois	Hochelaga-Maisonneuve	1981	7th term
Roch Cholette (until April 9, 2008)	Libéral	Hull	1998	3rd term
Maryse Gaudreault (after May 12, 2008)	Libéral	Hull	2008	1st term
Albert De Martin	ADQ	Huntingdon	2007	1st term
André Riedl	ADQ	Iberville	2007	1st term
André Riedl	Libéral	Iberville	2007	1st term
Maxime Arseneau	Parti Québécois	Îles-de-la-Madeleine	1998	3rd term
Geoffrey Kelley	Libéral	Jacques-Cartier	1994	4th term
Jean-François Gosselin	ADQ	Jean-Lesage	2007	1st term
Michel Bissonnet (until July 14, 2008)	Libéral	Jeanne-Mance–Viger	1981	7th term
vacant		Jeanne-Mance–Viger	1981	7th term
Philippe Couillard (until June 25, 2008)	Libéral	Jean-Talon	2003	2nd term
**Yves Bolduc** (after September 29, 2008) (Note: won the Jean-Talon by-election on September 29, 2008 with 58% of the popular vote.)	Libéral	Jean-Talon	2008	1st term
Éric Charbonneau	ADQ	Johnson	2007	1st term
Pascal Beaupré	ADQ	Joliette	2007	1st term
Sylvain Gaudreault	Parti Québécois	Jonquière	2007	1st term
**Claude Béchard**	Libéral	Kamouraska-Témiscouata	1997	4th term
Sylvain Pagé	Parti Québécois	Labelle	2001	3rd term
Alexandre Cloutier	Parti Québécois	Lac-Saint-Jean	2007	1st term
Tony Tomassi	Libéral	LaFontaine	2003	2nd term
Éric Caire	ADQ	La Peltrie	2007	1st term
Fatima Houda-Pepin	Libéral	La Pinière	1994	4th term
Nicole Ménard	Libéral	Laporte	2007	1st term
Monique Roy Verville	ADQ	La Prairie	2007	1st term
Éric Laporte	ADQ	L'Assomption	2007	1st term
Gerry Sklavounos	Libéral	Laurier-Dorion	2007	1st term
Alain Paquet	Libéral	Laval-des-Rapides	2003	2nd term
**Julie Boulet**	Libéral	Laviolette	2001	3rd term
Christian Lévesque	ADQ	Lévis	2007	1st term
Sylvie Roy	ADQ	Lotbinière	2003	2nd term
**Sam Hamad**	Libéral	Louis-Hébert	2003	2nd term
**Monique Jérôme-Forget**	Libéral	Marguerite-Bourgeoys	1998	3rd term
Simon-Pierre Diamond	ADQ	Marguerite-D'Youville	2007	1st term
Bernard Drainville	Parti Québécois	Marie-Victorin	2007	1st term
François Ouimet	Libéral	Marquette	1994	4th term
Jean Damphousse	ADQ	Maskinongé	2007	1st term
Ginette Grandmont	ADQ	Masson	2007	1st term
Pascal Bérubé	Parti Québécois	Matane	2007	1st term
Danielle Doyer	Parti Québécois	Matapédia	1994	4th term
Johanne Gonthier	Libéral	Mégantic-Compton	2007	1st term
Daniel Turp	Parti Québécois	Mercier	2003	2nd term
Maurice Clermont	Libéral	Mille-Îles	2003	2nd term
François Desrochers	ADQ	Mirabel	2007	1st term
Claude Roy	ADQ	Montmagny-L'Islet	2007	1st term
Hubert Benoit	ADQ	Montmorency	2007	1st term
Pierre Arcand	Libéral	Mont-Royal	2007	1st term
**Yolande James**	Libéral	Nelligan	2004	2nd term
Éric Dorion	ADQ	Nicolet-Yamaska	2007	1st term
Russell Copeman (until October 22, 2008)	Libéral	Notre-Dame-de-Grâce	1994	4th term
vacant		Notre-Dame-de-Grâce	1994	4th term
Pierre Reid	Libéral	Orford	2003	2nd term
**Raymond Bachand**	Libéral	Outremont	2005	2nd term
Norman MacMillan	Libéral	Papineau	1989	5th term
André Boisclair (until November 15, 2007)	Parti Québécois	Pointe-aux-Trembles	1989, (Note: Gouin) 2006	6th term*
Nicole Léger (after May 12, 2008)	Parti Québécois	Pointe-aux-Trembles	1996, 2008	4th term*
Charlotte L'Écuyer	Libéral	Pontiac	2003	2nd term
Raymond Francoeur	ADQ	Portneuf	2007	1st term
Martin Camirand	ADQ	Prévost	2007	1st term
Marjolain Dufour	Parti Québécois	René-Lévesque	2003	2nd term
Sylvain Simard	Parti Québécois	Richelieu	1994	4th term
Yvon Vallières	Libéral	Richmond	1973, 1981	8th term*
Irvin Pelletier	Parti Québécois	Rimouski	2007	1st term
Mario Dumont	ADQ	Rivière-du-Loup	1994	4th term
Pierre Marsan	Libéral	Robert-Baldwin	1994	4th term
Denis Trottier	Parti Québécois	Roberval	2007	1st term
Rita Dionne-Marsolais	Parti Québécois	Rosemont	1994	4th term
François Legault	Parti Québécois	Rousseau	1998	3rd term
Johanne Morasse	Parti Québécois	Rouyn-Noranda–Témiscamingue	2007	1st term
**Monique Gagnon-Tremblay**	Libéral	Saint-François	1985	6th term
**Marguerite Blais**	Libéral	Saint-Henri–Sainte-Anne	2007	1st term
Claude L'Écuyer	ADQ	Saint-Hyacinthe	2007	1st term
Lucille Méthé	ADQ	Saint-Jean	2007	1st term
**Jacques Dupuis**	Libéral	Saint-Laurent	1998	3rd term
Martin Lemay	Parti Québécois	Sainte-Marie–Saint-Jacques	2006	2nd term
Robert Deschamps	ADQ	Saint-Maurice	2007	1st term
François Bonnardel	ADQ	Shefford	2007	1st term
**Jean Charest**	Libéral	Sherbrooke	1998	3rd term
Lucie Charlebois	Libéral	Soulanges	2003	2nd term
Marie Malavoy	Parti Québécois	Taillon	1994, (Note: Sherbrooke) 2006	3rd term*
Agnès Maltais	Parti Québécois	Taschereau	1998	3rd term
Jean-François Therrien	ADQ	Terrebonne	2007	1st term
Sébastien Proulx	ADQ	Trois-Rivières	2007	1st term
Luc Ferland	Parti Québécois	Ungava	2007	1st term
Camil Bouchard	Parti Québécois	Vachon	2003	2nd term
Sylvain Légaré	ADQ	Vanier	2004	2nd term
Yvon Marcoux	Libéral	Vaudreuil	1998	3rd term
Stéphane Bergeron	Parti Québécois	Verchères	2005	2nd term
Henri-François Gautrin	Libéral	Verdun	1989	5th term
Emmanuel Dubourg	Libéral	Viau	2007	1st term
Vincent Auclair	Libéral	Vimont	2003	2nd term
Jacques Chagnon	Libéral	Westmount–Saint-Louis	1985	6th term

== Cabinet Ministers ==
- Premier and Executive Council President: Jean Charest
- Deputy Premier: Nathalie Normandeau
- Agriculture, Fisheries and Food: Laurent Lessard
- Employment and Social Solidarity: Sam Hamad
- Labor: David Whissell
- Government Administration, Government Services and President of the Treasury Board: Monique Jérôme-Forget
- Information Access:Benoît Pelletier
- Culture, Communications and Status of Women: Christine St-Pierre
- International Relations: Monique Gagnon-Tremblay
- Indian Affairs: Benoît Pelletier
- Canadian Francophonie: Benoît Pelletier
- Health and Social Services: Philippe Couillard (2007-2008), Yves Bolduc (2008–present)
- Education: Michelle Courchesne
- Immigration and Cultural Communities: Yolande James
- Seniors: Marguerite Blais
- Family: Michelle Courchesne
- Transportation: Julie Boulet
- Canadian Intergovernmental Affairs: Benoît Pelletier
- Municipal Affairs and Regions: Nathalie Normandeau
- Democratic Institutions Reform: Benoît Pelletier
- Recreation and Sport: Michelle Courchesne
- Sustainable Development, Environment and Parks: Line Beauchamp
- Natural Resources and Wildlife: Claude Bechard
- Justice: Jacques P. Dupuis
- Public Safety: Jacques P. Dupuis
- Finances: Monique Jerome-Forget
- Revenue: Jean-Marc Fournier
- Tourism: Raymond Bachand
- Economic Development, Innovation and Export Trade : Raymond Bachand

== See also ==
- 2007 Quebec general election
