= 2010 Canadian electoral calendar =

2010 elections in Canada

This is a list of elections in Canada in 2010. Included are provincial, municipal and federal elections, by-elections on any level, referendums and party leadership races at any level.

== February ==
- 4 February: Provincial by-election in Toronto Centre

== March ==
- 2 March: Provincial by-election in Concordia, Manitoba
- 4 March: Provincial by-elections in Ottawa West—Nepean and Leeds—Grenville, Ontario

== July ==
- 5 July: Provincial by-election in Vachon, Quebec

== September ==
- 13 September: Provincial by-election in Saint-Laurent, Quebec
- 27 September: 2010 New Brunswick general election

== October ==
- 2 October: 2010 Prince Edward Island Progressive Conservative Party leadership election
- 18 October: 2010 Alberta municipal elections
- 25 October: 2010 Ontario municipal elections
- 27 October: 2010 Manitoba municipal elections
- 27 October: 2010 Saskatchewan municipal elections

== November ==
- 1 November: 2010 Prince Edward Island municipal elections, in Charlottetown, Cornwall, Stratford and Summerside
- 29 November: Provincial by-election in Kamouraska-Témiscouata, Quebec
- 29 November: 2010 Canadian federal by-elections

== December ==
- 2 December: Provincial by-election in Conception Bay East - Bell Island, Newfoundland and Labrador
- 6 December: Nunavut municipal elections, 2010 (hamlets)
- 13 December: Mayoral by-election in Iqaluit, Nunavut
- 13 December: Northwest Territories municipal elections, 2010 (hamlets)
- 13 December: Territorial by-election in Whitehorse Centre, Yukon

== See also ==
- Municipal elections in Canada
- Elections in Canada
