= 2010 Quebec provincial by-elections =

Three provincial by-elections were held in Quebec in 2010 to fill vacancies in the National Assembly.

== Vachon ==
The district of Vachon was vacated by Parti Québécois MNA Camil Bouchard on January 6, 2010. The by-election took place on July 5, 2010. The riding was held by the PQ.

Vachon by-election, July 5, 2010
| Party | Candidate | Votes | % | ±% |
|---|---|---|---|---|
| Parti Québécois | Martine Ouellet | 7,863 | 59.15 | +10.51 |
| Liberal | Simon-Pierre Diamond | 3,236 | 24.34 | -7.94 |
| Action démocratique | Alain Dépatie | 879 | 6.61 | -7.06 |
| Québec solidaire | Sébastien Robert | 727 | 5.47 | +3.23 |
| Green | Yvon Rudolphe | 419 | 3.15 | -0.01 |
| Independent | Denis Durand | 98 | 0.74 | -2.42 |
| Independent | Régent Millette | 71 | 0.53 | - |

== Saint-Laurent ==
The district of Saint-Laurent was vacated by Liberal MNA Jacques Dupuis on August 9, 2010. The by-election took place on September 13, 2010.

The Gazette, the main English newspaper in Montreal, took the unusual step of endorsing Action démocratique du Québec candidate Jose Fiorillo over Quebec Liberal Party candidate Jean-Marc Fournier, calling Fournier a parachute candidate who deserved to be rejected by the voters. Despite this, the riding was held by the Liberals.

Saint-Laurent by-election, September 13, 2010
| Party | Candidate | Votes | % | ±% |
|---|---|---|---|---|
| Liberal | Jean-Marc Fournier | 7,126 | 64.01 | -10.38 |
| Parti Québécois | Philippe Leclerc | 1,996 | 17.93 | +1.28 |
| Action démocratique | Jose Fiorillo | 931 | 8.36 | +3.57 |
| Québec solidaire | Marie Josèphe Pigeon | 566 | 5.08 | +1.61 |
| Green | Tim Landry | 513 | 4.61 | - |

== Kamouraska-Témiscouata ==
The district of Kamouraska-Témiscouata was vacated by Liberal MNA Claude Béchard on September 7 due to his pancreatic cancer, which he died from later the same day. The by-election took place on November 29.

The riding was captured by the PQ, reflecting the Liberals' declining popularity due in part to their refusal to hold a public inquiry into construction industry corruption. In response to the by-election results, Premier Jean Charest announced he would create a permanent unit to investigate corruption in the construction industry.

Kamouraska-Témiscouata by-election, November 29, 2010
| Party | Candidate | Votes | % | ±% |
|---|---|---|---|---|
| Parti Québécois | André Simard | 7,213 | 36.85 | +15.70 |
| Liberal | France Dionne | 7,017 | 35.85 | -17.85 |
| Action démocratique | Gérald Beaulieu | 4,509 | 23.03 | +1.47 |
| Québec solidaire | Serge Proulx | 522 | 2.67 | -0.27 |
| Green | Frédéric Brophy Nolan | 314 | 1.60 | - |
