= Listuguj Mi'gmaq First Nation =

Listuguj
- Indian reserve
- Listuguj Mi'gmaq First Nation
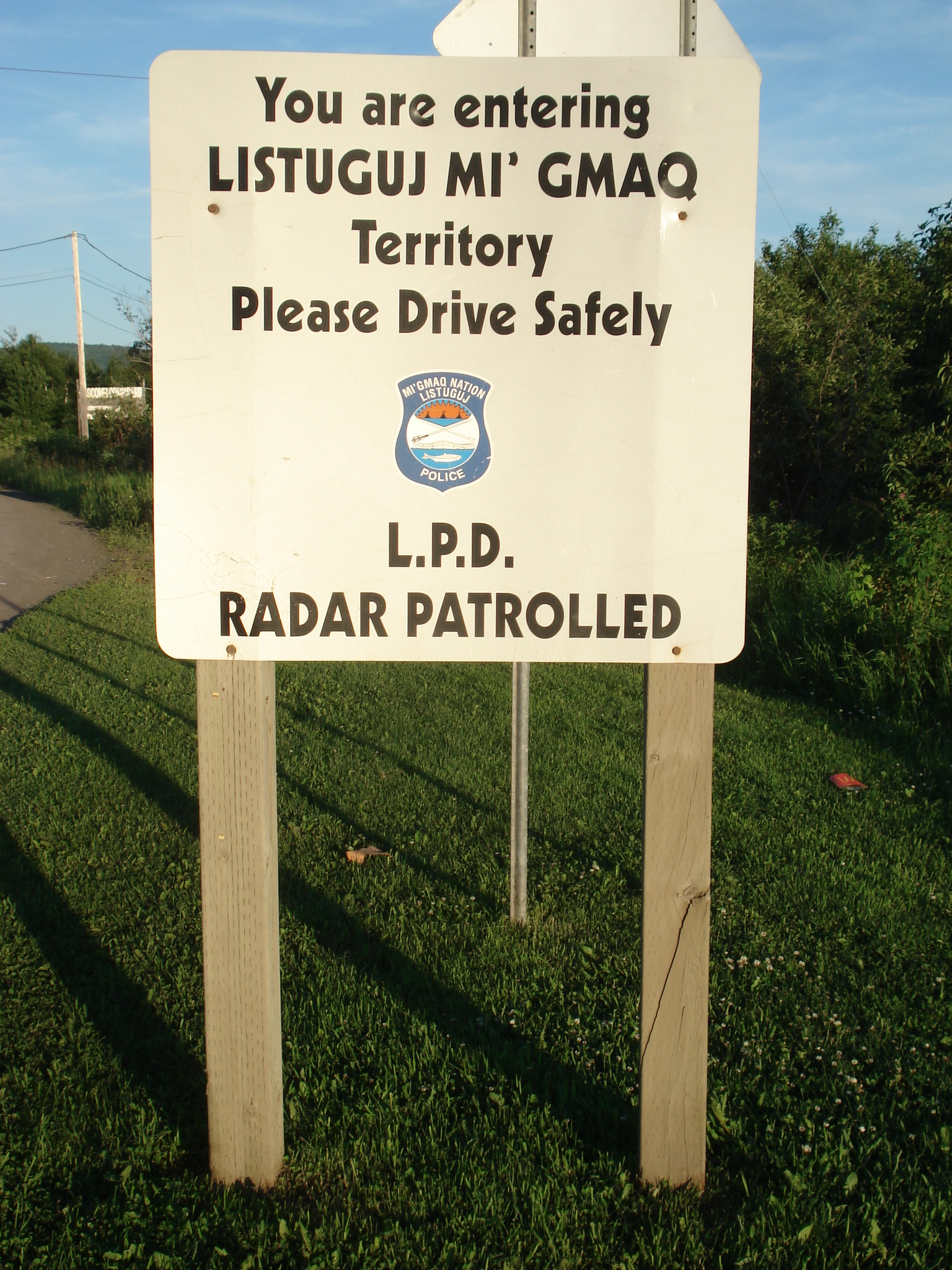
- Entrance of Listuguj Miꞌgmaq First Nation

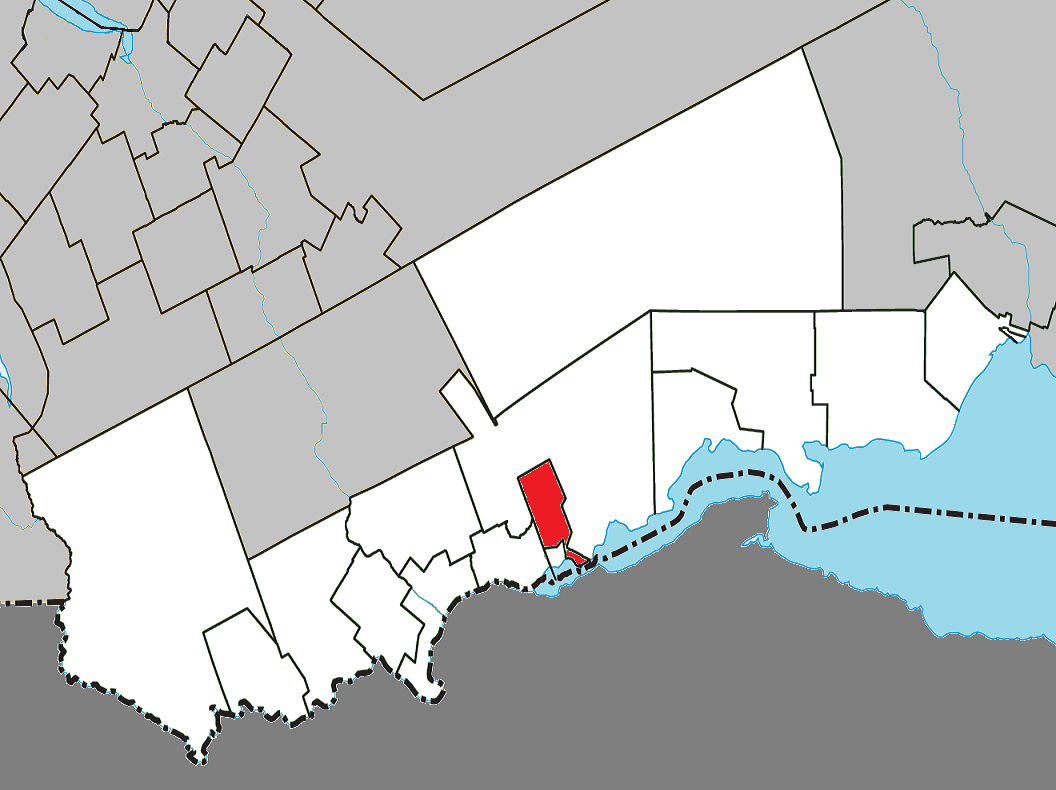
- Location within Avignon RCM

- Location within Quebec
- Coordinates: 48.013005°N 66.705100°W
- Country: Canada
- Province: Quebec
- Region: Gaspésie–Îles-de-la-Madeleine
- RCM: Avignon
- Electoral Districts Federal: Gaspésie—Les Îles-de-la-Madeleine—Listuguj
- Provincial: Bonaventure

Government
  - Type: Band
  - Chief: Scott Martin
  - Councillors: List of Members: Ali Barnaby; Annette Barnaby; Chad Gedeon; Gordon Issac Jr.; Dr. Cathy Martin; George Martin; Sky Metallic; Wendell Metallic; Kevin Methot; Erwin Molley; Alexander Morrison; Sheila Swasson
  - MP: Alexis Deschênes (BQ)
  - MNA: Catherine Blouin (CAQ)

Area
  - Land: 44.23 km^{2} (17.08 sq mi)

Population (2022)
  - Total: 2,076
  - Density: 46.9/km^{2} (121/sq mi)
  - Dwellings: 575
- Time zone: UTC-4 (EST)
  - Summer (DST): UTC-3 (EDT)
- Postal Code: G0C
- Area code: 418
- Access Routes: R-132
- Median Income*: $30,656 CDN
- Website: http://listuguj.ca/
- Median household income, 2016 (all households)

The Listuguj Mi'gmaq First Nation (French: Première Nation de Listuguj Mi'gmaq) (in Francis-Smith orthography Listukuj Míkmaq) (formerly known as Restigouche) is a Mi'gmaq First Nations band government with a registered population (2022) of 4,248 members, most of whom are of Mi'kmaq ancestry. The name Listuguj, is the origin for the name of the Restigouche River, as well as other nearby places also carrying the name Restigouche. Listuguj is also used as a name for one of the Míkmaq orthographies. Its southern border is adjacent to Pointe-à-la-Croix, Quebec.

== History ==
=== Battle of the Restigouche (1760) ===
The "Battle of the Restigouche", was the last naval battle between the British and the French during the Seven Years' War. In 1760, after the fall of Quebec, the French hurried to send reinforcements across the Atlantic. 400 troops were sent in merchant ships from Bordeaux. However, when they reached the Saint Lawrence River, the fleet commander discovered that the area was already occupied by a strong British fleet. He decided to sail south to the bottom of the Bay of Chaleur, and established gun batteries on the shore of the Restigouche River, near Listuguj. Eventually, they were spotted by British Captain John Byron, who engaged battle there. The battle opposed 3 French ships and ground batteries and a coalition of Mi'gmaq, French and Acadian irregular troops, against a 70-gun British ship and 2 frigates. The French and their allies lost this battle, ending the hopes of reconquering Quebec.

=== 1981 Salmon Raid ===
On June 11 and 20, 1981, the Quebec Provincial Police conducted controversial raids on the reserve to stop the Mi'gmaq from asserting their control over their native fishery. Federal Indian Affairs Minister John Munro was among those critical of the manner in which the Quebec government and provincial minister Lucien Lessard had acted. All convictions resulting from the arrests were eventually overturned.

The raids and their aftermath were documented by Alanis Obomsawin in her 1984 film Incident at Restigouche. The events were also depicted in the short story "Migwite'tmeg: We Remember It" by Brandon Mitchell in the 2019 graphic novel anthology This Place: 150 Years Retold.

== Arts and culture ==
The community is depicted in the 2021 documentary series Gespe'gewa'gi: The Last Land.

Artist Marc Rankiel recorded a song named "Listuguj" as a tribute to its citizens on his album Hairy in 2024.

== Government ==
Of the members of the Listuguj First Nation, 2,076 persons reside on the federal Indian reserve that was set aside by the legislature of Lower Canada in 1853, for the exclusive use of the majority of Mi'gmaq in this region. The remaining Mi'kmaq live off-reserve in the eastern United States and across Canada, but stay connected to the community through modern communications and travel to Listuguj for annual events such as the salmon harvest in June, St. Ann's Day in July, or the traditional powwow in August. All community members, regardless of residence, participate in democratic elections held every two years to elect one Chief and twelve Councillors in accordance with Canada's Indian Act Election Regulations, however only community members with residence in Listuguj could participate in the Ratification Vote for the Settlement Agreement which took place on December 13, 2014. The community is also allied to other Mi'gmaq communities in the Gaspé region of Quebec and in northern New Brunswick. Together, their elected Chiefs advance ancestral claims to self-government and to the traditional territory called Gespe'gewa'gi ('Kespékewáki), the last land.

Gespe'gewa'gi is the Mi'gmaq Nation District that extends from the Miramichi River to the tip of the Gaspé Peninsula, a land area that straddles the modern day Quebec/New Brunswick border. The First Nation is a strong advocate of Aboriginal peoples in Canada, and Aboriginal and treaty rights. Its main resource is the Atlantic salmon and other fruits of the waters and forests, including modern harvest of timber. Political representatives of the Mi'gmaq of Listuguj and the greater district of Gespe'gewa'gi continue talks with the Government of Quebec over access to traditional lands.

Despite being in Quebec, it follows Atlantic Time like neighbouring New Brunswick.

== See also ==
- List of anglophone communities in Quebec
