= Bonaventure (provincial electoral district) =

Provincial electoral district in Quebec, Canada

Quebec electoral district
- Coordinates: 48.274°N 65.762°W

Provincial electoral district
- Legislature: National Assembly of Quebec
MNA
Pier-Luc Bujold
Parti Québécois
- District created: 1867
- First contested: 1867
- Last contested: 2026

Demographics
- Population (2011): 43,430
- Electors (2012): 36,042
- Area (km²): 10,893.9
- Pop. density (per km²): 4
- Census division(s): Avignon, Bonaventure, Le Rocher-Percé
- Census subdivision(s): Bonaventure, Caplan, Carleton-sur-Mer, Cascapédia–Saint-Jules, Chandler, Escuminac, Hope, Hope Town, L'Ascension-de-Patapédia, Maria, Matapédia, New Carlisle, New Richmond, Nouvelle, Paspébiac, Pointe-à-la-Croix, Port-Daniel–Gascons, Ristigouche-Sud-Est, Saint-Alexis-de-Matapédia, Saint-Alphonse, Saint-André-de-Restigouche, Saint-Elzéar, Saint-François-d'Assise, Saint-Godefroi, Saint-Siméon, Shigawake; Listuguj, Gesgapegiag; Rivière-Bonaventure, Rivière-Nouvelle, Ruisseau-Ferguson

Bonaventure (French pronunciation: [bɔnavɑ̃tyʁ]) is a provincial electoral district in the Gaspésie–Îles-de-la-Madeleine region of Quebec, Canada, that elects members to the National Assembly of Quebec. It is located on the southern shore of the Gaspé Peninsula and encompasses several towns along the Baie des Chaleurs and the New Brunswick border. It notably includes the municipalities of Chandler, Carleton-sur-Mer, New Richmond, Paspébiac, Maria, and Bonaventure.

It was originally created for the 1867 election (and an electoral district of that name existed earlier in the Legislative Assembly of the Province of Canada and the Legislative Assembly of Lower Canada).

In the change from the 2001 to the 2011 electoral map, it gained Chandler from Gaspé electoral district.

== Linguistic demographics ==
- Francophone: 84.4%
- Anglophone: 13.8%
- Allophone: 1.8%

== Members of the Legislative Assembly / National Assembly ==
Legislature	Years	Member	Party
1st	1867–1871	Clarence Hamilton	Liberal
2nd	1871–1874	Théodore Robitaille	Conservative
2nd	1874–1875	Pierre-Clovis Beauchesne	Conservative
3rd	1875–1876	Pierre-Clovis Beauchesne	Conservative
3rd	1877–1878	Joseph-Israël Tarte	Conservative
4th	1878–1881	Joseph-Israël Tarte	Conservative
5th	1881–1882	Louis-Joseph Riopel	Conservative
5th	1882–1886	Henri-Josué Martin	Conservative
6th	1886–1890	Henri-Josué Martin	Conservative
7th	1890–1892	Honoré Mercier	Liberal
8th	1892–1894†	Honoré Mercier	Liberal
8th	1894–1897	François-Xavier Lemieux	Liberal
9th	1897–1897	François-Xavier Lemieux	Liberal
9th	1897–1900	William Henry Clapperton	Liberal
10th	1900–1904	William Henry Clapperton	Liberal
11th	1904–1908	John Hall Kelly	Liberal
12th	1908–1912	John Hall Kelly	Liberal
13th	1912–1914	John Hall Kelly	Liberal
13th	1914–1916	Joseph-Fabien Bugeaud	Liberal
14th	1916–1919	Joseph-Fabien Bugeaud	Liberal
15th	1919–1923	Joseph-Fabien Bugeaud	Liberal
16th	1923–1924	Joseph-Fabien Bugeaud	Liberal
16th	1924–1927	Pierre-Émile Côté	Liberal
17th	1927–1931	Pierre-Émile Côté	Liberal
18th	1931–1935	Pierre-Émile Côté	Liberal
19th	1935–1936	Pierre-Émile Côté	Liberal
20th	1936–1939	Henri Jolicœur	Union Nationale
21st	1939–1944	Pierre-Émile Côté	Liberal
22nd	1944–1948	Henri Jolicœur	Union Nationale
23rd	1948–1952	Henri Jolicœur	Union Nationale
24th	1952–1956	Henri Jolicœur	Union Nationale
25th	1956–1960	Gérard D. Levesque	Liberal
26th	1960–1962	Gérard D. Levesque	Liberal
27th	1962–1966	Gérard D. Levesque	Liberal
28th	1966–1970	Gérard D. Levesque	Liberal
29th	1970–1973	Gérard D. Levesque	Liberal
30th	1973–1976	Gérard D. Levesque	Liberal
31st	1976–1981	Gérard D. Levesque	Liberal
32nd	1981–1985	Gérard D. Levesque	Liberal
33rd	1985–1989	Gérard D. Levesque	Liberal
34th	1989–1993†	Gérard D. Levesque	Liberal
34th	1994–1994	Marcel Landry	Parti Québécois
35th	1994–1998	Marcel Landry	Parti Québécois
36th	1998–2003	Nathalie Normandeau	Liberal
37th	2003–2007	Nathalie Normandeau	Liberal
38th	2007–2008	Nathalie Normandeau	Liberal
39th	2008–2011	Nathalie Normandeau	Liberal
39th	2011–2012	Damien Arsenault	Liberal
40th	2012–2014	Sylvain Roy	Parti Québécois
41st	2014–2018	Sylvain Roy	Parti Québécois
42nd	2018–2021	Sylvain Roy	Parti Québécois
42nd	2021–2022	Sylvain Roy	Independent
43rd	2022–2026	Catherine Blouin	Coalition Avenir Québec
44th	2026–Present	Pier-Luc Bujold	Parti Québécois

== Election results ==
2026 Quebec general election
** Preliminary results — Not yet official **
Party	Candidate	Votes	%	±%
Parti Québécois	Pier-Luc Bujold	9,893	46.54	+16.48
Coalition Avenir Québec	Catherine Blouin	4,596	21.62	–22.83
Liberal	Christian Cyr	2,928	13.77	+5.21
Conservative	Dominique Côté	2,026	9.53	+4.07
Québec solidaire	Yv Bonnier Viger	1,813	8.53	–2.30
Total valid votes		21,256	98.54	–0.32
Total rejected ballots		316	1.46	+0.32
Turnout		21,572	60.08	–2.68
Electors on the lists		35,906		
Parti Québécois gain from Coalition Avenir Québec		Swing		+19.66
Source: Élections Québec

2022 Quebec general election
Party	Candidate	Votes	%	±%
Coalition Avenir Québec	Catherine Blouin	9,919	44.45	+28.45
Parti Québécois	Alexis Deschênes	6,708	30.06	–8.40
Québec solidaire	Catherine Cyr Wright	2,417	10.83	–4.17
Liberal	Christian Cyr	1,911	8.56	–16.96
Conservative	François Therrien	1,219	5.46	New
L'Union fait la force	Anne Marie Lauzon	82	0.37	New
Climat Québec	Jocelyn Rioux	57	0.26	New
Total valid votes		22,313	98.86	
Total rejected ballots		257	1.14	+0.04
Turnout		22,570	62.76	+0.50
Electors on the lists		35,960		
Coalition Avenir Québec gain from Parti Québécois		Swing		+18.42
Source: Élections Québec

2018 Quebec general election
Party	Candidate	Votes	%	±%
Parti Québécois	Sylvain Roy	8,416	38.46	-7.24
Liberal	François Whittom	5,586	25.53	-16.67
Coalition Avenir Québec	Hélène Desaulniers	3,502	16	+11.74
Québec solidaire	Catherine Cyr Wright	3,282	15	+8.82
Independent	Guy Gallant	575	2.63	
Green	Heather Imhoff	312	1.43	
Citoyens au pouvoir	Daniel Bouchard	209	0.96	
Total valid votes		21,882	98.91	
Total rejected ballots		242	1.09	
Turnout		22,124	62.27	
Eligible voters		35,530		
Parti Québécois hold		Swing		+4.72
Source(s) "Rapport des résultats officiels du scrutin". Élections Québec.

2014 Quebec general election
Party	Candidate	Votes	%	±%
Parti Québécois	Sylvain Roy	11,380	45.70	-1.85
Liberal	Damien Arsenault	10,508	42.20	+7.31
Québec solidaire	Patricia Chartier	1,540	6.18	+1.03
Coalition Avenir Québec	Jean-Marc Landry	1,061	4.26	-6.88
Parti nul	Patrick Dubois	283	1.14	–
Option nationale	Louis-Patrick St-Pierre	130	0.52	-0.75
Total valid votes		24,902	99.12	–
Total rejected ballots		222	0.88	–
Turnout		25,124	69.44	+0.13
Electors on the lists		36,179	–	–

2012 Quebec general election
Party	Candidate	Votes	%	±%
Parti Québécois	Sylvain Roy	11,809	47.55	+10.33
Liberal	Damien Arsenault	8,665	34.89	-14.57
Coalition Avenir Québec	Jean-Marc Landry	2,766	11.14	+8.85*
Québec solidaire	Patricia Chartier	1,278	5.15	-3.77
Option nationale	Louis-Patrick St-Pierre	315	1.27	–
Total valid votes		24,833	99.19	–
Total rejected ballots		204	0.81	–
Turnout		25,037	69.31	+14.75
Electors on the lists		36,121	–	–

* Result compared to Action démocratique

Quebec provincial by-election, December 5, 2011
Party	Candidate	Votes	%	±%
Liberal	Damien Arsenault	7,887	49.46	-14.77
Parti Québécois	Sylvain Roy	5,935	37.22	+8.16
Québec solidaire	Patricia Chartier	1,422	8.92	+5.72
Action démocratique	Georges Painchaud	365	2.29	-1.23
Green	Jean Cloutier	206	1.29	–
Independent	Martin Zibeau	131	0.82	–
Total valid votes		15,946	99.04	–
Total rejected ballots		154	0.96	–
Turnout		16,100	54.56	-3.46
Electors on the lists		29,510	–	–

2008 Quebec general election
Party	Candidate	Votes	%	±%
Liberal	Nathalie Normandeau	10,707	64.23	+11.35
Parti Québécois	Marcel Landry	4,844	29.06	-0.48
Action démocratique	Denise Porlier	586	3.52	-8.68
Québec solidaire	Patricia Chartier	533	3.20	-2.18
Total valid votes		16,670	98.86	–
Total rejected ballots		193	1.14	–
Turnout		16,863	58.02	-9.78
Electors on the lists		29,066	–	–

2007 Quebec general election
Party	Candidate	Votes	%	±%
Liberal	Nathalie Normandeau	10,221	52.88	-7.20
Parti Québécois	Doris Chapados	5,710	29.54	-2.13
Action démocratique	Karine Delarosbil	2,357	12.20	+6.68
Québec solidaire	Hélène Morin	1,039	5.38	–
Total valid votes		19,327	98.79	–
Total rejected ballots		236	1.21	–
Turnout		19,563	67.80	-2.60
Electors on the lists		28,853	–	–

2003 Quebec general election
Party	Candidate	Votes	%	±%
Liberal	Nathalie Normandeau	11,975	60.08	+12.85
Parti Québécois	Marc Tétreault	6,313	31.67	-14.85
Action démocratique	Maurice Anglehart	1,101	5.52	-0.72
Green	Michel Goudreau	542	2.72	–
Total valid votes		19,931	98.95	–
Total rejected ballots		212	1.05	–
Turnout		20,143	70.40	-5.23
Electors on the lists		28,612	–	–

1998 Quebec general election
Party	Candidate	Votes	%	±%
Liberal	Nathalie Normandeau	10,681	47.23	+4.45
Parti Québécois	Marcel Landry	10,521	46.52	-6.02
Action démocratique	Maurice Anglehart	1,412	6.24	+2.32
Total valid votes		22,614	98.97	–
Total rejected ballots		235	1.03	–
Turnout		22,849	75.63	-4.74
Electors on the lists		30,211	–	–

1995 Quebec referendum
Side	Votes	%
Non	13,759	51.58
Oui	12,914	48.42

1994 Quebec general election
Party	Candidate	Votes	%	±%
Parti Québécois	Marcel Landry	12,411	52.54	-3.69
Liberal	Mario Morin	10,105	42.78	-0.99
Action démocratique	Maurice Anglehart	925	3.92	–
Natural Law	Céline Chamard	180	0.76	–
Total valid votes		23,621	99.21	–
Total rejected ballots		189	0.79	–
Turnout		23,810	80.37	+1.52
Electors on the lists		29,626	–	–

Quebec provincial by-election, February 21, 1994
Party	Candidate	Votes	%	±%
Parti Québécois	Marcel Landry	12,087	56.23	+28.92
Liberal	Nicole Appleby Arbour	9,409	43.77	-15.88
Total valid votes		21,496	98.45	–
Total rejected ballots		338	1.55	–
Turnout		21,834	78.85	+4.88
Electors on the lists		27,689	–	–

1992 Charlottetown Accord referendum
Side	Votes	%
Oui	10,939	51.67
Non	10,232	48.33

1989 Quebec general election
Party	Candidate	Votes	%	±%
Liberal	Gérard D. Levesque	11,778	59.65	-6.27
Parti Québécois	Emmanuel Le Brasseur	5,392	27.31	-5.52
Unity	Ferne Fairservice Howatson	1,266	6.41	–
Green	Claude Michaud	1,062	5.38	–
Lemon	Jean-François Caron	246	1.25	–
Total valid votes		19,744	98.75	–
Total rejected ballots		249	1.25	–
Turnout		19,993	73.97	-0.88
Electors on the lists		27,029	–	–

1985 Quebec general election
Party	Candidate	Votes	%	±%
Liberal	Gérard D. Levesque	13,701	65.92	+11.97
Parti Québécois	James McBrearty	6,824	32.83	-11.21
Christian Socialist	Réjean Violette	259	1.25	–
Total valid votes		20,784	98.77	–
Total rejected ballots		259	1.23	–
Turnout		21,043	74.85	-4.54
Electors on the lists		28,114	–	–

1981 Quebec general election
Party	Candidate	Votes	%	±%
Liberal	Gérard D. Levesque	11,609	53.95	+5.32
Parti Québécois	Claude Martel	9,476	44.04	+13.34
Union Nationale	Diane Dugas Racicot	432	2.01	-17.08
Total valid votes		21,517	99.43	–
Total rejected ballots		123	0.57	–
Turnout		21,640	79.39	-1.48
Electors on the lists		27,259	–	–

1980 Quebec referendum
Side	Votes	%
Non	14,715	66.82
Oui	7,308	33.18

1976 Quebec general election
Party	Candidate	Votes	%	±%
Liberal	Gérard D. Levesque	9,771	48.63	-21.01
Parti Québécois	Jean-Paul Audet	6,168	30.70	+12.11
Union Nationale	Louis-Georges Roy	3,836	19.09	+11.74
Ralliement créditiste	Mariette Fortin	318	1.58	-2.84
Total valid votes		20,093	98.34	–
Total rejected ballots		240	1.66	–
Turnout		20,433	80.87	+2.26
Electors on the lists		25,265	–	–

1973 Quebec general election
Party	Candidate	Votes	%	±%
Liberal	Gérard D. Levesque	12,936	69.64	+9.25
Parti Québécois	Nicole Martin	3,454	18.59	+7.56
Union Nationale	Louis-Georges Roy	1,365	7.35	-18.61
Parti créditiste	Jean-Jacques Rastoldo	821	4.42	+1.80
Total valid votes		18,576	98.42	–
Total rejected ballots		298	1.58	–
Turnout		18,874	78.61	-5.32
Electors on the lists		24,009	–	–

1970 Quebec general election
Party	Candidate	Votes	%
Liberal	Gérard D. Levesque	11,803	60.39
Union Nationale	Jean-Guy Roussy	5,074	25.96
Parti Québécois	Alcide Huard	2,155	11.03
Ralliement créditiste	Lucien Boily	513	2.62
Total valid votes		19,545	98.52
Total rejected ballots		294	1.48
Turnout		19,839	83.93
Electors on the lists		23,637	–

1966 Quebec general election
Party	Candidate	Votes	%
Liberal	Gérard D. Levesque	10,888	60.41
Union Nationale	Réal Labonté	7,136	39.59
Total valid votes		18,024	98.64
Total rejected ballots		249	1.36
Turnout		18,273	83.93
Electors on the lists		23,181	–

1962 Quebec general election
Party	Candidate	Votes	%
Liberal	Gérard D. Levesque	9,525	57.28
Union Nationale	Léo-Albert Poirer	7,104	42.72
Total valid votes		16,629	99.02
Total rejected ballots		164	0.98
Turnout		16,793	85.26
Electors on the lists		19,696	–

1960 Quebec general election
Party	Candidate	Votes	%
Liberal	Gérard D. Levesque	8,513	51.61
Union Nationale	Léo-Albert Poirer	7,981	48.39
Total valid votes		16,494	98.65
Total rejected ballots		226	1.35
Turnout		16,720	86.03
Electors on the lists		19,435	–

1956 Quebec general election
Party	Candidate	Votes	%
Liberal	Gérard D. Levesque	8,551	52.68
Union Nationale	Henri Jolicoeur	7,682	47.32
Total valid votes		16,233	97.35
Total rejected ballots		442	2.65
Turnout		16,675	84.06
Electors on the lists		19,837	–

1952 Quebec general election
Party	Candidate	Votes	%
Union Nationale	Henri Jolicoeur	8,875	52.14
Liberal	André Dubé	8,145	47.86
Total valid votes		17,020	98.27
Total rejected ballots		299	1.73
Turnout		17,319	87.00
Electors on the lists		19,907	–

1948 Quebec general election
Party	Candidate	Votes	%
Union Nationale	Henri Jolicoeur	8,384	50.99
Liberal	André Dubé	7,669	46.64
Independent UN	Lucien Grenier	252	1.53
Union des électeurs	Jean-Marie Gagnon	137	0.83
Total valid votes		16,442	98.73
Total rejected ballots		211	1.27
Turnout		16,653	84.86
Electors on the lists		19,625	–

1878 Quebec general election
Party	Candidate	Votes	%
Conservative	Joseph-Israël Tarte	1,337	66.12
Liberal	Charles-L. Cyr	685	33.88
Total valid votes		2,022	98.59
Total rejected ballots		29	1.41
Turnout		2,051	75.96
Electors on the lists		2,700	–

Quebec provincial by-election, 1877
Party	Candidate	Votes	%
Conservative	Pierre-Clovis Beauchesne	965	64.12
Liberal	John Robinson Hamilton	417	27.71
Liberal	Menalque Tremblay	123	8.17
Total valid votes		1,505	100.00
Turnout		1,505	57.66
Electors on the lists		2,610	–

Quebec provincial by-election, 1875
Party	Candidate	Votes	%
Conservative	Pierre-Clovis Beauchesne	837	52.18
Liberal	John Robinson Hamilton	767	47.82
Total valid votes		1,604	98.40
Total rejected ballots		26	1.60
Turnout		1,630	61.39
Electors on the lists		2,655	–

Quebec provincial by-election, 1874
Party	Candidate	Votes	%
Conservative	Pierre-Clovis Beauchesne	732	56.26
Liberal	John Robinson Hamilton	569	43.74
Total valid votes		1,301	100.00
Turnout		1,478	52.38
Electors on the lists		2,484	–

1871 Quebec general election
Party	Candidate	Votes	%
Conservative	Théodore-R. Robataille	819	55.41
Liberal	Clarence Hamilton	659	44.59
Total valid votes		1,478	100.00
Turnout		1,478	63.90
Electors on the lists		2,313	–

1867 Quebec general election
Party	Candidate	Votes	%
Liberal	Clarence Hamilton	861	60.93
Conservative	John Meagher	565	39.07
Total valid votes		1,446	100.00
Turnout		1,446	84.02
Electors on the lists		1,721	–

== See also ==
- List of Quebec provincial electoral districts
- Canadian provincial electoral districts
