= List of ministers of justice of Quebec =

Ministers of Justice of the Province of Quebec, Canada

The following is a list of the people who have served as head of the Ministry of Justice of Quebec, or as Attorneys-General of Quebec, Canada East and Lower Canada. Prior to 1965, the name of the position was "Attorney General for Quebec". In 1965, the name of the position was changed to the "Minister of Justice", who is ex officio the Attorney General for Quebec.

== List of ministers of justice ==
- Simon Jolin-Barrette (June 22, 2020 – present)
- Sonia LeBel (October 18, 2018 – June 22, 2020)
- Stéphanie Vallée (April 23, 2014 – October 18, 2018)
- Bertrand St-Arnaud (September 19, 2012 – April 23, 2014)
- Jean-Marc Fournier (August 11, 2010 – September 19, 2012)
- Kathleen Weil (December 18, 2008 – August 11, 2010)
- Jacques P. Dupuis (April 18, 2007 – December 18, 2008)
- Yvon Marcoux (February 18, 2005 – April 18, 2007)
- Jacques P. Dupuis (April 27, 2004 – February 18, 2005)
- Marc Bellemare (April 29, 2003 – April 27, 2004)
- Normand Jutras (October 29, 2002 – April 29, 2003)
- Paul Bégin (March 8, 2001 – October 28, 2002)
- Linda Goupil (December 15, 1998 – March 8, 2001)
- Serge Ménard (August 25, 1997 – December 15, 1998)
- Paul Bégin (September 26, 1994 – August 25, 1997)
- Roger Lefebvre (January 11, 1994 – September 26, 1994)
- Gil Rémillard (June 23, 1988 – January 11, 1994)
- Herbert Marx (December 12, 1985 – June 23, 1988)
- Raynald Fréchette (October 3, 1985 – December 12, 1985)
- Pierre-Marc Johnson (March 5, 1984 – October 3, 1985)
- Marc-André Bédard (November 26, 1976 – March 5, 1984)
- Gérard D. Levesque (July 30, 1975 – November 26, 1976)
- Jérôme Choquette (May 12, 1970 – July 30, 1975)
- Rémi Paul (July 23, 1969 – May 12, 1970)
- Jean-Jacques Bertrand (June 16, 1966 – July 23, 1969)
- Claude Wagner (June 4, 1965 – June 16, 1966)

== List of attorneys-general ==
=== Quebec (Procureur Général du Québec) ===
Prior to 1965, the senior justice official in the province was the Attorney General. This role was created in 1867 replacing the role of Attorney General of Canada East and before 1841 the Attorney General of Lower Canada.

- Gédéon Ouimet 1867–1873
- George Irvine 1873–1874
- Levi Ruggles Church 1874–1876
- Auguste-Réal Angers 1876–1878
- David Alexander Ross 1878–1879
- Louis-Onésime Loranger 1879–1882
- Joseph-Alfred Mousseau 1882–1884
- Louis-Olivier Taillon 1884–1887
- Honoré Mercier 1887–1888
- Arthur Turcotte 1888–1890
- Joseph-Emery Robidoux 1890–1891
- Thomas Chase Casgrain 1891–1892, 1892–1896
- Edmund James Flynn 1892
- Louis-Philippe Pelletier 1896–1897
- Sir François-Xavier-Horace Archambeault 1897–1905
- Lomer Gouin 1905–1919
- Louis-Alexandre Taschereau 1919–1936
- Joseph-Edouard Perrault 1936
- Charles-Auguste Bertrand 1936
- Maurice Duplessis 1936–1939
- Wilfrid Girouard 1939–1942
- Léon Casgrain 1942–1944
- Maurice Duplessis 1944–1959
- Antoine Rivard 1959–1960
- Georges-Émile Lapalme 1960–1963
- René Hamel 1963–1964
- Claude Wagner 1964–1965

=== Canada East (Procureur Général du Canada-Est) 1841–1867 ===
- Charles Richard Ogden 1841–1842
- Louis-Hippolyte Lafontaine 1842–1843
- James Smith 1844–1847
- William Badgley 1847–1848
- Louis-Hippolyte Lafontaine 1848–1851
- Lewis Thomas Drummond 1851–1856
- Sir George-Étienne Cartier 1856–1862
- Sir Antoine-Aimé Dorion 1863–1864
- Sir George-Étienne Cartier 1864–1867

=== Lower Canada (Procureur Général du Bas-Canada) 1791–1841 ===
- Jonathan Sewell 1790–1792 (acting)
- James Monk 1792–1794
- Jonathan Sewell 1795–1808
- Edward Bowen 1808–1809
- Norman Fitzgerald Uniacke 1809–1810
- Edward Bowen 1810–1812 (acting)
- Norman Fitzgerald Uniacke 1812–1825
- James Stuart 1825–1832
- Charles Richard Ogden 1833–1840

=== Attorney General of Quebec ===
- James Monk 1776–1789

== See also ==
- Ministry of Justice (Quebec)
- Directeur des poursuites criminelles et pénales
