= Claude Forget =

Canadian economist and politician

Member of the National Assembly of Quebec for Saint-Laurent
- In office 1973–1981
- Preceded by: Léo Pearson
- Succeeded by: Germain Leduc

Personal details
- Born: May 28, 1936 (age 89) Montreal, Quebec
- Party: Liberal
- Spouse: Monique Jérôme-Forget
- Profession: economist
- Cabinet: Minister of Social Affairs (1973–1976)

Claude E. Forget, OC (born May 28, 1936) is a Canadian economist and former politician.

Born in Montreal, Quebec, Forget holds a master's degree in public finances from the London School of Economics as well as a bachelor's degree in economics. He was also admitted to the Barreau du Québec in 1959. He was a teacher in economics at the Université du Québec à Montréal for three years.

In 1973, he was elected to the National Assembly of Quebec from the riding of Saint-Laurent. A Liberal, he was the Minister of Social Affairs from 1973 to 1976 in the cabinet of Robert Bourassa. He was re-elected in 1976 and 1981. He resigned on November 17, 1981.

In 1984, he was appointed chairman of the Commission of Inquiry on Unemployment Insurance.

In 1991, he was made an Officer of the Order of Canada.

Has been quoted as saying, "Our political system itself reaches a position of equilibrium by generating such dysfunctional incentives."
