= Pier-Luc Bujold =

Pier-Luc Bujold MNA

Member of the National Assembly for Bonaventure
- Incumbent
- Assumed office October 5, 2026
- Preceded by: Catherine Blouin

Personal details
- Party: Parti Québécois

Pier-Luc Bujold is a Canadian politician who is a candidate for the National Assembly of Quebec for Bonaventure in the 2026 Quebec general election as a member of the Parti Québécois.

Bujold is a nurse and was president of the Eastern Quebec chapter of the Syndicat des infirmières, infirmières auxiliaires et inhalothérapeutes prior to his election.
