= Saint-Elzéar, Gaspésie–Îles-de-la-Madeleine =

Saint-Elzéar
- Municipality
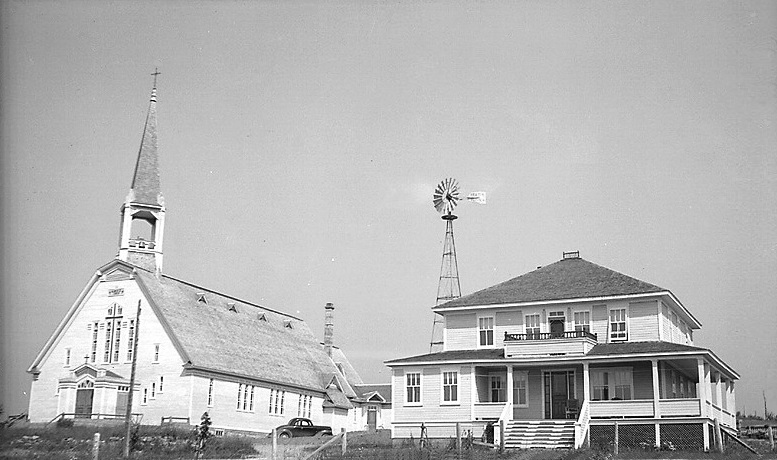
- Church of Saint-Elzéar

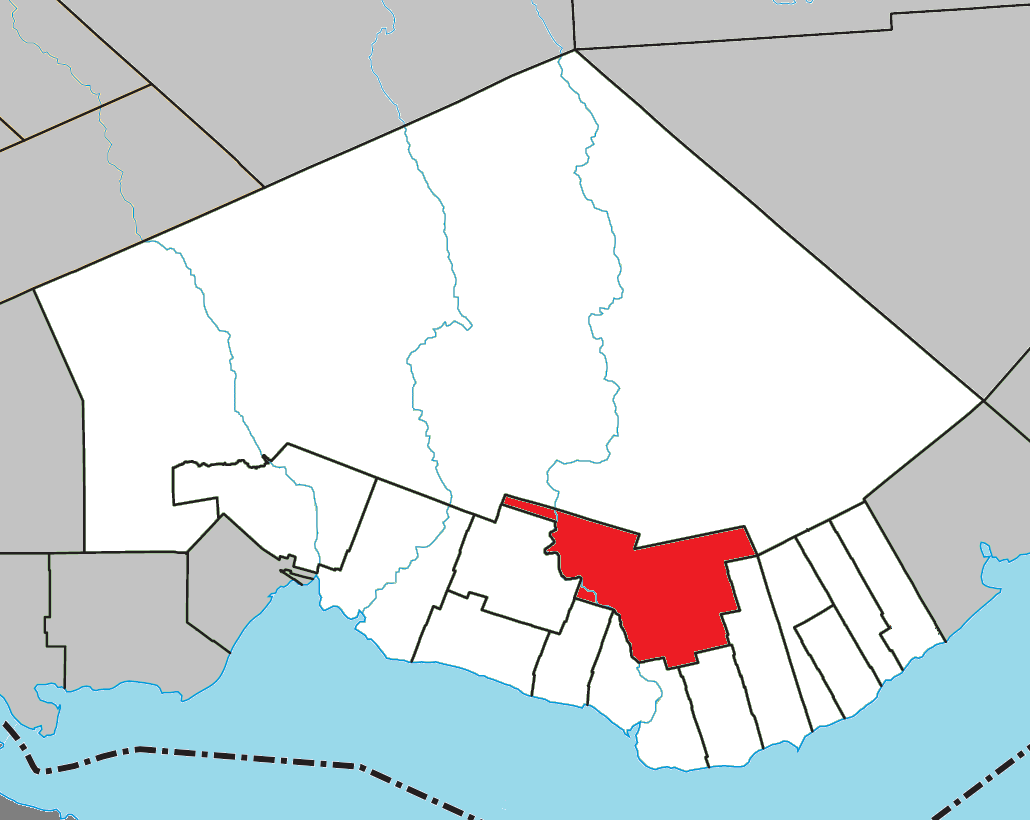
- Location within Bonaventure RCM

- Location in eastern Quebec
- Coordinates: 48°09′N 65°24′W
- Country: Canada
- Province: Quebec
- Region: Gaspésie– Îles-de-la-Madeleine
- RCM: Bonaventure
- Settled: 1924
- Constituted: January 1, 1965

Government
  - Mayor: Paquerette Poirier
  - Federal riding: Gaspésie—Les Îles-de-la-Madeleine—Listuguj
  - Prov. riding: Bonaventure

Area
  - Total: 208.62 km^{2} (80.55 sq mi)
  - Land: 204.16 km^{2} (78.83 sq mi)

Population (2021)
  - Total: 464
  - Density: 2.3/km^{2} (6.0/sq mi)
  - Pop (2016-21): ▲1.3%
  - Dwellings: 227
- Time zone: UTC−5 (EST)
  - Summer (DST): UTC−4 (EDT)
- Postal code(s): G0C 2W0
- Area codes: 418 and 581
- Highways: No major routes
- Website: www.saintelzear.net

Saint-Elzéar (French pronunciation: [sɛ̃t‿ɛlzeaʁ]) is a municipality in Quebec, Canada. It is also known as Saint-Elzéar-de-Bonaventure to distinguish it from Saint-Elzéar in the Chaudière-Appalaches region.

== History ==
Settlement of the place began in 1924, at the instigation of Elzéar Matte who was vicar general in Bonaventure at that time. That same year, the Saint-Elzéar Parish was founded and the Saint-Elzéar-de-Bonaventure Post Office opened.

The Municipality of Saint-Elzéar was formed on January 1, 1965, from territory ceded by the Municipalities of New Carlisle, Bonaventure, and Paspébiac-Ouest, as well as portions of unorganized areas.

In 2022, Saint-Elzéar received media attention after an Alert Ready notification concerning a shelter-in-place order for the municipality was sent to phones across the entire province of Quebec.

== Demographics ==
Canada census – Saint-Elzéar community profile

	2021	2016	2011
Population	464 (+1.3% from 2016)	458 (-1.9% from 2011)	467 (-8.1% from 2006)
Land area	204.16 km^{2} (78.83 sq mi)	203.58 km^{2} (78.60 sq mi)	204.76 km^{2} (79.06 sq mi)
Population density	2.3/km^{2} (6.0/sq mi)	2.2/km^{2} (5.7/sq mi)	2.3/km^{2} (6.0/sq mi)
Median age	49.2 (M: 49.6, F: 48.8)	53.4 (M: 51.8, F: 55.0)	48.9 (M: 48.1, F: 50.2)
Private dwellings	227 (total) 204 (occupied)	266 (total)	261 (total)
Median household income	$68,000	$48,704	$40,799

References: 2021 2016 2011

Historical Census Data - Saint-Elzéar, Gaspésie–Îles-de-la-Madeleine, Quebec

Year	Pop.	±%
1966	863	—
1971	696	−19.4%
1976	617	−11.4%
1981	614	−0.5%
1986	599	−2.4%
1991	554	−7.5%

Year	Pop.	±%
1996	565	+2.0%
2001	508	−10.1%
2006	508	+0.0%
2011	467	−8.1%
2016	458	−1.9%
2021	464	+1.3%

Source: Statistics Canada

== Government ==
List of former mayors:

- Léonard Arsenault (1965–1969, 1971–1973, 1975–1977)
- Jean Albert Larocque (1969–1971)
- Gilles Martin (1973–1974)
- Jean Baptiste Chicoine (1974–1975)
- Onidas Poirier (1977–1981)
- Sylvio Ouellet (1981–1983)
- Conrad Poirier (1983–1993)
- Damien Arsenault (1993–2011)
- Raymond Marcoux (2011–2017)
- Marie-Louis Bourdages (2017–2021)
- Paquerette Poirier (2021–present)

== See also ==
- List of municipalities in Quebec
