= Gespe'gewa'gi: The Last Land =

Canadian television documentary series

- Country of origin: Canada

Original release
- Release: 2021

GESPE’GEWA’GI: The Last Land is a Canadian television documentary series produced by Rezolution Pictures, which premiered on APTN in 2021. The series features Indigenous people of Atlantic Canada and the fisheries that sustained them, both culturally and economically. The show is co-executive produced by Ernest Webb (Cree) and Greg Lawrence, produced by Lisa M. Roth. In season 2, Heather Condo (Mi’gmaq) returns as Director Trainee and April Maloney (Mi’kmaq) stars as director of photography trainee, with the support of the ISO-Netflix Indigenous Production Apprenticeship Program.

== Synopsis ==
Season 1 of the documentary series about the Mi’gmaq fishers of Listuguj, Que., covering their fishing operations in the Gaspé region. It first aired in Winter 2021 and is available on APTN lumi and CBC Gem.

Season 2 is a 10-part, half-hour documentary series about Mi’kmaq people on the East coast, covering their fishing operations. It also gives an inside perspective on how First Nations commercial fishing industries have grown to be a key economic and cultural support for the indigenous communities.

Season 3 will expand the coverage of Mi’kma’ki, different communities in Unama’ki, Cape Breton, and Epekwitk (meaning lying in the water), also known as P.E.I.. The series covers their fishing operations, while also introducing the science and conservation efforts surrounding the fisheries and the triumphs and challenges that come with running them.
