= Sylvain Roy =

Canadian politician

Member of the National Assembly of Quebec for Bonaventure
- In office September 4, 2012 – August 28, 2022
- Preceded by: Damien Arsenault
- Succeeded by: Catherine Blouin

Personal details
- Born: August 3, 1964 (age 62) Saint John, New Brunswick, Canada
- Party: Independent (June 2021–present)
- Other political affiliations: Parti Québécois (before June 2021)

Sylvain Roy is a Canadian politician from Quebec, who served as a member of the National Assembly of Quebec for the electoral district of Bonaventure.

He was elected in the 2012 Quebec general election, defeating Liberal incumbent Damien Arsenault. He had previously lost to Arsenault in a by-election on December 5, 2011.

On June 4, 2021, Roy announced on Twitter that he would leave the Parti Québécois caucus and sit as an independent MNA, citing disagreements regarding the application of Bill 101 in CEGEP along with other issues that deteriorated his trust relationship with his former caucus.
