= Catherine Blouin =

Canadian politician

Member of the National Assembly of Quebec for Bonaventure
- In office October 3, 2022 – October 5, 2026
- Preceded by: Sylvain Roy
- Succeeded by: Pier-Luc Bujold

Quebec Minister of Families
- In office April 21, 2026 – October 21, 2026
- Premier: Christine Fréchette
- Preceded by: Kateri Champagne Jourdain
- Succeeded by: Méganne Perry Mélançon

Personal details
- Born: 1986 Saint-Jérôme, Quebec
- Party: Coalition Avenir Québec

Catherine Blouin is a Canadian politician, who was elected to the National Assembly of Quebec in the 2022 Quebec general election. She represented the riding of Bonaventure as a member of the Coalition Avenir Québec.

== Electoral record ==
2022 Quebec general election: Bonaventure
Party	Candidate	Votes	%	±%
Coalition Avenir Québec	Catherine Blouin	9,919	44.45	+28.45
Parti Québécois	Alexis Deschênes	6,708	30.06	–8.40
Québec solidaire	Catherine Cyr Wright	2,417	10.83	–4.17
Liberal	Christian Cyr	1,911	8.56	–16.96
Conservative	François Therrien	1,219	5.46	New
L'Union fait la force	Anne Marie Lauzon	82	0.37	New
Climat Québec	Jocelyn Rioux	57	0.26	New
Total valid votes		22,313	98.86	
Total rejected ballots		257	1.14	+0.04
Turnout		22,570	62.76	+0.50
Electors on the lists		35,960		
Coalition Avenir Québec gain from Parti Québécois		Swing		+18.42
Source: Élections Québec
