= Nathalie Normandeau =

Canadian politician (born 1968)

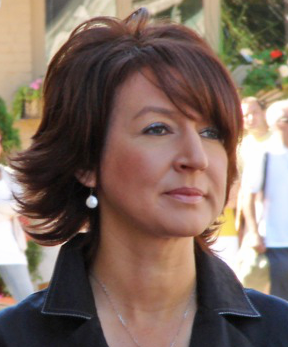

Deputy Premier of Quebec
- In office 2007–2011
- Premier: Jean Charest
- Preceded by: Jacques Dupuis
- Succeeded by: Line Beauchamp

Member of the National Assembly of Quebec for Bonaventure
- In office December 15, 1998 – September 6, 2011
- Preceded by: Marcel Landry
- Succeeded by: Damien Arsenault

Personal details
- Born: May 8, 1968 (age 57) Maria, Quebec
- Party: Quebec Liberal Party
- Cabinet: Deputy Premier and Minister of Natural Resources And Wildlife

Nathalie Normandeau (born May 8, 1968) is a Canadian politician from Quebec. She was MNA for the riding of Bonaventure in the Gaspésie region between 1998 and 2011. She was also Deputy Premier and a member of the Quebec Liberal Party.

== Biography ==
Normandeau attended the Université Laval in the early 1990s and obtained a bachelor's degree in political science and a certificate in African studies. While at university, she worked in the Quebec Premier's Office as a public relations officer and a secretary. She was elected mayor of the small Gaspésie town of Maria where she grew up, and held office from 1992 to 1995. She actively participated as a member of several local groups in the region.

Normandeau entered provincial politics in 1998 and was elected as the MNA for Bonaventure. She became the opposition critic for natural resources, fisheries and regions.

In 2003, when Jean Charest's Liberals defeated the Parti Québécois, Normandeau was re-elected for a second term and was named the Minister for regional development and tourism as well as the Minister responsible for the Gaspésie-Îles-de-la-Madeleine region. Following a cabinet shuffle in 2005, she was promoted to the position of Municipal Affairs replacing Jean-Marc Fournier who became the Education Minister.

She was re-elected in 2007 to become the new Deputy Premier and one of the prominent forces of the new minority government . She retained her position as Minister of Municipal Affairs and Regions and Minister for her region.

On April 23, 2009, Normandeau admitted to dating François Bonnardel, a member of the opposition Action démocratique du Québec (ADQ) caucus. Normandeau said Premier Charest was aware of the relationship and had no problem with it.

During a cabinet shuffle, Normandeau was named the Minister of Natural Resources and Wildlife succeeding Claude Béchard who was named the Minister of Agriculture, Fisheries and Food. Laurent Lessard inherited the municipal affairs portfolio.

On September 6, 2011, she announced her resignation as minister and member of the National Assembly, citing personal reasons. She has been romantically involved with former Montreal Police Chief Yvan Delorme.

== Corruption arrest ==
In April 2012, Normandeau was the subject of a Radio-Canada report over alleged ties to a construction industry executive while a cabinet minister.

In April 2014, UPAC investigation involves Normandeau in Liberal Party obscure financing

In March 2016, she is arrested by the UPAC, Quebec's anti-corruption unit, over illegal campaign financing. She was charged on six counts, including corruption, of a member of the legislature, fraud and bribery.

In September 2020, a judge dropped the charges due to unreasonable delays by the prosecution.

Political offices
Preceded by Jacques P. Dupuis	Deputy Premier of Quebec; 2007–2011	Succeeded by Line Beauchamp
Preceded by Jean-Marc Fournier	Minister of Municipal Affairs and Regions and Land Occupancy; 2005–2009	Succeeded by Laurent Lessard
Preceded by Richard Legendre	Minister of Tourism; 2003–2005	Succeeded by Francoise Gauthier
Preceded by Claude Bechard	Minister of Natural Resources and Wildlife; 2009–2011	Succeeded by Clément Gignac
