= Damien Arsenault =

Canadian politician

MNA for Bonaventure
- In office December 5, 2011 – 2012
- Preceded by: Nathalie Normandeau
- Succeeded by: Sylvain Roy

Personal details
- Born: November 20, 1960 (age 65) Saint-Elzéar, Quebec
- Party: Quebec Liberal Party

Damien Arsenault (born November 20, 1960) is a Canadian politician, who was elected to the National Assembly of Quebec in a by-election on December 5, 2011. He represented the electoral district of Bonaventure as a member of the Quebec Liberal Party caucus until September 2012.

Prior to his election to the legislature, Arsenault was the mayor of Saint-Elzéar.
