= Maria, Quebec =

Maria
- Municipality
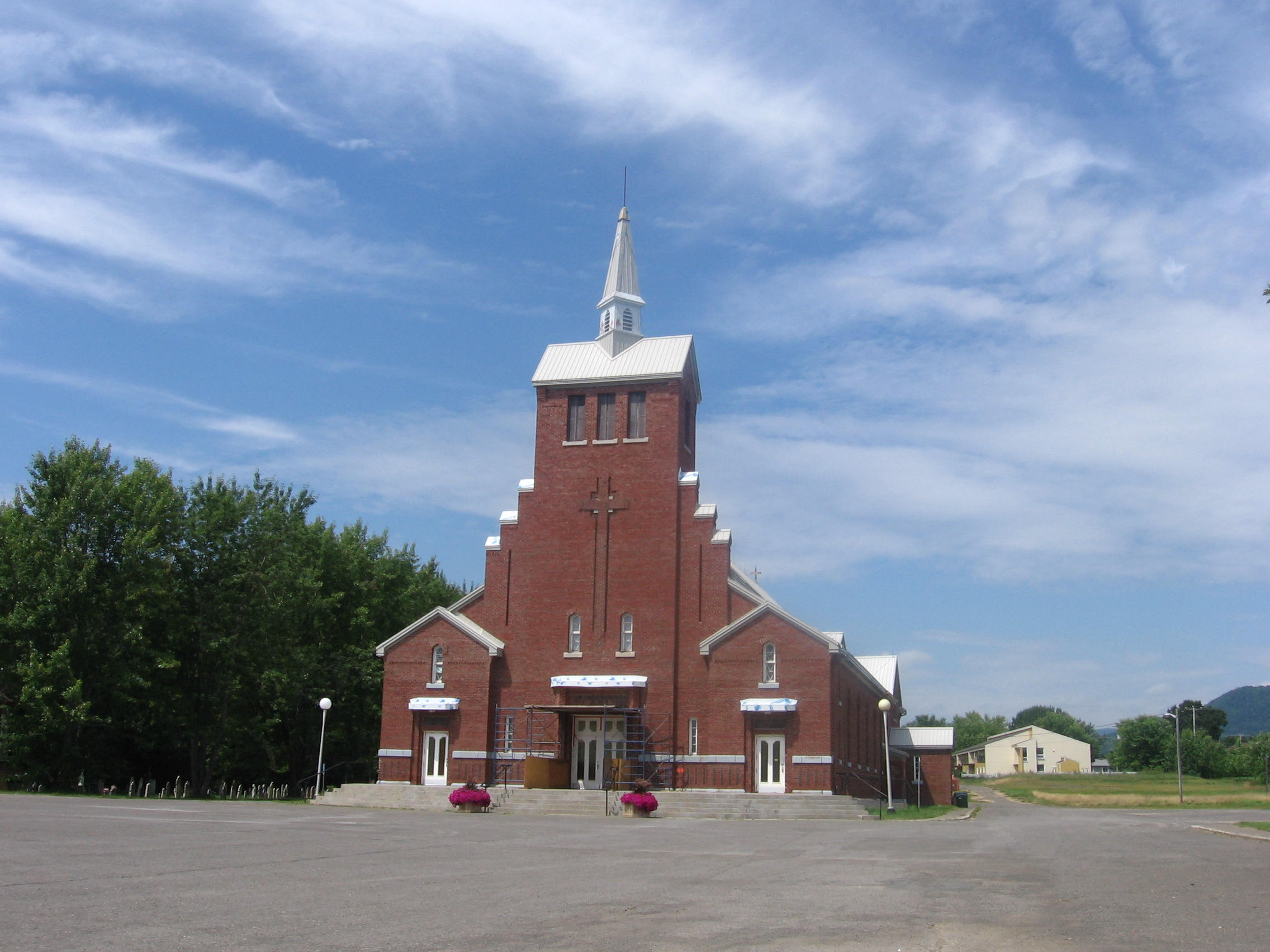
- Church in Maria

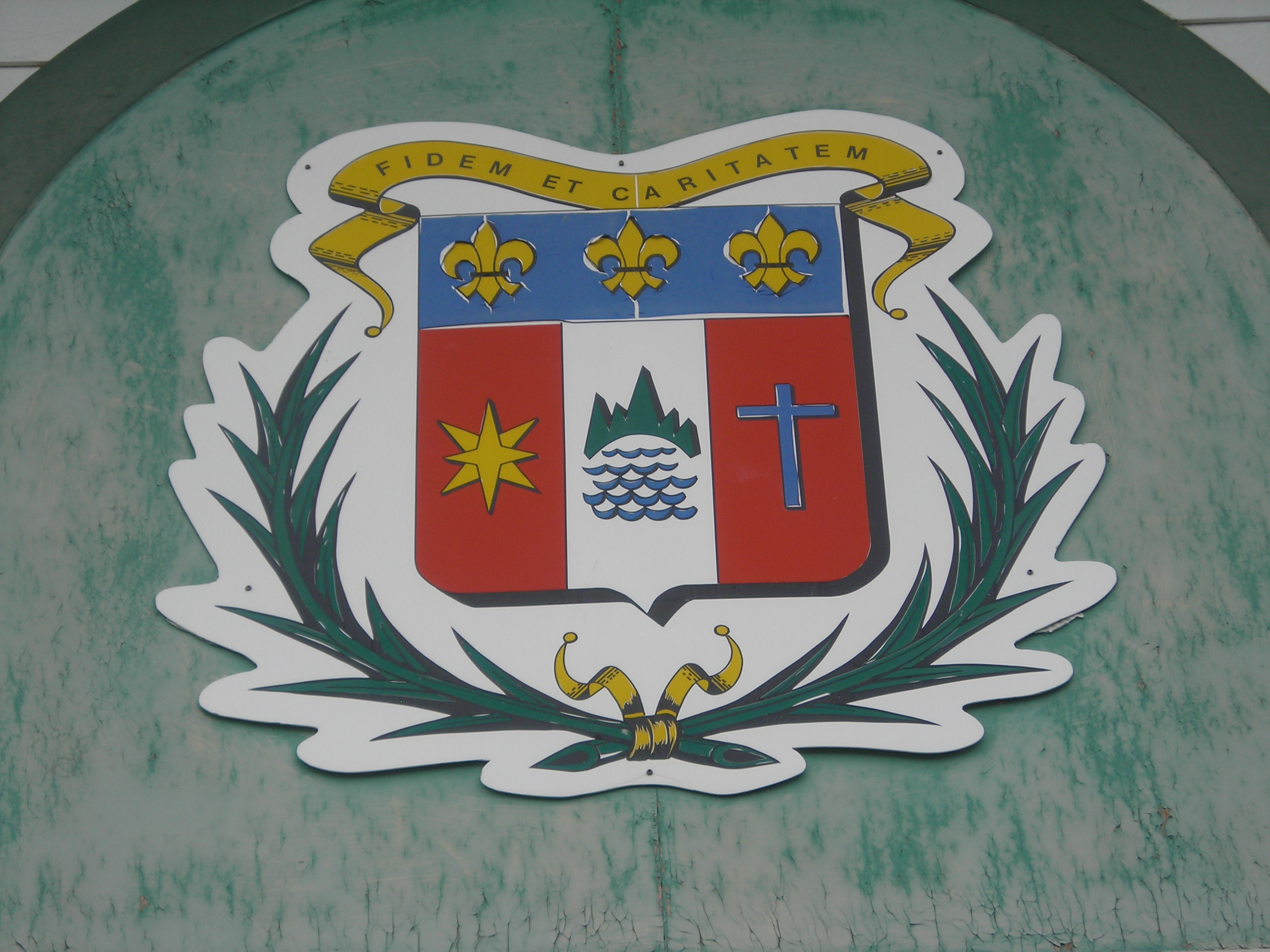
- Coat of arms
- Motto(s): Fidem et caritatem ("Faith and charity")
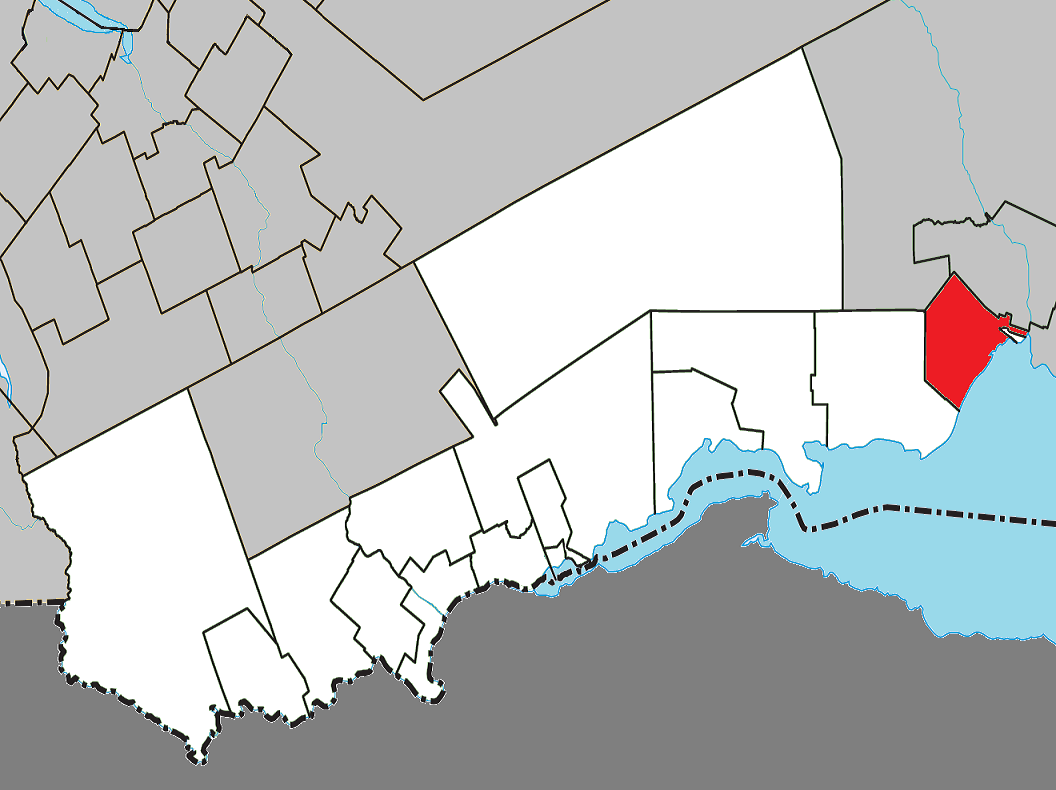
- Location within Avignon RCM

- Location in eastern Quebec
- Coordinates: 48°10′N 65°59′W
- Country: Canada
- Province: Quebec
- Region: Gaspésie– Îles-de-la-Madeleine
- RCM: Avignon
- Settled: 1774
- Constituted: July 1, 1855

Government
  - Mayor: Jean-Claude Landry
  - Federal riding: Gaspésie—Les Îles-de-la-Madeleine—Listuguj
  - Prov. riding: Bonaventure

Area
  - Total: 95.75 km^{2} (36.97 sq mi)
  - Land: 94.88 km^{2} (36.63 sq mi)

Population (2021)
  - Total: 2,760
  - Density: 29.1/km^{2} (75/sq mi)
  - Pop (2016-21): ▲5.5%
  - Dwellings: 1,229
- Time zone: UTC−5 (EST)
  - Summer (DST): UTC−4 (EDT)
- Postal code(s): G0C 1Y0
- Area codes: 418 and 581
- Highways: R-132
- Website: www.mariaquebec.com

Maria (French pronunciation: [maʁja]) is a municipality in Quebec, Canada.

== History ==
Maria had been the location of a Mi'kmaq summer coastal community prior to European settlement. In 1774, the area began to be settled by American Loyalists, and Scottish and Irish settlers. In 1842, the geographic township was formed, named in honour of Lady Maria Howard, wife of Guy Carleton and third daughter of Thomas Howard, 2nd Earl of Effingham.

In 1845, the Township Municipality of Maria was established, dissolved, and re-established in 1855. In 1860, the place experienced rapid development when a group of Acadians arrived and founded the Parish of Sainte-Brigitte-de-Maria.

In 1977, Maria changed status from township municipality to just municipality.

== Demographics ==
Canada census – Maria community profile

	2021	2016	2011
Population	2,760 (+5.5% from 2016)	2,615 (+3.1% from 2011)	2,536 (+5.6% from 2006)
Land area	94.88 km^{2} (36.63 sq mi)	95.09 km^{2} (36.71 sq mi)	94.86 km^{2} (36.63 sq mi)
Population density	29.1/km^{2} (75/sq mi)	27.5/km^{2} (71/sq mi)	25.3/km^{2} (66/sq mi)
Median age	53.2 (M: 52.0, F: 54.4)	51.2 (M: 49.1, F: 52.6)	45.9 (M: 45.6, F: 46.2)
Private dwellings	1,229 (total) 1,164 (occupied)	1,159 (total)	1,122 (total)
Median household income	$73,000	$64,384	$50,129

References: 2021 2016 2011

Historical Census Data - Maria, Quebec

Year	Pop.	±%
1861	1,823	—
1871	2,138	+17.3%
1881	2,298	+7.5%
1891	2,433	+5.9%
1901	2,460	+1.1%
1911	2,342	−4.8%
1921	1,946	−16.9%
1931	2,172	+11.6%

Year	Pop.	±%
1941	2,181	+0.4%
1951	1,520	−30.3%
1956	1,583	+4.1%
1961	1,696	+7.1%
1966	1,951	+15.0%
1971	2,004	+2.7%
1976	2,042	+1.9%
1981	2,277	+11.5%

Year	Pop.	±%
1986	2,461	+8.1%
1991	2,491	+1.2%
1996	2,581	+3.6%
2001	2,458	−4.8%
2006	2,401	−2.3%
2011	2,536	+5.6%
2016	2,615	+3.1%
2021	2,760	+5.5%

Source: Statistics Canada

Mother tongue:

- English as first language: 2.5%
- French as first language: 95.1%
- English and French as first language: 0.9%
- Other as first language: 0.9%

== Economy ==
The main economy of the municipality is the hospital which serves the entire region. The hospital of Maria was built between New Richmond and Carleton-sur-Mer.

== Notable people ==
Marie-Christine Lévesque, author

== See also ==
- List of municipalities in Quebec
