= Saint-Laurent (provincial electoral district) =

Provincial electoral district in Quebec, Canada

Coordinates: 45.506°N 73.708°W

Quebec electoral district
- Location in Montreal

Provincial electoral district
- Legislature: National Assembly of Quebec
MNA
Valérie Assouline
Liberal
- District created: 1965
- First contested: 1966
- Last contested: 2026

Demographics
- Population (2006): 78,792
- Electors (2014): 55,083
- Area (km²): 44.6
- Pop. density (per km²): 1,766.6
- Census division: Montreal (part)
- Census subdivision: Montreal (part)

Saint-Laurent (French: [sɛ̃lɔʁɑ̃]) is a provincial electoral district in the Montreal region of Quebec, Canada, which elects a member to the National Assembly of Quebec. It comprises part of the Ahuntsic-Cartierville borough and part of the Saint-Laurent borough of Montreal.

It was created for the 1966 election from parts of Jacques-Cartier and Laval electoral districts.

In the change from the 2001 to the 2011 electoral map, its territory was unchanged.

== Members of the Legislative Assembly / National Assembly ==
Legislature	Years	Member	Party
Riding created from Jacques-Cartier and Laval
28th	1966–1970	Léo Pearson	Liberal
29th	1970–1973	Léo Pearson	Liberal
30th	1973–1976	Claude Forget	Liberal
31st	1976–1981	Claude Forget	Liberal
32nd	1981–1981	Claude Forget	Liberal
32nd	1981–1985	Germain Leduc	Liberal
33rd	1985–1985	Germain Leduc	Liberal
33rd	1986–1989	Robert Bourassa	Liberal
34th	1989–1994	Robert Bourassa	Liberal
35th	1994–1998	Normand Cherry	Liberal
36th	1998–2003	Jacques Dupuis	Liberal
37th	2003–2007	Jacques Dupuis	Liberal
38th	2007–2008	Jacques Dupuis	Liberal
39th	2008–2010	Jacques Dupuis	Liberal
39th	2010–2012	Jean-Marc Fournier	Liberal
40th	2012–2014	Jean-Marc Fournier	Liberal
41st	2014–2018	Jean-Marc Fournier	Liberal
42nd	2018–2022	Marwah Rizqy	Liberal
43rd	2022–2025	Marwah Rizqy	Liberal
43rd	2025–2026	Marwah Rizqy	Independent
44th	2026–Present	Valérie Assouline	Liberal

== Election results ==
2026 Quebec general election
** Preliminary results — Not yet official **
Party	Candidate	Votes	%	±%
Liberal	Valérie Assouline	16,681	54.45	
Québec solidaire	Étienne Loiselle-Schiettekatte	5,067	16.54	
Conservative	Barry Rolbin	3,781	12.34	
Parti Québécois	Pierre-Étienne Nantel	2,570	8.39	
Coalition Avenir Québec	Tahmina Kabir	1,425	4.65	
Canadian	Audrey Baillairgé	544	1.78	
Green	Pierre-Christophe Dagher Falardeau	376	1.23	
Marxist–Leninist	Fernand Deschamps	114	0.37	
Independent	Joe Young	77	0.25	
Total valid votes				
Total rejected ballots				
Turnout			52.01	
Electors on the lists			–	–
Liberal hold		Swing		
Source: Élections Québec

2022 Quebec general election
Party	Candidate	Votes	%	±%
Liberal	Marwah Rizqy	14,304	49.97	-12.00
Coalition Avenir Québec	Mélanie Gauthier	4,091	14.29	-0.87
Conservative	Catherine St-Clair	3,973	13.88	+10.85
Québec solidaire	Gérard Briand	2,840	9.92	+1.30
Parti Québécois	Karl Dugal	1,696	5.92	-0.55
Bloc Montreal	Rizwan Muhammad Rajput	752	2.63	–
Canadian	Myrtis-Eirene Fossey	533	1.86	–
Green	Othmane Benzekri	439	1.53	-1.45
Total valid votes		28,628	98.68	–
Total rejected ballots		383	1.32	–
Turnout		29,011	50.96	
Electors on the lists		56,925		

2018 Quebec general election
Party	Candidate	Votes	%	±%
Liberal	Marwah Rizqy	17,669	61.97	-20.31
Coalition Avenir Québec	Marc Baaklini	4,322	15.16	
Québec solidaire	Marie Josèphe Pigeon	2,458	8.62	+3.13
Parti Québécois	Elias Dib Nicolas	1,846	6.47	-1.66
Conservative	Guy Morissette	863	3.03	+1.93
Green	Halimatou Bah	849	2.98	+0.94
New Democratic	Jacques Dago	432	1.52	
Marxist–Leninist	Fernand Deschamps	75	0.26	-0.04
Total valid votes		28,514	98.60	
Total rejected ballots		406	1.40	
Turnout		28,920	50.96	
Eligible voters		56,749		
Liberal hold		Swing		-10.16
Source(s) "Rapport des résultats officiels du scrutin". Élections Québec.

2014 Quebec general election
Party	Candidate	Votes	%	±%
Liberal	Jean-Marc Fournier	31,454	82.28	+16.61
Parti Québécois	Rachid Bandou	3,106	8.13	-3.20
Québec solidaire	Hasnaa Kadiri	2,100	5.49	+0.47
Green	Tidiane Diallo	796	2.04	+0.04
Conservative	Guy Morissette	420	1.10	–
Option nationale	Jennifer Beaudry	236	0.62	-0.50
Marxist–Leninist	Fernand Deschamps	115	0.30	+0.03
Total valid votes		38,227	98.74	–
Total rejected ballots		488	1.26	–
Turnout		38,715	70	+5.58
Electors on the lists		55,083	–	–

2012 Quebec general election
Party	Candidate	Votes	%	±%
Liberal	Jean-Marc Fournier	22,481	65.67	+1.66
Coalition Avenir Québec	George Manolikakis	4,902	14.32	+5.96*
Parti Québécois	Roger Gagnon	3,878	11.33	-6.60
Québec solidaire	Marie Josèphe Pigeon	1,718	5.02	-0.06
Green	Pierre Etienne Loignon	684	2.00	-2.61
Option nationale	Maxime Bellerose	384	1.12	–
Unité Nationale	Brian Jenkins	96	0.28	–
Marxist–Leninist	Fernand Deschamps	91	0.27	–
Total valid votes		34,234	99.03	–
Total rejected ballots		337	0.97	–
Turnout		34,571	64.52	+42.87
Electors on the lists		53,585	–	–

* Result compared to Action démocratique

Quebec provincial by-election, September 13, 2010
Party	Candidate	Votes	%	±%
Liberal	Jean-Marc Fournier	7,126	64.01	-10.38
Parti Québécois	Philippe Leclerc	1,996	17.93	+1.28
Action démocratique	Jose Fiorillo	931	8.36	+3.57
Québec solidaire	Marie Josèphe Pigeon	566	5.08	+1.61
Green	Tim Landry	513	4.61	–
Total valid votes		11,132	98.53	–
Total rejected ballots		166	1.47	–
Turnout		11,298	21.65	-19.24
Electors on the lists		52,186	–	–

2008 Quebec general election
Party	Candidate	Votes	%	±%
Liberal	Jacques Dupuis	15,663	74.39	+6.58
Parti Québécois	Gabrielle Dufour-Turcotte	3,505	16.65	+5.01
Action démocratique	Jose Fiorillo	1,009	4.79	-6.66
Québec solidaire	Bill Sloan	731	3.47	+0.56
Marxist–Leninist	Fernand Deschamps	147	0.70	+0.22
Total valid votes		21,055	98.77	–
Total rejected ballots		262	1.23	–
Turnout		21,317	40.89	-16.98
Electors on the lists		52,132	–	–

2007 Quebec general election
Party	Candidate	Votes	%	±%
Liberal	Jacques Dupuis	19,970	67.81	-9.85
Parti Québécois	William Fayad	3,428	11.64	-2.66
Action démocratique	Jose Fiorillo	3,373	11.45	+5.69
Green	Stephen Marchant	1,681	5.71	–
Québec solidaire	Wissam Saliba	856	2.91	+1.89*
Marxist–Leninist	Fernand Deschamps	141	0.48	-0.17
Total valid votes		29,449	99.22	–
Total rejected ballots		231	0.78	–
Turnout		29,680	57.87	-5.74
Electors on the lists		51,288	–	–

* Result compared to UFP

2003 Quebec general election
Party	Candidate	Votes	%	±%
Liberal	Jacques Dupuis	24,745	77.66	-0.37
Parti Québécois	William Fayad	4,556	14.30	-1.51
Action démocratique	Sophie Theoharopoulos	1,834	5.76	+1.71
UFP	Alain Pérusse	325	1.02	–
Marxist–Leninist	Fernand Deschamps	206	0.65	–
Equality	Louis Ottoni	199	0.62	-0.68
Total valid votes		31,865	98.87	–
Total rejected ballots		363	1.13	–
Turnout		32,228	63.61	-13.17
Electors on the lists		50,664	–	–

1998 Quebec general election
Party	Candidate	Votes	%	±%
Liberal	Jacques Dupuis	28,280	78.03	+1.30
Parti Québécois	Yves Beauregard	5,729	15.81	-1.09
Action démocratique	Elias Ghadban	1,468	4.05	+0.88
Equality	Jacques R. Labbé	472	1.30	+0.22
Communist	Oscar Chavez	165	0.46	+0.18
Socialist Democracy	Richard Lahaie	129	0.65	–
Total valid votes		36,243	99.11	–
Total rejected ballots		327	0.89	–
Turnout		36,570	76.78	-5.05
Electors on the lists		47,630	–	–

1995 Quebec referendum
Side	Votes	%
Non	34,856	82.85
Oui	7,214	17.15

1994 Quebec general election
Party	Candidate	Votes	%	±%
Liberal	Normand Cherry	25,711	76.73	+24.60
Parti Québécois	Louis Thibaudeau	5,602	16.72	−1.98
Action démocratique	Daniel Murray	1,061	3.17	–
Equality	Ray Moscato	362	1.08	−22.81
CANADA!	Tony Kondaks	243	0.73	–
Natural Law	Marc Hindle	154	0.46	–
Economic	François Blouin	147	0.44	–
Communist	Robert Bob Aubin	94	0.28	−0.25
Non-affiliated	Annette Kouri	72	0.21	–
Republic of Canada	Seng Phlang	61	0.18	–
Total valid votes		33,507	98.60	–
Total rejected ballots		476	1.40	–
Turnout		33,983	81.83	+7.71
Electors on the lists		41,530	–	–

1992 Charlottetown Accord referendum
Side	Votes	%
Oui	26,558	76.30
Non	8,250	23.70

1989 Quebec general election
Party	Candidate	Votes	%	±%
Liberal	Robert Bourassa	15,493	52.13	-30.57
Equality	Ciro Paul Scotti	7,101	23.89	–
Parti Québécois	Marie-France Charbonneau	5,559	18.70	–
Green	François Leduc	864	2.91	+1.47
New Democratic	Daniel Sabbah	248	0.83	-7.95
Communist	Thomas Hudson	158	0.53	–
Lemon	Marcel Provost	150	0.50	–
Workers	Jean Bilodeau	147	0.49	–
Total valid votes		29,720	98.41	–
Total rejected ballots		479	1.59	–
Turnout		30,199	74.12	+27.93
Electors on the lists		40,745	–	–

Quebec provincial by-election, January 20, 1986
Party	Candidate	Votes	%	±%
Liberal	Robert Bourassa	16,020	82.70	+8.48
New Democratic	Sid Ingerman	1,701	8.78	+5.36
Parti indépendantiste	Gilles Rhéaume	778	4.02	–
Green	Jacques Plante	278	1.44	–
Humanist	Anne Farrell	202	1.04	–
Independent	Vincent Trudel	177	0.91	–
Independent	Martin Lavoie	70	0.36	–
United Social Credit	Léopold Milton	66	0.34	–
Non-affiliated	Patricia Métivier	49	0.25	–
Independent	Jay Lawrence Taylor	31	0.16	–
Total valid votes		19,372	98.65	–
Total rejected ballots		266	1.35	–
Turnout		19,638	46.19	−26.22
Electors on the lists		42,514	–	–
Source: Official Results, Le Directeur général des élections du Québec.

== See also ==
- List of Quebec provincial electoral districts
- Canadian provincial electoral districts
