= Yvon Marcoux =

Canadian politician

MNA for Vaudreuil
- In office November 30, 1998 – April 7, 2014
- Preceded by: Daniel Johnson Jr.
- Succeeded by: Marie-Claude Nichols

Personal details
- Born: March 26, 1941 (age 85) Lévis, Quebec
- Party: Quebec Liberal Party
- Profession: administrator

Yvon Marcoux (born March 26, 1941, in Lévis, Quebec) is a politician and administrator in Quebec, Canada. He was the Member of the National Assembly of Quebec (MNA) for the riding of Vaudreuil from 1998 to 2014, as a member of the Quebec Liberal Party. He is also a former Minister of Justice in the Jean Charest government.

Marcoux studied at the Université Laval and obtained a bachelor's degree in arts as well as a licence in law in 1963 and obtained another diploma in law in 1996. He was admitted to the Bar of Quebec in 1964. For a few years he was a teacher in the faculty of law at Laval. He then worked for the Ministry of Finance and the Quebec Treasury Board.

Prior to his political career, Marcoux held several important administration positions including vice-president for the National Bank, Laurentian Bank and Trust La Laurentienne, in the early 1980s as well as key positions at the province-run "Société général de financement du Quebec" (SGF) as well as private supermarket Provigo. Before his jump to politics he was the general manager of the "Association des Hopitaux du Quebec".

Marcoux won in the 1998 elections the Vaudreuil seat which was formerly held by Daniel Johnson Jr. former Quebec Premier.

Marcoux was named Transport Minister in 2003 before being promoting to Justice Minister in a Cabinet shuffle in February 2005. He was re-elected in the 2007 elections for a third term but was not named in the new cabinet. Jacques P. Dupuis, who was the Minister of Public Safety, was appointed to the portfolio of Minister of Justice.

Marcoux is married and has four children and five grandchildren.

Political offices
Preceded by Jacques P. Dupuis	Minister of Justice (Quebec); 2005–2007	Succeeded by Jacques P. Dupuis
Preceded by Serge Menard	Minister of Transports; 2003–2005	Succeeded by Michel Després
