= Jacques Dupuis (politician) =

Canadian politician and lawyer (born 1948)

Jacques P. Dupuis
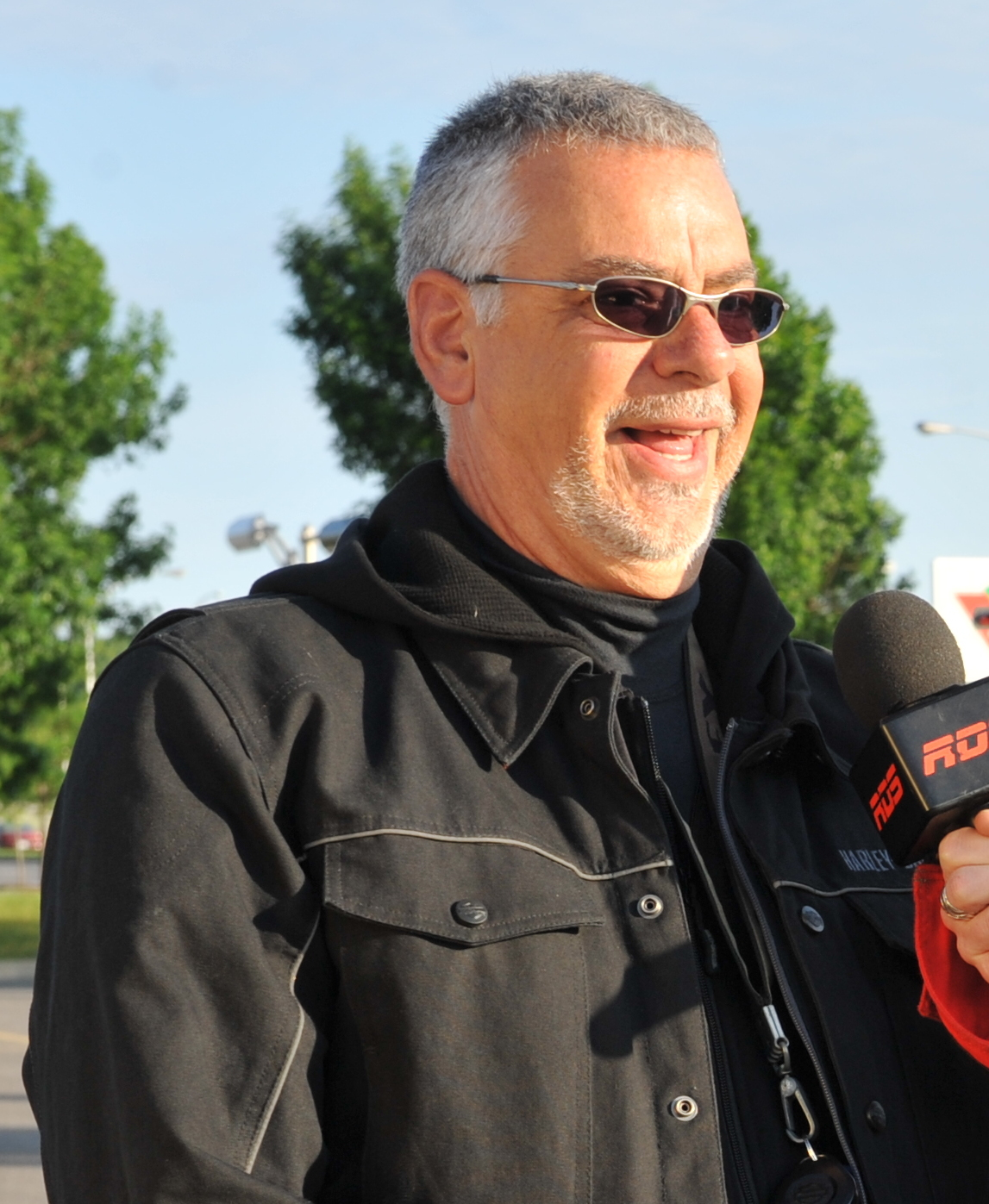
- Dupuis in 2008

Deputy Premier of Quebec
- In office 2005–2007
- Premier: Jean Charest
- Preceded by: Monique Gagnon-Tremblay
- Succeeded by: Nathalie Normandeau

Member of the National Assembly of Quebec for Saint-Laurent
- In office November 30, 1998 – August 9, 2010
- Preceded by: Normand Cherry
- Succeeded by: Jean-Marc Fournier

Personal details
- Born: November 25, 1948 (age 77) Montreal, Quebec
- Party: Quebec Liberal Party
- Education: Université de Montréal
- Profession: lawyer
- Cabinet: Minister of Public Safety; Government House Leader

Jacques P. Dupuis (born November 25, 1948) is a Canadian politician and lawyer. A member of the Quebec Liberal Party and former MNA for Saint-Laurent in the Montreal region, Dupuis is also a former Quebec Minister of Justice and was Minister of Public Security until 2010.

Born in Montreal, Quebec, Dupuis has a law degree from the Université de Montréal and was named to the Barreau du Québec in 1974. and is a former lawyer. He was a lawyer from 1974 to 1986 and from 1996 to 1997. He was also a designated teacher in Halifax, Nova Scotia a chief of staff for the Ministry of Workforce, Income Security and vocational training and for the Quebec Liberal Party and an Attorney General. He was also the vice-president of Association of Criminal Defence Lawyers of Montreal and a member of the Administrative Law Society.

He was first elected in the 1998 election in the riding of Saint-Laurent. In his first term, as an opposition member, he sat as critic to the Minister of Public Security from 1999 to 2003. He was re-elected in the 2003 election. In his second term he was named to the Cabinet, and also served as Minister of Reform of Democratic Institutions and Minister Responsible for the Laurentides Region and the Lanaudière from 2003 to 2005.

He was re-elected in 2007, and was renamed the Minister of Public Security and was added the portfolio of Justice but was no longer the Government House Leader and Deputy Premier, positions that were given to Jean-Marc Fournier and Nathalie Normandeau respectively.

Following his re-election in 2008, Dupuis kept his Public Safety Minister portfolio while adding the Canadian Intergovernmental Affairs and Democratic Institutions Reform but gave up the Justice portfolio to newcomer Kathleen Weil. In addition, Dupuis was renamed the House Leader after Fournier did not run for re-election. On June 23, 2009, Dupuis gave up on request the portfolio of Canadian Intergovernmental Affairs to Claude Bechard during a cabinet shuffle.

He announced he was resigning from the National Assembly on August 9, 2010.

Political offices
Preceded by Monique Gagnon-Tremblay	Deputy Premier of Quebec; 2005–2007	Succeeded by Nathalie Normandeau
Preceded by Andre Boisclair	Government House Leader (1st time); 2003–2007	Succeeded by Jean-Marc Fournier
Preceded by Jean-Marc Fournier	Government House Leader (2nd time); 2008–2010	Succeeded by Jean-Marc Fournier
Preceded by Jacques Chagnon	Minister of Public Security; 2005–2010	Succeeded by Robert Dutil
Preceded by Marc Bellemare	Minister of Justice (1st time); 2004–2005	Succeeded by Yvon Marcoux
Preceded by Yvon Marcoux	Minister of Justice (2nd time); 2007–2008	Succeeded by Kathleen Weil
Preceded by Benoit Pelletier	Minister of Canadian Intergovernmental Affairs & Democratic Institutions Reform; 2008–2009	Succeeded by Claude Bechard
