= Jean-Marc Fournier =

Canadian politician (born 1959)

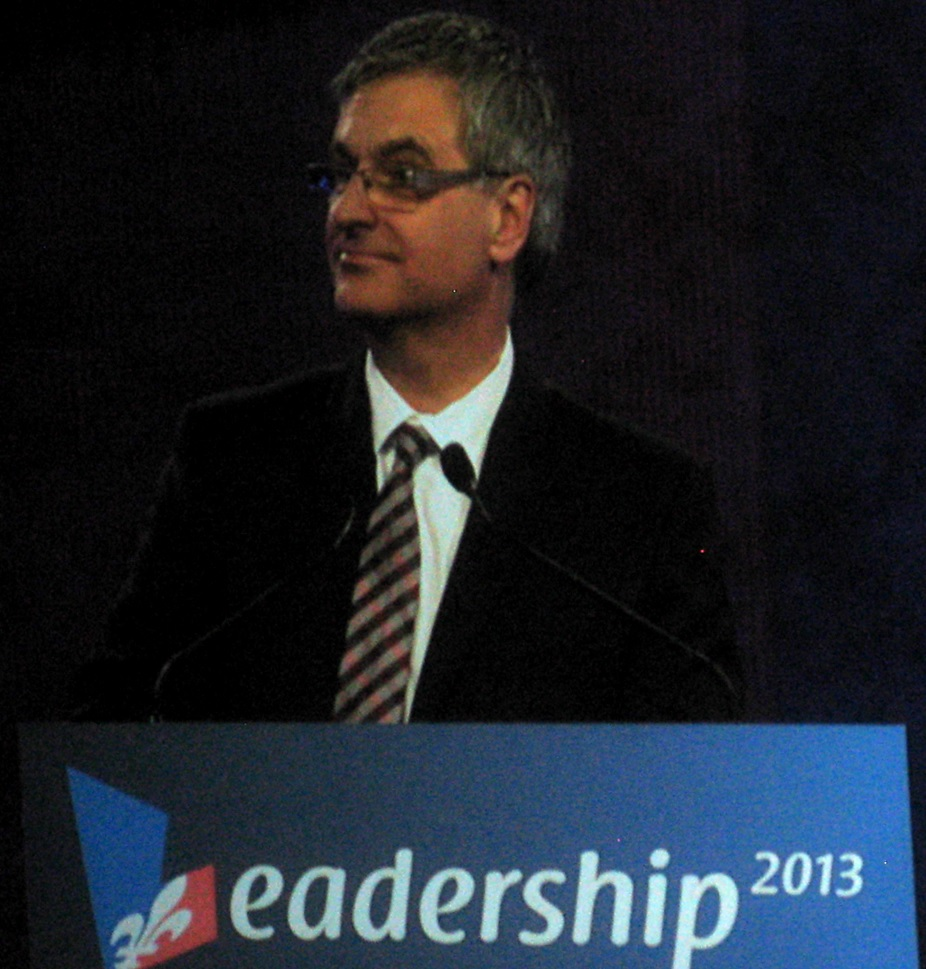

Leader of the Opposition in Quebec
- In office 19 September 2012 – 18 December 2013
- Preceded by: Pauline Marois
- Succeeded by: Philippe Couillard

Member of the National Assembly of Quebec for Saint-Laurent
- In office 13 September 2010 – 18 October 2018
- Preceded by: Jacques Dupuis
- Succeeded by: Marwah Rizqy

Member of the National Assembly of Quebec for Châteauguay
- In office 12 September 1994 – 5 November 2008
- Preceded by: Pierrette Cardinal
- Succeeded by: Pierre Moreau

Personal details
- Born: 7 October 1959 (age 67) Châteauguay, Quebec
- Party: Quebec Liberal Party
- Spouse: Maryse Legault
- Profession: Lawyer

Jean-Marc Fournier (born 7 October 1959) is a Quebec politician and a lawyer. He represented the riding of Saint-Laurent in the National Assembly of Quebec from 2010 to 2018, and previously represented the riding of Châteauguay from 1994 to 2008. He served as the Minister of Revenue, Government House Leader, Minister of Education, Minister of Municipal Affairs, and Attorney General in the Government of Jean Charest and was the interim leader of the Quebec Liberal Party from 2012 to 2013

== Early career ==
Fournier was born in Châteauguay, Quebec. He studied at the Université de Montréal and obtained a law degree and later a master's degree in public law. He was admitted to the Barreau du Québec in 1982. He practiced law for nearly ten years. He later worked at the offices of the Ministry of Governmental Affairs, Employment and Justice.

He was also a radio host at community radio station CHAI-FM and was an organizer of the 1986 Quebec Winter Games. He was also the president of the Chateauguay Chamber of Commerce and was named Outstanding Citizen in 1987 by the city.

Prior to his entry in provincial politics, Fournier was the defeated candidate of the Liberal Party of Canada in Châteauguay in 1988 and was also involved in the leadership campaign of Paul Martin for Leader of the Liberal Party of Canada in which Jean Chrétien eventually won.

== Quebec National Assembly ==
Fournier won the 1994 election and was subsequently re-elected in the 1998, 2003 and 2007 elections. Before the Quebec Liberal Party took power in the 2003 election, Fournier at various moments served as the chief whip of the official opposition, critic for Canadian intergovernmental affairs, as well as critic for health.

After his 2003 re-election, he was named the Minister of Municipal Affairs, Sports and Recreation and from 2005 to 2007, he was the Minister of Education, Leisure and Sports for Quebec, Canada. Fournier replaced Pierre Reid in the midst of the 2005 Quebec student protests in which over 200 000 college and university students protested the Liberals cuts in bursary funds in the 2004 budget. Fournier and the students groups settled a deal in April 2005 which included involvement from the federal government and its bursary program.

On 31 October 2008, Fournier announced he would retire from politics. On 17 November 2009, it was announced Fournier would join the Office of the Leader of the Opposition, Michael Ignatieff, as principal secretary.

On 9 August 2010 it was announced that Fournier would run in a by-election in the district of Saint-Laurent to replace Jacques Dupuis, who was retiring from provincial politics. Two days later, Fournier was appointed the Minister of Justice and the Reform of Democratic Institutions by Premier Jean Charest as part of a wider cabinet shuffle, despite his not yet holding a seat in the National Assembly. He was reelected by a wide margin on 13 September 2010.

Following large student protests opposing tuition increases, Fournier supported the passage of Bill 78, a Quebec law drafted in response to the protests. After student groups vowed civil disobedience to oppose the law, Fournier declared the practice "a nice word for vandalism."

On 12 September 2012, Fournier was named interim Leader of the Quebec Liberal Party, replacing Charest.

== Electoral record (partial) ==
2003 Quebec general election: Châteauguay
Party	Candidate	Votes	%
Liberal	Jean-Marc Fournier	20,434	51.80
Parti Québécois	Éric Cardinal	13,751	34.86
Action démocratique	Daniel Lapointe	4,399	11.15
Bloc Pot	Gilles Lalumière	547	1.39
UFP	Guylaine Sirard	222	0.56
Equality	Robert Jason Morgan	93	0.24
Total valid votes		39,446	100.00
Rejected and declined votes		552	
Turnout		39,998	74.33
Electors on the lists		53,810	
Source: Official Results, Le Directeur général des élections du Québec.

Political offices
Preceded by André Boisclair	Minister of Municipal Affairs (Quebec); 2003–2005	Succeeded by Nathalie Normandeau
Preceded by Pierre Reid	Minister of Education, Leisure and Sports; 2005–2007	Succeeded by Michelle Courchesne
Preceded by Lawrence Bergman	Minister of Revenue (Quebec); 2007–2008	Succeeded by Robert Dutil
Preceded by Jacques Dupuis	Government House Leader; 2007–2008	Succeeded by Jacques Dupuis
Preceded by Kathleen Weil	Minister of Justice (Quebec); 2010–2012	Succeeded by Bertrand St-Arnaud
Preceded by Jean Charest	Leader of the Quebec Liberal Party (Interim); 2012–2013	Succeeded by Philippe Couillard
