= Port-Daniel =

Port-Daniel may refer to:

- Port-Daniel–Gascons, a municipality on the north shore of Chaleur Bay in Le Rocher-Percé Regional County Municipality, Quebec, Canada
- Petite rivière Port-Daniel, a tributary of Chaleur Bay in Quebec, Canada
- Port-Daniel River, a tributary of Chaleur Bay in Quebec, Canada
- Rivière Port-Daniel du Milieu, a tributary of Chaleur Bay in Quebec, Canada
- Port-Daniel station, an inactive railway station formerly operated by Quebec Atlantic Oriental Railway in Port-Daniel–Gascons, Quebec, Canada
