= Petite rivière Port-Daniel =

Petite rivière Port-Daniel Old name: "Rivière de l'Ouest"

Location
- Country: Canada
- Province: Quebec
- Region: Gaspésie–Îles-de-la-Madeleine
- Regional County Municipality: Bonaventure Regional County Municipality, Le Rocher-Percé Regional County Municipality

Physical characteristics
- Source: Mountain streams
  - location: Rivière-Bonaventure (Weir township)
  - coordinates: 48°15′22″N 65°10′00″W
  - elevation: 476 m (1,562 ft)
- Mouth: Chaleur Bay (via Barachois de Port-Daniel)
  - location: Port-Daniel–Gascons
  - coordinates: 48°10′43″N 64°58′13″W
  - elevation: 0 m (0 ft)
- Length: 31.0 km (19.3 mi)

Basin features
- Progression: Port-Daniel Bay, Chaleur Bay
- Tributaries
  - left: (upstream) Langlois stream, Portes de l'Enfer stream, Rankin stream, Blanc stream.
  - right: (upstream) Sellette stream, See stream.

The Petite rivière Port-Daniel (English: Little River Port-Daniel) flows in the administrative region of Gaspésie–Îles-de-la-Madeleine, Quebec, Canada. More specifically, this river successively crosses the regional county municipalities of:

- MRC of Bonaventure Regional County Municipality: the unorganized territory of Rivière-Bonaventure (township of Honorat), the municipality of Saint-Godefroi and the municipality of Shigawake;
- MRC Le Rocher-Percé Regional County Municipality: the municipality of Port-Daniel–Gascons ("Rivière-Port-Daniel" sector).

The "Petite rivière Port-Daniel" is a tributary of the bay of Port-Daniel, located on the north shore of the Chaleur Bay; the latter in turn opens eastward onto the Gulf of St. Lawrence.

== Geography ==
The "Petite rivière Port-Daniel" takes its source from mountain streams in the south-eastern part of the canton of Honorat which is part of the unorganized territory of Rivière-Bonaventure.

This source is located on the southern slope of the dividing line; the Hall River drains the West and North slopes; the rivière Port-Daniel du Milieu drains the eastern slope. The upper part of the “Petite rivière Port-Daniel” flows more or less parallel to the east side of the Hall river.

This source of the river is located at:

- 2.1 km (1.3 mi) south-west of the western limit of the township of Weir, located in the unorganized territory of Rivière-Bonaventure;
- 4.4 km (2.7 mi) north of the limit of the municipality of Shigawake;
- 1.0 km (0.62 mi) southwest of the limit of the MRC of Le Rocher-Percé Regional County Municipality;
- 18.7 km (11.6 mi) Northwest of the route 132 bridge which spans the mouth of the Petit Barachois located at the confluence of the "Petite rivière-Port- Daniel ".

From its source, the "Petite rivière Port-Daniel" flows on 31.0 km (19.3 mi) towards the south, then the east, especially in forest and mountainous areas, divided into the following segments:

Upper course of the river (segment of 12.4 km (7.7 mi))

- 5.3 km (3.3 mi) towards the south, up to the northern limit of the municipality of Saint-Godefroi;
- 0.8 km (0.50 mi) towards the south, up to the confluence of the See stream (coming from the north-west);
- 1.9 km (1.2 mi) towards the south, then towards the east, until the confluence of a stream (coming from the north);
- 1.4 km (0.87 mi) northeasterly, up to the limit of the municipality of Shigawake;
- 3.0 km (1.9 mi) towards the south-east, forming a curve towards the east, until the confluence of the brook of the Sellette (coming from the west).

Lower course of the river (segment of 18.6 km (11.6 mi))

- 1.4 km (0.87 mi) eastward, up to the confluence of a stream (coming from the southwest);
- 0.5 km (0.31 mi) eastward, up to the confluence of a stream (coming from the north);
- 2.1 km (1.3 mi) towards the east, then towards the south, until the confluence of a stream (coming from the southwest);
- 1.9 km (1.2 mi) eastward, up to the limit of the municipality of Port-Daniel–Gascons;
- 0.7 km (0.43 mi) eastward, to the confluence of Rankin Creek (coming from the north);
- 6.1 km (3.8 mi) towards the east, forming a curve towards the south, to the confluence of the Portes de l'Enfer stream (coming from the northwest);
- 1.9 km (1.2 mi) towards the east, forming a curve towards the south, until the confluence of the Langlois stream (coming from the southwest) which flows to the south of the hamlet of Clemville;
- 1.2 km (0.75 mi) towards the east, winding up to the confluence of a stream (coming from the northwest);
- 2.3 km (1.4 mi) eastward, to the Canadian National railway bridge which is located on the northwest shore of a small barachois;
- 0.5 km (0.31 mi) eastward, to the mouth of the Petit Barachois, the mouth of which is delimited by the route 132.

This small barachois empties on the northeast side into the "Baie de Port-Daniel" passing under the bridge of route 132, which opens towards the South-East in the Chaleur Bay. This bay, the width of which at the opening is 2.8 km (1.7 mi), is delimited by the "Cap de la Vieille" (on the east side) and by the Pointe du Sud-Ouest.

The confluence of the river is located on the north side of the village of Port-Daniel-Center, on the southwest side of the village of Port-Daniel-Est and to the southwest of the barachois of Rivière-Port-Daniel.

== Toponymy ==
The toponym "Petite rivière Port-Daniel" was made official on December 5, 1968, at the Commission de toponymie du Québec.
