= Angers River =

- Location within Quebec

Location
- Country: Canada
- Province: Quebec
- Region: Gaspésie-Îles-de-la-Madeleine
- Regional County Municipality: Bonaventure Regional County Municipality
- City: Rivière-Bonaventure (township d'Angers)

Physical characteristics
- Source: Mountain streams
  - location: Rivière-Bonaventure (township d'Angers)
  - coordinates: 48.306997°N 66.103917°E
  - elevation: 499
- Mouth: Cascapédia River
  - location: Rivière-Bonaventure (township d'Angers)
  - coordinates: 48.30722°N 65.96278°W
  - elevation: 16 m (52 ft)
- Length: 35.3 km (21.9 mi)
- Discharge
  - location: Rivière-Bonaventure (township d'Angers)

Basin features
- Tributaries
  - left: (from the mouth) Ruisseau Grand Nord, Ruisseau du Petit Nord, Ruisseau Argument.
  - right: (from the mouth) Ruisseau du Contentieux, Rivière Angers Sud.

The Rivière Angers flows entirely in the township of Angers, in the unorganized territory of Rivière-Bonaventure, in Bonaventure Regional County Municipality, in the administrative region of Gaspésie-Îles-de-la-Madeleine, in Quebec, in Canada.

The Angers river flows northeast, then east into a forest area in a narrow plain bordered by mountains. Its lower part runs parallel to the north shore of the Chaleur Bay (French: La Baie-des-Chaleurs). The Angers river flows on the west bank of the Cascapedia River. The latter flows south to the north shore of Chaleur Bay which opens east to the Gulf of St. Lawrence.

== Geography ==
The hydrographic slopes neighboring the Angers river are:

- North side: Argument stream;
- East side: Cascapedia River;
- South side: Stewart River;
- West side: McCarthy Brook, Mann Brook.

The Angers river takes its source at 499 m (1,637 ft) of altitude in mountainous and forested area. This source is located at:

- 0.5 km (0.31 mi) West of the limit of the unorganized territory of Rivière-Nouvelle;
- 3.6 km (2.2 mi) North of the city limit of Carleton-sur-Mer (MRC of Avignon Regional County Municipality);
- 3.5 km (2.2 mi) North of the limit of the north shore of the Chaleur Bay.

From its source, the Angers river flows over 35.3 km (21.9 mi), according to the following segments:

- 15.3 km (9.5 mi) towards the North-East by meandering in mountains, until the confluence of the Angers South River (coming from the South);
- 1.7 km (1.1 mi) north, to the confluence of Argument stream (coming from the West);
- 1.9 km (1.2 mi) towards the North-East, up to the confluence of the "Petit Nord stream" (coming from the North-West);
- 5.4 km (3.4 mi) towards the East, up to the confluence of the "Grand Nord stream";
- 0.5 km (0.31 mi) towards the South-East, until the confluence of the "Litigation brook" (coming from the South);
- 5.4 km (3.4 mi) towards the East, up to the confluence of the "Grand Nord stream";
- 5.1 km (3.2 mi) eastwards, to the confluence of the river.

The Angers river flows on the west bank of the Cascapedia River at the limit of the cantons of Angers and Maria. This confluence is located at:

- 7.7 km (4.8 mi) North-West of the center of the village of Saint-Jules-de-Cascapédia;
- 7.2 km (4.5 mi) upstream from Île du Cheval, located on the Cascapedia River;
- 12.1 km (7.5 mi) northwest of the route 132 bridge located near the confluence of the Cascapedia River.

== Toponymy ==
The toponym "Rivière Angers" was formalized on December 5, 1968, at the Commission de toponymie du Québec.

== See also ==
- Cascapedia River
- Chaleur Bay
- Rivière-Bonaventure, an unorganized territory
- Bonaventure Regional County Municipality
- List of rivers of Quebec
