= Rivière Port-Daniel du Milieu =

Port-Daniel du Milieu River
- Location within Quebec

Location
- Country: Canada
- Province: Quebec
- Region: Gaspésie–Îles-de-la-Madeleine
- Regional County Municipality: Bonaventure Regional County Municipality, Le Rocher-Percé Regional County Municipality

Physical characteristics
- Source: Mountain streams
  - location: Rivière-Bonaventure
  - coordinates: 48°17′15″N 65°07′57″W
  - elevation: 486 m (1,594 ft)
- Mouth: Le Barrachois de Rivière-Port-Daniel, Chaleur Bay
  - location: Port-Daniel–Gascons
  - coordinates: 47°11′49″N 64°58′32″W
  - elevation: 0 m (0 ft)
- Length: 24.6 km (15.3 mi)

Basin features
- Progression: Port-Daniel Bay, Chaleur Bay
- Tributaries
  - left: (upstream) Grum stream, Neckwick stream, discharge from "La Chaîne de Lacs".
  - right: (upstream) Dubuc Creek.

The Rivière Port-Daniel du Milieu flows in the administrative region of Gaspésie–Îles-de-la-Madeleine, Quebec, Canada. More specifically, this river crosses successively:

- the southern part of the unorganized territory of Rivière-Bonaventure (township of Weir), in the Bonaventure Regional County Municipality; and
- the municipality of Port-Daniel–Gascons , in the MRC Le Rocher-Percé Regional County Municipality.

The "Rivière Port-Daniel du Milieu" is a tributary of the north shore of the barachois of the hamlet of "Rivière-Port-Daniel" which opens to the south in the bay of Port-Daniel, located on the North shore of Chaleur Bay; the latter in turn opens eastward onto the Gulf of St. Lawrence.

== Geography ==
The "Port-Daniel du Milieu river" takes its source from mountain streams in the southwest part of the township of Weir which is part of the unorganized territory of Rivière-Bonaventure. This source is located on the southern slope of the dividing line; Edgar brook (tributary of Nadeau brook) draining the north slope. The upper part of the “Rivière Port-Daniel du Milieu” flows more or less parallel to the east side of the Petite rivière Port-Daniel.

This source of the river is located at:

- 1.9 km (1.2 mi) east of the eastern limit of the township of Honorat, located in the unorganized territory of Rivière-Bonaventure;
- 4.5 km (2.8 mi) north of the limit of the township of Port-Daniel, located in the municipality of Port-Daniel–Gascons;
- 17.4 km (10.8 mi) Northwest of the Canadian National railway bridge which spans the mouth of the "Bacharois de Rivière-Port-Daniel".

From its source, the "Rivière Port-Daniel du Milieu" flows on 24.6 km (15.3 mi) towards the South, then the South-East, especially in forest and mountainous areas, divided into the following segments:

- 3.8 km (2.4 mi) towards the South, forming a curve towards the East, until the confluence of the creek of the discharge of "La Chaine de Lacs" (coming from the East);
- 2.8 km (1.7 mi) southward, up to the limit of the municipality of Port-Daniel–Gascons;
- 5.0 km (3.1 mi) towards the south-east, up to the confluence of a stream (coming from the north-west);
- 4.2 km (2.6 mi) towards the south-east, collecting several streams, up to the confluence of a stream (coming from the west);
- 1.4 km (0.87 mi) towards the south-east, until the confluence of the Dubuc stream (coming from the south-west);
- 6.4 km (4.0 mi) towards the south-east, winding up to the confluence of the Grum stream (coming from the north);
- 1.0 km (0.62 mi) south-east to the confluence of the river.

The “Rivière Port-Daniel du Milieu” flows onto the north bank of the barachois in the hamlet of “Rivière-Port-Daniel du Milieu”, crossing the sandstone at low tide. This barachois is delimited on the east side by the “Pointe à la Croix” and on the south side by a jetty which juts out towards the north-east. These two strips of land are linked by the Canadian National railway bridge and by route 132.

This barachois empties on the south-east side into the "Baie de Port-Daniel du Milieu", which opens towards the south-east into Chaleur Bay. This bay, the width of which at the opening is 2.8 km (1.7 mi), is delimited by the "Cap de la Vieille" (on the east side) and by the Pointe du Sud-Ouest.

The confluence of the river is located:

- on the west side of the hamlet of “Rivière-Port-Daniel”;
- at 0.4 km (0.25 mi) southwest of the confluence of the Port-Daniel River;
- at 1.8 km (1.1 mi) north-west of the Canadian National railway bridge spanning the mouth of the barachois in the hamlet of “Rivière-Port-Daniel du Milieu”.

== Toponymy ==
The toponym "Rivière Port-Daniel du Milieu" was made official on December 5, 1968, at the Commission de toponymie du Québec.
