= Saint-Siméon, Gaspésie–Îles-de-la-Madeleine =

Saint-Siméon
- Parish municipality
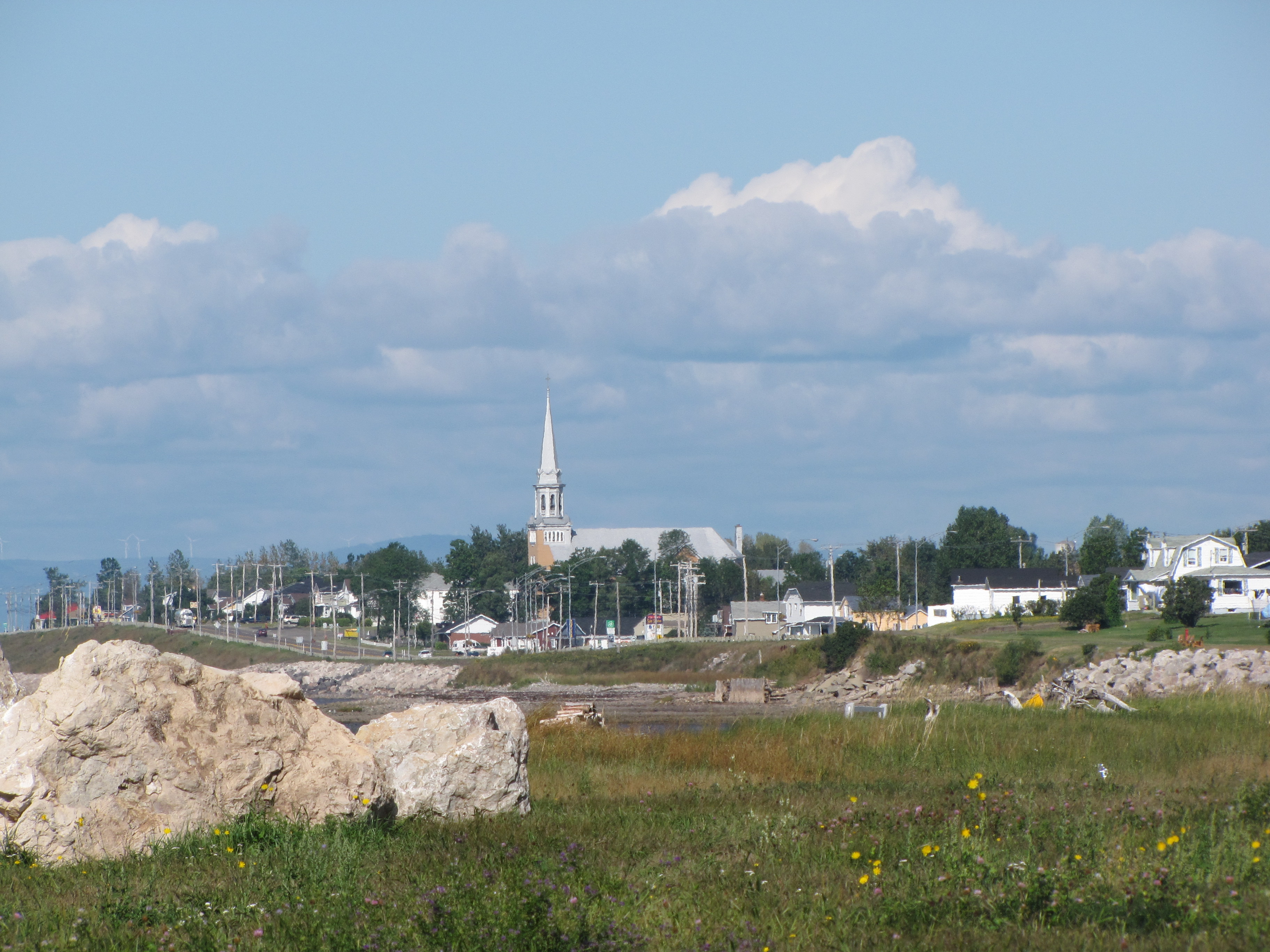

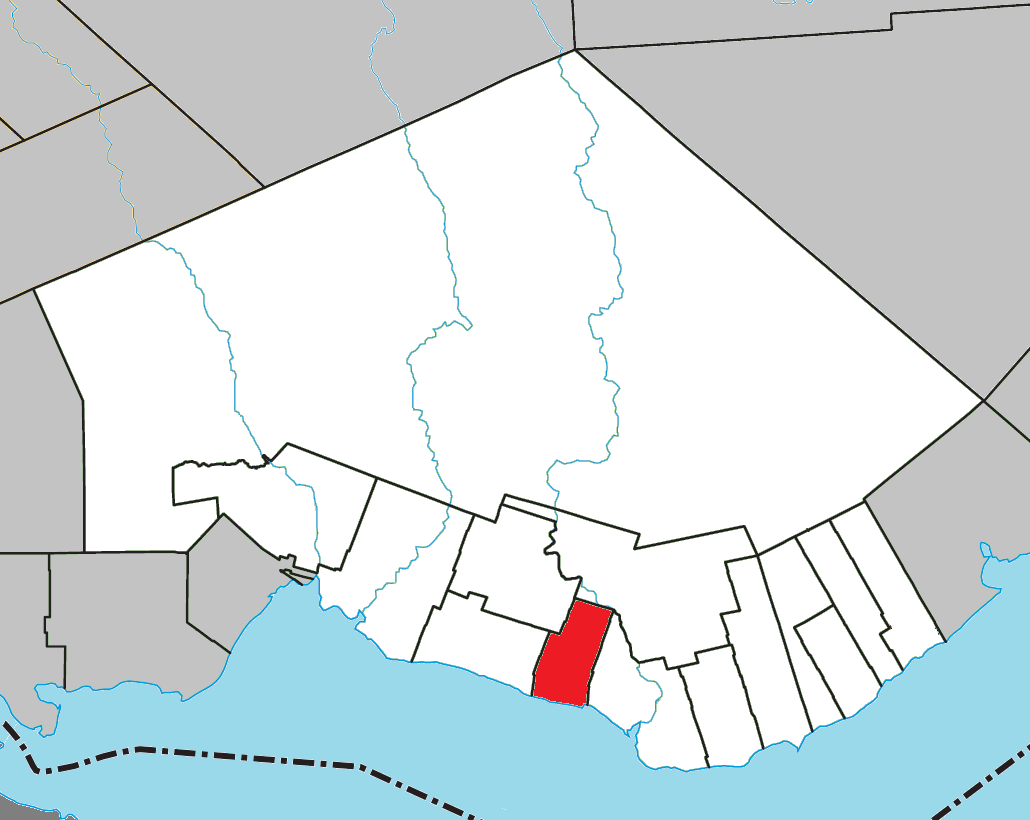
- Location within Bonaventure RCM

- Location in eastern Quebec
- Coordinates: 48°04′N 65°34′W
- Country: Canada
- Province: Quebec
- Region: Gaspésie– Îles-de-la-Madeleine
- RCM: Bonaventure
- Settled: 1760
- Constituted: October 29, 1914

Government
  - Mayor: Denis Gauthier
  - Federal riding: Gaspésie—Les Îles-de-la-Madeleine—Listuguj
  - Prov. riding: Bonaventure

Area
  - Total: 56.793 km^{2} (21.928 sq mi)
  - Land: 56.71 km^{2} (21.90 sq mi)

Population (2021)
  - Total: 1,207
  - Density: 21.3/km^{2} (55/sq mi)
  - Pop (2016-21): ▲3.1%
  - Dwellings: 606
- Time zone: UTC−5 (EST)
  - Summer (DST): UTC−4 (EDT)
- Postal code(s): G0C 3A0
- Area codes: 418 and 581
- Highways: R-132
- Website: www.stsimeon.ca

Saint-Siméon (French pronunciation: [sɛ̃ simeɔ̃]) is a parish municipality in Quebec, Canada. It is also sometimes called Saint-Siméon-de-Bonaventure to avoid confusion with Saint-Siméon in the Capitale-Nationale region.

== History ==
In 1913, with the means of transport of the time making it difficult to reach the church in Saint-Bonaventure-de-Hamilton, a community of citizens living to the west of the parish asked the religious authorities of the diocese for permission to found a new parish. On 21 November 1913, a request was made and taken into consideration.

Bishop André-Albert Blais approved the move and on March 1, 1914, the first council of churchwardens of the parish of Saint-Siméon was formed. The Municipality of Saint-Siméon was officially created in November 1914.

On August 6, 1924, the eastern part of the parish of Saint-Charles-de-Caplan, extending from the Ruisseau-Leblanc bridge to Route Roussel, was transferred to Saint-Siméon.

Saint-Siméon has seen its population grow as it has developed its territory and set up various services, making it an attractive place to live. With nearly 1,200 residents, many of the area's families are of Acadian origin.

== Demographics ==
In the 2021 Census of Population conducted by Statistics Canada, Saint-Siméon had a population of 1,207 living in 576 of its 606 total private dwellings, a change of 3.1% from its 2016 population of 1,171. With a land area of 56.71 km^{2} (21.90 sq mi), it had a population density of 21.3/km^{2} (55.1/sq mi) in 2021.

Canada census – Saint-Siméon community profile

	2021	2016	2011
Population	1,207 (+3.1% from 2016)	1,171 (-0.7% from 2011)	1,179 (+0.4% from 2006)
Land area	56.71 km^{2} (21.90 sq mi)	56.87 km^{2} (21.96 sq mi)	56.37 km^{2} (21.76 sq mi)
Population density	21.3/km^{2} (55/sq mi)	20.6/km^{2} (53/sq mi)	20.9/km^{2} (54/sq mi)
Median age	53.2 (M: 52.8, F: 53.6)	50.5 (M: 50.8, F: 50.0)	49.0 (M: 48.6, F: 49.3)
Private dwellings	606 (total) 576 (occupied)	590 (total)	567 (total)
Median household income	$68,000	$54,443	$49,377

Notes: 2011 income data for this area has been suppressed for data quality or confidentiality reasons.
References: 2021 2016 2011

Historical Census Data - Saint-Siméon, Quebec

Year	Pop.	±%
1921	942	—
1931	1,222	+29.7%
1941	1,308	+7.0%
1951	1,372	+4.9%
1956	1,615	+17.7%
1961	1,528	−5.4%

Year	Pop.	±%
1966	1,604	+5.0%
1971	1,544	−3.7%
1976	1,468	−4.9%
1981	1,387	−5.5%
1986	1,304	−6.0%
1991	1,288	−1.2%

Year	Pop.	±%
1996	1,211	−6.0%
2001	1,211	+0.0%
2006	1,174	−3.1%
2011	1,179	+0.4%
2016	1,171	−0.7%
2021	1,207	+3.1%

Source: Statistics Canada

== See also ==
- List of parish municipalities in Quebec
