= Port-Daniel River =

Location
- Country: Canada
- Province: Quebec
- Region: Gaspésie–Îles-de-la-Madeleine
- Regional County Municipality: Bonaventure Regional County Municipality, Le Rocher-Percé Regional County Municipality

Physical characteristics
- Source: Mountain streams
  - location: Rivière-Bonaventure (Weir township)
  - coordinates: 48°23′23″N 65°12′38″W
  - elevation: 428 m (1,404 ft)
- Mouth: Chaleur Bay (via Barachois de Port-Daniel)
  - location: Port-Daniel–Gascons
  - coordinates: 48°10′57″N 64°57′49″W
  - elevation: 0 m (0 ft)
- Length: 30.7 km (19.1 mi)

Basin features
- Progression: Port-Daniel Bay, Chaleur Bay
- Tributaries
  - left: (upstream) Stream of Lac à la Pelle, discharge of lac Gillis, discharge of lac Marguerite.
  - right: (upstream) Discharge of Lac du Pain de Sucre, Grande Fourche stream, Nadeau stream, Grand Ravin stream, Ravin Vert stream.

The Rivière Port-Daniel flows in the administrative region of Gaspésie–Îles-de-la-Madeleine, Quebec, Canada. More specifically, this river crosses successively:

- the southern part of the unorganized territory of Rivière-Bonaventure (township of Weir), in the Bonaventure Regional County Municipality; and
- the municipality of Port-Daniel–Gascons ("Rivière-Port-Daniel" sector), in the MRC Le Rocher-Percé Regional County Municipality.

The "Rivière Port-Daniel" is a tributary of the north shore of the barachois of the hamlet of "Rivière-Port-Daniel" which opens to the south in the bay of Port-Daniel, located on the north shore of the Chaleur Bay; the latter in turn opens eastward onto the Gulf of St. Lawrence.

== Geography ==
The "Port-Daniel river" takes its source from mountain streams in the northwestern part of the township of Weir which is part of the unorganized territory of Rivière-Bonaventure. Its source is located on the eastern slope of the dividing line; McCrea Creek drains the North Slope and the Grand Pabos West River the Northeast Slope. The upper part of the “Port-Daniel River” flows more or less parallel to the south side of McCallum Creek and the Grand Pabos River.

This source of the river is located at:

- 2.3 km (1.4 mi) south-east of the southern limit of Canton de Guéguen, located in the unorganized territory of Bonaventure River;
- 2.5 km (1.6 mi) northeast of the eastern limit of the township of Honorat, located in the unorganized territory of Bonaventure River;
- 1.0 km (0.62 mi) southwest of the limit of the MRC of Le Rocher-Percé Regional County Municipality;
- 3.5 km (2.2 mi) Northwest of the Canadian National railway bridge which spans the mouth of the "Bacharois de Rivière-Port-Daniel".

From its source, the "Rivière Port-Daniel" flows on 30.7 km (19.1 mi) towards the East, then the South-East, especially in forest and mountainous areas, divided into the following segments:

Upper course of the river (segment of 14.6 km (9.1 mi))

- 7.1 km (4.4 mi) towards the south-east, up to the confluence of the Ravin Vert stream (coming from the west);
- 3.1 km (1.9 mi) towards the south-east, up to the confluence of the Grand Ravin stream (coming from the north-west);
- 1.3 km (0.81 mi) towards the south-east, to the confluence of the Nadeau stream (coming from the west);
- 3.1 km (1.9 mi) towards the south-east, to the limit of the former municipality of Port-Daniel (now designated Port-Daniel–Gascons).

Intermediate course of the river (forming the western limit of the Réserve faunique de Port-Daniel) (9.2 km (5.7 mi))

- 5.6 km (3.5 mi) towards the south-east, up to the outlet of Lac Marguerite (coming from the north-east);
- 0.3 km (0.19 mi) towards the south-east, in the "Port-Daniel" sector, to the outlet of Lac Gillis (coming from the east);
- 3.3 km (2.1 mi) towards the South-East, up to the South-West limit of the Réserve faunique de Port-Daniel;

Lower course of the river (segment of 6.9 km (4.3 mi))

- 3.5 km (2.2 mi) towards the South, forming a curve towards the East, until the confluence of the Lac à la Pelle stream (coming from the North-East);
- 3.4 km (2.1 mi) towards the southwest, to the confluence of the river.

The Rivière Port-Daniel flows onto the north shore of the barachois in the hamlet of Rivière-Port-Daniel, crossing the sandstone at low tide. This barachois is bounded on the east side by the Pointe à la Croix and on the south side by a jetty which juts out towards the northeast. These two strips of land are linked by the Canadian National railway bridge and by route 132.

This barachois empties on the south-east side into the “Baie de Port-Daniel”, which opens towards the south-east into Chaleur Bay. This bay, the width of which at the opening is 2.8 km (1.7 mi), is delimited by the "Cap de la Vieille" (on the east side) and by the Pointe du Sud-Ouest.

The confluence of the Port-Daniel river is located:

- on the west side of the hamlet Rivière-Port-Daniel;
- at 0.4 km (0.25 mi) northeast of the confluence of the Rivière Port-Daniel du Milieu;
- at 1.8 km (1.1 mi) northwest of the Canadian National railway bridge spanning the mouth of the barachois in the hamlet of Rivière-Port-Daniel.

== Toponymy ==
The toponym “Rivière Port-Daniel” was made official on January 21, 1975, at the Commission de toponymie du Québec.
