= List of township municipalities in Quebec =

This is a list of municipalities that have the Quebec municipal type township municipality, an administrative division defined by the Ministry of Municipal Affairs, Regions and Land Occupancy.

== Township municipalities ==
(area is in km², population as of 2021)

Name	RCM	Region	Area	Population
Amherst	Les Laurentides	Laurentides	227.86	1,728
Arundel	Les Laurentides	Laurentides	63.45	578
Aumond	La Vallée-de-la-Gatineau	Outaouais	212.82	754
Bedford	Brome-Missisquoi	Estrie	31.96	658
Chichester	Pontiac	Outaouais	218.74	350
Clermont	Abitibi-Ouest	Abitibi-Témiscamingue	156.66	484
Cleveland	Le Val-Saint-François	Estrie	126.59	1,581
Cloridorme	La Côte-de-Gaspé	Gaspésie–Îles-de-la-Madeleine	158.74	607
Dundee	Le Haut-Saint-Laurent	Montérégie	68.41	386
Godmanchester	Le Haut-Saint-Laurent	Montérégie	138.66	1,403
Gore	Argenteuil	Laurentides	90.04	2,283
Guérin	Témiscamingue	Abitibi-Témiscamingue	188.52	333
Ham-Nord	Arthabaska	Centre-du-Québec	103.98	857
Hampden	Le Haut-Saint-François	Estrie	111.68	193
Harrington	Argenteuil	Laurentides	233.65	967
Hatley	Memphrémagog	Estrie	71.60	2,230
Havelock	Le Haut-Saint-Laurent	Montérégie	88.70	756
Hemmingford	Les Jardins-de-Napierville	Montérégie	157.22	1,995
Hope	Bonaventure	Gaspésie–Îles-de-la-Madeleine	70.55	584
Landrienne	Abitibi	Abitibi-Témiscamingue	275.93	897
Launay	Abitibi	Abitibi-Témiscamingue	257.80	211
Lingwick	Le Haut-Saint-François	Estrie	243.01	456
Lochaber	Papineau	Outaouais	62.14	446
Lochaber-Partie-Ouest	Papineau	Outaouais	57.39	926
Low	La Vallée-de-la-Gatineau	Outaouais	257.78	1,020
Marston	Le Granit	Estrie	71.83	777
Melbourne	Le Val-Saint-François	Estrie	173.93	1,096
Nédélec	Témiscamingue	Abitibi-Témiscamingue	371.49	340
Orford	Memphrémagog	Estrie	136.14	5,007
Potton	Memphrémagog	Estrie	260.77	2,012
Roxton	Acton	Montérégie	148.93	1,115
Saint-Camille	Les Sources	Estrie	83.10	551
Saint-Godefroi	Bonaventure	Gaspésie–Îles-de-la-Madeleine	63.57	350
Sainte-Edwidge-de-Clifton	Coaticook	Estrie	101.84	546
Shefford	La Haute-Yamaska	Estrie	117.99	7,253
Stanstead	Memphrémagog	Estrie	113.20	1,148
Stratford	Le Granit	Estrie	119,86	1,036
Trécesson	Abitibi	Abitibi-Témiscamingue	196.89	1,232
Valcourt	Le Val-Saint-François	Estrie	80.39	1,029
Wentworth	Argenteuil	Laurentides	85.03	682
Westbury	Le Haut-Saint-François	Estrie	55.61	1,097

The last previous township municipalities were:

- Ristigouche-Partie-Sud-Est, which changed its status to an ordinary municipality and its name to Ristigouche-Sud-Est on March 9, 2024;
- Natashquan, which changed its status to an ordinary municipality on June 18, 2016;
- Maddington, which changed its status to an ordinary municipality and its name to Maddington Falls on June 20, 2015;
- Hinchinbrooke, which changed its status to an ordinary municipality on November 5, 2011;
- Sainte-Cécile-de-Milton, which changed its status to an ordinary municipality on April 4, 2009;

== See also ==
- List of united township municipalities in Quebec
- Eastern Townships
