= Saint-Alphonse, Quebec =

Saint-Alphonse
- Municipality
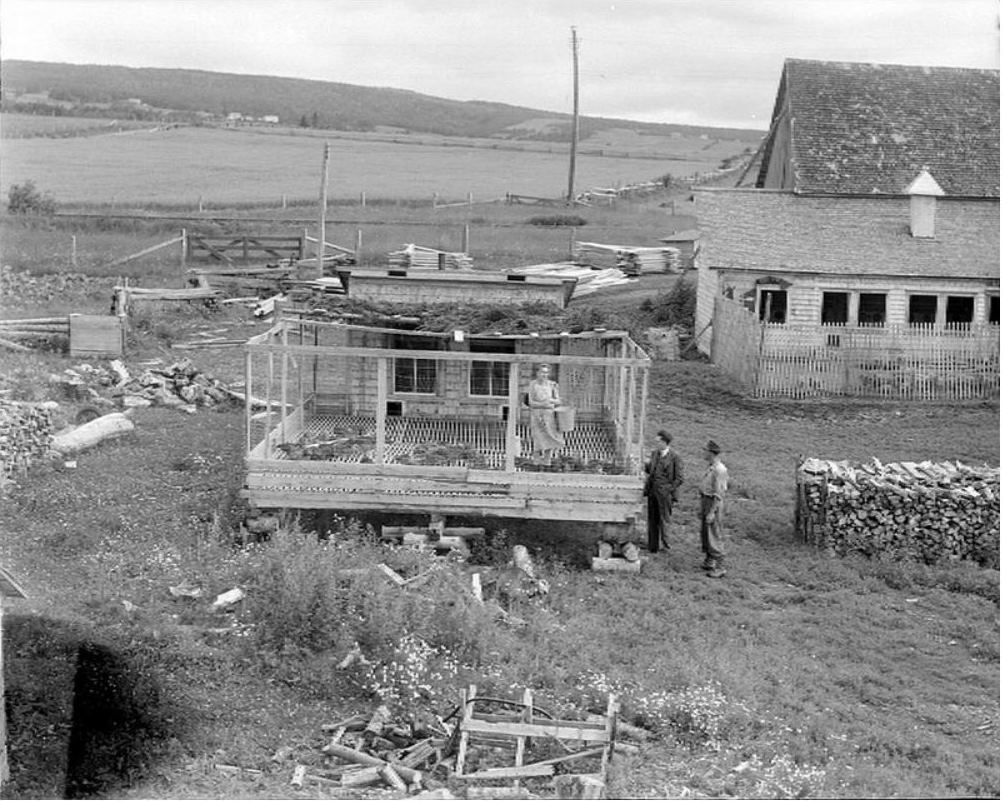

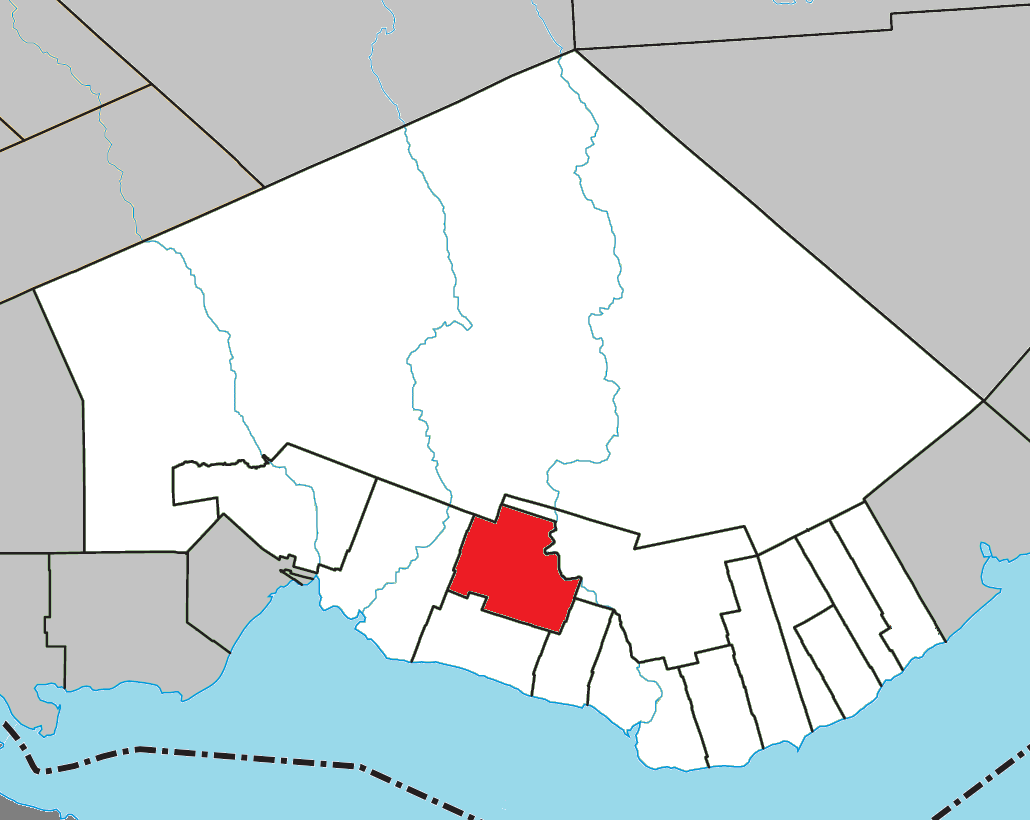
- Location within Bonaventure RCM

- Location in eastern Quebec
- Coordinates: 48°11′N 65°38′W
- Country: Canada
- Province: Quebec
- Region: Gaspésie– Îles-de-la-Madeleine
- RCM: Bonaventure
- Settled: 1890s
- Constituted: May 9, 1902

Government
  - Mayor: Josiane Appleby
  - Federal riding: Gaspésie—Les Îles-de-la-Madeleine—Listuguj
  - Prov. riding: Bonaventure

Area
  - Total: 112.17 km^{2} (43.31 sq mi)
  - Land: 112.09 km^{2} (43.28 sq mi)

Population (2021)
  - Total: 711
  - Density: 6.3/km^{2} (16/sq mi)
  - Pop (2016-21): ▲1.7%
  - Dwellings: 325
- Time zone: UTC−5 (EST)
  - Summer (DST): UTC−4 (EDT)
- Postal code(s): G0C 2V0
- Area codes: 418 and 581
- Website: www.st-alphonsegaspesie.com

Saint-Alphonse (French pronunciation: [sɛ̃t‿alfɔ̃s]) is a municipality in Quebec, Canada.

== History ==
Colonization of the place began at the end of the 19th century, when Henri-Joseph Mussely (a Belgian Catholic priest) arrived there, along with about 20 Belgian families. They founded the parish of Saint-Alphonse-de-Liguori in 1891, named after Alphonsus Liguori since Mussely was a Redemptorist. The place was originally known as La Petite-Belgique (French for "Little Belgium"), but the Belgian families did not remain long due to the harsh climate and short growing season, replaced by people from around Chaleur Bay.

In 1901, its post office opened under the name Saint-Alphonse-de-Caplan, referring to the parish name and its proximity to Caplan. The following year, the Municipality of Musselyville was created out of territory ceded by Township of New Richmond and the Parish Municipality of Saint-Bonaventure de Hamilton.

On October 24, 1953, the municipality changed its name from Musselyville to Saint-Alphonse.

== Demographics ==
Canada census – Saint-Alphonse community profile

	2021	2016	2011
Population	711 (+1.7% from 2016)	699 (+1.2% from 2011)	691 (-5.5% from 2006)
Land area	112.09 km^{2} (43.28 sq mi)	112.07 km^{2} (43.27 sq mi)	112.38 km^{2} (43.39 sq mi)
Population density	6.3/km^{2} (16/sq mi)	6.2/km^{2} (16/sq mi)	6.1/km^{2} (16/sq mi)
Median age	47.6 (M: 46.0, F: 50.0)	49.7 (M: 48.0, F: 51.4)	48.2 (M: 48.1, F: 48.2)
Private dwellings	325 (total) 314 (occupied)	330 (total)	320 (total)
Median household income	$69,000	$56,704	$54,345

References: 2021 2016 2011

Historical Census Data - Saint-Alphonse, Quebec

Year	Pop.	±%
1911	630	—
1931	657	+4.3%
1941	859	+30.7%
1951	946	+10.1%
1956	1,029	+8.8%
1961	1,037	+0.8%

Year	Pop.	±%
1966	1,035	−0.2%
1971	1,042	+0.7%
1976	1,008	−3.3%
1981	946	−6.2%
1986	918	−3.0%
1991	869	−5.3%

Year	Pop.	±%
1996	866	−0.3%
2001	755	−12.8%
2006	731	−3.2%
2011	691	−5.5%
2016	699	+1.2%
2021	711	+1.7%

Source: Statistics Canada

== Local government ==
List of former mayors:

- Narcisse Cyr (1902–1907)
- Albert Dugas (1907–1921, 1923–1925)
- Pierre Leblanc (1921–1923)
- Victor Onraet (1925–1927)
- Bernard Arsenault (1927–1933, 1941–1951)
- Ulfranc Audet (1933–1935)
- Edmond Cyr (1935–1937)
- Antoine Barriault (1937–1941)
- Jean Baptiste Bélanger (1951–1955, 1957–1975)
- Mathias St-Onge (1955–1957)
- Léonce Dugas (1975–1979)
- Philippe Bujold (1979–1983)
- Marius Cellard (1983–1993)
- Bertin St-Onge (1993–2001)
- Odilon Bélanger (2001–2002)
- Gérard Porlier (2002–2021)
- Josiane Appleby (2021–present)

== See also ==
- List of municipalities in Quebec
