= Hope, Quebec =

Hope
- Township municipality
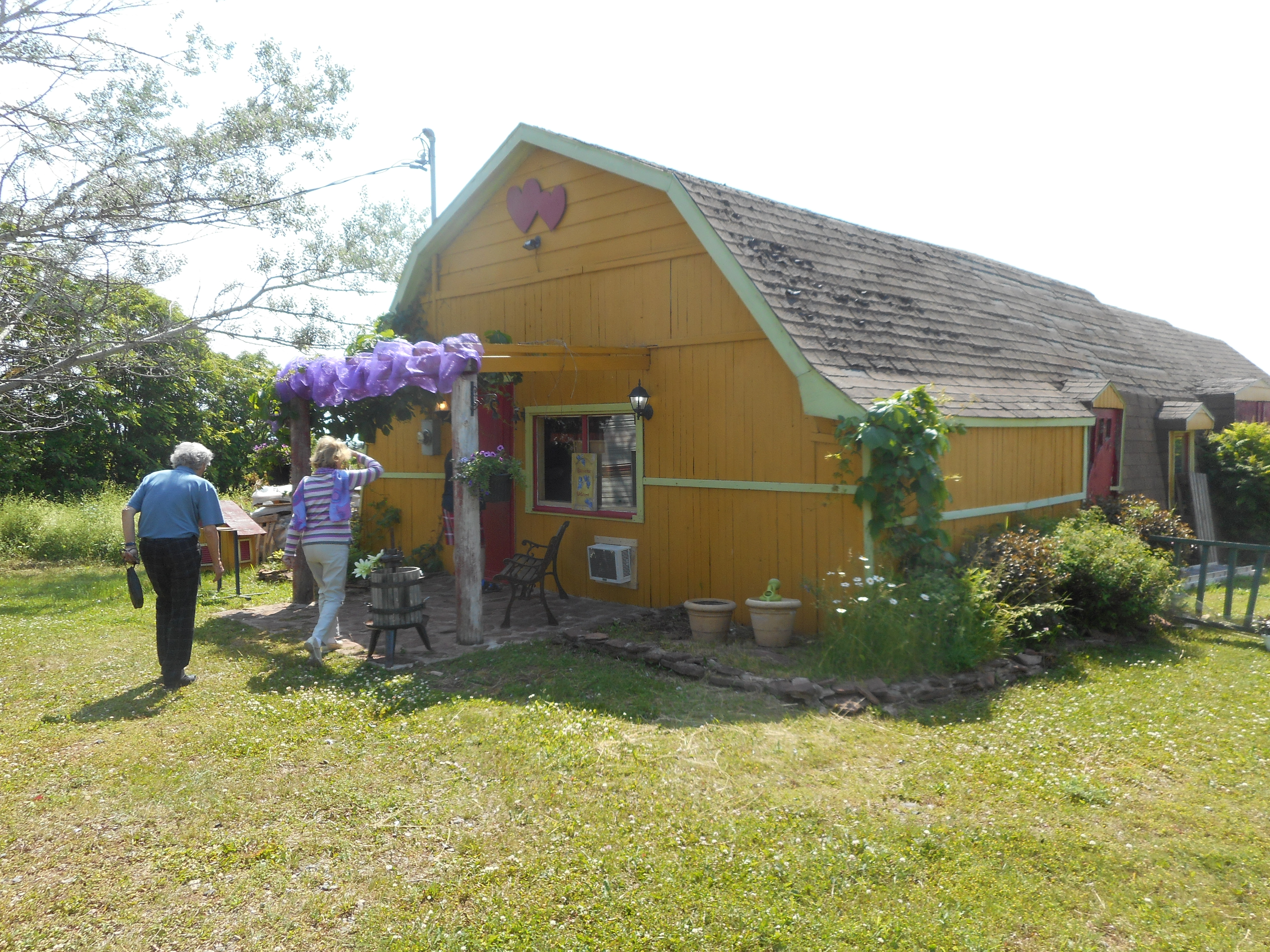
- Winery Le Plein d'amour

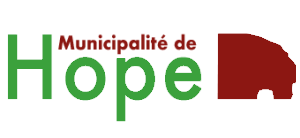
- Seal

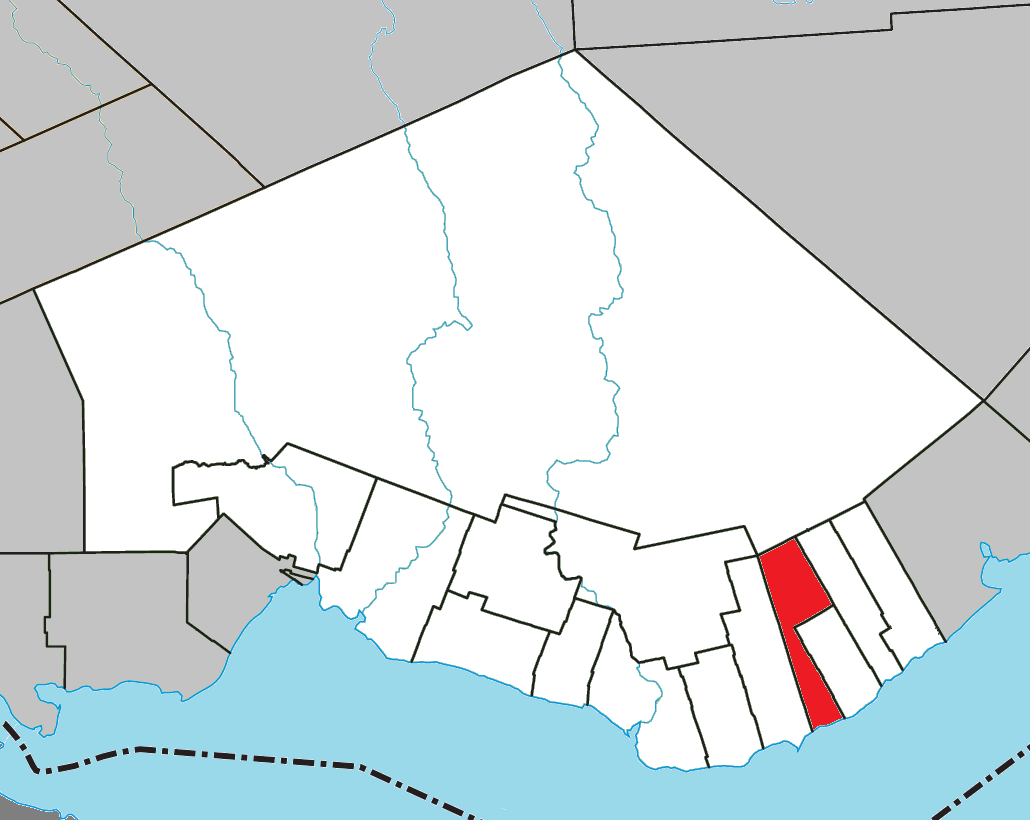
- Location within Bonaventure RCM

- Location in eastern Quebec
- Coordinates: 48°03′N 65°12′W
- Country: Canada
- Province: Quebec
- Region: Gaspésie– Îles-de-la-Madeleine
- RCM: Bonaventure
- Constituted: July 1, 1855
- Named for: Henry Hope

Government
  - Mayor: Hazen Whittom
  - Federal riding: Gaspésie—Les Îles-de-la-Madeleine—Listuguj
  - Prov. riding: Bonaventure

Area
  - Total: 71.17 km^{2} (27.48 sq mi)
  - Land: 70.55 km^{2} (27.24 sq mi)

Population (2021)
  - Total: 584
  - Density: 8.3/km^{2} (21/sq mi)
  - Pop (2016-21): ▲2.8%
  - Dwellings: 320
- Time zone: UTC−5 (EST)
  - Summer (DST): UTC−4 (EDT)
- Postal code(s): G0C 2K0
- Area codes: 418 and 581
- Highways: R-132
- Website: www.municipalitedehope.ca

Hope is a township municipality in the Canadian province of Quebec, located within the Bonaventure Regional County Municipality. Its population was 584 in the 2021 Canadian census.

The only population centres within the township are Saint-Jogues (48°10′30″N 65°15′03″W) and Saint-Jogues-Sud (48°08′54″N 65°13′53″W).

== History ==
The township was surveyed circa 1786, and named in honour of British Colonel Henry Hope (c. 1746 – 1789), lieutenant-governor of Quebec from 1785 to 1789. At that time, the township also included the territory of Hope Town, Paspébiac, and Saint-Godefroi.

In 1913, Saint-Godefroi split off, and in 1936, Hope Town became a separate incorporated municipality.

The community of Saint-Jogues was formed in 1930 when 52 settlers were encouraged to colonize Gaspésie's interior during the Great Depression. By 1937, there were 300 residents in this village.

== Demographics ==
In the 2021 Census of Population conducted by Statistics Canada, Hope had a population of 584 living in 289 of its 320 total private dwellings, a change of 2.8% from its 2016 population of 568. With a land area of 70.55 km^{2} (27.24 sq mi), it had a population density of 8.3/km^{2} (21.4/sq mi) in 2021.

Canada census – Hope community profile

	2021	2016	2011
Population	584 (+2.8% from 2016)	568 (-9.8% from 2011)	630 (-13.5% from 2006)
Land area	70.55 km^{2} (27.24 sq mi)	70.55 km^{2} (27.24 sq mi)	70.49 km^{2} (27.22 sq mi)
Population density	8.3/km^{2} (21/sq mi)	8.1/km^{2} (21/sq mi)	8.9/km^{2} (23/sq mi)
Median age	60.0 (M: 59.6, F: 60.0)	58.7 (M: 56.8, F: 60.7)	55.7 (M: 54.4, F: 56.9)
Private dwellings	320 (total) 289 (occupied)	308 (total)	299 (total)
Median household income	$56,000	$47,360	$50,662

Notes: Includes corrections and updates for 2006.
References: 2021 2016 2011

Historical Census Data - Hope, Quebec

Year	Pop.	±%
1861	992	—
1871	1,459	+47.1%
1881	1,824	+25.0%
1891	2,114	+15.9%
1901	2,411	+14.0%
1911	2,101	−12.9%
1921	1,170	−44.3%
1931	1,212	+3.6%

Year	Pop.	±%
1941	1,046	−13.7%
1951	1,286	+22.9%
1956	1,395	+8.5%
1961	1,270	−9.0%
1966	1,179	−7.2%
1971	1,210	+2.6%
1976	1,100	−9.1%
1981	979	−11.0%

Year	Pop.	±%
1986	934	−4.6%
1991	857	−8.2%
1996	822	−4.1%
2001	746	−9.2%
2006	728	−2.4%
2011	630	−13.5%
2016	568	−9.8%
2021	584	+2.8%

Population counts are not adjusted for boundary changes.
Source: Statistics Canada

Mother tongue (2021):

- English as first language: 14.7%
- French as first language: 83.6%
- English and French as first language: 1.7%
- Other as first language: 0.0%

== See also ==
- List of anglophone communities in Quebec
- List of township municipalities in Quebec
