= Hope Town, Quebec =

Hope Town
- Municipality
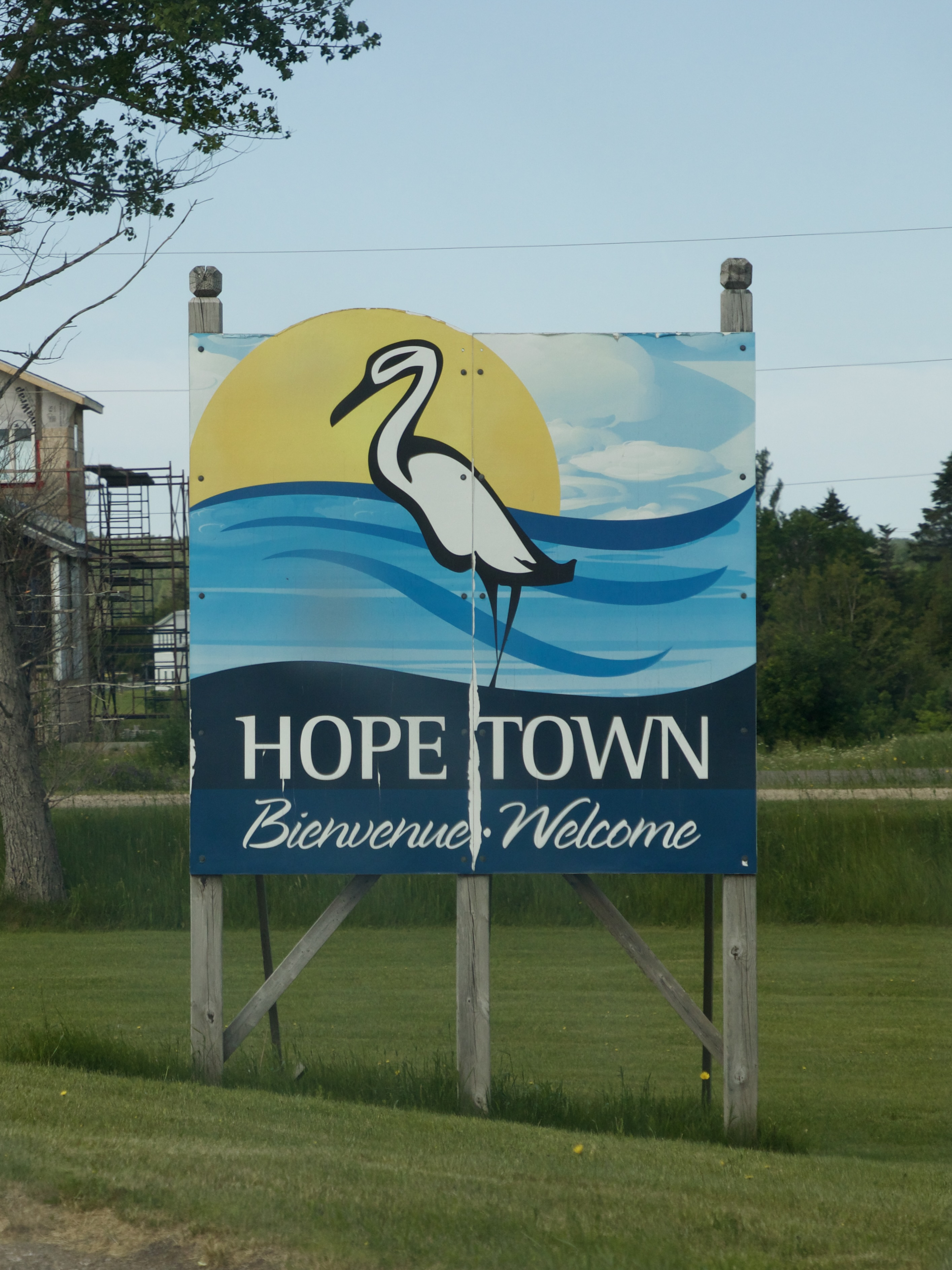
- Hopetown welcome sign

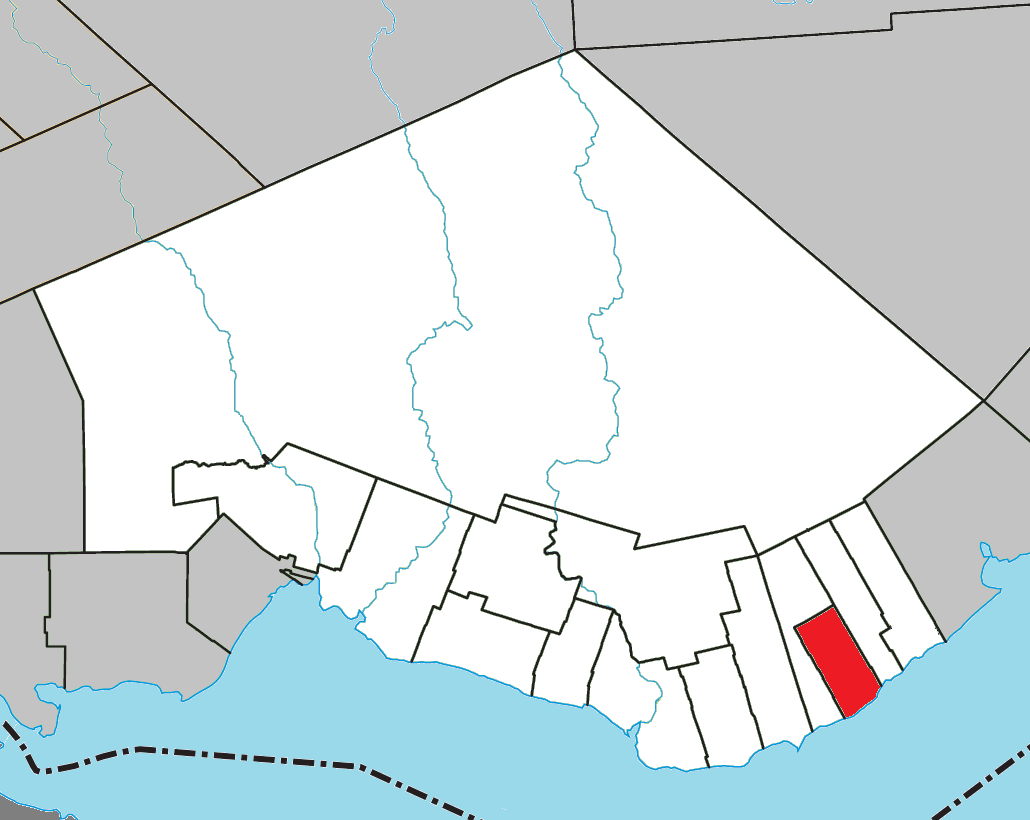
- Location within Bonaventure RCM

- Location in eastern Quebec
- Coordinates: 48°03′N 65°10′W
- Country: Canada
- Province: Quebec
- Region: Gaspésie– Îles-de-la-Madeleine
- RCM: Bonaventure
- Settled: 1768
- Constituted: November 21, 1936
- Named for: Henry Hope

Government
  - Mayor: Linda McWhirter
  - Federal riding: Gaspésie—Les Îles-de-la-Madeleine—Listuguj
  - Prov. riding: Bonaventure

Area
  - Total: 51.44 km^{2} (19.86 sq mi)
  - Land: 51.26 km^{2} (19.79 sq mi)

Population (2021)
  - Total: 334
  - Density: 6.5/km^{2} (17/sq mi)
  - Pop (2016-21): ▼1.5%
  - Dwellings: 167
- Time zone: UTC−5 (EST)
  - Summer (DST): UTC−4 (EDT)
- Postal code(s): G0C 3C1
- Area codes: 418 and 581
- Highways: R-132
- Website: www.municipalite hopetown.com

Hope Town is a municipality in the Gaspésie–Îles-de-la-Madeleine region of the province of Quebec in Canada. Despite its name, the place does not have a "town" (ville) status.

== History ==
In 1768, the first pioneer arrived, a certain Duncan McRae, a soldier of the 78th Fraser Highlanders and native of Dundee in Scotland. His friend and fellow soldier John Ross, who also served in General Wolfe's army, is thought to be the one that attributed the name "Hope" to the place. In 1786, a wave of Loyalists followed and the village was really established.

In 1936, the place separated from Hope Township and was incorporated as the Municipality of Hope East. In 1953, it was renamed to Hope Town.

== Demographics ==
=== Population ===
Canada census – Hope Town community profile

	2021	2016	2011
Population	334 (-1.5% from 2016)	339 (-1.5% from 2011)	344 (-0.9% from 2006)
Land area	51.26 km^{2} (19.79 sq mi)	50.91 km^{2} (19.66 sq mi)	50.11 km^{2} (19.35 sq mi)
Population density	6.5/km^{2} (17/sq mi)	6.7/km^{2} (17/sq mi)	6.9/km^{2} (18/sq mi)
Median age	50.8 (M: 52.0, F: 49.2)	51.2 (M: 51.8, F: 50.7)	52.7 (M: 52.1, F: 53.5)
Private dwellings	167 (total) 142 (occupied)	170 (total) 139 (occupied)	179 (total)
Median household income	$61,200	$47,744	$50,325

References: 2021 2016 2011

Historical Census Data - Hope Town, Quebec

Year	Pop.	±%
1941	640	—
1951	570	−10.9%
1956	571	+0.2%
1961	486	−14.9%
1966	446	−8.2%
1971	365	−18.2%
1976	355	−2.7%
1981	358	+0.8%

Year	Pop.	±%
1986	373	+4.2%
1991	376	+0.8%
1996	371	−1.3%
2001	340	−8.4%
2006	347	+2.1%
2011	344	−0.9%
2016	339	−1.5%
2021	334	−1.5%

Source: Statistics Canada

=== Language ===
Mother tongue (2021):

- English as first language: 56.7%
- French as first language: 38.8%
- English and French as first language: 3.0%
- Other as first language: 1.5%

== Government ==
List of former mayors:

- Léon Dubé (...–2009)
- Lisa Marie MacWhirter (2009–2013)
- Linda MacWhirter (2013–present)

== See also ==
- List of anglophone communities in Quebec
- List of municipalities in Quebec
