= List of postal codes of Canada: G =

This is a list of postal codes in Canada where the first letter is G. Postal codes beginning with G are located within the Canadian province of Quebec. Only the first three characters are listed, corresponding to the Forward Sortation Area (FSA).

Canada Post provides a free postal code look-up tool on its website, via its mobile apps for such smartphones as the iPhone and BlackBerry, and sells hard-copy directories and CD-ROMs. Many vendors also sell validation tools, which allow customers to properly match addresses and postal codes. Hard-copy directories can also be consulted in all post offices, and some libraries.

== Eastern Quebec ==
There are currently 140 FSAs in this list.

=== Urban ===
G1A; Quebec City; Quebec Provincial Government	G2A; Quebec City; North Loretteville	G3A; Saint-Augustin-de-Desmaures	G4A; Clermont	G5A; La Malbaie	G6A; Saint-Georges; Northwest	G7A; Lévis	G8A; Saguenay; West Jonquière	G9A; Trois-Rivières; East
G1B; Quebec City; Beauport North	G2B; Quebec City; Loretteville South	G3B; Lac-Beauport	G4B; Not assigned	G5B; Port-Cartier	G6B; Lac-Mégantic; Frontenac	G7B; Saguenay (La Baie)	G8B; Alma; Southeast	G9B; Trois-Rivières; South
G1C; Quebec City; Central Beauport	G2C; Quebec City; Northwest	G3C; Stoneham-et-Tewkesbury; Lac-Delage	G4C; Not assigned	G5C; Baie-Comeau; Southwest	G6C; Lévis	G7C; Not assigned	G8C; Alma; Southwest	G9C; Trois-Rivières; West
G1E; Quebec City; Beauport South	G2E; Quebec City; L'Ancienne-Lorette	G3E; Quebec City; Saint-Émile	G4E; Not assigned	G5E; Not assigned	G6E; Sainte-Marie	G7E; Not assigned	G8E; Alma; North	G9E; Not assigned
G1G; Quebec City; Charlesbourg (Orsainville)	G2G; Quebec City; L'Ancienne-Lorette (YQB)	G3G; Quebec City (Lac-Saint-Charles)	G4G; Not assigned	G5G; Not assigned	G6G; Thetford Mines; Saint-Jean-de-Brébeuf	G7G; Saguenay; North Chicoutimi	G8G; Métabetchouan–Lac-à-la-Croix	G9G; Not assigned
G1H; Quebec City; South Charlesbourg	G2H; Not assigned	G3H; Pont-Rouge	G4H; Not assigned	G5H; Mont-Joli; Saint-Joseph-de-Lepage	G6H; Thetford Mines; Irlande	G7H; Saguenay; East Chicoutimi	G8H; Roberval	G9H; Bécancour
G1J; Quebec City; Lower Riverbank	G2J; Quebec City; Inner North	G3J; Quebec City; Val-Bélair North	G4J; Not assigned	G5J; Amqui	G6J; Lévis	G7J; Saguenay; Chicoutimi West	G8J; Saint-Prime; La Doré	G9J; Not assigned
G1K; Quebec City; Notre-Dame-des-Anges	G2K; Quebec City; Outer North	G3K; Quebec City; South Val-Bélair	G4K; Not assigned	G5K; Not assigned	G6K; Lévis	G7K; Saguenay; Southwest Chicoutimi	G8K; Saint-Félicien	G9K; Not assigned
G1L; Quebec City; Northeast	G2L; Quebec City; Charlesbourg (Bourg-Royal)	G3L; Saint-Raymond	G4L; Not assigned	G5L; Rimouski; Central	G6L; Plessisville; Princeville	G7L; Not assigned	G8L; Dolbeau-Mistassini; Saint-Stanislas	G9L; Not assigned
G1M; Quebec City; North Central	G2M; Quebec City; Northeast	G3M; Donnacona	G4M; Not assigned	G5M; Rimouski; Northeast	G6M; Not assigned	G7M; Not assigned	G8M; Normandin; Albanel	G9M; Not assigned
G1N; Quebec City; South Central	G2N; Quebec City; West	G3N; Sainte-Catherine-de-la-Jacques-Cartier; Fossambault-sur-le-Lac; Lac-Saint-Joseph	G4N; Not assigned	G5N; Rimouski; Southwest	G6N; Not assigned	G7N; Saguenay (Laterrière)	G8N; Hébertville	G9N; Shawinigan; Central
G1P; Quebec City; West	G2P; Not assigned	G3P; Not assigned	G4P; Not assigned	G5P; Not assigned	G6P; Victoriaville; Central	G7P; Saint-Ambroise	G8P; Chibougamau	G9P; Shawinigan; Southeast
G1R; Quebec City; Saint-Louis-de-Gonzague-du-Cap-Tourmente	G2R; Not assigned	G3R; Not assigned	G4R; Sept-Îles; Maliotenam; Uashat	G5R; Rivière-du-Loup	G6R; Victoriaville; Saint-Christophe-d'Arthabaska	G7R; Not assigned	G8R; Not assigned	G9R; Shawinigan; Northwest
G1S; Quebec City; South	G2S; Not assigned	G3S; Shannon	G4S; Sept-Îles; Northwest	G5S; Not assigned	G6S; Victoriaville; East	G7S; Saguenay; Northeast Jonquière	G8S; Not assigned	G9S; Not assigned
G1T; Quebec City; Upper Riverbank	G2T; Not assigned	G3T; Not assigned	G4T; Les Îles-de-la-Madeleine; Grosse-Île	G5T; Dégelis	G6T; Victoriaville; Northwest	G7T; Saguenay; Southeast Jonquière	G8T; Trois-Rivières; Central and southeast	G9T; Shawinigan (Grand-Mère)
G1V; Quebec City; Northeast Sainte-Foy	G2V; Not assigned	G3V; Not assigned	G4V; Sainte-Anne-des-Monts	G5V; Montmagny	G6V; Lévis; North	G7V; Not assigned	G8V; Trois-Rivières; Northeast	G9V; Not assigned
G1W; Quebec City; Southeast Sainte-Foy	G2W; Not assigned	G3W; Not assigned	G4W; Matane	G5W; Not assigned	G6W; Lévis; South	G7W; Not assigned	G8W; Trois-Rivières; West	G9W; Not assigned
G1X; Quebec City; West Sainte-Foy	G2X; Not assigned	G3X; Not assigned	G4X; Gaspé	G5X; Beauceville	G6X; Lévis	G7X; Saguenay; Central Jonquière	G8X; Not assigned	G9X; La Tuque; La Bostonnais
G1Y; Quebec City (Cap-Rouge)	G2Y; Not assigned	G3Y; Not assigned	G4Y; Not assigned	G5Y; Saint-Georges; Central	G6Y; Lévis	G7Y; Saguenay; Southwest Jonquière	G8Y; Trois-Rivières; Central	G9Y; Not assigned
G1Z; Not assigned	G2Z; Not assigned	G3Z; Baie-Saint-Paul	G4Z; Baie-Comeau; Northeast	G5Z; Saint-Georges; Southeast	G6Z; Lévis	G7Z; Saguenay; Northwest Jonquière	G8Z; Trois-Rivières; Northeast	G9Z; Not assigned

=== Rural ===
G0A
Capitale-Nationale

1A0: Sainte-Christine-d'Auvergne
1E0: Beaupré
1H0: Boischatel
1L0: Cap-Santé
1N0: Château-Richer
1S0: Deschambault-Grondines (Deschambault)
1W0: Deschambault-Grondines (Grondines)
1X0: L'Isle-aux-Coudres
2A0: L'Isle-aux-Coudres (La Baleine)
2J0: Lac-Sergent
2K0: L'Ange-Gardien
2L0: Petite-Rivière-Saint-François
2M0: Les Éboulements
2R0: Neuville
2Y0: Portneuf
3A0: Rivière-à-Pierre
3B0: Saint-Alban
3C0: Sainte-Anne-de-Beaupré
3G0: Saint-Basile
3J0: L'Isle-aux-Coudres (Saint-Bernard-sur-Mer)
3K0: Sainte-Brigitte-de-Laval
3L0: Saint-Casimir
3P0: Sainte-Famille-de-l'Île-d'Orléans (Sainte-Famille)
3R0: Saint-Ferréol-les-Neiges
3S0: Saint-François-de-l'Île-d'Orléans
3T0: Saint-Gilbert
3V0: Saint-Hilarion
3W0: Saint-Jean-de-l'Île-d'Orléans
3X0: Saint-Joachim (Saint-Joachim-de-Montmorency)
3Y0: Les Éboulements (Saint-Joseph-de-la-Rive)
3Z0: Saint-Laurent-de-l'Île-d'Orléans
4A0: Saint-Léonard-de-Portneuf
4B0: Saint-Marc-des-Carrières
4C0: Sainte-Pétronille
4E0: Saint-Pierre-de-l'Île-d'Orléans
4H0: Saint-Thuribe
4J0: Saint-Tite-des-Caps
4K0: Saint-Urbain (Saint-Urbain-de-Charlevoix)
4L0: Saint-Ubalde
4S0: Saint-Gabriel-de-Valcartier
4V0: Wendake
4Z0: Saint-Gabriel-de-Valcartier (CFB Valcartier) (Courcelette)

G0B
Not in use
G0C
Gaspésie-Sud

1A0: Percé (Barachois)
1C0: New Richmond
1E0: Bonaventure
1G0: Percé (Cap-d'Espoir)
1H0: Caplan
1J0: Carleton-sur-Mer (Carleton)
1K0: Chandler
1L0: Pointe-à-la-Croix
1N0: Escuminac
1P0: Port-Daniel–Gascons (Gascons)
1T0: Cascapédia–Saint-Jules
1V0: Grande-Rivière
1W0: Grande-Rivière (West)
1X0: Pointe-à-la-Croix (L'Alverne)
1Y0: Maria
1Y1: Gesgapegiag
1Z0: New Carlisle
2A0: Chandler (Newport)
2B0: New Richmond
2E0: Nouvelle
2G0: Nouvelle (West)
2H0: Chandler (Pabos)
2J0: Chandler (Pabos Mills)
2K0: Paspébiac (Hope)
2L0: Percé
2M0: Escuminac (Pointe-à-la-Garde)
2N0: Port-Daniel–Gascons (Port-Daniel)
2R0: Listuguj
2V0: Saint-Alphonse (Saint-Alphonse-de-Caplan)
2W0: Saint-Elzéar (Saint-Elzéar-de-Bonaventure)
2X0: Percé (Saint-Georges-de-Malbaie)
2Y0: Saint-Jogues (Hope)
2Z0: Carleton-sur-Mer (Saint-Omer)
3A0: Saint-Siméon (Saint-Siméon-de-Bonaventure)
3B0: Sainte-Thérèse-de-Gaspé
3C0: Saint-Godefroi
3C1: Hope Town
3E0: Shigawake
3G0: Percé (Val-d'Espoir)

G0E
Gaspésie-Nord

1C0: La Martre (Cap-au-Renard)
1G0: Cloridorme
1K0: Grande-Vallée
1L0: Saint-Maxime-du-Mont-Louis (Gros-Morne)
1P0: Sainte-Madeleine-de-la-Rivière-Madeleine (Madeleine-Centre)
1R0: Sainte-Madeleine-de-la-Rivière-Madeleine (Manche-d'Épée)
1S0: Marsoui
1T0: Saint-Maxime-du-Mont-Louis (Mont-Louis)
1V0: Mont-Saint-Pierre
1W0: Murdochville
1Y0: Petite-Vallée
1Z0: Rivière-à-Claude
2B0: Sainte-Madeleine-de-la-Rivière-Madeleine (Rivière-la-Madeleine)
2C0: Rivière-à-Claude (Ruisseau-à-Rebours)
2E0: Saint-Maxime-du-Mont-Louis (L'Anse-Pleureuse)
2H0: La Martre

G0G
Côte-Nord & Anticosti

1A0: Aguanish
1B0: Baie-Johan-Beetz
1C0: Blanc-Sablon
1E0: Blanc-Sablon (Brador)
1G0: Côte-Nord-du-Golfe-du-Saint-Laurent (Chevery)
1H0: Sept-Îles (Clarke City)
1J0: Fermont
1L0: Sept-Îles (Gallix)
1M0: La Romaine (Gethsemani)
1N0: Côte-Nord-du-Golfe-du-Saint-Laurent (Harrington Harbour)
1P0: Havre-Saint-Pierre
1R0: Aguanish (L'Île-Michon)
1S0: Côte-Nord-du-Golfe-du-Saint-Laurent (Kegashka)
1T0: Gros-Mécatina (La Tabatière)
1V0: Longue-Pointe-de-Mingan
1W0: Blanc-Sablon (Lourdes-de-Blanc-Sablon)
1X0: Rivière-Saint-Jean (Magpie)
1Z0: Bonne-Espérance (Middle Bay)
2A0: Mingan
2B0: Sept-Îles (Moisie)
2C0: Gros-Mécatina (Mutton Bay)
2E0: Natashquan, Nutashkuan
2G0: Bonne-Espérance (Old Fort Bay)
2L0: Rivière-au-Tonnerre
2N0: Rivière-Saint-Jean
2P0: Bonne-Espérance (Rivière-Saint-Paul)
2R0: Saint-Augustin (Saint-Augustin-Saguenay)
2T0: Matimekosh, Schefferville
2V0: Rivière-au-Tonnette (Sheldrake)
2W0: Côte-Nord-du-Golfe-du-Saint-Laurent (Tête-à-la-Baleine)
2Y0: L'Île-d'Anticosti (Port-Menier)
2Z0: Kawawachikamach

G0H
Manicouagan

1A0: Baie-Trinité
1B0: Pessamit
1C0: Chute-aux-Outardes
1E0: Franquelin
1G0: Godbout
1M0: Pointe-aux-Outardes
1N0: Pointe-Lebel
1P0: Colombier
1R0: Port-Cartier (Rivière-Pentecote)
1S0: Ragueneau

G0J
Gaspésie-Ouest

1A0: Albertville
1C0: Baie-des-Sables
1E0: Cap-Chat
1G0: Cap-Chat (Est)
1H0: Cap-Chat (Capucins)
1J0: Causapscal
1K0: Grosses-Roches
1M0: Lac-au-Saumon
1N0: Saint-Zénon-du-Lac-Humqui (Lac-Humqui)
1P0: La Rédemption
1R0: L'Ascension-de-Patapédia
1S0: Métis-sur-Mer
1T0: Les Méchins
1V0: Matapédia, Ristigouche-Sud-Est
1X0: Padoue
1Z0: Price, Grand-Métis
2A0: Routhierville
2B0: Saint-Adelme
2C0: Saint-Alexandre-des-Lacs
2E0: Saint-Alexis-de-Matapédia
2G0: Saint-André-de-Restigouche
2H0: Sainte-Angèle-de-Mérici
2J0: Saint-Damase (Saint-Damase-de-Matapédia)
2K0: Sainte-Félicité
2L0: Sainte-Flavie
2M0: Sainte-Florence
2N0: Saint-François-d'Assise
2P0: Sainte-Irène (Ste-Irène-de-Matapédia)
2R0: Saint-Jean-de-Cherbourg
2T0: Sainte-Jeanne-d'Arc-de-la-Mitis
2V0: Saint-Léandre
2W0: Saint-Léon-le-Grand
2Y0: Sainte-Marguerite-Marie
2Z0: Saint-Moïse
3A0: Saint-Noël
3B0: Saint-Octave-de-Métis (Saint-Octave)
3C0: Sainte-Paule
3E0: Saint-René-de-Matane
3G0: Saint-Tharcisius
3H0: Saint-Ulric
3J0: Saint-Vianney
3K0: Sayabec
3L0: Val-Brillant
3N0: Saint-Cléophas

G0K
Bas-Saint-Laurent-Est

1A0: Esprit-Saint
1B0: La Trinité-des-Monts
1C0: Les Hauteurs
1H0: Saint-Anaclet-de-Lessard (Saint-Anaclet)
1K0: Saint-Charles-Garnier
1L0: Saint-Donat
1M0: Saint-Gabriel-de-Rimouski
1P0: Sainte-Luce
1R0: Saint-Marcellin
1S0: Saint-Narcisse-de-Rimouski
1T0: Biencourt
1V0: Lac-des-Aigles
1W0: Lac-des-Aigles (Saint-Guy)

G0L
Bas-Saint-Laurent-Ouest

1A0: Auclair
1B0: Rimouski
1E0: Témiscouata-sur-le-Lac
1G0: Cacouna
1J0: Pohénégamook
1K0: L'Isle-Verte, Notre-Dame-des-Sept-Douleurs
1L0: L'Isle-Verte
1M0: Kamouraska
1P0: Saint-Eugène-de-Ladrière (Ladrière)
1S0: Lejeune
1T0: Saint-Marc-du-Lac-Long
1V0: Saint-Juste-du-Lac (Lots-Renversés)
1W0: Mont-Carmel
1X0: Témiscouata-sur-le-Lac (Notre-Dame-du-Lac)
1Y0: Notre-Dame-du-Portage
1Z0: Packington
2B0: Rivière-Bleue
2C0: Rivière-Ouelle
2E0: Notre-Dame-des-Neiges, Riviere-Trois-Pistoles
2G0: Saint-Alexandre-de-Kamouraska
2H0: Saint-André-de-Kamouraska
2J0: Saint-Antonin
2K0: Saint-Arsène
2L0: Saint-Athanase
2M0: Saint-Bruno-de-Kamouraska
2N0: Saint-Clément
2P0: Saint-Cyprien
2R0: Saint-Denis-De La Bouteillerie
2V0: Saint-Éloi
2W0: Saint-Elzéar-de-Témiscouata
2X0: Saint-Épiphane
2Y0: Saint-Eusèbe
2Z0: Saint-Fabien
3B0: Sainte-Françoise
3C0: Saint-François-Xavier-de-Viger
3E0: Saint-Gabriel-de-Kamouraska, Saint-Gabriel-Lalemant
3G0: Saint-Germain-de-Kamouraska
3J0: Sainte-Hélène-de-Kamouraska
3K0: Saint-Honoré-de-Temiscouata
3L0: Saint-Hubert-de-Rivière-du-Loup
3M0: Saint-Jean-de-Dieu
3N0: Saint-Jean-de-la-Lande
3P0: Saint-Joseph-de-Kamouraska
3R0: Saint-Juste-du-Lac
3S0: Saint-Louis-du-Ha! Ha!
3T0: Saint-Mathieu-de-Rioux
3V0: Saint-Médard
3W0: Saint-Modeste
3X0: Saint-Pacôme
3Y0: Saint-Pascal
3Z0: Saint-Paul-de-la-Croix
4A0: Saint-Philippe-de-Néri
4B0: Saint-Pierre-de-Lamy
4C0: Saint-Simon-de-Rimouski
4E0: Saint-Valérien (Saint-Valérien-de-Rimouski)
4G0: Sainte-Rita
4H0: Saint-Michel-du-Squatec (Squatec)
4K0: Trois-Pistoles

G0M
Région de Beauce

1B0: Saint-Martin
1C0: Courcelles-Saint-Évariste (Courcelles) (Saint-Évariste-de-Forsyth)
1G0: La Guadeloupe, Saint-Hilaire-de-Dorset
1H0: Lambton
1J0: Saint-Côme–Linière
1K0: Notre-Dame-des-Pins, Saint-Simon-les-Mines
1L0: Saint-Alfred
1M0: Sainte-Aurélie
1N0: Saint-Benjamin
1P0: Saint-Benoît-Labre, Lac-Poulin
1R0: Saint-Éphrem-de-Beauce
1S0: Courcelles-Saint-Évariste (Saint-Évariste-de-Forsyth)
1T0: Saint-Gédéon-de-Beauce
1V0: Saint-Honoré-de-Shenley
1W0: Saint-Ludger
1X0: Saint-Philibert
1Y0: Saint-Prosper (Saint-Prosper-de-Dorchester)
1Z0: Saint-René
2A0: Saint-Théophile
2B0: Saint-Victor
2C0: Saint-Zacharie
2E0: Saint-Robert-Bellarmin

G0N
Chaudière-Sud

1B0: Saint-Joseph-de-Coleraine, Saint-Julien
1C0: Sainte-Clotilde-de-Beauce
1E0: Disraeli
1E1: Sainte-Praxède
1E2: Saint-Jacques-le-Majeur-de-Wolfestown
1G0: Sacré-Cœur-de-Jésus (East Broughton)
1H0: East Broughton (East Broughton Station)
1J0: Saint-Jacques-de-Leeds
1K0: Kinnear's Mills
1M0: Saint-Adrien-d'Irlande
1N0: Saint-Ferdinand
1P0: Saint-Frédéric
1R0: Saint-Jules
1S0: Adstock
1T0: Saint-Pierre-de-Broughton
1V0: Saint-Séverin (Saint-Séverin-de-Beauce)
1X0: Tring-Jonction

G0P
Centre-du-Québec-Est

1A0: Ham-Nord
1A1: Saints-Martyrs-Canadiens
1B0: Saint-Norbert-d'Arthabaska
1C0: Notre-Dame-de-Ham
1G0: Saint-Fortunat
1H0: Sainte-Hélène-de-Chester
1J0: Chesterville
1K0: Saint-Pierre-Baptiste
1L0: Sainte-Sophie-d'Halifax
1M0: Saint-Valère

G0R
Appalaches

1A0: Armagh
1B0: Saint-Cyprien (Saint-Cyprien-des-Etchemins)
1C0: Beaumont
1E0: Berthier-sur-Mer
1G0: Notre-Dame-Auxiliatrice-de-Buckland (Buckland)
1H0: Cap-Saint-Ignace
1L0: Saint-Luc-de-Bellechasse
1M0: Frampton
1N0: Honfleur
1P0: Saint-Antoine-de-l'Isle-aux-Grues (L'Isle-aux-Grues)
1S0: Lac-Etchemin
1T0: Lac-Frontière
1W0: La Durantaye
1X0: L'Islet
1Y0: Sainte-Justine
1Z0: La Pocatière
2A0: La Pocatière (Sainte-Anne-de-la-Pocatière)
2B0: L'Islet
2C0: L'Islet
2H0: Notre-Dame-du-Rosaire
2J0: Saint-Fabien-de-Panet
2L0: Saint-Louis-de-Gonzague (Ravignan)
2M0: Saint-Adalbert
2N0: Saint-Anselme
2P0: Sainte-Apolline-de-Patton
2R0: Saint-Aubert
2S0: Saint-Camille-de-Lellis
2T0: Saint-Charles-de-Bellechasse
2V0: Sainte-Claire
2W0: Saint-Cyrille-de-Lessard (Saint-Cyrille-de-L'Islet)
2X0: Saint-Damase-de-L'Islet (Saint-Damase-des-Aulnaies)
2Y0: Saint-Damien-de-Buckland
2Z0: Sainte-Euphémie-sur-Rivière-du-Sud (Sainte-Euphémie)
3A0: Saint-François-de-la-Rivière-du-Sud
3C0: Saint-Gervais
3E0: Saint-Henri (Saint-Henri-de-Levis)
3G0: Saint-Jean-Port-Joli
3H0: Saint-Just-de-Bretenières
3J0: Saint-Lazare-de-Bellechasse
3K0: Sainte-Louise
3L0: Sainte-Lucie-de-Beauregard
3M0: Saint-Magloire
3N0: Saint-Malachie
3R0: Saint-Marcel (Saint-Marcel-de-L'Islet)
3S0: Saint-Michel-de-Bellechasse
3T0: Saint-Nazaire-de-Dorchester
3V0: Saint-Nérée-de-Bellechasse (Saint-Nérée)
3W0: La Pocatière (Saint-Onésime-d'Ixworth, Saint-Onésime)
3X0: Saint-Pamphile
3Y0: Saint-Paul-de-Montminy
3Z0: Sainte-Perpétue (Sainte-Perpétue-de-L'Islet)
4A0: Saint-Philémon
4B0: Saint-Pierre-de-la-Rivière-du-Sud
4C0: Saint-Raphaël
4E0: Saint-Roch-des-Aulnaies
4G0: Sainte-Rose-de-Watford
4H0: Sainte-Sabine (Sainte-Sabine-de-Bellechasse)
4J0: Saint-Vallier
4L0: Saint-Léon-de-Standon (Standon)
4M0: Tourville
4P0: Sainte-Felicité (Sainte-Felicité-de-L'Islet)
4R0: Saint-Omer (Saint-Omer-L'Islet)

G0S
Chaudière-Nord

1B0: Saint-Patrice-de-Beaurivage
1G0: Deschaillons-sur-Saint-Laurent
1H0: Dosquet
1J0: Fortierville
1K0: Inverness
1L0: Notre-Dame-du-Sacré-Cœur-d'Issoudun (Issoudun)
1M0: Saint-Janvier-de-Joly (Joly)
1N0: Laurier-Station
1P0: Laurierville
1S0: Lotbinière
1T0: Notre-Dame-de-Lourdes (Lourdes)
1V0: Lyster
1W0: Saint-Narcisse-de-Beaurivage
1X0: Parisville
1Y0: Saint-Édouard-de-Lotbinière
1Z0: Saint-Agapit
2A0: Sainte-Agathe-de-Lotbinière
2C0: Saint-Antoine-de-Tilly
2E0: Saint-Apollinaire
2G0: Saint-Bernard
2H0: Sainte-Croix
2J0: Saint-Elzéar
2K0: Leclercville
2M0: Saint-Flavien
2N0: Sainte-Françoise (Sainte-Françoise-de-Lotbinière)
2P0: Saint-Gilles
2R0: Sainte-Hénédine
2S0: Saint-Isidore
2V0: Saint-Joseph-de-Beauce, Saint-Joseph-des-Érables
2W0: Saint-Lambert-de-Lauzon
2X0: Sainte-Marguerite (Sainte-Marguerite-de-Dorchester)
3A0: Saint-Odilon-de-Cranbourne (Saint-Odilon)
3C0: Saint-Sylvestre
3E0: Saints-Anges
3G0: Scott
3H0: Val-Alain
3J0: Vallée-Jonction
3K0: Villeroy

G0T
Le Fjord

1A0: Baie-Sainte-Catherine
1E0: Forestville
1G0: Les-Bergeronnes
1K0: Les Escoumins
1L0: Notre-Dame-des-Monts
1P0: Portneuf-sur-Mer
1S0: Saint-Aimé-des-Lacs
1V0: Saint-Irénée
1X0: Saint-Siméon
1Y0: Sacré-Coeur (Sacré-Coeur-Saguenay)
1Z0: Longue-Rive
2A0: Tadoussac

G0V
Saguenay-Lac-Saint-Jean-Est

1A0: Saguenay (Alouette)
1B0: Bégin
1C0: Saint-David-de-Falardeau (Falardeau)
1G0: Saint-Charles-de-Bourget
1H0: Ferland-et-Boilleau
1J0: L'Anse-Saint-Jean
1L0: Saint-Honoré (Saint-Honoré-de-Chicoutimi)
1M0: Saint-Félix-d'Otis
1N0: Petit-Saguenay
1P0: Rivière-Éternité
1S0: Saint-Fulgence
1T0: Sainte-Rose-du-Nord

G0W
Saguenay-Lac-Saint-Jean-Ouest

1B0: Saint-Eugène-d'Argentenay, Notre-Dame-de-Lorette
1C0: Mistissini
1E0: Sainte-Jeanne-d'Arc
1G0: Chambord
1H0: Chapais
1K0: Saint-Augustin (Dalmas)
1M0: Saint-François-de-Sales
1N0: Desbiens
1P0: Saint-Thomas-Didyme
1R0: Girardville
1T0: Hébertville (Hébertville-Station)
1V0: Lac-Bouchette
1X0: Lamarche
1Y0: L'Ascension-de-Notre-Seigneur
1Z0: Larouche
2B0: Saint-Ludger-de-Milot
2G0: Péribonka
2H0: Mashteuiatsh
2K0: Saint-André-du-Lac-Saint-Jean
2L0: Hébertville (Saint-Bruno-Lac-Saint-Jean)
2M0: Saint-Edmond-les-Plaines
2P0: Saint-Gédéon
2R0: Sainte-Hedwidge (Sainte-Hedwidge-de-Roberval)
2S0: Labrecque
2T0: Sainte-Monique (Sainte-Monique–Lac-Saint-Jean)
2V0: Saint-Nazaire (Saint-Nazaire–Lac-Saint-Jean)
2X0: Saint-Henri-de-Taillon (Taillon)
3B0: Obedjiwan
3C0: Oujé-Bougoumou

G0X
Mauricie

1A0: Batiscan
1B0: Wôlinak
1C0: Champlain
1E0: Charette
1H0: Grandes-Piles
1J0: Hérouxville
1L0: Shawinigan
1M0: Lac-aux-Sables
1N0: Saint-Mathieu-du-Parc
1R0: La Tuque (La Croche)
1S0: Lemieux
1V0: Manseau
1W0: Notre-Dame-de-Montauban
2B0: Saint-Séverin (Proulxville)
2C0: Trois-Rives
2E0: Saint-Roch-de-Mékinac
2G0: Saint-Adelphe (Saint-Adelphe-de-Champlain)
2J0: Sainte-Anne-de-la-Pérade
2K0: Saint-Barnabé (Nord)
2L0: Saint-Boniface
2M0: Sainte-Cécile-de-Lévrard
2N0: Saint-Élie-de-Caxton
2P0: Saint-Étienne-des-Grès
2R0: Sainte-Geneviève-de-Batiscan
2V0: Shawinigan (Saint-Jean-des-Piles)
2W0: Sainte-Marie-de-Blandford
2X0: Saint-Maurice
2Y0: Saint-Narcisse
2Z0: Saint-Pierre-les-Becquets
3A0: Saint-Prosper-de-Champlain (Saint-Prosper)
3B0: Saint-Sévère
3C0: Sainte-Sophie-de-Lévrard
3E0: Saint-Stanislas (Saint-Stanislas-de-Champlain)
3G0: Sainte-Thècle
3H0: Saint-Tite
3J0: Notre-Dame-du-Mont-Carmel
3K0: Saint-Luc-de-Vincennes
3L0: Yamachiche
3M0: La Tuque (Clova)
3N0: Lac-Édouard
3P0: La Tuque (Parent)
3R0: Wemotaci

G0Y
L'Érable

1A0: Audet
1B0: Beaulac-Garthby
1C0: Lac-Drolet
1E0: Milan
1E1: Val-Racine
1G0: Nantes, Marston
1H0: Piopolis
1J0: Sainte-Cécile-de-Whitton
1L0: Saint-Romain
1M0: Saint-Sébastien (Saint-Sébastien-de-Frontenac)
1N0: Stornoway
1P0: Stratford
1R0: Saint-Augustin-de-Woburn (Woburn)

G0Z
Centre-du-Québec-Nord

1A0: Aston-Jonction
1B0: Saint-Louis-de-Blandford
1C0: Daveluyville, Maddington Falls
1E0: Sainte-Eulalie
1G0: Saint-Samuel
1H0: Saint-Sylvère
1J0: Saint-Wenceslas
1K0: Saint-Rosaire

== Most populated FSAs ==
1. G0R, 84,338
2. G0A, 83,411
3. G0S, 72,494
4. G0L, 60,937
5. G0X, 60,486

== Least populated FSAs ==
1. G7Y, 628
2. G7K, 762
3. G7T, 1,640
4. G9R, 2,324
5. G8N, 2,511
