= Shigawake =

- Municipality
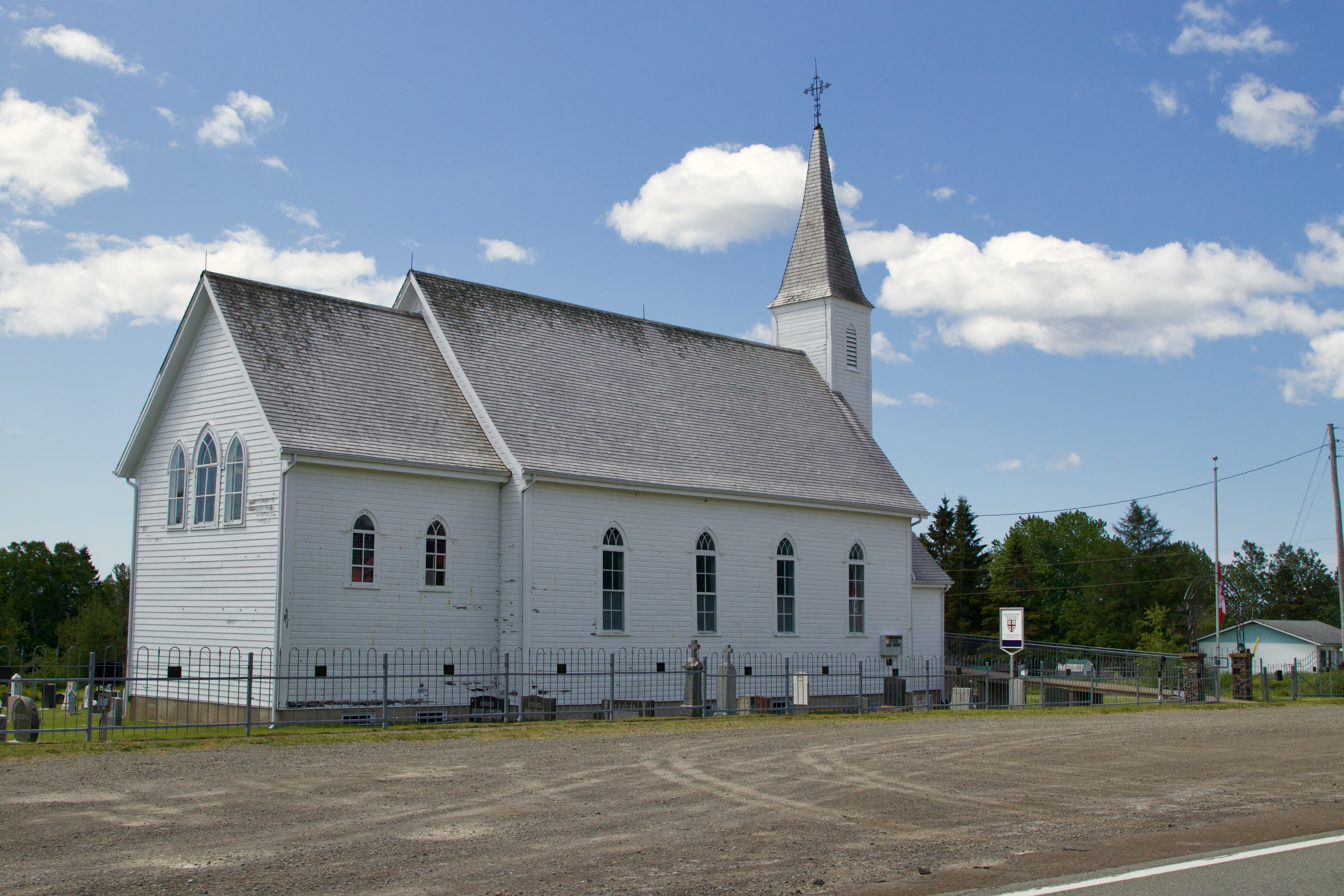
- Saint Paul Church in Shigawake

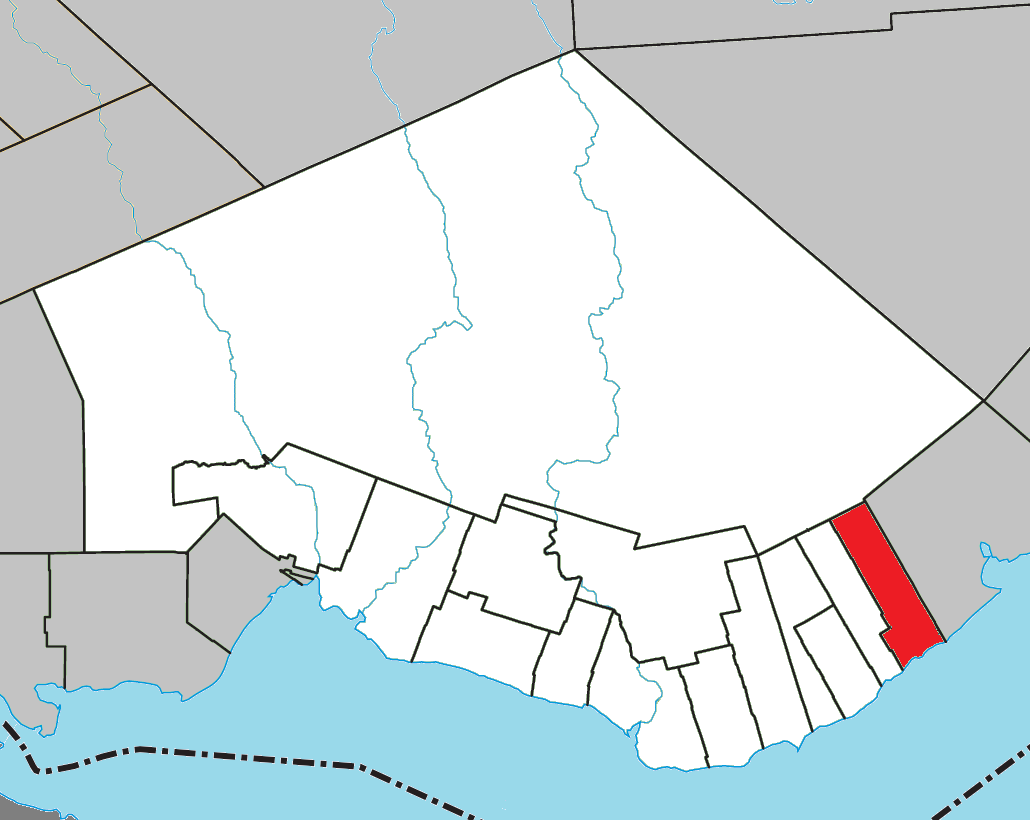
- Location within Bonaventure RCM

- Location in eastern Quebec
- Coordinates: 48°06′N 65°05′W
- Country: Canada
- Province: Quebec
- Region: Gaspésie– Îles-de-la-Madeleine
- RCM: Bonaventure
- Settled: Late 18th century
- Constituted: December 15, 1924

Government
  - Mayor: Rolande Beebe
  - Federal riding: Gaspésie—Les Îles-de-la-Madeleine—Listuguj
  - Prov. riding: Bonaventure

Area
  - Total: 75.85 km^{2} (29.29 sq mi)
  - Land: 76.82 km^{2} (29.66 sq mi)
- There is an apparent contradiction between two authoritative sources.

Population (2021)
  - Total: 333
  - Density: 4.3/km^{2} (11/sq mi)
  - Pop (2016-21): ▲14.0%
  - Dwellings: 167
- Time zone: UTC−5 (EST)
  - Summer (DST): UTC−4 (EDT)
- Postal code(s): G0C 3E0
- Area codes: 418 and 581
- Highways: R-132
- Website: municipalityshigawake.com

Shigawake is a municipality in the Gaspésie–Îles-de-la-Madeleine region of the province of Quebec in Canada. Shigawake is bordered to the west by Saint-Godefroi and to the east by Port-Daniel–Gascons.

The place name is taken from the river that flows through the village and is of Mi'kmaq origin, meaning either "land of the rising sun" or "white water".

The Municipality of Shigawake has an eight kilometre stretch of coastline behind high red cliffs on the Gaspe Coast. It has been officially designated as an Anglophone community among the largely Francophone population of Quebec. The community is only home to, among many small houses, a municipal building, the Anglican church of St Paul's (built in the 1860s), and a former Rectory converted to the Community Centre. The United Church was decommissioned in 2012, formerly the site of a temperance hall.

Shigawake has held the Shigawake Fair annually since 1909, also now paired with the Shigawake Music Festival which has showcased local talent.

Shigawake is also the site of Seagro, an organic fertiliser and composting firm.

The oldest farmhouse on the entire coast continuously inhabited by one family, the Old Homestead, was built early in the first decade of the 1800s. The founding of Shigawake is described in The Alford Saga, an eight book series of a romantic adventures by Paul Almond, an officer of the Order of Canada.

The area's fields, once so productive, are now used mainly for hay and its forests for harvest of sawlogs and firewood.

== History ==
It is believed that the first settlers were probably sailors on a ship transporting slaves at the end of the 18th century.

In 1864, its post office opened, and the parish was formed in 1873. But it was only on December 15, 1924, more than 50 years after, that Shigawake was officially created by splitting away from the Township of Saint-Godefroy.

== Demographics ==
Canada census – Shigawake community profile

	2021	2016	2011
Population	333 (+14.0% from 2016)	292 (-13.6% from 2011)	338 (-5.3% from 2006)
Land area	76.82 km^{2} (29.66 sq mi)	76.82 km^{2} (29.66 sq mi)	75.68 km^{2} (29.22 sq mi)
Population density	4.3/km^{2} (11/sq mi)	3.8/km^{2} (9.8/sq mi)	4.5/km^{2} (12/sq mi)
Median age	49.6 (M: 52.4, F: 48.0)	55.1 (M: 55.6, F: 54.3)	52.3 (M: 53.5, F: 51.2)
Private dwellings	167 (total) 144 (occupied)	171 (total)	163 (total)
Median household income	$55,600	$42,560	$.N/A

Notes: 2011 income data for this area has been suppressed for data quality or confidentiality reasons.
References: 2021 2016 2011

Historical Census Data - Shigawake, Quebec

Year	Pop.	±%
1931	578	—
1941	642	+11.1%
1951	604	−5.9%
1956	609	+0.8%
1961	550	−9.7%
1966	493	−10.4%

Year	Pop.	±%
1971	462	−6.3%
1976	516	+11.7%
1981	549	+6.4%
1986	492	−10.4%
1991	430	−12.6%
1996	302	−29.8%

Year	Pop.	±%
2001	372	+23.2%
2006	357	−4.0%
2011	338	−5.3%
2016	292	−13.6%
2021	333	+14.0%

Source: Statistics Canada

Mother tongue (2021):

- English as first language: 58.2%
- French as first language: 37.3%
- English and French as first language: 4.5%
- Other as first language: 0%

== Government ==
List of former mayors:

- John A. Le Callais (1925–1929)
- Claude A. Skene (1929–1933)
- James P. Robinson (1933–1935, 1937–1941)
- Garvin Almond (1935–1937)
- Earle Almond (1941–1949)
- Edmund Vautier (1949–1953)
- Gillis Hayes (1953–1957)
- George Sullivan (1957–1973)
- Garry Hayes (1973–1987)
- Kenneth Duguay (1987–2013)
- Denzil Ross (2013–2017)
- Colette Dow (2017–2021)
- Rolande Couture-Beebe (2021–present)

== Notable people ==
Major Sydney Valpy Radley-Walters of the Sherbrooke Fusiliers, who in World War II was credited with putting 18 enemy tanks and assault guns out of action, lived in Shigawake, .

== See also ==
- List of anglophone communities in Quebec
- List of municipalities in Quebec
