= Saint-Godefroi =

- Township municipality
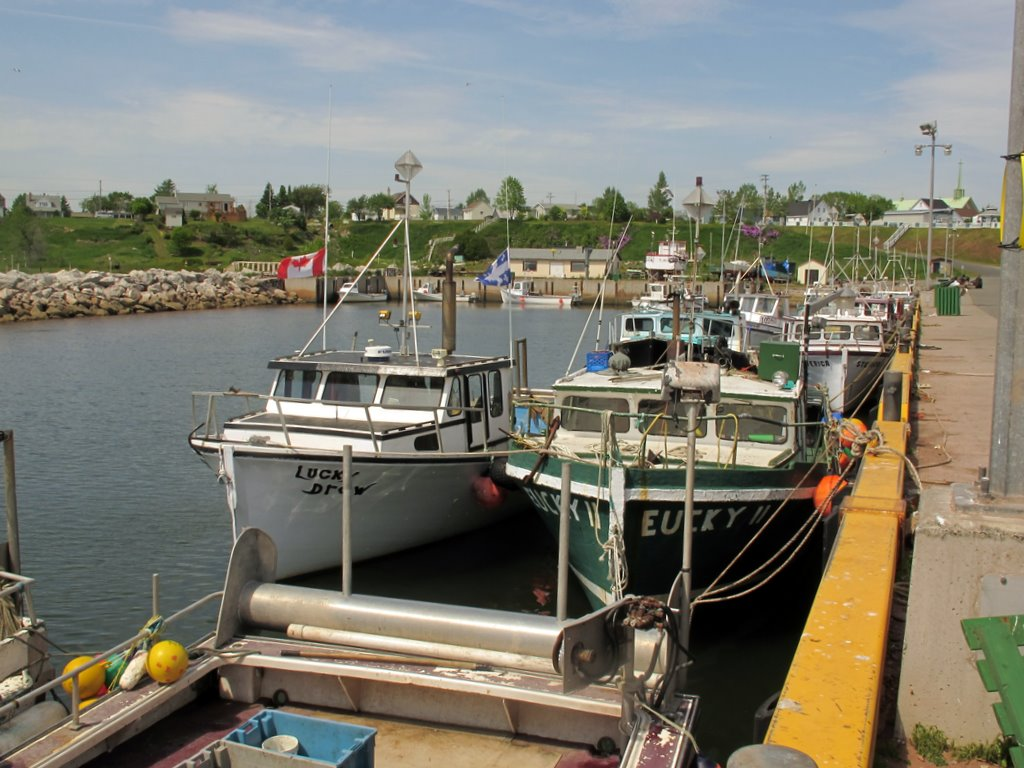
- Harbour at Saint-Godefroi

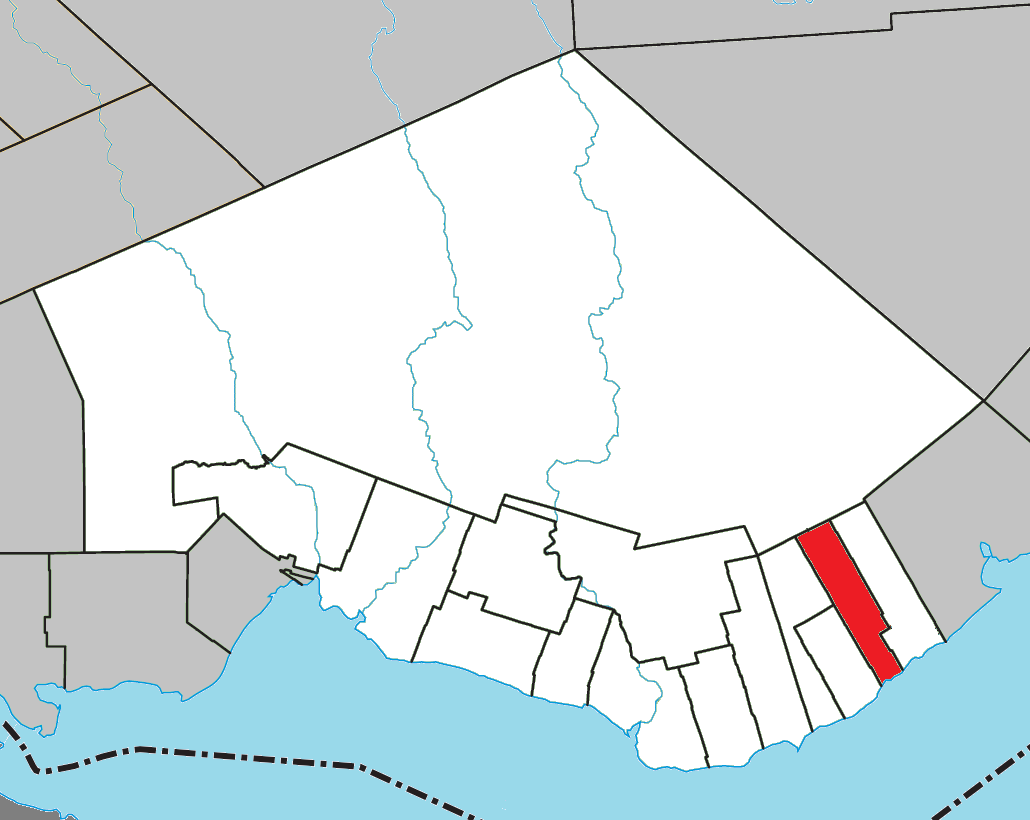
- Location within Bonaventure RCM

- Location in eastern Quebec
- Coordinates: 48°05′N 65°07′W
- Country: Canada
- Province: Quebec
- Region: Gaspésie– Îles-de-la-Madeleine
- RCM: Bonaventure
- Constituted: December 16, 1913

Government
  - Mayor: Gérard Litalien
  - Federal riding: Gaspésie—Les Îles-de-la-Madeleine—Listuguj
  - Prov. riding: Bonaventure

Area
  - Total: 64.07 km^{2} (24.74 sq mi)
  - Land: 63.57 km^{2} (24.54 sq mi)

Population (2021)
  - Total: 350
  - Density: 5.5/km^{2} (14/sq mi)
  - Pop (2016-21): ▼7.9%
  - Dwellings: 200
- Time zone: UTC−5 (EST)
  - Summer (DST): UTC−4 (EDT)
- Postal code(s): G0C 3C0
- Area codes: 418 and 581
- Highways: R-132
- Website: www.municipalitestgodefroi.com

Saint-Godefroi (French pronunciation: [sɛ̃ ɡɔdəfʁwa]; formerly spelled as Saint-Godefroy) is a township municipality in the Canadian province of Quebec, located within the Bonaventure Regional County Municipality. The township had a population of 350 in the 2021 Canadian census.

It is situated on the north shore of Chaleur Bay along Quebec Route 132. In addition to Saint-Godefroi itself, the township also includes the community of Kelly (48°6′53″N 65°8′7″W).

== History ==
Settlement began in the mid-19th century, and in 1873 the Parish of Saint-Godefroi was founded, named in honour of Charles-Godefroi Fournier (1829-1902), priest and founder of the parish. In 1889, its post office opened under the name of Saint-Godfroy.

On December 16, 1913, the Township Municipality of Saint-Godefroy was created when the Township Municipality of Hope was divided in two. In 1924, Saint-Godefroy lost more than half its area when the Municipality of Shigawake was formed. In 1940, the spelling of the post office name was adjusted to Saint-Godefroi, while the township's name was not corrected until much later (the 1981 census was the last census to use the spelling "Saint-Godefroy*).

== Demographics ==
In the 2021 Census of Population conducted by Statistics Canada, Saint-Godefroi had a population of 350 living in 177 of its 200 total private dwellings, a change of −7.9% from its 2016 population of 380. With a land area of 63.57 km^{2} (24.54 sq mi), it had a population density of 5.5/km^{2} (14.3/sq mi) in 2021.

Canada census – Saint-Godefroi community profile

| | 2021 | 2016 | 2011 |
| Population | 350 (-7.9% from 2016) | 380 (-6.2% from 2011) | 405 (+9.5% from 2006) |
| Land area | 63.57 km^{2} (24.54 sq mi) | 63.52 km^{2} (24.53 sq mi) | 64.41 km^{2} (24.87 sq mi) |
| Population density | 5.5/km^{2} (14/sq mi) | 6.0/km^{2} (16/sq mi) | 6.3/km^{2} (16/sq mi) |
| Median age | 59.6 (M: 60.4, F: 58.0) | 56.0 (M: 54.7, F: 57.6) | 54.6 (M: 53.4, F: 55.3) |
| Private dwellings | 200 (total) 177 (occupied) | 214 (total) 180 (occupied) | 217 (total) |
| Median household income | $54,800 | $46,848 | $.N/A |

Notes: 2011 income data for this area has been suppressed for data quality or confidentiality reasons.
References: 2021 2016 2011

Historical Census Data - Saint-Godefroi, Quebec

| Year | Pop. | ±% |
|---|---|---|
| 1921 | 1,409 | — |
| 1931 | 848 | −39.8% |
| 1941 | 923 | +8.8% |
| 1951 | 717 | −22.3% |
| 1956 | 801 | +11.7% |
| 1961 | 900 | +12.4% |

| Year | Pop. | ±% |
|---|---|---|
| 1966 | 891 | −1.0% |
| 1971 | 798 | −10.4% |
| 1976 | 718 | −10.0% |
| 1981 | 670 | −6.7% |
| 1986 | 582 | −13.1% |
| 1991 | 565 | −2.9% |

| Year | Pop. | ±% |
|---|---|---|
| 1996 | 488 | −13.6% |
| 2001 | 373 | −23.6% |
| 2006 | 370 | −0.8% |
| 2011 | 405 | +9.5% |
| 2016 | 380 | −6.2% |
| 2021 | 350 | −7.9% |

Population counts are not adjusted for boundary changes.
Source: Statistics Canada

Mother tongue (2021):

- English as first language: 10.0%
- French as first language: 87.1%
- English and French as first language: 1.4%
- Other as first language: 1.4%

== Local government ==
List of former mayors:

- Réginald Joseph (...–2005)
- Gérard-Raymond Blais (2005–2017)
- Grenade Grenier (2017–2022)
- Gérard Litalien (2022–present)

== See also ==
- List of anglophone communities in Quebec
- List of township municipalities in Quebec
