= Caplan, Quebec =

Caplan
- Municipality
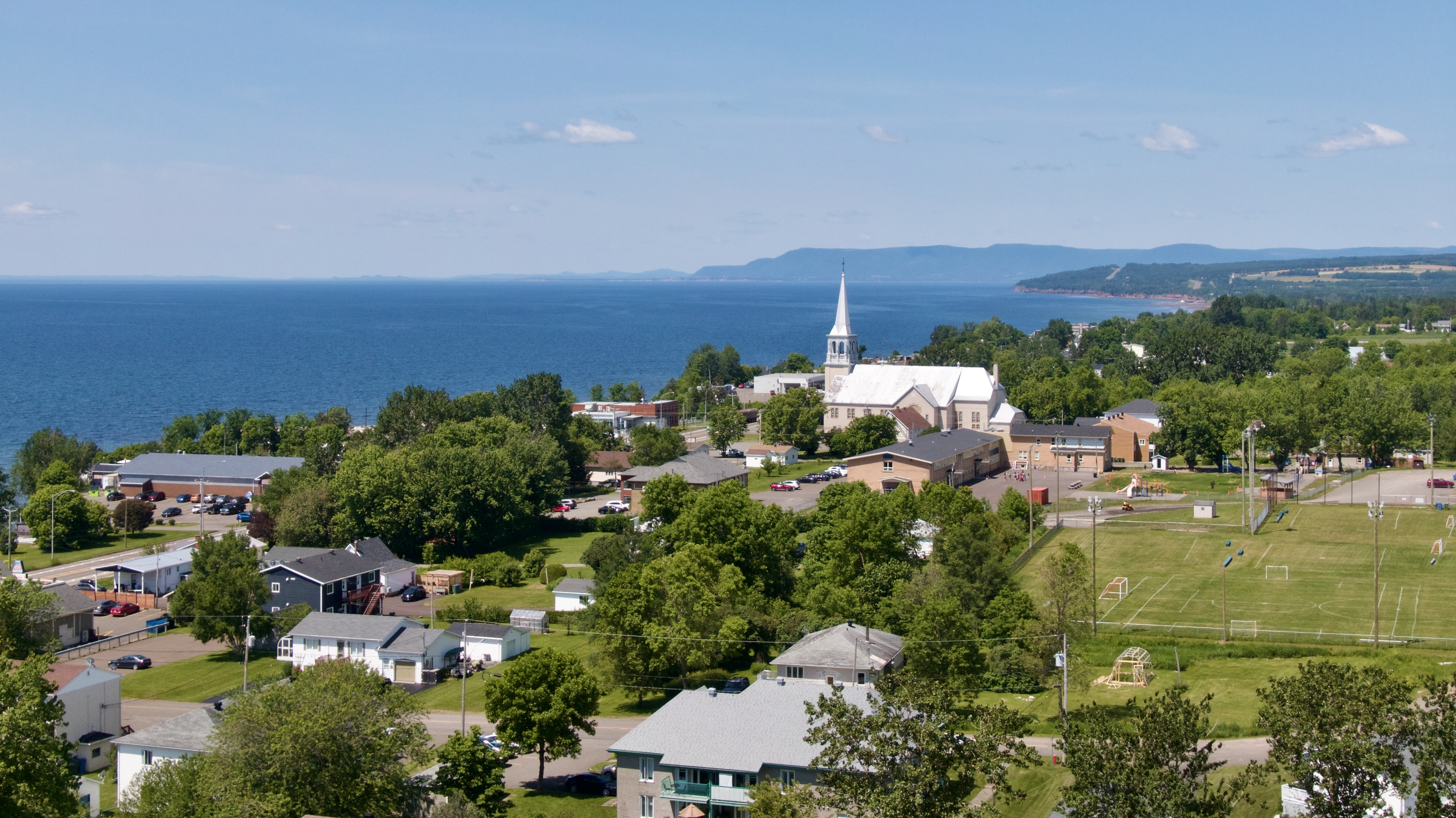
- Caplan skyline

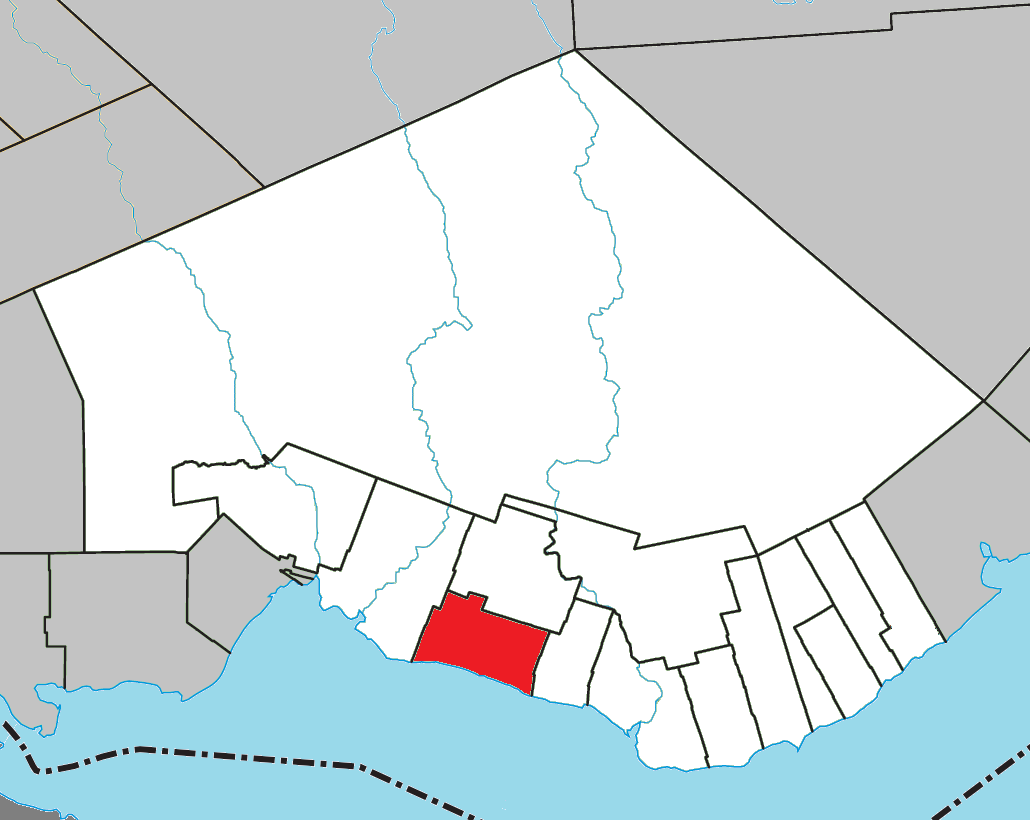
- Location within Bonaventure RCM

- Location in eastern Quebec
- Coordinates: 48°06′N 65°41′W
- Country: Canada
- Province: Quebec
- Region: Gaspésie– Îles-de-la-Madeleine
- RCM: Bonaventure
- Constituted: January 1, 1875

Government
  - Mayor: Lise Castilloux
  - Federal riding: Gaspésie—Les Îles-de-la-Madeleine—Listuguj
  - Prov. riding: Bonaventure

Area
  - Total: 85.715 km^{2} (33.095 sq mi)
  - Land: 85.69 km^{2} (33.09 sq mi)

Population (2021)
  - Total: 1,966
  - Density: 22.9/km^{2} (59/sq mi)
  - Pop (2016-21): ▼2.9%
  - Dwellings: 969
- Time zone: UTC−5 (EST)
  - Summer (DST): UTC−4 (EDT)
- Postal code(s): G0C 1H0
- Area codes: 418 and 581
- Highways: R-132
- Website: www.municipalite caplan.com

Caplan is a municipality in the Gaspésie–Îles-de-la-Madeleine region of the province of Quebec in Canada.

There are various explanations as to the origin of the name Caplan, including: a corruption of capelin or Cape Land; from the surname of a certain John Kaplan, an Indian who long camped at this location; or from the Mi'kmaq word gaplanjetig (meaning "capelin").

The place was incorporated in 1875 as the Parish Municipality of Saint-Charles-de-Caplan. In 1964, it changed its status and was renamed to Municipality of Caplan.

== Geography ==
=== Climate ===
Climate data for Caplan, Quebec
Month	Jan	Feb	Mar	Apr	May	Jun	Jul	Aug	Sep	Oct	Nov	Dec	Year
Record high °C (°F)	10.0 (50.0)	10.0 (50.0)	17.0 (62.6)	25.5 (77.9)	29.4 (84.9)	32.0 (89.6)	34.4 (93.9)	33.3 (91.9)	30.0 (86.0)	22.2 (72.0)	18.3 (64.9)	12.8 (55.0)	34.4 (93.9)
Mean daily maximum °C (°F)	−6.6 (20.1)	−4.7 (23.5)	0.5 (32.9)	6.7 (44.1)	14.3 (57.7)	19.8 (67.6)	22.7 (72.9)	22.1 (71.8)	17.0 (62.6)	10.6 (51.1)	3.4 (38.1)	−2.7 (27.1)	8.6 (47.5)
Daily mean °C (°F)	−11.3 (11.7)	−9.7 (14.5)	−4.2 (24.4)	2.4 (36.3)	9.1 (48.4)	14.6 (58.3)	17.8 (64.0)	17.1 (62.8)	12.4 (54.3)	6.5 (43.7)	0.1 (32.2)	−6.7 (19.9)	4.0 (39.2)
Mean daily minimum °C (°F)	−16 (3)	−14.7 (5.5)	−8.9 (16.0)	−1.9 (28.6)	4.0 (39.2)	9.3 (48.7)	12.9 (55.2)	12.1 (53.8)	7.8 (46.0)	2.4 (36.3)	−3.3 (26.1)	−10.6 (12.9)	−0.6 (30.9)
Record low °C (°F)	−33.0 (−27.4)	−29.4 (−20.9)	−28.5 (−19.3)	−18.0 (−0.4)	−6.1 (21.0)	−6.7 (19.9)	1.5 (34.7)	2.0 (35.6)	−3.3 (26.1)	−9.0 (15.8)	−21.0 (−5.8)	−27.5 (−17.5)	−33.0 (−27.4)
Average precipitation mm (inches)	79.8 (3.14)	55.7 (2.19)	60.4 (2.38)	64.0 (2.52)	91.8 (3.61)	86.7 (3.41)	99.8 (3.93)	95.5 (3.76)	79.0 (3.11)	88.5 (3.48)	86.0 (3.39)	69.6 (2.74)	956.7 (37.67)
Average rainfall mm (inches)	15.4 (0.61)	10.7 (0.42)	28.9 (1.14)	51.6 (2.03)	91.7 (3.61)	86.7 (3.41)	99.8 (3.93)	95.5 (3.76)	79.0 (3.11)	88.1 (3.47)	70.3 (2.77)	28.7 (1.13)	746.4 (29.39)
Average snowfall cm (inches)	64.4 (25.4)	45.1 (17.8)	31.5 (12.4)	13.6 (5.4)	0.1 (0.0)	0.0 (0.0)	0.0 (0.0)	0.0 (0.0)	0.0 (0.0)	0.4 (0.2)	15.6 (6.1)	40.8 (16.1)	211.5 (83.3)
Source: Environment Canada

== Demographics ==
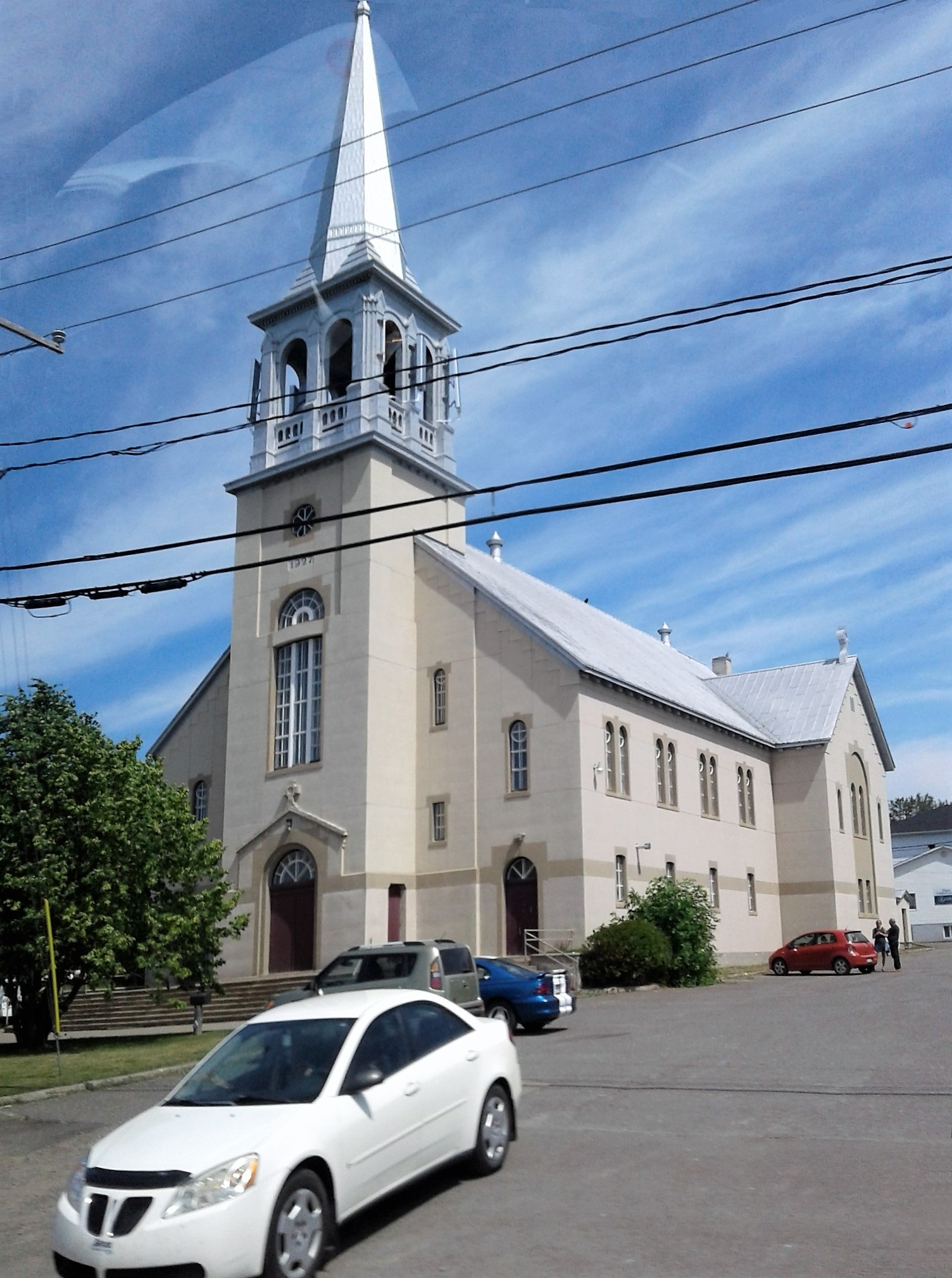
Saint Charles Church in Caplan

=== Population ===
Canada census – Caplan community profile

	2021	2016	2011
Population	1,966 (-2.9% from 2016)	2,024 (-0.7% from 2011)	2,039 (+8.2% from 2006)
Land area	85.69 km^{2} (33.09 sq mi)	85.31 km^{2} (32.94 sq mi)	85.87 km^{2} (33.15 sq mi)
Population density	22.9/km^{2} (59/sq mi)	23.7/km^{2} (61/sq mi)	23.7/km^{2} (61/sq mi)
Median age	56.4 (M: 56.0, F: 57.2)	52.8 (M: 52.0, F: 53.5)	51.8 (M: 51.9, F: 51.8)
Private dwellings	969 (total) 920 (occupied)	988 (total)	965 (total)
Median household income	$61,600	$52,565	$44,571

References: 2021 2016 2011

Historical Census Data - Caplan, Quebec

Year	Pop.	±%
1881	1,069	—
1891	1,305	+22.1%
1901	1,990	+52.5%
1911	1,756	−11.8%
1921	1,646	−6.3%
1931	1,582	−3.9%
1941	1,746	+10.4%
1951	1,805	+3.4%

Year	Pop.	±%
1956	1,913	+6.0%
1961	1,976	+3.3%
1966	2,036	+3.0%
1971	2,023	−0.6%
1976	1,935	−4.3%
1981	1,956	+1.1%
1986	2,076	+6.1%
1991	2,091	+0.7%

Year	Pop.	±%
1996	2,145	+2.6%
2001	2,010	−6.3%
2006	1,884	−6.3%
2011	2,039	+8.2%
2016	2,024	−0.7%
2021	1,966	−2.9%

Source: Statistics Canada

=== Language ===
Canada Census Mother Tongue Language - Caplan, Quebec
Census	French			English			French & English			Other		
Year	Count	Trend	Pop %	Count	Trend	Pop %	Count	Trend	Pop %	Count	Trend	Pop %
2021	1,880	▼2.8%	95.7%	60	▼7.7%	3.1%	10	0.0%	0.5%	15	▲50.0%	0.8%
2016	1,935	▲1.8%	95.6%	65	▲30.0%	3.2%	10	0.0%	0.5%	10	▲ n/a%	0.5%
2011	1,900	▲5.0%	96.9%	50	▲25.0%	2.6%	10	▲ n/a%	0.5%	0	▼100.0%	2.0%
2006	1,810	▼5.7%	96.5%	40	▲33.3%	2.1%	0	0.0%	0.0%	25	▲ n/a%	1.3%
2001	1,920	▼5.2%	98.5%	30	▼25.0%	1.5%	0	▼100.0%	0.0%	0	0.0%	0.0%
1996	2,025	n/a	97.1%	40	n/a	1.9%	20	n/a	1.0%	0	n/a	0.0%

== Education ==
The Eastern Shores School Board serves the municipality.

== See also ==
- List of municipalities in Quebec
