= Rivière-Bonaventure, Quebec =

Rivière-Bonaventure
- Unorganized territory
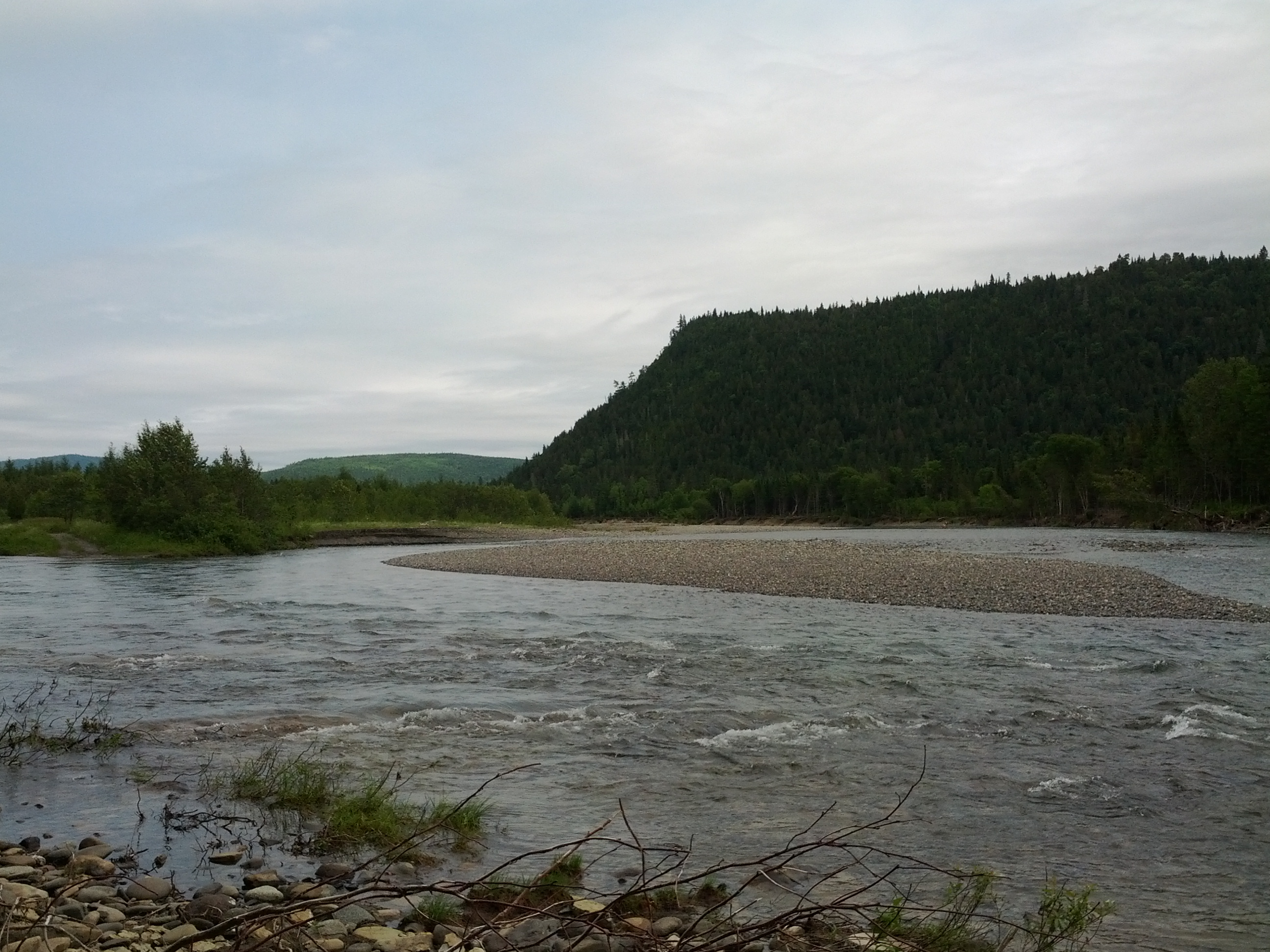

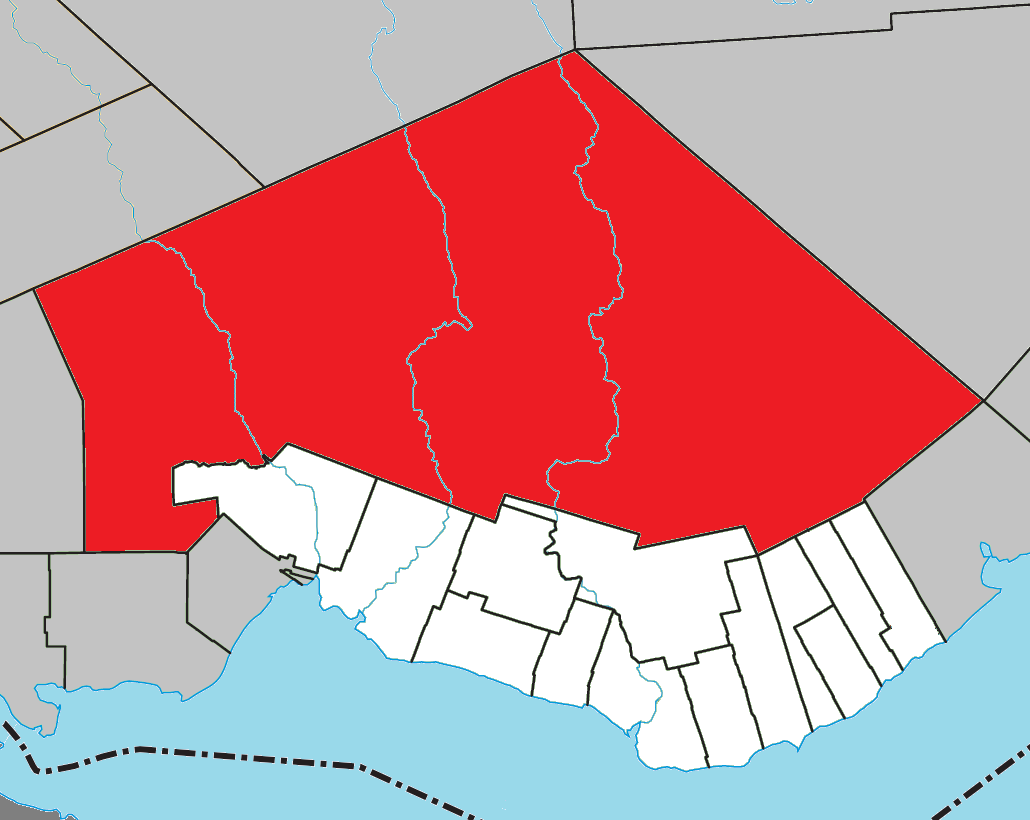
- Location within Bonaventure RCM

- Location in eastern Quebec
- Coordinates: 48°30′N 65°36′W
- Country: Canada
- Province: Quebec
- Region: Gaspésie– Îles-de-la-Madeleine
- RCM: Bonaventure
- Constituted: January 1, 1986

Government
  - Federal riding: Gaspésie—Les Îles-de-la-Madeleine—Listuguj
  - Prov. riding: Bonaventure

Area
  - Total: 3,077.054 km^{2} (1,188.057 sq mi)
  - Land: 3,054.37 km^{2} (1,179.30 sq mi)

Population (2021)
  - Total: 59
  - Density: 0/km^{2} (0/sq mi)
  - Pop (2016-21): ▲68.6%
  - Dwellings: 87
- Time zone: UTC-5 (EST)
  - Summer (DST): UTC-4 (EDT)
- Highways: R-299

Rivière-Bonaventure (French pronunciation: [ʁivjɛʁ bɔnavɑ̃tyʁ]) is an unorganized territory in the Gaspésie–Îles-de-la-Madeleine region of Quebec, Canada.

It is named after the 115 kilometres (71 mi) long Bonaventure River that bisects the territory from north to south.

== Demographics ==
Historical Census Data - Rivière-Bonaventure, Quebec

Year	Pop.	±%
1991	0	—
1996	0	0.00%
2001	0	0.00%
2006	35	—

Year	Pop.	±%
2011	25	−28.6%
2016	35	+40.0%
2021	59	+68.6%

Source: Statistics Canada

Private dwellings occupied by usual residents (2021): 36 (total dwellings: 87)

== See also ==
- List of unorganized territories in Quebec
