= Bonaventure Regional County Municipality =

Bonaventure
- Regional county municipality
- Coordinates: 48°03′N 65°29′W
- Country: Canada
- Province: Quebec
- Region: Gaspésie–Îles-de-la-Madeleine
- Effective: April 8, 1981
- County seat: New Carlisle

Government
  - Type: Prefecture
  - Prefect: Éric Dubé

Area
  - Total: 4,423.664 km^{2} (1,707.986 sq mi)
  - Land: 4,379.46 km^{2} (1,690.92 sq mi)

Population (2021)
  - Total: 17,557
  - Density: 4/km^{2} (10/sq mi)
  - Change (2016-21): ▼0.6%
  - Dwellings: 8,831
- Time zone: UTC−5 (EST)
  - Summer (DST): UTC−4 (EDT)
- Area codes: 418 and 581
- Website: mrcbonaventure.com

Bonaventure (French pronunciation: [bɔnavɑ̃tyʁ]) is a regional county municipality in the Gaspésie–Îles-de-la-Madeleine region of eastern Quebec, Canada, on the Gaspé Peninsula. Its seat is New Carlisle.

== Subdivisions ==
There are 14 subdivisions within the RCM:

Cities & Towns (3)

- Bonaventure
- New Richmond
- Paspébiac

Municipalities (7)

- Caplan
- Cascapédia–Saint-Jules
- Hope Town
- New Carlisle
- Saint-Alphonse
- Saint-Elzéar
- Shigawake

Parishes (1)

- Saint-Siméon

Townships (2)

- Hope
- Saint-Godefroi

Unorganized Territory (1)

- Rivière-Bonaventure

== Demographics ==
=== Population ===
Canada census – Bonaventure community profile

	2021	2016	2011
Population	17,557 (-0.6% from 2016)	17,660 (-1.9% from 2011)	18,000 (+0.3% from 2006)
Land area	4,379.46 km^{2} (1,690.92 sq mi)	4,379.40 km^{2} (1,690.90 sq mi)	4,375.27 km^{2} (1,689.30 sq mi)
Population density	4.0/km^{2} (10/sq mi)	4.0/km^{2} (10/sq mi)	4.1/km^{2} (11/sq mi)
Median age	53.6 (M: 52.4, F: 54.4)	52.3 (M: 51.5, F: 52.9)	50.1 (M: 49.4, F: 50.7)
Private dwellings	8,831 (total) 8,194 (occupied)	8,744 (total)	8,525 (total)
Median household income	$62,400	$53,346	$47,827

References: 2021 2016 2011

Historical Census Data - Bonaventure Regional County Municipality, Quebec

Year	Pop.	±%
1991	19,848	—
1996	19,550	−1.5%
2001	18,267	−6.6%
2006	17,948	−1.7%

Year	Pop.	±%
2011	18,000	+0.3%
2016	17,660	−1.9%
2021	17,557	−0.6%

Source: Statistics Canada

=== Language ===
Canada Census Mother Tongue - Bonaventure Regional County Municipality, Quebec
Census	Total	French			English			French & English			Other		
Year	Responses	Count	Trend	Pop %	Count	Trend	Pop %	Count	Trend	Pop %	Count	Trend	Pop %
2016	17,445	14,700	▼1.4%	84.3%	2,515	▼4.9%	14.4%	160	▲10.3%	0.82%	70	▲40.0%	0.4%
2011	17,755	14,915	▲1.7%	84.00%	2,645	▼5.4%	14.90%	145	▲107.1%	0.82%	50	▼75.0%	0.28%
2006	17,730	14,665	▼3.3%	82.71%	2,795	▲10.7%	15.76%	70	▼74.1%	0.40%	200	▲566.7%	1.13%
2001	17,995	15,170	▼7.9%	84.30%	2,525	▼10.5%	14.03%	270	▲157.1%	1.50%	30	▲100.0%	0.17%
1996	19,410	16,470	n/a	84.85%	2,820	n/a	14.53%	105	n/a	0.54%	15	n/a	0.08%

== Transportation ==
=== Access Routes ===
Highways and numbered routes that run through the municipality, including external routes that start or finish at the county border:

- Autoroutes
  - None
- Principal Highways
  - R-132
- Secondary Highways
  - R-299
- External Routes
  - None

== Attractions ==
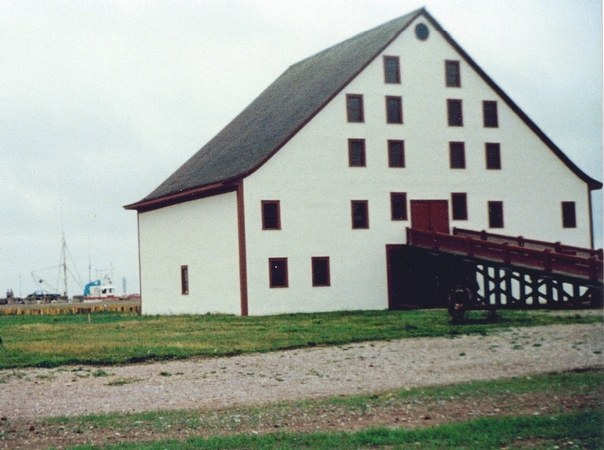
Banc-de-Paspébiac Historical Site

- Banc-de-Paspébiac Historical Site (Paspébiac)
- Bonaventure Airport (Bonaventure)
- Canomore Hydro (Saint-Elzéar)
- Gaspésie Biopark/Acadian Museum of Quebec (Bonaventure)
- Gaspésie British Heritage Centre (New Richmond)
- Hamilton House (1852) (New Carlisle)
- Pin-Rouge Ski Area (New Richmond)
- Saint-Elzéar Cave (Saint-Elzéar)
- St-Edgar Covered Bridge (1938) (New Richmond)

== Protected Areas ==
- Petite-Cascapédia Wildlife Reserve
- Port-Daniel Wildlife Reserve
  - MLPC Campaign Post
- Rivière-Bonaventure ZEC
- Rivière-Cascapédia Wildlife Reserve
- Rivière-Port-Daniel Wildlife Reserve

== See also ==
- List of regional county municipalities and equivalent territories in Quebec
