= Dansereau =

Dansereau is a surname. Notable people with the surname include:

- Alain Dansereau (born 1954), Canadian fencer
- Fernand Dansereau (born 1928), Canadian film director and film producer
- Georges Dansereau (1867–1934), Canadian provincial politician
- Georges-Étienne Dansereau (1898–1959), Canadian politician
- Madeleine Dansereau (1922–1991), Canadian artist and educator
- Mireille Dansereau (born 1943), Canadian director and screenwriter
- Pierre Dansereau (1911–2011), Canadian ecologist
