= Brownsburg =

Brownsburg may refer to:

== Canada ==
- Brownsburg, Quebec, a former municipality now part of Brownsburg-Chatham

== United States ==
- Brownsburg, Indiana
- Brownsburg, Pennsylvania, see Brownsburg Village Historic District
- Brownsburg, Virginia
- Brownsburg, West Virginia
