= Yves St-Denis =

Canadian politician (1963–2024)

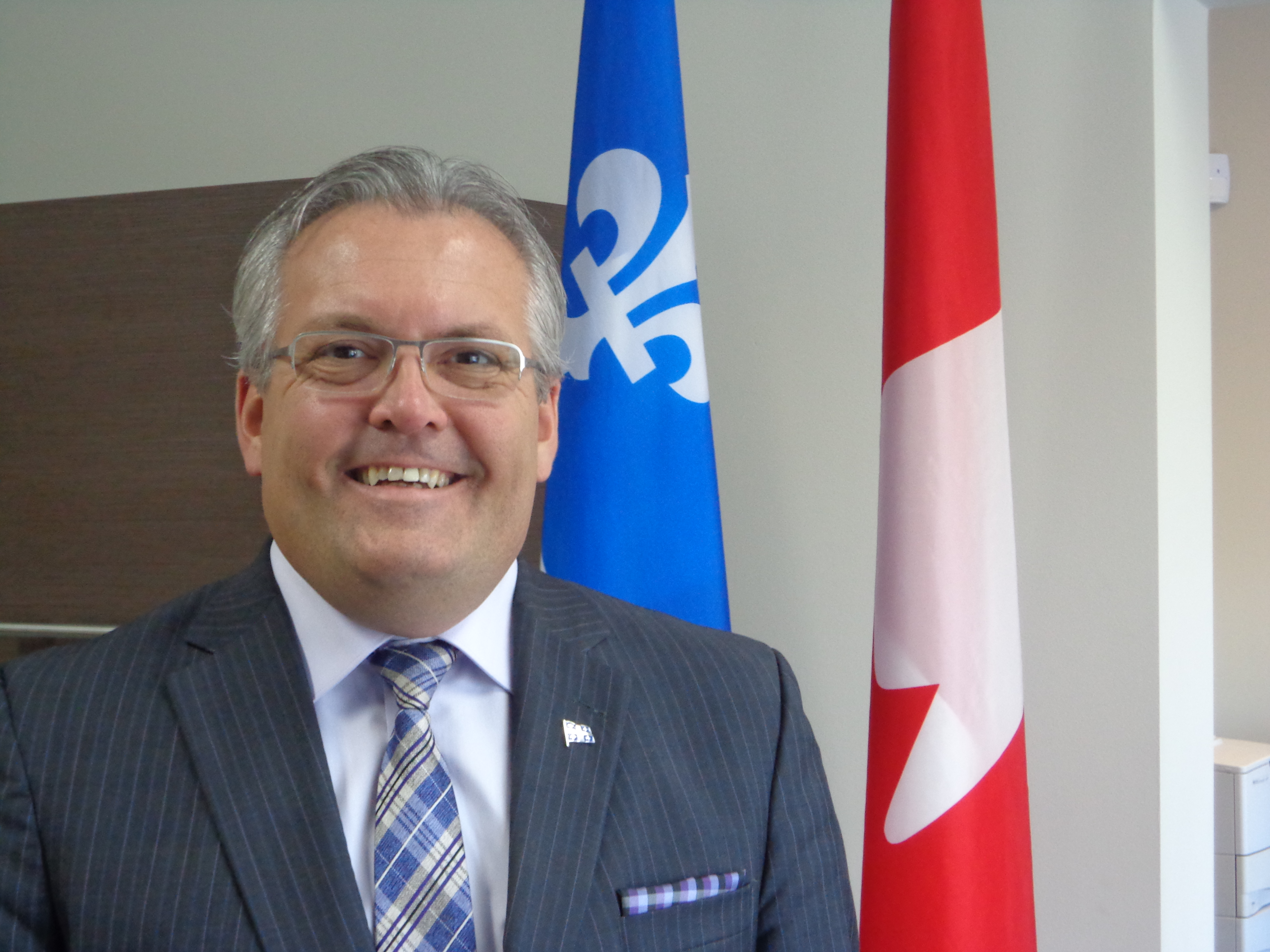

Member of the National Assembly of Quebec for Argenteuil
- In office 7 April 2014 – 1 October 2018
- Preceded by: Roland Richer
- Succeeded by: Agnès Grondin

Personal details
- Born: 1 December 1963
- Died: 19 January 2024 (aged 60) Dominican Republic
- Party: Quebec Liberal Party

Yves St-Denis (1 December 1963 – 19 January 2024) was a Canadian politician in Quebec, who was elected to the National Assembly of Quebec in the 2014 election. He represented the electoral district of Argenteuil as a member of the Quebec Liberal Party.

== Biography ==
From 1986 to 2007, St-Denis was the owner of a telecommunications firm, in Terrebonne. From 2007, he also possessed an amusement center as well as a storage company. Amid other interests, in 1998, he was elected school commissioner, for the Commission scolaire des Affluents. In 2007, he was elected President of this same school board until his election as MNA for Argenteuil in 2014.

St-Denis died on 19 January 2024, at the age of 60.

== Provincial political career ==
On 13 May 2013, St-Denis was elected councillor for the Argenteuil Liberal Association's executive committee. Provincial riding associations represent the Provincial Liberal Party and participate in the general decision-making by sending delegates to varied conventions and congresses.

On 6 October 2013, at the liberal nomination convention held at the Lachute Golf Club, St-Denis was elected as the official candidate for the Quebec Liberal Party to represent Argenteuil in the next election . At that time, Argenteuil was represented by Parti québécois member of the National Assembly, Roland Richer, elected during the partial election of 2012.

At the dissolution of the National Assembly, on 5 March 2014, the Argenteuil Liberal Association offices on Main Street, Lachute, became St-Denis' official campaign headquarters.

On 30 March 2014, less than seven days before the election, St-Denis held a liberal gathering at the Lachute Golf Club, with Philippe Couillard and Lise Thériault as invited guest speakers. Up to 800 partisans participated.

On 7 April 2014, at the provincial general election, St-Denis won the riding of Argenteuil with 38.25% of the vote, thus returning Argenteuil under the Quebec Liberal Party banner.

St-Denis' riding office in Lachute was formerly occupied by David Whissell, and Roland Richer.
