= Roland Richer =

Canadian politician

MNA for Argenteuil
- In office 11 June 2012 – 2014
- Preceded by: David Whissell
- Succeeded by: Yves St-Denis

Personal details
- Born: 23 June 1941 (age 84)
- Party: Parti Québécois

Roland Richer (born 23 June 1941) is a Canadian politician, who was a Parti Québécois member of the National Assembly of Quebec for Argenteuil electoral district from 2012 to 2014

Richer was formerly a schoolteacher and school principal. He was elected in a by-election held on 11 June 2012, which was triggered by the resignation of David Whissell on 16 December 2011, in a close race against Quebec Liberal Party candidate Lise Proulx. The result of the by-election was considered a surprise, as Argenteuil had been a safe seat for the Quebec Liberal Party for several decades. Coalition Avenir Québec candidate Mario Laframboise came in third.

Richer was reelected in the 2012 general election, again defeating Proulx and Laframboise.

== Electoral record ==
Quebec provincial by-election, 11 June 2012
Party	Candidate	Votes	%	±%
Parti Québécois	Roland Richer	6,631	36.38	+2.76
Liberal	Lise Proulx	6,038	33.12	-16.46
Coalition Avenir Québec	Mario Laframboise	3,905	21.42	+10.18*
Green	Claude Sabourin	549	3.01	-0.47
Québec solidaire	Yvan Zanetti	500	2.74	+0.65
Option nationale	Patrick Sabourin	238	1.31	–
Conservative	Jean Lecavalier	189	1.04	–
Independent	Georges Lapointe	152	0.83	–
Autonomist Team	Gérald Nicolas	26	0.14	–
Total valid votes		18,228	98.78	–
Total rejected ballots		225	1.22	–
Turnout		18,453	42.48	-11.69
Electors on the lists		43,441	–	–

* Result compared to Action démocratique
