= Zoël =

Zoël is a masculine given name. Notable people with the name include:

- Zoël Amberg (born 1992), Swiss racing driver
- Zoël Saindon (1919–1998), Canadian politician

== See also ==
- Noel (given name)
