= John Hay (Canadian politician) =

Canadian politician

Member of the Legislative Assembly of Quebec for Argenteuil
- In office 1910–1912
- Preceded by: William Alexander Weir
- Succeeded by: Harry Slater
- In office 1916–1925
- Preceded by: Harry Slater
- Succeeded by: Joseph-Léon Saint-Jacques

Personal details
- Born: June 26, 1862 Chatham, Canada East
- Died: January 16, 1925 (aged 62) Lachute, Quebec
- Party: Liberal

John Hay (June 26, 1862 – January 16, 1925) was a Canadian politician.

Born in Chatham, Canada East, Hay was a farmer. He was mayor of Lachute from 1907 to 1909. He ran unsuccessfully for the Legislative Assembly of Quebec in the riding of Argenteuil in 1892. He was elected in a 1910 by-election and was defeated in 1912. A Liberal, he was elected in 1916 and served until his death in 1925 in Lachute.
