= Robert Meikle =

Robert Meikle may refer to:

- Robert Desmond Meikle (1923–2021), Irish botanist
- Robert Greenshields Meikle (c. 1832–1901), merchant and political figure in Quebec
