= William Owens (Canadian politician) =

Canadian politician

Hon. William Owens
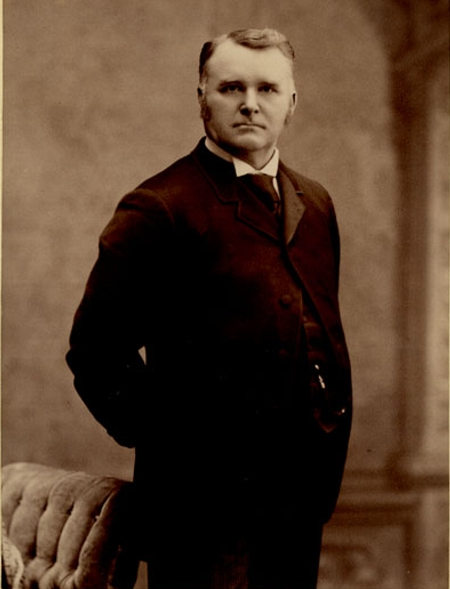

Senator for Inkerman, Quebec
- In office January 2, 1896 – June 8, 1917
- Appointed by: Mackenzie Bowell
- Preceded by: John Joseph Caldwell Abbott
- Succeeded by: Richard Smeaton White

Member of the Legislative Assembly of Quebec for Argenteuil
- In office 1881–1892
- Preceded by: Robert Greenshields Meikle
- Succeeded by: William John Simpson

Personal details
- Born: May 15, 1840 Stonefield, Lower Canada
- Died: June 8, 1917 (aged 77) Westmount, Quebec
- Party: Conservative
- Occupation: Merchant

William Owens (May 15, 1840 – June 8, 1917) was a Canadian politician.

Born in Stonefield, County of Argenteuil, Canada East, the son of Owen Owens and Charlotte Lindley, Owens was a lieutenant in the Active Militia. He was also mayor, councillor and postmaster of the Township of Chatham. He was elected to the Legislative Assembly of Quebec in the 1881 Quebec general election as the Conservative candidate in the riding of Argenteuil. He was acclaimed in 1886 and re-elected in 1890. He resigned in 1891. He was appointed to the Senate on the advice of Mackenzie Bowell representing the senatorial division of Inkerman, Quebec on January 2, 1896. A Conservative, he served 21 years until his death in 1917.

1891 Canadian federal election: Argenteuil
Party	Candidate	Votes	%	±%
Liberal	Thomas Christie	1,050	55.32	
Conservative	William Owens	848	44.68	
