= William John Simpson =

Canadian politician

Member of the Legislative Assembly of Quebec for Argenteuil
- In office 1892–1897
- Preceded by: William Owens
- Succeeded by: William Alexander Weir

Personal details
- Born: November 23, 1851 Lachute, Canada East
- Died: October 27, 1901 (aged 49) Lachute, Quebec
- Party: Conservative

William John Simpson (November 23, 1851 – October 27, 1901) was a journalist, insurance agent and political figure in Quebec. He represented Argenteuil in the Legislative Assembly of Quebec from 1892 to 1897 as a Conservative.

He was born in Lachute, Canada East, the son of John Simpson and Jane Dey, and was educated at the Collège de Lachute. Simpson published The Watchman and Ottawa Valley Advocate. In 1874, he married Mary Fitzgerald. He served in the Argenteuil Rangers, retiring at the rank of lieutenant. Simpson was also master of the local Masonic lodge. He was secretary-treasurer for the Lachute municipal council from 1886 to 1889. Simpson was defeated when he ran for reelection in 1897; he ran unsuccessfully as the Conservative candidate for a federal seat for Argenteuil in 1900. He died in Lachute at the age of 49.
