= William McOuat Cottingham =

Canadian politician

Member of the Legislative Assembly of Quebec for Argenteuil
- In office 1948–1966
- Preceded by: Georges-Étienne Dansereau
- Succeeded by: Zoël Saindon

Personal details
- Born: January 8, 1905 Lachute, Quebec
- Died: March 20, 1983 (aged 78) Montreal, Quebec
- Party: Union Nationale

William McOuat Cottingham (January 8, 1905 – March 20, 1983) was a Canadian provincial politician. He was the Union Nationale member of the Legislative Assembly of Quebec for Argenteuil from 1948 to 1966. He was the Minister of Mines from 1954 to 1960. He was also mayor of Saint-Jérusalem-d'Argenteuil (Lachute), Quebec from 1951 to 1953.
