= Argenteuil (provincial electoral district) =

Provincial electoral district in Quebec, Canada

Coordinates: 45.7°N 74.2°W

Quebec electoral district
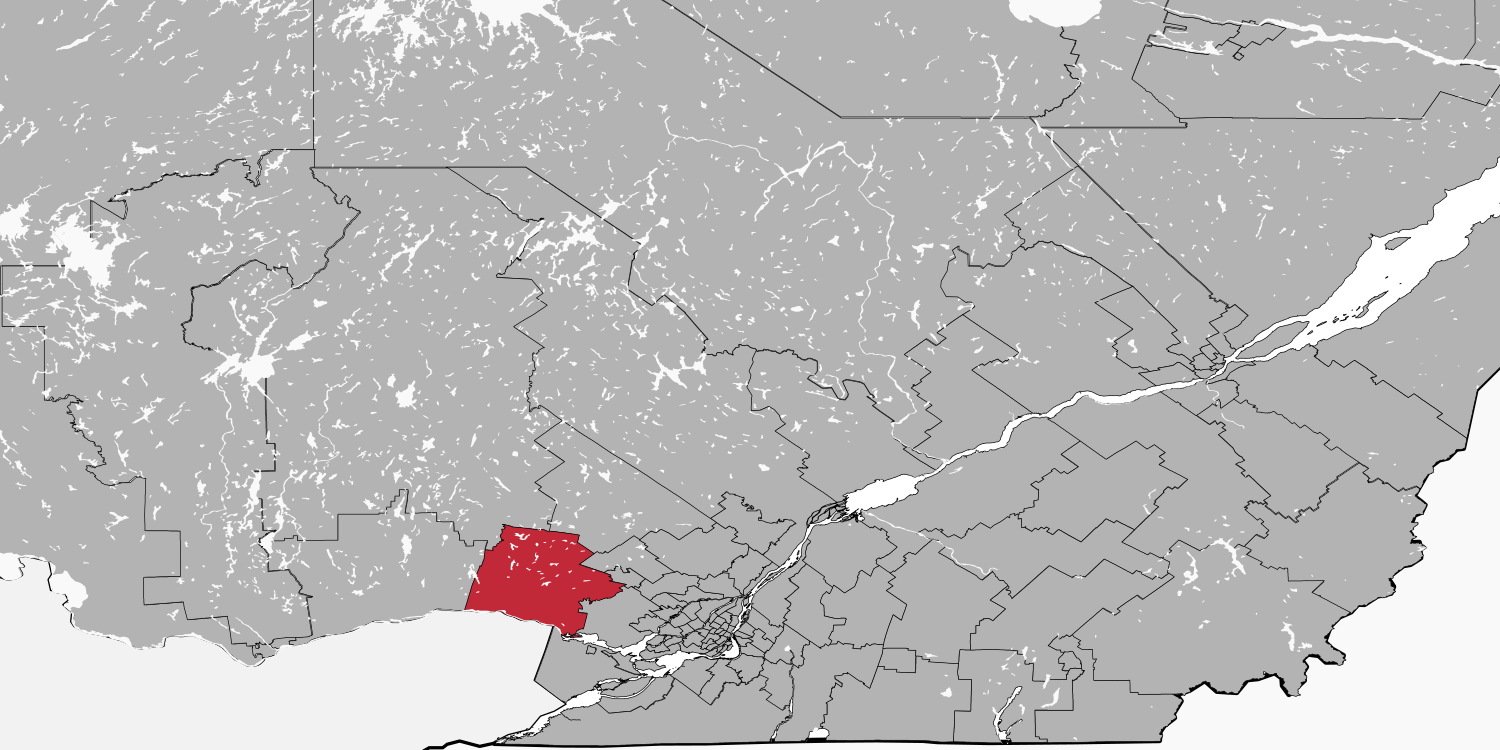

Provincial electoral district
- Legislature: National Assembly of Quebec
MNA
Pierre Nantel
Parti Québécois
- District created: 1867
- First contested: 1867
- Last contested: 2026

Demographics
- Population (2011): 56,080
- Electors (2012): 43,789
- Area (km²): 2,040.6
- Pop. density (per km²): 27.5
- Census division(s): Argenteuil (all), La Rivière-du-Nord (part), Les Laurentides (part), Les Pays-d'en-Haut (part)
- Census subdivision(s): Arundel, Barkmere, Brownsburg-Chatham, Gore, Grenville, Grenville-sur-la-Rouge, Harrington, Lac-des-Seize-Îles, Lachute, Mille-Isles, Montcalm, Morin-Heights, Saint-Adolphe-d'Howard, Saint-André-d'Argenteuil, Saint-Placide, Wentworth, Wentworth-Nord

Argenteuil (French pronunciation: [aʁʒɑ̃tœj]) is a provincial electoral district in the Laurentides region of Quebec, Canada, that elects members to the National Assembly of Quebec. It notably includes the municipalities of Lachute, Brownsburg-Chatham, and Morin-Heights.

It was created for the 1867 election, and an electoral district of that name existed even earlier: see Argenteuil (Province of Canada).

The territory of the Argenteuil electoral district in the 2011 electoral map is unchanged from its territory in the 2001 electoral map. From 1992 to 2001, the riding also included the municipalities of Mirabel and Huberdeau.

== Members of the Legislative Assembly / National Assembly ==
| Legislature | Years | Member | Party |
|---|---|---|---|
| 1st | 1867–1871 | Sydney Robert Bellingham | Conservative |
| 2nd | 1871–1875 | Sydney Robert Bellingham | Conservative |
| 3rd | 1875–1878 | Sydney Robert Bellingham | Conservative |
| 4th | 1878–1881 | Robert Greenshields Meikle | Liberal |
| 5th | 1881–1886 | William Owens | Conservative |
| 6th | 1886–1890 | William Owens | Conservative |
| 7th | 1890–1892 | William Owens | Conservative |
| 8th | 1892–1897 | William John Simpson | Conservative |
| 9th | 1897–1900 | William Alexander Weir | Liberal |
| 10th | 1900–1904 | William Alexander Weir | Liberal |
| 11th | 1904–1908 | William Alexander Weir | Liberal |
| 12th | 1908–1910 | William Alexander Weir | Liberal |
| 12th | 1910–1912 | John Hay | Liberal |
| 13th | 1912–1916 | Harry Slater | Conservative |
| 14th | 1916–1919 | John Hay | Liberal |
| 15th | 1919–1923 | John Hay | Liberal |
| 16th | 1923–1925† | John Hay | Liberal |
| 16th | 1925–1927 | Joseph-Léon Saint-Jacques | Conservative |
| 17th | 1927–1931 | Georges Dansereau | Liberal |
| 18th | 1931–1934† | Georges Dansereau | Liberal |
| 19th | 1935–1936 | Georges-Étienne Dansereau | Liberal |
| 20th | 1936–1939 | Georges-Étienne Dansereau | Liberal |
| 21st | 1939–1944 | Georges-Étienne Dansereau | Liberal |
| 22nd | 1944–1948 | Georges-Étienne Dansereau | Liberal |
| 23rd | 1948–1952 | William McOuat Cottingham | Union Nationale |
| 24th | 1952–1956 | William McOuat Cottingham | Union Nationale |
| 25th | 1956–1960 | William McOuat Cottingham | Union Nationale |
| 26th | 1960–1962 | William McOuat Cottingham | Union Nationale |
| 27th | 1962–1966 | William McOuat Cottingham | Union Nationale |
| 28th | 1966–1970 | Zoël Saindon | Liberal |
| 29th | 1970–1973 | Zoël Saindon | Liberal |
| 30th | 1973–1976 | Zoël Saindon | Liberal |
| 31st | 1976–1978 | Zoël Saindon | Liberal |
| 31st | 1979–1981 | Claude Ryan | Liberal |
| 32nd | 1981–1985 | Claude Ryan | Liberal |
| 33rd | 1985–1989 | Claude Ryan | Liberal |
| 34th | 1989–1994 | Claude Ryan | Liberal |
| 35th | 1994–1997 | Régent Beaudet | Liberal |
| 36th | 1998–2003 | David Whissell | Liberal |
| 37th | 2003–2007 | David Whissell | Liberal |
| 38th | 2007–2008 | David Whissell | Liberal |
| 39th | 2008–2011 | David Whissell | Liberal |
| 39th | 2012–2012 | Roland Richer | Parti Québécois |
| 40th | 2012–2014 | Roland Richer | Parti Québécois |
| 41st | 2014–2018 | Yves St-Denis | Liberal |
| 42nd | 2018–2022 | Agnès Grondin | Coalition Avenir Québec |
| 43rd | 2022–2026 | Agnès Grondin | Coalition Avenir Québec |
| 44th | 2026–Present | Pierre Nantel | Parti Québécois |

== Geography ==
It consists of the municipalities of:

- Arundel
- Barkmere
- Brownsburg-Chatham
- Gore
- Grenville
- Grenville-sur-la-Rouge
- Harrington
- Lac-des-Seize-Îles
- Lachute
- Mille-Isles
- Montcalm
- Morin-Heights
- Saint-Adolphe-d'Howard
- Saint-André-d'Argenteuil
- Saint-Colomban
- Wentworth
- Wentworth-Nord

== Linguistic demographics ==
- Francophone: 84.6%
- Anglophone: 13.3%
- Allophone: 2.2%

== Electoral results ==
2026 Quebec general election
** Preliminary results — Not yet official **
| Party | Candidate | Votes | % | ±% |
|---|---|---|---|---|
| Parti Québécois | Pierre Nantel | 8,956 | 33.14 | +16.93 |
| Liberal | Émilie Jutras | 6,923 | 25.61 | +15.43 |
| Conservative | Marie-France Lemay | 5,437 | 20.12 | +5.40 |
| Coalition Avenir Québec | Julie-Andrée Numainville | 3,096 | 11.45 | –33.65 |
| Québec solidaire | Pénéloppe Dagenais-Lavoie | 1,880 | 6.96 | –3.83 |
| Independent | Brigitte Roy | 415 | 1.54 | N/A |
| Canadian | Esber Khalil Esber | 122 | 0.45 | –0.89 |
| Independent | Margaret Ethel Brunton | 102 | 0.38 | N/A |
| Osons Québec | Martin Charron | 97 | 0.36 | N/A |
| Total valid votes | | 27,028 | 98.46 | –0.05 |
| Total rejected ballots | | 422 | 1.54 | +0.05 |
| Turnout | | 43,063 | 63.74 | –0.43 |
| Electors on the lists | | 43,063 | | |
| Parti Québécois gain from Coalition Avenir Québec | | Swing | | +0.75 |
Source: Élections Québec

2022 Quebec general election
| Party | Candidate | Votes | % | ±% |
|---|---|---|---|---|
| Coalition Avenir Québec | Agnès Grondin | 14,725 | 45.10 | +6.23 |
| Parti Québécois | François Girard | 5,291 | 16.21 | -4.93 |
| Conservative | Karim Elayoubi | 4,807 | 14.72 | +13.17 |
| Québec solidaire | Marcel Lachaine | 3,523 | 10.79 | -1.38 |
| Liberal | Philippe LeBel | 3,325 | 10.18 | -7.23 |
| Canadian | Jean Lalonde | 436 | 1.34 | – |
| Green | Luis Alvarez | 429 | 1.31 | -0.50 |
| Démocratie directe | Marie-Eve Milot | 113 | 0.35 | – |
| Total valid votes | | 32,649 | 98.51 | – |
| Total rejected ballots | | 495 | 1.49 | +0.02 |
| Turnout | | 33,144 | 64.17 | -1.16 |
| Electors on the lists | | 51,647 | – | – |
| Coalition Avenir Québec hold | | Swing | | +5.58 |

2018 Quebec general election
| Party | Candidate | Votes | % | ±% |
|---|---|---|---|---|
| Coalition Avenir Québec | Agnès Grondin | 11,848 | 38.88 | +15.26 |
| Parti Québécois | Patrick Côté | 6,443 | 21.14 | -10.67 |
| Liberal | Bernard Bigras-Denis | 5,306 | 17.41 | -20.84 |
| Québec solidaire | Céline Lachapelle | 3,710 | 12.17 | +7.6 |
| Independent | Yves St-Denis | 1,778 | 5.83 | |
| Green | Carole Thériault | 552 | 1.81 | +0.6 |
| Conservative | Sherwin Edwards | 472 | 1.55 | |
| Parti libre | Stéphanie Boyer | 233 | 0.76 | |
| Citoyens au pouvoir | Louise Wiseman | 135 | 0.44 | |
| Total valid votes | | 30,477 | 98.52 | |
| Total rejected ballots | | 457 | 1.48 | |
| Turnout | | 30,934 | 65.33 | |
| Eligible voters | | 47,351 | | |
| Coalition Avenir Québec gain from Liberal | | Swing | | +12.97 |
Source(s) "Rapport des résultats officiels du scrutin". Élections Québec.

2014 Quebec general election
| Party | Candidate | Votes | % | ±% |
|---|---|---|---|---|
| Liberal | Yves St-Denis | 11,676 | 38.25 | +9.20 |
| Parti Québécois | Roland Richer | 9,711 | 31.81 | -6.71 |
| Coalition Avenir Québec | Nicole Chouinard | 7,212 | 23.62 | -2.88 |
| Québec solidaire | Clotilde Bertrand | 1,395 | 4.57 | +1.92 |
| Green | Rouge Lefebvre | 370 | 1.21 | -0.81 |
| Option nationale | Samuel Cloutier | 112 | 0.37 | -0.90 |
| Mon pays le Québec | Serge Dupré | 51 | 0.17 | – |
| Total valid votes | | 30,527 | 98.57 | – |
| Total rejected ballots | | 443 | 1.43 | – |
| Turnout | | 30,970 | 68.93 | -5.40 |
| Electors on the lists | | 44,931 | – | – |
| Liberal gain from Parti Québécois | | Swing | | +7.96 |

2012 Quebec general election
| Party | Candidate | Votes | % | ±% |
|---|---|---|---|---|
| Parti Québécois | Roland Richer | 12,449 | 38.52 | +2.14 |
| Liberal | Lise Proulx | 9,387 | 29.05 | -4.07 |
| Coalition Avenir Québec | Mario Laframboise | 8,564 | 26.50 | +5.08 |
| Québec solidaire | Yvan Zanetti | 855 | 2.65 | -0.09 |
| Green | Stephen Matthews | 653 | 2.02 | -0.99 |
| Option nationale | Patrick Sabourin | 409 | 1.27 | -0.04 |
| Total valid votes | | 32,317 | 99.04 | – |
| Total rejected ballots | | 314 | 0.96 | – |
| Turnout | | 32,631 | 74.33 | +31.85 |
| Electors on the lists | | 43,902 | – | – |

Quebec provincial by-election, June 11, 2012
| Party | Candidate | Votes | % | ±% |
|---|---|---|---|---|
| Parti Québécois | Roland Richer | 6,631 | 36.38 | +2.76 |
| Liberal | Lise Proulx | 6,038 | 33.12 | -16.46 |
| Coalition Avenir Québec | Mario Laframboise | 3,905 | 21.42 | +10.18* |
| Green | Claude Sabourin | 549 | 3.01 | -0.47 |
| Québec solidaire | Yvan Zanetti | 500 | 2.74 | +0.65 |
| Option nationale | Patrick Sabourin | 238 | 1.31 | – |
| Conservative | Jean Lecavalier | 189 | 1.04 | – |
| Independent | Georges Lapointe | 152 | 0.83 | – |
| Autonomist Team | Gérald Nicolas | 26 | 0.14 | – |
| Total valid votes | | 18,228 | 98.78 | – |
| Total rejected ballots | | 225 | 1.22 | – |
| Turnout | | 18,453 | 42.48 | -11.69 |
| Electors on the lists | | 43,441 | – | – |

* Result compared to Action démocratique

2008 Quebec general election
| Party | Candidate | Votes | % | ±% |
|---|---|---|---|---|
| Liberal | David Whissell | 10,843 | 49.58 | +11.99 |
| Parti Québécois | John Saywell | 7,353 | 33.62 | +7.78 |
| Action démocratique | Michael Perzow | 2,457 | 11.24 | −18.41 |
| Green | Claude Sabourin | 760 | 3.48 | −1.19 |
| Québec solidaire | Loïc Kauffeisen | 456 | 2.09 | −0.16 |
| Total valid votes | | 21,869 | 100.00 | |
| Rejected and declined votes | | 346 | | |
| Turnout | | 22,215 | 54.17 | |
| Electors on the lists | | 41,006 | | |
Source: Official Results, Le Directeur général des élections du Québec.

2007 Quebec general election
| Party | Candidate | Votes | % | ±% |
|---|---|---|---|---|
| Liberal | David Whissell | 10,025 | 37.59 | −15.74 |
| Action démocratique | Georges Lapointe | 7,906 | 29.65 | +11.21 |
| Parti Québécois | John Saywell | 6,891 | 25.84 | +0.93 |
| Green | Claude Sabourin | 1,244 | 4.67 | +2.58 |
| Québec solidaire | Guy Dufresne | 600 | 2.25 | +1.02 |
| Total valid votes | | 26,666 | 100.00 | |
| Rejected and declined votes | | 248 | | |
| Turnout | | 26,914 | 68.52 | +2.06 |
| Electors on the lists | | 39,278 | | |
Source: Official Results, Le Directeur général des élections du Québec.

2003 Quebec general election
| Party | Candidate | Votes | % | ±% |
|---|---|---|---|---|
| Liberal | David Whissell | 12,645 | 53.33 | +10.86 |
| Parti Québécois | Georges Lapointe | 5,906 | 24.91 | −17.18 |
| Action démocratique | Sylvain Demers | 4,372 | 18.44 | +5.57 |
| Green | Claude Sabourin | 496 | 2.09 | - |
| Bloc Pot | Yannick Charpentier | 292 | 1.23 | +0.01 |
| Total valid votes | | 23,711 | 100.00 | |
| Rejected and declined votes | | 280 | | |
| Turnout | | 23,991 | 66.46 | |
| Electors on the lists | | 36,101 | | |
Source: Official Results, Le Directeur général des élections du Québec.

1998 Quebec general election
| Party | Candidate | Votes | % | ±% |
|---|---|---|---|---|
| Liberal | David Whissell | 16,684 | 42.47 | -14.71 |
| Parti Québécois | Denise Beaudoin | 16,536 | 42.09 | +4.52 |
| Action démocratique | Luc Boucher | 5,058 | 12.87 | +7.62 |
| Bloc Pot | Pierre Audette | 478 | 1.22 | – |
| Independent | Gilles Bisson | 271 | 0.69 | – |
| Natural Law | Marie-Thérèse Nault | 132 | 0.34 | – |
| Socialist Democracy | Michel Lecompte | 128 | 0.33 | – |
| Total valid votes | | 39,287 | 98.92 | – |
| Total rejected ballots | | 427 | 1.08 | – |
| Turnout | | 39,714 | 78.29 | +28.29 |
| Electors on the lists | | 50,725 | – | – |

Quebec provincial by-election, June 1, 1998
| Party | Candidate | Votes | % | ±% |
|---|---|---|---|---|
| Liberal | David Whissell | 13,589 | 57.18 | +14.59 |
| Parti Québécois | Denise Beaudoin | 8,928 | 37.57 | +0.01 |
| Action démocratique | François Vermette | 1,247 | 5.25 | -13.22 |
| Total valid votes | | 23,764 | 98.30 | – |
| Total rejected ballots | | 410 | 1.70 | – |
| Turnout | | 24,174 | 50.00 | -31.75 |
| Electors on the lists | | 48,340 | – | – |

1995 Quebec referendum
| Side | Votes | % |
|---|---|---|
| Non | 21,571 | 50.31 |
| Oui | 21,304 | 49.69 |

1994 Quebec general election
| Party | Candidate | Votes | % | ±% |
|---|---|---|---|---|
| Liberal | Régent Beaudet | 15,272 | 42.59 | −9.32 |
| Parti Québécois | André Riendeau | 13,470 | 37.56 | +4.30 |
| Action démocratique | Hubert Meilleur | 6,622 | 18.47 | – |
| Lemon | Serge Bérubé | 270 | 0.75 | – |
| Natural Law | Russell C. Guest | 224 | 0.62 | – |
| Total valid votes | | 35,858 | 98.54 | – |
| Total rejected ballots | | 530 | 1.46 | – |
| Turnout | | 36,388 | 81.75 | +8.29 |
| Electors on the lists | | 44,509 | – | – |
Source: Official Results, Le Directeur général des élections du Québec.

1992 Charlottetown Accord referendum
| Side | Votes | % |
|---|---|---|
| Non | 19,238 | 56.22 |
| Oui | 14,983 | 43.78 |

1989 Quebec general election
| Party | Candidate | Votes | % | ±% |
|---|---|---|---|---|
| Liberal | Claude Ryan | 14,187 | 51.91 | -13.74 |
| Parti Québécois | Alain Gérard | 9,089 | 33.26 | +3.74 |
| Equality | Peter Vernham | 4,052 | 14.83 | – |
| Total valid votes | | 27,328 | 97.27 | – |
| Total rejected ballots | | 766 | 2.73 | – |
| Turnout | | 28,094 | 73.46 | -0.89 |
| Electors on the lists | | 38,242 | – | – |

== See also ==
- List of Quebec provincial electoral districts
- Canadian provincial electoral districts
