= Barkmere =

- City
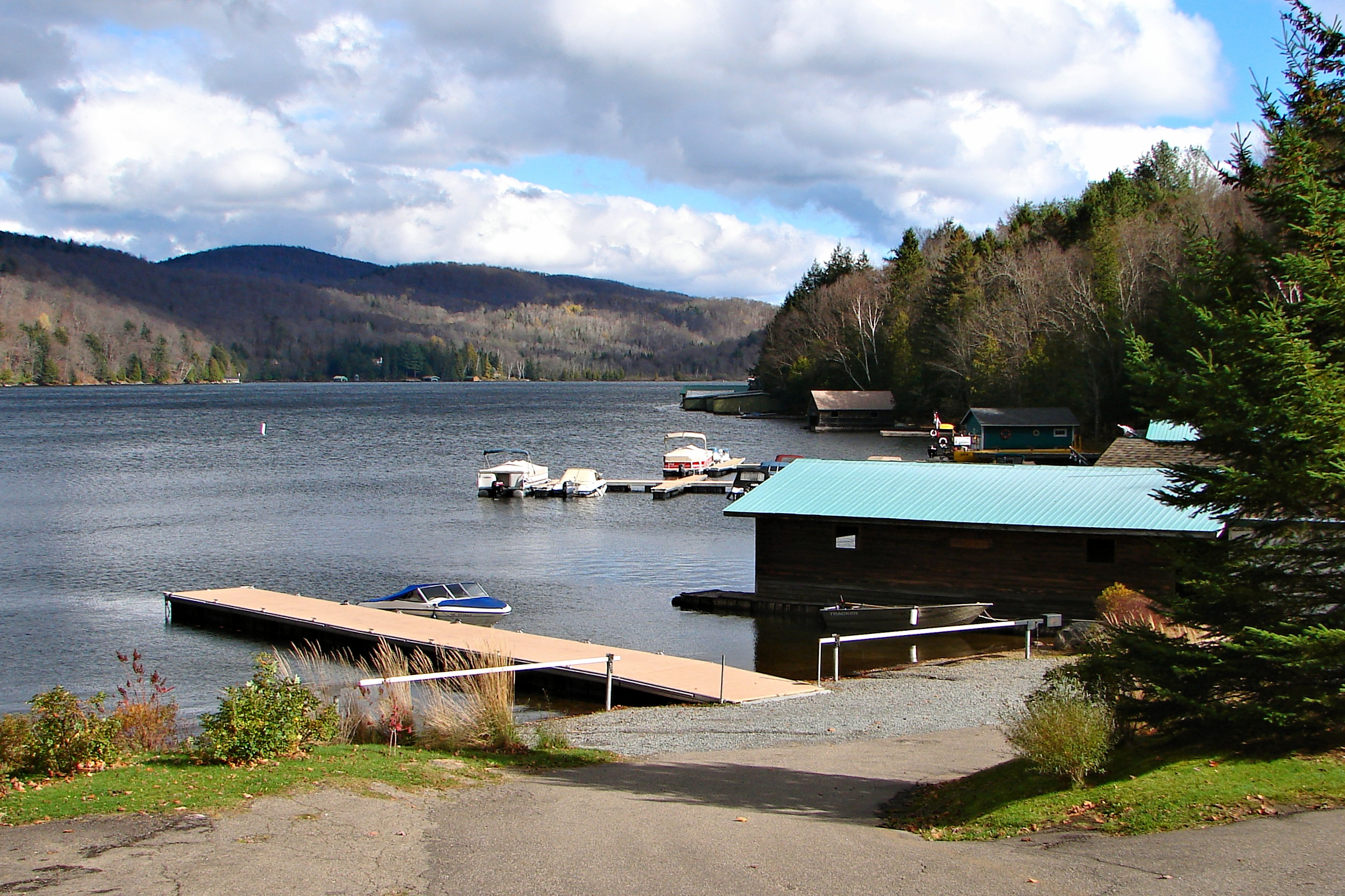

- Coat of arms

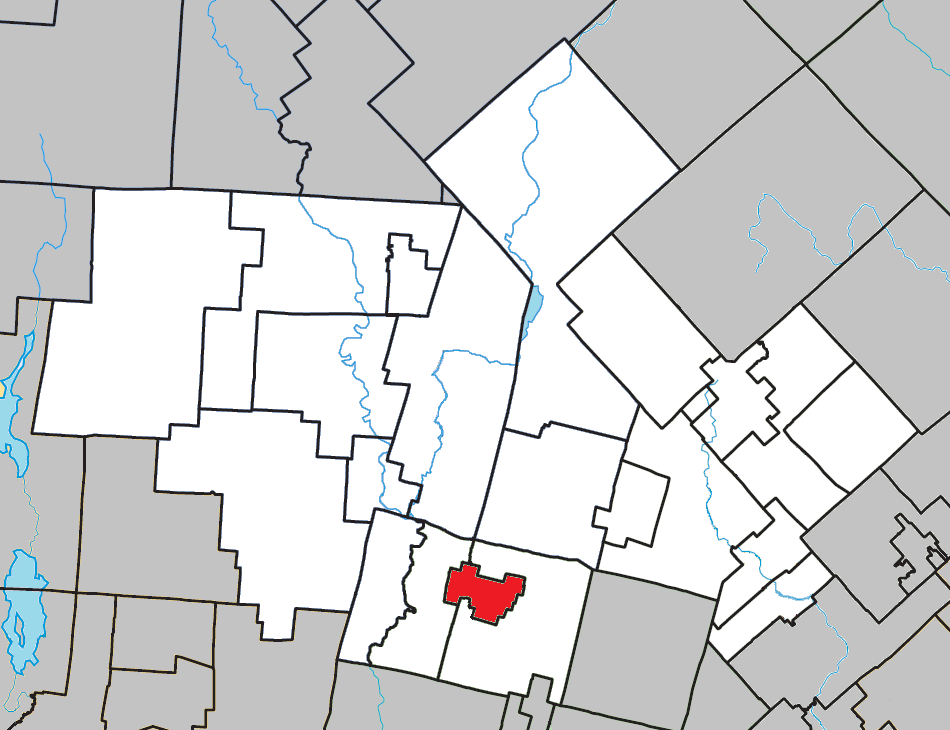
- Location within Les Laurentides RCM

- Location in central Quebec
- Coordinates: 46°00′N 74°35′W
- Country: Canada
- Province: Quebec
- Region: Laurentides
- RCM: Les Laurentides
- Settled: 1890s
- Constituted: March 24, 1926

Government
  - Mayor: Luc Trépanier
  - Fed. riding: Laurentides—Labelle
  - Prov. riding: Argenteuil

Area
  - Total: 24.91 km^{2} (9.62 sq mi)
  - Land: 17.72 km^{2} (6.84 sq mi)

Population (2021)
  - Total: 81
  - Density: 4.6/km^{2} (12/sq mi)
  - Change 2016-21: ▲39.7%
  - Dwellings: 230
- Time zone: UTC−5 (EST)
  - Summer (DST): UTC−4 (EDT)
- Postal code(s): J0T 1A0
- Area code: 819
- Highways: No major routes
- Website: barkmere.ca

Barkmere is a ville (city) in the Canadian province of Quebec, located in the Les Laurentides Regional County Municipality of the Laurentides administrative region. It surrounds and is named after Lac des Écorces, which was formerly known by its English equivalent Bark Lake. The village of Barkmere lies at the western end of the lake, on Miller Bay, roughly 120 km (75 mi) northwest of Montreal and about 20 minutes' drive from Mont-Tremblant.

With a population of just 81 in the 2021 Canadian census, Barkmere is one of the smallest incorporated municipalities in Quebec; its mayor has described it as the smallest city in the province apart from L'Île-Dorval, which has no permanent residents. The city is officially bilingual, and most of its residents are seasonal cottagers; although 230 private dwellings were counted in 2021, only 50 were occupied by usual residents.

== History ==
At the end of the 19th century, families from Montreal began spending their summers at Bark Lake, building cottages around its shores. The journey from Montreal was something of an expedition: travellers came by train, wagon, or on foot, and the Miller family sent a wagon to Arundel to collect visitors, who had often spent the night at the village's only hotel, before driving them to the lake, where they paddled to their cottages. Once a week, local farmers offered fresh produce at the landing. There were no roads around the lake, and most summer residents still reach their cottages by boat.

In 1896, a small earth-fill dam was built on the lake's outlet, Ruisseau Long, to retain the water of Lac des Écorces. In 1911, a summer post office bearing the name Barkmere opened at the lake.

In 1926, at the request of a number of cottagers, the place — which had previously been under the municipalities of Arundel and Weir and the townships of Montcalm and Arundel — was erected as a city in order to facilitate its administration. The Ville de Barkmere was constituted on March 24, 1926, under the Cities and Towns Act (Loi des cités et villes). The principal objective of its "founding fathers" was to protect Lac des Écorces and its environment from the threats of deforestation, harmful agricultural runoff, and overfishing. Over the years, the council adopted numerous regulations to protect the shorelines, to require the maintenance of septic systems, and to control residential development — an approach, unusual among Quebec municipalities, in which preservation has taken precedence over development.

Environmental protection remains the city's central priority. A lake-protection association monitors the water quality of Lac des Écorces, and in 2024 the city concluded a $120,340 financial agreement with SNAP Québec (the Société pour la nature et les parcs) and the group Éco-corridors laurentiens, under Quebec's "Plein aire – Présent pour les municipalités" initiative, to develop a proposal for a protected area covering just over 23 km^{2} (8.9 sq mi) of public lands northeast of the municipal territory, in order to preserve part of the lake's watershed. The proposed zone is adjacent to the Jack Rabbit Ecological Reserve and the Baie Silver old-growth forest, and the neighbouring municipality of Montcalm, in which more than half of the study zone lies, has given the project its formal support.

A new town hall and community centre was built in 2016.

== Toponymy ==
The name Barkmere derives from the English variant Bark Lake, formerly applied to the lake on whose shore the municipality lies and which now officially bears the name Lac des Écorces. In English, bark means "écorce" (tree bark), while mere is a poetic word for "lake". The name was first used in 1911 for the summer post office, and it was retained when the city was incorporated in 1926. The residents of Barkmere are known, in English, as "Bark Lakers".

== Geography ==
Barkmere is bounded by the municipality of Arundel to the west and south and by Montcalm to the north and east. Its territory, roughly 5 km (3.1 mi) north–south by 7.1 km (4.4 mi) east–west, is irregular in shape, with the territories of the neighbouring municipalities interlocking with its own. The area is mountainous and almost entirely forested. Mount Bald (268 m [879 ft]), in the western part of the territory, overlooks Miller Bay (altitude 229 m [751 ft]), its marina, and the village of Barkmere.

Lac des Écorces occupies nearly a quarter of the city's total area and is one of the most significant lakes in the Laurentians. At its full supply level, the impounded lake covers 648.6 ha (2.504 sq mi). Its principal bays are Miller and Elliot (to the west), Northwall (to the north), and Green, Wentworth, Cope, and Argentée (to the northeast). The lake contains several islands, including Île des Jésuites and Goulden Island, and more than 130 cottages line its shores, most of them accessible only by boat. The lake's outlet, Ruisseau Long, lies within the watershed of the Rivière Rouge, a tributary of the Ottawa River. A dam on the outlet, first built in 1896 and owned by the city, holds back the lake and is used for recreational and cottage purposes.

Within the municipality there are very few roads — most of the shoreline is accessible only by boat, and much of the territory is without electricity — giving the lake its secluded, unspoiled character.

== Demographics ==
In the 2021 Census of Population conducted by Statistics Canada, Barkmere had a population of 81 living in 50 of its 230 total private dwellings, a change of 39.7% from its 2016 population of 58. With a land area of 17.72 km^{2} (6.84 sq mi), it had a population density of 4.6/km^{2} (11.8/sq mi) in 2021.

The 2021 count was the highest since 2006, when 87 residents were enumerated; the population was 58 in both 2011 and 2016. Most of the town's dwellings are seasonal: only 50 of the 230 private dwellings counted in 2021 were occupied by usual residents, reflecting Barkmere's character as a summer cottage community. In 2010, a newspaper profile put the town's resident count at 88.

The median age in 2021 was 60.8 years, well above the national median of 41.6 years. Although the city is officially bilingual, a notable German community also lives in the area.

Canada census – Barkmere community profile

	2021	2016	2011
Population	81 (+39.7% from 2016)	58 (0.0% from 2011)	58 (-33.3% from 2006)
Land area	17.72 km^{2} (6.84 sq mi)	17.99 km^{2} (6.95 sq mi)	18.93 km^{2} (7.31 sq mi)
Population density	4.6/km^{2} (12/sq mi)	3.2/km^{2} (8.3/sq mi)	3.1/km^{2} (8.0/sq mi)
Median age	60.8 (M: 60.8, F: 58.8)	59.5 (M: 57.5, F: 63.1)	60.0 (M: 55.8, F: 62.8)
Private dwellings	230 (total) 50 (occupied)	367 (total)	217 (total)
Median household income	$ n/a	$52,608	$.N/A

Notes: Income data for this area has been suppressed for data quality or confidentiality reasons.
References: 2021 2016 2011

Historical census populations – Barkmere

Year	Pop.	±%
1931	36	—
1941	40	+11.1%
1951	64	+60.0%
1956	64	+0.0%
1961	56	−12.5%
1966	50	−10.7%

Year	Pop.	±%
1971	52	+4.0%
1976	45	−13.5%
1981	51	+13.3%
1986	60	+17.6%
1991	62	+3.3%
1996	53	−14.5%

Year	Pop.	±%
2001	44	−17.0%
2006	87	+97.7%
2011	58	−33.3%
2016	58	+0.0%
2021	81	+39.7%

Source: Statistics Canada

Mother tongue (2021):

- English as first language: 25.0%
- French as first language: 68.8%
- English and French as first languages: 6.3%
- Other as first language: 0%

== Government ==
Barkmere is a city governed under Quebec's Cities and Towns Act. Its town hall is located at 199 Chemin de Barkmere. The mayor is Luc Trépanier, and the director general is Martin-Paul Gélinas. Federally, the city is in the riding of Laurentides—Labelle; provincially, it is in the riding of Argenteuil. Since its incorporation in 1926, the protection of the city's natural environment has been the municipal council's foremost priority.

== Recreation and tourism ==
The Marina de Barkmere, in Miller Bay at the foot of Mount Bald, serves boaters on the lake. Swimming, boating, canoeing, and fishing are popular summer activities, and the lake is known for the clarity of its water. The Bark Lake Protective Association (Association pour la protection du lac des Écorces) works to maintain the natural beauty of the lake and organizes community events, including an annual regatta, a sailing regatta, a corn roast, and outdoor movie nights.

The Camp des Débrouillards, a science-themed summer camp affiliated with the magazines Les Débrouillards and Les Explorateurs, operates at 76 Chemin de Barkmere in the village, offering stays for children aged 5 to 17.

The chapel of the summer residence built by the Jesuits in Barkmere dates from 1928; the neoclassical building, which overlooks Lac des Écorces, is inventoried in the Répertoire du patrimoine culturel du Québec.

For cyclists and hikers, the Corridor aérobique, a 58 km (36 mi) multi-purpose trail linking Morin-Heights to Amherst, passes through the surrounding municipalities; it follows the right-of-way of a Canadian National Railway line abandoned in 1962. The resort town of Mont-Tremblant lies about 20 minutes away by car, and canoes can be rented for trips on the Rivière Rouge.

== Gallery ==
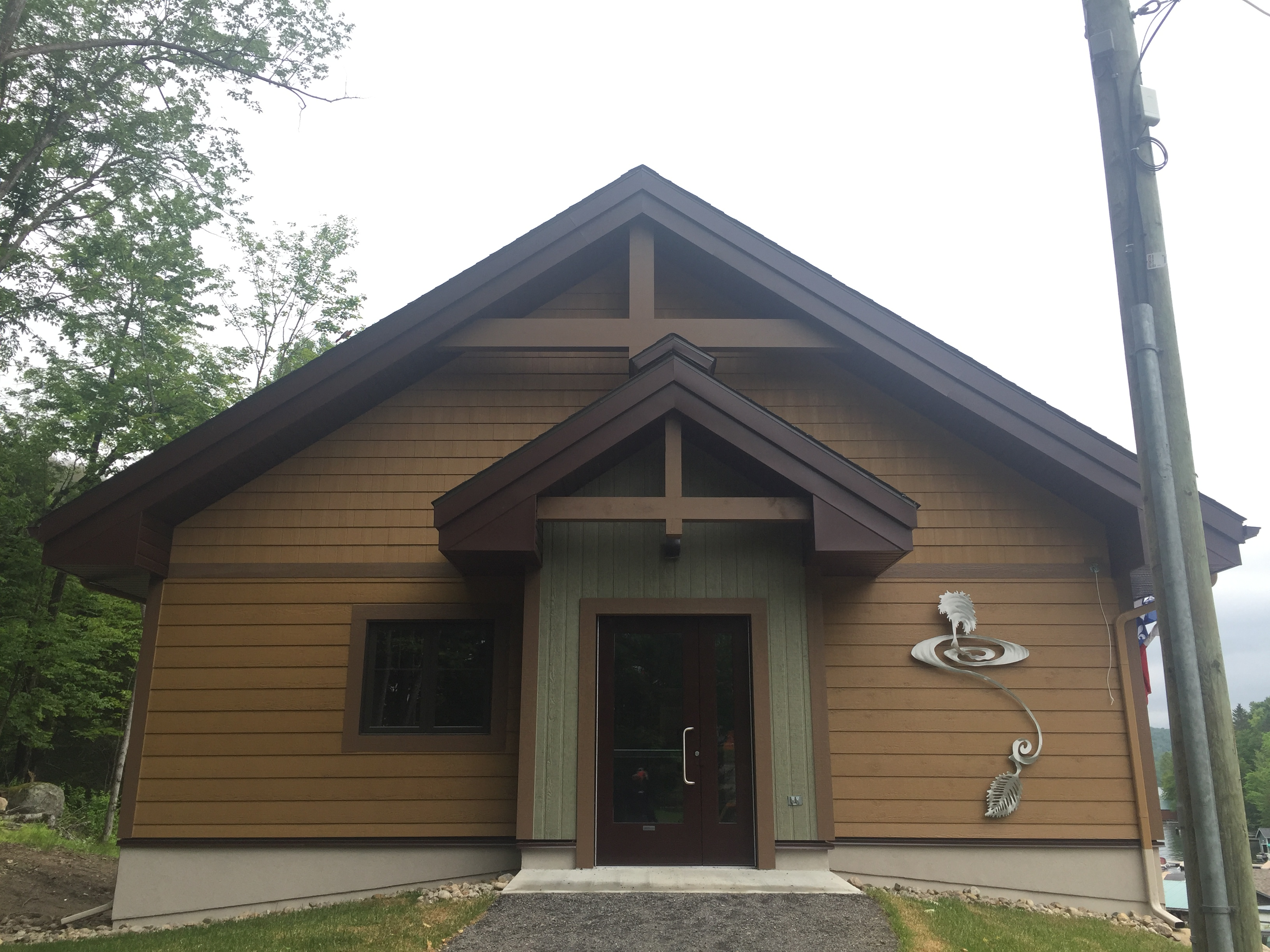
New town hall and community center built in 2016.

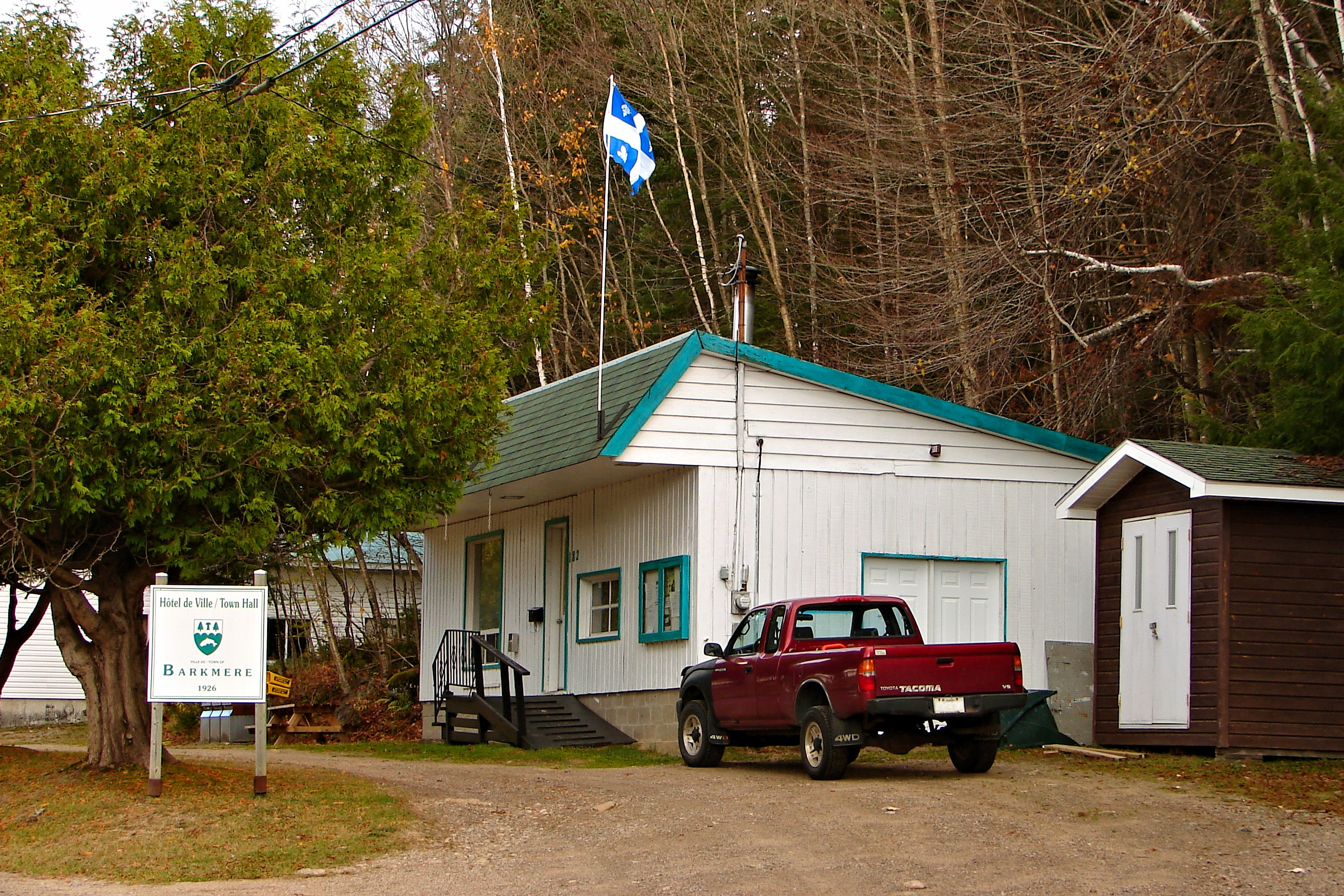
Municipal office

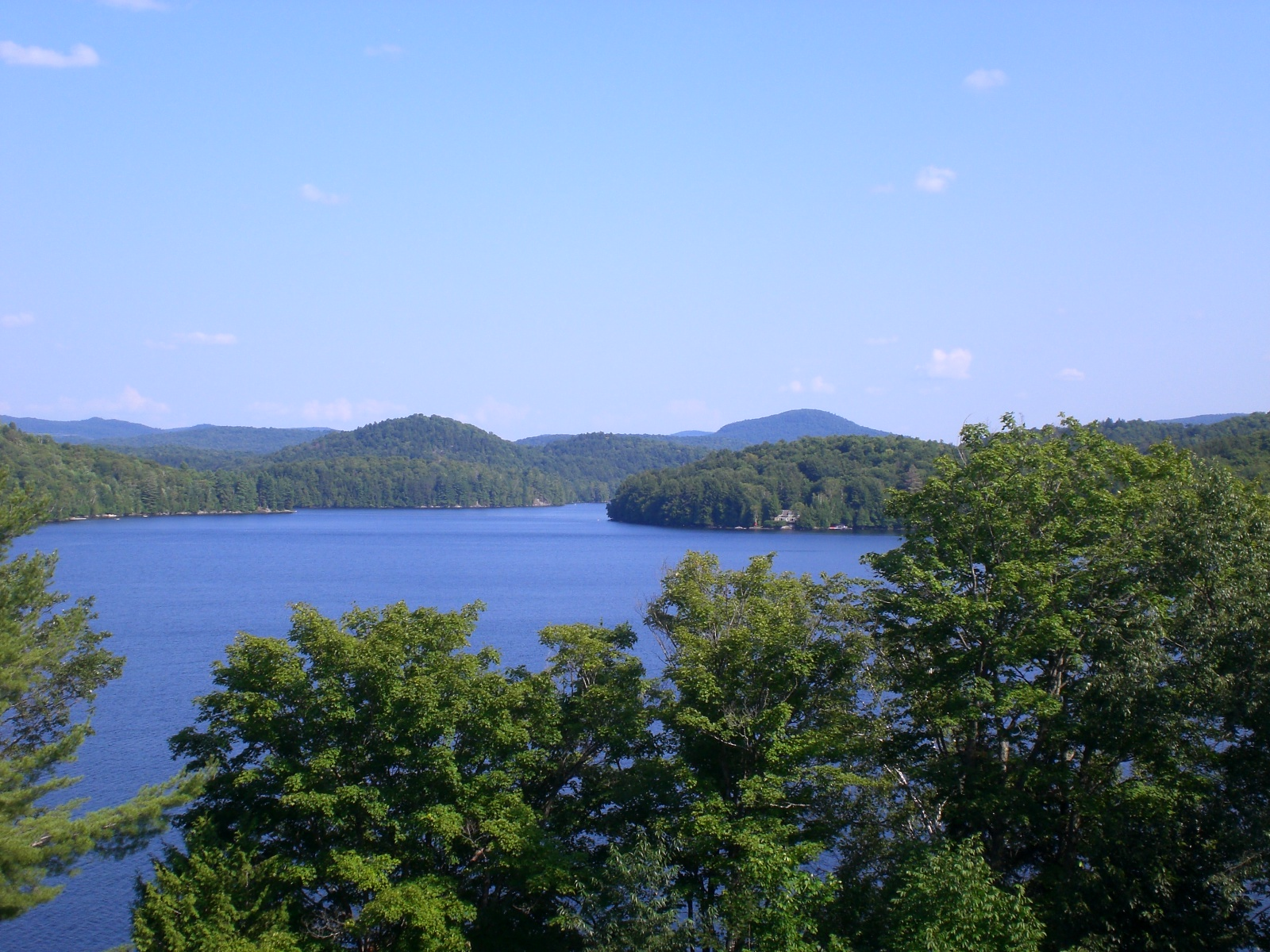
View of the lake

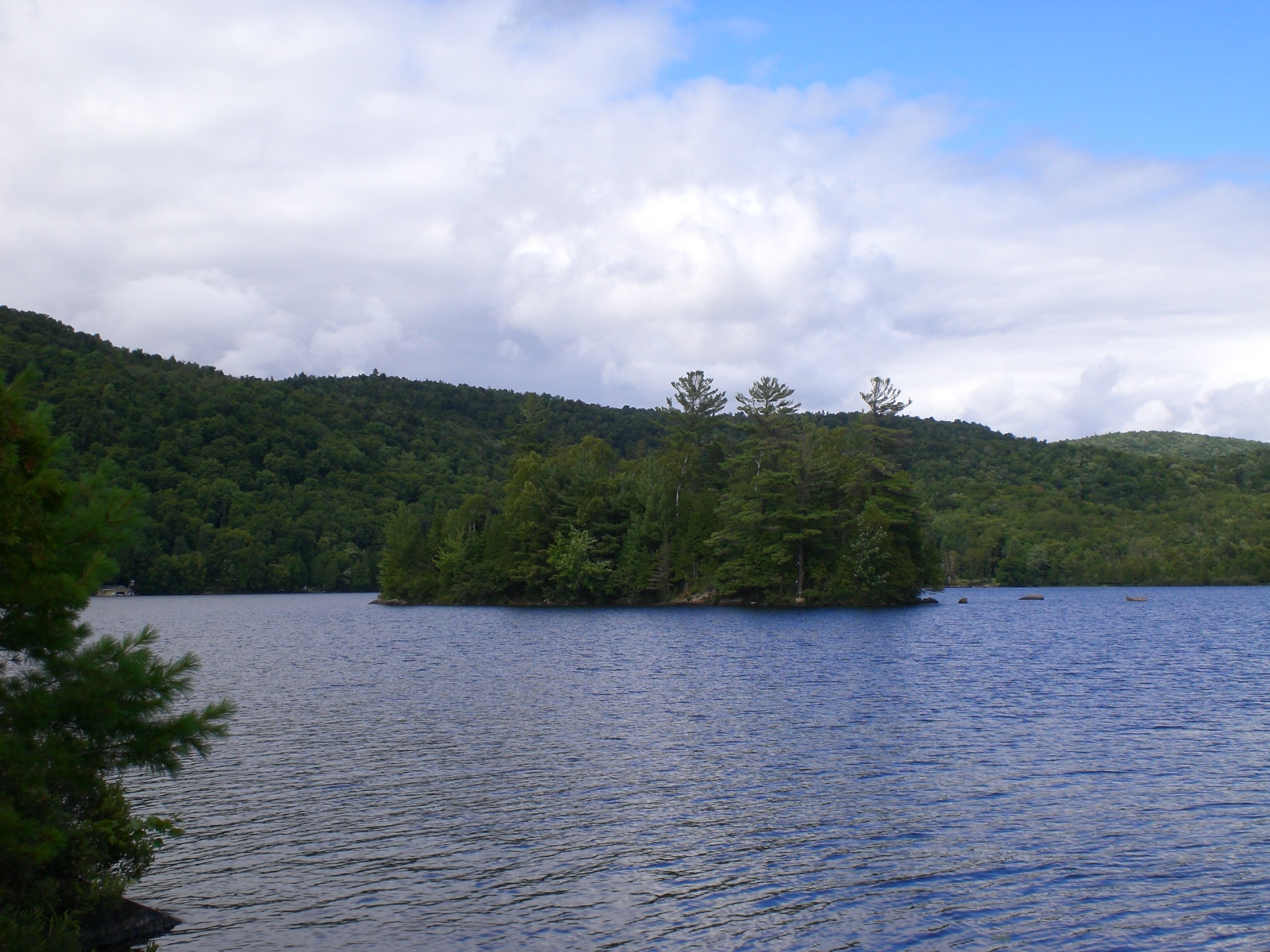
Jesuit island

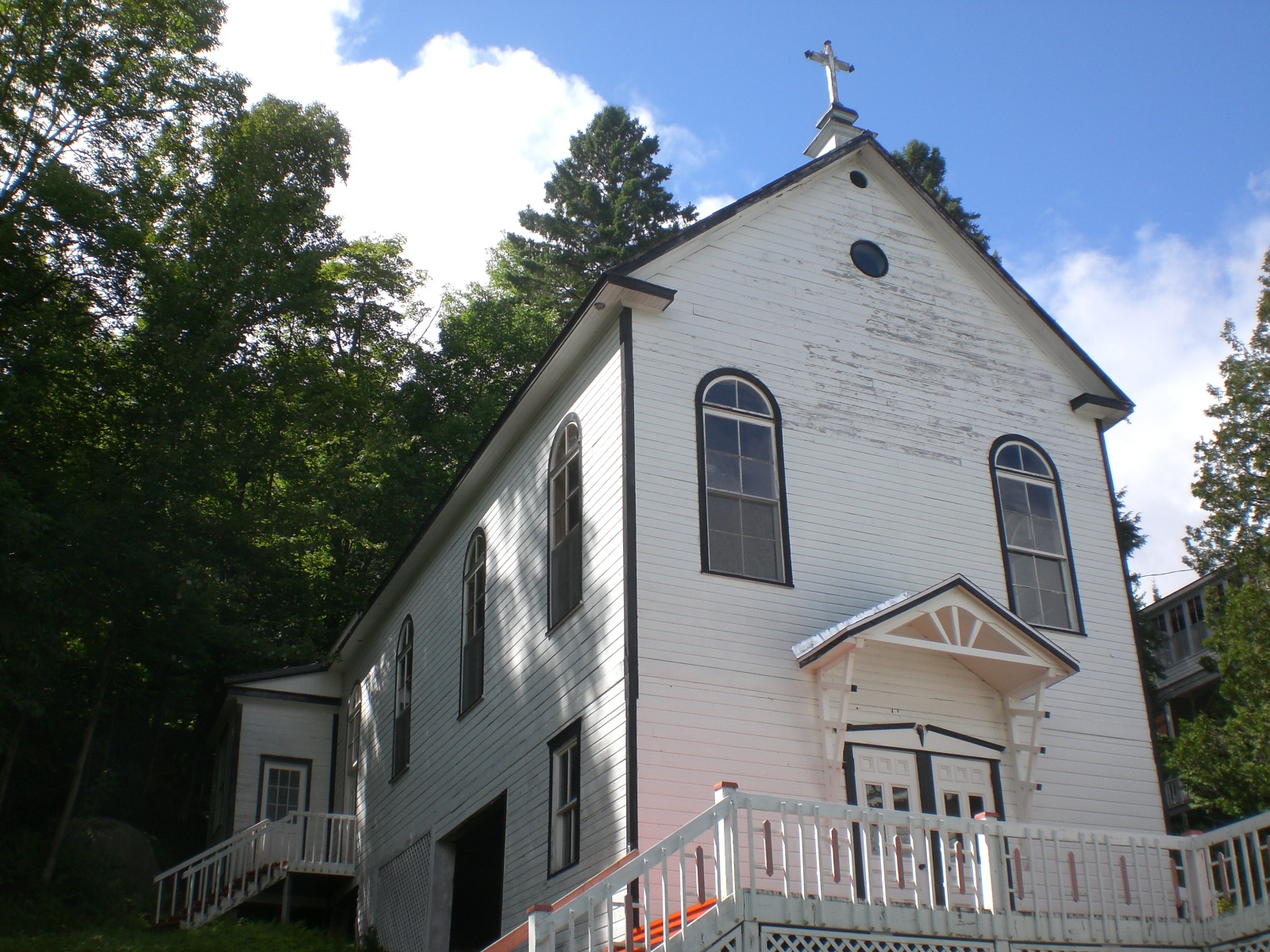
Jesuit chapel (1928)

== Education ==
There are no schools within the municipality itself; students are bused to schools in neighbouring communities. The Sir Wilfrid Laurier School Board operates English-language schools:

- Arundel Elementary School in Arundel
- Sainte Agathe Academy (for high school only) in Sainte-Agathe-des-Monts

== See also ==
- List of anglophone communities in Quebec
- List of cities in Quebec
