= Joseph-Léon Saint-Jacques =

Canadian politician

Member of the Legislative Assembly of Quebec for Argenteuil
- In office 1925–1927
- Preceded by: John Hay
- Succeeded by: Georges Dansereau

Personal details
- Born: July 13, 1877 Saint-Hermas (Mirabel), Quebec
- Died: September 24, 1964 (aged 87) Montreal, Quebec
- Resting place: Notre Dame des Neiges Cemetery
- Party: Conservative

Joseph-Léon Saint-Jacques (July 13, 1877 – September 24, 1964) was a Canadian provincial politician. He was the Conservative member of the Legislative Assembly of Quebec for Argenteuil from 1925 to 1927.
