= Harry Slater (politician) =

Canadian politician

Member of the Legislative Assembly of Quebec for Argenteuil
- In office 1912–1916
- Preceded by: John Hay
- Succeeded by: John Hay

Personal details
- Born: May 24, 1863 Portsmouth, England
- Died: January 11, 1936 (aged 72) Lachute, Quebec
- Party: Conservative

Harry Slater (May 24, 1863 – January 11, 1936) was a Canadian politician.

Born in Portsmouth, England, Slater emigrated to Quebec in 1890 where he worked as a bookkeeper for the Montreal company Moffat Blocking before becoming president of Lachute Knitting. He was mayor of Lachute from 1903 to 1905. He ran unsuccessfully for the Legislative Assembly of Quebec for the riding of Argenteuil in a 1910 by-election. A Conservative, he was elected in 1912 and defeated in 1916. He ran unsuccessfully for the House of Commons of Canada in 1917 losing to Peter Robert McGibbon.

He died in Lachute in 1936.
