= Brownsburg, West Virginia =

Unincorporated community in West Virginia, United States

- Unincorporated community
- Location within West Virginia Location within the United States
- Coordinates: 38°16′04″N 80°04′31″W
- Country: United States
- State: West Virginia
- County: Pocahontas
- Elevation: 2,612 ft (796 m)
- Time zone: UTC-5 (Eastern (EST))
  - Summer (DST): UTC-4 (EDT)
- Area codes: 304 & 681
- GNIS feature ID: 1558349

Brownsburg is an unincorporated community in Pocahontas County, West Virginia, United States. Brownsburg is 3 miles (4.8 km) north-northeast of Marlinton.
