= Robert Greenshields Meikle =

Canadian politician

Member of the Legislative Assembly of Quebec for Argenteuil
- In office 1878–1881
- Preceded by: Sydney Robert Bellingham
- Succeeded by: William Owens

Personal details
- Born: 1832
- Died: April 9, 1901 (aged 68–69)
- Party: Liberal

Robert Greenshields Meikle (1832 – April 9, 1901) was a merchant and political figure in Quebec. He represented Argenteuil in the Legislative Assembly of Quebec from 1878 to 1881 as a Liberal.

He was born in Lachute, Lower Canada, the son of John Meikle, originally a manufacturer in Glasgow, and Jean Greenshields. In 1830, he became co-owner of the general store established by his father at Lachute. Meikle was a justice of the peace and also served in the Commissioners' Court. He ran unsuccessfully for a seat in the House of Commons in 1887.
