= Brownsburg, Quebec =

District in Canada

Coordinates: 45°40′10″N 74°26′33″W

The village municipality of Brownsburg (French pronunciation: [bɹaunsbɚɡ]) is a former municipality now part of the current city of Brownsburg-Chatham, Quebec, Canada.

Prior to October 6, 1999, Brownsburg was an independent municipality; on that date, it and the township of Chatham were merged into the new municipality of Brownsburg-Chatham.

== History ==
The sector was originally part of Chatham. In 1935, the sector became an independent municipality. In 1999, Brownsburg was merged with Chatham to create the current city of Brownsburg-Chatham.

== Demographics ==
Historical census populations – Brownsburg (Village) 1935–1999

| Year | Pop. | ±% |
|---|---|---|
| 1941 | 3,105 | — |
| 1951 | 3,238 | +4.3% |
| 1956 | 3,412 | +5.4% |
| 1961 | 3,617 | +6.0% |

| Year | Pop. | ±% |
|---|---|---|
| 1966 | 3,596 | −0.6% |
| 1971 | 3,481 | −3.2% |
| 1976 | 3,114 | −10.5% |
| 1981 | 2,875 | −7.7% |

| Year | Pop. | ±% |
|---|---|---|
| 1986 | 2,679 | −6.8% |
| 1991 | 2,480 | −7.4% |
| 1996 | 2,583 | +4.2% |

Population counts are not adjusted for boundary changes.
Source: Statistics Canada
