= Zoël Saindon =

Canadian politician

Member of the National Assembly of Quebec for Argenteuil
- In office 1966–1978
- Preceded by: William McOuat Cottingham
- Succeeded by: Claude Ryan

Personal details
- Born: October 18, 1919 Edmundston, New Brunswick
- Died: October 29, 1998 (aged 79) Lachute, Quebec
- Party: Liberal

Zoël Saindon (October 18, 1919 – October 29, 1998) was a Canadian provincial politician. He was the Liberal member of the National Assembly of Quebec for Argenteuil from 1966 to 1978. He was also mayor of Lachute from 1964 to 1975.
