= David Whissell =

Canadian politician

MNA for Argenteuil
- In office 30 November 1998 – 16 December 2011
- Preceded by: Regent Beaudet
- Succeeded by: Agnès Grondin

Personal details
- Born: 1 September 1967 (age 59) Montreal, Quebec, Canada
- Party: Quebec Liberal Party
- Education: École polytechnique de Montréal
- Profession: Civil engineer, businessman

David Whissell (born 1 September 1967) is a Canadian politician, businessman, engineer and former Quebec cabinet minister.

Born in Montreal, Whissell received a bachelor's degree in civil engineering from the École polytechnique de Montréal in 1990. He worked as an engineer at Whissell Inc., in Lachute, and became the president and owner of Beton 344 Inc. in Saint-André-d'Argenteuil near Lachute, and the president and vice-president of the Chamber of Commerce of Lachute.

Prior to his entry into provincial politics, he was the president of the Liberal Party of Canada association in the Argenteuil region. He was later the member for Argenteuil in the National Assembly of Quebec as a member of the Quebec Liberal Party. He was first elected in a by-election on 1 June 1998, and was re-elected in the general elections held on November 30, 1998 and April 14, 2003. When the Liberals regained power he was named the Parliamentary secretary to Jean Charest. In 2005, after a Cabinet shuffle, he would become the Chair of the Government Caucus and member responsible for the Laurentians.

Whissell was the only Liberal member to be re-elected in the Laurentides region in the 2007 elections. He was named Minister of Labour and the Minister responsible for the Abitibi-Témiscamingue, Laurentides and Lanaudière regions.

He resigned from the Cabinet on 9 September 2009, following a conflict of interest related to a company in which he owned shares. According to a local newspaper, the company, ABC Rive-Nord, specialized in asphalt making and received multiple contracts without call for bids from the Ministry of Transportation.

He resigned his seat in the National Assembly on 16 December 2011, citing family reasons and a desire to focus on his business career.

He lives with Francine Vaillancourt and is the father of two children, Justine and Philippe.

== Electoral record ==
2008 Quebec general election: Argenteuil
Party	Candidate	Votes	%	±%
Liberal	David Whissell	10,843	49.58	+11.99
Parti Québécois	John Saywell	7,353	33.62	+7.78
Action démocratique	Michael Perzow	2,457	11.24	−18.41
Green	Claude Sabourin	760	3.48	−1.19
Québec solidaire	Loïc Kauffeisen	456	2.09	−0.16
Total valid votes		21,869	100.00	
Rejected and declined votes		346		
Turnout		22,215	54.17	
Electors on the lists		41,006		
Source: Official Results, Le Directeur général des élections du Québec.

2007 Quebec general election: Argenteuil
Party	Candidate	Votes	%	±%
Liberal	David Whissell	10,025	37.59	−15.74
Action démocratique	Georges Lapointe	7,906	29.65	+11.21
Parti Québécois	John Saywell	6,891	25.84	+0.93
Green	Claude Sabourin	1,244	4.67	+2.58
Québec solidaire	Guy Dufresne	600	2.25	+1.02
Total valid votes		26,666	100.00	
Rejected and declined votes		248		
Turnout		26,914	68.52	+2.06
Electors on the lists		39,278		
Source: Official Results, Le Directeur général des élections du Québec.

2003 Quebec general election: Argenteuil
Party	Candidate	Votes	%	±%
Liberal	David Whissell	12,645	53.33	+10.86
Parti Québécois	Georges Lapointe	5,906	24.91	−17.18
Action démocratique	Sylvain Demers	4,372	18.44	+5.57
Green	Claude Sabourin	496	2.09	-
Bloc Pot	Yannick Charpentier	292	1.23	+0.01
Total valid votes		23,711	100.00	
Rejected and declined votes		280		
Turnout		23,991	66.46	
Electors on the lists		36,101		
Source: Official Results, Le Directeur général des élections du Québec.

Political offices
Preceded by Laurent Lessard	Minister of Labour; 2007–2009	Succeeded by Lise Thériault
