= Georges Dansereau =

Canadian politician (1867–1934)

Member of the Legislative Assembly of Quebec for Argenteuil
- In office 1927–1934
- Preceded by: Joseph-Léon Saint-Jacques
- Succeeded by: Georges-Étienne Dansereau ⋅

Personal details
- Born: December 15, 1867 Verchères, Quebec
- Died: December 26, 1934 (aged 67) Grenville, Quebec
- Party: Liberal

Georges Dansereau (December 15, 1867 – December 26, 1934) was a Canadian provincial politician. He was the Liberal member of the Legislative Assembly of Quebec for Argenteuil from 1927 until his death in 1934. He was also mayor of Grenville, Quebec, serving terms in 1910–1912, 1914, 1915, and 1933–1934. He was the father of Georges-Étienne Dansereau.
