= Brownsburg-Chatham =

- City
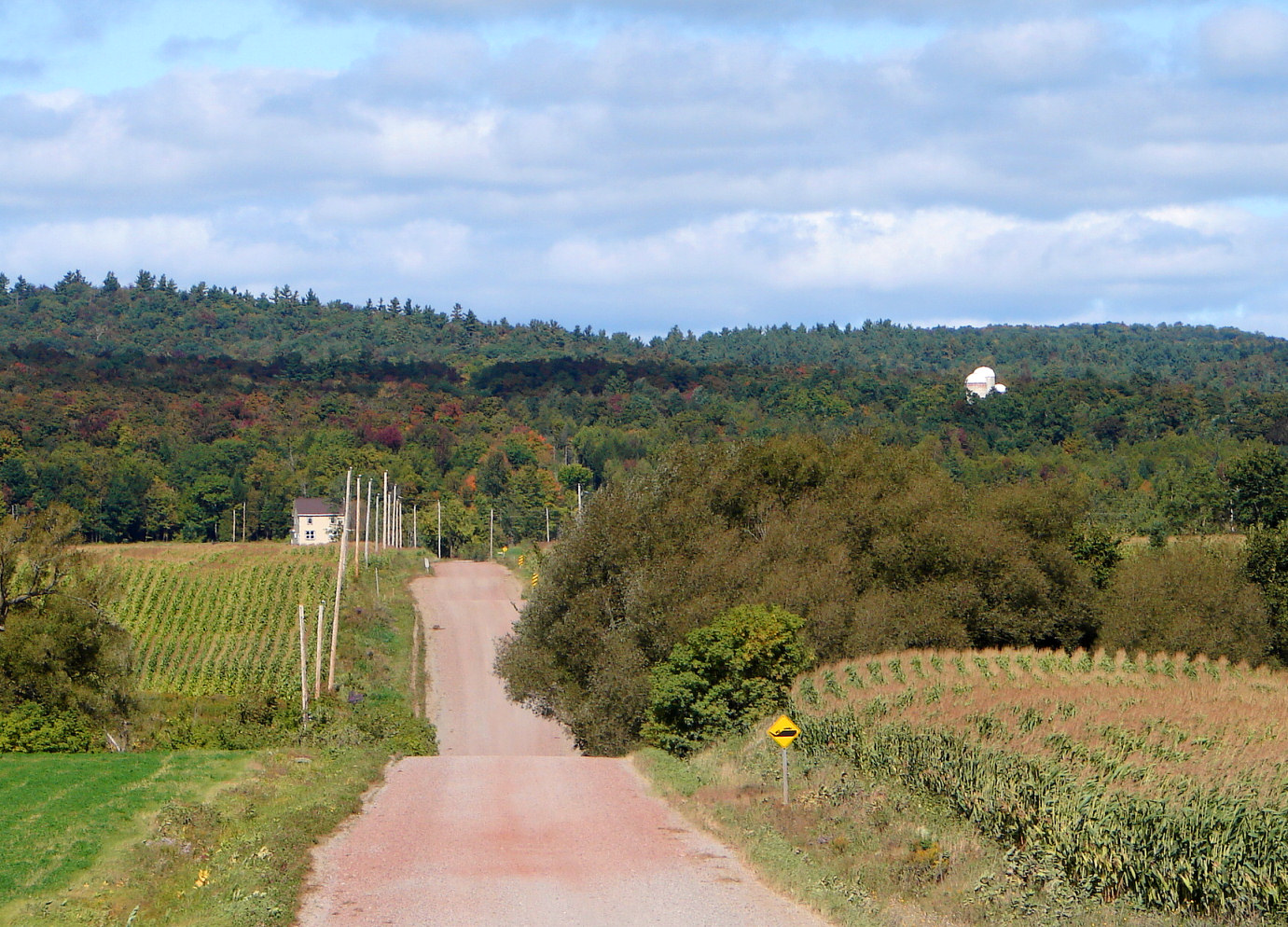
- Countryside of Brownsburg-Chatham

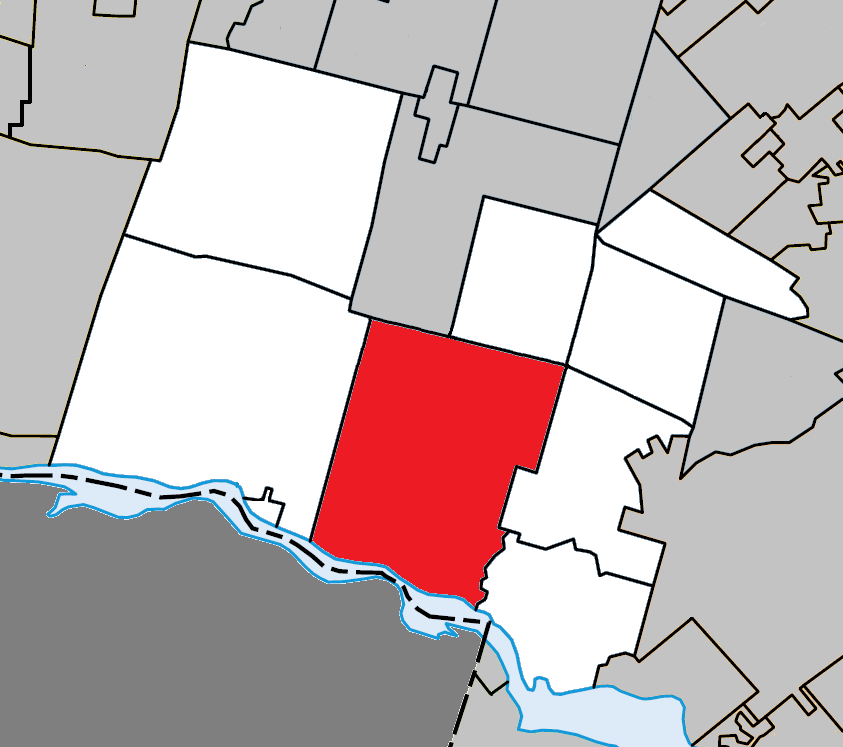
- Location within Argenteuil RCM

- Location in central Quebec
- Coordinates: 45°41′N 74°25′W
- Country: Canada
- Province: Quebec
- Region: Laurentides
- RCM: Argenteuil
- Settled: Early 1800s
- Constituted: October 6, 1999

Government
  - Mayor: Kévin Maurice
  - Federal riding: Argenteuil—La Petite-Nation
  - Prov. riding: Argenteuil

Area
  - City: 254.68 km^{2} (98.33 sq mi)
  - Land: 244.46 km^{2} (94.39 sq mi)
  - Urban: 1.00 km^{2} (0.39 sq mi)

Population (2021)
  - City: 7,247
  - Density: 29.6/km^{2} (77/sq mi)
  - Urban: 1,315
  - Urban density: 1,308.7/km^{2} (3,390/sq mi)
  - Pop 2016-2021: ▲1.8%
  - Dwellings: 3,783
- Time zone: UTC−5 (EST)
  - Summer (DST): UTC−4 (EDT)
- Postal code(s): J8G
- Area codes: 450 and 579
- Highways A-50: R-148; R-327; R-344
- Website: www.brownsburgchatham.ca

Brownsburg-Chatham (French pronunciation: [bɹaunsbɚɡ ʃatam]) is a municipality in the Laurentides region of Quebec, Canada, part of the Argenteuil Regional County Municipality.

Economic activities include agriculture, tourism and the manufacture of explosives. It is the hometown of late Montreal Canadiens defenceman Gilles Lupien.

== History ==
Chatham Township was established in 1799, and named after English Statesman William Pitt, 1st Earl of Chatham (1708–1778). Mostly populated by rich American Loyalists, its post office opened in 1829 and the township municipality was formed in 1845. By the mid-19th century, there were a few hamlets including Dalesville, Brownsbury, and Starneville.

In 1818, Major George Brown, born in England, was granted by the government land on the West River (Rivière de l'Ouest). Together with pioneers Daniel Smith and Captain A. L. Howard, he was able to breathe life into the local industry during the 1820s. George Brown built, among other achievements, a sawmill and gristmill which contributed to the economic growth of the region and led to the formation of Brownsburg village which was named after him. In 1854, the Brownsburg Post Office opened. Later in the third quarter of the 19th century, a major arms factory run by the Dominion Cartridge Company was the major local industry.

In 1935, the Village Municipality of Brownsburg was officially established by separating from the Township Municipality of Chatham.

On October 6, 1999, Brownsburg was rejoined with Chatham and the new Municipality of Brownsburg-Chatham was formed. On July 6, 2002, the municipality changed its statutes and became the Town of Brownsburg-Chatham.

== Geography ==
Brownsburg-Chatham is located along the Ottawa River, just west of Lachute, and includes the communities of Brownsburg, Cushing, Dalesville, Greece's Point, Pine Hill, and Saint-Philippe.

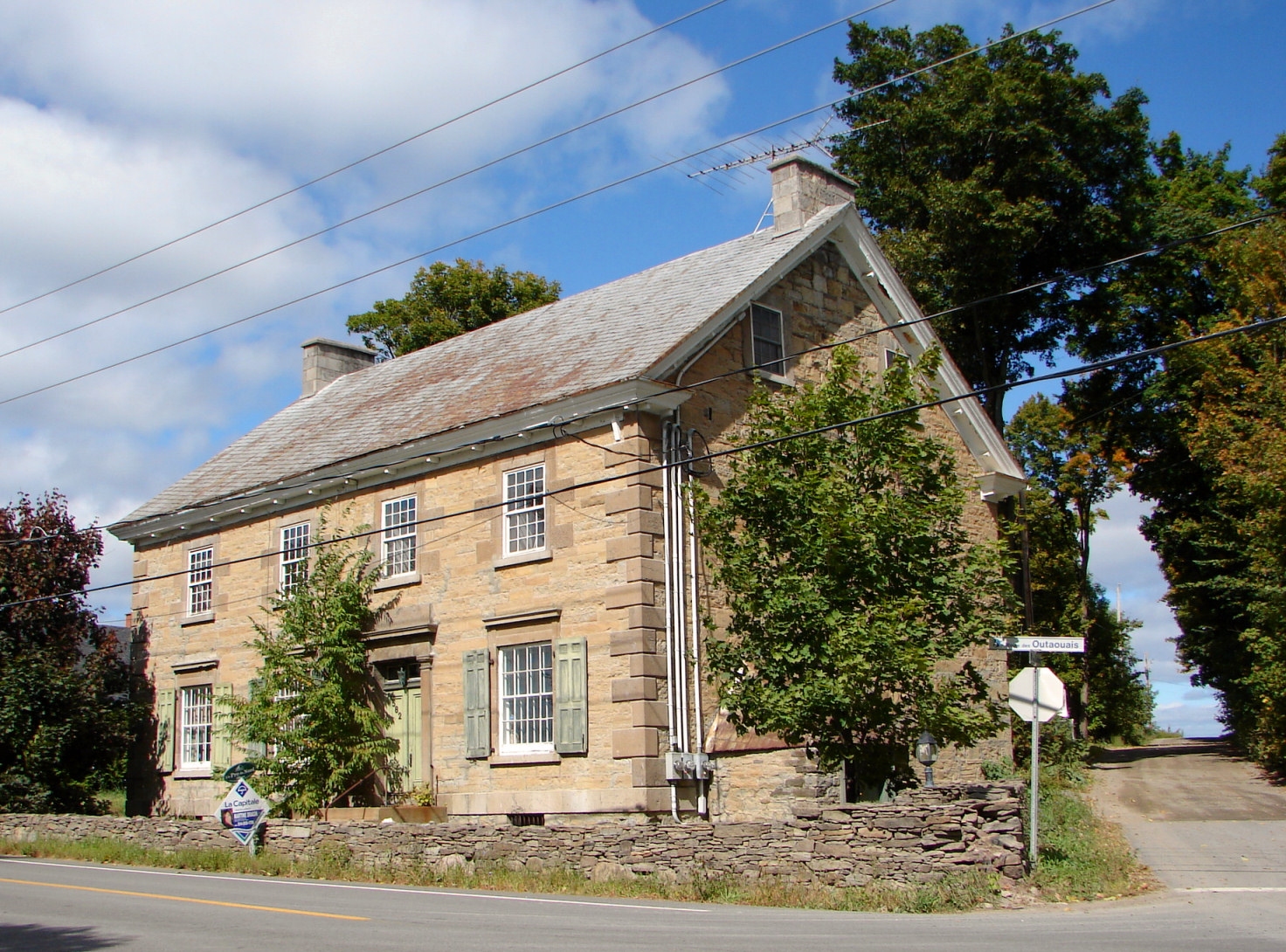
Cushing

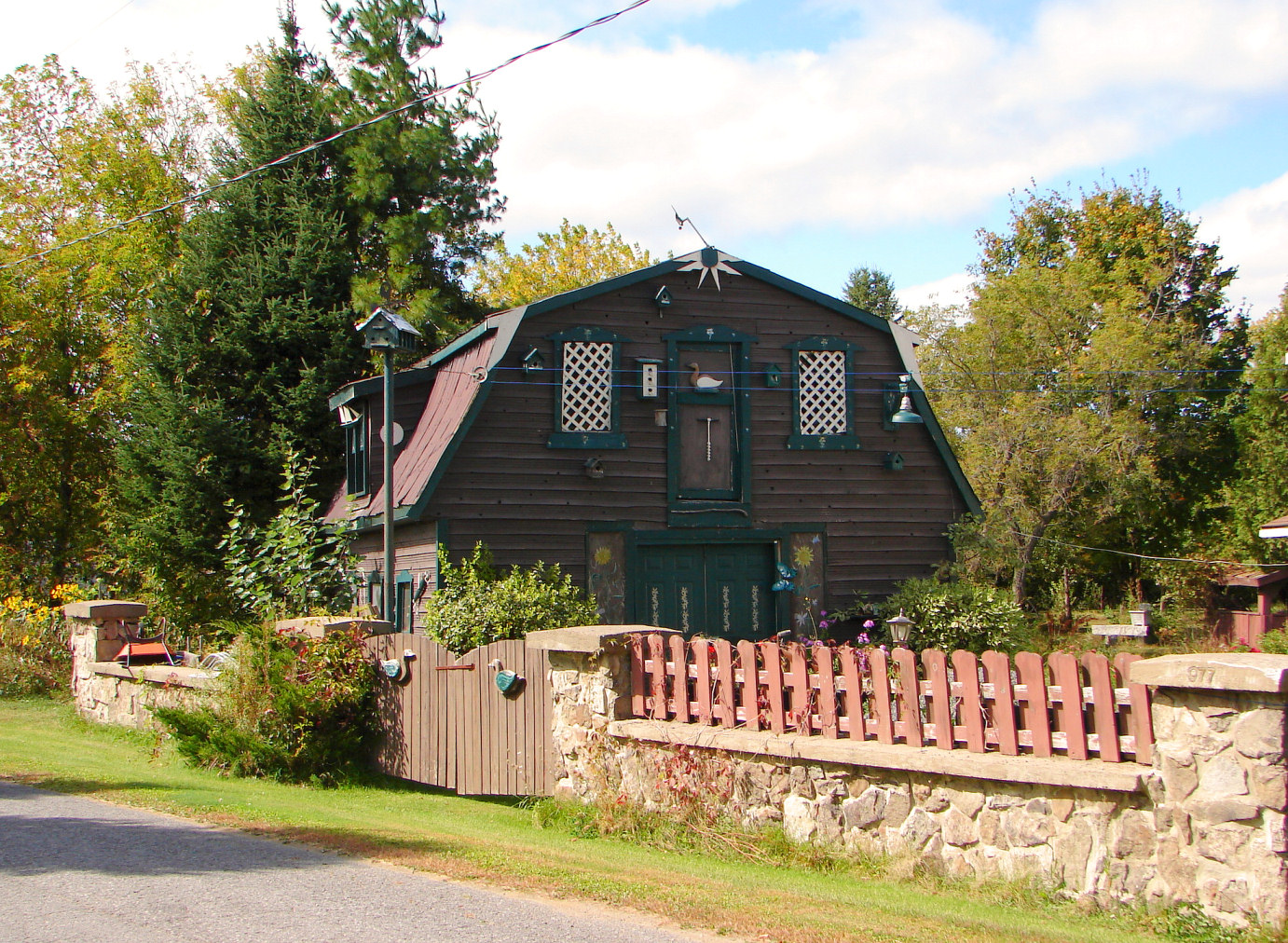
Greece's Point

== Demographics ==
In the 2021 Census of Population conducted by Statistics Canada, Brownsburg-Chatham had a population of 7,247 living in 3,282 of its 3,783 total private dwellings, a change of 1.8% from its 2016 population of 7,122. With a land area of 244.46 km^{2} (94.39 sq mi), it had a population density of 29.6/km^{2} (76.8/sq mi) in 2021.

Canada census – Brownsburg-Chatham community profile

	2021	2016	2011
Population	7,247 (+1.8% from 2016)	7,122 (-1.2% from 2011)	7209 (+8.2% from 2006)
Land area	244.46 km^{2} (94.39 sq mi)	247.40 km^{2} (95.52 sq mi)	248.38 km^{2} (95.90 sq mi)
Population density	29.6/km^{2} (77/sq mi)	28.8/km^{2} (75/sq mi)	29.0/km^{2} (75/sq mi)
Median age	48.4 (M: 48.4, F: 48.8)	46.7 (M: 46.6, F: 46.9)	44.1 (M: 44.3, F: 43.9)
Private dwellings	3,783 (total) 3,282 (occupied)	3,726 (total)	3,651 (total)
Median household income	$66,000	$54,955	$44,790

References: 2021 2016 2011

Historical Census Data - Brownsburg-Chatham, Quebec
Year	Pop.	±%
2001	6,770	—
2006	6,664	−1.6%
2011	7,209	+8.2%
2016	7,122	−1.2%
2021	7,247	+1.8%
Source: Statistics Canada

Canada Census Mother Tongue - Brownsburg-Chatham, Quebec
Census	Total	French			English			French & English			Other		
Year	Responses	Count	Trend	Pop %	Count	Trend	Pop %	Count	Trend	Pop %	Count	Trend	Pop %
2021	7,240	5,870	▲2.4%	81.1%	1,035	▲0.5%	14.3%	145	▲107.1%	2.0%	170	▲3.0%	2.3%
2016	6,995	5,730	▼0.1%	81.9%	1,030	▼10.0%	14.7%	70	▼33.3%	1.0%	165	▲13.8%	2.4%
2011	7,130	5,735	▲7.9%	80.4%	1,145	▲7.9%	16.1%	105	▲47.6%	1.5%	145	▼40.0%	2.0%
2006	6,620	5,280	▼0.8%	79.8%	1,055	▼4.5%	15.9%	55	▼59.3%	0.8%	230	▲58.7%	3.5%
2001	6,655	5,320	▲1.7%	79.9%	1,105	▼6.8%	16.6%	135	▲29.6%	2.0%	95	0.0%	1.4%
1996	6,605	5,230	n/a	79.2%	1,185	n/a	17.9%	95	n/a	1.4%	95	n/a	1.4%

== Government ==
The city council meetings are available online since February 2, 2016.

List of former mayors:

- Lise Bourgault (2003–2009)
- Georges Dinel (2009–2013)
- Serge Riendeau (2013–2017)
- Catherine Trickey (2017–2021)
- Kévin Maurice (2021–present)

== Education ==
The Centre de services scolaire de la Rivière-du-Nord operates French-language public schools.

- École primaire Bouchard
- École primaire St-Philippe
- École polyvalente Lavigne in Lachute

The Sir Wilfrid Laurier School Board operates English-language public schools:

- Laurentian Elementary School in Lachute serves almost all areas
- Grenville Elementary School in Grenville serves a small section of Chatham
- Laurentian Regional High School in Lachute serves all areas

== See also ==
- List of anglophone communities in Quebec
- List of cities in Quebec
