= Chatham, Quebec =

District in Canada

Coordinates: 45°40′10″N 74°26′33″W

The township municipality of Chatham (French pronunciation: [ʃatam]) is a former municipality now part of the current city of Brownsburg-Chatham, Quebec, Canada.

Prior to October 6, 1999, Chatham was an independent municipality; on that date, it and the village of Brownsburg were merged into the new municipality of Brownsburg-Chatham.

== History ==
Chatham was founded in 1855. The original territory included the entire territory of the current city of Brownsburg-Chatham and a section of the current city of Lachute. In 1935, Chatham lost an important section of its territory when Brownsburg was created. In 1952, another section split from Chatham for the creation of Ayersville (today part of Lachute). In 1999, Chatham was merged with Brownsburg to create the current city of Brownsburg-Chatham.

== Demographics ==
Historical census populations – Chatham (Township) 1855–1999

Year	Pop.	±%
1871	3,422	—
1881	3,985	+16.5%
1891	3,371	−15.4%
1901	3,327	−1.3%
1911	3,576	+7.5%
1921	3,914	+9.5%

Year	Pop.	±%
1931	3,928	+0.4%
1941	2,836	−27.8%
1951	4,014	+41.5%
1956	2,394	−40.4%
1961	2,822	+17.9%
1966	2,818	−0.1%

Year	Pop.	±%
1971	3,082	+9.4%
1976	3,402	+10.4%
1981	3,531	+3.8%
1986	3,587	+1.6%
1991	3,582	−0.1%
1996	4,100	+14.5%

Population counts are not adjusted for boundary changes.
Source: Statistics Canada
