= Madeleine Dansereau =

Canadian artist and educator (1922 - 1991)

- Born: 1922
- Died: March 20, 1991 (aged 68–69); Montreal
- Occupations: Artist and educator

Madeleine Dansereau (1922 – March 20, 1991) was a Canadian artist and educator. She was the first woman jeweler in Quebec. She was also known as Madeleine Maranda-Dansereau.

Dansereau was born Madeleine Maranda in Montreal and studied painting at the École des beaux-arts de Montréal with Arthur Lismer and Jacques de Tonnancour. In 1953, she married Arthur Dansereau; the couple had two daughters. From 1959 to 1965, she studied in the Swiss jeweler Philippe Vauthier's workshop in Montreal. In 1973, she founded the École de joaillerie et de métaux d'Art, a school of jewelry making and metal artwork, with Armand Brochard who was a jeweller originally from Belgium. From 1977 to 1990, she showed her work in New York City, Los Angeles, Montreal and Toronto.

In 1981, Dansereau designed the "Grand Montréalais" trophy. In 1985, she designed the medals awarded for the National Order of Quebec.

She died in Montreal in 1991. In June 1996, the Montreal Museum of Fine Arts held an exhibition of her work. Her work is held in the collections of the Montreal Museum of Fine Arts and the Canadian Museum of History. Rue Madeleine-Dansereau in Montreal was named in her honour. In 2001, the Société de développement des entreprises culturelles established the Prix Madeleine-Dansereau.
