= Georges-Étienne Dansereau =

Canadian politician (1898–1959)

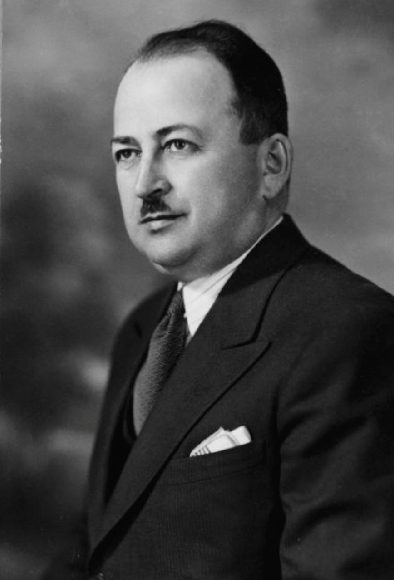

Member of the Legislative Assembly of Quebec for Argenteuil
- In office 1935–1948
- Preceded by: Georges Dansereau
- Succeeded by: William McOuat Cottingham

Personal details
- Born: August 12, 1898 Sainte-Agathe-des-Monts, Quebec
- Died: February 20, 1959 (aged 60) Grenville, Quebec
- Party: Liberal
- Cabinet: Minister without Portfolio; Minister of Public Works; Minister of Roads

Georges-Étienne Dansereau (August 12, 1898 – February 20, 1959) was a Canadian politician.

== Biography ==
Born in Sainte-Agathe-des-Monts, Quebec, the son of Georges Dansereau, a politician, and Herminie Larose, Dansereau was educated at the École de Grenville and the Collège Sainte-Marie in Montreal. In 1918, he started working with his father in Grenville, Quebec in his timber company. He succeeded his father as president in 1935.

From 1935 to 1949, he was mayor of Grenville. He was elected to the Legislative Assembly of Quebec for Argenteuil in 1935. He was re-elected in 1936, 1939, and 1944. He was a Minister without Portfolio in the cabinet of Adélard Godbout in 1939. He was Minister of Public Works from 1942 to 1944 and Minister of Roads in 1944. He was defeated in 1948.

He was made a Knight of the Order of St. Sylvester in 1958.

He died in Grenville in 1959.
