= Agnès Grondin =

Canadian politician

Member of the National Assembly of Quebec for Argenteuil
- In office October 1, 2018 – August 27, 2026
- Preceded by: Yves St-Denis
- Succeeded by: Pierre Nantel

Personal details
- Born: 1967 Lachute, Quebec
- Party: Coalition Avenir Québec

Agnès Grondin is a Canadian politician who was elected to the National Assembly of Quebec in the 2018 provincial election. She represented the electoral district of Argenteuil as a member of the Coalition Avenir Québec. She did not seek re-election in the 2026 general election.

== Electoral record ==
2022 Quebec general election: Argenteuil
Party	Candidate	Votes	%	±%
Coalition Avenir Québec	Agnès Grondin	14,725	45.10	+6.23
Parti Québécois	François Girard	5,291	16.21	-4.93
Conservative	Karim Elayoubi	4,807	14.72	+13.17
Québec solidaire	Marcel Lachaine	3,523	10.79	-1.38
Liberal	Philippe LeBel	3,325	10.18	-7.23
Canadian	Jean Lalonde	436	1.34	–
Green	Luis Alvarez	429	1.31	-0.50
Démocratie directe	Marie-Eve Milot	113	0.35	–
Total valid votes		32,649	98.51	–
Total rejected ballots		495	1.49	+0.02
Turnout		33,144	64.17	-1.16
Electors on the lists		51,647	–	–
Coalition Avenir Québec hold		Swing		+5.58

2018 Quebec general election: Argenteuil
Party	Candidate	Votes	%	±%
Coalition Avenir Québec	Agnès Grondin	11,848	38.88	+15.26
Parti Québécois	Patrick Côté	6,443	21.14	-10.67
Liberal	Bernard Bigras-Denis	5,306	17.41	-20.84
Québec solidaire	Céline Lachapelle	3,710	12.17	+7.6
Independent	Yves St-Denis	1,778	5.83	
Green	Carole Thériault	552	1.81	+0.6
Conservative	Sherwin Edwards	472	1.55	
Parti libre	Stéphanie Boyer	233	0.76	
Citoyens au pouvoir	Louise Wiseman	135	0.44	
Total valid votes		30,477	98.52	
Total rejected ballots		457	1.48	
Turnout		30,934	65.33	
Eligible voters		47,351		
Coalition Avenir Québec gain from Liberal		Swing		+12.97
Source(s) "Rapport des résultats officiels du scrutin". Élections Québec.
