= Bonaventure (Province of Canada electoral district) =

Electoral district in former Province of Canada

Bonaventure Canada East
Province of Canada electoral district

Defunct pre-Confederation electoral district
- Legislature: Legislative Assembly of the Province of Canada
- District created: 1841
- District abolished: 1867
- First contested: 1841
- Last contested: 1863

Bonaventure was an electoral district of the Legislative Assembly of the Parliament of the Province of Canada, in Canada East. It was created in 1841, based on the previous electoral district of the same name for the Legislative Assembly of Lower Canada. It was represented by one member in the Legislative Assembly.

The district was located in the Gaspé peninsula. It was abolished in 1867, upon the creation of Canada and the province of Quebec.

== Boundaries ==
The Union Act, 1840 merged the two provinces of Upper Canada and Lower Canada into the Province of Canada, with a single Parliament. The separate parliaments of Lower Canada and Upper Canada were abolished.

The Union Act provided that the pre-existing electoral boundaries of Lower Canada and Upper Canada would continue to be used in the new Parliament, unless altered by the Union Act itself. The Beauhanois electoral district of Lower Canada was not altered by the Act, and therefore continued with the same boundaries which had been set by a statute of Lower Canada in 1829:

The County of Bonaventure shall be bounded on the east and north, by the County of Gaspé, and shall consist of such part of the Inferior District of Gaspé, as is included between the said County of Gaspé and the District of Quebec, including all the Islands in front thereof, in whole or in part, nearest to the said County, which County so bounded, comprises the Seigniory of Shoolbred, the Indian Village of Mission and the settlements above and below the same on the north of the River Ristigouche, the townships or settlements of Carlton, Maria, Richmond, Hamilton, including Bonaventure, Cox including the Town of New Carlisle, Hope including Paspebiac, La Nouvelle and Port Daniel.

The electoral district covered territory in the Gaspé Peninsula, now included in the Bonaventure Regional County Municipality and the Avignon Regional County Municipality. The elections were held at Richmond and at Hope.

== Members of the Legislative Assembly (1841–1867) ==
Bonaventure was a single-member constituency.

The following were the members of the Legislative Assembly for Beauharnois. The party affiliations are based on the biographies of individual members given by the National Assembly of Quebec, as well as votes in the Legislative Assembly. "Party" was a fluid concept, especially during the early years of the Province of Canada.

| Parliament | Member | Years in Office | Party |
|---|---|---|---|
| 1st Parliament; 1841–1844 | John Robinson Hamilton | 1841–1844 | Anti-unionist and Independent |
| 2nd Parliament; 1844–1847 | John Le Boutillier | 1844–1847 | "British" Tory |
| 3rd Parliament; 1848–1851 | William Cuthbert | 1848–1851 | "British" Tory |
| 4th Parliament; 1851–1854 | David Le Boutillier | 1851–1854 | Ministerialist |
| 5th Parliament; 1854–1857 | John Meagher | 1854–1861 | Ministerialist |
| 6th Parliament; 1858–1861 | John Meagher | 1854–1861 | Bleu |
| 7th Parliament; 1861–1863 | Théodore Robitaille | 1861–1867 | Bleu |
| 8th Parliament; 1863–1867 | Théodore Robitaille | 1861–1867 | Bleu |

== Abolition ==
The district was abolished on July 1, 1867, when the British North America Act, 1867 came into force, splitting the Province of Canada into Quebec and Ontario. It was succeeded by electoral districts of the same name in the House of Commons of Canada and the Legislative Assembly of Quebec.

== See also ==
- List of elections in the Province of Canada
