= David Le Boutillier =

David Le Boutillier (October 14, 1811 – 1854) was a political figure in Canada East. He represented Bonaventure in the Legislative Assembly of the Province of Canada from 1852 to 1854 as a Reformer. His name also appears as David Le Bouthillier.

He was born in Saint John in Jersey, the son of Josué Le Boutillier and Anne Amy, and settled at Paspébiac in 1827. At first, he apprenticed as a clerk with Charles Robin and Company. In 1838, Le Boutillier entered the trade in salt cod, forming the company Le Boutillier Brothers. The company had fishing operations in Gaspé, New Brunswick and Labrador and traded with the West Indies and ports on the Mediterranean. Le Boutillier did not run for reelection to the assembly in 1854. He is thought to have never married and probably died at Paspébiac.
