= Lucien Grenier =

Lucien Grenier may refer to:

- Lucien Grenier (ice hockey) (born 1946), Canadian National Hockey League player
- Lucien Grenier (politician) (1925–1998), Canadian lawyer and politician
