= Pierre-Clovis Beauchesne =

Canadian politician (1841–1918)

Member of the Canadian Parliament for Bonaventure
- In office 1879–1882
- Preceded by: Théodore Robitaille
- Succeeded by: Louis-Joseph Riopel

Member of the Legislative Assembly of Quebec for Bonaventure
- In office 1874–1876
- Preceded by: Théodore Robitaille
- Succeeded by: Joseph Israël Tarte

Personal details
- Born: 8 June 1841 Bécancour, Canada East
- Died: 10 October 1918 (aged 77) Montreal, Quebec

Pierre-Clovis Beauchesne (8 June 1841 – 10 October 1918) was a Canadian politician.

Born in Bécancour, Canada East, the son of Pierre Bourbeau dit Beauchesne and Marie-Archange Pérenne de Moras (Archange Maurâce), Beauchesne was educated at Nicolet College and became a notary in 1865. He was a notary in Gaspésie and was a fish inspector. As well he was a customs collector from 1871 to 1874. He was elected to the Legislative Assembly of Quebec in an 1874 by-election in the electoral district of Bonaventure. A Conservative, he was re-elected in 1875. In 1876, the election was declared void and he did not run in the resulting by-election. In an 1879 by-election, he was elected to the House of Commons of Canada for the electoral district of Bonaventure. A Conservative, he did not run in 1882. He was a major in the Bonaventure Reserve Militia.

He died in Montreal in 1918 and was buried in Notre Dame des Neiges Cemetery.
