= Albert Béchard =

Canadian politician (1922–2002)

Albert Béchard B.A., LL.L.
- Official 1974 portrait

Member of the Canadian Parliament for Bonaventure
- In office 1962–1979
- Preceded by: Lucien Grenier
- Succeeded by: Rémi Bujold

Personal details
- Born: November 18, 1922 Saint-Alexis-de-Matapédia, Quebec, Canada
- Died: April 28, 2002 (aged 79)
- Occupation: Notary

Albert Béchard (November 18, 1922, in Saint-Alexis-de-Matapédia, Quebec, Canada – April 28, 2002) was a Canadian politician and notary. He was elected to the House of Commons of Canada as a Member of the Liberal Party in the 1962 election to represent the riding of Bonaventure. He was re-elected in the elections of 1963, 1965, 1968, 1972 and 1974, the latter two for the renamed riding of Bonaventure—Îles-de-la-Madeleine. During his federal political career, he served as Parliamentary Secretary to the Secretary of State (1966–1968), then Parliamentary Secretary to the Minister of Justice and Attorney General (1970–1972). He also served as Deputy Chair of Committees of the Whole (1968–1970). He also chaired the House of Commons Standing Committee on Fisheries and Forestry (1973–1977) and sat on numerous other committees including the joint committee Standing Committee on Regulations and other Statutory Instruments.
