= William Le Boutillier Fauvel =

Canadian politician

Member of the Canadian Parliament for Bonaventure
- In office 1891–1897
- Preceded by: Louis-Joseph Riopel
- Succeeded by: Jean-François Guité

Personal details
- Born: January 5, 1850 Percé, Canada East
- Died: February 8, 1897 (aged 47) Paspébiac, Quebec, Canada
- Party: Liberal
- Children: Bertram Auguste
- Occupation: Politician, Merchant, Ship-owner

William LeBoutillier Fauvel (January 5, 1850 – February 8, 1897) was a Merchant and Political figure in Quebec, Canada. He represented Bonaventure in the House of Commons of Canada from 1891 to 1897 as a Liberal member.

== Biography ==
He was born in Percé, Canada East, the son of John Fauvel and Henriette-Marie Le Boutillier, both originally from Jersey, and was educated in Jersey. He entered the cod trade with his Father and, with his older brothers, John Bertram and George Philip, took over the Business when his Father retired in 1879. He settled at Paspébiac. Fauvel married Emma Du Heaume in 1881. In 1886, he became interim manager for Le Boutillier Brothers on behalf of its creditors and decided to purchase the Business with other partners. Fauvel served as Mayor of New Carlisle and was vice-consul for Portugal at Paspébiac. He was also president of the Agricultural Society for Bonaventure. With the support of Quebec premier Honoré Mercier, Fauvel was elected in the Bonaventure riding in the 1891 federal election. Fauvel also served as campaign manager for François-Xavier Lemieux when Lemieux ran for a seat in the Quebec assembly in 1894. Fauvel was re-elected in 1896 but died in office at Paspébiac the following year at the age of 47.
