= Bona Arsenault =

Canadian politician

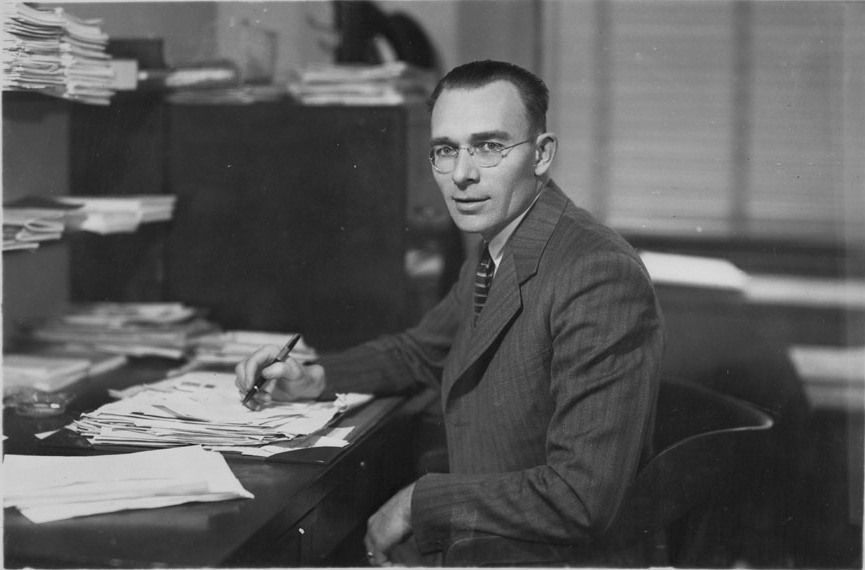

Member of the National Assembly of Quebec for Matapédia
- In office 1968–1976
- Preceded by: Clovis Gagnon
- Succeeded by: Léopold Marquis

Member of the Canadian Parliament for Bonaventure
- In office 1945–1957
- Preceded by: Alphée Poirier
- Succeeded by: Nérée Arsenault

Personal details
- Born: October 4, 1903 Bonaventure, Quebec
- Died: July 4, 1993 (aged 89)
- Party: Liberal
- Other political affiliations: Quebec Liberal Party
- Cabinet: Quebec: Minister of Lands and Forests (1960–1962); Minister of Fisheries and Game (1962–1963); Provincial Secretary (1963–1966)

Bona Arsenault, CM (October 4, 1903 – July 4, 1993) was a Canadian historian, genealogist and a federal and provincial politician.

== Biography ==
Born in Bonaventure, Quebec, the son of Joseph-Georges Arsenault and Marcelline Gauthier, he studied at Université Laval and University of Connecticut.

In the 1931 Quebec provincial elections, he ran unsuccessfully in the riding of Bonaventure and lost again in 1935 in the riding of Gaspé-Sud. Switching to the federal scene, in 1940, he ran as a National Government candidate in the Quebec riding of Bonaventure and was defeated. He was elected as an Independent candidate in the 1945 election. And was re-elected in 1949 and 1953, as a Liberal candidate. He was defeated in 1957.

Turning back to provincial politics, he was elected in 1960 as a Liberal in the riding of Matapédia. He was re-elected in 1962, 1966, 1970, and 1973. He was defeated in 1976. He was also a cabinet minister hold various posts in the Jean Lesage government, and he wrote the book Histoire et généalogie des Acadiens. In 1980, he was made a Member of the Order of Canada.

His grandson, by marriage, is NHL hall of fame player and coach Patrick Roy.
