= William Cuthbert (Canadian politician) =

William Cuthbert (c. 1795 – August 3, 1854) was a Scottish-born farmer, businessman and political figure in Canada East. He represented Bonaventure in the Legislative Assembly of the Province of Canada from 1848 to 1851 as a Tory.

He was born in Alloway and settled at New Richmond between 1810 and 1825. With his brother Robert in Scotland, he formed William Cuthbert and Company which imported goods and was involved in the timber trade and the export of cod. In 1828, he was named a justice of the peace for the Gaspé district. He married Christiana, the daughter of Donald Montgomery, in 1832. In 1833, he built a sawmill at the mouth of the Petite Cascapédia River. Cuthbert also owned a flour mill and another sawmill. It is also believed that he built a number of ships at New Richmond and was a major landowner in the Baie des Chaleurs region. Cuthbert was a major in the local militia, later reaching the rank of lieutenant-colonel. Because of ill health, he was not present in the assembly for much of his term and did not run for reelection in 1851. Cuthbert travelled to Liverpool, England in July 1854. He died in Rock Ferry at the home of his nephew, a doctor, the following month.

His wife's brothers John and Donald were prominent politicians in Prince Edward Island and New Brunswick, respectively. Cuthbert was probably related to James Cuthbert, Jr. and Ross Cuthbert who served in the assembly for Lower Canada.
