= Clovis Gagnon =

Canadian politician (1926–2022)

Member of the National Assembly of Quebec for Matapédia
- In office July 9, 1953 – July 6, 1960
- Preceded by: Philippe Cossette
- Succeeded by: Bona Arsenault

Personal details
- Born: January 6, 1926 Le Bic, Quebec, Canada
- Died: June 22, 2022 (aged 96) Longueuil, Quebec, Canada
- Party: Union Nationale
- Education: Université Laval
- Profession: Lawyer

Clovis Gagnon (January 6, 1926 – June 22, 2022) was a Canadian politician in the province of Quebec.

Gagnon was born in Le Bic, Quebec in 1926, one of seven children born to Émile Gagnon and Blanche Roy. His father was a notary. He attended Séminaire de Rimouski from 1939 to 1947, then Université Laval from 1946 to 1950 where he earned a law degree. Gagnon was a Union Nationale member of the National Assembly of Quebec for Matapédia from 1953 to 1960, having first been elected in a by-election following the death of Philippe Cossette in a motor vehicle accident. Gagnon was the parliamentary assistant to the Minister of Lands and Forests in 1960, and deputy whip in 1955. He served until his defeat by Bona Arsenault in the 1960 election, and also ran unsuccessfully in 1962.
