= John Robinson Hamilton =

Politician in Lower Canada and Province of Canada

John Robinson Hamilton, QC

Member of the Legislative Assembly of Lower Canada for Bonaventure
- In office 1832–1834
- Preceded by: John Gosset

Member of the Legislative Assembly of the Province of Canada for Bonaventure
- In office 1841–1844
- Preceded by: New position
- Succeeded by: John Le Boutillier

Personal details
- Born: March 5, 1808 Quebec City, Lower Canada
- Died: December 24, 1870 (aged 62) New Carlisle, Quebec
- Resting place: St Andrew's Church, Anglican, New Carlisle
- Party: Anti-unionist; Reformer
- Spouse: Eliza Racey
- Children: Four daughters and five sons, including Clarence Hamilton
- Profession: Lawyer

John Robinson Hamilton, QC (March 5, 1808 – December 24, 1870) was a lawyer and political figure in Lower Canada and then the Province of Canada. He represented the electoral district of Bonaventure 1832 to 1834 in the Legislative Assembly of Lower Canada. Following the creation of the Province of Canada, he again represented Bonaventure from 1841 to 1844 in the Legislative Assembly of the Province of Canada. He opposed the union of Lower Canada and Upper Canada into the Province of Canada, and supported the reform movement, which favoured responsible government.

== Early life and family ==
Hamilton was born in Quebec City, the son of Gavin Major Hamilton, a merchant, and Mary Robinson. His father died young, when Hamilton was only eleven years old. His mother later married a French-Canadian, François Pellet, which may have accounted for Hamilton's fluent bilingualism.

He studied law with Joseph-Rémi Vallières de Saint-Réal, and then Andrew Stuart and Henry Black, in Quebec City. Hamilton was called to the bar in 1830 and moved to the Gaspé to begin his practice. In 1844, he was appointed Queen's Counsel, a mark of distinction and service in the legal profession.

In 1831, he married Eliza Racey in New York city. They had four daughters and five sons. One son, Clarence Hamilton served in the Legislative Assembly of Quebec.

== Political career ==
=== Lower Canada ===
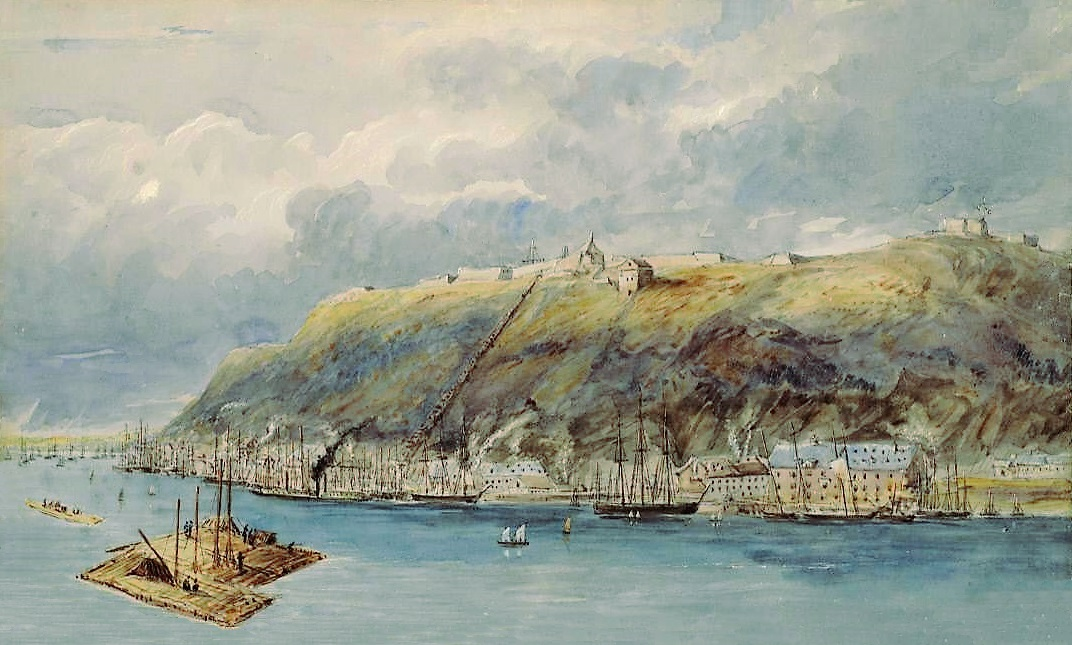
View of Quebec from the River St Lawrence, 1827

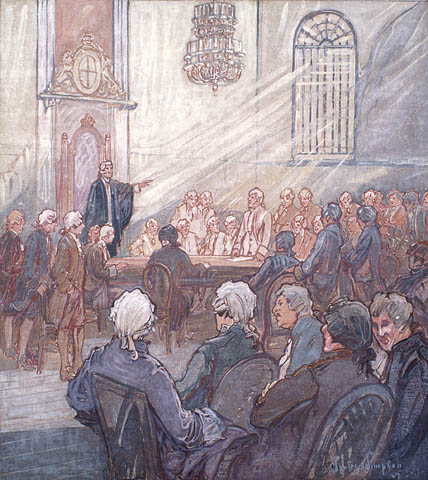
Legislative Assembly of Lower Canada, meeting in the Bishop's Chapel, Quebec

In the general election of 1830, Hamilton stood for election to the Legislative Assembly but was apparently defeated by John Gosset. Hamilton brought an election petition, challenging Gosset's election. Lengthy debate occurred in the Assembly, which finally ruled in December 1832 that Hamilton had been elected. He took his seat at that point. In the Assembly, Hamilton took an independent approach, sometimes supporting the Château Clique Tories, and sometimes the Parti patriote. However, he voted against the Ninety-Two Resolutions, put forward by Louis-Joseph Papineau and the Parti patriote, which called on the British government to make significant reforms to the provincial government.

Hamilton was defeated when he ran for reelection to the Lower Canada Assembly in 1834.

=== Province of Canada ===
Following the rebellion in Lower Canada, and the similar rebellion in 1837 in Upper Canada (now Ontario), the British government decided to merge the two provinces into a single province, as recommended by Lord Durham in the Durham Report. The Union Act, 1840, passed by the British Parliament, abolished the two provinces and their separate parliaments, and created the Province of Canada, with a single parliament for the entire province, composed of an elected Legislative Assembly and an appointed Legislative Council. The Governor General retained a strong position in the government.

Hamilton stood for election in the first general election in the new province, in 1841. He was elected to the Legislative Assembly of the Province of Canada.

In the new Assembly, Hamilton continued to take an independent approach. In the first session, he was an opponent of the new union, but also tended to support the government of the Governor-General, Lord Sydenham. Over the next sessions, he tended to support the Reform group, but in 1843, when the Reform ministry resigned, he supported the new governor-general, Sir Charles Metcalfe.

Hamilton was defeated in his bid for re-election in 1844, and in subsequent elections of 1848 and 1851. He ran unsuccessfully for a seat in the Legislative Council in 1858.

== Death ==
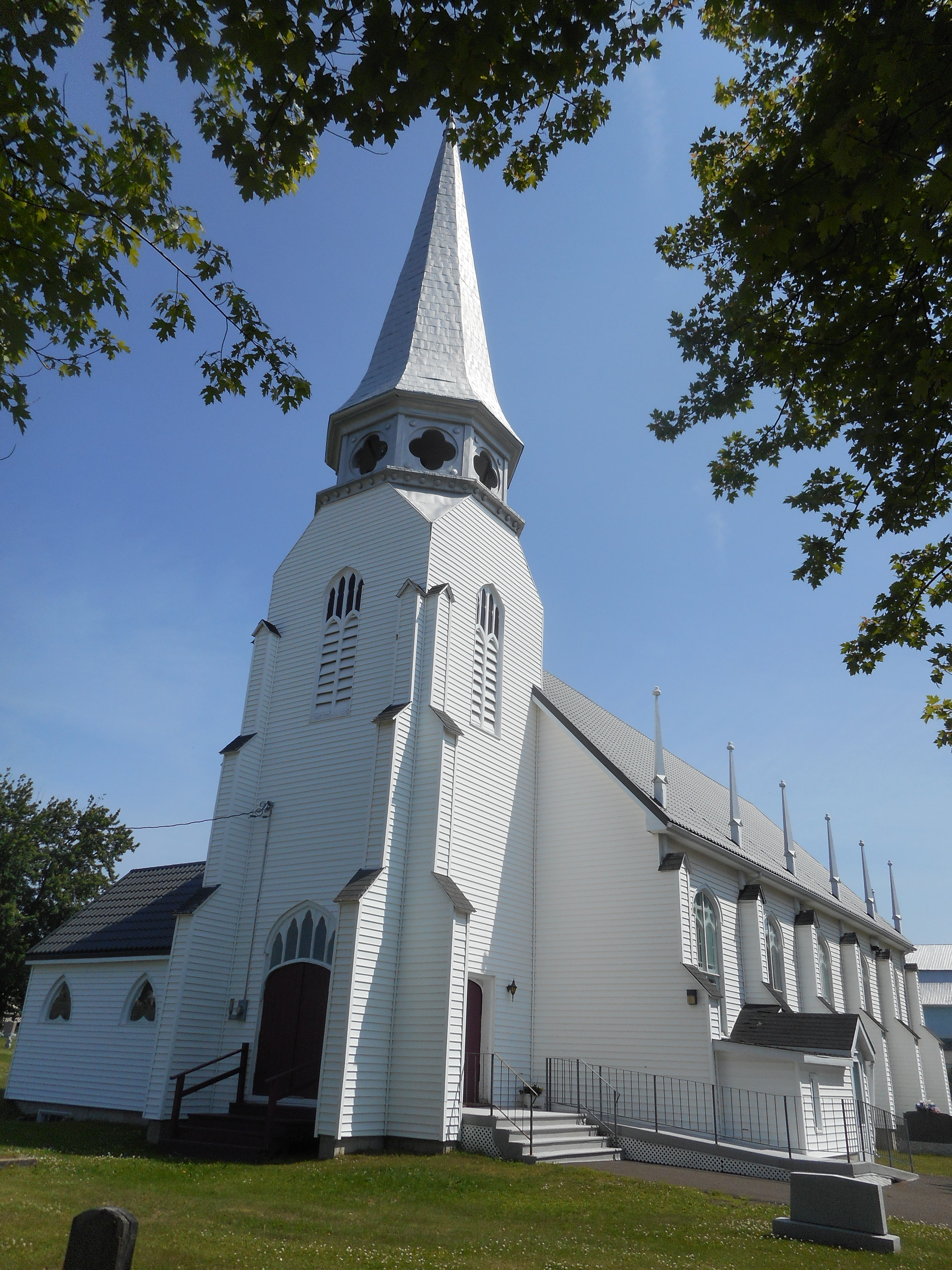
St Andrew's Anglican Church, Hamilton's burial site

He died at New Carlisle in 1870 at the age of 62, and is buried at St Andrew's Anglican church, New Carlisle.

== See also ==
1st Parliament of the Province of Canada
