= Pierre-Émile Côté =

Canadian politician

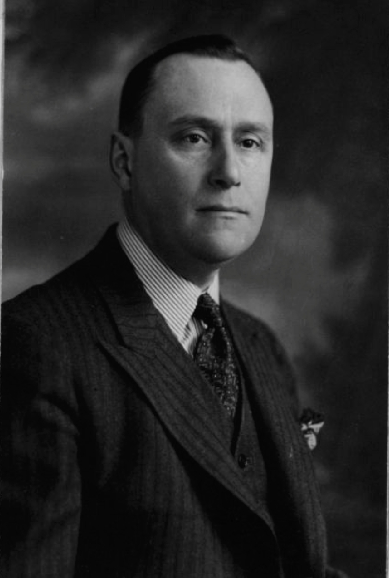

Member of the Canadian Parliament for Bonaventure
- In office 1937–1939
- Preceded by: Charles Marcil
- Succeeded by: J.-Alphée Poirier

Member of the Legislative Assembly of Quebec for Bonaventure
- In office 1924–1936
- Preceded by: Joseph-Fabien Bugeaud
- Succeeded by: Henri Jolicoeur
- In office 1939–1944
- Preceded by: Henri Jolicoeur
- Succeeded by: Henri Jolicoeur

Personal details
- Born: December 7, 1887 Lévis, Quebec
- Died: August 3, 1950 (aged 62) Quebec City, Quebec
- Party: Quebec Liberal Party
- Other political affiliations: Liberal Party of Canada

Pierre-Émile Côté (December 7, 1887 – August 3, 1950) was a Canadian politician.

== Biography ==
Born in Lévis, Quebec, the son of Pierre Côté and Joséphine Émond, Côté was educated at the Séminaire de Québec, the Académie commerciale de Québec, Collège de Lévis, and the Université Laval in Quebec City. He was called to the Bar of Quebec in 1913. He practised law in New Carlisle from 1919 to 1942.

He was first elected to the Legislative Assembly of Quebec for the Liberals in a 1924 by-election for Bonaventure. He was acclaimed in 1927 and re-elected in 1931 and 1935. He was Minister of Highways from March to August 1936; however, he was defeated in 1936. He then turned to federal politics and was elected to the House of Commons of Canada for the Liberals in a 1937 by-election for Bonaventure. However, he resigned in 1939 to return to provincial politics and was elected in the 1939 Quebec general election. He was Minister of Lands and Forests, Fish and Game from 1941 to 1942. He resigned in 1942 when he was appointed a judge of the Quebec Superior Court.

He died in Quebec City in 1950.
