= Clarence Hamilton =

Canadian politician

Member of the Legislative Assembly of Quebec for Bonaventure
- In office 1867–1871
- Succeeded by: Théodore Robitaille

Personal details
- Born: December 29, 1833 New Carlisle, Lower Canada
- Died: January 14, 1894 (aged 60) Longue-Pointe near Mingan, Quebec
- Party: Liberal

Clarence Hamilton (December 29, 1833 – January 14, 1894) was a merchant and political figure in Quebec. He represented Bonaventure in the Legislative Assembly of Quebec from 1867 to 1871 as a Liberal.

He was born in New Carlisle, Lower Canada, the son of John Robinson Hamilton and Eliza Racey, and was educated at Quebec City. He owned a fishing operation at Longue-Pointe near Mingan and was also involved in the export of fish. Hamilton married Jane Wiley. He was defeated by Théodore Robitaille when he ran for reelection in 1871. Hamilton died at Longue-Pointe at the age of 60 and was buried in New Carlisle.
