= Rémi Bujold =

Canadian lawyer and politician

The Honourable Rémi Bujold PC CM

Member of Parliament for Bonaventure—Îles-de-la-Madeleine
- In office May 22, 1979 – July 4, 1984
- Preceded by: Albert Béchard
- Succeeded by: Darryl Gray

Personal details
- Born: Joseph Roger Rémi Bujold; October 18, 1944 (age 81)
- Party: Liberal

Joseph Roger Rémi Bujold, PC CM (born October 18, 1944) is a Canadian lawyer and former politician.

Bujold was first elected to the House of Commons of Canada in the 1979 federal election as the Liberal Member of Parliament for Bonaventure—Îles-de-la-Madeleine. The Liberal party was defeated in the election, and Bujold joined the Liberals on the opposition benches. He was re-elected in the 1980 election that defeated the Progressive Conservative government and returned the Liberals to power.

In 1981, he became Parliamentary Secretary to the Minister of Employment and Immigration. He became Chairman of the federal Liberal caucus in 1983. In June 1984, Trudeau's successor, John Turner, brought Bujold into the Cabinet as Minister of State for regional development. Both the Turner government and Bujold were defeated in the 1984 federal election.

Bujold attempted to regain his seat in the 1988 federal election but was unsuccessful.

Bujold is a former Chair of the Canadian Landmine Foundation, and also a former chair of the board of the Council for Canadian Unity, an organization that he joined in 1990.

In 1996, he was made a Member of the Order of Canada.
