= Jean-François Guité =

Canadian politician (1852–1917)

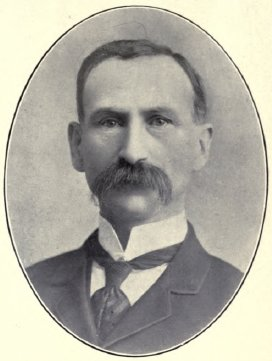

Member of the Canadian Parliament for Bonaventure
- In office 1897–1900
- Preceded by: William Le Boutillier Fauvel
- Succeeded by: Charles Marcil

Personal details
- Born: March 30, 1852 Maria, Canada East
- Died: September 17, 1917 (aged 65)
- Party: Liberal

Jean-François Guité (March 30, 1852 – September 17, 1917) was a Canadian politician.

Born in Maria, Canada East, Guité was a lumber merchant by profession, and on his wife's side (Madeleine Caron from Perce, Que.) a descendant of Louis Hebert, who first arrived with Jacques Cartier at Port Royal, N.S., in 1606. He was elected to the House of Commons of Canada after the death of the sitting MP, William LeBoutillier Fauvel by Guite's father's first cousin Sir Alphonse Pelletier, Speaker of Canada's Senate who later became Lieutenant Governor of Quebec. A Liberal, he did not run in 1900 election.
