= Vingtaine de Hérupe =

Vingtaine in Saint John, Jersey

Vingtaine de Hérupe Hérupe
- Vingtaine
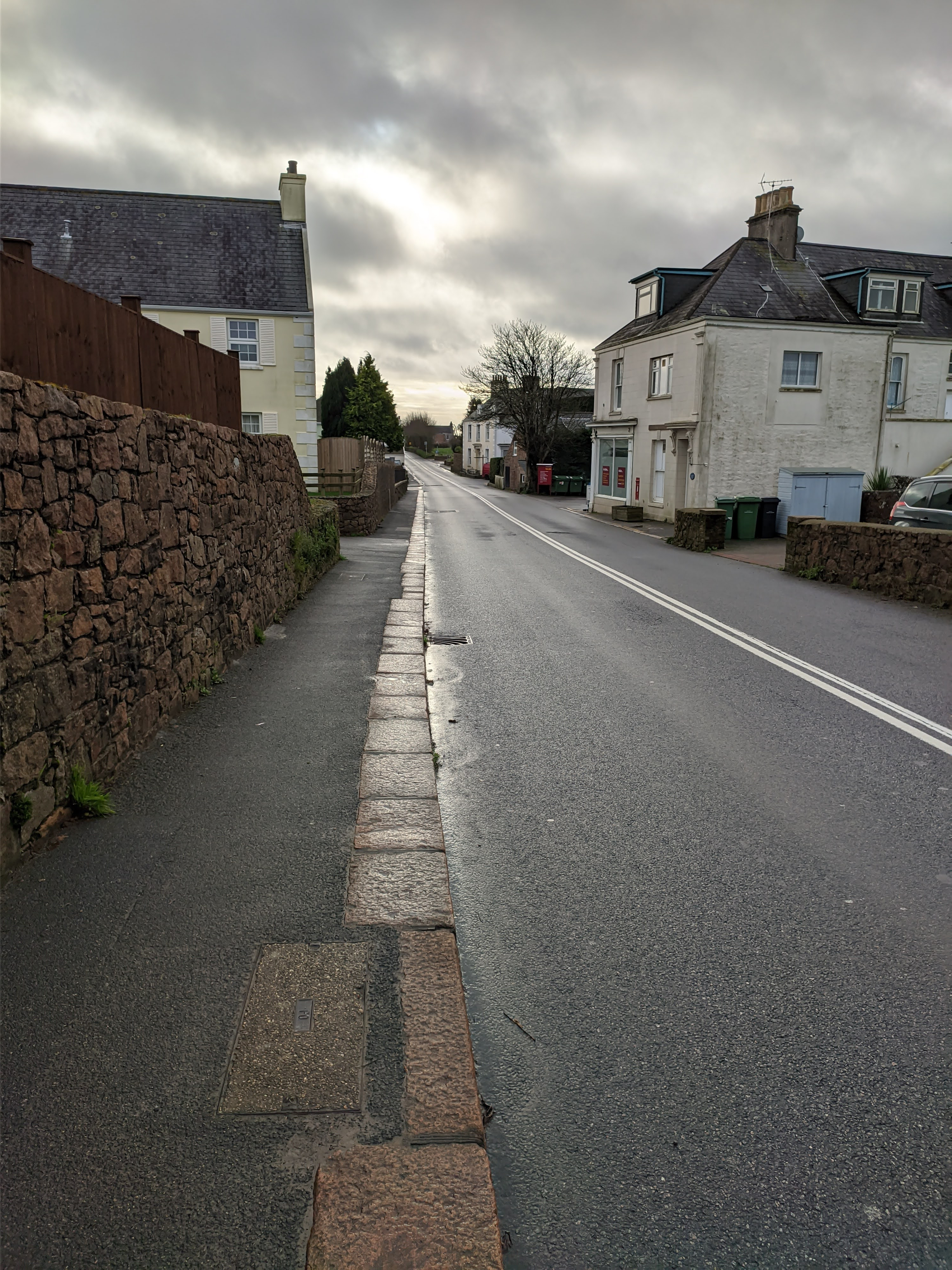
- Sion Village is the main settlement

- Location within Jersey Location within Channel Islands
- Coordinates: 49°13′44″N 2°07′11″W
- Country: Jersey
- Parish: Saint John

Population (January 1, 2021)
  - Total: 861
- Time zone: UTC+00:00
- Postal code: JE3–4EJ

Vingtaine de Hérupe is one of the three vingtaines of the Parish of St John in Jersey, Channel Islands. It contains the village of Sion, Centre Stone and the Macpéla cemetery.

The Vingtaine de Hérupe, Vingtaine du Nord and Vingtaine du Douet all form a single electoral district of St John.

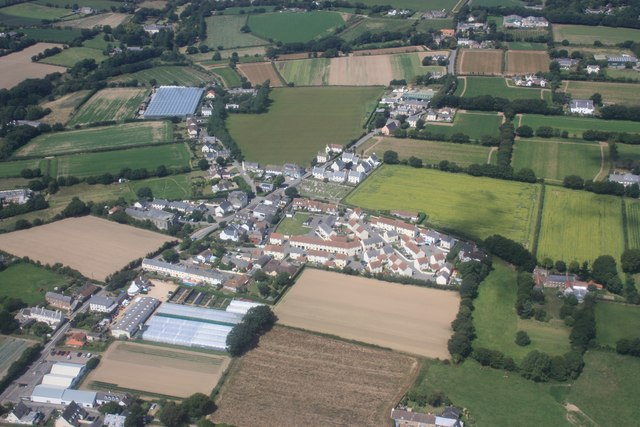
Le Becquet Servais (Sion)

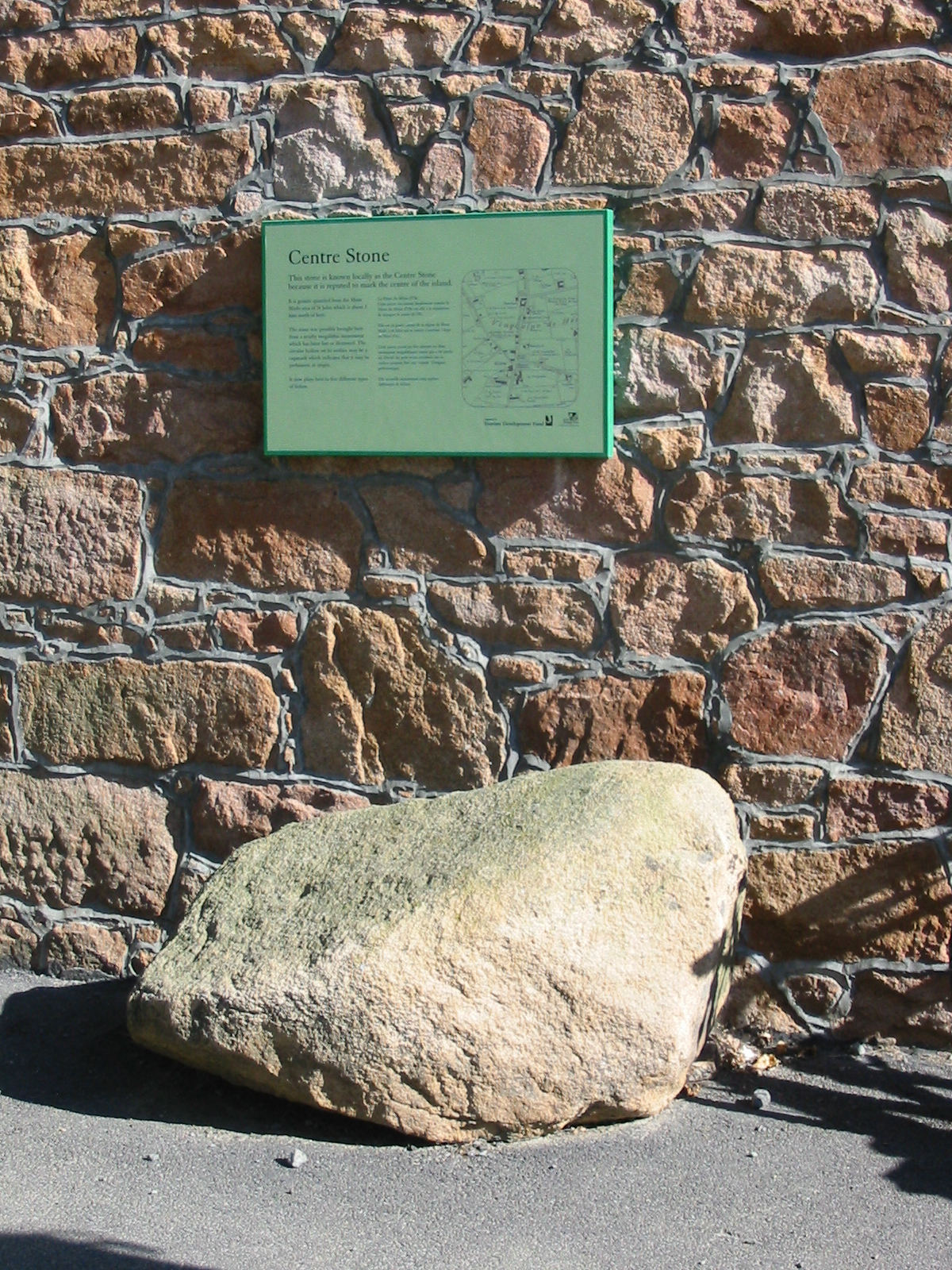
Centre Stone

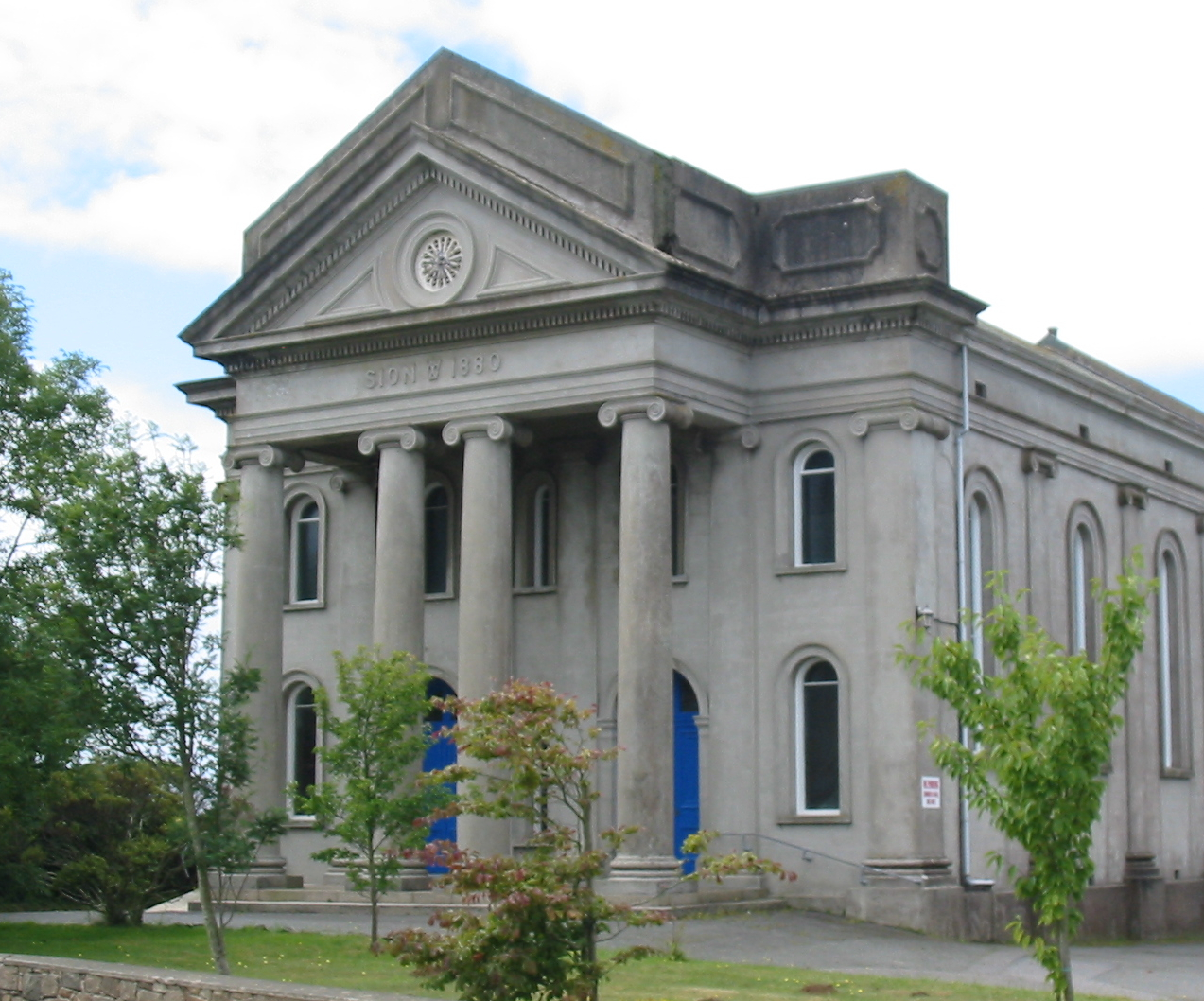
Sion Methodist church
