= Charles Marcil =

Canadian politician

The Honourable Charles Marcil PC
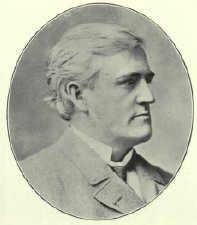

12th Speaker of the House of Commons of Canada
- In office January 20, 1909 – November 14, 1911
- Preceded by: Robert Franklin Sutherland
- Succeeded by: Thomas Simpson Sproule

Member of the Canadian Parliament for Bonaventure
- In office 1900–1937
- Preceded by: Jean-François Guité
- Succeeded by: Pierre-Émile Côté

Personal details
- Born: July 1, 1860 Saint-Scholastique, Canada East
- Died: January 29, 1937 (aged 76) Westboro, Ottawa, Ontario
- Party: Liberal

Charles Marcil, PC (July 1, 1860 – January 29, 1937) was a longtime member of the House of Commons of Canada and served as Speaker of the House from 1909 to 1911.

He was first elected to the House of Commons as a Liberal Member of Parliament (MP) in the 1900 election and represented the riding of Bonaventure Quebec in the Gaspé Peninsula without interruption until his death in 1937.

== Biography ==
Marcil was born to a French-Canadian father and Irish mother. His father's family settled in New France around 1665.

Growing up in the Ottawa-Hull area, he served as a House of Commons page, then went on to work as a journalist for the Montreal Gazette and several other newspapers.

Marcil ran unsuccessfully as a candidate for the Quebec Liberal Party in the 1897 provincial election before winning a seat in the federal parliament in 1900.

He worked hard to obtain projects for his community including the construction of bridges, lighthouses and the establishment of a ferry service.

Marcil was nominated for the position of Speaker by Wilfrid Laurier following the 1908 election. Despite initial opposition by Ontario Tories, he was unanimously elected to the position.

He was a popular Speaker and might have continued through a second Parliament had the Liberals not been defeated in the 1911 election. He returned to the backbenches, and concurrently was elected to sit on Montreal's city council as an alderman in 1918 while remaining an MP.

From 1921 to 1931, he served as Chairman of the Liberal caucus in Ottawa. He was Dean of the House from 1930 to his death in 1937.

Charles Marcil was not the only member of his family to be involved in politics. In the late 19th Century, his uncle Doctor David Marsil was mayor of Saint-Eustache, Quebec from 1871 to 1875 and appointed to the Legislative Council of Quebec in 1888. Charles Marcil's brother Georges was the last mayor of Notre-Dame-de-Grâce, before the city was annexed to Montreal in 1910. Georges' granddaughter Susie Marcil was married to Daniel Johnson, Premier of Quebec in 1994.

Another notable relative was Charles Marcil's maternal uncle, Edward P. Doherty, an American Civil War officer who formed and led the detachment of soldiers that captured and killed John Wilkes Booth, the assassin of United States President Abraham Lincoln.
