= Alphée Poirier (MP) =

Canadian politician

Member of Parliament for Bonaventure
- In office March 1940 – September 1944
- Preceded by: Pierre-Émile Côté
- Succeeded by: Bona Arsenault

Personal details
- Born: Joseph Alphée Poirier; 5 February 1899 Bonaventure, Quebec
- Died: 19 September 1944 (aged 45)
- Party: Liberal
- Spouse(s): Germaine Arsenault m. 5 August 1933
- Profession: poultry farmer

Joseph Alphée Poirier (5 February 1899 – 19 September 1944) was a Canadian farmer and politician. Poirier was a Liberal party member of the House of Commons of Canada.

== Biography ==
He was born in Bonaventure, Quebec and became a poultry farmer by career.Poirier attended school at Bonaventure and Rimouski. From 1930 to 1940, he was an instructor for Quebec's provincial Department of Agriculture.

He was first elected to Parliament at the Bonaventure riding in the 1940 general election. Poirier died on 19 September 1944, before completing his term in the 19th Canadian Parliament.
