= Théodore Robitaille =

Canadian politician

The Honourable Théodore Robitaille PC
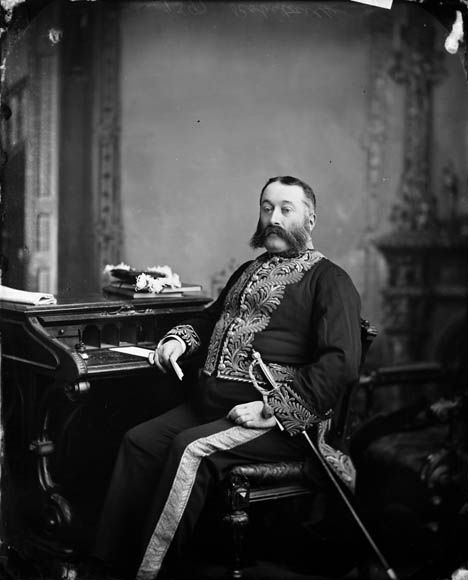

Senator for Gulf, Quebec
- In office January 29, 1885 – August 17, 1897
- Nominated by: John A. Macdonald
- Preceded by: Louis Robitaille
- Succeeded by: Jean-Baptiste Romuald Fiset

4th Lieutenant Governor of Quebec
- In office July 25, 1879 – October 4, 1884
- Monarch: Victoria
- Governors General: Marquess of Lorne; The Marquess of Lansdowne
- Premier: Henri-Gustave Joly de Lotbinière; Joseph-Adolphe Chapleau; Joseph-Alfred Mousseau; John Jones Ross
- Preceded by: Luc Letellier de St-Just
- Succeeded by: Louis-Rodrigue Masson

Member of the Canadian Parliament for Bonaventure
- In office September 20, 1867 – July 25, 1879
- Succeeded by: Pierre-Clovis Beauchesne

Member of the Legislative Assembly of Quebec for Bonaventure
- In office July 1, 1871 – January 7, 1874
- Preceded by: Clarence Hamilton
- Succeeded by: Pierre-Clovis Beauchesne

Member of the Legislative Assembly of the Province of Canada for Bonaventure
- In office 1861–1866

Personal details
- Born: 29 January 1834 Varennes, Lower Canada
- Died: 17 August 1897 (aged 63) New Carlisle, Quebec, Canada
- Party: Conservative
- Spouse: Emma Quesnel (m. 1867)
- Education: McGill College
- Occupation: Physician and businessman
- Profession: Politician
- Cabinet: Receiver General for Canada (1873)

Théodore Robitaille, PC (French pronunciation: [teɔdɔʁ ʁɔbitaj]; 29 January 1834 – 17 August 1897) was a Canadian physician, politician, and the fourth Lieutenant Governor of Quebec.

== Biography ==
Born in Varennes, Lower Canada, the son of Louis-Adolphe Robitaille (pronounced "ro-bee-tie") and Marie-Justine Monjeau, he was baptized as Louis-François-Christophe-Théodore. A physician, he graduated from McGill College in 1858 and settled in New Carlisle, Quebec. In 1861, he was elected to the Legislative Assembly of the Province of Canada for the riding of Bonaventure. In 1867, he was elected to the House of Commons of Canada. A Conservative he was re-elected in 1872, an 1873 ministerial by-election, 1874, and 1878. In 1873, he was appointed Receiver General.

In 1871, he was elected to the Legislative Assembly of Quebec in Bonaventure and served until 1874 when holding a federal and provincial seat was abolished. From 1879 to 1884, he was the Lieutenant Governor of Quebec. Notably, during his tenure he commissioned Calixa Lavallée and Sir Adolphe-Basile Routhier to prepare the music and French lyrics to what would become Canada's national anthem, O Canada. In 1885, he was appointed to the Senate representing the senatorial division of Gulf, Quebec. He served until his death in New Carlisle, Quebec in 1897.

== Archives ==
There are Théodore Robitaille fonds at Library and Archives Canada and Bibliothèque et Archives nationales du Québec.

Political offices
Preceded by Jean-Charles Chapais	Receiver General; 1873	Succeeded by Thomas Coffin
