= Bonaventure (federal electoral district) =

Former federal electoral district in Quebec, Canada

Quebec electoral district

Defunct federal electoral district
- Legislature: House of Commons
- District created: 1867
- District abolished: 1969
- First contested: 1867
- Last contested: 1993

Bonaventure (French pronunciation: [bɔnavɑ̃tyʁ]; later known as Bonaventure—Îles-de-la-Madeleine) was a federal electoral district in the province of Quebec, Canada, that was represented in the House of Commons of Canada from 1867 to 1997. It was created as "Bonaventure" riding by the British North America Act, 1867.

== History ==
In 1933, it was defined to consist of the county of Bonaventure and the municipalities of Ste-Florence, Ste-Marguerite-Marie and Causapscal (parish and village) in the county of Matapedia.

In 1947, it was redefined to consist only of the county of Bonaventure.

In 1952, parts of the county of Matapédia were added: the townships of Assemetquagan and Milnikek, the projected township of Roncevaux and, the township of Assemetquagan in the municipality of Saint-Fidèle-de-Ristigouche.

In 1966, it was defined to consist of the Counties of Bonaventure and Iles-de-la-Madeleine and the Townships of Milnikek and Assemetquagan in the County of Matapédia.

In 1976, it was defined to consist of:

- the Towns of Carleton, Causapscal and New Richmond;
- the Counties of Bonaventure and Iles-de-la-Madeleine; and
- in the County of Matapédia: the parish municipalities of Saint-Jacques-le-Majeur-de-Causapscal and Saint-Raphaël-d'Albertville; the municipalities of Saint-Edmond, Sainte-Florence and Sainte-Marguerite; the Township of Milnikek and that part of the Township of Assemetquagan without local municipal organization.

In 1987, it was defined to consist of

- the towns of Carleton and New Richmond;
- the County of Bonaventure excluding the following: the Parish Municipality of Sainte-Germaine-de-l'Anseaux-Gascons; the Township Municipality of Port-Daniel-Partie-Est; the Territory of Bonaventure-Routhierville portion; and
- the County of Iles-de-la-Madeleine.

The riding's name was changed to "Bonaventure—Îles-de-la-Madeleine" in 1971.

The district was amalgamated into the Gaspé—Bonaventure—Îles-de-la-Madeleine electoral district in 1996.

== Members of Parliament ==
This riding elected the following members of Parliament:

Parliament	Years	Member	Party
Bonaventure
1st	1867–1872	Théodore Robitaille	Conservative
2nd	1872–1873	Théodore Robitaille	Conservative
2nd	1873–1874	Théodore Robitaille	Conservative
3rd	1874–1878	Théodore Robitaille	Conservative
4th	1878–1879	Théodore Robitaille	Conservative
4th	1879–1882	Pierre-Clovis Beauchesne	Conservative
5th	1882–1887	Louis-Joseph Riopel	Conservative
6th	1887–1891	Louis-Joseph Riopel	Conservative
7th	1891–1896	William Le Boutillier Fauvel	Liberal
8th	1896–1897	William Le Boutillier Fauvel	Liberal
8th	1897–1900	Jean-François Guité	Liberal
9th	1900–1904	Charles Marcil	Liberal
10th	1904–1908	Charles Marcil	Liberal
11th	1908–1911	Charles Marcil	Liberal
12th	1911–1917	Charles Marcil	Liberal
13th	1917–1921	Charles Marcil	Opposition (Laurier Liberals)
14th	1921–1925	Charles Marcil	Liberal
15th	1925–1926	Charles Marcil	Liberal
16th	1926–1930	Charles Marcil	Liberal
17th	1930–1935	Charles Marcil	Liberal
18th	1935–1937	Charles Marcil	Liberal
18th	1937–1940	Pierre-Émile Côté	Liberal
19th	1940–1945	Alphée Poirier	Liberal
20th	1945–1949	Bona Arsenault	Independent
21st	1949–1953	Bona Arsenault	Liberal
22nd	1953–1957	Bona Arsenault	Liberal
23rd	1957–1958	Nérée Arsenault	Progressive Conservative
24th	1958–1962	Lucien Grenier	Progressive Conservative
25th	1962–1963	Albert Béchard	Liberal
26th	1963–1965	Albert Béchard	Liberal
27th	1965–1968	Albert Béchard	Liberal
28th	1968–1972	Albert Béchard	Liberal
Bonaventure—Îles-de-la-Madeleine
29th	1972–1974	Albert Béchard	Liberal
30th	1974–1979	Albert Béchard	Liberal
31st	1979–1980	Rémi Bujold	Liberal
32nd	1980–1984	Rémi Bujold	Liberal
33rd	1984–1988	Darryl Gray	Progressive Conservative
34th	1988–1993	Darryl Gray	Progressive Conservative
35th	1993–1997	Patrick Gagnon	Liberal
Riding dissolved into Gaspé—Bonaventure—Îles-de-la-Madeleine

== Election results ==
=== Bonaventure ===
1867 Canadian federal election
Party	Candidate	Votes
Conservative	Théodore Robitaille	1,018
Unknown	M. Tremblay	444
Eligible voters		1,878
Source: Canadian Parliamentary Guide, 1871

1872 Canadian federal election
Party	Candidate	Votes
Conservative	Théodore Robitaille	999
Unknown	J.R. Hamilton	232
Unknown	A. Verge	2

By-election on 15 February 1873 On Mr. Robitaille's appointment as Receiver-General, 30 January 1873
Party	Candidate	Votes
Conservative	Théodore Robitaille	acclaimed

1874 Canadian federal election
Party	Candidate	Votes
Conservative	Théodore Robitaille	1,063
Unknown	M. Tremblay	742

1878 Canadian federal election
Party	Candidate	Votes
Conservative	Théodore Robitaille	1,014
Unknown	W.H. Clapperton	825

By-election on 26 August 1879 Robitaille appointed Lieutenant Governor of Quebec, 26 July 1879
Party	Candidate	Votes
Conservative	Pierre-Clovis Beauchesne	acclaimed

1882 Canadian federal election
Party	Candidate	Votes
Conservative	Louis-Joseph Riopel	acclaimed

1887 Canadian federal election
Party	Candidate	Votes
Conservative	Louis-Joseph Riopel	1,352
Liberal	George Pierre Roy	994

1891 Canadian federal election
Party	Candidate	Votes
Liberal	William LeBoutillier Fauvel	1,707
Conservative	A.A. Laferriere	1,003

1896 Canadian federal election
Party	Candidate	Votes
Liberal	William LeBoutillier Fauvel	1,644
Conservative	George P. Roy	1,331

By-election on 17 March 1897 Fauvel's death, 8 February 1897
Party	Candidate	Votes
Liberal	Jean-François Guité	1,908
Conservative	Charles Cyr	1,116

1900 Canadian federal election
Party	Candidate	Votes
Liberal	Charles Marcil	1,567
Conservative	Jean Baptiste Belanger	1,418

1904 Canadian federal election
Party	Candidate	Votes
Liberal	Charles Marcil	2,280
Conservative	Thomas Crockett	1,388

1908 Canadian federal election
Party	Candidate	Votes
Liberal	Charles Marcil	2,408
Conservative	Arthur Beauchesne	1,146

1911 Canadian federal election
Party	Candidate	Votes
Liberal	Charles Marcil	2,444
Conservative	Joseph-Alfred Mousseau	1,395

1917 Canadian federal election
Party	Candidate	Votes
Opposition (Laurier Liberals)	Charles Marcil	4,131
Government (Unionist)	Philippe Furois	1,236

1921 Canadian federal election
Party	Candidate	Votes
Liberal	Charles Marcil	6,136
Conservative	Thomas Robert Busteed	1,599

1925 Canadian federal election
Party	Candidate	Votes
Liberal	Charles Marcil	4,344
Conservative	Etienne Théodore Paquet	3,815

1926 Canadian federal election
Party	Candidate	Votes
Liberal	Charles Marcil	6,164
Conservative	Eugene Paquet	5,155

1930 Canadian federal election
Party	Candidate	Votes
Liberal	Charles Marcil	5,894
Conservative	Edward Andrew D. Morgan	5,848

1935 Canadian federal election
Party	Candidate	Votes
Liberal	Charles Marcil	8,498
Conservative	James Joseph Jessop	5,935

By-election on 22 March 1937 Marcil's death, 29 January 1937
Party	Candidate	Votes
Liberal	Pierre-Emile Cote	7,735
Conservative	William O'Donnell	6,076
Independent	Maurice Thibault	225

1940 Canadian federal election
Party	Candidate	Votes
Liberal	J.-Alphée Poirier	9,446
National Government	Bona Arsenault	5,741

1945 Canadian federal election
Party	Candidate	Votes
Independent	Bona Arsenault	7,885
Liberal	John C. Gilker	6,605
Progressive Conservative	Alexander Pratt	1,046

1949 Canadian federal election
Party	Candidate	Votes
Liberal	Bona Arsenault	9,802
Progressive Conservative	Edouard Dion	6,776
Independent Liberal	Bertrand Tremblay	437

1953 Canadian federal election
Party	Candidate	Votes
Liberal	Bona Arsenault	9,177
Progressive Conservative	Jean-Augustin Goulet	6,446

1957 Canadian federal election
Party	Candidate	Votes
Progressive Conservative	Nérée Arsenault	8,161
Liberal	Bona Arsenault	7,903

1958 Canadian federal election
Party	Candidate	Votes
Progressive Conservative	Lucien Grenier	9,135
Liberal	André Dube	7,741

1962 Canadian federal election
Party	Candidate	Votes
Liberal	Albert Béchard	7,559
Progressive Conservative	Lucien Grenier	6,286
Social Credit	Conrad-V. Audet	3,025

1963 Canadian federal election
Party	Candidate	Votes
Liberal	Albert Béchard	9,092
Social Credit	J.-O-Gérard Bernard	4,302
Progressive Conservative	Lucien Grenier	2,785

1965 Canadian federal election
Party	Candidate	Votes
Liberal	Albert Béchard	8,985
Progressive Conservative	AURÈLE	6,236
Ralliement créditiste	Gérard Audet	733
New Democratic	Marc Boulard	251

1968 Canadian federal election
Party	Candidate	Votes
Liberal	Albert Béchard	10,144
Ralliement créditiste	Gérard Audet	4,240
Progressive Conservative	Robert Bourdages	3,674
Independent	Henri Chapados	680
New Democratic	Bernard Martin	282

=== Bonaventure—Îles-de-la-Madeleine ===
1972 Canadian federal election
Party	Candidate	Votes
Liberal	Albert Béchard	12,213
Progressive Conservative	Gérard-Raymond Blais	5,108
Social Credit	Gérard Audet	4,842
New Democratic	Huguette-L. Gauthier	480

1974 Canadian federal election
Party	Candidate	Votes
Liberal	Albert Béchard	12,977
Progressive Conservative	Gérard-Raymond Blais	6,884
New Democratic	Huguette-L. Gauthier	1,313

1979 Canadian federal election
Party	Candidate	Votes
Liberal	Rémi Bujold	15,777
Progressive Conservative	Gilbert Carbonneau	11,641
New Democratic	Huguette Gauthier	1,514

1980 Canadian federal election
Party	Candidate	Votes
Liberal	Rémi Bujold	19,193
Progressive Conservative	Marie Josée Pinard	5,063
New Democratic	John Foran	1,568
Rhinoceros	Louis Philippe Tulip Leblanc	917
Social Credit	Gérard Bernard	528
Rhinoceros	Jacques Simard	391

1984 Canadian federal election
Party	Candidate	Votes
Progressive Conservative	Darryl Gray	15,502
Liberal	Rémi Bujold	13,689
New Democratic	Martin Cauvier	1,040
Independent	Sylvain Sauvé	440
Commonwealth of Canada	Jacques Bernier	280

1988 Canadian federal election
Party	Candidate	Votes
Progressive Conservative	Darryl Gray	15,491
Liberal	Lyse Routhier	9,296
New Democratic	Germaine Poirier	1,546

1993 Canadian federal election
Party	Candidate	Votes
Liberal	Patrick Gagnon	12,334
Bloc Québécois	Michel Saint-Pierre	9,228
Progressive Conservative	Darryl L. Gray	6,019
New Democratic	Germaine Poirier	377

== See also ==
- List of Canadian electoral districts
- Historical federal electoral districts of Canada
