= St John, Jersey =

Parish in northern Jersey

Coordinates: 49.2450°N 2.1359°W

St John Saint-Jean (French)
- Jersey parish
- Parish of St John
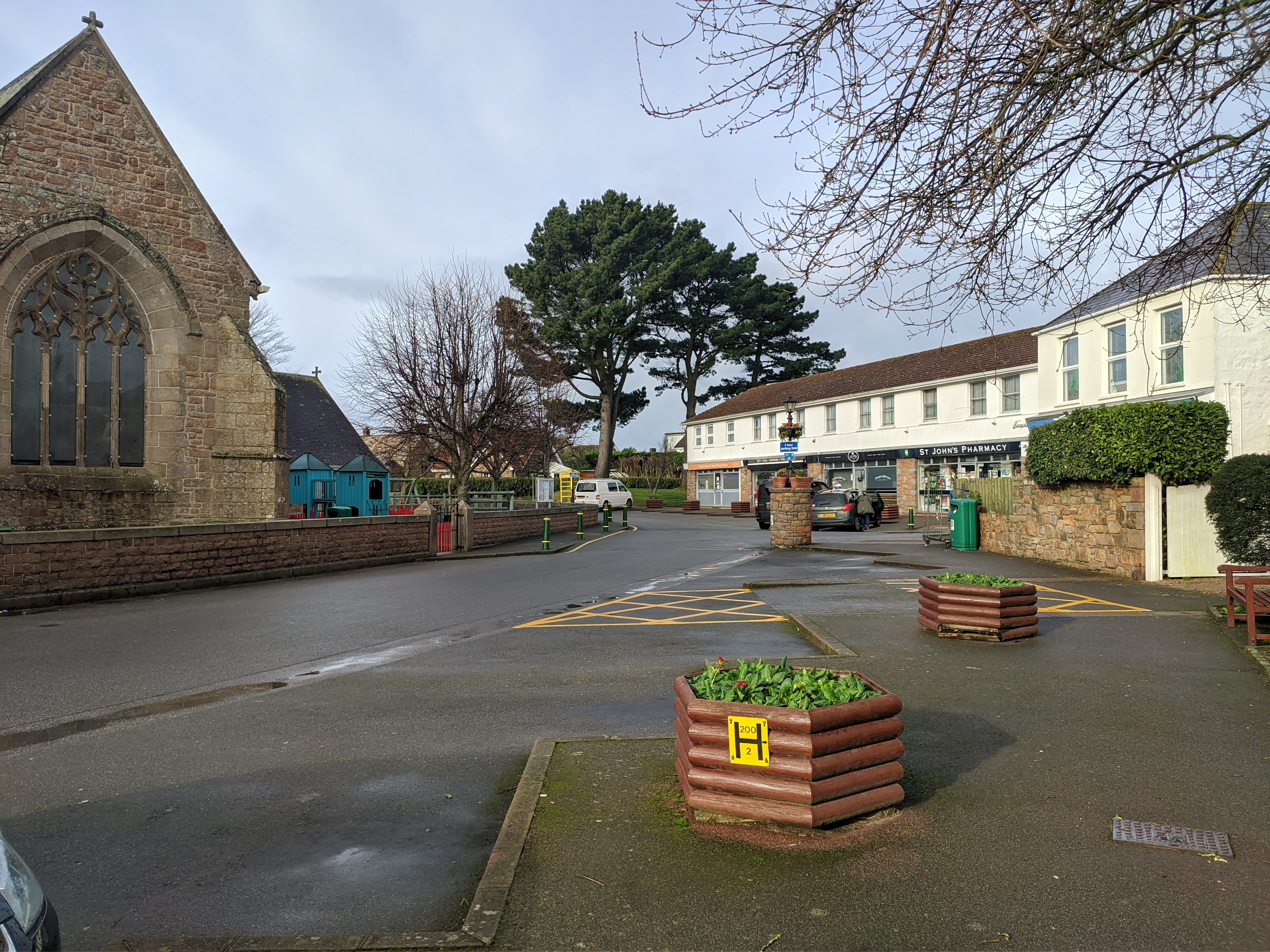
- Village precinct

- Flag Coat of arms

- Location of Saint John in Jersey
- Crown Dependency: Jersey, Channel Islands
- Headquarters: Parish Hall, La Rue de la Mare Ballam

Government
  - Connétable: Andy Jehan
  - Rector: Beverley Sproats

Area
  - Total: 8.7 km^{2} (3.4 sq mi)
  - Rank: Ranked 9th

Population (2021)
  - Total: 3,051
  - Density: 350/km^{2} (910/sq mi)
- Time zone: GMT
  - Summer (DST): UTC+01
- Postcode district: JE3
- Postcode sector: 4
- Website: stjohn.je

St John (Jèrriais and French: Saint-Jean) is one of the twelve parishes of Jersey and is around 7.3 kilometres (4.5 mi) (Note: Measured from the Parish Hall to the Royal Square) north of St Helier on the north coast of the island. It has a surface area of 8.7 km2. St John's Village is also the name of the main village in the parish.

The parish is largely rural, with two main settlements: its namesake village and the village of Sion on the border with St Helier.

== History ==
The parish sources its name from its parish church, dedicated to John the Baptist.

The Jersey parish system has been in place for centuries. By Norman times, the parish boundaries were firmly fixed and remain largely unchanged since.

In 1180 Jersey was divided by the Normans into three ministeria for administrative purposes. St John was part of de Groceio. De Groceio likely refers to the Jersey family name, de Gruchy.

In 1706, there was a dispute in the St John's parish church over the distribution of pews. The island had strict protocol in distribution and tenancy of pews. In 1706, Jean Le Couteur enlarged his own family's pew, which obstructed Josué Ahier's view. This started a large dispute. Ahier complained to the Ecclesiastical Court, which ordered Le Couteur to remove the obstruction. Le Couteur then complained to the Royal Court, which ordered Ahier to cease disturbing him. Ahier complained to the Dean, who excommunicated Le Couteur from all the churches under his purview. The Royal Court then forbade this and fined any rectors who carried out the command.

La Route du Nord was constructed during the German occupation of the Channel Islands as a scheme to provide work. The road is now dedicated to the men and women of Jersey who suffered 1939–1945.

In 2019, the parish's Connétable Chris Taylor drove his car at an off-duty police officer on a road in neighbouring Trinity. He was fined £4000 and given a driving suspension for 18 months. He then tried to use parish money to pay the legal fees, claiming it would be paid by the parish insurance. On 18 March 2021, Chris Taylor resigned having been declared 'unfit for office' by the Royal Court. However, he remained as Connétable until his successor, Andy Jehan, was elected unopposed on 31 March 2021.

== Governance ==
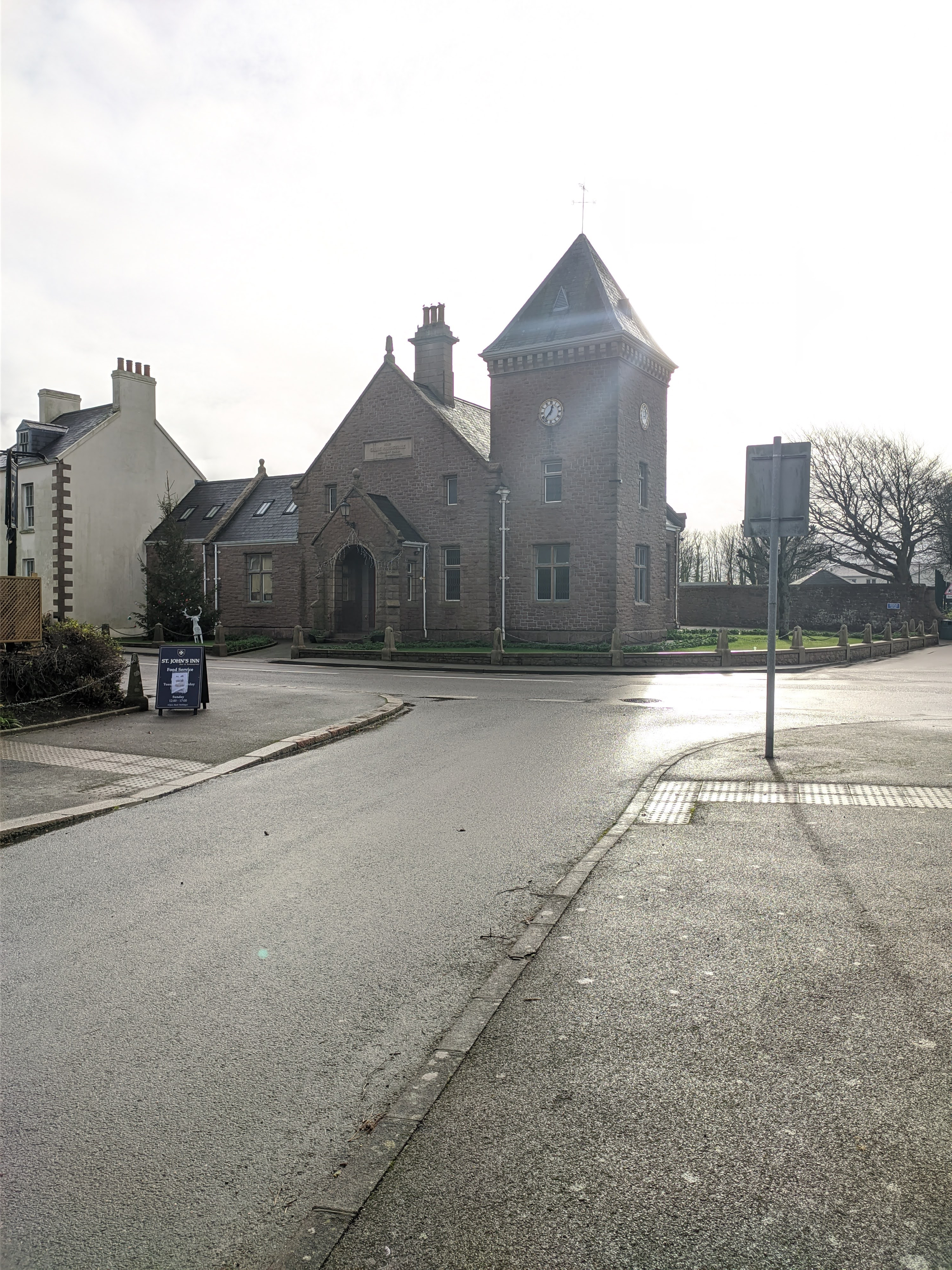
Parish hall of St John

The parish is a first-level administrative division of the Bailiwick of Jersey, a British Crown dependency. The highest official in the parish is the Connétable of St John. The incumbent office holder is Andy Jehan, who has held the office since 2021. The parish administration is headquartered at the Parish Hall next to the parish church.

At present, the parish forms one electoral district for States Assembly elections and elects one Deputy, as well as eight Senators in an islandwide constituency. The current Deputy for St John is Trevor Pointon. Under the proposed electoral reform, it will form part of the Central electoral district consisting of St John, St Lawrence and Trinity, which will collectively elect four representatives alongside the parishes' Connétables.

The parish is divided into vingtaines for administrative purposes as follows:

Official name	Jèrriais translation	English translation
Vingtaine du Nord	Vîngtaine du Nord	North Vingtaine
Vingtaine de Hérupe	Vîngtaine dé Hérupe	Herupe Vingtaine
Vingtaine du Douet	Vîngtaine du Dou	Stream Vingtaine

== Geography ==
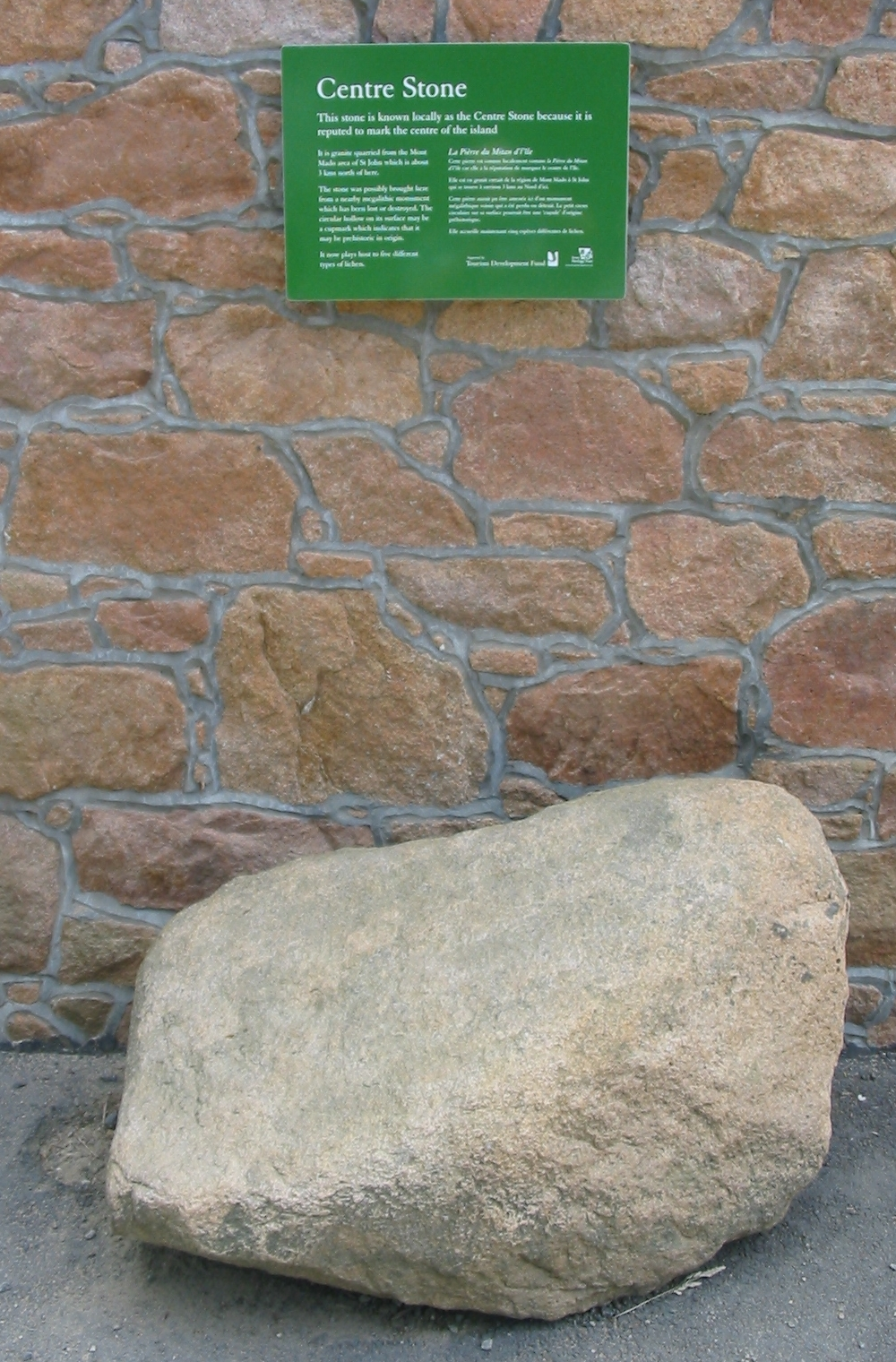
The Centre Stone at Sion in St John is traditionally regarded as the centre of the Island although it is far from the geographic centre by modern calculations. The stone is prehistoric, showing evidence of cup marks, and may have been brought from a nearby dolmen now vanished

St John shares borders with St Mary on its west, Trinity to the east, and St Lawrence and St Helier on its south.

Largely a rural community, the namesake has a small shopping precinct, and village pub, around its parish church, with the primary school and parish hall across the main road. There is also a supermarket and recreation centre to the east of the village.

There is also a second village of Sion in the Southwestern panhandle of the parish. This is quite a small village centred around the main road. It has a small shop and a garage.

The cliffs of the north coast afford some of the best views in Jersey. It features a number of key points on the island's coast including Frémont Point, Sorel Point and Ronez Point.

After Trinity, it has the second highest point in Jersey at Mont Mado (473 ft). The parish covers territory of 4,846 vergées (8.7 km^{2}.).

There is a single usable beach in the parish at the Bonne Nuit harbour, accessible by a hilly windy road that connects to the village.

The Mont Mado hamlet and wider area is found to the east of St John's village. The name derives from the Fief Madoc and ultimately the Welsh Prince Madoc. Its link to St John however is unknown. Mont Mado granite was quarried historically. The largest quarry is now that of Ronez on the north coast.

Coat of arms of St John, Jersey.

== Demography ==
St John is the second least populated parish of Jersey, having only 2,911 residents as of 2011.

Historical population
Year	Pop.	±%
1991	2,440	—
1996	2,520	+3.3%
2001	2,618	+3.9%
2011	2,911	+11.2%

== Landmarks ==
Historically, in the Mont Mado area, there was a priory known as the Chapel of St Blaize and St Marguerite. It gives its name to the nearby lane La Rue de St Blaize. The chapel then gives its name on to two further place names: La Rue ès Nonnes and La Couochette ès Nonnes (a cliff face to the north of La Rue ès Nonnes) which means the resting place of the nuns.

=== Places of worship ===
The parish church is dedicated to St John the Baptist and the symbol for St John has links to the Crusades - the Maltese cross is used within Jersey to depict the Parish of St John. The full name of the church is Saint-Jean des Chênes (English: St. John of the Oaks; Latin: Sanctus Johannes de Caisnibus). It possibly first stood in an oak-wood. The church is known to have existed as early as 1150.

There a number of other churches such as the Sion Methodist Chapel (no longer in operation, now housing).

== Transport ==
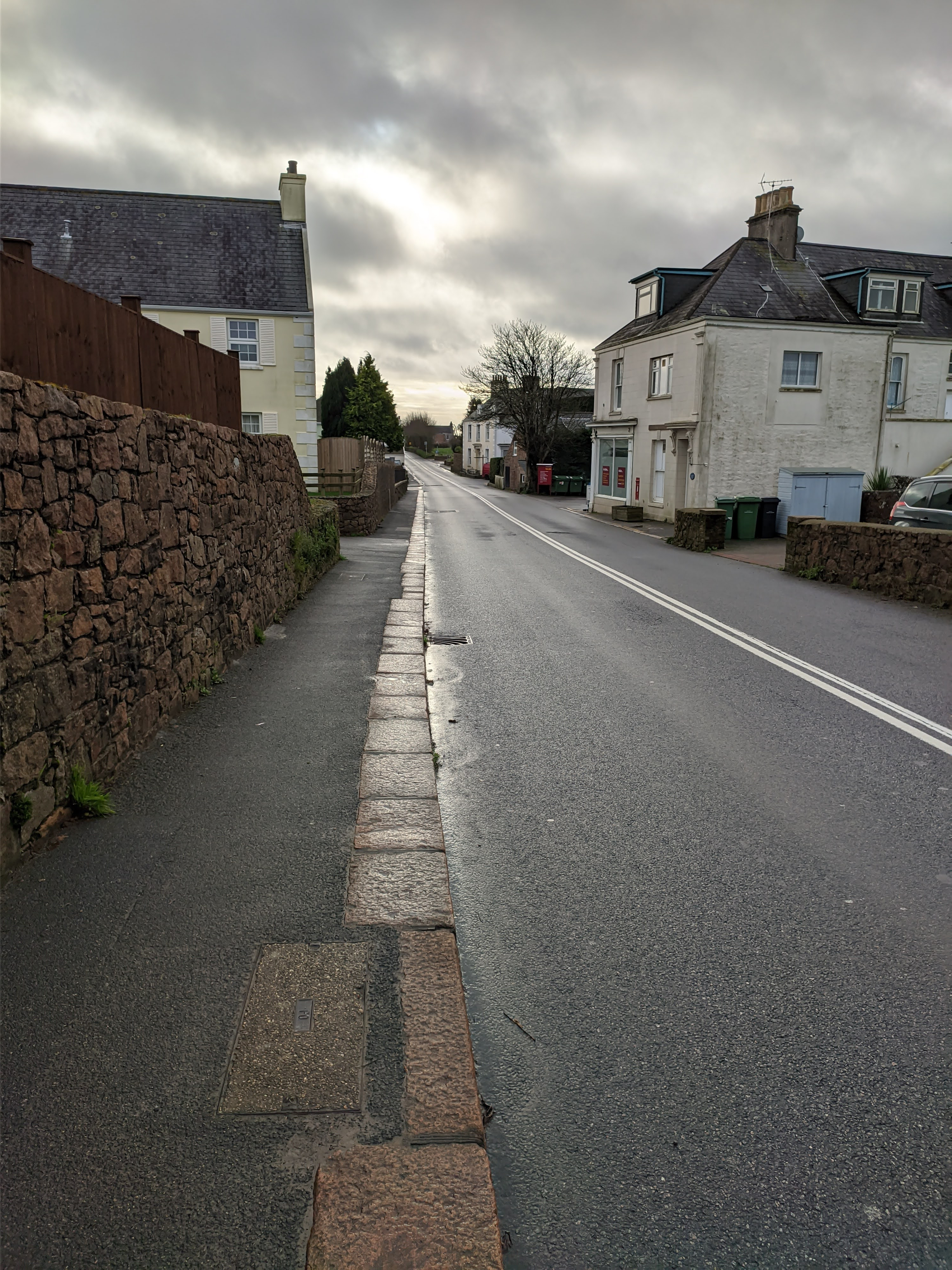
Sion village in the south of the parish

The main road for the parish is the A9, which runs from the parish church and connects the main settlements (Hautes Croix and Sion) of the parish before running along a lightly developed road to the town. It connects all the way to the waterfront. Other main link roads include the A8 which runs to Trinity, the B33 which continues on from the A9 and runs eastward to St Mary and the A10 which starts in the south of the village and runs down towards St Lawrence. The parish is served by three bus routes that connect the parish to St Mary, St Lawrence, Trinity and St Helier.

== Culture ==
St John's Day is 24 June. Traditionally on 23 June (St John's Eve), there used to be a custom of faire braire les poêles, a form of music-making using brass boilers and rushes. This tradition was observed in other parishes as well. Les Cornes de St Jean was observed on either 23 or 24 June whereby shells or horns were blown just before sunset to remind tenants to pay the rental for their land (payable at midsummer). On St John's Day it was custom for young people to drink milk punch on St John's Day. Until 1797, there was a fair in St John involving dancing, but this was banned by an Act of the States. On St John's Day, northern fishermen would circumnavigate the rock known as Le Cheval Guillaume and light bonfires and indulge in Bacchanalian dances.

=== Twinning ===
St John is twinned with:

- (France) Le Teilleul, Normandy

== Gallery ==
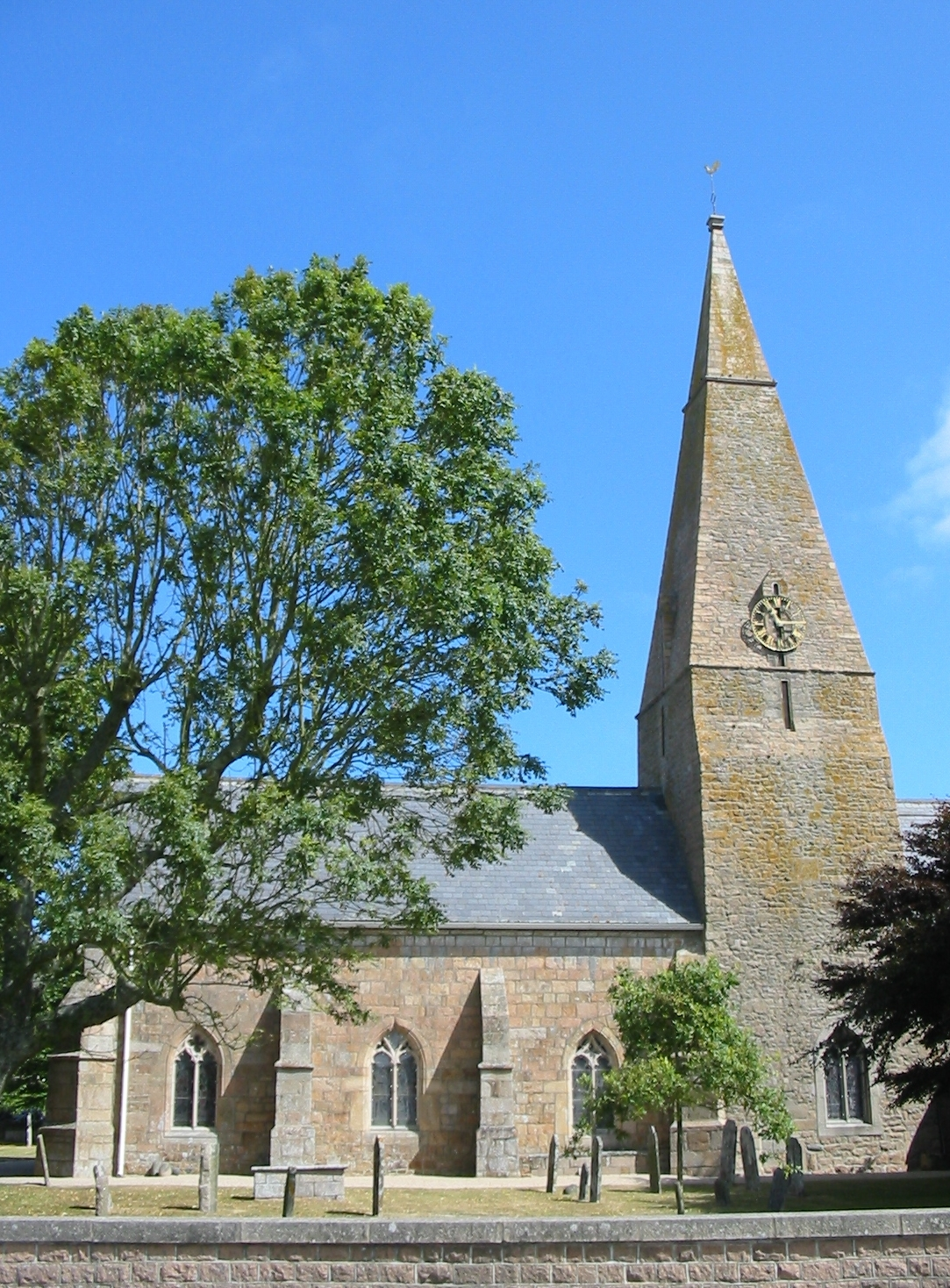
Parish church

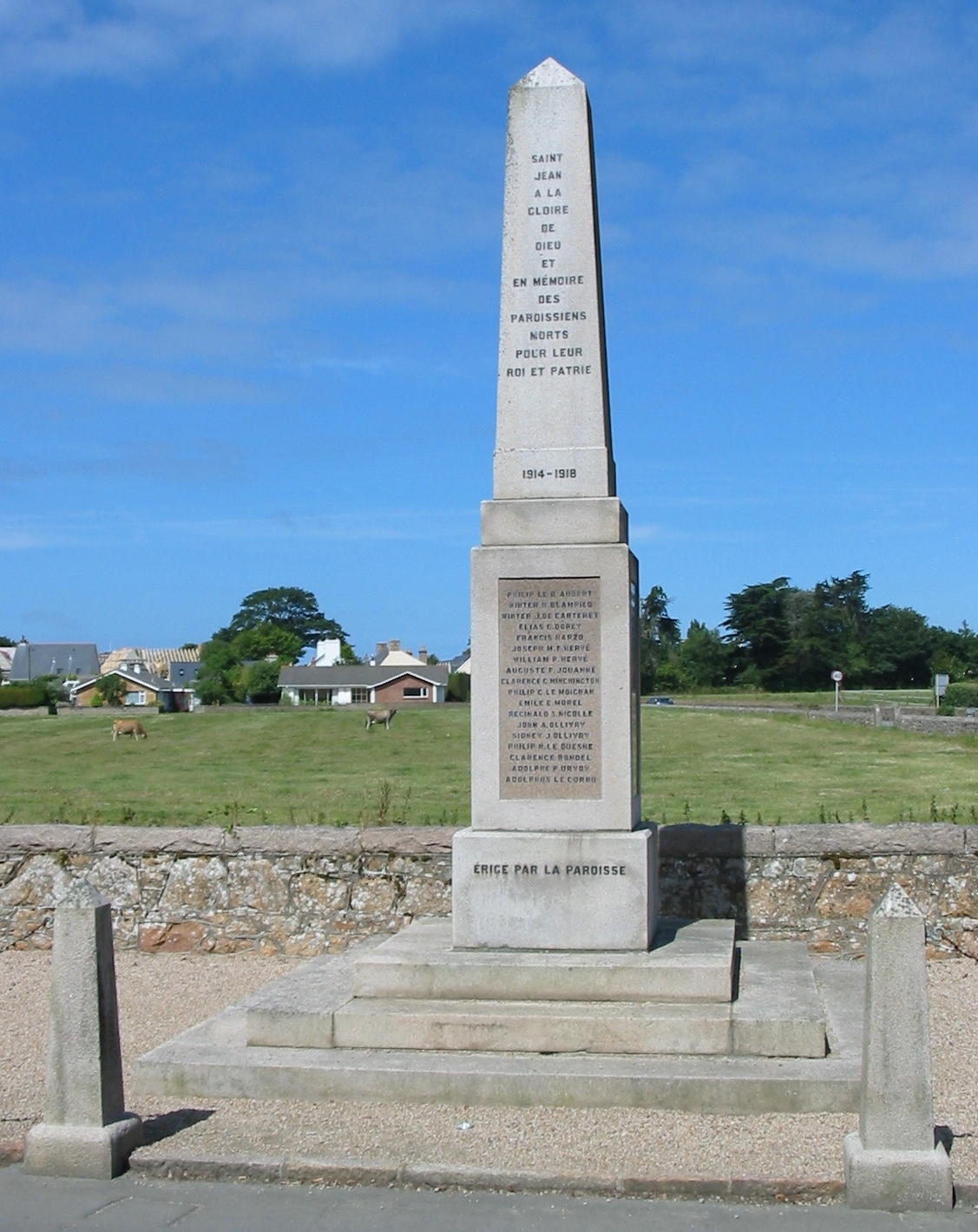
War memorial

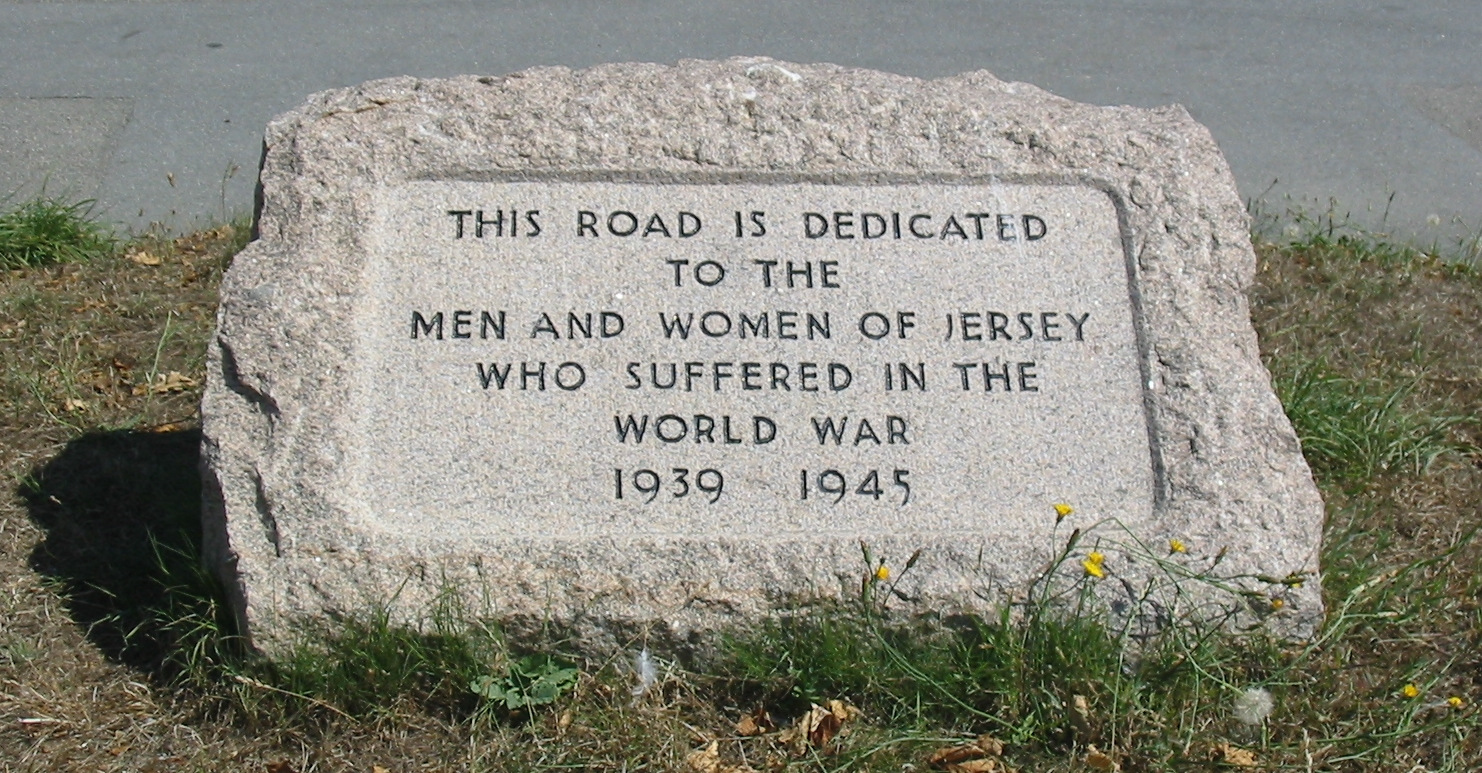
La Route du Nord dedication stone
