= Nérée Arsenault =

Canadian politician

Member of Parliament for Bonaventure
- In office 1957–1958

Personal details
- Born: 28 August 1911 Bonaventure, Quebec, Canada
- Died: 18 January 1982 (aged 70) Lotbinière, Quebec, Canada
- Party: Progressive Conservative
- Profession: Forest engineer

Nérée Arsenault (28 August 1911 – 18 January 1982) was a Canadian politician and forest engineer. In the 1957 federal election, he was elected to the House of Commons of Canada in the riding of Bonaventure representing the Progressive Conservative Party. He did not stand for the next election in 1958.
