= Lucien Grenier (politician) =

Canadian politician

Lucien Grenier (October 11, 1925 – August 3, 1998) was a lawyer and political figure in Quebec, Canada. He represented Bonaventure in the House of Commons of Canada from 1958 to 1962 as a Progressive Conservative.

He was born in Saint-Godefroi, Quebec, the son of Simon Grenier and Marie-G. Hirard, and was educated at the Séminaire de Gaspé. Grenier practised law at New Carlisle, Quebec. He was an unsuccessful candidate for a seat in the Quebec assembly in 1948. In 1949, he married Pierrette Demers. Grenier was defeated when he ran for reelection to the House of Commons in 1962 and 1963.
