= Louis-Joseph Riopel =

Canadian politician

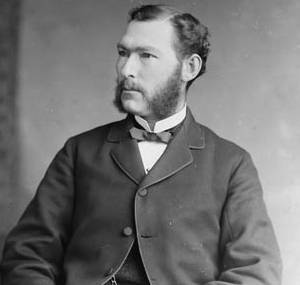
Louis-Joseph Riopel Source: Library and Archives Canada

Louis-Joseph Riopel (September 16, 1841 – May 11, 1915) was a lawyer, notary and political figure in Quebec. He represented Bonaventure in the Legislative Assembly of Quebec from 1881 to 1882 and Bonaventure in the House of Commons of Canada from 1882 to 1891 as a Conservative member.

He was born in St-Jacques-L'Achigan, Canada East, the son of Louis Riopel and Julie Mercure. Riopel was educated at the Collège de l'Assomption, then articled as a notary with Louis Archambeault, was qualified to practice in 1865 and set up practice in New Carlisle. In 1875, he married Marie Louise Justine Robitaille, the daughter of a notary. Riopel served as Superintendent of Colonization and Public Works for Bonaventure County from 1869 to 1873 and then crown lands agent from 1873 to 1880. He went on to study law at the Université Laval and was admitted to the Quebec bar in 1880. Riopel resigned his seat in the Quebec assembly in 1882 to run for a seat in the House of Commons. He retired from politics in 1891. Riopel was a director of the North West Central Railway and one of the promoters of the Baie-des-Chaleurs Railway. He died in New Carlisle at the age of 73.
