= Zec de la Rivière-Nouvelle =

- Location within Quebec
- Location: Canada, Quebec, Avignon Regional County Municipality
- Coordinates: 48°18′07″N 66°30′56″W
- Area: 86.2 square kilometres (33.3 sq mi)
- Established: 1997
- Governing body: Société de Restauration et de Gestion de la Nouvelle inc.

The Zec de la Rivière-Nouvelle (River Nova) is a "zone d'exploitation contrôlée" (controlled harvesting zone) (zec) in the unorganized territory of Rivière-Nouvelle, in Avignon Regional County Municipality, in the administrative region Gaspésie-Îles-de-la-Madeleine, in Quebec, in Canada. The main purpose of the ZEC is the management of salmon fishing.

== Geography ==
Located on the north bank of the Chaleur Bay, in Gaspésie, the "Zec de la Rivière-Nouvelle" is surrounded by mountains, offering impressive views.

The zec is located along the Nouvelle River whose waters are reputed highly crystalline. This river of 76 kilometres (47 mi) flows south. It originates from the high peaks in the Notre Dame Mountains, in Chic-Choc Mountains to finish the course in the Chaleur Bay, in the municipality of Nouvelle.

Visitors access to the municipality of Nouvelle through the route 132 that bypasses the Gaspe Peninsula and through the Matapedia Valley. The entrance station of the zec is located in the heart of the city of Nouvelle, at the intersection of Highway Miguasha.

A serviced camping is built beside the entrance station of zec. A convenience store with gas station and a grocery store is within walking distance of the campsite. Zec offers a hosting service in comfortable cottages near the Rivière-Nouvelle.

== Salmon fishing ==
Zec is renowned for recreative fishing for Atlantic salmon. A traffic sign clearly identifies salmon pits which are easily accessible by car up near the water pits. Some pits requires walking distance on real trails.

ZEC has six fishing areas on nearly 80 kilometres (50 mi) of river. One of these sectors is limited enrollment to six anglers per day. In other sectors, there is no limit fishing day.

Generally, as the season progresses, the fishing is successful because the water of the Nouvelle River remains cold and well oxygenated throughout the season. Except in case of flash flood, water from the Nouvelle River maintains an exceptional clarity.

== Toponymy ==
The toponym "Zec de la Rivière-Nouvelle" was officialized on December 12, 1997 at the Bank of places names of Commission de toponymie du Québec (Geographical Names Board of Quebec).

== See also ==
=== Related articles ===
- Gaspésie
- Chaleur Bay (Baie des Chaleurs)
- Chic-Choc Mountains
- Rivière-Nouvelle, unorganized territory
- Nouvelle River, river emptying in Chaleur Bay (Baie des Chaleurs)
- Nouvelle, municipality of Chaleur Bay (Baie des Chaleurs), in Gaspésie
- Zone d'exploitation contrôlée (controlled harvesting zone) (zec)
