= Escuminac =

Escuminac may refer to:

== Places in New Brunswick, Canada ==
- Escuminac, New Brunswick, a rural community
  - 1959 Escuminac disaster
- Point Escuminac, a cape at the mouth of St. Lawrence River, in the Northumberland Strait

== Places in Quebec, Canada ==
- Escuminac, Quebec, a municipality
- Escuminac River, Quebec
- Escuminac Formation, a geologic formation
