= Saint-François-d'Assise, Quebec =

Saint-François-d'Assise
- Municipality
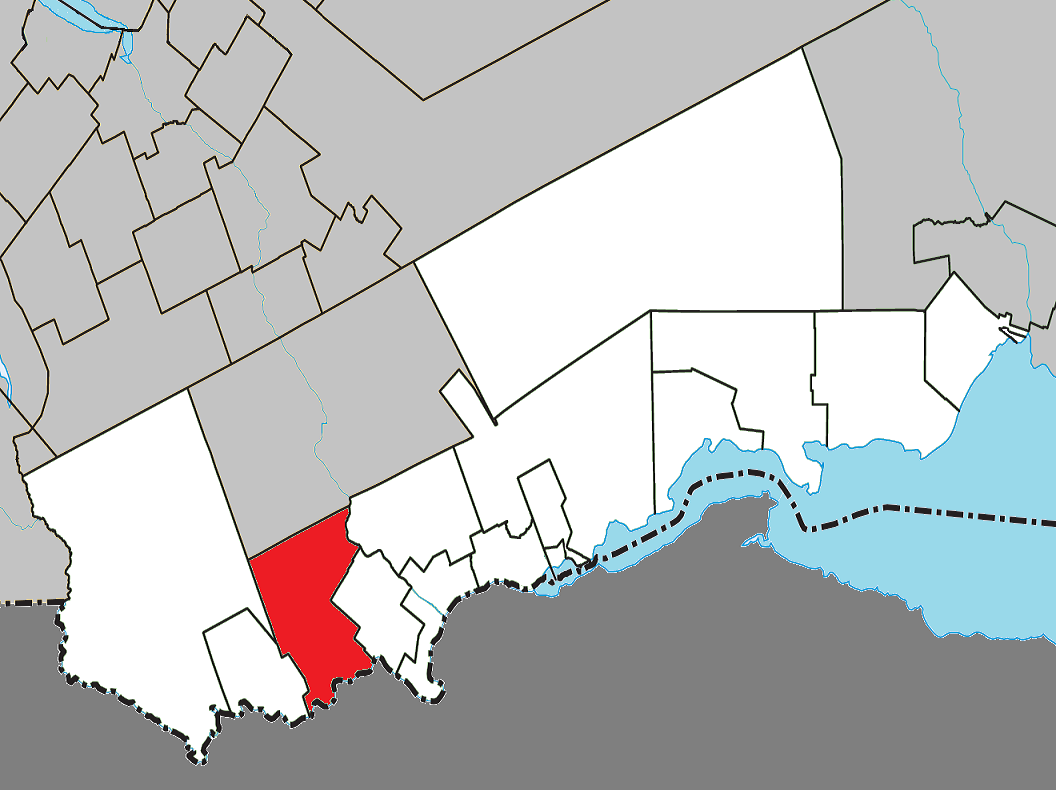
- Location within Avignon RCM

- Location in eastern Quebec
- Coordinates: 47°59′N 67°10′W
- Country: Canada
- Province: Quebec
- Region: Gaspésie– Îles-de-la-Madeleine
- RCM: Avignon
- Constituted: September 3, 1926

Government
  - Mayor: Rémi Lagacé
  - Federal riding: Gaspésie—Les Îles-de-la-Madeleine—Listuguj
  - Prov. riding: Bonaventure

Area
  - Total: 179.75 km^{2} (69.40 sq mi)
  - Land: 179.34 km^{2} (69.24 sq mi)

Population (2021)
  - Total: 679
  - Density: 3.8/km^{2} (9.8/sq mi)
  - Pop (2016-21): ▲5.4%
  - Dwellings: 367
- Time zone: UTC−5 (EST)
  - Summer (DST): UTC−4 (EDT)
- Postal code(s): G0J 2N0
- Area codes: 418 and 581
- Highways: No major routes
- Website: www.matapedia lesplateaux.com

Saint-François-d'Assise (French pronunciation: [sɛ̃ fʁɑ̃swa dasiz]) is a municipality in Quebec, Canada.

In addition to Saint-François-d'Assise itself, the municipality also includes the communities of L'Immaculée-Conception, Saint-Jean-de-Matapédia, and Saint-Joseph-de-Matapédia.

== History ==
In 1887, the mission of Saint-Joseph was established, that was in the jurisdiction of the Parish of Saint-Alexis-de-Matapédia. It was renamed to Saint-François-d'Assise or Saint-François-de-Matapédia in 1889 by Joseph-Elzéar Pelletier, priest of Saint-Alexis-de-Matapédia, after François Cinq-Mars (1847-1902), who served as priest at the mission from 1890 to 1892, while also honouring Francis of Assisi.

In 1900, its post office opened, and in 1924, the parish was formed. In 1926, the Parish Municipality of Saint-François-d'Assise was created when it split off from the Parish Municipality of Saint-Alexis-de-Matapédia. In 1968, it lost part of its territory when the Municipality of L'Ascension-de-Patapédia was created.

In 2003, the parish municipality changed statutes to become a regular municipality.

== Demographics ==
Canada census – Saint-François-d'Assise community profile

| | 2021 | 2016 | 2011 |
| Population | 679 (+5.4% from 2016) | 644 (-8.8% from 2011) | 706 (-5.0% from 2006) |
| Land area | 179.34 km^{2} (69.24 sq mi) | 178.56 km^{2} (68.94 sq mi) | 178.12 km^{2} (68.77 sq mi) |
| Population density | 3.8/km^{2} (9.8/sq mi) | 3.6/km^{2} (9.3/sq mi) | 4.0/km^{2} (10/sq mi) |
| Median age | 61.2 (M: 60.4, F: 62) | 56.8 (M: 56.8, F: 56.8) | 52.1 (M: 51.6, F: 52.6) |
| Private dwellings | 367 (total) 323 (occupied) | 360 (total) 304 (occupied) | 353 (total) |
| Median household income | $52,000 | $43,776 | $42,085 |

References: 2021 2016 2011

Historical Census Data - Saint-François-d'Assise, Quebec

| Year | Pop. | ±% |
|---|---|---|
| 1931 | 891 | — |
| 1941 | 1,268 | +42.3% |
| 1951 | 1,334 | +5.2% |
| 1956 | 1,551 | +16.3% |
| 1961 | 1,490 | −3.9% |
| 1966 | 1,454 | −2.4% |

| Year | Pop. | ±% |
|---|---|---|
| 1971 | 1,118 | −23.1% |
| 1976 | 979 | −12.4% |
| 1981 | 904 | −7.7% |
| 1986 | 942 | +4.2% |
| 1991 | 883 | −6.3% |
| 1996 | 897 | +1.6% |

| Year | Pop. | ±% |
|---|---|---|
| 2001 | 807 | −10.0% |
| 2006 | 743 | −7.9% |
| 2011 | 706 | −5.0% |
| 2016 | 644 | −8.8% |
| 2021 | 679 | +5.4% |

Population counts are not adjusted for boundary changes.
Source: Statistics Canada

== Government ==
List of former mayors:

- Hermel Gallant (...–2005)
- Ghislain Michaud (2005–2023)
- Rémi Lagacé (2023–present)

== See also ==
- List of municipalities in Quebec
