= Patapédia =

Patapédia may refer to:

- L'Ascension-de-Patapédia, Quebec, a municipality of Gaspésie, in Gaspésie-Îles-de-la-Madeleine administrative region
- Patapédia River, a river of Gaspésie
- Patapédia (township), township of Gaspésie
