= Escuminac River =

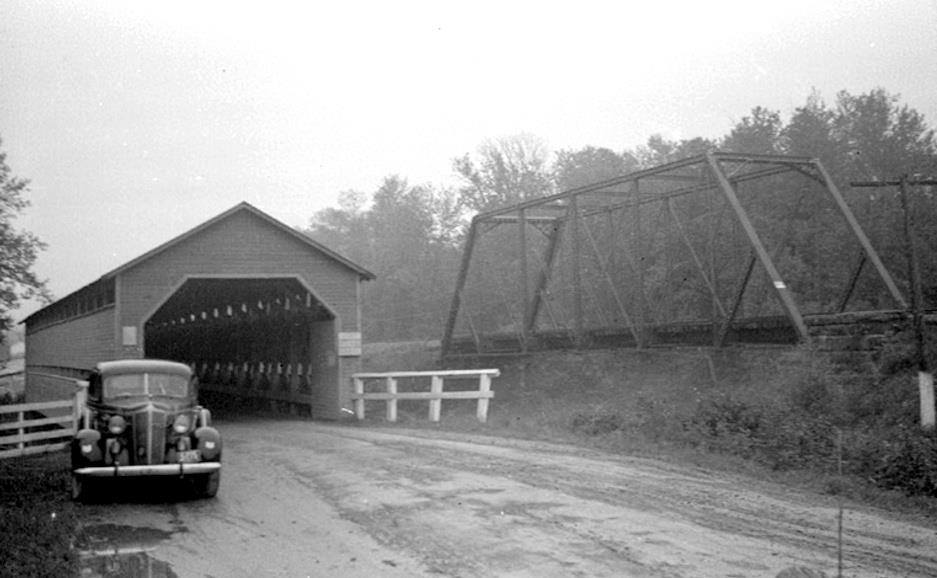

Location
- Country: Canada
- State: Quebec
- City: Escuminac

Physical characteristics
- Source
  - location: Mountain streams in the Notre Dame Mountains, Rivière-Nouvelle, Quebec (unorganized territory), (Fauvel (township)), Quebec
  - coordinates: 48°19′42″N 66°46′24″W
  - elevation: 515 m (1,690 ft)
- Mouth
  - location: Escuminac, Quebec, Quebec
  - coordinates: 48°07′23″N 66°28′08″W
  - elevation: 0 m (0 ft)
- Length: 44.6 km (27.7 mi)

Basin features
- Tributaries
  - left: (from the confluence) Edward Creek Campbell Creek, Carmichael stream, creek La Garde, Escuminac North River (Quebec), Burnt Land Brook, Falls Creek, Tilt stream, Rachel creek.
  - right: (from the confluence) Harper Creek, Dawson Creek, Quinn ravine, Hells ravine, Big Creek, ravine of Riviere du Loup, Patricia stream.

The River Escuminac flows through the regional county municipality (MRC) of Avignon Regional County Municipality, in the administrative region of Gaspésie-Îles-de-la-Madeleine, in Quebec, in Canada. The Escuminac River crosses the municipal territories of:

- Rivière-Nouvelle, Quebec, an unorganized territory: Fauvel (township) and Vallée (township);
- Pointe-à-la-Croix, Quebec, a municipality: Mann (township);
- Escuminac, Quebec, a municipality of Nouvelle (township).

Over the last five kilometers of its course, the little valley of the Escuminac River widens, forming a green plain, where agriculture was practiced by the first inhabitants of the municipality of Escuminac, arranged on the North shore of the Bay of Escuminac, near the confluence of the river.

The Escuminac River is a tributary of the North shore of the Escuminac Bay located at the confluence of the Restigouche River; this bay opens to the East on the Chaleur Bay. The latter in turn opens to the East in the Gulf of St. Lawrence.

The lower part of the Escuminac River is accessible by "East Escuminac road" along the Escuminac River from route 132 (Perron Boulevard); or either by Escuminac Northwest road to the hamlet Escuminac North. From the "fork Cellard", the upper part of the river is accessible by forest roads, one of which runs along the bottom and middle of the North Escuminac River (Quebec).

== Geography ==
The Escuminac River originates from mountain streams at 515 metres (1,690 ft) above sea level in the Fauvel (township), in the unorganized territory Rivière-Nouvelle, Quebec. This source is located at:

- 2.6 kilometres (1.6 mi) West of the boundary of Vallée (township);
- 33.1 kilometres (20.6 mi) Northwest from the confluence of the Escuminac River.

The Escuminac River flows Southeast, on the East side of the Assemetquagan River, and the West side of the Nouvelle River and Little Nouvelle River.

From its source, the course of the river flows on 44.6 kilometres (27.7 mi) following these segments:

Upper Courses of the river (segment of 22.5 kilometres (14.0 mi))

- 5.6 kilometres (3.5 mi) to the South, up to a creek (from the Northeast);
- 1.8 kilometres (1.1 mi) Southward, up to Rachel Brook (from the East);
- 2.3 kilometres (1.4 mi) Southward, up to Patrica stream (from the North);
- 2.8 kilometres (1.7 mi) to the South, up to the confluence of the "Ravine of the Riviere du Loup";
- 0.8 kilometres (0.50 mi) to the Southeast, up to Big Creek (from the West);
- 4.0 kilometres (2.5 mi) to the Southwest, up to the boundary of Vallée (township);
- 0.5 kilometres (0.31 mi) to the South in the Vallée (township), up to Falls Creek (from the Northeast);
- 0.6 kilometres (0.37 mi) to the Southwest, up to the limit of Mann (township);
- 1.5 kilometres (0.93 mi) to the South in the Mann (township), up to the stream of canyon Hells (from the Southwest);
- 2.6 kilometres (1.6 mi) to the Southeast, up to the stream of Quinn canyon (from the Southwest);

Lower course of the river (segment of 24.1 kilometres (15.0 mi))

- 2.8 kilometres (1.7 mi) to the Northeast, up to the Burnt Land stream (from the North);
- 3.8 kilometres (2.4 mi) to the Southeast, up to Dawson Creek (from the Southwest);
- 5.0 kilometres (3.1 mi) Eastward up to Cassidy canyon (from the South);
- 1.5 kilometres (0.93 mi) Eastward up to the border of Nouvelle (township) (municipality of Escuminac);
- 1.0 kilometre (0.62 mi) to the Northeast, up to the confluence of the North Escuminac River (Quebec) (from the West);
- 2.2 kilometres (1.4 mi) to the East, up to the confluence of the stream of La Garde (from the North);
- 2.3 kilometres (1.4 mi) to the Southeast, up to the highway bridge of the hamlet Escuminac North;
- 4.3 kilometres (2.7 mi) to the Southeast, up to the highway bridge;
- 0.8 kilometres (0.50 mi) Southward, up to the Route 132;
- 0.4 kilometres (0.25 mi) to the South, passing under the railway bridge of Canadian National Railway, up to the confluence of the river.

The Escuminac River empties into a little bay on the North shore of the Bay of Escuminac, located at the confluence of the Restigouche River. At low tide, the sandstone at the confluence of the Escuminac River extends up to 1.8 kilometres (1.1 mi) in the Bay of Escuminac.

The confluence of the Escuminac River is located at:

- 15.2 kilometres (9.4 mi) Northeast of "Pointe aux Corbeaux", at the Eastern end of the peninsula Miguasha jutting Eastward in the Chaleur Bay;
- 7.1 kilometres (4.4 mi) North of the North shore of New Brunswick;
- 19.1 kilometres (11.9 mi) Northeast of the bridge over the Restigouche River linking the city of Campbellton, New Brunswick and the village of Pointe-à-la-Croix, Quebec.

== Toponymy ==
The "Micmac" designate that river "Nipitua'qaneg river", meaning "place bushy" or "which shoots in flight."

In 1815, the surveyor Bouchette meant that stream "Semenac R". On an 1845 map, the mount is called "Mt. Scaumenac ". The current form was approved in 1918 by the Geographic Board

The toponym "Escuminac River" was formalized on December 5, 1968, at the Commission de toponymie du Québec (Quebec Names Board)

== Notes ==
Media related to Category: Escuminac River at Wikimedia Commons

=== Related Articles ===
- Gaspésie
- Chaleur Bay
- Rivière-Nouvelle, Quebec, an unorganized territory
- Pointe-à-la-Croix, Quebec, a municipality
- Escuminac, Quebec, a municipality
- North Escuminac, a hamlet
- North Escuminac (Québec) River, a stream
- Restigouche River, a stream
