= Rivière-Nouvelle =

- Unorganized territory
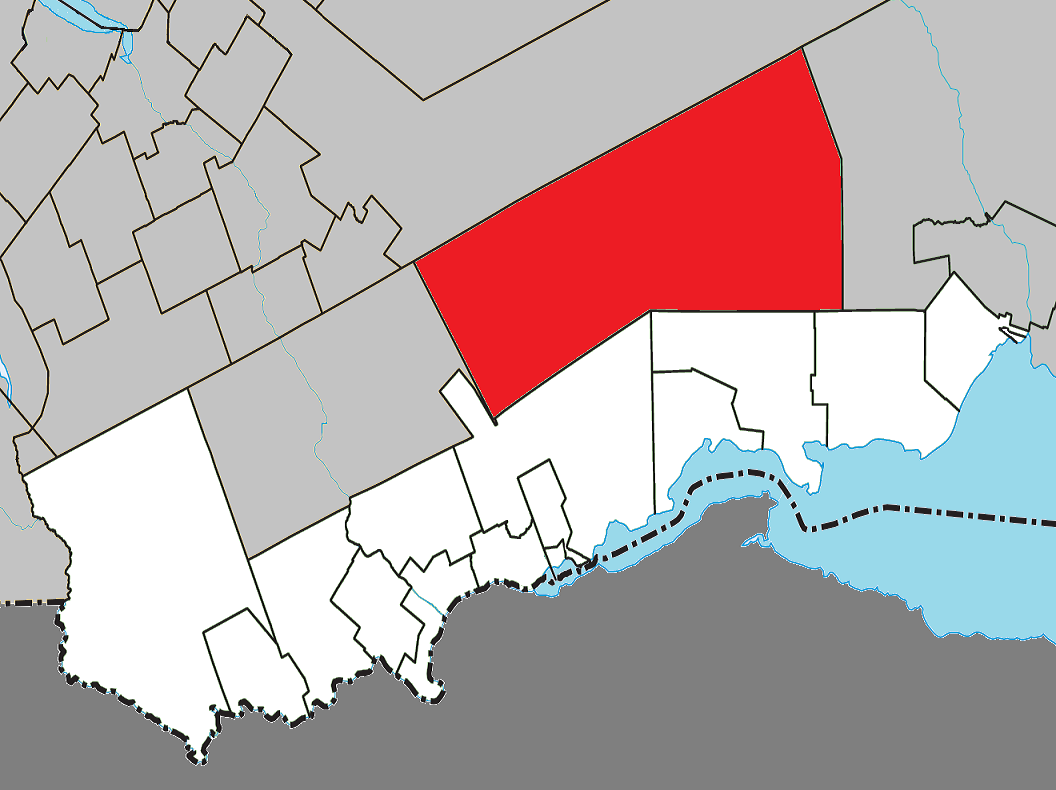
- Location within Avignon RCM

- Location in eastern Quebec
- Coordinates: 48°18′N 66°29′W
- Country: Canada
- Province: Quebec
- Region: Gaspésie– Îles-de-la-Madeleine
- RCM: Avignon
- Constituted: January 1, 1986

Government
  - Federal riding: Gaspésie—Les Îles-de-la-Madeleine—Listuguj
  - Prov. riding: Bonaventure

Area
  - Total: 1,086.9 km^{2} (419.7 sq mi)
  - Land: 1,087.60 km^{2} (419.92 sq mi)
- There is an apparent contradiction between two authoritative sources.

Population (2021)
  - Total: 0
  - Density: 0/km^{2} (0/sq mi)
  - Pop (2016-21): 0.0%
  - Dwellings: 0
- Time zone: UTC−05:00 (EST)
  - Summer (DST): UTC−04:00 (EDT)
- Highways: No major routes

Rivière-Nouvelle (French pronunciation: [ʁivjɛʁ nuvɛl]) is an unorganized territory in the Gaspésie–Îles-de-la-Madeleine region of Quebec, Canada.

The eponymous Nouvelle River (French meaning "new") has its source in the Notre Dame Mountains and is 76 kilometres (47 mi) long. It flows in a southerly direction through the middle of the territory until the Municipality of Nouvelle where its course changes to the south-east before emptying in Chaleur Bay. While its current name has been in use since the 17th century, the Mi'kmaq people called it Tlapatantjitjg, meaning "potatoes" (used metaphorically because of its rocky bottom).

== Demographics ==
Historical Census Data - Rivière-Nouvelle, Quebec

Year	Pop.
1991	0
1996	0
2001	0
2006	0

Year	Pop.
2011	0
2016	0
2021	0

Source: Statistics Canada

== See also ==
- Escuminac River
- Restigouche River
- Chaleur Bay
- List of unorganized territories in Quebec
