= Nouvelle, Quebec =

Nouvelle
- Municipality
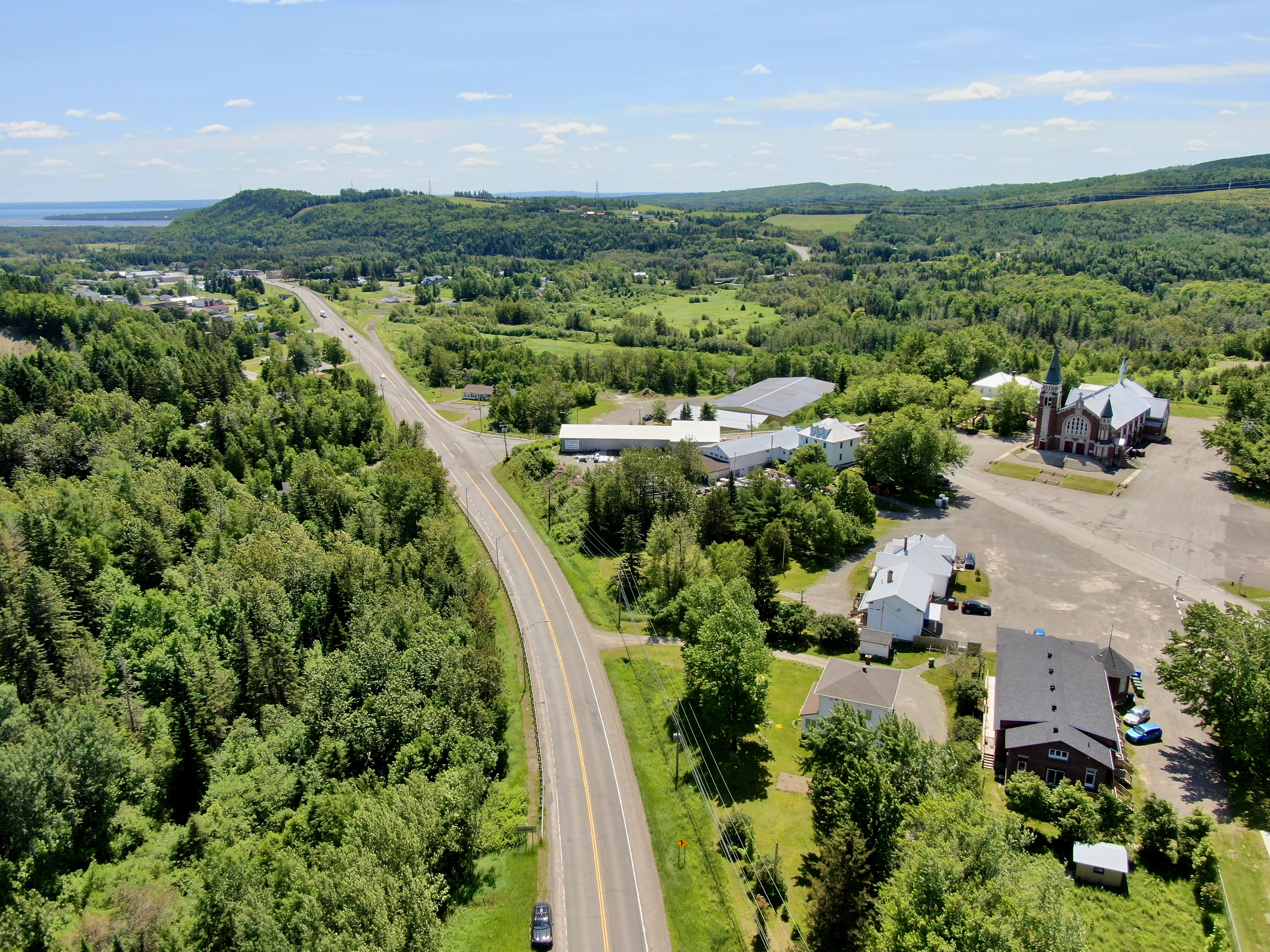
- Skyline of Nouvelle

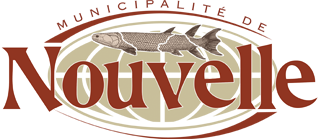
- Seal

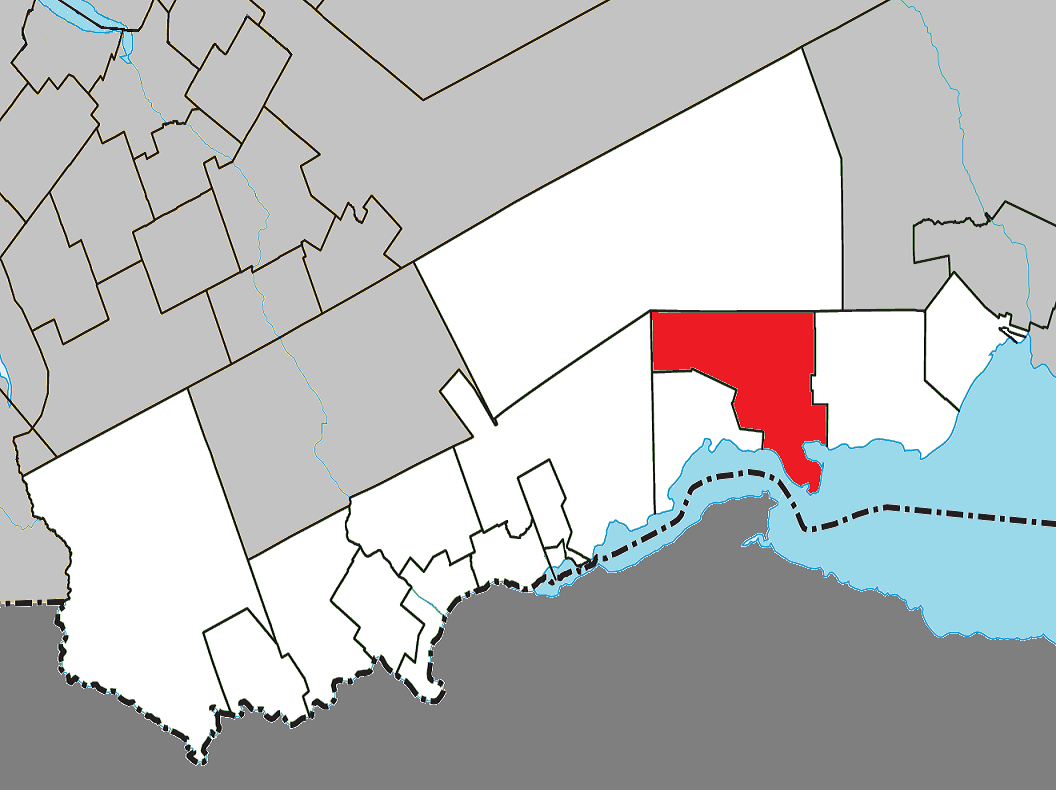
- Location within Avignon RCM

- Location in eastern Quebec
- Coordinates: 48°08′N 66°19′W
- Country: Canada
- Province: Quebec
- Region: Gaspésie– Îles-de-la-Madeleine
- RCM: Avignon
- Settled: late 18th century
- Constituted: October 10, 1907

Government
  - Mayor: Rachel Dugas
  - Federal riding: Gaspésie—Les Îles-de-la-Madeleine—Listuguj
  - Prov. riding: Bonaventure

Area
  - Total: 236.48 km^{2} (91.31 sq mi)
  - Land: 234.66 km^{2} (90.60 sq mi)
- Elevation: 7.00 m (22.97 ft)

Population (2021)
  - Total: 1,782
  - Density: 7.6/km^{2} (20/sq mi)
  - Pop 2016-2021: ▲6.0%
  - Dwellings: 931
- Time zone: UTC−5 (EST)
  - Summer (DST): UTC−4 (EDT)
- Postal code(s): G0C 2E0
- Area codes: 418 and 581
- Highways: R-132
- Website: nouvellegaspesie.com

Nouvelle (French pronunciation: [nuvɛl]) is a municipality in eastern Quebec, Canada, on the south shore of the Gaspé Peninsula at the mouth of the Nouvelle River, where the Restigouche River widens into Chaleur Bay.

In addition to Nouvelle itself, the municipality also includes the communities of Allard, Brébeuf (Dugal), Drapeau, Miguasha, Miguasha-Ouest, Nouvelle-Ouest, and Provancher.

Nouvelle's graphic seal is a world globe overlaid by Eusthenopteron foordi, whose fossil discovery brought worldwide fame to the Miguasha National Park, now a UNESCO World Heritage Site within the municipality. The seal's red and gray colours represent the colors of the rocks present on the fossil site.

== History ==
Nouvelle was first settled by Acadians fleeing the deportation of 1755, fish merchants from Jersey, Channel Islands and some Irish. The name Nouvelle (French meaning "new") was used as early as the end of the 18th century and stood for the "new land" being made available west of the town that is now called Carleton-sur-Mer. It first appeared on documents in 1787 by the Jersey businessman Charles Robin and by Abbé Joseph Mathurin Bourg, the first Acadian priest.

In 1842, the geographic township of Nouvelle was proclaimed. In 1845, the township, which included the area now known as Escuminac, was first incorporated as the Municipality of Shoolbred. It was named after John Shoolbred, who was the first owner of the seignory granted there. In 1847, the municipality was abolished, but it re-established in 1855. From 1861, it was known as the Township Municipality of Nouvelle-et-Shoolbred.

On July 1, 1869, the local mission was proclaimed as a parish, known as Saint-Jean-l'Évangéliste (Saint John the Evangelist). In 1881, the post office opened, also designated as Saint-Jean-l'Évangéliste.

In 1907, the place separated from the township municipality and formed the Municipality of Nouvelle-et-Shoolbred-Partie-Nord-Est. It was renamed in 1912 to Municipality of Saint-Jean-l'Évangéliste, and on December 5, 1953, it was renamed again to the Municipality of Nouvelle. The same year, the post office name followed suit.

== Geography ==
=== Climate ===
Climate data for Nouvelle (1981–2010)
Month	Jan	Feb	Mar	Apr	May	Jun	Jul	Aug	Sep	Oct	Nov	Dec	Year
Record high °C (°F)	8.5 (47.3)	11.1 (52.0)	17.0 (62.6)	27.5 (81.5)	33.0 (91.4)	33.5 (92.3)	34.5 (94.1)	35.0 (95.0)	32.0 (89.6)	23.9 (75.0)	17.8 (64.0)	12.8 (55.0)	35.0 (95.0)
Mean daily maximum °C (°F)	−7.5 (18.5)	−5.0 (23.0)	0.8 (33.4)	7.1 (44.8)	15.1 (59.2)	20.6 (69.1)	23.6 (74.5)	22.9 (73.2)	17.3 (63.1)	10.6 (51.1)	3.0 (37.4)	−3.4 (25.9)	8.8 (47.8)
Daily mean °C (°F)	−12.3 (9.9)	−10.4 (13.3)	−4.3 (24.3)	2.5 (36.5)	9.3 (48.7)	14.7 (58.5)	17.9 (64.2)	17.2 (63.0)	12.0 (53.6)	6.1 (43.0)	−0.4 (31.3)	−7.4 (18.7)	3.7 (38.7)
Mean daily minimum °C (°F)	−17.0 (1.4)	−15.8 (3.6)	−9.4 (15.1)	−2.1 (28.2)	3.4 (38.1)	8.7 (47.7)	12.1 (53.8)	11.4 (52.5)	6.6 (43.9)	1.6 (34.9)	−3.8 (25.2)	−11.3 (11.7)	−1.3 (29.7)
Record low °C (°F)	−35.0 (−31.0)	−33.0 (−27.4)	−29.5 (−21.1)	−18.0 (−0.4)	−6.7 (19.9)	−2.5 (27.5)	2.2 (36.0)	−0.5 (31.1)	−5.6 (21.9)	−9.4 (15.1)	−20.0 (−4.0)	−28.5 (−19.3)	−35.0 (−31.0)
Average precipitation mm (inches)	73.3 (2.89)	49.8 (1.96)	58.4 (2.30)	59.1 (2.33)	82.4 (3.24)	85.8 (3.38)	100.0 (3.94)	88.4 (3.48)	73.0 (2.87)	88.0 (3.46)	84.9 (3.34)	70.2 (2.76)	913.3 (35.96)
Average rainfall mm (inches)	11.3 (0.44)	7.5 (0.30)	26.3 (1.04)	44.4 (1.75)	81.9 (3.22)	85.8 (3.38)	100.0 (3.94)	88.4 (3.48)	73.0 (2.87)	87.5 (3.44)	62.5 (2.46)	24.7 (0.97)	693.3 (27.30)
Average snowfall cm (inches)	62.0 (24.4)	42.3 (16.7)	32.1 (12.6)	15.2 (6.0)	0.5 (0.2)	0.0 (0.0)	0.0 (0.0)	0.0 (0.0)	0.0 (0.0)	0.5 (0.2)	22.3 (8.8)	45.5 (17.9)	220.5 (86.8)
Average precipitation days (≥ 0.2 mm)	11.3	9.5	9.7	11.4	12.9	12.2	13.4	12.3	12.8	13.1	13.0	11.0	142.6
Average rainy days (≥ 0.2 mm)	1.7	1.8	3.9	8.9	12.7	12.2	13.4	12.3	12.8	13.0	9.2	3.5	105.2
Average snowy days (≥ 0.2 cm)	10.8	8.3	6.4	3.1	0.14	0.0	0.0	0.0	0.05	0.11	4.3	8.9	42.1
Source: Environment Canada

== Demographics ==
Canada census – Nouvelle community profile

	2021	2016	2011
Population	1,782 (+6.0% from 2016)	1,659 (-1.8% from 2011)	1,689 (-6.9% from 2006)
Land area	234.66 km^{2} (90.60 sq mi)	232.43 km^{2} (89.74 sq mi)	232.16 km^{2} (89.64 sq mi)
Population density	7.6/km^{2} (20/sq mi)	7.1/km^{2} (18/sq mi)	7.3/km^{2} (19/sq mi)
Median age	50.4 (M: 49.6, F: 51.2)	52.5 (M: 53.0, F: 52.1)	49.7 (M: 49.8, F: 49.6)
Private dwellings	931 (total) 829 (occupied)	849 (total)	935 (total)
Median household income	$63,200	$53,696	$41,737

References: 2021 2016 2011

Historical Census Data - Nouvelle, Quebec

Year	Pop.	±%
1861	1,561	—
1871	1,650	+5.7%
1881	2,228	+35.0%
1891	2,150	−3.5%
1901	2,446	+13.8%
1911	2,226	−9.0%
1921	1,780	−20.0%
1931	1,942	+9.1%

Year	Pop.	±%
1941	2,511	+29.3%
1951	2,537	+1.0%
1956	3,030	+19.4%
1961	2,711	−10.5%
1966	2,460	−9.3%
1971	2,508	+2.0%
1976	2,271	−9.4%
1981	2,280	+0.4%

Year	Pop.	±%
1986	2,137	−6.3%
1991	2,111	−1.2%
1996	2,009	−4.8%
2001	1,960	−2.4%
2006	1,815	−7.4%
2011	1,689	−6.9%
2016	1,659	−1.8%
2021	1,782	+7.4%

Population figures based on revised counts.
Source: Statistics Canada

== Attractions ==
=== Museums and other points of interest ===
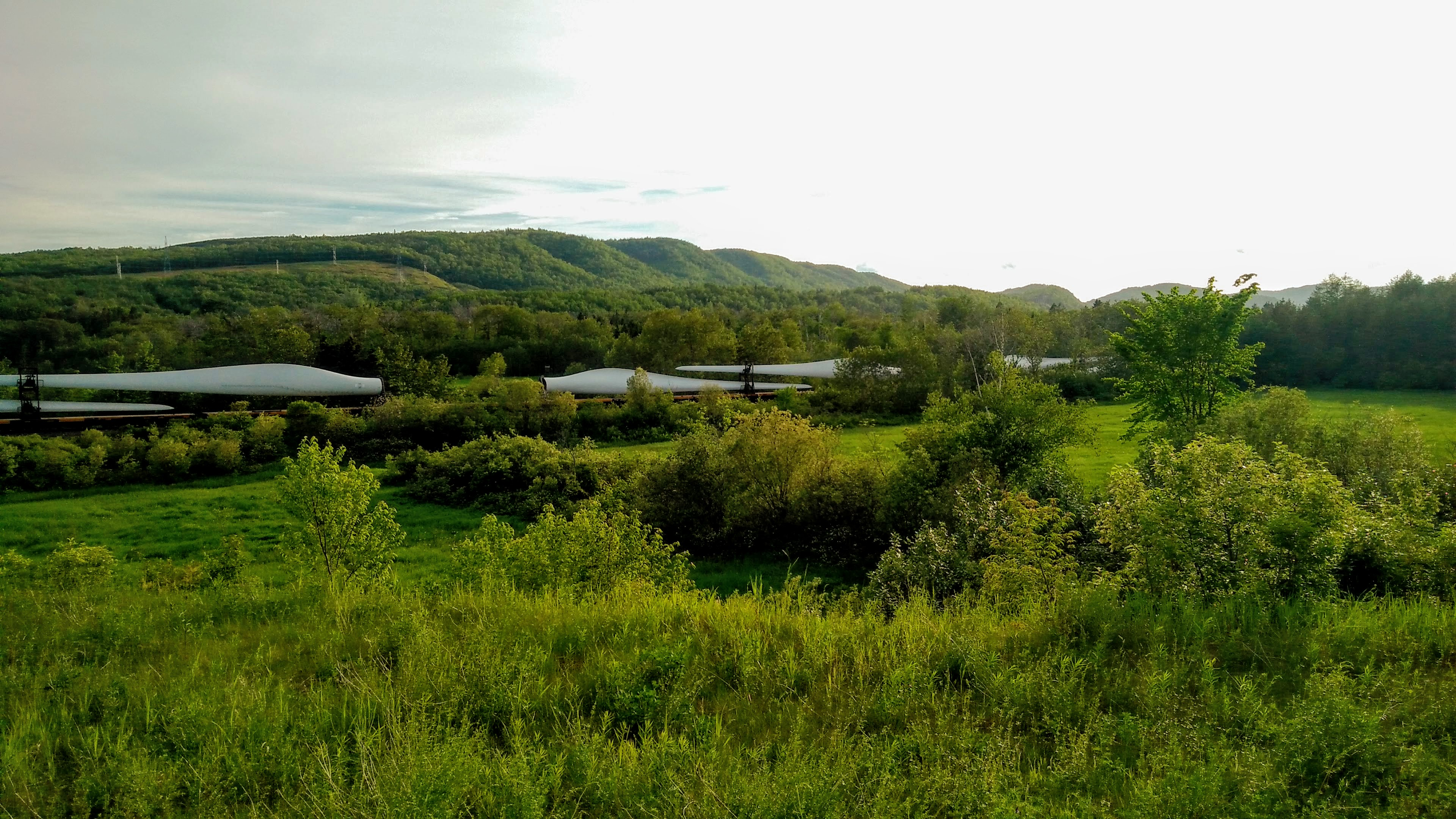
Wind turbines blades on railroad near Nouvelle in 2019

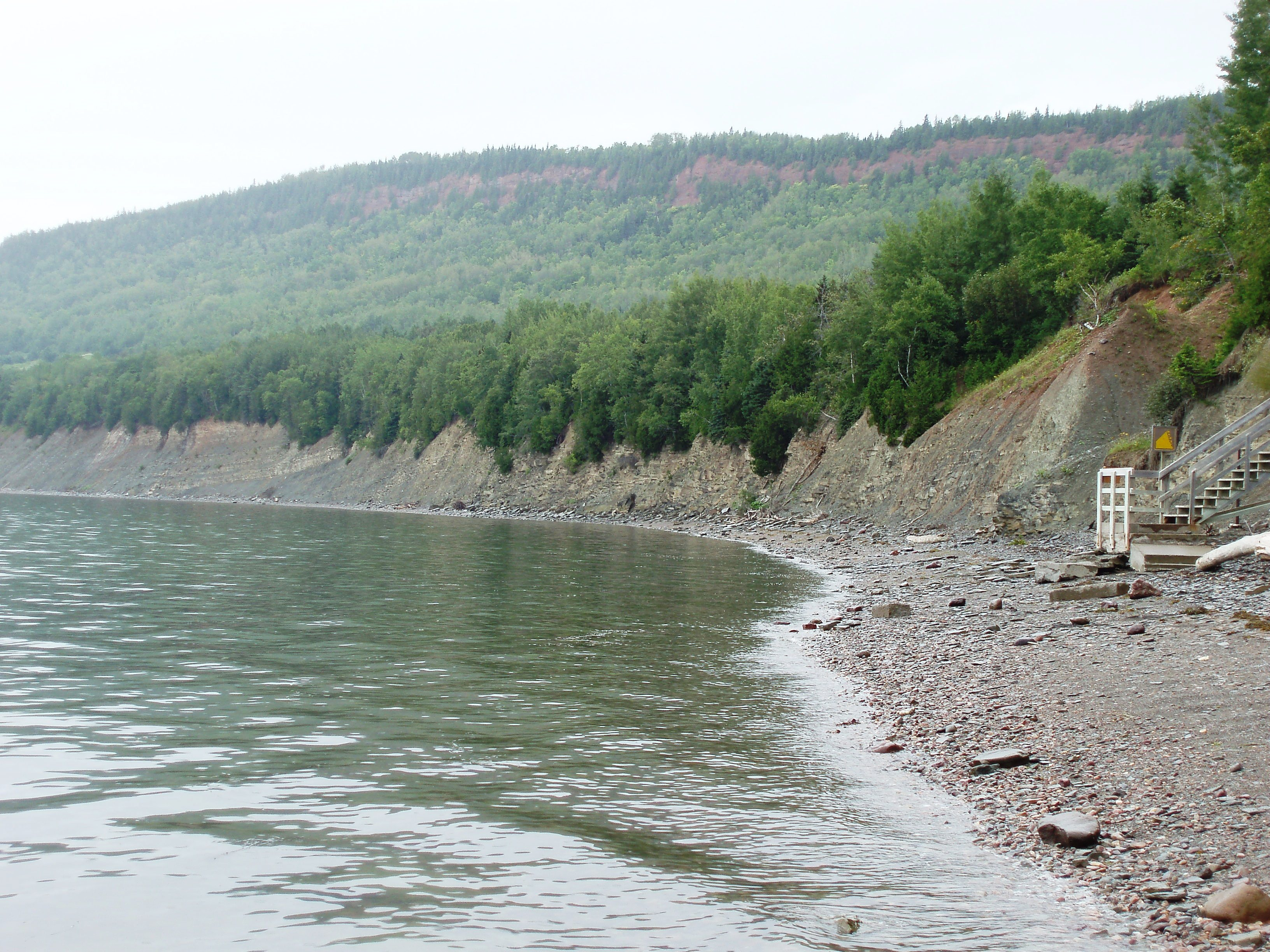
Miguasha National Park

- Fishing. The Rivière-Nouvelle ZEC (including "Petite rivière Nouvelle" and "ruisseau Mann") is world-renowned for its sea trout fly fishing and Atlantic salmon.
- Fossils. World class museum of natural history at the Miguasha National Park.
- Miguasha beach. The word Miguasha comes from the Mi'kma "Mégueck Shawk" meaning longtime red, referring to the majestic red cliffs of the Bonaventure Formation
- Miguasha port facility offers yachting services and ferry service from July to September.
- 50+ Games. The 5th edition of the Jeux des 50 ans et plus de la Gaspésie et des Îles-de-la-Madeleine will take place here June 12–15, 2008.

=== Recreation venues ===
- Centre sportif Louis-Sleigher (skating arena), named in honour of the first native of Nouvelle to play for the NHL
- Sport fishing
- Hunting (ruffed grouse or partridge, moose, deer and black bear)
- Tennis courts
- Soccer field
- Nature trails
- Snowmobile and ATV trails
- Harness racing

== Education ==
- Commission scolaire René-Lévesque (used to be Commisstion scolaire Tracadièche, from the Mi'kma «Place of many herons»
- Elementary schools: École centrale
- Highschool students attend École Antoine-Bernard de Carleton

== See also ==
- List of municipalities in Quebec
- Zec de la Rivière-Nouvelle, a zone d'exploitation contrôlée (controlled harvesting zone)
