= Escuminac, Quebec =

Escuminac
- Municipality
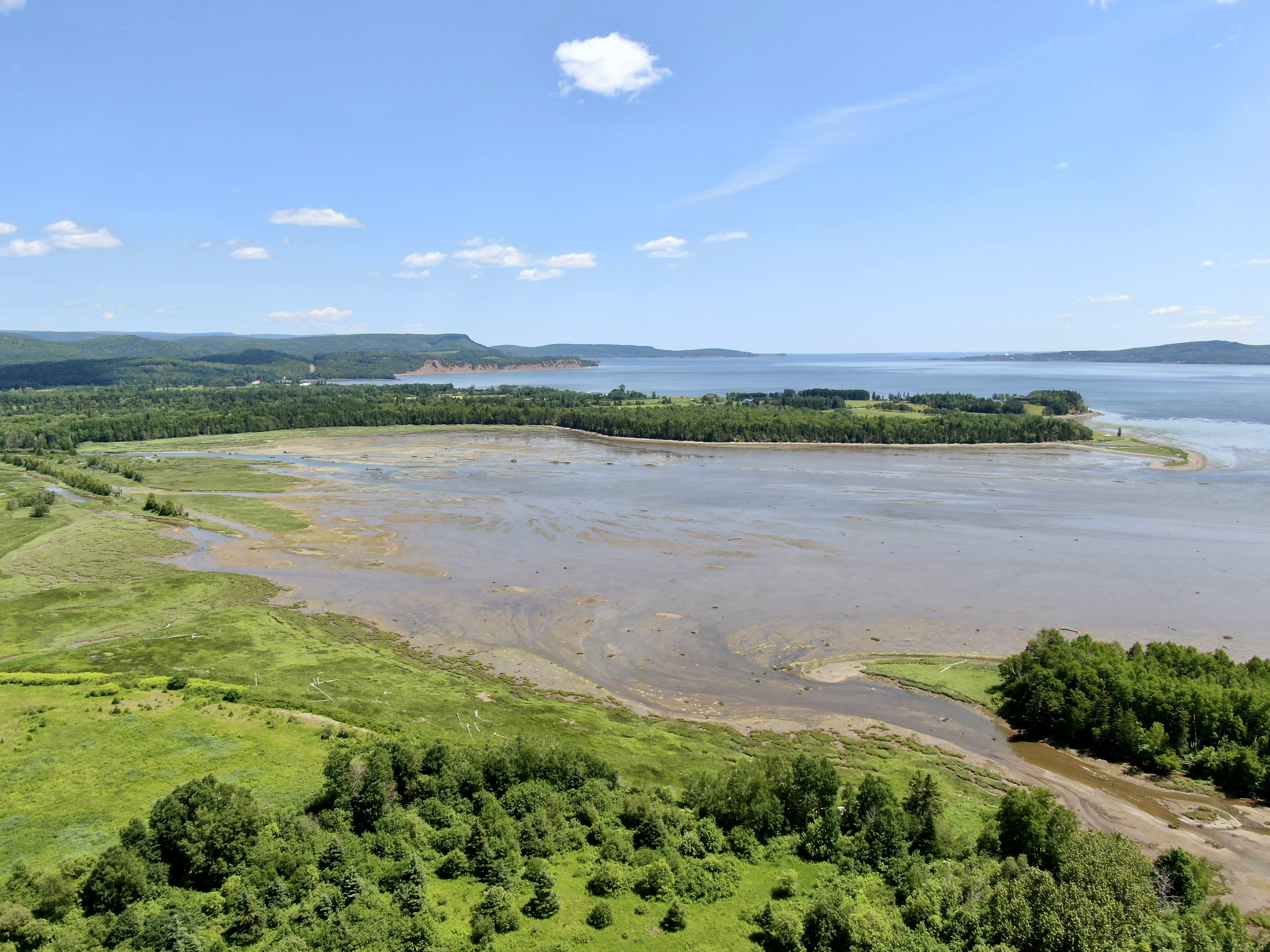
- Skyline of Escuminac Flats

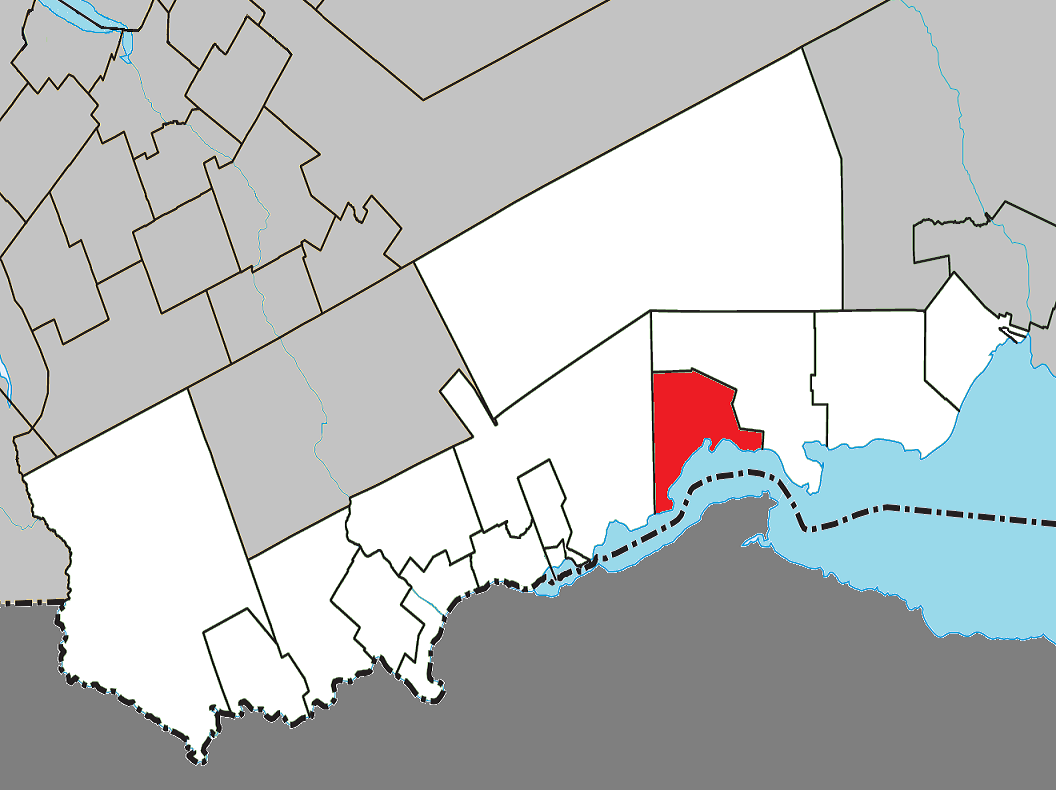
- Location within Avignon RCM

- Location in eastern Quebec
- Coordinates: 48°07′N 66°29′W
- Country: Canada
- Province: Quebec
- Region: Gaspésie– Îles-de-la-Madeleine
- RCM: Avignon
- Settled: 2nd half of 18th century
- Constituted: October 10, 1907

Government
  - Mayor: Sylvain Roy
  - Federal riding: Gaspésie—Les Îles-de-la-Madeleine—Listuguj
  - Prov. riding: Bonaventure

Area
  - Total: 108.93 km^{2} (42.06 sq mi)
  - Land: 108.70 km^{2} (41.97 sq mi)

Population (2021)
  - Total: 575
  - Density: 5.3/km^{2} (14/sq mi)
  - Pop (2016-21): ▲5.7%
  - Dwellings: 317
- Time zone: UTC−5 (EST)
  - Summer (DST): UTC−4 (EDT)
- Postal code(s): G0C 2M0
- Area codes: 418 and 581
- Highways: R-132
- Website: www.escuminac.org

Escuminac (French pronunciation: [ɛskyminak]) is a municipality in Quebec, Canada, on the north shore of the Restigouche River.

In addition to Escuminac itself, the municipality also includes the communities of Escuminac Flats, Fleurant, and Pointe-à-la-Garde.

According to missionary Joseph-Étienne Guinard, Escuminac is a Mi'kmaq word meaning "here are small fruits", originally identifying a point of land jutting into the Restigouche River. But this translation has been disputed as fanciful. It has been spelled in various ways over time, including Semenac, Scamanac, Scaumenac, Escouminac, Scoumenac, and Scouminac.

== History ==
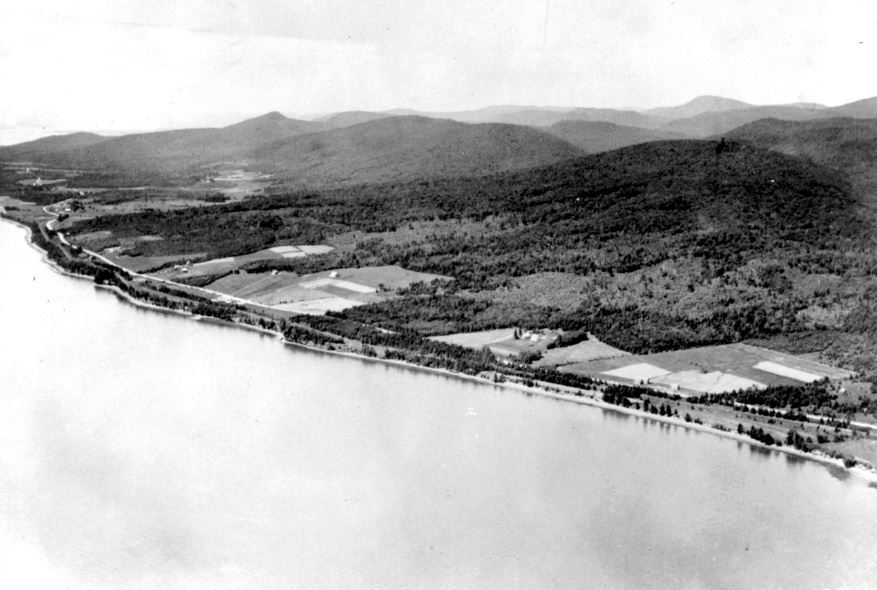
Village of Pointe-à-la-Garde, Bonaventure County, 1927

The area was first colonized by American Loyalist farmers and loggers.

In 1845, the Municipality of Shoolbred, which included the area now known as Nouvelle, was first incorporated. It was named after John Shoolbred, who was the first owner of the seignory granted there. In 1847, the municipality was abolished but re-established in 1855. From 1861 on, it was known as the Township Municipality of Nouvelle-et-Shoolbred.

In 1907, the township municipality was split into the Municipalities of Nouvelle-et-Shoolbred-Partie-Nord-Est (that became Nouvelle in 1953) and Nouvelle-et-Shoolbred-Partie-Sud-Ouest. This latter one was renamed to Escuminac in 1912.

== Demographics ==
=== Population ===
Canada census – Escuminac community profile

	2021	2016	2011
Population	575 (+5.7% from 2016)	544 (-7.5% from 2011)	588 (-8.8% from 2006)
Land area	108.70 km^{2} (41.97 sq mi)	108.20 km^{2} (41.78 sq mi)	108.43 km^{2} (41.87 sq mi)
Population density	5.3/km^{2} (14/sq mi)	5.0/km^{2} (13/sq mi)	5.4/km^{2} (14/sq mi)
Median age	52.4 (M: 52.4, F: 52.4)	49.0 (M: 47.3, F: 50.6)	46.1 (M: 45.7, F: 46.6)
Private dwellings	317 (total) 268 (occupied)	297 (total) 241 (occupied)	326 (total)
Median household income	$60,800	$49,280	$.N/A

Notes: 2011 income data for this area has been suppressed for data quality or confidentiality reasons.
References: 2021 2016 2011

Historical Census Data - Escuminac, Quebec

Year	Pop.	±%
1911	468	—
1921	528	+12.8%
1931	588	+11.4%
1941	642	+9.2%
1951	816	+27.1%
1956	847	+3.8%
1961	849	+0.2%

Year	Pop.	±%
1966	829	−2.4%
1971	727	−12.3%
1976	674	−7.3%
1981	652	−3.3%
1986	659	+1.1%
1991	632	−4.1%
1996	661	+4.6%

Year	Pop.	±%
2001	604	−8.6%
2006	645	+6.8%
2011	588	−8.8%
2016	544	−7.5%
2021	575	+5.7%

Source: Statistics Canada

=== Language ===
Mother tongue (2021):

- English as first language: 23.5%
- French as first language: 74.8%
- English and French as first language: 2.6%
- Other as first language: 0%

== See also ==
- Escuminac River
- Escuminac, New Brunswick
- Chaleur Bay
- List of anglophone communities in Quebec
- List of municipalities in Quebec
