= Saint-Alexis-de-Matapédia =

- Municipality
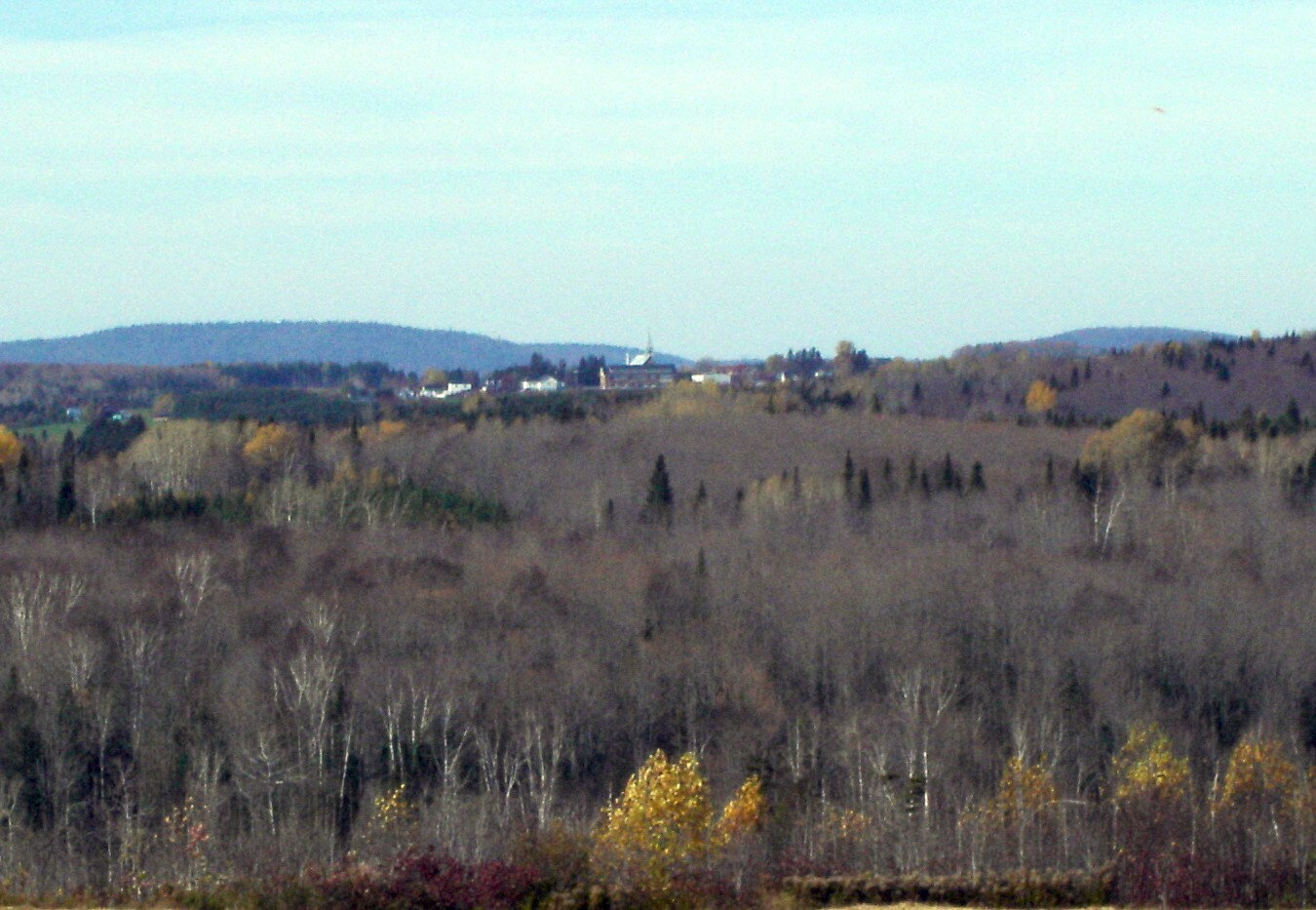

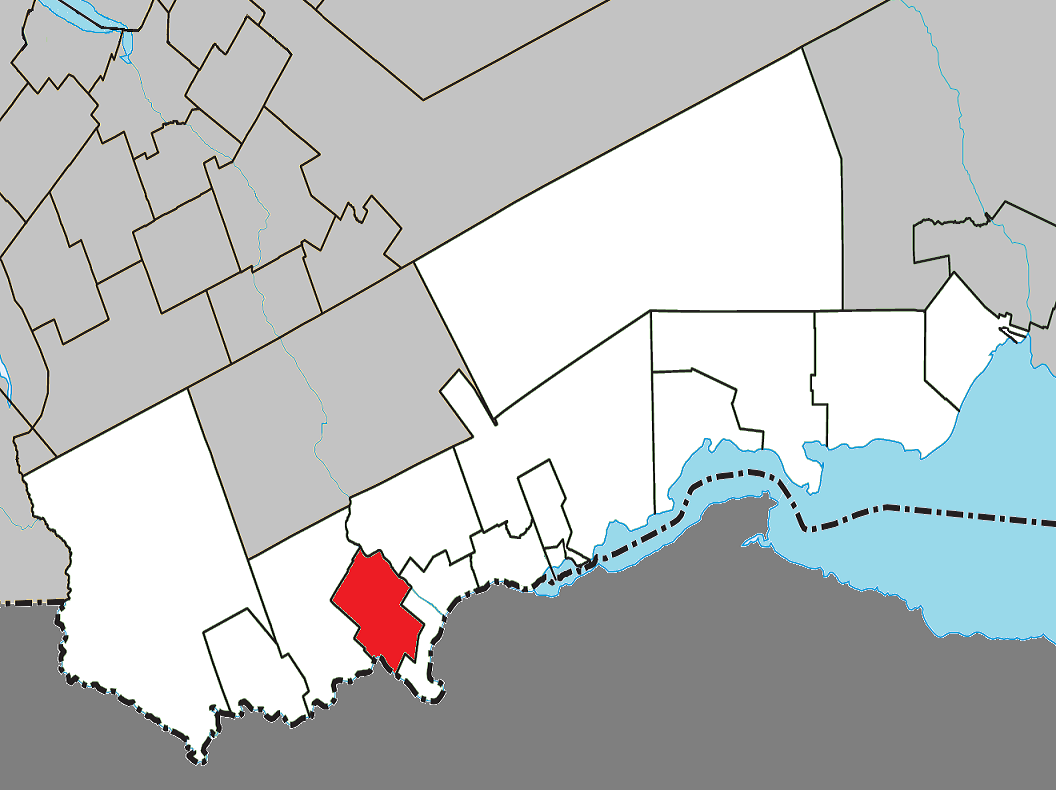
- Location within Avignon RCM

- Location in eastern Quebec
- Coordinates: 47°58′N 67°03′W
- Country: Canada
- Province: Quebec
- Region: Gaspésie– Îles-de-la-Madeleine
- RCM: Avignon
- Constituted: July 1, 1855

Government
  - Mayor: Cynthia Dufour
  - Federal riding: Gaspésie—Les Îles-de-la-Madeleine—Listuguj
  - Prov. riding: Bonaventure

Area
  - Total: 85.07 km^{2} (32.85 sq mi)
  - Land: 84.91 km^{2} (32.78 sq mi)

Population (2021)
  - Total: 519
  - Density: 6.1/km^{2} (16/sq mi)
  - Pop (2016–21): ▲3.8%
  - Dwellings: 285
- Time zone: UTC−5 (EST)
  - Summer (DST): UTC−4 (EDT)
- Postal code(s): G0J 2E0
- Area codes: 418 and 581
- Highways: No major routes
- Website: www.matapedia lesplateaux.com

Saint-Alexis-de-Matapédia (French pronunciation: [sɛ̃t‿alɛksi də matapedja]) is a village and municipality in the Gaspésie–Îles-de-la-Madeleine region of eastern Quebec, Canada.

In addition to Saint-Alexis-de-Matapédia itself, the municipality also includes the communities of Léonard-de-Matapédia and Saint-Benoît-de-Matapédia.

Its name comes from Alexis Mailloux (1801-1877), a Roman Catholic vicar general who presided over the founding of the parish, and from the Matapedia river and township, in turn from the Mi'kmaq word matapegiag, meaning "river which forks".

== History ==
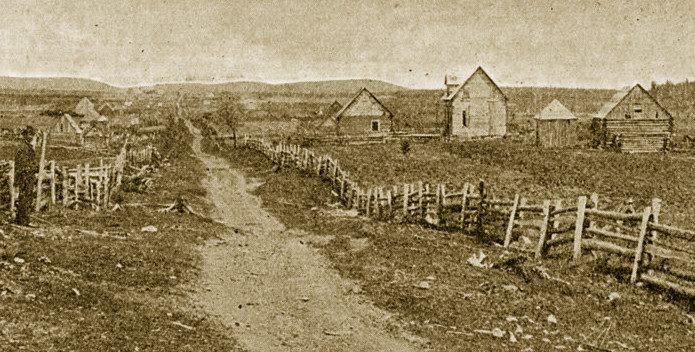
Saint-Alexis-de-Matapédia ca. 1895

The place was first incorporated in 1845 as the Township Municipality of Matapédia. Its first inhabitants were Acadians from Rustico, Prince Edward Island, who arrived around 1860. That same year, a mission was established that became a parish in 1870.

The local post office opened in 1866 under the name Avignon, but was renamed to Saint-Alexis-de-Matapédia in 1922. Sometime before the 1920s, the municipality had changed its status and name to the Parish Municipality of Saint-Alexis-de-Matapédia.

In 1966, the Municipality of Saint-Benoit was merged into Saint-Alexis-de-Matapédia.

In 2003, the Parish Municipality of Saint-Alexis-de-Matapédia changed statutes to become a regular municipality.

== Demographics ==
Canada census – Saint-Alexis-de-Matapédia community profile

	2021	2016	2011
Population	519 (+3.8% from 2016)	500 (-8.8% from 2011)	548 (-12.3% from 2006)
Land area	84.91 km^{2} (32.78 sq mi)	84.09 km^{2} (32.47 sq mi)	84.40 km^{2} (32.59 sq mi)
Population density	6.1/km^{2} (16/sq mi)	5.9/km^{2} (15/sq mi)	6.5/km^{2} (17/sq mi)
Median age	58.8 (M: 56.8, F: 61.2)	57.3 (M: 56.3, F: 58.4)	54.3 (M: 52.5, F: 57.1)
Private dwellings	285 (total) 249 (occupied)	283 (total) 232 (occupied)	286 (total)
Median household income	$48,000	$39,765	$34,713

References: 2021 2016 2011

Historical Census Data – Saint-Alexis-de-Matapédia, Quebec

Year	Pop.	±%
1921	1,923	—
1931	933	−51.5%
1941	757	−18.9%
1951	969	+28.0%
1956	1,001	+3.3%
1961	979	−2.2%

Year	Pop.	±%
1966	1,314	+34.2%
1971	1,101	−16.2%
1976	1,022	−7.2%
1981	904	−11.5%
1986	851	−5.9%
1991	786	−7.6%

Year	Pop.	±%
1996	747	−5.0%
2001	665	−11.0%
2006	625	−6.0%
2011	548	−12.3%
2016	500	−8.8%
2021	519	+3.8%

Population counts are not adjusted for boundary changes.
Source: Statistics Canada

== See also ==
- List of municipalities in Quebec
