= Avignon Regional County Municipality =

Avignon
- Regional county municipality
- Coordinates: 48°06′N 66°51′W
- Country: Canada
- Province: Quebec
- Region: Gaspésie– Îles-de-la-Madeleine
- Effective: March 18, 1981
- County seat: Carleton-sur-Mer

Government
  - Type: Prefecture
  - Prefect: Bertrand Berger

Area
  - Total: 3,479.40 km^{2} (1,343.40 sq mi)
  - Land: 3,487.51 km^{2} (1,346.54 sq mi)
- There is an apparent contradiction between two authoritative sources

Population (2016)
  - Total: 14,461
  - Density: 4.1/km^{2} (11/sq mi)
  - Change 2011-2016: ▼5.1%
  - Dwellings: 7,340
- Time zone: UTC−5 (EST)
  - Summer (DST): UTC−4 (EDT)
- Area codes: 418 and 581
- Website: www.mrcavignon.com

Avignon (French pronunciation: [aviɲɔ̃]) is a regional county municipality located in the Gaspésie–Îles-de-la-Madeleine region of Quebec, Canada. Its seat and largest city is Carleton-sur-Mer.

It is on the Gaspé Peninsula, along Chaleur Bay.

== Subdivisions ==
There are 13 subdivisions and 2 native reserves within the RCM:

Cities & towns (1)

- Carleton-sur-Mer

Municipalities (10)

- Escuminac
- L'Ascension-de-Patapédia
- Maria
- Matapédia
- Nouvelle
- Pointe-à-la-Croix
- Ristigouche-Sud-Est
- Saint-Alexis-de-Matapédia
- Saint-André-de-Restigouche
- Saint-François-d'Assise

Unorganized territories (2)

- Rivière-Nouvelle
- Ruisseau-Ferguson

Native reserves (2)
(not associated with RCM)

- Gesgapegiag 2
- Listuguj

== Demographics ==
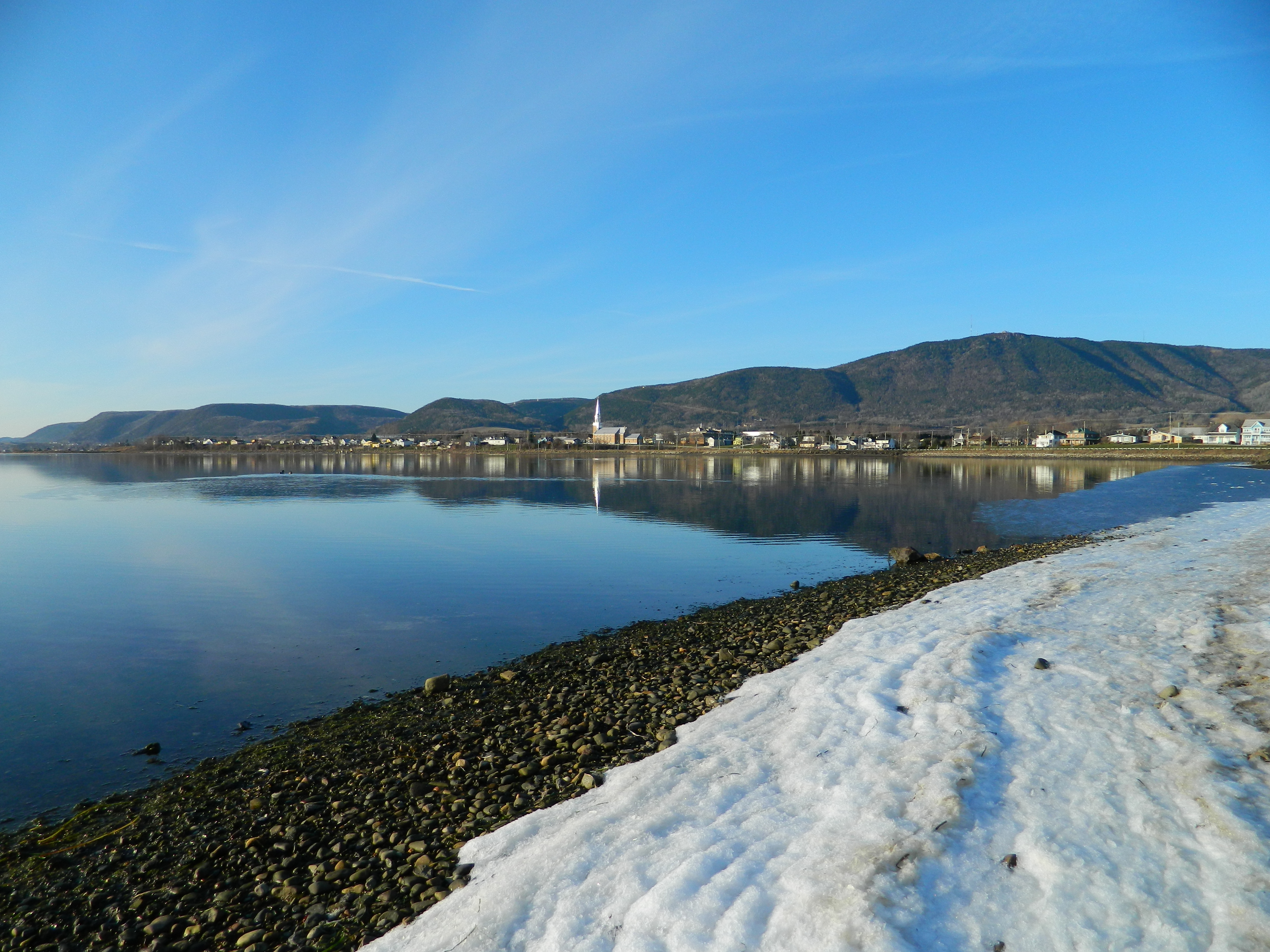
Carleton-sur-Mer

=== Population ===
Canada census – Avignon community profile

	2021	2016	2011
Population	13,415 (-7.2% from 2016)	14,461 (-5.1% from 2011)	15,246 (+4.1% from 2006)
Land area	3,487.37 km^{2} (1,346.48 sq mi)	3,487.51 km^{2} (1,346.54 sq mi)	3,486.51 km^{2} (1,346.15 sq mi)
Population density	3.8/km^{2} (9.8/sq mi)	4.1/km^{2} (11/sq mi)	4.4/km^{2} (11/sq mi)
Median age	52.8 (M: 52.0, F: 54.0)	49.9 (M: 48.7, F: 50.6)	46.6 (M: 46.0, F: 47.2)
Private dwellings	6,967 (total) 6,281 (occupied)	7,340 (total)	7,472 (total)
Median household income	$60,800	$48,370	$41,117

Notes: 2006 population excludes census data for one or more incompletely enumerated Indian reserves or settlements.
References: 2021 2016 2011

Historical census data - Avignon Regional County Municipality, Quebec

Year	Pop.	±%
1991	15,494	—
1996	15,898	+2.6%

Year	Pop.	±%
2001	15,268	−4.0%
2006	14,643	−4.1%

Year	Pop.	±%
2011	15,246	+4.1%
2016	14,461	−5.1%

2006 population excludes census data for one or more incompletely enumerated Indian reserves or settlements.

=== Language ===
Canada Census mother tongue - Avignon Regional County Municipality, Quebec
Census	Total	French			English			French & English			Other		
Year	Responses	Count	Trend	Pop %	Count	Trend	Pop %	Count	Trend	Pop %	Count	Trend	Pop %
2016	14,260	11,550	▼1.1%	81.0%	2,025	▼20.7%	14.2%	105	▼8.7%	0.7%	580	▼17.7%	4.1%
2011	15,050	11,675	▼2.3%	77.57%	2,555	▲51.6%	16.98%	115	▲91.7%	0.76%	705	▼1.4%	4.68%
2006	14,415	11,955	▲0.8%	82.93%	1,685	▼25.4%	11.69%	60	▼40.0%	0.42%	715	▼3.4%	4.96%
2001	14,960	11,860	▼6.6%	79.28%	2,260	▲14.7%	15.10%	100	▲25.0%	0.67%	740	▼8.6%	4.95%
1996	15,560	12,700	n/a	81.62%	1,970	n/a	12.66%	80	n/a	0.51%	810	n/a	5.21%

== Transportation ==
=== Access routes ===
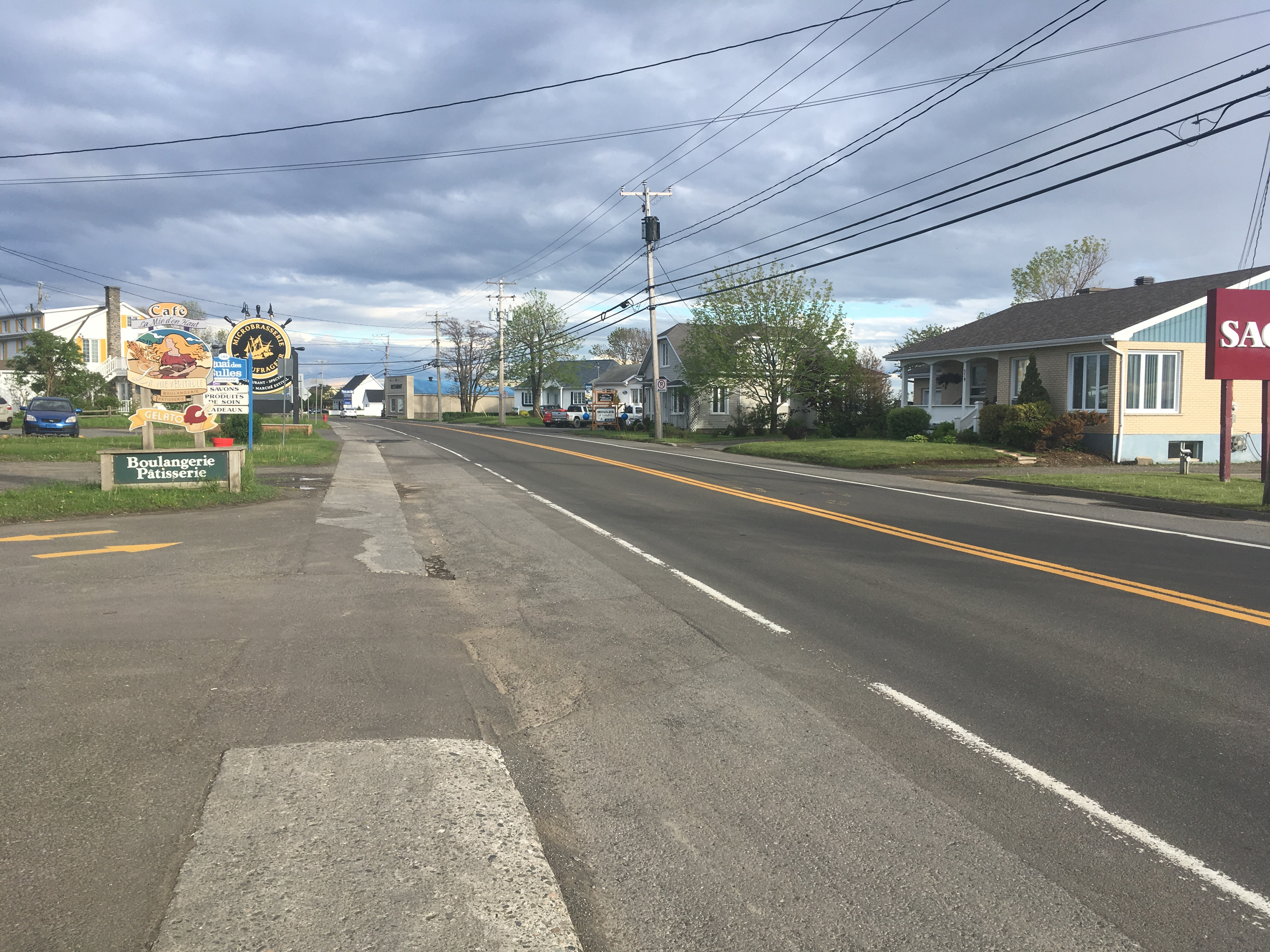
Quebec Route 132 in Carleton-sur-Mer

Highways and numbered routes that run through the municipality, including external routes that start or finish at the county border:

- Autoroutes
  - None
- Principal highways
  - R-132
- Secondary highways
  - None
- External routes
  - None

== Attractions ==
- Battle of Restigouche National Historic Site (Pointe-à-la-Croix)
- Fort Listiguj (Pointe-à-la-Croix)
- Notre-Dame-du-Mont-St-Joseph Oratory (Carleton---Saint Omer)

== Protected areas ==
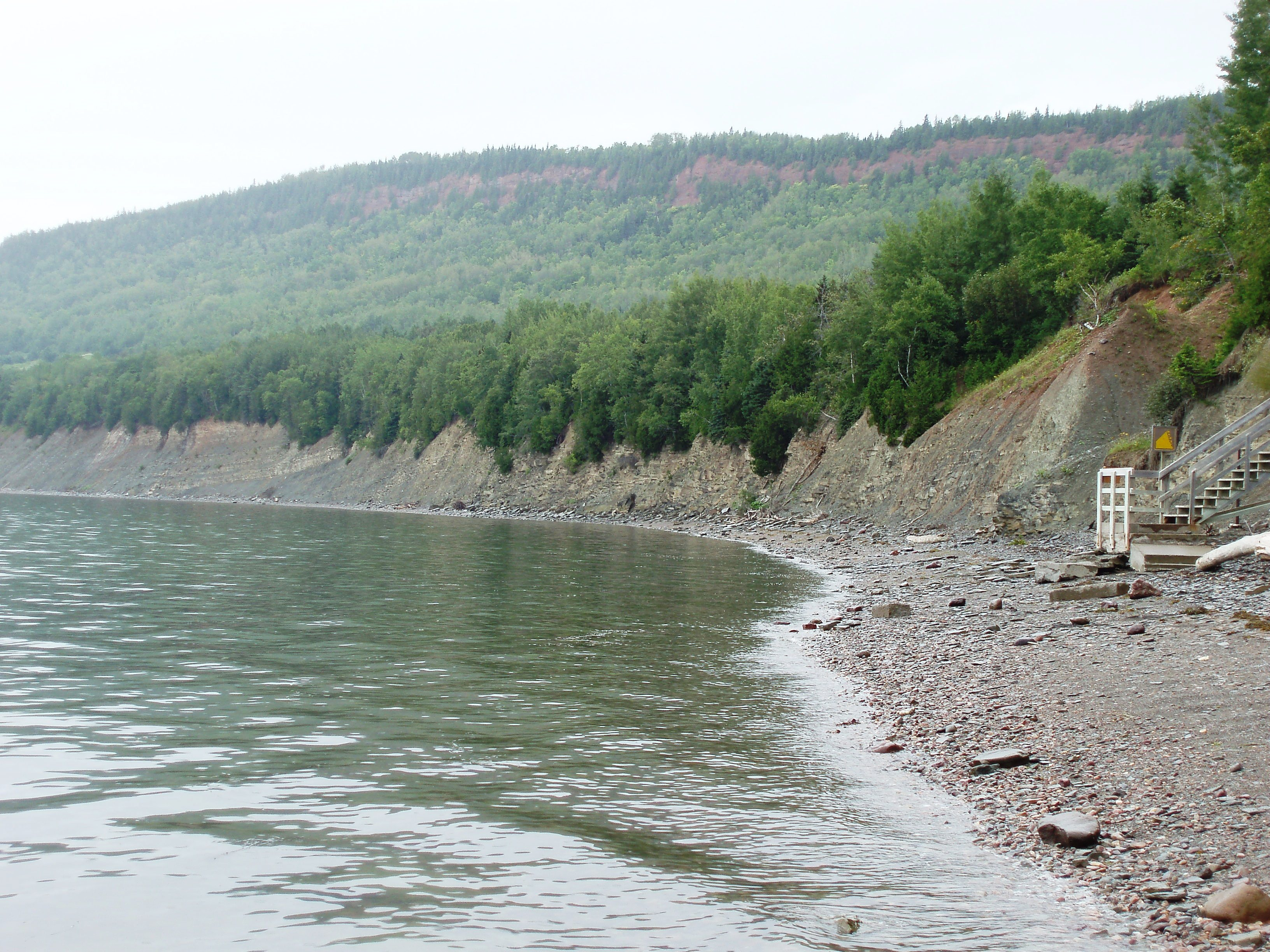
Miguasha Provincial Park

- Casualt ZEC
- Rivières-Matapédia et Patapédia Wildlife Reserve
- Miguasha Provincial Park
- Saint-Omer National Migratory Bird Sanctuary

== See also ==
- List of regional county municipalities and equivalent territories in Quebec
