= L'Ascension-de-Patapédia =

- Municipality
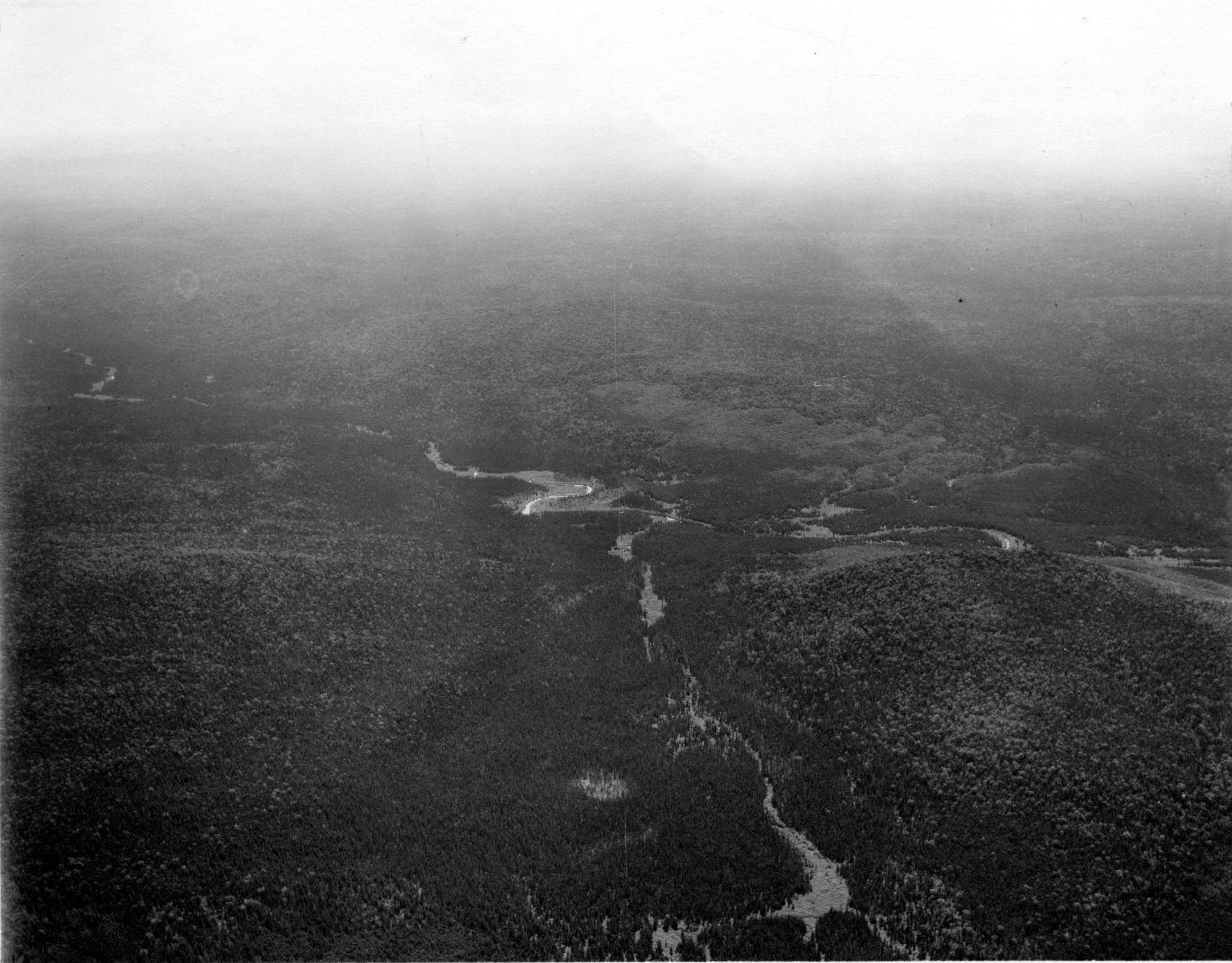
- Motto: Courage, foi, tenacité
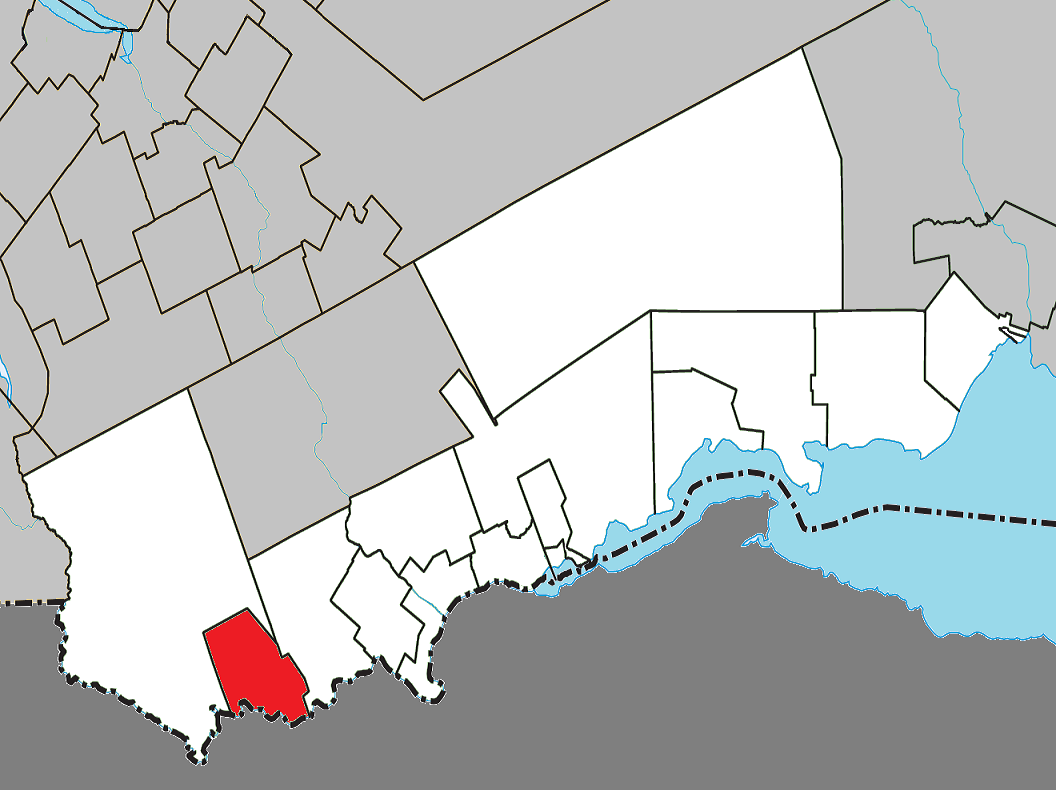
- Location within Avignon RCM

- Location in eastern Quebec
- Coordinates: 47°56′N 67°15′W
- Country: Canada
- Province: Quebec
- Region: Gaspésie– Îles-de-la-Madeleine
- RCM: Avignon
- Settled: 1930s
- Constituted: January 1, 1968

Government
  - Mayor: Guy Richard
  - Federal riding: Gaspésie—Les Îles-de-la-Madeleine—Listuguj
  - Prov. riding: Bonaventure

Area
  - Total: 97.05 km^{2} (37.47 sq mi)
  - Land: 95.98 km^{2} (37.06 sq mi)
- Elevation: 280 m (920 ft)

Population (2021)
  - Total: 148
  - Density: 1.5/km^{2} (3.9/sq mi)
  - Pop (2016–21): ▼9.8%
  - Dwellings: 111
- Time zone: UTC−5 (EST)
  - Summer (DST): UTC−4 (EDT)
- Postal code(s): G0J 1R0
- Area codes: 418 and 581
- Highways: No major routes
- Website: www.matapedialesplateaux.com/lascension-de-patapedia/

L'Ascension-de-Patapédia (French pronunciation: [lasɑ̃sjɔ̃ də patapedja]) is a municipality in Quebec, Canada.

Being surrounded by large tracts of boreal forest, the place is economically dependent on the forestry industry, as well as some hunting and fishing tourism.

== History ==
While the geographic township of Patapédia was proclaimed in 1881, it was not until 1937 that the village was founded. That same year the Parish of L'Ascension-de-Notre-Seigneur (French for "Ascension of Our Lord") was established. In 1968, the Municipality of L'Ascension-de-Patapédia was incorporated, named after the parish and the township.

== Demographics ==
In the 2021 Census of Population conducted by Statistics Canada, L'Ascension-de-Patapédia had a population of 148 living in 87 of its 111 total private dwellings, a change of −9.8% from its 2016 population of 164. With a land area of 95.98 km^{2} (37.06 sq mi), it had a population density of 1.9/km^{2} (4.9/sq mi) in 2021.

Canada census – L'Ascension-de-Patapédia community profile

	2021	2016	2011
Population	148 (-9.8% from 2016)	164 (-13.7% from 2011)	190 (-11.2% from 2006)
Land area	95.98 km^{2} (37.06 sq mi)	95.93 km^{2} (37.04 sq mi)	94.31 km^{2} (36.41 sq mi)
Population density	1.5/km^{2} (3.9/sq mi)	1.7/km^{2} (4.4/sq mi)	2.0/km^{2} (5.2/sq mi)
Median age	63.6 (M: 63.2, F: 63.6)	58.8 (M: 58.5, F: 59.0)	56.4 (M: 54.8, F: 59.5)
Private dwellings	111 (total) 87 (occupied)	113 (total)	112 (total)
Median household income	$.N/A	$34,176	$.N/A

Notes: Income data for this area has been suppressed for data quality or confidentiality reasons.
References: 2021 2016 2011

Historical Census Data - L'Ascension-de-Patapédia, Quebec

Year	Pop.	±%
1971	635	—
1976	444	−30.1%
1981	383	−13.7%
1986	345	−9.9%
1991	303	−12.2%
1996	267	−11.9%

Year	Pop.	±%
2001	231	−13.5%
2006	214	−7.4%
2011	190	−11.2%
2016	164	−13.7%
2021	148	−9.8%

Source: Statistics Canada

== See also ==
- List of municipalities in Quebec
