= Marc-Boris St-Maurice =

Canadian politician (born 1969)

Leader of the Marijuana Party of Canada
- In office 2000–2004
- Preceded by: Party founded*
- Succeeded by: Blair Longley

Leader of the Bloc Pot
- In office 1998–2000
- Preceded by: Party founded*
- Succeeded by: Hugô St-Onge

Personal details
- Born: 1969 (age 56–57) Québec
- Party: Bloc Pot (1998-2000) Marijuana Party of Canada (2000-2005) Liberal Party of Canada (2005)

Marc-Boris St-Maurice (born 1969) is an activist, politician and Canadian musician, who has campaigned for many years for the legalization of cannabis, and to facilitate access to the drug for health reasons. He lives in Montreal, Quebec.

== Music career ==
St-Maurice first became known in the early 1990s as bassist of punk band Grimskunk. It was then that Marc Saint-Maurice received the nickname "Boris". He left the band in 1999 to focus on his activism in the marijuana legalization movement.

== Political career ==
In 1998, he founded the Bloc Pot, a Quebec provincial political party whose main objective was the decriminalization and eventual legalization of marijuana. In the Quebec general election of that year St-Maurice was the party's candidate in Mercier, placing fourth. In 2000, he created the federal equivalent of the Bloc Pot, the Marijuana Party, which ran candidates in federal elections. That year, St-Maurice was the party's candidate on two separate occasions, first in the byelection to replace resigning Okanagan—Coquihalla MP Jim Hart, then in Laurier—Sainte-Marie in the November general election. While ultimately unsuccessful, St-Maurice's candidacy in the November federal election was an unprecedented result for both St-Maurice and the Marijuana Party. He managed to best the candidates of three major parties (the New Democratic Party, the Progressive Conservatives, and the Canadian Alliance) a relatively rare feat for a minor party. In 2001, St-Maurice returned to Quebec politics to contest the byelection in Jonquière, prompted by the resignation of Lucien Bouchard. The next year he was a candidate in the federal byelection in Saint-Léonard—Saint-Michel, placing last. His final foray into federal politics came in 2004, where he stood as a candidate in LaSalle—Émard, the riding of then Prime Minister Paul Martin.

In February 2005, Saint-Maurice left the Marijuana Party to join the Liberal Party of Canada, arguing that the chances of reaching the objectives pursued by both cannabis rights parties were better in the then ruling party. The movement for marijuana had actually made some progress under Liberal rule in the early 2000s, with decriminalization bills introduced in 2003 and 2004 by the governments of Jean Chrétien and Paul Martin. When Stephen Harper's Conservatives won in the 2006 election, the new government did not continue with this legislation.

In 2009, St-Maurice contested the 2009 Montreal municipal election, seeking the position of city councillor in Jeanne-Mance. He was ultimately unsuccessfully, losing to Nimâ Machouf of Projet Montreal.

== Compassion Club and activism ==
St-Maurice has experienced trouble with the law when he was a full-time volunteer at the Compassion Club, an organization that provides marijuana to seriously ill individuals with a medical prescription. The first Montreal Compassion Club, based on those in Toronto and British Columbia, was opened on Rachel Street, near a police station.

Following a police raid, St-Maurice and his colleague Alexander Neron were accused of possession and trafficking of narcotics. Their lawyers pleaded that the Canadian legislation left a legal loophole, allowing certain individuals to possess cannabis for medicinal purposes, but not supplying the product in question. Judge Gilles Cadieux halted the proceedings against the two men in December 2002.

St-Maurice is the founder and director of the Montreal Compassion Centre, a medical marijuana facility in downtown Montreal. Prior to the legalization of cannabis in Canada, the centre was raided and shut down in 2011.

== Electoral record ==
=== 2009 Montreal Municipal Election: Jeanne-Mance ===
Party	City Council candidate	Vote	%
Projet Montréal	Nimâ Machouf	3,271	39.90
Vision Montréal	Nathalie Rochefort	2,404	29.32
Union Montréal	Michel Prescott	1,806	22.03
Independent	Marc-Boris St-Maurice	548	6.68
Parti Montréal Ville-Marie	Marc-André Bahl	170	2.07

2004 Canadian federal election: LaSalle—Émard
Party	Candidate	Votes	%	±%	Expenditures
Liberal	Paul Martin	25,806	56.6	-9.2	$58,357
Bloc Québécois	Thierry Larrivée	14,001	30.7	+6.5	$6,381
Conservative	Nicole Roy-Arcelin	2,271	5.0	-1.0	$5,075
New Democratic	Rebecca Blaikie	1,995	4.4	+2.7	$2,226
Green	Douglas Jack	1,000	2.2	–	$410
Marijuana	Marc-Boris St-Maurice	349	0.8	-0.8	
Marxist–Leninist	Jean-Paul Bédard	210	0.5	–	
Total		45,632	100.0	$78,239	

Canadian federal by-election, May 13, 2002: Saint-Léonard—Saint-Michel Retirement of Alfonso Gagliano
Party	Candidate	Votes	%	±%
Liberal	Massimo Pacetti	14,076	83.5	+6.9
Bloc Québécois	Umberto Di Genova	1,495	8.9	-5.6
Progressive Conservative	Antonio Cordeiro	634	3.8	+1.5
New Democratic	Normand Caplette	447	2.7	+1.5
Marijuana	Marc-Boris St-Maurice	197	1.2	-0.2
Total valid votes		16,849	100.0	
Liberal hold		Swing		

Quebec provincial by-election, 2001: Jonquière Resignation of Lucien Bouchard
Party	Candidate	Votes	%	±%
Liberal	Françoise Gauthier	13,077	46.54	+27.19
Parti Québécois	Nicole Racine	8,830	31.42	-29.06
Action démocratique	Michèle Boulianne	5,391	19.18	+14.20
RAP	Gilbert Talbot	480	1.71	-13.13
Bloc Pot	Marc-Boris St-Maurice	323	1.15	–
Total valid votes		28,101	99.04	-0.08
Total rejected ballots		273	0.96	+0.08
Turnout		28,374	63.45	-13.46
Eligible voters		44,716		
Liberal gain		Swing		

2000 Canadian federal election: Laurier—Sainte-Marie
Party	Candidate	Votes	%	±%
Bloc Québécois	Gilles Duceppe	23,473	52.8	−1.9
Liberal	Jean Philippe Côté	11,451	25.7	+2.8
Green	Dylan Perceval-Maxwell	2,169	4.9	+2.5
Marijuana	Marc-Boris St-Maurice	2,156	4.8	–
New Democratic	Richard Chartier	2,121	4.8	+0.3
Progressive Conservative	Jean François Tessier	1,879	4.2	−7.7
Alliance	Stéphane Prud'homme	960	2.2	–
Marxist–Leninist	Ginette Boutet	269	0.6	−0.1
Total valid votes		44,478	100.0	
Bloc Québécois hold		Swing		

Canadian federal by-election, September 11, 2000: Okanagan—Coquihalla Resignation of Jim Hart
Party	Candidate	Votes	%	±%
Alliance	Stockwell Day	19,417	70.30	+17.24
New Democratic	Ken Ellis	3,470	12.56	+0.81
Green	Joan Russow	2,115	7.66	+5.49
Canadian Action	Jack William Peach	1,159	4.20	–
Independent	Jim Strauss	689	2.49	–
Independent	Marc-Boris St-Maurice	438	1.59	–
Independent	Dennis Earl Baker	223	0.81	–
Independent	Rad Gajic	108	0.39	–
Total valid votes		27,619	100.0	
Alliance hold		Swing		+8.22

1998 Quebec general election: Mercier
Party	Candidate	Votes	%	±%
Parti Québécois	Robert Perreault	17,552	55.38	−1.10
Liberal	Elizabeth da Silva	9,005	28.42	−2.13
Action démocratique	Paul Benevides	2,818	8.89	+3.47
Bloc Pot	Marc-Boris St-Maurice	985	3.11	–
Socialist Democracy	Guylaine Sirard	873	2.75	+0.12
Independent	Ann Farrell	158	0.50	–
Natural Law	Pierre Bergeron	154	0.49	−0.34
Marxist–Leninist	Normand Chouinard	79	0.25	−0.08
Communist	Pierre Smith	67	0.21	−0.21
Total valid votes		31,691	98.47	+1.03
Total rejected ballots		493	1.53	-1.03
Turnout		32,184	75.28	-5.05
Eligible voters		42,755		
Parti Québécois hold		Swing		+0.52
Source: Official Results, Le Directeur général des élections du Québec.
