= Parti de la Democratie Socialiste candidates in the 1998 Quebec provincial election =

1998 Quebec provincial election canditates

The Parti de la démocratie socialiste (PDS) ran ninety-seven candidates in the 1998 Quebec provincial election, none of whom were elected. Information about these candidates may be found on this page.

== Candidates ==
(n.c.: no candidate)

Riding	Candidate's name	Gender	Votes	%	Rank
Abitibi-Est	Jake Rouleau	M	144	0.60	5th
Abitibi-Ouest	n.c.				
Acadie	Julien Lapan	M	136	0.39	5th
Anjou	Bernard Beaulieu	M	192	0.71	4th
Argenteuil	Michel Lecompte	M	128	0.33	7th
Arthabaska	n.c.				
Beauce-Nord	Serge Foisy	M	127	0.49	4th
Beauce-Sud	Berthier Guay	M	233	0.72	4th
Beauharnois-Huntingdon	Eric Thibodeau	M	147	0.45	5th
Bellechasse	Lise Rose	F	184	0.77	4th
Berthier	François Rivest	M	297	0.79	4th
Bertrand	Jacques Rose	M	125	0.37	4th
Blainville	Denise Gagnon	F	182	0.52	4th
Bonaventure	n.c.				
Borduas	Sylvie Laperle	F	274	0.90	4th
Bourassa	Marc Lajeunesse	M	189	0.76	4th
Bourget	Sylvain Desjardins	M	185	0.68	4th
Brome-Missisquoi	n.c.				
Chambly	Maryse-Laurence Lewis	F	117	0.27	6th
Champlain	Claude Mercier	M	137	0.38	5th
Chapleau	Julie Lavoie	F	281	0.69	4th
Notes: Julie Lavoie was twenty-eight years old at the time of the election. A report in the Ottawa Citizen described her as a Quebec sovereigntist. She received 281 votes (0.69%), finishing fourth against Liberal candidate Benoît Pelletier.
Charlesbourg	Jean-Pierre Duchesneau	M	273	0.70	5th
Charlevoix	Guillaume Tremblay	M	183	0.76	4th
Châteauguay	Victorien Pilote	M	114	0.32	5th
Chauveau	Josée Larouche	F	519	1.12	4th
Chicoutimi	Jean-Guy Tremblay	M	177	0.51	4th
Chomedey	Jean-Pierre Roy	M	195	0.48	5th
Chutes-de-la-Chaudière	Mario Trépanier	M	358	0.79	4th
Crémazie	Martine Lauzon	F	218	0.71	4th
D'Arcy-McGee	Abraham Weizfeld	M	135	0.42	5th
Deux-Montagnes	Luc Charlebois	M	141	0.30	5th
Drummond	n.c.				
Dubuc	n.c.				
Duplessis	n.c.				
Fabre	Jean Célestin Pichon	M	156	0.36	4th
Notes: Jean Célestin Pichon received 156 votes (0.36%), finishing fourth against incumbent Parti Québécois cabinet minister Joseph Facal.
Frontenac	n.c.				
Gaspé	n.c.				
Gatineau	Benoît Giguère	M	202	0.67	5th
Gouin	Geneviève Ricard	F	624	2.04	4th
Groulx	Mathieu Perron	M	171	0.49	5th
Hochelaga-Maisonneuve	Félix Lapan	M	292	1.37	4th
Hull	Marc Bonhomme	M	291	0.91	4th
Iberville	n.c.				
Îles-de-la-Madeleine	n.c.				
Jacques-Cartier	Eugène Busque	M	217	0.55	5th
Jeanne-Mance	Stéphane Simard	M	78	0.27	5th
Jean-Talon	Sébastien Bouchard	M	326	1.15	4th
Notes: Sébastien Bouchard was also Union des forces progressistes candidate in Vanier in the 2003 general election and Québec solidaire candidate in Chauveau in the 2012 general election.
Johnson	Patrice Côté	M	290	0.98	4th
Joliette	Alexandre Martel	M	504	1.43	4th
Jonquière	n.c.				
Kamouraska-Témiscouata	Jérôme Frédéric Bouchard	M	334	1.29	4th
Labelle	Nicole Vallée	F	218	0.75	4th
Notes: Nicole Vallée received 218 votes (0.75%), finishing fourth against incumbent Parti Québécois cabinet minister Jacques Léonard.
Lac-Saint-Jean	n.c.				
LaFontaine	Pierre-Yves Legault	M	161	0.40	5th
La Peltrie	Guillaume Boivin	M	492	1.09	4th
La Pinière	Gabriel Ste-Marie	M	125	0.33	4th
Laporte	Lise Fournier	F	317	0.86	4th
Laprairie	Louis Préfontaine	M	242	0.52	4th
L'Assomption	Richard-Olivier Mayer	M	214	0.52	5th
Laurier-Dorion	Milan Mirich	M	490	1.43	4th
Notes: See the 2000 federal election for biographical notes for Milan Mirich.
Laval-des-Rapides	Nathalie Toussaint	F	117	0.38	5th
Laviolette	n.c.				
Lévis	Paul Biron	M	196	0.62	4th
Limoilou	Denis Cusson	M	345	1.05	4th
Lotbinière	n.c.				
Louis-Hébert	Claude Pelletier	M	169	0.53	4th
Marguerite-Bourgeoys	Robert Aillaud	M	161	0.47	6th
Marguerite-D'Youville	Jonathan Bérubé	M	240	0.61	5th
Marie-Victorin	Pierre Klépock	M	245	0.81	5th
Marquette	n.c.				
Maskinongé	n.c.				
Masson	Marco Legrand	M	143	0.52	5th
Matane	n.c.				
Matapédia	Réjean Lamarre	M	238	1.04	4th
Mégantic-Compton	Yves Couturier	M	174	0.69	4th
Mercier	Guylaine Sirard	F	873	2.75	5th
Mille-Îles	Jocelyne Desautels	F	156	0.39	5th
Montmagny-L'Islet	n.c.				
Montmorency	Linda Fick	F	267	0.60	5th
Mont-Royal	Robbie Mahood		167	0.55	6th
Nelligan	Érik Cossette	M	156	0.33	5th
Nicolet-Yamaska	Robert Poirier	M	157	0.56	4th
Notre-Dame-de-Grâce	Marie Bertrand	F	256	0.88	5th
Orford	Josué Côté	M	352	0.85	4th
Outremont	Armand Vaillancourt	M	545	1.76	4th
Papineau	Patrick Aubé	M	126	0.43	5th
Pointe-aux-Trembles	Hugues Tremblay	M	205	0.69	4th
Pontiac	Mohamed-Ali Khreis	M	108	0.37	6th
Portneuf	Jérôme Larouche	M	298	0.92	4th
Prévost	Brigitte Lippens	F	229	0.62	4th
Richelieu	Isabelle Latour	F	246	0.78	5th
Notes: Isabelle Latour received 246 votes (0.78%), finishing fifth against incumbent Parti Québécois cabinet minister Sylvain Simard.
Richmond	n.c.				
Rimouski	Manon Côté	F	192	0.65	5th
Notes: Manon Côté was also the NPDQ candidate in Rimouski in the 1994 election and the Québec solidaire candidate in the 2008 election in Kamouraska-Témiscouata.
Rivière-du-Loup	Louis Leroux	M	61	0.26	6th
Robert-Baldwin	n.c.				
Roberval	Pieter Wentholt	M	294	0.91	4th
Rosemont	Roy Semak	M	263	0.89	5th
Rousseau	Francis Martin	M	243	0.74	4th
Rouyn-Noranda–Témiscamingue	Luc Legault	M	360	1.11	4th
Saguenay	Hélène Lévesque	F	159	0.65	4th
Sainte-Marie–Saint-Jacques	Ginette Gauthier	F	629	2.01	5th
Notes: Ginette Gauthier was a Communist Party of Canada candidate in the 1988 federal election, led the Communist Party of Quebec from 1991 to 1994, and may have been its leader during the 1994 provincial election. She later left the Communist Party to join the PDS. Electoral record: Election / Division / Party / Votes / % / Place / Winner; 1988 federal / LaSalle—Émard / Communist / 212 / 0.41 / 5/6 / Paul Martin, Liberal; 1994 provincial / Mercier / Communist / 129 / 0.42 / 8/9 / Robert Perreault, Parti Québécois; 1998 provincial / Sainte-Marie–Saint-Jacques / Socialist Democracy / 629 / 2.01 / 5/10 / André Boulerice, Parti Québécois
Saint-François	Patrick Jasmin	M	296	0.89	4th
Saint-Henri–Sainte-Anne	Sonia Marcoux	F	205	0.70	4th
Saint-Hyacinthe	Jacques Bousquet	M	295	0.69	4th
Saint-Jean	n.c.				
Saint-Laurent	Richard Lahaie	M	129	0.36	6th
Saint-Maurice	n.c.				
Salaberry-Soulanges	Francis Ruel	M	253	0.61	4th
Sauvé	Eric Fontaine	M	172	0.71	5th
Shefford	n.c.				
Sherbrooke	n.c.				
Taillon	Pascal Durand	M	345	0.86	4th
Taschereau	Alain Marcoux	M	521	2.16	4th
Terrebonne	Richard Chartier	M	210	0.59	4th
Trois-Rivières	n.c.				
Ungava	n.c.				
Vachon	n.c.				
Vanier	Michèle Dionne	F	429	1.11	4th
Vaudreuil	Yves Marie Christin	M	218	0.49	5th
Verchères	Germain Dallaire	M	335	1.07	4th
Verdun	Daniel Pharand	M	151	0.46	7th
Viau	Caroline Perron	F	426	1.59	4th
Viger	Alain Bernatchez	M	168	0.58	4th
Vimont	Martin Duplantis	M	215	0.47	5th
Westmount	Sorem Kvist	M	224	0.68	5th
