= Independent candidates in the 1985 Quebec provincial election =

There were thirty-six independent and non-affiliated candidates in the 1985 Quebec provincial election, none of whom were elected. Information about these candidates may be found on this page.

== Electoral divisions ==
=== Mercier: Gilles Côté ===
Gilles Côté was forty-seven years old in 1985 and identified as a taxi driver. A member of the Social Credit Party of Canada, he ran for public office several times in the 1980s at the federal, provincial, and municipal levels.

A candidate named Gilles Côté ran for the Ralliement national party in the 1966 provincial election. It is assumed this was the same person.

Electoral record
| Election | Division | Party | Votes | % | Place | Winner |
|---|---|---|---|---|---|---|
| 1966 provincial | D'Arcy-McGee | Ralliement national | 129 | 0.47 | 4/4 | Victor Goldbloom, Liberal |
| 1981 provincial | Mercier | United Social Credit | 118 | 0.40 | 6/8 | Gérald Godin, Parti Québécois |
| 1982 municipal | Montreal City Council, Laurier ward | Municipal Action Group | 527 | 9.95 | 3/3 | Robert Perreault, Montreal Citizens' Movement |
| 1984 federal | Laurier | Social Credit | 194 | 0.72 | 7/9 | David Berger, Liberal |
| 1985 provincial | Mercier | Independent | 97 | 0.38 | 7/10 | Gérald Godin, Parti Québécois |
| 1986 municipal | Mayor of Montreal | Independent | 1,676 | 0.49 | 5/7 | Jean Doré, Montreal Citizens' Movement |

=== Richelieu: Michel Guilbault ===
Michel Guilbault received 347 votes (1.13%), finishing fourth against Quebec Liberal Party candidate Albert Khelfa.
