= Natural Law Party of Quebec candidates in the 1994 Quebec provincial election =

The Natural Law Party of Quebec fielded 102 candidates in the 1994 provincial election, none of whom were elected. This page has information about these candidates.

== Electoral divisions ==
=== Fabre: Christian Rouvière ===
Christian Rouvière received 259 votes (0.65%), finishing fifth against Parti Québécois candidate Joseph Facal.

=== Labelle: Michel Turbide ===
Michel Turbide has a bachelor's degree in business administration. He was a chef for ten years and has long been active in the transcendental meditation movement. Turbide has written a book on aromatherapy and gives regular presentations on the subject. He received 340 votes (1.27%) in the 1994 election, finishing fourth against Parti Québécois incumbent Jacques Léonard.

=== Mercier: Marylise Baux ===
Marylise Baux was a Natural Law Party candidate at both the federal and provincial levels in the 1990s. She identified as a marketing agent in 1993.

Electoral record
Election	Division	Party	Votes	%	Place	Winner
1993 federal	Verdun—Saint-Paul	Natural Law	432	0.96	6/10	Raymond Lavigne, Liberal
1994 provincial	Mercier	Natural Law	259	0.83	6/9	Robert Perreault, Parti Québécois

=== Nicolet-Yamaska: Jacques Houde ===
Jacques Houde received 840 votes (3.14%), finishing third against Parti Québécois candidate Michel Morin.
