= Ministre responsable des Relations avec les communautés francophones et acadiennes =

Ministerial position in the government of Quebec

The Ministre responsable des Relations avec les communautés francophones et acadiennes (English: Minister responsible for Relations with francophone and Acadian communities) was a ministerial position in the government of Quebec during Bernard Landry's tenure as premier. Its purpose was to oversee Quebec's relations with francophone and Acadian communities in the rest of Canada.

Joseph Facal was appointed as the minister responsible for this position on March 8, 2001. He was succeeded by Jean-Pierre Charbonneau on January 30, 2002. Both ministers also served as minister of Canadian intergovernmental affairs in the Landry administration.

The position was discontinued when Jean Charest succeeded Bernard Landry as premier.

== See also ==
- Quebec nationalism
- Cabinet of Canada
- Acadians
