= Quebec Liberal Party candidates in the 1994 Quebec provincial election =

The governing Quebec Liberal Party fielded a full slate of 125 candidates in the 1994 Quebec general election and elected forty-seven candidates, falling to official opposition status in the National Assembly of Quebec.

== Candidates ==
=== Fabre: Lise Evoy ===
Lise Evoy received 16,570 votes (41.52%), finishing second against Parti Québécois candidate Joseph Facal. She previously served on the Commission scolaire de Chomedey-Laval.

=== Labelle: Marcel Lafleur ===
Marcel Lafleur received 8,494 votes (31.68%), finishing second against Parti Québécois incumbent Jacques Léonard.

=== Mercier: Alda Viero ===
Alda Viero was born in Italy and grew up in Montreal. A published poet, she was a travel agency operator in 1994 and campaigned in support of Canadian federalism. She received 9,479 votes (30.55%), finishing second against Parti Québécois candidate Robert Perreault.
