= Joseph Facal =

Canadian politician (born 1961)

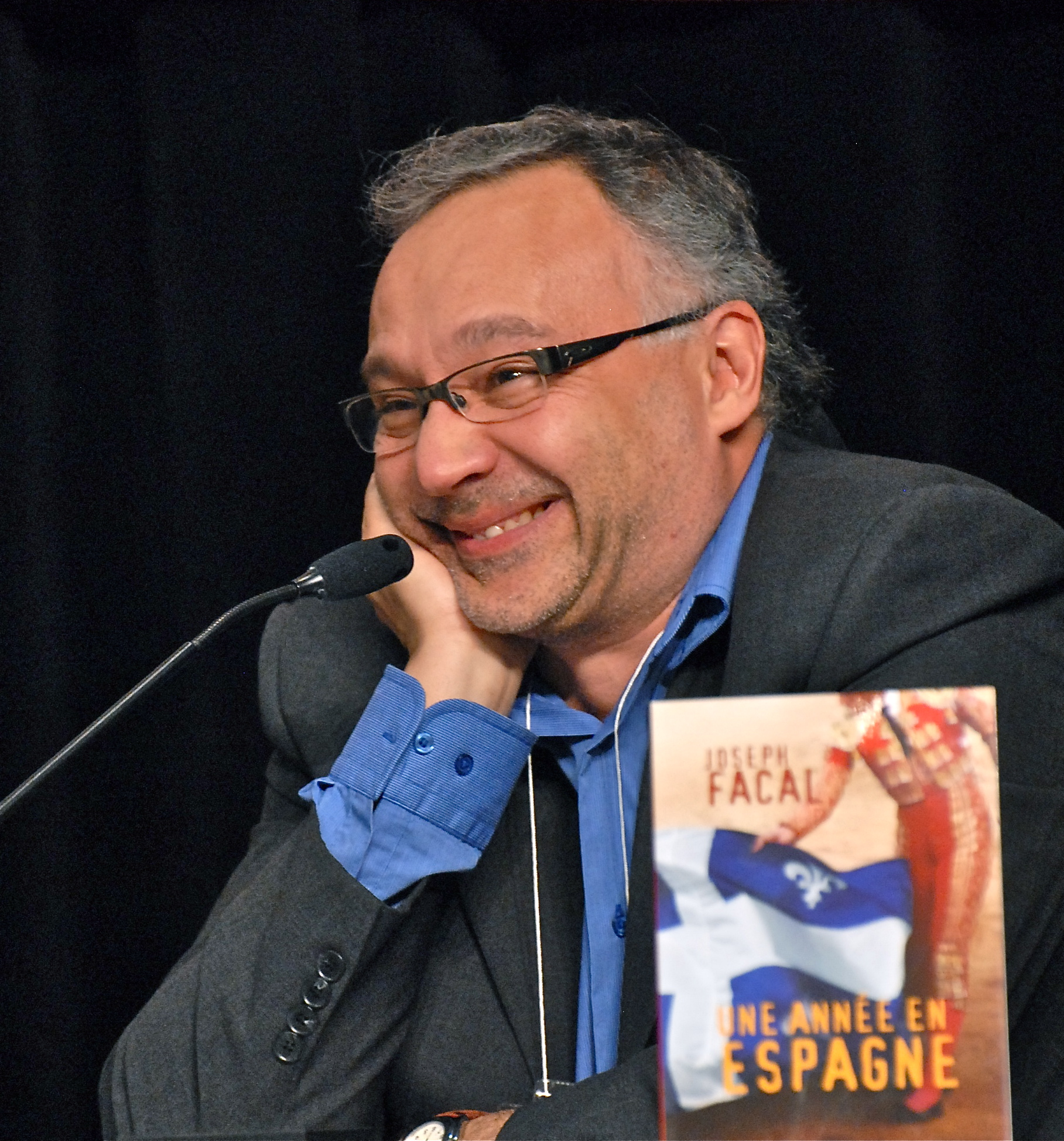
- Joseph Facal in 2011

President of the Treasury Board, Minister of state for Administration and the Public Service, and Minister responsible for Administration and the Public Service
- In office 30 January 2002 – 29 April 2003
- Preceded by: Sylvain Simard
- Succeeded by: Monique Jérôme-Forget

Minister of Citizenship and Immigration
- In office 8 March 2001 – 30 January 2002
- Preceded by: Sylvain Simard
- Succeeded by: Rémy Trudel

Minister of Canadian Intergovernmental Affairs Also styled as Minister responsible for relations with Francophone and Acadian Communities after 8 March 2001
- In office 23 September 1998 – 30 January 2002
- Preceded by: Jacques Brassard
- Succeeded by: Jean-Pierre Charbonneau

Minister responsible for the Outaouais
- In office 15 December 1998 – 8 March 2001
- Preceded by: Sylvain Simard
- Succeeded by: Sylvain Simard

Member of the National Assembly of Quebec for Fabre
- In office 1994–2003
- Preceded by: Jean-A. Joly
- Succeeded by: Michelle Courchesne

Personal details
- Born: 12 March 1961 (age 65) Montevideo, Uruguay
- Party: Parti Québécois
- Profession: journalist, author

Joseph Facal (born 12 March 1961) is a Canadian politician, academic, and journalist in the province of Quebec. He was a Parti Québécois member of the National Assembly of Quebec from 1994 to 2003 and was a cabinet minister in the governments of Lucien Bouchard and Bernard Landry.

== Early life and career ==
Facal was born in Montevideo, Uruguay, and moved with his family to Sherbrooke, Quebec, in 1970. His father, a surgeon with leftist political views, moved to Canada to escape Uruguay's political turmoil. Facal attended a bilingual French/Spanish school in Uruguay and was fluent in both languages before arriving in Quebec; he later became fluent in English. His sister, Carole Facal, is a noted singer-songwriter in Quebec.

Facal has a Bachelor of Arts degree in political science from Université du Québec à Montréal (1983), a Master of Arts degree in political science from the Université de Montréal (1986), and a Ph.D. in sociology from the Sorbonne (1993). He lectured at the Ecole des Hautes Etudes Commerciales de Montréal and Concordia University before starting his career as an elected official. He joined the Parti Québécois in 1980 and was the party's youth leader in 1990–91.

Shortly before his first election victory in 1994, Facal said that his support for Quebec sovereignty was based on economic issues. "Older sovereigntists tend to be driven more by the linguistic and cultural aspects of the debate," he said. "[Younger sovereigntists] are more driven by economic arguments, perhaps because nationalists of my generation have seen the slow and steady rise of French and feel less insecure. The language issue is really not what moves me."

== Politician ==
Facal first sought election to the Quebec legislature in the 1989 general election for the Montreal division of Dorion. He finished second against incumbent Liberal Party candidate Violette Trépanier, a minister in Robert Bourassa's government.

He was narrowly elected on his second attempt in the 1994 general election for the Laval division of Fabre. The Parti Québécois won a majority government under Jacques Parizeau's leadership, and Facal entered the legislative as a government backbencher. From December 1994 to March 1996 he chaired the assembly's commission de l'éducation. In 1995, he openly expressed scepticism about Premier Parizeau's strategy of holding a referendum on sovereignty during the Parti Québécois's first full year in government.

Lucien Bouchard succeeded Parizeau as Parti Québécois leader and premier of Quebec on 26 January 1996, and appointed Facal as his parliamentary secretary three days later. Facal subsequently represented the Bouchard government on missions to Africa, Europe, and Latin America, and in 1997 he served as vice-president of the Parliamentary Conference of the Americas held in Quebec City. In the same year, he chaired a legislative committee that recommended downsizing in the Quebec civil service and the number of government agencies.

=== Minister of Intergovernmental Affairs ===
==== Bouchard government ====
Facal was promoted to cabinet on 23 September 1998, as minister of Canadian intergovernmental affairs. He was re-elected with an increased majority in the 1998 general election, as the PQ won a second consecutive majority government under Bouchard's leadership. Facal recorded English-language and Spanish-language advertisements for his party during the campaign. He was kept in the intergovernmental affairs portfolio after the election and was also appointed as minister responsible for the Outaouais on 15 December 1998.

In 1998 and 1999, Facal took part in discussions with representatives of the Canadian federal government and other provinces on a proposed Social Union Framework Agreement for health, education, and social services. He indicated that Quebec would only accept the agreement if it recognized the province's right to opt out of specific programs with full financial compensation. The federal government ultimately concluded a deal with all provinces except Quebec in February 1999; Facal said that he could not sign the accord, as it included provisions for the federal government to oversee unilateral programs such as the millennium scholarships and did not permit Quebec to opt out of future shared-cost programs. He later said that the social union agreement undermined any possibility that Quebec's distinctiveness could be recognized within the Canadian constitution.

Facal was a vocal opponent of the Clarity Act introduced by Stéphane Dion, the minister of intergovernmental affairs in the federal government of Jean Chrétien. Dion's act was designed to clarify the terms and conditions under which the government of Canada would negotiate with a provincial government in the event of a successful referendum on sovereignty. Among other things, the act gave the House of Commons of Canada the right to determine if the referendum question and the popular mandate for sovereignty were sufficiently clear. Facal described the legislation as "anti-democratic" and exchanged public letters with Dion on the subject in late 1999.

Facal introduced counter-legislation to the Clarity Act in the Quebec legislature in December 1999. His legislation stated that a simple majority would be sufficient for a referendum victory on sovereignty, that Quebec's boundaries could not be changed except by Quebec's government and elected representatives, and that no other parliament or government could reduce the powers of the National Assembly. The Grand Council of the Crees initially opposed this legislation on the grounds that it denied aboriginal people the same right of self-determination that was claimed for Quebec. Facal responded that it was not his government's wish "to exercise any form of domination over the Crees" and revised the legislation to reflect this and other concerns. The revised version was approved by the National Assembly in December 2000, with Liberal legislators voting against it.

Facal expressed scepticism toward federal health minister Allan Rock's proposal to overhaul Canada's public health system in January 2000, saying that the effort was hypocritical after years of federal cutbacks.

==== Landry government ====
Lucien Bouchard announced his resignation as Parti Québécois leader and premier in January 2001, and Facal was one of the first PQ legislators to support Bernard Landry's successful bid to succeed him. When Landry became premier on 8 March 2001, he retained Facal as Canadian intergovernmental affairs minister and gave him additional responsibilities as minister of citizenship and immigration. He was also given ministerial responsibility for Canadian francophones and Acadians living outside Quebec, while giving up responsibility for the Outaouais to Sylvain Simard. The following month, Facal published a seventy-page book entitled Le declin du federalisme canadien.

In May 2001, Facal called on the Canadian government to give Quebec a greater role in citizenship ceremonies for new Canadians. He initially offered qualified support to the suggestion that Quebec should establish its own citizenship, but he later rejected it on the grounds that it was unnecessarily provocative and offered no concrete benefits.

In the aftermath of the September 11, 2001 attacks in New York City and Washington, D.C., Facal indicated that Quebec would tighten procedures for issuing documents such as birth certificates. He also expressed concern that Quebec immigrants of Arab origin would be unfairly associated with terrorism. "It's malicious and deplorable to insinuate there may be a terrorist lurking behind every Arab or Muslim", he said in response to a critical New York Times article. "I strongly denounce all such suggestions."

=== President of the Treasury Board ===
Landry shuffled his cabinet on 30 January 2002, and named Facal as president of the treasury board and minister of state for administration and the public service. While holding this portfolio, Facal emerged as a prominent voice on the right wing of the Parti Québécois.

Facal argued in June 2002 that the PQ should shift away from its social democratic origins. Speaking at a news conference, he described the PQ's platform as being in some respects outdated, called for the party to shift focus from its traditional grassroots allies to a more middle-class electorate, and said that the Quebec governance model had created high debt and undue dependence on the state. Premier Landry criticized Facal's remarks, defending his administration as "interventionist" with a mandate to ensure the province's wealth could be shared "between the regions, between the social classes, and between age groups." Despite this, Landry also defended Facal against accusations that he was too right-wing for the Parti Québécois, and Facal clarified that he had no intention of leaving the party. He was not disciplined and remained a member of cabinet.

During the same period, Facal also criticized Action démocratique du Québec leader Mario Dumont for arguing that Quebec should dramatically scale back its government services and end employment security in the civil service. "We have to modernize the state for reasons of efficiency but we must not dismantle it for ideological reasons," Facal said, dismissing Dumont's plan as a simplistic solution to a complicated problem. He also noted that job security guarantees had been put in place to prevent workers from being influenced by partisan politics, adding that workers could still be dismissed for a poor job performance.

In December 2002, Facal accepted a preliminary treasury board report that recommended a significant reduction in the size of cabinet and the elimination of several government agencies, some of which were described in the report as redundant.

Facal did not run as a candidate in the 2003 general election. He said that his decision was not based on ideological differences with Landry's government and added that he would "doubtlessly" return to politics in the future. The Parti Québécois was defeated by Jean Charest's Liberals in the election that followed, and Facal formally resigned from cabinet with rest of the Landry ministry on 29 April 2003. He later wrote for the Journal de Montréal and returned to teaching sociology and management at the Ecole des Hautes Etudes Commerciales de Montréal.

== Out of the legislature ==
=== PQ leadership politics ===
Bernard Landry faced criticisms over his leadership after the 2003 election, and in August 2004 Pauline Marois challenged him to hold a leadership contest. Facal supported this, saying that the party needed a leadership contest to update its platform.

Landry resigned as party leader in June 2005 after receiving only 76.2% support at a party convention. There were rumours that Facal would be a candidate in the leadership contest that followed, although he was not given strong odds of winning. He eventually decided to support Pauline Marois, who finished second to André Boisclair.

Boisclair resigned as party leader following a poor performance in the 2007 general election. Facal was again considered as possible leadership candidate, but he again chose not to run and was still generally regarded as an ally of Marois, who won the leadership on her third attempt. During this period, Facal worked with former cabinet colleague François Legault to propose a new PQ policy agenda focused on economic growth and the more gradual promotion of sovereignty.

=== Support for the lucide manifesto and shift away from the PQ ===
Facal was one of several public notables, also including Lucien Bouchard, who endorsed the manifesto Pour un Québec lucide in October 2005. The manifesto generally promoted conservative ideas such as increased privatization, though it also called for government re-investment in some areas. Its specific recommendations included debt reduction, a substantial increase to Quebec's electricity rates (reflecting what the signatories described as real market values), significant new financial support for education, a lifting of Quebec's long-standing tuition freeze, and a guaranteed minimum wage.

In late 2007, Facal was appointed to a commission established by the Charest government to examine public service fees in Quebec. The commission's report recommended higher electricity prices (with safeguards for low-income earners), an end to the province's university tuition freeze, and mandatory water meters to reduce wastage. Some journalists noted similarities between the report and the lucide manifesto. Monique Jérôme-Forget, the minister who commissioned the study, did not commit to following through with its proposals and specifically rejected the call for higher electricity rates.

Rumours circulated in late 2010 that Facal would join François Legault to launch a new right-of-centre political movement seeking to bypass Quebec's traditional dichotomy of federalism and sovereigntism. He ultimately decided not to do so, although he acknowledged in a November 2010 blog posting that he was no longer a member of any political party.

=== Federal Canadian politics ===
After leaving the Quebec legislature, Facal sometimes represented the Bloc Québécois on all-party panel discussions in Canada's English-language media. He was a strategist for the party in the 2006 federal election. He later criticized the BQ's decision to offer parliamentary support to a proposed coalition government of the Liberal Party of Canada and the New Democratic Party in late 2008, on the grounds that the coalition would be detrimental to sovereigntist interests. In the event, the coalition dissolved before it could assume office.

Facal identified Lester Pearson as Canada's greatest prime minister in September 2005, describing him as "a throwback to the good old days when there were still some English-speaking Canadians committed to understanding Quebec." Facal also praised Brian Mulroney, while describing Pierre Trudeau and Jean Chrétien as Canada's worst leaders.

=== Other political writings ===
Facal co-authored an article in 2005 criticizing Jean Charest's proposal to introduce a form of proportional representation to Quebec's electoral system. One argument raised in this piece was that the change would reduce the power of Quebec's francophone majority in relation to the predominantly anglophone areas in Montreal, where Liberal candidates are often elected with huge majorities.

Facal has criticized multiculturalist aspects of the Charest government's course in ethics and religious culture, which is taught to all students at the elementary and high school level.

His book, Quelque chose comme un grand peuple, was a best-seller in Quebec in 2010.

== Publications ==
- Facal, Joseph. L'école du public choice et la croissance de l'État [microforme] / par Joseph Facal. -- [Montréal : Service des archives, Université de Montréal, Section Microfilm], 1987. M.A. thesis.
- Facal, Joseph. Le déclin du fédéralisme canadien / Joseph Facal. -- Montréal : VLB éditeur, 2001. ISBN 2-89005-760-7
- Facal, Joseph. Changement social et transformations d'une identité collective : le cas des Québécois de l'après-guerre à aujourd'hui / par Joseph Facal. -- Montréal : HEC Montréal, Direction de la recherche, 2005.
- Facal, Joseph. Social policy and intergovernmental relations in Canada : understanding the failure of SUFA from a Quebec perspective / par Joseph Facal. -- Montréal : HEC Montréal, Direction de la recherche, 2005.
- Facal, Joseph. Social policy and intergovernmental relations in Canada : understanding the failure of SUFA from a Quebec perspective / Joseph Facal. -- Regina : Saskatchewan Institute of Public Policy, 2005. ISBN 0-7731-0522-0
- Facal, Joseph. Éléments introductifs pour une sociologie de l'État / par Joseph Facal. -- Montréal : HEC Montréal, Direction de la recherche, 2005.
- Facal, Joseph. La croissance des dépenses publiques dans les pays de l'OCDE : que valent les explications par les théories néo-institutionnelles du choix rationnel? / par Joseph Facal. -- Montréal : HEC Montréal, Direction de la recherche, 2006.
- Facal, Joseph Volonté politique et pouvoir médical : la naissance de l'assurance maladie au Québec et aux États-Unis / Joseph Facal. -- Montréal : Boréal, 2006. ISBN 978-2-7646-0471-7, ISBN 2-7646-0471-8
- Facal, Joseph Quelque chose comme un grand peuple / Joseph Facal. -- Montréal : Boréal, 2010. ISBN 978-2-7646-2000-7, ISBN 2-7646-2000-4
- Une année en Espagne, Montréal, VLB, 2011, 160 pages ISBN 978-2-89649-291-6

== Electoral record ==
1998 Quebec general election: Fabre
Party	Candidate	Votes	%	±%
Parti Québécois	Joseph Facal	19,859	45.95	+1.65
Liberal	Joanne Gauthier	17,507	40.51	−1.01
Action démocratique	Sylvain Lépine	5,696	13.18	+0.54
Socialist Democracy	Jean Célestin Pichon	156	0.36	
Total valid votes		43,218	100.00	
Rejected and declined votes		430		
Turnout		43,648	84.18	−2.37
Electors on the lists		51,851		

Source: Official Results, Le Directeur général des élections du Québec.

1994 Quebec general election: Fabre
Party	Candidate	Votes	%	±%
Parti Québécois	Joseph Facal	17,679	44.30	
Liberal	Lise Evoy	16,570	41.52	
Action démocratique	Lucie Jobin	5,043	12.64	
Green	Rick Blatter	359	0.90	–
Natural Law	Christian Rouvière	259	0.65	
Total valid votes		39,910	100.00	
Rejected and declined votes		681		
Turnout		40,591	86.55	
Electors on the lists		46,899		

Source: Official Results, Le Directeur général des élections du Québec.

1989 Quebec general election: Dorion
Party	Candidate	Votes	%
Liberal	Violette Trépanier	11,632	51.00
Parti Québécois	Joseph Facal	9,425	41.33
Green	Agnès Grimaud	878	3.85
New Democratic	Gaétan Nadeau	437	1.92
Lemon	Pierre Corbeil	297	1.30
Marxist–Leninist	Francine Tremblay	137	0.60
Total valid votes		22,806	100.00
Rejected and declined votes		421	
Turnout		23,227	76.03
Electors on the lists		30,551	
Source: Official Results, Le Directeur général des élections du Québec.

Source: Official Results, Le Directeur général des élections du Québec.
