= Blair Longley =

Canadian politician (born 1950)

Leader of the Marijuana Party
- In office December 13, 2004 – October 31, 2025
- Preceded by: Marc-Boris St-Maurice
- Succeeded by: Party dissolved

Chief Officer of the Marijuana Party
- In office 2019–2025
- Succeeded by: Party dissolved

Chief Agent of the Rhinoceros Party of Canada
- In office 1985–1987

Personal details
- Born: Blair Timmothy Longley; September 25, 1950 (age 76) Vancouver, British Columbia, Canada
- Party: Marijuana (2004–present)
- Other political affiliations: Bloc Pot (2003–2004); Independent (1987–2003); Rhinoceros Party (1985–1987); Green (1983–1985)

Blair Timmothy Longley (born September 25, 1950) is a Canadian politician and activist who served as the leader of the Marijuana Party from 2004 until the party's end in 2025.

== Early life ==
Blair Longley (born Allan Timmothy Peach) was born on September 25, 1950, in Vancouver, British Columbia, and grew up in North Vancouver.

In 1968, Longley murdered his father, stabbing him repeatedly in the chest in their family home in Dollarton, Vancouver. Due to his age of 17, and his mother claiming it was self defense, there were no actions taken and he was released. Longley shortly thereafter changed his name from Allan to Blair. Some years later, Longley published a novel named “Letters to Oedipus” in which he speaks about being in love with his mother and murdering his father.

== Career ==
Longley attended the founding meeting of the Green Party of Canada at Carleton University in November 1983. He went on to be an active member of the Rhinoceros Party of which he was an official agent from 1985 to 1987.

He joined the Marijuana Party shortly after its foundation and became the party's leader in 2004, following the resignation of Marc-Boris St-Maurice.

He has been a candidate for the House of Commons of Canada on four occasions, for three different parties. He ran for the Green Party in the 1984 election in the riding of Burnaby placing a distant fourth of four candidates with 364 of 58,991 votes. In 1988, he ran against opposition leader John Turner, with no party affiliation, and placed ninth of twelve candidates with 52 of 54,654 votes.

Longley ran for the Bloc Pot in the 2003 Quebec provincial election. He later ran for the Marijuana Party in the riding of North Okanagan—Shuswap in 2004 and placed fifth of eight candidates with 492 of 51,765 votes, then in 2008 in the riding of Hochelaga, Quebec, placing eighth of nine with 183 of 45,683 votes.

Following the legalization of cannabis in Canada, Longley said it was "going to be harder than ever now for the Marijuana Party to exist". Only four candidates ran for the Marijuana Party in the 2019 federal election. As of 2018 Longley was the Marijuana Party's chief agent and leader, and so was ineligible to run in federal elections. Since legalization, Longley shifted the Marijuana Party's message towards scrutinizing the "rapid capitalization" of the drug.

== Electoral record ==
2008 Canadian federal election: Hochelaga
Party	Candidate	Votes	%	±%	Expenditures
Bloc Québécois	Réal Ménard	22,720	49.73	−5.85	$28,893
Liberal	Diane Dicaire	9,442	20.67	+3.43	not listed
New Democratic	Jean-Claude Rocheleau	6,600	14.45	+5.54	$21,479
Conservative	Luc Labbé	4,201	9.20	−3.01	$8,586
Green	Philippe Larochelle	1,946	4.26	−0.60	not listed
neorhino.ca	Simon Landry	230	0.50	–	not listed
Communist	Marianne Breton Fontaine	184	0.40		$898
Marijuana	Blair T. Longley	183	0.40	−0.32	not listed
Marxist–Leninist	Christine Dandenault	177	0.39	−0.09	not listed
Total valid votes		45,683	100.00		
Total rejected, unmarked, and declined ballots		644			
Turnout		46,327	58.24	−0.07	
Eligible voters		79,542			
Sources: Official Results, Elections Canada and Financial Returns, Elections Canada.

2004 Canadian federal election: North Okanagan—Shuswap
Party	Candidate	Votes	%	±%	Expenditures
Conservative	Darrel Stinson	24,014	46.39%	–	$73,168
New Democratic	Alice Brown	12,528	24.20%	–	$36,696
Liberal	Will Hansma	11,636	22.47%	–	$51,772
Green	Erin Nelson	2,333	4.50%	–	$960
Marijuana	Blair Longley	492	0.95%	–	$400
Independent	Gordon Campbell	401	0.77%	–	
Canadian Action	Claire Foss	257	0.49%	–	$1,558
Independent	K. No. Daniels	104	0.20%	–	
Total valid votes		51,765	100.00%		
Total rejected ballots		174	0.34%		
Turnout		51,939			

Quebec provincial by-election, September 20, 2004: Nelligan
Party	Candidate	Votes	%	±%
Liberal	Yolande James	7,812	52.58	
Independent	Michel Gibson	4,038	27.18	
Parti Québécois	Sahar Hawili	1,538	10.35	
Action démocratique	Tom Pentefountas	1,039	6.99	
Green	Ryan Young	251	1.69	–
UFP	Josée Larouche	120	0.81	–
Bloc Pot	Blair Longley	58	0.39	
Total valid votes		14,856	100.00	
Rejected and declined votes		62		
Turnout		14,918	28.60	
Electors on the lists		52,163		
Sources: Official Results, Government of Quebec

2003 Quebec general election: D'Arcy-McGee
Party	Candidate	Votes	%	±%
Liberal	Lawrence Bergman	23,968	91.29	+0.68
Parti Québécois	Mathieu Breault	1,087	4.14	+1.02
Action démocratique	Sylvain James Bowes	520	1.98	+0.73
Equality	William F. Shaw	406	1.55	-2.81
Bloc Pot	Blair T. Longley	274	1.04	–

1988 Canadian federal election: Vancouver Quadra
Party	Candidate	Votes
Liberal	John Turner	24,021
Progressive Conservative	Bill Clarke	16,664
New Democratic	Gerry Scott	11,687
Reform	J.R. Jack Ford	1,112
Rhinoceros	John Turner (no relation)	760
Libertarian	Walter Boytinck	129
Communist	Bert Ogden	75
Independent	Albert A. Ritchie	74
Independent	Blair T. Longley	52
Confederation of Regions	Nora Galenzoski	35
Commonwealth of Canada	G.J. Joseph Jackman	23
Independent	Allen Soroka	22

1984 Canadian federal election
Party	Candidate	Votes
New Democratic	Svend Robinson	28,318
Progressive Conservative	Bill Langas	20,697
Liberal	Mike Hillman	9,612
Green	Blair T. Longley	364

== See also ==
- 2008 Canadian federal election

Preceded by Marc-Boris St-Maurice	Marijuana Party of Canada leaders 2004-present	Succeeded by incumbent
