= Green Party of Quebec candidates in the 1994 Quebec provincial election =

The Green Party of Quebec fielded eleven candidates in the 1994 Quebec general election, none of whom were elected.

== Candidates ==
=== Fabre: Rick Blatter ===
Rick Blatter was a Libertarian Party candidate in two federal elections during the 1990s. He ran provincially as a Green Party candidate in 1994 and has run for mayor of Laval on two occasions. In 1996, he wrote a public letter in support of a flat tax. Blatter was a vocal opponent of former Laval mayor Gilles Vaillancourt and had criticized the state of democracy in the city.

Electoral record
| Election | Division | Party | Votes | % | Place | Winner |
|---|---|---|---|---|---|---|
| 1993 federal | Laval West | Libertarian | 649 | 1.05 | 5/9 | Michel Dupuy, Liberal |
| 1993 municipal | Mayor of Laval | Independent | 1,087 | 0.96 | 4/4 | Gilles Vaillancourt, PRO Laval |
| 1994 provincial | Fabre | Green | 359 | 0.90 | 4/5 | Joseph Facal, Parti Québécois |
| federal by-election, 13 February 1995 | Saint-Henri—Westmount | Libertarian | 64 | 0.38 | 7/9 | Lucienne Robillard, Liberal |
| 2009 municipal | Mayor of Laval | Independent | 482 | 0.49 | 5/5 | Gilles Vaillancourt, Parti PRO des Lavallois |

=== Mercier: Jean-François Labadie ===
Jean-François Labadie received 865 votes (2.79%), finishing fourth against Parti Québécois candidate Robert Perreault.
