= Robert Perreault =

Canadian politician

Director-General of the Conseil regional de l'environnement de Montreal
- In office 2001–2007
- Succeeded by: André Porlier

Minister of Citizenship and Immigration (Quebec)
- In office 1998–2000
- Preceded by: André Boisclair
- Succeeded by: Sylvain Simard

Minister responsible for the Montreal region (Quebec)
- In office 1997–1998
- Preceded by: Serge Ménard
- Succeeded by: Louise Harel

Minister of Public Security (Quebec)
- In office 1996–1997
- Preceded by: Serge Ménard
- Succeeded by: Pierre Bélanger

Member of the National Assembly of Quebec for Mercier
- In office 1994–2000
- Preceded by: Gérald Godin
- Succeeded by: Nathalie Rochefort

Chair of the Montreal Urban Community Transit Corp.
- In office 1986–1994
- Preceded by: Yves Ryan
- Succeeded by: Ginette L'Heureux (interim), then Yves Ryan

Vice-Chair of the Montreal Executive Committee
- In office 1986–1990
- Preceded by: Pierre Lorange
- Succeeded by: John Gardiner

Member of the Montreal Executive Committee responsible for economic development and administrative reform
- In office 1986–1990
- Succeeded by: John Gardiner (economic development)

Montreal City Councillor for Laurier Ward
- In office 1982–1994
- Preceded by: Roger Larivée
- Succeeded by: Louise Roy

Personal details
- Born: 13 May 1947 (age 78) Sainte-Anne-de-la-Pérade, Quebec
- Party: Parti Québécois

Robert Perreault (born 13 May 1947) is a Canadian politician and administrator in the province of Quebec. He was a prominent city councillor in Montreal from 1982 to 1994, a Parti Québécois member of the National Assembly of Quebec from 1994 to 2000, and a cabinet minister in the government of Lucien Bouchard.

== Early life and career ==
Perreault was born in Sainte-Anne-de-la-Pérade, Quebec. He earned a Bachelor of Arts degree from the Université de Montréal in 1968 and later studied economics at the same institution. From 1975 to 1983, he was an administrator for cultural, sports, and recreation organizations in Quebec.

== City councillor ==
1982–1986

Perreault was a member of the progressive Montreal Citizens' Movement (MCM) in municipal politics. He was first elected to the Montreal city council in the 1982 municipal election, defeating incumbent councillor Roger Larivée from mayor Jean Drapeau's Civic Party in the east-end Laurier ward. The Civic Party won a majority government on council in this election, and Perreault served in opposition for the next four years, achieving prominence as the MCM's critic on economic issues. In 1985, he joined with party leader Jean Doré to propose an industry surtax to fund Montreal's public transit. He later suggested that an "enterprise zone" be created for economically depressed areas in Montreal's east end.

1986–1990

Jean Doré was elected as mayor of Montreal in the 1986 municipal election and the MCM won a landslide victory on council. Perreault was easily re-elected in Laurier and, following the election, was named as vice-chair of the Montreal executive committee (i.e., the municipal cabinet) with responsibility for economic development and administrative reform.

Perreault introduced significant reforms to Montreal's civil service in early 1987 in a bid to decentralize the city's operations. Almost half of the city's department directorships were eliminated (with many directors taking early retirement), and twelve new municipal centers were opened in different neighbourhoods across the city. In the same year, Perreault introduced a ninety million dollar five-year investment plan for Montreal's east end; he indicated the plan would protect eleven thousand existing jobs, create four thousand more, and bring $350 million in investment from the private sector. In 1990, he introduced a similar plan valued at one hundred million dollars for economically depressed areas in southwest Montreal.

Perreault also served as a city representative on the regional Montreal Urban Community and was appointed as chair of the Montreal Urban Community Transit Corp. (MUCTC) in November 1986. Soon after his appointment, he announced a one-year fare freeze and a small tax increase for suburban Montreal homeowners that was targeted to transportation. In 1988, he wrote a public letter calling for municipalities in Laval and the South Shore to contribute more to Montreal's transit system, arguing that the service was used by many of residents of these communities.

1990–1994

The MCM won another landslide victory in the 1990 municipal election. Perreault was not re-appointed to the city's executive committee, but remained chair of the MUCTC.

The Quebec government introduced significant cuts to Montreal municipal transit in 1991, amid a serious North American economic downturn. The MUCTC made up for these cuts by increasing municipal contributions, increasing fares, and laying off some employees. At the end of the year, it posted a surprising $13.3 million surplus, and some transit advocates complained that the fare increases approved by Perreault had been excessive.

Perreault announced in November 1993 that public transit ridership had increased after five years of decline, notwithstanding the continuing economic downturn. The MUCTC posted another $14 million surplus in early 1994.

MCM divisions and national politics

Perreault was on the Quebec nationalist wing of the MCM. In the 1980s, he dissented against the party's call to reform Quebec's Charter of the French Language. He announced his support for the newly formed Bloc Québécois in 1990 and called for a referendum on Quebec sovereignty the following year.

In December 1990, Perreault announced that the MUCTC would remove the government of Canada's English/French bilingual advertisements from bus and subway lines to ensure compliance with Quebec's French-only sign laws. Critics noted that this would result in about $800,000 in lost revenue over the next year. Perreault dropped the plan after being advised that the advertisements were legal under Canada's Official Languages Act.

Perreault wrote an editorial for the newspaper La Presse in August 1992, accusing the MCM of having lost credibility with the electorate. This was regarded as a serious indicator of dissent within Doré's party.

== Provincial legislator ==
Perreault sought the Parti Québécois nomination for the east-end Montreal division of Mercier in the buildup to the 1994 provincial election. He initially lost to lawyer Giuseppe Sciortino, but this result was later annulled due to voting irregularities, and Perreault defeated Sciortino in a follow-up contest. Party leader Jacques Parizeau had supported Sciortino's candidacy as a means of building the PQs support in Montreal's Italian community, and several senior party officials unsuccessfully pressured Perreault to drop out. (There were also ideological differences between the candidates; Perreault was considered a centrist, and Sciortino was closer to the PQ's left wing.) Despite the nomination controversy, Perreault was elected without difficulty in the 1994 election. The PQ won a majority government under Parizeau's leadership, and Perreault entered the legislature as a governmental backbencher.

Minister of public security

Lucien Bouchard succeeded Jacques Parizeau as premier on 29 January 1996, and appointed Perreault to cabinet as minister of public security. Perreault's department announced a series of prison reforms shortly thereafter, including plans to close as many as six prisons and incarcerate fewer non-violent criminals.

In late April 1996, Perreault worked with security officials in the Kahnawake Mohawk reserve to prevent a mixed martial arts event from taking place in the community; the government's position was that these events were too brutal to sanction. Later in the same year, Perreault's department took part in a jurisdictional controversy over a small casino in Kahnawake that was not sanctioned by the provincial government. In late 1996, Perreault reached an interim agreement with representatives of the government of Canada and the Mohawk Council of Kanesatake concerning policing services in the divided community.

Perreault announced an independent inquiry into the state of the Sûreté du Québec (SQ) in June 1996, following widespread allegations of corruption and misconduct in the force. This followed an embarrassing situation in which a high-profile drug case was dismissed due to evidence tampering. The inquiry, initially led by chief justice Jean-Pierre Bonin of the Court of Quebec's criminal division, was closed to the public. Bonin stood down in October 1996, citing acrimonious working conditions, and Perreault subsequently launched a revised, wide-ranging public inquiry led by retired justice Lawrence Poitras. In the same period, Perreault appointed senior public servant Guy Coulombe as the SQ's first civilian leader. When it was released three years later, Poitras's report accused the SQ of abusing its powers of arrest, being more concerned with protecting its image than investigating misconduct, and having an "unhealthy air of solidarity, expressed through the law of silence and retaliations" against dissident officers.

Perreault was public security minister at the time of a high-profile rivalry between two biker gangs in Quebec, the Hells Angels and the Rock Machine. In early 1997, he announced that the Bouchard government was planning a new series of measures to target gang violence, including stricter rules for liquor-permit renewals and increased expropriation powers for municipalities. He also sought legislative assistance from the federal government of Canada.

Minister responsible for Montreal

Bouchard announced a cabinet shuffle on 25 August 1997, and named Perreault as the minister responsible for the Montreal region. Perreault announced a few weeks later that the Quebec government would contribute $160 million to double the size of the Palais des congrès de Montréal, and a modified version of this plan was approved in September 1998.

In early 1998, Perreault helped negotiate an agreement for the provincial government to reduce Montreal's deficit by taking part ownership of some municipal buildings. He later announced significant funding initiatives for tourism, new bicycle lanes, and a new economic initiative for the city's east end.

Perreault proposed a transit corporation merger between the Montreal Urban Community, Laval, and the South Shore in 1998, arguing that it would save fifty million dollars per year. The initiative was set aside after complaints by Montreal-area mayors. Perreault also proposed a gasoline surtax and an increased vehicle registration fee to support public transit.

During the buildup to the 1998 election, Perreault was challenged by well-known journalist Josée Legault for the Parti Québécois nomination in Mercier. Legault accused the PQ of abandoning its commitment to social democracy and Quebec independence. Perreault won the challenge with about sixty per cent support.

In June 1999, after he was shuffled out of ministerial responsibility for Montreal, Perreault accused Mayor Pierre Bourque of governing the city in an undemocratic fashion.

Minister of immigration and citizenship

Perreault was re-elected in the 1998 provincial election, as the Parti Québécois won a second consecutive majority government under Lucien Bouchard's leadership. On 15 December, Bouchard reassigned Perreault as Quebec's minister of citizenship and immigration.

In March 1999, Perreault said that Quebec would not provide individual compensation to the Duplessis Orphans who had been abused several decades earlier at the Mount Cashel Orphanage. This decision was criticized by the provincial ombudsman. The government had previously made three million dollars available through an assistance fund, which Perreault said was meant for social services such as counselling. In 2000, he was quoted as saying on the matter, "There will not be compensation. We prefer to help those who most need the help now."

Perreault and treasury board president Jacques Léonard announced a new hiring campaign for the civil service in early 1999, indicating that they would seek more recruits from Quebec's minority communities. Perreault was later able to announce that Quebec had fulfilled its targets for minority representation in summer positions, but critics charged that the numbers for full-time civil service jobs remained unacceptably low. The government later strengthened its employment equity policies to ensure that more women, indigenous persons, and members of visible minority communities would be hired.

Perreault argued in June 1999 that Quebec would require independence to have proper oversight of its immigration policy, noting that the Canadian federal government was responsible for half of all immigration to the province. In the same year, he said that Quebec wanted to increase its francophone immigration from 44 per cent to about 60 per cent. Perreault helped oversee a high-profile resettlement of refugees from Kosovo in this period.

In May 2000, Perreault introduced legislation to create a "national identity card" for Quebec. He noted that the card was not mandatory and would include no information beyond the citizen's name and picture. Critics accused the Bouchard government of using the card to promote sovereignty and charged that it was the first step toward creating mandatory voting cards.

Perreault resigned from cabinet and the legislature on 6 October 2000, saying that his decision was personal and that he wanted to reorient his career. He added that he had entered provincial politics to achieve Quebec independence and would not have resigned if the Bouchard government had set a clear timeline for a new referendum on sovereignty.

Canadian federal politics

Perreault supported Gilles Duceppe's successful bid to lead the Bloc Québécois (BQ) in 1997.

== Administrator ==
Perreault became director general of the Conseil regional de l'environnement de Montreal in May 2001 and held the position until 2007. In this capacity, he continued to speak in favour of public transit. He also opposed an extension of the Quebec Autoroute 25 north of Montreal, citing pollution concerns. He criticized Quebec's transport department in 2006, calling it "incompetent" and saying that it was unduly focused on car use.

Perreault supported an increase to Montreal's parking meter rates in 2007, arguing that it was a necessary step to discourage automobile use. He also spoke in support of toll roads.

In the 2008 provincial election, Perreault supported Québec solidaire candidate Amir Khadir against PQ incumbent Daniel Turp in Mercier. Khadir was elected as Québec solidaire's first member of the provincial legislature.

== Electoral record ==
1998 Quebec general election: Mercier
Party	Candidate	Votes	%	±%
Parti Québécois	Robert Perreault	17,552	55.38	−1.10
Liberal	Elizabeth da Silva	9,005	28.42	−2.13
Action démocratique	Paul Benevides	2,818	8.89	+3.47
Bloc Pot	Marc St-Maurice	985	3.11	
Socialist Democracy	Guylaine Sirard	873	2.75	+0.12
Independent	Ann Farrell	158	0.50	
Natural Law	Pierre Bergeron	154	0.49	−0.34
Marxist–Leninist	Normand Chouinard	79	0.25	−0.08
Communist	Pierre Smith	67	0.21	−0.21
Total valid votes		31,691	100,00	
Total rejected ballots		493	1,53	
Turnout		32,184	75.28	
Eligible voters		42,755		
Parti Québécois hold		Swing		+0.52
Source: Official Results, Le Directeur général des élections du Québec.

1994 Quebec general election: Mercier
Party	Candidate	Votes	%	±%
Parti Québécois	Robert Perreault	17,523	56.48	−0.67
Liberal	Alda Viero	9,479	30.55	+0.13
Action démocratique	Carole Boucher	1,681	5.42	–
Green	Jean-François Labadie	865	2.79	−5.59
New Democratic	Renée-Claude Lorimier	815	2.63	+0.21
Natural Law	Marylise Baux	259	0.83	-
Commonwealth of Canada	Julie Laliberté	173	0.56	-
Communist	Ginette Gauthier	129	0.42	–
Marxist–Leninist	Hélène Héroux	102	0.33	−0.13
Total valid votes		31,026	100.00	
Rejected and declined votes		815		
Turnout		31,841	80.33	
Electors on the lists		39,636		
Source: Official Results, Le Directeur général des élections du Québec.

1990 Montreal municipal election: Councillor, Laurier
Party	Candidate	Votes	%
Montreal Citizens' Movement	Robert Perreault (incumbent)	2,452	59.07
Civic Party of Montreal	Paul-Emile Patry	559	13.47
Municipal Party	Normand Vachon	507	12.21
Ecology Montreal	Robert Silverman	380	9.15
White Elephant Party	Yves Gagne co-listed with Michel Bédard	169	4.07
Independent	Micheline Dandonneau	84	2.02
Total valid votes		4,151	100
Source: Election results, 1833-2005 (in French), City of Montreal.

1986 Montreal municipal election: Councillor, Laurier
Party	Candidate	Votes	%
Montreal Citizens' Movement	Robert Perreault (incumbent)	3,701	70.67
Civic Party of Montreal	Gilles Lupien	1,137	21.71
Independent	Roger Larivée	399	7.62
Total valid votes		5,237	100
Source: Election results, 1833-2005 (in French), City of Montreal.

1982 Montreal municipal election: Councillor, Laurier
Party	Candidate	Votes	%
Montreal Citizens' Movement	Robert Perreault	2,635	49.73
Civic Party of Montreal	Roger Larivée (incumbent)	2,137	40.33
Municipal Action Group	Gilles Côté	527	9.95
Total valid votes		5,299	100
Source: Election results, 1833-2005 (in French), City of Montreal.
