= Action démocratique du Québec candidates in the 1998 Quebec provincial election =

The Action démocratique du Québec party (ADQ) fielded a full slate of 125 candidates in the 1998 Quebec provincial election. One candidate, party leader Mario Dumont, was elected to the National Assembly. Information about other candidates may be found here.

== Candidates ==
=== Brome—Missisquoi: Eric Larivière ===
Eric Larivière received 3,599 votes (11.35%), finishing third against Liberal Party incumbent Pierre Paradis.

=== Fabre: Sylvain Lépine ===
Sylvain Lépine received 5,696 votes (13.18%), finishing third against incumbent Parti Québécois cabinet minister Joseph Facal.

=== Labelle: Pierre Gauthier ===
Pierre Gauthier received 2,781 votes (9.57%), finishing third against incumbent Parti Québécois cabinet minister Jacques Léonard.

=== Mercier: Paul Benevides ===
Paul Benevides received 2,818 votes (8.89%), finishing third against incumbent Parti Québécois cabinet minister Robert Perreault.

=== Richelieu: Patrick Gauthier ===
Patrick Gauthier received 4,543 votes (14.42%), finishing third against incumbent Parti Québécois cabinet minister Sylvain Simard. Simard and Gauthier later became political allies; in 2001, Simard announced that Gauthier would work with him on matters relating to regional development. Gauthier was later the communications agent for Bas-Richelieu—Nicolet—Bécancour Conservative Party candidate Réjean Bériault in the 2008 Canadian federal election. The following year, he supported Christian Lévesque's bid to succeed Mario Dumont as ADQ leader.
