= Communist Party of Canada candidates in the 2000 Canadian federal election =

The Communist Party of Canada (CPC) fielded a number of candidates in the 2000 Canadian federal election, none of whom were elected. Information about these candidates may be found here.

== Quebec ==
=== Outremont: Pierre Smith ===
Pierre Smith has been a candidate of the Communist Party of Canada and the Communist Party of Quebec. He identified as a cafeteria employee in 2000.

Electoral record
Election	Division	Party	Votes	%	Place	Winner
1998 provincial	Mercier	Communist	67	0.21	9/9	Robert Perreault, Parti Québécois
2000 federal	Outremont	Communist	118	0.30	9/9	Martin Cauchon, Liberal

== Ontario ==
=== Scarborough Southwest: Dora Stewart ===
Stewart lived in Cobourg, Ontario at the time of the election, and listed herself as retired. As of 2005, she lives in Peachland, British Columbia. Stewart has been active with the Council of Canadians and the anti–Iraq War movement. In 2002, she spoke out against the privatization of health care in British Columbia. She lives with William Stewart, formerly the leader of the Communist Party of Canada (Ontario).

She received 165 votes (0.46%), finishing sixth against Liberal incumbent Tom Wappel.

=== Sudbury: Daryl Janet Shandro ===
Shandro was born in Halifax, Nova Scotia. She holds a Bachelor of Arts degree in political science, and a Master of Arts degree in humanities. A social activist, she has served on a number of anti-poverty boards in Sudbury. In 1999, she wrote a letter opposing a one-tier regional government. During the 2000 campaign, she criticized Sudbury Mayor Jim Gordon's efforts to have the city declared a "free trade zone", arguing that similar measures had caused economic ruin in South America. She received 98 votes (0.28%), finishing seventh against Liberal incumbent Diane Marleau.

Shandro was a prominent member of Sudbury¹s War Resisters Support Campaign in 2008, which fights for the right of Iraq War deserters from the United States of America to remain in Canada.

== Manitoba ==
=== Winnipeg Centre: Harold James Dyck ===
Dyck is a veteran anti-poverty activist and advocate in Winnipeg, Manitoba. He campaigned for the Communist Party of Canada, the provincial Communist Party of Canada (Manitoba), and the municipal Labour Election Committee. He has played a prominent role in Winnipeg-based anti-poverty organizations such as the Manitoba Committee for Economic Justice (Broadcast News, 9 August 2000), the Social Planning Council of Winnipeg (Broadcast News, 10 January 2001), the Low Income Intermediary Project and the National Anti-Poverty Organization. In 1997, he was listed as a provincial committee member of the Communist Party of Canada (Winnipeg Free Press, 27 May).

Dyck was a youth activist during the 1970s, and identified wage issues as his primary concern in the 1977 provincial election (Canadian Tribune, 26 September 1977). He later became a worker with Boeing Winnipeg, and organized a unionization drive in 1980. He subsequently lost his job, and a newspaper article published in 2001 identified him as a welfare recipient (Winnipeg Free Press, 11 January 2001).

Dyck participated in a protest against basic local rate increases by Manitoba Telecom Services in 2000–01, arguing that the changes would prevent some persons on social assistance from owning their own telephones. Later in 2001, he called for protection for low-income earners against "sudden fluctuations in essential commodities like natural gas" (WFP, 19 September 2001). He has also argued that bank user fees are disproportionately punitive against the poor (WFP, 12 January 2005), and has criticized Payday loan services for "victimiz[ing] people in the most desperate of circumstances" (WFP, 30 May 2005). In 2005, he argued against proposed restrictions on panhandling.

Electoral record
Election	Division	Party	Votes	%	Place	Winner
1974 federal	Winnipeg South	Communist	79		7/7	James Richardson, Liberal
1977 provincial	Point Douglas	Communist	62	1.26	4/5	Donald Malinowski, New Democratic Party
1979 federal	Winnipeg—Birds Hill	Communist	62	0.12	4/5	Bill Blaikie, New Democratic Party
1986 provincial	Seven Oaks	Communist	65		4/4	Eugene Kostyra, New Democratic Party
1986 municipal	Redboine	LEC	496		3/4	Magnus Elleson, New Democratic Party
1999 provincial	Minto	Communist	45		4/5	MaryAnn Mihychuk, New Democratic Party
2000 federal	Winnipeg Centre	Communist	134	0.49	6/6	Pat Martin, New Democratic Party

Note: The 1986 municipal results are taken from the Winnipeg Free Press.

=== Winnipeg South Centre: David Allison ===
Allison listed himself as retired at the time of the 2000 election. He had previously campaigned for the Communist Party of Canada (Manitoba) in the 1999 provincial election, and received 133 votes in Wolseley for a fourth-place finish. The winner was Jean Friesen of the New Democratic Party.

He received 181 votes (0.48%) in the 2000 election, finishing last in a field of seven candidates. The winner was Anita Neville of the Liberal Party.

=== Winnipeg—Transcona: James Edward Hogaboam ===
Hogaboam was born on January 7, 1965, in La Mesa, California, United States. He and his parents, who were born in Manitoba, returned to Winnipeg in 1966. He has a broadcasting and journalism degree from Lethbridge Community College. He and a fellow student created the Lethbridge Kodiaks hockey team in 1992, and attempted to launch an open challenge for the Stanley Cup when National Hockey League play was stopped due to a labour dispute. A trustee for the Stanley Cup rejected their request, indicating that the trophy has had an exclusive arrangement with the NHL since 1947.

Hogaboam formed the Leland-Ashdown Rescue Committee in the 1990s, and worked to save historical buildings within Winnipeg. He wrote an article for People's Voice in 2000, accusing rocker Ted Nugent of hate speech after Nugent reportedly told a Winnipeg audience, "if you don't know how to speak f...ing English, you don't believe in Canada."

Hogaboam has campaigned for the federal Communist Party and the provincial Communist Party of Canada of Manitoba. He worked for a courier company during the 1999 election, and was quoted as saying, "The biggest misconception is that we're some kind of dictatorial party out to control people. We just support working people, a system where everyone participates."

Electoral record
Election	Division	Party	Votes	%	Place	Winner
1999 provincial	Elmwood	Communist	79	0.96	4/4	Jim Maloway, New Democratic Party
2000 federal	Winnipeg—Transcona	Communist	87	0.27	8/8	Bill Blaikie, New Democratic Party
