= Nathalie Rochefort =

Canadian politician

MNA for Mercier
- In office 2001–2003
- Preceded by: Robert Perreault
- Succeeded by: Daniel Turp

Personal details
- Born: 1970 (age 55–56) Quebec City, Quebec
- Party: Liberal

Nathalie Rochefort is a Canadian politician, who represented the electoral district of Mercier in the National Assembly of Quebec from 2001 to 2003.

A member of the Quebec Liberal Party, she was elected in a by-election on April 9, 2001, following the resignation of Robert Perreault. She was defeated by Daniel Turp of the Parti Québécois in the 2003 election. She ran again in the 2007 election, but was not re-elected.

Rochefort is also a long-time member of the federal New Democratic Party (the Quebec Liberal Party is not affiliated with the Liberal Party of Canada). She endorsed Brian Topp for the leader of the party in 2012. Rochefort subsequently joined the federal Liberal Party ahead of the 2019 election, and unsuccessfully ran as the party's candidate in Bécancour—Nicolet—Saurel in 2019 and 2021.

== Electoral record ==
=== Federal results ===
2021 Canadian federal election: Bécancour—Nicolet—Saurel
Party	Candidate	Votes	%	±%	Expenditures
Bloc Québécois	Louis Plamondon	27,403	54.80	-1.86	$65,506.85
Liberal	Nathalie Rochefort	8,451	16.90	-0.93	none listed
Conservative	Yanick Caisse	8,404	16.81	+0.69	$0.00
New Democratic	Catherine Gauvin	2,550	5.10	-0.12	$24.38
Free	André Blanchette	1,215	2.43	–	$635.50
People's	Eric Pettersen	1,214	2.43	+1.49	$814.69
Green	David Turcotte	770	1.54	-1.70	$0.00
Total valid votes/expense limit		50,007	97.89	–	$110,921.16
Total rejected ballots		1,080	2.11		
Turnout		51,087	63.40	-4.80	
Registered voters		80,573			
Bloc Québécois hold		Swing		-0.46	
Source: Elections Canada

2019 Canadian federal election: Bécancour—Nicolet—Saurel
Party	Candidate	Votes	%	±%	Expenditures
Bloc Québécois	Louis Plamondon	29,653	56.66	+16.68	$45,011.99
Liberal	Nathalie Rochefort	9,332	17.83	-6.43	none listed
Conservative	Pierre-André Émond	8,434	16.11	+4.7	none listed
New Democratic	Carole Lennard	2,732	5.22	-16.87	$0.10
Green	David Turcotte	1,697	3.24	+0.98	$0.00
People's	Richard Synnott	489	0.93	–	none listed
Total valid votes/expense limit		52,337	98.05		
Total rejected ballots		1,042	1.95	+0.15	
Turnout		53,379	67.30	-0.33	
Eligible voters		79,314			
Bloc Québécois hold		Swing		+11.56	
Source: Elections Canada

1993 Canadian federal election: Saint-Bruno—Saint-Hubert
Party	Candidate	Votes	%	Expenditures
Bloc Québécois	Pierrette Venne	34,959	56.90	$35,450
Liberal	Angéline Fournier	19,615	31.92	$61,363
Progressive Conservative	Jean Lesage	4,520	7.36	$20,526
New Democratic	Nathalie Rochefort	903	1.47	$0
Natural Law	Jean Cerigo	868	1.41	$0
National	Claude Alain	339	0.55	$1,581
Commonwealth of Canada	Bruno Lipke	240	0.39	$0
Total valid votes		61,444	100.00	
Total rejected ballots		2,495		
Turnout		63,939	81.54	
Electors on the lists		78,418		
Source: Thirty-fifth General Election, 1993: Official Voting Results, Published by the Chief Electoral Officer of Canada. Financial figures taken from official contributions and expenses provided by Elections Canada.

=== Provincial results ===
2007 Quebec general election: Mercier
Party	Candidate	Votes	%	±%
Parti Québécois	Daniel Turp	9,426	33.35	−11.91
Québec solidaire	Amir Khadir	8,303	29.38	+11.46
Liberal	Nathalie Rochefort	5,601	19.82	−8.74
Green	Sylvain Valiquette	2,398	8.48	–
Action démocratique	Gabriel Tupula Yamba	2,381	8.42	+2.12
Bloc Pot	Nicky Tanguay	156	0.55	−1.42
Total valid votes		28,265	99.17	
Total rejected ballots		237	0.83	
Turnout		28,502	69.32	
Electors on the lists		41,115		
Source: Official Results, Le Directeur général des élections du Québec.

2003 Quebec general election: Mercier
Party	Candidate	Votes	%	±%
Parti Québécois	Daniel Turp	13,334	45.26	+16.64
Liberal	Nathalie Rochefort	8,414	28.56	−6.10
UFP	Amir Khadir	5,278	17.92	-
Action démocratique	Vivian Goulder	1,855	6.30	+0.03
Bloc Pot	Lyne Rivard	579	1.97	−3.21
Total valid votes		29,460	100,00	
Parti Québécois gain from Liberal		Swing		+11.37
Source: Official Results, Le Directeur général des élections du Québec.

Quebec provincial by-election, April 9, 2001: Mercier
Party	Candidate	Votes	%	±%
Liberal	Nathalie Rochefort	5,953	34.66	+6.24
Parti Québécois	Claudel Toussaint	4,915	28.62	−26.76
Independent	Paul Cliche	4,163	24.24	-
Action démocratique	André Larocque	1,077	6.27	−2.62
Bloc Pot	Pierre Audette	890	5.18	+2.07
No designation	Man Yee Cheung	67	0.39	-
Independent	Charles Robidoux	50	0.29	-
No designation	Michel Prairie	32	0.19	-
Independent	Régent Millette	27	0.16	-
Total valid votes		17,174	100,00	
Total rejected ballots		352	2,01	
Turnout		17,526	41.09	
Eligible voters		42,651		
Liberal gain from Parti Québécois		Swing		+16.50
Source: Official Results, Le directeur général des élections du Québec.
