= Ruba Ghazal =

Canadian politician (born 1977)

Ruba Ghazal MNA
- ربى غزال
- Ghazal in 2018

Co-Spokesperson for Québec Solidaire
- Incumbent
- Assumed office November 16, 2024 Serving with Sol Zanetti
- Preceded by: Christine Labrie (interim)

Member of the National Assembly for Mercier
- Incumbent
- Assumed office October 18, 2018
- Preceded by: Amir Khadir

Personal details
- Born: December 6, 1977 (age 48) Beirut, Lebanon
- Party: Québec solidaire
- Domestic partner: Hubert Proulx
- Education: HEC Montréal; Université de Sherbrooke
- Profession: Chartered accountant

Ruba Ghazal (Arabic: ربى غزال; born December 6, 1977) is a Canadian politician. A member of Québec solidaire, she was first elected to the National Assembly of Quebec in the 2018 provincial election, representing the district of Mercier. Since 2024, she has served as Québec solidaire's female co-spokesperson.

== Early life and education ==
Ghazal was born in Beirut, Lebanon to a family of Palestinian refugees. She lived in the United Arab Emirates until she was 10, when her family immigrated to Quebec. She studied at HEC Montréal.

== Political career ==
Ghazal was a founding member of Québec solidaire in 2006, and was the party's candidate for Laurier-Dorion in the 2007 and 2008 general elections. In 2018, she was elected to the National Assembly of Quebec for Mercier, succeeding Amir Khadir.

Following re-election in the 2022 provincial election, she became the opposition critic for Education, Culture and Communications, the French Language, and the Status of Women.

In 2023, Ghazal ran for the female co-spokesperson election of Québec solidaire. Ghazal lost the election in the second round, getting 49.7% for Ghazal against Émilise Lessard-Therrien who obtained 50.3%. After Lessard-Therrien stepped down in April 2024, she again ran for the co-spokesperson position. On November 16, she was acclaimed co-spokesperson after an uncontested election. She was the party's candidate for premier in the 2026 Quebec general election, during which she was re-elected to a third term as MNA.

== Political views ==
=== Language issues ===
Ghazal has pushed for government policies to reverse the decline of the French language in Montreal. As Québec solidaire's critic for language issues, Ghazal has advocated for the creation of a special branch of the Office québécois de la langue française (OQLF) for Montreal.

=== Foreign policy ===
In 2021, Ghazal attended protests amid the 2021 Israel–Palestine crisis against the Israeli government's actions in actions in Sheikh Jarrah. Ghazal stated that "One day we will look back and declare this a humanitarian crime against Palestinians." Ghazal was among the signatories of a 2021 letter opposing Canada's bid for a seat on the United Nations Security Council due to the country's position on Palestine.

== Personal life ==
Ghazal has been in a relationship with Hubert Proulx since 2021.

== Electoral record ==
2026 Quebec general election: Mercier
** Preliminary results — Not yet official **
Party	Candidate	Votes	%	±%
Québec solidaire	Ruba Ghazal	17,761	59.20	
Liberal	Thierno Diallo	5,831	19.44	
Parti Québécois	Phoudsady Vanny	3,766	12.55	
Conservative	François Plamondon	1,001	3.34	
Coalition Avenir Québec	Kelly-Anne Gagné	975	3.25	
Green	Laurel Thompson	294	0.98	
Parti nul	Jenny Cartwright	157	0.52	
Communist	Michelle Paquette	120	0.40	
Climat Québec	Jogues Sauriol	71	0.24	
Independent	Jocelyn Simon Daigle	25	0.08	
Total valid votes				
Total rejected ballots				
Turnout			66.46	
Electors on the lists			–	–
Source: Élections Québec

2022 Quebec general election: Mercier
Party	Candidate	Votes	%	±%
Québec solidaire	Ruba Ghazal	14,755	53.92	-0.58
Parti Québécois	Sabrina Mercier-Ullhorn	3,986	14.57	+2.44
Liberal	Catherine Boundjia	3,837	14.02	-3.69
Coalition Avenir Québec	Florence Lavictoire	2,814	10.28	+2.24
Conservative	Emmanuel Da Costa	1,051	3.84	+3.42
Green	Véronique Langlois	818	2.99	-0.78
Parti nul	Jenny Cartwright	102	0.37	-0.43
Total valid votes		27,363	99.14	–
Total rejected ballots		238	0.86	–
Turnout		27,601	63.62	
Electors on the lists		43,387		

2018 Quebec general election: Mercier
Party	Candidate	Votes	%	±%
Québec solidaire	Ruba Ghazal	15,919	54.5	+8.31
Liberal	Gabrielle Collu	5,172	17.71	-5.31
Parti Québécois	Michelle Blanc	3,542	12.13	-8.37
Coalition Avenir Québec	Johanne Gagné	2,348	8.04	-0.34
Green	Stephanie Rochemont	1,102	3.77	
New Democratic	Conrad Thompson	738	2.53	
Parti nul	Malou Marcil	233	0.8	
Conservative	Ludovic Proulx	122	0.42	
Marxist–Leninist	Serge Lachapelle	34	0.12	
Total valid votes		29,210	98.91	
Total rejected ballots		322	1.09	
Turnout		29,532	65.56	
Eligible voters		45,048		
Québec solidaire hold		Swing		+6.81
Source(s) "Rapport des résultats officiels du scrutin". Élections Québec.
