= Action démocratique du Québec candidates in the 1994 Quebec provincial election =

Canadian provincial political party

The Action démocratique du Québec (ADQ) party fielded eighty candidates in the 1994 Quebec provincial election. One candidate, party leader Mario Dumont, was elected. Information about the party's other candidates may be found on this page.

== Candidates ==
=== Brome-Missisquoi: Benoit Trudeau ===
Benoit Trudeau was a 22-year-old communications student at the Universite du Quebec at the time of the election. He acknowledged he had no chance of winning and said, "I had nothing to lose by running. I didn't want to just sit around in my living room criticizing others." He received 2,037 votes (6.77%), finishing third against Liberal Party incumbent Pierre Paradis.

=== Fabre: Lucie Jobin ===
Lucie Jobin received 5,043 votes (12.64%) in the 1994 election, finishing third against Parti Québécois candidate Joseph Facal. The following year, she was the ADQ's representative on a Laval commission established by the provincial government of Jacques Parizeau during the buildup to the 1995 Quebec referendum to explore issues relating to Quebec sovereignty. She refused to sign the committee's final report, accusing the Parti Québécois of distorting its findings to suggest a greater support for Quebec sovereignty than actually existed. She later chaired the Comite de Citoyens de Laval-Ouest.

=== Mercier: Carole Boucher ===
Carole Boucher received 1,681 votes (5.42%), finishing third against Parti Québécois candidate Robert Perreault.
