= Quebec Liberal Party candidates in the 1998 Quebec provincial election =

The Quebec Liberal Party fielded a full slate of 125 candidates in the 1998 provincial election and won forty-eight seats to retain their status as the Official Opposition party in the National Assembly. Many of the party's candidates have their own biography pages; information about others may be found here.

== Candidates ==
=== Abitibi-Est: Lionel Brochu ===
Lionel Brochu received 8, 993 votes (37.17%), finishing second against incumbent Parti Quebecois candidate André Pelletier. This riding was the only one Abitibi that the Liberal Party of Quebec thought they could flip from the Parti Quebecois.

=== Abitibi-Ouest: Martin Veilleux ===
Martin Veilleux received 7,333 votes (29,60%), finishing second against incumbent Parti Quebecois candidate François Gendron.

=== Acadie: Yvan Bordeleau ===
Yvan Bordeleau received 26,316 votes (75.19%) and was an incumbent candidate.

=== Anjou: Jean-Sebastien Lamoureux ===
Jean-Sébastien Lamoureux received 12,097 votes (44,51%) over incumbent Parti Quebecois candidate Pierre Bélanger. Mr. Lamoureux would, however. not complete his term, resigning 2 years later over irregularities that had taken place during the vote.

=== Argenteuil: David Whissell ===
David Whissell first elected in a by-election in June of 1998, he was re-elected and received 16,684 votes (42.44%).

=== Athabasca: Jacques Lamontagne ===
Jacques Lamontagne received 12,197 votes (33,63%), finishing second behind Parti Quebecois incumbent candidate Jacques Baril.

=== Beauce-Nord: Normand Poulin ===
Normand Poulin was re-elected and received 12,137 votes (46,39%).

=== Fabre: Joanne Gauthier ===
Joanne Gauthier highlighted health and education issues during the campaign. She received 17,507 votes (40.51%), finishing second against incumbent Parti Québécois cabinet minister Joseph Facal.

=== Labelle: Raymond Laporte ===
Raymond Laporte received 9,024 votes (31.07%), finishing second against incumbent Parti Québécois cabinet minister Jacques Léonard.

=== Mercier: Elizabeth da Silva ===
Elizabeth da Silva highlighted anti-poverty issues during the campaign. She received 9,005 votes (28.42%), finishing second against incumbent Parti Québécois cabinet minister Robert Perreault.

=== Richelieu: Gilles Ferlatte ===
Gilles Ferlatte is a former Montreal police inspector who was fifty years old during the election. He had previously sought election for mayor of Tracy in 1995. He attracted controversy in the 1998 campaign when he said that the Hells Angels did not pose a problem in his riding. Party leader Jean Charest quickly distanced himself from this comment, which was widely criticized in the media.

Electoral record
Election	Division	Party	Votes	%	Place	Winner
1995 municipal	Mayor of Tracy	n/a	not listed	not listed	3/3	Émile Parent
1998 provincial	Richelieu	Liberal	8,718	27.66	2/5	Sylvain Simard, Parti Québécois
