= Jean-Pierre Charbonneau =

Canadian politician (born 1950)

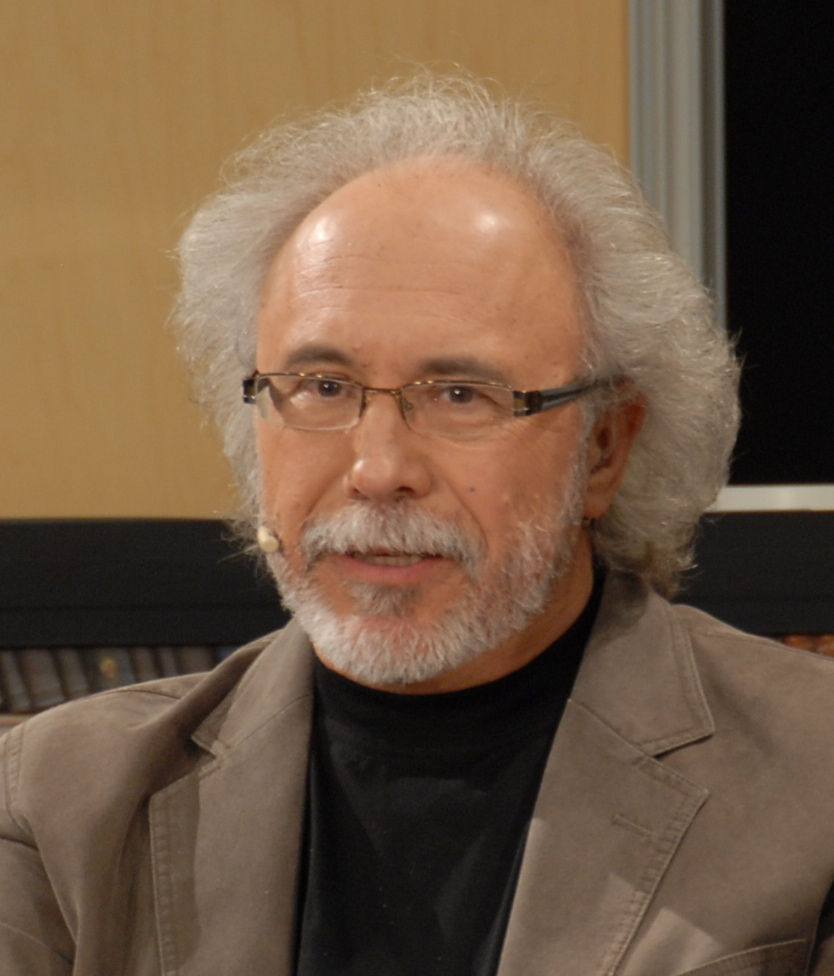
Jean-Pierre Charbonneau in 2010

Jean-Pierre Charbonneau OQ (French pronunciation: [ʒɑ̃ pjɛʁ ʃaʁbɔno]; born January 3, 1950, in Saint-Eustache, Quebec) is a journalist and a former Quebec politician. He was the Quebec MNA member under the Parti Québécois for the provincial ridings of Borduas and Verchères in the Montérégie region.

== Life and career ==
After studying at Montreal's Ahuntsic College in social sciences, Charbonneau attended the Université de Montréal in criminology and obtained a bachelor's degree in 1972. He later had a lengthy journalistic career in which he worked for several media outlets in the Montreal region including radio stations CKAC and CKVL, newspapers including Le Devoir and La Presse and various magazines and revues. He was mostly a journalist and specialist in crime news. He also published several books related to organized crime which earned him an award.

On May 1, 1973, Antonio Mucci, a Montreal Mafia member, fired three times at him in the offices of Le Devoir. One shot hit him in the arm. He was back at work two months later.

Charbonneau first entered politics in 1976 when he was elected in Vercheres and the Parti Québécois, led by René Lévesque defeated Robert Bourassa's Liberals during that election. He was a prominent figure in attracting supporters of sovereignty during the 1980 referendum which resulted in a victory for the No side.

He was re-elected in 1981 and 1985 before stepping down the first time in 1989 prior to a humanitarian trip to Africa organized by the Université de Montréal and the criminology faculty. He was not named as a minister during his first 13 years but was the parliamentary secretary to Lévesque in 1983 and 1984 and headed several committees.

He was also briefly an administration member of Oxfam-Quebec, an NGO concentrating in international development and aid. He also taught Tai chi in his area for five years and returned to co-host a radio show on CHKL. While being away from politics he participated in Belanger-Campeau Committee which was launched by the Bourassa government in the fallout of the failure of the Meech Lake Accord which would have accorded Quebec a distinct society mention.

Charbonneau re-entered politics in 1994 where he was elected as an MNA for the riding of Borduas when the Parti Québécois under the leadership of Jacques Parizeau, defeated the Liberals led by Daniel Johnson, Jr. He was re-elected successfully in 1998 and 2003. He was the speaker of the provincial legislative assembly of Quebec for six years, from 1996 to 2002, before being named the Deputy Minister of Intergovernmental Affairs in the Bernard Landry cabinet, until the party's defeat to Jean Charest's Liberals in the 2003 elections. He served as critic of the opposition party in public safety and health until his second retirement on November 15, 2006.

At one time Charbonneau was the minister for reform of democratic institutions under the PQ government. He later became president of the Mouvement démocratie nouvelle, which advocates proportional representation in Quebec.
