= Commission scolaire de Chomedey-Laval =

Historical school district in Quebec, Canada

The Commission scolaire de Chomedey-Laval is a historical school district in Laval, Quebec.
