= Minister responsible for the Montreal region (Quebec) =

The Minister responsible for the Montreal region is a ministerial designation in the government of Quebec. The minister who holds this position is responsible for coordinating the Quebec government's policies in the city of Montreal and the surrounding region. This is not a full ministerial portfolio and is generally held by a minister who also has other cabinet responsibilities.

The current minister is Chantal Rouleau, she is also the Minister for Transport
