= Mercier (provincial electoral district) =

Provincial electoral district in Quebec, Canada

Coordinates: 45°31′40″N 73°34′45″W

Quebec electoral district
- Location in Montreal

Provincial electoral district
- Legislature: National Assembly of Quebec
MNA
Ruba Ghazal
Québec solidaire
- District created: 1965
- First contested: 1966
- Last contested: 2026

Demographics
- Population (2006): 57,064
- Electors (2014): 40,052
- Area (km²): 4.9
- Pop. density (per km²): 11,645.7
- Census division: Montreal (part)
- Census subdivision: Montreal (part)

Mercier (French pronunciation: [mɛʁsje]) is a provincial electoral district in the Montreal region of Quebec, Canada, that elects members to the National Assembly of Quebec. It consists of part of the Le Plateau-Mont-Royal borough of the city of Montreal.

It was created for the 1966 election from parts of Montréal-Mercier and Montréal–Saint-Louis electoral districts.

In the change from the 2001 to the 2011 electoral map, its territory was unchanged. In the change from the 2011 to the 2017 electoral map, the riding gained the remainder of the Mile End neighbourhood from Outremont.

It was named in honour of former Quebec Premier Honoré Mercier.

== Members of the Legislative Assembly / National Assembly ==
Legislature	Years	Member	Party
Riding created from Montréal-Mercier and Montréal–Saint-Louis
28th	1966–1970	Robert Bourassa	Liberal
29th	1970–1973	Robert Bourassa	Liberal
30th	1973–1976	Robert Bourassa	Liberal
31st	1976–1981	Gérald Godin	Parti Québécois
32nd	1981–1985	Gérald Godin	Parti Québécois
33rd	1985–1989	Gérald Godin	Parti Québécois
34th	1989–1994	Gérald Godin	Parti Québécois
35th	1994–1998	Robert Perreault	Parti Québécois
36th	1998–2000	Robert Perreault	Parti Québécois
36th	2001–2003	Nathalie Rochefort	Liberal
37th	2003–2007	Daniel Turp	Parti Québécois
38th	2007–2008	Daniel Turp	Parti Québécois
39th	2008–2012	Amir Khadir	Québec solidaire
40th	2012–2014	Amir Khadir	Québec solidaire
41st	2014–2018	Amir Khadir	Québec solidaire
42nd	2018–2022	Ruba Ghazal	Québec solidaire
43rd	2022–2026	Ruba Ghazal	Québec solidaire
44th	2026–Present	Ruba Ghazal	Québec solidaire

== Election results ==
2026 Quebec general election
** Preliminary results — Not yet official **
Party	Candidate	Votes	%	±%
Québec solidaire	Ruba Ghazal	17,761	59.20	
Liberal	Thierno Diallo	5,831	19.44	
Parti Québécois	Phoudsady Vanny	3,766	12.55	
Conservative	François Plamondon	1,001	3.34	
Coalition Avenir Québec	Kelly-Anne Gagné	975	3.25	
Green	Laurel Thompson	294	0.98	
Parti nul	Jenny Cartwright	157	0.52	
Communist	Michelle Paquette	120	0.40	
Climat Québec	Jogues Sauriol	71	0.24	
Independent	Jocelyn Simon Daigle	25	0.08	
Total valid votes				
Total rejected ballots				
Turnout			66.46	
Electors on the lists			–	–
Source: Élections Québec

2022 Quebec general election
Party	Candidate	Votes	%	±%
Québec solidaire	Ruba Ghazal	14,755	53.92	-0.58
Parti Québécois	Sabrina Mercier-Ullhorn	3,986	14.57	+2.44
Liberal	Catherine Boundjia	3,837	14.02	-3.69
Coalition Avenir Québec	Florence Lavictoire	2,814	10.28	+2.24
Conservative	Emmanuel Da Costa	1,051	3.84	+3.42
Green	Véronique Langlois	818	2.99	-0.78
Parti nul	Jenny Cartwright	102	0.37	-0.43
Total valid votes		27,363	99.14	–
Total rejected ballots		238	0.86	–
Turnout		27,601	63.62	
Electors on the lists		43,387		

2018 Quebec general election
Party	Candidate	Votes	%	±%
Québec solidaire	Ruba Ghazal	15,919	54.5	+8.31
Liberal	Gabrielle Collu	5,172	17.71	-5.31
Parti Québécois	Michelle Blanc	3,542	12.13	-8.37
Coalition Avenir Québec	Johanne Gagné	2,348	8.04	-0.34
Green	Stephanie Rochemont	1,102	3.77	
New Democratic	Conrad Thompson	738	2.53	
Parti nul	Malou Marcil	233	0.8	
Conservative	Ludovic Proulx	122	0.42	
Marxist–Leninist	Serge Lachapelle	34	0.12	
Total valid votes		29,210	98.91	
Total rejected ballots		322	1.09	
Turnout		29,532	65.56	
Eligible voters		45,048		
Québec solidaire hold		Swing		+6.81
Source(s) "Rapport des résultats officiels du scrutin". Élections Québec.

2014 Quebec general election
Party	Candidate	Votes	%	±%
Québec solidaire	Amir Khadir	13,228	46.19	-0.54
Liberal	Richard Sagala	6,593	23.02	+9.52
Parti Québécois	Sylvie Legault	5,872	20.50	-3.04
Coalition Avenir Québec	Alain Clavet	2,400	8.38	-2.63
Option nationale	Martin Servant	228	0.80	-1.59
Bloc Pot	Hate's Deslandes	189	0.66	
Independent	Roger Hughes	129	0.45	
Total valid votes		28,639	98.76	–
Total rejected ballots		360	1.24	+0.42
Turnout		28,999	72.40	-3.87
Electors on the lists		40,052	–	–
Québec solidaire hold		Swing		-5.03
Source: Official Results, Le directeur général des élections du Québec.

2012 Quebec general election
Party	Candidate	Votes	%	±%
Québec solidaire	Amir Khadir	14,164	46.73	+8.84
Parti Québécois	Jean Poirier	7,137	23.55	-10.87
Liberal	Anne Pâquet	4,091	13.50	-7.84
Coalition Avenir Québec	Julie Boncompain	3,336	11.01	+8.52*
Green	David Kovaks	859	2.83	-0.77
Option nationale	Nic Payne	722	2.38	–
Total valid votes		30,309	99.18	–
Total rejected ballots		252	0.82	–
Turnout		30,561	76.27	+20.25
Electors on the lists		40,069	–	–

* Result compared to Action démocratique

2008 Quebec general election
Party	Candidate	Votes	%	±%
Québec solidaire	Amir Khadir	8,597	37.89	+8.51
Parti Québécois	Daniel Turp	7,787	34.32	+0.97
Liberal	Catherine Émond	4,842	21.34	+1.52
Green	Olivier Adam	818	3.60	−4.88
Action démocratique	Élisa Fortin-Toutant	565	2.49	−5.93
Parti indépendantiste	Jean-Marc Labrèche	83	0.37	–
Total valid votes		22,692	99.02	
Total rejected ballots		224	0.98	
Turnout		22,916	56.02	
Electors on the lists		40,907		
Source: Official Results, Le Directeur général des élections du Québec.

2007 Quebec general election
Party	Candidate	Votes	%	±%
Parti Québécois	Daniel Turp	9,426	33.35	−11.91
Québec solidaire	Amir Khadir	8,303	29.38	+11.46
Liberal	Nathalie Rochefort	5,601	19.82	−8.74
Green	Sylvain Valiquette	2,398	8.48	–
Action démocratique	Gabriel Tupula Yamba	2,381	8.42	+2.12
Bloc Pot	Nicky Tanguay	156	0.55	−1.42
Total valid votes		28,265	99.17	
Total rejected ballots		237	0.83	
Turnout		28,502	69.32	
Electors on the lists		41,115		
Source: Official Results, Le Directeur général des élections du Québec.

2003 Quebec general election
Party	Candidate	Votes	%	±%
Parti Québécois	Daniel Turp	13,334	45.26	+16.64
Liberal	Nathalie Rochefort	8,414	28.56	−6.10
UFP	Amir Khadir	5,278	17.92	-
Action démocratique	Vivian Goulder	1,855	6.30	+0.03
Bloc Pot	Lyne Rivard	579	1.97	−3.21
Total valid votes		29,460	100,00	
Parti Québécois gain from Liberal		Swing		+11.37
Source: Official Results, Le Directeur général des élections du Québec.

Quebec provincial by-election, April 9, 2001
Party	Candidate	Votes	%	±%
Liberal	Nathalie Rochefort	5,953	34.66	+6.24
Parti Québécois	Claudel Toussaint	4,915	28.62	−26.76
Independent	Paul Cliche	4,163	24.24	-
Action démocratique	André Larocque	1,077	6.27	−2.62
Bloc Pot	Pierre Audette	890	5.18	+2.07
No designation	Man Yee Cheung	67	0.39	-
Independent	Charles Robidoux	50	0.29	-
No designation	Michel Prairie	32	0.19	-
Independent	Régent Millette	27	0.16	-
Total valid votes		17,174	100,00	
Total rejected ballots		352	2,01	
Turnout		17,526	41.09	
Eligible voters		42,651		
Liberal gain from Parti Québécois		Swing		+16.50
Source: Official Results, Le directeur général des élections du Québec.

1998 Quebec general election
Party	Candidate	Votes	%	±%
Parti Québécois	Robert Perreault	17,552	55.38	−1.10
Liberal	Elizabeth da Silva	9,005	28.42	−2.13
Action démocratique	Paul Benevides	2,818	8.89	+3.47
Bloc Pot	Marc St-Maurice	985	3.11	
Socialist Democracy	Guylaine Sirard	873	2.75	+0.12
Independent	Ann Farrell	158	0.50	
Natural Law	Pierre Bergeron	154	0.49	−0.34
Marxist–Leninist	Normand Chouinard	79	0.25	−0.08
Communist	Pierre Smith	67	0.21	−0.21
Total valid votes		31,691	100,00	
Total rejected ballots		493	1,53	
Turnout		32,184	75.28	
Eligible voters		42,755		
Parti Québécois hold		Swing		+0.52
Source: Official Results, Le Directeur général des élections du Québec.

1995 Quebec referendum
Side	Votes	%
Oui	24,688	62.77
Non	14,644	37.23

1994 Quebec general election
Party	Candidate	Votes	%	±%
Parti Québécois	Robert Perreault	17,523	56.48	−0.67
Liberal	Alda Viero	9,479	30.55	+0.13
Action démocratique	Carole Boucher	1,681	5.42	–
Green	Jean-François Labadie	865	2.79	−5.59
New Democratic	Renée-Claude Lorimier	815	2.63	+0.21
Natural Law	Marylise Baux	259	0.83	-
Commonwealth of Canada	Julie Laliberté	173	0.56	-
Communist	Ginette Gauthier	129	0.42	–
Marxist–Leninist	Hélène Héroux	102	0.33	−0.13
Total valid votes		31,026	100.00	
Rejected and declined votes		815		
Turnout		31,841	80.33	
Electors on the lists		39,636		
Source: Official Results, Le Directeur général des élections du Québec.

1992 Charlottetown Accord referendum
Side	Votes	%
Non	17,072	62.88
Oui	10,076	37.12

1989 Quebec general election
Party	Candidate	Votes	%	±%
Parti Québécois	Gérald Godin	13,371	57.15	+10.04
Liberal	Daniel Gagnon	7,117	30.42	−12.39
Green	Manon Dubé	1,961	8.38	+6.67
New Democratic	Robert Saint-Louis	567	2.42	−2.27
Workers	Philippe Pouyer	168	0.72	+0.60
Marxist–Leninist	Arnold August	108	0.46	–
Socialist Movement	Gérard Talbot	106	0.45	–
Source: Official Results, Le Directeur général des élections du Québec.

1985 Quebec general election
Party	Candidate	Votes	%	±%
Parti Québécois	Gérald Godin	12,062	47.11	−7.42
Liberal	John Parisella	10,960	42.81	+1.43
New Democratic	Roger Couvrette	1,200	4.69	
Green	Yves Blanchette	437	1.71	
Humanist	Colette Renaud	348	1.36	
Parti indépendantiste	Denis Bourgeois	319	1.24	
Independent	Gilles Côté	97	0.38	−0.02
Commonwealth of Canada	Elena Mendez	75	0.29	
Communist	Gaetan Trudel	73	0.29	
No designation	Philippe Pouyer	31	0.12	
Total valid votes		25,602		
Rejected and declined votes		451		
Turnout		26,053	71.12	
Electors on the lists		36,635		
Source: Official Results, Le Directeur général des élections du Québec.

1981 Quebec general election
Party	Candidate	Votes	%	±%
Parti Québécois	Gérald Godin	16,252	54.53	+3.15
Liberal	Yves Bériault	12,333	41.38	+4.27
Union Nationale	Roger Courtemanche	495	1.66	−5.89
Workers Communist	Roger Rashi	250	0.84	-
Marxist–Leninist	Jacques Côté	125	0.42	-
United Social Credit	Gilles Côté	118	0.40	−2.07
Independent	Richard Langlois	116	0.39	-
Workers	Gérard Lachance	115	0.38	+0.08
Total valid votes		29,804	100,00	
Total rejected ballots		489	1,61	
Turnout		30,293	79.92	
Eligible voters		37,904		
Parti Québécois hold		Swing		−0.56
Source: Official Results, Le Directeur général des élections du Québec.

1980 Quebec referendum
Side	Votes	%
Non	13,131	51.91
Oui	12,163	48.09

1976 Quebec general election
Party	Candidate	Votes	%	±%
Parti Québécois	Gérald Godin	13,450	51.38	+9.57
Liberal	Robert Bourassa (incumbent)	9,714	37.11	−15.76
Union Nationale	Giuseppe Anzini	1,975	7.55	+5.97
Ralliement créditiste	Robert Roy	647	2.47	−0.64
New Democratic Party of Quebec - RMS coalition	Henri-François Gautrin	139	0.53	-
Communist	Guy Desautels	116	0.44	-
Workers	Gaston Morin	77	0.30	-
No designation	Louise Ouimet	58	0.22	-
Source: Official Results, Le Directeur général des élections du Québec.
Parti Québécois gain from Liberal		Swing		+12.67

1973 Quebec general election
Party	Candidate	Votes	%	±%
Liberal	Robert Bourassa	13,757	52.87	+6.22
Parti Québécois	Louis O'Neill	10,877	41.81	+4.47
Ralliement créditiste	Georges Brault	809	3.11	+0.03
Union Nationale	Jean-Louis Décarie	411	1.58	−11.03
Marxist–Leninist	Robert-A. Cruise	70	0.27	-
Independent	Guy Robillard	53	0.20	-
No designation	Jeannette Pratte Walsh	23	0.09	-
No designation	Guy Robitaille	18	0.07	-
Source: Official Results, Le Directeur général des élections du Québec.

1970 Quebec general election
Party	Candidate	Votes	%	±%
Liberal	Robert Bourassa	15,337	46.65	+2.38
Parti Québécois	Pierre Bourgault	12,276	37.34	-
Union Nationale	Conrad Touchette	4,145	12.61	-29.71
Ralliement créditiste	Clément Patry	1,011	3.08	-
Independent	Paul Ouellet	106	0.32	-
Total valid votes		32,875	100.0	
Source: Official Results, Le Directeur général des élections du Québec.

1966 Quebec general election
Party	Candidate	Votes	%	±%
Liberal	Robert Bourassa	11,759	44.27	−9.80
Union Nationale	Conrad Touchette	11,241	42.32	−1.18
RIN	André Dagenais	3,115	11.73	-
Ralliement national	Roger Smith	335	1.26	-
Independent	Lucien-Jacques Cossette	112	0.42	-
Source: Official Results, Le Directeur général des élections du Québec.

== See also ==
- List of Quebec provincial electoral districts
- Canadian provincial electoral districts
