= Bloc pot =

Bloc Pot Bloc pot
- Leader: Jean-Patrick Berthiaume
- Founder: Marc-Boris St-Maurice
- Founded: 1998
- Membership (2025): 350
- Ideology: Legalization of marijuana Proportional representation Alter-globalization; Environmentalism; Quebec federalism
- National affiliation: Marijuana Party
- Colours: Green
- Seats in the National Assembly: 0 / 127

Website
- blocpot.qc.ca

The Bloc Pot is a provincial political party in Quebec, Canada, that is dedicated to ending cannabis prohibition. It has contested four provincial elections but it has failed to win any seats in the National Assembly of Quebec. The party was launched in 1997 by Marc-Boris St-Maurice as a way to push for political change to marijuana laws. He also went on to launch its federal offspring, the Marijuana Party of Canada.

== Leaders of the Bloc Pot ==
- Marc-Boris St-Maurice (1998-2000)
- Pierre Audette (2000-2001)
- Alexandre Néron (acting, 2001-2002)
- Hugô St-Onge (2002-2012)
- Pacifique Plante (2012-2017)
- Jean-Patrick Berthiaume (acting, 2017-2020)
- Daniel Blackburn (2020-2023)
- Benjamin Vachon (2023-2024)
- Steve Berthelot (2024-2025)
- Jean-Patrick Berthiaume (2025-)

== Election results ==
General election	# of candidates	# of elected candidates	% of popular vote
1998	24	0	0.24%
2003	56	0	0.60%
2007	9	0	0.04%
2008	The party did not participate in this election.		
2012	2	0	0.01%
2014	14	0	0.06%
2018	29	0	0.12%
2022	The party did not participate in this election.		
2026	5	0	0.01

== See also ==
- Drug policy reform
- Cannabis in Quebec
- Legal issues of cannabis
- List of Quebec general elections
- List of Quebec leaders of the Opposition
- List of Quebec premiers
- Marijuana parties
- Marijuana Party (Canada)
- National Assembly of Quebec
- Political parties in Quebec
- Politics of Quebec
- Timeline of Quebec history
