= 1998 Quebec general election =

Canadian provincial election

- November 30, 1998

125 seats in the 36th Quebec Legislature 63 seats needed for a majority
- Turnout: 78.32% (▼3.26%)
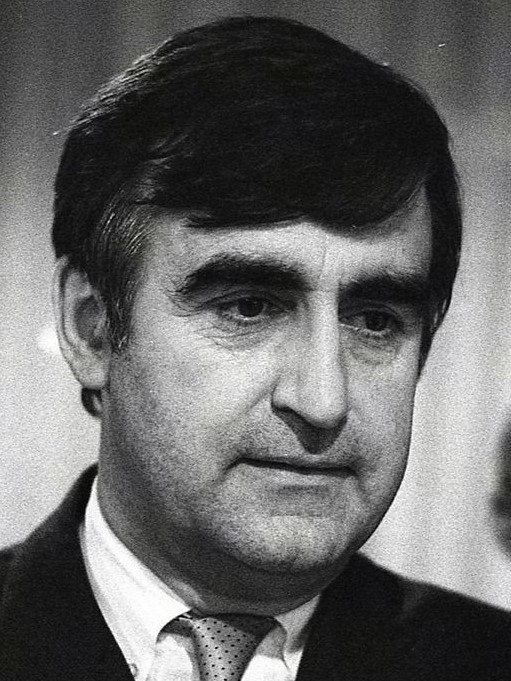

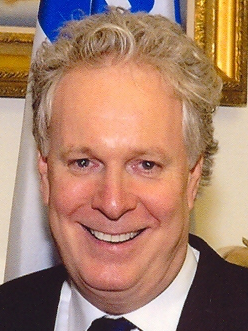

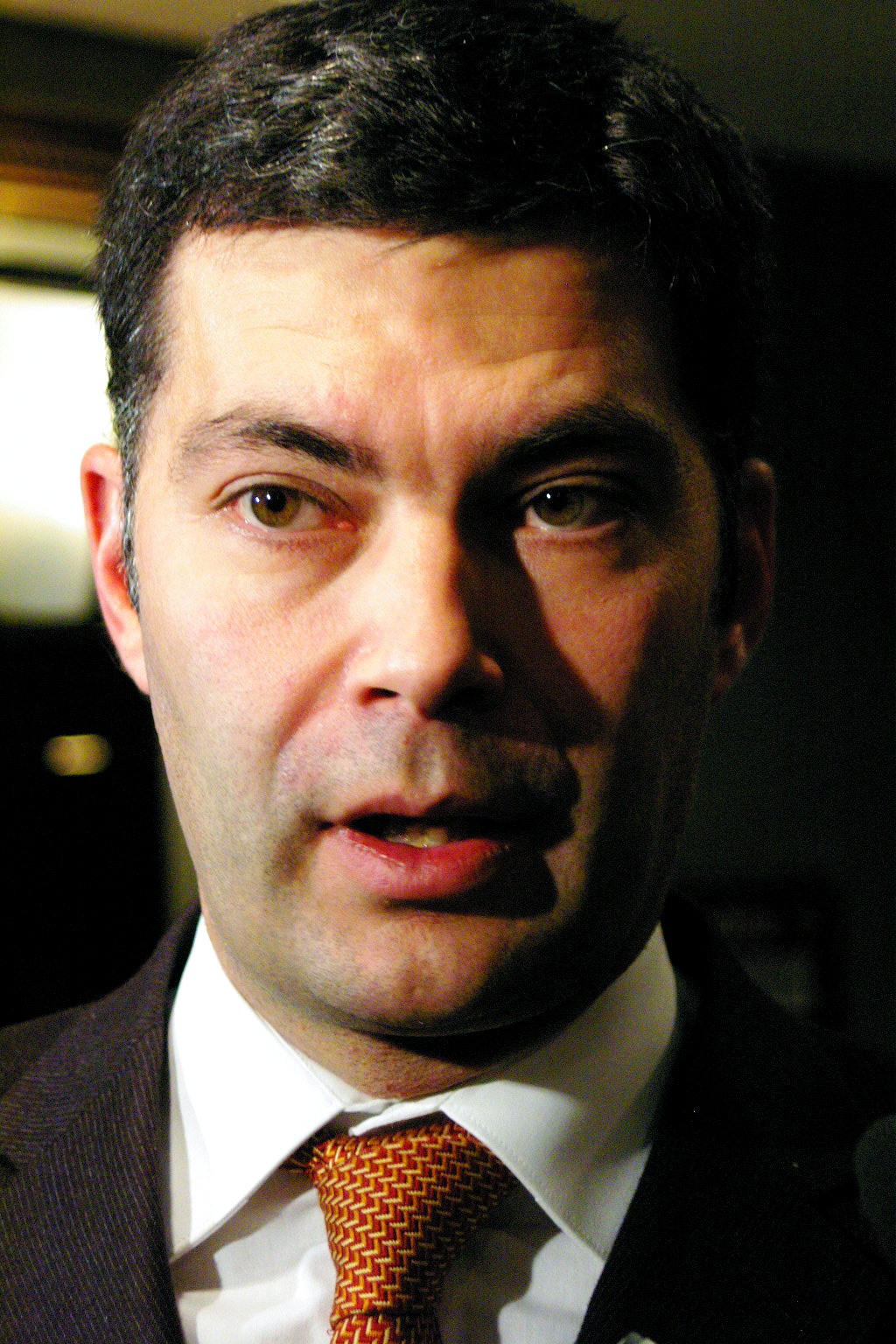
	First party	Second party	Third party
Leader	Lucien Bouchard	Jean Charest	Mario Dumont
Party	Parti Québécois	Liberal	Action démocratique
Leader since	January 27, 1996	April 30, 1998	May 11, 1994
Leader's seat	Jonquière	Ran in Sherbrooke (won)	Rivière-du-Loup
Last election	77 seats, 44.75%	47 seats, 44.40%	1 seat, 6.46%
Seats won	76	48	1
Seat change	▼1	▲1	Steady
Popular vote	1,744,240	1,771,858	480,636
Percentage	42.87%	43.55%	11.81%
Swing	▼1.88%	▼0.85%	▲5.35%
- Popular vote by riding. As this is an FPTP election, seat totals are not determined by popular vote, but instead via results by each riding. Click the map for more details.
Premier before election
Lucien Bouchard
Parti Québécois
Premier after election
Lucien Bouchard
Parti Québécois

The 1998 Quebec general election was held on November 30, 1998, to elect members of the National Assembly of the Province of Quebec, Canada. The incumbent Parti Québécois, led by Premier Lucien Bouchard, won re-election, defeating the Quebec Liberal Party, led by Jean Charest. To date this is the last election where the Parti Québécois won a majority of seats in the Quebec Assembly and received over 40% of the vote, although not the last in which it formed a government.

After the narrow defeat of the PQ's proposal for political independence for Quebec in an economic union with the rest of Canada in the 1995 Quebec referendum, PQ leader Jacques Parizeau resigned. In January 1996, Bouchard left federal politics, where he was leader of the Bloc Québécois in the House of Commons of Canada, to lead the Parti Québécois and become premier.

Jean Charest had also left federal politics, where he had been leader of the Progressive Conservative Party of Canada. Charest was initially seen as a bad fit for the Quebec Liberal Party, and for provincial politics. He later overcame this perception.

In terms of the number of seats won by each of the two parties, the result was almost identical to the previous 1994 general election. However, this time the Liberals won a slightly larger percentage of the popular vote, but nonetheless far fewer seats.

Mario Dumont, leader of the Action démocratique du Québec, repeated his success in winning his own seat, as he had done in the 1994 general election. However, his party also repeated its failure to elect any other member apart from its leader.

This election was the last election until 2026 where sovereigntist parties won a combined majority of seats in the National Assembly (the Parti Québécois and Québec solidaire).

== Results ==
Elections to the National Assembly of Quebec (1998)
Political party	Party leader	MNAs				Votes			
Political party	Party leader	Candidates	1994	1998	±	#	±	%	± (pp)
Parti Québécois	Lucien Bouchard	124	77	76	1▼	1,744,240	7,202▼	42.87%	1.88▼
Liberal	Jean Charest	125	47	48	1▲	1,771,858	34,160▲	43.55%	0.85▼
Action démocratique	Mario Dumont	125	1	1	Steady	480,636	227,915▲	11.81%	5.36▲
Socialist Democracy (Note: comparison is with NDP 1994 results)	Paul Rose	97	–	–	–	24,097	9,172▼	0.59%	0.26▼
Equality	Keith Henderson	24	–	–	–	12,543	1,017▲	0.31%	0.01▲
Independent		39	–	–	–	12,441	53,780▼	0.31%	1.39▼
Bloc Pot	Marc-Boris St-Maurice	24	–	–	–	9,944	9,944▲	0.24%	New
Natural Law	Allen Faguy	35	–	–	–	5,369	27,837▼	0.13%	0.72▼
Marxist–Leninist		24	–	–	–	2,747	1,576▲	0.07%	0.04▲
Parti innovateur du Québec		20	–	–	–	2,484	623▲	0.06%	0.01▲
Communist		20	–	–	–	2,113	1,051▲	0.05%	0.02▲
Total		657	125	125		4,068,472		100.00%	
Rejected ballots						46,991	31,548▼		
Voter turnout						4,115,163	123,136▲	78.32	3.26▼
Registered electors						5,254,482	361,017▲		

=== Vote and seat summaries ===
Ternary plots - shift of electoral support (1994-1998)
1994

1998
Electoral districts identified by colours of winning parties

Seats and popular vote by party
Party	Seats	Votes	Change (pp)
█ Parti Québécois	76 / 125	42.87%	-1.88
█ Liberal	48 / 125	43.55%	-0.85
█ Action démocratique	1 / 125	11.81%	5.36
█ Independent	0 / 125	0.31%	-1.39
█ Other	0 / 125	1.46%	-1.24

=== Synopsis of results ===
Results by riding - 1998 Quebec general election
Riding	Winning party						Turnout (Note: including spoilt ballots)	Votes							
Name	1994	Party	Votes	Share	Margin #	Margin %	Turnout	PQ	PLQ	ADQ	PDS	Eq	Ind	Oth	Total
Abitibi-Est	PQ	PQ	12,302	50.85%	3,309	13.68%	74.27%	12,302	8,993	2,417	144	–	338	–	24,194
Abitibi-Ouest	PQ	PQ	14,733	59.48%	7,400	29.87%	74.39%	14,733	7,333	2,430	–	–	274	–	24,770
Acadie	PLQ	PLQ	26,316	75.19%	19,629	56.08%	78.05%	6,687	26,316	1,629	136	–	–	233	35,001
Anjou	PQ	PLQ	12,097	44.51%	143	0.53%	82.31%	11,954	12,097	2,825	192	–	–	112	27,180
Argenteuil	PLQ	PLQ	16,684	42.47%	148	0.38%	78.29%	16,536	16,684	5,058	128	–	271	610	39,287
Arthabaska	PQ	PQ	19,469	53.69%	7,272	20.05%	81.06%	19,469	12,197	4,597	–	–	–	–	36,263
Beauce-Nord	PLQ	PLQ	12,137	46.39%	2,011	7.69%	79.98%	10,126	12,137	3,772	127	–	–	–	26,162
Beauce-Sud	PLQ	PLQ	15,784	48.77%	3,877	11.98%	76.08%	11,907	15,784	4,235	233	–	205	–	32,364
Beauharnois-Huntingdon	PLQ	PLQ	15,487	47.27%	2,038	6.22%	81.32%	13,449	15,487	3,461	147	218	–	–	32,762
Bellechasse	PQ	PQ	11,323	47.58%	2,179	9.16%	79.17%	11,323	9,144	3,149	184	–	–	–	23,800
Berthier	PQ	PQ	20,074	53.58%	8,364	22.33%	79.51%	20,074	11,710	5,113	297	–	–	268	37,462
Bertrand	PLQ	PQ	15,666	46.63%	1,743	5.19%	77.38%	15,666	13,923	3,725	125	–	59	98	33,596
Blainville	PQ	PQ	17,692	50.99%	7,973	22.98%	82.82%	17,692	9,719	7,102	182	–	–	–	34,695
Bonaventure	PQ	PLQ	10,681	47.23%	160	0.71%	75.63%	10,521	10,681	1,412	–	–	–	–	22,614
Borduas	PQ	PQ	16,785	55.42%	7,599	25.09%	83.50%	16,785	9,186	4,041	274	–	–	–	30,286
Bourassa	PLQ	PLQ	13,434	53.92%	5,076	20.37%	78.46%	8,358	13,434	2,734	189	–	–	199	24,914
Bourget	PQ	PQ	13,056	47.73%	2,105	7.69%	79.54%	13,056	10,951	2,899	185	–	–	265	27,356
Brome-Missisquoi	PLQ	PLQ	18,127	57.17%	8,338	26.30%	80.56%	9,789	18,127	3,599	–	–	–	194	31,709
Chambly	PQ	PQ	22,559	52.51%	7,329	17.06%	84.63%	22,559	15,230	4,550	117	–	131	378	42,965
Champlain	PQ	PQ	17,254	47.29%	4,264	11.69%	82.43%	17,254	12,990	5,962	137	–	146	–	36,489
Chapleau	PLQ	PLQ	24,288	59.22%	11,688	28.50%	71.26%	12,600	24,288	3,617	281	–	–	226	41,012
Charlesbourg	PQ	PQ	15,985	41.00%	33	0.08%	82.19%	15,985	15,952	6,309	273	–	296	170	38,985
Charlevoix	PQ	PQ	13,648	56.60%	5,326	22.09%	76.49%	13,648	8,322	1,800	183	–	158	–	24,111
Châteauguay	PLQ	PLQ	16,655	46.92%	1,364	3.84%	84.18%	15,291	16,655	3,217	114	216	–	–	35,493
Chauveau	PQ	PQ	20,204	43.42%	2,830	6.08%	78.60%	20,204	17,374	8,203	519	–	–	235	46,535
Chicoutimi	PQ	PQ	19,980	57.26%	10,025	28.73%	74.82%	19,980	9,955	4,653	177	–	127	–	34,892
Chomedey	PLQ	PLQ	28,293	69.87%	19,424	47.97%	79.24%	8,869	28,293	2,768	195	368	–	–	40,493
Chutes-de-la-Chaudière	PQ	PQ	22,577	49.62%	8,781	19.30%	81.96%	22,577	13,796	8,486	358	–	286	–	45,503
Crémazie	PQ	PQ	13,953	45.35%	309	1.00%	81.34%	13,953	13,644	2,579	218	–	–	374	30,768
D'Arcy-McGee	PLQ	PLQ	29,065	90.61%	27,668	86.26%	76.17%	1,002	29,065	400	135	1,397	–	77	32,076
Deux-Montagnes	PQ	PQ	21,831	47.03%	7,453	16.05%	81.08%	21,831	14,378	9,628	141	121	–	324	46,423
Drummond	PQ	PQ	20,521	52.35%	7,187	18.33%	79.72%	20,521	13,334	5,007	–	–	337	–	39,199
Dubuc	PQ	PQ	16,388	59.81%	8,234	30.05%	74.69%	16,388	8,154	2,858	–	–	–	–	27,400
Duplessis	PQ	PQ	15,406	59.32%	7,011	27.00%	69.44%	15,406	8,395	2,170	–	–	–	–	25,971
Fabre	PQ	PQ	19,859	45.95%	2,352	5.44%	84.18%	19,859	17,507	5,696	156	–	–	–	43,218
Frontenac	PLQ	PQ	12,890	44.53%	903	3.12%	82.12%	12,890	11,987	4,073	–	–	–	–	28,950
Gaspé	PQ	PQ	11,047	50.41%	1,252	5.71%	74.62%	11,047	9,795	1,072	–	–	–	–	21,914
Gatineau	PLQ	PLQ	18,481	61.53%	9,222	30.71%	73.42%	9,259	18,481	1,794	202	–	–	298	30,034
Gouin	PQ	PQ	16,097	52.68%	5,824	19.06%	74.40%	16,097	10,273	3,276	624	–	61	224	30,555
Groulx	PQ	PQ	17,041	48.51%	4,577	13.03%	80.50%	17,041	12,464	5,263	171	–	–	191	35,130
Hochelaga-Maisonneuve	PQ	PQ	12,922	60.61%	7,478	35.08%	68.01%	12,922	5,444	2,454	292	–	–	208	21,320
Hull	PLQ	PLQ	18,873	59.30%	8,682	27.28%	70.87%	10,191	18,873	2,126	291	–	–	344	31,825
Iberville	PQ	PQ	17,657	47.03%	4,412	11.75%	81.28%	17,657	13,245	6,412	–	–	–	227	37,541
Îles-de-la-Madeleine	PLQ	PQ	4,732	52.54%	588	6.53%	87.57%	4,732	4,144	130	–	–	–	–	9,006
Jacques-Cartier	PLQ	PLQ	32,924	83.67%	29,609	75.25%	79.62%	3,315	32,924	1,392	217	1,502	–	–	39,350
Jeanne-Mance	PLQ	PLQ	22,669	77.31%	17,890	61.01%	79.21%	4,779	22,669	1,596	78	139	–	62	29,323
Jean-Talon	PLQ	PLQ	12,817	45.33%	156	0.55%	85.04%	12,661	12,817	2,298	326	–	171	–	28,273
Johnson	PQ	PQ	14,292	48.33%	3,129	10.58%	80.96%	14,292	11,163	3,824	290	–	–	–	29,569
Joliette	PQ	PQ	19,784	56.15%	10,148	28.80%	80.69%	19,784	9,636	5,310	504	–	–	–	35,234
Jonquière	PQ	PQ	20,475	60.48%	13,923	41.12%	76.91%	20,475	6,552	1,686	–	–	5,023 (Note: Michel Chartrand, candidate of the unregistered Rassemblement pour l'alternative progressiste)	120	33,856
Kamouraska-Témiscouata	PLQ	PLQ	11,259	43.49%	110	0.42%	74.72%	11,149	11,259	3,149	334	–	–	–	25,891
Labelle	PQ	PQ	17,023	58.61%	7,999	27.54%	76.01%	17,023	9,024	2,781	218	–	–	–	29,046
Lac-Saint-Jean	PQ	PQ	21,498	70.56%	15,706	51.55%	76.78%	21,498	5,792	3,178	–	–	–	–	30,468
LaFontaine	PLQ	PLQ	22,984	57.59%	10,868	27.23%	80.06%	12,116	22,984	4,476	161	–	–	176	39,913
La Peltrie	PQ	PQ	20,996	46.44%	4,862	10.75%	84.37%	20,996	16,134	7,382	492	–	–	206	45,210
La Pinière	PLQ	PLQ	22,849	60.73%	11,736	31.19%	80.70%	11,113	22,849	3,330	125	–	130	75	37,622
Laporte	PLQ	PLQ	19,587	52.85%	6,360	17.16%	80.28%	13,227	19,587	3,431	317	188	–	315	37,065
La Prairie	PQ	PQ	23,580	50.59%	9,144	19.62%	82.78%	23,580	14,436	8,354	242	–	–	–	46,612
L'Assomption	PQ	PQ	21,071	51.50%	10,745	26.26%	81.79%	21,071	10,326	8,941	214	–	–	365	40,917
Laurier-Dorion	PLQ	PLQ	19,471	56.70%	8,603	25.05%	76.21%	10,868	19,471	2,561	490	–	113	836	34,339
Laval-des-Rapides	PQ	PQ	13,938	45.49%	1,441	4.70%	78.85%	13,938	12,497	3,771	117	–	–	320	30,643
Laviolette	PQ	PQ	14,411	54.13%	5,120	19.23%	79.07%	14,411	9,291	2,758	–	–	–	162	26,622
Lévis	PQ	PQ	15,473	49.10%	4,390	13.93%	79.92%	15,473	11,083	4,553	196	–	149	60	31,514
Limoilou	PQ	PLQ	13,929	42.34%	1,298	3.95%	75.22%	12,631	13,929	5,576	345	–	307	109	32,897
Lotbinière	PQ	PQ	11,496	47.64%	2,348	9.73%	81.46%	11,496	9,148	3,486	–	–	–	–	24,130
Louis-Hébert	PQ	PQ	14,805	46.13%	1,838	5.73%	80.88%	14,805	12,967	3,977	169	–	–	178	32,096
Marguerite-Bourgeoys	PLQ	PLQ	23,234	68.15%	15,510	45.50%	79.93%	7,724	23,234	2,263	161	417	–	292	34,091
Marguerite-D'Youville	PQ	PQ	21,224	54.28%	9,283	23.74%	86.67%	21,224	11,941	5,370	240	–	–	327	39,102
Marie-Victorin	PQ	PQ	15,692	51.68%	5,816	19.16%	75.23%	15,692	9,876	4,054	245	–	–	495	30,362
Marquette	PLQ	PLQ	16,606	56.45%	6,845	23.27%	77.82%	9,761	16,606	2,615	–	264	–	173	29,419
Maskinongé	PQ	PQ	17,423	48.15%	4,193	11.59%	80.62%	17,423	13,230	5,225	–	–	–	308	36,186
Masson (Note: Election postponed to December 14 upon the death of PQ candidate Yves Blais. Gilles Labbé was nominated to take his place, and subsequently won.)	PQ	PQ	17,529	64.03%	12,615	46.08%	60.15%	17,529	4,453	4,914	143	–	42	295	27,376
Matane	PQ	PQ	11,847	57.63%	4,854	23.61%	72.97%	11,847	6,993	1,544	–	–	–	173	20,557
Matapédia	PQ	PQ	13,125	57.47%	5,715	25.02%	74.40%	13,125	7,410	1,882	238	–	–	184	22,839
Mégantic-Compton	PLQ	PLQ	12,675	50.49%	2,336	9.31%	79.89%	10,339	12,675	1,835	174	81	–	–	25,104
Mercier	PQ	PQ	17,552	55.38%	8,547	26.97%	75.28%	17,552	9,005	2,818	873	–	158	1,285	31,691
Mille-Îles	PQ	PQ	17,465	43.61%	865	2.16%	84.39%	17,465	16,600	5,440	156	–	–	390	40,051
Montmagny-L'Islet	PLQ	PLQ	11,047	45.99%	1,805	7.52%	75.32%	9,242	11,047	3,729	–	–	–	–	24,018
Montmorency	PQ	PQ	19,946	45.16%	5,128	11.61%	80.73%	19,946	14,818	7,154	267	–	1,774	204	44,163
Mont-Royal	PLQ	PLQ	24,367	80.24%	20,498	67.50%	72.77%	3,869	24,367	1,076	167	575	–	315	30,369
Nelligan	PLQ	PLQ	35,698	75.67%	28,206	59.79%	79.91%	7,492	35,698	2,848	156	840	140	–	47,174
Nicolet-Yamaska	PQ	PQ	14,166	50.23%	3,797	13.46%	84.59%	14,166	10,369	3,509	157	–	–	–	28,201
Notre-Dame-de-Grâce	PLQ	PLQ	22,627	77.62%	18,741	64.29%	73.92%	3,886	22,627	980	256	1,163	–	239	29,151
Orford	PLQ	PLQ	21,164	50.96%	4,916	11.84%	81.32%	16,248	21,164	3,624	352	–	–	144	41,532
Outremont	PLQ	PLQ	18,050	58.31%	8,172	26.40%	73.79%	9,878	18,050	1,667	545	212	–	603	30,955
Papineau	PLQ	PLQ	16,025	54.78%	4,848	16.57%	74.93%	11,177	16,025	1,604	126	–	114	209	29,255
Pointe-aux-Trembles	PQ	PQ	15,946	53.83%	6,836	23.08%	78.79%	15,946	9,110	4,205	205	–	–	158	29,624
Pontiac	PLQ	PLQ	22,076	75.27%	17,933	61.15%	74.59%	4,143	22,076	963	108	1,757	112	169	29,328
Portneuf	PQ	PQ	15,572	47.98%	3,273	10.09%	80.70%	15,572	12,299	4,283	298	–	–	–	32,452
Prévost	PQ	PQ	19,663	53.43%	8,409	22.85%	77.89%	19,663	11,254	5,372	229	–	–	280	36,798
Richelieu	PQ	PQ	17,745	56.31%	9,027	28.65%	80.99%	17,745	8,718	4,543	246	–	261	–	31,513
Richmond	PLQ	PLQ	14,358	53.06%	4,654	17.20%	81.90%	9,704	14,358	2,998	–	–	–	–	27,060
Rimouski	PQ	PQ	16,687	56.36%	7,070	23.88%	75.43%	16,687	9,617	2,710	192	–	–	400	29,606
Rivière-du-Loup	ADQ	ADQ	10,897	46.34%	4,589	19.52%	76.80%	6,308	5,952	10,897	61	–	98	197	23,513
Robert-Baldwin	PLQ	PLQ	31,702	84.08%	28,208	74.81%	78.06%	3,494	31,702	1,173	–	1,042	–	295	37,706
Roberval	PQ	PQ	19,288	59.95%	11,310	35.15%	73.12%	19,288	7,978	4,616	294	–	–	–	32,176
Rosemont	PQ	PQ	14,116	47.95%	2,668	9.06%	77.36%	14,116	11,448	3,029	263	–	–	585	29,441
Rousseau	PQ	PQ	18,076	55.35%	8,543	26.16%	75.94%	18,076	9,533	4,805	243	–	–	–	32,657
Rouyn-Noranda–Témiscamingue	PQ	PQ	15,922	49.29%	3,531	10.93%	76.25%	15,922	12,391	3,628	360	–	–	–	32,301
Saguenay	PQ	PQ	15,419	62.64%	10,418	42.32%	69.47%	15,419	5,001	4,036	159	–	–	–	24,615
Sainte-Marie–Saint-Jacques	PQ	PQ	16,530	52.94%	6,808	21.80%	67.51%	16,530	9,722	3,171	629	77	38	1,057	31,224
Saint-François	PLQ	PLQ	16,908	51.00%	3,679	11.10%	79.60%	13,229	16,908	2,575	296	–	–	148	33,156
Saint-Henri-Sainte-Anne	PLQ	PLQ	14,240	48.35%	2,307	7.83%	73.75%	11,933	14,240	2,570	205	124	126	251	29,449
Saint-Hyacinthe	PQ	PQ	18,555	49.60%	5,107	13.65%	81.74%	18,555	13,448	5,112	295	–	–	–	37,410
Saint-Jean	PQ	PQ	19,562	47.08%	3,770	9.07%	81.23%	19,562	15,792	5,778	–	–	–	420	41,552
Saint-Laurent	PLQ	PLQ	28,280	78.03%	22,551	62.22%	76.78%	5,729	28,280	1,468	129	472	–	165	36,243
Saint-Maurice	PQ	PQ	13,947	49.52%	3,728	13.24%	80.68%	13,947	10,219	3,998	–	–	–	–	28,164
Salaberry-Soulanges	PQ	PQ	21,588	51.82%	6,656	15.98%	82.99%	21,588	14,932	4,884	253	–	–	–	41,657
Sauvé	PLQ	PLQ	14,125	58.45%	6,712	27.77%	76.27%	7,413	14,125	2,084	172	–	–	372	24,166
Shefford	PLQ	PLQ	15,503	37.28%	73	0.18%	80.62%	15,430	15,503	10,220	–	–	90	344	41,587
Sherbrooke	PQ	PLQ	15,093	47.41%	907	2.85%	79.74%	14,186	15,093	2,171	–	–	169	219	31,838
Taillon	PQ	PQ	21,154	53.02%	8,782	22.01%	77.95%	21,154	12,372	5,877	345	–	–	147	39,895
Taschereau	PQ	PQ	11,327	47.00%	2,534	10.51%	73.84%	11,327	8,793	3,033	521	–	428	–	24,102
Terrebonne	PQ	PQ	21,252	59.47%	13,057	36.54%	81.03%	21,252	8,195	6,077	210	–	–	–	35,734
Trois-Rivières	PQ	PQ	13,495	46.31%	1,523	5.23%	78.91%	13,495	11,972	3,477	–	–	82	113	29,139
Ungava	PQ	PQ	6,482	48.22%	965	7.18%	61.93%	6,482	5,517	1,443	–	–	–	–	13,442
Vachon	PQ	PQ	16,993	49.75%	5,238	15.33%	81.85%	16,993	11,755	5,147	–	–	161	103	34,159
Vanier	PQ	PQ	16,885	43.58%	2,477	6.39%	77.80%	16,885	14,408	7,022	429	–	–	–	38,744
Vaudreuil	PLQ	PLQ	22,934	51.92%	6,711	15.19%	81.79%	16,223	22,934	4,420	218	377	–	–	44,172
Verchères	PQ	PQ	19,055	60.64%	11,768	37.45%	83.22%	19,055	7,287	4,747	335	–	–	–	31,424
Verdun	PLQ	PLQ	17,441	52.76%	5,771	17.46%	75.70%	11,670	17,441	3,105	151	171	66	456	33,060
Viau (Note: Aurèle Bourassa (PQ) withdrew from the contest, and then changed his mind. His bid to be reinstated on the ballot was refused.)	PLQ	PLQ	18,774	70.08%	13,560	50.62%	73.54%	–	18,774	5,214	426	174	–	2,201	26,789
Viger	PLQ	PLQ	18,715	64.80%	11,219	38.84%	80.30%	7,496	18,715	2,369	168	–	–	135	28,883
Vimont	PQ	PQ	20,938	45.39%	1,853	4.02%	84.69%	20,938	19,085	5,604	215	–	–	292	46,134
Westmount-Saint-Louis	PLQ	PLQ	26,244	79.17%	21,635	65.26%	66.26%	4,609	26,244	1,150	224	648	–	275	33,150

= open seat
= turnout is above provincial average
= winning candidate was in previous Legislature
= incumbent had switched allegiance
= previously incumbent in another riding
= not incumbent; was previously elected to the Legislature
= incumbency arose from byelection gain
= other incumbents renominated
= previously an MP in the House of Commons of Canada
= multiple candidates

=== Comparative analysis for ridings (1998 vs 1994) ===
Summary of riding results by turnout and vote share for winning candidate (vs 1994)
Riding and winning party			Turnout		Vote share	
Riding and winning party			%	Change (pp)	%	Change (pp)
Abitibi-Est	PQ	Hold	74.27	-1.43	50.85	-3.65
Abitibi-Ouest	PQ	Hold	74.39	0.57	59.48	-14.89
Acadie	PLQ	Hold	78.05	-6.28	75.19	1.48
Anjou	PLQ	Gain	82.31	-3.22	44.51	0.74
Argenteuil	PLQ	Hold	78.29	-3.46	42.47	-0.12
Arthabaska	PQ	Hold	81.06	-0.17	53.69	-7.86
Beauce-Nord	PLQ	Hold	79.98	1.82	46.39	0.58
Beauce-Sud	PLQ	Hold	76.08	0.23	48.77	3.59
Beauharnois-Huntingdon	PLQ	Hold	81.32	-1.11	47.27	-4.49
Bellechasse	PQ	Hold	79.17	1.08	47.58	1.00
Berthier	PQ	Hold	79.51	-2.51	53.58	-0.08
Bertrand	PQ	Gain	77.38	-5.99	46.63	1.47
Blainville	PQ	Hold	82.82	-0.55	50.99	-0.41
Bonaventure	PLQ	Gain	75.63	-4.74	47.23	4.45
Borduas	PQ	Hold	83.50	-2.49	55.42	-0.42
Bourassa	PLQ	Hold	78.46	-4.83	53.92	4.01
Bourget	PQ	Hold	79.54	-4.90	47.73	2.32
Brome-Missisquoi	PLQ	Hold	80.56	-3.51	57.17	-3.95
Chambly	PQ	Hold	84.63	-2.83	52.51	3.64
Champlain	PQ	Hold	82.43	-1.21	47.29	5.03
Chapleau	PLQ	Hold	71.26	-3.38	59.22	-4.07
Charlesbourg	PQ	Hold	82.19	-2.53	41.00	-6.01
Charlevoix	PQ	Hold	76.49	0.15	56.60	4.02
Châteauguay	PLQ	Hold	84.18	-2.84	46.92	-4.36
Chauveau	PQ	Hold	78.60	-2.55	43.42	-3.13
Chicoutimi	PQ	Hold	74.82	-3.45	57.26	-6.29
Chomedey	PLQ	Hold	79.24	-2.94	69.87	2.17
Chutes-de-la-Chaudière	PQ	Hold	81.96	-0.92	49.62	-2.19
Crémazie	PQ	Hold	81.34	-4.69	45.35	-1.45
D'Arcy-McGee	PLQ	Hold	76.17	-8.28	90.61	25.24
Deux-Montagnes	PQ	Hold	81.08	-2.20	47.03	-1.31
Drummond	PQ	Hold	79.72	-0.70	52.35	5.81
Dubuc	PQ	Hold	74.69	-3.06	59.81	-3.69
Duplessis	PQ	Hold	69.44	-4.07	59.32	-0.68
Fabre	PQ	Hold	84.18	-2.37	45.95	1.65
Frontenac	PQ	Gain	82.12	-1.90	44.53	0.09
Gaspé	PQ	Hold	74.62	1.11	50.41	-2.97
Gatineau	PLQ	Hold	73.42	-4.53	61.53	-3.52
Gouin	PQ	Hold	74.40	-5.65	52.68	-3.74
Groulx	PQ	Hold	80.50	-2.58	48.51	2.40
Hochelaga-Maisonneuve	PQ	Hold	68.01	-7.53	60.61	-4.17
Hull	PLQ	Hold	70.87	-7.46	59.30	2.74
Iberville	PQ	Hold	81.28	-1.68	47.03	3.62
Îles-de-la-Madeleine	PQ	Gain	87.57	1.17	52.54	12.53
Jacques-Cartier	PLQ	Hold	79.62	-8.50	83.67	0.02
Jeanne-Mance	PLQ	Hold	79.21	-2.31	77.31	3.09
Jean-Talon	PLQ	Hold	85.04	-3.90	45.33	1.43
Johnson	PQ	Hold	80.96	-0.17	48.33	-1.45
Joliette	PQ	Hold	80.69	-3.15	56.15	-8.56
Jonquière	PQ	Hold	76.91	-3.13	60.48	-8.95
Kamouraska-Témiscouata	PLQ	Hold	74.72	1.42	43.49	0.80
La Peltrie	PQ	Hold	84.37	-1.13	46.44	-2.83
Labelle	PQ	Hold	76.01	-2.26	58.61	-7.17
Lac-Saint-Jean	PQ	Hold	76.78	-1.80	70.56	-1.11
LaFontaine	PLQ	Hold	80.06	-2.81	57.59	1.92
La Pinière	PLQ	Hold	80.70	-5.14	60.73	-1.95
Laporte	PLQ	Hold	80.28	-4.88	52.85	-4.95
La Prairie	PQ	Hold	82.78	-2.43	50.59	-4.76
L'Assomption	PQ	Hold	81.79	-3.81	51.50	-4.54
Laurier-Dorion	PLQ	Hold	76.21	-5.44	56.70	1.17
Laval-des-Rapides	PQ	Hold	78.85	-3.83	45.49	-1.37
Laviolette	PQ	Hold	79.07	0.41	54.13	-9.41
Lévis	PQ	Hold	79.92	-2.19	49.10	-23.16
Limoilou	PLQ	Gain	75.22	-3.94	42.34	11.12
Lotbinière	PQ	Hold	81.46	0.58	47.64	2.08
Louis-Hébert	PQ	Hold	80.88	-4.98	46.13	6.76
Marguerite-Bourgeoys	PLQ	Hold	79.93	-6.14	68.15	-2.19
Marguerite-D'Youville	PQ	Hold	86.67	-0.48	54.28	-3.75
Marie-Victorin	PQ	Hold	75.23	-5.10	51.68	-4.51
Marquette	PLQ	Hold	77.82	-5.75	56.45	1.39
Maskinongé	PQ	Hold	80.62	-1.10	48.15	0.59
Masson	PQ	Hold	60.15	-22.56	64.03	-0.16
Matane	PQ	Hold	72.97	-3.99	57.63	3.03
Matapédia	PQ	Hold	74.40	-1.79	57.47	-1.01
Mégantic-Compton	PLQ	Hold	79.89	-1.14	50.49	-3.46
Mercier	PQ	Hold	75.28	-5.06	55.38	-1.09
Mille-Îles	PQ	Hold	84.39	-2.48	43.61	-2.07
Montmagny-L'Islet	PLQ	Hold	75.32	0.30	45.99	1.64
Montmorency	PQ	Hold	80.73	-0.01	45.16	-10.58
Mont-Royal	PLQ	Hold	72.77	-7.30	80.24	-0.17
Nelligan	PLQ	Hold	79.91	-6.33	75.67	-1.49
Nicolet-Yamaska	PQ	Hold	84.59	-0.26	50.23	0.11
Notre-Dame-de-Grâce	PLQ	Hold	73.92	-9.27	77.62	4.54
Orford	PLQ	Hold	81.32	-1.47	50.96	-0.11
Outremont	PLQ	Hold	73.79	-8.33	58.31	-3.80
Papineau	PLQ	Hold	74.93	-6.04	54.78	1.10
Pointe-aux-Trembles	PQ	Hold	78.79	-3.67	53.83	0.06
Pontiac	PLQ	Hold	74.59	-6.31	75.27	-4.91
Portneuf	PQ	Hold	80.70	0.90	47.98	0.10
Prévost	PQ	Hold	77.89	-3.42	53.43	2.91
Richelieu	PQ	Hold	80.99	-2.24	56.31	1.22
Richmond	PLQ	Hold	81.90	-2.21	53.06	-1.22
Rimouski	PQ	Hold	75.43	-2.90	56.36	4.91
Rivière-du-Loup	ADQ	Hold	76.80	-6.85	46.34	-8.43
Robert-Baldwin	PLQ	Hold	78.06	-7.10	84.08	1.10
Roberval	PQ	Hold	73.12	-2.04	59.95	-0.13
Rosemont	PQ	Hold	77.36	-6.35	47.95	-1.31
Rousseau	PQ	Hold	75.94	-1.72	55.35	1.50
Rouyn-Noranda–Témiscamingue	PQ	Hold	76.25	-1.51	49.29	-9.33
Saguenay	PQ	Hold	69.47	-3.00	62.64	5.20
Saint-François	PLQ	Hold	79.60	-2.59	51.00	1.52
Saint-Henri-Sainte-Anne	PLQ	Hold	73.75	-7.46	48.35	0.39
Saint-Hyacinthe	PQ	Hold	81.74	-0.79	49.60	4.66
Saint-Jean	PQ	Hold	81.23	4.70	47.08	3.29
Saint-Laurent	PLQ	Hold	76.78	-5.05	78.03	1.30
Saint-Maurice	PQ	Hold	80.68	-3.57	49.52	2.14
Sainte-Marie–Saint-Jacques	PQ	Hold	67.51	-7.56	52.94	-1.79
Salaberry-Soulanges	PQ	Hold	82.99	-2.38	51.82	3.54
Sauvé	PLQ	Hold	76.27	-4.00	58.45	4.60
Shefford	PLQ	Hold	80.62	-0.60	37.28	-8.43
Sherbrooke	PLQ	Gain	79.74	-2.54	47.41	4.56
Taillon	PQ	Hold	77.95	-3.84	53.02	-7.97
Taschereau	PQ	Hold	73.84	-4.94	47.00	-4.87
Terrebonne	PQ	Hold	81.03	-2.17	59.47	-0.92
Trois-Rivières	PQ	Hold	78.91	-3.04	46.31	3.07
Ungava	PQ	Hold	61.93	10.11	48.22	-5.97
Vachon	PQ	Hold	81.85	-2.53	49.75	0.88
Vanier	PQ	Hold	77.80	-2.59	43.58	-5.91
Vaudreuil	PLQ	Hold	81.79	-5.40	51.92	-7.58
Verchères	PQ	Hold	83.22	0.11	60.64	2.86
Verdun	PLQ	Hold	75.70	-6.19	52.76	-1.81
Viau	PLQ	Hold	73.54	-6.19	70.08	6.89
Viger	PLQ	Hold	80.30	-3.81	64.80	0.53
Vimont	PQ	Hold	84.69	-1.75	45.39	0.51
Westmount-Saint-Louis	PLQ	Hold	66.26	-11.61	79.17	-0.03

=== Analysis ===
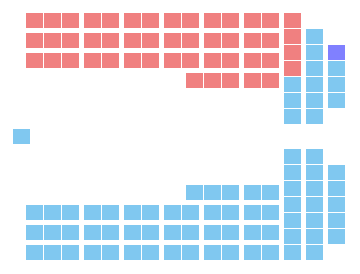
Seating arrangement in the 36th National Assembly

Party candidates in 2nd place
Party in 1st place	Party in 2nd place				Total
Party in 1st place	PQ	Lib	ADQ	Eq	Total
Parti Québécois		75	1		76
Liberal	46		1	1	48
Action démocratique	1				1
Total	47	75	2	1	125

Candidates ranked 1st to 5th place, by party
Parties	1st	2nd	3rd	4th	5th
█ Parti Québécois	76	47	1		
█ Liberal	48	75	2		
█ Action démocratique	1	2	117	5	
█ Equality		1	3	12	1
█ Bloc Pot			1	17	6
█ Independent			1	9	14
█ Socialist Democracy				56	33
█ Natural Law				7	14
█ Parti innovateur du Québec				2	7
█ Marxist–Leninist				2	5
█ Communist				2	3

Resulting composition of the 36th Quebec Legislative Assembly
Source		Party			
Source		PQ	Lib	ADQ	Total
Seats retained	Incumbents returned	61	37	1	99
Seats retained	Open seats held	11	7		18
Seats retained	Ouster of incumbent changing allegiance	1			1
Seats changing hands	Incumbents defeated	2	4		6
Seats changing hands	Open seats gained	1			1
Total		76	48	1	125

== Opinion polls ==

Voting intentions among French speakers

Voting intentions among non-French speakers

== See also ==
- Liste de sondages sur les élections générales québécoises de 1998 Opinion polling for the 1998 Quebec general election
- List of Quebec political parties
- List of Quebec premiers
- Politics of Quebec
- Timeline of Quebec history
- 36th National Assembly of Quebec
