= Candidates in the 2026 Quebec general election =

MNAs candidates in the 2026 Quebec general election
- October 5, 2026

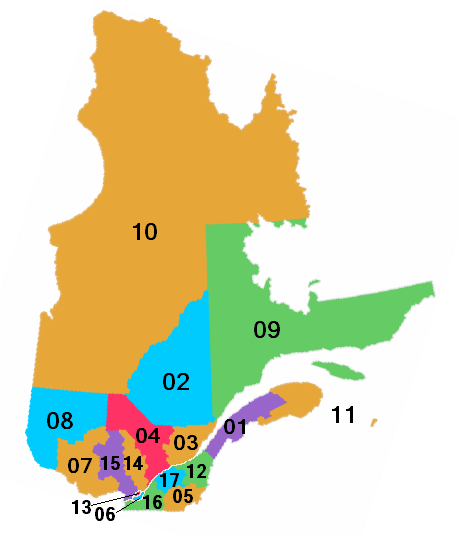

The following tables list the MNAs candidates in the 2026 Quebec general election in the 127 electoral districts, sorted by administrative region.

== Number of candidates ==
Candidates for the 2026 Quebec general election 127 seats in the National Assembly of Quebec
Party	Candidates
Équipe Christine Fréchette - Coalition avenir Québec	127
Quebec Liberal Party	127
Québec solidaire	127
Parti Québécois	127
Parti conservateur du Québec	127
Climat Québec - Équipe Martine Ouellet	52
Parti nul	38
Green Party of Quebec	37
Canadian Party of Quebec	29
Démocratie directe	28
Independent candidates	19
Présence Québec	18
Parti marxiste-léniniste du Québec	12
Parti communiste du Québec	10
Équipe autonomiste	8
Parti accès propriété et équité - Équipe Québec debout	6
Bloc pot	5
Parti culinaire du Québec	4
Parti libertarien du Québec	3
Québec innovant	2
Osons Québec	2
Total	908

== Abbreviations guide ==
Abbreviations of political affiliations used in these tables:

- aut. – Équipe autonomiste
- Canadian – Canadian Party of Quebec
- CAQ – Équipe Christine Fréchette - Coalition avenir Québec
- Climat – Climat Québec - Équipe Martine Ouellet
- com. – Parti communiste du Québec
- cul. – Parti culinaire du Québec
- DD – Démocratie directe
- Green – Green Party of Quebec
- ind. – independent candidate
- Liberal – Quebec Liberal Party
- libert. – Parti libertarien du Québec
- ML – Parti marxiste-léniniste du Québec
- ND – No designation
- nul – Parti nul
- OQ – Osons Québec
- PAPÉ – Parti accès propriété et équité - Équipe Québec debout
- PCQ – Parti conservateur du Québec
- pot – Bloc pot
- PQ – Parti Québécois
- Présence – Présence Québec
- QI – Québec innovant
- QS – Québec solidaire

Bold indicates a party leader.
~~Strikethrough~~ indicates a person that has been disqualified or withdrew.
† indicates that the incumbent is not seeking re-election.
§ indicates that the incumbent is seeking reelection in another district.

The source for all candidates is the official list of candidates published by Élections Québec.

== Bas-Saint-Laurent (01) ==
Electoral district	Candidates								Incumbent
Electoral district	CAQ	Liberal	QS	PQ	PCQ	Climat	Parti nul	DD	Incumbent
Matane-Matapédia-Mitis	Henry Maclaren	André Côté	Gabriel Plante	Pascal Bérubé	Patrice Caron		Alexandre Mari0 Br0s Cossette	Michel Lefrancois	Pascal Bérubé
Rimouski	Julia Brillant-Ruest	Michel Bienvenu	Virginie Chevalier-Archambault	Yohann St-Pierre	Cédric Gauthier	Gilles Gagné	Thomas Guay-Vachon		Maïté Blanchette Vézina §
Rivière-du-Loup–Témiscouata–Les Basques	Amélie Dionne	Karine Malenfant	Pierre-Erik Isabelle	Ariane Boyer	Louise Moreault	Carole Sierpien			Amélie Dionne

== Saguenay–Lac-Saint-Jean (02) ==
Electoral district	Candidates							Incumbent
Electoral district	CAQ	Liberal	QS	PQ	PCQ	Climat	Other	Incumbent
Chicoutimi	Sandra Larouche	Jean-Marc Allard	Jeanne Palardy	Marie-Karlynn Laflamme	Gabriella-Myriam Mathieu	Olivier Dion	Charles Olivier (libert.)	Marie-Karlynn Laflamme
Dubuc	Marc Grandbois	Virginie Bouchard	Ève Laguë	Émile Simard	Catherine Morissette		Joelle Lavallée (Présence)	François Tremblay †
Jonquière	Yannick Gagnon	Wilda Solon	Serge Bergeron	Jimmy Bouchard	Yannick Pelletier	Marc Lavoie		Yannick Gagnon
Lac-Saint-Jean	François Cormier	Anne Pâquet	Antoine Bessette	William Fradette	Tommy Gauthier	Sylvain Tremblay	Stefany Tremblay (Présence)	Éric Girard †
Roberval	Yanick Baillargeon	Serge Bergeron	Guillaume David	Isabelle Thibeault	Pierre Gagné			Nancy Guillemette †

== Capitale-Nationale (03) ==
Electoral district	Candidates								Incumbent
Electoral district	CAQ	Liberal	QS	PQ	PCQ	Climat	Parti nul	Other	Incumbent
Charlesbourg	Marie-Josée Morency	Seynabou Top	Georges Goma	Gabriel Coulombe	Éloïse Coulombe		Amelia Alexandrescu	Leopold Toko Simo (PAPÉ)	Jonatan Julien †
Charlevoix–Côte-de-Beaupré	Kariane Bourassa	Michel Bureau	Dulce Vivar	François Gariépy	Caroline Simard			James Collins (DD)	Kariane Bourassa
Charlevoix–Côte-de-Beaupré	Kariane Bourassa	Michel Bureau	Dulce Vivar	François Gariépy	Caroline Simard			Mario Desjardins Pelchat (PAPÉ)	Kariane Bourassa
Chauveau	Christian Lachance	John McGrath	Émilie Couture	Mathieu Foltz	Karim Elayoubi		William Beaudry		Sylvain Lévesque †
Jean-Lesage	Nathalie St-Pierre	Gertrude Bourdon	Sol Zanetti	Claude Villeneuve	Nancy Joannette	Mario Ledoux	Geneviève Dorval	Claude Moreau (ML)	Sol Zanetti
Jean-Lesage	Nathalie St-Pierre	Gertrude Bourdon	Sol Zanetti	Claude Villeneuve	Nancy Joannette	Mario Ledoux	Geneviève Dorval	Nicolas Thériault (aut.)	Sol Zanetti
Jean-Talon	William Denis	Julie White	Sonia Tchuembou	Pascal Paradis	Jesse Robitaille		Anne Rufiange	Claudiu Bell (aut.)	Pascal Paradis
Jean-Talon	William Denis	Julie White	Sonia Tchuembou	Pascal Paradis	Jesse Robitaille		Anne Rufiange	Robert Dubé (DD)	Pascal Paradis
Jean-Talon	William Denis	Julie White	Sonia Tchuembou	Pascal Paradis	Jesse Robitaille		Anne Rufiange	Mehdi Lahlou (Green)	Pascal Paradis
La Peltrie	Véronique Laprise	Alain Chandonnet	Frédéric Aubé	Julie Vignola	Maïté Blanchette Vézina	Martin Grand'Maison	Emilie Roberge-Boily		Éric Caire †
Louis-Hébert	Marc-Antoine Bernier	Richard Bélanger	Anne-Sophie Roy	Chloé Fauchon	Marcos Archambault			Vincent Bégin (ind.)	Geneviève Guilbault †
Louis-Hébert	Marc-Antoine Bernier	Richard Bélanger	Anne-Sophie Roy	Chloé Fauchon	Marcos Archambault			Jean-François Grenier (Présence)	Geneviève Guilbault †
Montmorency	Jean-François Simard	René-Paul Coly	Annie-Pierre Bélanger	Nathalie Gagnon	Marie-Josée Hélie		Renaud Blais	Jean Bédard (ML)	Jean-François Simard
Montmorency	Jean-François Simard	René-Paul Coly	Annie-Pierre Bélanger	Nathalie Gagnon	Marie-Josée Hélie		Renaud Blais	Pierre Gosselin (PAPÉ)	Jean-François Simard
Portneuf	Vincent Caron	Jeremy Ouellet-Rousseau	Anne-Marie Melançon	Raymond Francoeur	Marcel Bouchard	Jean Cloutier	Marc-André Demers	Michaël Bernatchez (DD)	Vincent Caron
Taschereau	Brigitte Martin	Farnell Morisset	Étienne Grandmont	Christian Savard	Eliot Estévez-Verville	Jean-François Joubert		Guy Boivin (aut.)	Étienne Grandmont
Taschereau	Brigitte Martin	Farnell Morisset	Étienne Grandmont	Christian Savard	Eliot Estévez-Verville	Jean-François Joubert		Patrick Kerr (ind.)	Étienne Grandmont
Vanier-Les Rivières	Françoise Faverjon-Fortin	Charles Hudon	Karoline Boucher	Stéphanie Martin	Patrick Paquet	Marjolaine Pépin	Marjorie Villeneuve	Kathia Poliquin (DD)	Mario Asselin †

== Mauricie (04) ==
Electoral district	Candidates								Incumbent
Electoral district	CAQ	Liberal	QS	PQ	PCQ	Climat	DD	Other	Incumbent
Champlain	Marie-Ève Myrand	Annie Pronovost	Katherine Heckersbruch	René Branchaud	Adriana Szalontai	Martine Ouellet	Christine Dion	Lionel Bonhomet (nul)	Sonia LeBel †
Laviolette–Saint-Maurice	Guy Veillette	Laurent Bélisle	Rébéka Frédette	Élodie Murphy-Gauthier	Charles Paquin	Hugo Laperrière Piché	Stéphane Gélinas	Jean-Patrick Berthiaume (pot)	Marie-Louise Tardif †
Maskinongé	Simon Allaire	Nancy Mignault	Simon Piotte	Isabelle Blais	Marc-André Cloutier	Louise Gosselin	Claude Ladouceur	Gilles Brodeur (ind.)	Simon Allaire
Maskinongé	Simon Allaire	Nancy Mignault	Simon Piotte	Isabelle Blais	Marc-André Cloutier	Louise Gosselin	Claude Ladouceur	Jérôme Dumont (nul)	Simon Allaire
Trois-Rivières	Christine Fréchette	Valérie Renaud-Martin	Steven Roy Cullen	Jean Pellerin	Jonathan Couturier	Nancy Nadon		Jean Gagnon Savard (pot)	Jean Boulet †
Trois-Rivières	Christine Fréchette	Valérie Renaud-Martin	Steven Roy Cullen	Jean Pellerin	Jonathan Couturier	Nancy Nadon		Béatrice Lafontaine (nul)	Jean Boulet †

== Estrie (05) ==
Electoral district	Candidates								Incumbent
Electoral district	CAQ	Liberal	QS	PQ	PCQ	Climat	Présence	Other	Incumbent
Brome-Missisquoi	Manuela Goya	Frédéric Beauchemin	Michelle Corcos	Patrick Melchior	David Alarie		Ganaëlle Roy	Michelle Julien (Canadian)	Isabelle Charest †
Brome-Missisquoi	Manuela Goya	Frédéric Beauchemin	Michelle Corcos	Patrick Melchior	David Alarie		Ganaëlle Roy	Frédérique Marseille (nul)	Isabelle Charest †
Daniel-Johnson	Christine Nadeau	Eric Sévigny	Tony Martel	Nathalie Boisclair	Marc Distexhe				André Lamontagne †
Granby	Claudine Leroux	Claudie Bérubé	Méliane St-Amand	Jean-François Arsenault	Marc-Antoine Huet-Mailly			Jimmy Paquin (aut.)	François Bonnardel †
Granby	Claudine Leroux	Claudie Bérubé	Méliane St-Amand	Jean-François Arsenault	Marc-Antoine Huet-Mailly			Andrzej Wisniowski (Green)	François Bonnardel †
Mégantic	François Jacques	Sylvain Houle	Marilyn Ouellet	Debbie Fennety	Jimmy Gagnon	Marie-Michèle Boutet		Claude Jr Tremblay (DD)	François Jacques
Orford	Allison Turner	Charles Milliard	Eve-Lyne Clusiault	Jocelyn Caron	Benoit Robitaille	Madeleine Smith	Lucie Pinard	David Cherniak (nul)	Gilles Bélanger †
Orford	Allison Turner	Charles Milliard	Eve-Lyne Clusiault	Jocelyn Caron	Benoit Robitaille	Madeleine Smith	Lucie Pinard	Ngaire DeNora (Canadian)	Gilles Bélanger †
Richmond	Guillaume Rousseau	Hugo Fontaine	David Poulin-Latulippe	Bernard Sévigny	Dominic Bouffard	Pierre-Olivier Lassonde	Alexane Roy	Christophe Duret (ind.)	André Bachand †
Saint-François	Geneviève Hébert	Jacqueline Belleau	Mia Fréchette	Sylvie Tanguay	Esteban Méndez-Hord	Rémi Tétreault	Sylvie Peloquin		Geneviève Hébert
Sherbrooke	Fadéla Hamou	Pierre Cossette	Stéphanie Vachon	Gabriel Pallotta	Jonathan Brault	Patrick Thouin	Pierre-Luc Garon	Jean-Michel Bérard (libert.)	Christine Labrie †
Sherbrooke	Fadéla Hamou	Pierre Cossette	Stéphanie Vachon	Gabriel Pallotta	Jonathan Brault	Patrick Thouin	Pierre-Luc Garon	Léo Boivin (com.)	Christine Labrie †
Sherbrooke	Fadéla Hamou	Pierre Cossette	Stéphanie Vachon	Gabriel Pallotta	Jonathan Brault	Patrick Thouin	Pierre-Luc Garon	Luc Lainé (DD)	Christine Labrie †

== Montréal (06) ==
=== East ===
Electoral district	Candidates								Incumbent
Electoral district	CAQ	Liberal	QS	PQ	PCQ	Climat	Parti nul	Other	Incumbent
Anjou–Louis-Riel	Karine Boivin Roy	Nicolas Plourde	Edissya Boukrif	Younès Dadoun	Helder Da Costa Leitao	Claude Gélinas	Francis Desjardins		Karine Boivin Roy
Bourassa-Sauvé	Isabelle Lamy	Madwa-Nika Cadet	Mara Hermione Pierre	Edline Henri	Ismaila Marega			Joseph Wa Ngoie Ngoie (ind.)	Madwa-Nika Cadet
Camille-Laurin	Matys Lavigne	Earl Corales	René Gauvreau	Paul St-Pierre Plamondon	Jessy Comtois	Benoît Dupont	Chantal Poulin	Louis Chandonnet (aut.)	Paul St-Pierre Plamondon
Gouin	Frank Tremblay	Hoang Annie Nguyen	Alexandre Boulerice	Isabelle Daoust	Edouard Prud'homme	Jean-Claude Saint-André	Elizabeth Laferrière	Camille Jannard (Green)	Gabriel Nadeau-Dubois †
Gouin	Frank Tremblay	Hoang Annie Nguyen	Alexandre Boulerice	Isabelle Daoust	Edouard Prud'homme	Jean-Claude Saint-André	Elizabeth Laferrière	Charles McNicoll (aut.)	Gabriel Nadeau-Dubois †
Hochelaga-Maisonneuve	Béatrice Hodonou	Janny Gaspard	Alexandre Leduc	Maude Brossard Sabourin	Elena Penta		Raphaëlle Dompierre	Fajr Al-sayed (Green)	Alexandre Leduc
Hochelaga-Maisonneuve	Béatrice Hodonou	Janny Gaspard	Alexandre Leduc	Maude Brossard Sabourin	Elena Penta		Raphaëlle Dompierre	Christine Dandenault (ML)	Alexandre Leduc
Hochelaga-Maisonneuve	Béatrice Hodonou	Janny Gaspard	Alexandre Leduc	Maude Brossard Sabourin	Elena Penta		Raphaëlle Dompierre	Charles Rouillard (DD)	Alexandre Leduc
Hochelaga-Maisonneuve	Béatrice Hodonou	Janny Gaspard	Alexandre Leduc	Maude Brossard Sabourin	Elena Penta		Raphaëlle Dompierre	Igor Sadikov (com.)	Alexandre Leduc
Jeanne-Mance–Viger	Ernest Denon	Filomena Rotiroti	Dalila Assefsaf	Adnane Najahi	Chakib Saad			Younes Gouriny (Green)	Filomena Rotiroti
Jeanne-Mance–Viger	Ernest Denon	Filomena Rotiroti	Dalila Assefsaf	Adnane Najahi	Chakib Saad			Djaouida Sellah (Canadian)	Filomena Rotiroti
LaFontaine	Guepsly Florvil	Marc Tanguay	Kim Fontaine	Joyd Rolkins Daréus	Andréanne Bareil			David Cox (Green)	Marc Tanguay
LaFontaine	Guepsly Florvil	Marc Tanguay	Kim Fontaine	Joyd Rolkins Daréus	Andréanne Bareil			Giovanni Manfredi (Canadian)	Marc Tanguay
Laurier-Dorion	Emil Parfyonov	Randy Legault-Rankin	Andrés Fontecilla	Kelly Lazo de la Vega	Marc-Antoine Cusson	Louis Poirier	Mathieu Marcil	Stéphane Doucet (com.)	Andrés Fontecilla
Laurier-Dorion	Emil Parfyonov	Randy Legault-Rankin	Andrés Fontecilla	Kelly Lazo de la Vega	Marc-Antoine Cusson	Louis Poirier	Mathieu Marcil	Jenifer Gomes (Canadian)	Andrés Fontecilla
Laurier-Dorion	Emil Parfyonov	Randy Legault-Rankin	Andrés Fontecilla	Kelly Lazo de la Vega	Marc-Antoine Cusson	Louis Poirier	Mathieu Marcil	Olivier Lamanque Galarneau (DD)	Andrés Fontecilla
Laurier-Dorion	Emil Parfyonov	Randy Legault-Rankin	Andrés Fontecilla	Kelly Lazo de la Vega	Marc-Antoine Cusson	Louis Poirier	Mathieu Marcil	Jean-Louis Thémis (cul.)	Andrés Fontecilla
Maurice-Richard	Georges Chartier	Nada Boumeftah	Anne Latendresse	Aisha Issa	Mercidieu Doréus		Isaac Varin		Haroun Bouazzi †
Mercier	Kelly-Anne Gagné	Thierno Diallo	Ruba Ghazal	Phoudsady Vanny	François Plamondon	Jogues Sauriol	Jenny Cartwright	Jocelyn Simon Daigle (ind.)	Ruba Ghazal
Mercier	Kelly-Anne Gagné	Thierno Diallo	Ruba Ghazal	Phoudsady Vanny	François Plamondon	Jogues Sauriol	Jenny Cartwright	Michelle Paquette (com.)	Ruba Ghazal
Mercier	Kelly-Anne Gagné	Thierno Diallo	Ruba Ghazal	Phoudsady Vanny	François Plamondon	Jogues Sauriol	Jenny Cartwright	Laurel Thompson (Green)	Ruba Ghazal
Pointe-aux-Trembles	Chantal Rouleau	Naïma Marylene Indira Som	Mégane Charron	Stéphane Paquet	Maxim Tremblay		Maude Chapdelaine	Daniel Lasalle (aut.)	Chantal Rouleau
Pointe-aux-Trembles	Chantal Rouleau	Naïma Marylene Indira Som	Mégane Charron	Stéphane Paquet	Maxim Tremblay		Maude Chapdelaine	Geneviève Royer (ML)	Chantal Rouleau
Rosemont	Nour Aliyah Attié	David Lavoie	Gisèle Pouhe Njall	Pierre-Luc Brillant	Mildred Mathieu	Thierry Paquin		Jean Duval (ind.)	Vincent Marissal †
Sainte-Marie–Saint-Jacques	Eli Zytoon	Justine McIntyre	Roxane Milot	Philippe Schnobb	Antoine Corminboeuf	Dominique Blanchard	Rachël Frenette	Chinook Blais-Leduc (pot)	Manon Massé †
Sainte-Marie–Saint-Jacques	Eli Zytoon	Justine McIntyre	Roxane Milot	Philippe Schnobb	Antoine Corminboeuf	Dominique Blanchard	Rachël Frenette	Justin Bouchard (cul.)	Manon Massé †
Sainte-Marie–Saint-Jacques	Eli Zytoon	Justine McIntyre	Roxane Milot	Philippe Schnobb	Antoine Corminboeuf	Dominique Blanchard	Rachël Frenette	Linda Sullivan (ML)	Manon Massé †
Sainte-Marie–Saint-Jacques	Eli Zytoon	Justine McIntyre	Roxane Milot	Philippe Schnobb	Antoine Corminboeuf	Dominique Blanchard	Rachël Frenette	Adrien Welsh (com.)	Manon Massé †
Sainte-Marie–Saint-Jacques	Eli Zytoon	Justine McIntyre	Roxane Milot	Philippe Schnobb	Antoine Corminboeuf	Dominique Blanchard	Rachël Frenette	Lina Zdruli (Green)	Manon Massé †
Viau	Frane Bisseck	Frantz Benjamin	Saïd Kassabie	Clara Bélisle	Venel Aladin		Renaud Boisvert	Mario Bellavance (ind.)	Frantz Benjamin
Viau	Frane Bisseck	Frantz Benjamin	Saïd Kassabie	Clara Bélisle	Venel Aladin		Renaud Boisvert	Manel Chaouche (Green)	Frantz Benjamin
Viau	Frane Bisseck	Frantz Benjamin	Saïd Kassabie	Clara Bélisle	Venel Aladin		Renaud Boisvert	Afruza Hossain (Canadian)	Frantz Benjamin
Viau	Frane Bisseck	Frantz Benjamin	Saïd Kassabie	Clara Bélisle	Venel Aladin		Renaud Boisvert	Normand Raymond (com.)	Frantz Benjamin

=== West ===
Electoral district	Candidates								Incumbent
Electoral district	CAQ	Liberal	QS	PQ	PCQ	Green	Canadian	Other	Incumbent
Acadie	Christian Gnali	André Albert Morin	Marie-Laurence Nault	Pierrick Jasmin	Amine Difallah	Ahmad Elmawieh	Roula Al-Nseir	Elizabeth Dupuis (nul)	André Albert Morin
D'Arcy-McGee	Junlian Leblanc	Elisabeth Prass	Lucian Costin	Maïté Larouche	Adrien Pouliot	Gavin Zheng	Joyce Stoliar Shanks	Diane Johnston (ML)	Elisabeth Prass
D'Arcy-McGee	Junlian Leblanc	Elisabeth Prass	Lucian Costin	Maïté Larouche	Adrien Pouliot	Gavin Zheng	Joyce Stoliar Shanks	Guillaume Massie-Hamel (nul)	Elisabeth Prass
Jacques-Cartier	Santiago Proteau Sanchez	Gregory Kelley	Gabriel Laurence-Brook	Céline Dauphinais	Pina Di Dio	Bianca Jitaru	Yesica Ochoa		Gregory Kelley
Marguerite-Bourgeoys	Adam Ahmad	Michel Leblanc	Bryan Gingras	Luc Côté	Sean Ross	Sam Kühn		Ingénieur Hu (PAPÉ)	Frédéric Beauchemin §
Marquette	Mahsa Barani	Enrico Ciccone	Pascal Malo	Guillaume de Palma-Demers	Richard Zilversmit	Rachid Jemmah	Alexandre Pendenza		Enrico Ciccone
Mont-Royal–Outremont	Sarah Beaumier	Michelle Setlakwe	Marianne Locas-Ouimet	Ariane Bureau	Yaron Avsker	Mathias Mackowiak	Sonia Moscote	Gia Rose (com.)	Michelle Setlakwe
Nelligan	Tom Tang	Monsef Derraji	Dominique Naud	Martine Dubois	Gary Charles	Alex Di Pardo	Michael Wilkinson		Monsef Derraji
Notre-Dame-de-Grâce	Kaan Altintas	Désirée McGraw	Élise Davignon	Vincent Hubert	Guillaume St-Pierre	Alex Tyrrell	Christian Turgeon	Ivan Byard (com.)	Désirée McGraw
Notre-Dame-de-Grâce	Kaan Altintas	Désirée McGraw	Élise Davignon	Vincent Hubert	Guillaume St-Pierre	Alex Tyrrell	Christian Turgeon	Rachel Hoffman (ML)	Désirée McGraw
Robert-Baldwin	Sophie Leroux	Brigitte Garceau	Alexandra Lacoste	Maurice Daude	Axel Lellouche	Hélène Savard	Paul Henry Danylewich		Brigitte Garceau
Saint-Henri–Sainte-Anne	Anthony Lavoie	Benoit Clermont	Guillaume Cliche-Rivard	Caroline Julie Fortin	Edouard Stephan Valdescault	Jean-Pierre Duford		Laura Champagne (QI)	Guillaume Cliche-Rivard
Saint-Laurent	Tahmina Kabir	Valérie Assouline	Étienne Loiselle-Schiettekatte	Pierre-Étienne Nantel	Barry Rolbin	Pierre-Christophe Dagher Falardeau	Audrey Baillairgé	Fernand Deschamps (ML)	Marwah Rizqy †
Saint-Laurent	Tahmina Kabir	Valérie Assouline	Étienne Loiselle-Schiettekatte	Pierre-Étienne Nantel	Barry Rolbin	Pierre-Christophe Dagher Falardeau	Audrey Baillairgé	Joe Young (ind.)	Marwah Rizqy †
Verdun	Roseline Olory	Antoine Dionne-Charest	Alejandra Zaga Mendez	Elena Kozynchenko	Lucien Koty	Victoria Shahsavar-Arshad	Abdur Rashid	Marina Cabrera (ind.)	Alejandra Zaga Mendez
Verdun	Roseline Olory	Antoine Dionne-Charest	Alejandra Zaga Mendez	Elena Kozynchenko	Lucien Koty	Victoria Shahsavar-Arshad	Abdur Rashid	Normand Chouinard (ML)	Alejandra Zaga Mendez
Verdun	Roseline Olory	Antoine Dionne-Charest	Alejandra Zaga Mendez	Elena Kozynchenko	Lucien Koty	Victoria Shahsavar-Arshad	Abdur Rashid	Matthieu Deutté Brien (Climat)	Alejandra Zaga Mendez
Verdun	Roseline Olory	Antoine Dionne-Charest	Alejandra Zaga Mendez	Elena Kozynchenko	Lucien Koty	Victoria Shahsavar-Arshad	Abdur Rashid	Manuel Johnson (com.)	Alejandra Zaga Mendez
Verdun	Roseline Olory	Antoine Dionne-Charest	Alejandra Zaga Mendez	Elena Kozynchenko	Lucien Koty	Victoria Shahsavar-Arshad	Abdur Rashid	Marc-André Ouellette (QI)	Alejandra Zaga Mendez
Verdun	Roseline Olory	Antoine Dionne-Charest	Alejandra Zaga Mendez	Elena Kozynchenko	Lucien Koty	Victoria Shahsavar-Arshad	Abdur Rashid	Max Richard (pot)	Alejandra Zaga Mendez
Westmount–Saint-Louis	Karim Abi Haila	Jennifer Maccarone	Olivier Sylvestre	Victoria Piscina	Guy Diotte	Hailey Roop	Maryam Kamali Nezhad	Marc A. Lefebvre (nul)	Jennifer Maccarone
Westmount–Saint-Louis	Karim Abi Haila	Jennifer Maccarone	Olivier Sylvestre	Victoria Piscina	Guy Diotte	Hailey Roop	Maryam Kamali Nezhad	Kaity Zozula (com.)	Jennifer Maccarone

== Outaouais (07) ==
Electoral district	Candidates							Incumbent
Electoral district	CAQ	Liberal	QS	PQ	PCQ	Canadian	Other	Incumbent
Chapleau	Mathieu Lévesque	Michel Langevin	Doryan Pansanel	Meixia Maltais	Denis Charron	Marcela Martinez	Olguine Michelle Louissaint (Green)	Mathieu Lévesque
Chapleau	Mathieu Lévesque	Michel Langevin	Doryan Pansanel	Meixia Maltais	Denis Charron	Marcela Martinez	Pierre Soublière (ML)	Mathieu Lévesque
Gatineau	William Robertson	David Logue	Emmanuelle Tremblay	Raphaël Déry	Ogbognon Bertin Aboussou		Pierre Brabant (Climat)	Robert Bussière †
Hull	Suzanne Tremblay	Sacha Cannon	Mariève Forest	Paul Fauteux	Anne-Marie Couturier	Danilo Velasquez		Suzanne Tremblay
Papineau	Linda Gauthier	Isabelle Sabourin	Benoit Renaud	Isabelle Millette	Michel Kadri		Julie Gomez (ind.)	Mathieu Lacombe †
Pontiac	Mariana Mefleh	André Fortin	Bianca Baldo	Marcela Cazas	Osmar Llanos Martinez	William Twolan		André Fortin

== Abitibi-Témiscamingue (08) ==
Electoral district	Candidates						Incumbent
Electoral district	CAQ	Liberal	QS	PQ	PCQ	Other	Incumbent
Abitibi-Est	Manon Barbe	Pierre Dufour	Sara Germain	Stéphane Tremblay	Jean-Philip Girard	Christian Savard (Climat)	Pierre Dufour
Abitibi-Ouest	Suzanne Blais	Marc-André Fortin	Joanie Bolduc	Sébastien D'Astous	Daniel Guillemette		Suzanne Blais
Rouyn-Noranda–Témiscamingue	Béatrice Déry	Leanne Loney	France Marion	Diane Dallaire	Francis Lapointe	Samuel Touchette (nul)	Daniel Bernard †

== Côte-Nord (09) ==
Electoral district	Candidates						Incumbent
Electoral district	CAQ	Liberal	QS	PQ	PCQ	Other	Incumbent
Duplessis	Kateri Champagne Jourdain	Samuel Murray	Jani Bellefleur-Kaltush	Meggie Richard	Roberto Stea	Alexandre Deschênes (ML)	Kateri Champagne Jourdain
René-Lévesque	Yves Montigny	William Huynh-Jan	Philippe C.-Boudreau	Odette Lavigne	Esther Besrest	Kevin Grenier (DD)	Yves Montigny

== Nord-du-Québec (10) ==
Electoral district	Candidates					Incumbent
Electoral district	CAQ	Liberal	QS	PQ	PCQ	Incumbent
Ungava	Amélie Béchard	Sandrine Rioux	Antoine Côté	Sonia Caron	Marc Damant	Denis Lamothe †

== Gaspésie–Îles-de-la-Madeleine (11) ==
Electoral district	Candidates						Incumbent
Electoral district	CAQ	Liberal	QS	PQ	PCQ	Parti nul	Incumbent
Bonaventure	Catherine Blouin	Christian Cyr	Yv Bonnier Viger	Pier-Luc Bujold	Dominique Côté		Catherine Blouin
Gaspé	Stéphane Sainte-Croix	Michel Marin	Emmanuelle Babin	Méganne Perry Mélançon	Christian Pierry		Stéphane Sainte-Croix
Îles-de-la-Madeleine	Linda Lebel	Gil Thériault	Zachary Jean	Joël Arseneau	Evan Leblanc	Mélodie Caron	Joël Arseneau

== Chaudière-Appalaches (12) ==
Electoral district	Candidates						Incumbent
Electoral district	CAQ	Liberal	QS	PQ	PCQ	Other	Incumbent
Beauce-Nord	Philippe Simard	Nancy Labbé	Julie Dionne	Éric Gagnon Poulin	Patricia Drouin	Pierre Larochelle (nul)	Luc Provençal †
Beauce-Sud	Samuel Poulin	Alvaro Peressutti	Amélie Carrier	Angèle Bouffard	Jonathan Poulin	Ginette Vien (DD)	Samuel Poulin
Bellechasse	Stéphanie Lachance	Richard Garon	Raphaël Bédard	Jérôme Couture	Éric Duhaime	Jean-Pierre Hamel (DD)	Stéphanie Lachance
Chutes-de-la-Chaudière	Martine Biron	Stéphane Clavet	Jean-Benoît Ouellet	Serge Bonin	Dominique Dumas	David Baillargeon (Présence)	Martine Biron
Chutes-de-la-Chaudière	Martine Biron	Stéphane Clavet	Jean-Benoît Ouellet	Serge Bonin	Dominique Dumas	Dominic Dumas (nul)	Martine Biron
Côte-du-Sud	Mathieu Rivest	Nancy St-Pierre	Jordan Veillette	Valérie Hamel	Frédéric Poulin		Mathieu Rivest
Lévis	Bernard Drainville	Brittany Blais	Simon Beauchamp-Léveillé	Yanick Godbout	Karine Laflamme	Pierre Germain (Climat)	Bernard Drainville
Lévis	Bernard Drainville	Brittany Blais	Simon Beauchamp-Léveillé	Yanick Godbout	Karine Laflamme	Yvan Tremblay (Présence)	Bernard Drainville
Lotbinière-Frontenac	Roch Gamache	Ludovic Beauregard	Elisabeth St-Aubin	Jonathan Moreau	Renaud Labrecque	Charles-Eugène Bergeron (Climat)	Isabelle Lecours †
Lotbinière-Frontenac	Roch Gamache	Ludovic Beauregard	Elisabeth St-Aubin	Jonathan Moreau	Renaud Labrecque	Violette L'Ecuyer (DD)	Isabelle Lecours †

== Laval (13) ==
Electoral district	Candidates							Incumbent
Electoral district	CAQ	Liberal	QS	PQ	PCQ	Green	Other	Incumbent
Chomedey	Cattiouceca Ambroise	Madeleine Féquière	Geru Schneider	Marie-Jeanne Rivest	Leon Der Stepanian		Jonathan Gray (Canadian)	Sona Lakhoyan Olivier
Chomedey	Cattiouceca Ambroise	Madeleine Féquière	Geru Schneider	Marie-Jeanne Rivest	Leon Der Stepanian		Sona Lakhoyan Olivier (ind.)	Sona Lakhoyan Olivier
Fabre	Lucie Létourneau	Marie Claude Fournier	Josée Chevalier	Catherine Dansereau-Redhead	Stéphane Turmel	Lynn Buchanan	Qaiser Choudhry (Canadian)	Alice Abou-Khalil †
Laval-des-Rapides	Vincent Bolduc	Caroline De Guire	Sabrina Di Matteo	Fatima Aboubakr	Ronny Niro	Patrick Truong	Shawn Lalande McLean (PAPÉ)	Céline Haytayan †
Mille-Îles	Sonia Amedome	Virginie Dufour	Zachary Robert	Mathieu Trottier-Kavanagh	Nare Stepanyan		Ludovic Mbany (OQ)	Virginie Dufour
Sainte-Rose	Christopher Skeete	Cécile Tremblay	Karine Cliche	Judith Cardin	Alexandre Arrata	Mustapha Jaalouk	Anne-Marie Tougas (Climat)	Christopher Skeete
Vimont-Auteuil	Valérie Schmaltz	Louis Ialenti	Stella Bourgon-Germain	Amin Ouazragh-Marchand	Mackenley Raphael	Pierrette Kamning Nguendjong	Chantale Bordeleau (nul)	Valérie Schmaltz

== Lanaudière (14) ==
Electoral district	Candidates							Incumbent
Electoral district	CAQ	Liberal	QS	PQ	PCQ	Climat	Other	Incumbent
Berthier	Alex Gagné	Louis-Victor Sylvestre	Amélie Drainville	Elsie Lefebvre	Steve Piché	Jean-Pierre Lacombe	Isabelle Lamothe (Présence)	Caroline Proulx †
Berthier	Alex Gagné	Louis-Victor Sylvestre	Amélie Drainville	Elsie Lefebvre	Steve Piché	Jean-Pierre Lacombe	Louis Jr Simard (DD)	Caroline Proulx †
Joliette	Clodine Desrochers	Sana Arfaoui	Flavie Trudel	Véronique Venne	Rémi Lafrenière	Sophie Sarrazin	David Chouinard (nul)	François St-Louis †
Joliette	Clodine Desrochers	Sana Arfaoui	Flavie Trudel	Véronique Venne	Rémi Lafrenière	Sophie Sarrazin	Boris Geynet (Green)	François St-Louis †
Joliette	Clodine Desrochers	Sana Arfaoui	Flavie Trudel	Véronique Venne	Rémi Lafrenière	Sophie Sarrazin	Xavie Jean-Bourgeault (Présence)	François St-Louis †
L'Assomption	Geneviève Pettersen	Marie-Claire Anglade	Benoit Bourbonnais	Maxime Laporte	Patrick Lemieux		William Mayeu (nul)	François Legault †
Masson	Anik Girard	Martin Gaulin	Stéphane Durupt	Stéphane Handfield	Benoit Lanoue			Mathieu Lemay †
Repentigny	Pascale Déry	Yvena Luc	Martin Lefebvre	Nicolas Girard	Vincent Côté		Shawn-Brandon Rimpel (Green)	Pascale Déry
Rousseau	Louis-Charles Thouin	Sashmir Sidney	Hind Rihani	Mathieu Lebrun	Marie-Ève Boucher			Louis-Charles Thouin
Terrebonne	Valérie Doyon	Ange Claude Bigilimana	Ariane Drainville	Catherine Gentilcore	Marianne Poirier	Benoit Beauchamp		Catherine Gentilcore

== Laurentides (15) ==
Electoral district	Candidates							Incumbent
Electoral district	CAQ	Liberal	QS	PQ	PCQ	Climat	Other	Incumbent
Argenteuil	Julie-Andrée Numainville	Émilie Jutras	Pénéloppe Dagenais-Lavoie	Pierre Nantel	Marie-France Lemay		Margaret Ethel Brunton (ind.)	Agnès Grondin †
Argenteuil	Julie-Andrée Numainville	Émilie Jutras	Pénéloppe Dagenais-Lavoie	Pierre Nantel	Marie-France Lemay		Martin Charron (OQ)	Agnès Grondin †
Argenteuil	Julie-Andrée Numainville	Émilie Jutras	Pénéloppe Dagenais-Lavoie	Pierre Nantel	Marie-France Lemay		Esber Khalil Esber (Canadian)	Agnès Grondin †
Argenteuil	Julie-Andrée Numainville	Émilie Jutras	Pénéloppe Dagenais-Lavoie	Pierre Nantel	Marie-France Lemay		Brigitte Roy (ind.)	Agnès Grondin †
Bellefeuille	Rachel Renaud	Maud Laporte-Roy	Normand Lalonde	Audrey Bujold	Pier-Luc Chayer			new district
Bertrand	France-Élaine Duranceau	Felipe Morales	Nataël Bureau	Alexandre Girard-Duchaine	Éliot Gallant		Jonathan Godin (DD)	France-Élaine Duranceau
Bertrand	France-Élaine Duranceau	Felipe Morales	Nataël Bureau	Alexandre Girard-Duchaine	Éliot Gallant		Guillaume Tremblay (Présence)	France-Élaine Duranceau
Blainville	Mario Laframboise	Sébastien Daoust	Louis Piette	Nadine Le Gal	Pascal Quevillon	Marie-Claude Archambault		Mario Laframboise
Deux-Montagnes	Christine Maestracci	Marc Allaire	Guillaume Ducharme	Linda Vaillant	Samuel Lévesque	Nicolas Riqueur-Lainé		Benoit Charette †
Groulx	Eric Girard	Julie Tourangeau	Marie-Noëlle Aubertin	Marie-Claude Sarrazin	Ariane Desrochers	Samuel Beauchamp		Eric Girard
Labelle	Chantal Roussel	Shawn Latulippe	Julie B. Savard	Catherine Drouin	Jean-François Frigon	Jean-Simon Boileau	Natacha Alarie (DD)	Chantale Jeannotte †
Labelle	Chantal Roussel	Shawn Latulippe	Julie B. Savard	Catherine Drouin	Jean-François Frigon	Jean-Simon Boileau	Pierre Boutin (Présence)	Chantale Jeannotte †
Les Plaines	Fatou Diop	Agathe Owona	Irène Dubé	Dieudonné Ella Oyono	Habib Diarra		Félix-Alexandre Bernier (DD)	Lucie Lecours †
Les Plaines	Fatou Diop	Agathe Owona	Irène Dubé	Dieudonné Ella Oyono	Habib Diarra		Maxime Émilie Savoie (ind.)	Lucie Lecours †
Mirabel	Marjolaine Ferron	Daniela Rodriguez	Marjolaine Goudreau	Geneviève Couture	Francis Brosseau	Danick Soucy	Zenzi Wolker (Canadian)	Sylvie D'Amours †
Prévost	Sonia Bélanger	Paul Landry	Alix Gravel	Anne Nguyen	Joyce Sauriol		Sabine Groulx (DD)	Sonia Bélanger
Saint-Jérôme	Carla Pierre-Paul	Suzanne Pomerleau	Orphée Dubé-Gervais	Sandrine Michon	Myriam Laroche	Sandra Hould		Youri Chassin †

== Montérégie (16) ==
=== East ===
Electoral district	Candidates							Incumbent
Electoral district	CAQ	Liberal	QS	PQ	PCQ	Climat	Other	Incumbent
Borduas	Simon Jolin-Barrette	Xavier Mercier	Audrey Mc Nicoll	Cédric Gagnon-Ducharme	Frederic Phaneuf	Thomas Thibault-Vincent		Simon Jolin-Barrette
Chambly	Jean-François Roberge	Sarah Belbey	Jessyca Sorel	Julie Guyot	Margarita Kantor	Frédéric Ouellet	Caroline Boisvert (ind.)	Jean-François Roberge
Chambly	Jean-François Roberge	Sarah Belbey	Jessyca Sorel	Julie Guyot	Margarita Kantor	Frédéric Ouellet	Marc-André Legault (DD)	Jean-François Roberge
Chambly	Jean-François Roberge	Sarah Belbey	Jessyca Sorel	Julie Guyot	Margarita Kantor	Frédéric Ouellet	François Pellerin (cul.)	Jean-François Roberge
Iberville	Audrey Bogemans	Vanessa Riendeau	Nicolas Chatel-Launay	Camille Pellerin-Forget	Mathieu Guérin		Caroline Blake (libert.)	Audrey Bogemans
Iberville	Audrey Bogemans	Vanessa Riendeau	Nicolas Chatel-Launay	Camille Pellerin-Forget	Mathieu Guérin		Marie-Hélène Roy Rioux (nul)	Audrey Bogemans
Marie-Victorin	Shirley Dorismond	Lyes Chekal	Lauréline Manassero	Nicolas Marceau	Amélie Legeay		Michel Fortin (Green)	Shirley Dorismond
Marie-Victorin	Shirley Dorismond	Lyes Chekal	Lauréline Manassero	Nicolas Marceau	Amélie Legeay		Gabriel Landry (PAPÉ)	Shirley Dorismond
Montarville	Nathalie Roy	Mathieu Lavoie	Ginette Langlois	Jean-François Cloutier	Marc Rondeau	Jean-Simon Bellavance	Sylvain Bouchard (ind.)	Nathalie Roy
Montarville	Nathalie Roy	Mathieu Lavoie	Ginette Langlois	Jean-François Cloutier	Marc Rondeau	Jean-Simon Bellavance	Annie St-Jacques (Présence)	Nathalie Roy
Richelieu	Jean-Bernard Émond	Gilles Delorme	Julien Bergeron	Jocelyn Desjardins	Christian Blouin	Martin Larivière	Jean-Louis Raymond (DD)	Jean-Bernard Émond
Saint-Hyacinthe	Jessika Gardner	Mariliz Turla-Vadnais	Philippe Daigneault	Simon-Pierre Savard-Tremblay	Alexandre Dion-Rolland		Julie Desmarais (cul.)	Chantal Soucy †
Saint-Jean	Yves Bisson	Patrice Léger-Bourgoin	Pierre-Luc Lavertu	Gaétan Bédard	Luc Sanfaçon	Denis Thériault	Martin Boudreau (nul)	Louis Lemieux †
Saint-Jean	Yves Bisson	Patrice Léger-Bourgoin	Pierre-Luc Lavertu	Gaétan Bédard	Luc Sanfaçon	Denis Thériault	Jean-Charles Cléroux (DD)	Louis Lemieux †
Saint-Jean	Yves Bisson	Patrice Léger-Bourgoin	Pierre-Luc Lavertu	Gaétan Bédard	Luc Sanfaçon	Denis Thériault	Julie Larouche (Présence)	Louis Lemieux †
Taillon	Stéphane Lavoie	Boubacar Camara	David Lalumière	Sandra Hernández	Samuel Bérubé		Samuel Pignedoli (nul)	Lionel Carmant †
Vachon	Ian Lafrenière	Affine Lwalalika	Magdouda Oudjit	Stephan Fogaing	Martine Boucher	Martine Lajoie		Ian Lafrenière
Verchères	Marie-Hélène Leboeuf	Yacine Masrouki	Léonie Thibault Rousseau	Guy Jr Lapointe	Julien Malo	Germain Dallaire		Suzanne Roy †

=== West ===
Electoral district	Candidates								Incumbent
Electoral district	CAQ	Liberal	QS	PQ	PCQ	Green	Canadian	Other	Incumbent
Beauharnois	Claude Reid	Charles Royer Tremblay	Virginie Helene Hockers	Alexandre Daneau	Angélika Homère	Charmaine Carvalho		Karine Pelletier (DD)	Claude Reid
Châteauguay	Marie-Belle Gendron	Félix Rhéaume	Marianne Pharand-Roy	Yannick Trudeau	Mohsen Eshtiaghi	José Bro	Hannah Wolker		Marie-Belle Gendron
Huntingdon	Stéphane Bisaillon	Connor Stacey	Valérie Dubois	Frédéric Laplante	Chantal Dauphinais		Dale Langille		Carole Mallette †
La Pinière	Clément Mireault	Linda Caron	Jacinthe Chapleau	Sarah Plante	Tzarevna Bratkova	Tina Jiuru Zhu	Emilia Farcutiu		Linda Caron
La Prairie	Pierre Guillot-Hurtubise	Sonia Ziadé	Francine Van Winden	Frédéric Côté	Marie Pelletier			Hélène Héroux (ML)	Christian Dubé †
La Prairie	Pierre Guillot-Hurtubise	Sonia Ziadé	Francine Van Winden	Frédéric Côté	Marie Pelletier			Barbara Joannette (Climat)	Christian Dubé †
Pierre-Laporte	Mélanie Martin	David Bowles	Claude Lefrançois	Anne-Sophie Maguire Armand	Mi Jie	Yahia Ghzala	Michael Douris	Stéphane Bilodeau (Climat)	Isabelle Poulet †
Pierre-Laporte	Mélanie Martin	David Bowles	Claude Lefrançois	Anne-Sophie Maguire Armand	Mi Jie	Yahia Ghzala	Michael Douris	Florent Portron (aut.)	Isabelle Poulet †
Sanguinet	Jean Lacroix	Pinou Thong	Virginie Bernier	Alain Therrien	Serge Benoit			Maxime Fournier (pot)	Christine Fréchette §
Soulanges	Marilyne Picard	Olivier Bertin-Mahieux	Florian Martin	Francis Deroo	Kristian Solarik		Joseph Cianflone	Jules Briand (DD)	Marilyne Picard
Vaudreuil	Chantal Darcy	James Hughes	Jeannette Uwantege	Meili Faille	Patrick Caron	Carole Thériault			Marie-Claude Nichols †

== Centre-du-Québec (17) ==
Electoral district	Candidates								Incumbent
Electoral district	CAQ	Liberal	QS	PQ	PCQ	Green	DD	Other	Incumbent
Arthabaska-L’Érable	Keven Brasseur	Thomas Guérette	Stéphanie Poirier	Alex Boissonneault	Tarek Henoud	Jonathan Croteau	Carol Filion		Alex Boissonneault
Drummond–Bois-Francs	Sébastien Schneeberger	Colin Hendry	Lila Houde	Charles Page	Myriam Cournoyer	Marco Beauchesne		Sylvain Audet (Présence)	Sébastien Schneeberger
Marie-Lacoste-Gérin-Lajoie	Patrick Saindon	Alexandra Houle	Sébastien Bage	Natalie Bisaillon	Laura Tremblay		Mario Roy	Mathieu Fillion (Climat)	new district
Marie-Lacoste-Gérin-Lajoie	Patrick Saindon	Alexandra Houle	Sébastien Bage	Natalie Bisaillon	Laura Tremblay		Mario Roy	Sylvain Marcoux (ind.)	new district
Nicolet-Bécancour	Donald Martel	Sophie Martinbeault	Milan Codebecq-Pérusse	Jérôme Gagnon	Guillaume Langlois			Marc-Olivier Billette (Climat)	Donald Martel
Nicolet-Bécancour	Donald Martel	Sophie Martinbeault	Milan Codebecq-Pérusse	Jérôme Gagnon	Guillaume Langlois			Christian Collard (ind.)	Donald Martel
Nicolet-Bécancour	Donald Martel	Sophie Martinbeault	Milan Codebecq-Pérusse	Jérôme Gagnon	Guillaume Langlois			Steve Lauzier (Présence)	Donald Martel
