= Québec solidaire candidates in the 2012 Quebec provincial election =

This is a list of candidates for Québec solidaire in the 2012 Quebec provincial election. QS ran candidates in 124 of the province's 125 ridings; 2 of whom were elected. Following the election, Québec solidaire was the fourth-largest party in the National Assembly of Quebec.

== Central Quebec ==
Riding	Candidate's Name	Notes	Residence	Occupation	Votes	%	Rank
Berthier	Louise Beaudry				2,015	4.83	4th
Bertrand	Lise Boivin				2,351	5.35	4th
Champlain	Yves Sansregret				1,541	4.15	4th
Joliette	Flavie Trudel	QS candidate for Joliette in the 2008 and 2007 provincial elections			2,449	5.63	4th
L'Assomption	Sylvain Fournier				1,465	3.60	4th
Laviolette	Jean-François Dubois				951	3.77	4th
Maskinongé	Julie Veilleux				1,334	3.66	4th
Masson	Jacinthe Sabourin				1,199	3.17	4th
Portneuf	Raphaël Langevin				932	3.01	4th
Repentigny	Olivier Huard	QS candidate for L'Assomption in the 2008 and 2007 provincial elections		Arborist	1,730	4.20	4th
Rousseau	François Lépine	QS candidate for Rousseau in the 2009 Rousseau provincial by-election and the 2008 general election			2,163	4.98	4th
Saint-Jérôme	Vincent Lemay-Thivierge				2,903	7.17	4th
Saint-Maurice	Luc Lafrance				1,50	4.74	4th
Trois-Rivières	Jean-Claude Landry				1,615	5.04	4th

== Eastern Townships/Southern Quebec ==
Riding	Candidate's Name	Notes	Residence	Occupation	Votes	%	Rank
Arthabaska	Christine Letendre				1,775	3.96	4th
Beauce-Nord	Yv Bonnier Viger			Epidemiologist	796	2.21	4th
Beauce-Sud	Marie-Claude Verville				861	2.47	4th
Beauharnois	Pierre-Paul St-Onge				1,328	3.97	4th
Borduas	Jean-François Lessard				2,715	5.81	4th
Brome-Missisquoi	Benoit Van Caloen				1,944	4.64	4th
Chambly	Anne Poussard				1,878	4.99	4th
Drummond–Bois-Francs	Francis Soulard				1,607	4.35	4th
Granby	Éric Bédard				2,121	5.67	4th
Huntingdon	Carmen Labelle				1,116	3.72	4th
Iberville	Myriam-Zaa Normandin				1,462	4.13	4th
Johnson	Julie Dionne				1,887	4.55	4th
Lotbinière-Frontenac	Marie-Christine Rochefot				1,783	4.37	4th
Mégantic	William Leclerc Bellavance				1,531	5.40	4th
Nicolet-Bécancour	None				–	–	–
Orford	Patricia Tremblay	QS candidate for Orford in the 2008, and 2007 provincial elections			1,687	5.39	4th
Richelieu	Marie-Ève Mathieu				1,084	3.22	4th
Richmond	Colombe Landry				1,858	4.13	4th
Saint-François	André Poulin				2,103	4.99	4th
Saint-Hyacinthe	Richard Gingras				2,198	4.96	4th
Saint-Jean	Carole Lusignan				1,886	4.20	4th
Sherbrooke	Christian Bibeau	QS candidate for Sherbrooke in the 2008 and 2007 provincial elections			2,586	6.85	4th
Verchères	Marie-Thérèse Toutant				1,900	4.07	4th

== Greater Montreal ==
Riding	Candidate's Name	Notes	Residence	Occupation	Votes	%	Rank
Acadie	Marianne Breton Fontaine				2,474	8.01	4th
Anjou–Louis-Riel	Marlène Lessard				2,347	7.27	4th
Blainville	Étienne Ferland				1,817	3.89	4th
Bourassa-Sauvé	Will Prosper		Montreal		3,045	10.28	4th
Bourget	Patrice Gagnon				3,381	9.43	4th
Châteauguay	Xavier P.-Laberge				1,220	3.32	4th
Chomedey	Francine Bellerose	QS candidate for Chomedey in the 2008 and 2007 provincial elections			1,362	3.56	4th
Crémazie	André Frappier				4,014	11.57	4th
D'Arcy-McGee	Suzanne Dufresne				987	3.75	3rd
Deux-Montagnes	Normand Godon				1,522	4.09	4th
Fabre	Wilfried Cordeau				1,260	3.55	4th
Gouin	Françoise David	President of the Fédération des femmes du Québec (1994–2001); QS candidate for Gouin in the 2008 and 2007 provincial elections	Montreal		15,483	46.03	1st
Groulx	Sylvie Giguère				1,892	4.30	4th
Hochelaga-Maisonneuve	Alexandre Leduc		Montreal	Union official (FTQ)	6,701	23.69	2nd
Jacques-Cartier	François-Xavier Charlebois				859	2.56	5th
Jeanne-Mance–Viger	Marie-Chantal Locas				1,618	5.06	4th
La Pinière	Johane Beaupré				1,832	4.39	4th
La Prairie	Yohan Perron				1,195	3.52	4th
LaFontaine	Christine Filiatrault				1,248	4.32	4th
Laporte	Michèle St-Denis	QS candidate for Laporte in the 2008 and 2007 provincial elections			2,043	5.92	4th
Laurier-Dorion	Andrés Fontecilla		Montreal		7,844	24.33	3rd
Laval-des-Rapides	Sylvie Des Rochers	QS candidate for Laval-des-Rapides in the 2008 provincial election			1,643	4.22	4th
Marguerite-Bourgeoys	Yebo Romaric Okou				1,434	4.08	4th
Marie-Victorin	Carl Lévesque		Coteau-Rouge, Longueuil	Postal worker	2,702	8.21	4th
Marquette	Claudelle Cyr				1,232	3.67	4th
Mercier	Amir Khadir	Member of the National Assembly for Mercier (2008–2018)	Montreal	Physician	14,164	46.73	1st
Mille-Îles	Nicole Bellerose	QS candidate for Mille-Îles in the 2008 and 2007 provincial elections			1,508	4.73	4th
Mirabel	Mylène Jaccoud	QS candidate for Bertrand in the 2008 provincial election QS candidate for Prévost in the 2007 provincial election		Professor at the Université de Montréal	1,687	3.79	4th
Mont-Royal	Marc-André Beauchamp				1,743	6.83	4th
Montarville	David Fortin Côté				2,010	4.47	4th
Nelligan	Elahé Machouf				966	2.33	5th
Notre-Dame-de-Grâce	David Mandel				2,191	8.56	3rd
Pointe-aux-Trembles	Natacha Larocque				1,811	5.91	4th
Robert-Baldwin	Sarah Landry	QS candidate for Robert-Baldwin in the 2008 provincial election			1,083	2.92	4th
Rosemont	François Saillant	QS candidate for Rosemont in the 2008 and 2007 provincial elections			5,564	14.48	4th
Saint-Henri–Sainte-Anne	Nicolas Boisclair				4,084	11.31	4th
Saint-Laurent	Marie Josèphe Pigeon	QS candidate for Saint-Laurent in the 2010 Saint-Laurent provincial by-election			1,718	5.02	4th
Sainte-Marie–Saint-Jacques	Manon Massé		Montreal		7,253	25.43	2nd
Sainte-Rose	Nicolas Chatel-Launay				1,689	4.36	4th
Sanguinet	Frédéric Nadeau				1,056	3.47	4th
Taillon	Manon Blanchard	QS candidate for Taillon in the 2008 and 2007 provincial elections; and the 2006 Taillon provincial by-election			2,874	7.25	4th
Terrebonne	Yan Smith				1,380	3.22	4th
Vachon	Sebastien Robert	QS candidate for Vachon in the 2010 Vachon provincial by-election			1,878	5.05	4th
Vaudreuil	Marc-André Pilon				2,099	4.88	4th
Verdun	Chantale Michaud	QS candidate for Verdun in the 2008 provincial election			2,449	7.28	4th
Viau	Geneviève Fortier-Moreau				2,873	11.52	4th
Vimont	David Lanneville				1,373	3.97	4th
Westmount–Saint-Louis	Mélissa Desjardins				1,493	6.41	4th

== Northern Quebec ==
Riding	Candidate's Name	Notes	Residence	Occupation	Votes	%	Rank
Abitibi-Est	Sarah Charbonneau-Beaulieu				1,047	4.77	4th
Abitibi-Ouest	Ghislaine Camirand				1,260	5.36	4th
Chicoutimi	Pierre Dostie				1,755	4.95	4th
Dubuc	Marie Francine Bienvenue	QS candidate for Dubuc in the 2008 and 2007 provincial elections UFP candidate for Dubuc in the 2003 provincial election			1,118	3.82	4th
Duplessis	Jacques Gélineau				1,032	4.41	4th
Jonquière	Réjean Dumais				1,089	3.20	4th
Lac-Saint-Jean	Frédérick Plamondon				1,214	3.80	4th
René-Lévesque	Julie Gonthier-Brazeau				892	3.90	4th
Roberval	Olivier Bouchard-Lamontagne				1,302	4.03	4th
Rouyn-Noranda–Témiscamingue	Guy Leclerc	QS candidate for Rouyn-Noranda–Témiscamingue in the 2008 provincial election			2,941	9.76	4th
Ungava	Sylvain Couture				655	6.14	4th

== Quebec City/Gaspé/Eastern Quebec ==
Riding	Candidate's Name	Notes	Residence	Occupation	Votes	%	Rank
Bellechasse	Benoit Comeau				989	3.07	4th
Bonaventure	Patricia Chartier				1,278	5.15	4th
Charlesbourg	Marie Céline Domingue				1,612	3.89	4th
Charlevoix–Côte-de-Beaupré	André Jacob				1,227	3.22	4th
Chauveau	Sébastien Bouchard				1,337	3.02	4th
Chutes-de-la-Chaudière	Eveline Gueppe				1,727	3.83	4th
Côte-du-Sud	Josée Michaud				1,221	3.38	4th
Gaspé	Eric Boucher				1,221	3.38	4th
Îles-de-la-Madeleine	Yvonne Langford				403	4.78	4th
Jean-Talon	Emilie Guimond-Bélanger				2,321	6.40	4th
Jean-Lesage	Élaine Hémond				2,598	7.98	4th
La Peltrie	Brigitte Hannequin				1,069	2.54	4th
Lévis	Valérie C. Guilloteau				1,904	5.23	4th
Louis-Hébert	Guillaume Boivin				1,359	3.58	4th
Matane-Matapédia	Diane Bélanger				1,230	3.67	4th
Montmorency	Lucie Charbonneau	QS candidate for Montmorency in the 2008 provincial election			1,460	3.44	4th
Rimouski	Rosalie Carrier-Cyr				2,409	7.29	4th
Rivière-du-Loup–Témiscouata	Stacy Larouche				1,116	2.98	4th
Taschereau	Serge Roy				4,416	11.69	4th
Vanier-Les Rivières	Monique Voisine				1,371	3.18	4th

== Western Quebec/Laurentides/Outaouais ==
Riding	Candidate's Name	Notes	Residence	Occupation	Votes	%	Rank
Argenteuil	Yvan Zanetti	QS candidate for Argenteuil in the 2012 Argenteuil provincial by-election			865	2.65	4th
Chapleau	Benoit Renaud	QS candidate for Chapleau in the 2008 provincial election			1,731	4.92	4th
Gatineau	Francis Da Silva-Casimiro				1,648	4.47	4th
Hull	Bill Clennett	QS candidate for Hull in the 2008 and 2007 provincial elections			2,651	7.94	4th
Labelle	Normand St-Amour				1,976	3.62	4th
Papineau	Katia Gagnon				1,963	5.25	4th
Pontiac	Charmain Levy	QS candidate for Pontiac in the 2008 provincial election			1 565	5.22	4th
Soulanges	Andrée Bessette				1,323	3.62	4th
