= Québec solidaire candidates in the 2018 Quebec provincial election =

This is a list of candidates for Québec solidaire in the 2018 Quebec provincial election. QS ran candidates in all of the province's 125 ridings; 10 of whom were elected. Following the election, Québec solidaire was the third-largest party in the National Assembly of Quebec.

== Central Quebec ==
Riding	Candidate's Name	Notes	Residence	Occupation	Votes	%	Rank
Berthier	Louise Beaudry			Retired	6,169	15.43	3rd
Bertrand	Mylène Jaccoud	QS candidate for Mirabel in the 2014 and 2012 provincial elections QS candidate for Bertrand in the 2008 provincial election QS candidate for Prévost in the 2007 provincial election		Professor at the Université de Montréal	6,047	18.12	3rd
Champlain	Steven Roy Cullen			Manager	5,285	12.96	3rd
Joliette	Judith Sicard				3,881	10.15	3rd
L'Assomption	Marie-Claude Brière				5,425	16.96	2nd
Laviolette–Saint-Maurice	Christine Cardin			Student	5,414	15.12	4th
Les Plaines	Kévin St-Jean				3,738	13.85	3rd
Maskinongé	Simon Piotte				3,764	12.10	4th
Masson	Stephane Durupt				4,451	13.44	3rd
Portneuf	Odile Pelletier			Teacher	3,364	11.42	3rd
Prévost	Lucie Mayer		Prévost		4,414	13.96	3rd
Repentigny	Olivier Huard	QS candidate for Repentigny in the 2014 and 2012 provincial elections and for L'Assomption in the 2008 and 2007 provincial elections		Arborist	5,622	14.87	3rd
Rousseau	Hélène Dubé			Financial professional	3,531	13.00	3rd
Saint-Jérôme	Ève Duhaime		Saint-Jérôme	Self-employed	6,243	15.85	3rd
Trois-Rivières	Valérie Delage			Social worker	6,411	17.18	3rd

== Eastern Townships/Southern Quebec ==
Riding	Candidate's Name	Notes	Residence	Occupation	Votes	%	Rank
Arthabaska	William Champigny-Fortier		Victoriaville		5,215	12.58	2nd
Beauce-Nord	Fernand Dorval	UFP candidate for Montmagny-L'Islet in the 2003 provincial election			2,131	7.06	3rd
Beauce-Sud	Diane Vincent			Pharmacy technician	1,934	5.79	3rd
Beauharnois	Pierre-Paul St-Onge	QS candidate for Beauharnois in the 2014 and 2012 provincial elections			4,816	15.05	3rd
Borduas	Annie Desharnais			Speech therapist	6,828	15.65	3rd
Brome-Missisquoi	Alexandre Legault				7,167	17.28	3rd
Chambly	Francis Vigeant	QS candidate for Chambly in the 2014 provincial election			6,177	16.39	3rd
Drummond–Bois-Francs	Lannïck Dinard		Chesterville	Cabinetmaker	5,221	15.01	2nd
Granby	Anne-Sophie Legault				5,075	14.03	2nd
Huntingdon	Aiden Hodgins-Ravensbergen		Hemmingford	University student	3,676	12.72	3rd
Iberville	Philippe Jetten-Vigeant			Agronomist	5,779	17.32	3rd
Johnson	Sarah Saint-Cyr Lanoie				7,051	17.87	2nd
Lotbinière-Frontenac	Normand Beaudet	NDP candidate for Rivière-des-Mille-Îles in the 2008 federal election and for Terrebonne—Blainville in the 2004 and 2000 federal elections	Leclercville		3,593	9.49	3rd
Mégantic	Andrée Larrivée			Women's shelter manager	4,228	15.96	3rd
Nicolet-Bécancour	François Poisson		Bécancour	Actor	3,474	12.34	4th
Orford	Annabelle Lalumière-Ting			Educator	5,406	17.87	3rd
Richelieu	Sophie Pagé Sabourin		Sorel-Tracy	Student	4,101	13.38	3rd
Richmond	Colombe Landry	QS candidate for Richmond in the 2014 and 2012 provincial elections and for Johnson in the 2008 provincial election	Saint-Denis-de-Brompton	Social worker	8,110	18.90	3rd
Saint-François	Kévin Côté			Teacher	8,833	22.68	3rd
Saint-Hyacinthe	Marijo Demers				6,826	16.72	2nd
Saint-Jean	Simon Lalonde			Librarian	6,137	14.44	3rd
Sherbrooke	Christine Labrie		Sherbrooke		12,315	34.27	1st
Verchères	Jean-René Péloquin		Saint-Amable		6,723	14.76	3rd

== Greater Montreal ==
Riding	Candidate's Name	Notes	Residence	Occupation	Votes	%	Rank
Acadie	Viviane Martinova-Croteau	Option nationale candidate for Robert-Baldwin in the 2014 provincial election			3,656	13.75	3rd
Anjou–Louis-Riel	Marie-Josée Forget				4,018	14.53	4th
Blainville	William Lepage				6,408	15.12	3rd
Bourassa-Sauvé	Alejandra Zaga Mendez			Researcher	3,469	13.98	3rd
Camille-Laurin	Marlène Lessard	QS candidate for Anjou–Louis-Riel in the 2014 and 2012 provincial elections			7,865	24.44	3rd
Châteauguay	Sandrine Garcia-McDiarmid			Nurse	4,236	12.81	3rd
Chomedey	Rabah Moulla			Professor	2,144	7.07	4th
D'Arcy-McGee	Jean-Claude Kumuyange			Researcher	1,861	7.25	2nd
Deux-Montagnes	Audrey Lesage-Lanthier				4,912	14.53	3rd
Fabre	Nora Yata			Teacher	3,487	10.77	3rd
Gouin	Gabriel Nadeau-Dubois	Co-spokesperson of Québec solidaire (2017–present); Member of the National Assembly for Gouin (2017–present)	Montreal		17,977	59.14	1st
Groulx	Fabien Torres			Professor at Collège Lionel-Groulx	6,268	17.23	3rd
Hochelaga-Maisonneuve	Alexandre Leduc		Montreal	Union official (FTQ)	13,389	50.05	1st
Jacques-Cartier	Nicolas Chatel-Launay		Sainte-Anne-de-Bellevue	Entomologist	1,291	4.39	4th
Jeanne-Mance–Viger	Ismaël Seck				2,237	8.15	3rd
La Pinière	Marie Pagès			Union official (CSN)	3,300	10.04	3rd
La Prairie	Daniel Blouin			Professor at Cégep Marie-Victorin	4,362	12.97	4th
LaFontaine	David Touchette			Project manager	2,181	8.85	3rd
Laporte	Claude Lefrançois		Saint-Lambert, Longueuil	Veterinarian	6,007	17.10	3rd
Laurier-Dorion	Andrés Fontecilla	Co-spokesperson of Québec solidaire (2013–2017)	Montreal		14,226	47.28	1st
Laval-des-Rapides	Graciela Mateo				5,721	16.96	3rd
Marguerite-Bourgeoys	Camille St-Laurent				3,095	10.76	3rd
Marie-Victorin	Carl Lévesque	QS candidate for Marie-Victorin in the 2016 Marie-Victorin byelection and 2014 and 2012 provincial elections	Coteau-Rouge, Longueuil	Postal worker	6,295	21.67	3rd
Marquette	Anick Perreault		Lachine, Montreal	Student (Université du Québec à Montréal)	3,153	11.47	3rd
Maurice-Richard	Raphaël Rebelo				8,929	27.86	2nd
Mercier	Ruba Ghazal			Accountant	15,919	54.50	1st
Mille-Îles	Jean Trudelle	QS candidate for Rosemont in the 2014 provincial election	Laval	Professor at Collège Ahuntsic	3,711	12.77	4th
Mirabel	Marjolaine Goudreau		Mirabel	Social worker	5,916	14.96	3rd
Mont-Royal–Outremont	Eve Torres				4,820	15.44	2nd
Montarville	Caroline Charette				6,716	15.90	4th
Nelligan	Simon Tremblay-Pepin			Economist	1,902	5.52	3rd
Notre-Dame-de-Grâce	Kathleen Gudmundsson				3,166	11.84	2nd
Pointe-aux-Trembles	Céline Pereira				4,046	14.86	3rd
Robert-Baldwin	Zachary Williams		West Island		1,317	4.34	3rd
Rosemont	Vincent Marissal		Montreal	Journalist	12,920	35.25	1st
Saint-Henri–Sainte-Anne	Benoit Racette				7,413	23.83	2nd
Saint-Laurent	Marie Josèphe Pigeon		Rosemont–La Petite-Patrie, Montreal	Women's shelter manager	2,458	8.62	3rd
Sainte-Marie–Saint-Jacques	Manon Massé	Member of the National Assembly for Sainte-Marie–Saint-Jacques (2014–present); Co-spokesperson of Québec solidaire (2017–2023)	Montreal		12,429	49.28	1st
Sainte-Rose	Simon Charron			Student	5,082	13.88	4th
Sanguinet	Maya Fréchette-Bonnier		Saint-Constant	Teacher	4,390	14.72	3rd
Taillon	Manon Blanchard		Longueuil	Public housing director	6,382	17.68	3rd
Terrebonne	Anne B-Godbout			Marketing professional	5,279	12.86	3rd
Vachon	André Vincent		Saint-Hubert, Longueuil	Librarian	5,194	14.50	4th
Vaudreuil	Igor Erchov			Mortgage broker	3,811	10.05	4th
Verdun	Vanessa Roy		Verdun, Montreal	Physiotherapist	7,457	23.95	2nd
Viau	Sylvain Lafrenière				5,276	24.33	2nd
Vimont	Caroline Trottier-Gascon			Student (Concordia University)	3,602	11.52	4th
Westmount–Saint-Louis	Ekaterina Piskunova			Professor at the Université de Montréal	2,236	10.25	2nd

== Northern Quebec ==
Riding	Candidate's Name	Notes	Residence	Occupation	Votes	%	Rank
Abitibi-Est	Lyne Cyr		Senneterre	Childcare worker	3,287	15.66	4th
Abitibi-Ouest	Rose Marquis		La Sarre	Educator	3,735	16.59	3rd
Chicoutimi	Pierre Dostie	QS candidate for Chicoutimi in the 2016 Chicoutimi byelection		Professor at the Université du Québec à Chicoutimi	3,977	12.88	4th
Dubuc	Marie Francine Bienvenue	QS candidate for Dubuc in the 2012, 2008, and 2007 provincial elections UFP candidate for Dubuc in the 2003 provincial election			3,163	12.08	4th
Duplessis	Martine Roux			Social worker	2,534	12.38	4th
Jonquière	Marcel Lapointe	Équipe Paul Grimard candidate for District 6 in the 2013 Jonquière municipal election			2,242	7.28	4th
Lac-Saint-Jean	Manon Girard			Café manager	4,305	14.85	3rd
René-Lévesque	Sandrine Bourque		Montreal	Media professional	1,948	10.21	4th
Roberval	Luc-Antoine Cauchon	Option nationale candidate for Roberval in the 2014 provincial election		Chef	2,975	10.70	4th
Rouyn-Noranda–Témiscamingue	Émilise Lessard-Therrien	Member of Duhamel-Ouest Town Council (2017–2018)	Duhamel-Ouest	Farmer	9,304	32.08	1st
Ungava	Alisha Tukkiapik		Kuujjuaraapik	Social worker	1,416	16.53	4th

== Quebec City/Gaspé/Eastern Quebec ==
Riding	Candidate's Name	Notes	Residence	Occupation	Votes	%	Rank
Bellechasse	Benoit Comeau	QS candidate for Bellechasse in the 2014 and 2012 provincial elections			2,272	7.50	3rd
Bonaventure	Catherine Cyr Wright		New Richmond	Teacher	3,282	15.00	4th
Charlesbourg	Élisabeth Germain		Saint-Sauveur	Researcher	5,613	13.52	3rd
Charlevoix–Côte-de-Beaupré	Jessica Crossan			Professor	4,472	12.87	4th
Chauveau	Francis Lajoie				4,052	10.35	3rd
Chutes-de-la-Chaudière	Olivier Bolduc	QS candidate for Chutes-de-la-Chaudière in the 2014 provincial election			4,950	11.43	3rd
Côte-du-Sud	Guillaume Dufour		Kamouraska	Professor at Cégep de La Pocatière	3,560	10.85	3rd
Gaspé	Alexis Dumont-Blanchet		Cap-Chat	Social worker	2,482	13.81	4th
Îles-de-la-Madeleine	Robert Boudreau-Welsh				1,036	13.55	3rd
Jean-Talon	Patrick Provost		Quebec City	Professor at the Université Laval	6,515	19.18	3rd
Jean-Lesage	Sol Zanetti	Leader of Option nationale (2013–2018)	Quebec City	Professor	10,331	34.70	1st
La Peltrie	Alexandre Jobin-Lawler	QS candidate for La Peltrie in the 2014 provincial election		Researcher	4,000	9.87	3rd
Lévis	Georges Goma				3,979	11.74	3rd
Louis-Hébert	Guillaume Boivin	QS candidate for Louis-Hébert in the 2017 Louis-Hébert byelection and the 2012 provincial election and for La Peltrie in the 2008 and 2007 provincial elections	Quebec City	Lawyer	1,235	5.21	4th
Matane-Matapédia	Marie-Phare Boucher				1,718	5.78	4th
Montmorency	Marie-Christine Lamontagne			Student	5,225	13.14	3rd
Rimouski	Carol-Ann Kack		Rimouski	Educator	5,531	17.43	3rd
Taschereau	Catherine Dorion		Limoilou, Quebec City	Writer	15,373	42.52	1st
Rivière-du-Loup–Témiscouata	Goulimine Sylvie Cadôret		Lejeune	Project manager	3,783	11.03	4th
Vanier-Les Rivières	Monique Voisine	QS candidate for Vanier-Les Rivières in the 2014 and 2012 provincial elections and for Vanier in the 2008 provincial election			4,946	12.21	3rd

== Western Quebec/Laurentides/Outaouais ==
Riding	Candidate's Name	Notes	Residence	Occupation	Votes	%	Rank
Argenteuil	Céline Lachapelle			Manager	3,710	12.17	4th
Chapleau	Alexandre Albert		Gatineau		5,122	15.86	3rd
Hull	Benoit Renaud	QS candidate for Hull in the 2014 provincial election			5,764	18.50	3rd
Labelle	Gabriel Dagenais	QS candidate for Labelle in the 2014 provincial election			4,954	15.34	3rd
Papineau	Mélanie Pilon-Gauvin			Student (École nationale d'administration publique)	5,434	15.02	3rd
Pontiac	Julia Wilkie		Aylmer, Gatineau	Student	2,964	10.74	3rd
Soulanges	Maxime Larue-Bourdages	QS candidate for Beauharnois in the 2008 provincial election		Union official (CSN)	4,508	11.55	3rd
