= Québec solidaire candidates in the 2014 Quebec provincial election =

This is a list of candidates for Québec solidaire in the 2014 Quebec provincial election. QS ran candidates in 124 of the province's 125 ridings; 3 of whom were elected. Following the election, Québec solidaire was the fourth-largest party in the National Assembly of Quebec.

== Central Quebec ==
Riding	Candidate's Name	Notes	Residence	Occupation	Votes	%	Rank
Berthier	Louise Beaudry				2,666	7.01	4th
Bertrand	Lucie Mayer		Prévost	Opera singer	3,070	7.53	4th
Champlain	Lucie Favreau				1,848	5.32	4th
Joliette	Flavie Trudel				2,866	7.27	4th
L'Assomption	Sylvain Fournier	QS candidate for L'Assomption in the 2012 provincial election			2,198	5.80	4th
Laviolette	Jean-François Dubois	QS candidate for Laviolette in the 2012 provincial election			1,104	4.67	4th
Maskinongé	Linda Delmé	Parti de la classe moyenne candidate for Maskinongé in the 2012 provincial election		Manager	2,013	5.78	4th
Masson	Joëlle St-Pierre				2,168	6.28	4th
Portneuf	Catherine Côté				1,209	3.92	4th
Repentigny	Olivier Huard	QS candidate for Repentigny in the 2012 provincial election and for L'Assomption in the 2008 and 2007 provincial elections		Arborist	2,490	6.47	4th
Rousseau	François Lépine	QS candidate for Rousseau in the 2012 provincial election, 2009 Rousseau byelection, and the 2008 provincial election Parti pour la république du Canada candidate for Bourassa in the 1989 provincial election		Teacher	2,548	6.38	4th
Saint-Jérôme	Vincent Lemay-Thivierge	QS candidate for Saint-Jérôme in the 2012 provincial election		Artist	3,991	10.76	4th
Saint-Maurice	Marie-Line Audet				1,304	5.31	4th
Trois-Rivières	Jean-Claude Landry	QS candidate for Trois-Rivières in the 2012 provincial election		Social worker	2,531	8.50	4th

== Eastern Townships/Southern Quebec ==
Riding	Candidate's Name	Notes	Residence	Occupation	Votes	%	Rank
Arthabaska	Christine Letendre	QS candidate for Arthabaska in the 2012 provincial election			2,222	5.21	4th
Beauce-Nord	Mathieu Dumont		Saint-Lambert-de-Lauzon		887	2.86	4th
Beauce-Sud	Diane Vincent			Pharmacy technician	729	2.16	4th
Beauharnois	Pierre-Paul St-Onge	QS candidate for Beauharnois in the 2012 provincial election		Researcher	2,106	6.88	4th
Borduas	Jean Falardeau				3,678	8.60	4th
Brome-Missisquoi	Benoit Van Caloen	QS candidate for Brome-Missisquoi in the 2012 provincial election	Brome Lake	Professor at the Université de Sherbrooke	2,751	6.76	4th
Chambly	Francis Vigeant		Richelieu		2,618	7.39	4th
Drummond–Bois-Francs	Francis Soulard	QS candidate for Drummond–Bois-Francs in the 2012 provincial election		Community worker	2,116	6.21	4th
Granby	André Beauregard	Member of Saint-Hyacinthe City Council (2009–2021)	Saint-Hyacinthe		1,565	4.50	4th
Huntingdon	Carmen Labelle	QS candidate for Huntingdon in the 2012 provincial election			1,490	5.13	4th
Iberville	Myriam-Zaa Normandin	QS candidate for Iberville in the 2012 provincial election			2,283	7.02	4th
Johnson	François Desrochers			Student (Université du Québec à Montréal)	2,365	6.26	4th
Lotbinière-Frontenac	Nadia Blouin				1,403	3.56	4th
Mégantic	Ludovick Nadeau	QS candidate for Mégantic-Compton in the 2007 provincial election			1,541	5.80	4th
Nicolet-Bécancour	Marc Dion				2,290	7.92	4th
Orford	Patricia Tremblay	QS candidate for Orford in the 2012, 2008, and 2007 provincial elections			2,291	7.74	4th
Richelieu	Marie-Ève Mathieu	QS candidate for Richelieu in the 2012 provincial election		Teacher	1,589	5.30	4th
Richmond	Colombe Landry	QS candidate for Richmond in the 2012 provincial election and for Johnson in the 2008 provincial election	Saint-Denis-de-Brompton	Social worker	2,833	6.79	4th
Saint-François	André Poulin	QS candidate for Saint-François in the 2012 provincial election		Professor	3,136	8.11	4th
Saint-Hyacinthe	Danielle Pelland			Childcare worker	2,806	6.94	4th
Saint-Jean	Carole Lusignan	QS candidate for Saint-Jean in the 2012 provincial election			2,693	6.48	4th
Sherbrooke	Hélène Pigot		Sherbrooke	Professor at the Université de Sherbrooke	4,393	12.93	4th
Verchères	Céline Jarrousse				3,074	7.09	4th

== Greater Montreal ==
Riding	Candidate's Name	Notes	Residence	Occupation	Votes	%	Rank
Acadie	Geneviève Dick			Student (Université du Québec à Montréal)	2,241	6.57	4th
Anjou–Louis-Riel	Marlène Lessard	QS candidate for Anjou–Louis-Riel in the 2012 provincial election		Community worker	2,448	7.75	4th
Blainville	Annie Giguère		Blainville	Administrator	2,898	6.52	4th
Bourassa-Sauvé	Claude Généreux			Union official (CUPE)	1,747	5.90	4th
Bourget	Gaétan Chateauneuf				3,714	11.20	4th
Châteauguay	Xavier P.-Laberge	QS candidate for Châteauguay in the 2012 provincial election		Student (Université de Sherbrooke)	2,059	5.72	4th
Chomedey	Lise-Anne Rhéaume				1,164	2.78	4th
Crémazie	André Frappier	Interim co-spokesperson of Québec solidaire (2012–2013)		Postal worker	4,726	13.71	4th
D'Arcy-McGee	Suzanne Dufresne				604	2.06	3rd
Deux-Montagnes	Duncan Hart Cameron		Saint-Eustache	Professor at Cégep de Saint-Jérôme	2,326	6.69	4th
Fabre	Marie-Claire Des Rochers-Lamarche				2,122	5.68	4th
Gouin	Françoise David	Member of the National Assembly for Gouin (2012–2017); President of the Fédération des femmes du Québec (1994–2001)	Montreal		16,155	50.98	1st
Groulx	Sylvie Giguère	QS candidate for Groulx in the 2012 provincial election	Sainte-Thérèse		2,810	6.79	4th
Hochelaga-Maisonneuve	Alexandre Leduc	QS candidate for Hochelaga-Maisonneuve in the 2012 provincial election	Montreal	Union official (FTQ)	7,926	30.57	2nd
Jacques-Cartier	Jean-François Belley				855	2.37	5th
Jeanne-Mance–Viger	Stéphanie Charpentier			Student (Université de Montréal)	1,154	3.36	4th
La Pinière	Johane Beaupré	QS candidate for La Pinière in the 2012 provincial election			1,728	3.88	4th
La Prairie	Marilou André				1,938	5.92	4th
LaFontaine	Véronique Martineau				1,189	3.88	4th
Laporte	Michèle St-Denis	QS candidate for Laporte in the 2012, 2008, and 2007 provincial elections			2,530	7.63	4th
Laurier-Dorion	Andrés Fontecilla		Montreal	Community worker	9,330	27.69	2nd
Laval-des-Rapides	Nicolas Chatel-Launay				2,151	5.63	4th
Marguerite-Bourgeoys	Alexandre Emond				1,508	4.03	4th
Marie-Victorin	Carl Lévesque	QS candidate for Marie-Victorin in the 2012 provincial election	Coteau-Rouge, Longueuil	Postal worker	3,518	11.56	4th
Marquette	Marie-France Raymond-Dufour				1,915	5.88	4th
Mercier	Amir Khadir	Member of the National Assembly for Mercier (2008–2018)	Montreal	Physician	13,228	46.19	1st
Mille-Îles	Anik Paradis				1,545	4.73	4th
Mirabel	Mylène Jaccoud	QS candidate for Mirabel in the 2012 provincial election QS candidate for Bertrand in the 2008 provincial election QS candidate for Prévost in the 2007 provincial election		Professor at the Université de Montréal	2,543	6.10	4th
Mont-Royal	Roy Semak				1,440	4.95	4th
Montarville	Jean Marc Ostiguy				2,845	6.65	4th
Nelligan	None				–	–	–
Notre-Dame-de-Grâce	Annick Desjardins		Notre-Dame-de-Grâce, Montreal	Lawyer / Professor at the Université de Montréal	2,164	7.42	2nd
Pointe-aux-Trembles	Natacha Larocque	QS candidate for Pointe-aux-Trembles in the 2012 provincial election			2,165	7.78	4th
Robert-Baldwin	Ali Faour			Businessman	794	1.88	4th
Rosemont	Jean Trudelle	President of the Fédération nationale des enseignantes et enseignants du Québec (2009–2012)			6,930	18.68	3rd
Saint-Henri–Sainte-Anne	Molly Alexander			Lawyer	4,029	10.69	4th
Saint-Laurent	Hasnaa Kadiri			Lecturer at the Université de Montréal	2,100	5.49	3rd
Sainte-Marie–Saint-Jacques	Manon Massé	QS candidate for Sainte-Marie–Saint-Jacques in the 2012, 2008, and 2007 provincial elections and the 2006 Sainte-Marie–Saint-Jacques byelection	Montreal		8,437	30.60	1st
Sainte-Rose	André da Silva Pereira				2,262	5.78	4th
Sanguinet	Christian Laramée				1,650	3.47	4th
Taillon	Manon Blanchard	QS candidate for Taillon in the 2012, 2008, and 2007 provincial elections; and the 2006 Taillon provincial by-election	Longueuil	Public housing director	3,994	11.11	4th
Terrebonne	Yan Smith	QS candidate for Terrebonne in the 2012 provincial election			2,543	6.37	4th
Vachon	Sebastien Robert	QS candidate for Vachon in the 2012 provincial election and the 2010 Vachon provincial by-election	Saint-Hubert, Longueuil	Union official	2,644	7.29	4th
Vaudreuil	David Fortin Côté	QS candidate for Montarville in the 2012 provincial election			2,101	4.63	4th
Verdun	Rosa Pires		Montreal		3,277	9.65	4th
Viau	Geneviève Fortier-Moreau	QS candidate for Viau in the 2013 Viau provincial by-election and the 2012 provincial election		Teacher	2,795	10.87	3rd
Vimont	Janina Moran				1,676	4.81	4th
Westmount–Saint-Louis	Mélissa Desjardins	QS candidate for Westmount–Saint-Louis in the 2012 provincial election			1,523	6.24	3rd

== Northern Quebec ==
Riding	Candidate's Name	Notes	Residence	Occupation	Votes	%	Rank
Abitibi-Est	Valérie Dufour				1,469	7.12	4th
Abitibi-Ouest	Ghislaine Camirand	QS candidate for Abitibi-Ouest in the 2012 provincial election			1,354	6.17	4th
Chicoutimi	Réjean Godin			Geologist	2,105	6.46	5th
Dubuc	Marie-Lise Chrétien-Pineault			Project manager	1,494	5.38	4th
Duplessis	Jacques Gélineau	QS candidate for Duplessis in the 2012 provincial election			1,502	6.74	4th
Jonquière	Réjean Dumais	QS candidate for Jonquière in the 2012 provincial election		Engineer	1,608	5.19	4th
Lac-Saint-Jean	Frédérick Plamondon	QS candidate for Lac-Saint-Jean in the 2012 provincial election			1,872	6.34	4th
René-Lévesque	Marie-Pierre Clavette				1,297	6.47	4th
Roberval	Guillaume Néron				1,018	3.15	4th
Rouyn-Noranda–Témiscamingue	Guy Leclerc	QS candidate for Rouyn-Noranda–Témiscamingue in the 2012 and 2008 provincial elections		Architect	3,239	11.56	4th
Ungava	André Richer		Montreal	Dentist	512	4.70	4th

== Quebec City/Gaspé/Eastern Quebec ==
Riding	Candidate's Name	Notes	Residence	Occupation	Votes	%	Rank
Bellechasse	Benoit Comeau	QS candidate for Bellechasse in the 2012 provincial election			865	2.69	4th
Bonaventure	Patricia Chartier	Member of Maria Town Council (2013–2017)	Maria		1,540	6.18	3rd
Charlesbourg	Marie Céline Domingue	QS candidate for Charlesbourg in the 2012 provincial election			1,936	4.81	4th
Charlevoix–Côte-de-Beaupré	Jean-Yves Bernard				1,539	4.15	4th
Chauveau	Jean-Claude Bernheim			Criminologist	1,617	3.96	4th
Chutes-de-la-Chaudière	Olivier Bolduc				1,973	4.42	4th
Côte-du-Sud	Simon Côté				1,910	5.49	4th
Gaspé	Daniel Leboeuf		Percé	Pharmacist	989	5.13	4th
Îles-de-la-Madeleine	Natalia Porowska				499	6.04	3rd
Jean-Talon	Eveline Gueppe				3,626	9.05	4th
Jean-Lesage	Sébastien Bouchard	QS candidate for Chauveau in the 2012 provincial election			3,151	11.60	4th
La Peltrie	Alexandre Jobin-Lawler			Researcher	1,444	3.40	4th
Lévis	Yv Bonnier Viger			Epidemiologist	2,147	6.15	4th
Louis-Hébert	Pascal Minville				1,840	4.94	4th
Matane-Matapédia	Gérald Tremblay				1,511	5.13	4th
Montmorency	Jean-Pierre Duchesneau				1,981	4.68	4th
Rimouski	Marie-Neige Besner				4,851	16.37	3rd
Rivière-du-Loup–Témiscouata	Louis Gagnon			Professor at Cégep de Rivière-du-Loup	2,129	6.09	4th
Taschereau	Marie-Ève Duchesne			Social worker	5,495	15.29	4th
Vanier-Les Rivières	Monique Voisine	QS candidate for Vanier-Les Rivières in the 2012 provincial election			1,920	4.55	4th

== Western Quebec/Laurentides/Outaouais ==
Riding	Candidate's Name	Notes	Residence	Occupation	Votes	%	Rank
Argenteuil	Clotilde Bertrand				1,395	4.57	4th
Chapleau	Laura Avalos			Union official (PSAC)	1,996	5.86	4th
Gatineau	Alexis Harvey				2,255	6.08	4th
Hull	Benoit Renaud				3,647	11.05	3rd
Labelle	Gabriel Dagenais				2,457	8.04	4th
Papineau	Marc Sarazin				2,432	6.68	4th
Pontiac	Charmain Levy	QS candidate for Pontiac in the 2012 and 2008 provincial elections		Professor at the Université du Québec en Outaouais	2,157	6.37	4th
Soulanges	Andrée Bessette	QS candidate for Soulanges in the 2012 provincial election			3,425	9.84	3rd
