= Andrés Fontecilla =

Canadian politician (born 1967)

Andrés Fontecilla MNA
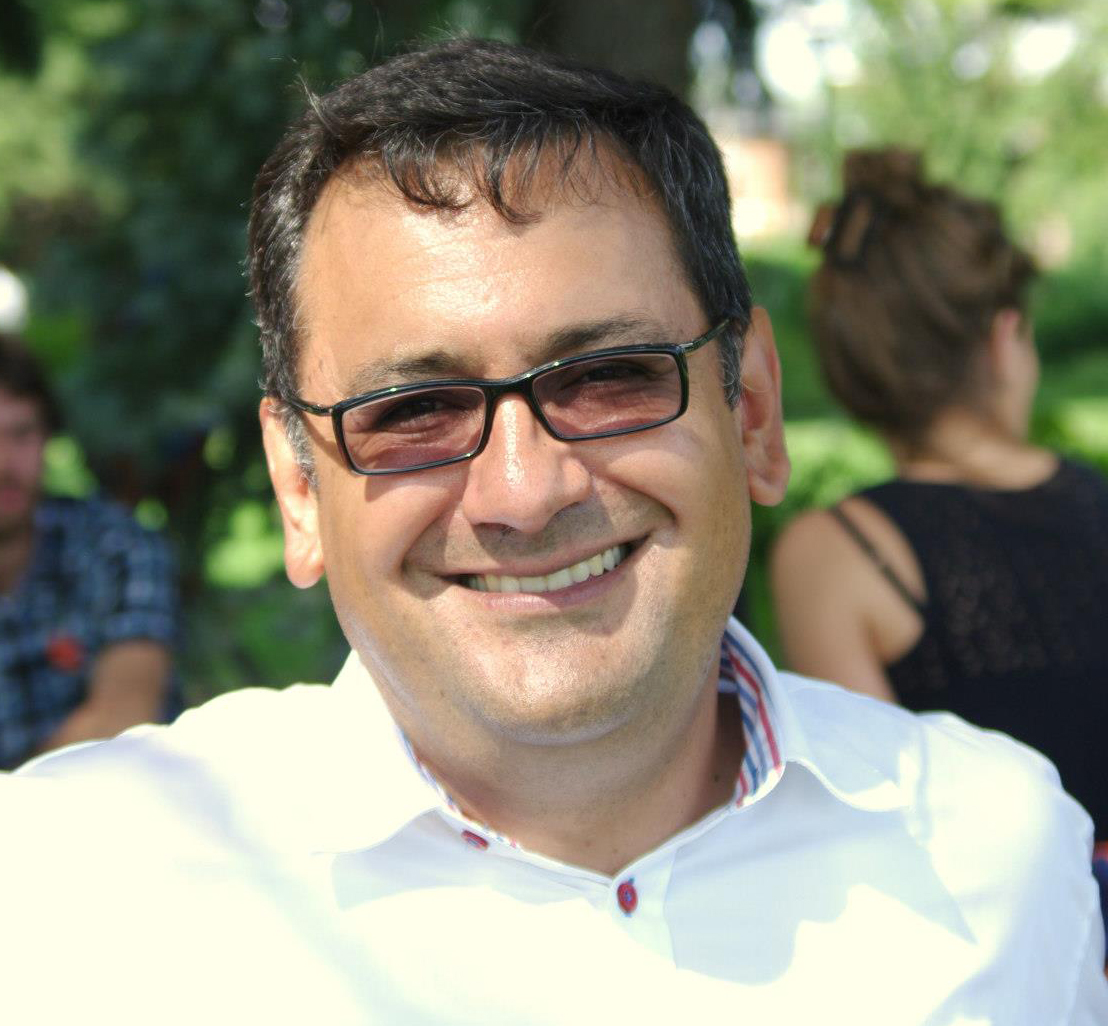

Spokesperson for Québec solidaire
- In office May 5, 2013 – May 21, 2017
- Preceded by: Amir Khadir
- Succeeded by: Gabriel Nadeau-Dubois

Member of the National Assembly for Laurier-Dorion
- Incumbent
- Assumed office October 1, 2018
- Preceded by: Gerry Sklavounos

Personal details
- Born: September 20, 1967 (age 59) Santiago, Chile
- Party: Québec solidaire
- Profession: Anthropologist, community worker

Andrés Fontecilla (born 20 September 1967) is a Canadian politician from Quebec. He was elected to the National Assembly of Quebec in the 2018 provincial election, representing the electoral district of Laurier-Dorion as a member of Québec solidaire.

He was co-spokesperson of the party, along with Françoise David, from 2013 to 2017.

Following his election in the 2022 provincial election, he was chosen to lead the issues of Housing and Dwelling, Immigration, Francisation and Integration, Fight against Racism, and Public Safety.

== Biography ==
Fontecilla was born in Chile but emigrated to Canada in 1981, having fled the authoritarian regime of Augusto Pinochet.

He completed a degree in anthropology at the University of Montreal, and was elected president of the student association for his department.

== Political career ==
Fontecilla was a member of the Quebec provincial party Union des forces progressistes (UFP) since its foundation and ran as the party's candidate in a 2004 by-election for the National Assembly of Quebec, but finished a distant third. In 2006 the UFP and Option citoyenne merged to form Québec solidaire. Fontecilla ran for Québec solidaire in the 2012 Quebec general election, finishing in third place. On 5 May 2013 he was chosen to be co-spokesperson of the party along with Françoise David.

He was again defeated in the 2014 Quebec general election, but won in 2018.

== Electoral record ==
2022 Quebec general election: Laurier-Dorion
Party	Candidate	Votes	%	±%
Québec solidaire	Andrés Fontecilla	13,323	48.80	+1.52
Liberal	Deepak Awasti	5,344	19.57	-10.09
Coalition Avenir Québec	Vicki Marcoux	3,203	11.73	+2.88
Parti Québécois	Maxime Larochelle	2,800	10.26	+2.47
Conservative	Guy Diotte	1,512	5.54	+4.36
Bloc Montreal	Amir Khan	480	1.76	–
Green	Ismaila Marega	332	1.22	-0.54
Parti culinaire	Amélie Villeneuve	157	0.58	+0.02
Parti nul	Mathieu Marcil	77	0.28	-0.18
Climat Québec	Anthony Van Duyse	75	0.27	–
Total valid votes		27,303	98.59	–
Total rejected ballots		391	1.41	–
Turnout		27,694	61.62	
Electors on the lists		44,943		

2018 Quebec general election: Laurier-Dorion
Party	Candidate	Votes	%	±%
Québec solidaire	Andrés Fontecilla	14,226	47.28	+19.59
Liberal	George Tsantrizos	8,925	29.66	-16.53
Coalition Avenir Québec	Simon Langelier	2,664	8.85	+1.64
Parti Québécois	Marie-Aline Vadius	2,344	7.79	-8.14
New Democratic	Apostolia Petropoulos	574	1.91	
Green	Juan Vazquez	530	1.76	+0.33
Conservative	Mohammad Yousuf	354	1.18	
Parti culinaire	Chef Jean Louis Thémis	169	0.56	
Parti nul	Mathieu Marcil	137	0.46	
Bloc Pot	Hugô St-Onge	73	0.24	-0.18
Citoyens au pouvoir	Eric Lessard	60	0.2	
Marxist–Leninist	Arezki Malek	35	0.12	-0.22
Total valid votes		30,091	98.77	
Total rejected ballots		375	1.23	
Turnout		30,466	63.59	
Eligible voters		47,910		
Québec solidaire gain from Liberal		Swing		+18.06
Source(s) "Rapport des résultats officiels du scrutin". Élections Québec.

2014 Quebec general election: Laurier-Dorion
Party	Candidate	Votes	%	±%
Liberal	Gerry Sklavounos	15,566	46.19	+12.11
Québec solidaire	Andrés Fontecilla	9,330	27.69	+3.36
Parti Québécois	Pierre Céré	5,369	15.93	-10.51
Coalition Avenir Québec	Valérie Assouline	2,431	7.21	-2.57
Green	Jeremy Tessier	482	1.43	-0.06
Option nationale	Miguel Tremblay	263	0.78	-2.05
Bloc Pot	Hugô St-Onge	143	0.42	–
Marxist–Leninist	Peter Macrisopoulos	116	0.34	+0.03
Total valid votes		33,700	98.74	–
Total rejected ballots		429	1.26	–
Turnout		34,129	72.60	+2.39
Electors on the lists		47,011	–	–

2012 Quebec general election: Laurier-Dorion
Party	Candidate	Votes	%	±%
Liberal	Gerry Sklavounos	10,987	34.08	-8.82
Parti Québécois	Badiona Bazin	8,524	26.44	-7.38
Québec solidaire	Andrés Fontecilla	7,844	24.33	+11.32
Coalition Avenir Québec	Marie Josée Godbout	3,154	9.78	+5.64*
Option nationale	Miguel Tremblay	912	2.83	–
Green	Danny Polifroni	480	1.49	-3.30
Independent	David H. Cherniak	119	0.37	–
Marxist–Leninist	Peter Macrisopoulos	100	0.31	-0.65
Coalition pour la constituante	Yves Pageau	66	0.20	–
No designation	Michel Dugré	50	0.16	–
Total valid votes		32,236	98.90	–
Total rejected ballots		357	1.10	–
Turnout		32,593	70.21	+21.05
Electors on the lists		46,419	–	–

* Result compared to Action démocratique

Quebec provincial by-election, September 20, 2004: Laurier-Dorion
Party	Candidate	Votes	%	±%
Parti Québécois	Elsie Lefebvre	7,573	46.09	+13.73
Liberal	Voula Neofotistos	7,090	43.15	-9.99
UFP	Andrés Fontecilla	783	4.77	+1.72
Action démocratique	Enrique Colindres	460	2.80	-3.81
Green	Philippe Morlighem	379	2.31	+0.34
Independent	Sonia Bélanger	145	0.88	–
Total valid votes		16,430	98.97	–
Total rejected ballots		171	1.03	–
Turnout		16,601	35.24	-29.12
Electors on the lists		47,107	–	–
