= Green Party of Quebec candidates in the 2012 Quebec provincial election =

The Green Party of Quebec fielded sixty-six candidates in the 2012 Quebec provincial election, none of whom were elected.

Riding	Candidate's Name	Gender	Residence	Occupation	Votes	%	Rank	Notes
Gouin	Sameer Muldeen	M			448	1.33	5th	Muldeen has worked with the Society for the Protection of Animals Canada. In February 2010, he was announced as the Green Party of Canada's critic on animal issues. He contested Rosemont—La Petite-Patrie as a Green Party candidate in the 2011 Canadian federal election.
