= Gerry Sklavounos =

Canadian politician

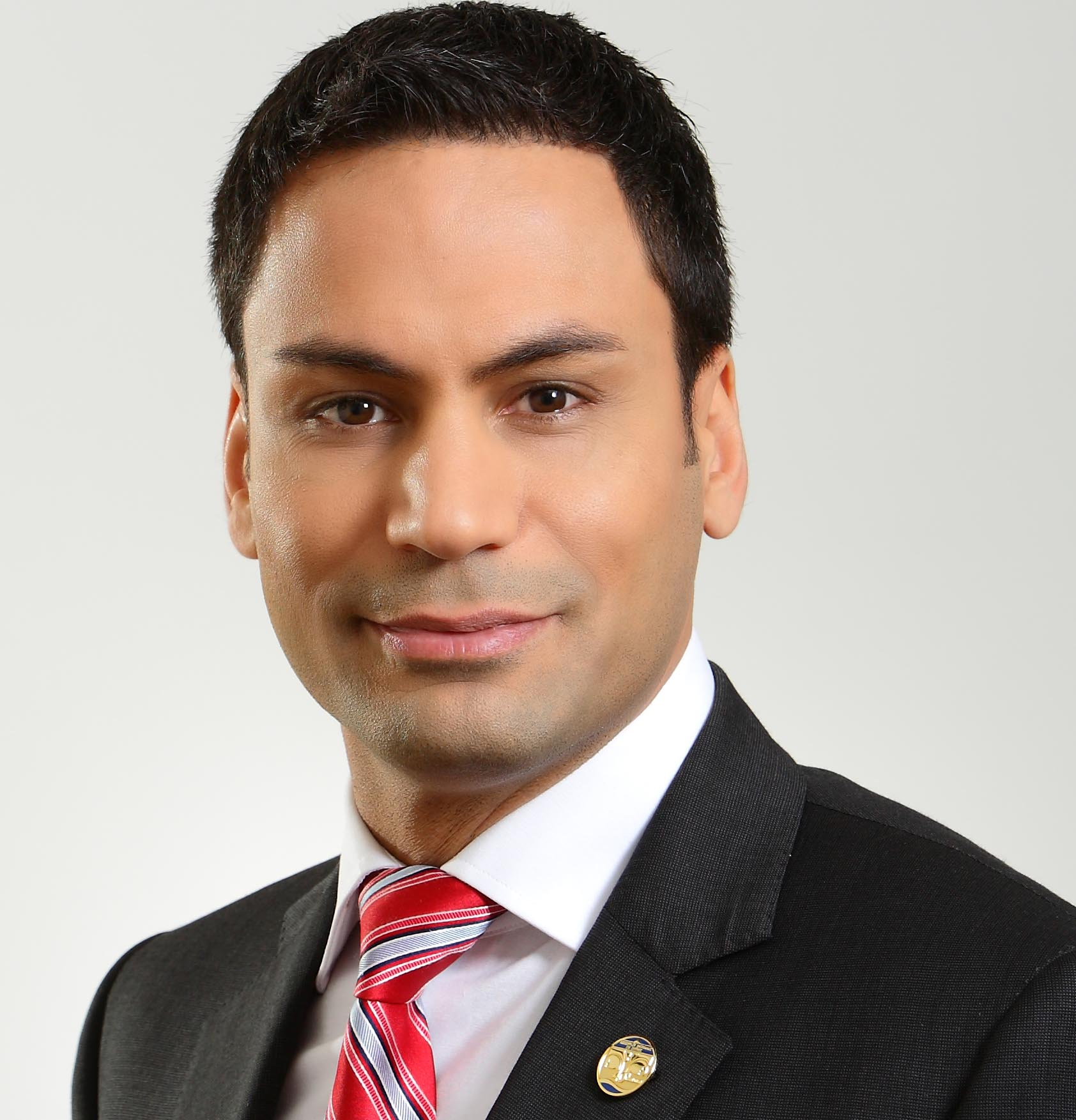

Member of the National Assembly for Laurier-Dorion
- In office March 26, 2007 – August 29, 2018
- Preceded by: Elsie Lefebvre
- Succeeded by: Andrés Fontecilla

Personal details
- Born: December 16, 1974 (age 51) Montreal, Quebec
- Party: Independent; Quebec Liberal Party (until Oct. 2016)
- Children: 3
- Profession: Attorney

Gerry Sklavounos (born December 16, 1974) is a former Quebec politician. He was the Member of the National Assembly for the electoral district of Laurier-Dorion. He is currently an international public affairs and business development consultant at Hygaemon Strategy Corp..

== Early life and career ==
Gerry Sklavounos was born on December 16, 1974, in Montreal, Quebec, Canada. He moved into Laurier-Dorion when he was six years old. He went to Vanier College for CEGEP and graduated in 1994. He earned bachelor's degrees in civil and common law from the McGill University Faculty of Law in 1998.

Sklavounos was called to the Quebec bar in 1999, and articled that year at the federal Department of Justice, working on criminal prosecutions. He practiced criminal law for seven years before becoming a politician, working as legal aid layer for the Community Legal Centre of Montreal from 2000 to 2004 and in private practice with Silver Sandiford Attorneys from 2004 to 2007.

Sklavounos is a member of Montreal's Greek community and has served in executive positions with the Hellenic Canadian Congress and the Hellenic Scholarships Foundation. He was an adviser to the Hellenic Congress of Quebec from 2003 to 2007, the Vice President of public relations for the Hellenic Canadian Congress from 2006 to 2007, and a member of the board of directors for the Hellenic Scholarships Foundation in 2007.

== Provincial politics ==
=== 38th Quebec Legislature ===
Sklavounos was first elected to the Quebec National Assembly in the riding of Laurier-Dorion in the provincial general elections of March 26, 2007. Sklavounos defeated the then-incumbent Member of the Parti Québécois, Elsie Lefebvre, earning 39,66% of the vote versus Lefebvre's 36,06%.

Sklavounos was named Parliamentary Assistant to the Minister of Sustainable Development, Environment and Parks, Line Beauchamp, by Quebec Premier Jean Charest. Sklavounos was also named Vice-Chair of the Committee on Economy and Labour.

He was also Quebec's executive member of the U.S.-based National Conference of State Legislatures (N.C.S.L.) and Quebec's representative at the 9th meeting of the parties to the United Nations Convention on Biological Diversity held in Bonn, Germany, in May 2008.

=== 39th Quebec Legislature ===
Sklavounos was re-elected as Member of the Quebec National Assembly for the riding of Laurier-Dorion in the provincial general elections of December 8, 2008, garnering 42.90% of the vote to defeat his Parti Québécois challenger Badiona Bazin who earned 33.82% of the vote.

In January 2009 Jean Charest appointed Sklavounos Parliamentary Assistant to the Minister of Health and Social Services, Dr. Yves Bolduc. Since May 2009, Sklavounos has also been a member of the Quebec section of the Francophone and Commonwealth Parliamentary Associations. In February 2011, Sklavounos was elected Chairman of the National Assembly's Committee on Health and Social Services, and gave up his parliamentary assistant position.

=== 40th Quebec Legislature ===
Sklavounos was re-elected as Member of the Quebec National Assembly for Laurier-Dorion in the provincial elections of September 4, 2012, garnering 34.04% of the vote. He was named the Official Opposition critic for Higher Education on September 26, 2012, a position he held until he was named Liberal critic for Sustainable Development and the Environment on September 16, 2013. He also served as Official Opposition critic for sustainable development and the environment from September 16, 2013, to March 5, 2014.

Le Devoir columnist, Michel David, in his Opposition Report Card referred to Sklavounos in December 2012 as "without a doubt the most efficient member of the new Liberal rat pack".

=== 41st Quebec Legislature ===
Sklavounos was re-elected in the provincial election held on April 7, 2014, garnering 46.2% of the vote representing 15 566 votes. He defeated Québec Solidaire's Andrés Fontecilla and the Parti Québécois' Pierre Céré who had 27.7% and 15.9% of the vote respectively.

Upon forming his new government, Philippe Couillard appointed Sklavounos Deputy Government House Leader on April 14. Sklavounos was also designated a Member of the Québec Branch of the Commonwealth Parliamentary Association, a Member of the National Assembly Delegation for Relations with the United States (DANREU), Vice-Chair of the Québec Branch of the Parliamentary Confederation of the Americas, and Representative of the Québec Secretariat and Executive Committee of COPA.

On October 20, 2016, Sklavounos stepped down from the Liberal caucus on the day a woman from Quebec City alleged that he sexually assaulted her in 2014. Sklavounos stated that he was innocent and would act to protect his reputation. A week after the incident was first reported, Sklavounos took leave from the National Assembly, citing medical reasons.

On February 2, 2017, following an investigation by Québec City Police, Sklavounos was exonerated by the Director of Criminal and Penal Prosecutions who concluded that "no criminal act had been committed".

On May 11, 2018, Sklavounos announced that he would not be seeking re-election in order to afford more time to his growing family.

== Other functions ==
Since 2009, Sklavounos has been a member of the World Hellenic Interparliamentary Association (W.H.I.A.) and represented Canada on its executive committee from 2015 until 2019.

== Personal life and honours ==
In June 2010, the Greek America Foundation selected Sklavounos as one of North America's top 40 leaders of Hellenic origin under 40 years of age.

In October 2012, he was awarded the Queen Elizabeth II Diamond Jubilee Medal for his contribution to Quebec society.

In 2017, he received his 10-year Parliamentary Life plaque from the National Assembly of Quebec.

Gerry Sklavounos is married and has three children.
