= 2004 Quebec provincial by-elections =

The Quebec by-elections of September 20, 2004 were held in the Quebec provincial electoral districts of Gouin, Laurier-Dorion, Nelligan and Vanier in Canada. They resulted in the election of two PQ, one Liberal and one ADQ Member to the National Assembly of Quebec.

Liberal Yolande James won an easy victory on the Montreal-based Nelligan district, while PQ candidate Nicolas Girard handily succeeded Andre Boisclair in Gouin.

Elsie Lefebvre of the Parti Québécois won a narrow victory in Laurier-Dorion, a traditionally Liberal district.

Benefiting from anger over the CRTC's decision to revoke CHOI-FM's broadcasting license, Sylvain Légaré was elected in Vanier, under the ADQ label.
