= Laurier-Dorion =

Provincial electoral district in Quebec, Canada

Coordinates: 45°32′00″N 73°37′30″W

Quebec electoral district
- Location in Montreal

Provincial electoral district
- Legislature: National Assembly of Quebec
MNA
Andrés Fontecilla
Québec solidaire
- District created: 1992
- First contested: 1994
- Last contested: 2026

Demographics
- Population (2011): 73,480
- Electors (2014): 47,011
- Area (km²): 6.2
- Pop. density (per km²): 11,851.6
- Census division: Montreal (part)
- Census subdivision: Montreal (part)

Laurier-Dorion (French pronunciation: [loʁje dɔʁjɔ̃]) is a provincial electoral district in the Montreal region of Quebec, Canada, that elects members to the National Assembly of Quebec. It consists of the neighbourhoods of Villeray and Park Extension in the city of Montreal.

It was created for the 1994 election from parts of Laurier and Dorion electoral districts.

In the change from the 2001 to the 2011 electoral map, its territory was unchanged.

== Members of the National Assembly ==
Legislature	Years	Member	Party
Riding created from Laurier and Dorion
35th	1994–1998	Christos Sirros	Liberal
36th	1998–2003	Christos Sirros	Liberal
37th	2003–2004	Christos Sirros	Liberal
37th	2004–2007	Elsie Lefebvre	Parti Québécois
38th	2007–2008	Gerry Sklavounos	Liberal
39th	2008–2012	Gerry Sklavounos	Liberal
40th	2012–2014	Gerry Sklavounos	Liberal
41st	2014–2016	Gerry Sklavounos	Liberal
41st	2016–2018	Gerry Sklavounos	Independent
42nd	2018–2022	Andrés Fontecilla	Québec solidaire
43rd	2022–2026	Andrés Fontecilla	Québec solidaire
44th	2026–Present	Andrés Fontecilla	Québec solidaire

== Election results ==
2026 Quebec general election
** Preliminary results — Not yet official **
Party	Candidate	Votes	%	±%
Québec solidaire	Andrés Fontecilla	14,577	50.66	+2.12
Liberal	Randy Legault-Rankin	8,033	27.92	+8.49
Parti Québécois	Kelly Lazo de la Vega	3,494	12.14	+1.95
Conservative	Marc-Antoine Cusson	1,280	4.45	–1.07
Coalition Avenir Québec	Emil Parfyonov	704	2.45	–9.27
Canadian	Jenifer Gomes	216	0.75	N/A
Communist	Stéphane Doucet	124	0.23	N/A
Climat Québec	Louis Poirier	100	0.35	+0.08
Parti culinaire	Jean-Louis Thémis	99	0.34	–0.23
Parti nul	Mathieu Marcil	97	0.34	+0.06
Démocratie directe	Olivier Lamanque Galarneau	52	0.18	N/A
Total valid votes		28,776	98.85	+0.26
Total rejected ballots		335	1.15	–0.26
Turnout		29,111	65.48	+3.86
Electors on the lists		44,455		
Québec solidaire hold		Swing		–3.19
Source: Élections Québec

2022 Quebec general election
Party	Candidate	Votes	%	±%
Québec solidaire	Andrés Fontecilla	13,323	48.80	+1.52
Liberal	Deepak Awasti	5,344	19.57	-10.09
Coalition Avenir Québec	Vicki Marcoux	3,203	11.73	+2.88
Parti Québécois	Maxime Larochelle	2,800	10.26	+2.47
Conservative	Guy Diotte	1,512	5.54	+4.36
Bloc Montreal	Amir Khan	480	1.76	–
Green	Ismaila Marega	332	1.22	-0.54
Parti culinaire	Amélie Villeneuve	157	0.58	+0.02
Parti nul	Mathieu Marcil	77	0.28	-0.18
Climat Québec	Anthony Van Duyse	75	0.27	–
Total valid votes		27,303	98.59	–
Total rejected ballots		391	1.41	–
Turnout		27,694	61.62	
Electors on the lists		44,943		

2018 Quebec general election
Party	Candidate	Votes	%	±%
Québec solidaire	Andrés Fontecilla	14,226	47.28	+19.59
Liberal	George Tsantrizos	8,925	29.66	-16.53
Coalition Avenir Québec	Simon Langelier	2,664	8.85	+1.64
Parti Québécois	Marie-Aline Vadius	2,344	7.79	-8.14
New Democratic	Apostolia Petropoulos	574	1.91	
Green	Juan Vazquez	530	1.76	+0.33
Conservative	Mohammad Yousuf	354	1.18	
Parti culinaire	Chef Jean Louis Thémis	169	0.56	
Parti nul	Mathieu Marcil	137	0.46	
Bloc Pot	Hugô St-Onge	73	0.24	-0.18
Citoyens au pouvoir	Eric Lessard	60	0.2	
Marxist–Leninist	Arezki Malek	35	0.12	-0.22
Total valid votes		30,091	98.77	
Total rejected ballots		375	1.23	
Turnout		30,466	63.59	
Eligible voters		47,910		
Québec solidaire gain from Liberal		Swing		+18.06
Source(s) "Rapport des résultats officiels du scrutin". Élections Québec.

2014 Quebec general election
Party	Candidate	Votes	%	±%
Liberal	Gerry Sklavounos	15,566	46.19	+12.11
Québec solidaire	Andrés Fontecilla	9,330	27.69	+3.36
Parti Québécois	Pierre Céré	5,369	15.93	-10.51
Coalition Avenir Québec	Valérie Assouline	2,431	7.21	-2.57
Green	Jeremy Tessier	482	1.43	-0.06
Option nationale	Miguel Tremblay	263	0.78	-2.05
Bloc Pot	Hugô St-Onge	143	0.42	–
Marxist–Leninist	Peter Macrisopoulos	116	0.34	+0.03
Total valid votes		33,700	98.74	–
Total rejected ballots		429	1.26	–
Turnout		34,129	72.60	+2.39
Electors on the lists		47,011	–	–

2012 Quebec general election
Party	Candidate	Votes	%	±%
Liberal	Gerry Sklavounos	10,987	34.08	-8.82
Parti Québécois	Badiona Bazin	8,524	26.44	-7.38
Québec solidaire	Andrés Fontecilla	7,844	24.33	+11.32
Coalition Avenir Québec	Marie Josée Godbout	3,154	9.78	+5.64*
Option nationale	Miguel Tremblay	912	2.83	–
Green	Danny Polifroni	480	1.49	-3.30
Independent	David H. Cherniak	119	0.37	–
Marxist–Leninist	Peter Macrisopoulos	100	0.31	-0.65
Coalition pour la constituante	Yves Pageau	66	0.20	–
No designation	Michel Dugré	50	0.16	–
Total valid votes		32,236	98.90	–
Total rejected ballots		357	1.10	–
Turnout		32,593	70.21	+21.05
Electors on the lists		46,419	–	–

* Result compared to Action démocratique

2008 Quebec general election
Party	Candidate	Votes	%	±%
Liberal	Gerry Sklavounos	9,769	42.90	+3.24
Parti Québécois	Badiona Bazin	7,700	33.82	-2.24
Québec solidaire	Ruba Ghazal	2,963	13.01	+5.02
Green	Michel Lemay	1,090	4.79	-0.60
Action démocratique	Olivier Manceau	943	4.14	-5.31
Marxist–Leninist	Peter Macrisopoulos	219	0.96	+0.41
No designation	Michel Prairie	86	0.38	–
Total valid votes		22,770	98.34	–
Total rejected ballots		385	1.66	–
Turnout		23,155	49.16	-16.22
Electors on the lists		47,097	–	–

2007 Quebec general election
Party	Candidate	Votes	%	±%
Liberal	Gerry Sklavounos	12,064	39.66	-3.49
Parti Québécois	Elsie Lefebvre	10,968	36.06	-10.03
Action démocratique	Louise Levesque	2,874	9.45	+6.65
Québec solidaire	Ruba Ghazal	2,431	7.99	+3.22*
Green	Sébastien Chagnon-Jean	1,639	5.39	+3.08
Marxist–Leninist	Peter Macrisopoulos	166	0.55	–
Independent	Vassilios Gerakis	160	0.53	–
No designation	Mostafa Ben Kirane	115	0.38	–
Total valid votes		30,417	98.73	–
Total rejected ballots		392	1.27	–
Turnout		30,809	65.38	+30.14
Electors on the lists		47,121	–	–

* Increase is from UFP

Quebec provincial by-election, September 20, 2004
Party	Candidate	Votes	%	±%
Parti Québécois	Elsie Lefebvre	7,573	46.09	+13.73
Liberal	Voula Neofotistos	7,090	43.15	-9.99
UFP	Andrés Fontecilla	783	4.77	+1.72
Action démocratique	Enrique Colindres	460	2.80	-3.81
Green	Philippe Morlighem	379	2.31	+0.34
Independent	Sonia Bélanger	145	0.88	–
Total valid votes		16,430	98.97	–
Total rejected ballots		171	1.03	–
Turnout		16,601	35.24	-29.12
Electors on the lists		47,107	–	–

2003 Quebec general election
Party	Candidate	Votes	%	±%
Liberal	Christos Sirros	16,052	53.14	-3.56
Parti Québécois	Tomas Arbieto	9,775	32.36	+0.71
Action démocratique	Mario Spina	1,996	6.61	-0.85
UFP	William Sloan	922	3.05	–
Green	Philippe Morlighem	595	1.97	–
Bloc Pot	Sylvain Mainville	375	1.24	-0.14
Marxist–Leninist	Peter Macrisopoulos	168	0.56	-0.03
No designation	Charles Robidoux	131	0.43	–
No designation	Sylvie Charbin	117	0.38	–
Equality	Yang Zhang	78	0.26	–
Total valid votes		30,209	98.39	–
Total rejected ballots		495	1.61	–
Turnout		30,704	64.36	-11.85
Electors on the lists		47,705	–	–

0.20
1998 Quebec general election
Party	Candidate	Votes	%	±%
Liberal	Christos Sirros	19,471	56.70	+1.17
Parti Québécois	Robert Loranger	10,868	31.65	−3.11
Action démocratique	Fernand Bélisle	2,561	7.46	+2.29
Socialist Democracy	Milan Mirich	490	1.43	
Bloc Pot	Marc-André Gagnon	474	1.38	
Marxist–Leninist	Panagiotis Macrisopoulos	203	0.59	+0.22
Communist	John Manolis	159	0.46	−0.16
Independent	Mostafa Ben Kirane	113	0.33	
Total valid votes		34,339	100.00	
Rejected and declined votes		560		
Turnout		34,899	76.21	−5.44
Electors on the lists		45,792		
Source: Official Results, Le Directeur général des élections du Québec.

1995 Quebec referendum
Side	Votes	%
Non	25,924	62.78
Oui	15,372	37.22

1994 Quebec general election
Party	Candidate	Votes	%
Liberal	Christos Sirros	18,522	55.53
Parti Québécois	Benoit Henry	11,592	34.76
Action démocratique	Fernand Bélisle	1,723	5.17
New Democratic	Milan Mirich	409	1.23
Commonwealth of Canada	Christian Chouery	329	0.99
Natural Law	André Fleurant	274	0.82
Communist	Panayiote Georgopoulos	206	0.62
Développement Québec	Pierre-Paul Laurence	172	0.52
Marxist–Leninist	Panagiotis Macrisopoulos	125	0.37
Total valid votes		33,352	100.00
Rejected and declined votes		712	
Turnout		34,064	81.65
Electors on the lists		41,718	
Source: Official Results, Le Directeur général des élections du Québec.

== See also ==
- List of Quebec provincial electoral districts
- Canadian provincial electoral districts
