= Hugô St-Onge =

Canadian politician

Leader of the Bloc pot
- Incumbent
- Assumed office 2002
- Preceded by: Alexandre Néron

Interim Leader of the Nova Scotia Marijuana Party of Canada (unregistered)
- In office Early may, 2000 – Late may, 2000
- Preceded by: Party founded*
- Succeeded by: Unknown

Hugô St-Onge is a politician in Quebec, Canada. Since 2002, he has been the leader of the Bloc pot. The Bloc pot is a Quebec political party dedicated to the end of marijuana prohibition.

He founded in 1999 along with other Bloc pot activists the Club compassion of Montreal a collective project to distribute cannabis for medicinal uses.

In May 2000 he collaborated in the creation a new political party in Nova Scotia called The Marijuana Party of Canada.

== Electoral record ==
- 2007 Quebec general election, Gouin, 147 votes (winning candidate: Nicolas Girard, Parti Québécois)
- 2006 Canadian federal election, Rosemont—La Petite-Patrie, 419 votes (winning candidate: Bernard Bigras, Bloc Québécois)
- Quebec by-election, 2004, Gouin, 148 votes (winning candidate: Nicolas Girard, Parti Québécois)
- 2003 Nova Scotia general election, Dartmouth East, 101 votes (winning candidate: Joan Massey, New Democratic Party)
- 2003 Quebec general election, Gouin, 465 votes (winning candidate: André Boisclair, Parti Québécois)
- Quebec by-election, 2001, Labelle, 350 votes (winning candidate: Sylvain Pagé, Parti Québécois)
- 1998 Quebec general election, Marguerite-D'Youville, 327 votes (winning candidate: François Beaulne, Parti Québécois)
