= Parti culinaire du Québec =

Political party in Quebec

- Leader: Jean-Louis Thémis
- Founded: 2018
- Ideology: Creation of a "Gastronocracy"
- Seats in the National Assembly: 0 / 127

Website
- http://www.particulinaireduquebec.org/

The Parti culinaire du Québec (French pronunciation: [paʁti kylinɛʁ dy kebɛk]) is a minor provincial political party in Quebec, Canada. Founded in 2018 by Madagascar-born Quebec chef Jean-Louis Thémis, it aims to educate Quebec voters about food and respect for nature.

== Background ==
Jean-Louis Thémis was born Jean-Louis Thémistocle Randriantiana in Madagascar in the 1950s, and moved to Quebec in 1972. Thémis has held a variety of positions in Quebec, including former head of Metro-Richelieu, founder of Cuisiniers sans Frontières (which teaches cooking to low-income communities internationally), and most recently as a teacher at Institut de tourisme et d'hôtellerie du Québec. He announced his retirement from the ITHQ to pursue this project.

== Ideology ==
The keystone of the party's ideology involves the creation of a "gastronocracy", in which farmers and food producers would be viewed as the elites in society. No government decisions would be made that would jeopardize Quebec's food supply, using the proposed Energy East pipeline as an example.

Themis has called for an end to Sunday shopping so that families could eat together, improving food in hospitals and community health centers and the creation of a Ministry of Gastronomy.

The party would like to see artisanal restaurants using local and organic ingredients exempted from Quebec Sales Tax.

== Election results ==
In the 2018 Quebec election, Themis was the party's only candidate, in his home riding of Laurier-Dorion. He received 169 votes, or 0.54% of the votes cast in the riding.

In the subsequent 2022 election, the party presented two candidates. Thémis was the party's candidate in the riding of Gouin, where he received 199 votes, or 0.68% of votes cast in the riding. Amélie Villeneuve ran in Laurier-Dorion, where they received 157 votes, or 0.58% of the votes cast in the riding.

The party stood in the 2025 Terrebonne provincial by-election, coming in 7th place with 145 votes (0.64%).
