= Elsie Lefebvre =

Canadian politician

Elsie Lefebvre MNA

Member of the National Assembly for Berthier
- Incumbent
- Assumed office October 5, 2026
- Preceded by: Caroline Proulx

Member of the National Assembly for Laurier-Dorion
- In office September 20, 2004 – March 26, 2007
- Preceded by: Christos Sirros
- Succeeded by: Gerry Sklavounos

Montreal City Councillor for Villeray
- In office 2009–2017
- Preceded by: Sylvain Lachance
- Succeeded by: Rosannie Filato

Personal details
- Born: May 5, 1979 (age 47) Montreal, Quebec, Canada
- Party: Parti Québécois; Coalition Montreal; Vision Montreal (formerly)

Elsie Lefebvre (born May 5, 1979, in Montreal, Quebec) is a Quebec politician. She was the Member of the National Assembly for the Laurier-Dorion riding from 2004 to 2007, and later served on Montreal City Council. She is trilingual, speaking French, Spanish and English.

== Profile ==
=== Background ===
Lefebvre has been involved in politics, with the Parti Québécois (PQ), since the age of 17. Following her bachelor's degree in political science at Université de Montréal, her studies took her to the Universidad de las Américas in Puebla, Puebla, Mexico. There she gathered much political experience, notably as an intern at the Quebec Government House in Mexico City and as parliamentary assistant to French politician Philippe Séguin.

=== Election ===
In 2004, she won the Parti Québécois candidacy for the coming by-election in her native riding, Laurier-Dorion, and began a campaign of outspoken left-wing and sovereigntist politics (opposing the Charest government). On September 20, 2004, at the age of 25, she became the youngest elected female MNA in the National Assembly of Quebec's history. Her arrival was touted by some as the sovereigntist new blood and breath of fresh air for the party and movement. Four by-elections occurred on the day of her victory. The Liberals lost all but one (with a smaller victory than usual for one of the strongest Liberal fortresses, Nelligan), with the PQ winning two and the Action démocratique du Québec one.

Coming at a time when the Charest government was low in opinion polls, her victory in the Laurier-Dorion was described as historic for reasons other than Lefebvre's relative youth. Laurier (later merged with the riding of Dorion) had been won only once before by the PQ, by Lise Payette, and had been held by Liberal Christos Sirros for two decades. As one of the most multicultural ridings in Quebec, the surprise victory was seen as a major step in the long ongoing PQ "charm operation" towards Quebec cultural minorities. In addition, the riding is remembered as the first riding of the party founder René Lévesque. Twice elected in Laurier as a Liberal, Lévesque never managed to win it with the PQ, despite being party leader.

Lefebvre lost her Montreal seat to the Quebec Liberal Party in the 2007 provincial election.

=== Parliament ===
Lefebvre was the Official Opposition critic for immigration and cultural communities during her tenure in office.

In June 2005, after answering her question in the National Assembly about a possible conflict of interest involving his spouse, Premier Jean Charest mumbled "hostie de chienne", an insult which would roughly translate in English as "fucking bitch".

Lefebvre supported then-leader Bernard Landry in February 2005 in the Parti Québécois leadership race. In September 2005, she announced her support for Richard Legendre.

=== Montreal City Council ===
Lefebvre was recruited by Vision Montréal as a high-profile candidate for Montreal City Council in November 2009, in the district of Villeray in the borough of Villeray–Saint-Michel–Parc-Extension. She won the election, defeating incumbent Union Montréal councillor Sylvain Lachance. When she joined municipal politics, she said the political milieu in Montreal was hampered by factionalism.

She won re-election in 2013 under the party Coalition Montreal.

Lefebvre announced in June 2017 that she would become an independent councilor before choosing which party she will join for the next elections. On 13 June 2017 Mayor Denis Coderre dropped councilor Marvin Rotrand from the role of Vice-Chair of the Société de transport de Montréal and replaced him with Lefebvre.

Lefebvre announced in August 2017 that she would join the mayor's Équipe Denis Coderre pour Montréal for the November 2017 municipal elections. She said working with the Coderre government on files like transit electrification and banning plastic bags convinced her to join his team. She said she feels the partisan atmosphere changed since Coderre’s election in 2013.

Lefebvre subsequently lost to Rosannie Filato, a lawyer with the Projet Montreal party.
