= Gouin (electoral district) =

Provincial electoral district in Quebec, Canada

Quebec electoral district
- Location in Montreal
- Coordinates: 45.536°N 73.594°W

Provincial electoral district
- Legislature: National Assembly of Quebec
MNA
Alexandre Boulerice
Québec solidaire
- District created: 1965
- First contested: 1966
- Last contested: 2026

Demographics
- Population (2011): 59,345
- Electors (2014): 43,831
- Area (km²): 5.8
- Pop. density (per km²): 10,231.9
- Census division: Montreal (part)
- Census subdivision: Montreal (part)

Gouin (French pronunciation: [ɡwɛ̃]) is a provincial electoral district in the Montreal region of the province of Quebec, Canada, that elects members to the National Assembly of Quebec. It consists of part of the Rosemont–La Petite-Patrie borough of Montreal. The riding covers the neighbourhoods of La Petite-Patrie and Parc Molson, plus a small part of Vieux-Rosemont.

It was created for the 1966 election from parts of Montréal-Laurier and Montréal–Jeanne-Mance.

Its territory was unchanged during the switch from the 2001 to the 2011 electoral map.

It is named after former Quebec Premier, Lomer Gouin, who was in power from 1905 to 1920.

== Members of the National Assembly ==
| Legislature | Years | Member | Party |
|---|---|---|---|
Riding created from Montréal-Laurier and Montréal–Jeanne-Mance
| 28th | 1966–1969 | Yves Michaud | Liberal |
| 28th | 1969–1970 | Yves Michaud | Independent |
| 29th | 1970–1973 | Guy Joron | Parti Québécois |
| 30th | 1973–1976 | Jean-Marie Beauregard | Liberal |
| 31st | 1977–1979 | Rodrigue Tremblay | Parti Québécois |
| 31st | 1979–1981 | Rodrigue Tremblay | Independent |
| 32nd | 1981–1985 | Jacques Rochefort | Parti Québécois |
| 33rd | 1985–1987 | Jacques Rochefort | Parti Québécois |
| 33rd | 1987–1989 | Jacques Rochefort | Independent |
| 34th | 1989–1994 | André Boisclair | Parti Québécois |
| 35th | 1994–1998 | André Boisclair | Parti Québécois |
| 36th | 1998–2003 | André Boisclair | Parti Québécois |
| 37th | 2003–2004 | André Boisclair | Parti Québécois |
| 37th | 2004–2007 | Nicolas Girard | Parti Québécois |
| 38th | 2007–2008 | Nicolas Girard | Parti Québécois |
| 39th | 2008–2012 | Nicolas Girard | Parti Québécois |
| 40th | 2012–2014 | Françoise David | Québec solidaire |
| 41st | 2014–2017 | Françoise David | Québec solidaire |
| 41st | 2017–2018 | Gabriel Nadeau-Dubois | Québec solidaire |
| 42nd | 2018–2022 | Gabriel Nadeau-Dubois | Québec solidaire |
| 43rd | 2022–2026 | Gabriel Nadeau-Dubois | Québec solidaire |
| 44th | 2026–Present | Alexandre Boulerice | Québec solidaire |

== Linguistic demographics ==
- Francophone: 78.1%
- Anglophone: 4.7%
- Allophone: 17.2%

== Election results ==
2026 Quebec general election
** Preliminary results — Not yet official **
| Party | Candidate | Votes | % | ±% |
|---|---|---|---|---|
| Québec solidaire | Alexandre Boulerice | 19,431 | 62.61 | +3.17 |
| Parti Québécois | Isabelle Daoust | 5,011 | 16.15 | +2.52 |
| Liberal | Hoang Annie Nguyen | 3,976 | 12.81 | +4.41 |
| Conservative | Edouard Prud'homme | 1,063 | 3.43 | +0.32 |
| Coalition Avenir Québec | Frank Tremblay | 953 | 3.07 | –9.30 |
| Green | Camille Jannard | 296 | 0.95 | –1.12 |
| Parti nul | Elizabeth Laferrière | 201 | 0.65 | ±0.00 |
| Climat Québec | Jean-Claude Saint-André | 85 | 0.27 | N/A |
| Équipe Autonomiste | Charles McNicoll | 18 | 0.06 | N/A |
| Total valid votes | | 31,034 | 98.96 | –0.17 |
| Total rejected ballots | | 326 | 1.04 | +0.17 |
| Turnout | | 31,360 | 72.62 | +3.05 |
| Electors on the lists | | 43,186 | | |
| Québec solidaire hold | | Swing | | +0.33 |
Source: Élections Québec

2022 Quebec general election
| Party | Candidate | Votes | % | ±% |
|---|---|---|---|---|
| Québec solidaire | Gabriel Nadeau-Dubois | 17,283 | 59.44 | +0.30 |
| Parti Québécois | Vincent Delorme | 3,962 | 13.63 | -1.25 |
| Coalition Avenir Québec | Catherine Pelletier | 3,596 | 12.37 | +2.47 |
| Liberal | Rita Ikhouane | 2,444 | 8.40 | -3.06 |
| Conservative | Jayson Paquette Gendron | 903 | 3.11 | – |
| Green | Valérie Vedrines | 602 | 2.07 | -1.38 |
| Parti culinaire | Chef Thémis | 199 | 0.68 | – |
| Parti nul | Jean-Benoit Garneau-Bédard | 89 | 0.31 | -0.5 |
| Total valid votes | | 29,078 | 99.13 | – |
| Total rejected ballots | | 256 | 0.87 | – |
| Turnout | | 29,334 | 69.57 | |
| Electors on the lists | | 42,164 | | |

2018 Quebec general election
| Party | Candidate | Votes | % | ±% |
|---|---|---|---|---|
| Québec solidaire | Gabriel Nadeau-Dubois | 17,977 | 59.14 | +7.03 |
| Parti Québécois | Olivier Gignac | 4,523 | 14.88 | -5.53 |
| Liberal | Alessandra Lubrina | 3,483 | 11.46 | -6.34 |
| Coalition Avenir Québec | Arianne Lebel | 3,011 | 9.9 | +1.23 |
| Green | Alice Sécheresse | 1,049 | 3.45 | |
| Parti nul | Jenny Cartwright | 246 | 0.81 | -0.3 |
| Bloc Pot | Ana da Silva | 110 | 0.36 | |
| Total valid votes | | 30,399 | 98.80 | |
| Total rejected ballots | | 370 | 1.20 | |
| Turnout | | 30,769 | 69.62 | |
| Eligible voters | | 44,196 | | |
| Québec solidaire hold | | Swing | | +6.28 |
Source(s) "Rapport des résultats officiels du scrutin". Élections Québec.

Quebec provincial by-election, 2017
| Party | Candidate | Votes | % | ±% |
|---|---|---|---|---|
| Québec solidaire | Gabriel Nadeau-Dubois | 9,872 | 69.30 | +18.32 |
| Liberal | Jonathan Marleau | 1,269 | 8.91 | -8.89 |
| Option nationale | Vanessa Dion | 1,116 | 7.83 | +6.70 |
| Coalition Avenir Québec | Benjamin Bélair | 954 | 6.70 | -1.97 |
| Green | Alex Tyrrell | 651 | 4.57 | – |
| Bloc Pot | Jean-Patrick Berthiaume | 113 | 0.79 | – |
| Parti indépendantiste | Alexandre Cormier-Denis | 81 | 0.57 | – |
| Conservative | Samuel Fillion-Doiron | 70 | 0.49 | – |
| Parti des sans Parti | Nicole Goulet | 34 | 0.24 | – |
| Parti libre | Michel Leclerc | 34 | 0.24 | – |
| Independent | François-Xavier Richard-Choquette | 24 | 0.17 | – |
| Independent | Sébastien Théodore | 15 | 0.11 | – |
| Équipe Autonomiste | Louis Chandonnet | 12 | 0.08 | – |
| Total valid votes | | 14,245 | 98.32 | – |
| Total rejected ballots | | 243 | 1.68 | – |
| Turnout | | 14,488 | 32.79 | -40.39 |
| Electors on the lists | | 44,185 | – | – |
| Québec solidaire hold | | Swing | | +13.55 |

2014 Quebec general election
| Party | Candidate | Votes | % | ±% |
|---|---|---|---|---|
| Québec solidaire | Françoise David | 16,155 | 50.98 | +4.95 |
| Parti Québécois | Louise Mailloux | 6,438 | 20.31 | -12.17 |
| Liberal | Cheraquie Auguste-Constant | 5,642 | 17.80 | +6.13 |
| Coalition Avenir Québec | Paul Franche | 2,748 | 8.67 | +0.60 |
| Option nationale | Olivier Lacelle | 358 | 1.13 | – |
| Parti nul | Marc Boulanger | 351 | 1.11 | – |
| Total valid votes | | 31,692 | 98.80 | – |
| Total rejected ballots | | 385 | 1.20 | – |
| Turnout | | 32,077 | 73.18 | -4.73 |
| Electors on the lists | | 43,831 | – | – |
| Québec solidaire hold | | Swing | | +8.56 |

2012 Quebec general election
| Party | Candidate | Votes | % | ±% |
|---|---|---|---|---|
| Québec solidaire | Françoise David | 15,483 | 46.03 | +14.18 |
| Parti Québécois | Nicolas Girard | 10,927 | 32.48 | -8.70 |
| Liberal | Anson Duran | 3,924 | 11.67 | -8.26 |
| Coalition Avenir Québec | Bernard Labadie | 2,713 | 8.07 | +4.48* |
| Green | Sameer Muldeen | 448 | 1.33 | -1.89 |
| Unité Nationale | Gilles Guibord | 143 | 0.43 | – |
| Total valid votes | | 33,638 | 99.00 | – |
| Total rejected ballots | | 339 | 1.00 | – |
| Turnout | | 33,977 | 77.91 | +19.88 |
| Electors on the lists | | 43,608 | – | – |
| Québec solidaire gain from Parti Québécois | | Swing | | +11.44 |

* Result compared to Action démocratique

2008 Quebec general election
| Party | Candidate | Votes | % | ±% |
|---|---|---|---|---|
| Parti Québécois | Nicolas Girard | 10,276 | 41.18 | +3.93 |
| Québec solidaire | Françoise David | 7,947 | 31.85 | +5.82 |
| Liberal | Edith Keays | 4,972 | 19.93 | +1.46 |
| Action démocratique | Caroline Giroux | 895 | 3.59 | -8.06 |
| Green | Stephan Merchant | 753 | 3.02 | -2.74 |
| Parti indépendantiste | Jonathan Godin | 110 | 0.44 | – |
| Total valid votes | | 24,953 | 98.73 | – |
| Total rejected ballots | | 321 | 1.27 | – |
| Turnout | | 25,274 | 58.03 | -12.06 |
| Electors on the lists | | 43,554 | – | – |

2007 Quebec general election
| Party | Candidate | Votes | % | ±% |
|---|---|---|---|---|
| Parti Québécois | Nicolas Girard | 11,318 | 37.25 | -20.53 |
| Québec solidaire | Françoise David | 7,910 | 26.03 | +18.06* |
| Liberal | Nathalie Rivard | 5,612 | 18.47 | -5.85 |
| Action démocratique | Jean-Philip Ruel | 3,540 | 11.65 | +6.65 |
| Green | Yohan Tremblay | 1,750 | 5.76 | +2.04 |
| Bloc Pot | Hugô St-Onge | 147 | 0.48 | -0.51 |
| Independent | Jocelyne Leduc | 109 | 0.36 | – |
| Total valid votes | | 30,386 | 99.08 | – |
| Total rejected ballots | | 281 | 0.92 | – |
| Turnout | | 30,667 | 70.09 | +35.63 |
| Electors on the lists | | 43,752 | – | – |

* Result compared to UFP

Quebec provincial by-election, September 20, 2004
| Party | Candidate | Votes | % | ±% |
|---|---|---|---|---|
| Parti Québécois | Nicolas Girard | 8,661 | 57.78 | +4.44 |
| Liberal | Edith Keays | 3,645 | 24.32 | -5.88 |
| UFP | Gaétan Breton | 1 195 | 7.97 | +3.28 |
| Action démocratique | Stéphane Deschênes | 749 | 5.00 | -3.24 |
| Green | Christian Lajoie | 558 | 3.72 | +1.76 |
| Bloc Pot | Hugô St-Onge | 148 | 0.99 | -0.57 |
| Independent | Régent Millette | 33 | 0.22 | – |

2003 Quebec general election
| Party | Candidate | Votes | % | ±% |
|---|---|---|---|---|
| Parti Québécois | André Boisclair | 15,890 | 53.34 | +0.66 |
| Liberal | William Aguilar | 8,996 | 30.20 | -2.42 |
| Action démocratique | Stéphane Deschênes | 2,456 | 8.24 | -2.48 |
| UFP | Colette Provost | 1,397 | 4.69 | – |
| Green | Pierrette Chevalier | 584 | 1.96 | – |
| Bloc Pot | Hugô St-Onge | 465 | 1.56 | – |

1998 Quebec general election
| Party | Candidate | Votes | % | ±% |
|---|---|---|---|---|
| Parti Québécois | André Boisclair | 16,097 | 52.68 | -3.47 |
| Liberal | Michelle Daines | 10,273 | 33.62 | -2.06 |
| Action démocratique | Patricia St-Jacques | 3,276 | 10.72 | – |
| Socialist Democracy | Geneviève Ricard | 624 | 2.04 | -2.62 |
| Marxist–Leninist | Claude Brunelle | 149 | 0.49 | +0.03 |
| Communist | Athanasios Ntouskas | 75 | 0.25 | – |
| No designation | Annette Kouri | 61 | 0.20 | – |

1995 Quebec referendum
| Side | Votes | % |
|---|---|---|
| Oui | 21,854 | 57.77 |
| Non | 15,977 | 42.23 |

1994 Quebec general election
| Party | Candidate | Votes | % | ±% |
|---|---|---|---|---|
| Parti Québécois | André Boisclair | 17,305 | 56.42 | +5.39 |
| Liberal | Athena Efraim | 10,944 | 35.68 | -4.80 |
| New Democratic | Hans Marotte | 1,428 | 4.66 | +2.33 |
| Independent | Sylviane Morin | 458 | 1.49 | – |
| Natural Law | Alain-Édouard Lord | 263 | 0.86 | – |
| Marxist–Leninist | Serge Lachapelle | 142 | 0.46 | +0.16 |
| Republic of Canada | Pierre Aylwin | 132 | 0.43 | – |

1992 Charlottetown Accord referendum
| Side | Votes | % |
|---|---|---|
| Non | 15,155 | 66.20 |
| Oui | 7,737 | 33.80 |

1989 Quebec general election
| Party | Candidate | Votes | % | ±% |
|---|---|---|---|---|
| Parti Québécois | André Boisclair | 10,568 | 51.03 | +2.57 |
| Liberal | Normand Hamel | 8,383 | 40.48 | -4.86 |
| Green | Sylvain Auclair | 929 | 4.49 | – |
| New Democratic | Paul Montpetit | 482 | 2.33 | -0.54 |
| Workers | Gilles Bourque | 186 | 0.90 | – |
| Marxist–Leninist | Michelle Dufort | 63 | 0.30 | – |
| Communist | Denis Gervais | 52 | 0.25 | – |
| Socialist Movement | Yvan Comeau | 46 | 0.22 | – |

1985 Quebec general election
| Party | Candidate | Votes | % | ±% |
|---|---|---|---|---|
| Parti Québécois | Jacques Rochefort | 11,212 | 48.46 | -9.31 |
| Liberal | Jean L’Abbé | 10,490 | 45.34 | +6.91 |
| New Democratic | Jacques Derosiers | 665 | 2.87 | – |
| Parti indépendantiste | Yvon J. Hachey | 341 | 1.47 | – |
| Progressive Conservative | Lorenzo Bonneau | 181 | 0.78 | – |
| Humanist | Hernani Da Costa | 146 | 0.63 | – |
| Republic of Canada | Richard Ritarose | 52 | 0.23 | – |
| Christian Socialist | Jean-François Cloutier | 51 | 0.22 | – |

1981 Quebec general election
| Party | Candidate | Votes | % | ±% |
|---|---|---|---|---|
| Parti Québécois | Jacques Rochefort | 15,563 | 57.77 | +4.24 |
| Liberal | Jean Longpré | 10,354 | 38.43 | +4.82 |
| Union Nationale | Gilles LeBlanc | 605 | 2.25 | -7.00 |
| Workers' Communist | Louise Baillargeon | 159 | 0.59 | – |
| Communist | Claude Demers | 78 | 0.29 | – |
| Marxist–Leninist | Bernard Deslières | 67 | 0.25 | – |
| Independent | Lorenzo Bonneau | 66 | 0.24 | – |
| United Social Credit | Camille Marquis | 48 | 0.18 | -2.79 |

1980 Quebec referendum
| Side | Votes | % |
|---|---|---|
| Non | 13,051 | 51.29 |
| Oui | 12,395 | 48.71 |

1976 Quebec general election
| Party | Candidate | Votes | % | ±% |
|---|---|---|---|---|
| Parti Québécois | Rodrigue Tremblay | 14,360 | 53.53 | +7.90 |
| Liberal | Jean M. Beauregard | 9,015 | 33.61 | -14.47 |
| Union Nationale | Yves Roy | 2,482 | 9.25 | +7.10 |
| Ralliement créditiste | J. Alfred Levesque | 797 | 2.97 | -1.17 |
| Workers | Céline Lenoir Boulanger | 94 | 0.35 | – |
| NDP – RMS coalition | Wilbray Thiffault | 78 | 0.29 | – |

1973 Quebec general election
| Party | Candidate | Votes | % | ±% |
|---|---|---|---|---|
| Liberal | Jean M. Beauregard | 12,506 | 48.08 | +7.24 |
| Parti Québécois | Guy Joron | 11,870 | 45.63 | +4.76 |
| Parti créditiste | Yves Roy | 1,078 | 4.14 | +0.53 |
| Union Nationale | Michel Amyot | 560 | 2.15 | -12.53 |

1970 Quebec general election
| Party | Candidate | Votes | % | ±% |
|---|---|---|---|---|
| Parti Québécois | Guy Joron | 14,070 | 40.87 | – |
| Liberal | Yves Michaud | 14,058 | 40.84 | -6.48 |
| Union Nationale | Louis Chantigny | 5,053 | 14.68 | -22.39 |
| Ralliement créditiste | Edward Bowen | 1,242 | 3.61 | – |

1966 Quebec general election
| Party | Candidate | Votes | % |
|---|---|---|---|
| Liberal | Yves Michaud | 12,916 | 47.32 |
| Union Nationale | Gérard Gosselin | 10,117 | 37.07 |
| RIN | Bernard Morrier | 3,507 | 12.85 |
| Ralliement national | Jean Fefebvre | 646 | 2.37 |
| Independent | Charles-Henri Lutz | 108 | 0.40 |

== See also ==
- List of Quebec provincial electoral districts
- Canadian provincial electoral districts
