= Parti nul =

Political party in Quebec, Canada

Parti NUL
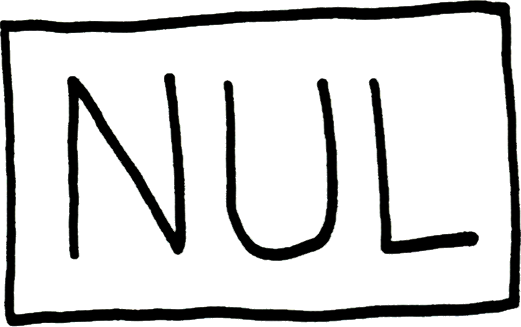
- Leader: Renaud Blais
- Founded: 9 April 2009; 17 years ago
- Headquarters: Quebec City, Quebec
- Ideology: Protest voting Abstentionism
- Colours: Black, gray

Website
- www.partinul.net

The parti NUL (French pronunciation: [paʁti nyl], lit. 'Null Party') is a political party in the Canadian province of Quebec. It was founded after the 2008 provincial election on 9 April 2009. The party bills itself as a protest party, a way for citizens to show their displeasure at the existing political structure in the province. The party has no platform and is abstentionist.

== Leadership ==
- Renaud Blais (2009–present)

== Election results ==
General election results of Parti NUL
| Election | # of candidates | # of elected candidates | % of popular vote | Place |
|---|---|---|---|---|
| 2012 | 10 / 125 | 0 | 0.06% | 9th |
| 2014 | 24 / 125 | 0 | 0.18% | 8th |
| 2018 | 16 / 125 | 0 | 0.09% | 10th |
| 2022 | 9 / 125 | 0 | 0.03% | 11th |
| 2026 | 38 / 127 | 0 | 0.19% | 9th |
