= Member of the National Assembly (Quebec) =

Member of Canadian provincial legislature

A member of the National Assembly (MNA, French: député) is a member of the National Assembly of Quebec, the unicameral house of the provincial Parliament of Québec. The term has been used to describe provincial assembly members since 1968, when the National Assembly of Quebec was renamed. Prior to the name change members of the assembly were titled as members of Provincial Parliament from 1955 to 1968, and were unofficially referred to as members of the Legislative Assembly prior to 1955.

== History ==
Before 1968, the Parliament of Québec was a bicameral legislature with a lower and upper house named the Legislative Assembly of Quebec and Legislative Council of Quebec respectively. Like almost all the other provinces, members of Quebec's lower house were originally referred to as members of the Legislative Assembly (MLAs) (fr:membres de l'Assemblée législative (M.A.L.s)), however this changed following a bill to adopt the titular designation "Member of Provincial Parliament" (fr:membre du Parlement provincial) and the initialism "MPP" (fr:M.P.P.) was assented on December 15, 1955. The bill to change the titular designation was supported by Quebec premier Maurice Duplessis, who gave a speech in support of it in the legislative assembly. The reasons he gave for this change were the following:

1. The French acronym for "Member of the Legislative Assembly" (M.A.L.) can sometimes be pronounced as "mal", which means "evil" in French.
2. Quebec's legislature has all the fiscal and constitutional prerogatives to be considered a "Parliament", and the new designation would better reflect that.
3. The new designation would be a return to the original designation used before confederation.
4. The Acronym MPP is the same in French and in English.

The designation was changed again in 1968 when the Legislative Council was abolished, and the Legislative Assembly was renamed as the National Assembly. The member's titular designation was "Member of the Quebec Parliament" (MQP, or membre du Parlement du Québec (M.P.Q)) from 1968 to 1971, then "Member of the National Assembly" (MNA, or membres de l'Assemblée Nationale (M.A.N.) from 1971 to 1982.

The designation "Member of the National Assembly" is still used in English, but the French titular designation was abolished, and MNAs are now simply referred to as "député", the same title used for federal members of Parliament and for the members of other provincial assemblies.

== See also ==
In other jurisdictions within Canada, the titles used are:

- "Member of Provincial Parliament" (MPP) in Ontario
- "Member of the House of Assembly" (MHA) in Newfoundland and Labrador
- "Member of the Legislative Assembly" (MLA) in all other provinces and territories.
