= André Boisclair =

Canadian politician and sex offender (born 1966)

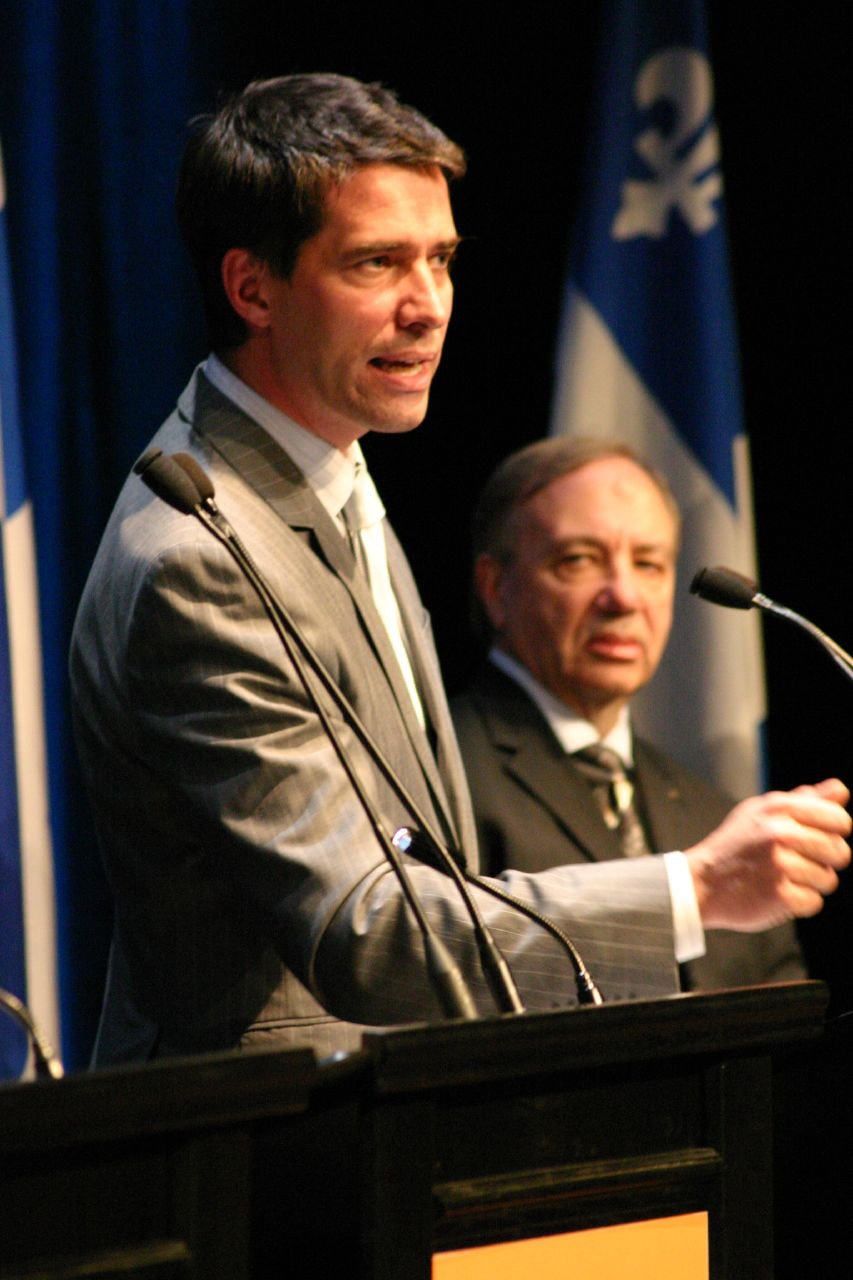
- Boisclair debating in 2005

Delegate General of Quebec in New York
- In office November 7, 2012 – September 27, 2013
- Premier: Pauline Marois
- Preceded by: John Parisella
- Succeeded by: Dominique Poirier

Leader of the Opposition of Quebec
- In office August 21, 2006 – May 26, 2007
- Preceded by: Louise Harel
- Succeeded by: Mario Dumont

Leader of the Parti Québécois
- In office November 15, 2005 – May 8, 2007
- President: Monique Richard
- Preceded by: Louise Harel (interim)
- Succeeded by: François Gendron (interim)
Quebec Executive Council
Government House Leader
In office January 29, 2002 – April 29, 2003
Premier	Bernard Landry
Preceded by	Jacques Brassard
Succeeded by	Jacques Dupuis
Minister of the Environment (Note: Office known as "Minister of State for the Environment and Water" from 2001 to 2002 and "Minister of State for Municipal and Metropolitan Affairs, Environment and Water" from 2002 to 2003.)
In office March 8, 2001 – April 29, 2003
Premier	Bernard Landry
Preceded by	Paul Bégin
Succeeded by	Tom Mulcair
Minister of Social Solidarity
In office December 15, 1998 – March 8, 2001
Premier	Lucien Bouchard
Preceded by	Louise Harel
Succeeded by	Jean Rochon
Parliamentary constituencies
Member of the National Assembly of Quebec
In office August 14, 2006 – November 15, 2007
Preceded by	Nicole Léger
Succeeded by	Nicole Léger
Constituency	Pointe-aux-Trembles
In office September 25, 1989 – August 17, 2004
Preceded by	Jacques Rochefort
Succeeded by	Nicolas Girard
Constituency	Gouin

Personal details
- Born: April 14, 1966 (age 60) Montreal, Quebec, Canada
- Party: Parti Québécois
- Education: Collège Jean-de-Brébeuf; Université de Montréal; Harvard Kennedy School
- Profession: Politician

André Boisclair (French pronunciation: [ɑ̃dʁe bwaklɛʁ]; born April 14, 1966) is a Canadian former politician in Quebec, Canada. He was the leader of the Parti Québécois, a social democratic and sovereigntist party in Quebec.

Between January 1996 and March 2003, Boisclair served as Citizenship and Immigration Minister and Social Solidarity Minister under former Premier of Quebec Lucien Bouchard and as Environment Minister under former Premier Bernard Landry. He won the Parti Québécois leadership election on November 15, 2005.

After the worst defeat of his Party since 1970 in the 2007 Quebec general election, Boisclair announced he was stepping down as leader of the PQ on May 8, 2007. François Gendron was named interim leader.

On June 19, 2022, Boisclair pled guilty to two counts of sexual assault in separate episodes involving two young men. On July 18, 2022, the Quebec Court accepted a joint sentence recommendation from the Crown prosecutor and defence counsel, and imposed a sentence of imprisonment for two years less a day.

== Early life ==
Boisclair was born in Montreal, Quebec. He grew up in the affluent francophone Montreal neighbourhood of Outremont. While attending Collège Jean-de-Brébeuf, a private CEGEP, he became the president of the Federation of Quebec College Students (in French, FECQ). After graduation he attended Université de Montréal, but dropped out after two years.

== Political scene 1989–2003 ==
He joined the Parti Québécois in 1984, and in the 1989 general election he was elected to represent the Montreal-area riding of Gouin as a PQ candidate. At 23 years old, he became the youngest member ever elected to the Quebec National Assembly, a record he held until Simon-Pierre Diamond was elected in 2007. He also quickly garnered a reputation as a party animal in Quebec City's night-life scene.

He served as a cabinet minister from 1996 to 2003, under Parti Québécois (PQ) Premiers Lucien Bouchard and Bernard Landry, holding a variety of high-profile portfolios. During his time in office, Boisclair and his chief of staff, Luc Doray, became the center of a drug and embezzlement scandal. After a routine audit, officials discovered that Doray submitted over $30,000 in false expense reports and authorities later discovered that Doray had used the money to feed his cocaine habit.

Doray pleaded guilty to defrauding the government and during court testimony it was learned that Boisclair authorized some of the expenses. The ensuing investigation cleared Boisclair of any wrongdoing – he was never accused nor charged with any crime. However, in 2005, Boisclair admitted to personally using cocaine between 1996 and 2003 while serving as a member of the Quebec legislature.

Boisclair continued to serve as a Member of the National Assembly until he resigned in August 2004 to attend Harvard Kennedy School at Harvard University. At the time of his resignation, Boisclair held the position of opposition parliamentary (house) leader. Boisclair completed the Master's in Public Administration program at Harvard Kennedy School, a program that does not require students to hold a previous university degree. While at Harvard, Boisclair attended lectures by Michael Ignatieff and kept a blog recording his experience.

== Party leadership ==
After Bernard Landry resigned in June 2005, Boisclair entered the race to succeed Landry as the PQ's leader. Elected as the sixth leader of the Parti Québécois on November 15, 2005, Boisclair earned 53.8% of the party membership vote as compared to his closest rival, Pauline Marois, who garnered 30.6%. For the first time, the PQ allowed telephone voting, resulting in the participation of over 76% of the party membership. Polls taken at the time of his leadership victory in November 2005 suggested that Boisclair's Parti Québécois would win a landslide victory over the incumbent Liberal Party of Jean Charest.

Boisclair was the first openly gay politician in Canada to win the leadership of a party with legislative representation. (Previous openly gay Canadian political party leaders included Chris Lea of the Green Party of Canada and Allison Brewer of the New Brunswick New Democratic Party.)

After his election as party leader, Boisclair delivered a speech promising a sovereignty referendum within two years of a PQ victory in the next Quebec general election. During a joint press conference with Bloc Québécois leader Gilles Duceppe in Montreal on November 20, 2005, Boisclair decried Canada's Clarity Act as unacceptable. He stated that if elected Premier, he would ignore the ruling of the Supreme Court of Canada on referendum question clarity.

Upon taking the reins of the PQ, Boisclair's actions quickly created political controversy within his own party. After a questionable appearance in a comedy sketch featuring a homosexual depiction of Stephen Harper and George W. Bush, and an attempt to distance the PQ from its traditional union base, a push to oust Boisclair developed. Purportedly led by Boisclair's predecessor, Bernard Landry (which he denied), the plan failed and no real threat to Boisclair's leadership emerged. Pundits speculated that the proximity of the Quebec general election contributed to the putsch's failure.

On August 14, 2006, Boisclair was elected to the provincial legislative assembly in a by-election for the Montreal-area riding of Pointe-aux-Trembles. He was re-elected in the general election of March 26, 2007.

== 2007 election ==
In February 2007, Boisclair promised a dream team of high-profile candidates for the anticipated 2007 general election. Comparing his slate to the l'équipe du tonnerre (the thunder team) of former premier and Quiet revolution architect Jean Lesage, Boisclair announced that actor Pierre Curzi, former cabinet member Linda Goupil, TV journalist Bernard Drainville, academic Guy Lachapelle, union leader Marc Laviolette, and former Bloc Québécois MPs Richard Marceau and Yvan Loubier composed this team. On February 21, 2007, the Lieutenant-Governor of Quebec, Lise Thibault, dissolved parliament and called a general election for March 26, 2007.

Boisclair launched his campaign using the slogan "Reconstruisons notre Québec" (Let's rebuild our Quebec). At the beginning of the campaign, Boisclair's Parti Québécois stood five percentage points behind the Quebec Liberals.

Boisclair stated throughout his campaign that education would remain a key priority in the PQ's election strategy and that he would organize a new referendum on sovereignty as soon as possible. He also supported new measures targeting home ownership for young families.

During the election campaign, controversy arose when radio talk show host Louis Champagne made homophobic remarks while interviewing Parti Québécois candidate Alexandre Cloutier, asking him if the fact that his party was led by a gay man — and was running an openly gay candidate, Sylvain Gaudreault, in the neighbouring riding to Cloutier's — meant that voters would believe the Parti Québécois was "a club of fags". Days later, the radio station's corporate owner, the Corus Group, suspended Champagne.

Most observers ruled the 2007 leaders' debate a draw. Critics felt that Boisclair appeared the most aggressive, repeatedly asking the Action démocratique du Québec's (ADQ) Mario Dumont to state the financial model of his political platform.

Election night produced a major disappointment for the Parti Québécois. The party polled its smallest share of the popular vote since 1973 and the PQ came third in seat numbers in the National Assembly - losing Official Opposition status. The 2007 election left Quebec with its first minority government since 1878. Although Boisclair's future as the leader of Parti Québécois appeared uncertain, he claimed on the day after the election that he had no plans of stepping down (however, he resigned six weeks later).

Apart from the Champagne incident, the election campaign was not marked by any other open expressions of homophobia. However, at least one prominent political journalist in Quebec, The Gazette's Don Macpherson, has asserted that some other criticism of Boisclair — particularly a persistent notion among some voters that he was too cosmopolitan and "Montréalais" — may in fact have been code for lingering voter discomfort with the idea of electing an openly gay premier.

== Resignation as PQ Leader ==
André Boisclair announced his resignation as Parti Québécois leader on May 8, 2007, the same day Quebec's National Assembly resumed sitting after the 2007 general election. The announcement came as a shock to many Parti Québécois caucus members, some of whom expressed "sadness" at the decision.

Boisclair's leadership was questioned immediately after the election and petitions for a motion of confidence within the party came far and wide from regional PQ presidents and major sovereigntist groups.

Boisclair's resignation followed a dispute with Gilles Duceppe, leader of the Bloc Québécois, the sovereigntist party on the federal scene. In an interview with Radio-Canada, Boisclair had confirmed rumours that Duceppe had been scheming for his post. Duceppe denied these rumours but many political observers still believed Boisclair had gone too far in this denunciation.

Boisclair remained the MNA for Pointe-aux-Trembles, but on October 15, 2007, he announced he was resigning from his seat and quitting politics on November 15, 2007. He also accused leader Bernard Landry of undermining his support as party head by referring to the PQ's loss of public support under Boisclair's leadership, and for hinting he wanted to return to the party's leadership himself.

== Post-political life ==
Boisclair was hired by Questerre, a Calgary-based energy company, in 2011 as a consultant due to his sociopolitical knowledge of Quebec. In September 2012, Boisclair criticized the newly elected PQ government's position on the shale (more commonly known as fracking) industry in Quebec.

In November 2012, he was named as the new provincial delegate-general in New York City. During his time in this office, he was accused of organizing orgies and consuming drugs with young men inside the official residence of the delegation. An official complaint was made and he was sacked "at his request" on September 27, 2013.

In 2018, Boisclair pled guilty to drunk driving, refusing a sobriety test and to obstruction of justice. He was fined $2,000 and forbidden to drive for a year.

He was the president and CEO for the Urban development institute of Québec (UDI) - a non-profit organization focused on Quebec's commercial real estate industry from June 2016 until he resigned amidst allegations of sexual assaults.

== Sexual assault convictions ==
On May 28, 2020, Boisclair was charged with two counts of sexual assault on an unidentified victim: one charge for committing a sexual assault while carrying, using or threatening to use a weapon, and one charge for being party to a sexual assault with another person. The events are alleged to have occurred in 2014. On June 20, 2022, Boisclair pleaded guilty to the charge of being party to a sexual assault, and to a charge of sexual assault in respect of another victim; the charge of armed sexual assault against the first victim was dropped. The Crown prosecutor and the defence counsel made a joint sentencing submission of two years less a day of imprisonment. On July 18, 2022, the Quebec Court accepted the recommendation and imposed a sentence of two years less a day.

On November 15, 2022, in Montreal, his application for early release was denied on his first parole hearing. In its decision, the province's parole board explained that Boisclair had shown an "arrogant attitude" towards correctional officers and had refused to participate in group therapy for sexual delinquency because of concerns that his words would be leaked to the media. Therefore, the parole board said that Boisclair had not rehabilitated himself and that he was still dangerous. "Considering all the elements in the file, the commission considers that the risk of recidivism that you present is currently unacceptable and that the process must continue within the security context of incarceration," the commission wrote in a summary made public.

On December 2, 2022, his request for parole was again denied.

On March 17, 2023, his parole was granted.

In June 2024, his first victim sued him for $270,000 for the psychological consequences sustained from the armed sexual assault.

== See also ==
- 2005 Parti Québécois leadership election
- Quebec sovereignty movement
- Politics of Quebec
- List of leaders of the Official Opposition (Quebec)
- List of third party leaders of Quebec

== Electoral record ==
2007 Quebec general election: Pointe-aux-Trembles
Party	Candidate	Votes	%	±%
Parti Québécois	André Boisclair	13,784	47.30	−2.89
Action démocratique	Martin-Karl Bourbonnais	7,708	26.45	+12.20
Liberal	Daniel Fournier	5,316	18.24	−14.94
Green	Xavier Daxhelet	1,257	4.31	+2.70
Québec solidaire	Dominique Ritchot	763	2.62	
Bloc Pot	Etienne Mallette	154	0.53	
Christian Democracy	Julien Ferron	116	0.40	−0.08
Marxist–Leninist	Geneviève Royer	41	0.14	−0.14
Total valid votes		29,139	98.69	
Rejected and declined votes		388	1.31	
Turnout		29,527	72.92	−0.62
Electors on the lists		40,495		
Source: Official Results, Le Directeur général des élections du Québec.

Quebec provincial by-election, August 14, 2006: Pointe-aux-Trembles
Party	Candidate	Votes	%	±%
Parti Québécois	André Boisclair	9,077	70.95	+20.76
Green	Xavier Daxhelet	1,514	11.83	+10.22
Québec solidaire	Dominique Ritchot	1,073	8.39	
Independent	Benoît Bergeron	609	4.76	
Independent	Jocelyne Leduc	231	1.81	
Independent	Jean-Marc Boyer	124	0.97	
Bloc Pot	Benjamin Kasapoglu	113	0.88	
Independent	Régent Millette	52	0.41	
Total valid votes		12,793	100.00	
Rejected and declined votes		315		
Turnout		13,108	32.35	−39.95
Electors on the lists		40,516		

2003 Quebec general election
Party	Candidate	Votes	%	±%
Parti Québécois	André Boisclair	15,890	53.34	+0.66
Liberal	William Aguilar	8,996	30.20	-2.42
Action démocratique	Stéphane Deschênes	2,456	8.24	-2.48
UFP	Colette Provost	1,397	4.69	-
Green	Pierrette Chevalier	584	1.96	-
Bloc Pot	Hugô St-Onge	465	1.56	-

1998 Quebec general election: Gouin
Party	Candidate	Votes	%
Parti Québécois	André Boisclair (incumbent)	16,097	52.68
Liberal	Michelle Daines	10,273	33.62
Action démocratique	Patricia St-Jacques	3,276	10.72
Socialist Democracy	Geneviève Ricard	624	2.04
Marxist–Leninist	Claude Brunelle	149	0.49
Communist	Athanasios Ntouskas	75	0.25
Communist League	Annette Kouri	61	0.20
Total valid votes		30,555	
Rejected and declined votes		450	
Turnout		31,005	74.40
Electors on the lists		41,676	
Source: Official Results, Le Directeur général des élections du Québec.

1994 Quebec general election: Gouin
Party	Candidate	Votes	%	±%
Parti Québécois	André Boisclair	17,305	56.42	+5.39
Liberal	Athena Efraim	10,944	35.68	-4.80
New Democratic	Hans Marotte	1,428	4.66	+2.33
Independent	Sylviane Morin	458	1.49	–
Natural Law	Alain-Édouard Lord	263	0.86	–
Marxist–Leninist	Serge Lachapelle	142	0.46	+0.16
Republic of Canada	Pierre Aylwin	132	0.43	–

1989 Quebec general election: Gouin
Party	Candidate	Votes	%	±%
Parti Québécois	André Boisclair	10,568	51.03	+2.57
Liberal	Normand Hamel	8,383	40.48	-4.86
Green	Sylvain Auclair	929	4.49	–
New Democratic	Paul Montpetit	482	2.33	-0.54
Workers	Gilles Bourque	186	0.90	–
Marxist–Leninist	Michelle Dufort	63	0.30	–
Communist	Denis Gervais	52	0.25	–
Socialist Movement	Yvan Comeau	46	0.22	–

Political offices
Preceded by Pierre Paradis (Liberal)	Official Opposition House Leader; 2003–2004	Succeeded by Diane Lemieux (PQ)
Preceded by Louise Harel (PQ); Interim	Leader of the Opposition (Quebec); 2006-2007	Succeeded by Mario Dumont (ADQ)
Preceded by Louise Harel; Interim	Leader of the Parti Québécois; 2005-2007	Succeeded by François Gendron; Interim
