= Nicole Léger =

Canadian politician

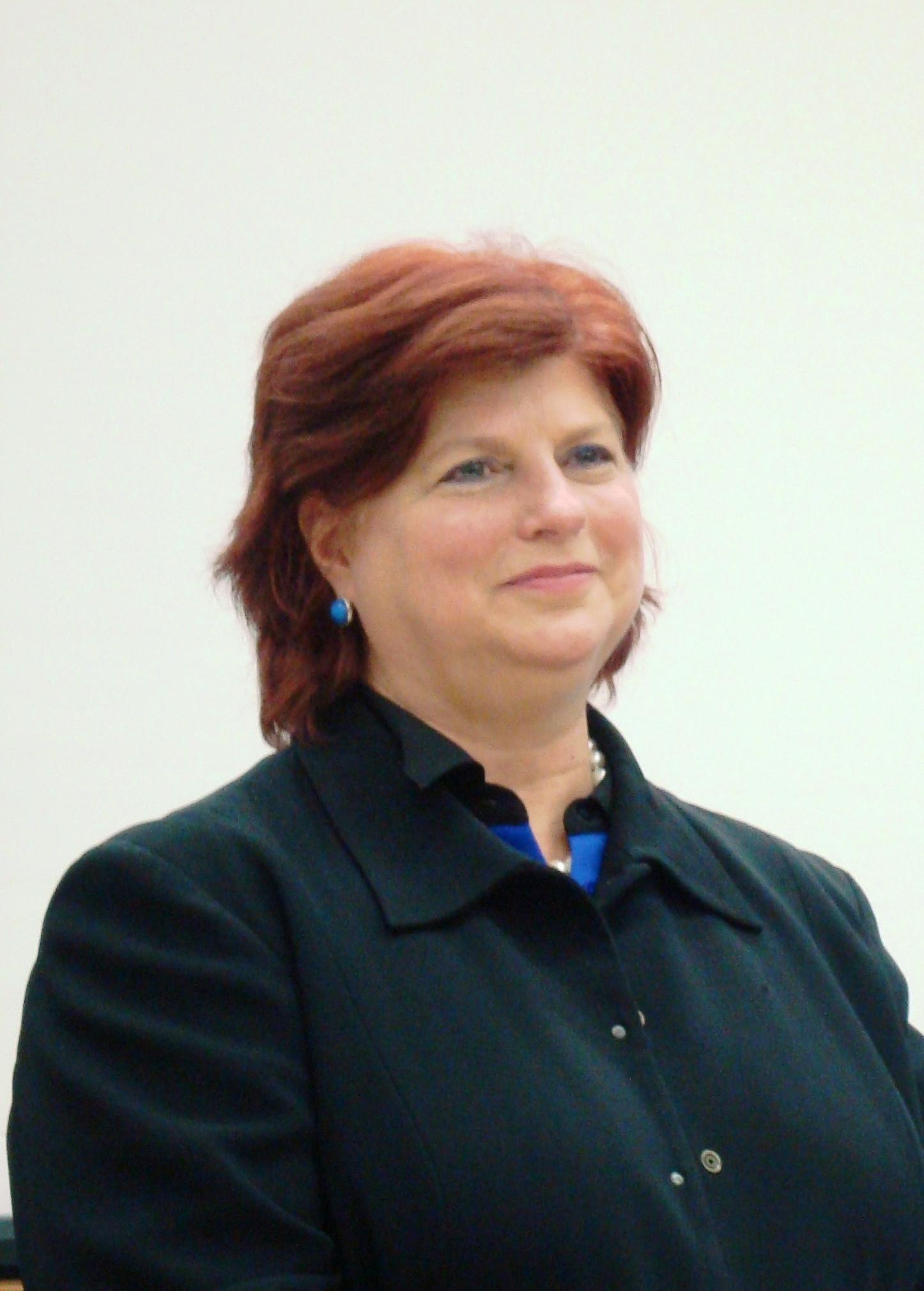
- Nicole Léger, December 2014

Member of the National Assembly of Quebec for Pointe-aux-Trembles
- In office May 12, 2008 – October 28, 2018
- Preceded by: André Boisclair
- Succeeded by: Chantal Rouleau
- In office December 9, 1996 – June 1, 2006
- Preceded by: Michel Bourdon
- Succeeded by: André Boisclair

Personal details
- Born: March 12, 1955 (age 71) Montreal, Quebec, Canada
- Party: Parti Québécois

Nicole Léger (born March 12, 1955) is a former Canadian politician and the former Member of the National Assembly of Quebec (MNA) for the riding of Pointe-aux-Trembles from 1996 to 2006 and elected back as member of the Parti Québécois in a by-election on May 12, 2008, serving until the 2018 Quebec provincial election.

== Background ==
She was born on March 12, 1955, in Montreal, Quebec, and is the daughter of former Parti Québécois MNA Marcel Léger and the sister of Jean-Marc Léger, president of Léger Marketing. She made career in education and served in various executive positions in the Parti Québécois (PQ) from 1970 to 1996.

== Member of the National Assembly ==
Following the death of MNA Michel Bourdon, Léger ran as a PQ candidate to fill his seat of Pointe-aux-Trembles. She easily won the by-election with 47% of the vote and was re-elected in the 1998 election.

== Cabinet Member ==
Léger was appointed to the Cabinet in 1998 and served as Minister responsible for Family Services until 2001 and as Minister responsible for the War against Poverty from 2001 to 2003.

== Retirement from politics ==
She won re-election in the 2003 election, but her party was defeated by Jean Charest's Liberals.

In the Parti Québécois leadership election of 2005 she was a staunch supporter of Pauline Marois over André Boisclair.

In the aftermath of Boisclair's victory as leader, both Marois and Léger vacated their seats and left politics. André Boisclair won a by-election and succeeded Nicole Léger as the MNA for Pointe-aux-Trembles.

== Political comeback ==
Even though Boisclair won re-election to the legislature in the 2007 election, the PQ had one of the worst showings in history. Boisclair resigned as party leader and relinquished his seat.

Léger won the seat back on May 12, 2008: she received 55% of the vote in a by-election and finished ahead of candidates Mélissa Dumais of the Liberal Party and Diane Bellemare of the ADQ.

She did not seek re-election in the 2018 Quebec provincial election.

== Electoral record (partial) ==
2014 Quebec general election
Party	Candidate	Votes	%	±%
Parti Québécois	Nicole Léger	12,021	43.22	-7.04
Coalition Avenir Québec	Mathieu Binette	6,692	24.06	-0.06
Liberal	Claude Blais	6,229	22.40	+6.96
Québec solidaire	Natacha Larocque	2,165	7.78	+1.87
Green	David Cox	332	1.19	–
Option nationale	Camille Goyette-Gingras	234	0.84	-1.35
Marxist–Leninist	Geneviève Royer	82	0.29	+0.05
Équipe Autonomiste	Louis Chandonnet	56	0.20	–
Total valid votes		27,811	97.92	–
Total rejected ballots		591	2.08	–
Turnout		28,402	69%	-7.00
Electors on the lists		40,905	–	–

2012 Quebec general election
Party	Candidate	Votes	%	±%
Parti Québécois	Nicole Léger	15,406	50.26	-6.61
Coalition Avenir Québec	Guy Boutin	7,425	24.22	+13.00*
Liberal	Jessica Veronica Cialdella	4,732	15.44	-9.25
Québec solidaire	Natacha Larocque	1,811	5.91	+2.97
Option nationale	Guillaume Simard L'Heureux	672	2.19	–
Independent	Jean-Marcel Seck	425	1.39	–
Parti indépendantiste	Gérald Briand	109	0.36	-0.34
Marxist–Leninist	Geneviève Royer	73	0.24	-0.10
Total valid votes		30,653	98.64	–
Total rejected ballots		422	1.36	–
Turnout		31,075	76%	+19.34
Electors on the lists		40,691	–	–

2008 Quebec general election
Party	Candidate	Votes	%	±%
Parti Québécois	Nicole Léger	12,851	56.87	+0.88
Liberal	Gilbert Thibodeau	5,580	24.69	+2.85
Action démocratique	Pierre Trudelle	2,535	11.22	-2.54
Green	Xavier Daxhelet	733	3.24	-1.59
Québec solidaire	Marie-Josèphe Pigeon	664	2.94	+1.29
Independent	Gérald Briand	159	0.70	+0.13
Marxist–Leninist	Geneviève Royer	77	0.34	–
Total valid votes		22,599	98.12	–
Total rejected ballots		434	1.88	–
Turnout		23,033	56.66	+22.53
Electors on the lists		40,648	–	–

Quebec provincial by-election, May 12, 2008: Pointe-aux-Trembles
Party	Candidate	Votes	%	±%
Parti Québécois	Nicole Léger	7,657	55.99	+8.69
Liberal	Mélissa Dumais	2,987	21.84	+3.60
Action démocratique	Diane Bellemare	1,882	13.76	−12.69
Green	Xavier Daxhelet	661	4.83	+0.52
Québec solidaire	Marie Josèphe Pigeon	226	1.65	−0.97
Parti indépendantiste	Colette Provost	153	1.12	–
Independent	Gérald Briand	78	0.57	
Independent	Régent Millette	31	0.23	
Total valid votes		13,675	100.00	
Rejected and declined votes		146		
Turnout		13,821	34.13	−38.79
Electors on the lists		40,496		

2003 Quebec general election: Pointe-aux-Trembles
Party	Candidate	Votes	%	±%
Parti Québécois	Nicole Léger	14,261	50.19	-3.64
Liberal	Daniel Fournier	9,427	33.18	+2.43
Action démocratique	André Cordeau	4,050	14.25	+0.06
Green	Xavier Daxhelet	457	1.61	–
Christian Democracy	Julien Ferron	137	0.48	–
Marxist–Leninist	Geneviève Royer	80	0.28	–
Total valid votes		28,412	100.00	
Rejected and declined votes		487		
Turnout		28,899	72.30	
Electors on the lists		39,971		
Source: Official Results, Le Directeur général des élections du Québec.

1998 Quebec general election
Party	Candidate	Votes	%	±%
Parti Québécois	Nicole Léger	15,946	53.83	+6.80
Liberal	Richard La Charité	9,110	30.75	-3.49
Action démocratique	Daniel Croze	4,205	14.19	-3.05
Socialist Democracy	Hughes Tremblay	205	0.69	-0.09
Innovateur	Claude Laporte	158	0.53	-0.18

QC: Pointe-aux-Trembles by-election, December 9, 1996
Party	Candidate	Votes	%	±%
Parti Québécois	Nicole Léger	7,190	47.03	-6.74
Liberal	Bernard Lauzon	5,234	34.24	+0.75
Action démocratique	Jacques Hébert	2,635	17.24	+5.59
Socialist Democracy	Daniel Pharand	119	0.78	–
Innovateur	Claude Laporte	109	0.71	–
