= Quebec Liberal Party candidates in the 2007 Quebec provincial election =

Quebec provincial election candidates in the 2007

The Quebec Liberal Party fielded a full slate of 125 candidates in the 2007 Quebec provincial election, and elected forty-eight members to form a minority government after the election. Many of the party's candidates have their own biography pages; information about others may be found here.

== Candidates ==
=== Nicolet-Yamaska: Yves Baril ===
Yves Baril was born in Sainte-Perpétue de Nicolet. He is a poultry and cereal producer and was president of the Fédération des producteurs de volaille du Québec (Federation of Quebec Poultry Producers) from 2000 to 2007, when he resigned to run for public office. He publicly supported a 2001 Superior Court of Quebec decision that upheld the legality of market quotas in the poultry sector and later endorsed an April 2005 Supreme Court of Canada decision that upheld the provincial court's ruling. He outlined his organization's approach to biosecurity in late 2005, during the period of an avian flu outbreak in North America.

Baril won the Nicolet-Yamaska Liberal nomination over Denis Vallée in late 2006. For the 2007 campaign, he stood with Premier Jean Charest to present the Liberal Party's agriculture platform. He received 6,770 votes (25.72%), finishing third against Action démocratique du Québec candidate Éric Dorion. On 13 February 2008, he was named as a member of the Commission de protection du territoire agricole du Québec.

=== Pointe-aux-Trembles: Daniel Fournier ===
Daniel Fournier was born and raised in Montreal East. He campaigned against his community's amalgamation into the City of Montreal in 2001; describing himself as a "blue-collar worker, citizen, and volunteer," he argued that Montreal East's budget surplus would ultimately pay for services in the city's more affluent areas. In 2004, he was a prominent activist for the "Oui" side in a successful de-merger referendum.

Fournier was once a member of the Parti Québécois, although he says that he tore up his party membership in 2000 because the PQ had moved away from its origins as a labour party. He subsequently ran for the Liberal Party in two elections. He also planned to run in a 2008 by-election, but was not chosen as his party's candidate.

He is not to be confused with the Montreal businessperson Daniel Fournier, who has run for the House of Commons of Canada as a Conservative candidate.

Electoral record (since 2000)
Election	Division	Party	Votes	%	Place	Winner
2003 provincial	Pointe-aux-Trembles	Liberal	9,427	33.18	2/6	Nicole Léger, Parti Québécois
2007 provincial	Pointe-aux-Trembles	Liberal	5,316	18.24	3/8	André Boisclair, Parti Québécois

=== Richelieu: Gilles Salvas ===
Gilles Salvas was born in the Montérégie region of Quebec, where he has lived and worked for his entire life. He is a longtime municipal politician, having served as mayor of Saint-Robert since 1989. He is a federalist and supports a continued role for Quebec within Canada. In announcing his provincial candidacy in 2007, he accused past Parti Québécois (PQ) governments of having devolved provincial responsibilities to the municipalities without providing adequate funding. He endorsed Premier Jean Charest's health reforms and called for English-language training in francophone schools from the earliest grades. On election day, he finished third against PQ incumbent Sylvain Simard amid a provincial swing away from the Liberals.

Salvas was re-elected by a narrow margin in the 2009 municipal election. As of 2009, he is a member of the Centre local de développement (CLD) de Pierre-De Saurel.

Electoral record (since 2000)
Election	Division	Party	Votes	%	Place	Winner
2001 municipal	Mayor of Saint-Robert	n/a	accl.	n/a	1/1	himself
2005 municipal	Mayor of Saint-Robert	n/a	accl.	n/a	1/1	himself
2007 provincial	Richelieu	Liberal	7,275	24.24	3/6	Sylvain Simard, Parti Québécois
2009 municipal	Mayor of Saint-Robert	n/a	453	51.95	1/2	himself
