= Pointe-aux-Trembles (electoral district) =

Quebec electoral district
- Location in Montreal

Provincial electoral district
- Legislature: National Assembly of Quebec
MNA
Stéphane Paquet
Parti Québécois
- District created: 1988
- First contested: 1989
- Last contested: 2026

Demographics
- Population (2006): 53,485
- Electors (2014): 40,905
- Area (km²): 37.2
- Pop. density (per km²): 1,437.8
- Census division: Montreal (part)
- Census subdivision(s): Montreal (part), Montréal-Est

Pointe-aux-Trembles (French pronunciation: [pwɛ̃t o tʁɑ̃bl]) is a provincial electoral district in the Montreal region of Quebec, Canada, that elects members to the National Assembly of Quebec. The district is located at the east point of the Island of Montreal and comprises the city of Montréal-Est and the neighbourhood of Pointe-aux-Trembles in the borough of Rivière-des-Prairies–Pointe-aux-Trembles borough of Montreal.

It was created for the 1989 election from parts of Anjou, Bourget and LaFontaine electoral districts.

In the change from the 2001 to the 2011 electoral map, its territory was unchanged.

In the 1995 Quebec referendum it (under its current boundaries) voted 63% for Quebec to become independent.

== Members of the National Assembly ==
Legislature	Years	Member	Party
Riding created from Anjou, Bourget and LaFontaine
34th	1989–1994	Michel Bourdon	Parti Québécois
35th	1994–1996	Michel Bourdon	Parti Québécois
35th	1996–1998	Nicole Léger	Parti Québécois
36th	1998–2003	Nicole Léger	Parti Québécois
37th	2003–2006	Nicole Léger	Parti Québécois
37th	2006–2007	André Boisclair	Parti Québécois
38th	2007–2008	André Boisclair	Parti Québécois
38th	2008–2008	Nicole Léger	Parti Québécois
39th	2008–2012	Nicole Léger	Parti Québécois
40th	2012–2014	Nicole Léger	Parti Québécois
41st	2014–2018	Nicole Léger	Parti Québécois
42nd	2018–2022	Chantal Rouleau	Coalition Avenir Québec
43rd	2022–2026	Chantal Rouleau	Coalition Avenir Québec
44th	2026–Present	Stéphane Paquet	Parti Québécois

== Election results ==
2026 Quebec general election
** Preliminary results — Not yet official **
Party	Candidate	Votes	%	±%
Parti Québécois	Stéphane Paquet	9,882	38.08	
Coalition Avenir Québec	Chantal Rouleau	4,843	18.66	
Liberal	Naïma Marylene Indira Som	4,586	17.67	
Québec solidaire	Mégane Charron	3,299	12.71	
Conservative	Maxim Tremblay	3,020	11.64	
Parti nul	Maude Chapdelaine	238	0.92	
Marxist–Leninist	Geneviève Royer	45	0.17	
Équipe Autonomiste	Daniel Lasalle	39	0.15	
Total valid votes				
Total rejected ballots				
Turnout			65.60	
Electors on the lists			–	–
Source: Élections Québec

2022 Quebec general election
Party	Candidate	Votes	%	±%
Coalition Avenir Québec	Chantal Rouleau	12,156	45.88	+6.92
Parti Québécois	Jocelyn Desjardins	5,265	19.87	-12.33
Québec solidaire	Simon Tremblay-Pepin	4,084	15.41	+0.55
Liberal	Byanca Jeune	2,750	10.38	-2.18
Conservative	Yves Beaulieu	1,804	6.81	–
Green	Alex Di Pardo	268	1.01	–
Climat Québec	Marc Michaud	82	0.30	–
Marxist–Leninist	Geneviève Royer	53	0.20	
Équipe Autonomiste	Louis Chandonnet	33	0.10	
Total valid votes			–	
Total rejected ballots			–	
Turnout				
Electors on the lists			–	–

2018 Quebec general election
Party	Candidate	Votes	%	±%
Coalition Avenir Québec	Chantal Rouleau	10,579	38.96	+14.9
Parti Québécois	Jean-Martin Aussant	8,745	32.2	-11.02
Québec solidaire	Céline Pereira	4,036	14.86	+7.08
Liberal	Eric Ouellette	3,410	12.56	-9.84
Bloc Pot	Pierre Surette	218	0.8	
Équipe Autonomiste	Louis Chandonnet	89	0.33	+0.13
Marxist–Leninist	Geneviève Royer	79	0.29	+0
Total valid votes		27,156	97.87	
Total rejected ballots		592	2.13	
Turnout		27,748	67.43	
Eligible voters		41,148		
Coalition Avenir Québec gain from Parti Québécois		Swing		+12.96
Source(s) "Rapport des résultats officiels du scrutin". Élections Québec.

2014 Quebec general election
Party	Candidate	Votes	%	±%
Parti Québécois	Nicole Léger	12,021	43.22	-7.04
Coalition Avenir Québec	Mathieu Binette	6,692	24.06	-0.06
Liberal	Claude Blais	6,229	22.40	+6.96
Québec solidaire	Natacha Larocque	2,165	7.78	+1.87
Green	David Cox	332	1.19	–
Option nationale	Camille Goyette-Gingras	234	0.84	-1.35
Marxist–Leninist	Geneviève Royer	82	0.29	+0.05
Équipe Autonomiste	Louis Chandonnet	56	0.20	–
Total valid votes		27,811	97.92	–
Total rejected ballots		591	2.08	–
Turnout		28,402	69%	-7.00
Electors on the lists		40,905	–	–

2012 Quebec general election
Party	Candidate	Votes	%	±%
Parti Québécois	Nicole Léger	15,406	50.26	-6.61
Coalition Avenir Québec	Guy Boutin	7,425	24.22	+13.00*
Liberal	Jessica Veronica Cialdella	4,732	15.44	-9.25
Québec solidaire	Natacha Larocque	1,811	5.91	+2.97
Option nationale	Guillaume Simard L'Heureux	672	2.19	–
Independent	Jean-Marcel Seck	425	1.39	–
Parti indépendantiste	Gérald Briand	109	0.36	-0.34
Marxist–Leninist	Geneviève Royer	73	0.24	-0.10
Total valid votes		30,653	98.64	–
Total rejected ballots		422	1.36	–
Turnout		31,075	76%	+19.34
Electors on the lists		40,691	–	–

- Result compared to Action Démocratique

2008 Quebec general election
Party	Candidate	Votes	%	±%
Parti Québécois	Nicole Léger	12,851	56.87	+0.88
Liberal	Gilbert Thibodeau	5,580	24.69	+2.85
Action démocratique	Pierre Trudelle	2,535	11.22	-2.54
Green	Xavier Daxhelet	733	3.24	-1.59
Québec solidaire	Marie-Josèphe Pigeon	664	2.94	+1.29
Independent	Gérald Briand	159	0.70	+0.13
Marxist–Leninist	Geneviève Royer	77	0.34	–
Total valid votes		22,599	98.12	–
Total rejected ballots		434	1.88	–
Turnout		23,033	56.66	+22.53
Electors on the lists		40,648	–	–

Quebec provincial by-election, May 12, 2008
Party	Candidate	Votes	%	±%
Parti Québécois	Nicole Léger	7,657	55.99	+8.69
Liberal	Mélissa Dumais	2,987	21.84	+3.60
Action démocratique	Diane Bellemare	1,882	13.76	−12.69
Green	Xavier Daxhelet	661	4.83	+0.52
Québec solidaire	Marie Josèphe Pigeon	226	1.65	−0.97
Parti indépendantiste	Colette Provost	153	1.12	–
Independent	Gérald Briand	78	0.57	
Independent	Régent Millette	31	0.23	
Total valid votes		13,675	100.00	
Rejected and declined votes		146		
Turnout		13,821	34.13	−38.79
Electors on the lists		40,496		

2007 Quebec general election
Party	Candidate	Votes	%	±%
Parti Québécois	André Boisclair	13,784	47.30	−2.89
Action démocratique	Martin-Karl Bourbonnais	7,708	26.45	+12.20
Liberal	Daniel Fournier	5,316	18.24	−14.94
Green	Xavier Daxhelet	1,257	4.31	+2.70
Québec solidaire	Dominique Ritchot	763	2.62	
Bloc Pot	Etienne Mallette	154	0.53	
Christian Democracy	Julien Ferron	116	0.40	−0.08
Marxist–Leninist	Geneviève Royer	41	0.14	−0.14
Total valid votes		29,139	98.69	
Rejected and declined votes		388	1.31	
Turnout		29,527	72.92	−0.62
Electors on the lists		40,495		
Source: Official Results, Le Directeur général des élections du Québec.

Quebec provincial by-election, August 14, 2006
Party	Candidate	Votes	%	±%
Parti Québécois	André Boisclair	9,077	70.95	+20.76
Green	Xavier Daxhelet	1,514	11.83	+10.22
Québec solidaire	Dominique Ritchot	1,073	8.39	
Independent	Benoît Bergeron	609	4.76	
Independent	Jocelyne Leduc	231	1.81	
Independent	Jean-Marc Boyer	124	0.97	
Bloc Pot	Benjamin Kasapoglu	113	0.88	
Independent	Régent Millette	52	0.41	
Total valid votes		12,793	100.00	
Rejected and declined votes		315		
Turnout		13,108	32.35	−39.95
Electors on the lists		40,516		

2003 Quebec general election
Party	Candidate	Votes	%	±%
Parti Québécois	Nicole Léger	14,261	50.19	-3.64
Liberal	Daniel Fournier	9,427	33.18	+2.43
Action démocratique	André Cordeau	4,050	14.25	+0.06
Green	Xavier Daxhelet	457	1.61	–
Christian Democracy	Julien Ferron	137	0.48	–
Marxist–Leninist	Geneviève Royer	80	0.28	–
Total valid votes		28,412	100.00	
Rejected and declined votes		487		
Turnout		28,899	72.30	
Electors on the lists		39,971		
Source: Official Results, Le Directeur général des élections du Québec.

1998 Quebec general election
Party	Candidate	Votes	%	±%
Parti Québécois	Nicole Léger	15,946	53.83	+6.80
Liberal	Richard La Charité	9,110	30.75	-3.49
Action démocratique	Daniel Croze	4,205	14.19	-3.05
Socialist Democracy	Hughes Tremblay	205	0.69	-0.09
Innovateur	Claude Laporte	158	0.53	-0.18

Quebec provincial by-election, December 9, 1996
Party	Candidate	Votes	%	±%
Parti Québécois	Nicole Léger	7,190	47.03	-6.74
Liberal	Bernard Lauzon	5,234	34.24	+0.75
Action démocratique	Jacques Hébert	2,635	17.24	+5.59
Socialist Democracy	Daniel Pharand	119	0.78	–
Innovateur	Claude Laporte	109	0.71	–

1995 Quebec referendum
Side	Votes	%
Oui	21,425	60.88
Non	13,768	39.12

1994 Quebec general election
Party	Candidate	Votes	%	±%
Parti Québécois	Michel Bourdon	15,999	53.77	+3.28
Liberal	José G. Simon	9,965	33.49	-10.46
Action démocratique	Martin Ouellet	3,466	11.65	–
Natural Law	André Gaudet	324	1.09	–

1992 Charlottetown Accord referendum
Side	Votes	%
Non	20,854	67.24
Oui	10,159	32.76

1989 Quebec general election
Party	Candidate	Votes	%
Parti Québécois	Michel Bourdon	13,725	50.49
Liberal	Jean Tondreau	11,968	43.95
Workers	Gérald Varichon	659	2.42
Progressive Conservative	André Ethier	549	2.02
United Social Credit	Mario Gosselin	327	1.20

== See also ==
- List of Quebec provincial electoral districts
- Canadian provincial electoral districts
