= Michel Bourdon =

Canadian politician

Michel Bourdon (September 19, 1943 – November 29, 2004) was a union leader, journalist, and politician in Quebec, Canada. During the 1970s, he played a major role in exposing corrupt practices in Quebec's construction industry. He later served in the National Assembly of Quebec from 1989 to 1996 as a member of the Parti Québécois (PQ).

Bourdon was married for a time to Louise Harel, herself a prominent Quebec politician. The pair had an amiable divorce and remained political allies in the years that followed. Their daughter, Catherine Harel-Bourdon, became chair of the Commission scolaire de Montréal in 2013.

== Early life and career ==
Bourdon was born in Montreal and began working as a journalist with the Nouveau Journal at age sixteen. He later edited the Quartier Libre while attending the Université de Montréal.

He joined Radio-Canada in 1966 as a French-language television news reporter and subsequently became president of the Syndicat général du cinéma et de la télévision. In 1968, he was the primary spokesperson for a group of Radio-Canada journalists who went on strike to support a television reporter suspended for allegedly showing "anti-police bias" in reporting on the 1968 St-Jean-Baptiste Day riots. Bourdon and four other journalists later were given five-day suspensions for refusing to work during Radio-Canada's coverage of the 1968 Canadian federal election, which took place the day after the riots.

Bourdon was fired from Radio-Canada during the 1970 FLQ Crisis for "insubordination," after publicly accusing the station of censorship in its coverage of the event.

== Union activist ==
As vice-president of the Montreal council of the Confédération des syndicats nationaux (CSN) in 1970, Bourdon endorsed Quebec independence and accused Canadian prime minister Pierre Trudeau of having imposed the War Measures Act on Quebec during the FLQ Crisis to weaken the constitutional Parti Québécois rather than the radical Front de libération du Québec (FLQ) paramilitary group. He also accused Trudeau of having put Quebec under military occupation with "means of terror incomparably superior to those of the FLQ." The following year, Bourdon took part in a ten-member citizens' commission that reviewed the Canadian government's response to the crisis.

Bourdon was elected as leader of the CSN-affiliated Fédération nationale des syndicats du bâtiment et du bois in the early 1970s. Shortly thereafter, he released a dossier noir report exposing violence and corruption in Quebec's construction industry, then dominated by the rival Fédération des travailleurs du Québec (FTQ). This report received extensive coverage and prompted the provincial government to launch the Cliche Commission, which brought about wide-ranging changes. In 2004, the Montreal Gazette credited Bourdon with having "almost single-handedly" exposed the issue of corruption in the construction sector. Bourdon and his family were threatened by the mafia after the dossier noir's release and received police protection.

Bourdon testified before the Cliche Commission in 1974, accusing the FTQ of running a "private army" that used intimidation tactics against CSN members on construction sites; he also criticized Quebec labour minister Jean Cournoyer for allegedly favouring the FTQ in negotiations. The commission's report ultimately found that corruption in the sector was almost entirely limited to the FTQ and "hardly touched" the CSN.

In 1976, Bourdon led the CSN's construction workers in refusing to join a FTQ strike. He indicated that this decision resulted from the CSN's exclusion from recent labour-management negotiations.

Bourdon resigned as president of the CSN's construction wing in 1979 to seek the PQ's nomination for a provincial by-election in Maisonneuve. He lost the nomination to Jacques Desmarais. Several members of the party's riding executive later resigned, charging interference from Quebec premier and PQ leader René Lévesque.

== PQ activist and legislator ==
Bourdon was on the PQ's radical left wing in the party's early years. He endorsed the CSN's 1971 decision to support the PQ, but added, "This doesn't mean that we won't criticize [the party] when it takes a position contrary to the interests of workers." In 1981, he helped lead the PQ's annual convention in affirming its support for full independence and rejecting René Lévesque's policy of sovereignty-association. An exasperated Lévesque once described Bourdon as "a professional dissident and a manipulator from God knows where."

In 1977, Bourdon strongly defended the PQ's Charter of the French Language against concerns from other party members that it would discriminate against anglophone immigrants from other parts of Canada. Bourdon's position was that the charter was not discriminatory.

After the fall of the first PQ government in 1985, Bourdon considered running for the House of Commons of Canada as a candidate of the New Democratic Party. At the time, he was quoted as saying, "independence is not on the agenda any more." He ultimately decided not to run.

In opposition

Bourdon was elected to the National Assembly of Quebec for the newly created east-end Montreal division of Pointe-aux-Trembles in the 1989 provincial election. He highlighted environmental concerns during the campaign, saying that petrochemical companies should pay the costs of removing toxic chemicals from the air and soil of east-end Montreal. The Liberal Party was returned to a second consecutive majority government in this election under Robert Bourassa's leadership, and Bourdon served for the next four years as a member of the official opposition. At different times, he was his party's critic for labour, justice, and issues of public integrity.

In December 1989, Bourdon accused the Bourassa government of unfair patronage tactics in awarding a contract for the expansion of a North Shore hospital to a firm with Liberal ties, even though the firm had not initially been in the running. The government denied the charge. The following summer, Bourdon announced the PQ's support for a government task force report on tightening the rules for government contracts.

Bourdon strongly criticized the PQ leadership at the party's 1991 convention, after party whip Jacques Brassard introduced a successful motion in support of the Gulf War. Bourdon charged that Brassard had introduced the motion due to pressure from the American government and speculated that most delegates who supported it were fearful of offending American interests at a time when the PQ had reasonable aspirations of returning to power. Bourdon himself strongly opposed the war, saying, "I don't want Quebecers coming home dead in plastic bags." At the same convention, he convinced delegates to endorse, for the first time, the right of self-determination for the Palestinian people.

Bourdon and Equality Party leader Robert Libman formed an improbable alliance in early 1992 to support the rights of Montreal Island merchants, who had seen property tax increases of up to one hundred per cent due to the provincial government's restructuring of municipal tax codes.

As a legislator, Bourdon took an interest in issues of concern to anglophone Quebecers and Quebecers from cultural communities. He criticized the Bourassa government's 1991 announcement of a ten per cent hiring target for anglophones in the civil service, saying that anglophones were already welcome to apply for positions and did not face discrimination. He argued that the government should instead determine why anglophones were not already applying in larger numbers. Later in the same year, Bourdon served on a PQ task force on the rights of Quebec anglophones; in this capacity, he recommended easing Quebec's restrictive sign laws to permit a greater use of English-language signs at commercial establishments. He was quoted as saying, "We have to head toward a relaxing of the legislation on commercial signs. Even though I don't think the law is breaching a fundamental right, it's very clear it's perceived as such by the Quebec anglophone community. It's an abscess to them."

Bourdon offered his support to a group of hunger-striking refugee claimants from Latin America in early 1990. He subsequently called for more immigration to Montreal, and in 1993 he sought an independent investigation into the death of Marcellus François, a black Montrealer who had been shot by Montreal Urban Community police officers two years earlier. He later criticized a proposal from the upstart Action démocratique du Québec (ADQ) party to financially penalize immigrants who failed to learn French, describing the proposal as "stupid and contrary to the rights of individuals" as well as "manifestly illegal."

In September 1993, Bourdon supported a demonstration calling on governments to stop what was described as the genocide of Bosnian Muslims in Bosnia and Hercegovina.

Bourdon supported Roger Laporte's candidacy for the Bloc Québécois (BQ) nomination in Mercier in the buildup to the 1993 Canadian federal election and criticized party rules that granted voting rights to delegates from outside the riding. PQ leader Jacques Parizeau publicly rebuked Bourdon for the latter statement, saying that it was inappropriate for PQ members to question the by-laws of an allied federal party. (Laporte lost the nomination to Francine Lalonde.)

Several of Bourdon's activities made him unpopular with senior PQ officials, and he faced a serious nomination challenge from Nicole Léger in late 1993. Bourdon ultimately won the challenge by eight votes, after several of Léger's potential supporters were found to have been improperly recruited to the party.

Government backbencher

Bourdon was re-elected in the 1994 Quebec provincial election, in which the PQ won a majority government under Parizeau's leadership. For the next two years, he served as a government backbencher. His role in public life was significantly reduced, however, as his health was in a serious state of decline. He resigned from the legislature in June 1996 due to the effects of multiple sclerosis, which he had been diagnosed with three years earlier. In his resignation speech, he said that he regretted having to leave before the PQ government passed its promised pay equity legislation.

After 1995 Quebec referendum on sovereignty, in which the Quebec sovereigntist option was narrowly defeated, Bourdon was quoted as saying, "I see it as perfectly normal that (for English-speaking Quebecers) it's better to be majority in Canada than minority in Quebec. If I were an anglophone, I'd be a federalist."

== Death ==
Bourdon died in 2004 in Saint-Charles-Borromée Hospital.

== Electoral record ==
1994 Quebec general election: Pointe-aux-Trembles
Party	Candidate	Votes	%	±%
Parti Québécois	Michel Bourdon (incumbent)	15,999	53.77	
Liberal	José G. Simon	9,965	33.49	
Action démocratique	Martin Ouellet	3,466	11.65	
Natural Law	André Gaudet	324	1.09	
Total valid votes		29,754	100.00	
Rejected and declined votes		700		
Turnout		30,454	82.46	
Electors on the lists		36,932		
Source: Official Results, Le Directeur général des élections du Québec.

1989 Quebec general election: Pointe-aux-Trembles
Party	Candidate	Votes	%	±%
Parti Québécois	Michel Bourdon	13,725	50.41	
Liberal	Jean Tondreau	11,968	43.95	
Workers	Gérald Varichon	659	2.42	
Progressive Conservative	André Ethier	549	2.02	
United Social Credit	Mario Gosselin	327	1.20	
Total valid votes		27,228	100.00	
Rejected and declined votes		926		
Turnout		28,154	74.63	
Electors on the lists		37,724		
Source: Official Results, Le Directeur général des élections du Québec.
