= Stéphane Paquet =

Canadian politician

Stéphane Paquet MNA

Member of the National Assembly for Pointe-aux-Trembles
- Incumbent
- Assumed office October 5, 2026
- Preceded by: Chantal Rouleau

Personal details
- Party: Parti Québécois

Stéphane Paquet is a Canadian politician who is a candidate for the National Assembly of Quebec for Pointe-aux-Trembles in the 2026 Quebec general election as a member of the Parti Québécois.

Prior to his election, Paquet was Quebec's agent-general in the United Kingdom. He was appointed Minister of Economic Development, Innovation and Energy in 2026.

== Electoral record ==
2026 Quebec general election: Pointe-aux-Trembles
** Preliminary results — Not yet official **
Party	Candidate	Votes	%	±%
Parti Québécois	Stéphane Paquet	9,882	38.08	
Coalition Avenir Québec	Chantal Rouleau	4,843	18.66	
Liberal	Naïma Marylene Indira Som	4,586	17.67	
Québec solidaire	Mégane Charron	3,299	12.71	
Conservative	Maxim Tremblay	3,020	11.64	
Parti nul	Maude Chapdelaine	238	0.92	
Marxist–Leninist	Geneviève Royer	45	0.17	
Équipe Autonomiste	Daniel Lasalle	39	0.15	
Total valid votes				
Total rejected ballots				
Turnout			65.60	
Electors on the lists			–	–
Source: Élections Québec
