= Chantal Rouleau =

Canadian politician

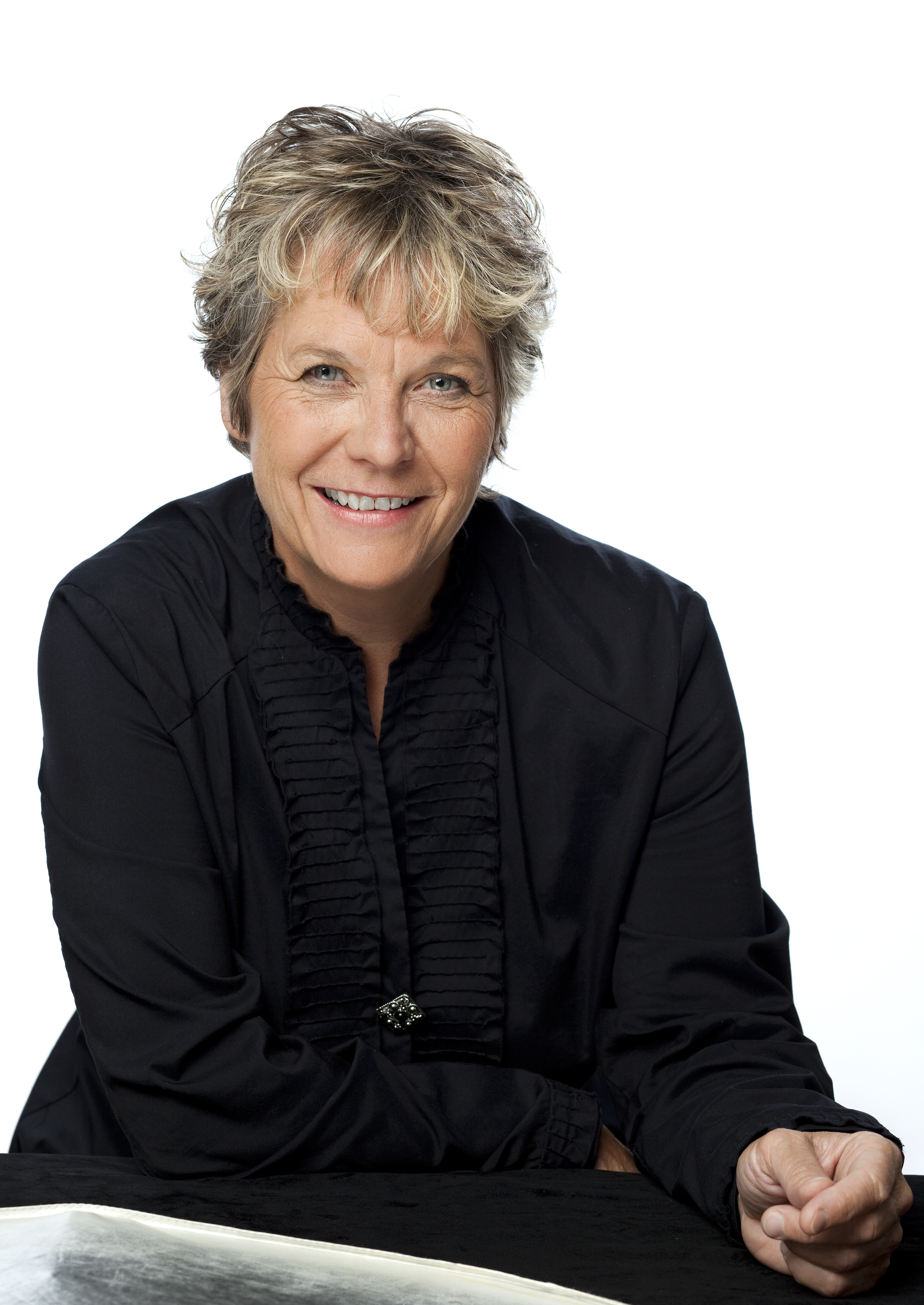
- Rouleau in 2009

Member of the National Assembly of Quebec for Pointe-aux-Trembles
- In office October 18, 2018 – October 5, 2026
- Preceded by: Nicole Léger
- Succeeded by: Stéphane Paquet

Quebec Minister for Social Solidarity and Community Action
- In office October 20, 2022 – October 21, 2026
- Preceded by: Jean Boulet
- Succeeded by: Mathieu Lebrun

Borough mayor for Rivière-des-Prairies–Pointe-aux-Trembles and Montreal City Councillor
- In office June 7, 2010 – October 2, 2018
- Preceded by: Joe Magri
- Succeeded by: Caroline Bourgeois

Personal details
- Born: July 4, 1959 (age 67) Repentigny, Quebec, Canada
- Party: Coalition Avenir Québec (provincial)
- Other political affiliations: Équipe Denis Coderre (2013–present); Vision Montréal (2010–2013)
- Occupation: Environmentalist; entrepreneur

Chantal Rouleau is a Canadian politician who was elected to the National Assembly of Quebec in the 2018 provincial election. She represented the electoral district of Pointe-aux-Trembles as a member of the Coalition Avenir Québec until 2026.

Prior to her election to the legislature, Rouleau served on Montreal City Council. She became mayor of the borough of Rivière-des-Prairies–Pointe-aux-Trembles in June 2010 following a municipal by-election. She was a member of the Vision Montréal municipal political party until May 30, 2013, when she left to join Équipe Denis Coderre. In 2018 she ran as a candidate for the Coalition Avenir Québec in Pointe-Aux-Trembles. She won, flipping a riding that has been solidly PQ for three decades. She won re-election in the 2022 Quebec election by a large margin. She has held three cabinet posts in the Legault government since 2018. Such as, Minister responsible for the Montréal region, Deputy Minister of Transport (2018-2022), and Minister of Social Solidarity and Community Action (2022-2026).

Rouleau had previously been involved in sustainable development initiatives in Montreal's east end for more than 30 years.

== Electoral record ==
=== Provincial ===
2026 Quebec general election: Pointe-aux-Trembles
** Preliminary results — Not yet official **
Party	Candidate	Votes	%	±%
Parti Québécois	Stéphane Paquet	9,882	38.08	
Coalition Avenir Québec	Chantal Rouleau	4,843	18.66	
Liberal	Naïma Marylene Indira Som	4,586	17.67	
Québec solidaire	Mégane Charron	3,299	12.71	
Conservative	Maxim Tremblay	3,020	11.64	
Parti nul	Maude Chapdelaine	238	0.92	
Marxist–Leninist	Geneviève Royer	45	0.17	
Équipe Autonomiste	Daniel Lasalle	39	0.15	
Total valid votes				
Total rejected ballots				
Turnout			65.60	
Electors on the lists			–	–
Source: Élections Québec

2022 Quebec general election: Pointe-aux-Trembles
Party	Candidate	Votes	%	±%
Coalition Avenir Québec	Chantal Rouleau	12,156	45.88	+6.92
Parti Québécois	Jocelyn Desjardins	5,265	19.87	-12.33
Québec solidaire	Simon Tremblay-Pepin	4,084	15.41	+0.55
Liberal	Byanca Jeune	2,750	10.38	-2.18
Conservative	Yves Beaulieu	1,804	6.81	–
Green	Alex Di Pardo	268	1.01	–
Climat Québec	Marc Michaud	82	0.30	–
Marxist–Leninist	Geneviève Royer	53	0.20	
Équipe Autonomiste	Louis Chandonnet	33	0.10	
Total valid votes			–	
Total rejected ballots			–	
Turnout				
Electors on the lists			–	–

2018 Quebec general election: Pointe-aux-Trembles
Party	Candidate	Votes	%	±%
Coalition Avenir Québec	Chantal Rouleau	10,579	38.96	+14.9
Parti Québécois	Jean-Martin Aussant	8,745	32.2	-11.02
Québec solidaire	Céline Pereira	4,036	14.86	+7.08
Liberal	Eric Ouellette	3,410	12.56	-9.84
Bloc Pot	Pierre Surette	218	0.8	
Équipe Autonomiste	Louis Chandonnet	89	0.33	+0.13
Marxist–Leninist	Geneviève Royer	79	0.29	+0
Total valid votes		27,156	97.87	
Total rejected ballots		592	2.13	
Turnout		27,748	67.43	
Eligible voters		41,148		
Coalition Avenir Québec gain from Parti Québécois		Swing		+12.96
Source(s) "Rapport des résultats officiels du scrutin". Élections Québec.

=== Municipal ===
2017 Montreal municipal election: Borough Mayor Rivière-des-Prairies–Pointe-aux-Trembles
Party	Candidate	Votes	%	±%
Équipe Denis Coderre	Chantal Rouleau	18,861	57.37	-8.57
Projet Montréal	Pietro Mercuri	14,013	42.63	+24.33
Total valid votes/expense limit		32,874	96.43	
Total rejected ballots		1,218	3.57	-2.58
Turnout		34,092	42.39	-0.12
Eligible voters		80,431	–	–

2013 Montreal municipal election: Borough Mayor Rivière-des-Prairies–Pointe-aux-Trembles
Party	Candidate	Votes	%	±%
Équipe Denis Coderre	Chantal Rouleau	20,755	65.94	new
Projet Montréal	Romeo Della Valle	5,759	18.30	+0.79
Coalition Montréal	Michel Taylor	4,963	15.77	new
Total valid votes/expense limit		31,477	93.85	
Total rejected ballots		2,064	6.15	+4.13
Turnout		33,541	42.51	-1.58
Eligible voters		78,909	–	–

Borough Mayor Rivière-des-Prairies–Pointe-aux-Trembles 2010 By election
Party	Candidate	Votes	%	±%
Vision Montreal	Chantal Rouleau	4,855	40.73	+4.45
Union Montreal	Barba Pisani	4,167	34.74	-6.53
Projet Montréal	Colette Paul	2,100	17.51	-2.18
Independent	André Bélisle	843	7.03	–
Total valid votes/expense limit		11,995	97.98	–
Total rejected ballots		248	2.02	-2.12
Turnout		12,243	15.75	-24.16
Eligible voters		77,725	–	–

2009 Montreal municipal election: Borough Mayor Rivière-des-Prairies–Pointe-aux-Trembles
Party	Candidate	Votes	%	±%
Union Montreal	Joe Magri	12,250	41.27	-9.03
Vision Montreal	Chantal Rouleau	10,770	36.28	-7.16
Projet Montréal	Thérèse Deschambault	5,845	19.69	+19.69
Independent	Michel Daoust	817	2.75	–
Total valid votes/expense limit		29,682	95.86	–
Total rejected ballots		1,282	4.14	–
Turnout		30,964	39.91	–
Eligible voters		78,909	–	–
