= Ministry of Employment and Social Solidarity =

The Ministry of Employment and Social Solidarity (in French: Ministère de l'Emploi et de la Solidarité sociale) is a government department in the Canadian province of Quebec. Its primary function is to promote employment and provide financial support for economically disadvantaged people.

The department is overseen by the Minister of Employment and Social Solidarity, who is a member of the Executive Council of Quebec. Ministerial responsibility for employment was separated from social solidarity in 2001, and a different minister assigned to each field. The positions were reunited in 2003. As of the 2022 election, they have been split into the Ministry of Employment and Ministry of Social solidarity. Jean-François Simard is the minister of employment while Chantal Rouleau is minister of Social Solidarity.
