= 2007 Quebec general election =

Canadian provincial election

- March 26, 2007

125 seats in the 38th National Assembly of Quebec 63 seats needed for a majority
- Turnout: 71.23% (▲0.81%)
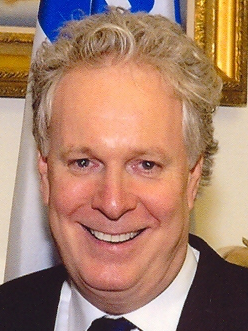

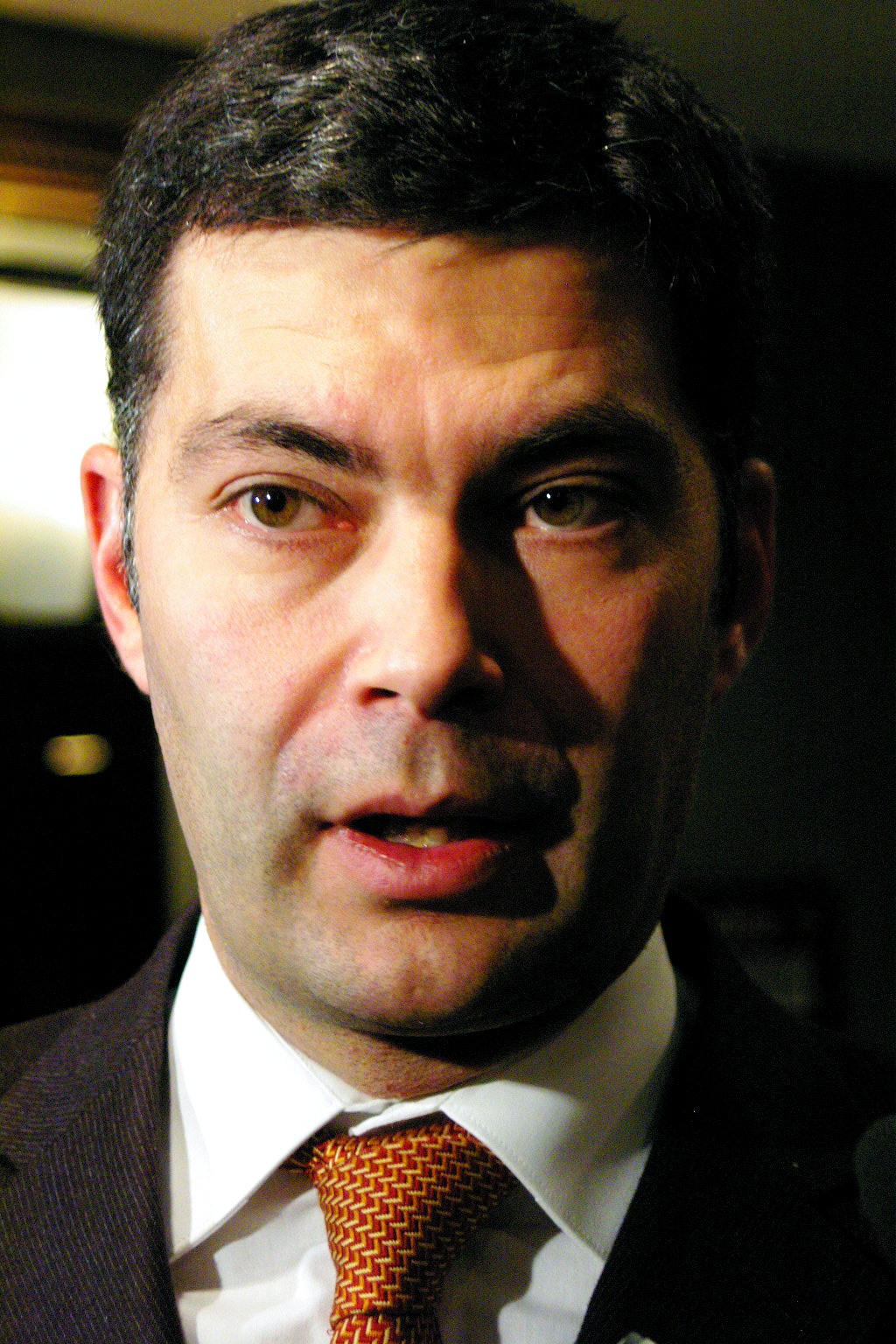

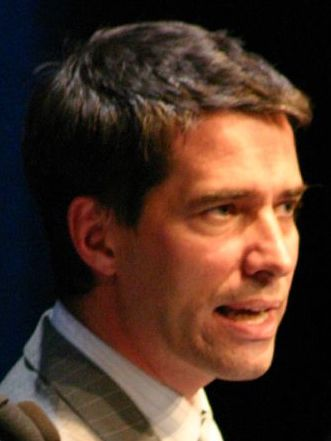
| | First party | Second party | Third party |
|---|---|---|---|
| Leader | Jean Charest | Mario Dumont | André Boisclair |
| Party | Liberal | Action démocratique | Parti Québécois |
| Leader since | April 30, 1998 | May 11, 1994 | November 15, 2005 |
| Leader's seat | Sherbrooke | Rivière-du-Loup | Pointe-aux-Trembles |
| Last election | 76 seats, 45.99% | 4 seats, 18.18% | 45 seats, 33.24% |
| Seats won | 48 | 41 | 36 |
| Seat change | ▼28 | ▲37 | ▼9 |
| Popular vote | 1,313,664 | 1,224,412 | 1,125,546 |
| Percentage | 33.08% | 30.84% | 28.35% |
| Swing | ▼12.91% | ▲12.63% | ▼4.91% |
- Popular vote by riding. As this is an FPTP election, seat totals are not determined by popular vote, but instead via results by each riding. Click the map for more details.
Premier before election
Jean Charest
Liberal
Premier after election
Jean Charest
Liberal

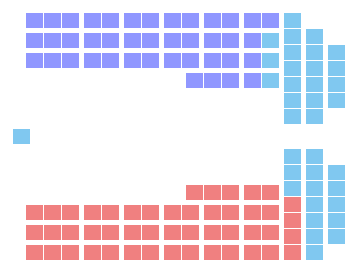
Seating plan following the election.

The 2007 Quebec general election was held in the Canadian province of Quebec on March 26, 2007 to elect members of the 38th National Assembly of Quebec. The Quebec Liberal Party led by Premier Jean Charest won a plurality of seats, but were reduced to a minority government, Quebec's first in 129 years, since the 1878 general election. The Action démocratique du Québec, in a major breakthrough, became the official opposition. The Parti Québécois was relegated to third-party status for the first time since the 1973 election. The Liberals won their lowest share of the popular vote since Confederation, and the PQ with their 28.35% of the votes cast won their lowest share since 1973 and their second lowest ever (ahead of only the 23.06% attained in their initial election campaign in 1970).

Each of the three major parties won nearly one-third of the popular vote, the closest three-way split (in terms of popular vote) in Quebec electoral history until the 2012 election. This was however, the closest three-way race in terms of seat count. Voter turnout among those eligible was 71.23%, a marginal difference from the previous general election in 2003.

This was the first time since the 1970s that a government was not returned for its second term with a majority.

== Overview ==
With just over a year left in the government's five year mandate, the Liberals called an election for March 26, 2007.

In August 2006, there were widespread rumours of an election to be held in the fall with speculation that Premier Jean Charest wanted to hold elections before a federal election would be held.

Benoît Pelletier, the minister responsible for electoral reform, had announced his plan to table two bills about election reform during the fall, possibly leading to a referendum on voting system reform to be held concurrently with the election. However, by December 2006, the plan was put off indefinitely due to strong resistance to the idea of proportional representation from within the Liberal Party.

Speculation grew that a provincial election would be held following the federal budget. It was thought that the federal Conservative government would present a budget that would address the perceived fiscal imbalance. This measure would help Charest argue that his government was more effective in getting concessions from the federal government than a PQ government would be. With polls showing Charest's Liberals ahead of the opposition for the first time in several years, speculation intensified that Charest would not wait until the federal budget to call a provincial election but call one in the winter to take advantage of both of these developments. Charest recalled the legislature early in order to table a provincial budget on February 20, 2007. On the same day, federal Minister of Finance Jim Flaherty announced that the federal budget would be tabled on March 19, clearing the way for Charest to set a provincial election for a week later in hopes of benefiting from Flaherty's budget. On February 21, Charest called the election for March 26.

=== Issues ===
Charest wants to negotiate a solution to the problem of the fiscal imbalance between the federal and provincial governments with Prime Minister Stephen Harper.

André Boisclair, leader of the Parti Québécois, had said he would hold a referendum (or "popular consultation", as in the party platform) on the issue of Quebec independence as soon as possible after an election win.

Multiculturalism, secularism and the place of cultural and religious minorities in Quebec were issues in this election. There was a large scale debate over "reasonable accommodation" towards cultural minorities, and a few political leaders expressed their views on the question. Mario Dumont, leader of the Action démocratique, took a clearer position on the question than the others, calling on the majority to protect some elements of national identity and values such as gender equality, and suggesting that a Quebec Constitution be written, in which the privileges cultural minorities are to be given would be clarified.

== Timeline ==
- 2005
  - November 15 - André Boisclair is elected as leader of the Parti Québécois with 53.7% of the vote from party members.
  - December 12 - Two by-elections are held. The election of Raymond Bachand allows the Liberals to keep the riding of Outremont, while former Bloc Québécois MP Stéphane Bergeron wins Verchères, Bernard Landry's former riding, for the Parti Québécois.
- 2006
  - February 4 - Québec solidaire, a new left-wing party, is formed from the merger of the Union des forces progressistes party and the Option citoyenne political movement.
  - February 28 - Raymond Bachand enters cabinet as Minister of Economic Development, Innovation and Export Trade. In this same cabinet shuffle, Thomas Mulcair loses the job of Environment minister to Claude Béchard. Some pundits speculate that Mulcair was punished for his opposition to the Mont Orford condo development project.
  - April 10 - The Parti Québécois keeps the riding of Sainte-Marie–Saint-Jacques in a by-election. Martin Lemay is elected with 41.2% of the vote. Notably, Manon Massé, the candidate from Québec solidaire, finishes third with 22.2% of the vote in this working-class district, while the Action démocratique only gets 1.9% of the vote, down from 8.3% in the 2003 general election.
  - August 14 - By-elections are held in Pointe-aux-Trembles and Taillon. André Boisclair is unsurprisingly and easily elected in Pointe-aux-Trembles, the Liberals and Action démocratique having declined to field candidates against him. The Greens place second with 12% and Québec solidaire, third with 8%. Marie Malavoy of the Parti Québécois is elected in Taillon.
  - August 22 - Boisclair and Malavoy are sworn in as members of the National Assembly. Boisclair becomes opposition leader.
  - October 17 - The fall session of the National Assembly starts, with the current crisis in Quebec's forestry industry as the most important issue.
  - November 27 - In a vote of 266 to 16, The House of Commons of Canada voted to recognise Québécois as a nation within a unified Canada, once again putting the issue of independence in the spotlight.
- 2007
  - January 19 - Radio-Canada reveals that Pierre Descoteaux, Liberal member from Groulx, almost crossed the floor to the Parti Québécois during the fall 2006.
  - January 22 - During a visit to France, André Boisclair meets Ségolène Royal, Socialist candidate for the 2007 presidential election. At this occasion, Royal expresses her support for the "liberty and sovereignty" of Quebec. After being criticized by several French media and French and Canadian politicians, such as prime minister Stephen Harper and opposition leader Stéphane Dion, Royal clarifies her thought by saying that she was not interfering in Canadian internal affairs or trying to dictate Quebec's policy, but that the future of Quebec will have to be decided by Quebecers.
  - February 14 - Pierre Arcand, former president of Corus and presumed Liberal candidate in Mont-Royal, expresses his displeasure with Action démocratique leader Mario Dumont by comparing him with Jean-Marie Le Pen. In response, Dumont threatens legal action but Arcand refuses to apologize. Premier Jean Charest stands by his candidate, and is called a "little partisan premier" by Dumont.
  - February 20 - Finance minister Michel Audet tables a budget. Among other measures, this budget promises income tax reductions of 250 million dollars and allocates new sums of money to the health and education systems, as well as to the maintenance of roads and bridges. Spending is also increased for the protection of the environment and for the regions' economic development.
  - February 21 - Premier Jean Charest calls a general election for March 26.
  - March 1 - Radio DJ Louis Champagne of Saguenay creates a controversy by attacking André Boisclair and the Parti Québécois candidate in Saguenay, Sylvain Gaudreault, over their homosexuality, saying that the factory workers of Jonquière would never vote for gays. He also says the Parti Québécois is like a "club of fags". (Gaudreault went on to win the riding.) Boisclair responds that Champagne's remarks are insulting towards the people of Saguenay. Premier Charest and Action démocratique leader Dumont also condemn the attacks. Champagne is later suspended from his job and has to apologize.
  - March 4 - Jean-François Plante, the Action démocratique candidate in Deux-Montagnes, makes controversial comments about women on his blog. Among other things, he questions the provincial government's policies of affirmative action for women and of wage equity between traditionally masculine and feminine occupations, claiming that they lead to discrimination against men. He retracts his comments on the next day, but also accuses André Boisclair of "playing" his homosexuality when it helps him. As a result, he is forced to withdraw his candidacy on March 8. He is replaced as ADQ candidate in Deux-Montagnes by Lucie Leblanc.
  - March 6 - Premier Jean Charest brings the issue of Quebec independence at the forefront of the campaign by saying, while speaking with an English-language journalist, that he does not believe that in the case of separation, Quebec would necessarily keep its territorial integrity. Charest later claims that what he had actually wanted to say was that Quebec was indivisible, but his opponents recall comments he had made in 1996, while he was the leader of the federal Progressive Conservatives, to the effect that in the case of a "yes" result in the 1995 referendum, the Cree and Inuit would have had a good legal basis on which to declare independence from Quebec.
  - March 8 - Newspaper La Presse publishes an article claiming that in a 2003 book, Robin Philpot, Parti Québécois candidate in Saint-Henri–Sainte-Anne, had denied that a genocide had taken place in Rwanda in 1994. Philpot later says that he had not denied that massacres had taken place, but that he wanted people to remember that they had been committed by all parties to the conflict. André Boisclair says that he is "hurt" by his candidate's comments and reminds that the existence of the Rwandan genocide is not in question.
  - March 13 - The leaders debate took place in Quebec City. The Liberals, the Parti Québécois and the Action démocratique du Québec took part but Québec solidaire and the Green party were not invited to participate.
  - March 19 - The federal government releases a budget which gives Quebec 2.3 billion dollars.
  - March 23 - There is widespread outcry when poll clerks are instructed on how to let women wearing the niqāb, an Islamic face veil, vote. After the longstanding policy was criticized by all three main parties, the chief electoral officer reversed his decision and stated that all voters would have to show their face, but not before being inundated by complaints from people opposed to this form of reasonable accommodation for the immigrant population. Meanwhile, women who actually wear the niqāb say they were never opposed to showing their face when voting.
  - March 26 - Election date.

== Political parties ==
=== Major parties ===
- Action démocratique du Québec
- Quebec Liberal Party
- Parti Québécois
- Green Party of Quebec
- Québec solidaire

=== Other parties ===
Additionally, several other parties were registered as well: Parti conscience universelle, Marxist–Leninist Party of Quebec, Equality Party, Bloc pot, and Union des forces progressistes.

== Campaign slogans ==
- Action démocratique du Québec: Au Québec, on passe à l'action - In Quebec, We're Taking Action
- Parti libéral du Québec: Unis pour réussir - Moving Forward Together
- Parti Québécois: Reconstruisons notre Québec - Rebuild Our Quebec
- Parti vert du Québec: Je vote - I vote
- Québec solidaire: Soyons lucides, votons solidaire - Let's Be Clear-Eyed, Let's Vote for Solidarity

== Incumbent MNAs not running for re-election ==
=== Liberals ===
- Michel Audet, Laporte
- Yvan Bordeleau, Acadie
- William Cusano, Viau
- Margaret Delisle, Jean-Talon
- Réjean Lafrenière, Gatineau
- Nicole Loiselle, Saint-Henri–Sainte-Anne
- Thomas Mulcair, Chomedey

=== Péquistes ===
- Solange Charest, Rimouski
- Michel Létourneau, Ungava
- Michel Morin, Nicolet-Yamaska
- Hélène Robert, Deux-Montagnes
- Stéphan Tremblay, Lac-Saint-Jean
- Jonathan Valois, Joliette
- Cécile Vermette, Marie-Victorin

=== Independent ===
- Daniel Bouchard, Mégantic-Compton

== Results ==
The overall results were:

Summary of the 26 March 2007 National Assembly of Quebec election results
| Party | Party leader | Candi- dates | Seats | | | | | Popular vote | | |
| Party | Party leader | Candi- dates | 2003 | Dissol. | 2007 | Change | % | # | % | Change |
|---|---|---|---|---|---|---|---|---|---|---|
| Liberal | Jean Charest | 125 | 76 | 72 | 48 | -28 | 38.40% | 1,313,664 | 33.08% | -12.91% |
| Action démocratique | Mario Dumont | 125 | 4 | 5 | 41 | +37 | 32.80% | 1,224,412 | 30.84% | +12.63% |
| Parti Québécois | André Boisclair | 125 | 45 | 45 | 36 | -9 | 28.80% | 1,125,546 | 28.35% | -4.91% |
| Green | Scott McKay | 108 | - | - | - | - | - | 152,885 | 3.85% | +3.41% |
| Québec solidaire | Régent Séguin^{†} | 123 | - | - | - | - | - | 144,418 | 3.64% | +2.58%^{‡} |
| Marxist–Leninist | Pierre Chénier | 24 | - | - | - | - | - | 2,091 | 0.05% | -0.02% |
| Bloc Pot | Hugô St-Onge | 9 | - | - | - | - | - | 1,564 | 0.04% | -0.56% |
| Christian Democracy | Gilles Noël | 12 | - | - | - | - | - | 1,548 | 0.04% | -0.05% |
| Independents and no affiliation | | 28 | - | 1 | - | - | - | 4,490 | 0.11% | -0.11% |
| Vacant | | | | 2 | | | | | | |
| Total | | 679 | 125 | 125 | 125 | - | 100% | 3,970,618 | 100% | |
Source: (official) Archived September 11, 2008, at the Wayback Machine Notes: "Change" refers to change from previous election^{†} Séguin was officially leader of Québec solidaire, but the main spokespersons for the party were Françoise David and Amir Khadir.^{‡} Results for Québec solidaire are compared to the 2003 results for the Union des forces progressistes.

=== Vote and seat summaries ===
Ternary plots - shift of electoral support (2003-2007)
2003

2007
Electoral districts identified by colours of winning parties

Vote share
| PLQ | 33.08% |
| ADQ | 30.84% |
| PQ | 28.35% |
| Green | 3.85% |
| QS | 3.64% |
| Others | 0.24% |

Seats summary
| Liberal | 38.40% |
| ADQ | 32.80% |
| PQ | 28.80% |

=== Results by region ===
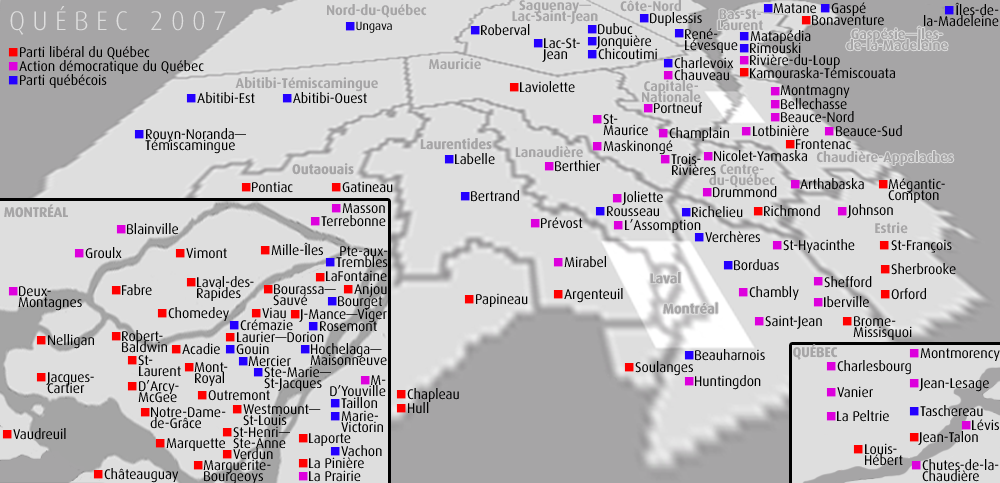
Results by region and riding

| Party Name | | 01 | 02 | 03 | 04 | 05 | 06 | 07 | 08 | 09 | 10 | 11 | 12 | 13 | 14 | 15 | 16 | 17 |
|---|---|---|---|---|---|---|---|---|---|---|---|---|---|---|---|---|---|---|
| Liberal | Seats: | 1 | 0 | 2 | 1 | 5 | 20 | 5 | 0 | 0 | 0 | 1 | 1 | 5 | 0 | 1 | 6 | 0 |
| Liberal | Popular Vote (%): | 32.67 | 32.70 | 28.02 | 29.03 | 34.09 | 47.20 | 45.42 | 30.41 | 21.64 | 32.52 | 41.67 | 28.25 | 39.35 | 17.13 | 23.41 | 28.86 | 26.67 |
| Action démocratique | Seats: | 1 | 0 | 7 | 4 | 1 | 0 | 0 | 0 | 0 | 0 | 0 | 7 | 0 | 5 | 5 | 8 | 3 |
| Action démocratique | Popular Vote (%): | 36.88 | 21.85 | 41.55 | 39.03 | 28.05 | 15.16 | 21.41 | 24.95 | 25.08 | 21.48 | 14.92 | 51.69 | 28.49 | 40.33 | 36.27 | 33.41 | 40.42 |
| Parti Québécois | Seats: | 2 | 5 | 2 | 0 | 0 | 8 | 0 | 3 | 2 | 1 | 3 | 0 | 0 | 1 | 2 | 7 | 0 |
| Parti Québécois | Popular Vote (%): | 26.79 | 41.09 | 23.63 | 28.70 | 29.63 | 24.03 | 22.36 | 39.22 | 48.35 | 41.41 | 39.42 | 16.36 | 25.40 | 36.15 | 34.65 | 30.98 | 27.59 |
Parties below won no seats
| Green | Popular Vote (%): | 2.10 | 1.63 | 3.48 | 1.37 | 4.53 | 6.74 | 6.78 | 0 | 2.49 | 0 | 0.58 | 1.70 | 3.99 | 3.41 | 3.03 | 3.57 | 1.01 |
| QS | Popular Vote (%): | 1.56 | 2.69 | 2.97 | 2.65 | 3.58 | 6.32 | 3.81 | 5.42 | 2.43 | 4.60 | 3.42 | 1.91 | 2.51 | 2.98 | 2.61 | 2.95 | 3.80 |
| M-LPQ | Popular Vote (%): | 0 | 0 | 0.02 | 0 | 0 | 0.95 | 0.22 | 0 | 0 | 0 | 0 | 0.01 | 0.05 | 0 | 0 | 0.01 | 0 |
| Bloc Pot | Popular Vote (%): | 0 | 0 | 0 | 0 | 0 | 0.72 | 0 | 0 | 0 | 0 | 0 | 0 | 0 | 0 | 0 | 0.09 | 0 |
| CDPQ | Popular Vote (%): | 0 | 0 | 0.18 | 0.04 | 0 | 0.48 | 0 | 0 | 0 | 0 | 0 | 0.05 | 0 | 0 | 0 | 0 | 0 |
| Independent | Popular Vote (%): | 0 | 0.04 | 0.14 | 0.35 | 0.17 | 0.80 | 0 | 0 | 0 | 0 | 0 | 0.03 | 0 | 0 | 0.04 | 0.13 | 0.50 |
| Total seats: | | 4 | 5 | 11 | 5 | 6 | 28 | 5 | 3 | 2 | 1 | 4 | 8 | 5 | 6 | 8 | 21 | 3 |

=== Results by place ===
| Party | Seats | Second | Third | Fourth | Fifth | Sixth | Seventh | Eighth | Ninth | Total |
|---|---|---|---|---|---|---|---|---|---|---|
| Liberal | 48 | 32 | 45 | 0 | 0 | 0 | 0 | 0 | 0 | 125 |
| Action démocratique | 41 | 46 | 32 | 4 | 2 | 0 | 0 | 0 | 0 | 125 |
| Parti Québécois | 36 | 42 | 44 | 3 | 0 | 0 | 0 | 0 | 0 | 125 |
| Green | 0 | 3 | 3 | 76 | 26 | 0 | 0 | 0 | 0 | 108 |
| Québec solidaire | 0 | 2 | 1 | 42 | 78 | 0 | 0 | 0 | 0 | 123 |
| Marxist–Leninist | 0 | 0 | 0 | 0 | 0 | 13 | 6 | 4 | 1 | 24 |
| Bloc Pot | 0 | 0 | 0 | 0 | 0 | 8 | 1 | 0 | 0 | 9 |
| Christian Democracy | 0 | 0 | 0 | 0 | 0 | 9 | 3 | 0 | 0 | 12 |
| Independents | 0 | 0 | 0 | 0 | 4 | 18 | 4 | 2 | 0 | 28 |

=== Synopsis of results ===
Results by riding - 2007 Quebec general election
| Riding | Winning party | | | | | | | | Turnout (Note: including spoilt ballots) | Votes (Note: All parties with more than 1% of the vote are shown individually. Independent candidates and other minor parties are aggregated separately. Parties are presented in the order shown on EQ data.) | | | | | | | |
| Name | 2003 | 1st place | Votes | Share | Margin # | Margin % | 2nd place | 3rd place | Turnout | PLQ | PQ | ADQ | QS | PVQ | Ind | Other | Total |
|---|---|---|---|---|---|---|---|---|---|---|---|---|---|---|---|---|---|
| Abitibi-Est | PLQ | PQ | 8,262 | 37.71% | 717 | 3.27% | PLQ | ADQ | 67.78% | 7,545 | 8,262 | 5,060 | 1,042 | – | – | – | 21,909 |
| Abitibi-Ouest | PQ | PQ | 10,983 | 48.38% | 5,454 | 24.02% | ADQ | PLQ | 70.75% | 5,376 | 10,983 | 5,529 | 814 | – | – | – | 22,702 |
| Acadie | PLQ | PLQ | 17,962 | 60.09% | 12,992 | 43.46% | PQ | ADQ | 62.03% | 17,962 | 4,970 | 4,327 | 1,135 | 1,500 | – | – | 29,894 |
| Anjou | PLQ | PLQ | 13,280 | 41.36% | 4,485 | 13.97% | PQ | ADQ | 72.04% | 13,280 | 8,795 | 7,409 | 1,151 | 1,376 | – | 99 | 32,110 |
| Argenteuil | PLQ | PLQ | 10,025 | 37.59% | 2,119 | 7.95% | ADQ | PQ | 68.52% | 10,025 | 6,891 | 7,906 | 600 | 1,244 | – | – | 26,666 |
| Arthabaska | PLQ | ADQ | 15,231 | 41.87% | 4,133 | 11.36% | PLQ | PQ | 76.00% | 11,098 | 7,892 | 15,231 | 1,125 | 1,030 | – | – | 36,376 |
| Beauce-Nord | ADQ | ADQ | 19,127 | 62.62% | 11,071 | 36.25% | PLQ | PQ | 77.92% | 8,056 | 2,392 | 19,127 | 361 | 525 | 83 | – | 30,544 |
| Beauce-Sud | PLQ | ADQ | 19,361 | 56.85% | 9,078 | 26.66% | PLQ | PQ | 74.09% | 10,283 | 3,578 | 19,361 | 834 | – | – | – | 34,056 |
| Beauharnois | PQ | PQ | 12,967 | 41.08% | 3,705 | 11.74% | ADQ | PLQ | 74.09% | 7,679 | 12,967 | 9,262 | 600 | 1,061 | – | – | 31,569 |
| Bellechasse | PLQ | ADQ | 12,715 | 48.51% | 3,711 | 14.16% | PLQ | PQ | 76.77% | 9,004 | 3,521 | 12,715 | 460 | 512 | – | – | 26,212 |
| Berthier | PQ | ADQ | 16,242 | 42.24% | 2,888 | 7.51% | PQ | PLQ | 72.73% | 6,687 | 13,354 | 16,242 | 1,087 | 1,084 | – | – | 38,454 |
| Bertrand | PQ | PQ | 13,672 | 37.02% | 2,484 | 6.73% | ADQ | PLQ | 71.10% | 9,082 | 13,672 | 11,188 | 1,228 | 1,766 | – | – | 36,936 |
| Blainville | PQ | ADQ | 17,731 | 41.84% | 3,547 | 8.37% | PQ | PLQ | 77.99% | 8,109 | 14,184 | 17,731 | 810 | 1,549 | – | – | 42,383 |
| Bonaventure | PLQ | PLQ | 10,221 | 52.88% | 4,511 | 23.34% | PQ | ADQ | 67.80% | 10,221 | 5,710 | 2,357 | 1,039 | – | – | – | 19,327 |
| Borduas | PQ | PQ | 12,529 | 38.76% | 2,406 | 7.44% | ADQ | PLQ | 79.58% | 7,010 | 12,529 | 10,123 | 944 | 1,459 | 262 | – | 32,327 |
| Bourassa-Sauvé | PLQ | PLQ | 15,631 | 50.08% | 8,526 | 27.32% | PQ | ADQ | 63.11% | 15,631 | 7,105 | 6,379 | 1,043 | 891 | 160 | – | 31,209 |
| Bourget | PQ | PQ | 13,422 | 41.26% | 5,935 | 18.24% | ADQ | PLQ | 69.89% | 7,433 | 13,422 | 7,487 | 1,363 | 2,632 | – | 195 | 32,532 |
| Brome-Missisquoi | PLQ | PLQ | 14,182 | 39.85% | 2,961 | 8.32% | ADQ | PQ | 71.88% | 14,182 | 7,238 | 11,221 | 1,032 | 1,917 | – | – | 35,590 |
| Chambly | PLQ | ADQ | 18,154 | 38.93% | 4,704 | 10.09% | PQ | PLQ | 79.58% | 11,240 | 13,450 | 18,154 | 1,527 | 2,265 | – | – | 46,636 |
| Champlain | PQ | ADQ | 15,872 | 44.81% | 5,001 | 14.12% | PQ | PLQ | 76.54% | 7,635 | 10,871 | 15,872 | 1,039 | – | – | – | 35,417 |
| Chapleau | PLQ | PLQ | 14,581 | 45.03% | 6,510 | 20.10% | ADQ | PQ | 61.97% | 14,581 | 7,137 | 8,071 | 774 | 1,755 | – | 65 | 32,383 |
| Charlesbourg | PLQ | ADQ | 17,207 | 43.36% | 6,364 | 16.04% | PLQ | PQ | 78.87% | 10,843 | 9,828 | 17,207 | 837 | 968 | – | – | 39,683 |
| Charlevoix | PQ | PQ | 9,099 | 37.67% | 1,663 | 6.88% | ADQ | PLQ | 73.99% | 6,541 | 9,099 | 7,436 | 527 | 553 | – | – | 24,156 |
| Châteauguay | PLQ | PLQ | 15,279 | 37.42% | 3,051 | 7.47% | ADQ | PQ | 73.85% | 15,279 | 11,208 | 12,228 | 967 | 1,154 | – | – | 40,836 |
| Chauveau | PLQ | ADQ | 22,013 | 55.59% | 13,164 | 33.24% | PLQ | PQ | 77.52% | 8,849 | 6,680 | 22,013 | 800 | 1,255 | – | – | 39,597 |
| Chicoutimi | PQ | PQ | 13,965 | 39.97% | 1,046 | 2.99% | PLQ | ADQ | 76.45% | 12,919 | 13,965 | 6,155 | 1,093 | 803 | – | – | 34,935 |
| Chomedey | PLQ | PLQ | 18,667 | 54.75% | 10,738 | 31.49% | ADQ | PQ | 62.90% | 18,667 | 5,180 | 7,929 | 683 | 1,237 | 299 | 103 | 34,098 |
| Chutes-de-la-Chaudière | ADQ | ADQ | 24,378 | 58.92% | 16,731 | 40.44% | PQ | PLQ | 81.38% | 7,292 | 7,647 | 24,378 | 854 | 1,203 | – | – | 41,374 |
| Crémazie | PLQ | PQ | 12,388 | 36.00% | 170 | 0.49% | PLQ | ADQ | 73.84% | 12,218 | 12,388 | 5,540 | 2,218 | 1,934 | – | 112 | 34,410 |
| D'Arcy-McGee | PLQ | PLQ | 18,410 | 84.21% | 16,940 | 77.49% | PVQ | ADQ | 53.10% | 18,410 | 710 | 934 | 338 | 1,470 | – | – | 21,862 |
| Deux-Montagnes | PQ | ADQ | 12,415 | 36.32% | 1,132 | 3.31% | PQ | PLQ | 76.37% | 8,183 | 11,283 | 12,415 | 740 | 1,448 | 114 | – | 34,183 |
| Drummond | PQ | ADQ | 15,349 | 38.50% | 2,389 | 5.99% | PQ | PLQ | 71.79% | 9,530 | 12,960 | 15,349 | 1,645 | – | 380 | – | 39,864 |
| Dubuc | PQ | PQ | 10,120 | 37.58% | 1,719 | 6.38% | ADQ | PLQ | 73.22% | 7,077 | 10,120 | 8,401 | 728 | 602 | – | – | 26,928 |
| Duplessis | PQ | PQ | 10,205 | 44.75% | 3,873 | 16.98% | PLQ | ADQ | 62.94% | 6,332 | 10,205 | 4,959 | 689 | 621 | – | – | 22,806 |
| Fabre | PLQ | PLQ | 14,615 | 34.86% | 1,208 | 2.88% | ADQ | PQ | 73.33% | 14,615 | 11,224 | 13,407 | 882 | 1,795 | – | – | 41,923 |
| Frontenac | PLQ | PLQ | 10,440 | 41.07% | 1,609 | 6.33% | ADQ | PQ | 77.09% | 10,440 | 5,264 | 8,831 | 391 | 496 | – | – | 25,422 |
| Gaspé | PQ | PQ | 7,662 | 40.96% | 640 | 3.42% | PLQ | ADQ | 68.04% | 7,022 | 7,662 | 3,162 | 858 | – | – | – | 18,704 |
| Gatineau | PLQ | PLQ | 13,602 | 44.95% | 6,392 | 21.12% | PQ | ADQ | 63.41% | 13,602 | 7,210 | 6,447 | 896 | 1,958 | – | 146 | 30,259 |
| Gouin | PQ | PQ | 11,318 | 37.25% | 3,408 | 11.22% | QS | PLQ | 70.09% | 5,612 | 11,318 | 3,540 | 7,910 | 1,750 | 109 | 147 | 30,386 |
| Groulx | PLQ | ADQ | 13,630 | 37.45% | 3,117 | 8.56% | PQ | PLQ | 75.35% | 9,898 | 10,513 | 13,630 | 850 | 1,503 | – | – | 36,394 |
| Hochelaga-Maisonneuve | PQ | PQ | 13,012 | 52.71% | 9,176 | 37.17% | ADQ | PLQ | 62.18% | 3,347 | 13,012 | 3,836 | 2,388 | 1,749 | 97 | 256 | 24,685 |
| Hull | PLQ | PLQ | 12,643 | 42.53% | 5,528 | 18.59% | PQ | ADQ | 61.26% | 12,643 | 7,115 | 5,071 | 2,358 | 2,476 | – | 67 | 29,730 |
| Huntingdon | PLQ | ADQ | 13,113 | 42.76% | 3,439 | 11.22% | PLQ | PQ | 70.90% | 9,674 | 6,926 | 13,113 | 669 | – | 281 | – | 30,663 |
| Iberville | PLQ | ADQ | 14,365 | 42.23% | 5,103 | 15.00% | PQ | PLQ | 76.13% | 8,390 | 9,262 | 14,365 | 776 | 1,224 | – | – | 34,017 |
| Îles-de-la-Madeleine | PQ | PQ | 4,820 | 60.39% | 2,178 | 27.29% | PLQ | ADQ | 76.10% | 2,642 | 4,820 | 380 | – | 139 | – | – | 7,981 |
| Jacques-Cartier | PLQ | PLQ | 22,481 | 70.24% | 18,508 | 57.82% | ADQ | PVQ | 67.35% | 22,481 | 1,352 | 3,973 | 491 | 3,545 | 166 | – | 32,008 |
| Jean-Lesage | PLQ | ADQ | 13,865 | 39.86% | 3,680 | 10.58% | PLQ | PQ | 72.65% | 10,185 | 7,990 | 13,865 | 1,236 | 1,159 | 131 | 216 | 34,782 |
| Jean-Talon | PLQ | PLQ | 13,732 | 41.96% | 3,873 | 11.84% | PQ | ADQ | 79.98% | 13,732 | 9,859 | 6,056 | 1,463 | 1,518 | – | 95 | 32,723 |
| Jeanne-Mance-Viger | PLQ | PLQ | 20,716 | 68.00% | 16,151 | 53.01% | ADQ | PQ | 63.26% | 20,716 | 3,659 | 4,565 | 635 | 790 | – | 101 | 30,466 |
| Johnson | PQ | ADQ | 11,511 | 36.02% | 180 | 0.56% | PQ | PLQ | 75.01% | 7,157 | 11,331 | 11,511 | 770 | 1,188 | – | – | 31,957 |
| Joliette | PQ | ADQ | 13,805 | 37.08% | 750 | 2.01% | PQ | PLQ | 74.76% | 7,527 | 13,055 | 13,805 | 1,693 | 1,149 | – | – | 37,229 |
| Jonquière | PLQ | PQ | 12,851 | 39.33% | 1,275 | 3.90% | PLQ | ADQ | 74.87% | 11,576 | 12,851 | 6,634 | 839 | 703 | 71 | – | 32,674 |
| Kamouraska-Témiscouata | PLQ | PLQ | 9,826 | 39.72% | 752 | 3.04% | ADQ | PQ | 72.39% | 9,826 | 4,804 | 9,074 | 521 | 515 | – | – | 24,740 |
| Labelle | PQ | PQ | 13,961 | 45.42% | 6,237 | 20.29% | ADQ | PLQ | 68.98% | 6,970 | 13,961 | 7,724 | 894 | 1,189 | – | – | 30,738 |
| Lac-Saint-Jean | PQ | PQ | 14,750 | 46.42% | 5,575 | 17.55% | PLQ | ADQ | 77.32% | 9,175 | 14,750 | 6,837 | 536 | 474 | – | – | 31,772 |
| LaFontaine | PLQ | PLQ | 16,281 | 62.46% | 11,526 | 44.22% | ADQ | PQ | 67.38% | 16,281 | 3,715 | 4,755 | 552 | 765 | – | – | 26,068 |
| La Peltrie | PLQ | ADQ | 21,055 | 51.06% | 9,884 | 23.97% | PLQ | PQ | 79.76% | 11,171 | 7,033 | 21,055 | 772 | 1,203 | – | – | 41,234 |
| La Pinière | PLQ | PLQ | 17,786 | 50.44% | 9,132 | 25.90% | ADQ | PQ | 66.51% | 17,786 | 6,281 | 8,654 | 860 | 1,684 | – | – | 35,265 |
| Laporte | PLQ | PLQ | 13,249 | 40.97% | 5,112 | 15.81% | PQ | ADQ | 70.92% | 13,249 | 8,137 | 7,699 | 1,256 | 1,998 | – | – | 32,339 |
| La Prairie | PLQ | ADQ | 14,453 | 33.79% | 1,285 | 3.00% | PQ | PLQ | 77.50% | 12,251 | 13,168 | 14,453 | 818 | 1,605 | 179 | 298 | 42,772 |
| L'Assomption | PQ | ADQ | 16,510 | 39.20% | 2,223 | 5.28% | PQ | PLQ | 76.16% | 8,235 | 14,287 | 16,510 | 1,303 | 1,777 | – | – | 42,112 |
| Laurier-Dorion | PLQ | PLQ | 12,064 | 39.66% | 1,096 | 3.60% | PQ | ADQ | 65.38% | 12,064 | 10,968 | 2,874 | 2,431 | 1,639 | 275 | 166 | 30,417 |
| Laval-des-Rapides | PLQ | PLQ | 11,532 | 34.41% | 1,494 | 4.46% | PQ | ADQ | 69.67% | 11,532 | 10,038 | 9,344 | 1,145 | 1,450 | – | – | 33,509 |
| Laviolette | PLQ | PLQ | 10,100 | 40.99% | 3,274 | 13.29% | ADQ | PQ | 72.59% | 10,100 | 6,687 | 6,826 | 468 | 494 | – | 66 | 24,641 |
| Lévis | PLQ | ADQ | 17,388 | 44.14% | 7,287 | 18.50% | PQ | PLQ | 79.33% | 9,925 | 10,101 | 17,388 | 802 | 1,015 | – | 163 | 39,394 |
| Lotbinière | ADQ | ADQ | 15,472 | 59.22% | 9,752 | 37.33% | PLQ | PQ | 78.07% | 5,720 | 4,305 | 15,472 | 630 | – | – | – | 26,127 |
| Louis-Hébert | PLQ | PLQ | 14,410 | 34.54% | 816 | 1.96% | ADQ | PQ | 81.33% | 14,410 | 10,429 | 13,594 | 1,326 | 1,734 | – | 225 | 41,718 |
| Marguerite-Bourgeoys | PLQ | PLQ | 16,752 | 57.14% | 11,205 | 38.22% | ADQ | PQ | 63.13% | 16,752 | 4,697 | 5,547 | 717 | 1,454 | – | 153 | 29,320 |
| Marguerite-D'Youville | PLQ | ADQ | 15,536 | 37.07% | 2,521 | 6.02% | PQ | PLQ | 82.63% | 11,401 | 13,015 | 15,536 | 1,958 | – | – | – | 41,910 |
| Marie-Victorin | PQ | PQ | 11,055 | 39.61% | 3,128 | 11.21% | ADQ | PLQ | 68.54% | 5,974 | 11,055 | 7,927 | 1,418 | 1,327 | – | 211 | 27,912 |
| Marquette | PLQ | PLQ | 14,985 | 47.77% | 8,525 | 27.17% | ADQ | PQ | 64.37% | 14,985 | 6,448 | 6,460 | 946 | 2,313 | 220 | – | 31,372 |
| Maskinongé | PLQ | ADQ | 14,862 | 40.04% | 4,095 | 11.03% | PLQ | PQ | 76.33% | 10,767 | 10,008 | 14,862 | 699 | 781 | – | – | 37,117 |
| Masson | PQ | ADQ | 18,808 | 43.83% | 3,394 | 7.91% | PQ | PLQ | 74.30% | 6,058 | 15,414 | 18,808 | 1,059 | 1,569 | – | – | 42,908 |
| Matane | PLQ | PQ | 7,830 | 39.10% | 213 | 1.06% | PLQ | ADQ | 72.27% | 7,617 | 7,830 | 3,980 | 358 | 240 | – | – | 20,025 |
| Matapédia | PQ | PQ | 9,041 | 43.70% | 3,605 | 17.42% | ADQ | PLQ | 70.39% | 5,137 | 9,041 | 5,436 | 551 | 526 | – | – | 20,691 |
| Mégantic-Compton | PLQ | PLQ | 8,071 | 32.98% | 210 | 0.86% | ADQ | PQ | 73.70% | 8,071 | 7,095 | 7,861 | 544 | 904 | – | – | 24,475 |
| Mercier | PQ | PQ | 9,426 | 33.35% | 1,123 | 3.97% | QS | PLQ | 69.32% | 5,601 | 9,426 | 2,381 | 8,303 | 2,398 | – | 156 | 28,265 |
| Mille-Îles | PLQ | PLQ | 15,978 | 38.74% | 4,648 | 11.27% | ADQ | PQ | 75.93% | 15,978 | 11,159 | 11,330 | 1,169 | 1,511 | 96 | – | 41,243 |
| Mirabel | PQ | ADQ | 15,241 | 44.43% | 3,550 | 10.35% | PQ | PLQ | 75.27% | 5,520 | 11,691 | 15,241 | 620 | 1,233 | – | – | 34,305 |
| Montmagny-L'Islet | PLQ | ADQ | 10,022 | 43.35% | 1,193 | 5.16% | PLQ | PQ | 72.64% | 8,829 | 3,512 | 10,022 | 310 | 445 | – | – | 23,118 |
| Montmorency | PLQ | ADQ | 20,796 | 51.55% | 11,672 | 28.93% | PLQ | PQ | 77.99% | 9,124 | 8,171 | 20,796 | 772 | 1,172 | 157 | 149 | 40,341 |
| Mont-Royal | PLQ | PLQ | 16,056 | 70.50% | 13,849 | 60.81% | PQ | ADQ | 54.45% | 16,056 | 2,207 | 1,893 | 801 | 1,710 | – | 108 | 22,775 |
| Nelligan | PLQ | PLQ | 21,458 | 63.82% | 15,362 | 45.69% | ADQ | PQ | 64.16% | 21,458 | 2,977 | 6,096 | 532 | 2,560 | – | – | 33,623 |
| Nicolet-Yamaska | PQ | ADQ | 10,839 | 41.18% | 3,384 | 12.86% | PQ | PLQ | 77.73% | 6,770 | 7,455 | 10,839 | 1,121 | – | 138 | – | 26,323 |
| Notre-Dame-de-Grâce | PLQ | PLQ | 14,077 | 61.43% | 10,472 | 45.70% | PVQ | PQ | 58.52% | 14,077 | 2,425 | 1,649 | 1,091 | 3,605 | – | 69 | 22,916 |
| Orford | PLQ | PLQ | 13,050 | 33.28% | 1,252 | 3.19% | ADQ | PQ | 74.08% | 13,050 | 11,158 | 11,798 | 1,404 | 1,798 | – | – | 39,208 |
| Outremont | PLQ | PLQ | 11,861 | 47.03% | 5,933 | 23.52% | PQ | PVQ | 62.69% | 11,861 | 5,928 | 2,236 | 2,303 | 2,725 | 101 | 68 | 25,222 |
| Papineau | PLQ | PLQ | 13,559 | 39.05% | 4,206 | 12.11% | PQ | ADQ | 64.62% | 13,559 | 9,353 | 9,115 | 1,039 | 1,654 | – | – | 34,720 |
| Pointe-aux-Trembles | PQ | PQ | 13,784 | 47.30% | 6,076 | 20.85% | ADQ | PLQ | 72.92% | 5,316 | 13,784 | 7,708 | 763 | 1,257 | – | 311 | 29,139 |
| Pontiac | PLQ | PLQ | 14,817 | 58.54% | 10,874 | 42.96% | ADQ | PQ | 56.53% | 14,817 | 3,257 | 3,943 | 729 | 2,498 | – | 66 | 25,310 |
| Portneuf | PLQ | ADQ | 15,496 | 45.92% | 4,635 | 13.73% | PLQ | PQ | 77.53% | 10,861 | 5,667 | 15,496 | 580 | 1,145 | – | – | 33,749 |
| Prévost | PQ | ADQ | 15,999 | 39.31% | 808 | 1.99% | PQ | PLQ | 72.26% | 7,929 | 15,191 | 15,999 | 1,578 | – | – | – | 40,697 |
| René-Lévesque | PQ | PQ | 12,160 | 51.78% | 5,518 | 23.50% | ADQ | PLQ | 68.61% | 3,723 | 12,160 | 6,642 | 426 | 533 | – | – | 23,484 |
| Richelieu | PQ | PQ | 11,411 | 38.03% | 1,998 | 6.66% | ADQ | PLQ | 75.11% | 7,275 | 11,411 | 9,413 | 778 | 986 | 145 | – | 30,008 |
| Richmond | PLQ | PLQ | 11,257 | 42.32% | 3,078 | 11.57% | ADQ | PQ | 74.52% | 11,257 | 5,485 | 8,179 | 746 | 805 | 129 | – | 26,601 |
| Rimouski | PQ | PQ | 12,925 | 40.58% | 3,531 | 11.09% | ADQ | PLQ | 74.26% | 6,988 | 12,925 | 9,394 | 1,894 | 651 | – | – | 31,852 |
| Rivière-du-Loup | ADQ | ADQ | 15,276 | 58.47% | 7,886 | 30.18% | PLQ | PQ | 78.27% | 7,390 | 2,821 | 15,276 | – | 639 | – | – | 26,126 |
| Robert-Baldwin | PLQ | PLQ | 22,132 | 74.76% | 18,890 | 63.81% | ADQ | PVQ | 58.62% | 22,132 | 1,581 | 3,242 | 514 | 2,136 | – | – | 29,605 |
| Roberval | PLQ | PQ | 13,506 | 41.75% | 2,365 | 7.31% | PLQ | ADQ | 72.70% | 11,141 | 13,506 | 6,638 | 1,065 | – | – | – | 32,350 |
| Rosemont | PQ | PQ | 14,146 | 38.60% | 4,175 | 11.39% | PLQ | ADQ | 70.86% | 9,971 | 14,146 | 6,936 | 3,433 | 1,931 | – | 231 | 36,648 |
| Rousseau | PQ | PQ | 14,670 | 41.78% | 1,410 | 4.02% | ADQ | PLQ | 69.03% | 5,402 | 14,670 | 13,260 | 789 | 992 | – | – | 35,113 |
| Rouyn-Noranda-Témiscamingue | PLQ | PQ | 9,481 | 33.11% | 129 | 0.45% | PLQ | ADQ | 68.17% | 9,352 | 9,481 | 7,687 | 2,117 | – | – | – | 28,637 |
| Sainte-Marie-Saint-Jacques | PQ | PQ | 10,501 | 41.34% | 4,480 | 17.64% | PLQ | QS | 60.86% | 6,021 | 10,501 | 2,733 | 3,596 | 2,460 | – | 92 | 25,403 |
| Saint-François | PLQ | PLQ | 12,528 | 37.86% | 2,740 | 8.28% | PQ | ADQ | 73.80% | 12,528 | 9,788 | 7,892 | 1,111 | 1,772 | – | – | 33,091 |
| Saint-Henri-Sainte-Anne | PLQ | PLQ | 11,915 | 38.49% | 2,753 | 8.89% | PQ | ADQ | 61.04% | 11,915 | 9,162 | 5,422 | 2,037 | 2,179 | – | 244 | 30,959 |
| Saint-Hyacinthe | PQ | ADQ | 13,233 | 35.73% | 1,318 | 3.56% | PQ | PLQ | 76.36% | 9,584 | 11,915 | 13,233 | 1,034 | 1,267 | – | – | 37,033 |
| Saint-Jean | PLQ | ADQ | 17,189 | 42.22% | 5,273 | 12.95% | PQ | PLQ | 75.03% | 10,131 | 11,916 | 17,189 | 1,478 | – | – | – | 40,714 |
| Saint-Laurent | PLQ | PLQ | 19,970 | 67.81% | 16,542 | 56.17% | PQ | ADQ | 57.87% | 19,970 | 3,428 | 3,373 | 856 | 1,681 | – | 141 | 29,449 |
| Saint-Maurice | PQ | ADQ | 9,788 | 37.72% | 1,294 | 4.99% | PQ | PLQ | 72.57% | 6,487 | 8,494 | 9,788 | 796 | – | 387 | – | 25,952 |
| Shefford | PLQ | ADQ | 16,643 | 42.11% | 5,746 | 14.54% | PLQ | PQ | 73.06% | 10,897 | 9,280 | 16,643 | 1,310 | 1,178 | – | 210 | 39,518 |
| Sherbrooke | PLQ | PLQ | 13,136 | 36.56% | 1,332 | 3.71% | PQ | ADQ | 74.23% | 13,136 | 11,804 | 6,409 | 2,263 | 2,203 | 115 | – | 35,930 |
| Soulanges | PLQ | PLQ | 10,689 | 36.03% | 1,477 | 4.98% | ADQ | PQ | 73.95% | 10,689 | 7,821 | 9,212 | 442 | 1,389 | 113 | – | 29,666 |
| Taillon | PQ | PQ | 14,040 | 35.47% | 1,452 | 3.67% | ADQ | PLQ | 71.83% | 9,104 | 14,040 | 12,588 | 1,873 | 1,977 | – | – | 39,582 |
| Taschereau | PQ | PQ | 12,340 | 37.10% | 3,178 | 9.56% | ADQ | PLQ | 70.54% | 7,073 | 12,340 | 9,162 | 2,741 | 1,860 | 81 | – | 33,257 |
| Terrebonne | PQ | ADQ | 17,224 | 41.26% | 2,064 | 4.94% | PQ | PLQ | 76.51% | 6,720 | 15,160 | 17,224 | 1,136 | 1,508 | – | – | 41,748 |
| Trois-Rivières | PLQ | ADQ | 10,247 | 37.20% | 2,385 | 8.66% | PLQ | PQ | 73.49% | 7,862 | 7,672 | 10,247 | 907 | 739 | 121 | – | 27,548 |
| Ungava | PQ | PQ | 4,555 | 41.41% | 978 | 8.89% | PLQ | ADQ | 46.47% | 3,577 | 4,555 | 2,363 | 506 | – | – | – | 11,001 |
| Vachon | PQ | PQ | 11,560 | 34.88% | 227 | 0.68% | ADQ | PLQ | 75.20% | 8,184 | 11,560 | 11,333 | 755 | 1,309 | – | – | 33,141 |
| Vanier | PLQ | ADQ | 20,699 | 51.44% | 10,966 | 27.25% | PLQ | PQ | 76.36% | 9,733 | 7,694 | 20,699 | 859 | 1,149 | – | 103 | 40,237 |
| Vaudreuil | PLQ | PLQ | 15,465 | 44.20% | 6,678 | 19.08% | ADQ | PQ | 72.58% | 15,465 | 8,217 | 8,787 | 686 | 1,837 | – | – | 34,992 |
| Verchères | PQ | PQ | 13,811 | 41.25% | 1,316 | 3.93% | ADQ | PLQ | 78.46% | 4,751 | 13,811 | 12,495 | 1,020 | 1,407 | – | – | 33,484 |
| Verdun | PLQ | PLQ | 12,204 | 40.94% | 3,516 | 11.80% | PQ | ADQ | 64.45% | 12,204 | 8,688 | 5,239 | 1,430 | 1,868 | 80 | 298 | 29,807 |
| Viau | PLQ | PLQ | 12,917 | 51.92% | 7,511 | 30.19% | PQ | ADQ | 59.33% | 12,917 | 5,406 | 4,157 | 1,231 | 1,169 | – | – | 24,880 |
| Vimont | PLQ | PLQ | 14,936 | 35.97% | 2,038 | 4.91% | ADQ | PQ | 76.13% | 14,936 | 11,215 | 12,898 | 871 | 1,606 | – | – | 41,526 |
| Westmount-Saint-Louis | PLQ | PLQ | 13,368 | 67.59% | 11,037 | 55.80% | PVQ | PQ | 49.23% | 13,368 | 1,646 | 1,554 | 807 | 2,331 | – | 73 | 19,779 |

= open seat
= turnout is above provincial average
= winning candidate was in previous Legislature
= incumbent had switched allegiance
= previously incumbent in another riding
= not incumbent; was previously elected to the Legislature
= incumbency arose from byelection gain
= other incumbents renominated
= previously an MP in the House of Commons of Canada
= multiple candidates

=== Comparative analysis for ridings (2007 vs 2003) ===
Summary of riding results by turnout and vote share for winning candidate (vs 2003)
| Riding and winning party | | | Turnout | | Vote share | |
| Riding and winning party | | | % | Change (pp) | % | Change (pp) |
|---|---|---|---|---|---|---|
| Abitibi-Est | PQ | Gain | 67.78 | 1.37 | 37.71 | 4.06 |
| Abitibi-Ouest | PQ | Hold | 70.75 | 3.98 | 48.38 | 2.94 |
| Acadie | PLQ | Hold | 62.03 | -3.63 | 60.09 | -10.31 |
| Anjou | PLQ | Hold | 72.04 | -1.26 | 41.36 | -12.33 |
| Argenteuil | PLQ | Hold | 68.52 | 2.07 | 37.59 | -15.73 |
| Arthabaska | ADQ | Gain | 76.00 | 2.38 | 41.87 | 8.80 |
| Beauce-Nord | ADQ | Hold | 77.92 | 1.95 | 62.62 | 16.75 |
| Beauce-Sud | ADQ | Gain | 74.09 | 1.64 | 56.85 | 17.13 |
| Beauharnois | PQ | Hold | 74.09 | -0.23 | 41.08 | -3.76 |
| Bellechasse | ADQ | Gain | 76.77 | 0.68 | 48.51 | 15.40 |
| Berthier | ADQ | Gain | 72.73 | 3.37 | 42.24 | 10.38 |
| Bertrand | PQ | Hold | 71.10 | 0.74 | 37.02 | -6.31 |
| Blainville | ADQ | Gain | 77.99 | 3.27 | 41.84 | 21.13 |
| Bonaventure | PLQ | Hold | 67.80 | -2.60 | 52.88 | -7.20 |
| Borduas | PQ | Hold | 79.58 | 1.75 | 38.76 | -8.06 |
| Bourassa-Sauvé | PLQ | Hold | 63.11 | -1.11 | 50.08 | -10.99 |
| Bourget | PQ | Hold | 69.89 | -1.45 | 41.26 | -4.16 |
| Brome-Missisquoi | PLQ | Hold | 71.88 | 1.44 | 39.85 | -15.79 |
| Chambly | ADQ | Gain | 79.58 | 1.13 | 38.93 | 22.49 |
| Champlain | ADQ | Gain | 76.54 | 18.84 | 44.81 | 20.22 |
| Chapleau | PLQ | Hold | 61.97 | 3.28 | 45.03 | -17.37 |
| Charlesbourg | ADQ | Gain | 78.87 | -0.19 | 43.36 | 15.04 |
| Charlevoix | PQ | Hold | 73.99 | 2.29 | 37.67 | -5.96 |
| Châteauguay | PLQ | Hold | 73.85 | -0.48 | 37.42 | -14.39 |
| Chauveau | ADQ | Gain | 77.52 | 0.64 | 55.59 | 21.52 |
| Chicoutimi | PQ | Hold | 76.45 | 4.56 | 39.97 | -3.73 |
| Chomedey | PLQ | Hold | 62.90 | -3.96 | 54.75 | -16.35 |
| Chutes-de-la-Chaudière | ADQ | Hold | 81.38 | 0.99 | 58.92 | 20.10 |
| Crémazie | PQ | Gain | 73.84 | 0.40 | 36.00 | -3.92 |
| D'Arcy-McGee | PLQ | Hold | 53.10 | -8.54 | 84.21 | -7.08 |
| Deux-Montagnes | ADQ | Gain | 76.37 | 2.00 | 36.32 | 14.63 |
| Drummond | ADQ | Gain | 71.79 | 1.30 | 38.50 | 18.11 |
| Dubuc | PQ | Hold | 73.22 | 5.16 | 37.58 | -1.32 |
| Duplessis | PQ | Hold | 62.94 | -0.53 | 44.75 | -3.16 |
| Fabre | PLQ | Hold | 73.33 | -2.16 | 34.86 | -11.99 |
| Frontenac | PLQ | Hold | 77.09 | -0.67 | 41.07 | -2.58 |
| Gaspé | PQ | Hold | 68.04 | -0.68 | 40.96 | -6.44 |
| Gatineau | PLQ | Hold | 63.41 | 2.83 | 44.95 | -15.74 |
| Gouin | PQ | Hold | 70.09 | 2.07 | 37.25 | -16.10 |
| Groulx | ADQ | Gain | 75.35 | 1.83 | 37.45 | 18.07 |
| Hochelaga-Maisonneuve | PQ | Hold | 62.18 | 2.09 | 52.71 | -3.05 |
| Hull | PLQ | Hold | 61.26 | 2.80 | 42.53 | -14.72 |
| Huntingdon | ADQ | Gain | 70.90 | -1.45 | 42.76 | 24.95 |
| Iberville | ADQ | Gain | 76.13 | 2.37 | 42.23 | 20.46 |
| Îles-de-la-Madeleine | PQ | Hold | 76.10 | -1.33 | 60.39 | 1.70 |
| Jacques-Cartier | PLQ | Hold | 67.35 | -2.90 | 70.24 | -16.55 |
| Jean-Lesage | ADQ | Gain | 72.65 | 0.41 | 39.86 | 14.51 |
| Jeanne-Mance-Viger | PLQ | Hold | 63.26 | -4.44 | 68.00 | -11.89 |
| Jean-Talon | PLQ | Hold | 79.98 | -0.47 | 41.96 | -3.63 |
| Johnson | ADQ | Gain | 75.01 | 2.27 | 36.02 | 14.06 |
| Joliette | ADQ | Gain | 74.76 | 3.33 | 37.08 | 15.65 |
| Jonquière | PQ | Gain | 74.87 | 4.19 | 39.33 | 2.75 |
| Kamouraska-Témiscouata | PLQ | Hold | 72.39 | 1.49 | 39.72 | -6.03 |
| La Prairie | ADQ | Gain | 77.50 | 1.59 | 33.79 | 16.75 |
| Labelle | PQ | Hold | 68.98 | 0.30 | 45.42 | -1.15 |
| Lac-Saint-Jean | PQ | Hold | 77.32 | 7.74 | 46.42 | -7.29 |
| Lafontaine | PLQ | Hold | 67.38 | -3.44 | 62.46 | -7.08 |
| Lapeltrie | ADQ | Gain | 79.76 | 0.74 | 51.06 | 17.25 |
| Lapinière | PLQ | Hold | 66.51 | -3.45 | 50.44 | -13.92 |
| Laporte | PLQ | Hold | 70.92 | -0.87 | 40.97 | -14.25 |
| L'Assomption | ADQ | Gain | 76.16 | 1.00 | 39.20 | 21.16 |
| Laurier-Dorion | PLQ | Hold | 65.38 | 1.02 | 39.66 | -13.47 |
| Laval-des-Rapides | PLQ | Hold | 69.67 | -0.15 | 34.41 | -10.32 |
| Laviolette | PLQ | Hold | 72.59 | 0.42 | 40.99 | -11.68 |
| Lévis | ADQ | Gain | 79.33 | 1.78 | 44.14 | 15.07 |
| Lotbinière | ADQ | Hold | 78.07 | 0.49 | 59.22 | 21.17 |
| Louis-Hébert | PLQ | Hold | 81.33 | 0.20 | 34.54 | -9.98 |
| Marguerite-Bourgeoys | PLQ | Hold | 63.13 | -5.01 | 57.14 | -13.31 |
| Marguerite-D'Youville | ADQ | Gain | 82.63 | 0.70 | 37.07 | 20.39 |
| Marie-Victorin | PQ | Hold | 68.54 | 1.50 | 39.61 | -5.78 |
| Marquette | PLQ | Hold | 64.37 | -1.74 | 47.77 | -17.30 |
| Maskinongé | ADQ | Gain | 76.33 | 1.72 | 40.04 | 13.76 |
| Masson | ADQ | Gain | 74.30 | 3.45 | 43.83 | 21.67 |
| Matane | PQ | Gain | 72.27 | 4.71 | 39.10 | -1.56 |
| Matapédia | PQ | Hold | 70.39 | 1.42 | 43.70 | -1.78 |
| Mégantic-Compton | PLQ | Hold | 73.70 | 1.32 | 32.98 | -14.11 |
| Mercier | PQ | Hold | 69.32 | -0.24 | 33.35 | -11.91 |
| Mille-Îles | PLQ | Hold | 75.93 | -0.21 | 38.74 | -11.44 |
| Mirabel | ADQ | Gain | 75.27 | 3.25 | 44.43 | 10.05 |
| Montmagny-L'Islet | ADQ | Gain | 72.64 | 0.31 | 43.35 | 6.53 |
| Montmorency | ADQ | Gain | 77.99 | 0.90 | 51.55 | 19.84 |
| Mont-Royal | PLQ | Hold | 54.45 | -5.15 | 70.50 | -10.41 |
| Nelligan | PLQ | Hold | 64.16 | -5.49 | 63.82 | -13.78 |
| Nicolet-Yamaska | ADQ | Gain | 77.73 | -0.09 | 41.18 | 18.63 |
| Notre-Dame-de-Grâce | PLQ | Hold | 58.52 | -3.27 | 61.43 | -13.16 |
| Orford | PLQ | Hold | 74.08 | 2.66 | 33.28 | -16.19 |
| Outremont | PLQ | Hold | 62.69 | -0.12 | 47.03 | -6.87 |
| Papineau | PLQ | Hold | 64.62 | 3.59 | 39.05 | -18.97 |
| Pointe-aux-Trembles | PQ | Hold | 72.92 | 0.62 | 47.30 | -2.89 |
| Pontiac | PLQ | Hold | 56.53 | 1.09 | 58.54 | -17.98 |
| Portneuf | ADQ | Gain | 77.53 | 0.47 | 45.92 | 12.51 |
| Prévost | ADQ | Gain | 72.26 | 2.97 | 39.31 | 19.50 |
| René-Lévesque | PQ | Hold | 68.61 | 5.54 | 51.78 | 10.92 |
| Richelieu | PQ | Hold | 75.11 | 2.19 | 38.03 | -8.33 |
| Richmond | PLQ | Hold | 74.52 | 0.72 | 42.32 | -14.89 |
| Rimouski | PQ | Hold | 74.26 | 3.20 | 40.58 | -7.13 |
| Rivière-du-Loup | ADQ | Hold | 78.27 | 5.61 | 58.47 | 1.24 |
| Robert-Baldwin | PLQ | Hold | 58.62 | -6.64 | 74.76 | -11.12 |
| Roberval | PQ | Gain | 72.70 | 4.25 | 41.75 | 3.38 |
| Rosemont | PQ | Hold | 70.86 | -0.46 | 38.60 | -5.17 |
| Rousseau | PQ | Hold4.07 | 69.03 | 4.07 | 41.78 | -6.07 |
| Rouyn-Noranda-Témiscamingue | PQ | Gain | 68.17 | 0.75 | 33.11 | -0.98 |
| Saint-François | PLQ | Hold | 73.80 | 2.13 | 37.86 | -14.46 |
| Saint-Henri-Sainte-Anne | PLQ | Hold | 61.04 | 0.00 | 38.49 | -14.42 |
| Saint-Hyacinthe | ADQ | Gain | 76.36 | 1.64 | 35.73 | 13.46 |
| Saint-Jean | ADQ | Gain | 75.03 | 2.69 | 42.22 | 23.29 |
| Saint-Laurent | PLQ | Hold | 57.87 | -5.74 | 67.81 | -9.84 |
| Saint-Maurice | ADQ | Gain | 72.57 | -0.10 | 37.72 | 5.58 |
| Sainte-Marie-Saint-Jacques | PQ | Hold | 60.86 | -0.64 | 41.34 | -8.50 |
| Shefford | ADQ | Gain | 73.06 | 3.15 | 42.11 | 19.20 |
| Sherbrooke | PLQ | Hold | 74.23 | 0.74 | 36.56 | -10.39 |
| Soulanges | PLQ | Hold | 73.95 | -0.24 | 36.03 | -14.96 |
| Taillon | PQ | Hold | 71.83 | 0.81 | 35.47 | -10.38 |
| Taschereau | PQ | Hold | 70.54 | 1.17 | 37.10 | -1.84 |
| Terrebonne | ADQ | Gain | 76.51 | 3.21 | 41.26 | 23.09 |
| Trois-Rivières | ADQ | Gain | 73.49 | 0.98 | 37.20 | 18.04 |
| Ungava | PQ | Hold | 46.47 | -4.06 | 41.41 | -8.71 |
| Vachon | PQ | Hold | 75.20 | 1.29 | 34.88 | -5.57 |
| Vanier | ADQ | Gain | 76.36 | -0.39 | 51.44 | 20.62 |
| Vaudreuil | PLQ | Hold | 72.58 | -1.45 | 44.20 | -13.48 |
| Verchères | PQ | Hold | 78.46 | 0.77 | 41.25 | -13.53 |
| Verdun | PLQ | Hold | 64.45 | 1.44 | 40.94 | -11.58 |
| Viau | PLQ | Hold | 59.33 | -3.47 | 51.92 | -13.21 |
| Vimont | PLQ | Hold | 76.13 | 0.09 | 35.97 | -10.34 |
| Westmount-Saint-Louis | PLQ | Hold | 49.23 | -3.63 | 67.59 | -12.64 |

=== Seats that changed hands ===
Elections to the National Assembly – seats won/lost by party, 2003–2007
| Party | 2003 | Gain from (loss to) | | | | | | 2007 |
| Party | 2003 | PLQ | | PQ | | ADQ | | 2007 |
|---|---|---|---|---|---|---|---|---|
| Liberal | 76 | | | | (6) | | (22) | 48 |
| Parti Québécois | 45 | 6 | | | | | (15) | 36 |
| Action démocratique | 4 | 22 | | 15 | | | | 41 |
| Total | 125 | 28 | – | 15 | (6) | – | (37) | 125 |

=== Summary analysis ===
Party candidates in 2nd place
| Party in 1st place | Party in 2nd place | | | | | Total |
| Party in 1st place | Lib | PQ | ADQ | QS | PVQ | Total |
|---|---|---|---|---|---|---|
| Liberal | | 19 | 26 | | 3 | 48 |
| Parti Québécois | 14 | | 20 | 2 | | 36 |
| Action démocratique | 18 | 23 | | | | 41 |
| Total | 32 | 42 | 46 | 2 | 3 | 125 |

Candidates ranked 1st to 5th place, by party
| Parties | 1st | 2nd | 3rd | 4th | 5th |
|---|---|---|---|---|---|
| █ Liberal | 48 | 32 | 45 | | |
| █ Action démocratique | 41 | 46 | 32 | 4 | 2 |
| █ Parti Québécois | 36 | 42 | 44 | 3 | |
| █ Green | | 3 | 3 | 76 | 26 |
| █ Québec solidaire | | 2 | 1 | 42 | 78 |
| █ Independent | | | | 4 | |

Resulting composition of the National Assembly (2007)
| Source | | Party | | | |
|---|---|---|---|---|---|
| Source | | Lib | PQ | ADQ | Total |
| Seats retained | Incumbents returned | 37 | 25 | 4 | 66 |
| Seats retained | Open seats held | 9 | 5 | | 14 |
| Seats retained | Open seat held - taken by previous incumbent from another riding | 1 | | | 1 |
| Seats retained | Byelection losses reversed | 1 | | | 1 |
| Seats changing hands | Incumbents defeated | | 6 | 32 | 38 |
| Seats changing hands | Open seats gained | | | 4 | 4 |
| Seats changing hands | Byelection gains held | | | 1 | 1 |
| Total | | 48 | 36 | 41 | 125 |

=== Most marginal 2-way and 3-way contests ===
Top 10 marginal 2-way contests (2007)
| Riding | 1st | 2nd | 1st vs 2nd |
|---|---|---|---|
| Rouyn-Noranda-Témiscamingue | 33.11% | 32.66% | 0.45% |
| Crémazie | 36.00% | 36.51% | 0.49% |
| Johnson | 36.02% | 35.46% | 0.56% |
| Vachon | 34.88% | 34.20% | 0.68% |
| Mégantic-Compton | 32.98% | 32.12% | 0.86% |
| Matane | 35.42% | 33.21% | 1.06% |
| Louis-Hébert | 39.10% | 38.04% | 1.96% |
| Prévost | 39.31% | 37.33% | 1.99% |
| Joliette | 37.08% | 35.07% | 2.01% |
| Fabre | 34.86% | 31.98% | 2.88% |

Top 10 marginal 3-way contests (2007)
| Riding | 1st | 2nd | 3rd | 1st vs 3rd |
|---|---|---|---|---|
| Mégantic-Compton | 32.98% | 32.12% | 28.99% | 3.99% |
| Orford | 33.28% | 30.09% | 28.46% | 4.82% |
| La Prairie | 33.79% | 30.79% | 28.64% | 5.15% |
| Rouyn-Noranda-Témiscamingue | 33.11% | 32.66% | 26.84% | 6.27% |
| Laval-des-Rapides | 34.41% | 29.96% | 27.89% | 6.52% |
| Fabre | 34.86% | 31.98% | 26.77% | 8.09% |
| Vimont | 35.97% | 31.06% | 27.01% | 8.96% |
| Louis-Hébert | 34.54% | 32.59% | 25.00% | 9.54% |
| Soulanges | 36.03% | 31.05% | 26.36% | 9.67% |
| Marguerite-D'Youville | 37.07% | 31.05% | 27.20% | 9.87% |

== Opinion polls ==
During the election campaign

Before the election

| Polling Firm | Last Date of Polling | Link | Liberal | Parti Québécois | Action démocratique | Québec solidaire | Green (PVQ) | Other |
| Angus Reid Strategies | March 24, 2007 | PDF | 31 | 29 | 30 | 5 | 6 | 0 |
| Léger Marketing | March 24, 2007 | PDF | 35 | 29 | 26 | 4 | 5 | 1 |
| CROP | March 22, 2007 | PDF | 34 | 28 | 25 | 5 | 8 | 0 |
| Strategic Counsel | March 21, 2007 | HTML | 30 | 31 | 28 | 5 | 6 | 0 |
| Strategic Counsel | March 16, 2007 | PDF | 30 | 32 | 26 | 5 | 7 | 0 |
| Léger Marketing | March 15, 2007 | PDF | 33 | 30 | 30 | 3 | 4 | 0 |
| SES | March 14–15, 2007 | HTML | 26 | 24 | 15 | 4 | 5 | (26 Unsure) |
| CROP | March 13, 2007 | PDF | 30 | 30 | 31 | 4 | 4 | 1 |
| CROP | March 8, 2007 | PDF | 33 | 29 | 26 | 6 | 6 | 0 |
| Léger Marketing | March 1, 2007 | PDF | 36 | 29 | 25 | 5 | 5 | 0 |
| Léger Marketing | February 24, 2007 | PDF | 37 | 28 | 23 | 6 | 6 | 0 |
| CROP | February 20, 2007 | PDF | 35 | 32 | 18 | 5 | 10 | 0 |
| CROP | February 15, 2007 | HTML | 35 | 33 | 19 | 5 | 8 | 0 |
| Léger Marketing | February 10, 2007 | PDF | 36 | 31 | 21 | 5 | 5 | 2 |
| Léger Marketing | January 28, 2007 | PDF | 34 | 32 | 24 | 5 | 5 | 0 |
| CROP | January 28, 2007 | HTML | 37 | 34 | 12 | 4 | 8 | 1 |
| Léger Marketing | December 5, 2006 | PDF | 36 | 35 | 20 | 7 | 6 | 0 |
| Environics | October, 2006 | HTML | 31 | 50 | 12 | 3 | 4 | 0 |
| CROP | September 24, 2006 | HTML | 37 | 37 | 12 | 4 | 9 | 1 |
| CROP | August 28, 2006 | HTML | 32 | 37 | 13 | 7 | 9 | 2 |
| Léger Marketing | June 25, 2006 | PDF | 37 | 33 | 17 | 6 | 7 | 0 |
| CROP | June 25, 2006 | HTML | 32 | 35 | 16 | 7 | 9 | 1 |
| Léger Marketing | April 30, 2006 | PDF | 29 | 34 | 15 | 8 | 7 | 7 |
| Léger Marketing | March 12, 2006 | PDF | 32 | 43 | 11 | 6 | 8 | 0 |

- *Swammer performs "live" trend analysis, meaning the results are updated daily.

=== By Language ===
==== French ====
Voting intentions among French speakers

Timeline of opinion polls
| Polling organisation | Last date of polling | Source | Sample size | MoE | PQ | PLQ | ADQ | QS | Other | Lead |
|---|---|---|---|---|---|---|---|---|---|---|
| Angus Reid | 23 March 2007 | PDF | | | 31 | 23 | 34 | | | |
| CROP | 22 March 2007 | PDF | | | 33 | 25 | 29 | 5 | 8 (Note: Green Party of Quebec) | |
| Leger | 15 March 2007 | PDF | | | 34 | 24 | 35 | 4 | 4 (Note: Green Party of Quebec) | |
| CROP | March 8, 2007 | PDF | | | 32 | 24 | 31 | 6 | 7 (Note: 6 for Green Party of Quebec, 1 for other) | |
| CROP | 20 February 2007 | PDF | | | 39 | 27 | 22 | 5 | 9 (Note: 8 for Green Party of Quebec, 1 for other) | |
| Leger | 28 January 2007 | PDF | | | 37 | 28 | 26 | 6 | 4 | |
| CROP | September 24, 2006 | PDF | | | 36 | 23 | 16 | | 11 | |
| Leger | June 25, 2006 | PDF | | | 38 | 29 | 19 | 7 | 7 | |
| Leger | April 30, 2006 | PDF | | | 43 | 25 | 17 | 9 | 5 | |
| Leger | March 12, 2006 | PDF | | | 49 | 25 | 13 | 6 | 7 | |
| CROP | February 25, 2006 | PDF | | | 48 | 22 | 16 | | | |
| CROP | January 29, 2006 | PDF | | | 57 | 18 | 16 | | | |
| Leger | 27 November 2005 | PDF | | | 53 | 26 | 16 | | 4 | |
| CROP | October 26, 2005 | PDF | | | 58 | 18 | 22 | | 2 | |
| Leger | September 11, 2005 | PDF | | | 55 | 25 | 18 | | 2 | |
| CROP | June 27, 2005 | PDF | | | 48 | 14 | 20 | | 3 | |
| CROP | May 30, 2005 | PDF | | | 55 | 16 | 23 | | 0 | |
| Leger | 8 May 2005 | PDF | | | 53 | 18 | 26 | | 2 | |
| CROP | April 24, 2005 | PDF | | | 46 | 15 | 23 | | 2 | |
| Leger | April 3, 2005 | PDF | | | 53 | 13 | 28 | | 6 | |
| Leger | December 12, 2004 | PDF | | | 39 | 28 | 22 | | 11 | |
| CROP | November 25, 2004 | PDF | | | 37 | 23 | 24 | | 11 | |
| Leger | November 15, 2004 | PDF | | | 48 | 27 | 21 | | 4 | |
| CROP | October 24, 2004 | PDF | | | 40 | 21 | 22 | | 0 | |
| CROP | August 25, 2004 | PDF | | | 45 | 21 | 16 | | | |
| Leger | April 10, 2004 | PDF | | | 50 | 24 | 18 | | 8 | |
| CROP | 29 March 2004 | PDF | | | 45 | 17 | 18 | | | |
| CROP | February 22, 2004 | PDF | | | 40 | 21 | 22 | | | |
| Leger | January 18, 2004 | PDF | | | 49 | 26 | 19 | | 6 | |
| CROP | December 17, 2003 | PDF | | | 39 | 25 | 17 | | 6 | |
| CROP | October 24, 2003 | PDF | | | 38 | 29 | 15 | | 1 | |
| CROP | September 29, 2003 | PDF | | | 38 | 31 | 15 | | | |
| Leger | August 24, 2003 | PDF | | | 43 | 40 | 14 | | | |
| Leger | May 4, 2003 | PDF | | | 41 | 37 | 20 | | 2 | |

==== Non French ====
Timeline of opinion polls
| Polling organisation | Last date of polling | Source | Sample size | MoE | PLQ | PQ | ADQ | QS | Other | Lead |
|---|---|---|---|---|---|---|---|---|---|---|
| CROP | 22 March 2007 | PDF | | | 70 | 6 | 13 | 4 | 7 (Note: Green Party of Quebec) | |
| Leger | 15 March 2007 | PDF | | | 72 | 12 | 9 | 1 | 6 (Note: Green Party of Quebec) | |
| CROP | 20 February 2007 | PDF | | | 67 | 8 | 3 | 3 | 19 (Note: 18 for Green Party of Quebec, 1 for other) | |
| Leger | 28 January 2007 | PDF | | | 63 | 12 | 15 | 2 | 8 | |
| Leger | June 25, 2006 | PDF | | | 69 | 11 | 7 | 1 | 12 | |
| Leger | April 30, 2006 | PDF | | | 62 | 11 | 14 | 6 | 7 | |
| Leger | March 12, 2006 | PDF | | | 62 | 12 | 2 | 5 | 19 | |
| Leger | 27 November 2005 | PDF | | | 61 | 21 | 8 | | 10 | |
| CROP | October 26, 2005 | PDF | | | 71 | 8 | 12 | | 9 | |
| Leger | September 11, 2005 | PDF | | | 48 | 28 | 16 | | 8 | |
| Leger | April 3, 2005 | PDF | | | 61 | 22 | 7 | | 10 | |
| Leger | December 12, 2004 | PDF | | | 54 | 28 | 9 | | 9 | |
| Leger | November 15, 2004 | PDF | | | 70 | 15 | 10 | | 5 | |
| Leger | April 10, 2004 | PDF | | | 71 | 16 | 7 | | 6 | |
| Leger | January 18, 2004 | PDF | | | 71 | 17 | 4 | | 8 | |
| Leger | August 24, 2003 | PDF | | | 81 | 13 | 4 | | 2 | |
| Leger | May 4, 2003 | PDF | | | 76 | 13 | 9 | | 2 | |

== See also ==
- 38th National Assembly of Quebec
- Liste de sondages sur les élections générales québécoises de 2007 Opinion polling for the 2007 Quebec general election
- Politics of Quebec
- List of premiers of Quebec
- List of leaders of the Official Opposition (Quebec)
- National Assembly of Quebec
- Timeline of Quebec history
- Political parties in Quebec
