= Parti Unité Nationale =

Parti unité nationale
- Leader: Paul Biron
- Founder: Gilles Noël
- Founded: 2000
- Dissolved: 2018
- Headquarters: Lévis, Quebec
- Ideology: Christian democracy Social conservatism Quebec nationalism
- Colours: Blue

Website
- www.partiun.ca

The Parti unité nationale (French pronunciation: [paʁti ynite nɑsjɔnal]; "National Unity Party"), formerly the Parti démocratie chrétienne du Québec (pronounced [paʁti demɔkʁasi kʁetjɛn dy kebɛk]; "Christian Democracy Party of Quebec"), was a social conservative political party in Quebec, Canada. It was founded in 2000 by Roman Catholics associated with the Centre d’Information nationale Robert Rumilly. The founding leader of the party was Gilles Noël. The party's final leader was Paul Biron, a retired engineer, whose brother, Rodrigue Biron, was leader of the conservative Union Nationale party from 1976 to 1980.

Its program was a combination of Christian orthodoxy and Quebec nationalism. The party is concerned about the declining birth rate in Quebec, opposed to same-sex marriage and abortion, wants more support for families, and wider availability of Quebec-made consumer products.

The Parti démocratie chrétienne du Québec's 24 candidates won 3,575 votes in the April 2003 general election, or about 0.1% of the popular vote. It proposed to fight the aging of Quebec's population by favouring the family through the creation of a family benefit of $430 per month per child under the age of 18. The party also proposed eliminating the $5/day universal child care program offered by the Government of Quebec at the time.

The party won 1,620 votes in the March 2007 general election, or about 0.04% of the popular vote.

Logo of the former Parti démocratie chrétienne du Québec

On 29 June 2012, the Chief Electoral Officer of Quebec approved the name of the party to be changed to "Parti Unité Nationale".

== Party leaders ==
1. Gilles Noël (2000-2005)
2. Michel Bélanger (2005-2006) interim
3. Gilles Noël (2006-2007)
4. Albert Malcom Tremblay (2007-2010)
5. Michel Bélanger (2010)
6. Paul Biron (2010—2018)

== Election results ==
General election	Candidates	Elected candidates	Popular vote
2003	24	0	0.09%
2007	12	0	0.04%
2012	12	0	0.03%
2014	3	0	0.00%

== Election results ==
Election	Leader	Seats contested	Seats won	+/-	Votes	%	Rank	Status/Gov.
2003	Gilles Noël	25 / 125	0 / 125	Steady	3,226	0.08%	8th out of 9	Extra-parliamentary
2007	Gilles Noël	12 / 125	0 / 125	Steady	1,548	0.04%	8th	Extra-parliamentary
2012	Paul Biron	12 / 125	0 / 125	Steady	1,227	0.03%	15th out of 18	Extra-parliamentary
2014	Paul Biron	3 / 125	0 / 125	Steady	241	0.01%	15th out of 18	Extra-parliamentary

== See also ==
- Politics of Quebec
- List of political parties in Quebec
- National Assembly of Quebec
