= Benoît Pelletier =

Canadian politician (1960–2024)

Benoît Pelletier CM OQ FRSC
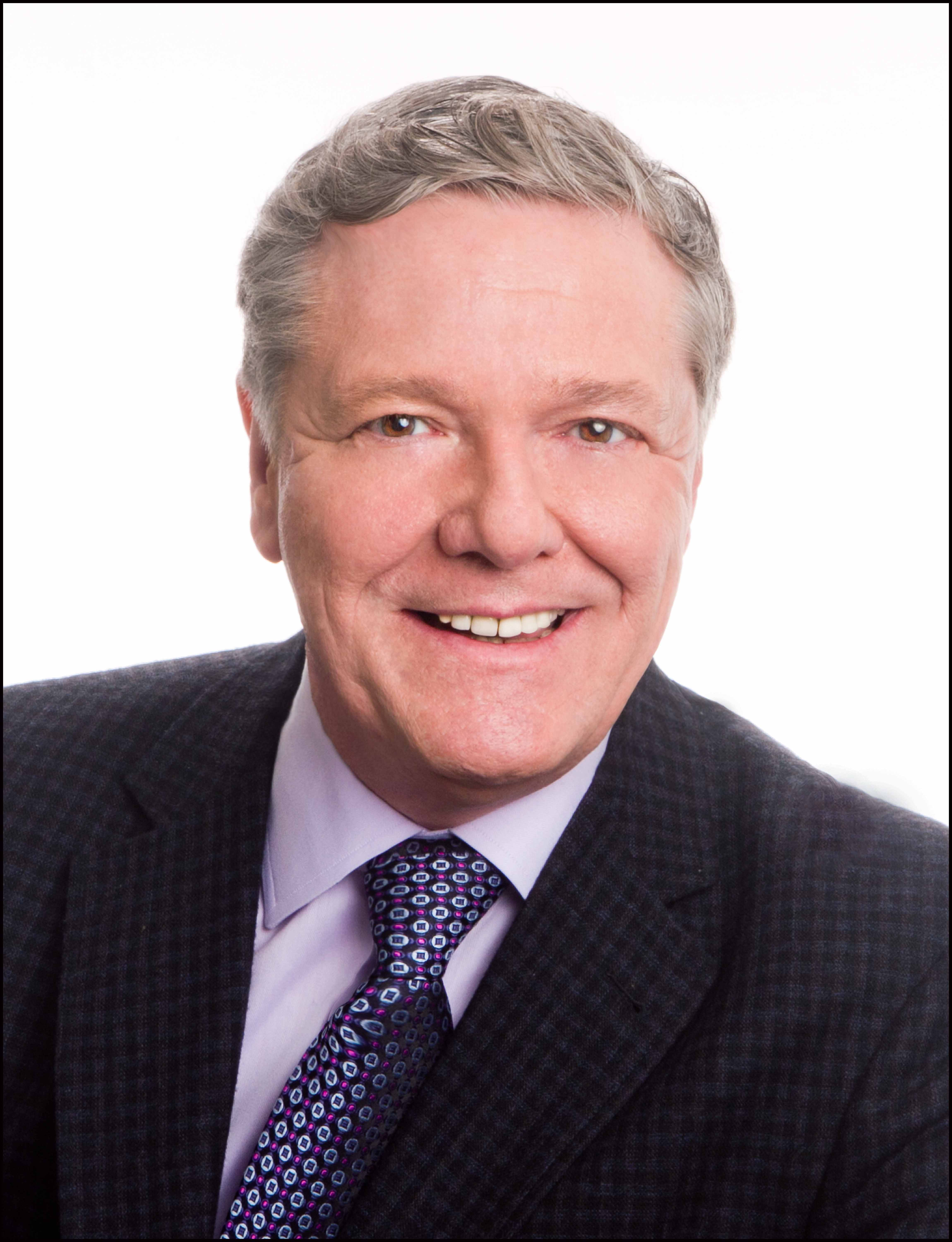

Minister of Canadian Intergovernmental Affairs
- In office 29 April 2003 – 18 December 2008
- Preceded by: Jean-Pierre Charbonneau
- Succeeded by: Jacques Dupuis

Minister of Aboriginal Affairs
- In office 29 April 2003 – 18 February 2005
- Preceded by: Rémy Trudel and Michel Létourneau
- Succeeded by: Geoffrey Kelley
- In office 18 April 2007 – 18 December 2008
- Preceded by: Geoffrey Kelley
- Succeeded by: Pierre Corbeil

Leader of the Government in Parliament
- In office 18 April 2007 – 5 November 2008
- Preceded by: Jacques Dupuis
- Succeeded by: Jacques Dupuis

Minister responsible for the reform of democratic institutions
- In office 18 February 2005 – 18 December 2008
- Preceded by: Jacques Dupuis
- Succeeded by: Jacques Dupuis

Minister responsible for the Outaouais
- In office 29 April 2003 – 18 December 2008
- Preceded by: Sylvain Simard
- Succeeded by: Norman MacMillan

Member of the National Assembly of Quebec for Chapleau
- In office 30 November 1998 – 5 November 2008
- Preceded by: Claire Vaive
- Succeeded by: Marc Carrière

Personal details
- Born: 10 January 1960 Quebec City, Quebec, Canada
- Died: 30 March 2024 (aged 64) Mexico
- Party: Liberal
- Profession: Lawyer, professor

Benoît Pelletier CM OQ FRSC (10 January 1960 – 30 March 2024) was a Canadian lawyer, academic, and politician in the province of Quebec.

He was a Liberal member of the National Assembly of Quebec from 1998 to 2008 and was a prominent cabinet minister in the government of Jean Charest. He was best known for promoting the concept of "asymmetric federalism" to incorporate Quebec nationalism into a decentralized Canadian federal structure.

== Early life and career ==
Pelletier was born in Quebec City, Quebec on 10 January 1960. His father, Jean-Paul Pelletier, was an administrator and municipal councillor.

Pelletier received a law degree from Université Laval in 1981 and was admitted to the Barreau du Québec the following year. He later earned a Master's Degree in law from the University of Ottawa (1989) and doctorates in law from the University of Paris I: Panthéon-Sorbonne (1996) and the Aix-Marseille University (2000).

Pelletier was a legal adviser at the Canadian Department of Justice from 1983 to 1990, when he received a faculty position at the University of Ottawa. He taught there for several years and was recognized as professor of the year in 1998. He also authored several works on constitutional law and was often interviewed as an expert on the subject in the 1990s. He has been a guest professor at the Universities of Nantes (1993), Corsica (1997), Paris II (1998), Paris V (1998) and Lyon III (1998), as well as at Queens and Cornell Universities (both 2016). He has also twice been a visiting scholar at the Woodrow Wilson International Center for Scholars in Washington, D.C.

From 2009 to 2011, he was a lawyer with the firm Noël et associés. He was the Government of Canada's chief negotiator on the Huron-Wendat (2011–2013) and Cree (2013–2016) dossiers. In 2014–2015, he was Special Representative to the Minister of Indigenous and Northern Affairs Canada in relation to the five-year review of the Specific Claims Tribunal Act.

Pelletier was one of three members of an external panel established in 2015 by the federal government to study the issues surrounding medically assisted dying.

== Legislator ==
Pelletier was first elected to the National Assembly of Quebec in the 1998 provincial election, winning the safe Liberal seat of Chapleau in the Outaouais region. The Parti Québécois (PQ) won a majority government in this election, and Pelletier entered the legislature as an opposition member. In January 1999, Liberal leader Jean Charest appointed him to the high-profile post of critic for Intergovernmental Affairs. As a member of Quebec's Official Opposition (1998–2003), at the outset of his political career, Benoît Pelletier was appointed Quebec Liberal Party critic on Intergovernmental Affairs. From 1999 to 2001, he was also Chairman of the Liberal Party's Special Committee on the political and constitutional future of Quebec society. In this role, he developed the Party's position on intergovernmental relations.

After his appointment, Pelletier was commissioned to lead a comprehensive review of the Liberal Party's constitutional platform. Two years later, he brought forward a policy document entitled, Quebec's Choice: Affirmation, Autonomy and Leadership. Its highlights included a call for the Canadian Constitution to recognize the "specificity" of Quebec; a requirement that judges consider this "specificity" when ruling on charter rights cases that affect Quebec government policy; a provincial veto over constitutional changes; greater provincial autonomy over international affairs, telecommunications, and the environment; and the creation of a new council for overseeing federal-provincial issues. This document marked a shift away from former Liberal premier Robert Bourassa's definition of Quebec as a "distinct society," and Pelletier acknowledged that his party was taking a more "pro-Canada" stance than in past years. He said, "what [Quebecers] want above all is to say [...] that they want to be Canadians, but in their own way." Quebec's Choice helped launch Jean Charest's drive to create the Council of the Federation, and Pelletier has sometimes been recognized as the council's chief architect.

Pelletier was very critical of the approach taken by Jean Chrétien's federal government in fighting the Quebec sovereignty movement. During the period of the Gomery inquiry, he remarked that the sponsorship scandal was caused by figures in the Canadian government who believed that "with money you could change the view of the population."

When the Chrétien government introduced the Clarity Act in 2000, the PQ government in Quebec responded with a bill proclaiming Quebec's right to self-determination. While Pelletier opposed the Clarity Act, he also led the Liberal Party's opposition to the latter bill, which he argued was the prelude to a new referendum on sovereignty. He instead introduced a motion in the national assembly recognizing Quebec's right to declare independence if the Canadian government did not negotiate in good faith after a sovereigntist victory in a hypothetical future referendum. (The motion itself was not an endorsement of independence.)

== Cabinet minister ==
The Liberal Party won a majority government in the 2003 Quebec general election, and Pelletier was returned by an increased margin in Chapleau. On 29 April 2003, he was appointed to the Charest cabinet as minister of Canadian Intergovernmental Affairs and minister of Aboriginal Affairs as well as minister responsible for the Outaouais.

On 18 February 2005, he was relieved of his responsibilities for Aboriginal Affairs and given new responsibilities for Francophone Canadians and the reform of democratic institutions. From 17 March 2005, he was also styled as the minister responsible for the Agreement on Internal Trade and the minister responsible for Access to Information. Pelletier was President of the Federal-Provincial-Territorial Committee of Ministers on Internal Trade from December 2004 to December 2005. He was also a member of the Special Committee on Electoral Reform from June 2005 to May 2006.

Pelletier was returned by a reduced margin in the 2007 provincial election, as a surge in support for the Action démocratique du Québec reduced the Liberals to a minority government. Following a cabinet shuffle on 17 April 2007, Pelletier kept his existing ministerial designations (except for responsibility for the Agreement on Internal Trade) and was once again assigned to Aboriginal Affairs. He also became leader of the government in parliament.

=== Intergovernmental Affairs Minister ===
2003–06 (Chrétien and Martin governments)

Pelletier became Intergovernmental Affairs Minister near the end of Jean Chrétien's tenure as prime minister of Canada. Most of his interactions were with Chrétien's successors, Paul Martin and Stephen Harper.

Pelletier often defended Quebec's political jurisdiction against what he regarded as encroachments from the Canadian government. He spoke against Employment Insurance reforms introduced by the Martin government in 2004 and later criticized Martin's attempt to create a national child care plan with funds targeted to guidelines determined by federal government. (Quebec has had a provincial child care plan for several years.) Pelletier argued that provinces should be allowed to opt out of these and related federal plans and to set up alternative models with federal funding. Notwithstanding their disagreements, Pelletier and his counterparts in the Canadian government completed a four-year deal on child care funding just before the Martin administration fell in late 2005.

Pelletier also supported Quebec's autonomy in the management of health care. In early 2005, he announced that the province would undertake a controversial experiment with some private health providers. While stressing that he supported the five principles of Canadian medicare and favoured the public system, he nonetheless called for "some adjustments that would allow participation for the private partners."

Pelletier also negotiated with the Martin government for Quebec to have a more autonomous role in international forums such as UNESCO, and for changes to the system of federal–provincial transfers (known to some as the fiscal imbalance). In late 2004, he wrote guest columns for the English-language The Globe and Mail and National Post newspapers defending the principle of asymmetric federalism.

2006–08 (Harper government)

Pelletier initially welcomed the victory of Stephen Harper's Conservative Party in the 2006 federal election, saying that it created an opportunity "to improve Canada, to get a new vision of Canadian federalism, and to strengthen Quebec within Canada." After the election, Harper fulfilled a campaign pledge to give Quebec a seat at UNESCO. (Some, however, have noted that the provincial delegate cannot in practice take positions contrary to Canada's representative.)

In late 2006, Pelletier endorsed Harper's parliamentary motion to recognize that "the Québécois form a nation within a united Canada." He was more critical of Harper's efforts to reform the Senate of Canada, arguing that any significant changes would require negotiations with the provinces. Pelletier opposed Harper's efforts to reduce Quebec's percentage of seats in the House of Commons of Canada, saying that the proposed change would go to "the heart of balance in the federation."

Pelletier also supported efforts to have Alberta's oil wealth included in a new federal–provincial funding formula. The Alberta government strongly opposed this suggestion.

After the Quebec Liberals were reduced to a minority government in 2007, Pelletier called for the Canadian government to recognize Quebec's distinctiveness in a "charter of open federalism" and to clarify its division of powers with the provinces. He later welcomed Harper's pledge for the federal government to end direct spending in areas of provincial jurisdiction.

Pelletier's approach to federal-provincial relations was often compared to former prime minister Brian Mulroney's failed Meech Lake Accord on constitutional reform. During most of his time in office, Pelletier said that the time was not right to reopen constitutional debates.

=== Minister of Aboriginal Affairs ===
Pelletier took part in negotiations with several indigenous communities during his time in government. He brought forward an agreement with Quebec's Inuit leaders in June 2003, to negotiate a new form of self-government. Four year later, he concluded an agreement in principle to create an Inuit-controlled government in the northernmost third of Quebec, answerable to the Quebec National Assembly.

Pelletier considered reopening a 2002 settlement with the Innu on the grounds that the agreement did not properly address concerns about Quebec's land and laws. He ultimately chose to accept the accord and said that he would seek to balance the rights of the Innu and non-indigenous people under its framework. He also took part in negotiations to resolve a 2004 crisis in the Mohawk community of Kanesatake, after violent confrontations that forced Grand Chief James Gabriel to leave the area.

=== Reform of democratic institutions ===
Pelletier supported the replacement of Quebec's first past the post electoral model with mixed member proportional representation. In 2006, he wrote an article in the Montreal Gazette defending the proposed new system. Three months later, he promised a bill on proportional representation before the next provincial election. In the same period, he also proposed financial incentives to political parties as a means of encouraging more female candidates and candidates from "ethnocultural minorities.".

In late 2007, Quebec's chief electoral officer issued a 400-page document that was seen as endorsing the mixed-member proportional system. Notwithstanding Pelletier's efforts, no significant changes have been introduced to Quebec's electoral system as of 2012.

=== Francophone communities in Canada ===
In a departure from previous Quebec policy, Pelletier also sought to assist francophone minority communities in the rest of Canada. In August 2003, he announced $1.7 million for community projects across the country. In late 2006, he argued that continued support was necessary to prevent the assimilation of these communities into the English-speaking majority.

=== Other ===
Pelletier opposed Parti Québécois leader Pauline Marois's 2007 proposal that all new immigrants to Quebec be required to have a working knowledge of French before becoming citizens of the province. He described the suggestion as dangerous, saying it would create a new tier of second-class citizens.

Also in 2007, Pelletier contributed to a book entitled, Reconquerir le Canada: un nouveau projet pour la nation québécoise (English: Reconquering Canada: A New Project for the Quebec Nation). The volume was intended to promote and revitalize the federalist cause in Quebec.

Pelletier served as the acting minister of Justice and Public Security in autumn 2007, when Jacques P. Dupuis underwent surgery.

== After politics ==
Pelletier did not seek re-election in 2008 and instead returned to his position at the University of Ottawa as a constitutional professor. He was frequently sought for commentary on Canadian constitutional matters. In June 2010, he called for Canadians to be more willing to discuss the constitution.

In October 2010, Pelletier published an extended essay titled, Une certaine idée du Québec. Parcours d'un fédéraliste. De la réflexion à l'action.

== Personal life and death ==
Benoît Pelletier lived in Gatineau, Quebec. He was married to Danièle Goulet (daughter of Marcel Goulet and Agathe Villeneuve) from 30 June 1990. Together, they had four children: Florence, Françoise, Jean-Christophe and Mathilde.

Pelletier died in Mexico on 30 March 2024, at the age of 64, from post COVID-19 complications.

== Awards ==
Pelletier's many accomplishments have been recognized throughout his career, with numerous titles, awards and other forms of recognition:

- Médaille du Barreau de Paris, as the year's top student in graduate law studies at the University of Ottawa.
- Award for Excellence in Teaching from the University of Ottawa.
- Selected on merit by the Canadian Who's Who.
- The Léger-Comeau Medal from the Société Nationale de l'Acadie, in recognition of his outstanding contribution to Acadia and the people of Acadia, as well as his efforts to bring Acadians and Quebecers together.
- The Medallion of the 400th Anniversary of the Foundation of Québec City, recognizing his work on behalf of that city.
- Admission to the Ordre de Gatineau as Grand Citizen.
- Commander of the Order of La Pléiade (an Order of francophonie and cultural dialogue).
- Insignia of the Ordre des francophones d'Amérique from Quebec's Conseil supérieur de la langue française. in recognition of his efforts on behalf of the expansion of the French language in North America.
- Commander of Belgium's Order of the Crown, in recognition of his contribution to strengthening the relationship between Belgium and Canada.
- Gloire de l'Escolle Medal as a graduate of Laval University, a medal awarded to graduates who have brought particular honour to the university and to their profession through their professional activities and their contributions to society.
- Advocatus Emeritus, a distinction awarded to him by the Quebec Bar in recognition of his outstanding contribution to the legal profession and its standing.
- The Boreal Prize, presented to him by the Fédération des communautés francophones et acadienne for his major support of the development of these communities.
- Commander of the l'Ordre des Palmes académiques de France.
- Award of Merit from the Outaouais Bar Association.
- Chevalier of the Ordre national du mérite de France.
- Honoris causa doctorate in law, presented by the University of Moncton.
- Received the Queen Elizabeth II Diamond Jubilee Medal (2012).
- The Gérard-Lesage Medal, presented by the Université du Québec en Outaouais for his outstanding contribution to the development of the region, the quality of life of his fellow citizens, and the institutional values of the university.
- Appointed Officer of the National Order of Quebec (OQ) (2014).
- Elected to the Royal Society of Canada, as a special member (2015).
- Appointed a Member of the Order of Canada (CM) in the 2017 Canadian honours, "for his efforts to bring about interprovincial-territorial co-operation and for his advocacy on behalf of Francophone communities."
- Winner of the Prix Acadie-Québec, awarded in recognition of considerable contribution to the creation and consolidation of Acadia-Quebec relations.
- Recipient of the Senate of Canada Sesquicentennial Medal, presented in recognition of valuable service to the nation.
- Recipient of the Medal of the Quebec Bar, which is the highest distinction awarded by this Bar.

== Electoral record ==
2007 Quebec general election: Chapleau
Party	Candidate	Votes	%	±%
Liberal	Benoît Pelletier	14,581	45.03	−17.36
Action démocratique	Jocelyn Dumais	8,071	24.92	+11.80
Parti Québécois	Edith Gendron	7,137	22.04	+0.40
Green	Roger Fleury	1,755	5.42	–
Québec solidaire	Jennifer Jean-Brice Vales	774	2.39	+1.29
Marxist–Leninist	Pierre Soublière	65	0.20	−0.21
Total valid votes		32,383	100.00	
Rejected and declined votes		362		
Turnout		32,745	61.97	+3.27
Electors on the lists		52,839		

2003 Quebec general election: Chapleau
Party	Candidate	Votes	%	±%
Liberal	Benoît Pelletier	18,774	62.39	
Parti Québécois	Sylvie Simard	6,512	21.64	
Action démocratique	Berthe Miron	3,949	13.12	
Bloc Pot	Daniel Leblanc-Poirier	402	1.34	
UFP	Jean Marois	331	1.10	–
Marxist–Leninist	Gabriel Girard-Bernier	122	0.41	
Total valid votes		30,090	100.00	
Rejected and declined votes		280		
Turnout		30,370	58.70	
Electors on the lists		51,741		

1998 Quebec general election: Chapleau
Party	Candidate	Votes	%	±%
Liberal	Benoît Pelletier	24,288	59.22	
Parti Québécois	Claude Hallé	12,600	30.72	
Action démocratique	Serge Charette	3,617	8.81	
Socialist Democracy	Julie Lavoie	281	0.69	
Natural Law	Jean-Claude Pommet	167	0.41	
Marxist–Leninist	Kim Roberge	59	0.14	
Total valid votes		41,012	100.00	
Rejected and declined votes		456		
Turnout		41,468	71.26	
Electors on the lists		58,194		
Source: Official Results, Government of Quebec
