= Sylvain Simard =

Canadian politician (born 1945)

Member of the National Assembly of Quebec for Richelieu
- In office 12 September 1994 – 2012
- Preceded by: Albert Khelfa
- Succeeded by: Élaine Zakaïb

Minister of State for Education and Employment, Minister of Education, and Minister responsible for Employment
- In office 30 January 2002 – 29 April 2003
- Preceded by: François Legault
- Succeeded by: Pierre Reid (education), Claude Béchard (employment)

President of the Treasury Board, Minister of state for Administration and the Public Service, and Minister responsible for Administration and the Public Service
- In office 8 March 2001 – 30 January 2002
- Preceded by: Jacques Léonard
- Succeeded by: Joseph Facal

Minister of Citizenship and Immigration
- In office 6 October 2000 – 8 March 2001
- Preceded by: Robert Perreault
- Succeeded by: Joseph Facal

Minister of International Relations and Minister responsible for La Francophonie (also Minister responsible for international humanitarian action after 22 January 1997)
- In office 29 January 1996 – 15 December 1998
- Preceded by: Bernard Landry
- Succeeded by: Louise Beaudoin

Minister responsible for the Outaouais
- In office 29 January 1996 – 15 December 1998
- Preceded by: Yves Blais
- Succeeded by: Joseph Facal
- In office 8 March 2001 – 29 April 2003
- Preceded by: Joseph Facal
- Succeeded by: Benoît Pelletier

President of the Mouvement National des Quebecois
- In office 1990–1994
- Preceded by: Rolland Chaussé
- Succeeded by: Louise Laurin

Vice-President of the Parti Québécois
- In office 1981–1984
- Preceded by: Louise Harel
- Succeeded by: Nadia Assimopoulos

Personal details
- Born: 26 April 1945 (age 81) Chicoutimi, Quebec, Canada
- Party: Parti Québécois
- Profession: professor
- Portfolio: Treasury Board

Sylvain Simard (born 26 April 1945) is a politician and academic based in the Canadian province of Quebec. He represented Richelieu in the National Assembly of Quebec from 1994 to 2012, and was a cabinet minister in the governments of Lucien Bouchard and Bernard Landry. Simard is a member of the Parti Québécois (PQ).

== Early life and career ==
Simard was born in Chicoutimi, Quebec. He holds a Bachelor of Arts degree in Education from the Université de Montréal (1967), a Master of Arts degree from McGill University (1970), and a Ph.D. in Comparative Literature from the University of Bordeaux in France (1975). From 1976 to 1994, he was a professor of French literature at the University of Ottawa. He completed a work entitled Mythe et reflet de la France: L'image du Canada en France in 1987, examining perceptions of Quebec in France from the time of Louis Napoleon to World War I.

Simard's brother, Christian Simard, was a Bloc Québécois member of the House of Commons of Canada from 2004 to 2006.

== PQ vice-president ==
Simard first became involved with the Parti Québécois as a regional organizer in the Outaouais. He was elected as the PQ's vice-president in 1981 and argued that the party's internal organization should receive more autonomy from the provincial PQ government of René Lévesque.

In 1982, he helped organize a street protest against Canadian prime minister Pierre Trudeau's patriation of the Canadian Constitution without Quebec's approval. Later in the same year, he requested that Elections Canada incorporate a federal wing of the PQ so that the party could run candidates in the next Canadian federal election. Some senior party members opposed this measure, which led to the creation of the Parti nationaliste du Québec. Simard also helped coordinate the PQ's bid to join the Socialist International in 1983. This was opposed by the New Democratic Party, then the leading social democratic party in the rest of Canada outside Quebec.

Simard supported electoral reform and proposed that future elections in Quebec be conducted under a system of compensatory proportional representation. He also encouraged Premier Levesque to shuffle his cabinet and staff in early 1984, arguing that some people had been in the same positions for too long. His own term as vice-president ended in 1984.

== Political activist ==
Simard was encouraged to run as a New Democratic Party candidate in the 1988 federal election, at a time when the NDP was seeking to build its support base in Quebec. He ultimately decided against running.

In the same period, Simard became involved with local politics in the Outaouais region. He was a prominent local member of the Société nationale des Québécois and opposed proposed changes to the province's Charter of the French Language. He also formed a group called the Gatineau Democratic Movement in 1987, and there was some speculation that he would run for mayor in that year's municipal election. He ultimately decided against doing so, arguing that it would be irresponsible to split the vote against incumbent Gaétan Cousineau.

Cousineau was narrowly re-elected to the mayoralty, but resigned from office in early 1988. Simard was the first declared candidate in a by-election to succeed him, running on a platform of increased democratic consultation, budget cuts that would not affect municipal salaries, and reduced taxes. He also argued that Gatineau residents should be allowed to have a referendum on a proposed cultural centre, called for all mayoral candidates to declare their financial interests, and proposed a new municipal code of ethics. On election day, he lost to Bob Labine by only 174 votes.

Simard was a PQ candidate in the 1989 provincial election, narrowly losing to Liberal Party cabinet minister Guy Rivard in the Montreal division of Rosemont.

From 1990 to 1994, Simard was president of the Mouvement National des Quebecois (MNQ). In 1991, he argued that a sovereign Quebec would try to reduce the concentration of immigrant communities in Montreal neighbourhoods. He was quoted as saying, "We can't lower the concentration [of existing communities]; the people who are here are here. But in the future . . . we will have to adjust our welcome of immigrants to our capacities to integrate them." He also argued that francophone Quebecers would need to become more accepting of immigrants and the changes they would bring to Quebec culture. At a MNQ meeting in May 1991, he said that most francophone Quebecers were "remarkably open to the necessity for and the advantages of immigration."

As MNQ president, Simard argued that francophone Quebecers were unfairly singled out by Canadian federalists for having condoned racist and xenophobic behaviour in earlier times. In the wake of a public controversy over Esther Delisle's The Traitor and the Jew, which addressed historical anti-Semitism and Quebec nationalism, Simard said, "Of course we denounce all forms of anti-Semitism and xenophobia, and we don't excuse it even fifty years later. But why should we have to respond to [...] attacks that are obviously politically motivated?" Unlike other Quebec sovereigntist groups, the MNQ under Simard's leadership sought to build links with francophone groups across Canada.

Simard called for a referendum on sovereignty in early 1992 and campaigned against the Charlottetown Accord on Canadian constitutional reform later in the same year.

== Legislator ==
=== Minister of International Relations ===
Simard was first elected to the National Assembly of Quebec for Richelieu in the 1994 provincial election, defeating Liberal incumbent Albert Khelfa. The PQ won a majority government in this election under Jacques Parizeau's leadership, and Simard entered the legislature as a government backbencher. When Lucien Bouchard succeeded Parizeau as premier of Quebec on 29 January 1996, he appointed Simard as minister of international relations and minister responsible for La Francophonie, with further responsibilities for the Outaouais region. On 22 January 1997, Simard was given additional responsibilities as minister responsible for international humanitarian action.

Soon after his appointment, Simard warned the Canadian government to consider the possibility of a violent reaction if it ever tried to partition the predominantly federalist areas from a future, sovereign Quebec. This was in response to a statement by Canadian intergovernmental affairs minister Stéphane Dion, who said that if Canada was divisible, then Quebec would be as well.

In March 1996, Simard announced that Quebec would close thirteen of its nineteen foreign delegations as a cost-saving measure. He added that Quebec representatives in some of the affected areas could operate from within Canadian embassies, promoting both Quebec trade interests and sovereignty. Canadian deputy prime minister Sheila Copps responded that Quebec representatives would "absolutely not" be allowed to promote Quebec sovereignty in Canadian facilities, and Simard's plan was widely criticized in the rest of Canada.

Simard took part in a bid for Quebec to receive special status at the United Nations in 1997. This was defeated by the Canadian government. Later in the same year, he quarreled with federal politicians over the terms of a child-support agreement between Quebec and France; the Canadian government argued that some sections of the deal came close to defining Quebec as a sovereign country. Simard also threatened a boycott of the 2001 Francophone Games in Ottawa and Hull, on the grounds that the federal government was excluding Quebec from the organizing committee.

As minister of international relations, Simard represented Quebec in trade and diplomatic missions to France, China, Vietnam, Senegal, Côte d'Ivoire, Israel, Palestine, Lebanon, and Zimbabwe. He was skeptical of the Multilateral Agreement on Investment and encouraged Canada to withdraw from negotiations around the accord in October 1998.

In late November 1996, Simard criticized Charles Aznavour after the well-known troubadour sang some of his best-known songs in English during a concert in Ottawa. The minister was quoted as saying, "Charles Aznavour is a French singer and when he comes here he should sing in French. It shows a complete ignorance of the reality and sensibilities of Quebec society — it's a provocation."

Simard was re-elected in the 1998 Quebec election, but was dropped from cabinet on 15 December 1998. In 2000, he co-authored a procedural review document recommending that elected representatives be given more opportunities to consider and scrutinize proposed legislation.

=== Minister of Citizenship and Immigration ===
Simard rejoined Lucien Bouchard's cabinet on 6 October 2000, as the minister of citizenship and immigration. Soon after his appointment, he announced that Quebec would increase its annual immigration rate from 30,000 to a figure between 40,000 and 45,000 by 2003, while also raising its rate of francophone immigration from 44% to 52%. Echoing his statements from a decade earlier, he called for an increased settlement of immigrants into areas outside of Montreal to facilitate their integration to Quebec society. In March 2001, he announced that the numbers of both educated and francophone immigrants to Quebec were increasing and that the province would look to the Maghreb for more francophone immigration in upcoming years.

In late 2000, Simard said that he would not serve alongside Yves Michaud, a candidate for the PQ nomination in an upcoming Montreal by-election. Michaud had characterized Jewish support for the Canadian federalist option in the 1995 Quebec referendum as an "ethnic vote against the sovereignty of the Quebec people" and described B'nai Brith Canada as "anti-sovereigntist extremists." He was also quoted as saying that Jews believed themselves to be "the only people in the world who have suffered." Simard described Michaud's comments as "an old anti-Semitic throwback that leave me no choice but to condemn." Michaud, in turn, contended that he was "falsely demonized" by the reporting of his comments and was not anti-Semitic. This controversy exposed divisions in the ranks of the PQ and is widely believed to have provoked Lucien Bouchard's resignation as premier shortly thereafter.

=== President of the Treasury Board ===
When Bouchard resigned from office in early 2001, Simard supported Bernard Landry's successful bid to become the party's new leader. Landry was sworn in as premier on 8 March 2001, and reassigned Simard as president of the treasury board, minister of state for administration and the public service, minister responsible for administration and the public service, and minister responsible for the Outaouais.

Simard issued his first report as treasury board president on 29 March 2001, indicating that government spending would increase by 3.1% in 2001-02 with three-quarters of the new revenues going to health and education. He added that spending as a percentage of gross domestic product would decline, as it had in previous years. Later in 2001, he announced that Quebec would take nearly one billion dollars from its reserve fund to avoid going into deficit amid a serious North American economic downturn. In November 2001, Simard launched a $220 million initiative to ensure pay equity.

Simard launched a major recruitment campaign in early 2001, seeking to fill 1,500 full-time and 5,000 part-time public service positions. This was described as the department's most important outreach program in twenty years. In making the announcement, Simard indicated that minority groups, including anglophones and youth, would receive fair representation.

Simard also served on a cabinet committee overseeing strategies for Quebec's asbestos sector in this period.

=== Minister of Education ===
Bernard Landry shuffled his cabinet on 30 January 2002, and reassigned Simard as minister of state for education and employment, minister of education, minister responsible for employment, and minister responsible for the Outaouais. Simard delivered an education policy statement in March 2002, in which he promised to maintain Quebec's longstanding freeze on university tuition rates and remove a legislative loophole that allowed non-anglophone parents to send their children to English public schools after one year at an English private school.

He announced a $91 million program for reforming Quebec's secondary schools in January 2003, highlighted by increased tutoring, a focus on history and the French language as well as upgrades to the sciences, and new steps to target the provincial dropout rate. He introduced another plan in the same month to counter schoolyard harassment and intimidation. He was strongly critical of the right-wing Action démocratique du Québec's proposal to introduce a system of school vouchers to the province.

Simard was one of the few ministers in the Landry government with a strong interest in promoting Quebec sovereignty. In February 2003, he argued that Quebec would receive an additional $800 million in education spending if the "fiscal imbalance" between Quebec and the Canadian federal government was fixed.

=== Opposition member ===
The Liberal Party under Jean Charest defeated the PQ in the 2003 provincial election. Simard was re-elected in Richelieu by a reduced margin and served as opposition critic for the treasury board and public service. He was named as the PQ's chief organizer in October 2004. Simard was strongly critical of the Charest government's cuts to economic development and the public service, as well as its move toward public-private partnerships. In 2006, he brought forward a private member's bill to create a pension benefits guarantee fund.

Simard called for a public inquiry into federalist spending practices during the 1995 referendum on sovereignty in 2005, following statements by a high-ranking Liberal Party of Canada organizer that the federalist side had "violated" and "flouted" Quebec's election laws. Simard was quoted as saying, "We don't want to rewrite the past. What is done is done. What we need are new ground rules and the means to ensure that that this doesn't happen again."

Simard supported Bernard Landry's bid to retain the PQ leadership after the 2003 election, but nonetheless helped Landry reach his decision to resign after receiving only 76 per cent support at the party's June 2005 convention. Later in the same year, Simard supported André Boisclair's successful bid to succeed Landry as party leader.

Simard suggested lifting Quebec's tuition freeze in 2006, arguing that it had created a state of "perpetual underfunding" for universities. The PQ's youth wing opposed this suggestion, and a subsequent policy workshop reaffirmed the party's support for the freeze.

The PQ fell to a third-place finish in the 2007 general election, and Simard was again re-elected by a reduced margin over a strong challenge from an ADQ candidate. Following the election, he was one of the few PQ MNAs who still supported Boisclair's leadership. When Boisclair resigned, Simard planned to support Gilles Duceppe's bid to lead the party. Duceppe ultimately decided not to run, and Pauline Marois was chosen as Boisclair's successor.

The PQ returned to official opposition status in the 2008 election under Marois's leadership, and Sylvain was re-elected by an increased margin. He was re-appointed as critic for the treasury board and public service after the election. In March 2009, he argued that the government could save four billion dollars by building two new university teaching hospitals in Montreal as conventional projects rather than as private-public partnerships. The following year, he accused the Charest government of falsifying cost estimates to favour the public-private approach.

In early 2011, Pauline Marois said that she favoured extending Quebec's Charter of the French Language to restrict non-anglophone students from attending English-language CEGEPs. Simard openly disagreed with this policy approach, which was approved by delegates to a PQ convention in April 2011.

In May 2011, Simard introduced a private member's bill to protect whistleblowers in the Quebec civil service.

In June 2012 he announced that he would not run for re-election.

== Electoral record ==
2008 Quebec general election: Richelieu
Party	Candidate	Votes	%	±%
Parti Québécois	Sylvain Simard	11,591	46.99	+8.96
Liberal	Christian Cournoyer	8,552	34.67	+10.43
Action démocratique	Patrick Fournier	3,126	12.67	−18.70
Québec solidaire	Paul Martin	705	2.86	+0.27
Green	Patrick Lamothe	693	2.81	−0.48
Total valid votes		24,667	100.00	
Rejected and declined votes		554		
Turnout		25,221	61.75	−13.36
Electors on the lists		40,842		
Parti Québécois hold		Swing		−0.73
Source: Official Results, Le Directeur général des élections du Québec.

2007 Quebec general election: Richelieu
Party	Candidate	Votes	%	±%
Parti Québécois	Sylvain Simard	11,411	38.03	−8.33
Action démocratique	Philippe Rochat	9,413	31.37	+18.26
Liberal	Gilles Salvas	7,275	24.24	−13.89
Green	François Desmarais	986	3.29	–
Québec solidaire	Éric Noël	778	2.59	
Independent	Normand Philibert	145	0.48	
Total valid votes		30,008	100.00	
Rejected and declined votes		389		
Turnout		30,397	75.11	+2.18
Electors on the lists		40,468		
Parti Québécois hold		Swing		−13.30
Source: Official Results, Le Directeur général des élections du Québec.

2003 Quebec general election: Richelieu
Party	Candidate	Votes	%	±%
Parti Québécois	Sylvain Simard	13,286	46.36	−9.95
Liberal	Benoît Lefebvre	10,927	38.13	+10.46
Action démocratique	Micheline Ulrich	3,756	13.11	−1.31
Bloc Pot	Marie-Hélène Charbonneau	407	1.42	
Independent	Nidal Joad	109	0.38	
Independent	Steve Ritter	100	0.35	
Christian Democracy	Florette Villemure Larochelle	74	0.26	
Total valid votes		28,659	100.00	
Rejected and declined votes		484		
Turnout		29,143	72.93	
Electors on the lists		39,961		
Parti Québécois hold		Swing		−10.21
Source: Official Results, Le Directeur général des élections du Québec.

1998 Quebec general election: Richelieu
Party	Candidate	Votes	%	±%
Parti Québécois	Sylvain Simard	17,745	56.31	+1.22
Liberal	Gilles Ferlatte	8,718	27.66	−12.22
Action démocratique	Patrick Gauthier	4,543	14.42	
Independent	Michel Groleau	261	0.83	
Socialist Democracy	Isabelle Latour	246	0.78	
Total valid votes		31,513	100.00	
Rejected and declined votes		689		
Turnout		32,202	80.99	−2.24
Electors on the lists		39,762		
Parti Québécois hold		Swing		+6.72
Source: Official Results, Le Directeur général des élections du Québec.

1994 Quebec general election: Richelieu
Party	Candidate	Votes	%	±%
Parti Québécois	Sylvain Simard	17,186	55.09	+12.84
Liberal	Albert Khelfa	12,441	39.88	−13.49
Independent	Marcel Cloutier	1,570	5.03	
Total valid votes		31,197	100.00	
Rejected and declined votes		1,003		
Turnout		32,200	83.23	+3.42
Electors on the lists		38,688		
Source: Official Results, Le Directeur général des élections du Québec.

1989 Quebec general election: Rosemont
Party	Candidate	Votes	%
Liberal	Guy Rivard (incumbent)	13,121	46.97
Parti Québécois	Sylvain Simard	12,988	46.50
New Democratic	Pierre Dion	620	2.22
Progressive Conservative	Lyse T. Giguère	298	1.07
Parti indépendantiste	Richard Belleau	278	1.00
Workers	Régis Beaulieu	256	0.92
Commonwealth of Canada	Normand Bélanger	134	0.48
United Social Credit	Jean-Paul Poulin	92	0.33
Marxist–Leninist	France Tremblay	79	0.28
Socialist Movement	Jean-Yves Desgagnés	67	0.24
Total valid votes		27,933	
Rejected and declined votes		862	
Turnout		28,795	75.65
Electors on the lists		38,064	
Source: Official Results, Le Directeur général des élections du Québec.

1988 Gatineau mayoral by-election Resignation of Gaétan Cousineau
Party	Candidate	Popular vote			Expenditures
Party	Candidate	Votes	%	±%	Expenditures
Independent	Robert Labine	9,150	37.98	–	none listed
Independent	Sylvain Simard	8,976	37.26	–	none listed
Independent	Jean Deschênes	4,947	20.53	–	none listed
Independent	Hubert Leroux	1,018	4.23	–	none listed
Total valid votes		24,091	99.10		
Total rejected, unmarked and declined votes		219	0.90	–	
Turnout		24,310	44.63	–	
Eligible voters		54,470			
Note: Candidate campaign colours, unless a member of a party, are based on the prominent colour used in campaign items (signs, literature, etc.) or colours used in polling graphs and are used as a visual differentiation between candidates.
Sources: Ville de Gatineau Archives and Ottawa Citizen
