= Élaine Zakaïb =

Canadian politician

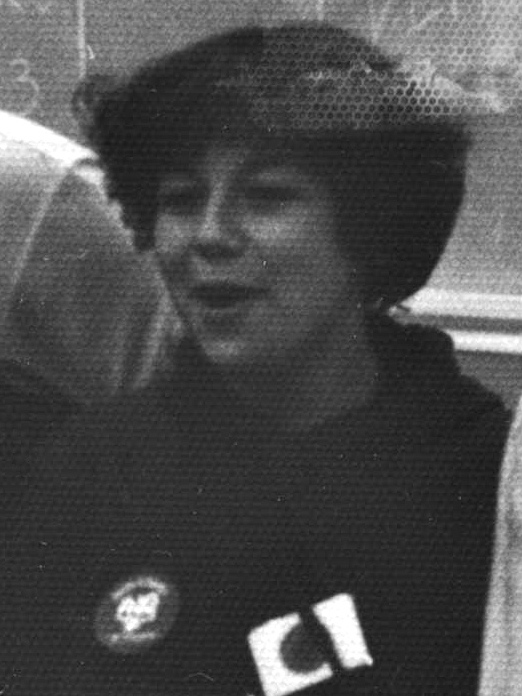

Member of the National Assembly of Quebec for Richelieu
- In office September 4, 2012 – September 29, 2014
- Preceded by: Sylvain Simard
- Succeeded by: Sylvain Rochon

Personal details
- Born: July 9, 1959 Sorel-Tracy, Quebec
- Died: October 1, 2018 (aged 59) Sorel-Tracy, Quebec
- Cause of death: Brain cancer
- Party: Parti Québécois

Élaine Zakaïb (July 9, 1959 – October 1, 2018) was a Canadian politician. She was member of the National Assembly of Quebec for the riding of Richelieu, first elected in the 2012 election and re-elected in 2014.

Zakaïb was Minister Delegate for Industrial Policy and the Quebec Economic Development Bank in the government of Pauline Marois.

Born in Sorel-Tracy, Quebec on July 9, 1959, Zakaïb was an associate at Feldman & Associés from 1984 to 1992, and a lawyer for the Jacob clothing retailer in 1987.

On September 29, 2014, she resigned her seat to return to the Jacob women's clothing retailer as chief of restructuring and vice-president of strategy.

Zakaïb died on October 1, 2018, of brain cancer.
