= Jean-Bernard Émond =

Canadian politician

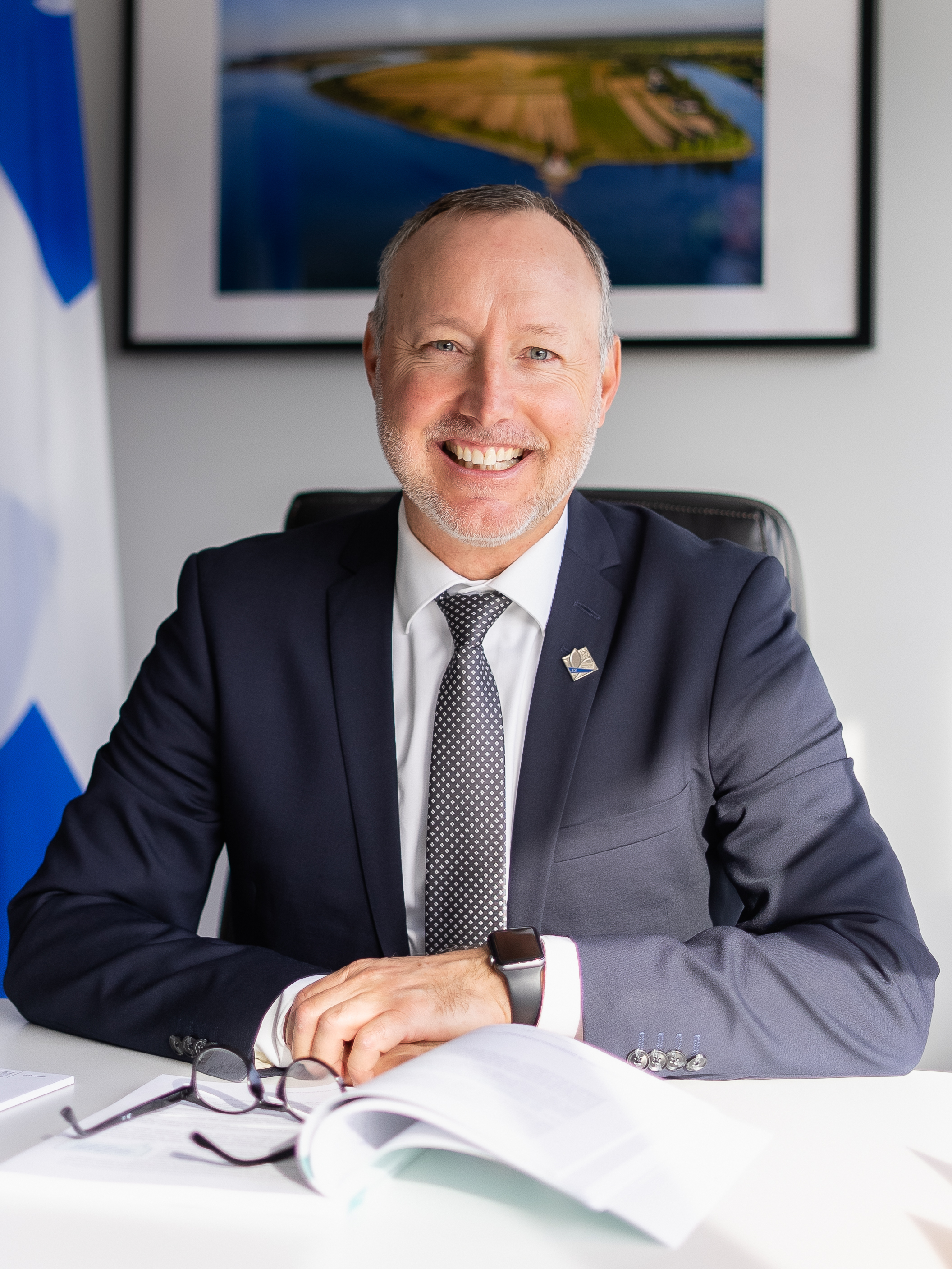

Member of the National Assembly of Quebec for Richelieu
- In office October 1, 2018 – October 5, 2026
- Preceded by: Sylvain Rochon
- Succeeded by: Jocelyn Desjardins

Personal details
- Born: 1968 Sainte-Anne-de-Sorel, Quebec
- Party: Coalition Avenir Québec
- Occupation: Businessman

Jean-Bernard Émond is a Canadian politician, who was elected to the National Assembly of Quebec in the 2018 provincial election. He represented the electoral district of Richelieu as a member of the Coalition Avenir Québec. Emond is a businessman who co-managed a family printing company in Sorel-Tracy. He is a founding member of the Coalition Avenir Québec.

His brother Pierre-André Émond was the Conservative Party of Canada candidate for the 2019 federal election in the riding of Bécancour—Nicolet—Saurel, which overlaps his provincial riding of Richelieu.

== Electoral record ==
2026 Quebec general election: Richelieu
** Preliminary results — Not yet official **
Party	Candidate	Votes	%	±%
Parti Québécois	Jocelyn Desjardins	15,074	41.26	
Coalition Avenir Québec	Jean-Bernard Émond	7,852	21.49	
Conservative	Christian Blouin	6,704	18.35	
Liberal	Gilles Delorme	3,916	10.72	
Québec solidaire	Julien Bergeron	2,482	6.79	
Climat Québec	Martin Larivière	352	0.96	
Démocratie directe	Jean-Louis Raymond	155	0.42	
Total valid votes				
Total rejected ballots				
Turnout			68.78	
Electors on the lists				
Parti Québécois gain from Coalition Avenir Québec		Swing		+
Source: Élections Québec

2022 Quebec general election: Richelieu
Party	Candidate	Votes	%	±%
Coalition Avenir Québec	Jean-Bernard Émond	17,098	55.89	+6.10
Parti Québécois	Gabriel Arpin	6,204	20.28	-2.77
Québec solidaire	David Dionne	3,084	10.08	-3.30
Conservative	Marie-Ève Dionne	2,697	8.82	+7.63
Liberal	Anthony Sauriol	1,262	4.13	-7.15
Climat Québec	Alejandra Velasquez	165	0.54	–
Démocratie directe	André Blanchette	82	0.27	–
Total valid votes		30,592	98.54	–
Total rejected ballots		453	1.46	-0.44
Turnout		31,045	67.81	-2.62
Electors on the lists		45,782	–	–
Coalition Avenir Québec hold		Swing		+4.43

2018 Quebec general election: Richelieu
Party	Candidate	Votes	%	±%
Coalition Avenir Québec	Jean-Bernard Émond	15,258	49.79	+17.3
Parti Québécois	Sylvain Rochon	7,062	23.05	-12.94
Québec solidaire	Sophie Pagé Sabourin	4,101	13.38	+10.71
Liberal	Sophie Chevalier	3,456	11.28	-13.66
Green	Ksenia Svetoushkina	402	1.31	-0.43
Conservative	Patrick Corriveau	364	1.19	+0.72
Total valid votes		30,643	98.10	
Total rejected ballots		592	1.90	
Turnout		31,235	70.43	
Eligible voters		44,346		
Coalition Avenir Québec gain from Parti Québécois		Swing		+15.12
Source(s) "Rapport des résultats officiels du scrutin". Élections Québec.
