= Louis-Pierre-Paul Cardin =

Canadian politician

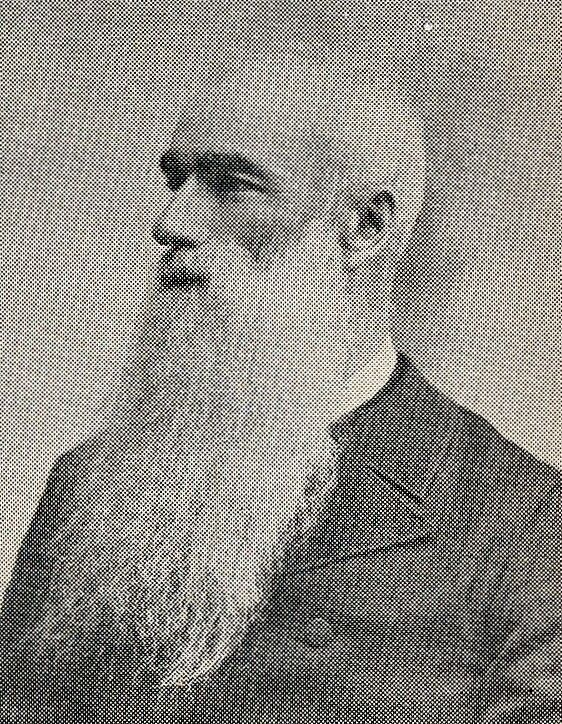

Member of the Legislative Assembly of Quebec for Richelieu
- In office 1886–1892
- Preceded by: Léon Leduc
- Succeeded by: Louis Lacouture

Personal details
- Born: May 21, 1840 Saint-Pierre-de-Sorel, Lower Canada
- Died: April 9, 1917 (aged 76) Montreal, Quebec
- Party: Liberal

Louis-Pierre-Paul Cardin (May 21, 1840 – April 9, 1917) was a notary and political figure in Quebec. He represented Richelieu in the Legislative Assembly of Quebec from 1886 to 1892 and from 1897 to 1912 as a Liberal.

He was born in Saint-Pierre-de-Sorel, Lower Canada, the son of Athanase Cardin and Judith Lavallée, and was educated at the Collège de l'Assomption. In 1867, he married Marie-Eugénie-Célina Lamère. Cardin qualified to practise in 1868 and set up practice in Sorel. He was secretary-treasurer for Sainte-Anne-de-Sorel from 1878 to 1879 and Sainte-Victoire from 1880 to 1886. Cardin was also president and secretary-treasurer for the agricultural society for Richelieu County. Cardin was also president for the Saint-Jean-Baptiste Society at Sorel. Cardin established a militia company at Sorel and served as captain and then lieutenant-colonel. He served as associate prothonotary for Montreal district from 1912 until his death in Montréal at the age of 76.
