= Vaive =

Vaive is a surname. Notable people with the surname include:

- Claire Vaive (born 1940), Canadian politician
- Justin Vaive (born 1989), American ice hockey player
- Rick Vaive (born 1959), Canadian ice hockey player

== See also ==
- Vaive parish, parish of Cēsis district, Latvia
