= Sylvain Rochon =

Canadian politician

Member of the National Assembly of Quebec for Richelieu
- In office March 9, 2015 – August 29, 2018
- Preceded by: Élaine Zakaïb
- Succeeded by: Jean-Bernard Émond

Personal details
- Party: Parti Québécois

Sylvain Rochon is a Canadian politician, who was elected to the National Assembly of Quebec in a by-election on March 9, 2015. He represented the electoral district of Richelieu as a member of the Parti Québécois until 2018.

Prior to his election to the legislature, Rochon worked as a journalist for local radio station CJSO-FM, and as a political assistant to both Élaine Zakaïb, his predecessor as MNA for Richelieu, and Zakaïb's predecessor Sylvain Simard.

== Electoral record ==
Quebec provincial by-election, March 9, 2015
Party	Candidate	Votes	%	±%
Parti Québécois	Sylvain Rochon	7,294	35.98	-3.04
Coalition Avenir Québec	Jean-Bernard Émond	6,584	32.48	+5.66
Liberal	Benoît Théroux	5,054	24.93	-0.72
Québec solidaire	Marie-Ève Mathieu	541	2.67	-2.63
Option nationale	Sol Zanetti	316	1.56	+0.21
Green	Vincent Pouliot	352	1.74	+0.58
Conservative	Daniel Gaudreau	103	0.51	-0.21
Équipe Autonomiste	Louis Chandonnet	30	0.15	
Total valid votes		20,274	98.45	+1.00
Total rejected ballots		319	1.55	-1.00
Turnout		20,593	46.43	-23.57
Electors on the lists		44,356	–	–
Parti Québécois hold		Swing		-4.35
