= Maurice Martel =

Canadian politician (1936–2015)

Maurice Martel (29 October 1936 – 1 December 2015) was a Canadian politician in the province of Quebec. He served in the National Assembly of Quebec from 1966 to 1970 and again from 1976 to 1985, and was a cabinet minister in the governments of René Lévesque and Pierre-Marc Johnson.

== Early life and career ==
Maurice Martel was born in Quebec City on 29 October 1936. He studied pharmaceutical sciences at the University of Montreal, receiving certification in 1963. In the same year, he opened a drugstore in Sorel. He also worked as a news editor for the weekly journal, La Voix métropolitaine. Martel was politically active in his youth, serving as president of the Union Nationale's university students organization in 1962.

== Political career ==
Martel was first elected to the Quebec legislature in the 1966 provincial election, scoring an upset victory over Liberal cabinet minister Gérard Cournoyer in Richelieu. The Union Nationale won a majority government in this election under Daniel Johnson's leadership, and Martel served for the next four years as a government backbencher. On December 23, 1969, and was appointed as parliamentary assistant to the Minister of Social Affairs. He was defeated by Claude Simard when the Liberals were returned to office in the 1970 provincial election.

The Union Nationale organization declined in the 1970s, and Martel joined the Parti Québécois in 1974. He was returned to the National Assembly in the 1976 election as the PQ formed its first majority government under René Lévesque. He served again as parliamentary assistant to the Minister of Social Affairs from 1976 to 1979, and later served as assistant to the Minister of Public Works and Supply (1979–1984) and the Minister of External Trade (1984).

Cabinet minister

Martel was appointed to Levesque's cabinet as Minister of Revenue on December 20, 1984, as part of a larger shuffle that some believed was intended as an appeal to small-town Quebec. In April 1985, he announced that the Quebec Lottery and Racing Board would be authorized to license arcades and conduct criminal background checks on their owners. He was retained as Revenue Minister when Pierre-Marc Johnson succeeded Levesque as Premier of Quebec in 1985, but was defeated by Liberal candidate Albert Khelfa in the 1985 provincial election as the Liberals were again returned to office. He formally stepped down from cabinet with the rest of the Johnson administration on December 12, 1985.

== After politics ==
Martel returned to his pharmacy practice after leaving political life. In 1991, he was president of Sorel's 350th anniversary celebrations. He died on 1 December 2015, at the age of 79.

== Electoral record ==
1985 Quebec general election: Richelieu
Party	Candidate	Votes	%	±%
Liberal	Albert Khelfa	16,373	53.14	+13.01
Parti Québécois	Maurice Martel	13,326	43.25	−12.81
New Democratic	Guy Verville	587	1.91	
Independent	Michel Guilbault	347	1.13	
Christian Socialist	Diane Dufour	105	0.34	
Commonwealth of Canada	Jean-Paul Belley	72	0.23	
Total valid votes		30,810		
Rejected and declined votes		585		
Turnout		31,395	81.90	−3.95
Electors on the lists		38,335		

1981 Quebec general election: Richelieu
Party	Candidate	Votes	%	±%
Parti Québécois	Maurice Martel	18,198	56.06	
Liberal	Jean Frappier	13,025	40.13	
Union Nationale	Julien Cordeau	1,037	3.19	–
Independent	Guy Mandeville	77	0.24	
Workers Communist	Jean-Paul Cadorette	72	0.22	
Marxist–Leninist	Mario Bellavance	50	0.15	
Total valid votes		32,459	100.00	
Rejected and declined votes		328		
Turnout		32,787	85.85	
Electors on the lists		38,189		

1976 Quebec general election: Richelieu
Party	Candidate	Votes	%	±%
Parti Québécois	Maurice Martel	16,141	51.98	
Liberal	Jean Cournoyer	11,867	38.22	
Union Nationale	Camille Vertefeuille	2,189	7.05	–
Ralliement créditiste	Guy Guilbault	854	2.75	
Total valid votes		31,051	100.00	
Rejected and declined votes		399		
Turnout		31,450	90.28	
Electors on the lists		34,835		

1970 Quebec general election: Richelieu
Party	Candidate	Votes	%	±%
Liberal	Claude Simard	12,047	42.01	
Union Nationale	Maurice Martel	9,819	34.24	–
Parti Québécois	Claude Rochon	5,866	20.45	
Ralliement créditiste	Octave Grosariu	947	3.30	
Total valid votes		28,679	100.00	
Rejected and declined votes		462		
Turnout		29,141	89.02	
Electors on the lists		32,736		
Source: Rapport du président général des élections, Élections 1970.

1966 Quebec general election: Richelieu
Party	Candidate	Votes	%	±%
Union Nationale	Maurice Martel	12,257	49.43	–
Liberal	Gérard Cournoyer	11,177	45.08	
RIN	Normand Heon	1,221	4.92	
Ralliement national	Lorenzo Bonneau	141	0.57	
Total valid votes		24,796	100.00	
Rejected, unmarked and declined ballots		379		
Turnout		25,175	84.76	
Electors on the lists		29,702		
Source: Rapport du président général des élections (Quebec), Élections 1966.
