= Richelieu (provincial electoral district) =

Provincial electoral district in Quebec, Canada

Coordinates: 45.915°N 72.947°W

Quebec electoral district

Provincial electoral district
- Legislature: National Assembly of Quebec
MNA
Jocelyn Desjardins
Parti Québécois
- District created: 1867
- District abolished: 1939
- District re-created: 1944
- First contested: 1867, 1944
- Last contested: 1939, 2026

Demographics
- Population (2011): 53,975
- Electors (2014): 44,201
- Area (km²): 880.7
- Pop. density (per km²): 61.3
- Census division(s): Pierre-De Saurel, Les Maskoutains
- Census subdivision(s): Massueville, Saint-Aimé, Sainte-Anne-de-Sorel, Saint-Bernard-de-Michaudville, Saint-David, Saint-Gérard-Majella, Saint-Joseph-de-Sorel, Saint-Jude, Saint-Louis, Saint-Marcel-de-Richelieu, Saint-Ours, Saint-Robert, Saint-Roch-de-Richelieu, Sainte-Victoire-de-Sorel, Sorel-Tracy, Yamaska

Richelieu (French: [ʁiʃ(ə)ljø]) is a provincial electoral district in the Montérégie region of Quebec, Canada, which elects members to the National Assembly of Quebec. It notably includes the municipalities of Sorel-Tracy, Sainte-Anne-de-Sorel, Saint-Roch-de-Richelieu, and Sainte-Victoire-de-Sorel.

It was created for the 1867 election (and an electoral district of that name existed earlier in the Legislative Assembly of the Province of Canada and the Legislative Assembly of Lower Canada). Its final election was in 1936. It disappeared in the 1939 election and its successor electoral district was Richelieu-Verchères.

However, Richelieu-Verchères disappeared in the 1944 election and its successor electoral district was the re-created Richelieu.

In the change from the 2001 to the 2011 electoral map, it gained territory from Nicolet-Yamaska and from Verchères electoral districts.

It is named after former French Cardinal Armand Jean du Plessis de Richelieu.

== Members of the Legislative Assembly / National Assembly ==
Legislature	Years	Member	Party
1st	1867–1869†	Joseph Beaudreau	Conservative
1st	1869–1871	Pierre Gélinas	Conservative
2nd	1871–1875	Joseph Adolphe Dorion	Conservative
3rd	1875–1878	Michel Mathieu	Conservative
4th	1878–1881	Michel Mathieu	Conservative
5th	1881–1886	Léon Leduc	Conservative
6th	1886–1890	Louis-Pierre-Paul Cardin	Liberal
7th	1890–1892	Louis-Pierre-Paul Cardin	Liberal
8th	1892–1897	Louis Lacouture	Conservative
9th	1897–1900	Louis-Pierre-Paul Cardin	Liberal
10th	1900–1904	Louis-Pierre-Paul Cardin	Liberal
11th	1904–1908	Louis-Pierre-Paul Cardin	Liberal
12th	1908–1912	Louis-Pierre-Paul Cardin	Liberal
13th	1912–1916	Maurice-Louis Péloquin	Liberal
14th	1916–1919	Maurice-Louis Péloquin	Liberal
15th	1919–1923	Maurice-Louis Péloquin	Liberal
16th	1923–1927	Jean-Baptiste Lafrenière	Liberal
17th	1927–1929	Jean-Baptiste Lafrenière	Liberal
17th	1929–1931	Avila Turcotte	Liberal
18th	1931–1935	Avila Turcotte	Liberal
19th	1935–1936	Avila Turcotte	Liberal
20th	1936–1939	Avila Turcotte	Liberal
Riding dissolved into Richelieu-Verchères
Riding re-created from Richelieu-Verchères
22nd	1944–1948	Joseph-Willie Robidoux	Liberal
23rd	1948–1952	Bernard Gagné	Union Nationale
24th	1952–1956	Gérard Cournoyer	Liberal
25th	1956–1960	Bernard Gagné	Union Nationale
26th	1960–1962	Gérard Cournoyer	Liberal
27th	1962–1966	Gérard Cournoyer	Liberal
28th	1966–1970	Maurice Martel	Union Nationale
29th	1970–1973	Claude Simard	Liberal
30th	1973–1976	Claude Simard	Liberal
31st	1976–1981	Maurice Martel	Parti Québécois
32nd	1981–1985	Maurice Martel	Parti Québécois
33rd	1985–1989	Albert Khelfa	Liberal
34th	1989–1994	Albert Khelfa	Liberal
35th	1994–1998	Sylvain Simard	Parti Québécois
36th	1998–2003	Sylvain Simard	Parti Québécois
37th	2003–2007	Sylvain Simard	Parti Québécois
38th	2007–2008	Sylvain Simard	Parti Québécois
39th	2008–2012	Sylvain Simard	Parti Québécois
40th	2012–2014	Élaine Zakaïb	Parti Québécois
41st	2014–2014	Élaine Zakaïb	Parti Québécois
41st	2015–2018	Sylvain Rochon	Parti Québécois
42nd	2018–2022	Jean-Bernard Émond	Coalition Avenir Québec
43rd	2022–2026	Jean-Bernard Émond	Coalition Avenir Québec
44th	2026–Present	Jocelyn Desjardins	Parti Québécois

== Election results ==
2026 Quebec general election
** Preliminary results — Not yet official **
Party	Candidate	Votes	%	±%
Parti Québécois	Jocelyn Desjardins	15,074	41.26	
Coalition Avenir Québec	Jean-Bernard Émond	7,852	21.49	
Conservative	Christian Blouin	6,704	18.35	
Liberal	Gilles Delorme	3,916	10.72	
Québec solidaire	Julien Bergeron	2,482	6.79	
Climat Québec	Martin Larivière	352	0.96	
Démocratie directe	Jean-Louis Raymond	155	0.42	
Total valid votes				
Total rejected ballots				
Turnout			68.78	
Electors on the lists				
Parti Québécois gain from Coalition Avenir Québec		Swing		+
Source: Élections Québec

2022 Quebec general election
Party	Candidate	Votes	%	±%
Coalition Avenir Québec	Jean-Bernard Émond	17,098	55.89	+6.10
Parti Québécois	Gabriel Arpin	6,204	20.28	-2.77
Québec solidaire	David Dionne	3,084	10.08	-3.30
Conservative	Marie-Ève Dionne	2,697	8.82	+7.63
Liberal	Anthony Sauriol	1,262	4.13	-7.15
Climat Québec	Alejandra Velasquez	165	0.54	–
Démocratie directe	André Blanchette	82	0.27	–
Total valid votes		30,592	98.54	–
Total rejected ballots		453	1.46	-0.44
Turnout		31,045	67.81	-2.62
Electors on the lists		45,782	–	–
Coalition Avenir Québec hold		Swing		+4.43

2018 Quebec general election
Party	Candidate	Votes	%	±%
Coalition Avenir Québec	Jean-Bernard Émond	15,258	49.79	+17.3
Parti Québécois	Sylvain Rochon	7,062	23.05	-12.94
Québec solidaire	Sophie Pagé Sabourin	4,101	13.38	+10.71
Liberal	Sophie Chevalier	3,456	11.28	-13.66
Green	Ksenia Svetoushkina	402	1.31	-0.43
Conservative	Patrick Corriveau	364	1.19	+0.72
Total valid votes		30,643	98.10	
Total rejected ballots		592	1.90	
Turnout		31,235	70.43	
Eligible voters		44,346		
Coalition Avenir Québec gain from Parti Québécois		Swing		+15.12
Source(s) "Rapport des résultats officiels du scrutin". Élections Québec.

Quebec provincial by-election, March 9, 2015
Party	Candidate	Votes	%	±%
Parti Québécois	Sylvain Rochon	7,294	35.99	-3.03
Coalition Avenir Québec	Jean-Bernard Émond	6,584	32.49	+5.68
Liberal	Benoît Théroux	5,054	24.94	-0.71
Québec solidaire	Marie-Ève Mathieu	541	2.67	-2.63
Green	Vincent Pouliot	352	1.74	+0.59
Option nationale	Sol Zanetti	316	1.56	+0.22
Conservative	Daniel Gaudreau	95	0.47	-0.25
Équipe Autonomiste	Louis Chandonnet	30	0.15	–
Total valid votes		20,266	98.46	+1.01
Total rejected ballots		318	1.54	-0.99
Turnout		20,584	46.41	-23.17
Electors on the lists		44,356	–	–
Parti Québécois hold		Swing		-4.35

2014 Quebec general election
Party	Candidate	Votes	%	±%
Parti Québécois	Élaine Zakaïb	11,695	39.02	-4.03
Coalition Avenir Québec	Martin Baller	8,036	26.81	-5.52
Liberal	Alain Plante	7,687	25.65	+7.42
Québec solidaire	Marie-Ève Mathieu	1,589	5.30	+2.08
Option nationale	Jean-François Tremblay	403	1.34	-1.82
Green	Claude Bourgault	346	1.15	–
Conservative	Marc Gaudet	215	0.72	–
Total valid votes		29,971	97.45	–
Total rejected ballots		785	2.55	–
Turnout		30,756	69.58	-8.11
Electors on the lists		44,201	–	–
Parti Québécois hold		Swing		+0.75

2012 Quebec general election
Party	Candidate	Votes	%	±%
Parti Québécois	Élaine Zakaïb	14,474	43.05	-5.81
Coalition Avenir Québec	Jean-Bernard Émond	10,873	32.34	+19.58
Liberal	Alain Plante	6,128	18.23	-14.82
Québec solidaire	Marie-Ève Mathieu	1,084	3.22	+0.50
Option nationale	Michaël Rocheleau	1,065	3.17	
Total valid votes		33,624	98.16	–
Total rejected ballots		629	1.84	–
Turnout		34,253	77.69	+15.94
Electors on the lists		44,088	–	–
Parti Québécois hold		Swing		-12.69

^ Change is from redistributed results. CAQ change is from ADQ.

2008 Quebec general election
Party	Candidate	Votes	%	±%
Parti Québécois	Sylvain Simard	11,591	46.99	+8.96
Liberal	Christian Cournoyer	8,552	34.67	+10.43
Action démocratique	Patrick Fournier	3,126	12.67	−18.70
Québec solidaire	Paul Martin	705	2.86	+0.27
Green	Patrick Lamothe	693	2.81	−0.48
Total valid votes		24,667	100.00	
Rejected and declined votes		554		
Turnout		25,221	61.75	−13.36
Electors on the lists		40,842		
Parti Québécois hold		Swing		−0.73
Source: Official Results, Le Directeur général des élections du Québec.

2007 Quebec general election
Party	Candidate	Votes	%	±%
Parti Québécois	Sylvain Simard	11,411	38.03	−8.33
Action démocratique	Philippe Rochat	9,413	31.37	+18.26
Liberal	Gilles Salvas	7,275	24.24	−13.89
Green	François Desmarais	986	3.29	–
Québec solidaire	Éric Noël	778	2.59	
Independent	Normand Philibert	145	0.48	
Total valid votes		30,008	100.00	
Rejected and declined votes		389		
Turnout		30,397	75.11	+2.18
Electors on the lists		40,468		
Parti Québécois hold		Swing		−13.30
Source: Official Results, Le Directeur général des élections du Québec.

2003 Quebec general election
Party	Candidate	Votes	%	±%
Parti Québécois	Sylvain Simard	13,286	46.36	−9.95
Liberal	Benoît Lefebvre	10,927	38.13	+10.46
Action démocratique	Micheline Ulrich	3,756	13.11	−1.31
Bloc Pot	Marie-Hélène Charbonneau	407	1.42	
Independent	Nidal Joad	109	0.38	
Independent	Steve Ritter	100	0.35	
Christian Democracy	Florette Villemure Larochelle	74	0.26	
Total valid votes		28,659	100.00	
Rejected and declined votes		484		
Turnout		29,143	72.93	
Electors on the lists		39,961		
Parti Québécois hold		Swing		−10.21
Source: Official Results, Le Directeur général des élections du Québec.

1998 Quebec general election
Party	Candidate	Votes	%	±%
Parti Québécois	Sylvain Simard	17,745	56.31	+1.22
Liberal	Gilles Ferlatte	8,718	27.66	−12.22
Action démocratique	Patrick Gauthier	4,543	14.42	
Independent	Michel Groleau	261	0.83	
Socialist Democracy	Isabelle Latour	246	0.78	
Total valid votes		31,513	100.00	
Rejected and declined votes		689		
Turnout		32,202	80.99	−2.24
Electors on the lists		39,762		
Parti Québécois hold		Swing		+6.72
Source: Official Results, Le Directeur général des élections du Québec.

1995 Quebec referendum
Side	Votes	%
Oui	22,490	62.32
Non	13,597	37.68

1994 Quebec general election
Party	Candidate	Votes	%	±%
Parti Québécois	Sylvain Simard	17,186	55.09	+12.84
Liberal	Albert Khelfa	12,441	39.88	−13.49
Independent	Marcel Cloutier	1,570	5.03	
Total valid votes		31,197	100.00	
Rejected and declined votes		1,003		
Turnout		32,200	83.23	+3.42
Electors on the lists		38,688		
Source: Official Results, Le Directeur général des élections du Québec.

1992 Charlottetown Accord referendum
Side	Votes	%
Non	20,521	64.07
Oui	11,510	35.93

1989 Quebec general election
Party	Candidate	Votes	%	±%
Liberal	Albert Khelfa	15,790	53.37	+0.22
Parti Québécois	Guy Savard	12,502	42.25	−1.00
Independent	Rodrigue Lemoyne	1,296	4.38	
Total valid votes		29,588	100.00	
Rejected and declined votes		1,260		
Turnout		30,848	79.81	
Electors on the lists		38,650		

1985 Quebec general election
Party	Candidate	Votes	%	±%
Liberal	Albert Khelfa	16,373	53.14	+13.01
Parti Québécois	Maurice Martel	13,326	43.25	−12.81
New Democratic	Guy Verville	587	1.91	
Independent	Michel Guilbault	347	1.13	
Christian Socialist	Diane Dufour	105	0.34	
Commonwealth of Canada	Jean-Paul Belley	72	0.23	
Total valid votes		30,810		
Rejected and declined votes		585		
Turnout		31,395	81.90	−3.95
Electors on the lists		38,335		

1981 Quebec general election
Party	Candidate	Votes	%	±%
Parti Québécois	Maurice Martel	18,198	56.06	
Liberal	Jean Frappier	13,025	40.13	
Union Nationale	Julien Cordeau	1,037	3.19	–
Independent	Guy Mandeville	77	0.24	
Workers Communist	Jean-Paul Cadorette	72	0.22	
Marxist–Leninist	Mario Bellavance	50	0.15	
Total valid votes		32,459	100.00	
Rejected and declined votes		328		
Turnout		32,787	85.85	
Electors on the lists		38,189		

1980 Quebec referendum
Side	Votes	%
Non	16,455	51.40
Oui	15,559	48.60

1976 Quebec general election
Party	Candidate	Votes	%	±%
Parti Québécois	Maurice Martel	16,141	51.98	
Liberal	Jean Cournoyer	11,867	38.22	
Union Nationale	Camille Vertefeuille	2,189	7.05	–
Ralliement créditiste	Guy Guilbault	854	2.75	
Total valid votes		31,051	100.00	
Rejected and declined votes		399		
Turnout		31,450	90.28	
Electors on the lists		34,835		

1973 Quebec general election
Party	Candidate	Votes	%
Liberal	Claude Simard	15,198	55.21
Parti Québécois	Serge Lachapelle	9,464	34.38
Parti créditiste	Édouard Frigon	2,017	7.33
Union Nationale	A.-Yvon Lamy	848	3.08
Total valid votes		27,527	98.23
Total rejected ballots		496	1.77
Turnout		28,023	87.23
Electors on the lists		32,124	

1970 Quebec general election
Party	Candidate	Votes	%
Liberal	Claude Simard	12,047	42.01
Union Nationale	Maurice Martel	9,819	34.24
Parti Québécois	Claude Rochon	5,866	20.45
Ralliement créditiste	Octave Grosariu	947	3.30
Total valid votes		28,679	98.42
Total rejected ballots		461	1.58
Turnout		29,140	89.02
Electors on the lists		32,736	

1966 Quebec general election
Party	Candidate	Votes	%
Union Nationale	Maurice Martel	12,257	49.43
Liberal	Gérard Cournoyer	11,177	45.08
RIN	Normand Héon	1,221	4.92
Ralliement national	Lorenzo Bonneau	141	0.57
Total valid votes		24,796	98.49
Total rejected ballots		379	1.51
Turnout		25,175	87.46
Electors on the lists		29,702	

1962 Quebec general election
Party	Candidate	Votes	%
Liberal	Gérard Cournoyer	10,598	55.61
Union Nationale	Bernard Gagné	8,461	44.39
Total valid votes		19,059	98.85
Total rejected ballots		222	1.15
Turnout		19,281	90.11
Electors on the lists		21,396	

1960 Quebec general election
Party	Candidate	Votes	%
Liberal	Gérard Cournoyer	9,617	52.91
Union Nationale	Bernard Gagné	8,472	46.61
Independent	Joseph-Alexandre-Hervé Larivère	46	0.25
Independent	Guy Mandeville	42	0.23
Total valid votes		18,177	98.99
Total rejected ballots		185	1.01
Turnout		18,362	88.91
Electors on the lists		20,652	

1956 Quebec general election
Party	Candidate	Votes	%
Union Nationale	Bernard Gagné	9,552	54.28
Liberal	Gérard Cournoyer	7,962	45.24
Co-operative Commonwealth	Gérard Labelle	66	0.38
Labor–Progressive	Jean-Paul Lecavalier	19	0.11
Total valid votes		17,599	99.03
Total rejected ballots		172	0.97
Turnout		17,771	89.78
Electors on the lists		19,794	

1952 Quebec general election
Party	Candidate	Votes	%
Liberal	Gérard Cournoyer	8,751	52.88
Union Nationale	Bernard Gagné	7,797	47.12
Total valid votes		16,548	98.92
Total rejected ballots		181	1.08
Turnout		16,729	89.91
Electors on the lists		18,606	

1948 Quebec general election
Party	Candidate	Votes	%
Union Nationale	Bernard Gagné	6,647	47.86
Liberal	Joseph-Willie Robidoux	6,270	45.15
Union des électeurs	Roger Tardif	970	6.98
Total valid votes		13,887	99.06
Total rejected ballots		132	0.94
Turnout		14,019	84.48
Electors on the lists		16,594	

1944 Quebec general election
Party	Candidate	Votes	%
Liberal	Joseph-Willie Robidoux	7,636	55.98
Union Nationale	Joseph-Honorius Michaud	3,344	24.51
Bloc populaire	Théode Perron	2,661	19.51
Total valid votes		13,641	99.24
Total rejected ballots		132	0.76
Turnout		13,745	77.73
Electors on the lists		17,682	

== See also ==
- List of Quebec provincial electoral districts
- Canadian provincial electoral districts
