= Ministry of Government =

The Ministry of Government may refer to:

- Ministry of Government (Bolivia)
- Ministry of Government (Ecuador)
- Ministry of Government (Panama)
- Ministry of Government Administration, Reform and Church Affairs, Norway ministry responsible for reform work, information technology, competition policy
- Ministry of Government and Consumer Services (Ontario), Ontario, Canada ministry responsible for the delivery and management of government operations
- Ministry of Government Legislation, South Korea
- Ministry of Government Services (Quebec), Quebec, Canada
