= Parti Québécois candidates in the 1998 Quebec provincial election =

The Parti Québécois ran one hundred and twenty-four candidates in the 1998 provincial election, seventy-seven of whom were elected as the party won a second consecutive majority government under the leadership of Lucien Bouchard. Many of the party's candidates have their own biography pages; information about others may be found here.

== Candidates ==
=== Chapleau: Claude Hallé ===
Claude Hallé is a founder of a program for single parents in the Outaouais. Thirty-eight years old in 1998, she focused her campaign on social rather than constitutional issues, downplaying the importance of Quebec sovereignty. She received 12,600 votes (30.72%), finishing second against Liberal candidate Benoît Pelletier.

In 2003, Hallé criticized a plan by Parti Québécois leader Bernard Landry to allow the parents of young children to take one unpaid day off per week. She argued that the plan would discriminate against single parents, who would be less likely to afford the pay reduction.
