= Bloc pot candidates in the 2003 Quebec provincial election =

The Bloc pot ran fifty-six candidates in the 2003 Quebec provincial election, none of whom were elected. Information about these candidates may be found on this page.

== Candidates ==
=== Argenteuil: Yannick Charpentier ===
Yannick Charpentier received 292 votes (1.23%), finishing fifth against Liberal incumbent David Whissell.

=== Chapleau: Daniel Leblanc-Poirier ===
Daniel Leblanc-Poirier was born in 1984 in Campbellton, New Brunswick and raised in suburban Ottawa. He holds a Bachelor of Arts degree in political science from the Université du Québec à Montréal and has published two works of poetry: La lune n'aura pas de chandelier (2007) and Gyrophares de danse parfaite (2010). He received 402 votes (1.34%) in 2003, finishing fourth against Liberal incumbent Benoît Pelletier.

=== Richelieu: Marie-Hélène Charbonneau ===
Marie-Hélène Charbonneau identified as a young comedian from Saint-Barnabé, Quebec and ran a low-profile campaign. She received 407 votes (1.42%), finishing fourth against Parti Québécois incumbent Sylvain Simard.

=== Viau: Guillaume Blouin-Beaudoin ===
Guillaume Blouin-Beaudoin was a Bloc pot candidate in the 1998 and 2003 provincial elections. He received 6.23% of the vote in his first bid for public office, a record for the party : unexpected withdrawal of the local Parti Québécois candidate halfway through the campaign helped Bloun-Beaudon to reach 3rd place. In the 2003 election, Blouin-Beaudoin was described as twenty-three years old with a CEGEP education.

He intended to run as a Projet Montréal candidate in the 2005 Montreal municipal election for a council seat in the Desmarchais-Crawford ward, but withdrew before election day. He continued municipal politics through citizens' question periods and, amongst other propositions, demanded that public consultations be publicised in bus shelters; he also demanded that the water-meter contract be canceled. He then ran as an independent in 2009 in François-Perrault; in this campaign, he described himself as having a degree in environmental management and wanting to have a direct democracy approach.

Electoral record
Election	Division	Party	Votes	%	Place	Winner
1998 provincial	Viau	Bloc pot	1,668	6.23	3/7	William Cusano, Liberal
2003 provincial	Viau	Bloc pot	426	1.57	4/6	William Cusano, Liberal
2009 municipal	Montreal city council, François-Perrault division	Independent	282	3.55	4/4	Frank Venneri, Union Montreal
