= Léon Leduc =

Canadian politician

Léon Leduc (December 12, 1832 – April 1, 1895) was a tanner and political figure in Quebec. He represented Richelieu in the Legislative Assembly of Quebec from 1881 to 1886 as a Conservative.

He was born in Notre-Dame de Montréal, Lower Canada, the son of Léon Leduc and Pélagie Papin. Leduc apprenticed as a tanner at Oshawa and entered business on his own in Montreal in 1854, later moving to Sorel where he opened a tannery. In 1860, he married Aglaé Claude. He was unsuccessful when he ran for reelection in 1886 and 1890, losing to Louis-Pierre-Paul Cardin each time. Leduc died in Sorel at the age of 62.
