= Quebec Liberal Party candidates in the 2003 Quebec provincial election =

The Quebec Liberal Party fielded a full slate of 125 candidates in the 2003 Quebec provincial election and elected seventy-six members to win a majority government in the National Assembly. Many of the party's candidates have their own biography pages; information about others may be found here.

== Candidates ==
=== Richelieu: Benoît Lefebvre ===
Benoît Lefebvre was born and raised in the Sorel-Tracy region of Quebec. He has a Bachelor's Degree in industrial relations and has also studied law and social services. After serving as chief of staff for the provincial Ministre délégué à la forêt, à la faune et aux parcs early in his career, he later became active in human resources management. He was thirty-five years old at the time of the 2003 election and his campaign focused on economic development and health issues. He received 10,927 votes (38.13%), finishing second against Parti Québécois incumbent Sylvain Simard.

Lefebvre joined the board of directors of Conporec Inc. in 2005. He resigned later in the year, when he was appointed chief of staff for the provincial minister of Natural Resources and Wildlife. In 2009, Lefebvre went on a trip to Machu Picchu to raise money for local charities.
