= Jocelyn Desjardins =

Jocelyn Desjardins MNA
- Jocelyn Desjardins in 2013

Member of the National Assembly for Richelieu
- Incumbent
- Assumed office October 5, 2026
- Preceded by: Jean-Bernard Émond

Personal details
- Born: 7 January 1970 (age 56) Laval, Quebec
- Party: Parti Québécois

Jocelyn Desjardins (born 7 January 1970) is a Canadian politician who was the elected to the National Assembly of Quebec for Richelieu in the 2026 Quebec general election as a member of the Parti Québécois. He was a journalist and announcer at Radio-Canada and L'Actualité médicale. He was head of communications at United Steelworkers.

== Electoral record ==
2026 Quebec general election: Richelieu
** Preliminary results — Not yet official **
Party	Candidate	Votes	%	±%
Parti Québécois	Jocelyn Desjardins	15,074	41.26	
Coalition Avenir Québec	Jean-Bernard Émond	7,852	21.49	
Conservative	Christian Blouin	6,704	18.35	
Liberal	Gilles Delorme	3,916	10.72	
Québec solidaire	Julien Bergeron	2,482	6.79	
Climat Québec	Martin Larivière	352	0.96	
Démocratie directe	Jean-Louis Raymond	155	0.42	
Total valid votes				
Total rejected ballots				
Turnout			68.78	
Electors on the lists				
Parti Québécois gain from Coalition Avenir Québec		Swing		+
Source: Élections Québec
