= Mathieu Lévesque =

Canadian politician

Interim Leader of the Coalition Avenir Québec
- Incumbent
- Assumed office October 17, 2026
- Preceded by: Christine Fréchette

Member of the National Assembly of Quebec for Chapleau
- In office October 1, 2018 – October 5, 2026
- Preceded by: Marc Carrière
- Succeeded by: Michel Langevin

Personal details
- Born: Gatineau, Quebec
- Party: Coalition Avenir Québec

Mathieu Lévesque is a Canadian politician, who was first elected to the National Assembly of Quebec in the 2018 provincial election. He represented the electoral district of Chapleau as a member of the Coalition Avenir Québec. He was re-elected in 2022.

In the 2026 Quebec general election, he was unseated by Michel Langevin from the Quebec Liberal Party. Following the election, he was named interim leader of the CAQ.

== Electoral record ==
2026 Quebec general election: Chapleau
** Preliminary results — Not yet official **
Party	Candidate	Votes	%	±%
Liberal	Michel Langevin	12,816	37.46	+24.09
Parti Québécois	Meixia Maltais	6,740	19.70	+10.17
Coalition Avenir Québec	Mathieu Lévesque	5,652	16.52	–35.76
Conservative	Denis Charron	5,471	15.99	+5.61
Québec solidaire	Doryan Pansanel	2,911	8.51	–4.80
Green	Olguine Michelle Loussaint	288	0.84	N/A
Canadian	Marcela Martínez	286	0.84	N/A
Marxist–Leninist	Pierre Soublière	52	0.15	–0.08
Total valid votes		34,216	98.63	
Total rejected ballots		477	1.37	
Turnout		34,693	58.57	
Electors on the lists		59,230		
Liberal notional gain from Coalition Avenir Québec		Swing		+29.92
Source: Élections Québec

2022 Quebec general election: Chapleau
Party	Candidate	Votes	%	±%
Coalition Avenir Québec	Mathieu Lévesque	16,363	52.30	+11.88
Liberal	Assumpta Ndengeyingoma	4,259	13.61	-18.96
Québec solidaire	Sabrina Labrecque-Boivin	4,129	13.20	-2.66
Conservative	Matthieu Kadri	3,161	10.10	+8.56
Parti Québécois	Marisa Gutierrez	3,033	9.70	+0.65
Climat Québec	Anne-Marie Meunier	267	0.85	–
Marxist–Leninist	Pierre Soublière	72	0.23	-0.33
Total valid votes		31,284	98.79	–
Total rejected ballots		383	1.21	–
Turnout		31,667	58.78	
Electors on the lists		53,875		

2018 Quebec general election: Chapleau
Party	Candidate	Votes	%	±%
Coalition Avenir Québec	Mathieu Lévesque	13,057	40.42	+25.68
Liberal	Marc Carrière	10,520	32.57	-25.26
Québec solidaire	Alexandre Albert	5,122	15.86	+10
Parti Québécois	Blake Ippersiel	2,922	9.05	-9.43
Conservative	Rowen Tanguay	497	1.54	+1.54
Marxist–Leninist	Françoise Roy	182	0.56	+0.26
Total valid votes		32,300	98.30	
Total rejected ballots		557	1.70	
Turnout		32,857	59.78	
Eligible voters		54,962		
Coalition Avenir Québec gain from Liberal		Swing		+25.47
Source(s) "Rapport des résultats officiels du scrutin". Élections Québec.
