= Albert Khelfa =

Canadian politician (born 1945)

Member of the National Assembly of Quebec for Richelieu
- In office 1985–1994
- Preceded by: Maurice Martel
- Succeeded by: Sylvain Simard

Personal details
- Born: January 11, 1945 (age 81) Cairo, Egypt
- Party: Liberal
- Profession: teacher, consultant

Albert Khelfa (born January 11, 1945) is a former Canadian politician. Khelfa served in the National Assembly of Quebec from 1985 to 1994 as a member of the Liberal Party.

== Early life and career ==
Khelfa was born in Cairo, Egypt, and received a diploma in dental surgery from the University of Cairo. After moving to Canada, he earned a Bachelor's Degree in education and a certificate in business administration from the Université du Québec à Trois-Rivières and a certificate in testing and assessment from the University of Montreal. He was a secondary school teacher in comparative biology and human biology in Sorel from 1969 to 1983 and taught English at the primary level from 1983 to 1985. He also served on the executive of the Teachers' Union of Sorel from 1976 to 1980 and was president of the Sorel-Tracy Multicultural Group from 1978 to 1980.

== Legislator ==
Khelfa was first elected to the Quebec legislature in the 1985 general election, defeating Parti Québécois (PQ) cabinet minister Maurice Martel in the Richelieu division. The Liberals won a majority government in this election under Robert Bourassa, and Khelfa entered the legislature as a government backbencher. He was appointed to the legislative committee on education and culture in 1986. In 1988, he supported the Bourassa government's compromise on Quebec's language laws, in which only francophone signs, billboards, and posters were permitted outdoors but bilingual signs were allowed indoors.

Khelfa was re-elected in the 1989 general election and was re-appointed to the committee on culture later in the year. He spoke against a neo-nazi rally that was held at a small town in his riding in 1992.

He was defeated by Parti Québécois candidate Sylvain Simard in 1994, as the Liberal Party lost power to the PQ provincially.

== After politics ==
Khelfa became a senior management and international development consultant after leaving the Quebec legislature. He was appointed to the board of directors of the Klondike Star Mineral Corporation on October 12, 2006, and resigned two years later.

== Electoral record ==
1994 Quebec general election: Richelieu
Party	Candidate	Votes	%	±%
Parti Québécois	Sylvain Simard	17,186	55.09	+12.84
Liberal	Albert Khelfa	12,441	39.88	−13.49
Independent	Marcel Cloutier	1,570	5.03	
Total valid votes		31,197	100.00	
Rejected and declined votes		1,003		
Turnout		32,200	83.23	+3.42
Electors on the lists		38,688		
Source: Official Results, Le Directeur général des élections du Québec.

1989 Quebec general election: Richelieu
Party	Candidate	Votes	%	±%
Liberal	Albert Khelfa	15,790	53.37	+0.22
Parti Québécois	Guy Savard	12,502	42.25	−1.00
Independent	Rodrigue Lemoyne	1,296	4.38	
Total valid votes		29,588	100.00	
Rejected and declined votes		1,260		
Turnout		30,848	79.81	
Electors on the lists		38,650		

1985 Quebec general election: Richelieu
Party	Candidate	Votes	%	±%
Liberal	Albert Khelfa	16,373	53.14	+13.01
Parti Québécois	Maurice Martel	13,326	43.25	−12.81
New Democratic	Guy Verville	587	1.91	
Independent	Michel Guilbault	347	1.13	
Christian Socialist	Diane Dufour	105	0.34	
Commonwealth of Canada	Jean-Paul Belley	72	0.23	
Total valid votes		30,810		
Rejected and declined votes		585		
Turnout		31,395	81.90	−3.95
Electors on the lists		38,335		
