= Independent candidates in the 2003 Quebec provincial election =

There were several independent candidates in the 2003 Quebec provincial election, none of whom were elected. Information about these candidates may be found on this page.

== Candidates ==
=== Richelieu: Nidal Joad ===
Nidal Joad was born in Syria and was forty years old at the time of the election. The founder of a municipal political party called l’Action civique active, he unsuccessfully approached the Parti Québécois and sought the Liberal Party nomination before deciding to run as an independent in 2003. He centred his campaign around economic issues, calling for the creation of a program that would allow Quebecers to carry out personal loans from their registered savings plans. He also supported a direct childcare payment to parents in place of daycare funding and claimed that he was the originator of Liberal leader Jean Charest's policy on centralized municipal taxation. He received 109 votes (0.38%), finishing fifth against Parti Québécois incumbent Sylvain Simard.

In 2005, Joad started another new municipal party called Groupe succès vie municipale Sorel-Tracy.

A Quebec Superior Court judge declared Joad to be plaideur quérulent in 2008, following a series of unsuccessful legal actions that the judge deemed as vexatious.

=== Richelieu: Steve Ritter ===
Steve Ritter was a forty-six-year-old construction worker at the time of the election. Campaigning on horse and by bicycle, he called for a fundamental change in Quebec's political culture and the creation of a sovereign republic. He received 100 votes (0.35%), finishing sixth against Parti Québécois incumbent Sylvain Simard.
