= Marc Carrière =

Canadian politician

Prefect of Les Collines-de-l'Outaouais Regional County Municipality
- Incumbent
- Assumed office November 7, 2021
- Preceded by: Position established

Member of the National Assembly of Quebec for Chapleau
- In office December 8, 2008 – August 29, 2018
- Preceded by: Benoît Pelletier
- Succeeded by: Mathieu Lévesque

Mayor of Val-des-Monts
- In office November 3, 1996 – December 8, 2008
- Preceded by: Gérald Durand
- Succeeded by: Jean Lafrenière

Personal details
- Born: September 21, 1964 (age 61) Gatineau, Quebec, Canada
- Party: Liberal
- Education: University of Ottawa

Marc Carrière (born 21 September 1964) is a politician in the Canadian province of Quebec, who was elected to represent the riding of Chapleau in the National Assembly of Quebec in the 2008 provincial election. He is a member of the Quebec Liberal Party.

Born in Gatineau, Quebec, Carrière obtained a bachelor's degree from the University of Ottawa. He was a member of the municipality of Val-des-Monts council from 1992 to 1996 and was mayor of the same municipality from 1996 until his election in 2008 in which he won without opposition in 2000 and 2005. He was a prefect for the Les Collines-de-l'Outaouais Regional County. He was also the president of the Conférence régionale des élus de l’Outaouais (CREO) from 2004 to 2008.

Carrière became the first elected prefect of Les Collines-de-l'Outaouais in the 2021 Quebec municipal elections.

== Electoral record ==
2025 Quebec municipal elections: Les Collines-de-l'Outaouais Regional County Municipality
Party	Candidate	Popular vote			Expenditures
Party	Candidate	Votes	%	±%	Expenditures
Independent	Marc Carrière	Acclaimed	–	–	none listed
Total valid votes		–	–		
Total rejected, unmarked and declined votes		–	–		
Turnout		–	–	–	
Eligible voters		42,697			
Note: Candidate campaign colours, unless a member of a party, are based on the prominent colour used in campaign items (signs, literature, etc.) or colours used in polling graphs and are used as a visual differentiation between candidates.
Sources: Les Collines-de-l'Outaouais Regional County Municipality

2008 Quebec general election: Chapleau
Party	Candidate	Votes	%	±%
Liberal	Marc Carrière	13,968	54.71	
Parti Québécois	Yves Morin	6,560	25.69	
Action démocratique	Gilles Taillon	3,194	12.51	
Green	Roger Fleury	1,032	4.04	–
Québec solidaire	Benoit Renaud	609	2.39	
Independent	Michel Soucy	118	0.46	
Marxist–Leninist	Pierre Soublière	51	0.20	
Total valid votes		25,532	100.00	
Rejected and declined votes		314		
Turnout		25,846	47.96	
Electors on the lists		53,892		
Source: Official Results, Government of Quebec
