= Michel Langevin (politician) =

Quebec politician

Michel Langevin MNA

Member of the National Assembly for Chapleau
- Incumbent
- Assumed office October 5, 2026
- Preceded by: Mathieu Lévesque

Personal details
- Party: Quebec Liberal Party
- Website: plq.org/en/equipe/michel-langevin/

Michel Langevin is a Quebec politician who was the elected to the National Assembly of Quebec for Chapleau in the 2026 Quebec general election as a member of the Quebec Liberal Party. In the election he unseated the incumbent Coalition Avenir Québec (CAQ) MNA, Mathieu Lévesque. He left his media career to enter politics. He was a journalist by profession. He is known as the radio host of the Cogeco morning show on 104.7 FM.

== Electoral record ==
2026 Quebec general election: Chapleau
** Preliminary results — Not yet official **
Party	Candidate	Votes	%	±%
Liberal	Michel Langevin	12,816	37.46	+24.09
Parti Québécois	Meixia Maltais	6,740	19.70	+10.17
Coalition Avenir Québec	Mathieu Lévesque	5,652	16.52	–35.76
Conservative	Denis Charron	5,471	15.99	+5.61
Québec solidaire	Doryan Pansanel	2,911	8.51	–4.80
Green	Olguine Michelle Loussaint	288	0.84	N/A
Canadian	Marcela Martínez	286	0.84	N/A
Marxist–Leninist	Pierre Soublière	52	0.15	–0.08
Total valid votes		34,216	98.63	
Total rejected ballots		477	1.37	
Turnout		34,693	58.57	
Electors on the lists		59,230		
Liberal notional gain from Coalition Avenir Québec		Swing		+29.92
Source: Élections Québec
