= Independent and non-affiliated candidates in the 1998 Quebec provincial election =

There were independent and non-affiliated candidates in the 1998 Quebec provincial election, none of whom were elected. Information about these candidates may be found on this page.

== Candidates ==
=== Mercier: Ann Farrell ===
Ann Farrell was a Humanist Party of Quebec candidate in two elections during the 1980s. She later tried to re-establish the Humanist Party in Montreal, in a bid to run three candidates at the federal level in the 1997 Canadian election. Farrell may have been an unofficial Humanist Party candidate in 1998.

Electoral record
Election	Division	Party	Votes	%	Place	Winner
1985 provincial	Sainte-Marie	Humanist	169	0.90	6/10	Michel Laporte, Liberal
provincial by-election, 20 January 1986	Saint-Laurent	Humanist	202	1.04	5/10	Robert Bourassa, Liberal
1998 provincial	Mercier	Independent	158	0.50	6/9	Robert Perreault, Parti Québécois
2001 municipal	Montreal City Council, Plateau-Mont-Royal ward	Independent	150	1.76	4/5	Nicolas Tétrault, Vision Montreal

=== Richelieu: Michel Groleau ===
Michel Groleau appeared on the ballot as a non-affiliated candidate. He received 261 votes (0.83%), finishing fourth against Parti Québécois incumbent Sylvain Simard.
