= Secrétariat aux affaires intergouvernementales canadiennes (Quebec) =

Agency of the government of Quebec

The Secrétariat du Québec aux relations canadiennes (SQRC), formerly known as the Secrétariat aux affaires intergouvernementales canadiennes (SAIC), is an agency of the government of Quebec. Its purpose is to advise the government on Canadian intergovernmental affairs, coordinate Québec government activities in Canada, defend and promote Québec's interests, and strengthen ties with francophone and Acadian communities elsewhere in Canada.

The secretariat reports to the minister responsible for Canadian Relations. The current minister is Marie-Claude Sarrazin.

Benoît Pelletier, who was minister from 2003 to 2008, was also styled as the minister responsible for the Agreement on Internal Trade from March 17, 2005, to April 18, 2007. This title was not used by his successors.
