= Sainte-Anne-de-Sorel =

- Municipality
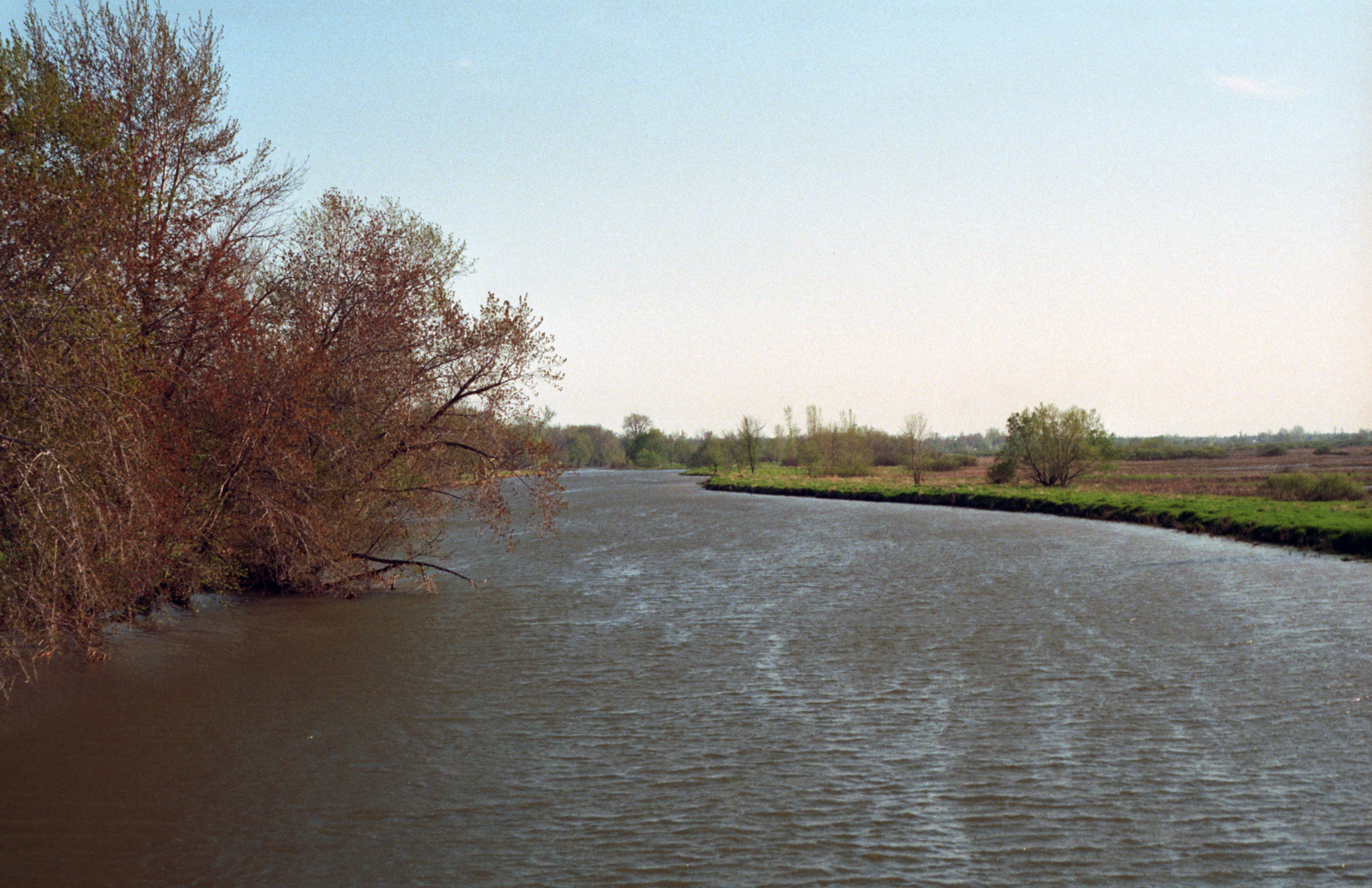
- Monk's canal

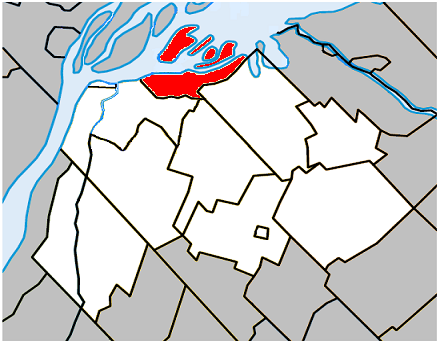
- Location within Pierre-De Saurel RCM

- Location in southern Quebec
- Coordinates: 46°03′N 73°04′W
- Country: Canada
- Province: Quebec
- Region: Montérégie
- RCM: Pierre-De Saurel
- Constituted: May 14, 1877

Government
  - Mayor: Michel Péloquin
  - Federal riding: Bécancour—Nicolet—Saurel—Alnôbak
  - Prov. riding: Richelieu

Area
  - Total: 59.10 km^{2} (22.82 sq mi)
  - Land: 36.41 km^{2} (14.06 sq mi)

Population (2021)
  - Total: 2,731
  - Density: 75/km^{2} (190/sq mi)
  - Pop 2016-2021: ▼1.4%
  - Dwellings: 1,350
- Time zone: UTC−5 (EST)
  - Summer (DST): UTC−4 (EDT)
- Postal code(s): J3P 5N3
- Area codes: 450 and 579
- Highways: No major routes
- Website: www.sainteannedesorel.ca

Sainte-Anne-de-Sorel (French pronunciation: [sɛ̃t an də sɔʁɛl]) is a municipality in the Pierre-De Saurel Regional County Municipality, in the Montérégie region of Quebec. The community consists of a mainland section along with several islands extending into Lac Saint-Pierre. The population as of the Canada 2021 Census was 2,731, which makes it the largest municipality and the second largest urban division of the RCM.

From 2006 throughout 2010 there has been much speculation about Sainte-Anne willing to merge into Sorel-Tracy to become a district (much like the former Saint-Pierre-de-Sorel and Tracy municipalities), however at the present time there has been no future talk about it at both city halls. The RCM planning administration is against the merger though, as it would compromise development potential in Sainte-Anne in favor of Sorel, since property evaluation services would be unified.

== Demographics ==
=== Population ===
Population trend:

Census	Population	Change (%)
2021	2,731	▼1.4%
2016	2,771	▲1.1%
2011	2,742	▼0.1%
2006	2,745	▲2.3%
2001	2,683	▼4.0%
1996	2,795	▼2.5%
1991	2,868	▲7.7%
1986	2,662	▲3.5%
1981	2,573	▲13.4%
1976	2,268	▲15.2%
1971	1,969	▲13.8%
1966	1,730	▲34.3%
1961	1,288	▲9.4%
1956	1,179	▲16.6%
1951	1,011	▲27.0%
1941	796	▼2.6%
1931	817	▼7.7%
1921	885	▼6.4%
1911	946	▼15.8%
1901	1,123	▼7.4%
1891	1,213	▲3.2%
1881	1,175	N/A

=== Language ===
Mother tongue language (2021)

Language	Population	Pct (%)
French only	2,675	97.8%
English only	30	1.1%
Both English & French	10	0.4%
Other languages	15	0.5%

== See also ==
- List of municipalities in Quebec
