= Gérard Cournoyer =

Canadian politician

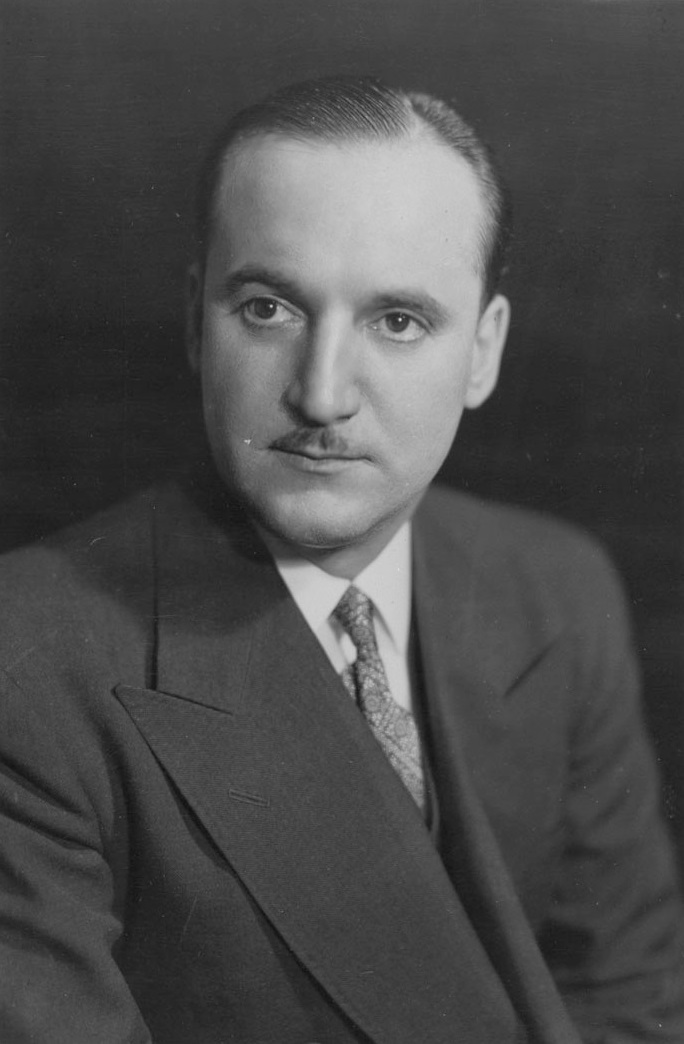

Member of Parliament for Richelieu—Verchères
- In office December 1946 – July 1952
- Preceded by: Pierre Joseph Arthur Cardin
- Succeeded by: Lucien Cardin

Member of the Legislative Assembly of Quebec for Richelieu
- In office 1952–1956
- In office 1960–1966

Personal details
- Born: 18 April 1912 Sorel, Quebec
- Died: 11 November 1973 (aged 61) Montreal, Quebec
- Party: Liberal
- Spouse(s): Madeleine Turcotte m. 2 September 1940
- Profession: lawyer

Gérard Cournoyer (18 April 1912 – 11 November 1973) was a Liberal party member of the House of Commons of Canada. He was born in Sorel, Quebec and became a lawyer by career.

Cournoyer studied at the Saint Hyacinthe Seminary, then attended the University of Montreal where he received his Bachelor of Arts and Bachelor of Laws degrees. He was called to the Quebec bar in 1935.

He was first elected to Parliament at the Richelieu—Verchères riding in a by-election on 23 December 1946 then re-elected there in the 1949 federal election.

Cournoyer resigned his House of Commons seat on 5 July 1952 during his term in the 21st Canadian Parliament to pursue provincial politics in Quebec where he won a Legislative Assembly seat in the Richelieu riding later that year in the 1952 Quebec election. He was defeated in 1956, but was elected again in 1960 and again in 1962. From 1960 to 1964, he was Minister of Transport and Communication under the Jean Lesage administration, then was minister of Hunting and Fishing until 1965, then a minister without portfolio until his election defeat in 1966.
