= Claude A. Simard =

Canadian painter (1943–2014)

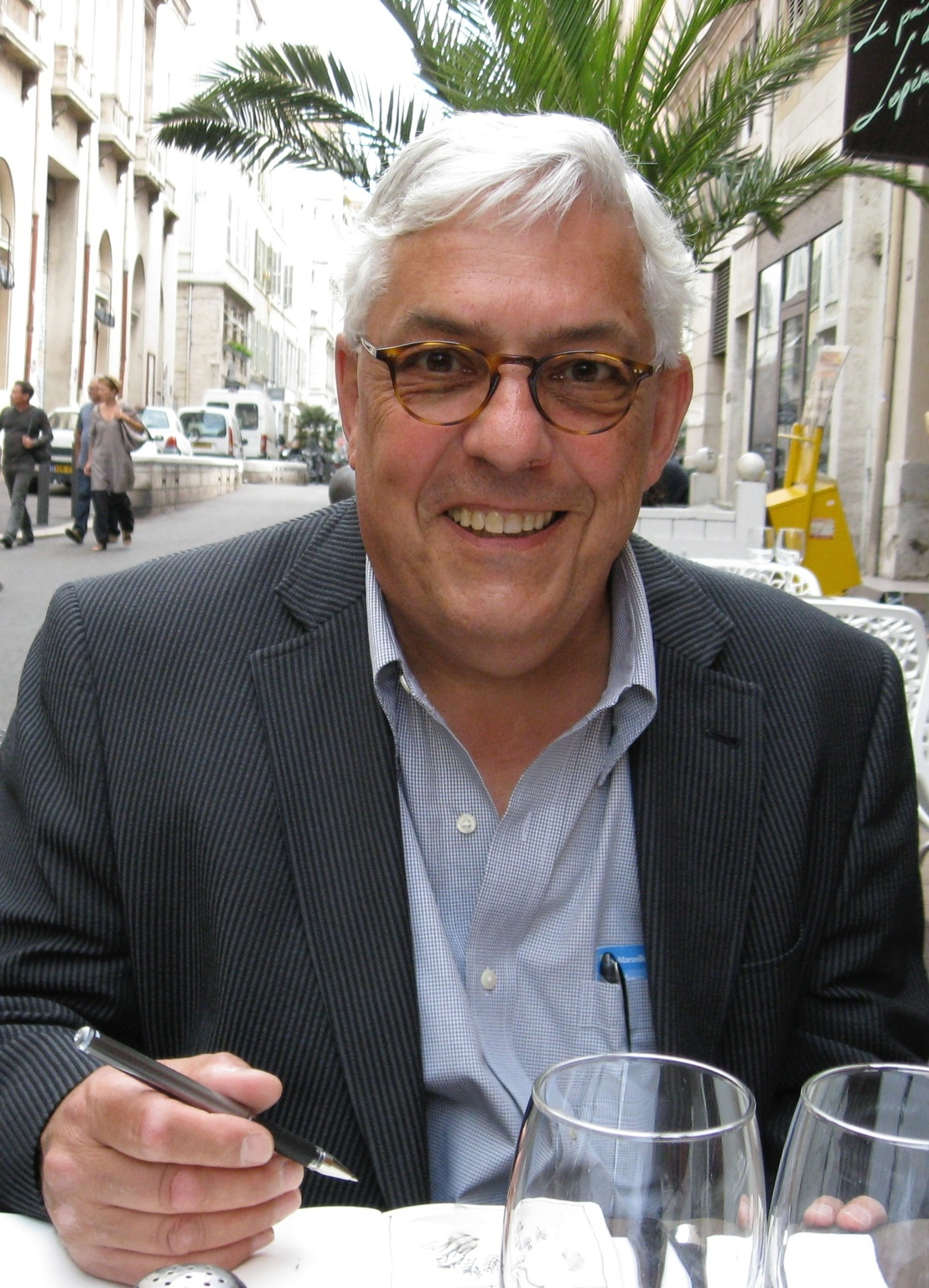
- Marseilles, 2009
- Born: Claude Alphonse Simard; July 9, 1943; Quebec City, Quebec, Canada
- Died: September 15, 2014 (aged 71)
- Education: Ontario College of Art and Design (graduated 1966)
- Known for: painter and graphic artist

Claude Alphonse Simard RCA (July 9, 1943 – September 15, 2014) was a Canadian painter born in Quebec City, Quebec. Simard's works depicted garden scenes, landscapes, still lifes and the human figure in a boldly colored and stylzed manner.

== Biography ==
Born in Quebec City, Simard studied graphic design at the Ontario College of Art, in Toronto (1962-1966). While still a student in his final year he served as an apprentice with the British Motors Corporation's graphic design department in Birmingham, England (1965). In 1966 he became head of Communications and Design for Simons' in Quebec City. In 1972 he was responsible for the redesigning of Simons' Sainte-Foy store. In 1973 he founded the Communikart design group and worked on corporate identity projects, book publishing, advertising, environmental graphics and exhibition design till 1984. He also designed over a dozen books for the Quebec Museum; and was a consultant for the Quebec government. In 1979 he was also involved in designing for Parks Canada. He became vice-dean of the Faculty of Arts at Laval University, then in 1975-1981, taught part-time at the School. He was a Professor, University of Laval (1984–2001).

== Honours ==
- Founding member of Quebec Graphic Designers Society (1974) and author of Society's Code of Ethics (Bd. of Dirs. 1974-1976)
- NY Soc. of Illustrators (1977)
- Elected Royal Canadian Academy of Arts, (1983) (Council Mbr. 1984- 1987)

== Art work ==
- Over 60 silk screen prints editioned since 1975
- Card editions by Unicef, Hallmark, L'Imagerie and Cartes Pôle Nord
- postage stamps for Canada Post 1983 and 1987
- Major mural commissions for Parks Canada, Esso, City of Sainte-Foy
- Artist Garden (Jardin Bon Accueil) subject of several major articles and TV shows

== Selected exhibitions ==
35 solo exhibitions since 1974, such as the following:

- Paris Show at L'Orangerie de Bagatelle, 1991
- Montreal, Galerie Walter Klinkhoff, 1986, 1988, 1993, 1997
- Calgary, Masters Gallery, 1992, 1995, 2000
- Toronto, Roberts Gallery, 1996, 1999, 2000
- Québec City, Galerie Perreault, 2011
- "Painting Happiness": Claude A. Simard Retrospective, Centre d’interprétation historique de Sainte-Foy, Quebec City, 2016
