= Minister of State for Education and Employment (Quebec) =

The Minister of State for Education and Employment is a former ministerial title in the Executive Council of Quebec. Established in 2001, it was discontinued in 2003 when the ministerial responsibilities for education and employment were split between two different ministries.
