= Secrétariat à la réforme des institutions démocratiques et à l'accès à l'information =

The Secrétariat à la réforme des institutions démocratiques et à l'accès à l'information (French pronunciation: [səkʁetaʁja a la ʁefɔʁm dez‿ɛ̃stitysjɔ̃ demɔkʁatik e a laksɛ a lɛ̃fɔʁmasjɔ̃]) is an agency of the Government of Quebec. Its stated purpose as of 2010 is to "[report] to the Minister responsible for the Reform of Democratic Institutions and Access to Information and [advise] him in matters pertaining to his mandate to maintain the quality of democratic institutions and to preserve the right of citizens to information and to protection of their personal information."

The secretariat's mandate encompasses Quebec legislation such as the Election Act, the Referendum Act, and the Act respecting the National Assembly.

The current minister responsible for the Reform of Democratic Institutions and Access to Information is Kathleen Weil.
