= Louis Lacouture =

Canadian politician

Louis Lacouture (January 22, 1858 – January 16, 1932) was a businessman and political figure in Quebec. He represented Richelieu in the Legislative Assembly of Quebec from 1892 to 1897 as a Conservative.

He was born in Saint-Ours, Canada East, the son of Théophile Lacouture and Julienne Gaudet. He worked for the Richelieu & Ontario Navigation Company (later Canada Steamship Lines), first as a local agent, then as chief accountant and later as a director. Lacouture founded the Saint Lawrence Navigation Company and the Gaieté Theatre Company. In 1877, he married Célanire Badeau. He did not run for reelection to the Quebec assembly in 1897 and was defeated when he ran for reelection in 1900. Cartier died in Sorel at the age of 73.
