= Claire Vaive =

Canadian politician

Claire Vaive (born March 6, 1940, in Hull, Quebec) was a politician in Quebec, Canada. She was the member of National Assembly of Quebec from 1994 to 1998 and was a councillor for Gatineau City Council for 14 years.

Vaive is a graduate from the Université du Québec à Hull (now Université du Québec en Outaouais with a degree in teaching for administration and commercial courses. She was a teacher since 1965.

She entered municipal politics and was elected councillor for the old city of Gatineau in 1983 and remained there until 1994 when she was elected in 1994 as MNA for Chapleau as a Liberal until 1998 when she did not seek a re-election, giving way to Benoît Pelletier, a Liberal Minister for the Jean Charest Cabinet since the Liberal won in 2003. She returned to municipal politics and was re-elected to the former Gatineau City Council. After the amalgamation of the five communities of the Outaouais Urban Community, she faced another incumbent from a neighboring ward and was narrowly defeated in the 2001 municipal elections. After her defeat, Vaive did not run again in any elections in any government level although she is currently working for the Liberal Party of Canada's Outaouais division as a vice-president.
