= Secrétariat aux affaires autochtones (Quebec) =

The Secretariat for Relations with the First Nations and the Inuit (French: Secrétariat aux relations avec les Premières Nations et les Inuit, SRPNI) is a government secretariat of Quebec responsible for coordinating the Government of Quebec's policies and actions concerning First Nations and the Inuit of Quebec. It is part of the Executive Council of Quebec and reports to the minister responsible for relations with the First Nations and the Inuit.

The organization was established in January 1978 as the Secrétariat des activités gouvernementales en milieu amérindien et inuit (SAGMAI). It was created within the Executive Council to coordinate government action concerning Indigenous peoples and to develop a comprehensive Quebec policy on Indigenous affairs. It replaced the Direction générale du Nouveau-Québec and the Bureau de coordination de l'Entente de la Baie-James.

The organization was renamed the Secrétariat aux affaires autochtones (Secretariat for Aboriginal Affairs) on January 14, 1987. On October 20, 2022, it was renamed the Secrétariat aux relations avec les Premières Nations et les Inuit. The change in designation was intended to reflect the evolution of relations between the Government of Quebec and Indigenous peoples toward a relationship based on nation-to-nation relations.

== History ==
=== Creation in 1978 ===
The secretariat was created in January 1978 by the government of Premier René Lévesque. Its original name, Secrétariat des activités gouvernementales en milieu amérindien et inuit (SAGMAI), reflected its initial role as a coordinating body for the Quebec government's activities concerning Indigenous peoples. It brought together functions previously exercised by the Direction générale du Nouveau-Québec and the Bureau de coordination de l'Entente de la Baie-James.

The creation of the secretariat followed the signing of the James Bay and Northern Quebec Agreement in 1975 and the increasing involvement of the Quebec government in Indigenous affairs, particularly in northern Quebec. The secretariat was placed within the Executive Council in order to coordinate the activities of different ministries and to develop a comprehensive government policy rather than treating Indigenous affairs solely as the responsibility of individual departments.

=== The 1983 principles ===
On February 9, 1983, the Quebec government adopted fifteen principles concerning the status and rights of Indigenous peoples. The principles became an important foundation of Quebec's Indigenous policy and were subsequently reaffirmed and supplemented by resolutions of the National Assembly.

Among other things, the principles recognized the Indigenous peoples of Quebec as distinct nations with rights to their culture, language, customs and traditions, and recognized their right to determine the development of their own identity. They also addressed land rights, participation in economic development, natural-resource management, Indigenous institutions, consultation and relations between Indigenous nations and the Quebec government.

The first three principles stated:

Quebec recognizes that the Aboriginal peoples of Quebec constitute distinct nations entitled to their own culture, language, traditions and customs, as well as the right to determine themselves the development of their own identity.

Quebec recognizes the right of Aboriginal nations, within the framework of Quebec legislation, to own and control lands attributed to them.

These rights are to be exercised within the Quebec community and do not imply rights of sovereignty that could affect the territorial integrity of Quebec.

=== Recognition of the eleven Indigenous nations ===
On March 20, 1985, the National Assembly of Quebec adopted a resolution recognizing the existence in Quebec of ten First Nations and the Inuit nation. A further resolution in 1989 completed this framework. Quebec consequently recognizes eleven Indigenous nations: the Abenaki, Algonquin, Atikamekw, Cree, Huron-Wendat, Innu, Inuit, Maliseet, Mi'kmaq, Mohawk and Naskapi.

The government's policy framework subsequently emphasized recognition of Indigenous institutions, the exercise of jurisdictions established through agreements, participation in economic development, and the adaptation of legislation and regulations to Indigenous realities.

=== 1987 name change ===
On January 14, 1987, SAGMAI was renamed the Secrétariat aux affaires autochtones (SAA). The new structure retained its coordinating function while assuming a broader role in Indigenous policy, including providing information about government programs, conducting negotiations concerning comprehensive agreements and coordinating their implementation.

=== 2022 name change ===
On October 20, 2022, the SAA became the Secrétariat aux relations avec les Premières Nations et les Inuit. At the same time, the ministerial title changed from Minister Responsible for Aboriginal Affairs to Minister Responsible for Relations with the First Nations and the Inuit. The government described the change as reflecting the evolution of its relations with Indigenous peoples and its emphasis on nation-to-nation relations.

== Mandate and responsibilities ==
The SRPNI coordinates the Government of Quebec's overall action concerning Indigenous affairs and relations with First Nations and the Inuit. It is responsible for ensuring consistency among the policies, interventions, initiatives and positions of Quebec government departments and agencies.

The secretariat also acts as a principal link between First Nations and Inuit communities and the Government of Quebec. It works with Indigenous nations, communities and organizations to facilitate access to government programs and services, adapt government activities to Indigenous realities and develop initiatives addressing specific needs, including through collaboration and co-construction with Indigenous communities.

Its responsibilities include:

- coordinating government action concerning First Nations and the Inuit;
- developing and coordinating Quebec's Indigenous policies;
- maintaining relations and partnerships between the Quebec government and Indigenous nations and communities;
- supporting the social, cultural and economic development of First Nations and Inuit;
- facilitating Indigenous access to government programs and services;
- negotiating agreements concerning land claims, natural resources, self-government, culture, heritage, economic development and consultation;
- supporting the implementation of agreements concluded between Quebec and Indigenous nations;
- coordinating government action in northern Quebec;
- supporting relations with Cree, Inuit and Naskapi nations that are parties to agreements with Quebec; and
- providing information and training concerning Indigenous affairs within the Quebec public service.

The secretariat's policy orientations apply to four broad contexts: Indigenous nations that are neither signatories to modern agreements nor engaged in a comprehensive territorial negotiation; nations that are signatories to agreements; nations engaged in comprehensive territorial negotiations; and Indigenous people living outside their communities.

== Agreements and negotiations ==
The secretariat participates in the negotiation and implementation of agreements between the Government of Quebec and Indigenous nations and communities. These agreements may concern land claims, self-government, access to natural resources, wildlife management, economic development, consultation and accommodation, culture and heritage, and other areas of jurisdiction or cooperation.

The SRPNI also coordinates Quebec's responsibilities under agreements concluded with the Cree, Inuit and Naskapi. These include the James Bay and Northern Quebec Agreement and the Northeastern Quebec Agreement, as well as subsequent agreements and arrangements arising from them.

The James Bay and Northern Quebec Agreement, signed in 1975, established extensive rights and institutions for the Cree and Inuit and provided for land allocation, hunting, fishing and trapping rights, financial compensation and the assumption of certain public responsibilities by Indigenous institutions. The Northeastern Quebec Agreement, signed in 1978, extended a similar framework to the Naskapi.

== Indigenous families and missing and murdered Indigenous people ==
The SRPNI is responsible for implementing Quebec's legislation concerning the communication of personal information to families of Indigenous children who went missing or died following admission to an institution. The legislation was adopted in 2021 in response to a justice call arising from the National Inquiry into Missing and Murdered Indigenous Women and Girls.

The secretariat also oversees the Unité québécoise de liaison et d'information à l'intention des familles de personnes autochtones disparues et assassinées (UQLIF), established in 2021. The unit assists relatives in their search for information and truth and facilitates their dealings with relevant institutions. The UQLIF has been part of the SRPNI since October 2024.

== Minister responsible ==
The secretariat falls under the Executive Council of Quebec and is overseen by the Minister Responsible for Relations with the First Nations and the Inuit. As of October 2026, the minister is Simon-Pierre Savard-Tremblay.

== See also ==
- Indigenous peoples in Quebec
- First Nations in Quebec
- Inuit in Quebec
- Government of Quebec
- Executive Council of Quebec
- James Bay and Northern Quebec Agreement
- Northeastern Quebec Agreement
- National Inquiry into Missing and Murdered Indigenous Women and Girls
