= Leader of the government in parliament (Quebec) =

The Leader of the government in parliament (also known as the Government House Leader) is a position in the Executive Council of Quebec. The minister who holds this position does not oversee a government department or agency, but rather leads the governing party in the National Assembly of Quebec.

The relevant minister sets the order of business for the assembly, acts as the governing party's main strategist as regards parliamentary procedure, plans the governing party's business in the legislature, and acts as an intermediary between the assembly and cabinet. The minister who holds this position must be familiar with both the rules of parliamentary procedure and with parliamentary custom.

The current leader of the government in parliament is Simon Jolin-Barette.
