= Jacob (clothing retailer) =

Canadian clothing store chain

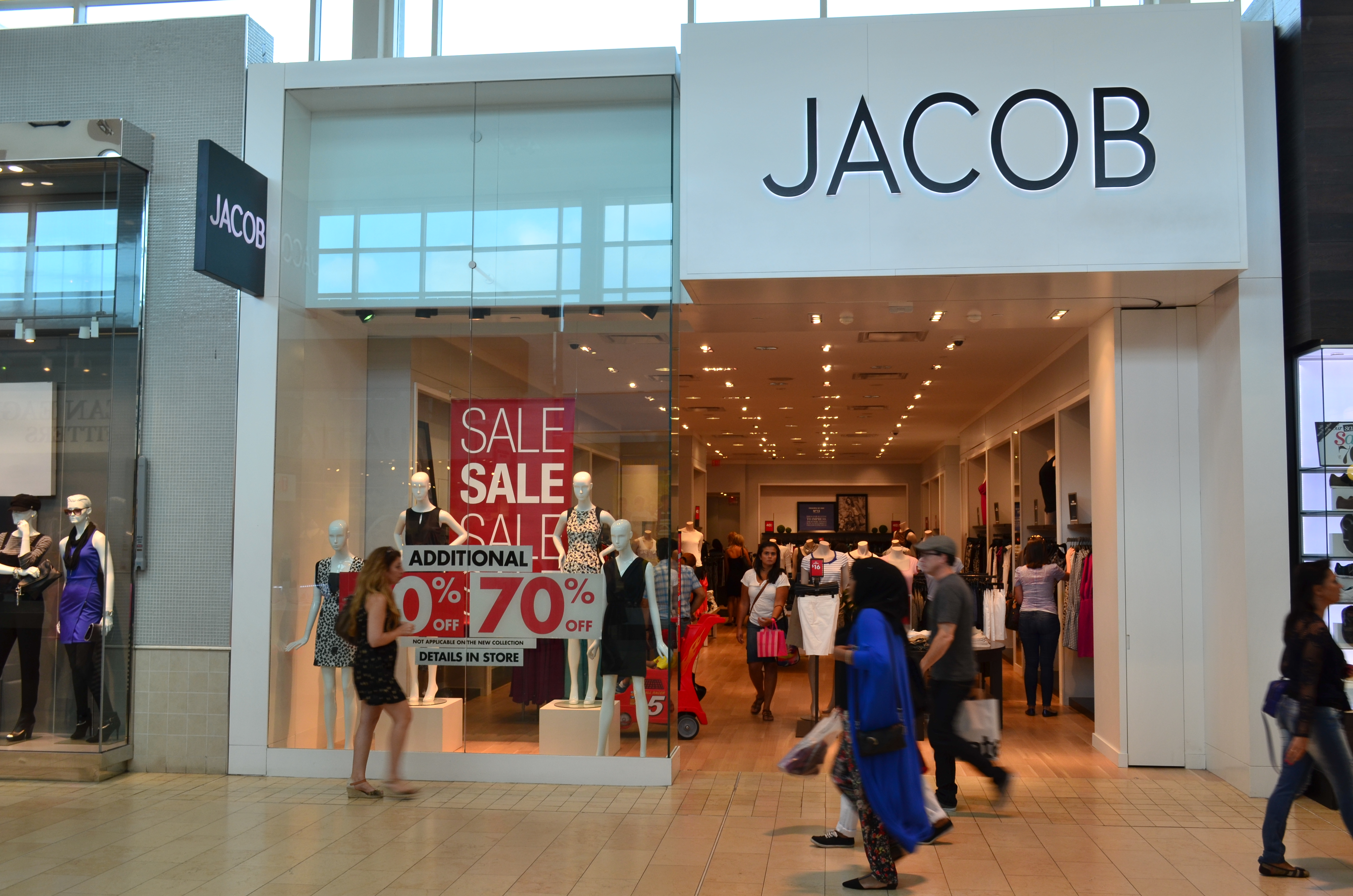
JACOB at Yorkdale Mall

Jacob (formally known as Boutique Jacob, Inc) was a private, family owned Canadian chain of women's and girls' clothing store chain based out of Montreal, Quebec. At its peak, Jacob once had over 200 stores all over Canada, usually in malls. In addition to its main brand Jacob, the company operated under the banners Jacob Connexion, Jacob Lingerie, Josef and Danz.

== Corporate history ==
Boutique Jacob launched in Sorel-Tracy in 1977. The first store outside of Quebec was opened in Toronto in 1985. Jacob opened its first US store (in Cambridge, Massachusetts) circa 2000. Jacob's flagship store was at the corner of Sainte-Catherine and Drummond streets in downtown Montreal.

In 2005, the company launched Josef, seeking an older demographic which market research suggested were more active spenders.

Jacob had begun closing locations in 2008, shuttering 52 stores with 355 staff in two years. In November 2010, the company owed to suppliers, employees and the National Bank of Canada. It received court protection from creditors, through the Quebec Superior Court and the Companies' Creditors Arrangement Act, planning to reformat its operations. The company attributed its woes to entries by international retailers into the Canadian market, including H&M and Zara, The remainder of the stores were shuttered in 2014 and online site briefly ceased operating in 2015.

In April 2015 the online site was restarted offering only their fragrance and announced plans to open a few stores in Quebec only. Jacob emerged from bankruptcy to operate five locations, all of which are located in the province of Quebec. Among these five stores is the original 1977 Sorel store and another store in Old Quebec. The other three were located in Montreal. Those stores had closed again as of early 2018.

As of 2018, the brand was selling via Costco under the brand Chic by Jacob and fragrances via their website.
