= Ministry of Government Services (Quebec) =

Government department, abolished 2011

The Ministry of Government Services (French: Ministère des Services gouvernementaux) was a government department in the Canadian province of Quebec. It oversaw the public service and facilitated citizen interaction with the government.

The department was overseen by the Ministre delégué à l'Efficacité gouvernementale et à l'Allègement règlementaire de l'État, who was a member of the Executive Council of Quebec. Before 2003, ministers who oversaw this department were styled as "minister of state for administration and the public service" and "minister responsible for administration and the public service."

In 2011, bill 130 abolished this ministry in order to cut on government expenditures.

== Service Aérien Gouvernemental ==
Service Aérien Gouvernemental operates aerial firefighting aircraft against forest fires in the province. It has a fleet of 14 Canadair water bombers. This service is now part of Transports Québec.
