= Chapleau (provincial electoral district) =

Provincial electoral district in Quebec, Canada

Coordinates: 45°29′N 75°41′W

Quebec electoral district
- Location in Gatineau

Provincial electoral district
- Legislature: National Assembly of Quebec
MNA
Michel Langevin
Liberal
- District created: 1980
- First contested: 1981
- Last contested: 2026

Demographics
- Population (2006): 72,362
- Electors (2012): 54,213
- Area (km²): 39.7
- Pop. density (per km²): 1,822.7
- Census division: Gatineau (part)
- Census subdivision: Gatineau (part)

Chapleau (French pronunciation: [ʃaplo]) is a provincial electoral district in the Outaouais region of Quebec, Canada, that elects members to the National Assembly of Quebec. It is located within the city of Gatineau.

It was created for the 1981 election from a part of Papineau electoral district.

In the change from the 2001 to the 2011 electoral map, its territory shifted slightly to the west. It gained territory west of Autoroute 50 from Gatineau electoral district, but lost some of its easternmost territory to Papineau electoral district.

It is named after former Quebec Premier Joseph-Adolphe Chapleau who was in power from 1879 to 1882.

For its first four decades, the riding was a Liberal stronghold. Located in the strongly federalist Outaouais region of West Quebec, the riding has many immigrants, federal public servants, and bilingual households, which are all demographic groups that tilt heavily towards the Liberals during provincial elections. More than 70% of the riding voted against sovereignty during the 1995 referendum.

The riding fell out of Liberal hands for the first time in 2018, when the Coalition Avenir Québec seized it en route to taking government.

== Members of the National Assembly ==
Legislature	Years	Member	Party
Riding created from Papineau
32nd	1981–1985	John Kehoe	Liberal
33rd	1985–1989	John Kehoe	Liberal
34th	1989–1994	John Kehoe	Liberal
35th	1994–1998	Claire Vaive	Liberal
36th	1998–2003	Benoît Pelletier	Liberal
37th	2003–2007	Benoît Pelletier	Liberal
38th	2007–2008	Benoît Pelletier	Liberal
39th	2008–2012	Marc Carrière	Liberal
40th	2012–2014	Marc Carrière	Liberal
41st	2014–2018	Marc Carrière	Liberal
42nd	2018–2022	Mathieu Lévesque	Coalition Avenir Québec
43rd	2022–2026	Mathieu Lévesque	Coalition Avenir Québec
44th	2026–Present	Michel Langevin	Liberal

== Election results ==
2026 Quebec general election
** Preliminary results — Not yet official **
Party	Candidate	Votes	%	±%
Liberal	Michel Langevin	12,816	37.46	+24.09
Parti Québécois	Meixia Maltais	6,740	19.70	+10.17
Coalition Avenir Québec	Mathieu Lévesque	5,652	16.52	–35.76
Conservative	Denis Charron	5,471	15.99	+5.61
Québec solidaire	Doryan Pansanel	2,911	8.51	–4.80
Green	Olguine Michelle Loussaint	288	0.84	N/A
Canadian	Marcela Martínez	286	0.84	N/A
Marxist–Leninist	Pierre Soublière	52	0.15	–0.08
Total valid votes		34,216	98.63	
Total rejected ballots		477	1.37	
Turnout		34,693	58.57	
Electors on the lists		59,230		
Liberal notional gain from Coalition Avenir Québec		Swing		+29.92
Source: Élections Québec

2022 Quebec general election redistributed results
Party	Vote	%
Coalition Avenir Québec	17,635	52.28
Liberal	4,510	13.37
Québec solidaire	4,488	13.30
Conservative	3,501	10.38
Parti Québécois	3,215	9.53
Others	386	1.14

2022 Quebec general election
Party	Candidate	Votes	%	±%
Coalition Avenir Québec	Mathieu Lévesque	16,363	52.30	+11.88
Liberal	Assumpta Ndengeyingoma	4,259	13.61	-18.96
Québec solidaire	Sabrina Labrecque-Boivin	4,129	13.20	-2.66
Conservative	Matthieu Kadri	3,161	10.10	+8.56
Parti Québécois	Marisa Gutierrez	3,033	9.70	+0.65
Climat Québec	Anne-Marie Meunier	267	0.85	–
Marxist–Leninist	Pierre Soublière	72	0.23	-0.33
Total valid votes		31,284	98.79	–
Total rejected ballots		383	1.21	–
Turnout		31,667	58.78	
Electors on the lists		53,875		

2018 Quebec general election
Party	Candidate	Votes	%	±%
Coalition Avenir Québec	Mathieu Lévesque	13,057	40.42	+25.68
Liberal	Marc Carrière	10,520	32.57	-25.26
Québec solidaire	Alexandre Albert	5,122	15.86	+10
Parti Québécois	Blake Ippersiel	2,922	9.05	-9.43
Conservative	Rowen Tanguay	497	1.54	+1.54
Marxist–Leninist	Françoise Roy	182	0.56	+0.26
Total valid votes		32,300	98.30	
Total rejected ballots		557	1.70	
Turnout		32,857	59.78	
Eligible voters		54,962		
Coalition Avenir Québec gain from Liberal		Swing		+25.47
Source(s) "Rapport des résultats officiels du scrutin". Élections Québec.

2014 Quebec general election
Party	Candidate	Votes	%	±%
Liberal	Marc Carrière	19,697	57.83	+15.70
Parti Québécois	Yves Morin	6,295	18.48	–7.53
Coalition Avenir Québec	Carl Pelletier	5,022	14.74	-8.56
Québec solidaire	Laura Avalos	1,996	5.86	+0.94
Green	Roger Fleury	693	2.03	–0.17
Option nationale	Philippe Boily	256	0.75	-0.45
Marxist–Leninist	Pierre Soublière	101	0.30	+0.06
Total valid votes		34,060	100.0	
Total rejected ballots		456	1.32	
Turnout		34,516	62.97	
Eligible voters		54,814		
Liberal hold		Swing		+5.16
Source: Élections Québec

2012 Quebec general election
Party	Candidate	Votes	%	±%
Liberal	Marc Carrière	14,812	42.13	-12.58
Parti Québécois	Yves Morin	9,146	26.01	+0.32
Coalition Avenir Québec	Luc Angers	8,191	23.30	+10.79
Québec solidaire	Benoit Renaud	1,731	4.92	+2.53
Green	Roger Fleury	774	2.20	–1.84
Option nationale	Eid Harb	421	1.20	
Marxist–Leninist	Pierre Soublière	86	0.24	+0.04
Total valid votes		35,161	100.0	
Total rejected ballots		387	1.09	
Turnout		35,548	65.32	
Eligible voters		54,425		
Liberal hold		Swing		-6.45
Change for Coalition Avenir Québec is compared to Action démocratique
Source: Élections Québec

2008 Quebec general election
Party	Candidate	Votes	%	±%
Liberal	Marc Carrière	13,968	54.71	+9.68
Parti Québécois	Yves Morin	6,560	25.69	+3.65
Action démocratique	Gilles Taillon	3,194	12.51	-12.41
Green	Roger Fleury	1,032	4.04	-1.38
Québec solidaire	Benoit Renaud	609	2.39	±0.00
Independent	Michel Soucy	118	0.46	-
Marxist–Leninist	Pierre Soublière	51	0.20	±0.00

2007 Quebec general election
Party	Candidate	Votes	%	±%
Liberal	Benoît Pelletier	14,581	45.03	-17.36
Action démocratique	Jocelyn Dumais	8,071	24.92	+11.80
Parti Québécois	Edith Gendron	7,137	22.04	+0.40
Green	Roger Fleury	1,755	5.42	-
Québec solidaire	Jennifer Jean-Brice Vales	774	2.39	+1.29*
Marxist–Leninist	Pierre Soublière	65	0.20	-0.21
* Increase is from UFP

2003 Quebec general election
Party	Candidate	Votes	%	±%
Liberal	Benoît Pelletier	18,774	62.39	+3.17
Parti Québécois	Sylvie Simard	6,512	21.64	-9.08
Action démocratique	Berthe Miron	3,949	13.12	+4.30
Bloc Pot	Daniel Leblanc-Poirier	402	1.34	-
UFP	Jean Marois	331	1.10	-
Marxist–Leninist	Gabriel Girard-Bernier	122	0.41	+0.27

1998 Quebec general election
Party	Candidate	Votes	%	±%
Liberal	Benoît Pelletier	24,228	59,22	-4.07
Parti Québécois	Claude Hallé	12,600	30.72	-0.86
Action démocratique	Serge Charette	3,617	8.82	-
Socialist Democracy	Julie Lavoie	281	0.69	-1.78
Natural Law	Jean-Claude Pommet	167	0.41	-0.15
Marxist–Leninist	Kim Roberge	59	0.14	-

1995 Quebec referendum
Side	Votes	%
Non	37,788	72.47
Oui	14,354	27.53

1994 Quebec general election
Party	Candidate	Votes	%	±%
Liberal	Claire Vaive	25,181	63.29	+8.05
Parti Québécois	Jocelyne Gadbois	12,563	31.58	-13.18
New Democrat	Steve Fortin	984	2.47	-
Lemon	Alain Lafortune	618	1.55	-
Natural Law	Marie-Thérèse Nault	222	0.56	-
Independent	Jean-Pierre Winter	219	0.55	-

1992 Charlottetown Accord referendum
Side	Votes	%
Oui	23,968	58.29
Non	17,153	41.71

1989 Quebec general election
Party	Candidate	Votes	%	±%
Liberal	John J. Kehoe	15,569	55.24	-5.25
Parti Québécois	Jean Alfred	12,615	44.76	+8.81

1985 Quebec general election
Party	Candidate	Votes	%	±%
Liberal	John J. Kehoe	16,154	60.49	+7.09
Parti Québécois	Jean-Claude Charette	9,813	35.95	-8.85
New Democrat	Jean-Philippe Rheault	686	2.51	-
Parti Indépendantiste	Marcel Vaive	188	0.69	
Christian Socialist	Stéphane Plouffe	99	0.36	-

1981 Quebec general election
Party	Candidate	Votes	%
Liberal	John J. Kehoe	15,364	53.44
Parti Québécois	Jean Alfred	12,880	44.80
Union Nationale	André Lortie	413	1.43
Marxist–Leninist	Christine Dandenault	95	0.33

== See also ==
- List of Quebec provincial electoral districts
- Canadian provincial electoral districts
