= Minister responsible for the Outaouais (Quebec) =

The Minister responsible for the Outaouais is a ministerial designation in the government of Quebec. The minister who holds this position is responsible for overseeing government matters in the Outaouais region, along Quebec's border with Ontario. It is not a full ministerial portfolio, and it is generally held by a minister who also has other cabinet responsibilities.

The current minister is Mathieu Lacombe, who is also the Minister of Families.
