= Pierre Nantel =

Canadian politician

Pierre Nantel MNA
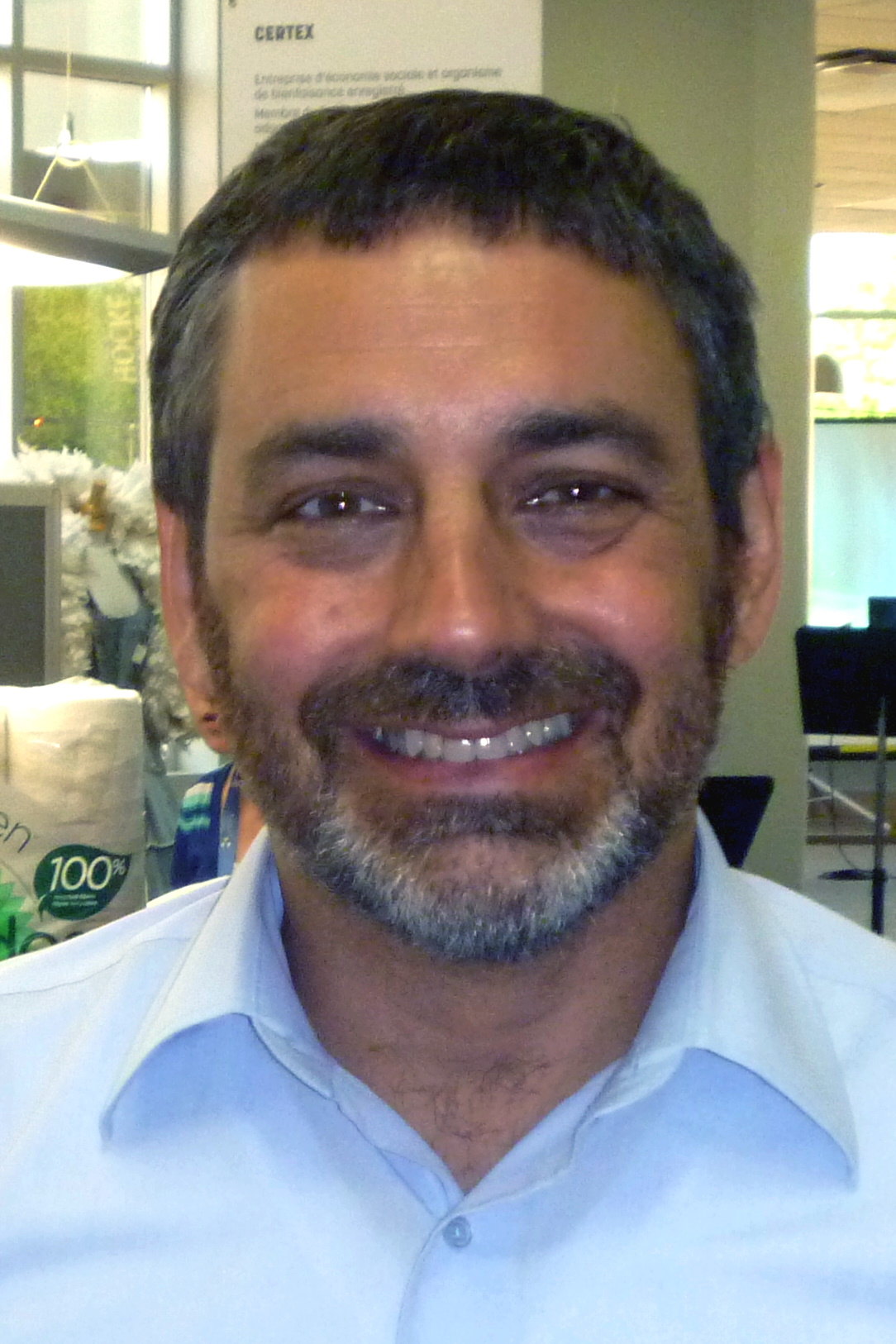

Member of the National Assembly for Argenteuil
- Incumbent
- Assumed office October 5, 2026
- Premier: Paul St-Pierre Plamondon
- Preceded by: Agnès Grondin

Member of Parliament for Longueuil—Saint-Hubert Longueuil—Pierre-Boucher (2011–2015)
- In office May 2, 2011 – October 21, 2019
- Preceded by: Jean Dorion
- Succeeded by: Denis Trudel

Personal details
- Born: June 10, 1963 (age 63) Salaberry-de-Valleyfield, Quebec, Canada
- Party: Parti Québécois (since 2021)
- Other political affiliations: Green (2019–2021); Independent (2019–2019); New Democratic (2011–2019)
- Profession: Artistic director; researcher; commentator

Pierre Nantel (born June 10, 1963) is a Canadian politician from Quebec. He is a member of the National Assembly of Quebec and a former member of the House of Commons of Canada. First elected in the 2011 federal election as a member of the New Democratic Party (NDP), he succeeded Jean Dorion of the Bloc Québécois in the district of Longueuil—Pierre-Boucher; in the 2015 election, he was reelected in the redistributed riding of Longueuil—Saint-Hubert.

Prior to being elected, Nantel was a researcher and television commentator, including a stint at Radio-Canada television.

On August 16, 2019, the NDP dropped Nantel from its caucus, and as a candidate in the upcoming 2019 Canadian federal election, following revelations that he had been in private talks to run for another political party in the 2019 federal election. Although Nantel had previously been speculated as potentially joining the Bloc Québécois, the reports that sparked his removal from the NDP caucus indicated that he was in talks with the Green Party of Canada. On August 19, 2019, it was announced that Nantel would sit as an independent MP for the rest of his term and would be running under the Green Party banner in the 2019 federal election. He was defeated in the election, placing third behind the Bloc Québécois and Liberal candidates.

Despite having previously run for federalist parties, he announced in 2021 that he would be the Parti Québécois candidate in the then-upcoming by-election in Marie-Victorin. He lost to CAQ candidate Shirley Dorismond on April 11, 2022.

At the 2026 Quebec general election, Nantel was elected MNA for Argenteuil.

== Electoral record ==
2026 Quebec general election: Argenteuil
** Preliminary results — Not yet official **
Party	Candidate	Votes	%	±%
Parti Québécois	Pierre Nantel	8,956	33.14	+16.93
Liberal	Émilie Jutras	6,923	25.61	+15.43
Conservative	Marie-France Lemay	5,437	20.12	+5.40
Coalition Avenir Québec	Julie-Andrée Numainville	3,096	11.45	–33.65
Québec solidaire	Pénéloppe Dagenais-Lavoie	1,880	6.96	–3.83
Independent	Brigitte Roy	415	1.54	N/A
Canadian	Esber Khalil Esber	122	0.45	–0.89
Independent	Margaret Ethel Brunton	102	0.38	N/A
Osons Québec	Martin Charron	97	0.36	N/A
Total valid votes		27,028	98.46	–0.05
Total rejected ballots		422	1.54	+0.05
Turnout		43,063	63.74	–0.43
Electors on the lists		43,063		
Parti Québécois gain from Coalition Avenir Québec		Swing		+0.75
Source: Élections Québec

2022 Quebec general election: Marie-Victorin
Party	Candidate	Votes	%	±%
Coalition Avenir Québec	Shirley Dorismond	9,212	33.11	-1.84
Parti Québécois	Pierre Nantel	6,913	24.85	-5.22
Québec solidaire	Shophika Vaithyanathasarma	6,307	22.67	+8.46
Liberal	Lyes Chekal	2,793	10.04	+3.11
Conservative	Lara Stillo	1,952	7.02	-3.38
Green	Vincent Aquin-Belleau	308	1.11	+0.24
Climat Québec	Martine Ouellet	260	0.93	-0.97
Marxist–Leninist	Pierre Chénier	48	0.17	–
Équipe Autonomiste	Florent Portron	27	0.10	+0.03
Total valid votes		27,820	98.52	–
Total rejected ballots		418	1.48	–
Turnout		28,238	61.64	+25.51
Electors on the lists		48,810	–	–

Quebec provincial by-election, April 11, 2022: Marie-Victorin Resignation of Catherine Fournier
Party	Candidate	Votes	%	±%
Coalition Avenir Québec	Shirley Dorismond	5,697	34.95	+6.56
Parti Québécois	Pierre Nantel	4,902	30.07	-0.74
Québec solidaire	Shophika Vaithyanathasarma	2,316	14.21	-7.46
Conservative	Anne Casabonne	1,696	10.40	–
Liberal	Émilie Nollet	1,130	6.93	-8.28
Climat Québec	Martine Ouellet	310	1.90	–
Green	Alex Tyrrell	142	0.87	-1.28
Accès propriété et équité	Shawn Lalande McLean	42	0.26	–
Indépendance du Québec	Michel Blondin	21	0.13	–
Union Nationale	Michel Lebrun	17	0.10	–
Independent	Philippe Tessier	17	0.10	–
Équipe Autonomiste	Florent Portron	11	0.07	-0.09
Total valid votes		16,301	98.86	+0.70
Total rejected ballots		188	1.14	-0.70
Turnout		16,489	36.13	-26.78
Electors on the lists		45,636	–	
Source: Élections Québec
Coalition Avenir Québec gain from Parti Québécois		Swing		+3.65

2019 Canadian federal election: Longueuil—Saint-Hubert
Party	Candidate	Votes	%	±%	Expenditures
Bloc Québécois	Denis Trudel	23,061	38.5	+11.23	$46,039.85
Liberal	Réjean Hébert	20,471	34.2	+4.19	$77,307.46
Green	Pierre Nantel	6,745	11.3	+8.81	$16,474.78
New Democratic	Éric Ferland	5,104	8.5	–22.72	$11,119.46
Conservative	Patrick Clune	3,779	6.3	–2.44	none listed
People's	Ellen Comeau	467	0.8	–	$0.00
Independent	Pierre-Luc Fillon	217	0.4	–	$0.00
Total valid votes/expense limit		59,844	100.0		
Total rejected ballots		1,086			
Turnout		60,930	69.9		
Eligible voters		87,113			
Bloc Québécois gain from Independent		Swing		–	
Source: Elections Canada
Note: Pierre Nantel was the incumbent MP who was elected in 2015 as a New Democrat, but sat as an independent after August 16, 2019. Nantel decided to run again as the Green candidate in the 2019 election, but never joined the Green caucus while the 42nd Parliament was in session.

2015 Canadian federal election: Longueuil—Saint-Hubert
Party	Candidate	Votes	%	±%	Expenditures
New Democratic	Pierre Nantel	18,171	31.22	-18.79	–
Liberal	Mick O'Grady	17,468	30.01	+19.92	–
Bloc Québécois	Denis Trudel	15,873	27.27	-1.52	–
Conservative	John Sedlak	5,087	8.74	+0.00	–
Green	Casandra Poitras	1,447	2.49	+0.29	–
Strength in Democracy	Affine Lwalalika	153	0.26	–	–
Total valid votes/Expense limit		58,199	100.00		$224,513.21
Total rejected ballots		939	1.59	–	
Turnout		85,766	68.95	–	
Eligible voters		85,766			
New Democratic notional hold		Swing		-19.36	
Source: Elections Canada

2011 Canadian federal election: Longueuil—Pierre-Boucher
Party	Candidate	Votes	%	±%	Expenditures
New Democratic	Pierre Nantel	27,119	51.93	+37.9	
Bloc Québécois	Jean Dorion	14,181	27.16	-18.9	
Liberal	Kévan Falsafi	5,321	10.19	-11.6	
Conservative	Richard Bélisle	4,339	8.31	-6.1	
Green	Valérie St-Amant	1,032	1.98	-1.5	
Marxist–Leninist	Serge Patenaude	228	0.44	+0.2	
Total valid votes/Expense limit		52,220	100.00		
Total rejected ballots		650	1.23	-0.11	
Turnout		52,870	67.24	–	
Eligible voters		78,629	–	–	
New Democratic gain from Bloc Québécois		Swing		+28.4	
