= Anne Casabonne =

Canadian actress and politician

- Born: January 9, 1970 (age 56)
- Education: Université du Québec à Montréal
- Occupations: Actress, politician
- Years active: 1991–2021; 2022-present
- Political party: Conservative
- Children: 1

Anne Casabonne (born January 9, 1970) is a Canadian actress and politician known for her roles as Claude Milonga in La Galère, Annie Surprenant in Unité 9, and Hélène in Complexe G.

== Early life and career ==
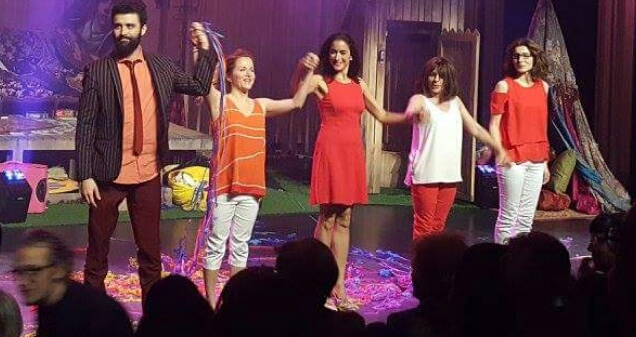
Casabonne in 2016 after a showing of La galère sur scène.

Casabonne lost both her parents at an early age; her father at 15, and her mother at 21. She is the sister of multidisciplinary artist Jean-François Casabonne. Casabonne studied at the Université du Québec à Montréal in Interpretive Dramatic Arts between 1988 and 1991.

She first entered the acting world in the 1990s in the show Les Zigotos where she played, among others, the role of Nadine Trudeau and M.twit. She then played the role of Cléo in the popular youth show Macaroni tout garni which was broadcast on Télé-Québec. She played the role of Claude in the series La Galère, which was broadcast from 2007 to 2013 on Ici Radio-Canada Télé. From 2013 to 2019, she played in the drama TV series Unité 9, and in 2015 hosted Déco Top Chrono on Canal Vie.

From 2014 until the spring of 2021, she was a spokesperson for Accès pharma, a pharmacy network owned by Walmart.

In September 2021, the actress announced that she was "taking a break" from acting following a controversy regarding comments made in a Facebook post, in which she criticized the COVID-19 vaccine, François Legault and Christian Dubé, calling them "clowns." Subsequently, Walmart Canada publicly dissociated itself from her comments.

== Entry into politics ==
On January 17, 2022, Casabonne announced that she had joined the Conservative Party of Quebec and would be its candidate for the upcoming by-election in the riding of Marie-Victorin. She came in fourth place with 10.41% of the total vote, which, despite losing, was hailed as a strong performance for the party as she surpassed the number of votes given to the Quebec Liberal Party. On June 21, 2022, it was announced that Casabonne would run in the 2022 Quebec general election in the riding of Iberville. The seat was held by Claire Samson, the only Conservative MNA at the time.

== Personal life ==
Casabonne has a son, who she gave birth to four months after the passing of her mother.

== Filmography ==
=== Film ===
Year	Title	Role	Notes
1998	When I Will Be Gone (L'Âge de braise)	Employee	
2004	Machine Gun Molly (Monica la mitraille)	Paula	
2004	Elvis Gratton XXX: La Vengeance d'Elvis Wong	Hélène	
2006	Family History (Histoire de famille)	Chantal	
2014	The Masters of Suspense (Les Maîtres du suspense)	Béatrice Cabana	
2015	Snowtime! (La Guerre des tuques 3D)	Maranda	Voice
2019	Forgotten Flowers (Les Fleurs oubliées)	Bourgeoise Aysha	
2021	Livrés chez vous sans contact	Bunny's Wife & Radio Host	
2022	Arlette	Christine Petit	
2023	Purgatory (Le purgatoire des intimes)	Marie-Catherine Denoncourt	

=== Television ===
Year	Title	Role	Notes
1994-1998	Les Zigotos	Host	Game show
1998-2004	Macaroni tout garni	Cléo the Florist	
2007-2013	La Galère	Claude Milonga	
2010	Trauma	Céline Paquin	2 episodes
2011	30 vies	Alexandra Pagé	Season 2
2013-2019	Unité 9	Annie Surprenant	
2014	Complexe G	Hélène	
2015	Déco top chrono	Herself	
2015	Switch and Bitch	Chantale	Web-series
2017	Mère & Fille	Isabelle	Web-series
2017-2020	L'Échappée	Cécile Nault	
2021	District 31	Patricia Ledoux	
2021	Virage	Jojo Ménard	
2021	Sans Rendez-Vous	Roxane	

== Electoral record ==
2022 Quebec general election: Iberville
Party	Candidate	Votes	%	±%
Coalition Avenir Québec	Audrey Bogemans			
Parti Québécois	Jean-Alexandre Côté			
Québec solidaire	Philippe Jetten-Vigeant			
Conservative	Anne Casabonne			
Liberal	Steve Trinque			
Climat Québec	Philippe Brassard			–
Démocratie directe	Jean-Charles Cléroux			–
Total valid votes			–	
Total rejected ballots			–	
Turnout				
Electors on the lists			–	–

Quebec provincial by-election, April 11, 2022: Marie-Victorin Resignation of Catherine Fournier
Party	Candidate	Votes	%	±%
Coalition Avenir Québec	Shirley Dorismond	5,697	34.95	+6.56
Parti Québécois	Pierre Nantel	4,902	30.07	-0.74
Québec solidaire	Shophika Vaithyanathasarma	2,316	14.21	-7.46
Conservative	Anne Casabonne	1,696	10.40	–
Liberal	Émilie Nollet	1,130	6.93	-8.28
Climat Québec	Martine Ouellet	310	1.90	–
Green	Alex Tyrrell	142	0.87	-1.28
Accès propriété et équité	Shawn Lalande McLean	42	0.26	–
Indépendance du Québec	Michel Blondin	21	0.13	–
Union Nationale	Michel Lebrun	17	0.10	–
Independent	Philippe Tessier	17	0.10	–
Équipe Autonomiste	Florent Portron	11	0.07	-0.09
Total valid votes		16,301	98.86	+0.70
Total rejected ballots		188	1.14	-0.70
Turnout		16,489	36.13	-26.78
Electors on the lists		45,636	–	
Source: Élections Québec
Coalition Avenir Québec gain from Parti Québécois		Swing		+3.65
