= Shirley Dorismond =

Canadian politician

Member of the National Assembly of Quebec for Marie-Victorin
- In office April 11, 2022 – August 27, 2026
- Preceded by: Catherine Fournier
- Succeeded by: Nicolas Marceau

Personal details
- Party: Coalition Avenir Québec

Shirley Dorismond is a Canadian politician and former union leader and nurse, who represented the electoral district of Marie-Victorin in the National Assembly of Quebec. She is a member of the Coalition Avenir Québec (CAQ), winning a 2022 by-election following the resignation of the former MNA Catherine Fournier. She is the first CAQ MNA for Marie-Victorin, as the district had been a Parti Québécois (PQ) stronghold since its creation in 1980, with only a one-year gap in 1984 when the Liberal party won a byelection, until Fournier left the PQ in 2019.

She previously worked as a nurse, and served as the vice-president of the Fédération interprofessionnelle de la santé du Québec (FIQ), a union representing nearly 75,000 nurses, nursing assistants, respiratory therapists and clinical perfusionists working in health establishments across Quebec.

== Electoral record ==
2022 Quebec general election: Marie-Victorin
Party	Candidate	Votes	%	±%
Coalition Avenir Québec	Shirley Dorismond	9,212	33.11	-1.84
Parti Québécois	Pierre Nantel	6,913	24.85	-5.22
Québec solidaire	Shophika Vaithyanathasarma	6,307	22.67	+8.46
Liberal	Lyes Chekal	2,793	10.04	+3.11
Conservative	Lara Stillo	1,952	7.02	-3.38
Green	Vincent Aquin-Belleau	308	1.11	+0.24
Climat Québec	Martine Ouellet	260	0.93	-0.97
Marxist–Leninist	Pierre Chénier	48	0.17	–
Équipe Autonomiste	Florent Portron	27	0.10	+0.03
Total valid votes		27,820	98.52	–
Total rejected ballots		418	1.48	–
Turnout		28,238	61.64	+25.51
Electors on the lists		48,810	–	–

Quebec provincial by-election, April 11, 2022: Marie-Victorin Resignation of Catherine Fournier
Party	Candidate	Votes	%	±%
Coalition Avenir Québec	Shirley Dorismond	5,697	34.95	+6.56
Parti Québécois	Pierre Nantel	4,902	30.07	-0.74
Québec solidaire	Shophika Vaithyanathasarma	2,316	14.21	-7.46
Conservative	Anne Casabonne	1,696	10.40	–
Liberal	Émilie Nollet	1,130	6.93	-8.28
Climat Québec	Martine Ouellet	310	1.90	–
Green	Alex Tyrrell	142	0.87	-1.28
Accès propriété et équité	Shawn Lalande McLean	42	0.26	–
Indépendance du Québec	Michel Blondin	21	0.13	–
Union Nationale	Michel Lebrun	17	0.10	–
Independent	Philippe Tessier	17	0.10	–
Équipe Autonomiste	Florent Portron	11	0.07	-0.09
Total valid votes		16,301	98.86	+0.70
Total rejected ballots		188	1.14	-0.70
Turnout		16,489	36.13	-26.78
Electors on the lists		45,636	–	
Source: Élections Québec
Coalition Avenir Québec gain from Parti Québécois		Swing		+3.65
