= 2017 Bloc Québécois leadership election =

Political party leadership election in Canada

- March 14, 2017
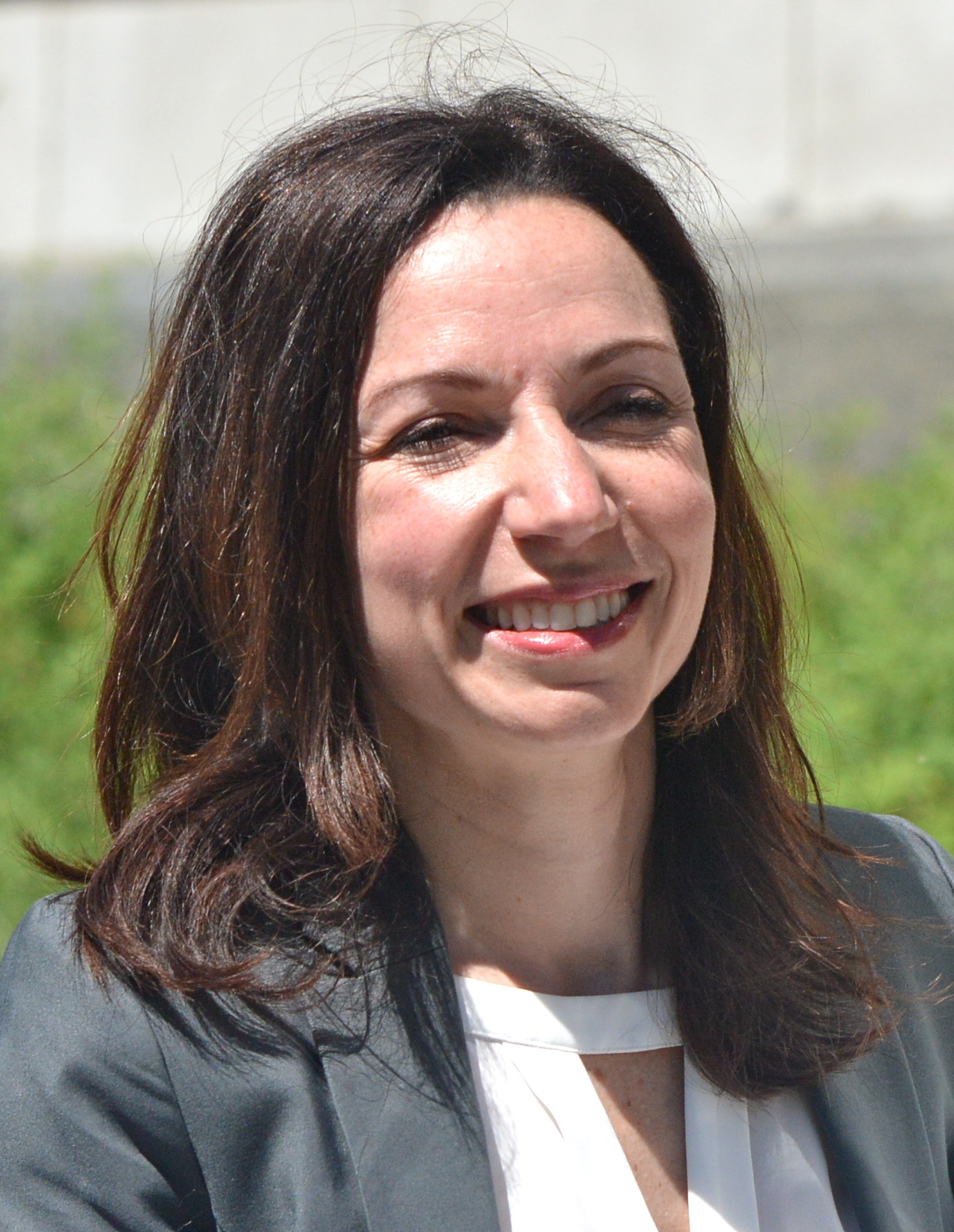
Candidate	Martine Ouellet
Riding	Vachon (Provincial)
Votes	Acclaimed
Percentage	Acclaimed
Leader before election
Rhéal Fortin (interim)
Elected Leader
Martine Ouellet

2017 Bloc Québécois leadership election
- Date: March 14, 2017
- Resigning leader: Gilles Duceppe
- Won by: Martine Ouellet
- Ballots: acclamation
- Candidates: 1
- Entrance fee: $15,000 CDN

The 2017 Bloc Québécois leadership election was held on March 14, 2017 to choose a successor to Gilles Duceppe, who resigned on October 22, 2015 after the 2015 Canadian federal election. Rhéal Fortin, MP for Rivière-du-Nord, had been serving as interim leader since Duceppe's resignation. The election was initially scheduled for April 22, 2017 but ended on March 14, 2017 at the end of the nomination period, because there was only one candidate. Ouellet's tenure was controversial due to her staunch separatist views, and, following a leadership vote, she was forced to resign in June 2018.

== Timeline ==
- October 19, 2015 – The 2015 federal election is held. While the Bloc wins 10 seats, up from the 2 it had held going into the election, party leader Gilles Duceppe loses his comeback attempt in Laurier—Sainte-Marie.
- October 22, 2015 – Duceppe resigns as party leader, with Rivière-du-Nord MP Rhéal Fortin being appointed interim leader in his place.
- February 2016 – A motion by MPs Xavier Barsalou-Duval and Mario Beaulieu challenging Fortin's right to run for permanent leader is defeated by the parliamentary caucus by a vote of 5 to 4, with Fortin himself abstaining.
- December 7, 2016 – Fortin announces that he will not seek permanent leadership of the party.
- February 4, 2017 – The Bloc general council announces the election rules. Nomination period opens.
- March 14, 2017 – Nomination period ends, with only one candidate, Martine Ouellet, having fulfilled the nomination requirements.
- March 18, 2017 – Ouellet is officially acclaimed as the next leader of the Bloc Québécois.

== Candidate ==
=== Martine Ouellet ===
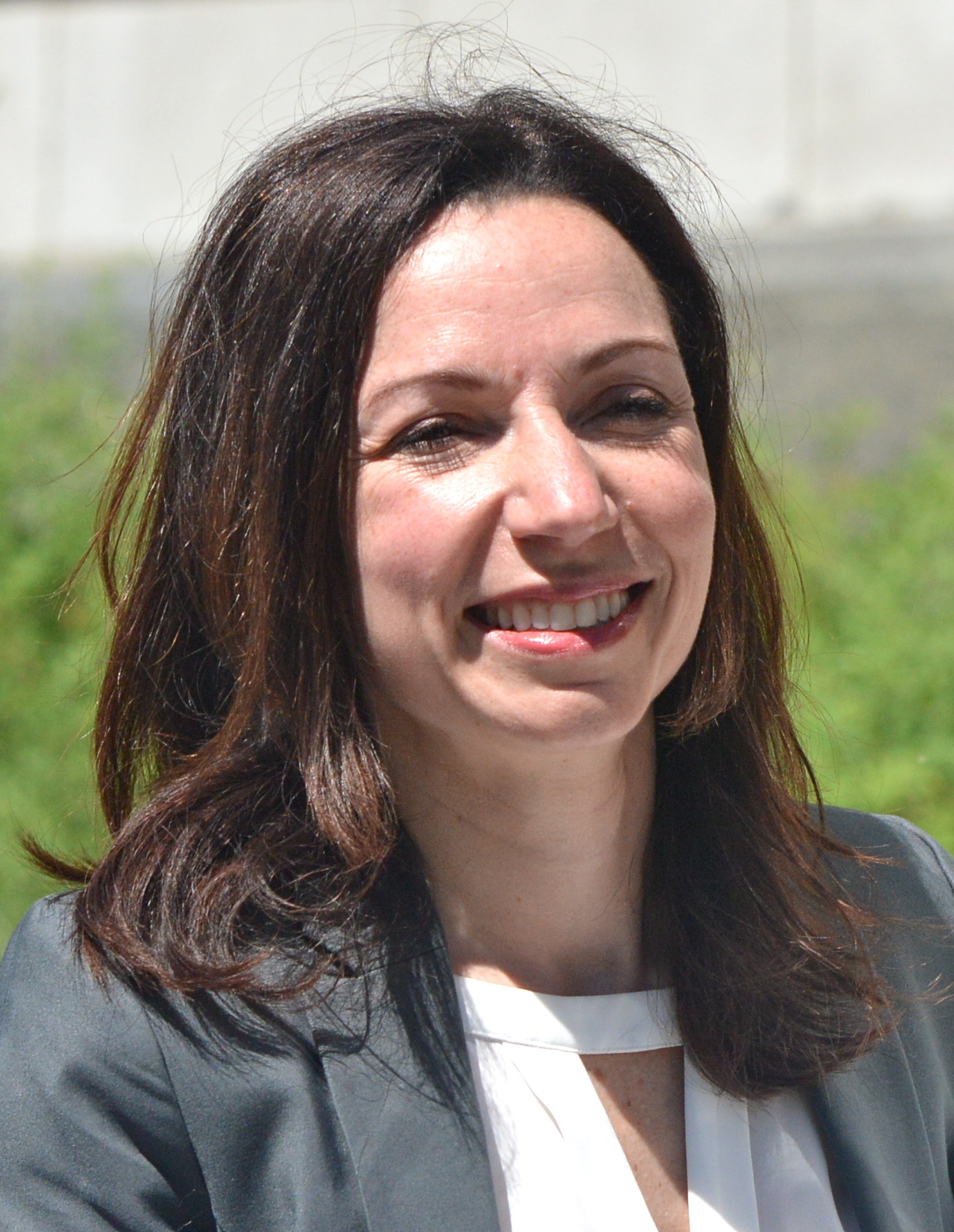
Martine Ouellet

Martine Ouellet, 47, is the Parti Québécois MNA for Vachon (2010–2018) and former Quebec Minister of Natural Resources and Wildlife (2012–2014). She placed third in the 2015 and 2016 Parti Québécois leadership elections.

Date campaign announced: February 5, 2017
Date campaign launched: March 12, 2017
Campaign website: martineouellet.quebec

Endorsements

- MPs: (6) Xavier Barsalou-Duval (Pierre-Boucher—Les Patriotes—Verchères), Michel Boudrias (Terrebonne), Marilène Gill (Manicouagan), Simon Marcil (Mirabel), Monique Pauzé (Repentigny), Gabriel Ste-Marie (Joliette)
- Provincial politicians: (1) Claude Cousineau (MNA for Bertrand)
- Former provincial politicians: (1) Gilbert Paquette (MNA for Rosemont, 1976–1985, and 2015 Bloc candidate in LaSalle—Émard—Verdun)
- Other prominent individuals: (3) Catherine Bouchard-Tremblay (2016 Option nationale provincial candidate in Chicoutimi), Sophie Stanké (2015 Bloc candidate in Châteauguay—Lacolle), Denis Trudel (comedian and 2015 BQ candidate in Longueuil—Saint-Hubert).

== Failed to qualify ==
=== Félix Pinel ===
Félix Pinel, a teacher, ran as the Bloc candidate in Rivière-des-Mille-Îles in 2015. He announced his intention of running on February 1, 2017, but failed to obtain the required number of signatures before the end of the nomination period.

Date campaign announced: February 1, 2017
Campaign website: www.facebook.com/felixpinelQc/

== Declined ==
- Jean-Martin Aussant, former Option nationale leader (2011–2013), MNA for Nicolet-Yamaska (2008–2012)
- Xavier Barsalou-Duval, MP for Pierre-Boucher—Les Patriotes—Verchères (2015–present), president of the Forum jeunesse du Bloc Québécois (2011–2015)
- Mario Beaulieu, party president (2014–2018), former Bloc leader (2014–2015), MP for La Pointe-de-l'Île (2015–present), leader of the Société Saint-Jean-Baptiste (2009–2014).
- Yves-François Blanchet, former Quebec Minister of Sustainable Development, Environment, Wildlife and Parks (2012–2014), Parti Québécois MNA for Johnson (2012–2014) and Drummond (2008–2012).
- Martine Desjardins, activist, political commentator, and 2014 Parti Québécois candidate in Groulx.
- Rhéal Fortin, interim Bloc leader (2015–2017), MP for Rivière-du-Nord (2015–present).
- Catherine Fournier, economist, 2015 candidate in Montarville.
- Denis Trudel, comedian, 2015 candidate in Longueuil—Saint-Hubert.

== Results ==
Being the only candidate, Martine Ouellet won the election by default at the end of the nomination period, on March 14, 2017. She was officially named leader on March 18, 2017.
