= 2015 Parti Québécois leadership election =

- 13–15 May 2015
- Turnout: 79.9%
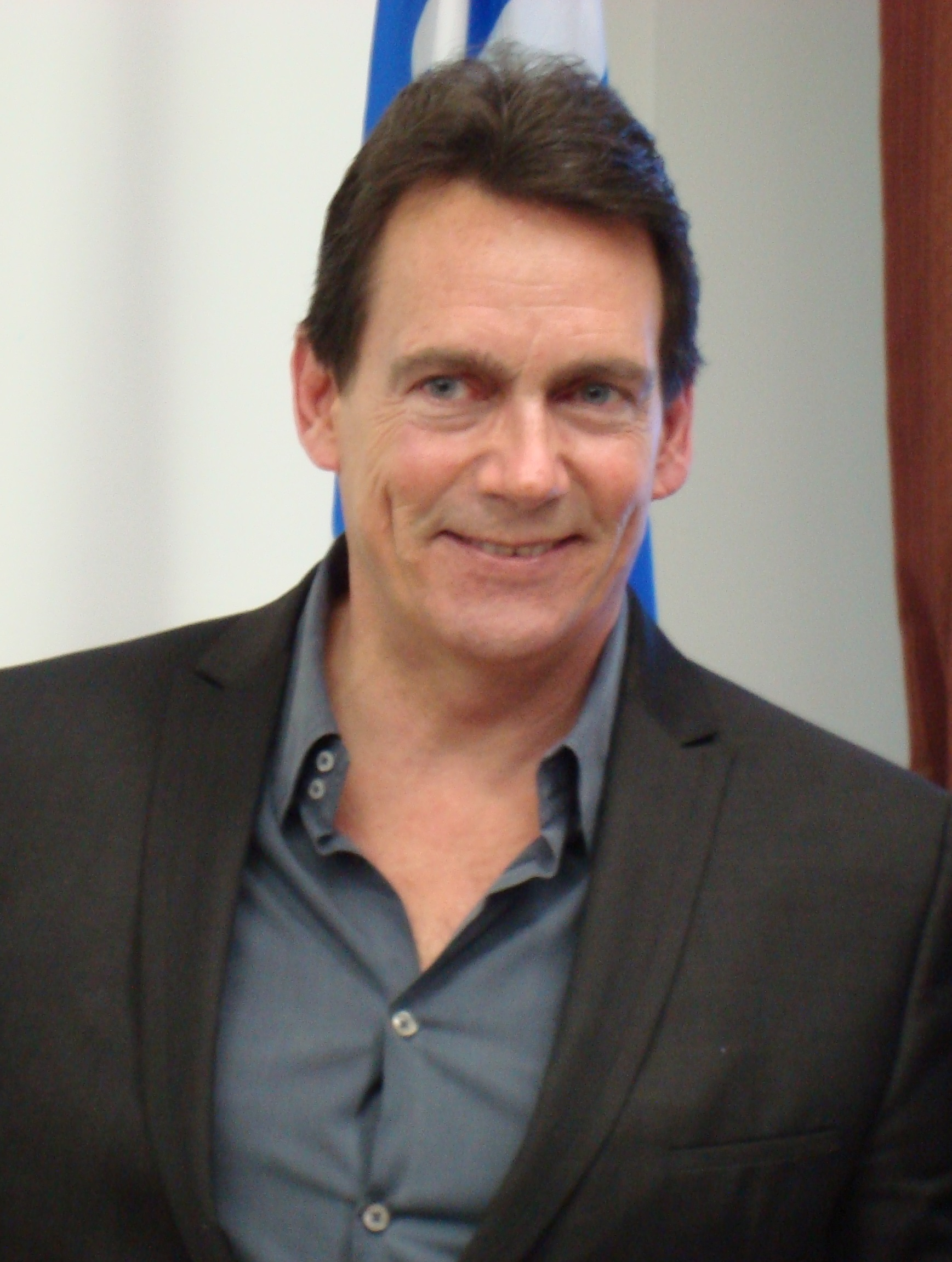

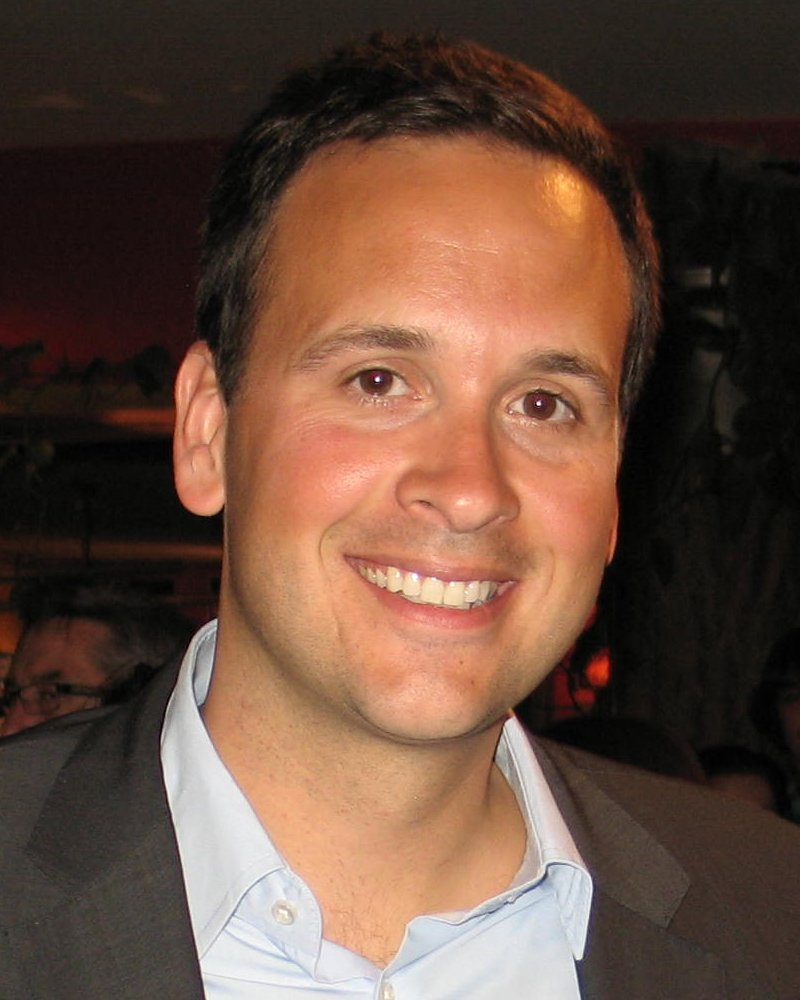

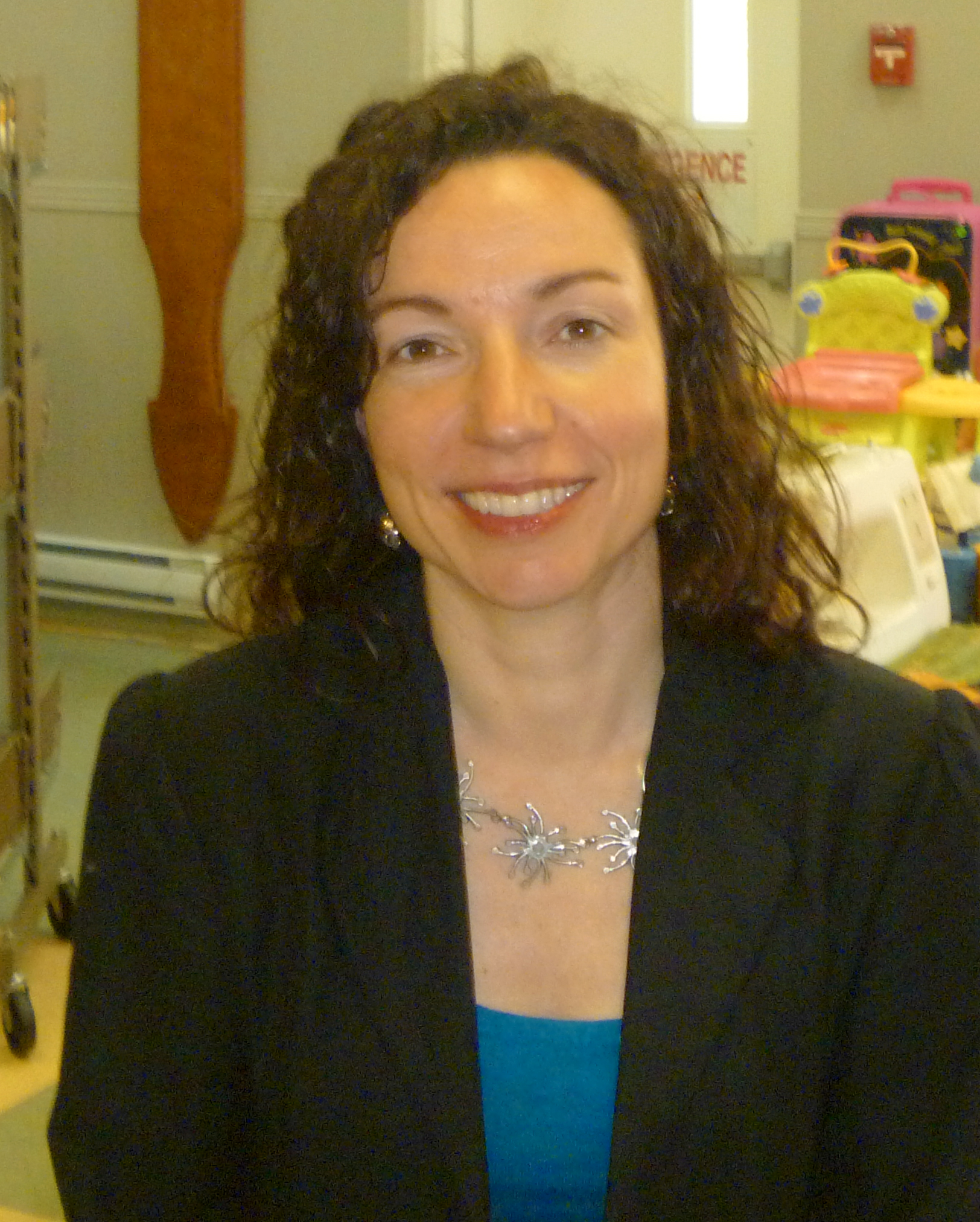
Candidate	Pierre Karl Péladeau	Alexandre Cloutier	Martine Ouellet
Party	Parti Québécois	Parti Québécois	Parti Québécois
Percentage	57.58%	29.21%	13.21%
Leader before election
Stéphane Bédard (interim)
Elected Leader
Pierre Karl Péladeau

2015 Parti Québécois leadership election
- Date: May 13–15, 2015
- Resigning leader: Pauline Marois
- Won by: Pierre Karl Péladeau
- Ballots: 1
- Candidates: 3
- Entrance fee: $20,000
- Spending limit: $400,000

The 2015 Parti Québécois leadership election was held from May 13 to May 15, 2015 as a result of the resignation of Parti Québécois leader Pauline Marois after the defeat of her government in the April 7, 2014 provincial election.

== Procedure ==
The election was conducted using a one member, one vote formula. Each member of the Parti Quebecois was allowed to vote by phone or on the web from May 13 until May 15. If there is not a majority for a candidate (50% +1) on the first ballot, there will be a run-off ballot between the two candidates who had the most votes on the first ballot. If a second ballot was required, it would have been held from May 20 until May 22. To be nominated, a candidate needed to collect 2,000 signatures aggregated from 50 ridings, in 10 regions and pay $20,000 to be listed on the first ballot. If there were a second ballot, candidates would have had to pay an additional $5,000. The spending limit was $400,000. A proposal to allow a vote open to non-members was defeated.

== Timeline ==
- April 7, 2014: General election results in the defeat of the incumbent PQ government. Pauline Marois, who lost her seat in the National Assembly of Quebec, announces that she will be resigning as party leader.
- April 10, 2014: Stéphane Bédard chosen interim parliamentary leader by the PQ caucus.
- May 13, 2014: Former Bloc Québécois leader Gilles Duceppe announces he will not be a candidate for the PQ leadership despite polls showing him to be the most popular choice of the potential candidates.
- June 7, 2014: Marois' resignation takes effect; Parti Québécois Council of Presidents meets to discuss the party's future course and the timing and rules for the leadership election. A decision on setting a date for the election was deferred until the fall. A proposal was made to hold an open primary in which all Quebeckers could vote for the party's leader.
- October 4, 2014: PQ riding association presidents met in Sherbrooke, Quebec to decide rules and timeline for leadership election.
- October 14, 2014: Nomination period opens.
- October 14, 2014: Martine Ouellet declares her candidacy.
- October 20, 2014: Bernard Drainville declares his candidacy.
- October 21, 2014: Pierre Céré declares his candidacy.
- October 27, 2014: Alexandre Cloutier declares his candidacy.
- October 31, 2014: Jean-François Lisée declares his candidacy.
- November 27, 2014: Pierre Karl Péladeau declares his candidacy.
- January 23, 2015: Lisée withdraws.
- January 30, 2015: Deadline for candidates to be nominated.
- March 11, 2015: First official debate is held in Trois-Rivières
- April 1, 2015: Second debate is held in Sherbrooke
- April 15, 2015: Third debate is held in Quebec City
- April 22, 2015: Drainville withdraws, endorses Péladeau.
- May 3, 2015: Fourth debate is held in Rimouski
- May 7, 2015: Fifth debate will be held in Montreal
- May 10, 2015: Céré withdraws, endorses Ouellet and Cloutier.
- May 13–15, 2015: First ballot voting
- May 15, 2015, 9pm: First ballot results announced at the Quebec City Convention Centre

== Declared candidates ==
=== Alexandre Cloutier ===
Background

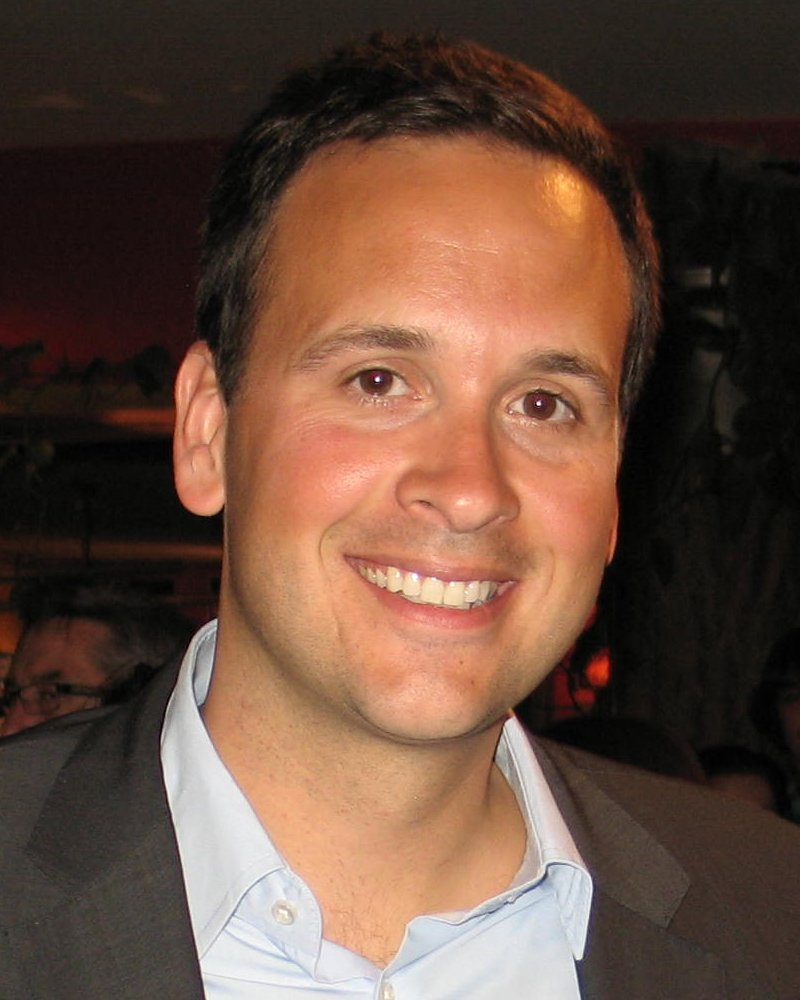
Alexandre Cloutier, MNA for Lac-Saint-Jean

MNA for Lac-Saint-Jean (2007–2018), Minister for Canadian Intergovernmental Affairs, the Canadian Francophonie and Sovereignist Governance (2012–2014).

Date candidacy declared: October 27, 2014
Supporters
Support from caucus members: (3) Gaétan Lelièvre, Véronique Hivon, François Gendron
Support from former caucus members: (9) Louise Harel, Louise Beaudoin, Stéphan Tremblay, Léo Bureau-Blouin, Jean-Marie Claveau, Henri Lemay, Denis Trottier, Cécile Vermette
Other prominent supporters: Richard Nadeau (former MP), Serge Ménard (former MP), Claude Patry (MP)
Policies: Wants to PQ to stop being a "carbon copy" of the past and has stated education and youth is his top priority.

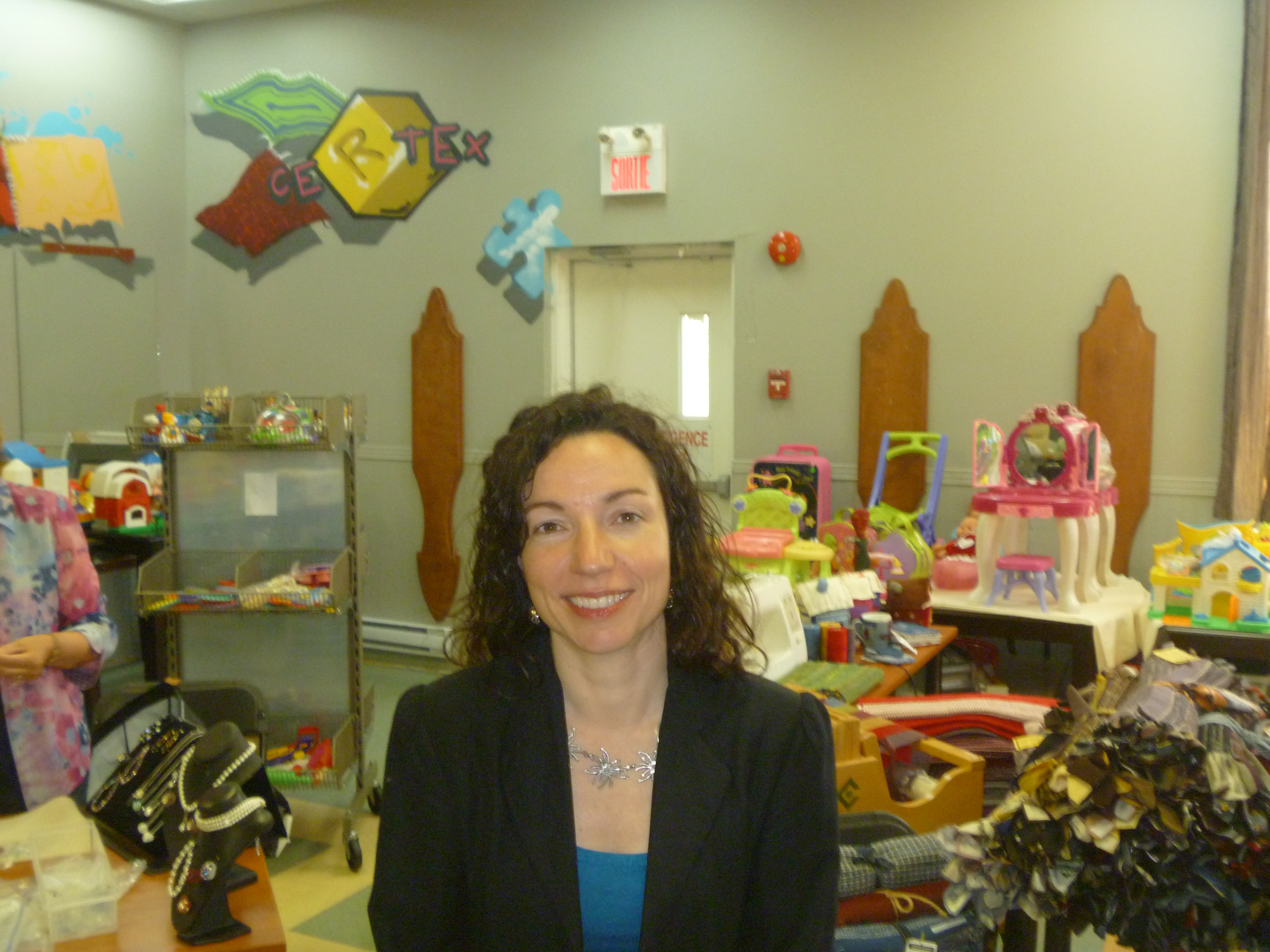
Martine Ouellet, MNA for Vachon

=== Martine Ouellet ===
Background

MNA for Vachon (2010–2018), Minister of Natural Resources and Wildlife (2012–2014). An engineer by training.

Date candidacy declared: October 14, 2014
Supporters
Support from caucus members:
Support from former caucus members: (3) Émilien Pelletier, André Gaulin
Other prominent supporters: France Bonsant (former MP), Thierry St-Cyr (former MP), Sylvie Legault (2014 candidate in Mercier), Michel Parent (president of Montreal’s blue collar workers’ union), JiCi Lauzon (actor), Pierre Céré, (2015 leadership candidate and 2014 MNA candidate in Laurier-Dorion)
Policies: Calls for a sovereignty referendum during her first term leading a PQ government, and has stated environmentalism and social-democracy are at the heart of her campaign.

=== Pierre Karl Péladeau ===
Background

MNA for Saint-Jérôme (2014–2016), principal shareholder and former president and CEO of Québecor Inc.

Date candidacy declared: November 27, 2014
Supporters
Support from caucus members: (15) Nicole Léger, Harold LeBel, Pascal Bérubé, Maka Kotto, Claude Cousineau, Dave Turcotte, Nicolas Marceau, Sylvain Rochon, Diane Lamarre, Bernard Drainville, Sylvain Gaudreault, Guy Leclair, Sylvain Roy, Alain Therrien, Mathieu Traversy
Support from former caucus members: (35) Bernard Landry (former Premier of Quebec),Jacques Baril, Yves Beaumier, Pierre Bélanger, Manon Blanchet, André Boulerice, Guy Chevrette, Yves Duhaime, Linda Goupil, Jean-Pierre Jolivet, Guy Julien, Marcel Landry, Scott McKay, Matthias Rioux, Étienne-Alexis Boucher, Diane Barbeau, René Blouin, Serge Cardin, Jean-Paul Champagne, Noëlla Champagne, Solange Charest, Jacques Côté, Daniel Doyer, Luc Ferland, Serge Geoffrion, Daniel Goyer, Jean-Marc Lacoste, Richard Le Hir, Léopold Marquis, Michel Morin, Claude Pinard, Jérôme Proulx, Luc Trudel, Daniel Turp
Other prominent supporters: Yves Michaud (former Liberal MNA 1966-1970), Yves Rocheleau (former MP), Ève-Mary Thaï Thi Lac (former MP), Pierre Paquette (former MP)
Policies: Has stated he's less interested in referendum dates and more on explaining the benefits of sovereignty. This has drawn criticism from other candidates, who claim he's too vague.

== Withdrawn candidates ==
=== Pierre Céré ===
Background

Spokesperson for the Conseil national des chômeurs, PQ activist and 2014 candidate in Laurier-Dorion.

Date candidacy declared: October 21, 2014
Date of withdrawal: May 10, 2015, endorsed Ouellet and Cloutier
Supporters
Support from caucus members:
Support from former caucus members:
Other prominent supporters: Yves Lessard (former MP), Claude Guimond (former MP), Claude Patry (MP)
Policies: Calls for a PQ government to negotiate a new partnership with Ottawa. If the negotiation fails, the government will call a new referendum on independence. Céré's platform is social-democratic, defending the welfare state and proposing a series of measures to reconnect the party with the people.

=== Bernard Drainville ===
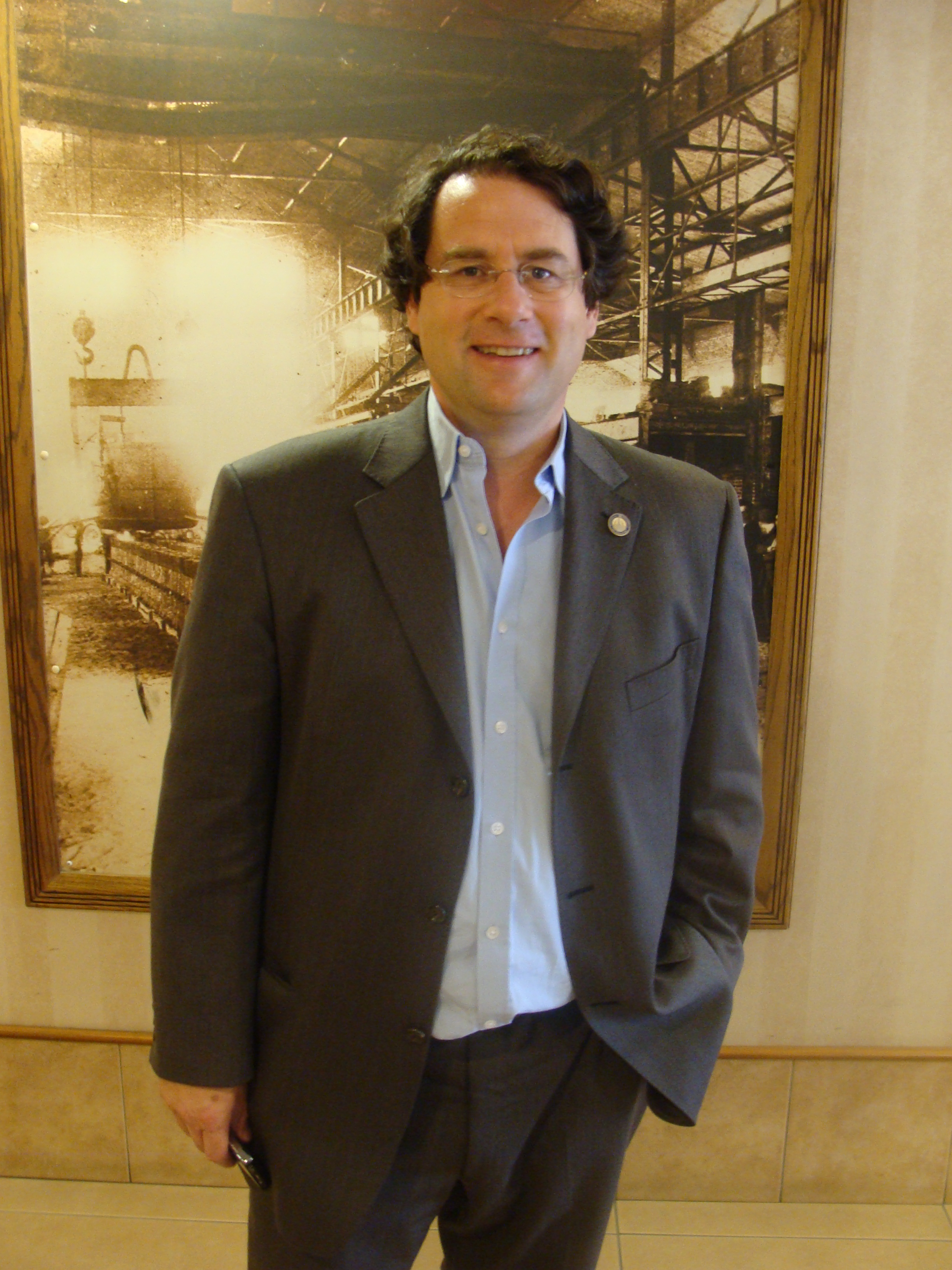
Bernard Drainville, MNA for Marie-Victorin

Background

MNA for Marie-Victorin (2007–2016), Minister responsible for Democratic Institutions and Active Citizenship (2012–2014) and the main architect and defender of the Quebec Charter of Values. former Radio-Canada journalist.

Date candidacy declared: October 20, 2014
Date of withdrawal: April 22, 2015, endorsed Péladeau
Supporters
Support from caucus members: (7) Alain Therrien, Guy Leclair, Sylvain Roy, Mathieu Traversy, Carole Poirier, Sylvain Gaudreault, André Villeneuve

Support from former caucus members: (1) Gilles Chapadeau
Other prominent supporters:
Policies: Has said he would not hold a sovereignty referendum in his first term as premier.

(He would later join Coalition Avenir Québec and run in the 2026 Coalition Avenir Québec leadership election)

=== Jean-François Lisée ===
Background

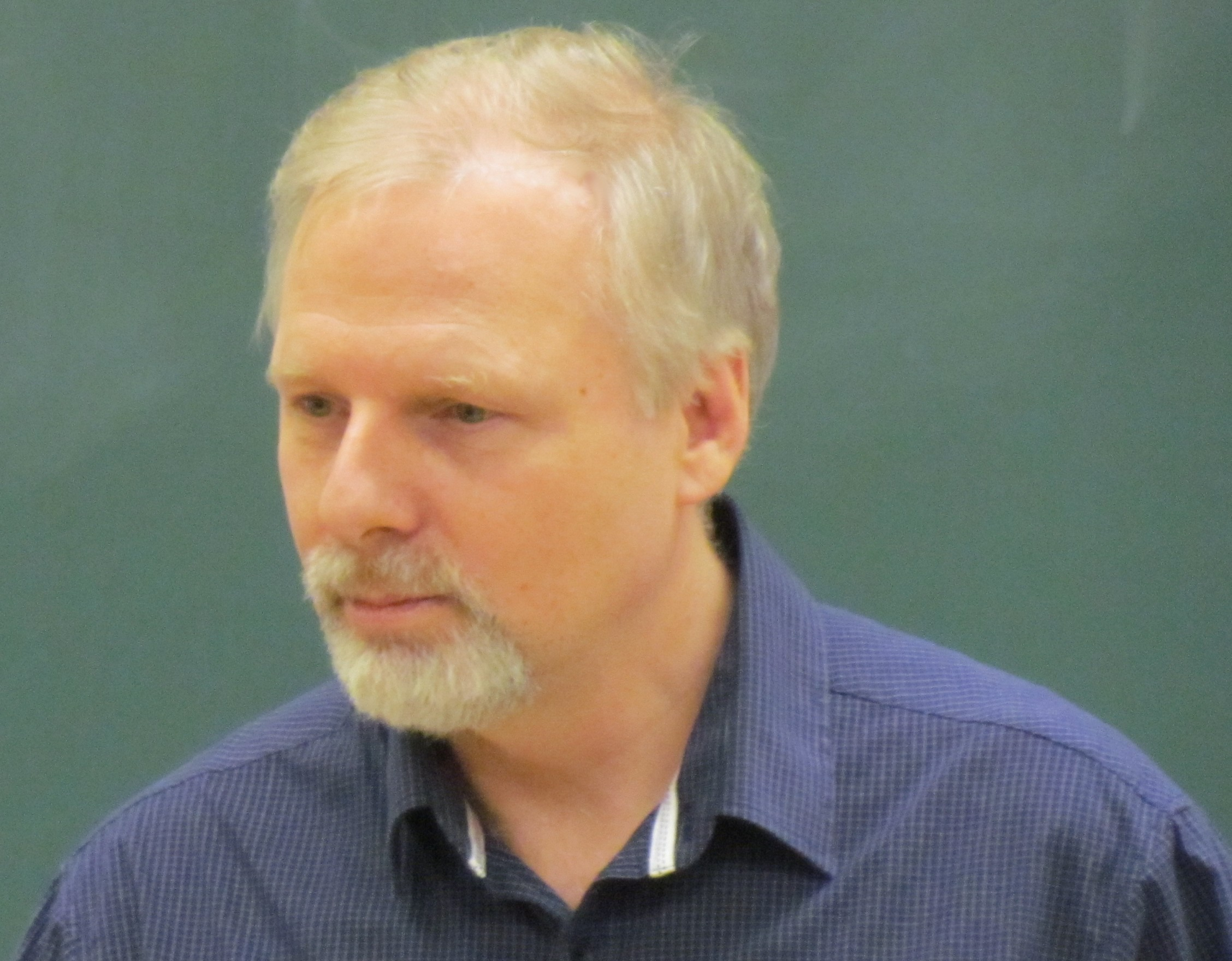
Jean-François Lisée, MNA for Rosemont

MNA for Rosemont (2012–2018), Minister of International Relations, La Francophonie and External Trade (2012–2014), former journalist and professor.

Date candidacy declared: October 31, 2014
Date of withdrawal: January 23, 2015
Supporters
Support from caucus members:
Support from former caucus members:
Other prominent supporters: Evelyne Abitbol (2014 candidate in Acadie)
Policies: In the wake of the PQ's election defeat he has been critical of the party's proposed Quebec Charter of Values. Has said he wants to reboot the PQ as inclusive and less focused on division, and open to anglophone and minority voters. (In 2016, Lisée would revive and supported elements of the original Quebec Charter of Values)

== Declined to run ==
- Jean-Martin Aussant, former MNA for Nicolet-Yamaska (2008–2012), Leader of Option nationale (2011–2013).
- Gilles Duceppe, former leader of the Bloc Québécois (1997–2011) and MP for Laurier—Sainte-Marie (1990–2011). Announced on May 13, 2014 that he will not be a candidate.
- Sylvain Gaudreault, MNA for Jonquière (2007–2022), Minister of Municipal Affairs and Transport (2012–2014).
- Réjean Hébert, former MNA for Saint-François (2012–2014), Minister of Health (2012–2014). Announced on September 3, 2014, that he is finished with politics and is resuming his career as a physician.
- Véronique Hivon, MNA for Joliette (2008–2022), Minister of Social services and Youth protection (2012 - 2014).
- Nicole Léger, MNA for Pointe-aux-Trembles (1996–2006, 2008–2018), Minister responsible for Family Services (1998–2001), Minister responsible for the War against Poverty (2001–2003), Minister of Families (2012–2014).
- Nicolas Marceau, MNA for Rousseau (2009–2018), Minister of Finance (2012–2014). Announced on 10 November that he will not be a candidate.

== Slogans ==
- Pierre Céré: Un Québec Juste, Un Québec Libre
- Alexandre Cloutier: Maintenant. Autrement.
- Bernard Drainville: Votre Voix
- Martine Ouellet: Oui, c'est vrai
- Pierre-Karl Péladeau: Réussir

== Results ==
- Pierre Karl Péladeau 57.58%
- Alexandre Cloutier 29.21%
- Martine Ouellet 13.21%
  - Eligible voters: 71,020
  - Turnout 79.9%

== Opinion polling ==
=== All Quebecers ===
Poll source	Date	1st	2nd	3rd	Other
Léger Marketing; Sample size: 1002	April 9, 2015	Pierre Karl Péladeau; 26%	Alexandre Cloutier; 20%	Bernard Drainville; 8%	Martine Ouellet 4%, Pierre Céré 1%, None 20%, Don't know/Prefer not to respond 22%
Léger Marketing; Sample size: 1036	February 5, 2015	Pierre Karl Péladeau; 34%	Bernard Drainville; 9%	Alexandre Cloutier; 8%	Martine Ouellet 7%, Pierre Céré 1%, None 23%, Don't know/Prefer not to respond 19%
Léger Marketing; Sample size: 989	December 11, 2014	Pierre Karl Péladeau; 36%	Alexandre Cloutier; 8%	Bernard Drainville; 6%	Jean-François Lisée 4%, Martine Ouellet 4%, Pierre Céré 0%, None 20%, Don't know/Prefer not to respond 28%
Léger Marketing; Sample size: 981	November 13, 2014	Pierre Karl Péladeau; 31%	Alexandre Cloutier; 8%	Jean-François Lisée; 7%	Bernard Drainville 6%, Martine Ouellet 2%, Pierre Céré 0%, None 18%, Don't know/Prefer not to respond 28%
Léger Marketing; Sample size: 1,000	September 25, 2014	Pierre Karl Péladeau; 27%	Jean-Martin Aussant; 7%	Bernard Drainville; 4%	Alexandre Cloutier 3%, Jean-François Lisée 3%, Martine Ouellet 3%, Nicolas Marceau 2%, Pascal Bérubé 1%, Other 2%, None 17%, Don't know 29%
Léger Marketing; Sample size: 1,009	June 5, 2014	Pierre Karl Péladeau; 19%	Véronique Hivon; 9%	Bernard Drainville; 7%	Jean-François Lisée 6%, Sylvain Gaudreault 4%, Pascal Bérubé 1%, Alexandre Cloutier 1%, Martine Ouellet 1%, None 24%, Don't know 26%, Prefer not to respond 2%
Léger Marketing; Sample size: 1,050	May 8, 2014	Gilles Duceppe; 21%	Pierre Karl Péladeau; 13%	Véronique Hivon; 7%	Bernard Drainville 4%, Sylvain Gaudreault 4%, Jean-François Lisée 4%, Alexandre Cloutier 2%, Réjean Hébert 2%, Other 2%, None 17%, Don't know 22%, Prefer not to respond 3%

=== Parti Québécois supporters only ===
Poll source	Date	1st	2nd	3rd	Other
Léger Marketing; Sample size: 216	April 9, 2015	Pierre Karl Péladeau; 59%	Alexandre Cloutier; 13%	Bernard Drainville; 9%	Martine Ouellet 4%, Pierre Céré 1%, None 1%, Don't know/Prefer not to respond 13%
Léger Marketing; Sample size: 218	February 5, 2015	Pierre Karl Péladeau; 63%	Martine Ouellet; 10%	Alexandre Cloutier; 9%	Bernard Drainville 7%, Pierre Céré 1%, None 2%, Don't know/Prefer not to respond 7%
Léger Marketing; Sample size: 203	December 11, 2014	Pierre Karl Péladeau; 68%	Alexandre Cloutier; 11%	Bernard Drainville; 9%	Martine Ouellet 3%, Jean-François Lisée 2%, Pierre Céré 1%, None 1%, Don't know/Prefer not to respond 6%
Léger Marketing; Sample size: 193	November 13, 2014	Pierre Karl Péladeau; 59%	Alexandre Cloutier; 12%	Bernard Drainville; 8%	Jean-François Lisée 4%, Martine Ouellet 1% Pierre Céré 0%, None 4%, Don't know/Prefer not to respond 13%
Léger Marketing; Sample size: 184	September 25, 2014	Pierre Karl Péladeau; 53%	Jean-Martin Aussant; 7%	Bernard Drainville; 7%	Alexandre Cloutier 5%, Martine Ouellet 5%, Jean-François Lisée 2%, Nicolas Marceau 1%, Pascal Bérubé 0%, Other 4%, None 2%, Don't know 14%
Léger Marketing; Sample size: 166	June 5, 2014	Pierre Karl Péladeau; 40%	Véronique Hivon; 12%	Jean-François Lisée; 9%	Bernard Drainville 8%, Sylvain Gaudreault 7%, Alexandre Cloutier 2%, Pascal Bérubé 0%, Martine Ouellet 0%, None 4%, Don't know 18%, Prefer not to respond 0%
Léger Marketing; Sample size: 154	May 8, 2014	Gilles Duceppe; 26%	Pierre Karl Péladeau; 21%	Sylvain Gaudreault; 10%	Bernard Drainville 9%, Jean-François Lisée 9%, Véronique Hivon 6%, Réjean Hébert 2%, Alexandre Cloutier 0%, Other 2%, None 2%, Don't know 14%, Prefer not to respond 1%

== See also ==
- Parti Québécois leadership elections
- 1985 Parti Québécois leadership election
- 2005 Parti Québécois leadership election
- 2007 Parti Québécois leadership election
