= Pierre Céré =

Canadian politician and writer

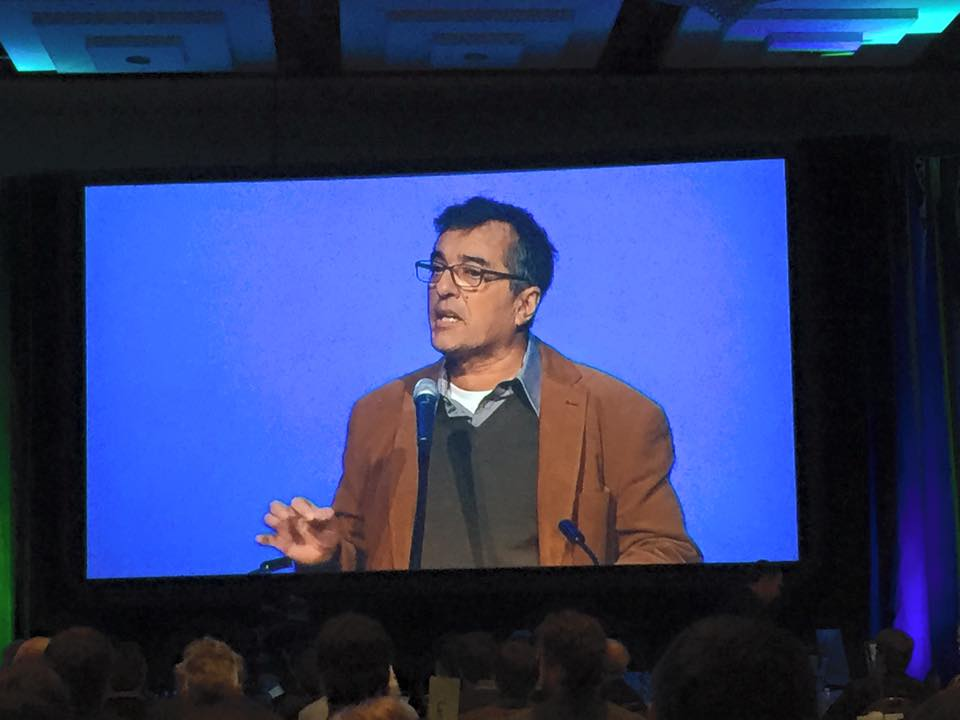
- Céré in 2015

Spokesperson for the National Council of Unemployed Workers
- In office 2005–2024

Coordinator of the Comité Chômage de Montréal
- In office 1997–2024

Personal details
- Born: April 9, 1959 (age 67) Rouyn-Noranda, Quebec
- Party: New Democratic (since 2026)
- Other political affiliations: Parti Québécois (2014–2016)

Pierre Céré (born April 9, 1959) is a Quebec activist, writer and politician. He was spokesperson for the National Council of the Unemployed, and became known to the public for being a candidate in the 2015 Parti Québécois leadership election, won by Pierre Karl Péladeau.

He is currently the NDP candidate in the 2026 Rosemont—La Petite-Patrie federal by-election, to replace Alexandre Boulerice.

== Biography ==
Céré was born on April 9, 1959, in Rouyn. He has been active for some thirty years in community organizations and in international solidarity. From 1975 to 1977, he was involved in the group En lutte!. He left his native Abitibi in 1982 for Montreal, to take over the leadership of the Regroupement des chômeurs et chômeuses du Québec (Quebec Unemployed Workers' Association), before joining the Regroupement autonome des jeunes (RAJ) (Autonomous Youth Group) and then heading to Latin America in the late 1980s. He also pursued studies in history. Coordinator of the Montreal Unemployment Committee between 1986 and 1989 and continuously since 1997, he became spokesperson for the National Council of Unemployed Workers in 2005. He then gained prominence through the campaigns of the Coalition of the Shirtless, uniting union and worker advocacy groups around improvements to the employment insurance system. He ran as a candidate for the Parti Québécois candidate in the Montreal riding of Laurier-Dorion in the 2014 Quebec general election. He is the author of several books, the first of which, Une gauche possible (A Possible Left), was published in 2010. He has also translated several books by Marta Harnecker, including La Gauche à l'aube du XXIe siècle.

During the 2018 Quebec general election, Pierre Céré gives his support to the Quebec solidaire candidate in Laurier-Dorion, Andrés Fontecilla.

In June 2026, he declared his intention to succeed Alexandre Boulerice and become the New Democratic Party candidate in Rosemont-La-Petite-Patrie in the upcoming by-election. He campaigned in the riding with NDP leader Avi Lewis.

== 2014 Parti québécois leadership election ==
In September 2014, he questioned the procedures of the Parti Québécois leadership election and stated that he was considering running himself. He spoke on the subject at the beginning of October. Following the National Conference of Presidents and Chairpersons (CNPP) of the Parti Québécois held in Sherbrooke: "We are starting completely from elsewhere, from civil society, no political personnel, no personal fortune". In fact, Pierre Céré never hesitated to express his critical and sharp point of view, even towards his peers, without breaking off dialogue and debate: he did not hesitate to demand that Pierre Karl Péladeau make a choice between his role as a Member of the National Assembly and that of being the owner of a media empire. On October 21, he officially launched his campaign and published a platform entitled Un Québec juste, un Québec libre. Citing René Lévesque, Marcel Pepin et Salvador Allende, as influences , he spoke on behalf of the party's social-democratic wing, while trying to find a way to build a new social majority around the sovereignty project. Presenting himself as the "fifth candidate," whom no one expected, he received the support of union leaders and former Bloc Québécois Members of Parliament (MPs) Claude Guimond and Yves Lessard as well as Claude Patry, in the House of Commons. Patry explained, "I'm a guy who comes from the grassroots. I worked in a factory. I've always dealt with guys who have unemployment problems. We have things in common". Political columnist Gilbert Lavoie goes so far as to say that "In the opinion of several observers, Pierre Céré was the discovery of the Parti Québécois leadership race". Three days before the end of the campaign, after having participated in all the debates, but unable to raise the second $20,000 required to officially register his candidacy, Pierre Céré withdrew from the race and called on his supporters to vote for Martine Ouellet or Alexandre Cloutier.

A year after withdrawing from the race, Céré published Coup de barre with Éditions Somme toute. "The starting point for this book is the 2015 Parti Québécois leadership race in which the author participated. This book raises the question of the refounding of the Parti Québécois, faced with this dilemma: transform or collapse. It is a questioning of a political world dominated by establishments in need of continuity. It is also a societal project based on the development of the Quebec model and Quebec sovereignty".

== Electoral record ==
Canadian federal by-election, December 7, 2026: Rosemont—La Petite-Patrie Resignation of Alexandre Boulerice (August 25, 2026)
The by-election will be held on December 7, 2026.
Party	Candidate	Votes	%	±%
New Democratic	Pierre Céré			
Liberal	Jean-Sébastien Vallée			
Bloc Québécois	Alexandre Curzi			
Conservative	TBD			
Green	TBD			
Total valid votes				
Total rejected ballots				
Turnout				
Eligible voters				
Note: The New Democratic Party won the seat in the 2025 general election, but Boulerice resigned from the caucus and sat as an independent MP on April 27, 2026.
Source: Elections Canada

== Published works ==
- Petit Guide de survie des chômeurs et chômeuses, Comité chômage de Montréal (since 1991)
- La Gauche à l'aube du XXIe siècle: Rendre possible l'impossible, Marta Harnecker, Lanctôt translated from the Spanish by Pierre Céré, 2001
- MST-Brésil: La construction d'un mouvement social, Interview with Joao Pedro Stédile, Postface de Marta Harnecker; translated from Spanish by Pierre Céré, 2003
- Une Gauche possible: Changement social et espace démocratique, Montréal, Éditions Liber, 2010
- Un Québec juste, un Québec libre: Programme de Pierre Céré à la chefferie du Parti québécois, 2014
- Coup de barre, Montréal, Éditions Somme toute, 2016
- Les Pots cassés: Une histoire de l'assurance-chômage, Montréal, Éditions Somme Toute, 2020
- La Crise et le filet social: Pourquoi la droite n'aime pas la PCU, Montréal, Éditions Somme Toute, 2021
- Voyage au bout de la mine: Le scandale de la Fonderie Horne, Montréal, Écosociété, 2023 (Preface by Alain Deneault)
- La Tête de l'emploi: Brèves histoires de chômage, Montréal, Écosociété, 2025
