= Martine Ouellet =

Canadian politician (born 1969)

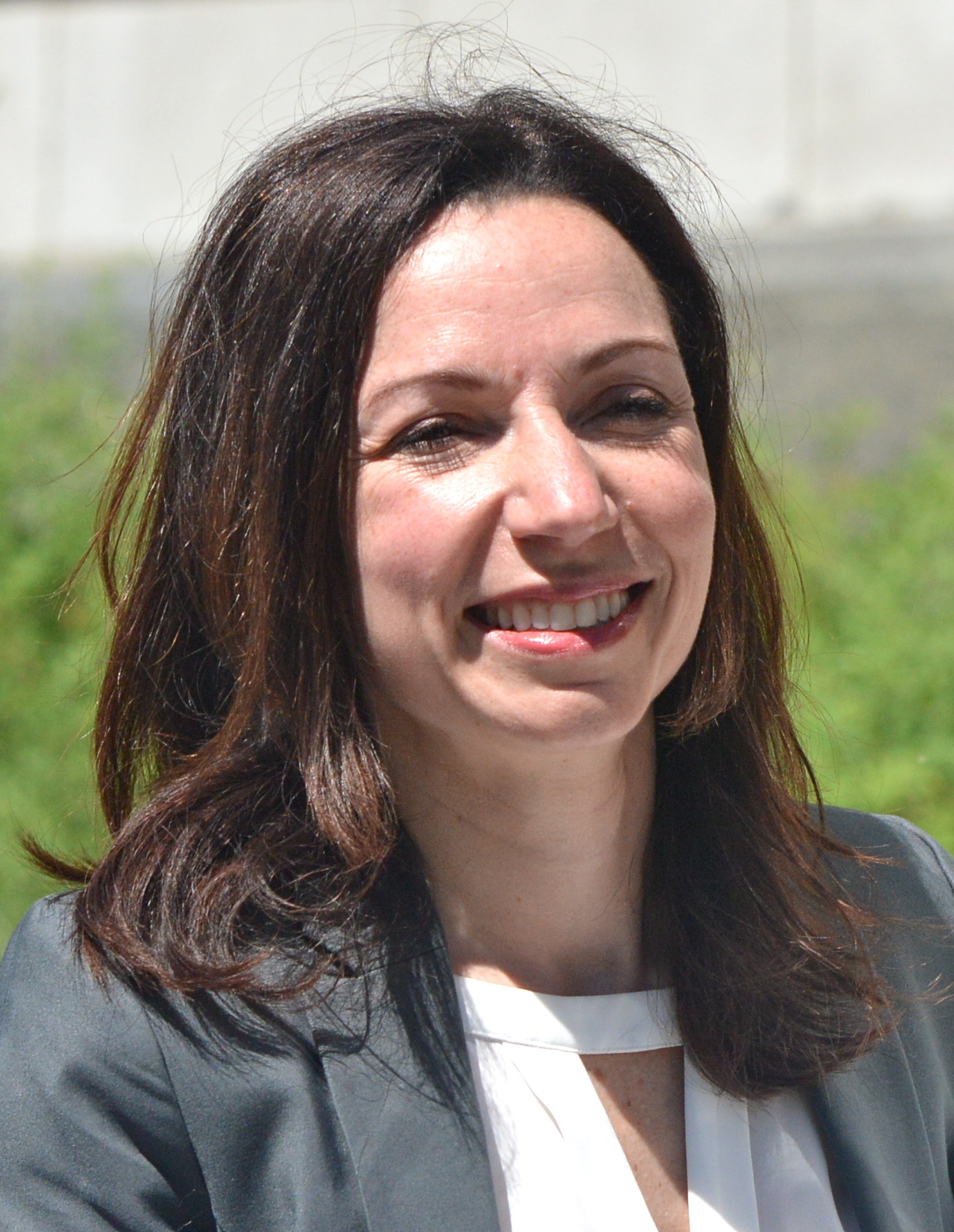
- Ouellet in 2016

Leader of Climat Québec
- Incumbent
- Assumed office May 14, 2021
- Preceded by: Position established

Leader of the Bloc Québécois
- In office March 14, 2017 – June 11, 2018
- President: Mario Beaulieu
- Preceded by: Rhéal Fortin (interim)
- Succeeded by: Mario Beaulieu (interim)

Member of the National Assembly of Quebec for Vachon
- In office July 5, 2010 – October 1, 2018
- Preceded by: Camil Bouchard
- Succeeded by: Ian Lafrenière

Personal details
- Born: April 8, 1969 (age 57) Longueuil, Quebec, Canada
- Party: Bloc Québécois (federal); Climat Québec (since 2021, provincial)
- Other political affiliations: Parti Québécois (2010–2017, provincial); Independent (2017–2021, provincial)
- Education: HEC Montreal; McGill University
- Profession: Politician; engineer

Martine Ouellet (French pronunciation: [maʁtin wɛlɛt]; born April 8, 1969) is a Canadian politician who served as leader of the Bloc Québécois from 2017 to 2018. She was the Minister of Natural Resources in the Quebec government from 2012 to 2014.

Ouellet was first elected to the National Assembly of Quebec in a by-election on July 5, 2010, representing the electoral district of Vachon, standing as a candidate for Parti Québécois.

On May 14, 2021, Ouellet announced her return to politics by creating a new provincial party, named Climat Québec.

== Early life and education ==
Ouellet is from the South Shore. She graduated with a degree in mechanical engineering from McGill University in 1992 and received an M.B.A from the HEC Montreal. Prior to her first election, Ouellet worked as an engineer for Hydro-Québec.

== Political career ==
=== Provincial ===
Ouellet was elected to the National Assembly of Quebec in a by-election on July 5, 2010, representing the electoral district of Vachon, standing as a candidate for Parti Québécois.

After the Parti Québécois won the 2012 election, she was appointed as Minister of Natural Resources in the Marois government. She held the position until the government's defeat in the 2014 election.

Ouellet contested the leadership of the Parti Québécois in 2015 and in 2016, placing third both times. Both times she campaigned on PQ holding a referendum on Quebec sovereignty in a first mandate, losing to a candidate who opposed holding a referendum on Quebec sovereignty in a first mandate.

=== Federal ===
On February 5, 2017, Ouellet announced her candidacy in the 2017 Bloc Québécois leadership election. At the same time, she resigned from the Parti Québécois and sat in the National Assembly of Quebec as an independent. She stated that she will not seek to enter the federal House of Commons via a by-election, saying that she wants to "have a foot" in both Quebec City and Ottawa. After being the only candidate in the race at the end of the nomination period, she was officially acclaimed as leader on March 18, 2017.

In June 2017, she faced a caucus revolt after her chief of staff, Louis-Philippe Dubois, leaked information to the media in an effort to discredit former interim leader Rhéal Fortin. Members of caucus suspected he had leaked the information on Ouellet's instructions. Ouellet resolved the conflict by firing Dubois and apologising to Fortin.

On February 26, 2018, Gabriel Ste-Marie resigned as the Bloc's House Leader due to conflicts with Ouellet. In a tumultuous caucus meeting, seven of the Bloc's 10 MPs voiced their opposition to Ouellet's leadership, accusing her of having an authoritarian style and boycotted Question Period in order to express their dissent.

The previous week, Ouellet had given a speech to the Bloc's general council in which she complained that she had felt resistance to her leadership from caucus since becoming leader in 2017 and also argued that the Bloc needs to emphasize Quebec independence rather than soft-pedal it.

Fortin criticised her speech saying: "A leader who opens a general council by posing as a victim, then saying that she is a victim of leaks and resistance. For me, it’s not a speech worthy of a leader."

The party's general council also approved paying Ouellet a salary of $95,000 as, without a seat in the House of Commons, she was not eligible for a parliamentary leader's salary. It also approved a supplementary payment, which would have resulted in a total salary of $200,000 once her term as a member of the Quebec National Assembly ended with the 2018 provincial election.

Opposition to Ouellet came to a breaking point on February 28, 2018 when seven MPs quit the caucus to sit as independents, citing Ouellet's alleged authoritarianism as their reason for leaving. The defections left the Bloc with a caucus of three MPs. More than 20 ex-Bloc MPs, including former leader Gilles Duceppe, issued an open letter supporting the seven current MPs who had resigned from caucus and demanding Ouellet's resignation. Nevertheless, after a lengthy meeting, the party's executive issued a statement supporting Ouellet's leadership but also stating that the seven rebels could keep their Bloc Québécois memberships and would not be expelled from the party for quitting the caucus, inviting them to return to the caucus in the future. However, on May 1, the seven MPs announced that they were severing all ties with the BQ and considering founding a new political party: Québec debout.

On June 3, 2018, Ouellet was defeated in a leadership review, with 32% of members voting in favour of her continued leadership and 67% opposed. In a media conference held the day after the results were announced, Ouellet blamed party president and MP Mario Beaulieu, Gilles Duceppe, and the party's old guard for her defeat, accusing them of campaigning against her, and announced that she was resigning as party leader effective June 11, 2018. By September 17, 2018, all seven members of Québec debout had rejoined the Bloc Québécois caucus.

=== Return to provincial politics ===
On May 14, 2021, Ouellet announced her return to politics by creating a new provincial party: Climat Québec. She was a candidate in the 2023 Jean-Talon provincial by-election but she came in sixth place with only 1% of the vote.

== Electoral record ==
Quebec provincial by-election, October 2, 2023 On the resignation of Joëlle Boutin
Party	Candidate	Votes	%	±%
Parti Québécois	Pascal Paradis	11,307	44.06	+25.37
Coalition Avenir Québec	Marie-Anik Shoiry	5,474	21.33	–11.18
Québec solidaire	Olivier Bolduc	4,491	17.50	–6.26
Liberal	Élise Avard Bernier	2,270	8.85	–4.67
Conservative	Jesse Robitaille	1,558	6.07	–4.29
Climat Québec	Martine Ouellet	308	1.20	+0.93
Green	Kadidia Mahamane Bamba	152	0.59	–0.17
Démocratie directe	Lucie Perreault	41	0.16	
Independent	Jean Duval	35	0.14	
Équipe Autonomiste	Steve Therion	28	0.11	–0.02
Total valid votes		25,664	99.02	–
Total rejected ballots		253	0.98	0.00
Turnout		25,917	55.21	–18.64
Electors on the lists		46,941	–	–
Parti Québécois gain from Coalition Avenir Québec		Swing		+18.27

2022 Quebec general election: Marie-Victorin
Party	Candidate	Votes	%	±%
Coalition Avenir Québec	Shirley Dorismond	9,212	33.11	-1.84
Parti Québécois	Pierre Nantel	6,913	24.85	-5.22
Québec solidaire	Shophika Vaithyanathasarma	6,307	22.67	+8.46
Liberal	Lyes Chekal	2,793	10.04	+3.11
Conservative	Lara Stillo	1,952	7.02	-3.38
Green	Vincent Aquin-Belleau	308	1.11	+0.24
Climat Québec	Martine Ouellet	260	0.93	-0.97
Marxist–Leninist	Pierre Chénier	48	0.17	–
Équipe Autonomiste	Florent Portron	27	0.10	+0.03
Total valid votes		27,820	98.52	–
Total rejected ballots		418	1.48	–
Turnout		28,238	61.64	+25.51
Electors on the lists		48,810	–	–

Quebec provincial by-election, April 11, 2022: Marie-Victorin Resignation of Catherine Fournier
Party	Candidate	Votes	%	±%
Coalition Avenir Québec	Shirley Dorismond	5,697	34.95	+6.56
Parti Québécois	Pierre Nantel	4,902	30.07	-0.74
Québec solidaire	Shophika Vaithyanathasarma	2,316	14.21	-7.46
Conservative	Anne Casabonne	1,696	10.40	–
Liberal	Émilie Nollet	1,130	6.93	-8.28
Climat Québec	Martine Ouellet	310	1.90	–
Green	Alex Tyrrell	142	0.87	-1.28
Accès propriété et équité	Shawn Lalande McLean	42	0.26	–
Indépendance du Québec	Michel Blondin	21	0.13	–
Union Nationale	Michel Lebrun	17	0.10	–
Independent	Philippe Tessier	17	0.10	–
Équipe Autonomiste	Florent Portron	11	0.07	-0.09
Total valid votes		16,301	98.86	+0.70
Total rejected ballots		188	1.14	-0.70
Turnout		16,489	36.13	-26.78
Electors on the lists		45,636	–	
Source: Élections Québec
Coalition Avenir Québec gain from Parti Québécois		Swing		+3.65

2014 Quebec general election
Party	Candidate	Votes	%	±%
Parti Québécois	Martine Ouellet	11,983	33.06	-6.53
Liberal	Michel Bienvenu	11,809	32.58	+11.37
Coalition Avenir Québec	Stephane Robichaud	9,164	25.28	-4.38
Québec solidaire	Sebastien Robert	2,644	7.29	+2.24

2012 Quebec general election
Party	Candidate	Votes	%	±%
Parti Québécois	Martine Ouellet	14,723	39.59	
Coalition Avenir Québec	Jean-François Roberge	11,030	29.66	
Liberal	Linda Langlois Saulnier	7,885	21.21	
Québec solidaire	Sebastien Robert	1,878	5.05	

Quebec provincial by-election, July 5, 2010: Vachon
Party	Candidate	Votes	%	±%
Parti Québécois	Martine Ouellet	7,863	59.15	+10.51
Liberal	Simon-Pierre Diamond	3,236	24.34	−7.94
Action démocratique	Alain Dépatie	879	6.61	−7.06
Québec solidaire	Sébastien Robert	727	5.47	+3.23
Green	Yvon Rudolphe	419	3.15	−0.01
Independent	Denis Durand	98	0.74	−2.42
Independent	Régent Millette	71	0.53	-
Total valid votes		13,293	100.00	
Rejected and declined votes		174		
Turnout		13,467	29.25	−32.23
Electors on the lists		46,046		

Source: Official Results, Le Directeur général des élections du Québec.
