= 2026 Rosemont—La Petite-Patrie federal by-election =

Pending Canadian federal by-election

- December 7, 2026

Riding of Rosemont—La Petite-Patrie
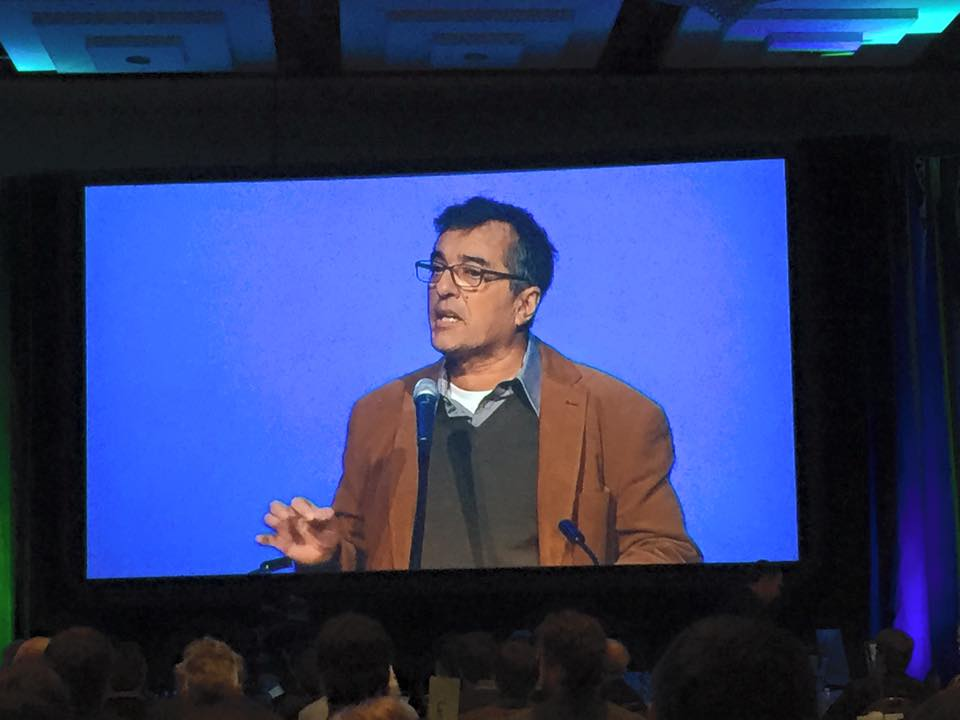
		LPC
Candidate	Pierre Céré	Jean-Sébastien Vallée
Party	New Democratic	Liberal
Last election	40.99%	31.57%
	BQ	CPC
Candidate	Alexandre Curzi	Osmar Llanos Martinez
Party	Bloc Québécois	Conservative
Last election	18.28%	6.85%
Incumbent MP
Vacant (Note: The seat was held by Alexandre Boulerice (independent) until his resignation on August 26, 2026. Boulerice was elected as a member of the New Democratic Party in the 2025 federal election, but left the caucus on April 27, 2026, to sit as an independent MP.)

A by-election will be held on December 7, 2026, to elect a member of Parliament (MP) to represent Rosemont—La Petite-Patrie, Quebec, in the House of Commons for the remainder of the 45th Parliament, following the resignation of independent MP Alexandre Boulerice.

== Background ==
Boulerice was first elected to the House of Commons in the 2011 Canadian federal election, when the New Democratic Party made major gains in Quebec. He was subsequently re-elected in 2015, 2019, 2021 and 2025. By 2026, Boulerice was the last remaining Quebec MP elected as part of the NDP's 2011 Orange Wave.

In the 2025 Canadian federal election, Boulerice was re-elected with 24,358 votes, or 40.99% of the vote. Liberal candidate Jean-Sébastien Vallée finished second with 31.57%, followed by Bloc Québécois candidate Olivier Gignac with 18.28%, Conservative candidate Laetitia Tchatat with 6.85%, and Green candidate Benoît Morham with 2.30%.

On April 27, 2026, Boulerice announced that he would leave the NDP and seek election to the National Assembly of Quebec as a Québec solidaire candidate in Gouin in the 2026 Quebec general election. He subsequently left the NDP caucus and sat in the House of Commons as an independent.

Boulerice formally resigned his seat on August 25, 2026, ahead of the start of the Quebec provincial election campaign. He had represented Rosemont—La Petite-Patrie for five consecutive terms and had served in a number of senior NDP roles, including as deputy leader of the party.

== Constituency ==
Rosemont—La Petite-Patrie is an urban federal electoral district in Montreal, Quebec. The riding covers much of the Rosemont–La Petite-Patrie borough, including the neighbourhoods of Rosemont and Little Italy.

The riding had been represented by Boulerice since 2011. In the 2025 federal election, the NDP retained the seat with 40.99% of the vote, while the Liberals increased their share to 31.57%. The Bloc Québécois finished third with 18.28%.

== Timing ==
On August 27, 2026, Elections Canada announced that Chief Electoral Officer Stéphane Perrault had received official notice from the speaker of the House of Commons on August 26 that the seat was vacant.

Under the Parliament of Canada Act, the date of the by-election had to be announced by February 22, 2027. Once the by-election is called, election day must be a Monday at least 36 days and no more than 50 days after the issue of the writ. Elections Canada stated that the latest possible date for the by-election was April 12, 2027. On November 1, 2026, the election was called to be held on December 7.

== Candidates ==
The Bloc Québécois announced Alexandre Curzi as its prospective candidate on June 18, 2026. Curzi is the executive director of the Union des artistes and previously served as president of the Alliance québécoise des techniciens et techniciennes de l'image et du son. He is the son of actor and former Parti Québécois MNA Pierre Curzi.

The New Democratic Party selected Pierre Céré as its candidate on July 16, 2026. Céré is a longtime advocate for unemployed workers and former spokesperson for the Conseil national des chômeurs. He had previously sought the leadership of the Parti Québécois in the 2015 Parti Québécois leadership election. NDP leader Avi Lewis subsequently campaigned in the riding with Céré.

On October 22, 2026, the Liberals announced that Jean-Sébastien Vallée, a human rights activist who had been the 2025 candidate for the party in the riding, would be the candidate once again.

On November 4, 2026, the Conservatives announced Osmar Llanos Martinez as the candidate. He was a candidate for the Conservative Party of Quebec in the 2026 Quebec general election in Pontiac.

== Result ==
Canadian federal by-election, December 7, 2026: Rosemont—La Petite-Patrie Resignation of Alexandre Boulerice (August 25, 2026)
The by-election will be held on December 7, 2026.
Party	Candidate	Votes	%	±%
New Democratic	Pierre Céré			
Liberal	Jean-Sébastien Vallée			
Bloc Québécois	Alexandre Curzi			
Conservative	Osmar Llanos Martinez			
Green	TBD			
People's	Ernesto Almeida			
Total valid votes				
Total rejected ballots				
Turnout				
Eligible voters				
Note: The New Democratic Party won the seat in the 2025 general election, but Boulerice resigned from the caucus and sat as an independent MP on April 27, 2026.
Source: Elections Canada

== Previous result ==
2025 Canadian federal election: Rosemont—La Petite-Patrie
Party	Candidate	Votes	%	±%	Expenditures
New Democratic	Alexandre Boulerice	24,358	40.99	−7.58	$92,456.20
Liberal	Jean-Sébastien Vallée	18,757	31.57	+8.40	$24,721.13
Bloc Québécois	Olivier Gignac	10,864	18.28	−3.09	$22,137.00
Conservative	Laetitia Tchatat	4,073	6.85	+2.86	$2,806.26
Green	Benoît Morham	1,368	2.30	−0.08	$0.00
Total valid votes		59,420	98.75	+0.64	$129,252.39
Total rejected ballots		755	1.25	–0.64	
Turnout		60,175	72.30	+4.54	
Eligible voters		83,229			
New Democratic hold		Swing		−7.99	
Source: Elections Canada

== See also ==
- By-elections to the 45th Canadian Parliament
- Rosemont—La Petite-Patrie
