= Marie-Victorin (electoral district) =

Provincial electoral district in Quebec, Canada

Coordinates: 45.520°N 73.486°W

Quebec electoral district
- Location in Longueuil

Provincial electoral district
- Legislature: National Assembly of Quebec
MNA
Nicolas Marceau
Parti Québécois
- District created: 1980
- First contested: 1981
- Last contested: 2026

Demographics
- Population (2016): 63,575
- Electors (2022): 45,636
- Area (km²): 14.46
- Pop. density (per km²): 4,396.6
- Census division: Longueuil (part)
- Census subdivision: Longueuil (part)

Marie-Victorin (French pronunciation: [maʁi viktɔʁɛ̃]) is a provincial electoral district in Quebec, Canada, that elects members to the National Assembly of Quebec. The district is located in the Vieux-Longueuil Borough of Longueuil. It is bordered to the north by chemin de Chambly, to the east by the city limits, to the south by the Canadian National railway, Boulevard Desaulniers and the city limits, and to the west by the Saint Lawrence River.

It was created for the 1981 election from parts of Laporte and Taillon electoral districts.

In the change from the 2001 to the 2011 electoral map, it gained some territory from Taillon.

It was named after Brother Marie-Victorin, a Quebec botanist.

== Members of the National Assembly ==
Legislature	Years	Member	Party
Riding created from Laporte and Taillon
32nd	1981–1983	Pierre Marois	Parti Québécois
32nd	1984–1985	Guy Pratt	Liberal
33rd	1985–1989	Cécile Vermette	Parti Québécois
34th	1989–1994	Cécile Vermette	Parti Québécois
35th	1994–1998	Cécile Vermette	Parti Québécois
36th	1998–2003	Cécile Vermette	Parti Québécois
37th	2003–2007	Cécile Vermette	Parti Québécois
38th	2007–2008	Bernard Drainville	Parti Québécois
39th	2008–2012	Bernard Drainville	Parti Québécois
40th	2012–2014	Bernard Drainville	Parti Québécois
41st	2014–2016	Bernard Drainville	Parti Québécois
41st	2016–2018	Catherine Fournier	Parti Québécois
42nd	2018–2019	Catherine Fournier	Parti Québécois
42nd	2019–2021	Catherine Fournier	Independent
42nd	2022–2022	Shirley Dorismond	Coalition Avenir Québec
43rd	2022–2026	Shirley Dorismond	Coalition Avenir Québec
44th	2026–Present	Nicolas Marceau	Parti Québécois

== Election results ==
2026 Quebec general election
** Preliminary results — Not yet official **
Party	Candidate	Votes	%	±%
Parti Québécois	Nicolas Marceau	9,205	33.34	
Québec solidaire	Lauréline Manassero	5,782	20.94	
Liberal	Lyes Chekal	5,600	20.29	
Coalition Avenir Québec	Shirley Dorismond	3,722	13.48	
Conservative	Amélie Legeay	2,832	10.26	
Green	Michel Fortin	378	1.37	
Parti accès propriété et équité	Gabriel Landry	87	0.32	
Total valid votes				
Total rejected ballots				
Turnout			63.01	
Electors on the lists			–	–
Source: Élections Québec

2022 Quebec general election
Party	Candidate	Votes	%	±%
Coalition Avenir Québec	Shirley Dorismond	9,212	33.11	-1.84
Parti Québécois	Pierre Nantel	6,913	24.85	-5.22
Québec solidaire	Shophika Vaithyanathasarma	6,307	22.67	+8.46
Liberal	Lyes Chekal	2,793	10.04	+3.11
Conservative	Lara Stillo	1,952	7.02	-3.38
Green	Vincent Aquin-Belleau	308	1.11	+0.24
Climat Québec	Martine Ouellet	260	0.93	-0.97
Marxist–Leninist	Pierre Chénier	48	0.17	–
Équipe Autonomiste	Florent Portron	27	0.10	+0.03
Total valid votes		27,820	98.52	–
Total rejected ballots		418	1.48	–
Turnout		28,238	61.64	+25.51
Electors on the lists		48,810	–	–

Quebec provincial by-election, April 11, 2022 Resignation of Catherine Fournier
Party	Candidate	Votes	%	±%
Coalition Avenir Québec	Shirley Dorismond	5,697	34.95	+6.56
Parti Québécois	Pierre Nantel	4,902	30.07	-0.74
Québec solidaire	Shophika Vaithyanathasarma	2,316	14.21	-7.46
Conservative	Anne Casabonne	1,696	10.40	–
Liberal	Émilie Nollet	1,130	6.93	-8.28
Climat Québec	Martine Ouellet	310	1.90	–
Green	Alex Tyrrell	142	0.87	-1.28
Accès propriété et équité	Shawn Lalande McLean	42	0.26	–
Indépendance du Québec	Michel Blondin	21	0.13	–
Union Nationale	Michel Lebrun	17	0.10	–
Independent	Philippe Tessier	17	0.10	–
Équipe Autonomiste	Florent Portron	11	0.07	-0.09
Total valid votes		16,301	98.86	+0.70
Total rejected ballots		188	1.14	-0.70
Turnout		16,489	36.13	-26.78
Electors on the lists		45,636	–	
Source: Élections Québec
Coalition Avenir Québec gain from Parti Québécois		Swing		+3.65

2018 Quebec general election
Party	Candidate	Votes	%	±%
Parti Québécois	Catherine Fournier	8,952	30.82	-21.68
Coalition Avenir Québec	Martyne Prévost	8,247	28.39	+14.24
Québec solidaire	Carl Lévesque	6,295	21.67	+7.48
Liberal	Sonia Ziadé	4,418	15.21	+1.77
Green	Laeticia Poiré-Hill	625	2.15	-0.47
New Democratic	Myriam de Grandpré-Ruel	310	1.07	
CINQ	Shirley Cedent	98	0.34	+0.09
Marxist–Leninist	Pierre Chénier	60	0.21	
Équipe Autonomiste	Florent Portron	45	0.15	-0.03
Total valid votes		29,050	98.16	
Total rejected ballots		546	1.84	+0.64
Turnout		29,596	62.91	+37.20
Eligible voters		47,044		
Parti Québécois hold		Swing		-17.96
Source(s) "Rapport des résultats officiels du scrutin". Élections Québec.

Quebec provincial by-election, 2016
Party	Candidate	Votes	%	±%
Parti Québécois	Catherine Fournier	6,302	52.49	+14.33
Québec solidaire	Carl Lévesque	1,703	14.19	+2.62
Coalition Avenir Québec	Julie Chapdelaine	1,699	14.15	-6.45
Liberal	Normand Parisien	1,613	13.44	-12.61
Green	Vincent J. Carbonneau	315	2.62	+0.30
Option nationale	Fabien Villemaire	109	0.91	+0.11
Parti travailliste du Québec	Roch Dumont	101	0.84	
Conservative	Hoang Nam Nguyen	90	0.75	
Changement intégrité pour notre Québec	Shirley Cedent	30	0.25	
Équipe Autonomiste	Florent Portron	22	0.18	+0.04
Parti indépendantiste	Étienne Turgeon Pelletier	21	0.17	
Total valid votes		12,005	98.79	
Total rejected ballots		147	1.21	-0.70
Turnout		12,152	25.71	-40.62
Electors on the lists		47,267		
Parti Québécois hold		Swing		+5.85

2014 Quebec general election
Party	Candidate	Votes	%	±%
Parti Québécois	Bernard Drainville	11,614	38.17	-8.94
Liberal	Jean-Guy Tremblay	7,926	26.05	+8.51
Coalition Avenir Québec	Guillaume Provencher	6,269	20.60	-1.02
Québec solidaire	Carl Lévesque	3,518	11.56	+3.35
Green	Catherine Lovatt-Smith	707	2.32	+0.35
Option nationale	Fabien Villemaire	244	0.80	-1.73
Marxist–Leninist	Pierre Chénier	107	0.35	–
Équipe Autonomiste	Florent Portron	44	0.14	
Total valid votes		30,429	98.09	
Total rejected ballots		591	1.91	+0.44
Turnout		31,020	66.32	-5.55
Electors on the lists		46,770	–	
Parti Québécois hold		Swing		-8.72

2012 Quebec general election
Party	Candidate	Votes	%	±%
Parti Québécois	Bernard Drainville	15,506	47.10	-4.00
Coalition Avenir Québec	Simon Jolin-Barrette	7,119	21.63	+10.30
Liberal	Farida Chemmakh	5,773	17.54	-11.77
Québec solidaire	Carl Lévesque	2,702	8.21	+3.83
Option nationale	Olivier Chauvin	832	2.53	
Green	Mathieu Yargeau	648	1.97	-1.09
Coalition pour la constituante	Jean Baillargeon	244	0.74	–
Parti indépendantiste	Yves Ménard	94	0.29	-0.54
Total valid votes		32,918	98.54	
Total rejected ballots		489	1.46	
Turnout		33,407	71.88	
Electors on the lists		46,478	–	
Parti Québécois hold		Swing		-7.15

^ Change is from redistributed results. CAQ change is from ADQ.

2008 Quebec general election redistributed results
Party	Vote	%
Parti Québécois	12,905	51.10
Liberal	7,401	29.31
Action démocratique	2,861	11.33
Québec solidaire	1,105	4.38
Green	773	3.06
Parti Indépendantiste	209	0.83

2008 Quebec general election
Party	Candidate	Votes	%	±%
Parti Québécois	Bernard Drainville	11,026	51.56	+11.96
Liberal	Isabelle Mercille	6,185	28.92	+7.52
Action démocratique	Roger Dagenais	2,369	11.08	-17.32
Québec solidaire	Sebastien Robert	957	4.48	-0.60
Green	Real Langelier	665	3.11	-1.64
Parti indépendantiste	Yves Menard	182	0.85	
Total valid votes		21,384	98.22	
Total rejected ballots		388	1.78	+0.52
Turnout		21,772	53.29	-15.26
Electors on the lists		40,858	–	
Parti Québécois hold		Swing		+2.22

2007 Quebec general election
Party	Candidate	Votes	%	±%
Parti Québécois	Bernard Drainville	11,055	39.61	-5.78
Action démocratique	Roger Dagenais	7,927	28.40	+12.81
Liberal	Nic Leblanc	5,974	21.40	-13.52
Québec solidaire	Cyr François	1,418	5.08	+3.47
Green	Réal Langelier	1,327	4.75	
Bloc Pot	Richard Lemagnifique	211	0.76	-0.89
Total valid votes		27,912	98.74	
Total rejected ballots		357	1.26	-0.43
Turnout		28,269	68.54	+1.50
Electors on the lists		41,242	–	
Parti Québécois hold		Swing		-9.30

^ QS change is from UFP.

2003 Quebec general election
Party	Candidate	Votes	%	±%
Parti Québécois	Cécile Vermette	12,736	45.39	-6.30
Liberal	Jean-Marc Pelletier	9,799	34.92	+2.39
Action démocratique	Michel Lalonde	4,374	15.59	+2.24
Bloc Pot	Pierre Losier-Côté	462	1.65	+0.61
UFP	Marc Lambert	452	1.61	+0.80
Independent	Daniel Tavéra	134	0.48	
Christian Democracy	Olivier Waché	104	0.37	
Total valid votes		28,061	98.31	
Total rejected ballots		483	1.69	+0.27
Turnout		28,544	67.05	-8.19
Electors on the lists		42,574	–	
Parti Québécois hold		Swing		-4.34

^ UFP change is from Socialist Democracy.

1998 Quebec general election
Party	Candidate	Votes	%	±%
Parti Québécois	Cécile Vermette	15,692	51.68	-4.51
Liberal	Gilbert Côté	9,876	32.53	-0.09
Action démocratique	Simon Larivière	4,054	13.35	+4.58
Bloc Pot	Christian Marcoux	316	1.04	
Socialist Democracy	Pierre Klépock	245	0.81	
Innovator	Jimmy Audet	179	0.59	
Total valid votes		30,362	98.57	
Total rejected ballots		439	1.43	-1.11
Turnout		30,081	75.23	-5.10
Electors on the lists		40,940	–	
Parti Québécois hold		Swing		-2.21

1995 Quebec referendum
Side	Votes	%
Oui	22,731	60.54
Non	14,814	39.46

1994 Quebec general election
Party	Candidate	Votes	%	±%
Parti Québécois	Cécile Vermette	17,611	56.19	+2.51
Liberal	Serge Privé	10,221	32.61	-7.05
Action démocratique	Simone Jocelyne Larivière	2,749	8.77	
Independent	Moncef Guitouni	383	1.22	
Natural Law	Sylvain Latour	376	1.20	
Total valid votes		31,340	97.47	
Total rejected ballots		814	2.53	-0.60
Turnout		32,154	80.34	+5.42
Electors on the lists		40,023	–	
Parti Québécois hold		Swing		+4.78

1989 Quebec general election
Party	Candidate	Votes	%	±%
Parti Québécois	Cécile Vermette	13,582	53.68	+5.93
Liberal	Michel Timpério	10,036	39.67	-6.81
Green	Bernard Lapierre	1,360	5.38	
Pour la république du Canada	Alain Gauthier	197	0.78	+0.46
Marxist–Leninist	Serge Lachapelle	125	0.49	
Total valid votes		25,300	96.86	
Total rejected ballots		819	3.14	+0.83
Turnout		26,119	74.92	+2.36
Electors on the lists		34,862	–	
Parti Québécois hold		Swing		+6.37

1985 Quebec general election
Party	Candidate	Votes	%	±%
Parti Québécois	Cécile Vermette	12,568	47.75	+9.16
Liberal	Guy Pratt	12,233	46.48	-11.91
New Democratic	François Desgroseilliers	884	3.36	
Parti indépendantiste	Omer Thériault	346	1.31	
United Social Credit	Bella Forget Bélanger	122	0.46	
Commonwealth of Canada	Manon Gravel	83	0.32	-0.30
Christian Socialist	Nicole Morse	83	0.32	
Total valid votes		26,319	97.69	
Total rejected ballots		622	2.31	+0.21
Turnout		26,941	72.56	+16.13
Electors on the lists		37,131	–	
Parti Québécois gain from Liberal		Swing		+10.53

58 year old former priest Guy Pratt, the son of former Longueuil mayor Paul Pratt was the Liberal candidate. He took on 33 year old Longueuil alderman Pierre Nantel who ran for the PQ.

Quebec provincial by-election, June 18, 1984
Party	Candidate	Votes	%
Liberal	Guy Pratt	11,477	58.39
Parti Québécois	Pierre Nantel	7,586	38.59
Independent	Patricia Métivier	474	2.41
Parti république du Québec	Jean-Paul Ménard	120	0.61
Total valid votes		19,657	97.90
Total rejected ballots		421	2.10
Turnout		20,078	56.42
Electors on the lists		35,584	–

1981 Quebec general election
Party	Candidate	Votes	%
Parti Québécois	Pierre Marois	19,472	65.49
Liberal	Lise Vachon Marcotte	9,208	30.97
Union Nationale	Joseph Roland Grandmaison	772	2.60
Parti communiste ouvrier	Alain Saulnier	110	0.37
Marxist–Leninist	Michelle Dufort-Ginchereau	98	0.33
United Social Credit	Joseph Ranger	74	0.25
Total valid votes		29,734	
Rejected and declined votes		377	
Turnout		30,111	81.83
Electors on the lists		36,799	

== See also ==
- List of Quebec provincial electoral districts
- Canadian provincial electoral districts
