= Rhéal Fortin =

Canadian lawyer and politician

Rhéal Fortin MP
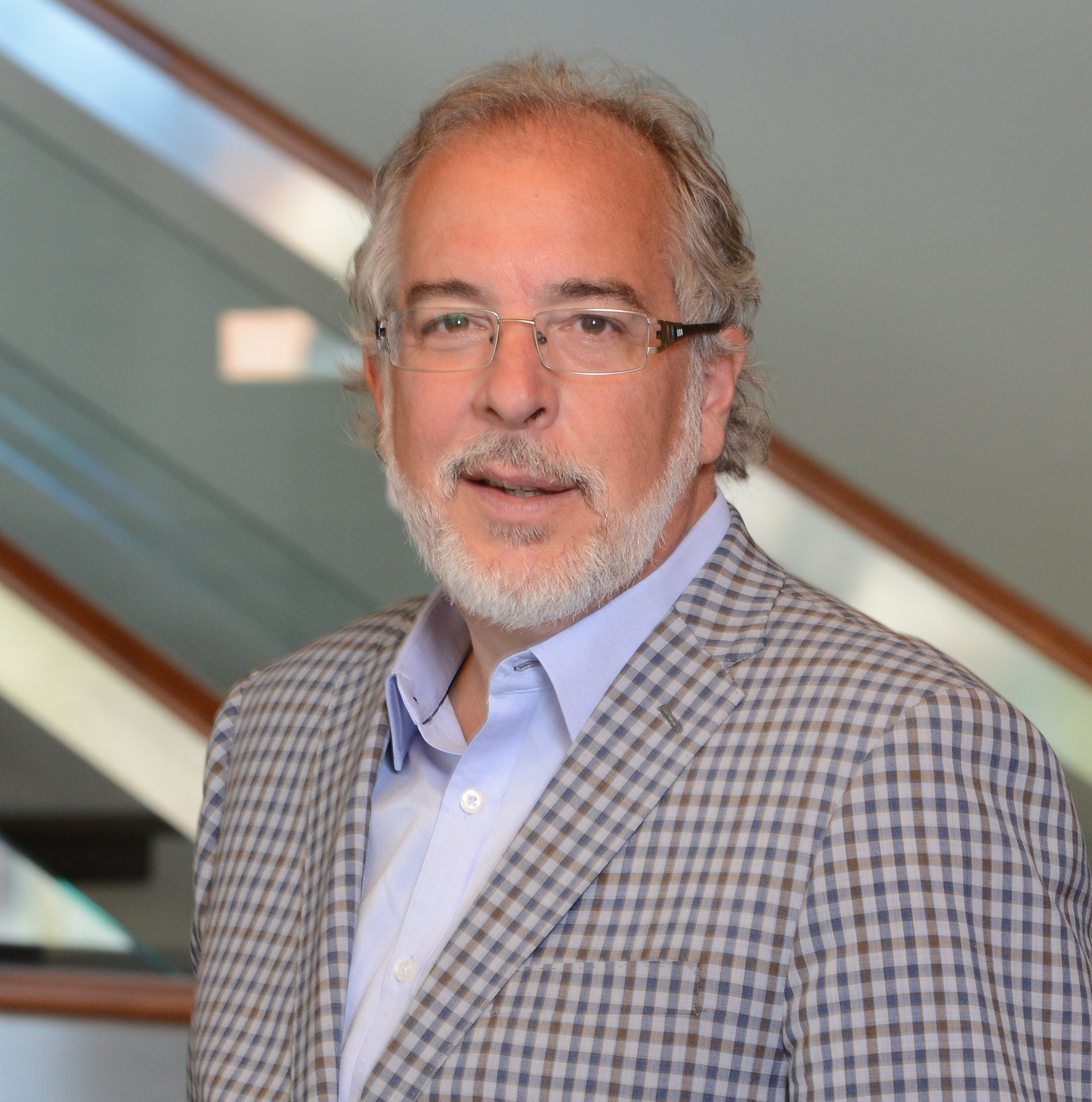

Spokesperson of Québec debout Groupe parlementaire québécois (March — June)
- In office March 21, 2018 – September 17, 2018
- Preceded by: Caucus founded
- Succeeded by: Caucus dissolved

Interim Leader of the Bloc Québécois
- In office October 22, 2015 – March 18, 2017
- Preceded by: Gilles Duceppe
- Succeeded by: Martine Ouellet

Member of Parliament for Rivière-du-Nord
- Incumbent
- Assumed office October 19, 2015
- Preceded by: Pierre Dionne Labelle

Personal details
- Born: Rhéal Éloi Fortin Laval-des-Rapides, Quebec, Canada
- Party: Bloc Québécois
- Other political affiliations: Québec debout (2018)
- Profession: Lawyer

Rhéal Éloi Fortin MP (French: [ʁeal fɔʁtɛ̃]) is a Canadian lawyer and politician, who is the member of the House of Commons for Rivière-du-Nord.

A lawyer by profession, he is the president of Bissonnette Fortin Giroux, a law firm in Saint-Jérôme. He studied law at University of Sherbrooke. He was elected to the House of Commons of Canada in the 2015 election for Rivière-du-Nord as a member of the Bloc Québécois,

Fortin was named interim leader of the Bloc Québécois on October 22, 2015 following the resignation of Gilles Duceppe as leader after Duceppe was unable to win his seat in the election.

He served as interim leader of the party until the next leader, Martine Ouellet was named on March 18, 2017.

Fortin and six other Bloc MPs resigned from the Bloc's caucus to sit as independent MPs on February 28, 2018 citing conflicts with Ouellet's leadership. Fortin then served as leader of the party formed by the dissidents, Québec debout. He rejoined the Bloc Québécois caucus on September 17, 2018.

== Biography ==
Fortin was born in Laval-des-Rapides, Quebec. He started working when he was 18. He completed a CEGEP electrician's diploma, equivalent to junior college. He was a worker in a factory in Laval from 1977 to 1985, then left to attend university to study law. After completing his legal education, he began practising law in Saint-Jérôme in 1992.

At the time of the 2025 Canadian federal election, he lived in Saint-Sauveur-des-Monts.

== Political career ==
He has been politically active ever since high school, when he volunteered to put up lawn signs for the Parti Québécois. He ran for the Parti Québécois nomination for the election for the National Assembly of Quebec for Prévost, but lost to Gilles Robert. In 2015 he ran for the Bloc Québécois in the riding Rivière-du-Nord and won. He became the interim leader of Bloc Québécois on October 22, 2015. On December 7, 2016, he announced that he would not be seeking the permanent leadership of the party at its leadership election in 2017.

He served as the BQ's critic for intergovernmental affairs, human rights, justice, and access to information in the House of Commons until February 2018, when he and six other Bloc MPs quit the caucus and formed the Groupe parlementaire québécois in protest of Martine Ouellet's leadership style. Fortin was named the group's spokesperson on March 21, 2018.

He served as the justice critic in the Bloc Québécois Shadow Cabinet of the 44th Parliament of Canada.

He was elected vice chair of the Canadian House of Commons Standing Committee on Justice and Human Rights in the 45th Canadian Parliament in 2025.

== Electoral record ==
2025 Canadian federal election: Rivière-du-Nord
Party	Candidate	Votes	%	±%	Expenditures
Bloc Québécois	Rhéal Fortin	25,438	43.85	−7.75	
Liberal	Mary-Helen Walton	18,345	31.62	+9.15	
Conservative	Patricia Morrissette	12,203	21.03	+8.99	
New Democratic	Christel Marchand	2,032	3.50	−3.38	
Total valid votes/expense limit		58,018	97.73		
Total rejected ballots		1,349	2.27		
Turnout		59,367	63.42		
Eligible voters		93,608			
Bloc Québécois notional hold		Swing		−8.45	
Source: Elections Canada
Note: number of eligible voters does not include voting day registrations.

2021 Canadian federal election: Rivière-du-Nord
Party	Candidate	Votes	%	±%	Expenditures
Bloc Québécois	Rhéal Fortin	29,943	52.2	+0.2	$17,137.18
Liberal	Theodora Bajkin	12,767	22.3	±0.0	$5,481.12
Conservative	Patricia Morrissette	6,803	11.9	+0.1	$17,935.40
New Democratic	Marie-Helen Paspaliaris	3,958	6.9	-0.1	$703.54
People's	Keeyan Ravanshid	2,164	3.8	+3.1	$1,391.38
Free	Marie-Eve Damour	1,036	1.8	N/A	$733.88
Rhinoceros	Jean-François René	373	0.7	N/A	$0.00
Indépendance du Québec	Nicolas Riqueur-Lainé	285	0.5	+0.1	$0.00
Total valid votes/expense limit		57,329	97.7	–	$126,251.14
Total rejected ballots		1,327	2.3		
Turnout		58,656	59.1		
Eligible voters		99,292			
Bloc Québécois hold		Swing		+0.1	
Source: Elections Canada

2019 Canadian federal election: Rivière-du-Nord
Party	Candidate	Votes	%	±%	Expenditures
Bloc Québécois	Rhéal Fortin	31,281	52.0	+20.0	$14,299.86
Liberal	Florence Gagnon	13,402	22.3	-4.1	$53,916.68
Conservative	Sylvie Fréchette	7,120	11.8	+3.3	$28,363.50
New Democratic	Myriam Ouellette	4,194	7.0	-23.1	none listed
Green	Joey Leckman	3,345	5.6	+3.1	$7,366.15
People's	Normand Michaud	407	0.7	–	$45.01
Indépendance du Québec	Nicolas Riqueur-Lainé	225	0.4	–	$117.25
Independent	Lucie St-Gelais	127	0.2	–	$0.00
Total valid votes/expense limit		60,101	100.0		
Total rejected ballots		1,206			
Turnout		61,307	64.0		
Eligible voters		95,813			
Bloc Québécois hold		Swing		+12.05	
Source: Elections Canada

2015 Canadian federal election: Rivière-du-Nord
Party	Candidate	Votes	%	±%	Expenditures
Bloc Québécois	Rhéal Fortin	18,157	32.05	+3.85	–
New Democratic	Pierre Dionne Labelle	17,077	30.14	-24.98	–
Liberal	Janice Bélair Rolland	14,933	26.36	+19.91	–
Conservative	Romain Vignol	4,793	8.46	+0.03	–
Green	Joey Leckman	1,436	2.53	+0.74	–
Rhinoceros	Fobozof A. Côté	261	0.46	–	–
Total valid votes/Expense limit		56,657	100.0		$229,198.01
Total rejected ballots		1,044	–	–	
Turnout		57,701	65.13	–	
Eligible voters		88,586			
Bloc Québécois gain from New Democratic		Swing		+14.42	
Source: Elections Canada
