= Nicolas Marceau =

Canadian politician (born 1964)

Nicolas Marceau MNA

Quebec Minister of Finance
- Incumbent
- Assumed office October 21, 2026
- Premier: Paul St-Pierre Plamondon
- Preceded by: Eric Girard
- In office September 19, 2012 – April 23, 2014
- Premier: Pauline Marois
- Preceded by: Raymond Bachand
- Succeeded by: Carlos Leitão

Member of the National Assembly of Quebec for Marie-Victorin
- Incumbent
- Assumed office October 5, 2026
- Preceded by: Shirley Dorismond

Member of the National Assembly of Quebec for Rousseau
- In office September 21, 2009 – October 1, 2018
- Preceded by: François Legault
- Succeeded by: Louis-Charles Thouin

Personal details
- Born: June 23, 1964 (age 62) Montreal, Quebec, Canada
- Party: Parti Québécois
- Education: Queens University; Université de Montréal
- Profession: Economist

Nicolas Marceau (French pronunciation: [nikɔla maʁso]; born June 23, 1964) is a Canadian politician and economist who was elected to the National Assembly of Quebec in a by-election on September 21, 2009, representing the electoral district of Rousseau as a member of the Parti Québécois. He was previously a professor of economics at the Université du Québec à Montréal.

In 2026, Marceau returned to the National Assembly, representing Marie-Victorin. He has served as minister of finance in the governments of Pauline Marois and Paul St-Pierre Plamondon.

== Personal life and education ==
Marceau was born in Montreal. With roots in Quebec City, his paternal grandfather and his father, Claude, were physicians; Claude was an ENT surgeon who was friends with Parti Québécois founder René Lévesque. Nicolas and his sister lived with their mother in LeMoyne after their parents' separation when he was a young child. As a university student he worked four summers at the Île Sainte-Hélène municipal swimming pool before finding a summer job at Les Coopérants life insurance company in the internal audit department—his only experience in the financial sector before becoming Quebec's finance minister.

His education includes bachelor and master of science degrees from Université de Montréal and a doctorate from Queen's University, all in economics. His thesis supervisor was Robin Boadway.

Marceau speaks both French and English fluently. He has four daughters.

== University career ==
He was an economics professor at Laval University from 1992 to 1996, and at Université du Québec à Montréal from 1996 to 2009. He has published 29 articles in academic journals in the field of public economic policy, including in The American Economic Review. He won UQAM's teaching award five times, and was a co-recipient of the 2002 Harry Johnson Prize.

In 2001 he was a member of the Seguin commission which examined the possible fiscal imbalance between the federal and provincial governments.

== Political career ==
In June 2009 Pauline Marois asked him to run for office at a time when the PQ was looking to increase its economic credentials, following the departure of François Legault. He was elected as a member of the National Assembly of Quebec in a September 2009 by-election, and was Official Opposition critic for finance from 2010 to 2012. He became finance minister in 2012 immediately after the PQ won a minority government in the Quebec general election of 2012. His first budget brought controversy because of backing out of the party's election promise to eliminate the province's health tax. He has continued to emphasize a priority of eliminating Quebec's deficit. He lost his seat in the 2018 Quebec general election to the Coalition Avenir Quebec, but returned as an MLA and finance minister in 2026.

== Electoral history ==
2026 Quebec general election: Marie-Victorin
** Preliminary results — Not yet official **
Party	Candidate	Votes	%	±%
Parti Québécois	Nicolas Marceau	9,205	33.34	
Québec solidaire	Lauréline Manassero	5,782	20.94	
Liberal	Lyes Chekal	5,600	20.29	
Coalition Avenir Québec	Shirley Dorismond	3,722	13.48	
Conservative	Amélie Legeay	2,832	10.26	
Green	Michel Fortin	378	1.37	
Parti accès propriété et équité	Gabriel Landry	87	0.32	
Total valid votes				
Total rejected ballots				
Turnout			63.01	
Electors on the lists			–	–
Source: Élections Québec

Quebec provincial government of Pauline Marois
Cabinet post (1)
Predecessor	Office	Successor
Raymond Bachand	Minister of Finance; September 19, 2012–April 23, 2014	Carlos Leitão
