= Cécile Vermette =

Canadian politician and nurse

Cécile Vermette (French pronunciation: [sesil vɛʁmɛt]; born January 19, 1945) is a former nurse and political figure in Quebec. She represented Marie-Victorin in the Quebec National Assembly from 1985 to 2007 as a member of the Parti Québécois.

She was born in Montreal, the daughter of Antonio Vermette and Doria Dubeau, and was educated at the Collège Régina Assumpta, the Hôpital Saint-Luc and the Université de Montréal. She served as government whip from 1994 to 1996 and was deputy government leader from 2002 to 2003. Vermette retired from politics in 2007.
