= Climat Québec =

- Leader: Martine Ouellet
- Founder: Martine Ouellet
- Founded: May 14, 2021
- Split from: Parti Québécois
- Headquarters: 160 rue Principale, Saint-Roch-de-Richelieu, Quebec, J0L 2M0
- Ideology: Environmentalism; Quebec sovereigntism
- Political position: Centre-left
- Colours: Dark Lime Green; Dark Blue
- Seats in National Assembly: 0 / 127

Website
- climat.quebec

Climat Québec (French pronunciation: [klima kebɛk]) is a minor political party in the Canadian province of Quebec founded in 2021 by Martine Ouellet, a former cabinet minister in the government of Pauline Marois and leader of the Bloc Québécois.

The party ran 54 candidates the 2022 Quebec general election and 52 candidates in the 2026 Quebec general election.

The party contested the Marie-Victorin by-election in April 2022, triggered by the resignation of Catherine Fournier, with Ouellet as its candidate. She received 1.9% of the vote, earning sixth place of 12 candidates in the by-election. The party has also contested the 2023 Saint-Henri—Sainte-Anne provincial by-election, 2023 Jean-Talon provincial by-election, 2025 Terrebonne provincial by-election, 2025 Arthabaska provincial by-election, and 2026 Chicoutimi provincial by-election.

== Ideology ==
Similarly to the Parti Québécois, which Ouellet was once part of, Climat Québec positions itself on the centre-left of the Canadian political spectrum but intends to focus on the climate crisis and secession of Quebec from Canada. The party opposes lobbies and corporate interests; its favors cancelling the Alto high-speed rail project between Toronto and Quebec City to instead focus on modernization existing networks and establishing rail links between Quebec City and Montreal.

== Electoral results ==
Election	Leader	Candidates	Elected	Votes	%	Place
2022	Martine Ouellet	54 / 125	0	8,644	0.21	8th
2026	Martine Ouellet	52 / 127	0	11,709	0.27	7th
