= Catherine Fournier (Canadian politician) =

Mayor of Longueuil, Canada since 2021

Her Worship Catherine Fournier
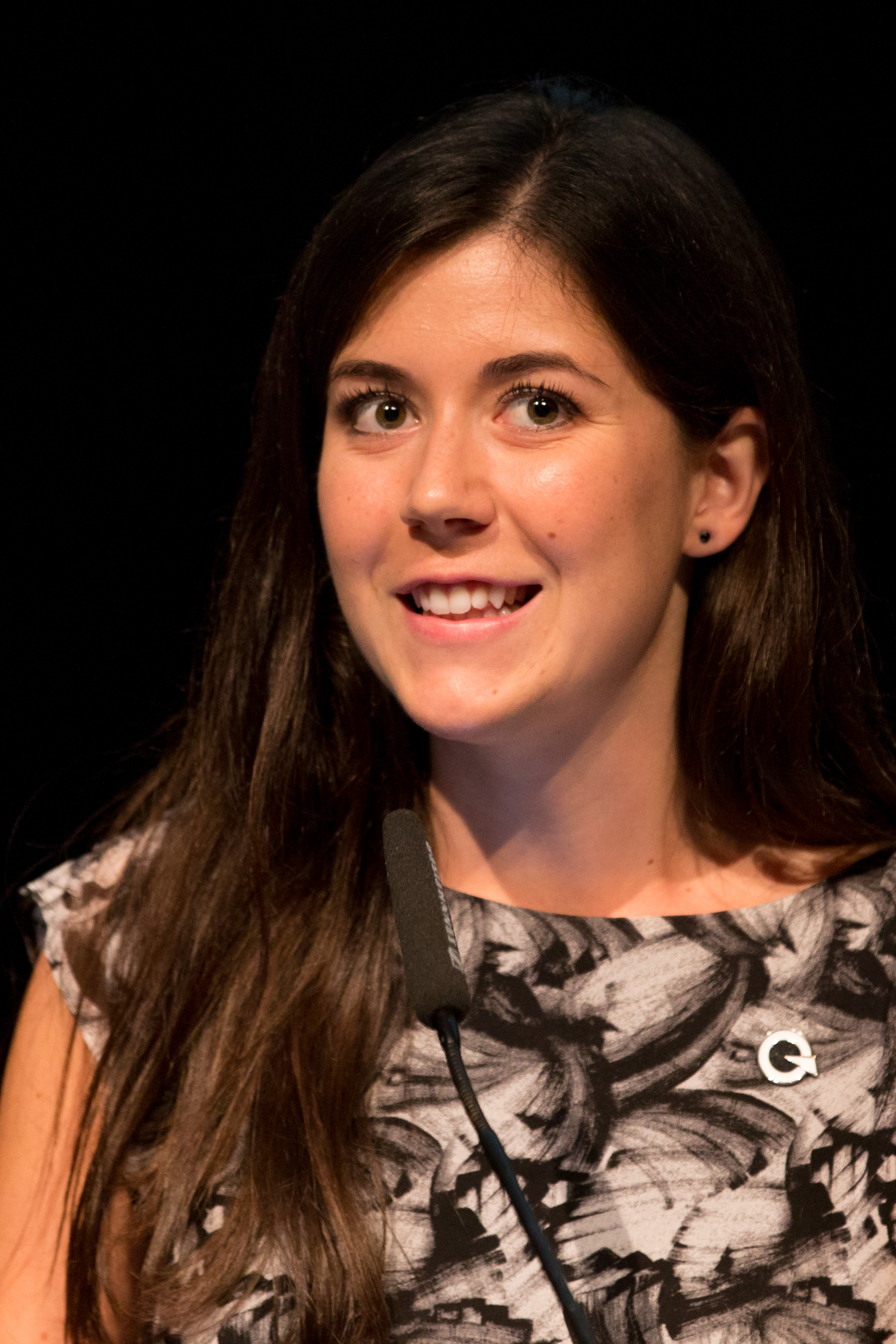
- Catherine Fournier in 2018

Mayor of Longueuil
- Incumbent
- Assumed office November 14, 2021
- Preceded by: Sylvie Parent

Member of the National Assembly of Quebec for Marie-Victorin
- In office December 5, 2016 – November 7, 2021
- Preceded by: Bernard Drainville
- Succeeded by: Shirley Dorismond

Personal details
- Born: 7 April 1992 (age 34) Sainte-Julie, Quebec
- Party: Independent (2019–2021)
- Other political affiliations: Parti Québécois (before 2019) Coalition Longueuil (2021-present)

Catherine Fournier (French pronunciation: [katʁin fuʁnje]; born 7 April 1992) is a Canadian politician, who was elected as mayor of Longueuil on November 7, 2021 and was re-elected on November 2, 2025. She is the third female mayor in the city's history.

She was previously member of the National Assembly of Quebec, having been elected in a by-election on December 5, 2016 at the age of 24. She represented the electoral district of Marie-Victorin. Fournier was the youngest member of the National Assembly, and the youngest woman ever elected to that body.

Originally elected as a member of the Parti Québécois, Fournier won a full term in 2018 even amid the PQ's meltdown in Greater Montreal; she was the only surviving PQ member from the metro area. However, she quit the PQ on March 11, 2019 to sit as an independent MNA. She believed the party had lost its way ideologically, though she still considers herself a committed sovereigntist.

Before her election to the National Assembly, Fournier ran for the Bloc Québécois in the 2015 federal election in the riding of Montarville, finishing second. After her defeat, she was named as the party's vice-president. A few weeks later, Fournier left the Bloc Québécois position to join Parti Québécois as a political attaché of PQ leader Pierre Karl Péladeau.

== Early life ==
Fournier was born in Sainte-Julie, Quebec on 7 April 1992. She holds an economics major and political science minor from the Université de Montréal. She was a political blogger and columnist for 103.3 FM.

== Sexual assault ==
In 2023, Fournier revealed she had been the victim of sexual assault by Harold LeBel, a former Quebec MNA. The assault took place during the evening of October 20, 2017, while Fournier and Lebel, who were PQ MNAs at that time, were in Rimouski to introduce their party's plan to combat poverty.

In 2022, LeBel was found guilty of sexual assault by a jury and sentenced to 8 months in prison. The identity of the victim had been under a publication ban, but Fournier requested that the ban be lifted in 2023.

== Electoral record ==
=== Federal ===
Montarville

2015 Canadian federal election
Party	Candidate	Votes	%	±%	Expenditures
Liberal	Michel Picard	18,848	32.54	+20.03	–
Bloc Québécois	Catherine Fournier	16,460	28.42	-0.66	–
New Democratic	Djaouida Sellah	14,296	24.68	-19.85	–
Conservative	Stéphane Duranleau	6,284	10.85	+1.25	–
Green	Olivier Adam	1,388	2.40	-0.05	–
Libertarian	Claude Leclair	641	1.11	–	–
Total valid votes/Expense limit		57,917	100.00		$207,758.92
Total rejected ballots		881	1.50	–	
Turnout		58,798	77.86	–	
Eligible voters		75,521			
Liberal gain from New Democratic		Swing		+19.94	
Source: Elections Canada

=== Provincial ===
2018 Quebec general election: Marie-Victorin
Party	Candidate	Votes	%	±%
Parti Québécois	Catherine Fournier	8,952	30.82	-21.68
Coalition Avenir Québec	Martyne Prévost	8,247	28.39	+14.24
Québec solidaire	Carl Lévesque	6,295	21.67	+7.48
Liberal	Sonia Ziadé	4,418	15.21	+1.77
Green	Laeticia Poiré-Hill	625	2.15	-0.47
New Democratic	Myriam de Grandpré-Ruel	310	1.07	
CINQ	Shirley Cedent	98	0.34	+0.09
Marxist–Leninist	Pierre Chénier	60	0.21	
Équipe Autonomiste	Florent Portron	45	0.15	-0.03
Total valid votes		29,050	98.16	
Total rejected ballots		546	1.84	+0.64
Turnout		29,596	62.91	+37.20
Eligible voters		47,044		
Parti Québécois hold		Swing		-17.96
Source(s) "Rapport des résultats officiels du scrutin". Élections Québec.

Marie-Victorin

Quebec provincial by-election, 2016
Party	Candidate	Votes	%	±%
Parti Québécois	Catherine Fournier	6,302	52.49	+14.33
Québec solidaire	Carl Lévesque	1,703	14.19	+2.62
Coalition Avenir Québec	Julie Chapdelaine	1,699	14.15	-6.45
Liberal	Normand Parisien	1,613	13.44	-12.61
Green	Vincent Charbonneau	315	2.62	+0.30
Option nationale	Fabien Villemaire	109	0.91	+0.11
Parti travailliste du Québec	Roch Dumont	101	0.84	
Conservative	Hoang Nam Nguyen	90	0.75	
Changement intégrité pour notre Québec	Shirley Cedent	30	0.25	
Équipe Autonomiste	Florent Portron	22	0.18	+0.04
Parti indépendantiste	Étienne Turgeon Pelletier	21	0.17	
Total valid votes		12,005	100.00	
Total rejected ballots		147	1.21	-0.70
Turnout		12,152	25.71	-40.62
Electors on the lists		47,267		
Parti Québécois hold		Swing		+5.85
