= Équipe Autonomiste =

Autonomist Team Équipe autonomiste
- Leader: Steve Thérion (interim)
- Founder: Éric Barnabé
- Founded: March 21, 2012
- Split from: Action démocratique du Québec
- Ideology: Quebec autonomism Quebec nationalism Cultural conservatism Economic liberalism Men's rights Anti-multiculturalism; Anti-reverse racism
- Political position: Right-wing
- Seats in the National Assembly: 0 / 127

Website
- www.equipeautonomiste.ca

Équipe autonomiste (French pronunciation: [ekip otɔnɔmist]; English: Autonomist Team) is a Quebec autonomist provincial political party in Quebec, Canada. It was officially recognized on March 21, 2012 by the Chief Electoral Officer of Quebec.

The party was founded by Eric Barnabe, a former member of the Action démocratique du Québec (ADQ), who had worked as president of a riding association.

Other actors involved in the ADQ contributed to the party's founding: • Carol Nadeau became the party's official agent and representative. • Stephan Pouleur later became the party's leader and the party's main ambassador for 12 years after its founding.

The party was founded in response to the merger of the ADQ with the Coalition Avenir Québec (CAQ).

Since a merged party cannot keep the same name, ADQ members rejecting the vision proposed by François Legault's CAQ chose to create a new party. The name of the party, Equipe Autonomiste, was chosen to signify and affirm autonomist values like the ADQ while wanting to work as a team with citizens.

== Party Characteristics ==
Equipe Autonomiste is a party that addresses several issues in Quebec and proposes citizen-based solutions that respect the party's values, while ensuring that the social, environmental, and economic impacts of its proposals are verified.

The following issues are highlighted: • Two-way gender equality (men's and women's status);

• Family law / inter-generational equity;

• Respect for Quebec's customs and traditions / Western values;

• Waste management / environmental efficiency;

• Immigration tailored to Quebec's needs and capacity;

• Abolition of by-elections in Quebec / government effectiveness;

== Election results ==
Election	Candidates	Elected candidates	Popular vote	
Election	Candidates	Elected candidates	#	%
2012	17	0	2,182	0.05%
2014	5	0	400	0.01%
2018	12	0	1,138	0.03%
2022	10	0	556	0.01%
2026	8	0	290	0.01%

== By-elections ==
Equipe Autonomiste has a tendency to participate in by-elections since its founding, despite its proposal to abolish this type of election.

== Election Posters ==
Most of the party's past election posters are available for consultation at the Bibliothèque et Archives nationales du Québec (BAnQ).

Political Actions

• Founding of the Emerging Parties' Symposium to Improve Democracy (2014). Collaboration with other emerging parties has led to an annual meeting with Élections Québec until 2024 to discuss how to improve Quebec's democracy and access to informed voting;

• Participation in various political events and rallies.

== Memorandums ==
• Submission of a Memorandum on energy (2013);

• Submission of a Memorandum on the Quebec's values charter(2014);

• Submission of a Memorandum on reciprocal gender equality (2016);

• Submission of a Memorandum on family rights (2018);

• Submission of a Memorandum on amending the electoral law (2024);

== Leaders ==
• Éric Barnabé, starting March 21, 2012;

• Gérald Nicolas, starting May 11, 2012;

• Guy Boivin, starting June 27, 2012;

• Stéphane Pouleur, interim, starting August 4, 2016;

• Steve Thérion, interim, starting October 27, 2022;

• Steve Thérion, starting November 18, 2023;

• Louis Chandonnet, interim, starting January 1, 2025;

== Official Agents ==
• Carol Nadeau, since March 21, 2012

== Officers ==
• Stephan Pouleur, since June 27, 2012;

• Hugues Fortin, since June 27, 2012;

• Louis Chandonnet, since August 4, 2016;

• Alain Giasson, since August 4, 2016;

• Guy Boivin, since January 1, 2025;

• Steve Therion, since January 1, 2025;
