= Parti Québécois leadership elections =

This page lists the results of leadership elections held by the Parti Québécois. From its formation in 1968 and until 2005 the party president served as party leader. Elections are by one member, one vote.

== 1968 leadership election ==
(Held on October 14, 1968)

- René Lévesque acclaimed

Levesque resigned as party president on June 20, 1985. Nadia Assimopoulos becomes interim president. Levesque however is usually regarded as remaining PQ leader during this period.

== 1985 leadership election ==
(Held September 29, 1985)

Candidate	Votes	Percentage
Pierre-Marc Johnson	56,925	58.7%
Pauline Marois	19,471	19.7%
Jean Garon	15,730	16.2%
Guy Bertrand	2,733	2.8%
Francine Lalonde	1,484	1.5%
Luc Gagnon	1,046	1.1%
Totals	96,974*	100.0%

*: Data calculated from the available results without asterisks.

Bernard Landry withdrew before voting.

Johnson resigned on November 10, 1987. Nadia Assimopoulos onces again becomes interim president and Guy Chevrette becomes interim parliamentary leader. Chevrette is usually regarded as the interim leader during this period.

== 1988 leadership election ==
(Held on March 18, 1988)

- Jacques Parizeau acclaimed

== 1996 leadership election ==
(Held on January 27, 1996)

- Lucien Bouchard acclaimed

== 2001 leadership election ==
(Held on March 2, 2001)

- Bernard Landry acclaimed

Bernard Landry resigned on June 6, 2005. Louise Harel was chosen interim parliamentary leader.

== 2005 leadership election ==
(Held on November 15, 2005)

Candidate	Votes	Percentage
André Boisclair	56,503	53.7%
Pauline Marois	32,166	30.6%
Richard Legendre	7,877	7.5%
Louis Bernard	5,775	5.5%
Pierre Dubuc	1,282	1.2%
Jean-Claude St-André	951	0.9%
Ghislain Lebel	458	0.4%
Jean Ouimet	247	0.2%
Gilbert Paquette	n/a *	n/a *
Totals	105,259	100%

- Eligible voters: 137,238
- Turnout: 76.69%

*: Gilbert Paquette withdrew and asked his supporters to vote for Pauline Marois on November 10, 2005.

Boisclair resigned on May 8, 2007. François Gendron was chosen interim leader.

== 2007 leadership election ==
(Held on June 27, 2007)

- Pauline Marois acclaimed

Gilles Duceppe was a candidate but withdrew after 24 hours.

== 2015 leadership election ==
(Held May 13–15, 2015)

- Pierre Karl Péladeau 57.58%
- Alexandre Cloutier 29.21%
- Martine Ouellet 13.21%
  - Eligible voters: 71,020
  - Turnout 79.9%

== 2016 leadership election ==
(Held October 7, 2016)

First round:

- Jean-François Lisée: 25,936 (47.03%)
- Alexandre Cloutier: 16,357 (29.66%)
- Martine Ouellet: 9,077 (16.46%)
- Paul St-Pierre Plamondon: 3,772 (6.84%)

Second round:

- Jean-François Lisée: 27,801 (50.63%)
- Alexandre Cloutier: 17,403 (31.70%)
- Martine Ouellet: 9,702 (17.67%)
  - Total votes: 55,142
  - Turnout: 75.09 per cent

== 2020 leadership election ==
(Held October 9, 2020)

Results by round
Candidate	1st round		2nd round		3rd round	
Candidate	Votes cast	%	Votes cast	%	Votes cast	%
Paul St-Pierre Plamondon	9,042	35.44%	10,554	41.59%	13,530	56.02%
Sylvain Gaudreault	8,415	32.98%	8,906	35.09%	10,621	43.98%
Guy Nantel	5,499	21.55%	5,917	23.32%	Eliminated	
Frédéric Bastien	2,559	10.03%	Eliminated			
Total	25,515	100%	25,377	100%	24,151	100%

== See also ==
- leadership convention
- Parti Québécois
