= Castonguay =

Castonguay is a surname. Notable people with this surname include:

- Alexandre Castonguay (born 1968), Canadian media artist
- Antoine Castonguay (1881–1959), Canadian politician
- Charles Castonguay (born 1940), Canadian mathematician
- Claude Castonguay (1929–2020), Canadian politician
- Émilie Castonguay, Canadian sports agent
- Éric Castonguay (born 1987), Canadian ice hockey player
- Jeannot Castonguay (born 1944), Canadian politician
- Marilyn Castonguay, Canadian actress
- Mike Castonguay, American musician
- Roch Castonguay, Canadian film and television actor
