= 2005 Parti Québécois leadership election =

- 13–15 November 2005
- Turnout: 76.69%
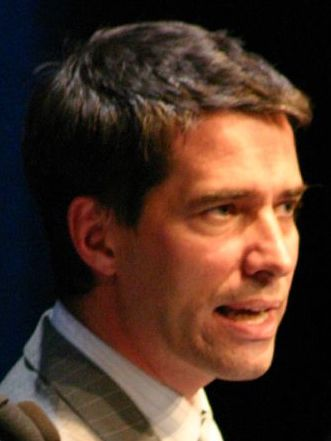

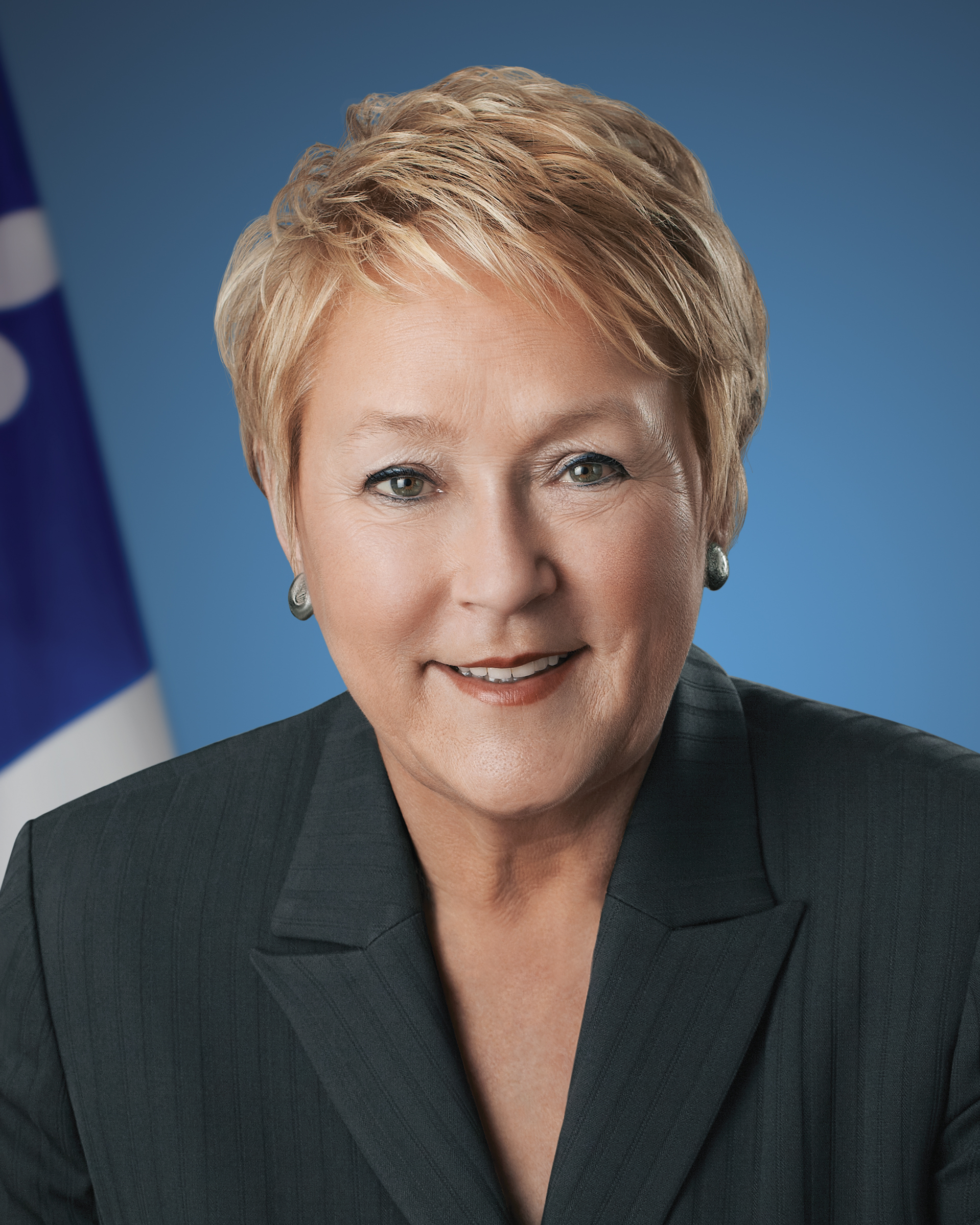
Candidate	André Boisclair	Pauline Marois
Votes	56,503	32,166
Percentage	53.7%	30.6%
	PQ	PQ
Candidate	Richard Legendre	Louis Bernard
Votes	7,877	5,775
Percentage	7.5%	5.5%
Leader before election
Bernard Landry
Elected Leader
André Boisclair

2005 Parti Québécois leadership election
- Date: November 13–15, 2005
- Resigning leader: Bernard Landry
- Won by: André Boisclair
- Ballots: 1
- Candidates: 8

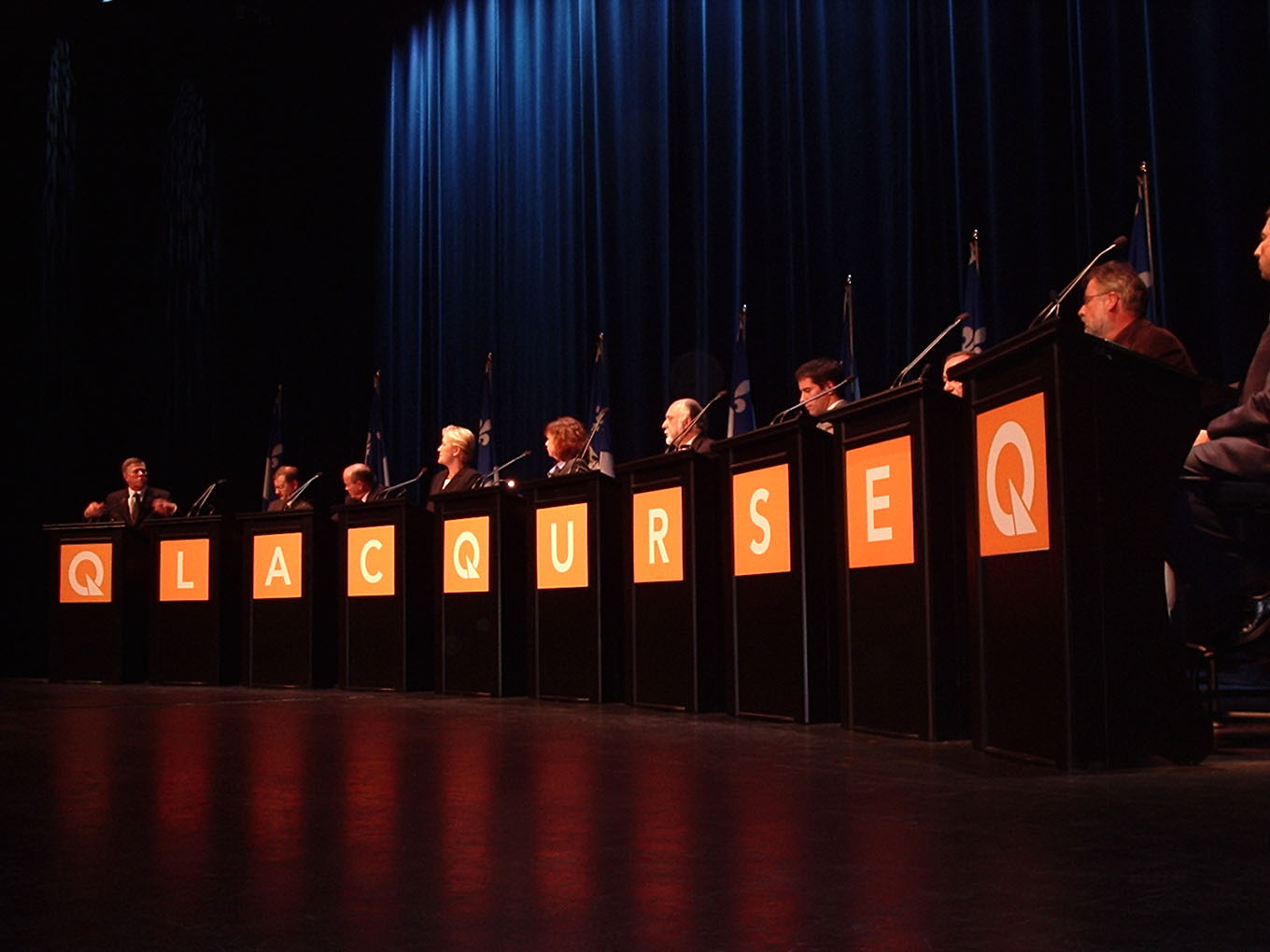
The nine candidates and the election president at the Quebec City public debate.

The Parti Québécois leadership election of 2005 was held from November 13 to November 15, 2005, to elect the new leader of the Parti Québécois, the main sovereigntist and social democratic political party in Quebec, Canada.

It was the second race of its kind in the history of the party, following the leadership election of 1985. It was conducted in two rounds, under a preferential voting system. Former Minister André Boisclair was elected at the first round ballot with 53.7% of votes from party members, making him the first openly gay leader of a major political party in North America, and one of the first in the world.

== Unfolding ==
=== Background ===
On June 4, 2005, party leader Bernard Landry announced his intention to resign as leader of the PQ after getting 76.2% in a vote of confidence in his leadership from delegates to the party National Council. The party appointed Louise Harel as its interim leader. Gilles Duceppe, leader of the federal-level sovereigntist political party, the Bloc Québécois, was expected to be a strong candidate if he had decided to run. On June 11, he however announced that he would remain leader of the Bloc despite pressure to make a bid for the leadership of the PQ.

=== Campaign ===
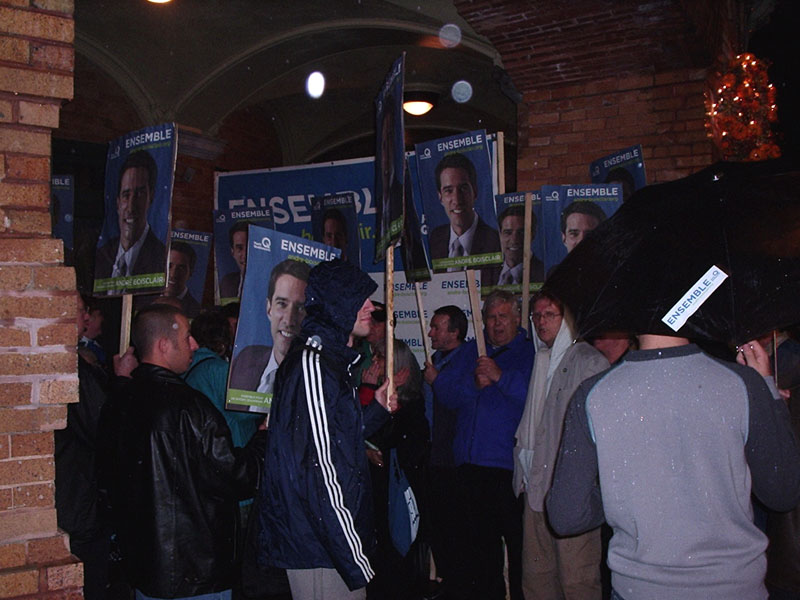
Supporters of Boisclair chant at the exit of a public debate.

After months of pre-campaign, the race officially began on September 15, 2005, the official deadline for entering the race. Soon, Boisclair emerged as a favorite in the polls, with Pauline Marois second, Richard Legendre a close third and Louis Bernard fourth. The validity of these polls, much touted by the media, was however challenged by some candidate organizations since they were conducted on the whole population of Quebec, rather than the actual voter pool, the legal members of the Parti Québécois. Also criticized was the intense media focus on the four candidates leading in these said polls, leaving the ideas of the other candidates in the dark. The later were much less discussed and their opening monologues were even cut for pundit commentary in LCN live broadcastings of the official candidates' debates.

An early, albeit brief issue in the campaign was the so-called Affaire Boisclair. On September 10, 2005, Le Devoir columnist Michel David referred in his column to a relatively unnoticed past article of Le Droit alluding to rumours of André Boisclair having lived a wild younger life and taken cocaine. Boisclair initially recognized a youth of partying and mistakes. Days later, after much media pressure, he admitted to having "consumed". Ironically, this only made his popularity stronger in polling, something credited by pundits to popular sympathy in the face of the weight of the media scrutiny. The fact that Boisclair came out in 2000 on the subject of his homosexuality did not hampered his campaign either. Polls showed that more than 90% of Quebecers were not opposed to a gay Premier of Quebec. On public perceptions, Pauline Marois also raised the theory that her campaign was hurt by the fact that she was female.

Boisclair, being the frontrunner, became the target of many other candidates and their supporters. Adding to the problematic "wild past" reputation the candidate had gained from the Affaire Boisclair, some progressive militants put into question Boisclair's left-wing values. A group of most progressive candidates, Pierre Dubuc, Jean Ouimet, Gilbert Paquette and Jean-Claude St-André, soon grew closer to Marois, not only because of her experience and her safer known past, but also because of perceived stronger progressive values. Shortly before the vote, Paquette withdrew, announcing his support for Marois. The left-wing SPQ-Libre faction of the party asked the Dubuc supporters to vote for Marois as second choice, as did Ouimet. Ghislain Lebel asked his supporters to vote for Boisclair on the second ballot.

=== Ideas ===
A number of ideas were put forward by the candidates, especially during the official candidates' debates held across Quebec. Amongst others, André Boisclair expounded a debt reduction plan and spoke of free higher education provided by the state. Richard Legendre talked much of more autonomy for Quebec regions. Pauline Marois spoke of water nationalization in an eventual Eau-Québec, like what was created with Hydro-Québec for electricity during the Quiet Revolution. As part of the struggle against poverty, Dubuc, Marois, Ouimet and Paquette supported a guaranteed minimum income system.

Many candidates focused on public transportation and wind power. Lebel was noted for the humour he brought to the debates. However, his more conservative political beliefs made him a black sheep in the midst of the largely progressive slate of candidates. St-André defended the ideas of the pur et dur party stream, notably that of making gestures of rupture with the rest of Canada, which were sovereign state actions before sovereignty contrary to the Canadian constitution. The strongest consensus between all candidates was that most of these projects were possible only through national independence.

== Vote ==
The voting was conducted by phone from November 13 to November 15, 2005, through a system used for popular votes for the Star Académie television show. The winner of the party leadership election was declared on November 15, 2005. The date was chosen in honour of the anniversary of the first electoral victory of the Parti Québécois on November 15, 1976. The election took place under a system of preferential voting in two rounds.

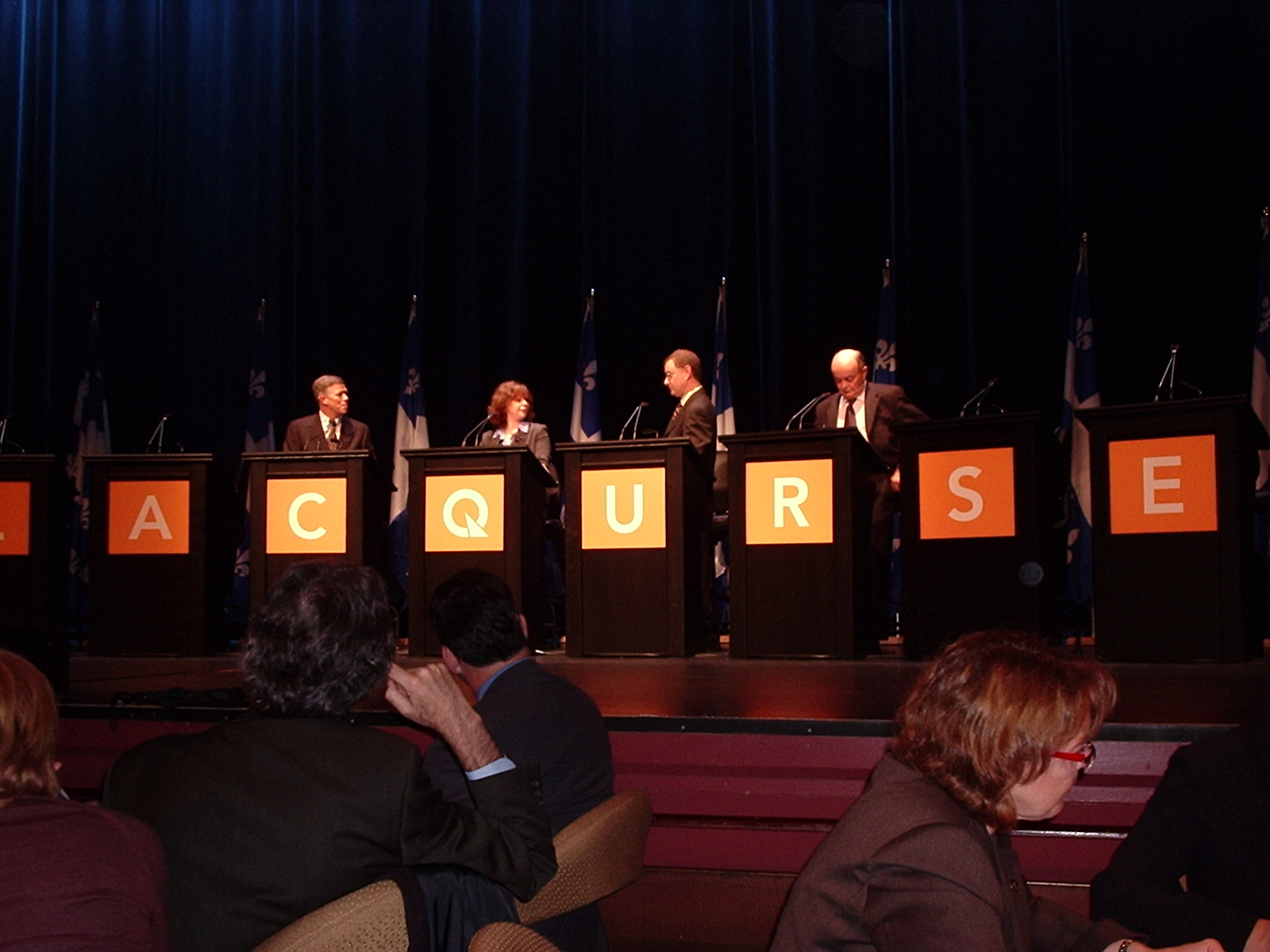
A threeway debate between Jean Ouimet, Jean-Claude St-André and Ghislain Lebel, presided by Lyne Marcoux.

== Public debates ==
The seven public debates were orchestrated by election president Lyne Marcoux. They were broadcast live via the Parti Québécois official website, pq.org, and the LCN television news channel. In order to allow substantial and orderly exchanges with such a number of people, every occasion was divided into a series of three discussions, amongst three candidates each. Candidate groupings were set at random. Additionally, for every debate, opening and closing speeches were addressed, and selected questions from the audience and the internet were debated. This selection was executed by an impartial panel led by Monique Richard, the party president.

=== Solidarity and public finances ===
The debate on solidarity and public finances took place on September 21, 2005, in Sherbrooke. On solidarity, the project of a guaranteed minimum income gathered Dubuc, Marois, Paquette and Ouimet. Boisclair said himself open to a debate on free higher education covered by the state and declared education his priority. He presented a public debt reduction plan. A fierce confrontation occurred between St-André and Boisclair when the former repeatedly challenged the latter to engage himself in fighting corporate tax evasion, which he finally did. Boisclair also defended the Zero Deficit policy of the previous Parti Québécois government of Lucien Bouchard, of which Boisclair was part.

=== Sustainable development and economy ===
The debate on sustainable development and economy took place on September 28, 2005, in Montreal. Most candidates focused on public transportation and wind power, with Marois promising water nationalization in the form of an "Eau-Québec" Crown corporation. Richard Legendre clashed with Boisclair over the latter's alleged slowness to trigger a referendum, with Boisclair supporting a referendum launched "as soon as possible during the next mandate" in line with the party's 2005 platform and Legendre advocating one within his first year in power. Legendre also criticized the way Boisclair adopted his moratorium on pigsties while being Minister of the Environment.

=== Culture ===
The debate on culture took place on October 12, 2005, in Trois-Rivières. Ouimet underlined that making sure artists never fall into the poverty gap is the way to have a healthy culture in Quebec. Candidates also discussion on the Charter of the French Language.

=== Sovereignty and leadership ===
The debate on sovereignty and leadership took place on October 19, 2005, in Quebec City. Since the method and pace of attaining independence was usually hotly debated in the party, media commentators predicted that it would be the most tumultuous of the seven. The debate was ultimately described as surprisingly non-confrontational.

=== Territory ===
The debate on territory took place on October 26, 2005, in Rimouski.

=== Education ===
The debate on education took place on November 2, 2005, in Saguenay.

=== Health ===
The debate on health took place on November 9, 2005, in Gatineau.

== Candidates ==
=== Official ===
Candidates listed have collected at least 1000 signatures from 40 different ridings, with a minimum of 10 signatures per riding. In order of official candidacy, they were:

- Richard Legendre - Former professional tennis player and former Minister of Sports. He is considered close to François Legault. Puts forward plans of more autonomy for Quebec regions.
- Louis Bernard - Former Chief of Staff to Parti Québécois Premier René Lévesque and former Secretary general of the Government to Parti Québécois Premiers René Lévesque and Jacques Parizeau.
- André Boisclair - Former Minister of the Environment and House Leader. Polls show him to be the frontrunner. Notably centers his plans on education (with plans of free, state-provided higher education) and debt reduction.
- Pauline Marois - Former Minister of Finance, former Minister of Education and former Deputy Premier of Quebec.
- Ghislain Lebel - Former Bloc Québécois Member of Parliament who quit his seat in 2002. He is more conservative than the other candidates and the party center and advocates a more traditional form of nationalism. Wishes that the party would do more to appeal to voters of the right-wing Action démocratique du Québec.
- Jean-Claude St-André - Parti Québécois Member of the National Assembly, considered a pur et dur close to Robert Laplante's strategy of gestures of rupture with Canada between an eventual PQ victory and the attainment of independence. Is a harsh critic of corporate tax evasion.
- Pierre Dubuc - Official candidate of the SPQ Libre left-wing and pro-union political club and editor of the left-wing paper L'aut'journal.
- Gilbert Paquette - Progressive former minister under René Lévesque.
- Jean Ouimet - Former head of the Green Party of Quebec and former adviser to Parti Québécois leader Jacques Parizeau. Has plans for sustainable development, wealth distribution (national and international), participatory democracy, the elaboration of a social contract and a party direction through collegiality.

=== Withdrawals ===
- Hugues Cormier - Physician and candidate in the riding of Crémazie in the 2003 election. Controversy brought him to pull out three days after officially entering the race.
- Gilles Hébert - Former public service union representative.
- Gilles Paquette - Former Parti Québécois candidate. Did not gather enough signatures in time for the deadline. Had a project of a sovereign Quebec state combining republicanism and monarchy, opposite to most of the final official candidates plans for a Quebec republic.

=== Declined ===
- Maxime Barakat - Militant of the Parti Québécois. Subsequently, supported Pauline Marois.
- Camil Bouchard - Member of the National Assembly. Threw his support behind Louis Bernard.
- Jean-Pierre Charbonneau - Former cabinet minister and former President of the National Assembly.
- Gilles Duceppe - Bloc Québécois leader. He declined, notably to honor his promise of contesting the next federal election at the BQ helm.
- Joseph Facal - Former cabinet minister considered more centrist than other PQ members. He cited the professional and family commitments that led him to quit the cabinet in 2003. He has since sided with candidate Pauline Marois.
- Bernard Landry - Former leader. A number of people requested that he become a candidate at the race for his own succession. After a summer reflection, the former Premier declined.
- Laurent M. Leclerc - Singer and actor.
- François Legault - Former cabinet minister and past well-known aspirant to the leadership. He cited family commitments.
- Daniel Turp - PQ Member of the National Assembly and past Member of Parliament for the Bloc Québécois. He declared his support for André Boisclair.

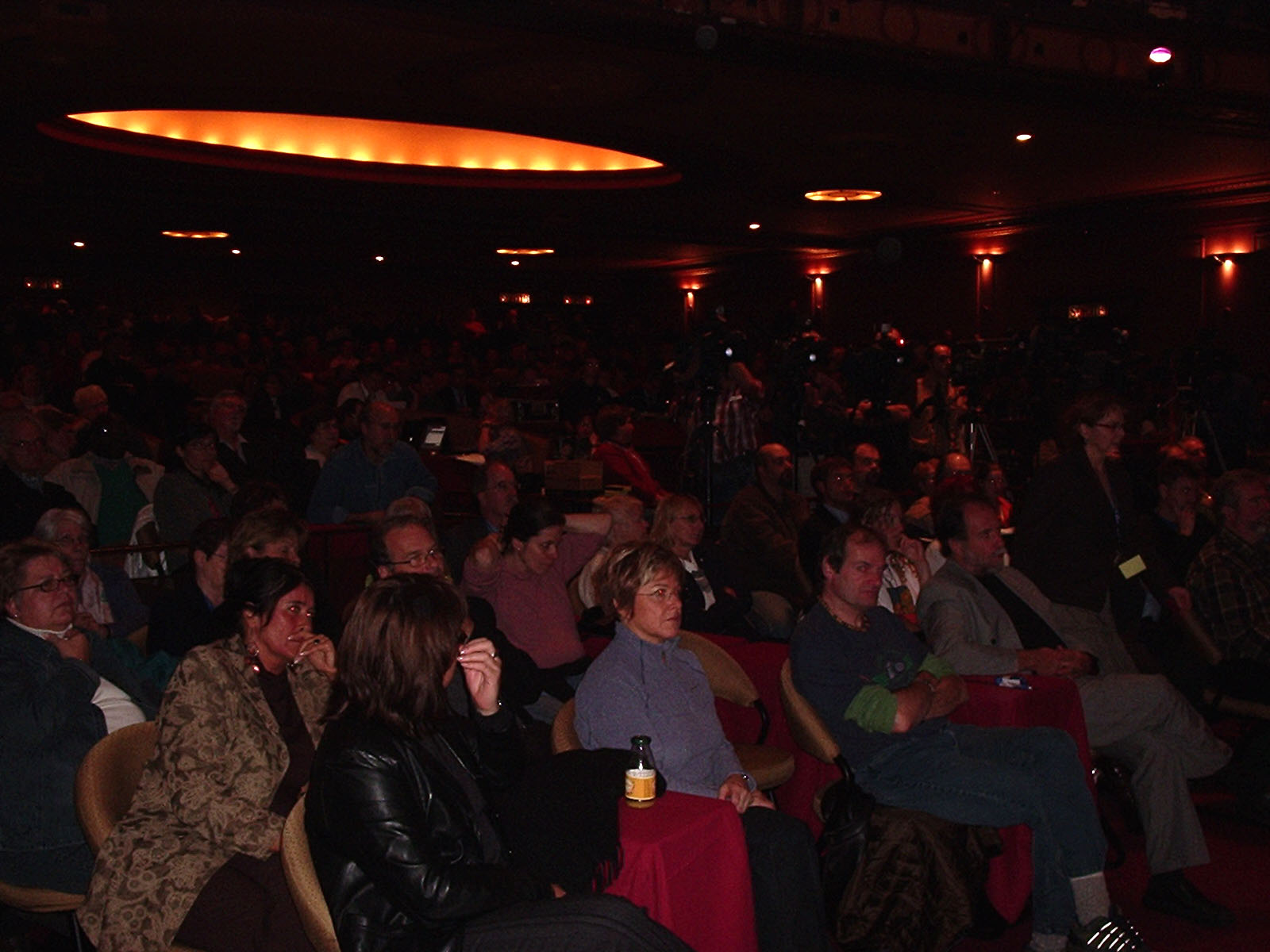
The audience of the Quebec City public debate, at which a number of people could not enter because of the importance of attendance.

== Timeline ==
- June 4, 2005 - Party leader Bernard Landry states his intention to resign as leader of the PQ after getting 76.2% in a vote of confidence at the Party National Council.
- June 5, 2005 - Former Parti Québécois minister Pauline Marois is first to announce her intention to enter the leadership race. The statement is criticized by some militants because of its haste, coming one day after the resignation speech of Bernard Landry.
- June 13, 2005 - Gilles Duceppe announces that he will not enter the race and will remain at the helm of the Bloc Québécois for the next federal election.
- June 13, 2005 - The party presents the official rules of the upcoming race.
- June 15, 2005 - An open letter to Bernard Landry is published in newspapers, including Le Devoir. It implores the former leader to become candidate in the race for his own succession for the sake of the cause of sovereignty. It is signed by over forty people (mostly from minorities), like Bloc Québécois MP Maka Kotto, Bloc Québécois past candidate and president of the PQ Montréal-Ville-Marie organisation Maria Mourani and past Bloc Québécois MP Osvaldo Nunez, notably. This follows the launch of "retourbernardlandry.org", an online petition sharing the same goal.
- July 11, 2005 - The candidacy of Richard Legendre is officially accepted by the party.
- July 30, 2005 - The candidacy of Louis Bernard is officially accepted by the party.
- August 5, 2005 - The candidacy of André Boisclair is officially accepted by the party.
- August 16, 2005 - Former leader Bernard Landry, after reflexion, ends the uncertainty around a possible candidacy of his to succeed himself. He officially renounces to become candidate and professes in faith in the capacity of the party to find a new leader and renew itself.
- August 18, 2005 - The candidacy of Pauline Marois is officially accepted by the party.
- August 19, 2005 - The candidacy of Ghislain Lebel is officially accepted by the party.
- August 25, 2005 - The candidacy of Jean-Claude St-André is officially accepted by the party.
- September 1, 2005 - Bloc Québécois MP and former Parti Québécois minister Serge Ménard announces his support for candidate Louis Bernard.
- September 2, 2005 - Days after official candidacy, psychiatrist Hugues Cormier resigns after being suspended by his employer, the Louis-Hippolyte-Lafontaine Hospital for asking patients to sign his candidacy slip.
- September 6, 2005 - Bloc Québécois MP Maka Kotto announces his support for Pauline Marois. He had previously favoured a return of Bernard Landry, until the latter's definite refusal of August 16.
- September 7, 2005 - Louise Harel, the Parti Québécois interim leader, speaks at a Bloc Québécois gathering and states that the PQ leadership candidates should debate, not battle.
- September 9, 2005 - Former Parti Québécois vice president Marie Malavoy announces her support for Pauline Marois. Référendum: Pauline Marois précise sa position
- September 9, 2005 - The candidacy of SPQ Libre representative Pierre Dubuc is officially accepted by the party.
- September 10, 2005 - Le Devoir columnist Michel David refers in his column to a relatively unnoticed past article of Le Droit alluding to rumors of André Boisclair having lived a wild younger life, taken cocaine and having been strongly reprimanded by then Parti Québécois leader Lucien Bouchard for it.
- September 12, 2005 - The candidacy of Gilbert Paquette is officially accepted by the party.
- September 13, 2005 - After having been brought to court because of alleged drunk driving, candidate Gilbert Paquette announces to a press conference that he intends to remain in the race.
- September 15, 2005 - Jean Ouimet becomes the ninth and last official candidate.
- September 15, 2005 - The deadline for entering the race, with the required 1,000 signatures, is reached, launching officially the race for the party leadership.
- September 16, 2005 - The party presents the nine official candidates.
- September 16, 2005 - At the party headquarters, André Boisclair is asked about the rumors surrounding his past. Boisclair denies a reprimand meeting with leader Lucien Bouchard, but admits that he had made "mistakes" in his youth.
- September 16, 2005 - At a brunch commemorating the 2004 Parti Québécois victory of Elsie Lefebvre in the Parti Libéral du Québec stronghold of Laurier-Dorion, former leader Bernard Landry states his hopes that the accusation excesses will cease, seemingly referring to the scrutiny around Boisclair's past personal life. He also enjoins militants in his speech, his first public speech since his resignation, to rally around the future elected leader, whoever he or she may be.
- September 18, 2005 - André Boisclair is a guest of the Tout le monde en parle television show.
- September 19, 2005 - At a Lévis press conference, when asked directly if he had ever taken cocaine, André Boiclair responds "What I want to tell you is I made mistakes, things I regret. Yes, I consumed. I can't be clearer than that."
- September 19, 2005 - The first official public debate is held at Sherbrooke on the subject of "solidarity & public finances".
- September 20, 2005 - Richard Legendre receives the support of Elsie Lefebvre and François Gendron, respectively the youngest and oldest Members of the National Assembly.
- September 28, 2005 - The second official public debate is held at Montreal on the subject of "sustainable development & economy".
- September 30, 2005 - Ghislain Lebel declares in an interview with Le Devoir that André Boisclair's victory seems unavoidable.
- October 4, 2005 - Jean Ouimet and Gilbert Paquette hold a common press conference during which they deplore the lack of media attention for the candidates and the importance put by them on population-wide polls that, they say, give wrong impressions, since the actual leadership vote is held only amongst party members. The two also speak of projects like the elaboration of a social contract, wealth redistribution in Quebec and the world and a provisional constitution before independence.
- October 6, 2005 - The Société Saint-Jean-Baptiste organizes a public debate on "language" at its home office of Montreal, the Maison Ludger-Duvernay. Seven out of nine candidates attend.
- October 10, 2005 - Corinne Côté-Lévesque, the widow of Parti Québécois founder René Lévesque, announces her support for Louis Bernard. She would succumb to cancer only nine days later.
- October 12, 2005 - Gilbert Paquette speaks, in a Le Devoir interview, of the possibility of a common candidacy for the four candidates most to the left, Pierre Dubuc, Jean Ouimet, Jean-Claude St-André and himself, saying that four candidates is too much for the most progressive.
- October 12, 2005 - The third official public debate is held at Trois-Rivières on the subject of "culture".
- October 14, 2005 - The recruiting period is over, midnight of October 14 being the deadline for new members to become party members and have voting rights for the election. The party organization reports a 60% membership rise, from 71,000 to 112,000.
- October 14, 2005 - Former Parti Québécois leader and former Premier of Quebec Bernard Landry states that, if he had heard of André Boisclair taking cocaine while under his government, he would have considered the issue serious and launched an inquiry to decide what to do with the situation.
- October 19, 2005 - A number of public figures publish the manifesto For a clear-eyed vision of Quebec (better known in French as Pour un Québec lucide). It proposes a number of measures like making electricity fees higher to reduce the debt and unfreezing university fees to invest in education. Reactions are mixed. Amongst the Parti Québécois leadership hopeful, André Boisclair agrees on the necessity of debt reduction but not on the university fees issue. Pauline Marois shows herself to be lukewarm. Gilbert Paquette criticizes it harshly at the Quebec City debate.
- October 19, 2005 - The fourth official public debate is held at Quebec City on the subject of "sovereignty and leadership".
- October 21, 2005 - In an interview with La Presse, Jean Ouimet speaks of a probable rally of the most progressive candidates, Pierre Dubuc, Gilbert Paquette, Jean-Claude St-André and himself, behind Pauline Marois to defeat André Boisclair, seen as not enough to the political left. Ouimet states that, out of the frontrunners (usually identified as Louis Bernard, André Boisclair, Richard Legendre and Pauline Marois), Marois embodies to him their values the best.
- October 21, 2005 - At the recording of Larocque-Auger, a political show of the TVA network, Lucien Bouchard reveals that he did not know that André Boisclair had taken cocaine while being a minister under his government.
- October 25, 2005 - In Campaign Rule 1: Be No More Virtuous Than the Voters, The New York Times examines the case of André Boisclair, the Boiclair Affair and the apparent tolerance of the Quebec people, notably with the flaws of their political figures.
- October 25, 2005 - On SRC radio, party heavyweight Louise Beaudoin announces her support for Pauline Marois, citing as a reason for her decision Marois' emphasis on an eventual international offensive, a diplomatic plan to prepare the recognition of an independent Quebec. Beaudoin is a former Parti Québécois Minister of International Relations.
- October 26, 2005 - The fifth official public debate is held at Rimouski on the subject of "territory".
- November 2, 2005 - The sixth official public debate is held at Saguenay on the subject of "education".
- November 2, 2005 - Ghislain Lebel declares that André Boisclair will be his second choice on the ballot.
- November 5, 2005 - Lisette Lapointe, the spouse of former party leader and premier Jacques Parizeau, declares her support for André Boisclair.
- November 8, 2005 - Pierre Dubuc and the SPQ Libre ask their supporters to vote for Pauline Marois as second choice.
- November 9, 2005 - The seventh official public debate is held at Gatineau on the subject of "health".
- November 10, 2005 - Gilbert Paquette withdraws his nomination and asks his supporters to vote for Pauline Marois because of her values that he judges more to the left than those of Boisclair.
- November 12, 2005 - Both André Boisclair and Pauline Marois state their intention to support the final victor of the race.
- November 13, 2005 - Voting by telephone begins at 8 a.m..
- November 15, 2005 - Voting ends at 5 p.m..
- November 15, 2005 - At first round, André Boisclair is declared victor of the election and the new leader of the Parti Québécois with 53.7% of party member votes. At the Quebec City gathering, he delivers a speech calling for party unity and a future referendum on sovereignty.

== Slogans ==
- Louis Bernard - Un homme solide, un Québec solidaire - A solid man, a Quebec of solidarity
- André Boisclair - Ensemble - Together
- Pierre Dubuc - Indépendant, tout est possible - Independent, everything is possible
- Ghislain Lebel - Debout avec vous - Standing with you
- Richard Legendre - En équipe pour le pays! - Teamed-up for the country!
- Pauline Marois - Pour réussir notre indépendance - To succeed with our independence
- Jean Ouimet - Souverains... avec un véritable contrat social - Sovereign... with a true social contract
- Gilbert Paquette - Venez, faisons ensemble du Québec un pays - Come, let us together make of Quebec a country
- Jean-Claude St-André - L'autre façon de faire! - The other way of doing things!

== Results ==
Former Minister André Boisclair was elected leader of the Parti Québécois at the first round ballot. The turnout was around 76% of party members.

Candidate	Votes	Percentage
André Boisclair	56,503	53.7%
Pauline Marois	32,166	30.6%
Richard Legendre	7,877	7.5%
Louis Bernard	5,775	5.5%
Pierre Dubuc	1,282	1.2%
Jean-Claude St-André	951	0.9%
Ghislain Lebel	458	0.4%
Jean Ouimet	247	0.2%
Gilbert Paquette	n/a *	n/a *
Totals	105,259	100%

- Eligible voters: 137,238
- Turnout: 76.69%

*: Gilbert Paquette withdrew and endorsed Pauline Marois on November 10, 2005.
The results are shown as announced by election officials on PQ website.

== See also ==
- 1985 Parti Québécois leadership election
- 2007 Parti Québécois leadership election
- History of Quebec
- Politics of Quebec
- Leadership convention
- Quebec sovereignty movement
