= SPQ =

SPQ may refer to:

- SPQ Libre, Syndicalistes et progressistes pour un Québec libre, Quebec political party
- Ossa SPQ, OSSA Seurat Piron Queyrel, air-cooled 250 cc road racing motorcycle with an OSSA engine and a light frame produced in France in the 1970s.
