= Ouimet =

Ouimet is a surname. Notable people with the surname include:

- Alphonse Ouimet (1908–1988), Canadian television pioneer and president of the Canadian Broadcasting Corporation (CBC)
- David Ouimet, American musician and artist
- Francis Ouimet (1893–1967), American amateur golfer
- François Ouimet (born 1959), Canadian politician
- Gédéon Ouimet (1823–1905), French Canadian politician
- Jean Ouimet (born 1954), Québécois politician and the president of Naviga-Cité, a multimedia company
- Joseph-Aldric Ouimet (1848–1916), Canadian politician from Quenec
- Léo-Ernest Ouimet (1877–1972), Canadian film pioneer
- Matt Ouimet, American chief executive

== See also ==
- Ouimet Canyon, a gorge in northern Ontario, Canada
- Ouimette, a surname
