= Gilles Bellemare =

Gilles Bellemare may refer to:

- Gilles Bellemare (composer) (born 1952), Canadian composer, conductor, and music educator
- Gilles Bellemare (politician) (1932–1980), member of the National Assembly of Quebec
