= Michel Lapierre =

Canadian writer and journalist (1953–2023)

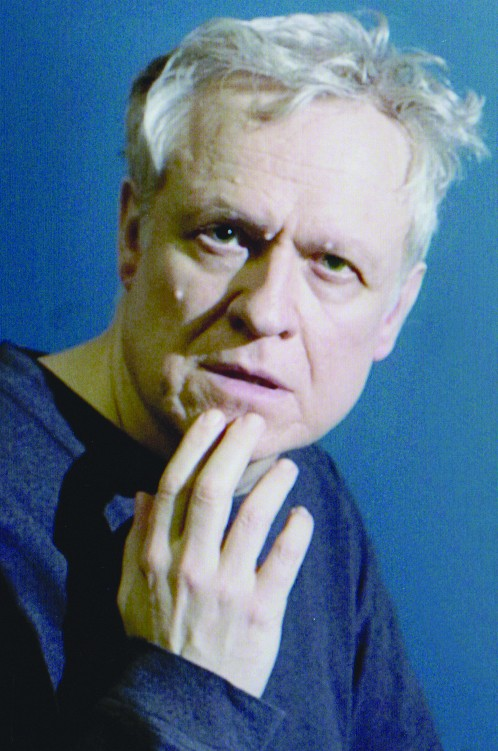
- Lapierre in 2007
- Born: 12 May 1953; Montreal, Quebec, Canada
- Died: 13 October 2023 (aged 70)
- Education: Collège de Maisonneuve; Université de Montréal; McGill University
- Occupations: Writer; Journalist

Michel Lapierre (12 May 1953 – 13 October 2023) was a Canadian writer and journalist.

== Biography ==
Born in Montreal on 12 May 1953, Lapierre studied classical studies at the Collège André-Grasset from 1965 to 1970 and at the Collège des Eudistes from 1970 to 1971. He then studied humanities at the Collège de Maisonneuve from 1974 to 1976. He earned an undergraduate degree in political science from the Université de Montréal in 1979, where he also earned a master's degree in French studies in 1983 and a doctorate in literary history in 1993. During his master's studies, he spent a preparatory year at McGill University in 1981.

In 1998, Lapierre wrote the essay La Vénus québécoise avec ou sans fourrure, which covered female characters in Quebec novels from 1880 through the 20th century. He also wrote L'Autre Histoire du Québec in 2003, an essay on the political and cultural evolution of the Quebec society. He published articles on political thought and cultural issues and contributed to the periodicals L’Apostrophe, L'aut'journal, Ici, and La Presse.

On 1 June 2023, Lapierre was awarded a medal from the Montreal Historical Society. His works were summarized by Victor-Lévy Beaulieu: "because of his intransigence and the talent that one must have when one approaches the words of others and does so without compromise, Lapierre understood that reading is not not a resignation, but a confrontation with the other as well as with oneself".

Michel Lapierre died on 13 October 2023, at the age of 70.
