= Solange Chaput-Rolland =

Canadian journalist, author, lecturer and politician (1919-2001)

The Honourable Solange Chaput-Rolland OC OQ

Senator for Mille Isles, Quebec
- In office 1988–1994
- Appointed by: Brian Mulroney
- Preceded by: Renaude Lapointe
- Succeeded by: Jean-Louis Roux

Member of the National Assembly of Quebec for Prévost
- In office 1979–1981
- Preceded by: Jean-Guy Cardinal
- Succeeded by: Robert Dean

Personal details
- Born: May 14, 1919 Montreal, Quebec
- Died: October 31, 2001 (aged 82) Sainte-Marguerite-Estérel, Quebec
- Party: Progressive Conservative

Solange Chaput-Rolland, OC OQ (May 14, 1919 – October 31, 2001) was a Canadian journalist, author, lecturer, politician, and Senator.

Born in Montreal, the daughter of Émile Chaput and Rosalie Loranger, she received her education from the Couvent d'Outremont, the Sorbonne and the Institut Catholique de Paris. Her brother, Yves Chaput was the husband of Françoise Poliquin, daughter of Jean Poliquin, grandfather of Jean-Nicolas De Surmont.

During the 1950s she worked as a journalist for the CBC with a young Jeanne Sauvé with whom she remained friends until Sauvé's death.

In 1979, she was elected to the National Assembly of Quebec in a by-election in the riding of Prevost. She was defeated in 1981.

She was appointed to the Senate in 1988 representing the senatorial division of Mille Isles, Quebec. She sat as a Progressive Conservative and retired in 1994.

In 1975, she was made an Officer of the Order of Canada. In 1985, she was made an Officer of the National Order of Quebec.

In 1941, she married André Rolland.

== Electoral record ==
Quebec provincial by-election, November 14, 1979: Prévost
Party	Candidate	Votes	%	±%
Liberal	Solange Chaput-Rolland	25,717	63.06	
Parti Québécois	Pierre Harvey	14,433	35.39	
Workers	Richard Lépine	298	0.73	
United Social Credit	Jean-Paul Poulin	257	0.63	
Independent	Marc Blouin	78	0.19	
Total valid votes		40,783	100.00	
Rejected and declined votes		1,145		
Turnout		41,928	77.98	
Electors on the lists		53,771		
Source: Official Results, Government of Quebec

== Selected works ==
- Chers ennemis (1963, with Gwethalyn Graham)
- Mon pays, Québec ou le Canada? (1966)
- Regards 1967: Québec Année Zéro (1968)
- Regards 1968: Une ou deux sociétés justes (1969)
- Regards 1969: La seconde conquête (1970)
- Regards 1970-1971: Les heures sauvages (1972)
- De l'unité à la réalité (1981)
- Le Mystère Québec (1984)
- Et tournons la page... (1989)
- Le Tourment et l'apaisement (1990)
- Léon Dion, hier et demain (1991)
- Chère sénateur (1992)
- Les Élus et les Déçus (1996)
