= Ouimette =

Ouimette is a surname, derived from the surname Ouimet. Notable people with it include:

- Gerard Ouimette (1940–2015), American mobster and author
- Karl Ouimette (born 1992), Canadian professional soccer player
- Stephen Ouimette (born 1954), Canadian actor and director
- Steve Ouimette (born 1968), rock guitarist

== See also ==
- Ouimet, a surname
