= Quebec Avalanche =

- City: Laval, Quebec
- League: National Women's Hockey League
- Division: Eastern
- Founded: 2002
- Folded: 2007
- Home arena: Sainte-Julie Arena
- Colours: Dark blue, grey & white
- Owners: Vinnie Matteo and Andre Savard
- General manager: Vinnie Matteo
- Head coach: Christian Lefebvre
- Captain: Nathalie Dery; Alternate captains: Marie-Eve Cloutier and Caroline Proulx

The Quebec Avalanche was a National Women's Hockey League team (2002 to 2007) located in Laval, Quebec, Canada. Before they were previously known as Sainte-Julie Pantheres (1999–2001) and Metropol Le Cheyenne (2001–2003). Quebec Avalanche has also a children's development program for hockey in Montreal.

== History ==
=== Season-by-season ===
Year by year
Year	GP	W	L	T	GF	GA	Pts
1999–2000	35	20	8	7	109	68	47
2000–01	40	22	15	3	168	102	47
2001–02	30	11	15	4	73	85	26
2002–03	36	10	21	5	87	120	26
2003–04	36	4	30	2	65	163	12
2004–05	36	5	27	4	53	132	16
2005–06	36	4	30	2	58	135	12
2006–07	12	2	8	2	41	91	6

Note: GP = Games played, W = Wins, L = Losses, T = Ties, GF = Goals for, GA = Goals against, Pts = Points.

== Season standings ==
= Indicates First Place finish

= Indicates championship

Year	Regular season	Playoffs
1999–2000	1st, Eastern Division	Finalist, lost the final
2000-01	2nd, Eastern Division	Finalist, lost the final
2001-02	3rd, Eastern Division	no participation in playoff
2002-03	3rd, Eastern Division	no participation in playoff
2003-04	3rd place, Eastern Division	no participation in playoff
2004-05	3rd, Eastern Division	no participation in playoff
2005-06	3rd, Eastern Division	no participation in playoff
2006-07	6th, in one division	no participation in playoff

=== NWHL Championships ===
- 1999-2000: Sainte-Julie Pantheres defeated Laval Le Mistral and Montreal Axion in the first round of playoffs, and faced the Beatrice Aeros for the finals in Brampton, Ontario. In the first game of the Final playoff, the Pantheres came back and tied the game 2-2. In the deciding game, Beatrice Aeros player Cherie Piper scored in the first period. That would prove to be the game-winning goal as Beatrice Aeros claimed the championship by a 1-0 score. Lauren Goldstein earned the shutout for the Aeros. Goaltender Marie-Claude Roy of the Sainte-Julie Pantheres was selected MVP for the Finals. She stopped 80 of 83 shots in the two game series.

March 18: Ste. Julie 2, Beatrice 2
March 19: Beatrice 1, Ste. Julie 0

Beatrice Aeros wins title based on most goals scored.

1999/2000 Coach of Eastern Division All Star Team : Sébastien Gariépy, Ste-Julie Pantheres

- 2000-01: Beatrice Aeros Capture Second NWHL Title: Beatrice wins title based on most goals scored

March 18, 2001: Ste. Julie 2, Beatrice 2
March 19: Beatrice 8, Ste. Julie 1

== Last roster 2006–07 ==
Goalies
Number		Player	Former Team	Hometown
36	(Canada)	Marie-Andree Joncas	Quebec Avalanche 2005-06	Laval, Quebec
30	(Canada)	Ariella Kleiman	Quebec Avalanche 2005-06	Cote-St-Luc, Quebec
N/A	(Canada)	Emmanuelle Cabana	Quebec Avalanche 2005-06	St-Hilaine, Quebec

Defense
Number		Player	Former Team	Hometown
89	(Canada)	Marie-Noel Tessier	Quebec Avalanche 2005-06	Pont Rouge, Quebec
89	(Canada)	Amanda McKay		
88	(Canada)	Audrey Morrisette	Quebec Avalanche 2005-06	
77	(Canada)	Marie-Claude Vaillancourt	Quebec Avalanche 2005-06	LaSalle, Quebec
44	(Canada)	Nathalie Dery	Quebec Avalanche 2005-06	Cap-Sante, Quebec
22	(Canada)	Audrey Seguin	Quebec Avalanche 2005-06	Pointe-Claire, Quebec
19	(Canada)	Sandy Roy	Quebec Avalanche 2005-06	Roxton Falls, Quebec
16	(Canada)	Myriam Boudreau	Quebec Avalanche 2005-06	Iles-de-la-Madeleine, Quebec
12	(Canada)	Julia Carlton	Quebec Avalanche 2005-06	Pointe Claire, Quebec
8	(Canada)	Jessica Bond	Quebec Avalanche 2005-06	
7	(Canada)	Marie-Andree Leclerc-Auger	Quebec Avalanche 2005-06	
7	(Canada)	Carly Hill	Quebec Avalanche 2005-06	Dorval, Quebec
7	(Canada)	Lysanne Desilets	Quebec Avalanche 2005-06	
7	(Canada)	Stephanie Daneau	Quebec Avalanche 2005-06	
7	(Canada)	Valerie Boisclair	Quebec Avalanche 2005-06	

Forwards
Number		Player	Former Team	Hometown
96	(Canada)	Annie Desrosiers		
91	(Canada)	Veronique Laramee-Paquette	Quebec Avalanche 2005-06	Mont-Tremblant, Quebec
89	(Canada)	Sophie Lachapelle	Quebec avalanche 2005-06	Laval, Quebec
88	(Canada)	Martine Leduc	Quebec Avalanche 2005-06	
88	(Canada)	Cynthia Charbonneau	Quebec Avalanche 2005-06	
86	(Canada)	Chloe Cantin	Quebec Avalanche 2005-06	
66	(Canada)	Marie-Eve Cloutier	Quebec Avalanche 2005-06	St-Bruno, Quebec
59	(Canada)	Marie-Eve Pharand	Quebec Avalanche 2005-06	
59	(Canada)	Genevieve Lavoie	Quebec Avalanche 2005-06	
23	(Austria)	Esther Kantor		Austria
21	(Canada)	Veronique Lapierre	Quebec Avalanche 2005-06	Lac-Megantic, Quebec
19	(Canada)	Veronique Lefebvre	Quebec Avalanche 2005-06	
18	(Canada)	Caroline Levesque	Quebec Avalanche 2005-06	Rosemont, Quebec
10	(Canada)	Genevieve Nadeau	Quebec Avalanche 2005-06	Montreal, Quebec
9	(Canada)	Stephanie Lambert	Quebec Avalanche 2005-06	Montreal, Quebec
8	(Canada)	Laurie Tremblay	Quebec Avalanche 2005-06	
8	(Canada)	Pearle Nerenberg	Quebec Avalanche 2005-06	Lachute, Quebec
8	(Canada)	Debbie Beaudoin		White Rock, British Columbia
5	(Canada)	Caroline Proulx	Quebec Avalanche 2005-06	Montreal, Quebec

== Notable former players ==
- Lisa-Marie Breton, forward (2002–03)
- Emilie Castonguay forward
- Nathalie Déry, defenceman
- Nancy Drolet, forward
- (Austria) Esther Kantor, forward
- Caroline Laforge Forward
- Mariève Provost, forward
- Kim St-Pierre, goaltender (2004–05)
- Geneviève St-Pierre goaltender

== Former coaches ==
- Head Coach: Christian Lefebvre ( Sébastien Gariépy in season 1999-2000 for Sainte-Julie Pantheres)
- Goaltending Coach: Marco Marciano

== See also ==
- National Women's Hockey League (1999–2007) (NWHL)
