= Robert Dean (Canadian politician) =

Canadian politician (1927–2021)

Minister of Employment and Consultation of Quebec
- In office 20 December 1984 – 12 December 1985
- Preceded by: position established
- Succeeded by: position abolished

Minister of Revenue of Quebec
- In office 5 March 1984 – 20 December 1984
- Preceded by: Alain Marcoux
- Succeeded by: Maurice Martel

Member of the National Assembly of Quebec for Prévost
- In office 13 April 1981 – 2 December 1985
- Preceded by: Solange Chaput-Rolland
- Succeeded by: Paul-André Forget

Personal details
- Born: 26 October 1927 Montreal, Quebec, Canada
- Died: 4 February 2021 (aged 93)
- Political party: Parti Québécois

Robert Dean (26 October 1927 – 4 February 2021) was a Canadian politician and trade unionist. He was one of the few Anglophone Quebecers to join the Parti Québécois, which advocates for the independence of Quebec from Canada.

== Early life and career ==
Dean was born in Montreal on 26 October 1927. His father, Harry Wilson Dean, was employed at a hotel; his mother was Marie-Anne Grégoire. Dean completed his primary and secondary education in Montreal. He went on to study at Sir George Williams University (an antecedent to Concordia University), obtaining a Bachelor of Arts from that institution in 1963.

Dean started his career working for RCA in Saint-Henri from 1952 until 1959. He was involved in the creation of the CLSC in Saint-Thérèse. He became a trade unionist in 1960, as part of the Canadian Union of Public Employees and United Auto Workers in Drummondville. He was instrumental in creating 24 bargaining units at Hydro-Québec, after the provincial government nationalized electric utility in 1962. He also participated in the strikes against United Aircraft of Canada from 1974 to 1975, one of the most violent periods in Quebec history. From 1969 to 1981, he served as vice president of the Fédération des travailleurs et travailleuses du Québec. He also helped organize unions in Ontario.

== Political career ==
Dean became a member of the Parti Québécois (PQ) in 1969. He was one of the few Anglophone Quebecers to join the separatist party. However, he initially declined to run for politics, after René Lévesque requested that he stand in the 1976 Quebec general election. Dean subsequently ran for the PQ in the 1981 election and was elected to the National Assembly of Quebec as member for the district of Prévost. He sponsored the Act creating the Fonds de solidarité FTQ in June 1983. On 5 March 1984, he joined the Executive Council of Quebec and served as Minister of Revenue. He later became the Minister of Employment and Consultation during a reshuffle on 20 December 1984. He retained that position when Pierre-Marc Johnson became premier on 3 October 1985. However, Dean lost his seat during the 1985 provincial election. He ran again in the election four years later in Groulx but was defeated.

After his defeat in 1985, Dean rejoined the United Auto Workers and retired in 1989.

== Later life ==
After retiring from politics, Dean became a human resources consultant. He was named a member of the Council for the Elderly on 27 June 2001. He joined the SPQ Libre, the left-wing faction of the PQ, when it formed in February 2004. Dean died on 4 February 2021 at the age of 93.
