= Nathalie Déry =

Canadian ice hockey player/coach and teacher

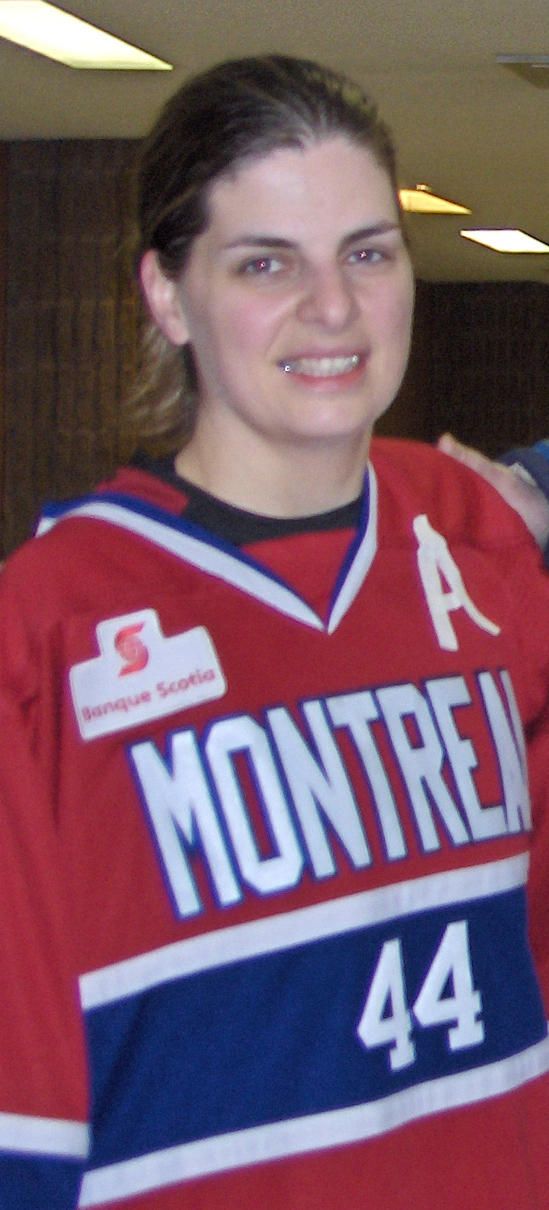
- Born: June 8, 1976 (age 50) Cap-Santé, Quebec, Canada
- Position: Defender
- Played for: Quebec Avalanche; Montreal Axion; Montreal Stars
- Playing career: 1998–2012

Nathalie Déry (born June 8, 1976) is a Canadian ice hockey coach, retired player, and high school teacher. Déry is an assistant coach for Les Canadiennes de Montreal, the team she played for as a defender before retiring in 2012.

== Playing career ==
From 2002 to 2006, Déry played for the Quebec Avalanche of the National Women's Hockey League, and then for the Montreal Axion for the 2006–07 season.

After the NWHL disbanded in 2007, Déry joined for the Montreal Stars of the Canadian Women's Hockey League. With the Stars, she won three Clarkson Cups (2009, 2011, and 2012). She retired from playing in 2012.

== Coaching career ==
For four years, Déry was a coach for the Concordia Stingers women's hockey team.

After retiring from playing for the team in 2012, Déry joined the Montreal Stars as an assistant coach.

== Personal life ==
As of 2012, Déry is a vice-principal and former physical education teacher at École Secondaire de Viau in Montreal.
