= 2007 Parti Québécois leadership election =

- 26 June 2007
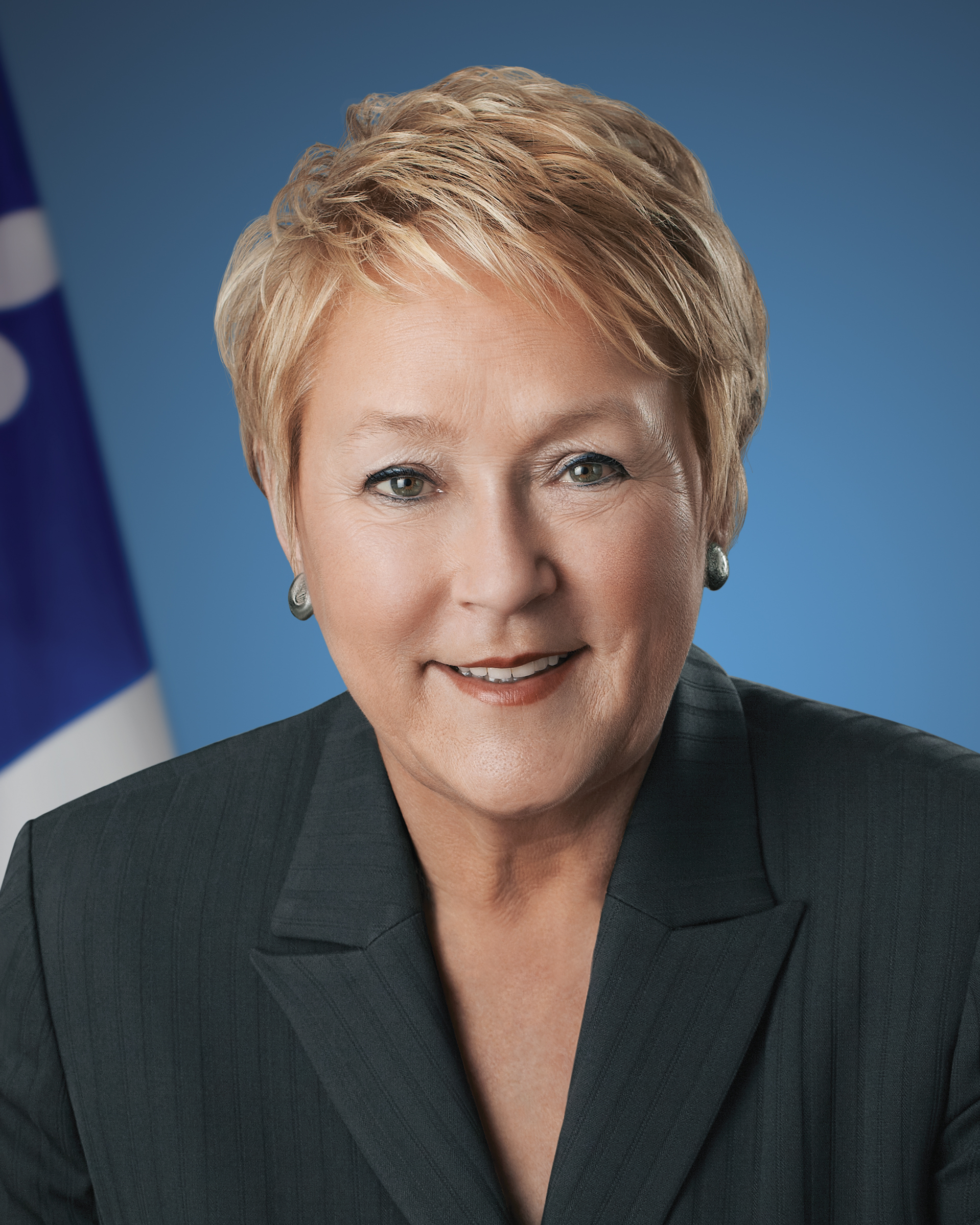
Candidate	Pauline Marois
Party	Parti Québécois
Popular Vote	Acclaimed
Leader before election
André Boisclair
Elected Leader
Pauline Marois

2007 Parti Québécois leadership election
- Date: June 26, 2007
- Resigning leader: André Boisclair
- Won by: Pauline Marois
- Ballots: Acclamation
- Candidates: 1

The Parti Québécois leadership election of 2007 elected the seventh leader of the Parti Québécois, the main political party to promote Quebec independence in Quebec, Canada, and was won by Pauline Marois.

Former PQ Minister Pauline Marois was the first official candidate in the race. Marois ran in both previous PQ leadership races. In a high-profile move after Boisclair's resignation Gilles Duceppe, leader of the Bloc Québécois, had announced his candidacy but withdrew after witnessing sweeping overall support for Marois. Candidates had until June 26, 2007 to officially declare; no other candidate did so and Marois was acclaimed.

== Unfolding ==
=== Background ===
The race was launched by the resignation of leader André Boisclair on May 8, 2007. After another emotional leader's departure, that of Bernard Landry, Boisclair was elected on November 15, 2005 with a majority of 53.7% on the first voting round. At that time, the governing party in Quebec City was dealing with unparalleled unpopularity under neoliberal Jean Charest's Liberal Party, the Sponsorship Scandal was badly hurting the Liberal federal government's standing and support for Quebec independence was at record highs.

However, as the election date limit approached, Boisclair's popularity waned, a Conservative federal government claiming to be more conciliatory was elected (and made in-roads in Quebec after more than a decade of drought), the Liberal Party of Quebec gained back support by moving back towards the center and the Action démocratique du Québec rapidly gained popularity (as it had in 2002, only to lose it the year after), notably on the reasonable accommodation controversy. Boisclair impressed most analysts and PQ followers during the election campaign but, on March 26, 2007, the PQ was nonetheless sent back to a third party status at the National Assembly as the third party in number of seats.

Opposition to Boisclair, already present before the election campaign, grew within his party. On May 4, at an interview taping of the SRC television programme Les coulisses du pouvoir, Boisclair claimed to believe in an attempt from Gilles Duceppe's entourage to unseat him so Duceppe can become the PQ leader. This event created a sizable amount of criticism from within the sovereigntist movement and prompted a surprised Duceppe to deny the allegations. Boisclair finally resigned on May 8, 2007. Despite the historical blow for the PQ to its representation in the National Assembly, independence retains a stable support around 45%.

=== Race ===
The race was launched at a time when finances for the party were relatively tight. On 11 May 2007, Gilles Duceppe issued a press release announcing his candidacy and Pauline Marois announced her own to the press minutes later. Pierre Curzi, an actor and former Union des artistes president, was a third name often mentioned by the media for a possible candidacy.

Just 24 hours after his candidacy announcement, Gilles Duceppe chose to withdraw from the race. His decision ensued from the sweeping popular support for Pauline Marois, as described in a CROP poll on La Presse's front-page the day after the announcement. In the poll, 45% of the respondents had chosen Marois and only 21% were for Duceppe. A number of key Parti québécois MNAs also chose to support the former minister, thereby reducing Duceppe's chances. In a communique Duceppe declared he wanted to "avoid a duel which could divide and therefore weaken the sovereigntist movement".

== Candidates ==
Official

- Pauline Marois: Entered the race on May 11, 2007 and became an official candidate on June 18, 2007. Supports: MNA Bernard Drainville (May 9), MNA Marie Malavoy (May 11), MNA Danielle Doyer (May 11), MNA Denis Trottier (May 11), MP Christiane Gagnon (May 11), MP Réal Ménard (May 11), former PQ regional association president for Quebec City Philippe-Edwin Bélanger (May 11).

Withdrew

- Gilles Duceppe: Entered the race on 11 May 2007, but withdrew 24 hours later after witnessing a wave of popular support for Pauline Marois. Duceppe threw his support to Marois and voiced a wish to remain leader of the Bloc in Ottawa.

Speculated

- Pierre Curzi
- Joseph Facal
- Diane Lemieux

Declined

- Bernard Drainville: Threw his support for Pauline Marois' candidacy the day after Boisclair's departure, before Marois officially entered the race.
- Bernard Landry: Promptly confirmed after the resignation of Boisclair that he had no intention of running.

== Polls ==
Opinion polls during the campaign
Firm/Client	Date	Pierre Curzi	Bernard Drainville	Gilles Duceppe	Joseph Facal	Bernard Landry	Diane Lemieux	Pauline Marois
TVA-Léger Marketing ^{1, 2}	8 May 2007	10%	3%	17%	—	7%	2%	28%
CROP-La Presse ^{1, 2}	12 May 2007	8%	3%	21%	4%	—	2%	45%
Notes^{1} Poll occurred after André Boisclair's resignation but before any candidates had announced their intention to run. ² Both PQ and non-PQ voters were polled.

== Timeline ==
- March 26, 2007: The Parti Québécois is third in number of seats at the Quebec general elections.
- May 3, 2007: Former PQ Minister Denis Lazure addresses an open letter to leader André Boisclair in Le Devoir calling for his resignation.
- May 4, 2007: At an interview taping of the SRC political programme Les coulisses du pouvoir, André Boisclair claims to believe in an attempt to unseat him by Gilles Duceppe's entourage, so Duceppe can talk the helm of the PQ. Criticism from within the sovereigntist movement follows.
- May 8, 2007: Leader André Boisclair resigns.
- May 9, 2007: Bernard Drainville announces his support for Pauline Marois
- May 11, 2007: Gilles Duceppe announces that he will run in the race. Minutes later, Pauline Marois declares the same.
- May 11, 2007: Pro-independence newspaper Le Québécois issues a press release stating that they would support neither Duceppe nor Marois, calling for a candidate without a "history of provincialist administration".
- May 12, 2007: Gilles Duceppe announces his withdrawal from the race and throws his support to Pauline Marois.
- June 26, 2007: Marois is acclaimed PQ leader.

== See also ==
- 1985 Parti Québécois leadership election
- 2005 Parti Québécois leadership election
- History of Quebec
- Politics of Quebec
- Leadership convention
- Quebec sovereignty movement
