= Léon Mugesera =

Rwandan genocidaire (born 1952)

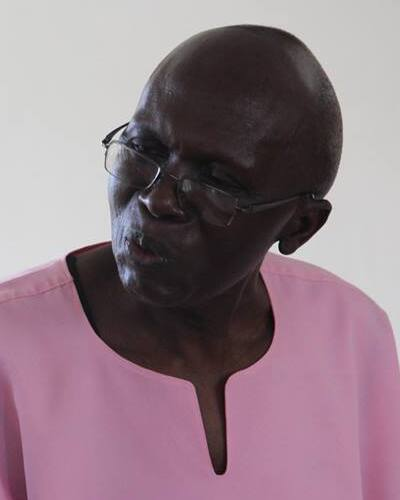
- Mugesara, date unknown
- Born: 1952 (age 73–74); Gisenyi, Belgian Rwanda
- Education: Quebec University
- Political party: MRND
- Spouse: Gemma Uwamariya
- Conviction: Incitement to genocide

Details
- Imprisoned at: Mpanga International Prison

Léon Mugesera (born 1952) is a convicted genocidaire from Rwanda who took residence in Quebec, Canada. He was deported from Canada for an inflammatory anti-Tutsi speech which his critics allege was a precursor to the 1994 Rwandan genocide. In 2016, he was convicted of incitement to genocide and sentenced to life in prison.

== Time in Rwanda ==
An ethnic Hutu, Mugesera has been a member of the dominant Hutu MRND party, which had close ties to the military. He was MRND Vice-Chairman for Gisenyi prefecture.

In February 1991, Mugesera authored a pamphlet accusing Tutsi of plotting to "exterminate the Hutu majority". In a speech given on November 22, 1992 in Rwanda, Mugesera allegedly told 1000 party members that "we the people are obliged to take responsibility ourselves and wipe out this scum" and that they should kill Tutsis and "dump their bodies into the rivers of Rwanda."

Do not be afraid, know that anyone whose neck you do not cut is the one who will cut your neck.

— Léon Mugesera on 22 November 1992, translation in official document 'Dockets: A-316-01 A-317-01', 2003

Following this speech, Rwandan minister of justice, Stanislas Mbonampeka, issued an arrest warrant against him for inciting hatred. He fled with his family first to the Rwandan army and then to Quebec City in Quebec, Canada. Shortly afterwards, Mbonampeka resigned as minister of justice in protest.

== Canada ==
In Canada, Mugesera and his family arrived as refugees, but were quickly granted permanent resident status. Mugesera secured a job teaching at Université Laval.

== Accusation of war-crimes ==
Philip Gourevitch, author of We Wish to Inform You That Tomorrow We Will Be Killed with Our Families, claims that Mugesera's 1992 speech gave necessary momentum to the anti-Tutsi hysteria that led to the genocide, saying that "[Mugesera] was one of the first to go in a major public speech and say, 'Look, our mistake in the past with the Tutsi minority has been allowing them to survive, has been allowing them to live. We must get rid of them.'"

== Deportation process ==
In 1995, Canadian government lawyers began deportation hearings against Mugesera. Two immigration tribunals ordered his deportation, however, the Canadian Federal Court of Appeal overturned these verdicts. Justice Robert Décary, writing for the Court, held that there was no evidence linking the 1992 speech with the genocide which occurred two years later. In all cases Mugesera was represented by Quebec lawyer Guy Bertrand.

On August 1, 2001, Mugesera issued a statement, requesting a trial under Canada's new Crimes Against Humanity and War Crimes Act.

The decision of the Federal Court of Appeal was later overturned by an 8–0 decision of the Supreme Court of Canada on June 28, 2005, which upheld the original deportation order. The deportation was delayed because of concerns about the possible use of the death penalty in Rwanda, Rwanda abolished their death penalty in 2007. Mugesera then began fighting his deportation on the basis of fears he would be tortured in Rwanda. As Canada would be reluctant to deport someone who could face torture, Kigali offered Canada "diplomatic guarantees" about the treatment of Mugesera.

On January 23, 2012, a Quebec Superior Court judge rejected Léon Mugesera's bid to avoid deportation. Mugesera was deported via Montreal's international airport the same day by 4 PM.

On April 15, 2016, Mugesera was convicted of incitement to genocide and inciting ethnic hatred and sentenced to life in prison by a Rwandan court.

== Appeal ==
On September 25, 2020, Rwanda's Court of Appeal in Kigali ruled against Mugesera's claim that his life sentence should be set aside. He contended that his trial had been unfair and that the conditions of his imprisonment were inhumane. Mugesera's request for a retrial was denied. The Court panel rejected his claim that the recordings which were the basis of his incitement conviction were not authentic.

== African Court on Human and Peoples' Rights ==
From 2017 to 2020 the African Court on Human and Peoples' Rights deliberated over several charges brought by Mugesera. In 2016, Rwanda's government had filed a declaration that it would no longer allow individual complaints to be heard by the African court. The court held that such declarations would only be effective after one year. Since Mugesera's complaint was filed within the year, it was held admissible, but Rwanda's government chose not to take part in the deliberations. Although the court rejected some of Mugesera's allegations (e.g. inadequate counsel) it accepted others (inhumane jail conditions, inadequate medical care).

== See also ==
- Protais Zigiranyirazo
- African Charter on Human and Peoples' Rights
