= SPQ Libre =

Headline of the official Syndicalistes et progressistes pour un Québec libre political club website.

The SPQ Libre ! or Syndicalistes et progressistes pour un Québec libre ! (spelled with or without the exclamation mark) is a political club that, until March 2010, operated within the Parti Québécois. Its president is former labour union leader Marc Laviolette.

== History ==
The movement finds its roots in the desire of many progressive Quebec sovereigntists to bring back disillusioned left-wing militants and voters to the Parti Québécois, an established party for independence and social democracy, instead of creating a spoiler effect with third parties. Notable initiators of its birth are former Centrale des syndicats du Québec union president Monique Richard, former Confédération des syndicats nationaux union president Marc Laviolette (the current SPQ Libre president), former president of the feminist Fédération des femmes du Québec and future BQ Member of Parliament Vivian Barbot, and former Parti Québécois minister Robert Dean.

Opening the Parti Québécois to the concept of political clubs was first approved by then party leader Bernard Landry himself, convinced by left-wing activists. The party ratified this new possibility during the Parti Québécois National Council of 2005. This made it possible for the SPQ Libre to become a political club within the structure of the party.

Monique Richard, having become the SPQ Libre spokeswoman, was elected president of the Parti Québécois at the 2005 National Council, something seen by the SPQ Libre as a left-wing victory in the PQ. It declared its intent to field a sharply progressive candidate for the Parti Québécois leadership election of 2005, who ended up being editor of L'aut'journal and Secretary of the SPQ Libre Pierre Dubuc.

After continued criticism of Pauline Marois perceived shift to the right on certain policy issues, the PQ expelled the group in March 2010, saying the attacks on Marois leadership and policies were "undermining party unity".

=== Identity question ===
After the PQ's defeat in 2007, factions of the SPQ criticized the party leadership for allowing the "identity question" and defense of "Québécois de souche" to be led by the Action démocratique du Québec.

== Description ==
The SPQ Libre is explicitly left-wing, pro labour unions and in favour of Quebec independence and determined enough to achieve it. Being a political club with the intent of assuring a strong left-wing presence in a party and to influence it, its nature is notably reminiscent of the New Democratic Party's New Politics Initiative or, to a lesser extent, of the New Democratic Party Socialist Caucus.

Its creation represents in many ways a response to the creation of the Union des forces progressistes (and Option citoyenne), as well as to the discontent of some militants of the PQ leftist faction. Thus, a goal of the SPQ Libre is to demonstrate that stronger leftists have their place in the Parti Québécois, portrayed by the SPQ Libre as the only party able to achieve sovereignty.

== See also ==
- Parti Québécois
- Political faction
- Quebec politics
- Quebec sovereignty movement
