= 1985 Parti Québécois leadership election =

- 29 September 1985
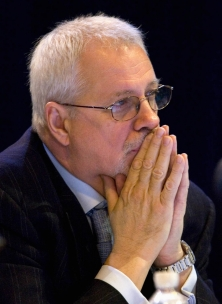

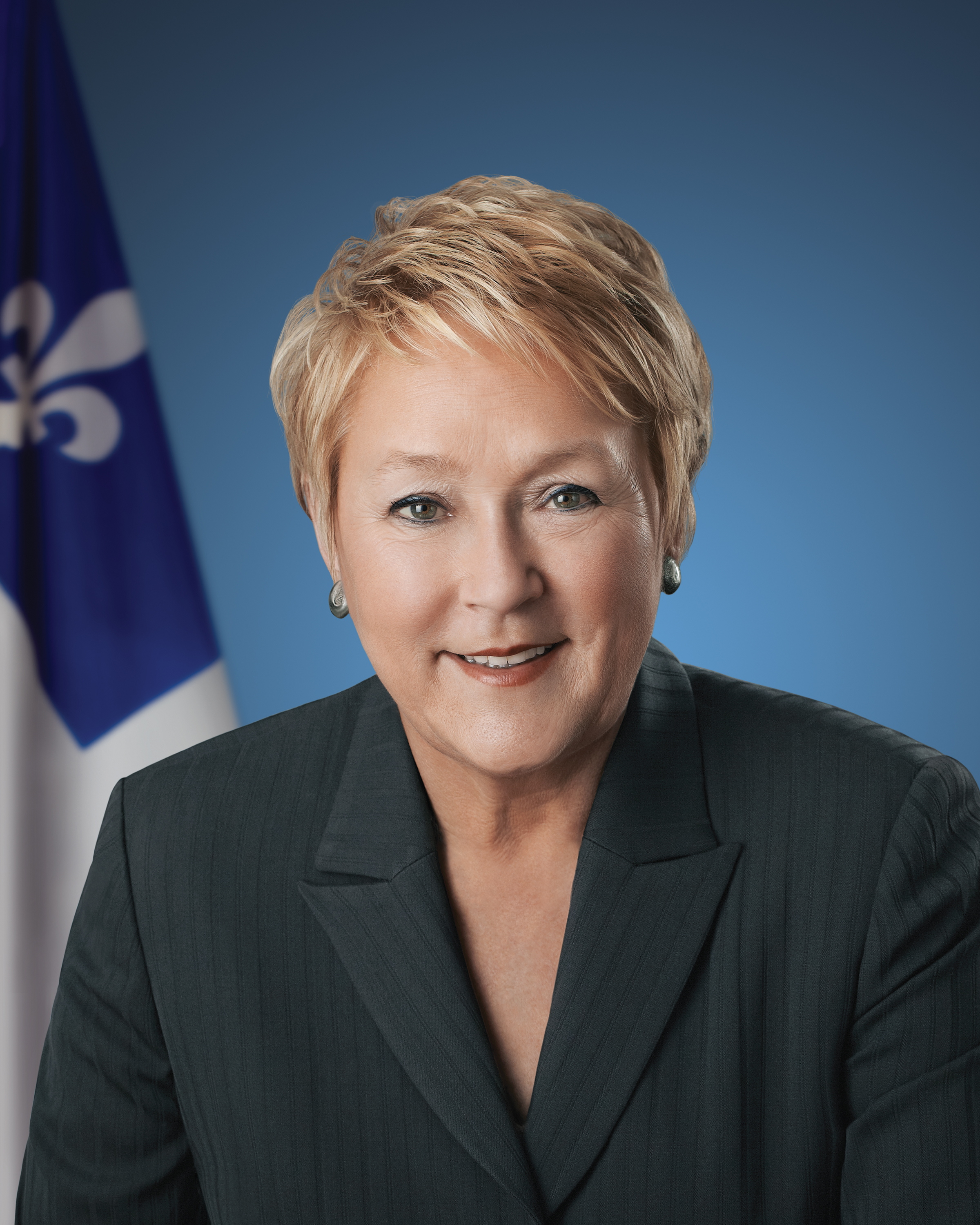

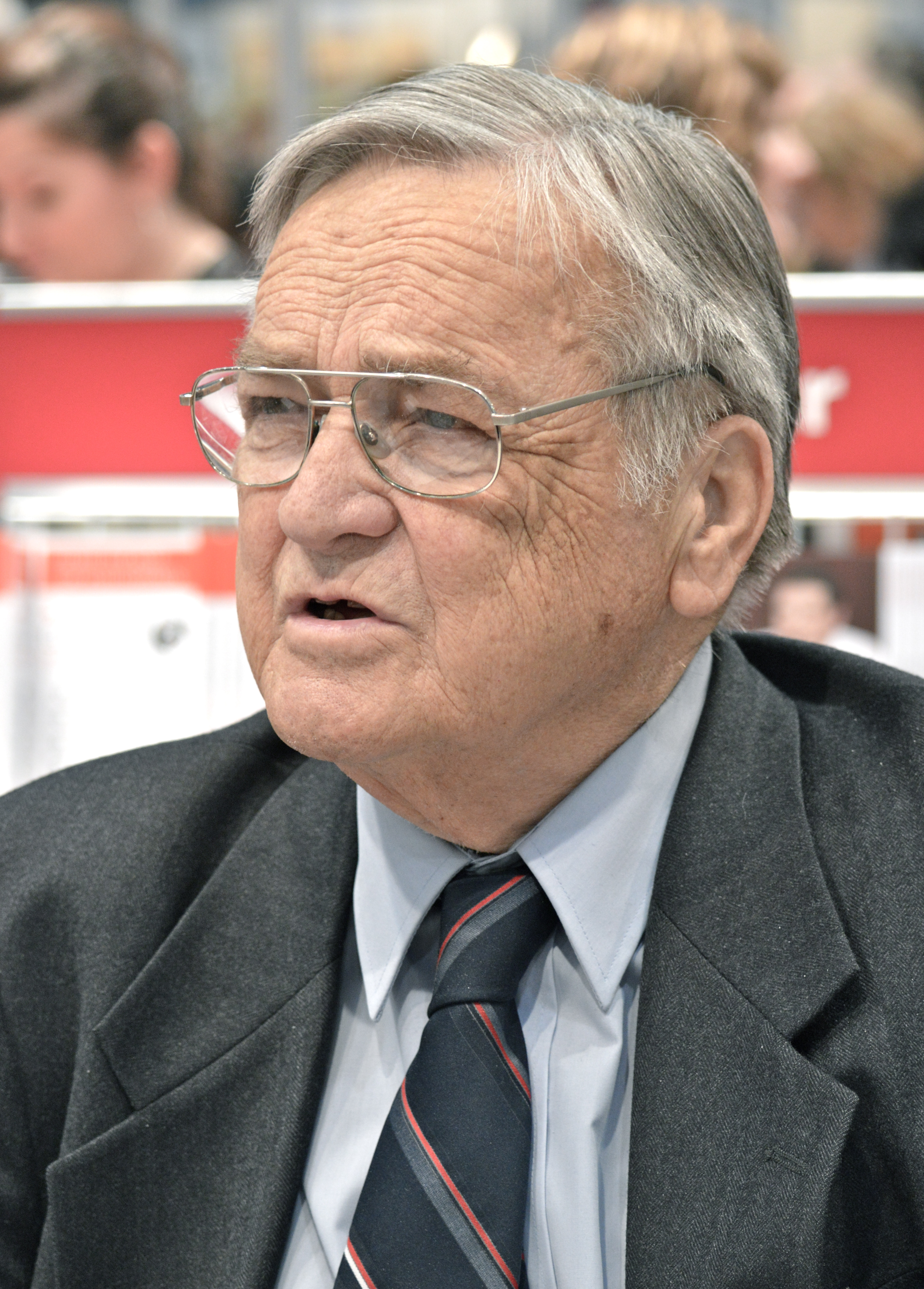
Candidate	Pierre-Marc Johnson	Pauline Marois	Jean Garon
Votes	56,925	19,471	15,730
Percentage	58.7%	19.7%	16.2%
Leader before election
René Lévesque
Elected Leader
Pierre-Marc Johnson

1985 Parti Québécois leadership election
- Date: September 29, 1985
- Resigning leader: René Lévesque
- Won by: Pierre-Marc Johnson
- Ballots: 1
- Candidates: 6

The Parti Québécois leadership election of 1985 was held to elect a new leader of the Parti Québécois, the main sovereigntist and social democratic political party in Quebec, Canada. It elected Pierre-Marc Johnson at the helm of the party. It was conducted under the one member, one vote universal suffrage system, making the Parti Québécois the first political party to do so in Quebec history. It was the first race of its kind in the history of the party, created in 1968, and would be followed by the leadership election of 2005.

== History ==
The election was caused by the departure of founder René Lévesque, and was conducted while the party was in power. With Pierre-Marc Johnson elected, he would assume premiership from October to December 1985. Johnson afterwards played the role of Leader of the Opposition until 1987.

The election finds its historical importance in the fact that, in the first era of said "Post-Referendum Syndrome", the election of Pierre-Marc Johnson secured the party's past decision of putting the independence project, the first raison d'être of the PQ, on the back burner. This decision had caused a crisis within party ranks, which was influential in the departure of René Lévesque. This party stance of affirmation nationale (Johnson's approach of nationalism without actively pursuing the objective of sovereignty) would last until the ousting of Johnson and the arrival of Jacques Parizeau as leader in 1988.

It was the first attempt of Pauline Marois for the leadership, one that she would repeat at the leadership election of 2005. Bernard Landry, future leader from 2001 to 2005, also entered the race of 1985, only to drop out midway. During his campaign, Landry had presented himself as a "sovereigntist and progressive" candidate and, during his campaign, given signs that, if elected leader, he could rescind the party decision of putting sovereignty on hold. Guy Bertrand's campaign tended to represent the sovereigntist pur et dur stream of the party, clashing with his later ideological shift.

== Candidates ==
- Guy Bertrand
- Luc Gagnon
- Jean Garon
- Pierre-Marc Johnson
- Francine Lalonde
- Bernard Landry (withdrew)
- Pauline Marois

== Results ==
Candidate	Votes	Percentage
Pierre-Marc Johnson	56,925	58.7%
Pauline Marois	19,471	19.7%
Jean Garon	15,730	16.2%
Guy Bertrand	2,733	2.8%
Francine Lalonde	1,484	1.5%
Luc Gagnon	1,046	1.1%
Totals	96,974*	100.0%

First ballot
Johnson	58.70%
Marois	19.66%
Garon	16.22%
Bertrand	2.81%
Lalonde	1.53%
Gagnon	1.08%

== See also ==
- 2005 Parti Québécois leadership election
- 2007 Parti Québécois leadership election
- History of Quebec
- Politics of Quebec
- Quebec sovereignty movement
