= Gilles Hébert =

Canadian artist

Gilles Hébert has been a Canadian artist since his retirement from roles as the director of numerous art institutions.

== Early life and education ==
Born in St. Boniface, Manitoba, Hebert received his Bachelor of Arts degree from the University of Manitoba.

== Career ==
Hebert has worked extensively across Canada, particularly in the Western provinces of the country. As a previous director of the Mendel Art Gallery in Saskatoon, Saskatchewan, Hebert worked with Joni Mitchell in curating a critically acclaimed retrospective show of Mitchell's art work which attracted an average of 1,000 people per day, doubling attendance. In October 2009, he left his position as Director of the Art Gallery of Windsor in Ontario to assume the role of Chief Executive Officer of the Art Gallery of Alberta. After that, he held an executive position for the Canadian Museum for Human Rights.

He co-owns the arts consulting firm Arena Cultural Planning Group.
