= Pierre Dubuc =

Pierre Dubuc (born Jean-Pierre Dubuc May 25, 1947 in Montreal, Quebec) is the director and editor of L'aut'journal, a progressive monthly paper. He is one of the founders of SPQ Libre, a left-wing political club within the Parti Québécois.

== Biography ==
Pierre Dubuc completed studies in political science at the Université de Montréal. He eventually became active within the Marxist-Leninist movement En lutte!. He departed the group later in the 1970s, finding it not enough to the left, to join the Union bolchévique. Dubuc founded in 1984, the monthly paper called L'aut'journal, of which he is now director and editor. In 1996, he contributed to the creation of the Chaire d'études socio-économiques de l'UQÀM, which he directed for two years.

He joined the Parti Québécois in 2004 when the pro-union, progressive SPQ Libre was founded, with his assistance. He declared on July 20, 2005 his intention to enter the Parti Québécois leadership election of 2005 in the name of the SPQ Libre. His candidacy was approved unanimously by the SPQ Libre on August 15, 2005, and confirmed by the Parti Québécois on September 9, 2005. He won 1,282 votes or 1.2% of the ballots cast.

== Bibliography ==
- L'autre histoire de l’indépendance, Éditions Trois-Pistoles, 2003.
- Manifeste du SPQ Libre, Éditions Trois-Pistoles, 2005.
- Larose n’est pas Larousse, Éditions Trois-Pistoles, 2003, with Charles Castonguay, Jean-Claude Germain et Victor-Lévy Beaulieu.

== See also ==
- L'aut'journal
- SPQ Libre
- Quebec sovereignty movement
- Parti Québécois
- 2005 Parti Québécois leadership election
