= Louis Bernard =

Québécois politician

Louis Bernard, OQ (born 27 July 1937) is a Canadian politician and former public servant from Quebec.

== Biography ==
Louis Bernard is a former Chief of Staff to Parti Québécois Premier René Lévesque and former Secretary general of the Government to Parti Québécois Premiers Réne Lévesque and Jacques Parizeau. He entered the Parti Québécois leadership election in 2005 and placed fourth with 5.5% of the vote which was won on the first ballot by André Boisclair.

== See also ==
- 2005 Parti Québécois leadership election
- Quebec sovereignty movement
