= Guy Bertrand (lawyer) =

Canadian lawyer

Guy Bertrand is a lawyer operating in Quebec City. He is a founding member of the Parti Québécois and ran in the PQ leadership election of 1985. He had been a Quebec sovereigntist of the pur et dur stream for most of his public life, before shifting to the opposite Quebec federalist ideology during the 1990s. He converted back to sovereigntism during the 2000s. He is also the author of Enough is enough! (translation of the French Plaidoyer pour les citoyens 'Representing citizens'), where he criticizes the destructive and dishonest tactics of the Quebec separatist movement, but indicates continued support for their ideals.

He defended Léon Mugesera, well publicized anti-Tutsi speaker of the 1994 Rwandan genocide, and faced accusations from the Barreau du Québec for remarks he made during the Mugasera trial. He accused the Canadian government and the Supreme Court of Canada of giving in to pressure from Jewish organizations, which he claimed wanted Mugasera deported.

In 2006 Bertrand made a case for Quebec to have its own team in the upcoming 2008 Men's World Ice Hockey Championships being held partly in Quebec City. However, Quebec is not a member of the IIHF and even if admitted, would need to work their way up to the "A" Pool of the World Championship from the lowest division. The idea has also not garnered much support among Quebec hockey stars. Top forward Vincent Lecavalier has publicly opposed the idea.

In October 2007, Bertrand told a provincial commission on reasonable accommodation for cultural minorities that French is threatened by language accommodations. He also claimed that English and multiculturalism in Montreal are undermining French, and that newcomers must acculturate into the majority. Commission co-chairman Charles Taylor reminded Bertrand the commission is about religious accommodations for minorities and not linguistic ones.

Bertrand criticized Montreal Canadiens captain Saku Koivu for not being able to speak French, despite having lived in Quebec for quite some time. Bertrand said it "demonstrates contempt for it".

In 2014, three years after having launched his work Liberté-Nation Bertrand recidivated with a documentary in which he proposes his "business plan" to realize the independence of Quebec.

Bertrand, who believes that the initiative of independence must come from the regions, proposes the creation of a federal republic of Quebec in which the 17 regions would exercise the status of autonomous states, but united.

Bertrand believes that such a structure would allow making the Québécois 'nation' a free, modern and prosperous one.

== See also ==
- 1985 Parti Québécois leadership election
- Quebec politics
- Quebec sovereignty movement
- Quebec federalist ideology
