= Alexandre Castonguay =

Canadian artist (born 1968)

- Born: 1968 (age 57–58); Hull, Quebec
- Known for: Media artist

Alexandre Castonguay RCA (born 1968) is a Canadian media artist. He is known for his use of electronic and open-source technologies in his artworks.

== Career ==
In 2005, Castonguay had a solo exhibition of his work at Musée d'art contemporain de Montréal. In 2009, his work was included in the Biennale de Montreal. He is a member of the Royal Canadian Academy of Arts. He is a professor at UQAM.

== Collections ==
Castonguay's work is included in several major museum collections, including the Los Angeles County Museum of Art, the Musée national des beaux-arts du Québec, the Montreal Museum of Fine Arts and the National Gallery of Canada.
