= Gilles Bellemare (politician) =

Canadian politician

Gilles Bellemare (born 22 November 1932, Shawinigan, Mauricie – 15 August 1980) was a Canadian politician from Quebec.

He ran as a Liberal candidate in 1973 for the district of Rosemont and won with 51% of the vote. He was defeated in 1976 with 33% of the vote. He was succeeded by Parti Québécois candidate Gilbert Paquette.

== Footnotes ==
National Assembly of Quebec
Preceded by District created in 1972	MNA for Rosemont; 1973–1976	Succeeded by Gilbert Paquette (Parti Québécois)
