= Charles Castonguay =

Canadian mathematician

- Born: 1940; Ottawa, Ontario
- Occupation(s): Professor of mathematics and statistics, researcher in language demographics

Charles Castonguay (born 1940) is a retired associate professor of Mathematics and Statistics at the University of Ottawa.

== Biography ==
A native English speaker, Castonguay was sent by his parents to a French Catholic primary school. He took his first English courses in high school. Enrolled in the Canadian Armed Forces to pursue university-level studies, he obtained a masters of mathematics from the University of Ottawa. During the three years of his military service, he was posted to National Defence headquarters in Ottawa as counsellor in mathematics and also taught young officers at the Collège militaire royal de Saint-Jean.

After his service, he began teaching mathematics and statistics at the University of Ottawa and registered at McGill University to study the philosophy of mathematics and epistemology. The subject of his doctoral thesis was "meaning" and "existence" in mathematics. He obtained his Ph.D. in 1971. The thesis was published in 1972 and 1973.

In 1970, he attended a meeting of the Parti Québécois in the Laurier riding. René Lévesque was the speaker at this meeting, designed to inform English speakers of the party's Sovereignty-Association project. After that experience, he campaigned for the party until the election of 1976.

Partly to understand himself as a francized English speaker, he took great interest in the analysis of the linguistic behaviours of populations and language policies. He became a specialist on the subject of language shifts and completed several studies on behalf of the Office québécois de la langue française.

On January 25, 2001, he took an active part in a symposium held by the commission of the Estates-General on the Situation and Future of the French Language in Quebec (Les enjeux démographiques et l'intégration des immigrants). Thereafter, he co-authored a book criticizing its final report.

Since 2000, he contributes to the Dossier linguistique in the newspaper L'aut'journal. He participated in the foundation of the Institut de recherche sur le français en Amérique in 2008.

== Works ==
=== In English ===
Thesis

- Meaning and Existence in Mathematics, New York: Springer-Verlag, 1972, 159 pages (also New York: Springer, 1973)

Articles

- "Nation Building and Anglicization in Canada's Capital Region", in Inroads Journal, Issue 11, 2002, pp. 71–86
- "French is on the ropes. Why won’t Ottawa admit it ?", in Policy Options, volume 20, issue 8, 1999, pp. 39–50
- "Getting the facts straight on French : Reflections following the 1996 Census", in Inroads Journal, Issue 8, 1999, pages 57 to 77
- "The Fading Canadian Duality", in Language in Canada (ed. John R. Edwards), pp. 36–60, Cambridge: Cambridge University Press, 1998, 520 pages
- "Assimilation Trends among Official-Language Minorities. 1971-1991", in Towards the Twenty-First Century: Emerging Socio-Demographic Trends and Policy Issues in Canada, pp. 201–205, Federation of Canadian Demographers, Ottawa, 1996
- "The Anglicization of Canada, 1971-1981", in Language Problems and Language Planning, vol. 11, issue 1, Spring 1987
- "Intermarriage and Language Shift in Canada, 1971 and 1976", in Canadian Journal of Sociology, Vol. 7, No. 3 (Summer, 1982), pp. 263–277
- "The Economic Context of Bilingualism and Language Transfer in the Montreal Metropolitan Area", in The Canadian Journal of Economics, Vol. 12, No. 3 (Aug., 1979), pp. 468–479 (with Calvin J. Veltman, Jac-Andre Boulet)
- "Why Hide the Facts? The Federalist Approach to the Language Crisis in Canada", in Canadian Public Policy, 1979
- "Opportunities for the Study of Language Transfer in the 1971 Census", in Paul Lamy (ed.), Language Maintenance and Language Shift in Canada: New Dimensions in the Use of Census Language Data, Ottawa: Ottawa University Press, 1977, p. 63-73.
- "An Analysis of the Canadian Bilingual Districts Policy", in American Review of Canadian Studies, 1976

Other

- Transcript of a Standing Joint Committee on Official Languages hearing, recorded on April 28, 1998

=== In French ===
Studies

- Incidence du sous-dénombrement et des changements apportés aux questions de recensement sur l'évolution de la composition linguistique de la population du Québec entre 1991 et 2001 (Étude 3), Montréal: Office québécois de la langue française, September 26, 2005, 29 pages
- Les indicateurs généraux de vitalité des langues au Québec : comparabilité et tendances 1971-2001 (Étude 1), Montréal : Office québécois de la langue française, May 26, 2005, 48 pages
- La langue parlée au foyer : signification pour l'avenir du français et tendances récentes, Oral presentation given to a symposium held by the commission of the Estates-General on the Situation and Future of the French Language in Quebec, January 25, 2001
- L'indicateur de développement humain de l'ONU : le concept et son usage, Sainte-Foy: Publications du Québec, 1995, 68 pages
- L'assimilation linguistique : mesure et évolution 1971-1986, Québec: Conseil de la langue française, 1994, 243 pages
- Exogamie et anglicisation dans les régions de Montréal, Hull, Ottawa et Sudbury, Québec: Centre international de recherche sur le bilinguisme, 1981
