= Gilbert Paquette =

Canadian politician

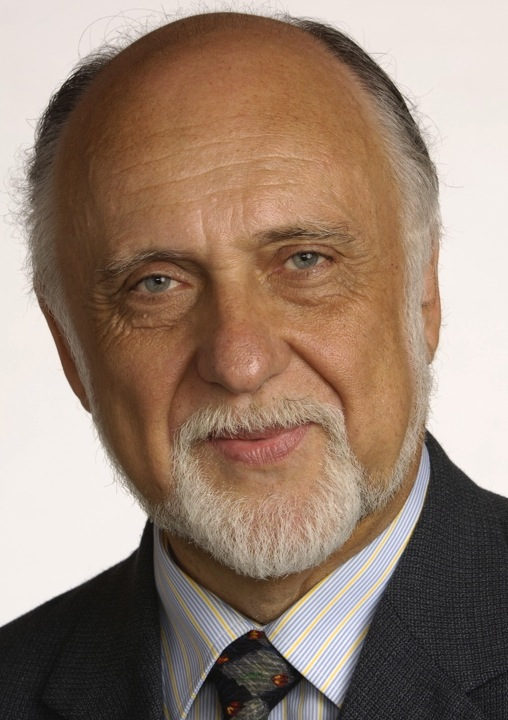

Member of the National Assembly of Quebec for Rosemont
- In office November 15, 1976 – December 2, 1985
- Preceded by: Gilles Bellemare
- Succeeded by: Guy Rivard

Personal details
- Born: October 19, 1942 (age 83) Montreal, Quebec, Canada
- Party: Bloc Québecois (federal); Parti Québecois (provincial)
- Education: University of Maine
- Occupation: University professor, researcher, politician

Gilbert Paquette (born October 19, 1942) is a Canadian university professor, businessman, researcher and politician. Paquette is a researcher at the Centre interuniversitaire de recherche sur le téléapprentissage (CIRTA-LICEF), which he founded in 1992. He was National Assembly of Quebec member for the riding of Rosemont from 1976 to 1985 under the Parti Québécois banner and in the final months of his second term as an Independent MNA.

== Profile ==
Gilbert Paquette is a professor at UQAM. He holds a master's degree in computer science and mathematics and a doctorate from the University of Maine in artificial intelligence and education. He holds a Canada Research Chair. He was the scientific director of the LORNET network, arguably the largest Canadian Semantic Web initiative. LORNET ran in the period 2003–2008.

He has been the keynote speaker at several international conferences and he is on the board of five journals. Paquette has also founded two companies, Micro-Intel (1987–1991) and Cogigraph (1999–2004).

Paquette was Minister of Sciences and Technology from 1982 to 1984 in the Parti Québécois government of René Lévesque, but left the party in the last few months of his term. He made a comeback on the political scene in 2005 when he joined the Parti Québécois leadership election to succeed Bernard Landry. On November 10, 2005, he withdrew from the race and asked his supporters to vote for Pauline Marois.

In the 2015 Canadian federal election, he ran for the Bloc Québécois in the riding of LaSalle—Émard—Verdun, finishing third.

== See also ==
- Parti Québécois Crisis, 1984
- 2005 Parti Québécois leadership election
- Parti Québécois
- Quebec sovereignty movement
- Politics of Quebec

== Electoral record (partial) ==
2015 Canadian federal election: LaSalle—Émard—Verdun
Party	Candidate	Votes	%	±%	Expenditures
Liberal	David Lametti	23,603	43.90	+25.61	$93,016.24
New Democratic	Hélène LeBlanc	15,566	28.95	-16.22	$46,314.39
Bloc Québécois	Gilbert Paquette	9,164	17.05	-6.39	$43,806.34
Conservative	Mohammad Zamir	3,713	6.91	-2.83	–
Green	Lorraine Banville	1,717	3.19	+0.64	–
Total valid votes/expense limit		53,763	98.49		$221,667.78
Total rejected ballots		823	1.51	–	
Turnout		54,586	64.84	–	
Eligible voters		84,192			
Liberal notional gain from New Democratic		Swing		+20.91	
Source: Elections Canada

1981 Quebec general election: Rosemont
Party	Candidate	Votes	%	±%
Parti Québécois	Gilbert Paquette	17,137	52.69	
Liberal	Gérard Latulippe	14,434	44.38	
Union Nationale	Nicole Caron	588	1.81	–
Workers Communist	Jocelyne Lachapelle	214	0.66	
Workers	Réal Labonté	109	0.34	
Marxist–Leninist	Francine Tremblay	42	0.13	
Total valid votes		32,524	100.00	
Rejected and declined votes		364		
Turnout		32,888	82.69	
Electors on the lists		39,775		

National Assembly of Quebec
Preceded by Gilles Bellemare (Liberal)	MNA for Rosemont; 1976–1985	Succeeded by Guy Rivard (Liberal)
