= Émilie Castonguay =

Canadian ice hockey executive and sports agent

Emilie Castonguay
- Born: March 13 1984; Montréal, Québec, Canada
- Education: J.D., Université de Montréal, 2012
- Occupations: Ice hockey executive; sports agent
- Organization: Vancouver Canucks
- Title: Assistant general manager (2022–)
Ice hockey career
- Position: Left wing
- Shot: Left
- Played for: Avalanche du Québec; Niagara Purple Eagles
- Playing career: 2004–2009

Emilie Castonguay (born 1984) is a Canadian ice hockey executive and the assistant general manager for the Vancouver Canucks of the National Hockey League (NHL). A former sports agent, she is the only Canadian woman to have been certified as a player agent by the National Hockey League Players' Association (NHLPA).

== Early life and education ==
Castonguay spent her early childhood living in the Pointe-Claire municipality of the urban agglomeration of Montreal. Her parents divorced when she was young and her father moved to the Outremont borough of Montreal, where she began playing youth hockey with boys.

Her play ultimately earned a scholarship to study at Niagara University and play with the Niagara Purple Eagles women's ice hockey program. During her college ice hockey career (2005 to 2009), she typically played on the third-line and amassed a total of 23 points across 121 NCAA games. Though she was not a star player on the team, she was recognized as a leader in the room and served as team captain in her final two seasons. She obtained a bachelor's degree in finance from the university, and earned National Scholar Athlete honours during her time there.

After graduating with her undergraduate degree, she enrolled at l'Université de Montréal Faculty of Law and earned Juris Doctor in 2012. During her time as a law student, she interned with Montreal Canadiens general manager Pierre Gauthier.

== Career ==
In 2016, Castonguay became the first Canadian woman to be certified as a player agent by the NHLPA. Among her notable clients were Canadian national team captain Marie-Philip Poulin and the first overall pick of the 2020 NHL entry draft, Alexis Lafrenière. She was named one of the 25 most powerful women in hockey by Sportsnet in 2020, 2021, and 2022.

On 24 January 2022, she was hired by the Vancouver Canucks as assistant general manager, becoming the second woman to hold that job in NHL history, after Angela Gorgone with the Mighty Ducks of Anaheim in 1996–97.
