= Green Party of Quebec =

Provincial political party in Canada

Green Party of Quebec Parti vert du Québec
- Abbreviation: GPQ; PVQ
- Leader: Alex Tyrrell
- Founded: 1984 and refoundation in 2001
- Headquarters: A-3729 rue Wellington Montreal, Quebec
- Membership (2020): 1,148
- Ideology: Green politics Eco-socialism; Participatory democracy Quebec federalism
- Political position: Left-wing
- International affiliation: Global Greens
- Colours: Green
- Seats in the National Assembly: 0 / 127

Website
- Official website

The Green Party of Quebec (GPQ; French: Parti vert du Québec [paʁti vɛʁ dy kebɛk], PVQ) is a Quebec political party whose platform is the promotion of green politics. It has not won any seats in the National Assembly of Quebec. Its platform is oriented towards promotion of green values, sustainable development, and participatory democracy.

The Green Party of Quebec is a coalition of activists and citizens for whom environmental questions are a priority. They believe that the government should help in creating a green, just, democratic and equal society. Their main principles are inspired from the Global Greens Charter which revolves around six main ideas: ecological wisdom, social justice, participatory democracy, nonviolence, sustainability and respect for diversity.

It received 0.76% of the popular vote in the 2022 Quebec general election.

== History ==
=== First Green Party of Quebec (1985–1998) ===
The first version of the Green Party of Québec was founded in the 1980s; the party had candidates in the 1985, 1989 and 1994 Quebec general elections. The 1989 elections results were at the time the strongest showing for any Green Party in Canada. On average, candidates collected 5.55% of votes in contested seats. Although the party had a small budget, it attempted to run a province-wide campaign with organizers from Montreal, Québec City and Sherbrooke, as well as some relatively independent local campaigns in rural ridings. Many meetings were held at Le Commensal restaurant in Montréal, a strong supporter. Attempts were made to involve the various environmental groups, but most shied away from officially supporting the PVQ in order to maintain political neutrality and protect financial interests. In the party structure of 1989, sovereignty and economical neutrality were promoted rather than left-wing policies, under the slogan of "not left or right but forward". This caused some strife within the party, as many members were more left-leaning.

The party disintegrated in 1994 due to its leader, Jean Ouimet, and many of his colleagues leaving for the Parti Québécois. Ouimet, a strong sovereigntist, maintained a party wholly independent of the federal Green Party during his leadership. Members of the Green Party of Canada formed an organization called the Green Party of Canada in Quebec, a predominantly anglophone entity that nominated federal candidates only. There was open antipathy between Ouimet and the GPCQ's leader, Rolf Bramann. (Neither was affiliated with Montreal's municipal Green Party of the time, Ecology Montreal/Montréal Écologique, led by Dimitrios Roussopoulos.) At the same time as the PVQ began to collapse due to Ouimet's departure, Rolf Bramann was removed from his position. This led to a precipitous decline in federal organization in the province contemporaneous with the marginalisation of the provincial Greens. A succession of party leaders followed: Marian Grant, Éric Ferland, Victor Martel, Saloua Laridhi, Judith Brown, and one or two others. A number of Montreal social and green activists held sway over the party until November 12, 1998, when they deliberately chose to "pull the plug" on the party.

It lost its recognition as an official political party in November 1998 when it ran no candidates in the 1998 Quebec general election. (Quebec law at the time required parties to run at least 20 candidates to maintain their official status. The Supreme Court of Canada ruled minimum candidate laws unconstitutional in 2003.)

=== Current Green Party of Quebec (since 2001) ===
The second (and current) version of the PVQ was founded in 2001 by members of the Green Party of Canada in Quebec after receiving more support in Quebec in the 2000 federal election than they had expected. The founding meeting, in the basement of the Montreal Biodome, was attended by about 20 people, and it contested the 2003 provincial election with few candidates and almost no money.

In 2002, three leftist political parties (Rassemblement pour l'alternative progressiste, Parti de la démocratie socialiste and Parti Communiste du Québec) merged to form the Union des forces progressistes. The PVQ pledged to try to avoid running candidates in ridings where there was a UFP candidate, although it reserved the right to run anywhere it wanted to (even ridings with a UFP candidate), and did not merge with the UFP. In May 2006, the Party pledged to stay independent after several appeals to join Québec solidaire, the UFP's successor.

Scott McKay was elected as party leader in 2006. The party had its most successful showing ever in the 2007 general election, placing fourth with just under four per cent of the popular vote. Unlike the previous version of the party, the new version did not adopt a position on whether Quebec should become sovereign. As a result, it was most competitive in western Montreal where there was a drop in Liberal Party support but little enthusiasm for sovereigntist alternatives such as the Parti Québécois. The Green Party placed second or third in the popular vote in some western Montreal ridings.

In 2008, the PVQ held a leadership review, during which Guy Rainville defeated Scott McKay. McKay then joined the Parti Québécois and was elected as an MNA in the 2008 election, while the Green Party itself fell to two per cent of the popular vote, fifth place among political parties and the only one of the top five parties not to win a seat in the National Assembly. On 10 September 2010, Rainville announced that he would not seek another two-year term as leader. Claude Sabourin narrowly defeated party president Paul-André Martineau for the position. Martineau had been president of the Green Party since 2006, except for a brief period in 2008. He has a Bachelor of Arts degree in Political Science from the University of Montreal (1985) and a bachelor's degree in business administration from HEC Montréal (2001). At the time of the leadership contest, he was working in information technology and pursuing a specialized graduate degree in environment and sustainable development from the Université du Québec à Montréal. He has not run for federal or provincial office.

In April 2012, the leader Claude Sabourin went to a meeting in La Pinière riding, where he recruited four future candidates, two of which – Alex Tyrrell & Marc André Beauchemin – would later run for the leadership of the party. Overall the party lost over half its support from the previous election, obtaining 1% of the overall popular vote and running candidates in only 66 of Quebec's 125 ridings during the September 4, 2012 election. Sabourin finished fifth in NDG riding with 1,531 votes and 5.77% of the vote. Alex Tyrrell finished third in Jacques Cartier with 1,522 votes and 4.54% of the vote.

Claude Sabourin resigned as party leader on Sunday, 24 February 2013 at the Green Party of Quebec convention held that weekend in Montreal. Jean Cloutier was elected interim leader that same day.

On 21 September 2013, Alex Tyrrell was elected leader of the PVQ defeating other leadership candidates Patricia Domingos, Marc-André Beauchemin and Pierre-Étienne Loignon. Another candidate Lisa Julie Cahn had withdrawn earlier in the race. At the age of 25 years Mr. Tyrrell became the youngest current party leader in Quebec politics.

The Parti vert du Québec intended to diversify its policies in view of the 2014 general elections, in order to increase its support. Tyrrell explained that the PVQ would be an eco-socialist group. Thus, the environment would remain its priority but the party would also defend a public health system and would propose among other things a universal program of dental care for all Quebecers. It is also in favour of free public transport.

In December 2019, the group Reform GPQ launched a petition asking for a general assembly to be held where a vote of confidence would take place in the leadership of Alex Tyrrell. The members accused him of having voted himself a salary and not having organized a vote of confidence. In October 2020, six members of the party's National Executive removed their trust in Alex Tyrrell's leadership and demanded his resignation, accusing him of poorly preparing the party for the 2022 election and of being responsible for the party's poor relations with his federal equivalent, the Green Party of Canada. Alex Tyrrell obtained 64.6% (with a participation rate of 65.5%) in the following vote of confidence. On October 5, 2020, five members of the Executive resigned, saying that the result were not good enough, that the process was tainted by multiple problems and that the leader acted in bad faith throughout the whole process. In January 2021, Alex Tyrrell expelled the five members of the National Executive and members Chad Walcott and Catherine Polson from the party, accusing them of harming the party's progress.

== Leaders ==
List of Quebec Green Party Leaders
Leader	Mandate
Yves Blanchette (interim)	1987–1989
Jean Ouimet	1989–1993
Marian Grant	1993–1994
Éric Ferland	1994–1996
Saloua Laridhi	1996–1998
Judith Brown	1998
The party was dissolved	1998–2001
Richard Savignac	2001–2006
Scott McKay	2006–2008
Guy Rainville	2008–2010
Claude Sabourin	2010–2013
Alex Tyrrell	since 2013

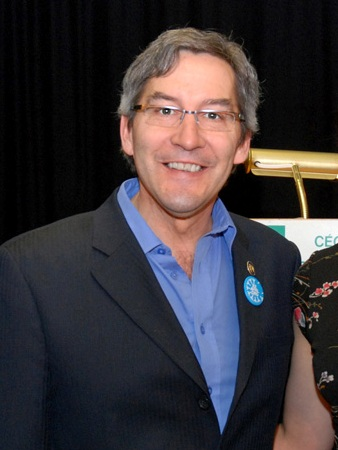
Scott McKay, leader of the GPQ from 2006 to 2008, then deputy with the Parti québécois.

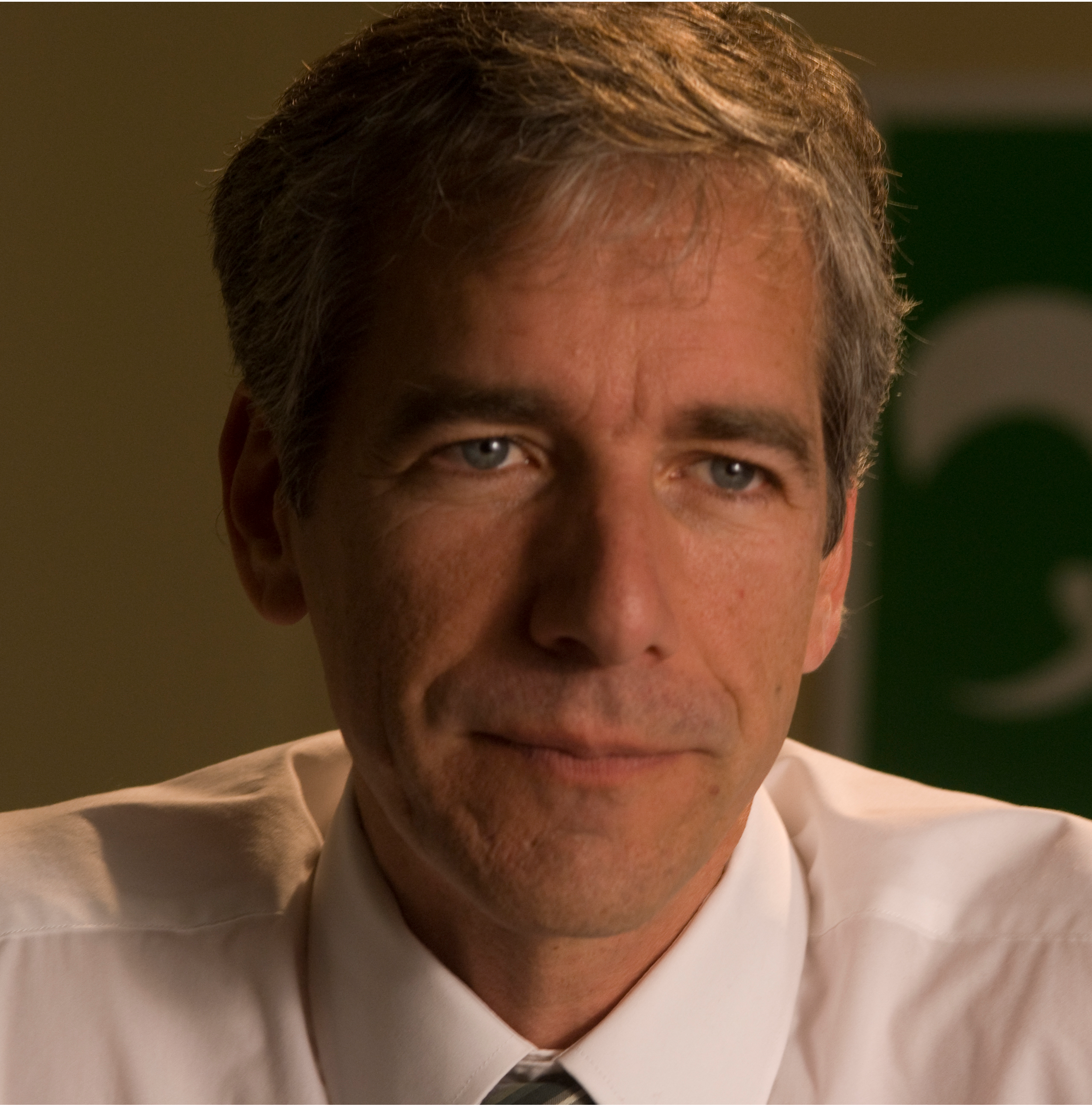
Guy Rainville, Leader of the GPQ from 2008 to 2010.

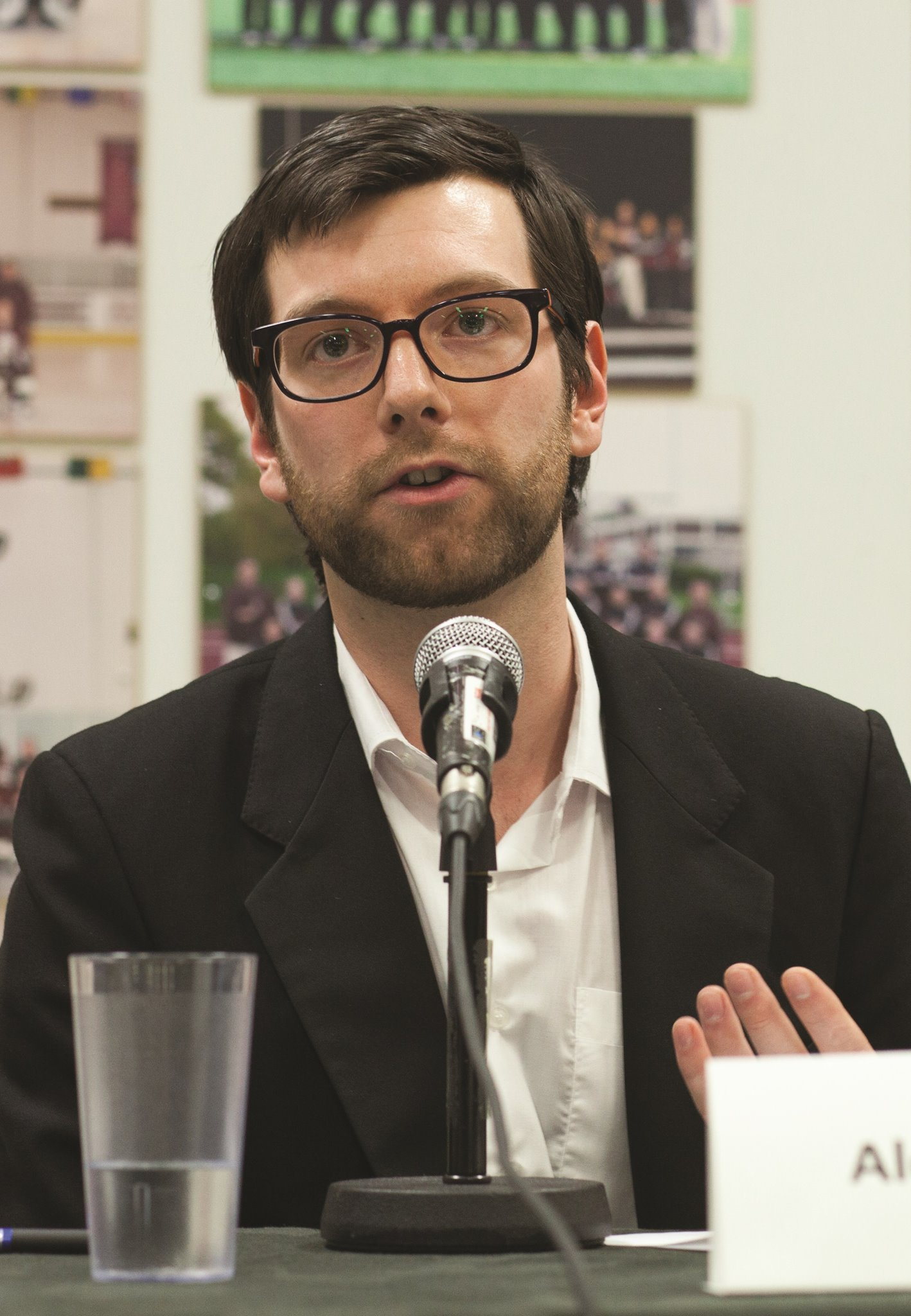
Alex Tyrrell leader of the GPQ since 2013 and the only one to remain in office for more than one election.

== Electoral results ==
Election results of the Green Party of Quebec
Election	Leader	Slogan	Candidates / Districts in election	Seats	Votes	%
1985	–	–	10 / 122	0	4,613	0.14
1989	Jean Ouimet	Progress, yes, but not at any price!	46 / 125	0	67,675	1.99
1994	Éric Ferland	–	11 / 125	0	5,499	0.14
1998	–	–	–	–	–	–
2003	Richard Savignac	For us and for our children	37 / 125	0	16,975	0.44
2007	Scott McKay	I vote	108 / 125	0	152,885	3.85
2008	Guy Rainville	Let's vote for the future	80 / 125	0	70,393	2.17
2012	Claude Sabourin	Give yourself a voice	66 / 125	0	43,394	0.99
2014	Alex Tyrrell	The eco-socialist option for Quebec!	44 / 125	0	23,163	0.55
2018	Alex Tyrrell	More than just a colour	97 / 125	0	67,870	1.69
2022	Alex Tyrrell		73 / 125	0	31,194	0.76
2026	Alex Tyrrell	The New Green Plan	37 / 127	0	12,127	0.28

=== By-elections ===
Results of the Parti vert du Québec in by-elections since 2013
Year	District	Candidate	Results (%)
2013	Outremont	Alex Tyrrell	3.79
2013	Viau	Morgan Crockett	1,67
2014	Lévis	Alex Tyrrell	1.10
2015	Richelieu	Vincent Pouliot	1.74
2015	Jean-Talon	Elodie Boisjoly-Dubreuil	2.40
2015	Fabre	Kim Raymond	3.67
2015	Saint-Henri–Sainte-Anne	Jiab Zuo	3.54
2016	Chicoutimi	Alex Tyrrell	2.47
2016	Arthabaska	Alex Tyrrell	2.11
2016	Marie-Victorin	Vincent J. Carbonneau	2.62
2016	Saint-Jérôme	Émilianne Lépine	2.06
2016	Verdun	David Cox	4.28
2017	Gouin	Alex Tyrrell	4.57
2017	Louis-Hébert	Alex Tyrrell	2.07
2018	Roberval	Alex Tyrrell	0.52
2019	Jean-Talon	Emilie Coulombe	2.79
2022	Marie-Victorin	Alex Tyrrell	0.87
2023	Saint-Henri—Sainte-Anne	Jean-Pierre Duford	1.41
2023	Jean-Talon	Kadidia Mahamane Bamba	0.59

== See also ==
- List of Green party leaders in Canada
- List of Green politicians who have held office in Canada
- List of Quebec general elections
- Political parties in Quebec
- Politics of Quebec
