= Ghislain Lebel =

Canadian politician and notary

- Born: February 17, 1946; Lévis, Quebec, Canada
- Died: January 1, 2023 (aged 76); Saint-Jean-sur-Richelieu, Quebec, Canada
- Occupations: politician and notary.

Ghislain Lebel (February 17, 1946 – January 1, 2023) was a Quebec politician and notary.

== Background ==
Ghislain Lebel has been an activist in the Quebec independence movement since his teenage years, having been part of the Rassemblement pour l'indépendance nationale, the Mouvement souveraineté-association and the Parti Québécois since its early days.

== Member of Parliament ==
Lebel ran as a Bloc Québécois candidate in the district of Chambly in the 1993 election and won. He was re-elected in the 1997 and 2000 elections.

On August 20, 2002, he crossed the floor and sat as an Independent, because of his sharp criticism of the Approche commune, an agreement with the Innu people signed by the Government of Quebec, then led by Bernard Landry and the Bloc's brother sovereigntist party, the Parti Québécois.

Lebel did not run for re-election in the 2004 election.

== Parti Québécois leadership ==
He entered the Parti Québécois leadership campaign in 2005, in which he defended a more traditional form of nationalism and ideas relatively less to the left than the other social democratic candidates. He won 458 votes, 0.4% of all ballots cast.

== Action démocratique du Québec ==
Lebel voted for the Action démocratique du Québec (ADQ) in protest in the 2007 Quebec election. He also considered running as a candidate of that party in the district of Chambly, but his offer was declined by party leader Mario Dumont.

== Parti indépendantiste ==
On April 22, 2008, Lebel joined the newly formed Parti indépendantiste. A week later, he announced his intention to run in a provincial election as the party's candidate. He came last of six candidates in the riding with less than 2% of the popular vote.

== Footnotes ==
Parliament of Canada
Preceded by Phil Edmonston (NDP)	Member of Parliament for Chambly; 1993–2004	Succeeded by The electoral district was abolished in 2003.
