= Jean Garon =

Canadian politician (1938–2014)

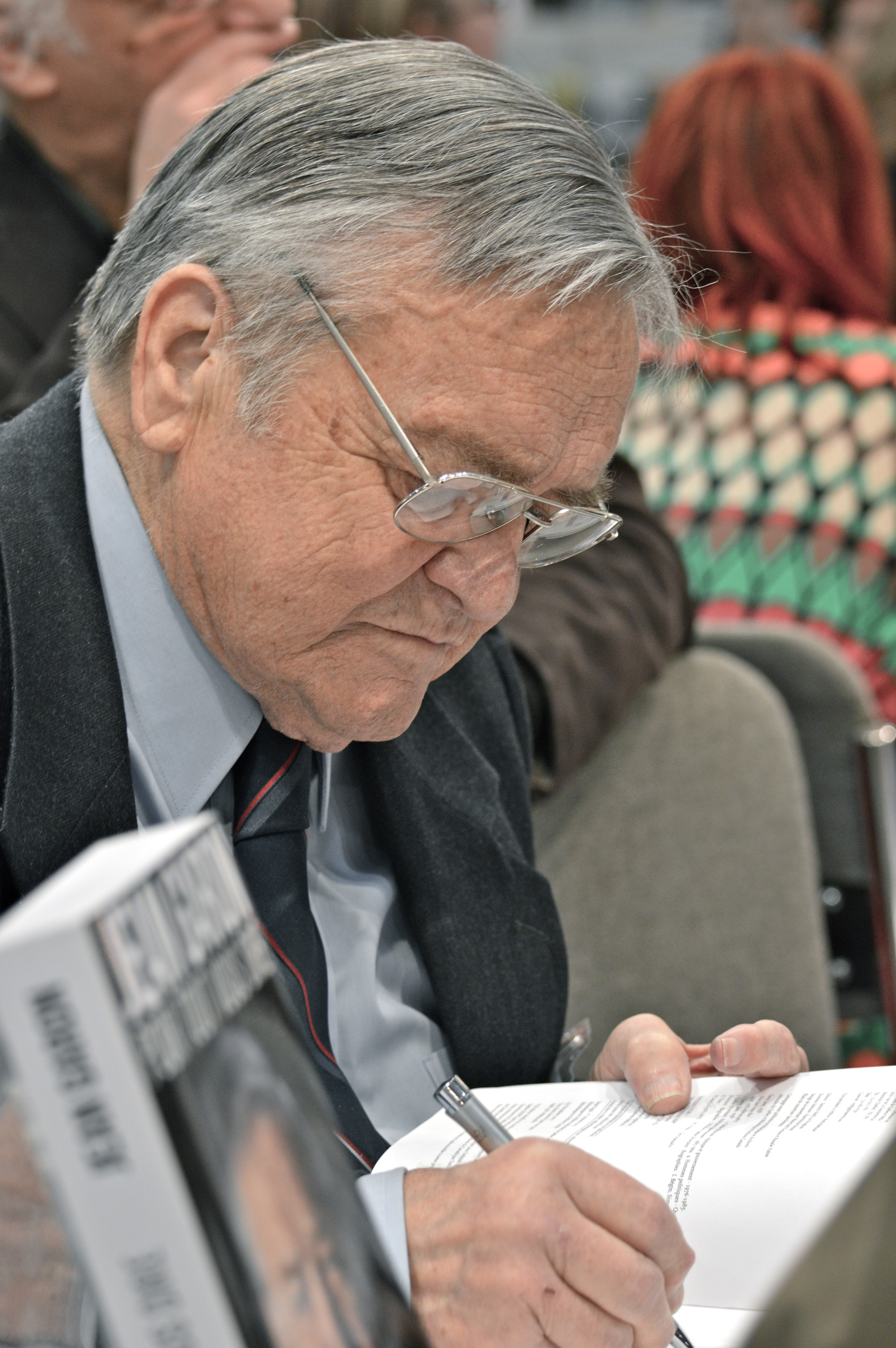
Jean Garon in 2013

Jean Garon (May 6, 1938 – July 1, 2014) was a politician, lawyer, academic and economist in Quebec, Canada.

He was born in Saint-Michel, Quebec, and graduated from Université Laval with a bachelor's degree in 1960 and a master's in economics two years later. He received a law degree in 1969 and was called to the Quebec Bar in June 1970. He was editor of Garnier, the student newspaper at Collège des Jésuites de Québec (now known as St. Charles Garnier College) from 1956 to 1958, as was an executive member of Escholiers griffonneurs, an association of student newspapers, in 1957 and 1958.

He participated in campus politics and served as prime minister of the Université Laval's model parliament.

He died on July 1, 2014 of a heart attack in Lévis, a Quebec City suburb.

== Political activism ==
He taught at Université Laval and Cégep Limoilou. As an early supporter of the Quebec independence movement he became the vice-president of the pro-sovereignty group Rassemblement pour l'Indépendance Nationale in the Quebec City area in 1962. When speaking of Quebec sovereignty, he stated, "The English-Canadians defend their interests. We just have to defend ours."

== Provincial politics ==
He was one of the founding members of the Parti Québécois in 1968. He ran for the National Assembly of Quebec in 1973 in the constituency of Charlevoix, but lost. He was elected in the constituency of Lévis in 1976 and was re-elected in 1981, 1985, 1989 and 1994.

Under René Lévesque, he was Agriculture Minister. His most notable accomplishment as Cabinet Member is the passage of a law on agricultural zoning in 1978.

After Lévesque resigned as party leader in 1985, Garon ran for the Parti Québécois leadership in 1985 but finished third with 16% of the vote, defeated by Pierre-Marc Johnson (59%).

As a Member of the Official Opposition, Garon vice-chaired, then chaired a number of parliamentary committees, including the one on Economy and Labor.

The Parti Québécois won the 1994 election and Premier Jacques Parizeau appointed Garon as Education Minister.

The resignation of Parizeau as Premier corresponds to a decline of Garon's influence in provincial politics. Garon, who belonged to the more radical wing of the PQ, was considered a close ally of Parizeau.

Premier Lucien Bouchard, who succeeded Parizeau and is widely viewed as a moderate concerning constitutional issues, did not appoint Garon to his Cabinet.

Nonetheless, Garon chaired the Parliamentary Committee on Culture.

In 2013, Garon said he is convinced that like René Lévesque, Pierre Karl Péladeau will be able to rally the necessary sovereigntist forces to make Québec a country. Garon was one of 12 sovereigntist personalities who signed a letter of support for the candidacy for the businessman for the riding of Saint-Jérôme. He confessed to having doubts that Pauline Marois would be the one who would succeed in unifying the partisans of an independent Québec. According to him, this unity is an essential condition to obtain a majority support from Québécois to the Oui side during a referendum.

== City politics ==
Garon did not run for re-election to the National Assembly in 1998. Instead, he became leader of the municipal political party Équipe Jean Garon/Parti des citoyennes et des citoyens and was elected mayor of Lévis, Quebec. He was re-elected with a majority at the City Council in 2001 (defeating Christian Jobin), in the aftermath of the province-wide municipal merger imposed by the Parti Québécois government.

In 2004, four City Councillors (Danielle Roy-Marinelli, Guy Dumoulin, Philippe Laberge, Anne Ladouceur) resigned from Garon's party and founded Lévis Force 10, Équipe Roy-Marinelli.

While running for re-election in 2005, Garon declared that opposition in city politics is a nuisance. The controversial remark undermined his campaign. He lost the election, finishing second (with 28% of the vote) behind Lévis Force 10 candidate Danielle Roy-Marinelli (42%). His party won four seats out of fifteen on the City Council, becoming the Official Opposition. City Councillor Isabelle Demers succeeded Garon as party leader.

== Later concerns in provincial politics and sovereignty ==
Garon still favoured the independence of Quebec, but was not a card-carrying supporter of the Parti Québécois after 1998. He felt that the PQ is disconnected from the concerns of those among the province's residents who live outside of Montreal's city limits. He considered running for the Action démocratique du Québec in the Montérégie area in 2007, and attended its subsequent general assembly.

== Footnotes ==
Preceded by Vincent Chagnon (Liberal)	MNA, District of Lévis; 1976–1998	Succeeded by Linda Goupil (PQ)
Preceded by Kevin Drummond (Liberal)	Minister of Agriculture; 1976–1985	Succeeded by Michel Pagé (Liberal)
Preceded by Jacques Chagnon (Liberal)	Minister of Education; 1994–1996	Succeeded by Pauline Marois (PQ)
Preceded by Denis Guay	Mayor of Lévis; 1998–2005	Succeeded by Danielle Roy-Marinelli
Preceded by n.a.	Leader of the Parti des citoyennes et des citoyens 1998–2005	Succeeded by Isabelle Demers
