= L'aut'journal =

French-language newspaper in Quebec, Canada

L'aut'journal (ISSN 0833-8965) is a French language newspaper distributed in Quebec freely and through subscription. It was founded in 1984 by political scientist and journalist Pierre Dubuc, and as of 2004 has a circulation of 35,000 copies.

It advocates Quebec sovereignty, democratic socialism and feminism, and strongly supports labour unions, from whom it receives most of its funding.

Many personalities voluntarily contribute to l'aut'journal, including:

- Élaine Audet
- Mario Beaulieu
- Roméo Bouchard
- André Bouthillier
- Michel Chartrand
- Michel Chossudovsky
- Paul Cliche
- Jean-Claude Germain
- Michel Lapierre
- Marc Laviolette
- François Parenteau
- Paul Rose
- Charles Castonguay

== See also ==
- List of Quebec media
- List of newspapers in Canada
