= Jean Ouimet =

Canadian politician (born 1954)

Jean Ouimet (born September 3, 1954, in Salaberry-de-Valleyfield, Quebec) is a Canadian politician from Quebec and the president of Naviga-Cité, a multimedia company. He is the former leader of the Parti vert du Québec, a green party, and now an activist in the sovereigntist and social democratic Parti Québécois.

== Biography ==
After attending CEGEP in sciences, Jean Ouimet studied mathematics at McGill University and the Université de Montréal before studying philosophy at the Université du Québec à Montréal. After five years of university, research in cognitive sciences and complexity followed.

An activist in the Parti Québécois in the 1970s and in the Parti vert du Québec in the 1980s, he became the latter's leader in 1989, a role he would hold until the year 1993. He then left to become an adviser on ecology for Jacques Parizeau, then leader of the Parti Québécois and Leader of the Opposition in the National Assembly of Quebec.

In 2001, after the resignation of Parti Québécois leader Lucien Bouchard, Ouimet tried to enlist as a candidate for the party leadership. His ambition was said to be motivated by his desire to spark a debate in the leadership race, which would not happen otherwise, as out of the three possible leadership contenders, François Legault and Pauline Marois withdrew, leaving Bernard Landry unopposed. Ouimet did not gather the necessary number of signatures in time to enter and Landry became leader.

Bernard Landry's resignation of 2005 left him the opportunity to try again, one that he seized. He officially issued his candidacy on September 15, 2005, for the Parti Québécois leadership campaign of 2005. He ran on a series of proposals emphasising wealth redistribution, environmentalism and participatory democracy. He also proposed a collegial structure for the party and ties his vision of sovereignty to an elaboration of a social contract. Ouimet fared poorly in the contest winning 247 votes or 0.2% of ballots cast.

== See also ==
- Parti Québécois
- Green Party of Quebec
- Quebec sovereignty movement
- Political ecology
- 2005 Parti Québécois leadership election
