= 2020 Parti Québécois leadership election =

Provincial party election in Canada

- October 9, 2020
- Turnout: 71%
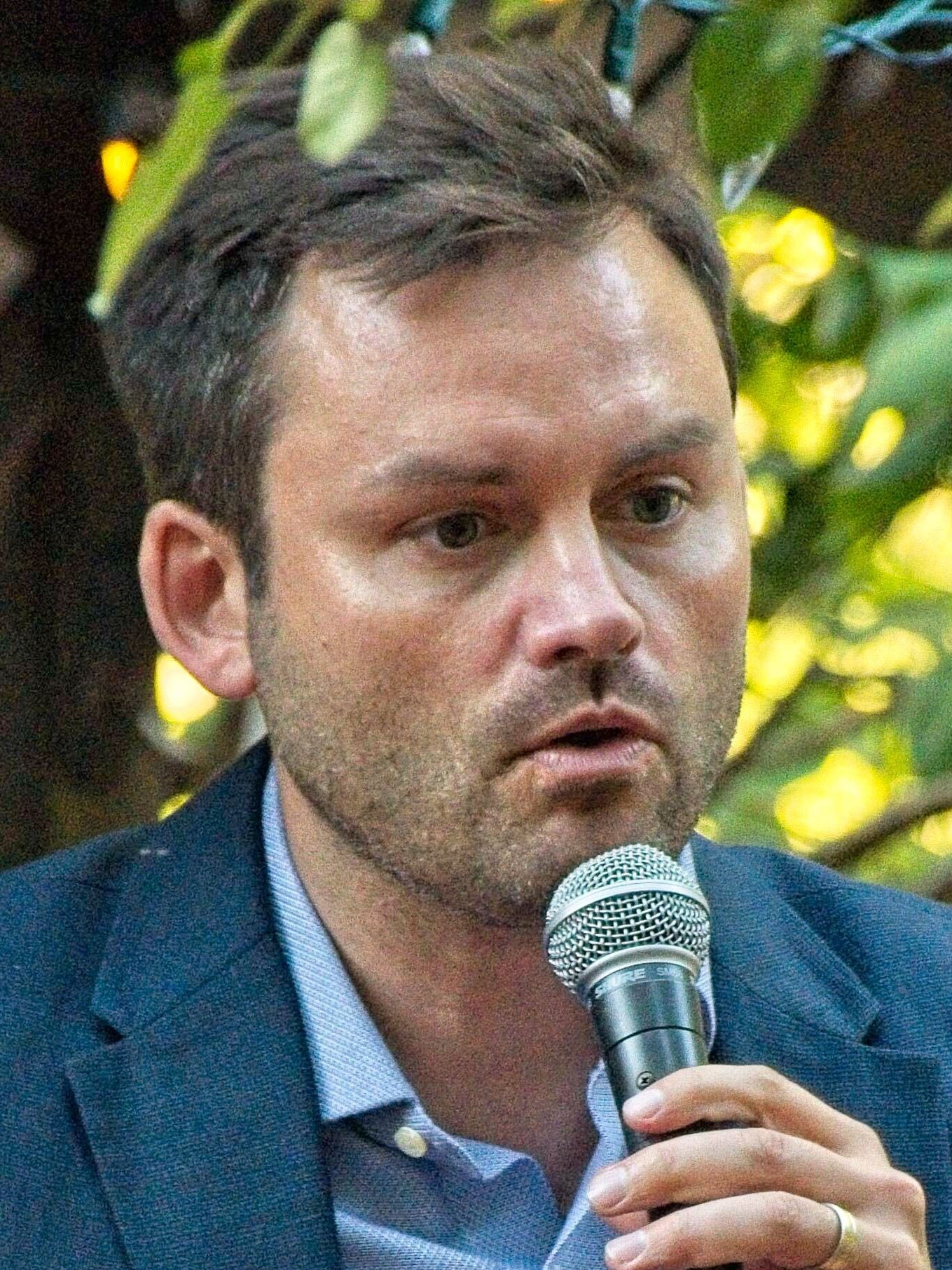

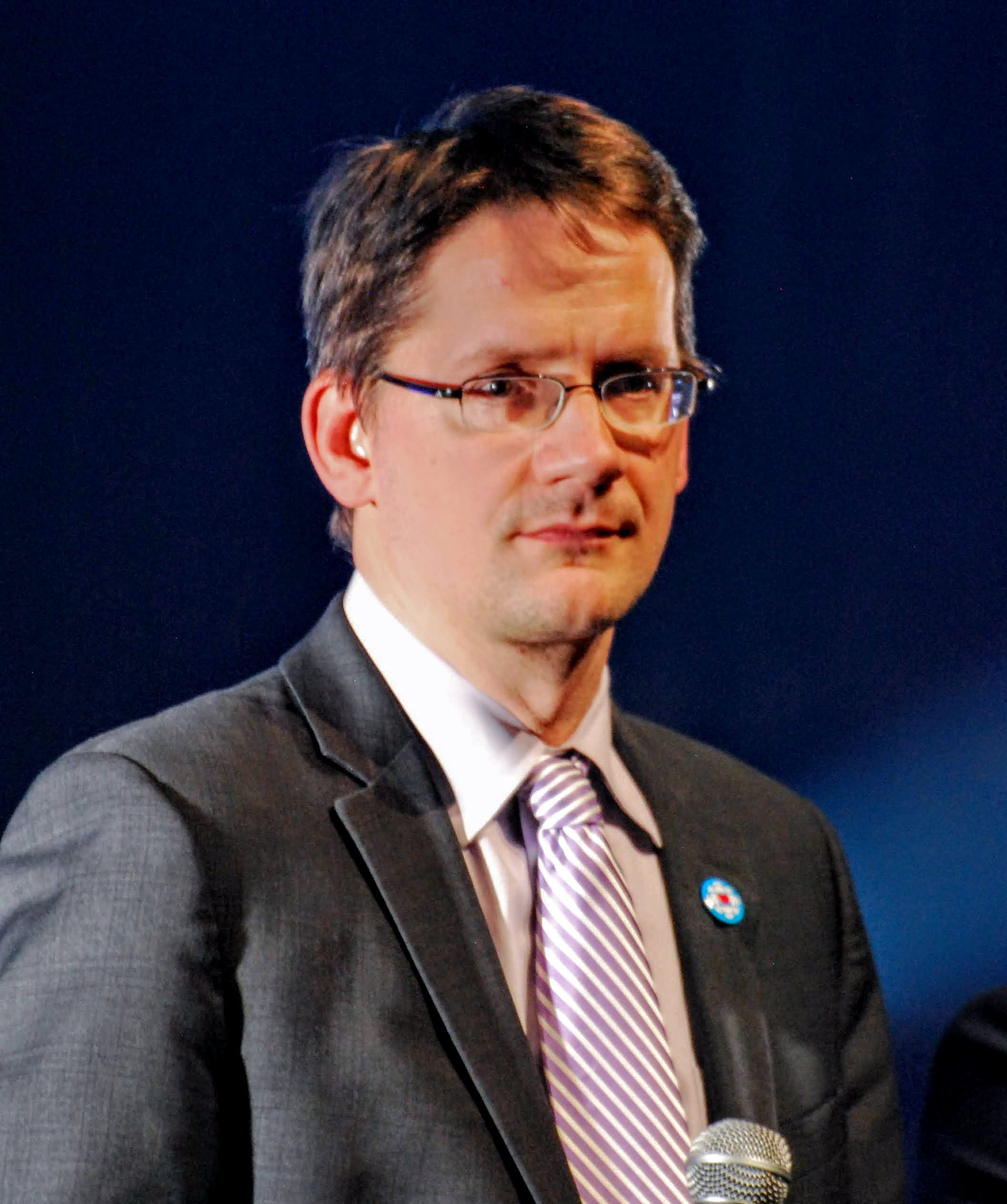

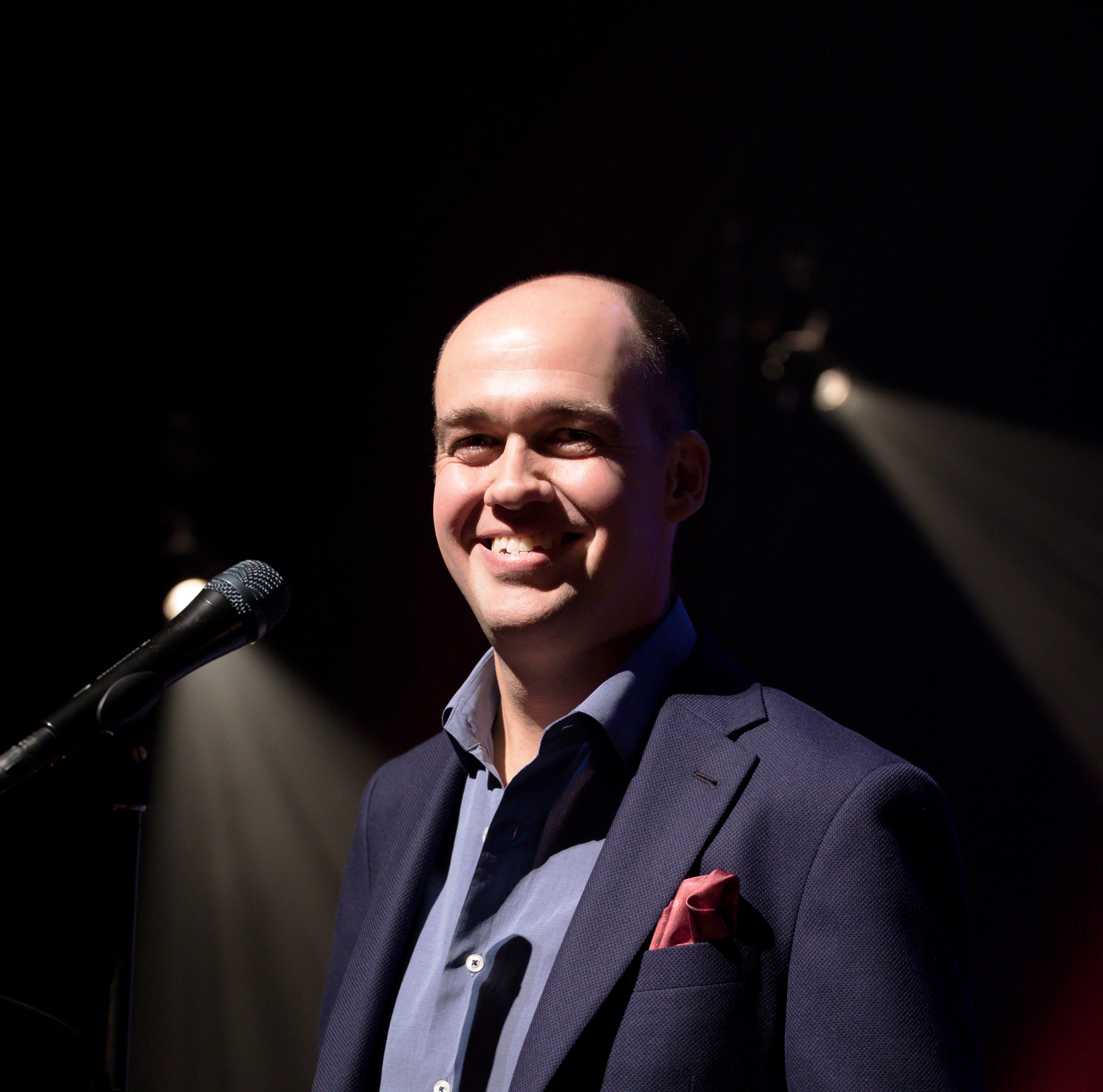

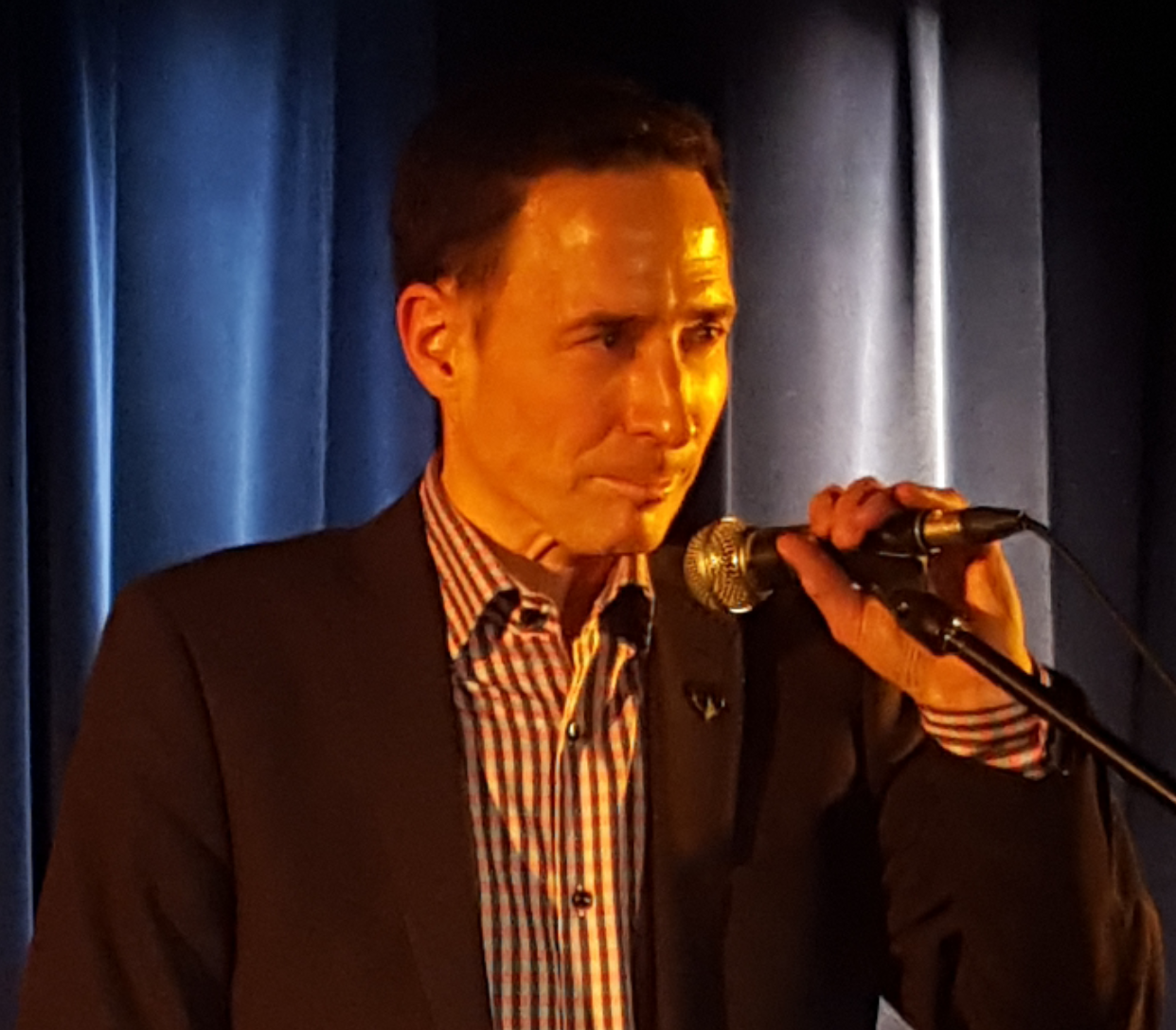
Candidate	Paul St-Pierre Plamondon	Sylvain Gaudreault
1st Ballot	9,042	8,415
percentage	35.44%	32.98%
3rd Ballot	13,530	10,621
percentage	56.02%	43.98%
Candidate	Guy Nantel	Frédéric Bastien
1st Ballot	5,449	2,559
percentage	21.55%	10.03%
3rd Ballot	Eliminated	Eliminated
Leader before election
Jean-François Lisée
Elected Leader
Paul St-Pierre Plamondon

2020 Parti Québécois leadership election
- Date: October 5–9, 2020
- Resigning leader: Jean-François Lisée
- Won by: Paul St-Pierre Plamondon
- Ballots: 3
- Candidates: 4
- Entrance fee: $25,000
- Spending limit: $125,000

The 2020 Parti Québécois leadership election was held on 9 October 2020, to replace Jean-François Lisée, who resigned on 1 October 2018 after leading the Parti Québécois to a third-place finish in the 2018 Quebec general election and failing to be re-elected in his own riding.

Paul St-Pierre Plamondon was elected on the third ballot with 56% of the vote.

The election was originally scheduled for 19 June but was postponed due to the COVID-19 pandemic in Quebec.

Under Paul St-Pierre Plamondon's leadership, the PQ lost the 2022 Quebec general election, and won the 2026 Quebec general election.

== Background ==
On 1 October 2018, the Parti Québécois came in third in the Quebec general election, winning only ten seats and 17% of the popular vote, an all-time low. PQ leader Jean-François Lisée announces his resignation as leader after losing his own riding.

Pascal Bérubé was named interim leader on 9 October 2018.

On 13 December 2019, Bérubé announced that the campaign would start on 1 February 2020 and that the leader would be chosen before 24 June 2020.

== Process ==
The nomination period officially began on March 2 and ended on April 9. To obtain an application form, each aspiring candidate had to give the party a non-refundable amount of $10,000. To make their candidacy official, each candidate must have submitted their ballot signed by at least 2,000 members from at least 9 administrative regions and at least 50 local associations and pay the party a non-refundable amount of $15,000.

For the first time, the Parti Québécois allowed both party members and supporters to participate in the election of the leader. Supporters had to pay $5̩ to obtain the right to vote. Anyone enjoying the status of voter in Quebec could contribute to the campaign of a leadership contestant by paying him an amount that cannot exceed $500. Applicants' maximum campaign expenses could not exceed $125,000. Two debates were to be organized by the Parti Québécois between April 15 and May 20, with one to take place in Montreal and the other in Centre-du-Québec, but they were postponed.

The voting period was to have begun on June 15 at 9 a.m. and end on June 19 at 3 p.m. but was delayed until the autumn. Voting took place by preferential ballot. Thus, a candidate who collected 50% + 1 vote would win. If necessary, a second or even a third round would be held to, after distribution of the 2nd and 3rd choices, choose a winner. The results were to be announced by the returning officer, in a location to be determined in either the Capitale-Nationale or Chaudière-Appalaches regions.

== Candidates ==
=== Declared ===
- Frédéric Bastien, historian, college teacher
- Sylvain Gaudreault, former interim leader of Parti Québécois (2016), former Leader of the Official Opposition in Quebec (2016), MNA for Jonquière (2007–2022), Minister of Transport and Municipal Affairs under Pauline Marois
- Guy Nantel, comedian
- Paul St-Pierre Plamondon, 2016 leadership candidate (fourth place), lawyer, political columnist, essayist and commentator.

=== Did not qualify ===
- Laurent Vézina, businessman
- Gloriane Blais, lawyer

=== Declined ===
- Yves-François Blanchet, MP for Beloeil—Chambly (2019–present), Bloc Québécois leader (2019–present), Québec Minister of Sustainable Development, Environment, Wildlife and Parks (2012-2014), MPP in Quebec National Assembly (2008-2014)
- Alexandre Cloutier, two-time PQ leadership runner-up in the 2015 and 2016, MNA for Lac-Saint-Jean (2007–2018), Minister responsible for the Nord-du-Québec region, Côte-Nord region, Canadian Intergovernmental Affairs, the Canadian Francophonie and Sovereignist Governance under Pauline Marois, currently out of politics.
- Stéphane Handfield, lawyer
- Véronique Hivon, PQ deputy leader, MNA for Joliette (2008–2022), Minister of Social Services and Youth Protection, Minister responsible for the Lanaudière region and Minister responsible for the Die in Dignity commission under Pauline Marois
- Pierre Karl Péladeau, former PQ leader (2015–2016), MNA for Saint-Jérôme (2014–2016), President and CEO of Quebecor

== Campaign ==
=== Paul St-Pierre Plamondon ===
Pierre Plamondon supported "forceful measures" to promote the French language while preserving the rights of the Anglophone minority. Plamondon also pledged to hold a sovereignty referendum in the first mandate of a PQ government. In Plamondon 2016 run, he opposed holding a referendum on sovereignty during a PQ government's first mandate.

=== Guy Nantel ===
Guy Nantel advocated giving English the status of a "national language minority".

== Results ==
Results by round
Candidate	1st round		2nd round		3rd round	
Candidate	Votes cast	%	Votes cast	%	Votes cast	%
Paul St-Pierre Plamondon	9,042	35.44%	10,554	41.59%	13,530	56.02%
Sylvain Gaudreault	8,415	32,98%	8,906	35.09%	10,621	43.98%
Guy Nantel	5,499	21.55%	5,917	23.32%	Eliminated	
Frédéric Bastien	2,559	10.03%	Eliminated			
Total	25,515	100%	25,377	100%	24,151	100%

== See also ==
- Parti Québécois leadership elections
