= Pierre-Luc Brillant =

Canadian actor and musician

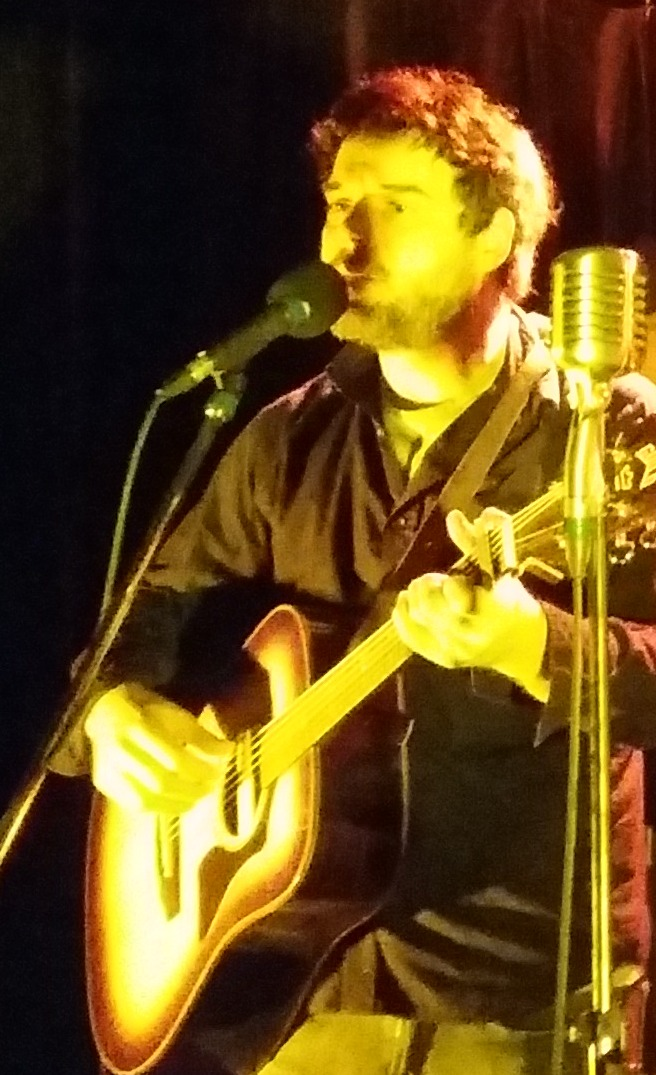
- Brillant in 2016
- Born: January 29, 1978 (age 48); Mont St. Hilaire, Quebec, Canada
- Occupations: actor, musician
- Spouse: Isabelle Blais

Pierre-Luc Brillant (born January 29, 1978) is a Canadian actor and musician. He is best known for his performance in the film C.R.A.Z.Y., for which he received a Prix Jutra nomination for Best Supporting Actor in 2006.

Brillant is also a musician and songwriter. He has recorded two albums as a duo with his spouse, actress and singer Isabelle Blais.

After making the leap into politics in the 2022 Quebec general election under the banner of the Parti Québécois in the riding of Rosemont, he became vice-president of the Union des artistes in April of the following year. He was also candidate in the 2026 Quebec general election.

== Selected filmography ==
- The Clean Machine (Tirelire Combines & Cie) - 1992
- Matusalem II - 1997
- Memories Unlocked (Souvenirs intimes) - 1999
- Life After Love (La vie après l'amour) - 2000
- C.R.A.Z.Y. - 2005
- On the Trail of Igor Rizzi (Sur la trace d'Igor Rizzi) - 2006
- Deliver Me (Délivrez-moi) - 2006
- My Daughter, My Angel (Ma fille, mon ange) - 2007
- Borderline - 2008
- Everything Is Fine (Tout est parfait) - 2008
- The Kate Logan Affair - 2010
- La Run - 2011
- Fear of Water (La Peur de l'eau) - 2011
- Small Blind (La mise à l'aveugle) - 2012
- The Fireflies Are Gone (La disparition des lucioles) - 2018
- The Nest (Le nid) - 2018
- How to Get Your Parents to Divorce (Pas d'chicane dans ma cabane!) - 2022
- Invincible - 2022
- Ababooned (Ababouiné) - 2024

== Electoral record ==
2026 Quebec general election: Rosemont
** Preliminary results — Not yet official **
Party	Candidate	Votes	%	±%
Québec solidaire	Gisèle Pouhe Njall	14,168	39.22	
Parti Québécois	Pierre-Luc Brillant	10,086	27.92	
Liberal	David Lavoie	7,177	19.87	
Coalition Avenir Québec	Nour Aliyah Attié	2,468	6.83	
Conservative	Mildred Mathieu	1,871	5.18	
Climat Québec	Thierry Paquin	224	0.62	
Independent	Jean Duval	134	0.37	
Total valid votes				
Total rejected ballots				
Turnout			70.19	
Electors on the lists			–	–
Québec solidaire hold		Swing		
Source: Élections Québec

2022 Quebec general election: Rosemont
Party	Candidate	Votes	%	±%
Québec solidaire	Vincent Marissal	13,311	37.62	+2.37
Coalition Avenir Québec	Sandra O'Connor	8,157	23.06	+7.50
Parti Québécois	Pierre-Luc Brillant	7,527	21.27	-7.16
Liberal	Sherlyne Duverneau	4,170	11.79	-4.98
Conservative	Marie-France Lemay	1,605	4.54	+3.95
Green	Jamie D’Souza	452	1.28	-0.14
Climat Québec	Jean-François Racine	158	0.45	–
Total valid votes		35,380	98.87	–
Total rejected ballots		405	1.13	-0.33
Turnout		35,785	68.22	-1.18
Electors on the lists		52,457	–	–
