= Progressive Conservative Party of Quebec candidates in the 1989 Quebec provincial election =

The Progressive Conservative Party of Quebec fielded twelve candidates in the 1989 provincial election, none of whom were elected. The party was not affiliated with the Progressive Conservative Party of Canada.

== Candidates ==
=== Rosemont: Lyse T. Giguère ===
Lyse T. Giguère received 298 votes (1.07%), finishing fourth against Liberal Party incumbent Guy Rivard.
