= Parti des travailleurs du Québec candidates in the 1989 Quebec provincial election =

The Parti des travailleurs du Québec fielded nineteen candidates in the 1989 Quebec provincial election, none of whom were elected.

== Candidates ==
=== Rosemont: Régis Beaulieu ===
Régis Beaulieu received 256 votes (0.92%), finishing sixth against Liberal incumbent Guy Rivard.
