= Parti indépendantiste candidates in the 1989 Quebec provincial election =

The Parti indépendantiste fielded twelve candidates in the 1989 Quebec provincial election, none of whom were elected.

== Candidates ==
=== Rosemont: Richard Belleau ===
Richard Belleau received 278 votes (1.00%), finishing fifth against Liberal incumbent Guy Rivard.
