= Gisèle Pouhe Njall =

Canadian politician

Gisèle Pouhe Njall MNA
- Gisèle Pouhe Njall at her nomination as candidate for Québec solidaire in 2026

Member of the National Assembly for Rosemont
- Incumbent
- Assumed office October 5, 2026
- Preceded by: Vincent Marissal

Personal details
- Party: Québec solidaire

Gisèle Pouhe Njall is a member of Québec solidaire elected for the riding of Rosemont.

Pouhe Njall is originally from Cameroon.

== Electoral record ==
2026 Quebec general election: Rosemont
** Preliminary results — Not yet official **
Party	Candidate	Votes	%	±%
Québec solidaire	Gisèle Pouhe Njall	14,168	39.22	
Parti Québécois	Pierre-Luc Brillant	10,086	27.92	
Liberal	David Lavoie	7,177	19.87	
Coalition Avenir Québec	Nour Aliyah Attié	2,468	6.83	
Conservative	Mildred Mathieu	1,871	5.18	
Climat Québec	Thierry Paquin	224	0.62	
Independent	Jean Duval	134	0.37	
Total valid votes				
Total rejected ballots				
Turnout			70.19	
Electors on the lists			–	–
Québec solidaire hold		Swing		
Source: Élections Québec
