= Frédéric Bastien =

Canadian author (1969–2023)

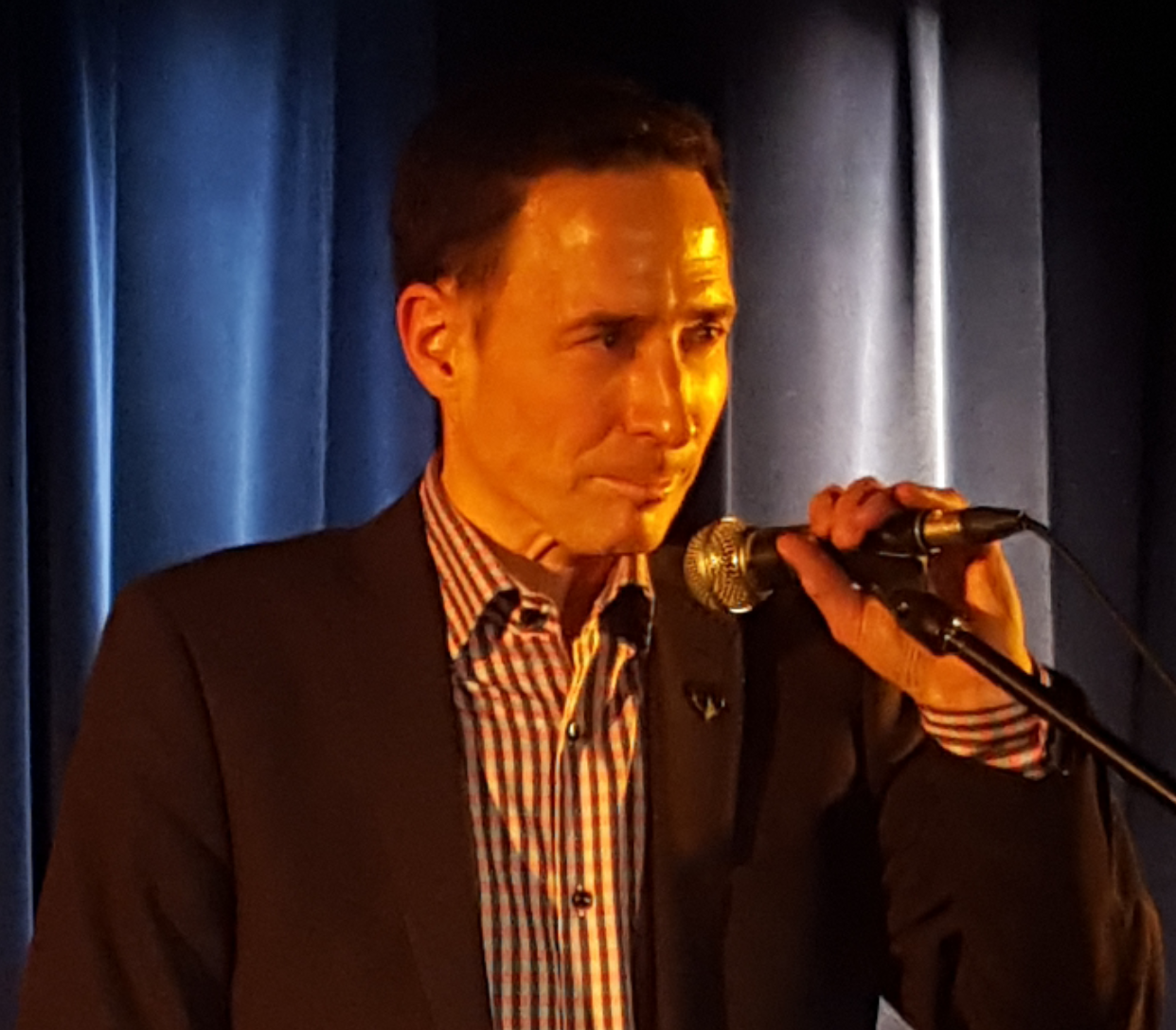
Bastien in 2020

Frédéric Bastien (1969 – 16 May 2023) was a Canadian author, historian, and journalist, best known for the book La Bataille de Londres. Dessous, secrets et coulisses du rapatriement constitutionnel, whose allegations surrounding the 1982 patriation of Canada's constitution caused political controversy in Quebec and led the Supreme Court of Canada to launch an internal probe.

== Biography ==
Bastien held a PhD in history and international politics from the Graduate Institute of International and Development Studies in Geneva and authored two books dealing with Paris-Québec-Ottawa relations since the Quiet Revolution. He was a history professor at Dawson College in Montreal, Canada.

Bastien died on 16 May 2023, at the age of 53.

== La Bataille de Londres ==
In La Bataille de Londres. Dessous, secrets et coulisses du rapatriement constitutionnel, Bastien alleges that the patriation of Canada's constitution in 1982 amounted to a "coup d'etat". In particular, Bastien names then Chief Justice of Canada, Bora Laskin, as providing information to the British and Canadian governments in such a way as to breach the separation of executive and judicial powers.

These allegations were brought to the attention of then Chief Justice of Canada, Beverley McLachlin, who undertook to review the matter. In April 2013, the Supreme Court of Canada launched an internal investigation into the book's claims. However, the court concluded its review after failing to find relevant documents in its archives.

=== Reaction ===
Alexandre Cloutier, Quebec Intergovernmental Affairs Minister, claimed La Bataille de Londres "shows just how far Prime Minister Pierre Elliott Trudeau was ready to go and what means he was willing to use to force the Constitution down the throat of Quebecers, gestures that are extremely serious."

Canadian Prime Minister Stephen Harper, when asked about the controversy during a visit in Quebec, dismissed Bastien's allegations, saying "I think that the whole population is fed up with this discussion."

The Dorchester Review commented that Bastien "has ... succeeded in challenging the historical legitimacy and ethics of the Trudeau government ... revealing a new insight into the chicanery with which the Charter of Rights and Freedoms was imposed on Canadians, who did not need it and never asked for it." "Trudeau's Chief Judicial Activist," The Dorchester Review (Spring/Summer 2013, p. 94)

== Political career ==
Bastien ran to be leader of the Parti Québécois in the 2020 Parti Québécois leadership election, and came in fourth, losing to Paul St-Pierre Plamondon.

== Bibliography ==
- Relations particulières: la France face au Québec après de Gaulle (1999), Éditions du Boréal ISBN 9782890529762
- Le poids de la coopération:le rapport France-Québec (2006), Québec Amérique ISBN 9782764405123
- La Bataille de Londres: Dessous, secrets et coulisses du rapatriement constitutionnel (2013), Éditions du Boréal ISBN 9782764622278
- The Battle of London: Trudeau, Thatcher, and the Fight for Canada's Constitution (2014), Dundurn Press ISBN 9781459723290
