= Rita Dionne-Marsolais =

Canadian politician

MNA for Rosemont
- In office September 12, 1994 – December 8, 2008
- Preceded by: Guy Rivard
- Succeeded by: Louise Beaudoin

Personal details
- Born: April 20, 1947 (age 79) Sherbrooke, Quebec
- Party: Parti Québécois
- Profession: economist

Rita Dionne-Marsolais (born April 20, 1947) is a former Quebec politician and economist. She was the Member of National Assembly of Quebec for the riding of Rosemont in the Montreal region and represented the Parti Québécois from 1994 to 2008.

Dionne-Marsolais went at the Université de Montréal and obtained a bachelor's degree in economics and a master's degree in econometrics. She later became an economist at Hydro-Québec and was an assistant to the company's president. She was also the vice-president in the development sector for the Société générale de financement. After being the Quebec delegate in New York, she was an economist for Price Waterhouse.

In addition, she was an administration member of the Ordre des architectes du Québec, the Quebec Bar, the Montreal Symphony Orchestra, the Saint-Luc Hospital in Montreal and the Board of Trade of Metropolitan Montreal as well as the free trade committee. She would be later involved in politics as the treasurer of the Parti Québécois.

She entered politics in 1994 and was elected in Rosemont in 1994. She held several Cabinet positions including tourism (1994–1996), culture and communications (1994–1995), industry and trade (1996–1997) and revenue (1998). After being re-elected in 1998, she was named minister for revenue (1998–1999) and natural resources (2001–2003). She was also a member of several committees and a delegate member for relations with several world regions including the Middle East and Brazil.

While the Parti Québécois lost the 2003 elections to the Liberals, she was re-elected for a third term in 2003 and for a fourth term in 2007. In late October 2008, she announced her retirement from politics becoming effective when the general elections were announced on November 5, 2008. Former Minister Louise Beaudoin is the PQ candidate.

== Electoral record (partial) ==
1998 Quebec general election: Rosemont
Party	Candidate	Votes	%	±%
Parti Québécois	Rita Dionne-Marsolais	14,116	47.95	−1.30
Liberal	Jonathan Sauvé	11,448	38.88	−2.02
Action démocratique	Alain Arbour	3,029	10.29	+3.79
Bloc Pot	Alexandre Néron	296	1.01	–
Socialist Democracy	Roy Semak	263	0.89	−1.20
Natural Law	Michèle Beausoleil	199	0.68	−0.08
Communist	Michèle Breton	90	0.31	–
Total valid votes		29,441	100.00	
Rejected and declined votes		413		
Turnout		29,854	77.36	−6.35
Electors on the lists		38,592		
Source: Official Results, Le Directeur général des élections du Québec.

1994 Quebec general election: Rosemont
Party	Candidate	Votes	%
Parti Québécois	Rita Dionne-Marsolais	14,736	49.25
Liberal	Nicole Thibodeau	12,236	40.90
Action démocratique	Luc Leclerc	1,946	6.50
New Democratic	Manon Leclerc	626	2.09
Natural Law	Marc Roy	226	0.76
Commonwealth of Canada	Normand Bélanger	149	0.50
Total valid votes		29,919	
Rejected and declined votes		651	
Turnout		30,570	83.71
Electors on the lists		36,518	

Political offices
Preceded by Roger Bertrand	Minister/Delegate Minister of Revenue; 1997–1999	Succeeded by Paul Bégin
Preceded by Daniel Paille	Minister of Industry and Commerce; 1996–1997	Succeeded by Roger Bertrand
Preceded by Daniel Paille	Minister of Science and Technology; 1996–1998	Succeeded by François Legault
Preceded by Marie Malavoy	Minister of Culture and Communications; 1994–1995	Succeeded by Jacques Parizeau
