= 2016 Parti Québécois leadership election =

Political party election in Quebec, Canada

- October 7, 2016
- Turnout: 75.09%
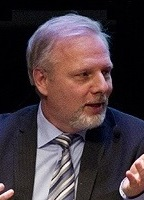

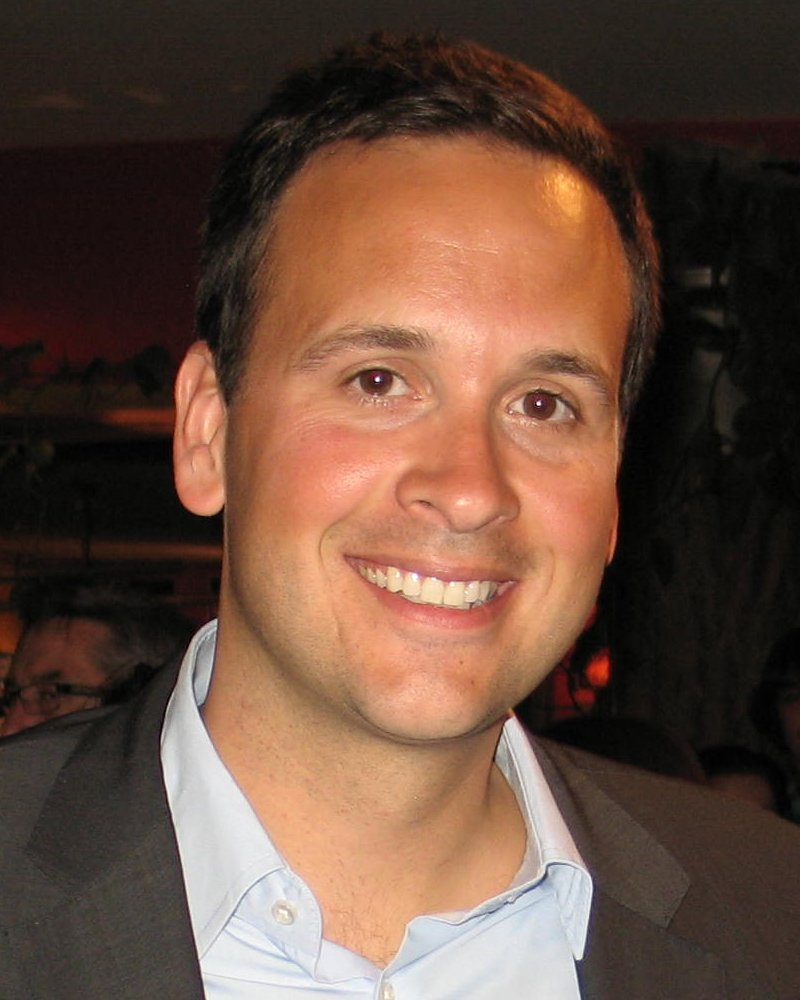

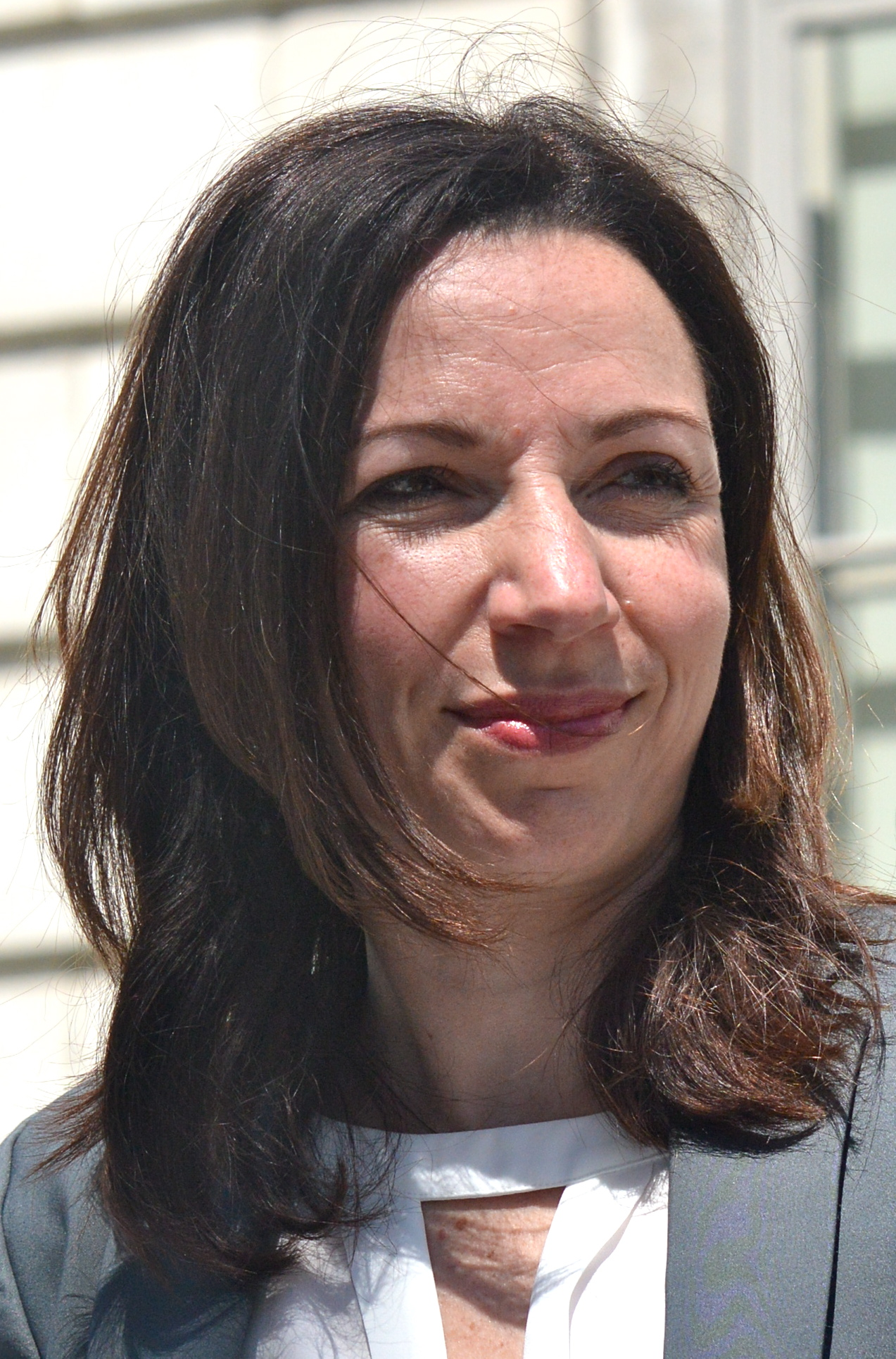

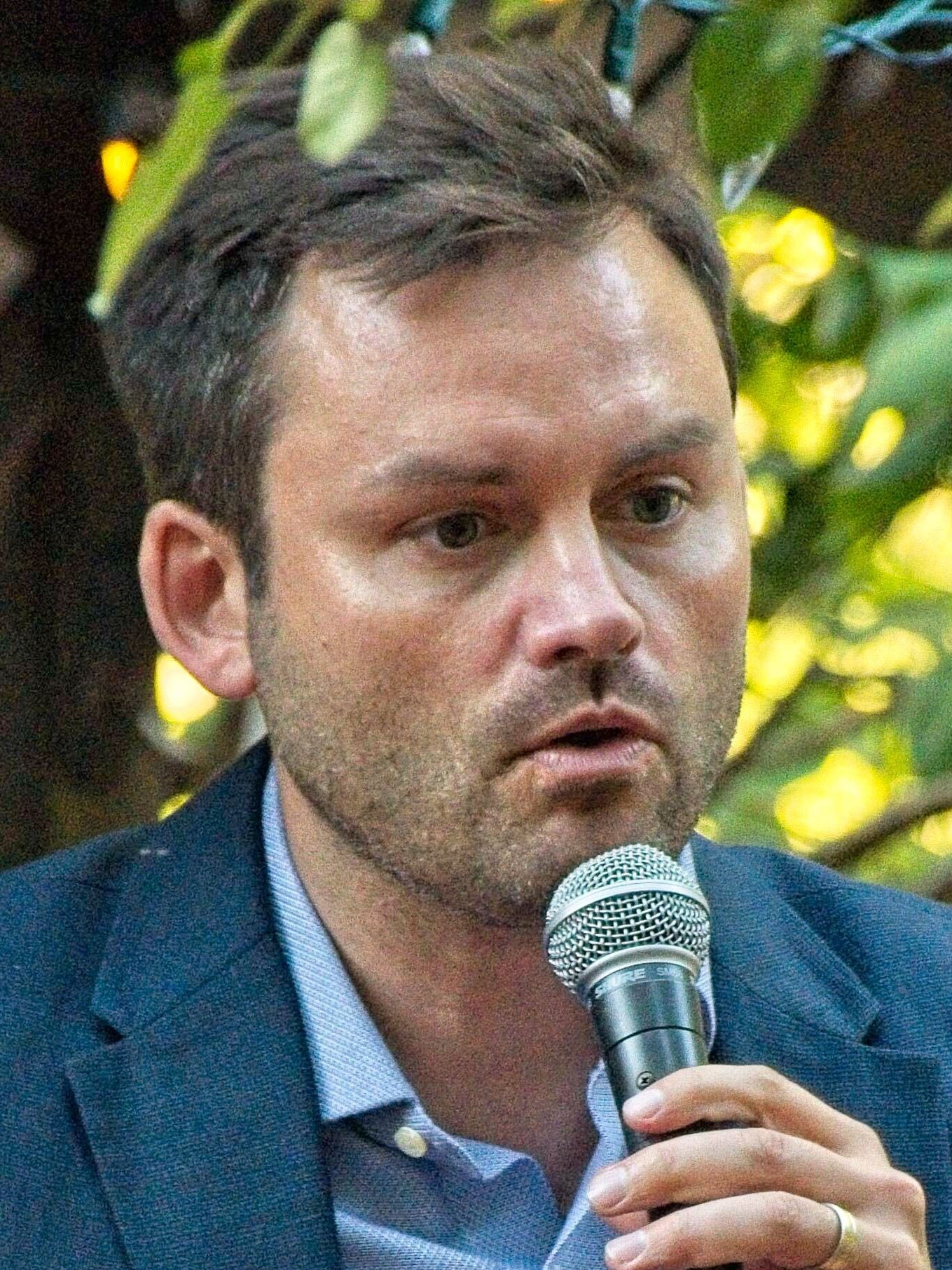
Candidate	Jean-François Lisée	Alexandre Cloutier
1st Ballot	25,936	16,357
percentage	47.03%	29.66%
2nd Ballot	27,801	17,403
percentage	50.63%	31.70%
Candidate	Martine Ouellet	Paul St-Pierre Plamondon
1st Ballot	9,077	3,772
percentage	16.46%	6.84%
2nd Ballot	9,702	Eliminated
percentage	17.67%
Leader before election
Pierre Karl Péladeau
Elected Leader
Jean-François Lisée

2016 Parti Québécois leadership election
- Date: October 5–7, 2016
- Resigning leader: Pierre Karl Péladeau
- Won by: Jean-François Lisée
- Ballots: 2
- Candidates: 4
- Entrance fee: $20,000
- Spending limit: $200,000

The 2016 Parti Québécois leadership election occurred from October 5 to October 7, 2016 due to the resignation of Parti Québécois leader Pierre Karl Péladeau on May 2, 2016. Jean-François Lisée was elected on the second ballot with 50.63% of the vote.

To be nominated, a candidate paid a $20,000 non-refundable registration fee and submitted signatures of 1,500 party members from the provinces 45 different ridings in Quebec's seven regions by June 30, 2016. The campaign spending limit was $200,000 per candidate.

== Timeline ==
- May 2, 2016 - Pierre Karl Péladeau announces his resignation as leader.
- May 6, 2016 - Sylvain Gaudreault (Jonquière) is elected interim leader by the party's caucus, defeating Agnès Maltais (Taschereau).
- May 7, 2016 - The party's executive council decides that the leadership election will be held between September 15 and October 15, 2016.
- May 28–29, 2016 - Leadership election rules and timetable to be finalized at a meeting of riding association presidents in Drummondville, Quebec.
- June 30, 2016 - Deadline for candidates to be nominated and to make first deposit of $10,000.
- August 30, 2016 - Deadline for second deposit of $10,000.
- October 5–7, 2016 - Voting takes place online and by phone using a preferential ballot.
- October 7, 2016 - Results announced at a rally in Quebec City.

== Candidates ==
=== Alexandre Cloutier ===
Background

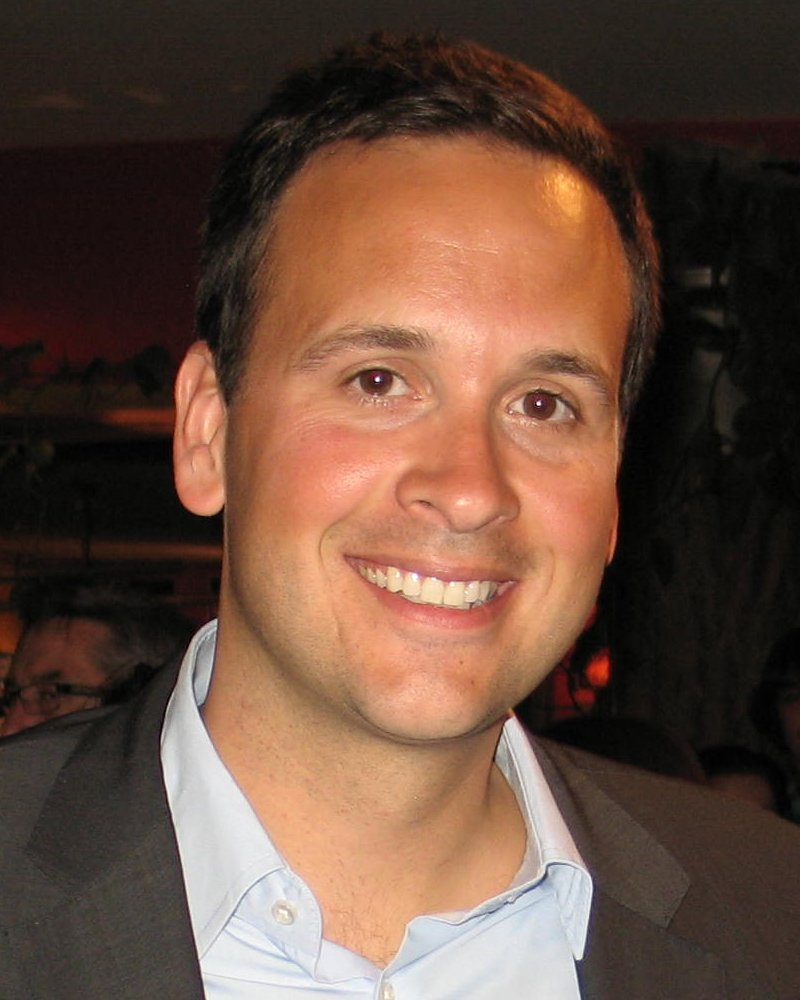
Alexandre Cloutier, MNA for Lac-Saint-Jean

MNA for Lac-Saint-Jean (2007–2018), Minister for Canadian Intergovernmental Affairs, the Canadian Francophonie and Sovereignist Governance (2012–2014), second-place finisher in 2015 leadership election.

Date candidacy declared: May 13, 2016
Supporters
Support from caucus members: (14) François Gendron (Abitibi-Ouest), Agnès Maltais (Taschereau), Sylvain Roy (Bonaventure), Harold Lebel (Rimouski), Dave Turcotte (Saint-Jean), Martin Ouellet (René-Lévesque), Sylvain Rochon (Richelieu), Guy Leclair (Beauharnois), Nicole Léger (Pointe-aux-Trembles), Diane Lamarre (Taillon), Maka Kotto (Bourget), Mireille Jean (Chicoutimi), Sylvain Pagé (Labelle), Gaétan Lelièvre (Gaspé)
Support from former caucus members: Stéphane Bédard (Chicoutimi, 1998-2015), former interim leader (2014-2015), Guy Julien (Trois-Rivières), Yves Duhaime (Saint-Maurice), Jean-Pierre Jolivet (Laviolette), Élaine Zakaïb (Richelieu), Serge Geoffrion (La Prairie), Jérôme Proulx (Saint-Jean)
Other prominent supporters: Bernard Landry (Former Premier of Quebec)
Policies: Does not intend to call a sovereignty referendum until a PQ government's second term, if there is a 'groundswell' of support. Says education is a priority and also supports measures to keep corporate head offices from leaving Quebec. Also supports protecting the French language and entrenching secularism in Quebec's constitution.

During the election, Cloutier was criticized by Jean-François Lisée for wishing Muslims a happy Eid in a social media post, and Lisée attempted to link Cloutier to controversial imam Adil Charkaoui.

=== Jean-François Lisée ===
Background

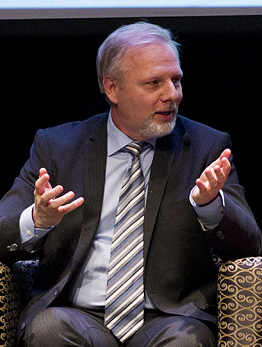
Jean-François Lisée, MNA for Rosemont

MNA for Rosemont (2012–2018), Minister of International Relations, La Francophonie and External Trade (2012–2014), former journalist and professor. Ran in 2015 leadership election but withdrew.

Date candidacy declared: May 16, 2016
Supporters
Support from caucus members: (5) Carole Poirier (Hochelaga-Maisonneuve), Alain Therrien (Sanguinet), Mathieu Traversy (Terrebonne), André Villeneuve (Berthier), Pascal Bérubé (Matane-Matapédia)
Support from former caucus members:
Other prominent supporters:
Policies: Opposes holding a referendum in a PQ government's first mandate and opposes any government initiatives or public spending to lay the groundwork for sovereignty until a PQ government wins its second mandate. Supports the proposed Quebec Charter of Values and has called for a ban on wearing the niqab and burka in public. (In 2014, in the wake of the PQ's election defeat he was critical of the party's proposed Quebec Charter of Values.)

=== Martine Ouellet ===
Background

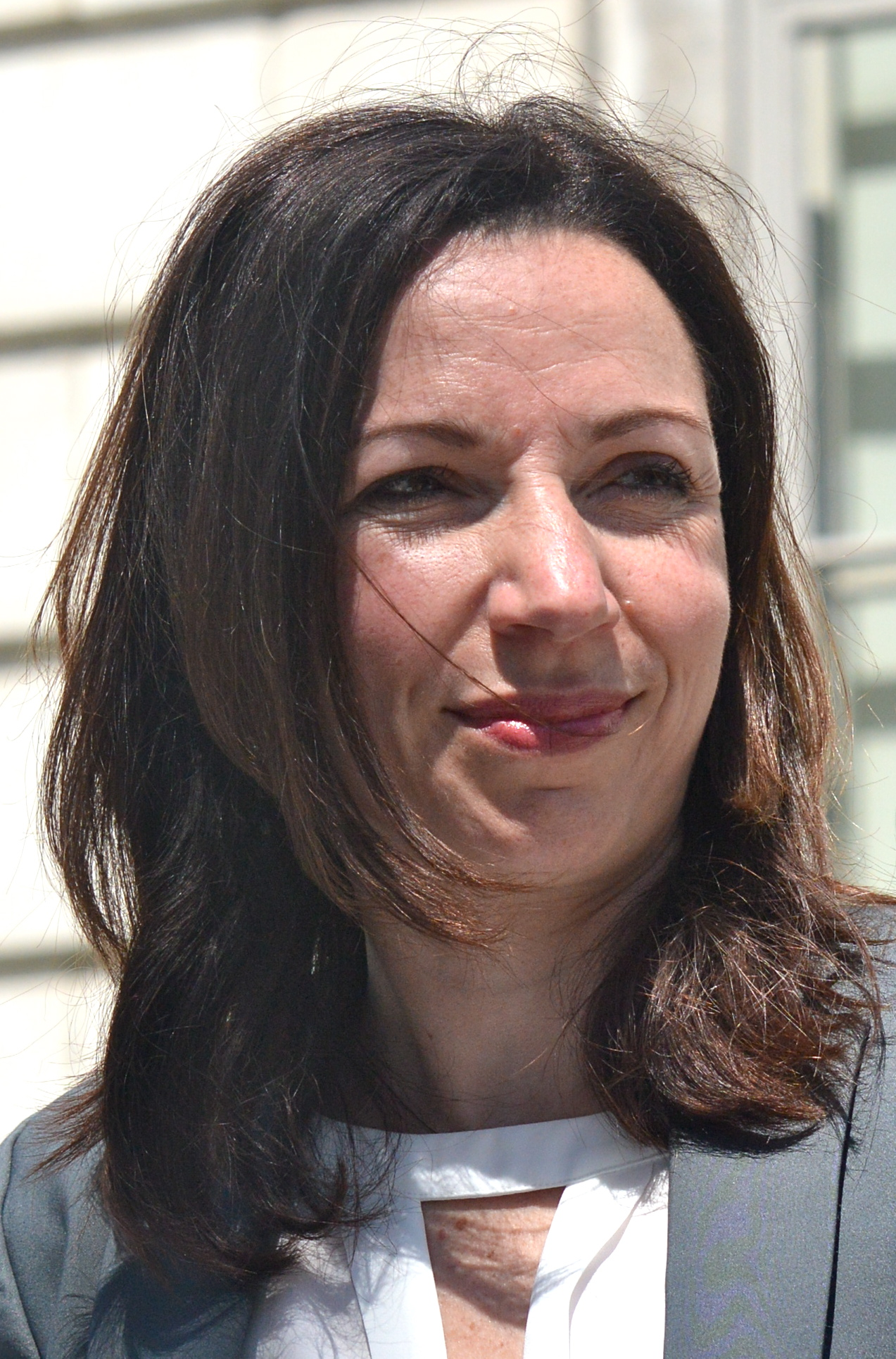
Martine Ouellet, MNA for Vachon

MNA for Vachon (2010–2018), Minister of Natural Resources and Wildlife (2012–2014), third-place finisher in 2015 leadership election. Worked at Hydro-Québec for 20 years as a mechanical engineer prior to entering politics.

Date candidacy declared: May 27, 2016
Supporters
Support from caucus members:
Support from former caucus members: Robert Dean (Prévost), Gilbert Paquette (Rosemont)
Other prominent supporters: Mario Beaulieu, MP for La Pointe-de-l'Île and president of the Bloc Québécois, Xavier Barsalou-Duval, MP for Pierre-Boucher—Les Patriotes—Verchères, Michel Boudrias, MP for Terrebonne, Marilène Gill, MP for Manicouagan
Policies: Promises to hold a referendum on Quebec sovereignty in a first mandate

=== Paul St-Pierre Plamondon ===
Background

39-year-old lawyer, political columnist, essayist and commentator who has never held a seat in the Quebec National Assembly.

Date candidacy declared: June 3, 2016
Supporters
Support from caucus members:
Support from former caucus members:
Other prominent supporters:
Policies: Wishes to revive social democracy and opposes austerity. Opposes holding a referendum on sovereignty during a PQ government's first mandate and would hold public consultations during a second mandate to gauge whether or not the public is interested. Opposes the Quebec Charter of Values proposed by the former PQ government in 2014.

(In his 2020 run, he supported sovereignty referendum in the first mandate, he would also steer the party further into advocating for strict secularism measures)

== Withdrawn candidate ==
=== Véronique Hivon ===
Background

MNA for Joliette (2008–2022), Minister of Social Services and Youth Protection, Minister of the Lanaudière region and Minister responsible for the Die in Dignity commission (2012–2014).

Date candidacy declared: May 9, 2016
Date candidacy withdrawn: August 26, 2016
Supporters
Support from caucus members: (5) Mathieu Traversy (Terrebonne), Claude Cousineau (Bertrand), André Villeneuve (Berthier), Carole Poirier (Hochelaga-Maisonneuve), Sylvain Pagé (Labelle)
Support from former caucus members: (8) Marie Bouillé (Iberville), Gilles Chapadeau (Rouyn-Noranda–Témiscamingue), Linda Goupil (Lévis) former Justice minister, Élizabeth Larouche (Abitibi-Est) former Aboriginal Affairs minister, Scott McKay (Repentigny), Serge Ménard (Laval-des-Rapides) former Public Security minister, Lucie Papineau (Prévost) former Industry and Commerce minister, Cécile Vermette (Marie-Victorin)
Other prominent supporters: Claude DeBellefeuille, former Bloc Québécois MP (Beauharnois—Salaberry), Gabrielle Lemieux, Advisor on the national executive of the PQ, Paul Crête, Vice-President on the national executive of the PQ, Gabriel Ste-Marie, Bloc Québécois MP (Joliette)
Policies: Supports electoral reform and more free votes in the Quebec National Assembly.

== Declined ==
- Jean-Martin Aussant, MNA for Nicolet-Yamaska (2008–2012) as member for the PQ from 2008 until 2011 when he resigned, criticising then leader Pauline Marois for downplaying Quebec sovereignty. Leader of the Option nationale political party (2011–2013), currently executive director of Chantier de l’économie sociale.
- Pierre Céré, spokesperson for the Conseil national des chômeurs, PQ activist and 2014 candidate in Laurier-Dorion.
- Bernard Drainville, MNA for Marie-Victorin (2007–2016), Minister responsible for Democratic Institutions and Active Citizenship (2012–2014) and the main architect and defender of the Quebec Charter of Values.
- Nicolas Marceau, MNA for Rousseau (2009–2018), Minister of Finance (2012–2014).

== Results ==
First round:

- Jean-François Lisée: 25,936 (47.03%)
- Alexandre Cloutier: 16,357 (29.66%)
- Martine Ouellet: 9,077 (16.46%)
- Paul St-Pierre Plamondon: 3,772 (6.84%)

Second round:

- Jean-François Lisée: 27,801 (50.63%)
- Alexandre Cloutier: 17,403 (31.70%)
- Martine Ouellet: 9,702 (17.67%)
  - Total votes: 55,142
  - Turnout: 75.09 per cent

== Opinion polling ==
=== Parti Québécois supporters ===
Polling firm/Link	Last date of polling	Sample size	Margin of error	Alexandre Cloutier	Véronique Hivon	Jean-François Lisée	Martine Ouellet	fr:Paul St-Pierre Plamondon	Other/ Undecided
Léger Marketing	September 29, 2016	991	± 3.1%	31%	—	29%	12%	3%	Don't know 16% None of the above 8% No answer 1%
CROP	September 19, 2016	1,000	—	37%	—	36%	22%	5%	—
Léger Marketing	September 1, 2016	1,006	± 3.1%	39%	—	23%	18%	1%	Don't know 15% None of the above 4%
Léger Marketing	June 8, 2016	990	± 3.1%	37%	14%	15%	7%	2%	Don't know 26%
Léger Marketing	May 5, 2016	1,003	± 3%	27%	11%	6%	4%	—	Don't know 22% Bernard Drainville 15% Jean-Martin Aussant 14% No answer 1%

=== All Quebecers ===
Polling firm/Link	Last date of polling	Sample size	Margin of error	Alexandre Cloutier	Véronique Hivon	Jean-François Lisée	Martine Ouellet	fr:Paul St-Pierre Plamondon	Other/ Undecided
Léger Marketing	September 29, 2016	991	± 3.1%	20%	—	21%	8%	2%	Don't know 27% None of the above 20% No answer 2%
Léger Marketing	September 1, 2016	1,006	± 3.1%	26%	—	16%	10%	1%	Don't know 25% None of the above 20%
Léger Marketing	June 8, 2016	990	± 3.1%	25%	13%	11%	3%	1%	Don't know 43% No answer 4%
Léger Marketing	May 5, 2016	1,003	± 3%	22%	10%	6%	3%	—	Don't know 35% Bernard Drainville 10% Jean-Martin Aussant 9% No answer 4%

== See also ==
- Parti Québécois leadership elections
