= Vincent Marissal =

Canadian politician

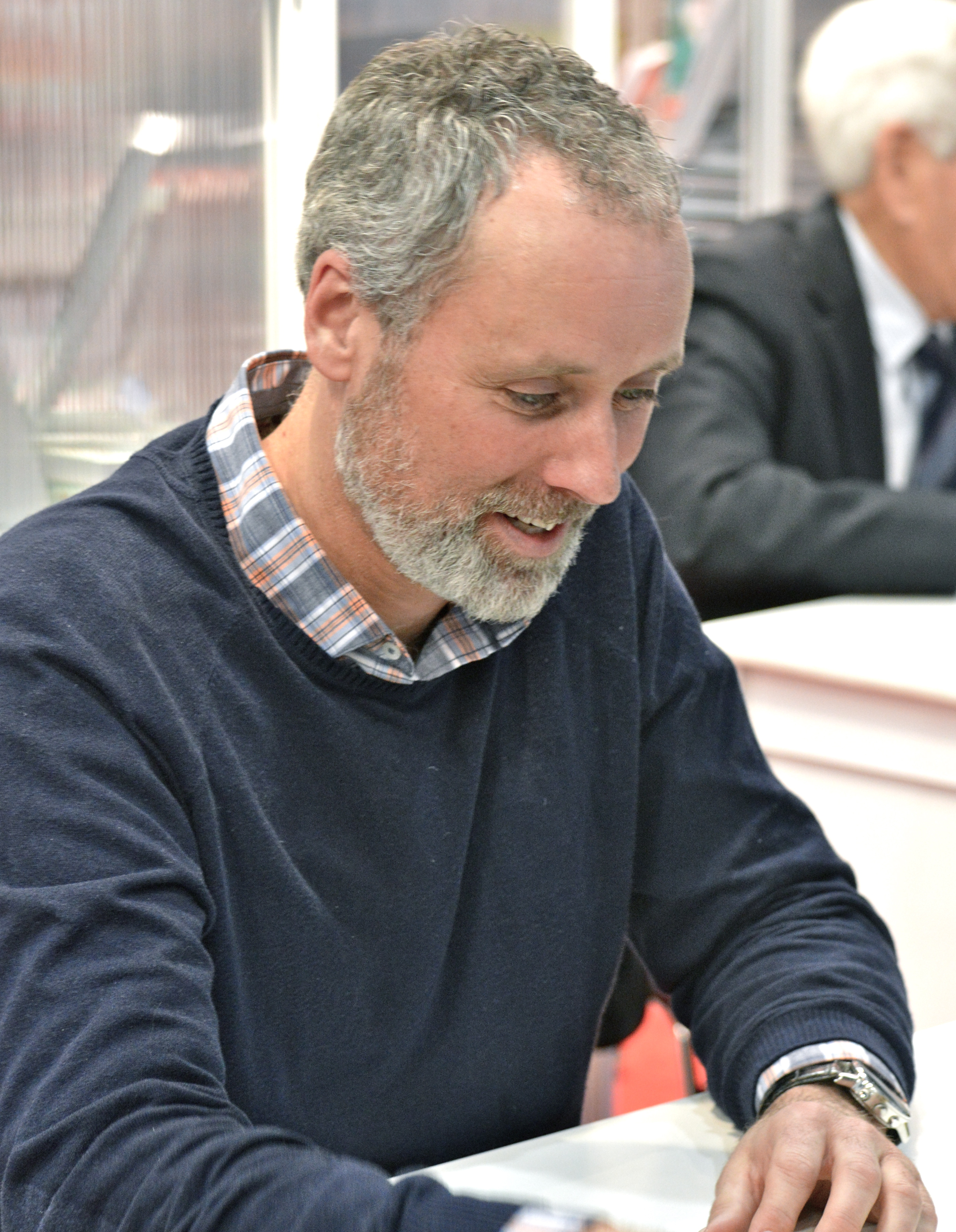

Member of the National Assembly of Quebec for Rosemont
- In office October 18, 2018 – August 27, 2026
- Preceded by: Jean-François Lisée
- Succeeded by: Gisèle Pouhe Njall

Personal details
- Born: November 7, 1966 (age 59) Granby, Quebec
- Party: Independent (2025–2026, since 2026)
- Other political affiliations: Québec solidaire (until 2025); Parti Québécois (August 24, 2026–August 26, 2026)
- Education: Université du Québec à Montréal; Cégep de Granby
- Profession: Journalist

Vincent Marissal is a Canadian politician, who was elected to the National Assembly of Quebec in the 2018 provincial election. He was elected in the provincial riding of Rosemont as a member of Québec solidaire.

In 2025, as his party suspended him from caucus for having discussions with the Parti Québécois about joining their party, he left party to sit as an independent and announced in 2026 that he was not running for re-election and quitting political life. Nevertheless, Parti Québécois leader Paul St-Pierre Plamondon announced three days before the election was called that Marissal would be the party's candidate in Taschereau, a Quebec City riding, but two days later announced Marissal had withdrawn as candidate following potential ethical violations involving the home exchange of his parliamentary-paid housing.

== Biography ==
Prior to being elected, Marissal was a journalist. His journalistic career began with La Voix de l'Est, a newspaper in Granby. Marissal later wrote for Le Soleil in Quebec City, covering the affairs of the National Assembly. He later worked for La Presse in Montreal, where he continued to cover politics while also authoring the newspaper's weekly wine column.

In the 2018 election, as a first-time candidate he ousted PQ leader Jean-François Lisée from its longstanding party stronghold of Rosemont, which, along with the disappointing results for the PQ generally, led to Lisée's resignation as leader. Following the 2022 provincial election, he became the opposition critic for Health; Ethics; the Metropolis; and Sports, Leisure and Outdoors. He considered running for mayor of Montreal in 2025, but decided against it, though leaving the door open for a future run. On 22 November 2025, he announced that he was leaving the party to sit as an independent.

== Electoral record ==
2022 Quebec general election: Rosemont
Party	Candidate	Votes	%	±%
Québec solidaire	Vincent Marissal	13,311	37.62	+2.37
Coalition Avenir Québec	Sandra O'Connor	8,157	23.06	+7.50
Parti Québécois	Pierre-Luc Brillant	7,527	21.27	-7.16
Liberal	Sherlyne Duverneau	4,170	11.79	-4.98
Conservative	Marie-France Lemay	1,605	4.54	+3.95
Green	Jamie D’Souza	452	1.28	-0.14
Climat Québec	Jean-François Racine	158	0.45	–
Total valid votes		35,380	98.87	–
Total rejected ballots		405	1.13	-0.33
Turnout		35,785	68.22	-1.18
Electors on the lists		52,457	–	–

2018 Quebec general election: Rosemont
Party	Candidate	Votes	%	±%
Québec solidaire	Vincent Marissal	12,920	35.25	+16.57
Parti Québécois	Jean-François Lisée	10,420	28.43	-5.84
Liberal	Agata La Rosa	6,148	16.77	-13.19
Coalition Avenir Québec	Sonya Cormier	5703	15.56	+1.40
Green	Karl Dubois	521	1.42	+0.10
New Democratic	Paulina Ayala	314	0.86	
Parti nul	Catherine Raymond-Poirier	225	0.61	
Conservative	Alexandra Liendo	217	0.59	
Bloc Pot	Coralie Laperrière	130	0.35	-0.19
Marxist–Leninist	Stéphane Chénier	55	0.15	-0.06
Total valid votes		36,653	98.54	
Total rejected ballots		542	1.46	
Turnout		37,195	69.40	
Eligible voters		53,596		
Québec solidaire gain from Parti Québécois		Swing		+11.21
Source(s) "Rapport des résultats officiels du scrutin". Élections Québec.
