= Jean-François Lisée =

Canadian politician (born 1958)

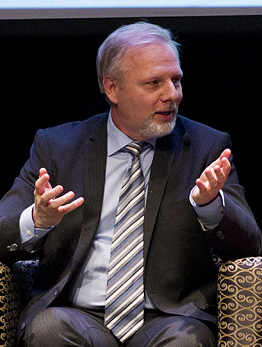
- Lisée in 2013

Leader of the Opposition of Quebec
- In office October 7, 2016 – October 1, 2018
- Preceded by: Sylvain Gaudreault
- Succeeded by: Pierre Arcand

Leader of the Parti Québécois
- In office October 7, 2016 – October 1, 2018
- President: Raymond Archambault; Gabrielle Lemieux
- Preceded by: Sylvain Gaudreault (interim)
- Succeeded by: Pascal Bérubé (interim)

Minister of International Relations and La Francophonie
- In office September 19, 2012 – April 23, 2014
- Premier: Pauline Marois
- Preceded by: Monique Gagnon-Tremblay
- Succeeded by: Christine St-Pierre

Member of the National Assembly of Quebec for Rosemont
- In office September 4, 2012 – October 1, 2018
- Preceded by: Louise Beaudoin
- Succeeded by: Vincent Marissal

Personal details
- Born: February 13, 1958 (age 68) Thetford Mines, Quebec, Canada
- Party: Parti Québécois
- Education: Université de Montréal
- Profession: Politician

Jean-François Lisée (French pronunciation: [ʒɑ̃ fʁã.swa li.ze]; born February 13, 1958) is a Canadian politician who served as the leader of the Parti Québécois from October 2016 until October 2018. He was first elected a member of the National Assembly of Quebec in the 2012 Quebec election in the electoral district of Rosemont.

Prior to winning political office, he was a political analyst, journalist, author, intellectual and sovereignist thinker. He was a "special advisor" to former PQ premiers of Quebec Jacques Parizeau and Lucien Bouchard.

== Biography ==
Lisée is the son of Andrée Goulet of Thetford Mines.

Lisée holds a licentiate in laws from the Université de Montréal, a master in communication studies from the UQAM and a degree in journalism from the Centre de formation des journalistes in Paris. In the 1980s, he was a reporter in Paris and Washington for both Canadian and French media. During that decade, he began an expansive investigation into 30 years of American political, diplomatic, financial and media attention toward Quebec and its independence movement, resulting in the book In the Eye of the Eagle, published in 1990. It won the Governor General's Award for non-fiction. Two books followed: Le Tricheur ("The Cheater") and Le Naufrageur ("The Wrecker"), both of which were highly critical of former Quebec Premier Robert Bourassa. According to Lisée, Bourassa's refusal to support sovereignty after making a turn toward Quebec nationalism after the failure of the Meech Lake Accord left many sovereignists feeling betrayed. Bourassa was outraged by the title of the first book and never spoke to Lisée again.

In 1994, he became a "special advisor" to nationalist Premier Jacques Parizeau and an important strategist for the 1995 Quebec referendum campaign. After the sovereignty referendum failure and Parizeau's resulting resignation, Lisée then became advisor to Parizeau's successor, Lucien Bouchard. Lisée resigned from this post in late 1999 because of disagreements over the sovereignty strategy of the provincial PQ government. He explained his own strategy in Emergency Exit: How to Avert Quebec Decline (2000).

Lisée was guest scholar from 2001 to 2003 at the International Research and Study Centre (CERI) in Paris and at the Political Science Department of the University of Montreal. He was the Executive Director of the International Studies Centre at the University of Montreal (CERIUM) from 2004 to 2012. He is also a member of the Political Research and Social Development Centre (CPDS) and founder of international politics website PolitiquesSociales.net. He periodically writes articles published in the current affairs magazine L'actualité.Prior to his election he was the executive director of the International Study and Research Centre at the University of Montreal. His work centred on Quebec sovereignty, the sociological phenomena affecting the latter's support, as well as the "Quebec Model" and social democracy in an era of globalization. He alongside Mathieu Bock-Côté are cited for influencing the PQ from moving away from their history of inclusivity of René Lévesque towards identity nationalism.

He served concurrently as the Minister of International Relations, the Francophonie, External Trade as well as the minister responsible for the Montreal region in the cabinet of Pauline Marois from 2012 to 2014. Future Quebec premier Christine Fréchette was his deputy chief of staff.

Lisée formally entered the Parti Québécois leadership election in May 2016, saying he would not campaign for sovereignty in his first mandate as premier. He was elected leader of the PQ on October 7, winning 50.63% of the ballots during the second round.

He resigned as Parti Québécois leader after his party's tied third-place result in the 2018 election, in which he lost his own seat in Rosemont to Vincent Marissal.

== Controversy ==
In 2016, while he was running for leadership of the PQ, Lisée stated that if elected Premier of Quebec, he would ban Muslim veils in public spaces and claimed that Muslim women could hide machine guns under their burkas.

In September 26, 2016, Lisée stated that Quebec needed the "best immigration possible" and named Spain, France, and Belgium as examples of sources of potential immigrants. Many thought that because those were well-developed countries, Lisée felt that they could integrate into Quebec's society more easily. Fellow PQ member Maka Kotto, an immigrant from Cameroon, criticized Lisée's comments.

In 2018, Lisée said he wanted a fence to be built near a Quebec-New York border crossing that is popular with asylum-seekers.

== Bibliography ==
- Lévesque/Trudeau: leur révolution tranquille, notre histoire. 2026. Montréal: La boîte à Lisée: Les Éditions Carte Blanche. ISBN 9782895904809
- Lévesque/Trudeau: leur jeunesse, notre histoire. 2025. Montréal: La boîte à Lisée: Les Éditions Carte Blanche. ISBN 9782895904670
- Qui veut la peau du Parti québécois? et autres secrets de la politique et des médias. 2019. Montréal: La boîte à Lisée: Carte blanche. ISBN 9782895903659
- Octobre 1995 – Tous les espoirs, tous les chagrins. 2015. Montréal: Les éditions Québec-Amérique. ISBN 9782764430408
- Le Journal de Lisée: 18 mois de pouvoir, mes combats, mes passions. 2014. Montréal: Les Éditions Rogers. ISBN 9780888967107
- Comment mettre la droite K.-O. en 15 arguments. 2012. Montréal: Les Éditions Stanké. ISBN 9782760410985
- Des histoires du Québec selon Jean-François Lisée. 2012. Montréal: Les Éditions Rogers
- Le petit tricheur: Robert Bourassa derrière le masque. 2012. Montréal: Les Éditions Québec-Amérique. ISBN 9782764421703
- Comment mettre la droite K.-O. en 15 arguments. 2012. Montréal: Les Éditions Stanké. ISBN 9782760410985
- Troisième millénaire. 2011. Montréal: Les Éditions Stanké. ISBN 9782760410855
- Imaginer l'Après-crise: Pistes pour un monde plus juste, équitable, durable. 2009. Montréal: Les Éditions du Boréal. ISBN 9782764607015
- Pour une gauche efficace. 2008. Montréal: Les Éditions du Boréal. ISBN 9782764606407
- Nous. 2007. Montréal: Les Éditions du Boréal. ISBN 9782764605677
- Sortie de Secours: Comment échapper au déclin du Québec. 2000. Montréal: Les Éditions du Boréal. ISBN 9782764600160
- Le Naufrageur. 1994. Montréal: Les Éditions du Boréal. ISBN 9782890526280
- Le Tricheur. 1994. Montréal: Les Éditions du Boréal. ISBN 9782890526211
- Les Prétendants. 1993. Montréal: Les Éditions du Boréal. ISBN 9782890525832
- Carrefours Amérique. 1990. Montréal: Les Éditions du Boréal. ISBN 9782890523647
- Dans l'œil de l'Aigle. 1990. Montréal: Les Éditions du Boréal. ISBN 9782890523289

== Awards ==
- Governor General's Award (1990)
- Jules-Fournier Award (1990)

== Electoral record ==
2018 Quebec general election: Rosemont
| Party | Candidate | Votes | % | ±% |
|---|---|---|---|---|
| Québec solidaire | Vincent Marissal | 12,920 | 35.25 | +16.57 |
| Parti Québécois | Jean-François Lisée | 10,420 | 28.43 | -5.84 |
| Liberal | Agata La Rosa | 6,148 | 16.77 | -13.19 |
| Coalition Avenir Québec | Sonya Cormier | 5703 | 15.56 | +1.40 |
| Green | Karl Dubois | 521 | 1.42 | +0.10 |
| New Democratic | Paulina Ayala | 314 | 0.86 | |
| Parti nul | Catherine Raymond-Poirier | 225 | 0.61 | |
| Conservative | Alexandra Liendo | 217 | 0.59 | |
| Bloc Pot | Coralie Laperrière | 130 | 0.35 | -0.19 |
| Marxist–Leninist | Stéphane Chénier | 55 | 0.15 | -0.06 |
| Total valid votes | | 36,653 | 98.54 | |
| Total rejected ballots | | 542 | 1.46 | |
| Turnout | | 37,195 | 69.40 | |
| Eligible voters | | 53,596 | | |
| Québec solidaire gain from Parti Québécois | | Swing | | +11.21 |
Source(s) "Rapport des résultats officiels du scrutin". Élections Québec.

2014 Quebec general election
| Party | Candidate | Votes | % | ±% |
|---|---|---|---|---|
| Parti Québécois | Jean-François Lisée | 12,712 | 34.27 | -9.40 |
| Liberal | Thiery Valade | 11,114 | 29.96 | +9.57 |
| Québec solidaire | Jean Trudelle | 6,930 | 18.68 | +4.20 |
| Coalition Avenir Québec | Carl Dubois | 5,252 | 14.16 | -3.17 |
| Green | Ksenia Svetoushkina | 488 | 1.32 | – |
| Option nationale | Sophie-Geneviève Labelle | 321 | 0.87 | -1.94 |
| Bloc Pot | Matthew Babin | 200 | 0.54 | -0.03 |
| Marxist–Leninist | Stéphane Chénier | 78 | 0.21 | -0.12 |
| Total valid votes | | 37,095 | 98.51 | – |
| Total rejected ballots | | 560 | 1.49 | – |
| Turnout | | 37,655 | 72.67 | -3.43 |
| Electors on the lists | | 51,819 | – | – |
| Parti Québécois hold | | Swing | | -9.40 |
Source: Official Results, Le Directeur général des élections du Québec.

2012 Quebec general election: Rosemont
| Party | Candidate | Votes | % | ±% |
|---|---|---|---|---|
| Parti Québécois | Jean-François Lisée | 16,780 | 43.67 | −6.99 |
| Liberal | Madwa-Nika Phanord-Cadet | 7,836 | 20.39 | −11.42 |
| Coalition Avenir Québec | Léo Fradette | 6,657 | 17.33 | +11.03 |
| Québec solidaire | François Saillant | 5,564 | 14.48 | +6.26 |
| Option nationale | Johanne Lavoie | 1,079 | 2.81 | – |
| Bloc Pot | Raynald St-Onge | 220 | 0.57 | – |
| Coalition pour la constituante | Daniel Guersan | 160 | 0.42 | – |
| Marxist–Leninist | Stéphane Chénier | 127 | 0.33 | +0.04 |
| Total valid votes | | 38,423 | 98.85 | – |
| Total rejected ballots | | 446 | 1.15 | – |
| Turnout | | 38,869 | 76.10 | +17.43 |
| Electors | | 51,073 | – | – |
| Parti Québécois hold | | Swing | | −9.21 |
Source: Official Results, Le Directeur général des élections du Québec. The CAQ percentage change totals are compared to the Action démocratique du Québec results from 2008.

== See also ==
- List of Université de Montréal people
- Quebec sovereignty movement
- Social democracy
- Parti Québécois
