= Guy Rivard =

Canadian politician (1936–2025)

Member of the National Assembly of Quebec for Rosemont
- In office December 2, 1985 – September 12, 1994
- Preceded by: Gilbert Paquette
- Succeeded by: Rita Dionne-Marsolais

Personal details
- Born: August 1, 1936 Trois-Rivières, Quebec, Canada
- Died: August 14, 2025 (aged 89) Montreal, Quebec, Canada
- Party: Liberal
- Education: Collège Jean-de-Brébeuf; Université de Montréal; Yale University; Harvard Business School
- Occupation: Pediatrician, public administrator, politician

Guy Rivard (August 1, 1936 – August 14, 2025) was a Canadian politician in the province of Quebec. Rivard served in the National Assembly of Quebec from 1985 to 1994 as a member of the Liberal Party and was a junior minister in the government of Robert Bourassa. His handling of Quebec's language laws in 1989 attracted national attention.

== Early life and career ==
Rivard was born in Trois-Rivières and received his early education in that city. He attended the Collège Jean-de-Brébeuf from 1952 to 1956 and earned a medical degree at the Université de Montréal between 1956 and 1961. He specialized in pediatrics in Montreal and later trained in respiratory illnesses at Yale University from 1964 to 1967. In 1977, he received a diploma from the Executive Program for Health Systems Management at the Harvard Business School.

Rivard was a pediatrician at the Hopital Sainte-Justine in Montreal from 1967 to 1976 and was its director of professional services from 1976 to 1980. He also worked in various capacities at the Université de Montréal from 1967 to 1982, when he entered public administration as the deputy minister for Social Affairs in the Government of Quebec. After serving in this capacity for two years, he returned to academia in 1984-85.

== Political career ==
Rivard was elected to the National Assembly of Quebec in the 1985 provincial election, winning in the Montreal division of Rosemont. The Liberals won a majority government in this election, and Rivard entered the legislature as a backbench supporter of Robert Bourassa's government. On March 31, 1988, he was appointed minister responsible for Cultural Affairs and minister responsible for French language legislation.

This appointment came at a time when linguistic tensions were increasing in Quebec, and The Globe and Mail newspaper described his new position as "the hottest political seat in the province." Rivard called himself an "honest broker" and indicated that he wanted to act "like a mediator, a gatherer of various groups." He spoke before the anglophone lobby Alliance Quebec in May 1988, calling for greater cooperation among francophone and anglophone Quebecers.

Most of the controversy surrounding Quebec's language laws in this period was focused on the Charter of the French Language, popularly known as Bill 101. This legislation was enacted by the Parti Québécois government of René Lévesque in 1977, and one of its more controversial provisions was a restriction on the use of languages other than French on commercial signs. In December 1988, the Supreme Court of Canada struck down three sections of the law as violating the provisions for freedom of expression set out in the Constitution of Canada. The Quebec government responded by amending the legislation to prohibit languages other than French on outdoor commercial and public signs while permitting indoor signs to be bilingual or multilingual provided the French text was dominant. This decision met with opposition from both the anglophone and francophone communities: three anglophone cabinet ministers resigned from the Bourassa government in protest, while the opposition Parti Québécois attacked the allowance of indoor bilingual signs as an assault on the French language. Under the new legislation, Rivard was given ministerial responsibility for determining regulations to enforce the language law. This was previously the responsibility of the Office de la Langue Francaise, a semi-independent body appointed by the government.

Rivard's handling of the language legislation was criticized in some circles, and a Toronto Star article in February 1989 described him as "inexperienced, easily flustered, naive, a trifle pedantic" and "the kind of cabinet minister that a hungry opposition dreams about." On March 3, Rivard was reassigned to the lower-profile position of minister responsible for Technology while cabinet heavyweight Claude Ryan took responsibility for language.

Rivard was narrowly re-elected in the 1989 provincial election, defeating Parti Québécois challenger Sylvain Simard by only 133 votes. On October 11, he was reassigned again as Minister responsible for the Francophonie. He represented Quebec at the first inauguration of Jean-Bertrand Aristide as president of Haiti in 1991. In the same year, he expressed skepticism about Canadian Prime Minister Brian Mulroney's plans to link foreign aid to human rights. While affirming that Quebec would assist countries moving toward democracy, he also said that countries with dubious human rights records should not be cut off entirely. Rivard received additional responsibility as minister responsible for International Affairs on May 27, 1992.

Robert Bourassa announced his retirement as Premier of Quebec and Liberal Party leader in 1993, and Rivard supported Daniel Johnson's successful campaign to become Bourassa's successor. Rivard later announced that he would not seek re-election to the legislature, and he stepped down from cabinet when Johnson became premier on January 11, 1994.

== After politics ==
Rivard was the founding president of the firm BioTransTech and was president of the Groupe Santé International from 1994 to 2003. He was also a health consultant and administrator from 1999 to 2005, when he retired. He was appointed to the board of the Centre de santé et de services sociaux du Sud-Ouest-Verdun in 2006, and also served as vice-president of the Association internationale des familles Rivard.

Rivard died on August 14, 2025, at the age of 89.

== Electoral record ==
1989 Quebec general election: Rosemont
Party	Candidate	Votes	%
Liberal	Guy Rivard (incumbent)	13,121	46.97
Parti Québécois	Sylvain Simard	12,988	46.50
New Democratic	Pierre Dion	620	2.22
Progressive Conservative	Lyse T. Giguère	298	1.07
Parti indépendantiste	Richard Belleau	278	1.00
Workers	Régis Beaulieu	256	0.92
Commonwealth of Canada	Normand Bélanger	134	0.48
United Social Credit	Jean-Paul Poulin	92	0.33
Marxist–Leninist	France Tremblay	79	0.28
Socialist Movement	Jean-Yves Desgagnés	67	0.24
Total valid votes		27,933	
Rejected and declined votes		862	
Turnout		28,795	75.65
Electors on the lists		38,064	
Source: Official Results, Le Directeur général des élections du Québec.

1985 Quebec general election: Rosemont
Party	Candidate	Votes	%
Liberal	Guy Rivard	14,810	52.65
Parti Québécois	Lise Denis	11,745	41.75
New Democratic	Roger Lamarre	742	2.64
Parti indépendantiste	Louise Brouillet	394	1.40
Humanist	Sylvie Lepage	183	0.65
United Social Credit	Jean-Paul Poulin	104	0.37
Communist	Claude Demers	83	0.30
Commonwealth of Canada	Louis Julien	43	0.15
Christian Socialist	Carlos Zencovich	27	0.10
Total valid votes		28,131	
Rejected and declined votes		485	
Turnout		28,616	75.11
Electors on the lists		38,101	
