= Rosemont (provincial electoral district) =

Provincial electoral district in Quebec, Canada

Coordinates: 45°33′45″N 73°34′15″W

Quebec electoral district
- Location in Montreal

Provincial electoral district
- Legislature: National Assembly of Quebec
MNA
Gisèle Pouhe Njall
Québec solidaire
- District created: 1972
- First contested: 1973
- Last contested: 2026

Demographics
- Population (2011): 71,885
- Electors (2014): 51,819
- Area (km²): 9.7
- Pop. density (per km²): 7,410.8
- Census division: Montreal (part)
- Census subdivision: Montreal (part)

Rosemont (French pronunciation: [ʁozmɔ̃]) is a provincial electoral district in the Montreal region of Quebec, Canada, that elects members to the National Assembly of Quebec. It consists of part of the Rosemont–La Petite-Patrie borough of the city of Montreal.

It was created for the 1973 election from parts of Gouin and Jeanne-Mance electoral districts.

In the change from the 2001 to the 2011 electoral map, its territory was unchanged.

== Members of the National Assembly ==
Legislature	Years	Member	Party
Riding created from Gouin and Jeanne-Mance
30th	1973–1976	Gilles Bellemare	Liberal
31st	1976–1981	Gilbert Paquette	Parti Québécois
32nd	1981–1985	Gilbert Paquette	Parti Québécois
32nd	1985–1985	Gilbert Paquette	Independent
33rd	1985–1989	Guy Rivard	Liberal
34th	1989–1994	Guy Rivard	Liberal
35th	1994–1998	Rita Dionne-Marsolais	Parti Québécois
36th	1998–2003	Rita Dionne-Marsolais	Parti Québécois
37th	2003–2007	Rita Dionne-Marsolais	Parti Québécois
38th	2007–2008	Rita Dionne-Marsolais	Parti Québécois
39th	2008–2011	Louise Beaudoin	Parti Québécois
39th	2011–2012	Louise Beaudoin	Independent
39th	2012–2012	Louise Beaudoin	Parti Québécois
40th	2012–2014	Jean-François Lisée	Parti Québécois
41st	2014–2018	Jean-François Lisée	Parti Québécois
42nd	2018–2022	Vincent Marissal	Québec solidaire
43rd	2022–2025	Vincent Marissal	Québec solidaire
43rd	2025–2026	Vincent Marissal	Independent
44th	2026–Present	Gisèle Pouhe Njall	Québec solidaire

== Election results ==
2026 Quebec general election
** Preliminary results — Not yet official **
Party	Candidate	Votes	%	±%
Québec solidaire	Gisèle Pouhe Njall	14,168	39.22	
Parti Québécois	Pierre-Luc Brillant	10,086	27.92	
Liberal	David Lavoie	7,177	19.87	
Coalition Avenir Québec	Nour Aliyah Attié	2,468	6.83	
Conservative	Mildred Mathieu	1,871	5.18	
Climat Québec	Thierry Paquin	224	0.62	
Independent	Jean Duval	134	0.37	
Total valid votes				
Total rejected ballots				
Turnout			70.19	
Electors on the lists			–	–
Québec solidaire hold		Swing		
Source: Élections Québec

2022 Quebec general election
Party	Candidate	Votes	%	±%
Québec solidaire	Vincent Marissal	13,311	37.62	+2.37
Coalition Avenir Québec	Sandra O'Connor	8,157	23.06	+7.50
Parti Québécois	Pierre-Luc Brillant	7,527	21.27	-7.16
Liberal	Sherlyne Duverneau	4,170	11.79	-4.98
Conservative	Marie-France Lemay	1,605	4.54	+3.95
Green	Jamie D’Souza	452	1.28	-0.14
Climat Québec	Jean-François Racine	158	0.45	–
Total valid votes		35,380	98.87	–
Total rejected ballots		405	1.13	-0.33
Turnout		35,785	68.22	-1.18
Electors on the lists		52,457	–	–

2018 Quebec general election
Party	Candidate	Votes	%	±%
Québec solidaire	Vincent Marissal	12,920	35.25	+16.57
Parti Québécois	Jean-François Lisée	10,420	28.43	-5.84
Liberal	Agata La Rosa	6,148	16.77	-13.19
Coalition Avenir Québec	Sonya Cormier	5703	15.56	+1.40
Green	Karl Dubois	521	1.42	+0.10
New Democratic	Paulina Ayala	314	0.86	
Parti nul	Catherine Raymond-Poirier	225	0.61	
Conservative	Alexandra Liendo	217	0.59	
Bloc Pot	Coralie Laperrière	130	0.35	-0.19
Marxist–Leninist	Stéphane Chénier	55	0.15	-0.06
Total valid votes		36,653	98.54	
Total rejected ballots		542	1.46	
Turnout		37,195	69.40	
Eligible voters		53,596		
Québec solidaire gain from Parti Québécois		Swing		+11.21
Source(s) "Rapport des résultats officiels du scrutin". Élections Québec.

2014 Quebec general election
Party	Candidate	Votes	%	±%
Parti Québécois	Jean-François Lisée	12,712	34.27	-9.40
Liberal	Thiery Valade	11,114	29.96	+9.57
Québec solidaire	Jean Trudelle	6,930	18.68	+4.20
Coalition Avenir Québec	Carl Dubois	5,252	14.16	-3.17
Green	Ksenia Svetoushkina	488	1.32	–
Option nationale	Sophie-Geneviève Labelle	321	0.87	-1.94
Bloc Pot	Matthew Babin	200	0.54	-0.03
Marxist–Leninist	Stéphane Chénier	78	0.21	-0.12
Total valid votes		37,095	98.51	–
Total rejected ballots		560	1.49	–
Turnout		37,655	72.67	-3.43
Electors on the lists		51,819	–	–

2012 Quebec general election
Party	Candidate	Votes	%	±%
Parti Québécois	Jean-François Lisée	16,780	43.67	−6.99
Liberal	Madwa-Nika Phanord-Cadet	7,836	20.39	−11.42
Coalition Avenir Québec	Léo Fradette	6,657	17.33	+11.03
Québec solidaire	François Saillant	5,564	14.48	+6.26
Option nationale	Johanne Lavoie	1,079	2.81	–
Bloc Pot	Raynald St-Onge	220	0.57	–
Coalition pour la constituante	Daniel Guersan	160	0.42	–
Marxist–Leninist	Stéphane Chénier	127	0.33	+0.04
Total valid votes		38,423	98.85	–
Total rejected ballots		446	1.15	–
Turnout		38,869	76.10	+17.43
Electors		51,073	–	–
Parti Québécois hold		Swing		−9.21
Source: Official Results, Le Directeur général des élections du Québec. The CAQ percentage change totals are compared to the Action démocratique du Québec results from 2008.

2008 Quebec general election
Party	Candidate	Votes	%	±%
Parti Québécois	Louise Beaudoin	15,220	50.66	+12.06
Liberal	Nathalie Rivard	9,557	31.81	+4.60
Québec solidaire	François Saillant	2,470	8.22	−1.15
Action démocratique	Audrey Férec	1,891	6.29	−12.64
Green	Sylvain Valiquette	816	2.72	−2.55
Marxist–Leninist	Stéphane Chénier	88	0.29	+0.07
Total valid votes		30,042	98.66	–
Total rejected ballots		408	1.34	–
Turnout		30,450	58.67	−12.19
Electors		51,903	–	–
Source: Official Results, Le Directeur général des élections du Québec.

2007 Quebec general election
Party	Candidate	Votes	%	±%
Parti Québécois	Rita Dionne-Marsolais	14,146	38.60	-5.17
Liberal	Yasmine Alloul	9,971	27.21	-12.70
Action démocratique	L. Thierry Bernard	6,936	18.93	+7.41
Québec solidaire	Francois Saillant	3,433	9.37	+6.30*
Green	Marc-André Gadoury	1,931	5.27	–
Bloc Pot	Raphaël Turbide	149	0.41	-0.93
Marxist–Leninist	Garnet Colly	82	0.22	–
Total valid votes		36,648	98.92	–
Total rejected ballots		399	1.08	–
Turnout		37,047	70.86	-0.46
Electors on the lists		52,279	–	–

* Result compared to UFP

== See also ==
- List of Quebec provincial electoral districts
- Canadian provincial electoral districts
