= Parti Québécois =

Sovereignist political party in Quebec, Canada

- Abbreviation: PQ
- Leader: Paul St-Pierre Plamondon
- President: Jerry Beaudoin
- Founders: René Lévesque; Gilles Grégoire
- Founded: 11 October 1968; 58 years ago
- Merger of: Mouvement Souveraineté-Association; Ralliement national; Rassemblement pour l'Indépendance Nationale
- Headquarters: 1200, avenue Papineau; Suite 150; Montreal, Quebec; H2K 4R5
- Membership (2026): 40,000
- Ideology: Quebec nationalism; Quebec sovereigntism; Social democracy; Economic nationalism
- Political position: Centre-left or big tent
- International affiliation: COPPPAL (observer)
- Colours: Blue
- National Assembly: 60 / 127

Website
- pq.org

The Parti Québécois (Note: Pronounced /ˈpɑːrti ˌkɛbəˈkwɑː/ PART-ee KEB-ə-KWAH; Canadian French: [paʁti kebekwa], lit. 'Québécois Party'.) (PQ) is a sovereigntist and social democratic provincial political party in Quebec, Canada. The PQ advocates national sovereignty for Quebec involving independence of the province of Quebec from Canada and establishing a sovereign state. The PQ has also promoted the possibility of maintaining a loose political and economic sovereignty-association between Quebec and Canada. The party traditionally has support from the labour movement; however, unlike most other social democratic parties, its ties with organized labour are informal. Members and supporters of the party are nicknamed péquistes, (Note: Pronounced /peɪˈkiːst/ pay-KEEST; Canadian French: [peˈkɪst].) a French word derived from the pronunciation of the party's initials.

The party is an associate member of COPPPAL. The party has strong informal ties to the Bloc Québécois, the federal party that has also advocated for the secession of Quebec from Canada, but the two are not linked organizationally. As with its federal counterpart, the Parti Québécois has been supported by a wide range of voters in Quebec, from large sections of organized labour to more conservative rural voters.

Throughout its history, the PQ has generally advocated for progressive, centre-left policies. However, as a political formation designed first and foremost to bring together sovereigntists, the PQ has sometimes leaned further to the right or to the left depending on the leader of the time and the political climate. Under the current leader, Paul St-Pierre Plamondon, the party has remained broadly centre-left, but has notably adopted stances such as lowering immigration and reducing government spending.

== History ==
The PQ was the result of the 1968 merger between the Mouvement Souveraineté-Association, founded by René Lévesque (a former Quebec Liberal Party cabinet minister), and the Ralliement national. Following the creation of the PQ, the Rassemblement pour l'Indépendance Nationale held a general assembly that voted to dissolve the RIN. Its former members were invited to join the new Parti Québécois.

The PQ's primary goals were to obtain political, economic and social autonomy for the province of Quebec. Lévesque introduced the strategy of referendums early in the 1970s.

=== Lévesque and first government ===
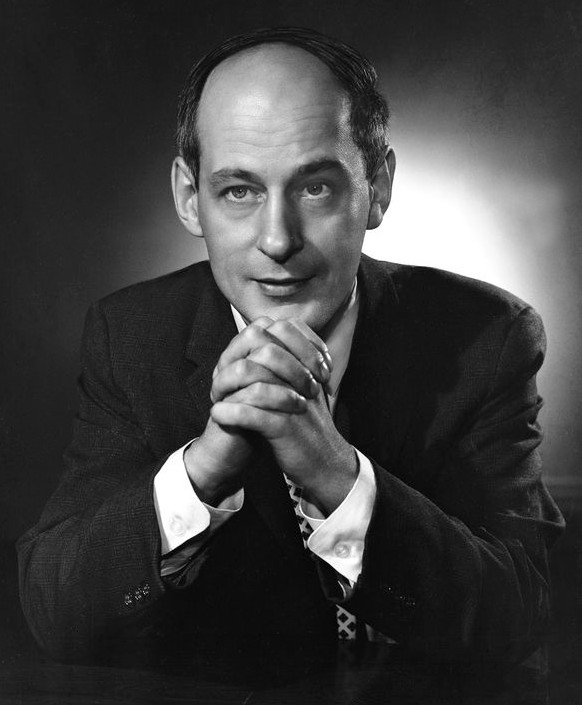
Premier Lévesque.

The PQ faced its first electoral test in the 1970 provincial election, winning seven seats. However, Lévesque was unable to get into the renamed National Assembly. Although it lost one seat in 1973, the decimation of the other parties, particularly the Union Nationale, allowed it to become the official opposition even though Lévesque was still unable to win a seat.

In the 1976 provincial election, the Parti Québécois won government for the first time and took 71 of the 110 seats available. Lévesque became the Premier of Quebec. This provided cause for celebration among many French-speaking Quebecers, while it resulted in an acceleration of the migration of the province's Anglophone population and related economic activity toward Toronto.

The first PQ government was known as the "republic of professors" because of the large number of scholars in Lévesque's cabinet. The PQ was the first government to recognize the rights of Aboriginal peoples to self-determination, insofar as this self-determination did not affect the territorial integrity of Quebec. The PQ passed laws on public consultations and the financing of political parties, which ensured equal financing of political parties and limited contributions by individuals to $3000. However, the most prominent legacy of the PQ is the Charter of the French Language (Bill 101), a framework law which defines the linguistic primacy of French and seeks to make French the common public language of Quebec. It allowed the advancement of francophones towards management roles, until then largely out of their reach. Despite the fact that 85% of the population spoke French and most of them did not understand English, the language of management was English in most medium and large businesses. Critics, both Francophone and Anglophone, have however criticized the charter for restraining citizens' linguistic school choice, as it only permits anglophones to attend English-language schools funded by the state (private schools remained an option for those who could afford tuition). The Parti Québécois initiated the 1980 Quebec referendum seeking a mandate to begin negotiation for sovereignty-association. It was rejected by 60 per cent of voters.

The party was re-elected in the 1981 election. However, in November 1984, it experienced the most severe internal crisis of its existence. Lévesque wanted to focus on governing Quebec rather than sovereignty, and also wanted to adopt a more conciliatory approach on constitutional issues. This angered the more ardent sovereigntists, known as the purs et durs. Lévesque was forced to resign as a result. In September 1985, the party leadership election chose Pierre-Marc Johnson as his successor.

Despite its social democratic past, the PQ failed to gain admission into the Socialist International, after the membership application was vetoed by the federal New Democratic Party.

The PQ led by Johnson was defeated by the Quebec Liberal Party in the 1985 election that saw Robert Bourassa return as premier. The Liberals served in office for two terms and attempted to negotiate a constitutional settlement with the rest of Canada but with the failure of the Meech Lake Accord and the Charlottetown Accord, two packages of proposed amendments to the Canadian constitution, the question of Quebec's status remained unresolved and the Quebec sovereignty movement revived.

=== Return to power under Parizeau ===
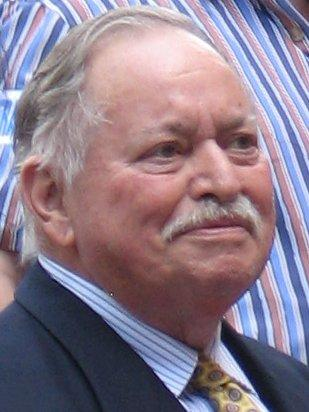
Premier Parizeau.

The PQ returned to power under the leadership of hardline sovereigntist Jacques Parizeau in the 1994 Quebec election. This saw the PQ win 77 seats and 44% of the vote, on a promise to hold an independence referendum within a year. The following year, Parizeau called the 1995 Quebec referendum proposing negotiations on sovereignty. Again, the sovereigntists lost the vote. The final count showed 49.42% of voters supported negotiations that could eventually lead to sovereignty. On the night of the defeat, an emotionally drained Premier Parizeau stated that the loss was caused by "money and ethnic votes" (which led to accusations that Parizeau was racist) as well as by the divided votes amongst francophones. Parizeau resigned the next day (as he is alleged to have planned in case of a defeat).

=== Bouchard government ===
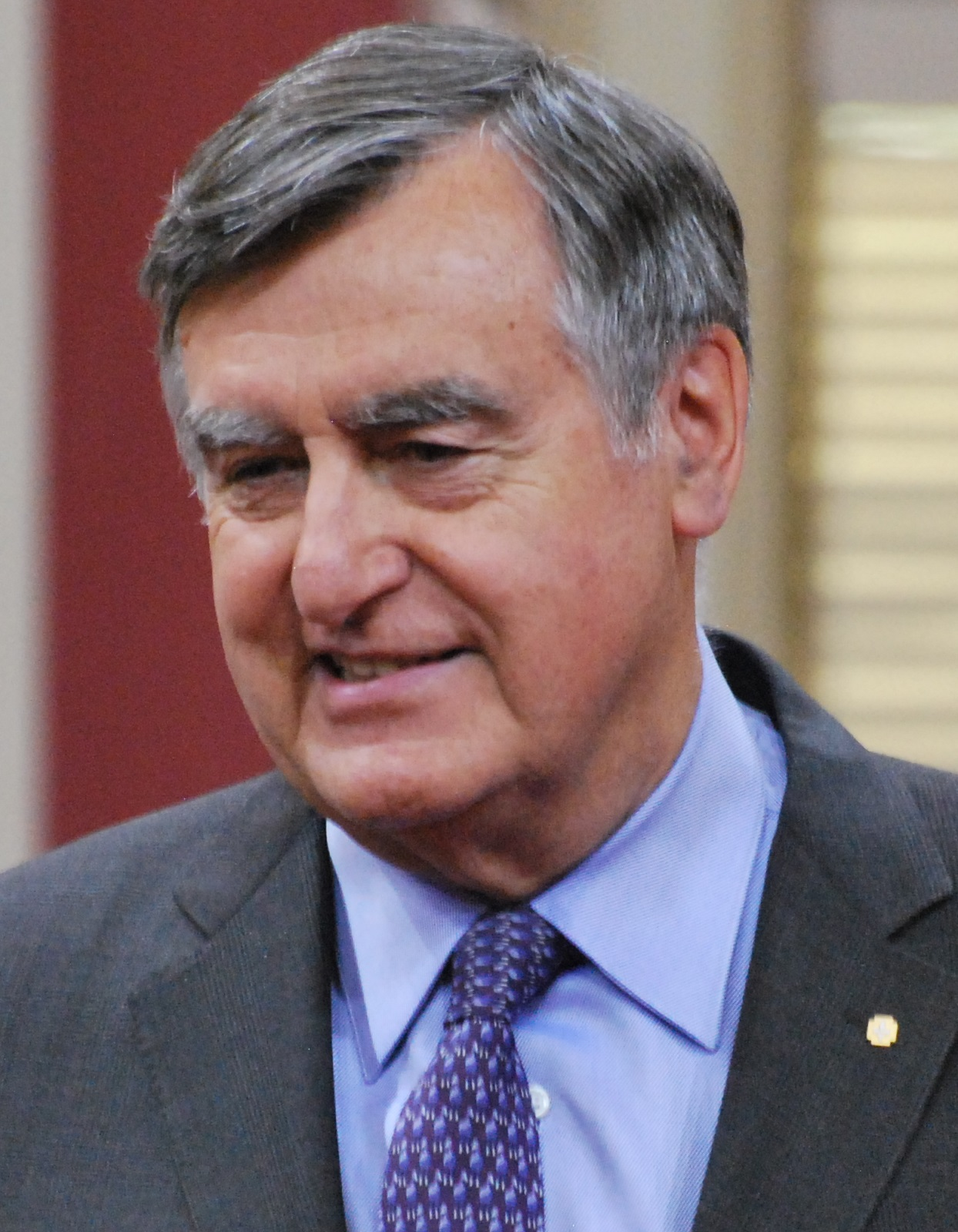
Premier Bouchard.

Lucien Bouchard, a former member of Prime Minister Brian Mulroney's Cabinet and later founder of the Bloc Québécois, a federal-level sovereigntist party, succeeded Parizeau as PQ leader, but chose not to call another referendum due to the absence of "winning conditions". Bouchard's government then balanced the provincial budget – a feat achieved in Canada only by the federal government and a few of the ten Canadian provinces at that point – by reducing government spending, including social programs. The PQ was re-elected in the 1998 election, despite receiving fewer votes than the Quebec Liberal Party led by former federal deputy prime minister Jean Charest. Bouchard resigned in 2001, and was succeeded as PQ leader and Quebec Premier by Bernard Landry, a former PQ Finance minister. Under Landry's leadership, the party lost the 2003 election to Jean Charest's Liberals.

=== Return to opposition ===
Mid-late 2004 was difficult for Landry's leadership, which was being contested. A vote was held during the party's June 2005 convention to determine whether Landry continued to have the confidence of the party membership. Landry said he wanted at least 80% of approval. After gaining 76.2% approval on the confidence vote from party membership on 4 June 2005, Landry announced his intention to resign.

Louise Harel had been chosen to replace him until a new leader, André Boisclair, was elected on 15 November 2005, through the party's 2005 leadership election. At the time of Boisclair's election, the PQ was as much as 20% ahead of the Liberals in opinion polls, suggesting that Boisclair would lead them to a landslide majority government in the next election.

Progressives on the left wing of the PQ perceived a rightward move by the party towards neoliberalism under Bouchard, Landry and Boisclair. In 2006, a new left-wing party, Québec solidaire, was formed which included many activists who likely would formerly have been members or supporters of the PQ. Over subsequent elections, the QS attracted increasing support from left-wing sovereigntists disillusioned with the PQ. At the same time on the right, the ADQ and later the Coalition Avenir Québec attracted the votes of right-wing and soft sovereigntists who eventually become Quebec autonomists and Canadian federalists while retaining their Quebec nationalist identities. These political developments resulted in the PQ being squeezed from both sides.

The PQ was unable to maintain the momentum it briefly had under Boisclair, and in the 2007 provincial election, the party fell to 36 seats and behind the conservative Action démocratique du Québec (ADQ) in number of seats and the popular vote: this was the first time since 1973 that the party did not form the government or the Official Opposition. Boisclair said that the voters clearly did not support a strategy of a rapid referendum in the first mandate of a PQ government. Instead of a policy convention following the election, the party held a presidents' council. The party caucus in the provincial legislative assembly was said to have supported Boisclair continuing as leader.

On 8 May 2007, Boisclair announced his resignation as leader of the PQ. This was effective immediately, although Boisclair confirmed he would remain within the PQ caucus for the time being. He was replaced by veteran MNA François Gendron, pending a leadership race and convention.

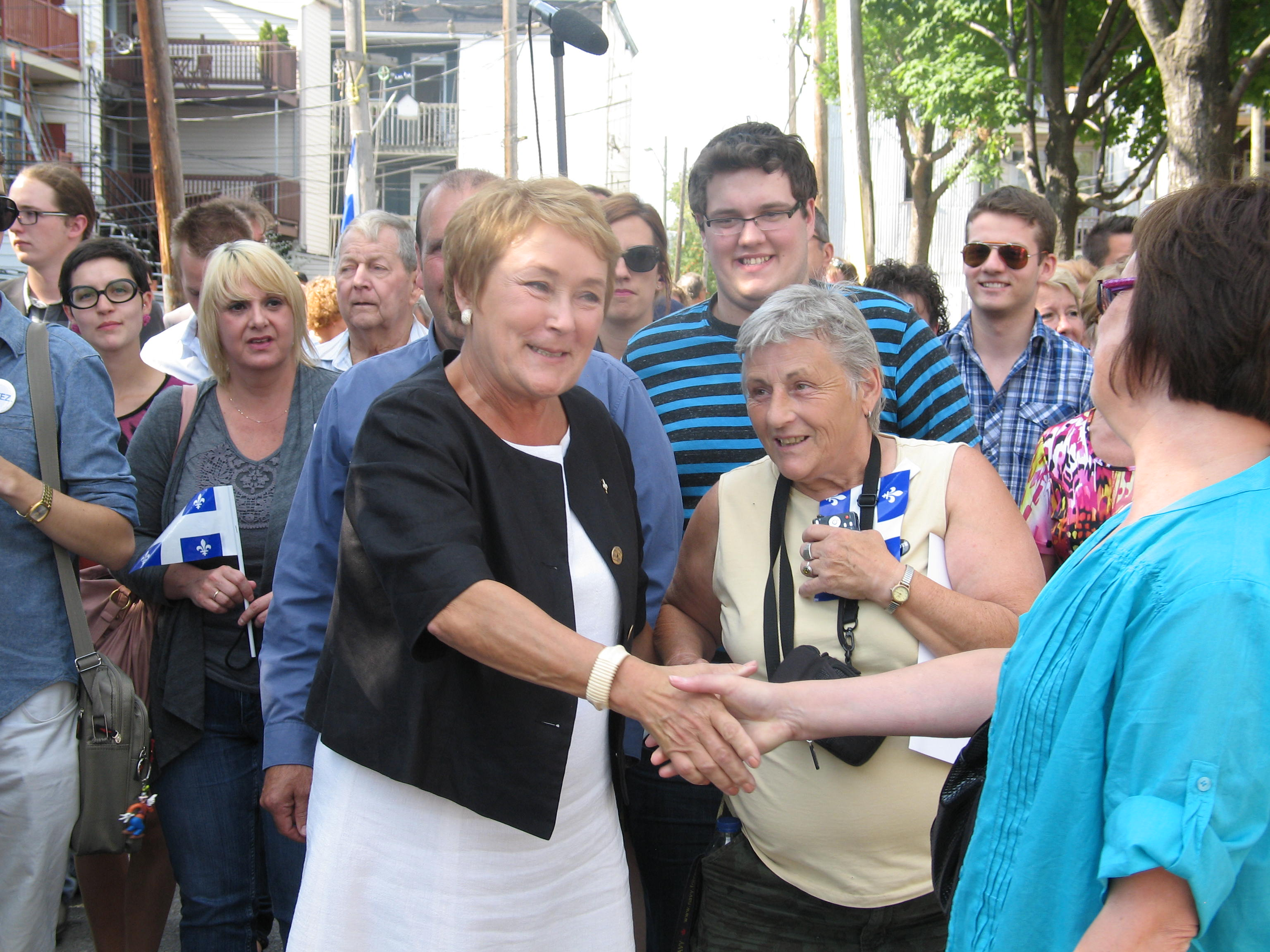
Premier Marois greets voters in Quebec City on the eve of the 2012 general election.

Former Bloc Québécois leader Gilles Duceppe was the first to announce his intention to run for party leadership, on 11 May 2007. He was followed the same day by Pauline Marois. In a surprise move, Duceppe withdrew on the 12th – leaving Marois the only declared candidate. No other candidates came forward, and on 26 June 2007, Marois won the leadership by acclamation.

In June 2011, the party was shaken when four of its most prominent MNAs — popular actor Pierre Curzi, former cabinet minister Louise Beaudoin, and Lisette Lapointe, the wife of former premier Jacques Parizeau, and Jean-Martin Aussant — quit the party to sit as independents. They disagreed with Marois's support for a bill changing the law to permit an agreement between the City of Québec and Quebecor Inc. concerning the management of the new sports and entertainment complex in Quebec City. Unrest continued later in the month when a fifth MNA, Benoit Charette, also quit, citing his dissatisfaction with the party's sole focus being sovereignty. Beaudoin rejoined the PQ caucus in 2012.

=== Marois and minority government ===
The party won a minority government under Marois in the 2012 provincial election with 54 of 125 seats in the National Assembly. It embarked on a program of "sovereigntist governance" in relations with the rest of Canada, to return Quebec to balanced budgets through higher taxes and debt reduction, to increase the use of French in public services, and to address resource development in Northern Quebec. However the PQ's 'new Bill 101' did not pass. The centrepiece of the government's program was a Quebec Charter of Values which would have curtailed minority religious identity by banning the wearing of religious symbols by those in the employ of the government, particularly Sikh turbans, Muslim veils and Jewish kippahs.

Based on the charter's growing popularity among francophones, Marois called an early election for 7 April 2014 in an attempt to win a majority government. Despite leading in the polls when the writ was dropped, the campaign went badly due to several mishaps. The recruitment of star candidate Pierre Karl Péladeau, whose comments made sovereignty and the prospect of another referendum a focus of the campaign, as well as feminist Janette Bertrand suggesting that wealthy Muslim men were taking over swimming pools, among other incidents badly hurt the PQ. Marois' government was defeated by the Liberals, led by Philippe Couillard, in the 2014 provincial election which resulted in a Liberal majority government. The PQ won 25% of the vote and 30 seats, its worst result in terms of popular vote since 1970. Marois lost her own seat, and announced her intention to resign as PQ leader that night.

Stéphane Bédard was chosen interim parliamentary leader by the PQ caucus on 10 April 2014.

In 20 October 2014 Lévis by-election, PQ candidate Alexandre Bégin came in third place, with 8.28% of the popular vote, only narrowly beating Québec Solidaire.

=== Collapse and brief loss of official party status ===
On 27 November 2014, Pierre Karl Péladeau announced his intentions to run for PQ's leadership, joining Bernard Drainville, Martine Ouellet, Jean-François Lisée, Alexandre Cloutier, and Pierre Céré.

Despite a fiercely contested race, Péladeau was the frontrunner for much of the campaign, causing Jean-François Lisée to drop out in January 2015, Bernard Drainville to drop out on 22 April 2015, and Pierre Céré to follow Drainville only five days before the leadership election.

On 15 May 2015, Pierre Karl Péladeau was elected permanent leader.

On 2 May 2016, Péladeau announced that he was retiring from politics to dedicate more time to his family.

Jean-François Lisée was elected leader of Parti Québécois on 7 October 2016.

Lisée charged Manon Massé with reneging in unsuccessful deliberations for a putative electoral alliance between the Parti Québécois and Québec Solidaire in 2017.

For the 2018 provincial election, the PQ ruled out holding a referendum on sovereignty until 2022 at the earliest. With the sovereignty issue taken off the table for the first time in almost half a century, the 2018 election unfolded in a historic way, being the first time in a half century a party other than the Parti Québécois or Liberals were elected to power, with a Coalition Avenir Québec majority win. It also marked the first time in 42 years that the Parti Québécois did not win enough seats to maintain official status in the legislature. With only 10 seats won, not only did it lose official status, but was relegated to third place (tied with Québec solidaire). The PQ was reduced to its smallest presence in the National Assembly since its first election in 1970. In this election the Parti Québécois only garnered 17% of the popular vote, the lowest score in party's history at the time.

With few exceptions, its support bled to the CAQ, which took several ridings that had been in PQ hands for 40 years or more, by large margins in many cases. A number of longtime PQ supporters defected to the CAQ because they no longer believed sovereignty was a realistic goal. Notably, the party was completely shut out of Montreal for the first time in memory, including its traditional stronghold in the heavily francophone eastern portion. Historically, when the PQ won government, the eastern half of the Island of Montreal was coated light blue. Many younger sovereigntists defected to Québec Solidaire.

Leader Jean-François Lisée was defeated in his own riding and resigned thereafter, accepting the blame for his party's failure and collapse. After 50 years in the forefront of Quebec politics, the Parti Québécois had been pushed into marginal status. According to The Globe and Mail, within hours of the results being known, there was speculation that the party's very survival was in doubt; there were concerns that it was no longer capable of attracting enough support "to justify its political usefulness". Christian Bourque of Montreal-based pollster Léger Marketing suggested that the PQ was likely finished in its present form, and would have to merge with another sovereigntist party to avoid fading into irrelevance. On 27 November 2018, the CAQ granted both the PQ and Québec Solidaire official status in the legislature, despite the parties being short on seats and percentage of the popular vote in order to qualify.

However, on 11 March 2019, Catherine Fournier, the youngest MNA in the party and the province and the only PQ MNA from Greater Montreal, resigned from the Parti Québécois to sit as an independent, claiming the party had lost its way. At the same time, several members of the PQ's youth wing expressed concern that the party might not have a future. Fournier's defection dropped the party into fourth place, losing its standing as second opposition and potentially losing their official party status once again.

The next leadership election occurred on 9 October 2020, with lawyer Paul St-Pierre Plamondon being elected as the tenth Parti Québécois leader.

=== St-Pierre Plamondon leadership and return to government ===
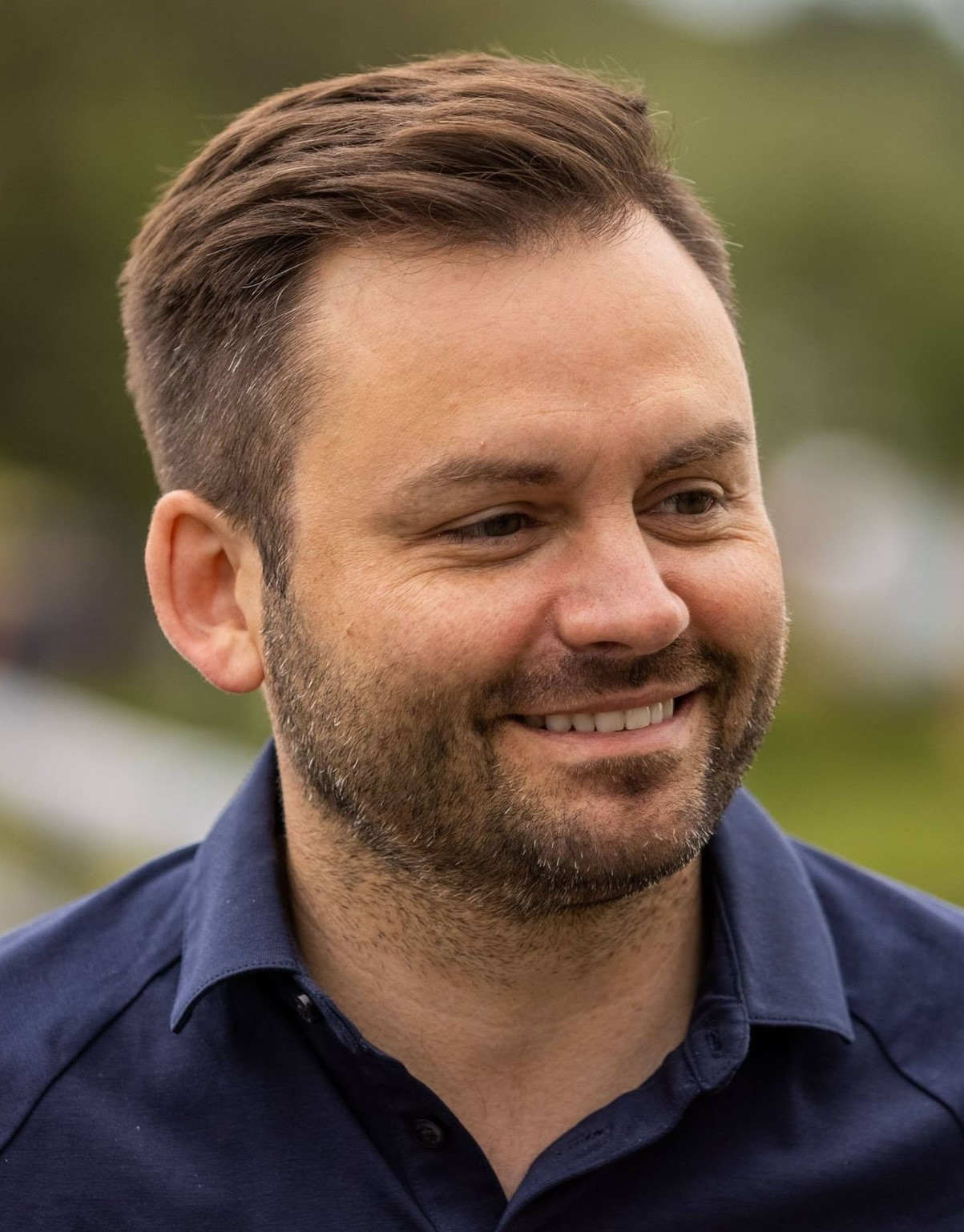
Premier St-Pierre Plamondon.

The 2022 provincial election saw even further erosion and an unprecedented loss of support for the Parti Québécois. Not only did the party once again not form government or the official opposition, but it was reduced to its smallest-ever presence in the legislature, with only three seats won. The previous low was its second election, in 1973, where the party won six seats. Although new party leader Paul St-Pierre Plamondon managed to win his seat, the PQ lost its official party status and came in a distant fourth place. It won only 14 percent of the vote, its lowest ever. The movement of most voter support over to the CAQ and other nationalist parties put into question the party's relevance and its ability to survive in future. Despite this, the party did outperform polling expectations that previously showed the party receiving under 10 percent of the vote and being almost completely shut out of the Assembly.

On 1 December 2022, the PQ's three newly elected members were barred from the Quebec legislature following their refusal to swear an oath to the King, as required by the Constitution Act, 1867. In response, on 9 December 2022, the CAQ passed a bill abolishing the requirement, allowing the PQ into the legislature by early 2023, however its legality is being questioned.

After the 2022 provincial election, the PQ held a leadership confidence vote in March 2023. St-Pierre Plamondon broke a record for the PQ votes of confidence, with 98.51% support.

Since the 2022 election, the PQ saw an increase in its support in polls with them polling as the second largest party but still behind the CAQ. On 2 October 2023, the PQ won its fourth seat with its win in the 2023 Jean-Talon provincial by-election, with Pascal Paradis being elected MNA. Since November 2023, the PQ has been polling as the largest party with support over 30%. Their polling has reportedly been affected by the 2025 United States trade war with Canada and Mexico. On 17 March 2025, the PQ won its fifth seat with its win in the 2025 Terrebonne provincial by-election, with Catherine Gentilcore being elected MNA. On 11 August 2025, the PQ won its sixth seat with its win in the 2025 Arthabaska provincial by-election, with Alex Boissonneault being elected MNA; the party would also win the 2026 Chicoutimi provincial by-election, with Marie-Karlynn Laflamme elected MNA.

Paul St-Pierre Plamondon led the PQ to a significant rebound in popularity in the 2026 Quebec general election, winning 28% of the popular vote and jumping from 7 seats to 60, after having won just 3 in 2022, and forming government for the first time since 2012. Despite falling short of a majority government, St-Pierre Plamondon became premier of Quebec.

== Relationship with the Bloc Québécois ==
The Bloc Québécois (BQ) is a federal political party founded in 1990 by former Progressive Conservative MP Lucien Bouchard. It has traditionally had close ties to the Parti Québécois and shares its principal objective of sovereignty. The two parties have frequently shared political candidates, and have supported each other during election campaigns. The two parties have a similar membership and voter base. Prominent members of either party often attend and speak at both organizations' public events. Gilles Duceppe, the former Bloc leader, is also the son of Jean Duceppe, a Quebec actor who helped found the PQ after having been a founding member of the New Democratic Party.

In June 2014, Mario Beaulieu, a former PQ riding president and Bloc candidate, was elected leader of the Bloc Québécois. Notwithstanding his previous ties to both parties, Beaulieu has been critical of what he sees as a too timid approach to sovereignty by both the Bloc and PQ. Beaulieu's election as Bloc leader was more warmly received by the PQ's rival party, Option nationale, than by the PQ.

== Policies and stances ==
The Parti Québécois centres on the protection of the Franco-Québécois identity, up to or including the ultimate result of sovereignty-association. Sovereigntism, however, is 'Article 1' in its party program.

After then-French President Nicolas Sarkozy rejected the long-standing "non-interference, non-indifference" stance towards Quebec should it seek sovereignty in 2009, PQ leader and Premier Pauline Marois' visit to France in October 2012 saw her reinstate it with French President François Hollande. Also during her visit, Marois commented that "Canada's current foreign policy corresponds to neither our values nor our interests".

The PQ delivered a brief to the reasonable accommodation commission on minorities, which conducted hearings across the province. The commission briefing looked to reformulate the relations between Quebec's francophone and minority populations. Its task was to be a platform for the PQ's protectionism of French.

Marois stated there is nothing dogmatic in Francophones wishing to declare their existence even if it includes developing legislation requiring newcomers to have a basic understanding of French before becoming citizens of Quebec.

Further to her desire to protect French in Quebec, during Marois' visit to France in October 2012, she recommended that the "French elite" conduct themselves only in French on the international scene. However, some of Marois' international critics scoffed at her pretension that the "French elite" were Québécois.

Marois stated the PQ understands the arrival of newcomers is attractive and they "contribute greatly" to Quebec's growth. However, she stated that she does not imply that to better assimilate them that "we must erase our own history."

As of 2014, the PQ electoral program describes the party's main commitment: "Aspiring to political liberty, the Parti Québécois has as its first objective to achieve the sovereignty of Quebec after consulting the population by a referendum to be held at the moment that the government judges appropriate."

Other electoral issues were the Quebec Charter of Values, and language.

Like the Coalition Avenir Québec (CAQ), the PQ supported the Quebec ban on face covering but also argued the ban is not extensive enough.

In 2025, Paul St-Pierre Plamondon stated that if a sovereignty referendum were successful, Quebec would establish its own currency up to a decade after the vote. The PQ would also consider establishing an independent commission to evaluate creating its own currency, keeping the Canadian dollar, or adopting the American dollar. St-Pierre Plamondon has also promised to abolish the monarchy in Quebec and requested that the Lieutenant Governor of Quebec be absent during St-Pierre Plamondon's swearing in as Premier of Quebec in October 2026.

After winning the 2026 provincial election, the Parti Québécois proposed stricter language requirements and substantial cuts to immigration. Their proposals include cutting the current 500,000 temporary foreign residents by 40%-50% over the course of their four-year mandate. They also proposed a cut on permanent residents, from 45,000 people per year to 35,000, with priority given to intermediate and advanced French speakers, as well as people already living in Quebec (as opposed to the rest of the country).

Economically, Paul St-Pierre Plamondon's PQ has called for more fiscal responsibility, claiming that the previous CAQ government "left the house in disarray," leaving the incoming PQ government with a deficit of $8.6 billion dollars. As such, the party plans to cut $6.6-billion in government spending over five years, while also eliminating the sales tax on second-hand goods, cutting the gas tax in half, and cutting taxes for small and medium-sized businesses. Upon election, the party also immediately promised to unlock an emergency fund of $28 million to help cities fight homelessness.

== Branding ==
Logo of the party from 1985 to 2007

Logo of the party from 2007 to 2021

=== Logo ===
The party's distinctive logo was designed in 1968 by painter and poet Roland Giguère. It consists of a stylised letter Q, represented by a blue circle broken by a red arrow. The creator meant it as an allegory of the Parti Québécois breaking the circle of colonialism which he claimed Canada was imposing on Quebec and opening Quebec upon the world and the future. The PQ has made very few significant modifications to its logo during its history. In 1985 it made the circle and arrow slightly thicker, and placed the tip of the latter at the centre of the circle. The original saw it span the whole diameter. When placed upon a blue background instead of a white one, the circle was commonly turned to white, the single main design variation currently observed.

The party revealed a new logo on 21 February 2007, at the beginning of the 2007 provincial election campaign. While maintaining the basic style of past logos, the Q was redesigned and modernized. In addition, the tail of the Q was recoloured green. This logo was replaced in 2021 with a new logo that incorporated the fleur-de-lis into the letter "Q".

=== Slogans ===
These are the slogans used by the Parti Québécois in general election campaigns throughout its history. They are displayed with an unofficial translation. The elections in which the PQ won or remained in power are in bold.

- 1970: OUI – Yes
- 1973: J'ai le goût du Québec – I have a taste for Quebec
- **1976: On a besoin d'un vrai gouvernement – We need a real government**
- **1981: Faut rester forts au Québec – We must remain strong in Quebec**
- 1985: Le Québec avec Johnson – Québec with Johnson
- 1989: Je prends le parti du Québec – I am choosing Quebec's party / I am taking Quebec's side (double meaning)
- **1994: L'autre façon de gouverner – The other way of governing**
- **1998: J'ai confiance – I am confident / I trust**
- 2003: Restons forts – Let us stay strong
- 2007: Reconstruisons notre Québec – Let us rebuild our Quebec
- 2008: Québec gagnant avec Pauline – Quebec winning with Pauline
- **2012: À nous de choisir – The choice is ours**
- 2014: Plus prospère, plus fort, plus indépendant, plus accueillant – More prosperous, stronger, more independent, more welcoming
- 2018: Sérieusement – Seriously
- 2022: Le Québec qui s'assume. Pour vrai. – A Quebec that accepts itself. For real
- **2026: Le choix de la confiance – The choice of trust**

== Election results ==
=== National Assembly ===
Election	Leader	Votes	%	Seats	+/–	Position	Status
1970	René Lévesque	662,404	23.06	7 / 108	▲7	▲4th	No status
1973	René Lévesque	897,809	30.22	6 / 110	▼1	▲2nd	Opposition
1976	René Lévesque	1,390,351	41.37	71 / 110	▲65	▲1st	Majority
1981	René Lévesque	1,773,237	49.26	80 / 122	▲9	1st	Majority
1985	Pierre-Marc Johnson	1,320,008	38.69	23 / 122	▼57	▼2nd	Opposition
1989	Jacques Parizeau	1,369,067	40.16	29 / 125	▲6	2nd	Opposition
1994	Jacques Parizeau	1,751,442	44.75	77 / 125	▲48	▲1st	Majority
1998	Lucien Bouchard	1,744,240	42.87	76 / 125	▼1	1st	Majority
2003	Bernard Landry	1,269,183	33.24	45 / 125	▼31	▼2nd	Opposition
2007	André Boisclair	1,125,546	28.35	36 / 125	▼9	▼3rd	Third party
2008	Pauline Marois	1,139,185	35.17	51 / 125	▲15	▲2nd	Opposition
2012	Pauline Marois	1,393,703	31.95	54 / 125	▲3	▲1st	Minority
2014	Pauline Marois	1,074,120	25.38	30 / 125	▼24	▼2nd	Opposition
2018	Jean-François Lisée	687,995	17.06	10 / 125	▼20	▼3rd	No status
2022	Paul St-Pierre Plamondon	600,708	14.61	3 / 125	▼7	▼4th	No status
2026	Paul St-Pierre Plamondon	1,199,925	28.02	60 / 127	▲57	▲1st	Minority

== Party leaders ==
Party leader	Years as party leader	Years as Premier
René Lévesque	1968–85	1976–85
Pierre-Marc Johnson	1985–87	1985
Guy Chevrette	1987–88 (interim)	None
Jacques Parizeau	1988–96	1994–96
Lucien Bouchard	1996–2001	1996–2001
Bernard Landry	2001–05	2001–03
Louise Harel	2005 (interim)	None
André Boisclair	2005–07	None
François Gendron	2007 (interim)	None
Pauline Marois	2007–14	2012–14
Stéphane Bédard	2014–15 (interim)	None
Pierre Karl Péladeau	2015–16	None
Sylvain Gaudreault	2016 (interim)	None
Jean-François Lisée	2016–18	None
Pascal Bérubé	2018–20 (interim)	None
Paul St-Pierre Plamondon	2020–present	2026–present

== Leaders in the legislature ==
When a Parti Québécois leader does not have a seat in the National Assembly, another member leads the party in the legislature.

Parliamentary leader	Years as parliamentary leader	Comments
René Lévesque	1968–70	René Lévesque sat as an independent member until 29 April 1970 election.
Camille Laurin	1970–73	René Lévesque did not have a seat from 29 April 1970 to 29 October 1973.
Jacques-Yvan Morin	1973–76	René Lévesque did not have a seat from 29 October 1973 to 15 November 1976.
René Lévesque	1976–85	Regain a seat in the general election
Pierre-Marc Johnson	1985–87	
Guy Chevrette	1987–89	Became Leader of the Opposition when Johnson resigned on 10 November 1987. Remained parliamentary leader after Jacques Parizeau became party leader from 19 March 1988 until Parizeau won a seat on 25 September 1989.
Jacques Parizeau	1989–96	
Lucien Bouchard	1996–2001	Lucien Bouchard did not have a seat from 27 January 1996 to 19 February 1996.
Bernard Landry	2001–05	
Louise Harel	2005–06	André Boisclair did not have a seat from 15 November 2005 to 14 August 2006.
André Boisclair	2006–07	
François Gendron	2007	
Pauline Marois	2007–14	As incumbent Premier Marois lost her seat in the general election on 7 April 2014 and announced her resignation as leader.
Stéphane Bédard	2014–15	Interim leader between Marois' defeat and Péladeau's election
Pierre Karl Péladeau	2015–16	
Sylvain Gaudreault	2016	Interim leader following Péladeau's resignation
Jean-François Lisée	2016–18	Lost his seat in the general election
Pascal Bérubé	2018–21	Interim leader following Lisée's resignation; remained legislative leader until 2022, as leader Paul St-Pierre Plamondon did not have a seat in the National Assembly
Joël Arseneau	2021–22	
Paul St-Pierre Plamondon	2022–present	Won seat at the 2022 Quebec general election

== Party presidents ==
Until 5 June 2005, the office of President of the Parti Québécois was known as First Vice-president of the Parti Québécois.

Party president	Years as party president	Comments
Gilles Grégoire	1968–71	
Camille Laurin	1971–79	
Louise Harel	1979–81	
Sylvain Simard	1981–84	
Nadia Assimopoulos	1984–88	
Pauline Marois	1988–89	
Bernard Landry	1989–94	
Monique Simard	1994–96	
Fabien Béchard	1996–2000	
Marie Malavoy	2000–05	
Monique Richard	2005–09	
Jonathan Valois	2009–11	
Raymond Archambault	2011–17	
Gabrielle Lemieux	2017–19	
Dieudonné Ella Oyono	2019–21	
Jocelyn Caron	2021–23	
Catherine Gentilcore	2023–25	Catherine Gentilcore has served as the MNA for Terrebonne since 17 March 2025.
Jerry Beaudoin	2025–present	

== Leadership elections ==
- Parti Québécois leadership elections
- 1985 Parti Québécois leadership election
- 2005 Parti Québécois leadership election
- 2007 Parti Québécois leadership election
- 2015 Parti Québécois leadership election
- 2016 Parti Québécois leadership election
- 2020 Parti Québécois leadership election

== See also ==
- Politics of Quebec
- History of Quebec
- List of political parties in Quebec
- Sovereigntist events and strategies
- Secessionist movements of Canada
