= Repentigny (provincial electoral district) =

Provincial electoral district in Quebec, Canada

Coordinates: 45.770°N 73.426°W

Quebec electoral district
- Location in L'Assomption

Provincial electoral district
- Legislature: National Assembly of Quebec
MNA
Nicolas Girard
Parti Québécois
- District created: 2011
- First contested: 2012
- Last contested: 2026

Demographics
- Population (2011): 63,340
- Electors (2012): 50,426
- Area (km²): 87.3
- Pop. density (per km²): 725.5
- Census division: L'Assomption (part)
- Census subdivision(s): Charlemagne, Repentigny

Repentigny (French pronunciation: [ʁəpɑ̃tiɲi]) is a provincial electoral district in the Lanaudière region of Quebec, Canada, that elects members to the National Assembly of Quebec. It consists of the city of Charlemagne and part of the city of Repentigny.

It was created for the 2012 election from part of the L'Assomption electoral district.

== Members of the National Assembly ==
Legislature	Years	Member	Party
Riding created from L'Assomption
40th	2012–2014	Scott McKay	Parti Québécois
41st	2014–2018	Lise Lavallée	Coalition Avenir Québec
42nd	2018–2022	Lise Lavallée	Coalition Avenir Québec
43rd	2022–2026	Pascale Déry	Coalition Avenir Québec
44th	2026–Present	Nicolas Girard	Parti Québécois

== Election results ==
2026 Quebec general election
** Preliminary results — Not yet official **
Party	Candidate	Votes	%	±%
Parti Québécois	Nicolas Girard	14,604	36.21	
Coalition Avenir Québec	Pascale Déry	8,754	21.70	
Liberal	Yvena Luc	7,554	18.73	
Conservative	Vincent Côté	5,158	12.79	
Québec solidaire	Martin Lefebvre	3,931	9.75	
Green	Shawn-Brandon Rimpel	332	0.82	
Total valid votes				
Total rejected ballots				
Turnout			72.11	
Electors on the lists			–	–
Parti Québécois gain from Coalition Avenir Québec		Swing		+
Source: Élections Québec

2022 Quebec general election
Party	Candidate	Votes	%	±%
Coalition Avenir Québec	Pascale Déry	19,747	52.36	+2.62
Parti Québécois	Aïcha Van Dun	6,686	17.73	-1.06
Québec solidaire	Ednal Marc	4,783	12.68	-2.19
Liberal	Virginie Bouchard	3,758	9.96	-3.70
Conservative	Serge Cloutier	2,419	6.41	+5.60
Climat Québec	David Brisebois	321	0.85	–
Total valid votes		37,714	98.71	–
Total rejected ballots		492	1.29	-0.26
Turnout		37,714	73.24	-0.97
Electors on the lists		52,169	–	–
Coalition Avenir Québec hold		Swing		+1.84

2018 Quebec general election
Party	Candidate	Votes	%	±%
Coalition Avenir Québec	Lise Lavallée	18,799	49.74	+13.67
Parti Québécois	Eric Tremblay	7,101	18.79	-14.82
Québec solidaire	Olivier Huard	5,622	14.87	+8.4
Liberal	Emilie Therrien	5,166	13.67	-8.98
Green	Chafika Hebib	441	1.17	
Citoyens au pouvoir	Julie Girard	357	0.94	
Conservative	Pierre Lacombe	309	0.82	+0.29
Total valid votes		37,795	98.46	
Total rejected ballots		593	1.54	
Turnout		38,388	74.21	
Eligible voters		51,729		
Coalition Avenir Québec hold		Swing		+14.245
Source(s) "Rapport des résultats officiels du scrutin". Élections Québec.

2014 Quebec general election
Party	Candidate	Votes	%	±%
Coalition Avenir Québec	Lise Lavallée	13,889	36.07	-1.63
Parti Québécois	Scott McKay	12,941	33.61	-7.09
Liberal	Robert Nantel	8,721	22.65	+7.55
Québec solidaire	Olivier Huard	2,490	6.47	+2.27
Option nationale	Christian Strasbourg	260	0.68	-1.62
Conservative	Pierre Lacombe	204	0.53	–
Total valid votes		38,505	98.39	–
Total rejected ballots		631	1.61	–
Turnout		39,136	76.02	-6.44
Electors on the lists		51,484	–	–
Coalition Avenir Québec gain from Parti Québécois		Swing		+2.73

2012 Quebec general election
Party	Candidate	Votes	%	±%
Parti Québécois	Scott McKay	16,762	40.70	-2.03
Coalition Avenir Québec	Chantal Longpré	15,525	37.70	+18.93
Liberal	Marc Thompson	6,217	15.10	-16.98
Québec solidaire	Olivier Huard	1,730	4.20	+1.27
Option nationale	Anne-Marie Labrosse	948	2.30	–
Total valid votes		41,182	98.80	–
Total rejected ballots		500	1.20	–
Turnout		41,682	82.46	
Electors on the lists		50,547	–	–
Parti Québécois hold		Swing		-10.48

^ Change is from redistributed results. CAQ change is from ADQ.

== See also ==
- List of Quebec provincial electoral districts
- Canadian provincial electoral districts
