= South Shore Furniture =

Canadian furniture company

- Native name: Meubles South Shore
- Industry: Manufacturer
- Founded: 1940; 86 years ago
- Founder: Eugène Laflamme
- Headquarters: Sainte-Croix-De-Lotbinière, Quebec, Canada
- Key people: Eugène Laflamme, Guy Laflamme
- Products: Furniture
- Owner: Jean Laflamme
- Number of employees: 700
- Website: www.southshorefurniture.com

South Shore Furniture (incorporated as Les Industries de la Rive Sud Ltée and also known as Meubles Rive Sud) is a Canadian furniture manufacturer. It sells ready-to-assemble furniture and fully assembled furniture in Canada, Mexico, and the United States.

== History ==
South Shore Furniture was founded by Eugène Laflamme in 1940. The company was incorporated in Quebec under the name Les Industries de la Rive Sud Ltée. During the 1960s and 1970s, it grew larger through furniture company purchases. South Shore purchased two Quebec companies: Laurierville-based Morrissette & frères and in 1978 Coaticook-based J.W. Kilgour Ltd. David W. Conklin's 1994 case study noted that South Shore was able to purchase better equipment and enlarge its factories by relying on only its profits instead of outside investment, so it was not affected by monetary difficulties arising from the stock market's drop or the Quebec Stock Savings Plan. In 1970, Eugène Laflamme's son, Guy Laflamme, became managing director.

By the 1990s, South Shore faced "Buy American" feelings from consumers, lessening the number of exports it could make to the United States. By the late 2000s, South Shore stopped selling its products to American stores and instead starting selling products to Americans online. The reasons were threefold: expensive transportation expenses, the Canadian dollar reaching equal value with the American dollar, and Chinese businesses that made South Shore's products less competitive. In 2008, South Shore began selling products on the Internet through websites of companies including Amazon, Walmart, and Target. In 2012, 70% of the company goods were sold in the United States. South Shore sells its furniture in Canada both online and through retailers such as Tanguay and Brault & Martineau.

In 1999, Jean Laflamme, the grandson of the founder Eugène Laflamme and son of the previous owner Guy Laflamme, took over the company. During the 2008 financial crisis, CEO Jean Laflamme in 2007 closed South Shore's Laurierville factory whose 120 workers were laid off. The company's workforce dropped to 650 during the worst of the crisis. The company announced a rebranding during its 70th anniversary year in 2010. It decided to start going by only its English name, South Shore Furniture. In the past, it had gone by names in two other languages: Les Industries de la Rive Sud (French) and Meubles Rive Sud (Spanish).

The company makes 850 kinds of products. In 2016, South Shore has 850 employees working in two Quebec factories, a Juárez, Mexico factory, and an El Paso, Texas distribution center. The company ships roughly 4,000 furniture pieces every day and during peak times ships 10,000. A 2016 article in La Presse noted that the company's weaknesses included costly investments and a hard time recruiting employees, particularly those in the computer science and new media fields.
