= Lise Lavallée =

Canadian politician

Member of the National Assembly of Quebec for Repentigny
- In office April 7, 2014 – August 28, 2022
- Preceded by: Scott McKay
- Succeeded by: Pascale Déry

Personal details
- Born: March 4, 1957 (age 69)
- Party: Coalition Avenir Québec

Lise Lavallée (born March 4, 1957) is a Canadian politician. She was the member of the Quebec National Assembly for the Coalition Avenir Québec in the riding of Repentigny, having been elected in the 2014 and 2018 Quebec elections, not re-offering in 2022.

== Political career ==
Lavallée joined the Coalition Avenir Québec (CAQ) at the time of its founding in 2011. She was elected as a member of the National Assembly in 2014 for the CAQ when she defeated the incumbent in Repentigny, Scott McKay of the Parti Québécois.

== Personal life ==
Lavallée has lived in the city of Repentigny since 1970. Prior to her election to the provincial legislature in 2014, she was a civil law notary and legal advisor in private practice. She is a member of the chamber of commerce for L'Assomption Regional County Municipality, where from 2011 to 2013 she served on the chamber's committee for women in business, and later on the committee for business development and local purchasing.

== Electoral record ==
2014 Quebec general election
Party	Candidate	Votes	%	±%
Coalition Avenir Québec	Lise Lavallée	13,889	36.07	-1.63
Parti Québécois	Scott McKay	12,941	33.61	-7.09
Liberal	Robert Nantel	8,721	22.65	+7.55
Québec solidaire	Olivier Huard	2,490	6.47	+2.27
Option nationale	Christian Strasbourg	260	0.68	-1.62
Conservative	Pierre Lacombe	204	0.53	–
Total valid votes		38,505	98.39	–
Total rejected ballots		631	1.61	–
Turnout		39,136	76.02	-6.44
Electors on the lists		51,484	–	–
Coalition Avenir Québec gain from Parti Québécois		Swing		+2.73
