= L'Assomption (provincial electoral district) =

Provincial electoral district in Quebec, Canada

Coordinates: 45.819°N 73.497°W

Quebec electoral district
- Location in L'Assomption

Provincial electoral district
- Legislature: National Assembly of Quebec
MNA
Maxime Laporte
Parti Québécois
- District created: 1829
- Last contested: 2026

Demographics
- Population (2011): 67,320
- Electors (2012): 51,041
- Area (km²): 226.9
- Pop. density (per km²): 296.7
- Census division(s): L'Assomption (part), Les Moulins (part)
- Census subdivision(s): L'Assomption, L'Épiphanie, Lavaltrie, Repentigny, Saint-Sulpîce

L'Assomption (French pronunciation: [lasɔ̃psjɔ̃]) is a provincial electoral district in the Lanaudière region of Quebec, Canada, which elects one member to the National Assembly of Quebec. It includes the city of L'Assomption and part of the city of Repentigny, as well as a few other municipalities. It has existed continuously since the 1st Quebec Legislature. Since 2012 its member of the National Assembly (MNA) has been François Legault of the Coalition Avenir Québec (CAQ), who served as Premier of Quebec from 2018 to 2026.

== History ==
It was created for the 1867 election; an electoral district of that name existed earlier in the Legislative Assembly of the Province of Canada and the Legislative Assembly of Lower Canada.

== Geography ==
In the change from the 2001 to the 2011 electoral map, it lost Saint-Sulpice and part of the city of Repentigny to the newly created Repentigny electoral district, but it gained Charlemagne and a different part of the city of Repentigny from Masson; it also gained the town of L'Épiphanie and the parish of L'Épiphanie as well as the part of the city of L'Assomption that it did not already have from Rousseau; it also gained part of the city of Terrebonne from the Terrebonne electoral district.

In the change from the 2011 to 2017 electoral map, it lost all of its territory in Terrebonne to the riding of Masson.

== Members of the Legislative Assembly / National Assembly ==
Legislature	Years	Member	Party
1st	1867–1871	Étienne Mathieu	Conservative
2nd	1871–1875	Onuphe Peltier	Conservative
3rd	1875–1878	Onuphe Peltier	Conservative
4th	1878–1880†	Onuphe Peltier	Conservative
4th	1880–1881	Joseph Marion	Conservative
5th	1881–1886	Joseph Marion	Conservative
6th	1886–1890	Ludger Forest	Liberal
7th	1890–1892	Joseph Marion	Conservative
8th	1892–1897	Joseph Marion	Conservative
9th	1897–1900	Joseph Marion	Conservative
10th	1900–1904	Joseph-Édouard Duhamel	Liberal
11th	1904–1906	Joseph-Édouard Duhamel	Liberal
11th	1906–1908	Louis-Joseph Gauthier	Liberal
12th	1908–1912	Walter Reed	Liberal
13th	1912–1916	Walter Reed	Liberal
14th	1916–1919	Walter Reed	Liberal
15th	1919–1923	Walter Reed	Liberal
16th	1923–1927	Walter Reed	Liberal
17th	1927–1931	Walter Reed	Liberal
18th	1931–1935	Walter Reed	Liberal
19th	1935–1936	Paul Gouin	Action liberale nationale
20th	1936–1939	Adhémar Raynault	Union Nationale
21st	1939–1944	Bernard Bissonnette	Liberal
22nd	1944–1948	Victor-Stanislas Chartrand	Union Nationale
23rd	1948–1952	Victor-Stanislas Chartrand	Union Nationale
24th	1952–1956	Victor-Stanislas Chartrand	Union Nationale
25th	1956–1960	Victor-Stanislas Chartrand	Union Nationale
26th	1960–1961	Victor-Stanislas Chartrand	Union Nationale
26th	1961–1962	Frédéric Coiteux	Liberal
27th	1962–1966	Frédéric Coiteux	Liberal
28th	1966–1970	Robert Lussier	Union Nationale
29th	1970–1973	Jean Perreault	Liberal
30th	1973–1976	Jean Perreault	Liberal
31st	1976–1981	Jacques Parizeau	Parti Québécois
32nd	1981–1984	Jacques Parizeau	Parti Québécois
32nd	1985–1985	Jean-Guy Gervais	Liberal
33rd	1985–1989	Jean-Guy Gervais	Liberal
34th	1989–1994	Jacques Parizeau	Parti Québécois
35th	1994–1996	Jacques Parizeau	Parti Québécois
35th	1996–1998	Jean-Claude St-André	Parti Québécois
36th	1998–2003	Jean-Claude St-André	Parti Québécois
37th	2003–2007	Jean-Claude St-André	Parti Québécois
38th	2007–2008	Éric Laporte	Action démocratique
39th	2008–2012	Scott McKay	Parti Québécois
40th	2012–2014	François Legault	Coalition Avenir Québec
41st	2014–2018	François Legault	Coalition Avenir Québec
42nd	2018–2022	François Legault	Coalition Avenir Québec
43rd	2022–2026	François Legault	Coalition Avenir Québec
44th	2026–Present	Maxime Laporte	Parti Québécois

== Election results ==
2026 Quebec general election
** Preliminary results — Not yet official **
Party	Candidate	Votes	%	±%
Parti Québécois	Maxime Laporte	16,351	41.09	+27.34
Conservative	Patrick Lemieux	7,270	18.27	+10.64
Coalition Avenir Québec	Geneviève Pettersen	6,705	16.85	–41.78
Liberal	Marie-Claire Anglade	5,378	13.52	+7.84
Québec solidaire	Benoit Bourbonnais	3,762	9.45	–4.87
Parti nul	William Mayeu	323	0.81	N/A
Total valid votes		39,789	98.21	–0.36
Total rejected ballots		724	1.79	+0.36
Turnout		40,513	70.82	+0.07
Electors on the lists		57,207		
Parti Québécois gain from Coalition Avenir Québec		Swing		+8.35
Source: Élections Québec

2022 Quebec general election
Party	Candidate	Votes	%	±%
Coalition Avenir Québec	François Legault	18,637	58.63	+1.60
Québec solidaire	Martin Lefebvre	4,553	14.32	-2.64
Parti Québécois	Catherine Provost	4,370	13.75	-0.71
Conservative	Ernesto Almeida	2,424	7.63	+7.08
Liberal	Thomas Ano-Dumas	1,806	5.68	-2.32
Total valid votes		31,790	98.57	–
Total rejected ballots		462	1.43	–
Turnout		32,252	70.75	-1.20
Electors on the lists		45,587	–	–
Coalition Avenir Québec hold		Swing		

2018 Quebec general election
Party	Candidate	Votes	%	±%
Coalition Avenir Québec	François Legault	18,237	57.03	+7.65
Québec solidaire	Marie-Claude Brière	5,425	16.96	+11.16
Parti Québécois	Sylvie Langlois Brouillette	4,625	14.46	-15.98
Liberal	Virginie Bouchard	2,558	8	-5.34
Green	Eve Bellavance	596	1.86	
Citoyens au pouvoir	Sylvie Tougas	363	1.14	
Conservative	Charles-Etienne Everitt-Raynault	175	0.55	+0.1
Total valid votes		31,979	98.23	
Total rejected ballots		575	1.77	
Turnout		32,554	71.95	
Eligible voters		45,248		
Coalition Avenir Québec hold		Swing		-1.76
Source(s) "Rapport des résultats officiels du scrutin". Élections Québec.

2014 Quebec general election
Party	Candidate	Votes	%	±%
Coalition Avenir Québec	François Legault	18,719	49.38	+7.17
Parti Québécois	Pierre Paquette	11,541	30.44	-9.12
Liberal	Jean-Marc Bergevin	5,057	13.34	+1.80
Québec solidaire	Sylvain Fournier	2,198	5.80	+2.20
Option nationale	Gabriel Gauthier	226	0.60	-1.04
Conservative	Charles-Étienne Raynault	169	0.45	–
Total valid votes		37,910	98.37	–
Total rejected ballots		666	1.73	–
Turnout		38,576	73.38	-7.05
Electors on the lists		52,567	–	–
Coalition Avenir Québec hold		Swing		+8.14

2012 Quebec general election
Party	Candidate	Votes	%	±%
Coalition Avenir Québec	François Legault	17,166	42.21	+23.69
Parti Québécois	Lizabel Nitoi	16,088	39.56	-7.78
Liberal	Lise Hébert	4,694	11.54	-16.21
Québec solidaire	Sylvain Fournier	1,465	3.60	+0.54
Option nationale	Evelyne Marcil	667	1.64	–
Green	Christine Lebel	588	1.45	-1.28
Total valid votes		40,668	98.74	–
Total rejected ballots		519	1.26	–
Turnout		41,187	80.43	+17.22
Electors on the lists		51,210	–	–
Coalition Avenir Québec gain from Parti Québécois		Swing		+15.74

^ Change is from redistributed results. CAQ change is from ADQ.

2008 Quebec general election
Party	Candidate	Votes	%	±%
Parti Québécois	Scott McKay	15,438	42.77	+8.84
Liberal	Christian Gauthier	11,348	31.44	+11.89
Action démocratique	Éric Laporte	6,938	19.22	-19.98
Québec solidaire	Olivier Huart	1,090	3.02	-0.07
Green	Chantal Latour	940	2.60	-1.62
Parti indépendantiste	Fanny Bérubé	341	0.94	–
Total valid votes		36,095	98.19	–
Total rejected ballots		666	1.81	–
Turnout		36,761	63.21	-12.95
Electors on the lists		58,156	–	–

2007 Quebec general election
Party	Candidate	Votes	%	±%
Action démocratique	Éric Laporte	16,510	39.20	+21.16
Parti Québécois	Jean-Claude St-André	14,287	33.93	-9.47
Liberal	Benoit Verstraete	8,235	19.55	-16.55
Green	Michel Ménard	1,777	4.22	+2.68
Québec solidaire	Olivier Huart	1,303	3.09	+2.18*
Total valid votes		42,112	99.02	–
Total rejected ballots		415	0.98	–
Turnout		42,527	76.16	+1.00
Electors on the lists		55,838	–	–

* Result compared to UFP

2003 Quebec general election
Party	Candidate	Votes	%	±%
Parti Québécois	Jean-Claude St-André	16,965	43.40	-8.10
Liberal	Sylvie Thouin	14,111	36.10	+10.86
Action démocratique	Daniel Labrecque	7,053	18.04	-3.81
Green	Bob Aubin	602	1.54	–
UFP	Gilbert Morin	356	0.91	–
Total valid votes		39,087	98.61	–
Total rejected ballots		551	1.39	–
Turnout		39,638	75.16	-6.63
Electors on the lists		52,736	–	–

1998 Quebec general election
Party	Candidate	Votes	%	±%
Parti Québécois	Jean-Claude St-André	21,071	51.50	-3.83
Liberal	G. Michel Tremblay	10,326	25.24	-2.36
Action démocratique	Marie Grégoire	8,941	21.85	+5.61
Bloc Pot	Denis Therrien	365	0.89	–
Socialist Democracy	Richard-Olivier Mayer	214	0.52	-0.31
Total valid votes		40,917	99.04	–
Total rejected ballots		397	0.96	–
Turnout		41,314	81.79	+32.82
Electors on the lists		50,513	–	–

Quebec provincial by-election, June 10, 1996
Party	Candidate	Votes	%	±%
Parti Québécois	Jean-Claude St-André	12,931	55.33	-0.71
Liberal	Fernand Prud’homme	6,451	27.60	-0.20
Action démocratique	Robert Landreville	3,795	16.24	+1.02
Socialist Democracy	Jocelyne Dupuis	195	0.83	–
Total valid votes		23,372	98.15	–
Total rejected ballots		440	1.85	–
Turnout		23,812	48.97	-36.63
Electors on the lists		48,626	–	–

1995 Quebec referendum
Side	Votes	%
Oui	29,095	63.65
Non	16,614	36.35

1994 Quebec general election
Party	Candidate	Votes	%	±%
Parti Québécois	Jacques Parizeau	21,809	56.04	+0.52
Liberal	Luc Archambault	10,817	27.80	-12.39
Action démocratique	Éric Boisselle	5,925	15.22	–
Natural Law	Lisette Proulx	366	0.94	–
Total valid votes		38,917	98.12	–
Total rejected ballots		744	1.88	–
Turnout		39,661	85.60	+5.33
Electors on the lists		46,334	–	–

1992 Charlottetown Accord referendum
Side	Votes	%
Non	28,287	70.78
Oui	11,677	29.22

1989 Quebec general election
Party	Candidate	Votes	%	±%
Parti Québécois	Jacques Parizeau	18,590	55.52	+14.16
Liberal	Jean-Guy Gervais	13,456	40.19	-1.74
Green	Bryan Speight	1,439	4.30	–
Total valid votes		33,485	97.76	–
Total rejected ballots		766	2.24	–
Turnout		34,251	80.27	+3.21
Electors on the lists		42,670	–	–

1985 Quebec general election
Party	Candidate	Votes	%	±%
Liberal	Jean-Guy Gervais	15,627	41.93	-4.78
Parti Québécois	Bernard Bastien	15,411	41.36	+21.42
Progressive Conservative	André Asselin	5,429	14.57	-17.22
Parti indépendantiste	Yves Senécal	422	1.13	–
Union Nationale	Pierre-Bernard Labelle	273	0.73	–
United Social Credit	Hervé Bélisle	103	0.28	-0.61
Total valid votes		37,265	98.44	–
Total rejected ballots		590	1.56	–
Turnout		37,855	77.06	+21.98
Electors on the lists		49,127	–	–

Quebec provincial by-election, June 3, 1985
Party	Candidate	Votes	%	±%
Liberal	Jean-Guy Gervais	12,019	46.71	+13.59
Progressive Conservative	André Asselin	8,180	31.79	–
Parti Québécois	Denis Taillon	5,131	19.94	-41.67
United Social Credit	Jean-Paul Poulin	229	0.89	–
Republic of Canada	Jacques Lambert	174	0.68	–
Total valid votes		25,733	97.03	–
Total rejected ballots		789	2.97	–
Turnout		26,522	55.08	-31.96
Electors on the lists		48,148	–	–

1981 Quebec general election
Party	Candidate	Votes	%	±%
Parti Québécois	Jacques Parizeau	22,605	61.61	+7.12
Liberal	André Ouellette	12,150	33.12	+8.38
Union Nationale	Paul Marsan	1,934	5.27	-11.53
Total valid votes		36,689	98.82	–
Total rejected ballots		439	1.18	–
Turnout		37,128	87.04	-2.20
Electors on the lists		42,657	–	–

1980 Quebec referendum
Side	Votes	%
Oui	30,125	51.14
Non	28,786	48.86

== See also ==
- List of Quebec provincial electoral districts
- Canadian provincial electoral districts
