= L'Épiphanie, Quebec (parish) =

L'Épiphanie
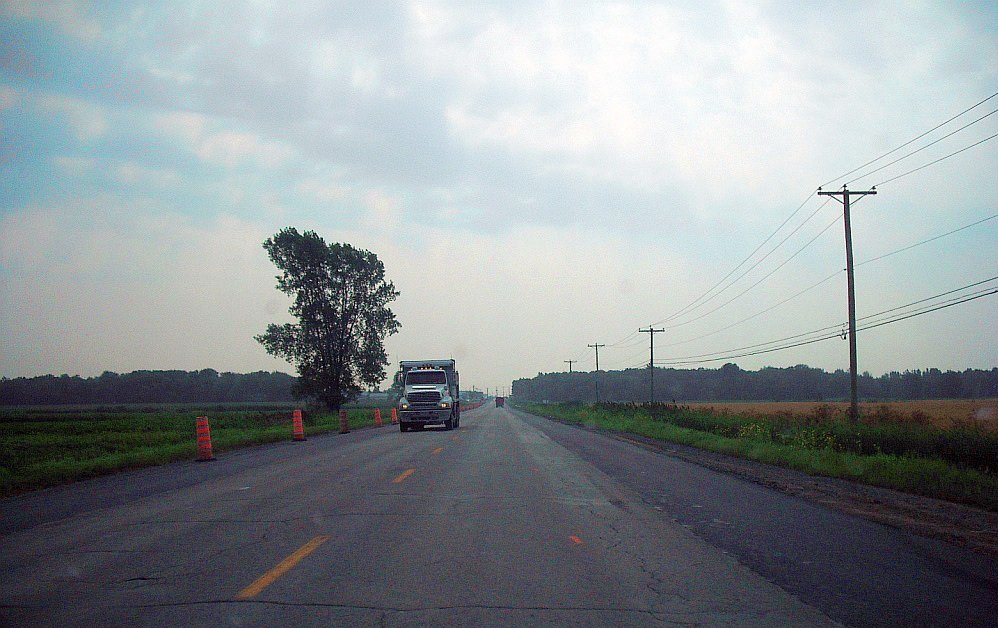

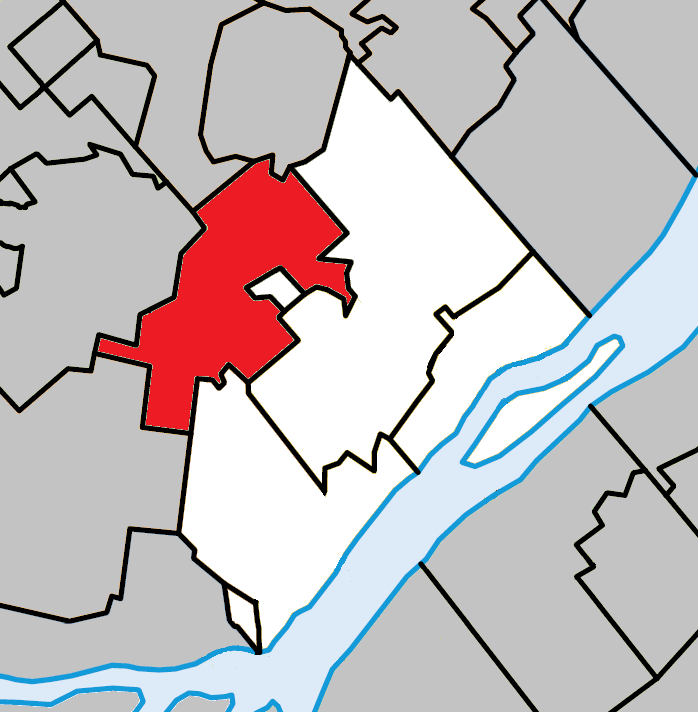
- Location within L'Assomption RCM.

- Location in central Quebec.
- Coordinates: 45°51′N 73°29′W
- Country: Canada
- Province: Quebec
- Region: Lanaudière
- RCM: L'Assomption
- Constituted: July 1, 1855
- Dissolved: May 23, 2018

Government
  - Mayor: Denis Lévesque
  - Federal riding: Repentigny
  - Prov. riding: L'Assomption

Area
  - Total: 55.80 km^{2} (21.54 sq mi)
  - Land: 54.22 km^{2} (20.93 sq mi)

Population (2011)
  - Total: 3,296
  - Density: 60.8/km^{2} (157/sq mi)
  - Pop 2006–2011: ▲5.3%
  - Dwellings: 1,307
- Time zone: UTC−5 (EST)
  - Summer (DST): UTC−4 (EDT)
- Postal code(s): J5X 1E1
- Area codes: 450 and 579
- Highways: R-339; R-341
- Website: www.paroisse-lepiphanie.com

L'Épiphanie (French pronunciation: [lepifani]) is a former parish municipality in the Lanaudière region of Quebec, Canada, part of the L'Assomption Regional County Municipality.

On May 23, 2018, the parish ceased to exist when it was merged into the Town of L'Épiphanie.

A group of Acadians settled in the area around 1766, after mills constructed along the L'Achigan River had attracted merchants, artisans and farmers.

== Demographics ==
Population trend:

- Population in 2011: 3296 (2006 to 2011 population change: 5.3%)
- Population in 2006: 3129
- Population in 2001: 2931
- Population in 1996: 2739
- Population in 1991: 2421

Private dwellings occupied by usual residents: 1,212 (total dwellings: 1,307)

Mother tongue:

- English as first language: 0%
- French as first language: 96.5%
- English and French as first language: 1%
- Other as first language: 2.5%

== Education ==
The Sir Wilfrid Laurier School Board operates anglophone public schools, including:

- Joliette Elementary School in Saint-Charles-Borromée
