= Onuphe Peltier =

Canadian politician

Member of the Legislative Assembly of Quebec for L'Assomption
- In office 1871–1880
- Preceded by: Étienne Mathieu
- Succeeded by: Joseph Marion

Personal details
- Born: November 13, 1821 Saint-Pierre, near Joliette, Lower Canada
- Died: May 10, 1880 (aged 58) L'Épiphanie, Quebec
- Party: Conservative

Onuphe Peltier (November 13, 1821 – May 10, 1880) was an entrepreneur and political figure in Quebec. He represented L'Assomption in the Legislative Assembly of Quebec from 1871 to 1880 as a Conservative.

He was born in Saint-Pierre, Lower Canada, the son of Jean-Baptiste Peltier and Charlotte Cadot. He was educated at L'Assomption and established himself in business at L'Épiphanie. In 1842, he married Marie-Angèle Magnan. Peltier was mayor of L'Épiphanie from 1863 to 1869. He died in office there at the age of 58.
