= Alice Parizeau =

Polish born Quebec journalist

Alice Parizeau OC
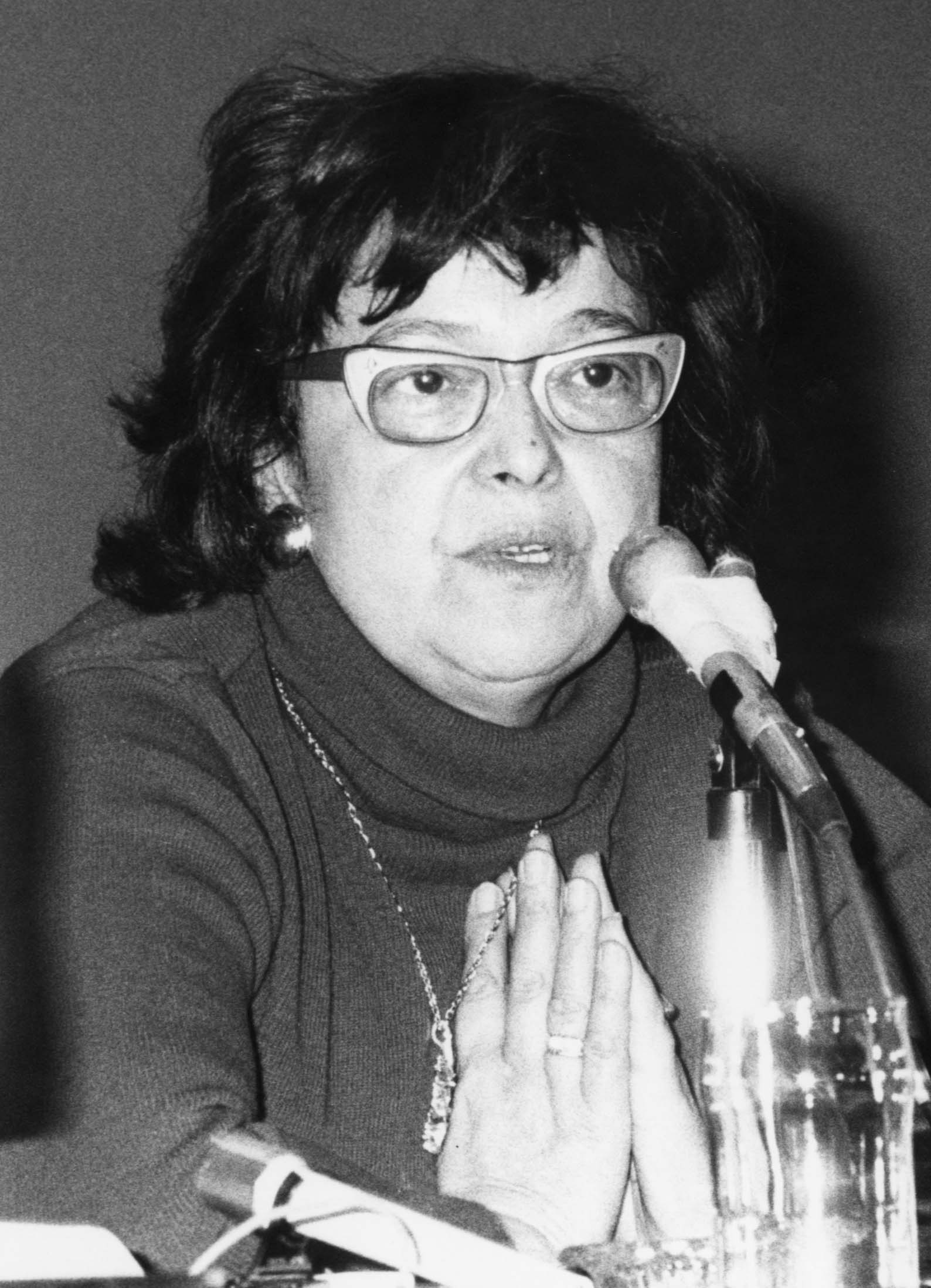
- Born: July 25, 1930
- Died: September 30, 1990 (aged 60)

Alice Parizeau OC (née Alicja Poznańska; 25 July 1930 – 30 September 1990) was a Polish-Canadian writer, essayist, journalist and criminologist.

== Early life ==
Her parents were Stanislaw Poznański (1894–1943) and Rebeka (Bronislawa Breina) Kestenberg (1892–1943) Polish Jews murdered in the Holocaust, both in Otwock, Poland according to the testimony of Kestenberg's brother, Yehuda Adam Kestenberg, recorded in Yad Vashem. Stanislaw Poznański was the son of Karol Poznański and grandson of Izrael Poznański, a famous Polish-Jewish businessman, textile magnate and philanthropist (Philanthropy) in Łódź.

Born in Łuniniec, Poland, as a young girl Poznańska was associated with the Polish Home Army during the 1944 Warsaw Uprising during World War II, which led to her internment in the Bergen-Belsen prisoner of war camp and her receipt of a war medal following the war.

Following the war Poznańska went to Paris to study at the Sorbonne, earning degrees in literature, law and political science. In 1955, she visited a friend from the Sorbonne in Quebec, where she accepted a short contract which would turn into a lifelong stay. She married economist and politician Jacques Parizeau the following year.

Though of Jewish background, and interned in Bergen Belsen during the Holocaust, Alice Poznanska's funeral was held at a Catholic church.

== Career ==
As a Quebecer, Parizeau was strongly associated with Montreal's intellectual and sovereigntist scenes, respectively. While best known as a novelist and journalist — she wrote for Cité libre, La Presse, Châtelaine, Le Devoir, La Patrie and Maclean's — Parizeau held a number of other positions. These included civil servant with the City of Montreal, researcher for Société Radio-Canada and, most notably, criminology researcher, lecturer and secretary-general of the Centre international de criminologie comparée at the Université de Montréal, where she served for many years as the de facto assistant director to Denis Szabo, founder of modern criminology in Quebec.

Parizeau's writing was known for its outstanding storytelling and sensitive treatment of themes relating both to the Quebec people, which she portrayed in romantic terms congruent with the sovereignty movement's ideals, and life in and exile from Poland. She won the Prix européen de l'Association des écrivains de langue française in 1982 for her novel Les lilas fleurissent à Varsovie (translated as The Lilacs are Blooming in Warsaw). In 1987, she was made an Officer of the Order of Canada. Many members of the Quebec sovereignty movement, including the press, criticised her for accepting an honour from the Governor General of Canada.

== Memorials ==
In 1990, Parizeau died of cancer in Outremont, Quebec, leaving her husband, Jacques, and two children, Isabelle, a lawyer, and Bernard, a doctor. The École Alice Parizeau in Montreal and the Bibliothèque Alice-Parizeau in Saint-Esprit, Quebec were named in her honour.

== Works ==
- Les solitudes humaines (1962)
- Voyage en Pologne (1963)
- Fuir (1963)
- Survivre (1964)
- Une Québécoise en Europe rouge (1965)
- Rue Sherbrooke Ouest (1967)
- Les lilas fleurissent à Varsovie (1981)
- Côte-des-Neiges (1983)
- Blizzard sur Québec (1987)

== See also ==
- Culture of Quebec
- List of Quebec authors
- Literature of Quebec

== Sources ==
- (in French) "PARIZEAU, ALICE", in Dictionnaire des auteurs de langue française en Amérique du Nord, 1989
- http://www.cjnews.com/perspectives/opinions/jacques-parizeaus-legacy-divides-us
- http://www.iforum.umontreal.ca/Forum/ArchivesForum/2001-2002/020318/article910.htm
