= Robert Lussier =

Canadian politician

Member of the Legislative Assembly of Quebec for L'Assomption
- In office 1966–1970
- Preceded by: Frédéric Coiteux
- Succeeded by: Jean Perreault

Personal details
- Born: December 31, 1924 Richmond, Quebec, Canada
- Died: March 19, 1994 (aged 69)
- Party: Union Nationale

Robert Lussier (December 31, 1924 – March 19, 1994) was a Canadian politician and a Member of the Legislative Assembly of Quebec.

== Background ==
He was born on December 31, 1924, in Richmond, Eastern Townships and became a physician. He was married to Ginette Bruneau in 1952.

== Mayor ==
Lussier served as Mayor of Repentigny, Lanaudière from 1960 to 1968.

== Member of the Provincial Legislature ==
He ran as a Union Nationale candidate to the Legislative Assembly of Quebec in the provincial district of L'Assomption in the 1966 election and won against Liberal incumbent Frédéric Coiteux. He served as a parliamentary assistant in 1967 and was appointed to the Cabinet in the same year. He served as Minister of Municipal Affairs until his defeat against Liberal candidate Jean Perreault in the 1970 election.

== Parti Québécois Supporter ==
In the 1970s, Lussier became a Parti Québécois activist and held executive jobs within the party structure. He was a mayoral candidate in Repentigny in 1977, but was defeated.

== Death ==
He died on March 19, 1994.
