= Sainte-Croix, Quebec =

Sainte-Croix
- Municipality
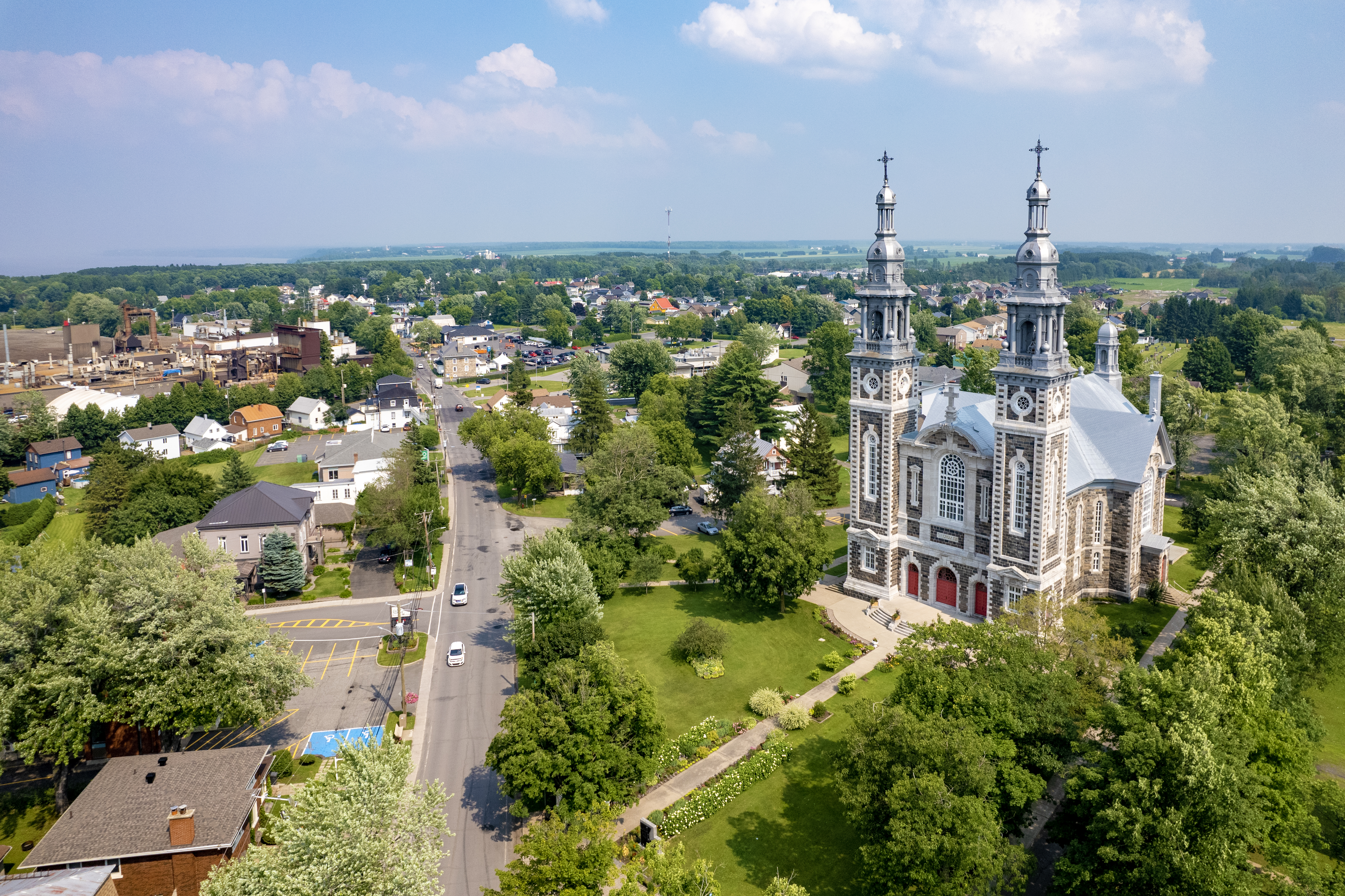
- Aerial view of Sainte-Croix

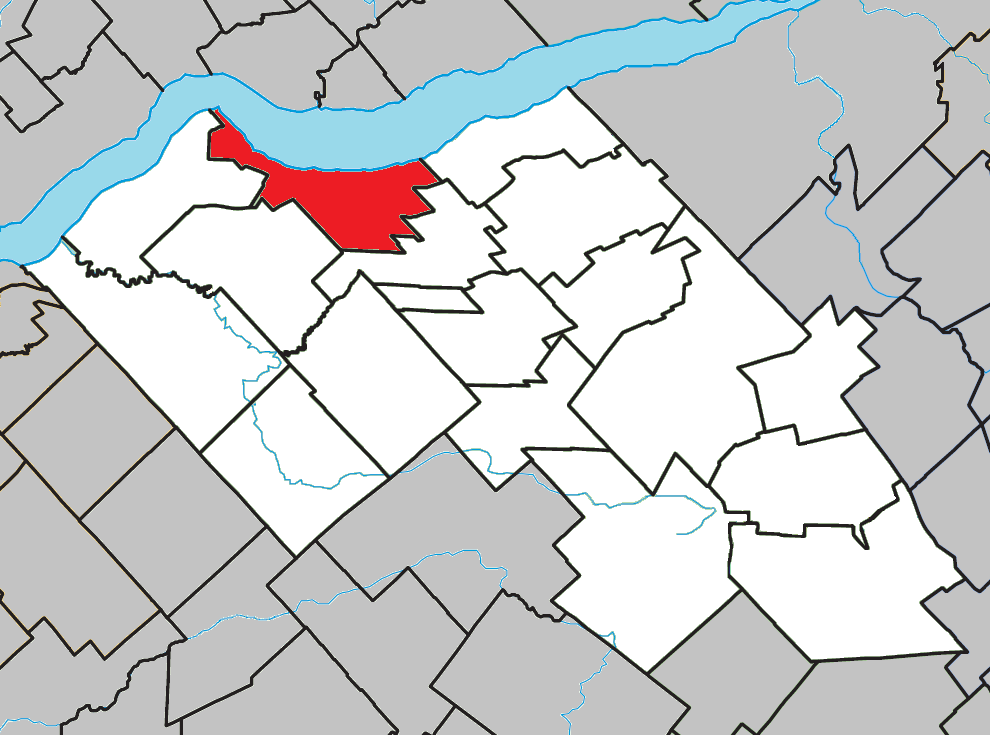
- Location within Lotbinière RCM

- Location in southern Quebec
- Coordinates: 46°37′N 71°44′W
- Country: Canada
- Province: Quebec
- Region: Chaudière-Appalaches
- RCM: Lotbinière
- Constituted: October 5, 2001

Government
  - Mayor: Stéphane Dion
  - Federal riding: Mégantic—L'Érable—Lotbinière
  - Prov. riding: Lotbinière-Frontenac

Area
  - Municipality: 72.40 km^{2} (27.95 sq mi)
  - Land: 69.54 km^{2} (26.85 sq mi)
  - Urban: 2.29 km^{2} (0.88 sq mi)

Population (2021)
  - Municipality: 2,352
  - Density: 33.8/km^{2} (88/sq mi)
  - Urban: 1,424
  - Urban density: 620.9/km^{2} (1,608/sq mi)
  - Pop 2016-2021: ▲0.5%
  - Dwellings: 1,148
- Time zone: UTC−5 (EST)
  - Summer (DST): UTC−4 (EDT)
- Postal code(s): G0S 2H0
- Area codes: 418 and 581
- Highways: R-132; R-271
- Website: ville-sainte-croix.ca

Sainte-Croix (French pronunciation: [sɛ̃t kʁwa]) is a municipality in and the seat of Lotbinière Regional County Municipality in Quebec, Canada. It is part of the Chaudière-Appalaches region had a population is 2,352 as of 2021. The new constitution dates from 2001, after the amalgamation of the Parish of and the Village of Sainte-Croix.

Its name refers to the True Cross but had been in use well before its foundation in 1713. In fact, the seigneurie of Sainte-Croix was granted in 1637 to the Company of One Hundred Associates at a point named Platon Sainte-Croix (Holy Cross Flats in English), at the mouth of the Jacques-Cartier River. It had been named as such by Jacques Cartier, who had spent the winter of 1535-1536 there. Samuel de Champlain explained in 1613 that there had been a mistake and was not the place that Cartier had wintered, which was a point that is now called Pointe Platon ("Plato (or Flat) Point").

== History ==
The seigneury of Sainte-Croix was one of the first fifteen seigneuries to be granted in New France. It was granted on January 16, 1637, by the Compagnie des Cent-Associés, under Henri de Lévis. It was granted to the Ursulines of Quebec. Father Jérôme Lalemant took symbolic possession of the seigneury on 14 September 1647 on their behalf. He erected boundary stones on the feast of the exaltation of the Holy Cross, which commemorated the invention, in the sense of the discovery, of the true cross, reconquered from the Persians in 628. The parish's toponym is derived from this festival.

The first settlers arrived around 1680, including the family of Louis Houde on 13 February 1682, who was then living on the Île d'Orléans. He acquired nine arpents of land on a plateau by the river from the Ursulines of Quebec. A first chapel was built in 1694 near the river on land donated by Louis Houde. A second church was built in 1732 on the main road. Settlement of the seigneury was slow, as the only road was the river's navigable waterway. The Chemin du Roy was opened to traffic as far as the seigneury in 1718.

On the banks of the river, the Ursulines built their first flour mill in 1754, which remained in operation until the construction of another mill in 1801 at the top of the hill.

The parish was canonically erected in 1721, but civilly erected in 1845.

In 1846, Pierre-Gustave Joly, seigneur of the seigneury of Lotbinière, purchased part of the land of Pointe-Platon from the Ursulines, a point of land bordering the seigneuries of Lotbinière and Sainte-Croix on the St. Lawrence River. He had a manor house built there, to be known as Maple House in 1851, and used it as a summer residence.

The municipality of Sainte-Croix we know today was created in 2001 when the village and the parish were merged to form the new municipality.

== Geography ==
=== Climate ===
Climate data for Sainte-Croix (1971−2010 normals, extremes 1954–present)
Month	Jan	Feb	Mar	Apr	May	Jun	Jul	Aug	Sep	Oct	Nov	Dec	Year
Record high °C (°F)	11.0 (51.8)	15.0 (59.0)	18.3 (64.9)	29.0 (84.2)	33.3 (91.9)	34.5 (94.1)	35.0 (95.0)	34.0 (93.2)	34.0 (93.2)	26.1 (79.0)	22.5 (72.5)	14.0 (57.2)	35.0 (95.0)
Mean daily maximum °C (°F)	−7.6 (18.3)	−4.5 (23.9)	0.9 (33.6)	9.2 (48.6)	17.5 (63.5)	22.6 (72.7)	25.0 (77.0)	23.9 (75.0)	18.9 (66.0)	11.5 (52.7)	3.8 (38.8)	−3.1 (26.4)	9.8 (49.6)
Daily mean °C (°F)	−12.3 (9.9)	−9.6 (14.7)	−3.9 (25.0)	4.4 (39.9)	11.8 (53.2)	17.1 (62.8)	19.7 (67.5)	18.6 (65.5)	13.9 (57.0)	7.3 (45.1)	0.5 (32.9)	−6.8 (19.8)	5.1 (41.2)
Mean daily minimum °C (°F)	−17 (1)	−14.7 (5.5)	−8.7 (16.3)	−0.5 (31.1)	6.1 (43.0)	11.5 (52.7)	14.4 (57.9)	13.2 (55.8)	8.9 (48.0)	3.1 (37.6)	−2.8 (27.0)	−10.5 (13.1)	0.3 (32.5)
Record low °C (°F)	−37.8 (−36.0)	−37.2 (−35.0)	−31 (−24)	−18.9 (−2.0)	−6.7 (19.9)	0.0 (32.0)	3.3 (37.9)	0.6 (33.1)	−5 (23)	−10.6 (12.9)	−22.2 (−8.0)	−36 (−33)	−37.8 (−36.0)
Average relative humidity (%) (at 15:00 LST)	77.3	76.0	74.6	72.5	72.5	74.2	76.4	76.9	77.8	78.6	77.0	79.4	76.1
Source: Environment and Climate Change Canada

== Demographics ==
In the 2021 Census of Population conducted by Statistics Canada, Sainte-Croix had a population of 2,529 living in 1,125 of its 1,287 total private dwellings, a change of 0.5% from its 2016 population of 2,516. With a land area of 69.63 km^{2} (26.88 sq mi), it had a population density of 36.3/km^{2} (94.1/sq mi) in 2021.

Canada census – Sainte-Croix community profile

	2021	2016
Population	2,529 (+0.5% from 2016)	2,516 (+7.0%% from 2011)
Land area	69.63 km^{2} (26.88 sq mi)	69.86 km^{2} (26.97 sq mi)
Population density	36.3/km^{2} (94/sq mi)	36.0/km^{2} (93/sq mi)
Median age	50.4 (M: 47.2, F: 53.2)	50.8 (M: 48.5, F: 52.7)
Private dwellings	1,287 (total) 1,125 (occupied)	1,274 (total)
Median household income	$62,800	$56,192

References: 2021 2016

== Economy ==
South Shore Furniture is based in Sainte-Croix and has a factory in the municipality.
