= Joseph Marion =

Canadian politician

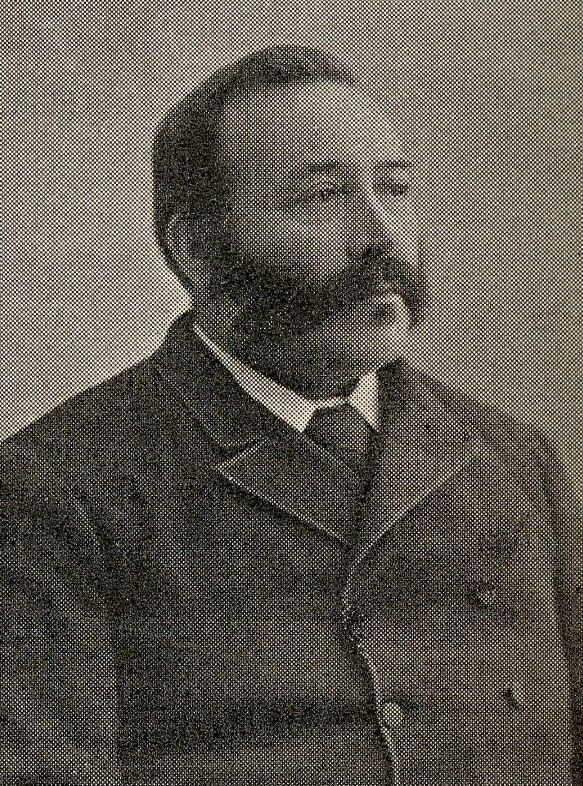
Joseph Marion

Joseph Marion (December 3, 1837 – October 18, 1923) was a notary and political figure in Quebec. He represented L'Assomption in the Legislative

Assembly of Quebec from 1880 to 1886 and from 1890 to 1900 as a Conservative.

He was born in Repentigny, Lower Canada, the son of Joseph Marion and Louise Brousseau, and was educated there, at the Collège de l'Assomption and the Université Laval. He qualified as a notary in 1863 and set up practice in Saint-Paul-l'Ermite (later Le Gardeur). He also served as postmaster and was secretary-treasurer for the municipality for 30 years and mayor for eight years. In 1864 he married Luce Archambault. He was first elected to the Quebec assembly in an 1880 by-election held after the death of Onuphe Peltier. He was defeated by Ludger Forest when he ran for reelection in 1886 and again in 1888. Marion was defeated by Joseph-Édouard Duhamel in 1900.
