= Jacques Parizeau =

Premier of Quebec from 1994 to 1996

Jacques Parizeau GOQ
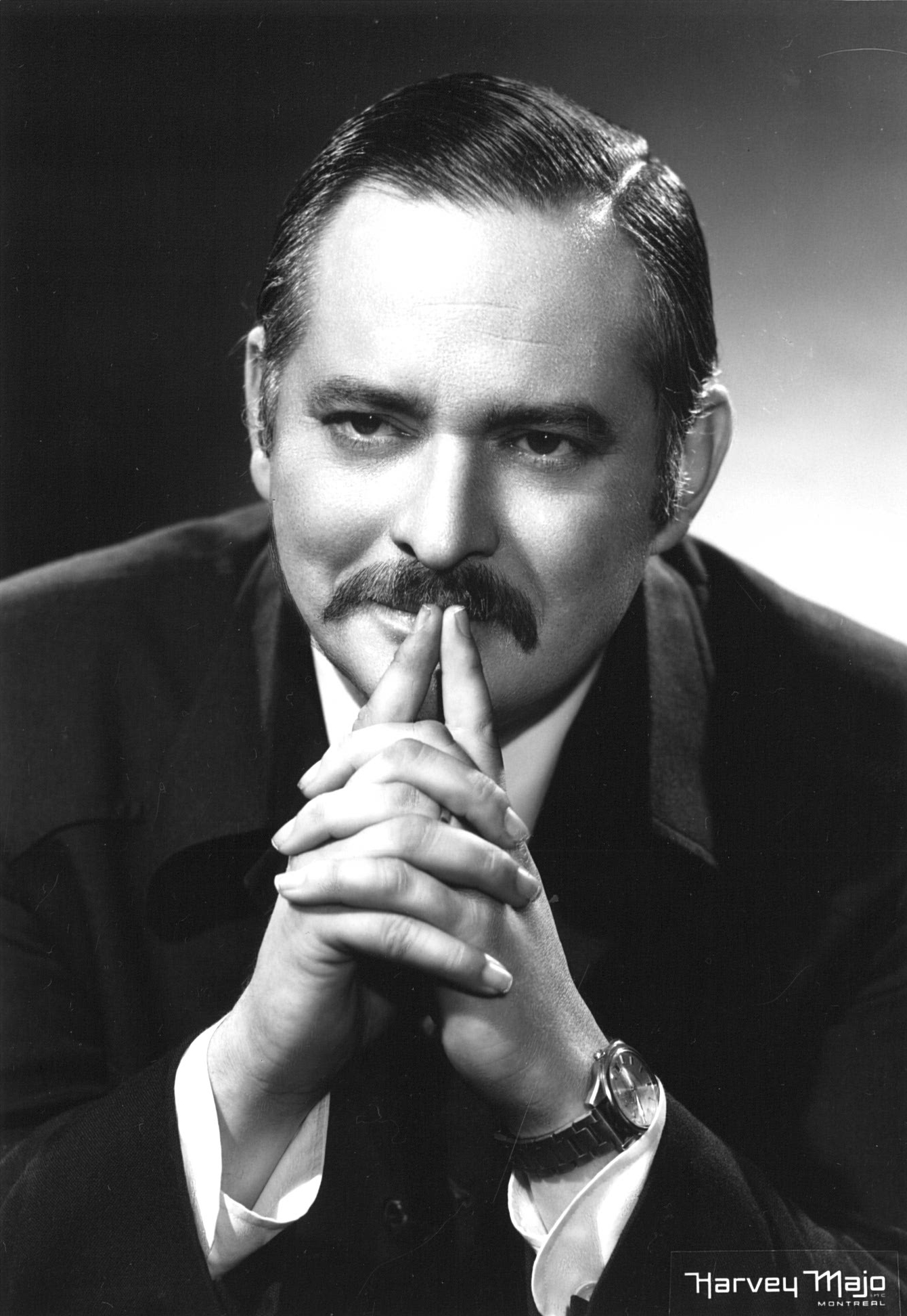
- Parizeau in 1976

26th Premier of Quebec
- In office September 26, 1994 – January 29, 1996
- Monarch: Elizabeth II
- Lieutenant Governor: Martial Asselin
- Deputy: Bernard Landry
- Preceded by: Daniel Johnson Jr.
- Succeeded by: Lucien Bouchard

Leader of the Opposition of Quebec
- In office September 25, 1989 – September 26, 1994
- Preceded by: Guy Chevrette
- Succeeded by: Daniel Johnson Jr.

President of the Parti Québécois
- In office March 18, 1988 – January 27, 1996
- First Vice-President: Pauline Marois; Bernard Landry; Monique Simard
- Preceded by: Guy Chevrette (interim)
- Succeeded by: Lucien Bouchard

Minister of Finance
- In office November 26, 1976 – November 27, 1984
- Premier: René Lévesque
- Preceded by: Raymond Garneau
- Succeeded by: Yves Duhaime
Parliamentary constituencies
Member of the National Assembly of Quebec for L'Assomption
In office September 25, 1989 – January 29, 1996
Preceded by	Jean-Guy Gervais
Succeeded by	Jean-Claude St-André
In office November 15, 1976 – November 27, 1984
Preceded by	Jean Perreault
Succeeded by	Jean-Guy Gervais

Personal details
- Born: August 9, 1930 Montreal, Quebec, Canada
- Died: June 1, 2015 (aged 84) Montreal, Quebec, Canada
- Party: Parti Québécois
- Spouses: Alice Poznanska (m. 1956; died 1990); Lisette Lapointe
- Education: HEC Montréal; Sciences Po; London School of Economics; Faculté de droit de Paris
- Profession: Economist

Jacques Parizeau GOQ (French pronunciation: [ʒɑk paʁizo]; August 9, 1930 – June 1, 2015) was a Canadian politician and economist who served as the 26th premier of Quebec from September 26, 1994, to January 29, 1996.

== Early life and career ==
Parizeau was born in Montreal, Quebec, the son of Germaine (née Biron) and Gérard Parizeau, from a family of wealth. Gérard Parizeau built one of Quebec's great fortunes and one of the province's largest financial firms from a brokerage he established in the 1930s. Jacques' great-grandfather was a founder of the Montreal Chambre de Commerce and his grandfather was a doctor of renown and a Chevalier of the Légion d’honneur.

As a teenager, Parizeau had radical views and distributed leaflets for Communist Fred Rose's election campaigns. While sympathetic to the Labor-Progressive Party he never joined.

His parents supported bilingualism and sent him to English summer camp. He attended Collège Stanislas, a Roman Catholic private school. He went on to graduate with a PhD (in 1955 under the supervision of James Meade) from the London School of Economics in London, England, as well as degrees at HEC Montréal, Paris Institute of Political Studies and Faculté de droit de Paris. Because of a prior commitment to return to instruct at HEC, he left England, where career opportunities were offered in British academia. He served an internship with the Bank of Canada in Ottawa, and directed his brightest students to Queen's University in Kingston, Ontario for postgraduate studies.

A firm believer in economic interventionism, he was one of the most important advisors to the provincial government during the 1960s, playing an important behind-the-scenes role in the Quiet Revolution. He was especially instrumental in the nationalization of Hydro-Québec (a hydro-electric utility) in 1962-1963, the nationalization of the Asbestos Corporation Limited mines in 1982, and worked with Eric Kierans to create the Quebec Pension Plan in 1963-1966.

He joked that the Quiet Revolution was essentially carried out by three or four cabinet ministers, two dozen civil servants and 50 chansonniers. (At the end of his career, he said that he would like to be remembered most for his contributions to the reformation of Quebec.)

Parizeau gradually became a committed sovereigntist, and officially joined the Parti Québécois (PQ) on September 19, 1969. In 1970, he became the president of the PQ's executive council until 1973. He stood for office in the Montreal districts of Ahuntsic in 1970 and Crémazie in 1973, but lost in both.

After the PQ was elected to office in the 1976 provincial election, which saw Parizeau elected in the district of L'Assomption, the new premier, René Lévesque, appointed him as Minister of Finance. Parizeau played an important role in the 1980 Quebec referendum campaign in favour of the government's proposals for sovereignty-association.

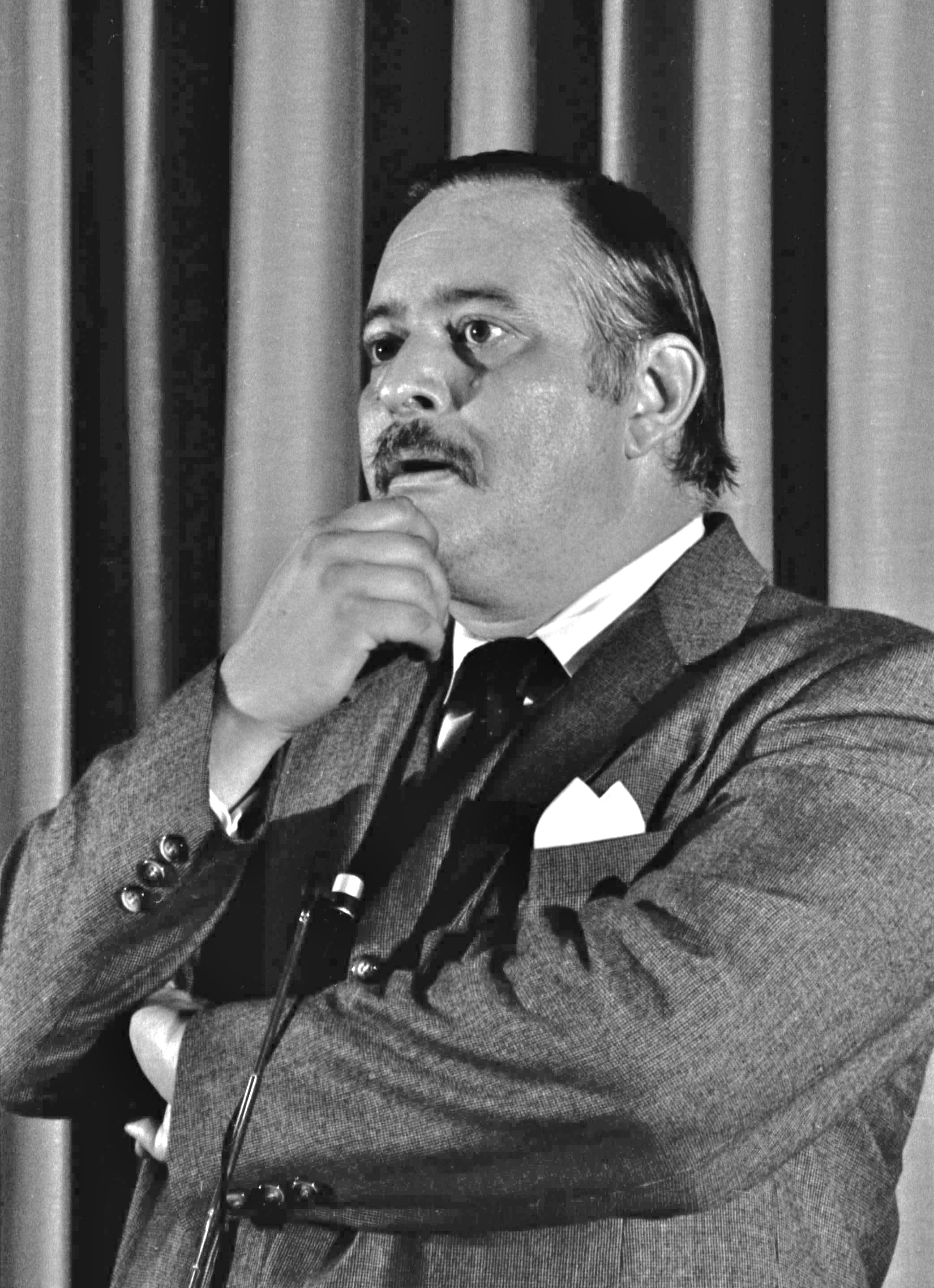
Parizeau at a 1981 conference at Laval University

As Minister of Finance in Quebec, he was responsible for a number of innovative economic proposals, including the Quebec Stock Savings Plan ("QSSP") and the Fonds de solidarité (Solidarity Fund) FTQ in 1983. As of May 2020, the latter's net assets were $13.8 billion.

Parizeau was married to Polish immigrant Alice Poznanska (1930–1990). He was criticized for supporting the Charter of the French Language. This law limits access to English-language public schools to children whose parents didn't receive their education in English in Canada, and was generally opposed by the English-speaking minority.

In 1984, he had a falling out with Lévesque. Lévesque had moved away from pursuing sovereignty to accept a negotiation with the Federal Government, called Beau Risque. Parizeau opposed this shift, resigned from Cabinet along with many other members, and temporarily retired from politics. Lévesque was taken by surprise with all these retirements and retired soon after. He was replaced by Pierre-Marc Johnson.

In 1987, Johnson also left the PQ leadership after losing the 1985 election. Parizeau, still a widely liked figure, was elected to replace him as party leader on March 19, 1988.

It was revealed in 2013 that federal Prime Minister Brian Mulroney offered in 1987 to appoint Parizeau as an independent Senator in his attempt to secure passage of the Canada–United States Free Trade Agreement through the upper house as well as part of his strategy to achieve reconciliation with Quebec sovereigntists which led to the Meech Lake Accord. Parizeau rejected Mulroney's offer. During the 1988 Canadian Federal Election, Parizeau backed the Free Trade Agreement. His support, along with Bernard Landry played a role in Mulroney's dominance in Quebec during the election.

== Elections, 1995 referendum and aftermath ==
In the 1989 election, Parizeau's first as PQ leader, his party did not fare well. In 1993, after the Charlottetown Accord failed to pass, Parizeau proclaimed that sovereignty could be achieved without Anglophones and Allophones of Quebec. Gérald Godin, a former PQ Minister of Immigration and Cultural Communities, was infuriated of Parizeau's comment by telling Le Devoir that the comment 'scraped' previous effort of outreach done by the PQ.

A year later, in the 1994 election, it won a majority government. Parizeau promised to hold a referendum on Quebec sovereignty within a year of his election, and despite many objections, he followed through on this promise. In the beginning, support for sovereignty was only about 40% in the public opinion polls. As the campaign wore on, however, support for the "Yes" side grew larger. This growth halted, however, and Parizeau came under pressure to hand more of the campaign over to the more moderate and conservative Lucien Bouchard, the popular leader of the federal Bloc Québécois party. Parizeau agreed and as the campaign progressed he lost his leadership role to Bouchard.

During the 1995 referendum he caused an uproar when it was reported by columnist Chantal Hébert in the La Presse newspaper that despite the guarantee of an offer of partnership with the rest of Canada before declaring sovereignty following a "Yes" vote, Parizeau had told a group of foreign diplomats that what mattered most was to get a majority vote from Quebec citizens for the proposal to secede from Canada because with that, Quebecers would be in a "lobster pot," evidently indicating that like lobsters in a lobster trap, Quebecers would not be able to escape the consequences of a vote for independence once it was cast. The "Yes" side would lose the referendum by 55,000 votes. In his concession speech, Parizeau said sovereignty had been defeated by "l'argent pis des votes ethniques" ("money and ethnic votes"), and referred to the Francophones who voted Yes in the referendum as "nous" (us) when he said that this majority group was, for the first time, no longer afraid of political independence.

Many suspected he may have been drinking. He resigned as PQ leader and Quebec premier the next day. The English-language media, as well as non-sovereigntist newspapers such as La Presse and Le Soleil, associated Parizeau's resignation only with these remarks, against which the sovereigntist-friendly media (notably the newspaper Le Devoir) argued that he had made the decision beforehand, drawing attention to a television interview conducted on the eve of the vote with the Groupe TVA channel in which Parizeau spoke of his intentions to step down in the event of defeat. (This interview had previously been held under "embargo", which is to say that the station agreed not to broadcast it until the referendum was over.)

Parizeau was replaced by Lucien Bouchard as PQ leader and Quebec premier on January 29, 1996.

Parizeau retired to private life, but continued to make comments critical of Bouchard's new government and its failure to press the cause of Quebec independence. He owned an estate at his vineyard in France, a farm in the Eastern Townships of Quebec and a home in Montreal. His biographer is Pierre Duchesne.

In 2005 he spoke of the 1995 referendum in the Canadian Broadcasting Corporation documentary Breaking Point.

His wife and former secretary during his premiership, Lisette Lapointe won a seat in the National Assembly as a candidate for the PQ in the provincial riding of Crémazie in the 2007 Quebec general election.

In June 2008, along with the other four living former Premiers of Quebec, Parizeau was named a Grand Officer of the National Order of Quebec by Premier Jean Charest.

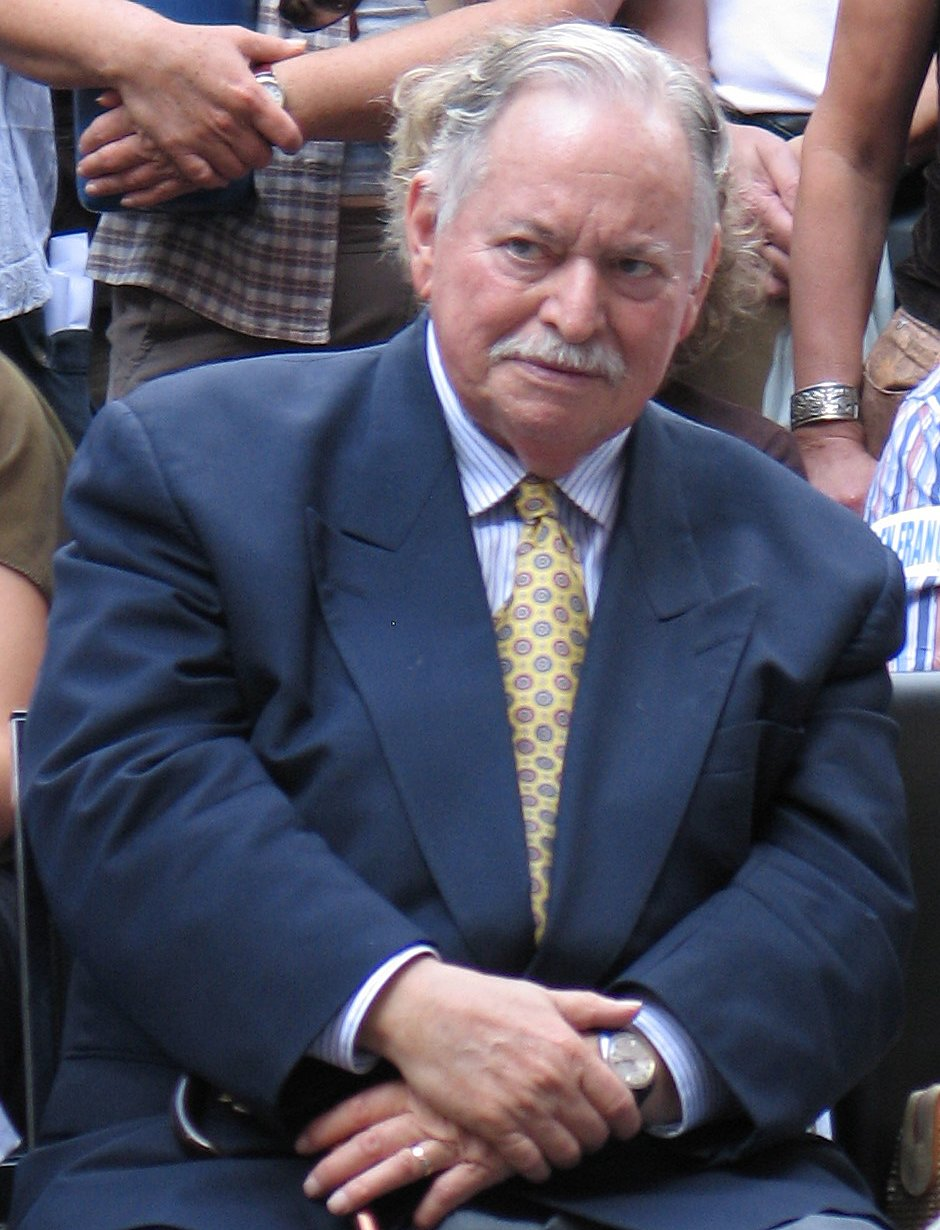
Parizeau in 2007

At a 2013 meeting of Option nationale, Parizeau stated to the room that the target of sovereignty for Quebec is still realizable, and that the PQ should make the maximum effort to attain it, including using public funds.

In October 2013, to the surprise of many Quebecers, Parizeau nuanced his earlier infamous "money and ethnic votes" statement to come out against the wholesale adoption of the Quebec Charter of Values, which would have banned most religious symbols and clothing in the public sector (but not the crucifix over the National Assembly President's chair). "Federalism is turning into true defenders of minorities in Quebec," he said to Radio-Canada at the time. "We can't put ourselves in a situation like that." By "we", he meant the Franco-Quebecois, the majority in Quebec, and who had voted in the majority for sovereignty.

In an interview with CHMP 98.5 FM, Jacques Parizeau clarified the controversial comments he made in a 1995 speech following the sovereignty referendum's yes-side loss. He said that when he laid blame for the loss, he said "ethnic votes" and not the ethnic vote, and was referring to a coalition of Greek, Italian, and Jewish organizations which actively campaigned on the "no" side.

Parizeau let his PQ membership lapse and supported the fledgling party Option nationale and its youthful leader Jean-Martin Aussant. After Pierre Karl Péladeau entered provincial politics, Parizeau publicly decried the state of the PQ. In September 2014, after the party's defeat in the general election, he stated that it faced "a field of ruin." During the PQ leadership campaign of 2015, Parizeau told Radio-Canada in his last televised interview that "the party was gradually demolished and it has lost its soul."

== Death ==
In a social media posting, Parizeau's wife announced his death after five months of hospitalization, on June 1, 2015. He was 84. On her Facebook page, Lapointe wrote:

The man of my life is gone. In peace, surrounded by love. After a titanic battle, hospitalized for five months, through one ordeal after another, with an uncommon courage. He surrendered tonight… We are devastated. We love him and will love him forever.

His state funeral mass was held at Saint-Germain d'Outremont Roman Catholic church, the Parizeau family parish.

== See also ==
- Parti Québécois Crisis, 1984
- Politics of Quebec
- List of Quebec premiers
- List of Quebec general elections
- Timeline of Quebec history
- Sovereignty Association
- History of the Quebec sovereigntist movement
- Politician and personality nicknaming in Quebec
- Pur et dur
- List of celebrities who own wineries and vineyards
