= Éric Laporte =

Canadian politician (born 1976)

MNA for L'Assomption
- In office March 26, 2007 – December 8, 2008
- Preceded by: Jean-Claude St-André
- Succeeded by: Scott McKay

Personal details
- Born: January 24, 1976 (age 50) Montreal, Quebec
- Party: Action démocratique du Québec

Éric Laporte (born January 24, 1976) is a Canadian politician. He was an Action démocratique du Québec Member of the National Assembly for the electoral district of L'Assomption from 2007 to 2008.

Laporte is a graduate from the Université du Québec à Montréal where he obtained a bachelor's degree in business administration and was also trained at Institut canadien des valeurs mobilieres. He worked as an agent at the National Bank in Montreal and Industrielle Alliance in Charlemagne. He was also a member of the Terrebonne Chamber of Commerce as well as the vice-president of the international student association in economic and commercial sciences at the UQAM.

He was first elected in the 2007 election with 39% of the vote. Parti Québécois incumbent Jean-Claude St-André finished second with 34% of the vote. Laporte took office on April 12, 2007.
