= Breaking Point (2005 film) =

2005 Canadian television film

- Written by: Hubert Gendron; Andrea Thiel; André Royer; Jacqueline Dubé-Corkery
- Directed by: Jackie Corkery
- Starring: Judith M. Atkinson; Lucien Bouchard; Henry Champ; Jean Chrétien; Jacques Parizeau; Brian Tobin; Daniel Johnson Jr.; Jean Charest; Frank McKenna
- Country of origin: Canada
- Original language: English

Production
- Producers: Susan Dando; Hubert Gendron; Mark Starowicz
- Running time: 200 minutes
- Production company: CBC Television

Original release
- Release: October 30, 2005

Breaking Point (French: Point de rupture) is a Canadian documentary film, released in 2005. Aired on CBC Television in English and on Radio-Canada in French and released to mark the tenth anniversary of the 1995 Quebec sovereignty referendum, the film explored the dynamics of the referendum campaign through interviews with and news clips of several of the major players on both sides of the debate.

The two-part film aired on SRC in September 2005, and on CBC in October. It has also been released on DVD.

== Synopsis ==
The two-part documentary focuses on the battle between the Federalist camp led by Jean Chrétien representing the "No-side" vote regarding Quebec Sovereignty as they go against the "Yes-side", led by Lucien Bouchard and Jacques Parizeau promoting a sovereignty society separate from Canada.

== Film Content ==
Part-one of the CBC Documentary Breaking Point goes behind the scenes of the 1995 Quebec Referendum. The documentary outlines the Quebec sovereigntist campaign after they were defeated by the Federalist in the 1980 referendum. Part-one highlights the successes and struggles of the Quebec Sovereignty movement as Jacques Parizeau, former Premier of Quebec who led the 1980 Quebec Referendum, had been forced to hand the initially struggling 'Yes camp' to the more-popular Lucien Bouchard, leader of the Bloc Quebecois. In this, the documentary shows the struggles of Quebec trying to obtain outside support from other countries such as; United States and France. Support inside their province becomes a challenge as groups such as; James Bay Cree and French-Canadians are skeptic regarding what the future would look like in the absence of Canada.

Part-two focuses on the head-to-head battle between Jean Chretien and Lucien Bouchard as both leaders campaign to their supporter's weeks before the 1995 referendum vote. In Part two, the United States showed their support for Chretien's Federalist campaign and the James Bay Cree hold a referendum deciding whether they want to separate from Canada alongside Quebec. Ultimately, Jean Chretien and Lucien Bouchard are left to give their final speeches before fate is determined on October 30, 1995, as the population of Quebec vote to decide whether they should separate, or remain a part of Canada.

=== The "No-side" ===
Known as the Federalist camp voting "No" to Quebec Sovereignty in the 1995 referendum led by Jean Chretien and the Quebec Liberal Party.

=== The "Yes-side" ===
Consisted of the individuals of the Quebec population in favor of separating from Canada. This campaign was led by Jacques Parizeau and Lucien Bouchard promoting the "Yes-side" campaign.

== James Bay Cree Referendum ==
The James Bay Cree held a referendum to decide if their territory should remain a part of Canada should Québec vote to separate in its own forthcoming referendum. This three-day referendum was a result of the First Nations of James Bay Cree "who are requesting the same recognition" like Quebec for a distinct society during the Quebec referendum years. They do this because they are worried about what the future holds if Quebec separates from Canada. CBC Documentary Breaking Point highlights that the "Cree is determined to have their own referendum and they intend to be the masters of their own future". The referendum is based on one question, "Do you consent the government of Quebec separates the James Bay Cree and create traditional territory from Canada in the event of a yes vote in the Quebec referendum?" This situation put Canada in a difficult position because they now have to vote on Quebec and James Bay Cree. Once the votes were polled, 77% of the eligible members of the Cree ended up voting and the majority vote was to stay with Canada.

== 1995 Quebec Referendum ==
Following the 1980 Quebec Referendum, the 1995 Quebec referendum was the second time that Canadian citizen residents of Quebec would vote whether the province of Quebec would declare national sovereignty and become an independent country or continue to be a cooperative partner as a province within Canadian borders.
