= Jean-Claude St-André =

Canadian politician (born 1962)

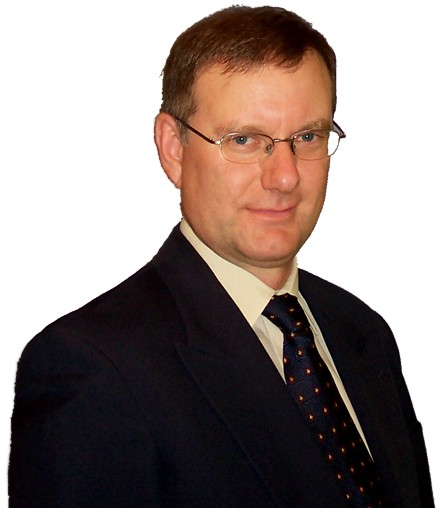
- Jean-Claude St-André

MNA for L'Assomption
- In office June 10, 1996 – March 26, 2007
- Preceded by: Jacques Parizeau
- Succeeded by: Éric Laporte

Personal details
- Born: September 27, 1962 (age 63) Montreal, Quebec
- Party: Parti Québécois

Jean-Claude St-André (born September 27, 1962) is a Quebec provincial politician and was the Member of the National Assembly of Quebec representing L'Assomption for the Parti Québécois.

He earned his Bachelor of Arts in social sciences from the Université de Montréal in 1984 and subsequently studied business administration at the Université du Québec à Montréal. After working for several years in business he became involved in politics joining the staff of the MNA for Anjou in 1992 and then serving in the office of the Premier of Quebec, Jacques Parizeau from 1994 to 1996. As a youth he had campaigned for the "Yes" side in the 1980 Quebec referendum on sovereignty-association and was also active with the PQ on the Anjou riding executive and as a campaign manager throughout the 1980s and 1990s.

On June 10, 1996, he was elected MNA for L'Assomption in a by-election and was re-elected in the 1998 and 2003 provincial elections.

Since May 2003 he has been spokesman of the official opposition on birthrate and demography.

On August 25, 2005, St-André officially became a candidate in the 2005 Parti Québécois leadership election. He won 951 votes or 0.9% of ballots cast when the vote results were announced on November 15, 2005.

In the 2007 Quebec elections, St-André was defeated by the ADQ's Eric Laporte by over 2,000 votes.

On November 8, 2008, members of the Parti Québécois put his name forward for the MNA for L'Assomption riding in the 2008 provincial election; however, Parti Québécois leader Pauline Marois ruled his candidacy out, on the basis that the riding owes the party money, and St-André would not rally to the party line of placing a separatist referendum on the back burner.
