= Étienne Mathieu =

Canadian politician

Member of the Legislative Assembly of Quebec for L'Assomption
- In office 1867–1871
- Succeeded by: Onuphe Peltier

Personal details
- Born: November 21, 1804 Lachenaie, Lower Canada
- Died: January 16, 1872 (aged 67) Lachenaie, Quebec
- Party: Conservative

Étienne Mathieu (November 21, 1804 – January 16, 1872) was a farmer, land owner and political figure in Quebec. He represented L'Assomption in the Legislative Assembly of Quebec from 1867 to 1871 as a Conservative.

He was born in Lachenaie, Lower Canada, the son of Jean-Marie Mathieu and Josephte Quenneville. Mathieu was educated at the Collège Masson à Terrebonne. In 1830, he married Josephte Duprat. He was a major in the militia, a justice of the peace and president of the agricultural society at Lachenaie. He was also a school commissioner and was mayor of Lachenaie from 1867 to 1869. Mathieu died in Lachenaie at the age of 67.
