= Maxime Laporte =

Maxime Laporte MNA

Member of the National Assembly for L'Assomption
- Incumbent
- Assumed office October 5, 2026
- Preceded by: François Legault

Personal details
- Party: Parti Québécois

Maxime Laporte is a Canadian politician who is a candidate for the National Assembly of Quebec for L'Assomption in the 2026 Quebec general election as a member of the Parti Québécois.

A constitutional lawyer, Laporte was previously the president of the Saint-Jean-Baptiste Society and the Mouvement Québec français.
