= Scott McKay (politician) =

Canadian politician

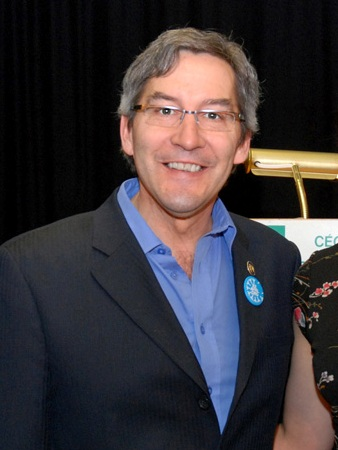

Member of the National Assembly of Quebec for Repentigny
- In office September 4, 2012 – April 7, 2014
- Preceded by: Riding Established
- Succeeded by: Lise Lavallée

Member of the National Assembly of Quebec for L'Assomption
- In office December 8, 2008 – September 4, 2012
- Preceded by: Éric Laporte
- Succeeded by: François Legault

Leader of the Green Party of Quebec
- In office 2006–2008
- Preceded by: Richard Savignac
- Succeeded by: Guy Rainville

Personal details
- Born: December 2, 1960 (age 65) Montréal-Est, Quebec, Canada
- Party: Green → Parti Québécois

Scott McKay (born December 2, 1960) is a Canadian politician, who served as a former leader of the Green Party of Quebec and a former Montreal council member. McKay was elected in 2008 to the Quebec National Assembly for the Parti Québécois but he was defeated in the 2014 Quebec election.

== Background ==
McKay was born to a francophone mother and an Irish-anglophone father in the town of Montréal-Est. He has completed a MSc in Environmental sciences at the Université du Québec à Montréal and is currently working in the field of water treatment. He also obtained a bachelor's degree in sciences at the UQAM in 1987.

== Municipal politics ==
In 1986, he was elected to Montreal's City Council as candidate of Jean Doré's Rassemblement des citoyens et citoyennes de Montréal (RCM) for the district of Honoré-Beaugrand. He was re-elected in 1990, but lost to Ivon Le Duc in 1994 as Pierre Bourque became mayor.

== Provincial politics ==
McKay became leader of the Green Party of Quebec on May 28, 2006. The party ran candidates in 108 out of Quebec's 125 districts in 2007. None of them was elected. McKay himself finished fourth in the district of Bourget with 2,632 ballots and about 8.09% of the vote. The winner was Diane Lemieux of the Parti Québécois.

McKay lost the party leadership at a convention held in Trois-Rivières on March 29, 2008. Guy Rainville had won a mail-in vote with 268 ballots (54%) against McKay's 225. Nonetheless, McKay was the Green candidate in the by-election that was called as a result of Lemieux's resignation in the district of Bourget.

=== Switch to the Parti Québécois ===
McKay switched parties to run for the Parti Québécois in the 2008 Quebec election, in the riding of L'Assomption.

On December 8, 2008, he was elected as an MNA for the PQ in the riding of L'Assomption. Due to riding redistribution, McKay ran in the new riding of Repentigny in the 2012 Quebec election and won. Eighteen months later, McKay was defeated by Coalition Avenir Québec candidate Lise Lavallée in the 2014 Quebec election.

== See also ==
- List of Green party leaders in Canada

== Electoral record (partial) ==
Quebec provincial by-election, May 12, 2008: Bourget
Party	Candidate	Votes	%	±%
Parti Québécois	Maka Kotto	6,575	40.66	−0.60
Liberal	Lyn Thériault	5,161	31.92	+9.07
Green	Scott McKay	1,839	11.37	+3.28
Action démocratique	Denis Mondor	1,520	9.40	−13.61
Québec solidaire	Gaétan Legault	700	4.33	+0.14
Parti indépendantiste	Richard Gervais	376	2.33	–
Total valid votes		16,171	99.01	–
Total rejected ballots		162	0.99	–
Turnout		16,333	34.55	−35.34
Electors on the lists		47,276	–	–
Source: Official Results, Le Directeur général des élections du Québec.

Political offices
Preceded by Jacques Martineau	City Councillor, District of Honoré-Beaugrand; 1986-1994	Succeeded by Ivon Le Duc (Vision Montreal)
Party political offices
Preceded by Richard Savignac	Leaders of the Green Party of Quebec; 2006-2008	Succeeded by Guy Rainville
