= L'Épiphanie =

- City
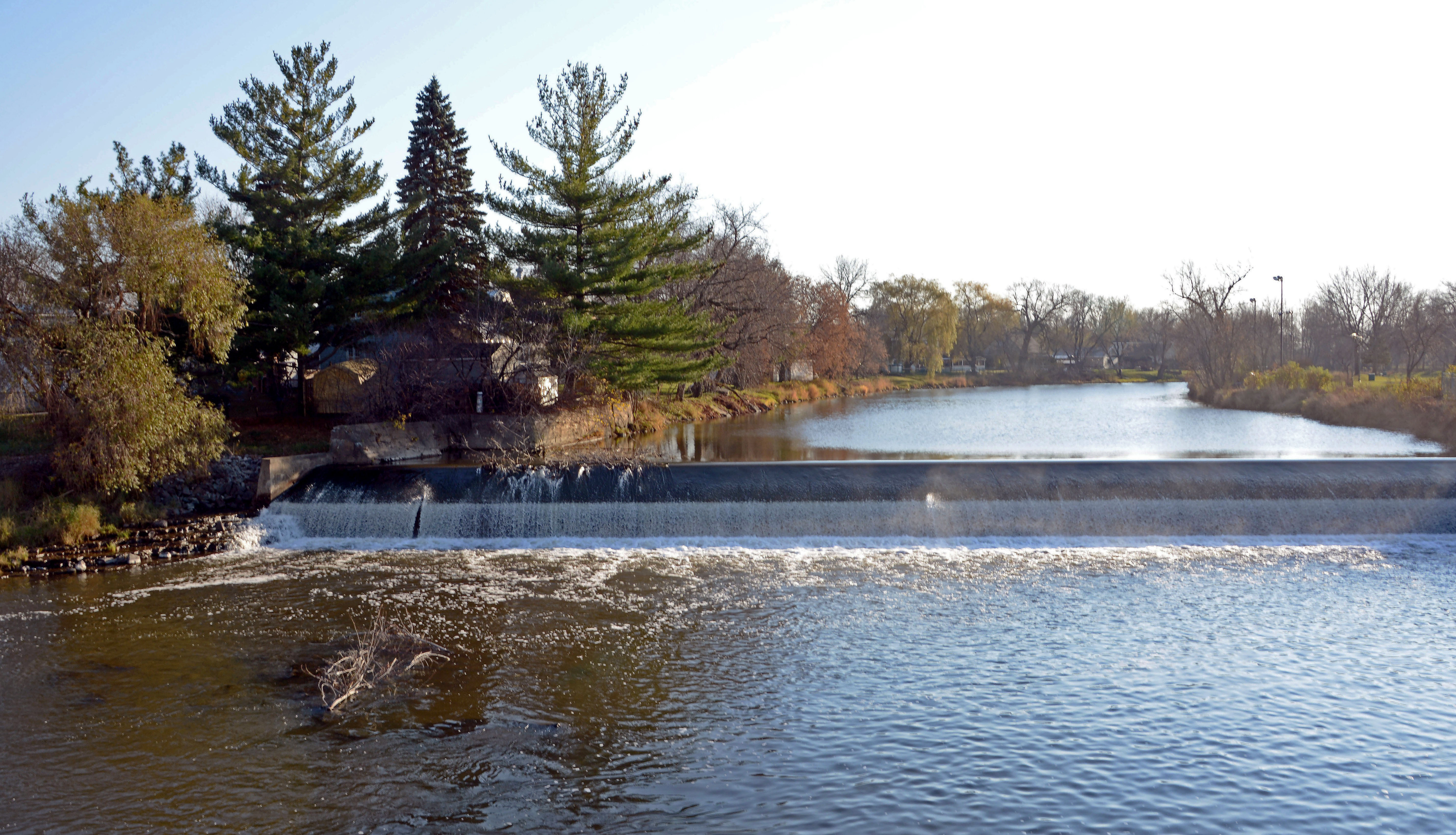
- L'Achigan River

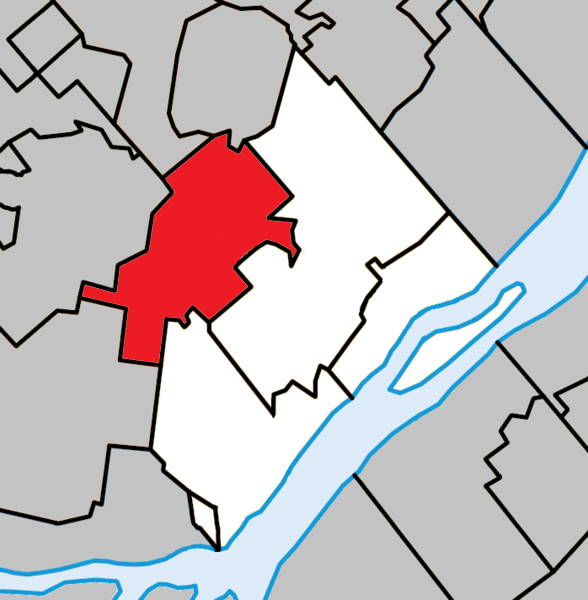
- Location within L'Assomption RCM

- Location in central Quebec
- Coordinates: 45°51′N 73°29′W
- Country: Canada
- Province: Quebec
- Region: Lanaudière
- RCM: L'Assomption
- Constituted: May 23, 2018

Government
  - Mayor: Steve Plante
  - Fed. riding: Montcalm
  - Prov. riding: L'Assomption

Area
  - City: 58.17 km^{2} (22.46 sq mi)
  - Land: 56.57 km^{2} (21.84 sq mi)
  - Urban: 10.10 km^{2} (3.90 sq mi)

Population (2021)
  - City: 8,883
  - Density: 157/km^{2} (410/sq mi)
  - Urban: 7,607
  - Urban density: 753/km^{2} (1,950/sq mi)
  - Change 2016–21: ▲2.2%
  - Dwellings: 3,695
- Time zone: UTC−05:00 (EST)
  - Summer (DST): UTC−04:00 (EDT)
- Postal code(s): J5X
- Area codes: 450 and 579
- Highways: R-339 R-341
- Website: www.lepiphanie.ca

L'Épiphanie (French pronunciation: [lepifani]) is a town in Lanaudière, Quebec, Canada, located on the bank of the L'Achigan river. It has nearly 9,000 inhabitants and was 150 years old in 2004.

On May 23, 2018, the town was greatly enlarged when the Parish Municipality of L'Épiphanie was added to it.

Since 1732, the place was known as L'Achigan, thus taking the name of the river flowing through its territory. It was not until 1853 that the name L'Épiphanie appeared. This coincided with the moment of the canonical establishment of the parish, which had just separated from L'Assomption. Historians generally agree to see in this name the transposition of a Sulpician custom. They were owners of the Saint-Sulpice seigneury within which a large part of the territory of L'Épiphanie was included. On January 6 of each year, the day of the Epiphany, the Sulpicians came to celebrate a mass and took advantage of it to collect the seigniorial rents which were due to them. Ignace Bourget, Bishop of Montreal from 1840 to 1876, would have liked to recall this custom by retaining the name L'Épiphanie.

== Geography ==
=== Climate ===
Based on the Vercheres station

Climate data for L'Épiphanie, Quebec
Month	Jan	Feb	Mar	Apr	May	Jun	Jul	Aug	Sep	Oct	Nov	Dec	Year
Record high °C (°F)	13 (55)	12 (54)	21 (70)	30 (86)	34 (93)	35 (95)	35.5 (95.9)	35.6 (96.1)	33 (91)	28.9 (84.0)	20 (68)	15 (59)	35.6 (96.1)
Mean daily maximum °C (°F)	−5.7 (21.7)	−3.4 (25.9)	2.2 (36.0)	11.3 (52.3)	19 (66)	24.1 (75.4)	26.5 (79.7)	25.5 (77.9)	20.6 (69.1)	12.9 (55.2)	5.6 (42.1)	−1.8 (28.8)	11.4 (52.5)
Daily mean °C (°F)	−10 (14)	−7.9 (17.8)	−2.2 (28.0)	6.3 (43.3)	13.4 (56.1)	18.6 (65.5)	21.1 (70.0)	20.1 (68.2)	15.4 (59.7)	8.5 (47.3)	2 (36)	−5.6 (21.9)	6.6 (43.9)
Mean daily minimum °C (°F)	−14.3 (6.3)	−12.4 (9.7)	−6.7 (19.9)	1.2 (34.2)	7.7 (45.9)	13.1 (55.6)	15.7 (60.3)	14.5 (58.1)	10.2 (50.4)	4.1 (39.4)	−1.5 (29.3)	−9.3 (15.3)	1.9 (35.4)
Record low °C (°F)	−34.5 (−30.1)	−37.2 (−35.0)	−31 (−24)	−15 (5)	−6.7 (19.9)	0 (32)	5.5 (41.9)	2.8 (37.0)	−6 (21)	−7.8 (18.0)	−21 (−6)	−32 (−26)	−37.2 (−35.0)
Average precipitation mm (inches)	73.6 (2.90)	56.4 (2.22)	59.2 (2.33)	72.6 (2.86)	84.5 (3.33)	98.6 (3.88)	93.2 (3.67)	93.6 (3.69)	87.4 (3.44)	93 (3.7)	89.9 (3.54)	81.6 (3.21)	983.6 (38.72)
Average rainfall mm (inches)	26.2 (1.03)	18.5 (0.73)	27 (1.1)	66.5 (2.62)	84.5 (3.33)	98.6 (3.88)	93.2 (3.67)	93.6 (3.69)	87.4 (3.44)	92.6 (3.65)	77.4 (3.05)	32.2 (1.27)	797.6 (31.40)
Average snowfall cm (inches)	47.5 (18.7)	37.8 (14.9)	32.2 (12.7)	6.3 (2.5)	0 (0)	0 (0)	0 (0)	0 (0)	0 (0)	0.5 (0.2)	12.5 (4.9)	49.4 (19.4)	182.2 (71.7)
Source: Environment Canada

== Demographics ==
In the 2021 Census of Population conducted by Statistics Canada, L'Épiphanie had a population of 8,883 living in 3,583 of its 3,695 total private dwellings, a change of 2.2% from its 2016 population of 8,693. With a land area of 56.57 km^{2} (21.84 sq mi), it had a population density of 157.0/km^{2} (406.7/sq mi) in 2021.

Canada census – L'Épiphanie community profile

	2021	2016	2011
Population	8,883 (+2.2% from 2016)	5,495 (-2.6% from 2011)	5,353 (+16.2% from 2006)
Land area	56.57 km^{2} (21.84 sq mi)	2.30 km^{2} (0.89 sq mi)	2.26 km^{2} (0.87 sq mi)
Population density	157/km^{2} (410/sq mi)	2,387.4/km^{2} (6,183/sq mi)	2,367.9/km^{2} (6,133/sq mi)
Median age	38.8 (M: 38.4, F: 38.8)	36.5 (M: 35.4.7, F: 37.6)	36.8 (M: 36.3, F: 37.2)
Private dwellings	3,695 (total) 3,583 (occupied)	2,240 (total)	2,110 (total)
Median household income	$79,000	$32,704	$32,704

References: 2021 2016 2011

Historical census populations – L'Épiphanie

Year	Pop.	±%
1921	1,199	—
1931	1,705	+42.2%
1941	1,941	+13.8%
1951	2,462	+26.8%
1956	2,671	+8.5%
1961	2,663	−0.3%

Year	Pop.	±%
1966	2,664	+0.0%
1971	2,752	+3.3%
1976	2,912	+5.8%
1981	2,971	+2.0%
1986	2,846	−4.2%
1991	3,469	+21.9%

Year	Pop.	±%
1996	4,153	+19.7%
2001	4,208	+1.3%
2006	4,606	+9.5%
2011	5,353	+16.2%
2016	5,493	+2.6%
2021	8,883	+61.7%

Population counts are not adjusted for boundary changes or merger.
Source: Statistics Canada

Mother tongue (2021):

- English as first language: 0.8%
- French as first language: 96.1%
- English and French as first languages: 0.7%
- Other as first language: 1.7%

== Economy ==
=== Agriculture ===
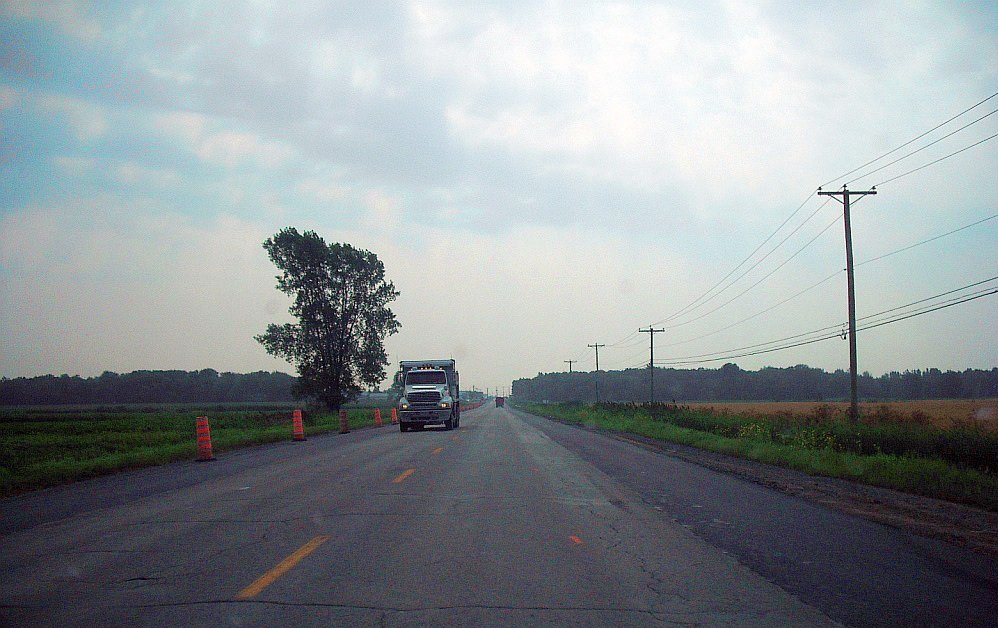
Route 341

L'Épiphanie was once a thriving industrial city. The first important industry was that of the Lynch family with the manufacture of furniture. But it was the cigar industry with the Bourdon family that long characterized the economy of L'Épiphanie. This industry led to the development of another company: the "Cigar Box" factory. This became thirty years later "Canada Manufacturing", specializing in the manufacture of boxes of all kinds. "Source Colombia", meanwhile, began its activities between 1880 and 1912. For many years, it provided mineral water equal in quality to imported water. But most of these companies, for various reasons, ceased their activities in the sixties. Today, agriculture is the main economic sector of the city.

== Sports ==
L'Épiphanie is home to the Chasse Gallerie boating circuit and the Chez Ti-Jean cross country skiing centre.

== Infrastructure ==
=== Cemeteries ===
Cemeteries in or near L'Épiphanie include the L'Épiphanie Cemetery, the Grand Cemetery of L'Assomption, and the Saint-Gérard-Majella Cemetery.

== See also ==
- List of cities in Quebec
