= Pascale Déry =

Canadian politician

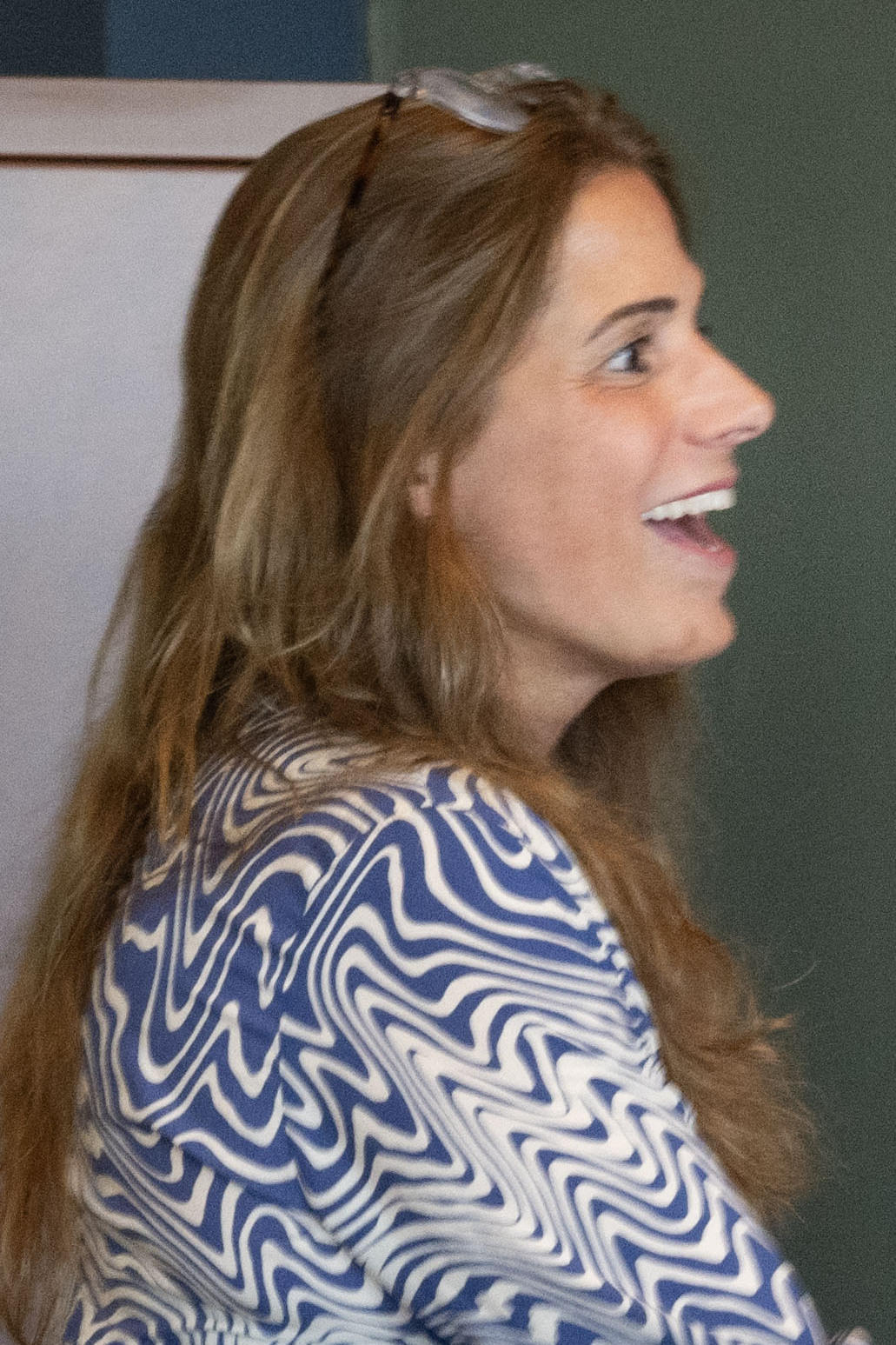
- Déry in 2024

Quebec Minister of the Environment, the Fight Against Climate Change, Wildlife and Parks
- In office April 21, 2026 – October 21, 2026
- Premier: Christine Fréchette
- Preceded by: Benoit Charette
- Succeeded by: Jean Pellerin

Quebec Minister of Employment
- In office September 10, 2025 – April 21, 2026
- Premier: François Legault
- Preceded by: Kateri Champagne Jourdain
- Succeeded by: Jean-François Simard

Quebec Minister of Higher Education
- In office October 20, 2022 – September 10, 2025
- Premier: François Legault
- Preceded by: Danielle McCann
- Succeeded by: Martine Biron

Member of the National Assembly of Quebec for Repentigny
- In office October 3, 2022 – October 5, 2026
- Preceded by: Lise Lavallée
- Succeeded by: Nicolas Girard

Personal details
- Born: 1976 (age 49–50) Montreal, Quebec, Canada
- Party: Coalition Avenir Québec (provincial); Conservative (federal)

Pascale Déry (born 1976) is a Canadian politician. She sought the Conservative Party of Canada nomination for Mount Royal in the 2015 Canadian federal election, losing to Robert Libman. She was instead nominated in Drummond for that election, where she finished in fourth position after the New Democratic, Liberal, and Bloc Québécois candidates. In the 2022 Quebec general election, she was elected to represent the riding of Repentigny as a member of the Coalition Avenir Québec. She was named Quebec's Minister of Higher Education on October 20, 2022, and, following a cabinet reshuffle, Minister of Employment on September 10, 2025. Premier Christine Fréchette appointed her as Minister of the Environment, the Fight Against Climate Change, Wildlife and Parks in 2026.

Déry is Jewish and speaks fluent French, English and Spanish. She was formerly a television journalist for TVA and Le Canal Nouvelles.

== Electoral record ==
2026 Quebec general election: Repentigny
** Preliminary results — Not yet official **
Party	Candidate	Votes	%	±%
Parti Québécois	Nicolas Girard	14,604	36.21	
Coalition Avenir Québec	Pascale Déry	8,754	21.70	
Liberal	Yvena Luc	7,554	18.73	
Conservative	Vincent Côté	5,158	12.79	
Québec solidaire	Martin Lefebvre	3,931	9.75	
Green	Shawn-Brandon Rimpel	332	0.82	
Total valid votes				
Total rejected ballots				
Turnout			72.11	
Electors on the lists			–	–
Parti Québécois gain from Coalition Avenir Québec		Swing		+
Source: Élections Québec

2022 Quebec general election: Repentigny
Party	Candidate	Votes	%	±%
Coalition Avenir Québec	Pascale Déry	19,747	52.36	+2.62
Parti Québécois	Aïcha Van Dun	6,686	17.73	-1.06
Québec solidaire	Ednal Marc	4,783	12.68	-2.19
Liberal	Virginie Bouchard	3,758	9.96	-3.70
Conservative	Serge Cloutier	2,419	6.41	+5.60
Climat Québec	David Brisebois	321	0.85	–
Total valid votes		37,714	98.71	–
Total rejected ballots		492	1.29	-0.26
Turnout		37,714	73.24	-0.97
Electors on the lists		52,169	–	–
Coalition Avenir Québec hold		Swing		+1.84
