= Asbestos Corporation =

Canadian mining company

Asbestos Corporation Limited
- Type: Public
- Traded as: NEX: AB.H
- Industry: Asbestos mining
- Founded: 6 October 1925
- Headquarters: Montreal, Canada
- Key people: John LeBoutillier (President & C.E.O)
- Number of employees: 2,000

Asbestos Corporation Limited (ACL) is a Canadian corporation originally established to mine asbestos. ACL mainly open pit mined chrysotile asbestos in Thetford Mines, Quebec. It is no longer involved in asbestos mining, but as a subsidiary of Mazarin Inc it continues to exist to exploit the minerals contained in its tailings in Thetford Mines as well as restoring and developing its land holdings. The company faces multiple ongoing lawsuits regarding its former asbestos operations.
