= Saint-Sulpice, Quebec =

Saint-Sulpice
- Parish municipality
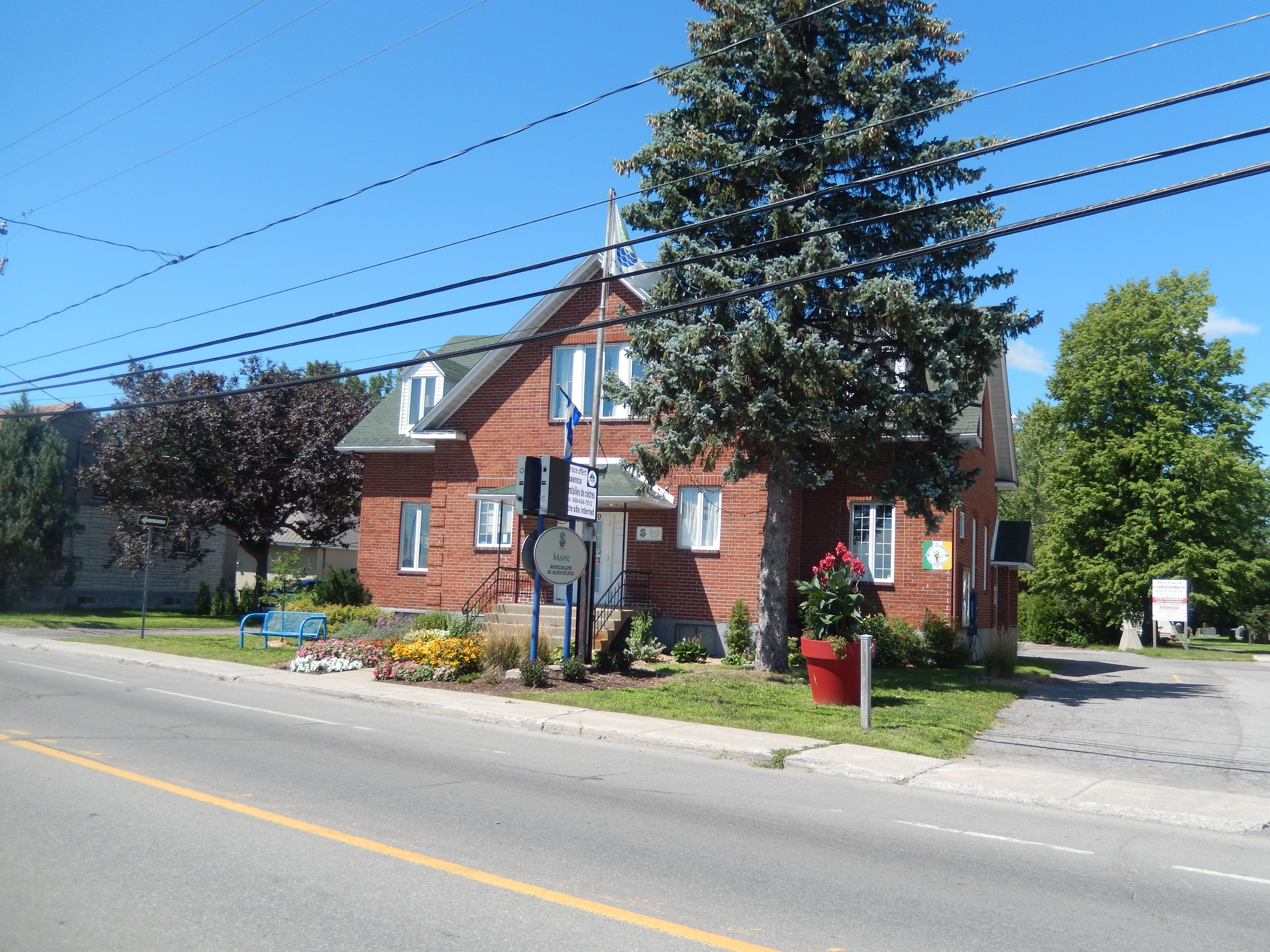

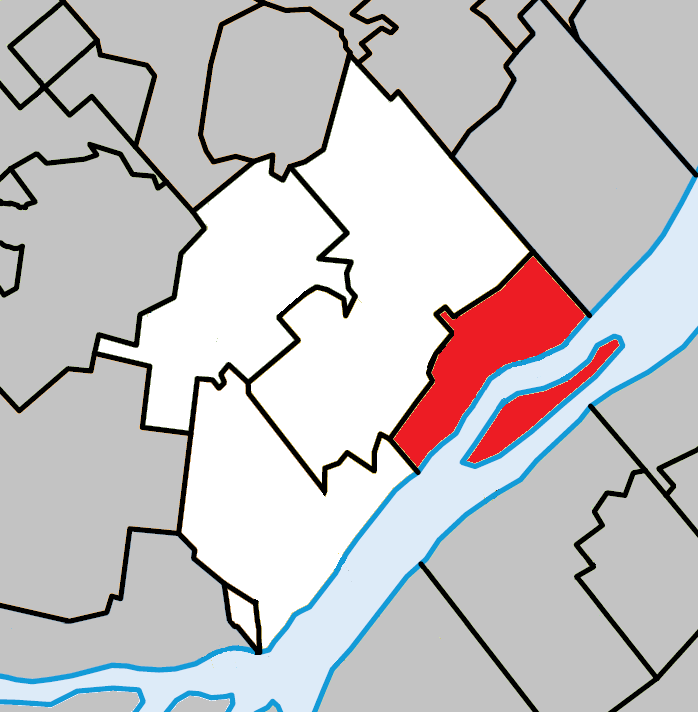
- Location within L'Assomption RCM

- Location in central Quebec
- Coordinates: 45°50′N 73°21′W
- Country: Canada
- Province: Quebec
- Region: Lanaudière
- RCM: L'Assomption
- Settled: 1680
- Constituted: July 1, 1855

Government
  - Mayor: Steve Mador
  - Fed. riding: Repentigny
  - Prov. riding: L'Assomption

Area
  - Total: 52.73 km^{2} (20.36 sq mi)
  - Land: 36.17 km^{2} (13.97 sq mi)
  - Urban: 1.17 km^{2} (0.45 sq mi)

Population (2021)
  - Total: 3,360
  - Density: 92.9/km^{2} (241/sq mi)
  - Urban: 1,769
  - Urban density: 1,515.3/km^{2} (3,925/sq mi)
  - Pop (2016–21): ▼2.3%
  - Dwellings: 1,517
- Time zone: UTC−5 (EST)
  - Summer (DST): UTC−4 (EDT)
- Postal code(s): J5W 1G1
- Area codes: 450, 579
- Highways A-40: R-138 R-343
- Website: www.municipalitesaintsulpice.com

Saint-Sulpice (French pronunciation: [sɛ̃ sylpis]) is a municipality in the Lanaudière region of Quebec, Canada, part of the L'Assomption Regional County Municipality. It is located on the north shore of the Saint Lawrence River and includes most of Verchères Islands.

== History ==
From 1680 onwards, French settlers colonized this area, clearing the land for cultivation. At that time it was part of the Saint-Sulpice Seignory that was owned by the Society of Saint-Sulpice. In 1640 the seignory granted a concession to Pierre Chevrier, Baron of Fancamp, and to Jérôme Le Royer.

In 1706, the settlement was assigned its first pastor and in 1715, it had the region's only flour mill in operation. The Parish of Saint-Sulpice was formed in 1722, taking its name from the seignory. In 1845, the parish municipality was formed and in 1854, its post office opened.

== Demographics ==
In the 2021 Census of Population conducted by Statistics Canada, Saint-Sulpice had a population of 3,360 living in 1,466 of its 1,517 total private dwellings, a change of −2.3% from its 2016 population of 3,439. With a land area of 36.17 km^{2} (13.97 sq mi), it had a population density of 92.9/km^{2} (240.6/sq mi) in 2021.

Canada census – Saint-Sulpice community profile

	2021	2016	2011
Population	3,360 (-2.3% from 2016)	3,439 (+5.1% from 2011)	3,273 (-1.8% from 2006)
Land area	36.17 km^{2} (13.97 sq mi)	36.36 km^{2} (14.04 sq mi)	36.38 km^{2} (14.05 sq mi)
Population density	92.9/km^{2} (241/sq mi)	94.6/km^{2} (245/sq mi)	90.0/km^{2} (233/sq mi)
Median age	44.4 (M: 44.0, F: 44.8)	43.2 (M: 42.7, F: 43.8)	41.3 (M: 40.9, F: 41.7)
Private dwellings	1,517 (total) 1,466 (occupied)	1,494 (total)	1,375 (total)
Median household income	$83,000	$72,414	$69,989

References: 2021 2016 2011

Historical Census Data - Saint-Sulpice, Quebec

Year	Pop.	±%
1861	1,015	—
1871	864	−14.9%
1881	768	−11.1%
1891	622	−19.0%
1901	665	+6.9%
1911	674	+1.4%
1921	610	−9.5%
1931	624	+2.3%

Year	Pop.	±%
1941	702	+12.5%
1951	903	+28.6%
1956	1,082	+19.8%
1961	1,285	+18.8%
1966	1,418	+10.4%
1971	1,529	+7.8%
1976	1,568	+2.6%
1981	1,812	+15.6%

Year	Pop.	±%
1986	1,969	+8.7%
1991	2,549	+29.5%
1996	3,307	+29.7%
2001	3,343	+1.1%
2006	3,332	−0.3%
2011	3,273	−1.8%
2016	3,439	+5.1%
2021	3,360	−2.3%

Source: Statistics Canada

Canada Census Mother Tongue - Saint-Sulpice, Quebec
Census	Total	French			English			French & English			Other		
Year	Responses	Count	Trend	Pop %	Count	Trend	Pop %	Count	Trend	Pop %	Count	Trend	Pop %
2021	3,345	3,200	▼3.2%	95.7%	30	0.0%	0.9%	30	▲100.0%	0.9%	80	▲6.7%	2.4%
2016	3,420	3,305	▲5.3%	96.6%	30	▼14.3%	0.9%	15	0.0%	0.4%	75	▲15.4%	2.2%
2011	3,255	3,140	▼2.6%	96.5%	35	▲133.3%	1.1%	15	▼40.0%	0.5%	65	▲30.0%	2.0%
2006	3,315	3,225	▼1.4%	97.3%	15	▲50.0%	0.5%	25	▼ n/a%	0.8%	50	▼9.1%	1.5%
2001	3,335	3,270	▲2.0%	98.1%	10	▼71.4%	0.3%	0	▼100.0%	0.0%	55	▲120.0%	1.7%
1996	3,280	3,205	n/a	97.7%	35	n/a	1.1%	15	n/a	0.5%	25	n/a	0.8%

== Government ==
List of former mayors:

- Michel Champagne (...–2009)
- Jean Gendron (2009–2012)
- Michel Champagne (2012–2021)
- Steve Mador (2021–present)

== Education ==
The Sir Wilfrid Laurier School Board operates anglophone public schools, including:

- Joliette Elementary School in Saint-Charles-Borromée

== Sister cities ==
- Saint-Jean-d'Angély (France)

== Notable people ==
- Jacques Rougeau - former professional Wrestler, also known as "The Mountie"

== See also ==
- List of parish municipalities in Quebec
