= Quebec Stock Savings Plan =

The Quebec Stock Savings Plan (French: Régime d'épargne-actions, RÉA) was a program founded on March 27, 1979 by then-Minister of Finance Jacques Parizeau, that offered taxpayers generous tax write-offs for investments in new public stock issues of companies whose head office was in Quebec, and was governed by the Quebec Taxation Act. Tax expenditures under the QSSP amounted to nearly $1 billion from its beginning to its end. It was replaced by the SME Growth Stock Plan, now known as the Stock Savings Plan II, on April 22, 2005.

== Goals ==
- to alleviate the heavy tax load of Quebec's middle and high-income earners
- to finance Quebec companies with risk capital
- to acquaint Quebec's population at large with the stock market
