= L'Assomption Regional County Municipality =

L'Assomption
- Regional county municipality
- Coordinates: 45°48′N 73°26′W
- Country: Canada
- Province: Quebec
- Region: Lanaudière
- Effective: January 1, 1983
- County seat: L'Assomption

Government
  - Type: Prefecture
  - Prefect: Chantal Deschamps

Area
  - Total: 285.40 km^{2} (110.19 sq mi)
  - Land: 255.65 km^{2} (98.71 sq mi)

Population (2016)
  - Total: 124,759
  - Density: 488/km^{2} (1,260/sq mi)
  - Change 2011–2016: ▲4.1%
  - Dwellings: 50,828
- Time zone: UTC−5 (EST)
  - Summer (DST): UTC−4 (EDT)
- Area codes: 450 and 579
- Website: www.mrclassomption.qc.ca

L'Assomption (French pronunciation: [lasɔ̃psjɔ̃]) is a regional county municipality in the Lanaudière region of Quebec, Canada. The seat is L'Assomption. L'Assomption is located directly north of the city of Montreal.

It is named for the L'Assomption River, which flows through the region from the north before emptying into the Saint Lawrence River in the south of the region at Repentigny.

== Subdivisions ==
There are 5 subdivisions within the RCM:

Cities & Towns (4)

- Charlemagne
- L'Assomption
- L'Épiphanie
- Repentigny

Parishes (1)

- Saint-Sulpice

== Demographics ==
=== Population ===
Canada census – L'Assomption community profile

	2021	2016	2011
Population	128,087 (+2.7% from 2016)	124,759 (+4.1% from 2011)	119,840 (+9.3% from 2006)
Land area	255.16 km^{2} (98.52 sq mi)	255.65 km^{2} (98.71 sq mi)	255.71 km^{2} (98.73 sq mi)
Population density	502/km^{2} (1,300/sq mi)	488.0/km^{2} (1,264/sq mi)	468.7/km^{2} (1,214/sq mi)
Median age	43.2 (M: 42.0, F: 44.0)	42.5 (M: 41.3, F: 43.7)	41.7 (M: 40.6, F: 42.6)
Private dwellings	52,508 (total) 51,578 (occupied)	50,828 (total)	49,153 (total)
Median household income	$87,000	$74,714	$64,821

References: 2021 2016 2011

Historical Census Data - L'Assomption Regional County Municipality, Quebec

Year	Pop.	±%
1991	91,537	—
1996	102,188	+11.6%
2001	103,977	+1.8%

Year	Pop.	±%
2006	109,636	+5.4%
2011	119,840	+9.3%
2016	124,759	+4.1%

=== Language ===
Canada Census Mother Tongue - L'Assomption Regional County Municipality, Quebec
Census	Total	French			English			French & English			Other		
Year	Responses	Count	Trend	Pop %	Count	Trend	Pop %	Count	Trend	Pop %	Count	Trend	Pop %
2021	127,440	112,740	▼6.54%	88.46%	1,855	▲5.4%	1.45%	1,090	▲83.2%	0.86%	9,765	▲22.22%	7.67%
2016	123,830	113,485	▲2.0%	91.6%	1,760	▲8.0%	1.4%	595	▼9.8%	0.56%	7,990	▲67.5%	6.5%
2011	118,285	111,225	▲7.3%	94.03%	1,630	▲21.6%	1.38%	660	▲97.0%	0.56%	4,770	▲38.7%	4.03%
2006	108,815	103,700	▲3.3%	95.30%	1,340	▲21.3%	1.23%	335	▲42.6%	0.31%	3,440	▲135.6%	3.16%
2001	103,200	100,400	▲2.4%	97.29%	1,105	▼22.7%	1.07%	235	▼30.9%	0.23%	1,460	▲9.8%	1.41%
1996	101,190	98,090	n/a	96.94%	1,430	n/a	1.41%	340	n/a	0.34%	1,330	n/a	1.31%

== Transportation ==
=== Access Routes ===
Highways and numbered routes that run through the municipality, including external routes that start or finish at the county border:

- Autoroutes
  - A-40
  - A-640
- Principal Highways
  - R-138
- Secondary Highways
  - R-339
  - R-341
  - R-344
- External Routes
  - None

== See also ==
- List of regional county municipalities and equivalent territories in Quebec
