= Huguette Lachapelle =

Canadian politician (1942–2021)

Huguette Lachapelle (October 28, 1942 – December 15, 2021) was a Canadian politician. Lachapelle served in the National Assembly of Quebec from 1981 to 1985, representing the Montreal riding of Dorion as a member of the Parti Québécois (PQ).

== Early life and career ==
Lachapelle was born in Saint-Basile, Quebec. She was a graduate of the Elie Business College à Montréal and was a parliamentary aide for PQ cabinet minister Lise Payette from 1976 to 1981.

== Legislator ==
Lachapelle was elected to the Quebec legislature in the 1981 provincial election. She was subsequently elected to the PQ party executive in December 1981, appointed one of three deputy government whips in René Lévesque's government on September 22, 1982, and promoted to chief government whip on December 4, 1984. She served in the latter position until October 23, 1985.

Lévesque resigned as PQ leader and premier in 1985, and Lachapelle supported Pierre-Marc Johnson's successful bid to succeed him. When asked about rival candidate Pauline Marois's prospects of winning, Lachapelle responded that she did not believe Quebecers were ready for a woman to be premier. Johnson distanced himself from this statement, and some political observers believed that it helped to increase Marois's public profile.

Lachapelle was defeated in the 1985 provincial election, losing by a narrow margin to Liberal candidate Violette Trépanier.

== After politics ==
Lachapelle worked in Quebec's justice department from 1986 until her retirement in 2002. She died on December 15, 2021, at the age of 79.

== Electoral record ==
1985 Quebec general election: Dorion
Party	Candidate	Votes	%
Liberal	Violette Trépanier	12,724	51.71
Parti Québécois	Huguette Lachapelle	10,226	41.56
New Democratic	Paul Comtois	653	2.65
Progressive Conservative	Robert Zambito	290	1.18
Parti indépendantiste	Normand Lacasse	268	1.09
Humanist	Alain Despaties	155	0.63
Communist	Line Chabot	76	0.31
United Social Credit	Réal Bastien	66	0.27
Commonwealth of Canada	M. Luisa Grau	56	0.23
Christian Socialist	André St-Arnaud	55	0.22
N/A (Workers)	Mario Caluori	36	0.15
Total valid votes		24,605	
Rejected and declined votes		453	
Turnout		25,058	74.58
Electors on the lists		33,601	
Source: Official Results, Le Directeur général des élections du Québec.

1981 Quebec general election: Dorion
Party	Candidate	Votes	%
Parti Québécois	Huguette Lachapelle	14,551	51.54
Liberal	Henri-François Gautrin	12,657	44.83
Union Nationale	François Lefebvre	524	1.86
Workers Communist	Suzanne Barbeau Foisy	161	0.57
Workers	Gilles Frenière	114	0.40
Marxist–Leninist	Ginette Boutet	88	0.31
Independent	Raymond Beaudoin	74	0.26
United Social Credit	Fernand Bélisle	66	0.23
Total valid votes		28,235	100.00
Rejected and declined votes		666	
Turnout		28,901	82.58
Electors on the lists		34,997	
Source: Official Results, Le Directeur général des élections du Québec.
