= Robert Zambito =

Robert Liborio Zambito

Montreal City Councillor for Saint-Léonard-Est
- In office 2009–2013
- Preceded by: Yvette Bissonnet
- Succeeded by: Domenico Moschella

Saint-Leonard Borough Councillor for Saint-Léonard-Est Known as Grande-Prairie before 2005
- In office 2001–2009
- Preceded by: position created
- Succeeded by: Lili-Anne Tremblay

Saint-Leonard City Councillor, Ward Ten
- In office 1998–2001
- Preceded by: redistribution
- Succeeded by: position eliminated

Saint-Leonard City Councillor, Ward Twelve
- In office 1986–1998
- Preceded by: Maurice Benoît
- Succeeded by: redistribution

Personal details
- Party: Union Montreal (2001-2013); Independent (2013-)
- Other political affiliations: With Monti for Italy; Forza Italia; Parti Municipal; Ralliement de Saint-Léonard; Progressive Conservative Party of Quebec

Robert Liborio Zambito is a politician in Montreal, Quebec, Canada. He was a municipal councilor, most recently serving on Montreal city council representing Saint-Léonard-Est as a member of the Union Montreal party between 2009 and 2013.

== Early life and private career ==
Zambito was born in Italy. He was a land surveyor in the 1980s and was described as president of Ciment National Inc. and Entreprises de construction Stertalco Inc. in 1986. He later worked as a travel-agency operator and real-estate broker.

== Early political career ==
Zambito was a Progressive Conservative Party of Quebec candidate in the 1985 provincial election, running in the Montreal division of Dorion. He focused his campaign on subsidized housing, community services for the elderly, and improved services at the city's Jean Talon Hospital. The Progressive Conservatives did not have a strong provincial base in Quebec, and Zambito finished fourth against Liberal Violette Trépanier on election day.

Zambito was narrowly elected to the Saint-Leonard city council in the 1986 municipal election, winning as a Ralliement de Saint-Léonard (RdSL) candidate in the city's twelfth ward. The RdSL won a majority on council, and Zambito initially supported mayor Raymond Renaud. In May 1988, Zambito and seven other councillors, led by Frank Zampino, charged that Renaud's administration was undemocratic and resigned from the party to sit as independents.

Frank Zampino later consolidated the rebel group as the Parti municipal and was elected as Saint-Leonard's mayor in the 1990 municipal election. Zambito was re-elected to council as a Parti municipal candidate in 1990, 1994 and 1998.

== Post-amalgamation ==
All municipalities on the Island of Montreal were amalgamated into a single government in 2001, and Saint-Leonard became part of the new city of Montreal. Zambito was elected to the Saint-Leonard borough council in the 2001 municipal election as a candidate of the Montreal Island Citizens Union, which was later renamed as Union Montreal. He was re-elected in 2005 and was elected to a seat on the Montreal city council in the 2009 municipal election.

In 2013 Zambito was up for re-election in St-Leonard and joined newly formed political party Equipe Coderre after his former party Union Montreal, under the former Mayor Gerald Tremblay, applied for dissolution after several raids were conducted by Montreal's anti-corruption squad (UPAC) and an investigation by the Charbonneau Commission.

Denis Coderre, mayoral candidate and party leader, removed Zambito from his party after Radio-Canada's investigative program Enquête, was planning to report that he had profited from a land deal by taking advantage of his position on council. Amidst allegations of a kick-back scheme Zambito dropped out of politics and is now working as a real-estate broker for Keller-Williams.

== Italian politics ==
Zambito ran for the Italian Senate in that country's 2006 general election, as a candidate of Silvio Berlusconi's Forza Italia party in an overseas Senate division reserved for Italian voters in North America and Central America. He appeared on the ballot as "Liborio Zambito." Berlusconi's list was defeated by Romano Prodi's coalition, known as The Union.

Zambito subsequently broke with Berlusconi's party and sought election to the Italian Chamber of Deputies in the 2013 Italian general election as a candidate of Mario Monti's With Monti for Italy coalition. Although Monti's list received enough votes for one regional seat, Zambito did not place first in the list's candidate preference votes and was once again not elected.

== Electoral record ==
Montreal municipal

2009 Montreal municipal election: Councillor, Saint-Léonard-Est division
Party	Candidate	Votes	%
Union Montreal	Robert Zambito	4,928	63.51
Vision Montreal	Raphaël Fortin	1,135	14.63
Projet Montréal	Franco Fiori	947	12.21
Action civique Montréal	Louise Blackburn	749	9.65
Total valid votes		7,759	
Source: Election results, 2009, City of Montreal.

2005 Montreal municipal election: Saint-Leonard borough Councillor, Saint-Léonard-Est division
Party	Candidate	Votes	%
Montreal Island Citizens Union	(x)Robert Zambito	4,762	64.82
Vision Montreal	Jean-Marc Boivin	1,478	20.12
Independent	Domenico Moschella	1,107	15.07
Total valid votes		7,347	100
Source: City of Montreal official results (in French), City of Montreal.

2001 Montreal municipal election: Saint-Leonard borough Councillor, Grande-Prairie division
Party	Candidate	Votes	%
Montreal Island Citizens Union	Robert Zambito	10,034	73.03
Vision Montreal	Lino Colapelle	3,705	26.97
Total valid votes		13,739	100
Source: Election results, 1833-2005 (in French), City of Montreal.

1998 Saint-Leonard municipal election: Councillor, Ward Ten
Party	Candidate	Votes	%
Parti municipal	(x)Robert Zambito	accl.	
Source: Irwin Block, "Second acclamation in a row for Zampino," Montreal Gazette, 15 October 1998, A6.

1994 Saint-Leonard municipal election: Councillor, Ward Twelve
Party	Candidate	Votes	%
Parti municipal	(x)Robert Zambito	845	53.45
Independent	Giacomo Vigna	736	46.55
Total valid votes		1,581	100
Source: Mike King, "Voting results: the final count," Montreal Gazette, 8 November 1994, A4.

1990 Saint-Leonard municipal election: Councillor, Ward Twelve
Party	Candidate	Votes	%
Parti municipal	(x)Robert Zambito	elected	
Source: Irwin Block, "St. Leonard votes for change as Cote St. Luc re-elects Lang," Montreal Gazette, 5 November 1990, A5.

1986 Saint-Leonard municipal election: Councillor, Ward Twelve
Party	Candidate	Votes	%
Ralliement de Saint-Léonard	Robert Zambito	787	39.95
Unité de Saint-Léonard	(x)Domenico Moschella	753	38.22
Équipe démocratique de Saint-Léonard	Jacques Amyot	216	10.96
Rassemblement des citoyens et citoyennes de Saint-Léonard	Michelango Cannistraro	214	10.86
Total valid votes		1,970	100
Source: "Results of council elections in 18 Montreal-area municipalities," Montreal Gazette, 3 November 1986, A8.

Quebec provincial

1985 Quebec general election: Dorion
Party	Candidate	Votes	%
Liberal	Violette Trépanier	12,724	51.71
Parti Québécois	Huguette Lachapelle	10,226	41.56
New Democratic	Paul Comtois	653	2.65
Progressive Conservative	Robert Zambito	290	1.18
Parti indépendantiste	Normand Lacasse	268	1.09
Humanist	Alain Despaties	155	0.63
Communist	Line Chabot	76	0.31
United Social Credit	Réal Bastien	66	0.27
Commonwealth of Canada	M. Luisa Grau	56	0.23
Christian Socialist	André St-Arnaud	55	0.22
N/A (Workers)	Mario Caluori	36	0.15
Total valid votes		24,605	
Rejected and declined votes		453	
Turnout		25,058	74.58
Electors on the lists		33,601	
Source: Official Results, Le Directeur général des élections du Québec.

Italian

2006 Italian general election results: Senate, North and Central America region

Party	Votes	%	Senators
The Union	32,036	38.03	1
Forza Italia	25,556	30.33	
For Italy in the World with Tremaglia	11,604	13.77	
Union of Christian and Centre Democrats	9,412	11.17	
Independent Alternative for Italians Abroad	3,191	3.79	
Northern League	1,389	1.65	
Tricolour Flame	1,061	1.26	
Total valid votes	84,249	100.00	

The Union candidate preference votes
Renato Turano (elected)	12,097
Rocco di Trolio	7,675

Forza Italia candidate preference votes
Augusto Sorriso	8,898
Liborio Zambito	5,387

For Italy in the World with Tremaglia candidate preference votes
Carlo Consiglio	5,446
Vincenzo Centofanti	2,531

Union of Christian and Centre Democrats candidate preference votes
Vittorio Coco	3,906
Bernardo Paradiso	2,885

Independent Alternative for Italians Abroad candidate preference votes
Domenico Serafini detto Dom	1,471
Sonia Marcella Spadoni	922

Northern League candidate preference votes
Salvatore Rappa	807

Tricolour Flame candidate preference votes
Alfredo Viti	415

Source: ARCHIVIO STORICO DELLE ELEZIONI - Consultazione dati: Senato 09/04/2006, Area ESTERO, Ripartizione AMERICA SETTENTRIONALE E CENTRALE, Ministerio dell'Interno, Government of Italy, accessed 27 July 2011. Voters were not required to give a preference vote for any candidate.
