= Violette Trépanier =

Canadian politician (born 1945)

Violette Trépanier (born March 14, 1945) is a Canadian politician in the province of Quebec. She was a Liberal member of the National Assembly of Quebec from 1985 to 1994 and was a minister in the governments of Robert Bourassa and Daniel Johnson.

== Early life and career ==
Trépanier was born in Montreal. She studied at the normal school of Saint-Lambert and has a bachelor's degree in education from the Université de Montréal (1966). She was a French teacher from 1966 to 1976.

Trépanier became a political attaché to legislator Jean-Pierre Saintonge in 1981. She was chosen as vice-president of the Quebec Liberal Party the following year and served in this capacity until 1985.

== Legislator and cabinet minister ==
Bourassa government

Trépanier was elected to the Quebec legislature in the 1985 provincial election, defeating Parti Québécois (PQ) incumbent Huguette Lachapelle in the Montreal division of Dorion. The Liberal Party won a majority government in this election, and Trépanier entered the legislature as a backbench supporter of Robert Bourassa's administration. From December 13, 1985, to March 3, 1989, she was the parliamentary assistant to the minister of municipal affairs.

She was promoted to the provincial ministry on March 3, 1989, serving as the junior minister responsible for cultural communities and immigration. She assisted Monique Gagnon-Tremblay, who held the full cabinet portfolio for these files. Trépanier was re-elected over PQ candidate Joseph Facal in the 1989 provincial election and was reassigned as the minister responsible for the status of women and minister responsible for the family on October 11, 1989.

During ceremonies marking the fiftieth anniversary of women's suffrage in Quebec in April 1990, Trépanier said that the greatest challenge of modern Quebec women was to create a society where family and work were compatible. "What women need is day care, flexible work schedules, maternity leave, pay equity and a lot of vigilance because the gains we have made are very fragile," she said. Later in the same year, she introduced a bill allowing parents to take thirty-four weeks of unpaid parental leave after the birth or adoption of a child; she described the bill as the first step toward paid parental leave. She also ensured passage of a bill requiring that all divorcing couples in Quebec equally split the value of most shared assets developed during their relationship.

Trépanier criticized the federal government of Brian Mulroney for cutting universal child care benefits and cancelling funding targeted to day care. She introduced legislation in April 1992 to guarantee mandatory child support payments in the event of a separation or divorce, create 7,500 new day care spaces in three years, and set aside $1.8 million for pilot projects to enhance family life. She also re-affirmed her support for Quebec's universal family allowance policy, intended to encourage couples to have more children, which was introduced shortly before she was appointed to cabinet.

In late 1993, she introduced a new government policy document on women that proposed an employment equity law for all public sector and some private sector organizations with over one hundred employees. Some provincial groups representing women criticized the document as being for the most part vague and unspecific.

Trépanier was the minister responsible for the status women at the time of the École Polytechnique massacre, in which lone gunman Marc Lepine shot and murdered fourteen women at the École Polytechnique de Montréal. In common with other female members of Bourassa's cabinet, Trépanier cautioned against interpreting the massacre as anything other than the act of a single psychopathic individual.

Johnson government

Trépanier supported Daniel Johnson's successful bid to succeed Robert Bourassa as leader of the Quebec Liberal Party and premier of Quebec in January 1994. When Johnson became premier on January 11, 1994, he appointed Trépanier to a full cabinet position as minister of revenue security. She also retained ministerial responsibility for the status of women and the family.

In March 1994, Trépanier and employment minister Serge Marcil announced a $17.2 million program to assist persons on social assistance in starting up small businesses. Critics charged that it would be ineffective as it required recipients to provide two thousand dollars in cash or goods toward their project; some argued this was an unrealistic sum. Trépanier later announced the expansion of a program that encouraged social assistance recipients to accept temporary jobs for non-profit organizations.

Trépanier also announced in March 1994 that Quebec would increase its monthly breastfeeding subsidy from $15 to $37.50, while simultaneously reducing funds for milk formula, in an effort to encourage more low-income women to nurse their infants. This decision received international attention.

She was not a candidate in the 1994 provincial election and formally resigned from cabinet on September 26, 1994. She became director of recruiting and financing for the Quebec Liberal Party in 2001 and still held this position as of 2010.

== Federal politics ==
Trépanier supported Liberal Party of Canada parliamentarian Marcel Prud'homme in his successful bid for re-election in the 1988 federal election.

== Electoral record ==
1989 Quebec general election: Dorion
Party	Candidate	Votes	%
Liberal	Violette Trépanier	11,632	51.00
Parti Québécois	Joseph Facal	9,425	41.33
Green	Agnès Grimaud	878	3.85
New Democratic	Gaétan Nadeau	437	1.92
Lemon	Pierre Corbeil	297	1.30
Marxist–Leninist	Francine Tremblay	137	0.60
Total valid votes		22,806	100.00
Rejected and declined votes		421	
Turnout		23,227	76.03
Electors on the lists		30,551	
Source: Official Results, Le Directeur général des élections du Québec.

1985 Quebec general election: Dorion
Party	Candidate	Votes	%
Liberal	Violette Trépanier	12,724	51.71
Parti Québécois	Huguette Lachapelle	10,226	41.56
New Democratic	Paul Comtois	653	2.65
Progressive Conservative	Robert Zambito	290	1.18
Parti indépendantiste	Normand Lacasse	268	1.09
Humanist	Alain Despaties	155	0.63
Communist	Line Chabot	76	0.31
United Social Credit	Réal Bastien	66	0.27
Commonwealth of Canada	M. Luisa Grau	56	0.23
Christian Socialist	André St-Arnaud	55	0.22
N/A (Workers)	Mario Caluori	36	0.15
Total valid votes		24,605	
Rejected and declined votes		453	
Turnout		25,058	74.58
Electors on the lists		33,601	
Source: Official Results, Le Directeur général des élections du Québec.
