= Jean-Paul Poulin =

Canadian politician

Jean-Paul Poulin (French pronunciation: [ʒɑ̃ pɔl pulɛ̃]) was a politician in the Canadian province of Quebec. He was active in the Canadian social credit movement and led the Parti crédit social uni (PSCU; English: United Social Credit Party) through four general elections at the provincial level.

== Private career ==
A travelling salesman for many years, Poulin worked as a night watchman in Montreal at the end of the 1970s. In a 1981 interview, he recalled how he convinced farmers to paint their barns with the slogan, "Social Credit is Coming", during the 1960s.

== Politician ==
=== Early political activities ===
Poulin first ran for the Social Credit Party of Canada in the 1962 federal election. This party split into two factions the following year, when Réal Caouette formed a separate group called the Ralliement des créditistes. Poulin ran for Caouette's party in the 1968 federal election and also ran for the Ralliement national, a provincial social credit party not endorsed by Caouette, in the 1966 provincial election.

In 1969, the Ralliement des créditistes entered provincial politics by running candidates in four Quebec by-elections. At around the same time, Poulin established a dissident party called the Parti crédit social uni. Then fifty-one years old, he said that he and his allies did not support the way Caouette was running the party. He also indicated that he supported a "strong Quebec in a united Canada".

Poulin ran against the official Ralliement créditiste du Québec candidate in Saint-Jacques in a 1969 by-election. He also ran against an official Créditiste candidate in a 1971 by-election. He was defeated both times, as were all others who ran for his party.

The PSCU seems to have disappeared after this time, and Poulin and his supporters seem to have joined the re-united Social Credit Party of Canada under Caouette's leadership in 1971 or thereafter. Poulin ran for the re-united party in the 1974 federal election.

=== Return of the PSCU ===
The provincial Ralliement créditiste du Québec, which was aligned with the federal party, ceased operations in 1978. The PSCU was subsequently re-established, and Poulin again became the party's leader. He stood in three general elections and four by-elections over the next decade, never bringing his party above fringe status.

During the 1981 provincial election, the Montreal Gazette described PCSU as a "hard core" Créditiste group and identified Poulin as a follower of Major C.H. Douglas's economic theories. When interviewed by the paper, Poulin held up a copy of his party's manifesto and said, "This was written in 1966 and I haven't had to change a word."

Poulin was asked for his opinion on abortion during the 1989 provincial election. Perhaps unusually, in light of the Social Credit Party's general social conservatism, he declined to give an opinion and said that the issue should be decided by women alone. In the same election, Poulin said that social credit monetarist policies could not be implemented in Canada at the provincial level; he promised to instead target unemployment if elected. He was seventy-two years old at the time.

The party was deregistered in 1994.

== Electoral record ==
Provincial

1989 Quebec general election: Rosemont
Party	Candidate	Votes	%
Liberal	Guy Rivard (incumbent)	13,121	46.97
Parti Québécois	Sylvain Simard	12,988	46.50
New Democratic	Pierre Dion	620	2.22
Progressive Conservative	Lyse T. Giguère	298	1.07
Parti indépendantiste	Richard Belleau	278	1.00
Workers	Régis Beaulieu	256	0.92
Commonwealth of Canada	Normand Bélanger	134	0.48
United Social Credit	Jean-Paul Poulin	92	0.33
Marxist–Leninist	France Tremblay	79	0.28
Socialist Movement	Jean-Yves Desgagnés	67	0.24
Total valid votes		27,933	
Rejected and declined votes		862	
Turnout		28,795	75.65
Electors on the lists		38,064	
Source: Official Results, Le Directeur général des élections du Québec.

1985 Quebec general election: Rosemont
Party	Candidate	Votes	%
Liberal	Guy Rivard	14,810	52.65
Parti Québécois	Lise Denis	11,745	41.75
New Democratic	Roger Lamarre	742	2.64
Parti indépendantiste	Louise Brouillet	394	1.40
Humanist	Sylvie Lepage	183	0.65
United Social Credit	Jean-Paul Poulin	104	0.37
Communist	Claude Demers	83	0.30
Commonwealth of Canada	Louis Julien	43	0.15
Christian Socialist	Carlos Zencovich	27	0.10
Total valid votes		28,131	
Rejected and declined votes		485	
Turnout		28,616	75.11
Electors on the lists		38,101	

Quebec provincial by-election, June 3, 1985: L'Assomption
Party	Candidate	Votes	%
Liberal	Jean-Guy Gervais	12,019	46.71
Progressive Conservative	André Asselin	8,180	31.79
Parti Québécois	Denis Taillon	5,131	19.94
United Social Credit	Jean-Paul Poulin	229	0.89
Commonwealth of Canada	Jacques Lambert	174	0.68
Total valid votes		25,733	
Rejected and declined votes		789	
Turnout		26,522	55.08
Electors on the lists		48,148	
Source: Official Results, Government of Quebec

Quebec provincial by-election, June 20, 1983: Saint-Jacques
Party	Candidate	Votes	%
Liberal	Serge Champagne	6,911	44.22
Parti Québécois	Jeannine Chéron	6,436	41.18
Union Nationale	Michel Ouellette	492	3.15
Non-Affiliated	Dominique Langevin	423	2.71
Independent	Robert Wilkins	368	2.35
Independent	Roméo Lizotte	302	1.93
Workers	Gérard Lachance	281	1.80
Independent	Colette Provost	200	1.28
United Social Credit	Jean-Paul Poulin	53	0.34
Independent	Patricia Métivier	50	0.32
Independent	Paul Désormiers	46	0.29
Non-Affiliated	Claude Guertin	34	0.22
Commonwealth of Canada	Paul Rochon	33	0.21
Total valid votes		15,629	
Rejected and declined votes		345	
Turnout		15,974	52.28
Electors on the lists		30,552	
Source: Official Results, Government of Quebec

1981 Quebec general election: Shefford
Party	Candidate	Votes	%
Parti Québécois	Roger Paré	15,632	46.78
Liberal	Richard Verreault (incumbent)	14,905	44.60
Union Nationale	Luc Bouchard	2,725	8.15
United Social Credit	Jean-Paul Poulin	156	0.47
Total valid votes		33,418	100.00
Rejected and declined votes		362	
Turnout		33,780	85.71
Electors on the lists		39,410	

Quebec provincial by-election, November 17, 1980: Mégantic-Compton
Party	Candidate	Votes	%	±%
Liberal	Fabien Bélanger	9,259	46.95	
Parti Québécois	Richard Labelle	7,135	36.18	
Union Nationale	Fernand A. Grenier	3,162	16.04	–
United Social Credit	Jean-Paul Poulin	163	0.83	
Total valid votes		19,719		
Rejected and declined votes		144		
Turnout		19,863	70.38	
Electors on the lists		28,222		
Source: Official Results, Government of Quebec

Quebec provincial by-election, November 14, 1979: Prévost
Party	Candidate	Votes	%	±%
Liberal	Solange Chaput-Rolland	25,717	63.06	
Parti Québécois	Pierre Harvey	14,433	35.39	
Workers	Richard Lépine	298	0.73	
United Social Credit	Jean-Paul Poulin	257	0.63	
Independent	Marc Blouin	78	0.19	
Total valid votes		40,783	100.00	
Rejected and declined votes		1,145		
Turnout		41,928	77.98	
Electors on the lists		53,771		
Source: Official Results, Government of Quebec

Quebec provincial by-election, February 8, 1971: Chambly
Party	Candidate	Votes	%	±%
Liberal	Jean Cournoyer	22,647	64.57	
Parti Québécois	Pierre Marois	11,452	32.65	
Ralliement créditiste	Clément Patry	665	1.90	
Independent	Luke G. Dougherty	267	0.76	
Independent	Lionel Desjardins	18	0.05	
United Social Credit	Jean-Paul Poulin	17	0.05	
Independent	Claude Longtin	7	0.02	
Total valid votes		35,073	100.00	
Rejected and declined votes		928		
Turnout		36,001	68.19	
Electors on the lists		52,795		
Source: Results of February 8, 1971 by-election, Élections Québec

Quebec provincial by-election, October 8, 1969: Saint-Jacques
Party	Candidate	Votes	%	±%
Union Nationale	Jean Cournoyer	5,695	71.73	–
Ralliement créditiste	Jean-Marc Fontaine	1,050	13.22	
Independent	Jean Desautels	407	5.13	
Independent	André Coallier	374	4.71	
United Social Credit	Jean-Paul Poulin	220	2.77	
Independent	Henri-Georges Grenier	194	2.44	
Total valid votes		7,940	100.00	
Rejected and declined votes		767		
Turnout		8,707	29.51	
Electors on the lists		29,503		
Source: Official Results, Government of Quebec

1966 Quebec general election: Saint-Jacques
Party	Candidate	Votes	%	±%
Union Nationale	Paul Dozois (incumbent)	9,869	49.97	–
Liberal	Jacques Guilbault	7,663	38.80	
RIN	Paul Mainville	1,834	9.29	
Ralliement national	Jean-Paul Poulin	383	1.94	
Total valid votes		19,749	100.00	
Rejected and declined votes		458		
Turnout		20,207	57.68	
Electors on the lists		35,035		
Source: Rapport du président général des élections (Quebec), Élections 1966.

There was also a Jean-Paul Poulin who ran as a Liberal candidate in Labelle in the 1962 provincial election, but it is not clear if this was the same person.

Federal

1974 Canadian federal election: Saint-Henri
Party	Candidate	Votes	%	±%
Liberal	Gérard Loiselle (incumbent)	8,813	52.02	
Progressive Conservative	Lucien Jarraud	6,147	36.29	
New Democratic	Gus Callaghan	922	5.44	
Social Credit	Jean-Paul Poulin	633	3.74	
Independent	Louis Grégoire	306	1.81	
Marxist–Leninist	Robert Perrault	119	0.70	
Total valid votes		16,940	100.00	
Total rejected ballots		724		
Turnout		17,664	61.27	
Electors on the lists		28,832		
lop.parl.ca

1968 Canadian federal election: Beauharnois
Party	Candidate	Votes	%
Liberal	Gérald Laniel (incumbent)	17,203	59.82
Progressive Conservative	Armand Miron	8,703	30.26
New Democratic	Joseph-Aurèle Patafie	1,764	6.13
Ralliement créditiste	Jean-Paul Poulin	1,087	3.78
Total valid votes		28,757	
Total rejected ballots		550	
Turnout		29,307	72.33
Electors on the lists		40,519	

1962 Canadian federal election: Saint-Jacques
Party	Candidate	Votes	%	±%
Liberal	Maurice Rinfret	7,664	40.59	
Progressive Conservative	Gérard Hébert	7,271	38.51	
Social Credit	Jean-Paul Poulin	2,023	10.71	
New Democratic	Willie Fortin	1,925	10.19	
Total valid votes		18,883	100.00	
Total rejected ballots		431		
Turnout		19,314	58.39	
Electors on the lists		33,079		
