= Dorion (provincial electoral district) =

Quebec electoral district
- Coordinates: 45.540143°N 73.627882°W

Defunct provincial electoral district
- Legislature: National Assembly of Quebec
- District created: 1965
- District abolished: 1992
- First contested: 1966
- Last contested: 1989

Demographics
- Census division(s): Montreal (part)
- Census subdivision(s): Montreal (part)

Dorion (French pronunciation: [dɔʁjɔ̃]) was a provincial electoral district in the province of Quebec, Canada.

It corresponded to the Villeray neighbourhood in Montreal.

It was created for the 1966 election from parts of Montréal-Outremont, Montréal–Jeanne-Mance and Montréal-Laurier electoral districts. Its final election was in 1989. It disappeared in the 1994 election and its successor electoral district was Laurier-Dorion.

A Montréal-Dorion district also existed from 1912 to 1939.

The electoral district was named in honour of a prime minister of the United Province of Canada, Antoine-Aimé Dorion.

== Members of the Legislative Assembly / National Assembly ==
| Legislature | Years | Member | Party |
|---|---|---|---|
Riding created from Montréal-Outremont, Montréal–Jeanne-Mance and Montréal-Laurier
| 28th | 1966–1968 | François Aquin | Liberal |
| 28th | 1969–1970 | Mario Beaulieu | Union Nationale |
| 29th | 1970–1973 | Alfred Bossé | Liberal |
| 30th | 1973–1976 | Alfred Bossé | Liberal |
| 31st | 1976–1981 | Lise Payette | Parti Québécois |
| 32nd | 1981–1985 | Huguette Lachapelle | Parti Québécois |
| 33rd | 1985–1989 | Violette Trépanier | Liberal |
| 34th | 1989–1994 | Violette Trépanier | Liberal |
Dissolved into Laurier-Dorion

== Election results ==
1989 Quebec general election
| Party | Candidate | Votes | % |
|---|---|---|---|
| Liberal | Violette Trépanier | 11,632 | 51.00 |
| Parti Québécois | Joseph Facal | 9,425 | 41.33 |
| Green | Agnès Grimaud | 878 | 3.85 |
| New Democratic | Gaétan Nadeau | 437 | 1.92 |
| Lemon | Pierre Corbeil | 297 | 1.30 |
| Marxist–Leninist | Francine Tremblay | 137 | 0.60 |
| Total valid votes | | 22,806 | 100.00 |
| Rejected and declined votes | | 421 | |
| Turnout | | 23,227 | 76.03 |
| Electors on the lists | | 30,551 | |
Source: Official Results, Le Directeur général des élections du Québec.

1985 Quebec general election
| Party | Candidate | Votes | % |
|---|---|---|---|
| Liberal | Violette Trépanier | 12,724 | 51.71 |
| Parti Québécois | Huguette Lachapelle | 10,226 | 41.56 |
| New Democratic | Paul Comtois | 653 | 2.65 |
| Progressive Conservative | Robert Zambito | 290 | 1.18 |
| Parti indépendantiste | Normand Lacasse | 268 | 1.09 |
| Humanist | Alain Despaties | 155 | 0.63 |
| Communist | Line Chabot | 76 | 0.31 |
| United Social Credit | Réal Bastien | 66 | 0.27 |
| Commonwealth of Canada | M. Luisa Grau | 56 | 0.23 |
| Christian Socialist | André St-Arnaud | 55 | 0.22 |
| N/A (Workers) | Mario Caluori | 36 | 0.15 |
| Total valid votes | | 24,605 | |
| Rejected and declined votes | | 453 | |
| Turnout | | 25,058 | 74.58 |
| Electors on the lists | | 33,601 | |
Source: Official Results, Le Directeur général des élections du Québec.

1981 Quebec general election
| Party | Candidate | Votes | % |
|---|---|---|---|
| Parti Québécois | Huguette Lachapelle | 14,551 | 51.54 |
| Liberal | Henri-François Gautrin | 12,657 | 44.83 |
| Union Nationale | François Lefebvre | 524 | 1.86 |
| Workers Communist | Suzanne Barbeau Foisy | 161 | 0.57 |
| Workers | Gilles Frenière | 114 | 0.40 |
| Marxist–Leninist | Ginette Boutet | 88 | 0.31 |
| Independent | Raymond Beaudoin | 74 | 0.26 |
| United Social Credit | Fernand Bélisle | 66 | 0.23 |
| Total valid votes | | 28,235 | 100.00 |
| Rejected and declined votes | | 666 | |
| Turnout | | 28,901 | 82.58 |
| Electors on the lists | | 34,997 | |
Source: Official Results, Le Directeur général des élections du Québec.
