= Gérald Godin =

Canadian poet and politician

Member for Mercier
- In office 1976–1994
- Preceded by: Robert Bourassa

Minister of Cultural Communities and Immigration

Personal details
- Born: November 13, 1938 Trois-Rivières, Quebec, Canada
- Died: October 12, 1994 (aged 55) Montreal, Quebec, Canada
- Party: Parti Québécois
- Spouse: Pauline Julien
- Occupation: Poet; journalist; politician

Gérald Godin (November 13, 1938 – October 12, 1994) was a Canadian poet and politician from Quebec. During his time as a politician, he served in various cabinet posts in the governments of René Lévesque and Pierre-Marc Johnson. As cabinet minister, Godin has been noted for his openness towards immigrants.

== Biography ==
Born in Trois-Rivières, he worked as a journalist at La Presse and other newspapers and magazines. His most important poetry collection, Les cantouques: poèmes en langue verte, populaire et quelquefois française, was published in 1967. He was among those arrested under the War Measures Act during the October Crisis in 1970.

=== Political career ===
In the 1976 Quebec provincial election, he won a seat as a candidate for the Parti Québécois (PQ), heavily defeating incumbent Premier Robert Bourassa in his own riding of Mercier.

He served in various cabinet posts in the governments of René Lévesque and Pierre-Marc Johnson. His most notable role was Minister of Cultural Communities and Immigration. Godin saw immigrants as the future of Quebec’s sovereigntist movement by believing that they should be welcomed and acknowledged that they left due to negative impact of authoritarianism in their home country. However, he felt that immigrants should respect Quebec history and integrate into Québécois society.

Godin also avoided scapegoating immigrants. In 1984, during an interview with Radio Canada on the topic of undocumented immigrants, he rejected the idea of that Canada borders should be tighten towards poorer countries, by responding that countries like Canada should utilize their strengths. In 1993, after the Charlottetown Accord failed to pass, Godin was furious when Jacques Parizeau, who proclaimed that sovereignty could be achieved without Anglophones and Allophones of Quebec, by telling Le Devoir that Parizeau comment 'scraped' previous effort of outreach done by the PQ.

== Personal life and death ==
His life companion was the Québécois singer Pauline Julien. Godin died from brain cancer in October 1994.

== Legacy ==
As a poet, he won the Prix Québec-Paris for his 1987 work Ils ne demandaient qu'à brûler.

The area surrounding the Mont-Royal metro station has been named Place Gérald-Godin in his honour. One of his poems, Tango de Montréal, described as a lyrical tribute to the immigrants in Montreal, is displayed as a mural overlooking the square.

Cégep Gérald-Godin (college), in Sainte-Geneviève, Montreal, is named after him.

== Electoral record ==
1989 Quebec general election: Mercier
Party	Candidate	Votes	%	±%
Parti Québécois	Gérald Godin	13,371	57.15	+10.04
Liberal	Daniel Gagnon	7,117	30.42	−12.39
Green	Manon Dubé	1,961	8.38	+6.67
New Democratic	Robert Saint-Louis	567	2.42	−2.27
Workers	Philippe Pouyer	168	0.72	+0.60
Marxist–Leninist	Arnold August	108	0.46	–
Socialist Movement	Gérard Talbot	106	0.45	–
Source: Official Results, Le Directeur général des élections du Québec.

1985 Quebec general election: Mercier
Party	Candidate	Votes	%	±%
Parti Québécois	Gérald Godin	12,062	47.11	−7.42
Liberal	John Parisella	10,960	42.81	+1.43
New Democratic	Roger Couvrette	1,200	4.69	
Green	Yves Blanchette	437	1.71	
Humanist	Colette Renaud	348	1.36	
Parti indépendantiste	Denis Bourgeois	319	1.24	
Independent	Gilles Côté	97	0.38	−0.02
Commonwealth of Canada	Elena Mendez	75	0.29	
Communist	Gaetan Trudel	73	0.29	
No designation	Philippe Pouyer	31	0.12	
Total valid votes		25,602		
Rejected and declined votes		451		
Turnout		26,053	71.12	
Electors on the lists		36,635		
Source: Official Results, Le Directeur général des élections du Québec.

1981 Quebec general election: Mercier
Party	Candidate	Votes	%	±%
Parti Québécois	Gérald Godin	16,252	54.53	+3.15
Liberal	Yves Bériault	12,333	41.38	+4.27
Union Nationale	Roger Courtemanche	495	1.66	−5.89
Workers Communist	Roger Rashi	250	0.84	-
Marxist–Leninist	Jacques Côté	125	0.42	-
United Social Credit	Gilles Côté	118	0.40	−2.07
Independent	Richard Langlois	116	0.39	-
Workers	Gérard Lachance	115	0.38	+0.08
Total valid votes		29,804	100,00	
Total rejected ballots		489	1,61	
Turnout		30,293	79.92	
Eligible voters		37,904		
Parti Québécois hold		Swing		−0.56
Source: Official Results, Le Directeur général des élections du Québec.

1976 Quebec general election: Mercier
Party	Candidate	Votes	%	±%
Parti Québécois	Gérald Godin	13,450	51.38	+9.57
Liberal	Robert Bourassa (incumbent)	9,714	37.11	−15.76
Union Nationale	Giuseppe Anzini	1,975	7.55	+5.97
Ralliement créditiste	Robert Roy	647	2.47	−0.64
New Democratic Party of Quebec - RMS coalition	Henri-François Gautrin	139	0.53	-
Communist	Guy Desautels	116	0.44	-
Workers	Gaston Morin	77	0.30	-
No designation	Louise Ouimet	58	0.22	-
Source: Official Results, Le Directeur général des élections du Québec.
Parti Québécois gain from Liberal		Swing		+12.67
