= Parti crédit social uni candidates in the 1985 Quebec provincial election =

The Parti crédit social uni (PCSU; English: United Social Credit Party) ran twelve candidates in the 1985 provincial election, none of whom were elected. Information about these candidates may be found on this page.

== Candidates ==
=== Dorion: Réal Bastien ===
Réal Bastien received 66 votes (0.27%), finishing eighth against Liberal candidate Violette Trépanier.

=== Laporte: Joseph Ranger ===
Joseph Ranger was a longtime activist for Quebec's social credit movement and a perennial candidate for political office, having run in eight provincial elections and two federal elections. A report in The Globe and Mail lists him as having been fifty-four years old in 1969. He identified as a truck driver in 1968 and as a pensioner in 1974.

Ranger ran for the Ralliement national in the 1966 provincial election and for Réal Caouette's Ralliement des créditistes in the 1968 federal election. He later joined the Parti crédit social uni, a dissident group that opposed Caouette's leadership, and ran for this party in two provincial elections. The division between the parties seems to have been resolved, and Ranger was a candidate for Caouette's re-united Social Credit Party of Canada in the 1974 federal election.

The official provincial wing of the Social Credit Party wound down at the end of the 1970s, and the PCSU was revived in 1979 as a replacement. Ranger ran for this party five times in the early to mid-1980s.

A candidate named Joseph Ranger ran for a school trustee position on the south shore of Montreal in late 1985; for the purposes of this article, it is assumed this was the same person. A different Joseph Ranger served as a municipal politician in western Quebec in the same period.

Electoral record
Election	Division	Party	Votes	%	Place	Winner
1966 provincial	Sainte-Anne	Ralliement national	208	1.22	6/6	Frank Hanley, Independent
1968 federal	Saint-Henri	Créditiste	608	3.02	5/5	Gérard Loiselle, Liberal
provincial by-election, 8 October 1969	Vaudreuil-Soulanges	N/A (Crédit social uni)	601	5.10	3/3	Francis-Édouard Belliveau, Union Nationale
1970 provincial	Vaudreuil-Soulanges	N/A (Crédit social uni)	53	0.22	5/5	Paul Phaneuf, Liberal
1974 federal	Westmount	Social Credit	412	1.14	4/5	Charles Drury, Liberal
provincial by-election, 13 April 1980	Brome—Missisquoi	Crédit social uni	107	0.50	4/4	Pierre Paradis, Liberal
1981 provincial	Marie-Victorin	Crédit social uni	74	0.25	6/6	Pierre Marois, Parti Québécois
provincial by-election, 20 June 1983	Charlesbourg	Crédit social uni	75	0.30	6/6	Marc-Yvan Côté, Liberal
provincial by-election, 3 June 1985	Bertrand	Crédit social uni	182	0.68	4/7	Robert Bourassa, Liberal
1985 provincial	Laporte	Crédit social uni	62	0.21	7/7	André Barbeau, Liberal
1985 school board	Jacques-Cartier Trustee, Ward Three	n/a	3	1.84	2/2	Annette Gagne

Sources: Official Voting Results, Office of the Chief Electoral Officer (Canada), 1968 and 1972; Rapport du président général des élections, Élections 1966 and 1970; Official Results, Le Directeur général des élections du Québec (online source), 1969, 1980, 1981, 1983, 1985 (by-election), and 1985 (general election); Sandy Senyk, "School board elections drew low voter turnout," Montreal Gazette, 11 December 1985, A5.
