= Robert Bourassa =

Premier of Quebec (1970–1976; 1985–1994)

Robert Bourassa GOQ
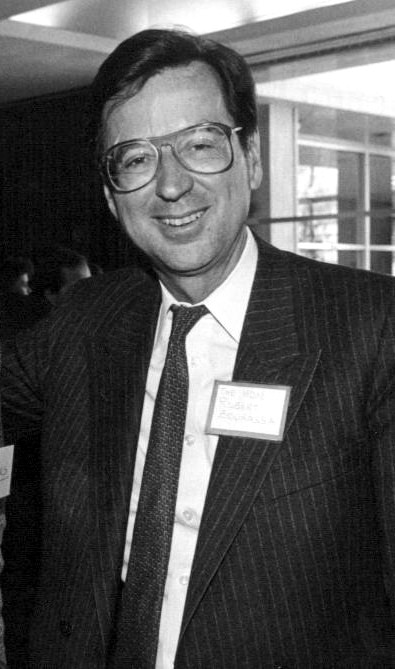

22nd Premier of Quebec
- In office May 12, 1970 – November 25, 1976
- Monarch: Elizabeth II
- Lieutenant Governor: Hugues Lapointe
- Deputy: Pierre Laporte (1970); Gérard D. Levesque (1972–1976)
- Preceded by: Jean-Jacques Bertrand
- Succeeded by: René Lévesque
- In office December 12, 1985 – January 11, 1994
- Monarch: Elizabeth II
- Lieutenant Governor: Gilles Lamontagne; Martial Asselin
- Deputy: Lise Bacon
- Preceded by: Pierre-Marc Johnson
- Succeeded by: Daniel Johnson Jr.

MNA for Mercier
- In office June 5, 1966 – November 25, 1976
- Preceded by: District created
- Succeeded by: Gérald Godin

MNA for Saint-Laurent
- In office January 20, 1986 – January 11, 1994
- Preceded by: Germain Leduc
- Succeeded by: Normand Cherry

MNA for Bertrand
- In office June 3, 1985 – December 2, 1985
- Preceded by: Denis Lazure
- Succeeded by: Jean-Guy Parent

Personal details
- Born: Jean-Robert Bourassa; July 14, 1933 Montreal, Quebec, Canada
- Died: October 2, 1996 (aged 63) Montreal, Quebec, Canada
- Resting place: Notre Dame des Neiges Cemetery
- Party: Quebec Liberal Party
- Spouse: Andrée Simard (m. 1958)
- Education: Collège Jean-de-Brébeuf; Université de Montréal; Keble College, Oxford; Harvard University
- Profession: Financial advisor; teacher; lawyer

Robert Bourassa (French pronunciation: [ʁɔbɛʁ buʁasa]; July 14, 1933 – October 2, 1996) was a Canadian lawyer and politician who served as the 22nd premier of Quebec from 1970 to 1976 and from 1985 to 1994. A member of the Liberal Party of Quebec, he served a total of just under 15 years as premier. Bourassa's tenure was marked by major events affecting Quebec, including the October Crisis and the Meech Lake and Charlottetown Accords.

== Early years and education ==
Bourassa was born to a working class family in Montreal, the son of Adrienne (née Courville; 1897–1982) and Aubert Bourassa, a port authority worker. Robert Bourassa graduated from the Université de Montréal law school in 1956 and was admitted to the Barreau du Québec the following year. On August 23, 1958, he married Andrée Simard (1931–2022), heiress to the powerful shipbuilding Simard family of Sorel, Quebec. Later, he studied at Keble College, University of Oxford and also obtained a degree in political economy at Harvard University in 1960. On his return to Quebec, he was employed at the federal Department of National Revenue as a fiscal adviser. He also worked as a professor of public finance at Université de Montréal and Université Laval.

== Quebec legislator ==
Bourassa was first elected as a member of the Legislative Assembly of Quebec (MLA) for the riding of Mercier in 1966, then won the Quebec Liberal Party leadership election on January 17, 1970. He positioned himself as a young, competent administrator. He chose "100,000 jobs" as his slogan, which emphasized that job creation would be his priority. Bourassa felt the extensive hydro-electric resources of Quebec were the most effective means of completing the modernization of Quebec and sustaining job creation. He successfully led his party into government in the 1970 election, defeating the conservative Union Nationale government and becoming the youngest premier in Quebec history.

== Premier of Quebec (1970–1976) ==
One of Bourassa's first crises as premier was the October Crisis of 1970, in which his deputy, Pierre Laporte, was kidnapped and later murdered by members of the Front de libération du Quebec. Bourassa requested that Prime Minister Pierre Trudeau invoke the War Measures Act, which allowed for search and arrest of anyone associated with, or thought to be associated with the FLQ. Bourassa also requisitioned military assistance using provisions of the National Defence Act, which resulted in the deployment of troops to guard vital points in Montreal and assist police. The Canadian Armed Forces were withdrawn on 4 January 1971, and Paul Rose and some of his accomplices were found guilty of murder later that year.

Bourassa and Trudeau often clashed over issues of federal-provincial relations and Quebec nationalism, with Trudeau opposing what he saw as concessions to sovereignism. In June 1971 he participated in an attempt at constitutional reform, the Victoria Charter, which quickly unravelled when Bourassa backed away from the proposed deal after it was strongly criticized by Quebec opinion leaders for not giving Quebec more powers.

On 8 October 1971, Trudeau announced in the House of Commons that, after much deliberation, the policy of multiculturalism would be implemented in Canada. Bourassa documented his strong opposition to Trudeau's policy in a letter which he released to the press on 17 November 1971, and stated he had "serious misgivings about the principle of the multicultural policy". The policy document tabled in the House "dissociates culture from language", which seemed to Bourassa "a questionable basis on which to found a policy". Bourassa declared that Quebec did not accept the federal government's approach to the principle of multiculturalism.

During his time in power, Bourassa implemented policies aimed at protecting the status of the French language in Quebec. In 1974, he introduced Bill 22, which declared French to be the sole official language of the province. As a result, Quebec was no longer institutionally bilingual (French and English), though the rights of anglophones were still protected under the British North America Acts. Many businesses and professionals were unable to operate under such requirements. Bill 22 angered Anglophones while not going far enough for many Francophones; Bourassa was vilified by both groups. In response Trudeau described Bourassa as a “mangeur de hot-dogs” (“hotdog eater”).

Bourassa initiated the James Bay hydroelectric project in 1971 that led to the James Bay and Northern Quebec Agreement of 1975 with the Cree and Inuit inhabitants of the region. The Bourassa government also played a major role in rescuing the 1976 Olympic Games in Montreal from huge cost overruns and construction delays. Bourassa's government became embroiled in corruption scandals.

On 21 March 1974, workers belonging to the Fédération des travailleurs et travailleuses du Québec union working on the LG-2 construction site of the James Bay project rioted using their bulldozers to destroy the site they were working on while other workers set buildings afire. The riot caused $35 million in damage, and was part of an extortion attempt on the part of the union boss André "Dédé" Desjardins, who was known in Quebec as the "King of Construction". In response to the violence at the LG-2 site, which confirmed long-standing rumors about thuggish practices on the part of construction unions, Bourassa appointed a commission consisting of a well respected judge Robert Cliche, a prominent Montreal labour lawyer Brian Mulroney and Guy Chevrette, the vice-president of the Centrale de l'enseignement du Québec, whose legal counsel was another prominent lawyer Lucien Bouchard to investigate corruption in the construction industry in Quebec. The Cliche commission as it became known held 68 days of hearings on live TV, interviewing 279 people from the construction industry, who testified to widespread corruption and violence in the construction industry, and to the close ties between the Bourassa cabinet, the Mafia and corrupt construction union bosses. Bouchard had wanted to have Bourassa testify before the commission, but Mulroney prevented this, saying that having the Premier of Quebec testify before the commission would be a violation of "executive privilege". Nonetheless, the Cliche commission established the Quebec construction industry was dominated by a casual brutality with thuggish union bosses teaching union organizers how best to break legs. Workers who complained about corruption on the part of their bosses had their dogs murdered and their teenage children beaten up.

When the Cliche commission presented its report in May 1975, the document was described as an exposé of "an organized system of corruption without parallel in North America" as the commission noted that it was political corruption that had enabled the corruption in the construction industry. In an editorial, the Montreal Gazette wrote about the Cliche commission report: "A devastating document. For some four years, the Bourassa government worked hand in glove with gangster union leadership in the province's construction industry." The Cliche commission had little impact on the problem of corruption in the Quebec construction industry, but turned public opinion against Bourassa, whose special adviser had asked the corrupt construction unions to help the Liberals win a by-election in exchange for giving firms that employed workers in the corrupt unions exclusive contracts to work on the James Bay project.

Bourassa lost the 1976 provincial election to René Lévesque, leader of the sovereigntist Parti Québécois, in a massive landslide brought on by the language controversy and the corruption scandals, among other things. Bourassa himself was heavily defeated in his own riding by PQ challenger Gérald Godin. He resigned as Liberal Party leader and accepted teaching positions in Europe and the United States. He remained in political exile until he returned to politics by winning the Quebec Liberal Party leadership election on October 15, 1983. On June 3, 1985, he won a by-election in Bertrand.

== Out of politics (1976–1985) ==
Bourassa resigned as Liberal leader and exiled himself for nine years into academic obscurity. During these nine years, he spent his time overseas. In 1980, Bourassa campaigned in favour of the "no" side (which was eventually successful) of the 1980 Quebec referendum on a sovereignty-association agreement with the federal government. In 1983, Bourassa was elected Liberal leader again, replacing Claude Ryan.

== Premier of Quebec (1985–1994) ==
Bourassa led the PLQ to victory in the 1985 election. However, he lost his own seat to Parti Québécois candidate Jean-Guy Parent. On January 20, 1986, he was elected in a by-election in the Liberal stronghold of Saint-Laurent after the sitting Liberal MNA Germain Leduc resigned in his favour.

During his second term as premier, Bourassa in 1988 invoked the notwithstanding clause of the Canadian Charter of Rights and Freedoms to override a Supreme Court of Canada ruling that declared parts of the Charter of the French Language unconstitutional, causing some of his anglophone ministers to resign. In 1993, however, he introduced modifications to the language charter. These compromises reduced the controversy over language that had been a dominant feature of Quebec politics over the previous decades.

During the Oka Crisis in 1990, Bourassa invoked the National Defence Act for the second time, requisitioning the Canadian Armed Forces to help police.

Bourassa also pushed for Quebec to be acknowledged in the Canadian constitution as a "distinct society", promising Quebec residents that their grievances could be resolved within Canada with a new constitutional deal. He worked closely with Prime Minister Brian Mulroney and received many concessions from the federal government, culminating in the Meech Lake Accord in 1987 and the Charlottetown Accord in 1992. The Meech Lake Accord failed in June 1990 when two provinces, Manitoba and Newfoundland, refused to ratify the agreement their premiers had signed. That failure revived the Quebec separatist movement. The Charlottetown Accord was defeated in a nationwide plebiscite in 1992; it was heavily defeated even in Quebec, partly due to the perception that Bourassa had given away too much at the negotiations.

== Final years ==
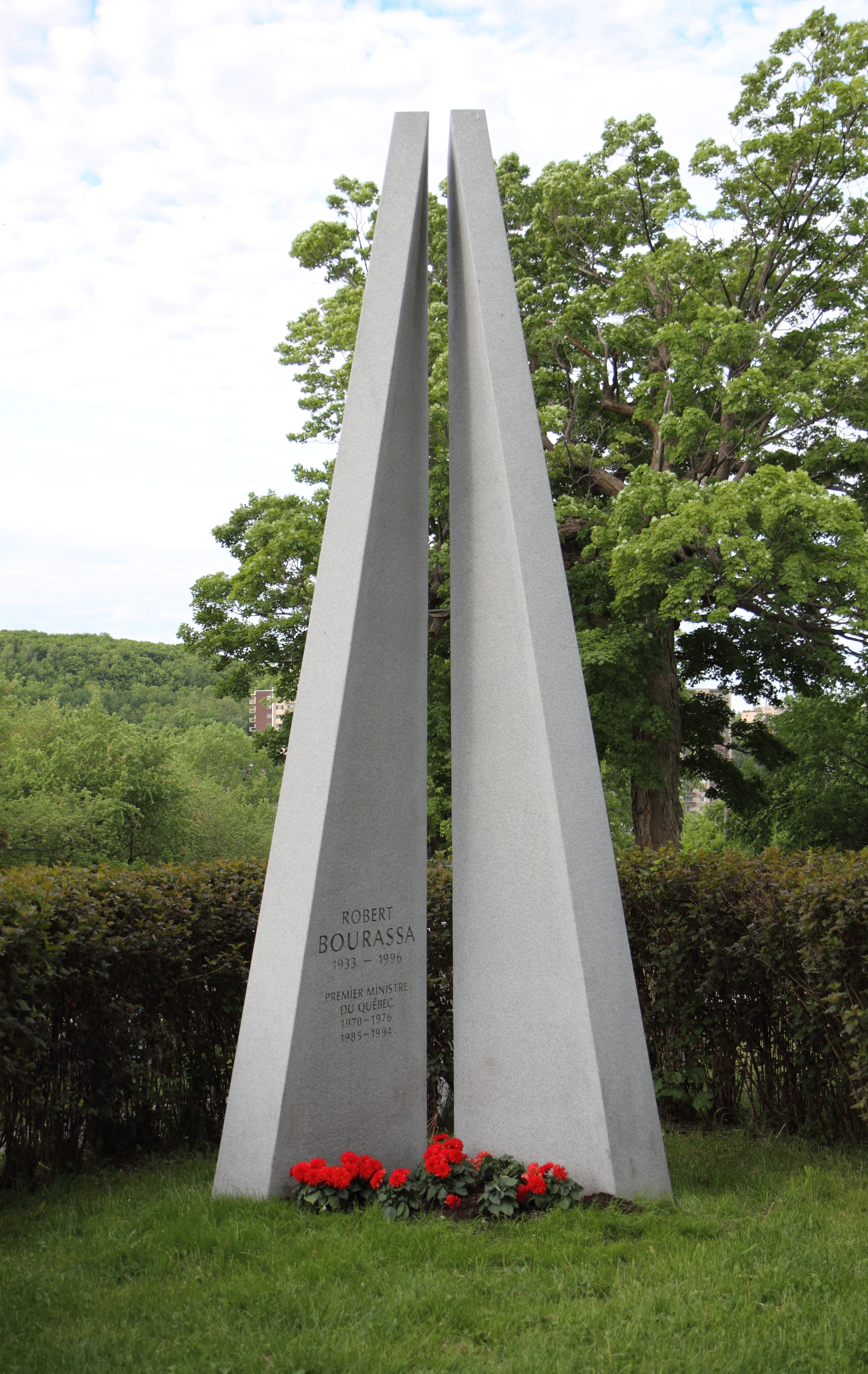
Bourassa's funeral monument in Notre Dame des Neiges Cemetery.

Bourassa retired from politics in 1994. He was replaced as Liberal leader and premier by Daniel Johnson Jr., who lost an election to the sovereigntist Parti Québécois after only nine months.

In 1996, Bourassa, who had spent much of his vacation time in hot climates, died in Montreal of melanoma at the age of 63, and was interred at the Notre Dame des Neiges Cemetery in Montreal.

== Quotations ==
- "No matter what anyone says and no matter what anyone does, Quebec is, today and forever, a distinct society, free and capable of assuming its destiny and development." (watch excerpts of original speech) (watch English dubbing) Meech Lake Accord.
- "There was no censorship of the press: in general, the War Measures Act could have been made even more radical."
- "A diplomat had been kidnapped, a cabinet minister had been kidnapped, they were under threats of murder. The police forces were rather tired. After a whole week, we were unable to find those that had effected the kidnappings."
- "We all have the means to be prosperous. We have to find the balance between our wealth and our needs."

== Homages ==
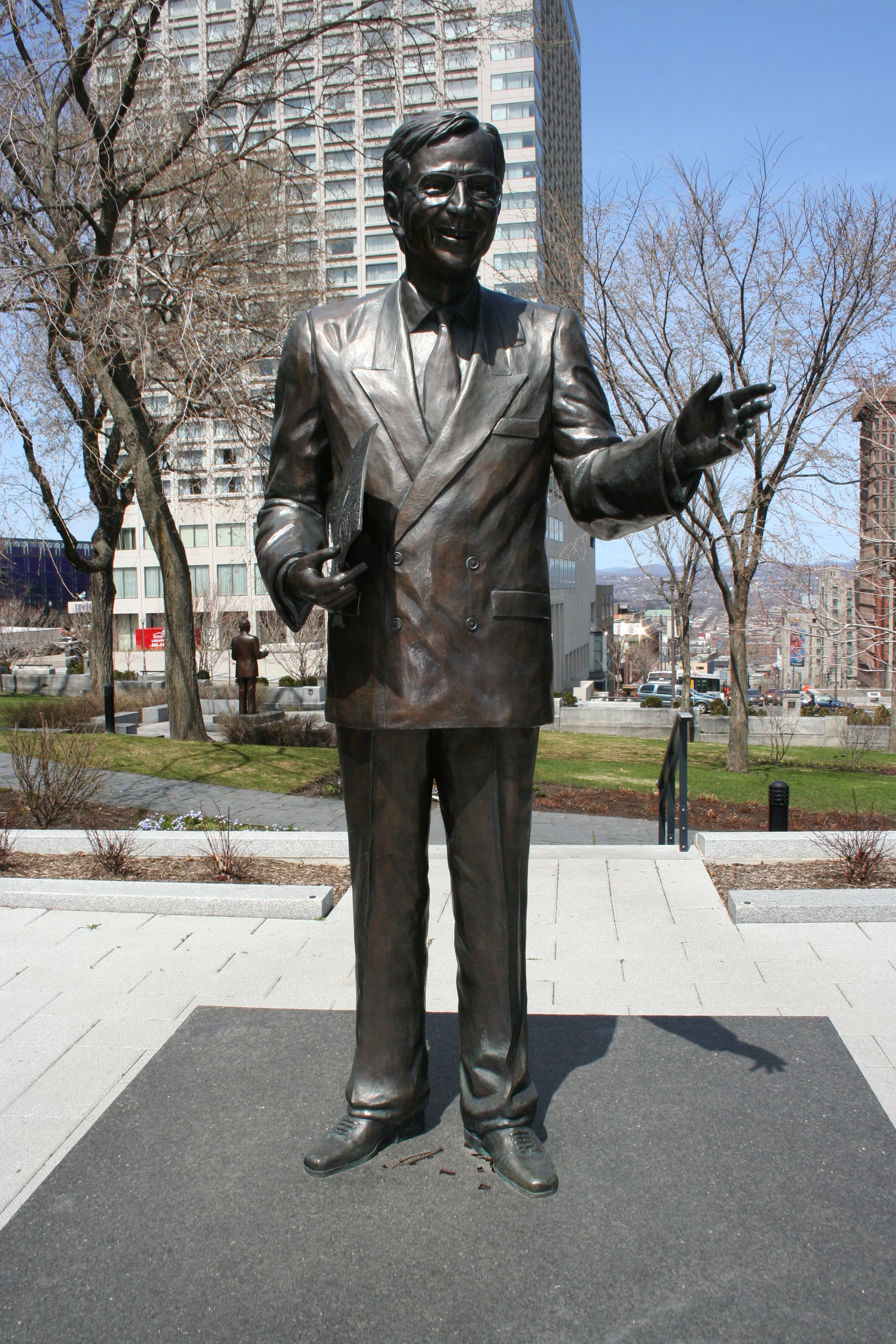
Statue of Bourassa on the grounds of the Quebec legislature

- A statue and a memorial of Bourassa was unveiled in front of the National Assembly on October 19, 2006.
- The City of Quebec renamed Highway Du Vallon, a major road in Quebec City, after Bourassa in late 2006.
- In Montreal, the portion of Rue University from Bonaventure Expressway to Sherbrooke Street was renamed Boulevard Robert-Bourassa.
- Canada's largest hydroelectric power station, Robert-Bourassa generating station, and its accompanying reservoir, Robert-Bourassa Reservoir were named after Bourassa in honour of his support of the James Bay Project.

In March 2015, a section of University Street (from Notre-Dame Street to Sherbrooke Street) in the downtown core of Montreal was renamed Robert-Bourassa Boulevard.

=== Park Avenue controversy ===
On October 18, 2006, Montreal Mayor Gérald Tremblay announced that Montreal's Park Avenue would be named after Bourassa. On November 28 the Montreal city council voted in favour (40–22) of renaming Park Avenue after Bourassa. If, as had been expected, Quebec's Toponymy Commission had approved the name change, all of Park Avenue and its continuation, Bleury, would have been renamed Robert Bourassa Avenue. This would have caused the newly named street to intersect René Lévesque Boulevard, named after a long time political rival to Bourassa. That boulevard, in turn, had been renamed from Dorchester Boulevard in 1987, in a decision that was also not without controversy. This decision by the City of Montreal without any consultation with the people of the city caused an immediate controversy, though many of those opposed to the change considered it a fait accompli. The proposal spawned substantial grass-roots opposition, both because of the lack of prior citizen input and because Park is itself a meaningful street name, associated with the city's Mount Royal park. In addition to protests and active opposition by a committee of Montreal residents and businesses opposed to the name change, an online petition garnered more than 18,000 virtual signatures against this renaming. On February 5, 2007, Montreal mayor Gérald Tremblay withdrew his proposal to rename Park Avenue. However, there is a Robert Bourassa Blvd., located in the Duvernay district of Laval, Quebec.

== Election results (partial) ==
1989 Quebec general election
Party	Candidate	Votes	%	±%
Liberal	Robert Bourassa	15,493	52.13	−30.57
Equality	Ciro Paul Scotti	7,101	23.89	–
Parti Québécois	Marie-France Charbonneau	5,559	18.70	–
Green	François Leduc	864	2.91	+1.47
New Democratic	Daniel Sabbah	248	0.83	−7.95
Communist	Thomas Hudson	158	0.53	–
Lemon	Marcel Provost	150	0.50	–
Workers	Jean Bilodeau	147	0.49	–
Total valid votes		29,720	98.41	–
Total rejected ballots		479	1.59	–
Turnout		30,199	74.12	+27.93
Electors on the lists		40,745	–	–

Quebec provincial by-election, January 20, 1986: Saint-Laurent
Party	Candidate	Votes	%	±%
Liberal	Robert Bourassa	16,020	82.70	+8.48
New Democratic	Sid Ingerman	1,701	8.78	+5.36
Parti indépendantiste	Gilles Rhéaume	778	4.02	–
Green	Jacques Plante	278	1.44	–
Humanist	Anne Farrell	202	1.04	–
Independent	Vincent Trudel	177	0.91	–
Independent	Martin Lavoie	70	0.36	–
United Social Credit	Léopold Milton	66	0.34	–
Non-affiliated	Patricia Métivier	49	0.25	–
Independent	Jay Lawrence Taylor	31	0.16	–
Total valid votes		19,372	98.65	–
Total rejected ballots		266	1.35	–
Turnout		19,638	46.19	−26.22
Electors on the lists		42,514	–	–
Source: Official Results, Le Directeur général des élections du Québec.

1976 Quebec general election: Mercier
Party	Candidate	Votes	%	±%
Parti Québécois	Gérald Godin	13,450	51.38	+9.57
Liberal	Robert Bourassa (incumbent)	9,714	37.11	−15.76
Union Nationale	Giuseppe Anzini	1,975	7.55	+5.97
Ralliement créditiste	Robert Roy	647	2.47	−0.64
New Democratic Party of Quebec - RMS coalition	Henri-François Gautrin	139	0.53	-
Communist	Guy Desautels	116	0.44	-
Workers	Gaston Morin	77	0.30	-
No designation	Louise Ouimet	58	0.22	-
Source: Official Results, Le Directeur général des élections du Québec.
Parti Québécois gain from Liberal		Swing		+12.67

1973 Quebec general election: Mercier
Party	Candidate	Votes	%	±%
Liberal	Robert Bourassa	13,757	52.87	+6.22
Parti Québécois	Louis O'Neill	10,877	41.81	+4.47
Ralliement créditiste	Georges Brault	809	3.11	+0.03
Union Nationale	Jean-Louis Décarie	411	1.58	−11.03
Marxist–Leninist	Robert-A. Cruise	70	0.27	-
Independent	Guy Robillard	53	0.20	-
No designation	Jeannette Pratte Walsh	23	0.09	-
No designation	Guy Robitaille	18	0.07	-
Source: Official Results, Le Directeur général des élections du Québec.

1970 Quebec general election: Mercier
Party	Candidate	Votes	%	±%
Liberal	Robert Bourassa	15,337	46.65	+2.38
Parti Québécois	Pierre Bourgault	12,276	37.34	-
Union Nationale	Conrad Touchette	4,145	12.61	-29.71
Ralliement créditiste	Clément Patry	1,011	3.08	-
Independent	Paul Ouellet	106	0.32	-
Total valid votes		32,875	100.0	
Source: Official Results, Le Directeur général des élections du Québec.

1966 Quebec general election: Mercier
Party	Candidate	Votes	%	±%
Liberal	Robert Bourassa	11,759	44.27	−9.80
Union Nationale	Conrad Touchette	11,241	42.32	−1.18
RIN	André Dagenais	3,115	11.73	-
Ralliement national	Roger Smith	335	1.26	-
Independent	Lucien-Jacques Cossette	112	0.42	-
Source: Official Results, Le Directeur général des élections du Québec.

== See also ==
- Robert Bourassa's speech on the end of the Meech Lake Accord
- Politics of Quebec
- List of Quebec Premiers
- Quebec general elections
- Timeline of Quebec history
- Prime Minister nicknaming in Quebec
- Boubou Macoutes
- Robert-Bourassa generating station and reservoir
