= Claude Ryan =

Canadian journalist and politician (1925-2004)

Claude Ryan CC GOQ
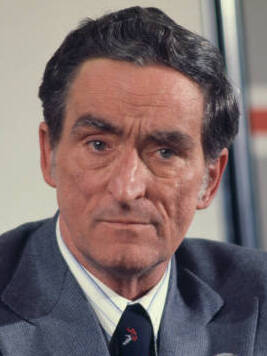
- Ryan in 1978

Member of the National Assembly of Quebec for Argenteuil
- In office 1979–1994
- Preceded by: Zoël Saindon
- Succeeded by: Régent L. Beaudet

Personal details
- Born: January 26, 1925 Montreal, Quebec, Canada
- Died: February 9, 2004 (aged 79) Montreal, Quebec, Canada
- Party: Quebec Liberal Party

Claude Ryan CC GOQ (January 26, 1925 – February 9, 2004) was a Canadian journalist and politician. He was the director of the newspaper Le Devoir from 1964 to 1978, leader of the Quebec Liberal Party from 1978 to 1982, National Assembly of Quebec member for Argenteuil from 1979 to 1994 and Minister of Education from 1985 to 1989.

== Early life ==
Ryan was born in Montreal, Quebec, the son of Blandine Dorion and Henri-Albert Ryan. Ryan's brother, Yves Ryan, was also politically active and served as mayor of Montreal North from 1963 to 2001.

== Journalism ==
From 1962 to 1978, Ryan was editorialist at Le Devoir, a French-language daily newspaper in Montreal, and he was the director of the newspaper from 1964 to 1978. During his tenure at the head of the editorial staff he became known for his probity and his mastery of contemporary political issues. His advice was sought by the provincial governments of Quebec and by opposition parties.

During the 1970 October Crisis Ryan was accused of participating in a plot to overthrow Robert Bourassa's recently elected government. Though the rumour was proven to be baseless, it served as a source of tension between Ryan and Prime Minister of Canada Pierre Elliott Trudeau, whom Ryan suspected of having spread the rumour in an attempt to damage him politically.

== Politics ==
Bourassa lost the 1976 election and his own MNA seat to the Parti Québécois under René Lévesque, in part due to the editorial position of Le Devoir under Ryan's stewardship. Subsequently, Ryan won the 1978 Quebec Liberal Party leadership election and served as party leader from 1978 to 1982, where he opposed Lévesque in two prominent campaigns (a referendum and an election).

Ryan led the victorious "No" side in the 1980 Quebec referendum on sovereignty which captured 60% of the vote. One particular turning point in the campaign was when Quebec PQ cabinet minister Lise Payette criticized Ryan's wife, Madeleine, as an "Yvette," a stay-at-home character in a popular Quebec storybook, then further suggesting that all females who were against sovereignty were acting as "Yvettes". This attack outraged many women voters in Quebec, especially since Madeleine Ryan was very active in political and social circles. Madeleine herself responded by organizing a brunch des Yvettes at the Château Frontenac on March 30. A week later, 14,000 women gathered at the Montreal Forum to denounce Payette's remarks. By nearly all accounts, many women voted "No" in the referendum out of anger at this insult.

Nonetheless, Pierre Trudeau was particularly critical of Ryan. Trudeau first criticized the performance of the Quebec Liberal Party, saying it was "drowning in a swamp of its own verbiage" during a televised National Assembly debate on sovereignty, in contrast to the Parti Québécois which had masterfully coordinated its speakers. Trudeau also said that Ryan's initial campaign efforts of talking to small groups of people was insufficient, which resulted in the federal cabinet minister Jean Chrétien being sent in to help the federalist side. That helped to perpetuate the strained relationship between Ryan and Trudeau.

Ryan then led the party into the 1981 provincial election. His Liberals finished just 3% behind the PQ in the popular vote, but the latter won twice as many seats; Quebec elections have typically seen large discrepancies between raw votes and seat counts. The loss was widely blamed on Ryan's campaign style, which was criticized for being old-fashioned and ill-suited for the television age. Notably, he refused to tailor sound bites for the evening news. Ryan was succeeded as MNA opposition leader and party chief by Bourassa, who was making a political comeback.

Ryan was the last non-interim Liberal leader who did not become premier until Dominique Anglade.

After the Liberals regained power under Bourassa in the 1985 election, Ryan became one of the most important members of the government and served as Minister of Education. He was also Minister of municipal affairs, public safety and minister responsible for the Charter of the French language. He also served in the cabinet led by Daniel Johnson.

Many in English Canada might remember Ryan for his work against the establishment of an independent Quebec. Those who followed his career, as a publisher and later as a politician, noted that he also opposed the existing federal status quo, which he considered as too centralized, despite statements to the contrary by Canadian Prime Minister Pierre Elliott Trudeau.

== Retirement ==
Ryan retired from politics in September 1994. In 1995, he was made a Companion of the Order of Canada. In 2002, he was awarded the Canadian version of the Queen Elizabeth II Golden Jubilee Medal.

Ryan died in Montreal, on February 9, 2004, at 4:20 a.m, of stomach cancer. In 2006, he was posthumously made a Grand Officer of the National Order of Quebec.

== Works ==
Besides his abundant editorial production in Le Devoir, Ryan also published:

- Les classes moyennes au Canada français, 1950
- L'éducation des adultes, réalité moderne, 1957
- Le contact dans l'apostolat, 1959
- Esprits durs, coeurs doux; la vie intellectuelle des militants chrétiens, 1959
- Les comités : esprit et méthodes, 1962
- Un type nouveau de laïc, 1966
- Le Devoir et la crise d'octobre 70, 1971
- Le Québec qui se fait, 1971
- Une société stable, 1978
- Regards sur le fédéralisme, 1995
- Mon testament spirituel, 2004

== Biographies ==
- Aurélien Leclerc, Claude Ryan, l'homme du devoir, Les éditions Quinze, Montréal, 1978, 224 pages, ISBN 0-88565-160-X
- Pierre Pagé, Claude Ryan, Un éditorialiste dans le débat social, Éditions Fides, Montréal, 2012, 544 pages, ISBN 978-2-76213-090-4

== See also ==
- List of Quebec leaders of the Opposition

Political offices
Preceded by Gérard D. Levesque	Leader of the Opposition in Quebec; 1979–1982	Succeeded by Gérard D. Levesque
Preceded by François Gendron	Minister of Education (Quebec); 1985–1990	Succeeded by Michel Pagé
