= Humanist Party of Ontario =

Unregistered political party in Ontario, Canada

The Humanist Party of Ontario (HPO) was an unregistered political party in Ontario, Canada. The party has fielded candidates in the 1994 Toronto municipal election, the 1997 Toronto municipal election, the 1999 provincial election, and the 2003 Toronto municipal election. The HPO was a member of the Humanist International.

== Ideology ==
The party's philosophy has its roots in the current of thought known as New or Universal Humanism, which has been developed since the 1960s by Mario Rodríguez Cobos. The HPO argues that, "by the very fact of being human, people should have their basic rights met".

== Manifesto ==
The Humanist Party issued a document in 1999 entitled "ORANGE BOOK: For an Ontario of Human Rights". The basic positions outlined in this book include:

- a constitutional guarantee of free and universal health care
- free and universal post-secondary education
- greatly reduced or free public transportation fees
- interest-free community banks to provide small-business loans
- co-management of businesses by labour and capital to stimulate the economy and reduce unemployment
- voter recall for negligent elected officials
- the establishment of a Ministry of Human Rights in Ontario.

In 2003, the Humanist Party began a campaign entitled "Humanize Toronto", calling for an end to homelessness and free Toronto Transit Commission access on smog days. It also released an alternative budget for the city. The party's candidates and electoral results from 2003 are listed here.

== Party candidates ==
=== Jorge Van Schouwen ===
Van Schouwen is a perennial candidate for office. He campaigned in the 1985 Quebec election in Mont-Royal as a candidate of the Parti humaniste du Québec, and received 54 votes, finishing eighth against Liberal candidate John Ciaccia. He was 31 years old at the time (Montreal Gazette, 25 November 1985). He received 99 votes in the 1999 Ontario election, finishing seventh against Liberal Gerard Kennedy in Parkdale—High Park.

His electoral record at the municipal level is as follows:

- 1997 Toronto election, Ward 19, 599 votes, eighth out of eight candidates. The winners for this two-member ward were David Miller and Chris Korwin-Kuczynski.
- 2000 Toronto election, Ward 14 Councillor, 416 votes, fourth out of four candidates. The winner was Chris Korwin-Kuczynski.

=== Roberto Verdecchia ===
Verdecchia is the co-founder of Annex newspaper. He supports lowering the voting age to sixteen, and entrenching the right to health care and free post-secondary education in the Canadian Constitution (Toronto Star, 30 May 1997). In 1996, he participated in a press conference with David Suzuki to draw attention to a boycott of the pulp and paper multinational firm Daishowa, and Daishowa's subsequent lawsuit against those behind the boycott. He has also produced "Making a Killing: Canada and the Arms Trade".

Verdecchia opposed plans for a bridge to the Toronto airport in the 2003 municipal election, and called for the establishment of "micro-banks" to provide interest-free loans in different neighbourhoods (Toronto Star, 6 November 2003). He was listed as 32 years old.

Electoral record
Election	Division	Party	Votes	%	Place	Winner
1997 federal	Trinity—Spadina	Ind.	129		10/10	Tony Ianno, Liberal
1997 municipal	Ward 24 Council	-	787	1.58	8/9	Olivia Chow and Kyle Rae
1999 provincial	Trinity—Spadina	Ind.	258	0.72	6/8	Rosario Marchese, New Democratic Party
2000 municipal	Ward 20 Council	-	1,126	9.59	3/3	Olivia Chow
2003 municipal	Ward 20 Council	-	484	4.77	4/5	Olivia Chow

The party's other candidate in the 1999 provincial election was Matthew Albrecht of Kitchener—Waterloo, who received 202 votes.

== See also ==
- List of Ontario political parties
