= Party for the Commonwealth of Canada (Quebec) candidates in the 1985 Quebec provincial election =

The Party for the Commonwealth of Canada (also known as the Party for the Republic of Canada) fielded twenty-eight candidates in the 1985 Quebec provincial election, none of whom were elected. This party was the Canadian branch of Lyndon LaRouche's movement. Information about the party candidates may be found on this page.

== Electoral divisions ==
=== Dorion: M. Luisa Grau ===
M. Luisa Grau received 56 votes (0.23%), finishing ninth against Liberal candidate Violette Trépanier.

=== Richelieu: Jean-Paul Belley ===
Jean-Paul Belley received 72 votes (0.23%), finishing sixth against Liberal candidate Albert Khelfa. He was sixty-eight years old in 1998.
