= Parti indépendantiste candidates in the 1985 Quebec provincial election =

The Parti indépendantiste fielded thirty-nine candidates in the 1985 Quebec provincial election, none of whom were elected. Information about these candidates may be found on this page.

== Candidates ==
=== Dorion: Normand Lacasse ===
Normand Lacasse received 268 votes (1.09%), finishing fifth against Liberal candidate Violette Trépanier.
