= Lise Payette =

Canadian politician and journalist (1931–2018)

Lise Payette OQ

Minister for Consumer Affairs, Cooperatives and Financial Institutions of Quebec
- In office November 26, 1976 – November 6, 1980
- Premier: René Levesque
- Preceded by: Lise Bacon
- Succeeded by: Pierre-Marc Johnson

Member of the National Assembly of Quebec for Dorion
- In office November 15, 1976 – April 13, 1981
- Preceded by: Alfred Bossé
- Succeeded by: Hugette Lachapelle

Personal details
- Born: Lise Ouimet; August 29, 1931 Verdun, Quebec, Canada
- Died: September 5, 2018 (aged 87) Montreal, Quebec, Canada
- Party: Parti Québécois
- Profession: Politician; journalist; businesswoman

Lise Payette OQ (née Ouimet; August 29, 1931 – September 5, 2018) was a Canadian politician, journalist, writer, and businesswoman. She was a Parti Québécois (PQ) minister under the leadership of Premier René Lévesque and National Assembly of Quebec member for the riding of Dorion. Originally a journalist, Payette became a television host in the 1960s. She left politics in 1981 and returned to a successful career in television production and writing.

== Life and career ==
Payette was born in Verdun, Quebec, the daughter of Fernand Ouimet, a bus driver, and Cécile Chartier. She was educated in Montreal, Quebec and married André Payette. She started a career in journalism at a radio station in Trois-Rivières in 1954. She held various jobs, including editor of the weekly Frontier Rouyn-Noranda, host of the show La Femme dans le monde (The Woman in the World) at CKRN and secretary and public relations officer for the United Steelworkers of America. While living in Paris she wrote for Petit Journal at the Patrie, for New Journal, and for Châtelaine magazine.

Payette returned to Montreal where she worked on the television program Interdit aux hommes ("prohibited to men") for Radio-Canada. From 1965 to 1972, Payette worked on a series of animated television programs for the French and English networks of the CBC. From 1972-75, Payette was the host of the TV series Appelez moi Lise" (Call Me Lise) and Lise Lib. Payette was appointed President of the Quebec National Holidays Committee in 1975.

Payette held several portfolios in the René Lévesque government. She was Minister for Consumer Affairs, Cooperatives and Financial Institutions, the Minister of State for the Status of Women, and the Minister of State for Social Development. In 1978, she spearheaded the initiative to change the slogan on Quebec license plates from "La Belle Province" ("The Beautiful Province") to "Je me souviens" ("I remember"), the motto carved under the provincial coat of arms above the entrance of the Quebec Parliament Building. Payette was also instrumental in the founding of the SAAQ automobile insurance company of Quebec, and the updating of the Civil Code of Quebec, allowing two surnames for children.

During the campaign for the 1980 Quebec referendum Payette denounced women supporters of the "No" side as Yvettes (the name of a docile young girl in an old school textbook). She went so far as calling Claude Ryan's wife, Madeleine Guay, an "Yvette". This backfired spectacularly as "the Yvettes", led by Guay, held a number of political rallies in response to her remarks. As Donald Brittain put it in his documentary series of René Lévesque and Pierre Elliott Trudeau, The Champions, "The old women were proud to be 'Yvettes'. The young women resented being 'Yvettes'. Payette had galvanized them into a fighting force". The first of those rallies happened on March 30 when a group of 1,700 women held the brunch des Yvettes at the Château Frontenac in Quebec City. A major rally occurred at the Montreal Forum on April 7 when 14,000 women denounced the minister's declarations about women and manifested their support for the "No" side. This was the first major rally for the "No" side in the campaign. This would be followed by many more rallies, particularly by women groups. Lise Payette would eventually apologize for her remarks.

In 1981, Payette left political life and did not stand for re-election. She became a writer for television with a series of successful soap operas. She founded the television production company Focus, with whom she first conceived the documentary series "Les quatre chevaliers de l'apocalypse" and "Femmes" and other fiction series, as a producer or author.

In 2004, Payette began writing columns for the Journal de Montreal. In 2007, she switched to Le Devoir. Payette continued to write for the paper until May 6, 2016, when she signed off with the phrase "Le Devoir ends the chronicle of Lise Payette," without further explanation, although she has since claimed that editor Brian Myles let her go without explanation from one day to the next.

In 2007, Payette wrote a song for Celine Dion entitled "Je cherche l'ombre" which is included on Dion's D'Elles album.

In 1994, Payette was recognized as "Woman of the Year" by Canadian Women in Communications. Payette was awarded the Florence Bird Award by the International Centre for Human Rights and Development in 1997. She was awarded the Grand Prize of the Academy of Canadian Cinema & Television, September 27, 1998.

In 2000, Payette was awarded the gold medal of the Mouvement national des Québécois, September 30, 2000. In 2001, she was made an Officer of the National Order of Quebec. In 2003, she received a lifetime achievement award from the Quebec Business Women's Network. In June 2009, she received an honorary doctorate from the Faculty of Humanities of the University of Quebec in Montreal. Payette was awarded the Pierre-Vadeboncœur Prize in 2012 and the Guy-Price Mauffette Prize in 2014. Payette died at her home on September 5, 2018.

Payette defended former PQ premier Pauline Marois's failed legislation known as the Charter of Quebec Values, which would prohibit public servants from wearing religious garb at work. The proposal, seen to target Muslim women, was widely criticized even by some Quebec nationalists.

Her daughter, Dominique Payette, ran unsuccessfully for the PQ in the riding of Charlesbourg in the 2014 election.

Payette in 2016 defended her friend, the deceased film director Claude Jutra, about allegations that he sexually abused children that were revealed after his death.

In 2017, Payette tried to dissuade Quebec media personality Léa Clermont-Dion from proceeding with a complaint of sexual assault alleged against journalist Michel Venne.

== Scenarios for TV ==
- 2001 - 2003 : Les Super Mamies
- 1995 - 1999 : Les Machos
- 1992 : Montréal ville ouverte
- 1991 - 1993 : Marilyn
- 1989 - 1991 : Un signe de feu
- 1986 - 1989 : Des dames de cœur
- 1982 - 1986 : La Bonne Aventure

== Filmography ==
- 1989 : Disparaître
- 2011 : Mémoires de députés, entrevue avec Lise Payette
- 2014 : Un peu plus haut, un peu plus loin

== Works ==
- 1971 : Recettes pour un homme libre, Éditions du Jour
- 1971 : Témoins de notre temps, Éditions du Jour
- 1975 : On l'appelle toujours... Lise, Éditions La Presse
- 1981 : Le Pouvoir ? Connais pas!, Québec Amérique (new edition 2010, Athéna Éditions)
- 1986 : La Bonne Aventure, Québec Amérique
- 1996 : Le Chemin de l'égalité, Éditions Fides
- Preface for L'enjeu, Ken Dryden, Éditions du Trécarré
- 1997 : Des femmes d'honneur : une vie privée 1931-1968, Éditions Libre Expression
- 1997 : Des femmes d'honneur : une vie publique 1968-1976, Éditions Libre Expression
- 1999 : Des femmes d'honneur : Une vie engagée, 1976-2000, Éditions Libre Expression
- 2012 : Le Mal du pays, Lux Éditeur

== See also ==
- Quebec nationalism
- Quebec sovereignty movement
