= Independent and non-affiliated candidates in the 1985 Quebec provincial election =

There were thirty-six independent and non-affiliated candidates in the 1985 Quebec provincial election, none of whom were elected. Information about these candidates may be found on this page.

== Candidates ==
=== Dorion: Mario Caluori ===
Mario Caluori was a member of the Parti des travailleurs du Québec (Workers Party) and attempted to run under its banner in the 1985 election. He was unable to do so, as the party was denied official ballot status for not fielding enough candidates. When Caluori attempted to file his nomination papers, he faced a two-hour delay from an officer who had run out of nomination forms. He was eventually able to enter the contest, but the delay prevented him from submitting the forms of another Workers Party candidate, for whom he was acting as an official agent. As the result, the Workers Party fell one candidate short of the required number for official status. The party protested the decision, citing an unduly legalistic interpretation of election regulations. He received 36 votes (0.15%), finishing last in a field of eleven candidates against Liberal Violette Trépanier.
