= G.-Raymond Laliberté =

G.-Raymond Laliberté (died June 8, 2008 in Québec) was a teacher, trade unionist, politician and professor in Quebec, Canada.

== Biography ==
G.-Raymond Laliberté studied pedagogy at Université de Montréal. He began a career as a schoolteacher in 1955 in Verdun.

In 1962, he started working as a pedagogical counsellor for the Corporation générale des instituteurs et institutrices catholiques de la province de Québec (CIC).

In the 1963 federal general election, Laliberté was the candidate for the New Democratic Party in the electoral district of Québec—Montmorency. He finished in fourth place, with 5.29% of the vote.

In 1965, Laliberté became the president of the Corporation des instituteurs et institutrices catholiques de la province de Québec (CIC), succeeding Léopold Garant. During his tenure, in 1967 the CIC was deconfessionalized and changed its name to Corporation des enseignants du Québec (CEQ). The CEQ also began another transformation by preparing a change of its status from a professional corporation to trade union organization (centrale syndicale). The CEQ voted to begin this process of transformation during its 1970 convention, when Laliberté's term ended. In 1970, Yvon Charbonneau succeeded Laliberté as president of the CEQ.

On February 21, 1971 Laliberté was elected president of the New Democratic Party of Quebec during its convention in Montreal. In the 1974 federal general election, he was the candidate for the New Democratic Party in the electoral district of Québec-Est. He finished in fourth place, with 7.82% of the vote Laliberté was president until 1974.

He began studies in political science at Université Laval, where he earned a master's degree and, in 1981, a Ph.D.

In 1973, he began an academic career in the faculty of sciences of education of Université Laval. and was a professor there until his retirement.

In the late 1970s and the 1980s, with other academics, he created the Mouvement socialiste, a small political party of which he was the vice-president.
