= Parti du socialisme chrétien candidates in the 1985 Quebec provincial election =

The Parti du socialisme chrétien (Christian Socialist Party) fielded 103 candidates in the 1985 Quebec provincial election, none of whom were elected. Information about these candidates may be found on this page.

== Electoral divisions ==
=== Brome—Missisquoi: André Paré ===
André Paré received 136 votes (0.57%), finishing fourth against Liberal Party incumbent Pierre Paradis.

=== Dorion: André St-Arnaud ===
André St-Arnaud received 55 votes (0.22%), finishing tenth against Liberal Party candidate Violette Trépanier.

=== Nicolet: Hélène Couture ===
Hélène Couture received 139 votes (0.52%), finishing fourth against Liberal Party candidate Maurice Richard.

=== Richelieu: Diane Dufour ===
Diane Dufour received 105 votes (0.34%), finishing fifth against Liberal Party candidate Albert Khelfa.
