= 1985 Quebec school board elections =

Local elections in Canadian province of Quebec

The Canadian province of Quebec held school board elections on December 9, 1985, to elect new trustees to Catholic and Protestant school boards. Many candidates were elected without opposition, and turnout was generally low.

Outside of the island of Montreal, one-third of all trustees were elected each year on a rotating basis.

== South Shore ==
Turnout on the south shore of Montreal was especially low, with estimates ranging from between three and ten per cent.

=== Commission scolaire Jacques-Cartier ===
Trustee, Ward Three
Candidate	Total votes	% of total votes
(incumbent)Annette Gagne	160	98.16
Joseph Ranger	3	1.84
Total valid votes	163	100.00

== Notes ==
- Source: Sandy Senyk, "School board elections drew low voter turnout," Montreal Gazette, 11 December 1985, A5.
