= Gilles Rhéaume =

Canadian politician (1951–2015)

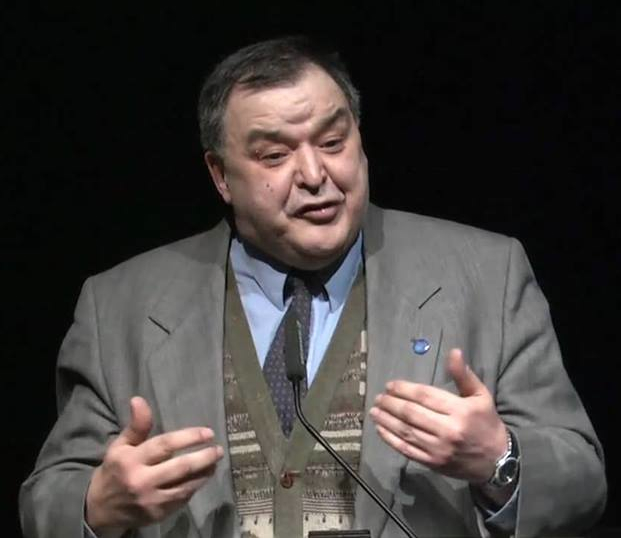
Gilles Rhéaume

Gilles Rhéaume (25 October 1951 – 8 February 2015) was the former Société Saint-Jean-Baptiste de Montréal president from 1981 to 1985.

Rhéaume was leader of the Parti indépendantiste of Quebec from 1987 to its dissolution in 1990. He was later president of the Mouvement souverainiste du Québec.

He often denounced the use of English. He once organized a protest outside the Jewish General Hospital in Montreal after Radio-Canada journalist Normand Lester reported that a nurse asked Lester to speak English.

In the 1990s he worked for a group supporting HIV-AIDS patients. He died at the Pierre-Boucher hospital in Longueuil in 2015, aged 63.
