= Mouvement socialiste (Canada) =

Canadian political party

The Mouvement socialiste was a left-wing political party in the Canadian province of Quebec. Formed in 1981, it ran candidates in the 1985 and 1989 provincial elections.

== Origins ==
The Mouvement socialiste emerged from discussions among six prominent Quebec academics and unionists: Yvon Charbonneau, Marcel Pepin, Raymond Laliberté, Albert Dubuc, Jacques Dofny, and Lucie Dagenais. After meeting for a year, they launched the Comité des Cent in 1979. This group, described as an alliance of "trade unionists and reformist academics," produced the new party's manifesto in 1981.

The Mouvement socialiste was committed to feminism and ecology and supported Quebec sovereignty as a means of promoting socialism. Because of its opposition to Maoist entrist tactics, its members chose not to work inside social movements.

Yvon Charbonneau resigned from the party in 1982, after being elected as the leader of the Quebec teachers' union. He argued that union leadership was incompatible with membership in a political party. In a 1983 interview, however, he said that the Mouvement socialiste still represented his beliefs. In later years, he would shift toward the political centre.

Members of the Trotskyist group Combat socialiste were briefly affiliated with the Mouvement socialiste in the early 1980s. They left in 1983 to form the Gauche Socialiste group.

In 1984, Mouvement socialist president Marcel Pépin joined a coalition of Quebec nationalists in a bid to renew the sovereigntist movement. This followed Quebec Premier René Lévesque decision that the Parti Québécois would downplay Quebec independence.

== Electoral politics ==
The Mouvement socialiste was not initially committed to running candidates for public office, but in 1985 it announced that it would run candidates in the upcoming provincial election to provide voters with a "socialist alternative." Party leader Roger Deslauriers indicated that the Mouvement socialiste was aiming for six per cent of the popular vote. The new party was opposed by the New Democratic Party of Quebec (NDP), a more established democratic socialist party that was still in this period aligned with the New Democratic Party of Canada. Provincial NDP leader Jean-Paul Harney dismissed the Mouvement's electoral prospects, saying that it "barely exist[ed] as an organization."

The Mouvement socialiste ultimately ran ten candidates and received 1,809 votes, about 0.05% of the provincial total. Several supporters of its involvement in electoral politics later joined the NDP.

The Mouvement socialiste fielded ten candidates again in the 1989 provincial election, but was unable to move beyond marginal status. During the election, party members took part in negotiations with the New Democratic Party of Quebec, the Green Party of Quebec, the Workers Party and the Communist Party in a bid to create a united left party. By 1991, the Mouvement had disappeared.
