= Commission scolaire Jacques-Cartier =

The Commission scolaire Jacques-Cartier is a former school board in the Canadian province of Quebec. It was merged into the Commission scolaire Marie-Victorin in 1998, with the support of local parents.
