= Pierre Marc Johnson =

Premier of Quebec in 1985

Pierre Marc Johnson GOQ
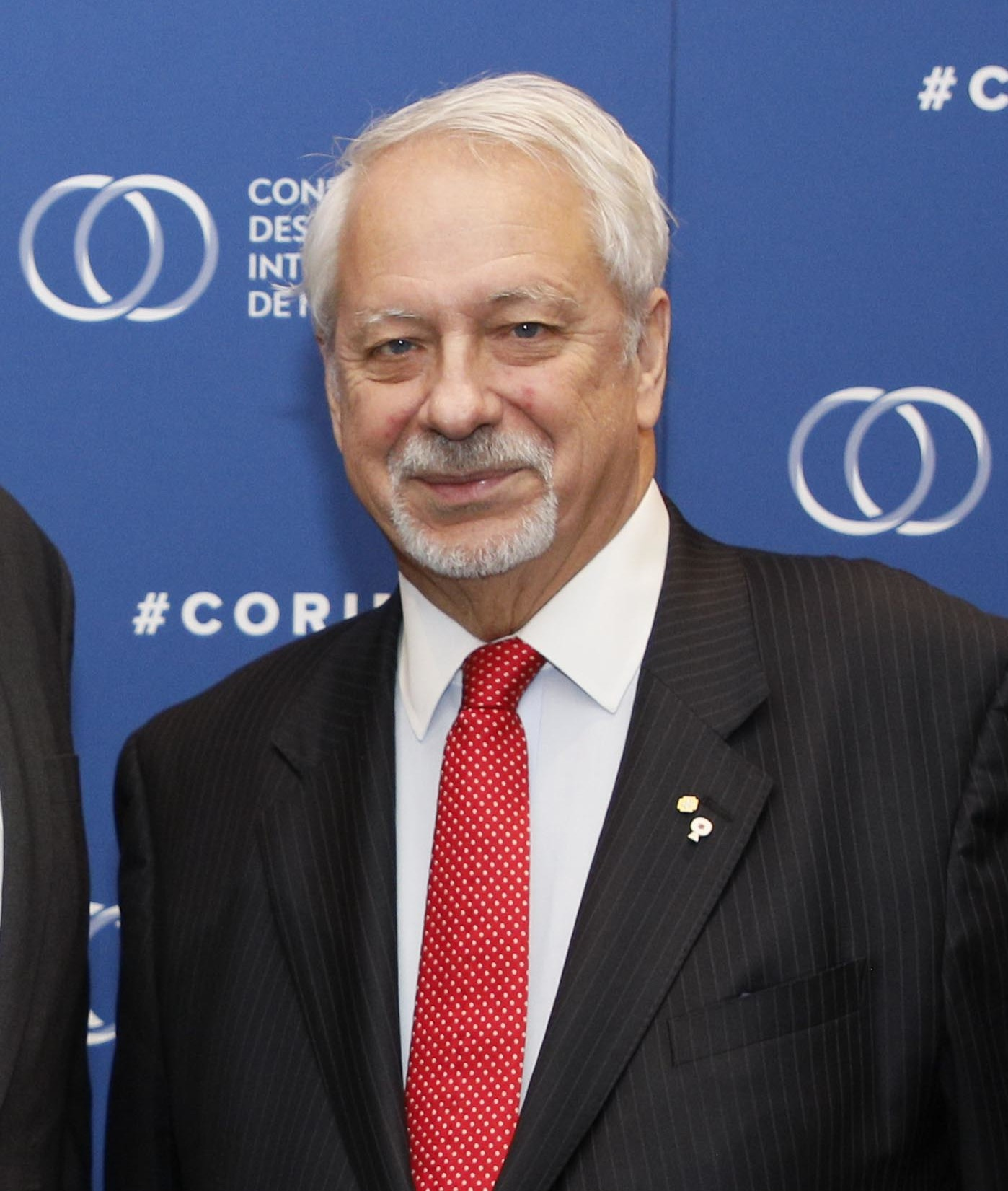
- Johnson in 2019

24th Premier of Quebec
- In office October 3, 1985 – December 12, 1985
- Monarch: Elizabeth II
- Lieutenant Governor: Gilles Lamontagne
- Deputy: Marc-André Bédard
- Preceded by: René Lévesque
- Succeeded by: Robert Bourassa

Leader of the Opposition (Quebec)
- In office December 12, 1985 – November 10, 1987
- Preceded by: Robert Bourassa
- Succeeded by: Guy Chevrette

MNA for Anjou
- In office November 15, 1976 – November 10, 1987
- Preceded by: Yves Tardif
- Succeeded by: René Serge Larouche

Personal details
- Born: July 5, 1946 (age 80) Montreal, Quebec, Canada
- Party: Parti Québécois
- Parent: Daniel Johnson Sr.
- Relatives: Daniel Johnson Jr. (brother)
- Profession: Lawyer; physician

Pierre Marc Johnson GOQ (born July 5, 1946) is a Canadian lawyer, physician and politician. He was the 24th premier of Quebec from October 3 to December 12, 1985, making him the province's shortest-serving premier, and the first Baby Boomer to hold the office.

== Early life and family ==
Born in Montreal, Quebec, on July 5, 1946, Johnson is of French-Canadian and Irish descent and is a Roman Catholic. He received a degree in law from the Université de Montréal in 1970 and a medical degree from the Université de Sherbrooke in 1976.

He is the son of Reine Gagné and Daniel Johnson Sr., who served as Premier of Quebec from 1966 to 1968. His brother, Daniel Johnson Jr., served as Premier for nine months in 1994.

Each of the Johnsons led different political parties:

- Daniel Sr. was leader of the conservative Union Nationale party, and had an ambiguous position on the question of independence for Quebec;
- Pierre Marc joined the sovereigntist PQ in the aftermath of the 1970 October Crisis;
- Daniel Jr. backed the federalist Liberals by 1977.

== Political career ==
In 1976, Pierre Marc Johnson successfully ran as the Parti Québécois candidate for the district of Anjou. Premier René Lévesque appointed him to the cabinet in 1977 and he was re-elected in 1981.

Johnson served as Minister of Labour from 1977 to 1980, Minister to Consumers, Cooperatives and Financial Institutions from 1980 to 1981, Minister of Social Affairs from 1981 to 1984 and Attorney General from 1984 to 1985.

=== Premier of Quebec ===
In the leadership election of 1985, Johnson was chosen to succeed PQ founder René Lévesque as leader of the party and consequently as Premier of Quebec.

Johnson was generally considered to be soft on the sovereignty of Quebec issue. He put independence on the back burner, as Lévesque had begun to do under the "beau risque" approach and eventually made that approach the official constitutional policy of his party, calling it "National Affirmation".

Johnson was described as somewhat on the right of the party.

=== Leader of the Official Opposition ===
He was re-elected to the legislature in 1985, but his party was defeated by the Liberals, led by Robert Bourassa.

His leadership was contested by more radical PQ supporters, such as Gérald Godin. On November 10, 1987, he resigned as head of the party, Leader of the Opposition and member of the National Assembly. He was succeeded as head of the PQ by interim leader Guy Chevrette and later Jacques Parizeau, who again made independence a primary goal.

Johnson lost in the December 1985 election after becoming leader in October. Johnson became as opposition leader and stepped down as party leader in 1987 (with next election in 1989).

== After politics ==
Both a lawyer and a physician, he is a former Professor of Law at McGill University in Montreal and was Counsel at the firm of Heenan Blaikie LLP in Montreal, Quebec until 2014. He is now Counsel at the firm of Lavery, also in Montreal. In 2001 he was appointed as chief advisor and negotiator of the Quebec government in the Softwood Lumber dispute between Canada and the United States by then Premier Bernard Landry.

In October 2006, he was chosen by the Charest government to preside over a public inquiry into the collapse of a viaduct over Autoroute 19 in Laval, Quebec, leaving five dead and six injured. The choice of Johnson was criticized by both leaders in opposition André Boisclair (PQ) and Mario Dumont (Action démocratique du Québec) because of the possibility of conflict of interest. As president, he was invested with the responsibility of investigating government administration while being a former Minister of the Quebec Government, a former Premier of Quebec, and, until shortly after this nomination, member of the board of directors of Ciment Saint-Laurent, a cement company.

Johnson was appointed by the minority Conservative government to the Canadian delegation at the United Nations' Bali Conference on climate change.

Johnson was Quebec's negotiator for CETA (Canada-European-union Trade Agreement).

Johnson refused to take a stance regarding the 1995 Quebec referendum on independence.

In December 2005 he made waves in sovereigntist circles by supporting Liberal candidate and close, longtime friend Raymond Bachand in a provincial by-election in the Outremont riding.

== Select publications ==
- Johnson, Pierre Marc & Karel Mayrand. "Beyond Trade: Broadening the Globalization Governance Agenda." Guiding Global Order: G8 Governance in the Twenty First Century. (Ashgate: Aldershot, 2000). Link to item
- Johnson, Pierre Marc & Andre Beaulieu. "The Environment and NAFTA: Understanding and Implementing the New Continental Law." (Island Press, 1996)

== See also ==
- Politics of Quebec
- List of Quebec general elections
- Timeline of Quebec history

== Footnotes ==
National Assembly of Quebec
Preceded by Yves Tardif (Liberal)	MNA, District of Anjou; 1976–1987	Succeeded by René Serge Larouche (Liberal)
Party political offices
Preceded by René Lévesque	Leader of the Parti Québécois; 1985–1987	Succeeded by Guy Chevrette; Interim
Political offices
Preceded by René Lévesque (Parti Québécois)	Premier of Quebec; 1985	Succeeded by Robert Bourassa (Liberal)
Preceded by Robert Bourassa (Liberal)	Leader of the Opposition in Quebec; 1985–1987	Succeeded by Guy Chevrette (Parti Québécois)
