= Progressive Conservative Party of Quebec =

Progressive Conservative Party of Quebec Parti progressiste conservateur du Québec
- Founder: Denis Carignan
- Founded: 1982
- Dissolved: 1989
- Split from: Union Nationale
- Ideology: Conservatism; Liberal conservatism Economic liberalism Progressive conservatism
- Political position: Centre-right
- Colours: Blue

The Progressive Conservative Party of Quebec (French: Parti progressiste conservateur du Québec) was formed in 1982 with Denis Carignan as leader but was rebuffed by federal Progressive Conservative leader Joe Clark who told them to keep their distance.

The party was dormant until January 1985 when Carignan stepped aside to allow André Asselin, a lawyer and the mayor of the small town of Ste-Émilie-de-l'Énergie, and president of the Quebec Union of Regional Municipal Councils, to become the party leader. However, Prime Minister Brian Mulroney told the press following a meeting with the Quebec Liberal Party leader Robert Bourassa that he did not support the creation of a provincial Progressive Conservative Party. By the 1980s, the conservative Union Nationale was no longer a contender for office and in terminal decline, but it rebuffed an offer by Asselin for a merger with his Progressive Conservative Party.

After making an impression in a June 1985 by-election in which Asselin placed second with 30% of the vote in L'Assomption, the party nominated 48 candidates for the December 1985 provincial election but failed to make a major impact, receiving 1.03% popular vote. Asselin blamed the party's poor showing on what he called deliberate sabotage by federal officials who discouraged Progressive Conservative Party of Canada from giving money or otherwise being identified with the provincial group.

Asselin resigned as party leader in 1989 leaving Robert Coppenrath to lead the party into the 1989 election where it ran 12 candidates and received 0.14% of the vote. Hundreds of thousands of dollars in debt, the party disbanded shortly afterward.

== Leaders ==
- Denis Carignan 1982–1985
- André Asselin 1985–1989
- Robert Coppenrath 1989

== Election results ==
General election	# of candidates	# of seats won	% of popular vote
1985	48	0	1.03%
1989	12	0	0.14%

== See also ==
- Conservative Party of Quebec (historical)
- Conservative Party of Quebec (2009–present)
