= Parti indépendantiste (1985) =

The Parti indépendantiste (French pronunciation: [paʁti ɛ̃depɑ̃dɑ̃tist]; English: Independentist Party) was a provincial party which advocated Quebec sovereignty in Québec, Canada in the second half of the 1980s.

== Denis Monière ==
Founded by Denis Monière in 1985, the party was established to promote the separation of Québec from Canada. It attracted a number of purs et durs supporters of the Parti Québécois (PQ), who believed the party was not taking a strong enough position in promoting the cause of Québec independence.

Monière had previously been interim leader of the Parti nationaliste du Québec, a federal political party, following the resignation of the party’s founder. Monière was defeated in the 1984 Canadian election that brought Brian Mulroney to power.

Under Monière's leadership, the Parti indépendantiste's influence failed to gain momentum. The party received less than one percent of the vote in the 1985 election.

== Gilles Rhéaume ==
Gilles Rhéaume became party leader in 1987. During his tenure, the party became radicalized and divided over strategy. Jacques Parizeau succeeded Pierre-Marc Johnson as leader of the PQ on March 18, 1988, and took a stronger stance on sovereignty. Many Parti indépendantiste supporters returned to the PQ fold.

Rhéaume resigned on January 8, 1990, and the Parti indépendantiste lost its registration on June 15 of the same year.

== Leaders of the Parti indépendantiste ==
- Denis Monière (1985–1987)
- Gilles Rhéaume (1987–1990)

== Election results ==
General election	# of candidates	# of elected candidates	% of popular vote
1985	39	0	0.45%
1989	12	0	0.14%

== See also ==
- Politics of Quebec
- List of Quebec general elections
- List of Quebec premiers
- List of Quebec leaders of the Opposition
- National Assembly of Quebec
- Timeline of Quebec history
- Political parties in Quebec
- Secessionist movements of Canada
