= Parti du socialisme chrétien =

- English name: Christian Socialist Party
- Abbreviation: PSC
- Founder: Jacques Paquette
- Dissolved: c. 1986
- Headquarters: Quebec, Canada

The Parti du socialisme chrétien (Note: French pronunciation: [paʁti dy sɔsjalism kʁetjɛ̃].) (PSC; known in English as the Christian Socialist Party) was a fringe political party in the Canadian province of Quebec. It fielded 103 candidates in the 1985 Quebec general election.

Despite its name, the PSC had no connection with Canada's social democratic political tradition. It was established by Jacques Paquette, a former heroin addict who operated drug treatment centres throughout Quebec in the 1980s. The party was primarily focused on drug issues, supporting both the legalization of cannabis and the introduction of the death penalty for traffickers in hard drugs.

On one occasion, Paquette said that he would establish a leftist dictatorship in a "free Quebec" to remove heroin dealers from the province. He also promoted the use of handguns by citizen vigilantes to fight organized crime.

Paquette ran in the 1985 election in Hull under the name "Jacob Easter", which was intended as a humorous translation of his real name. He placed last in a field of six candidates.

Paquette was killed in a car crash near Riviere-du-Loup, Quebec, on August 28, 1986. The party appears to have become inactive after his death.
