= Parti humaniste du Québec =

Parti humaniste du Québec (English: Humanist Party of Quebec) was a provincial political party in Canadian province of Quebec. It contested the 1985 provincial election and also fielded candidates in a number of by-elections before folding. The party's leader was Colette Renaud.

== History ==
=== 1980s ===
The Quebec Humanist Party was founded in February 1985 and was affiliated with the international Humanist Party organization. It claimed between 100 and 150 active members by June 1985. The party's platform included support for "non-discrimination, active non-violence, co-operativism, the principle of options and non-monopoly and the human being as a central value."

The first election that the Humanist Party contested was a by-election in Bourget in June 1985. Renaud, running as the party's standard-bearer, received 485 votes (3.18%) for a fourth-place finish.

The Humanist Party ran seventeen candidates in the 1985 election. During the campaign, Renaud said that her party would return politics to ordinary people; she described the Humanist Party as representing a "new left: non-violent, democratic, pluralist, co-operative and libertarian." The Montreal Gazette noted that half of the party's Montreal-area candidates were women.

The HP wanted to run candidates in the 1986 elections for Mayor of Montreal, but was refused on the grounds they were a provincial party. Instead, they created the Orange Party with Marie-Claire Desroches as party leader. Desroches dissolved the party within seven days of its creation and ran as an "independent Humanist."

None of the party's candidates were elected. The party also contested by-elections in 1986 and 1987 before disappearing.

== 1990s ==
There was an attempt to re-establish the Humanist Party in Montreal in 1997 in order to field candidates at the federal level for the 1997 Canadian election. Ann Farrell was the party's spokesperson in this period. (Farrell later ran as an independent in the 1998 Quebec provincial election, possibly as an unofficial Humanist Party candidate.)

== See also ==
- Humanist Party of Ontario
