= Parti crédit social uni =

Former provincial political party in Quebec, Canada

The Parti crédit social uni (French pronunciation: [paʁti kʁedi sɔsjal yni], PCSU; English: United Social Credit Party) was a provincial political party in the Canadian province of Quebec. It existed on two occasions, from 1969 to around 1971 and from 1979 to 1994. The party's leader in both periods was Jean-Paul Poulin. The PCSU was not formally aligned with the Social Credit Party of Canada.

== First period, 1969–71 ==
The Parti crédit social uni emerged via a split in the Quebec social credit movement. Its origins appear to be in the Ralliement national (RN), a social credit and Quebec nationalist party that contested the 1966 provincial election without the approval of Ralliement des créditistes leader Réal Caouette. The RN merged into the Parti Québécois in 1968; the group that became the PCSU appears not to have approved of this decision.

Caouette's party fielded candidates at the provincial level for the first time in 1969. A group of dissidents opposed this decision and founded the PCSU as a rival group, citing a lack of confidence in Caouette's leadership. Poulin was chosen as the PCSU's leader; he had previously been a RN candidate in the 1966 provincial election and a Créditiste candidate in the 1968 Canadian federal election. During this time, he indicated his support for a "strong Quebec in a united Canada."

The PCSU ran candidates in three 1969 by-elections, in the 1970 provincial elections, and in further by-elections in 1971. None were elected. The party was not registered with the provincial government, and its candidates appeared on the ballot without affiliation.

The party seems to have disappeared after 1971. Poulin joined the re-united Social Credit Party of Canada under Caouette's leadership and was a party candidate in the 1974 federal election.

== Second period, 1979–1994 ==
The provincial Ralliement créditiste du Québec, which was aligned with the federal party, dissolved itself in 1978. The PCSU was subsequently re-established, again under Poulin's leadership; it was accredited as a provincial political party for the first time on September 13, 1979. The PCSU nominated candidates in the 1981 election, 1985 election, and 1989 election, each time winning less than 0.1% of the popular vote. The last time it fielded a candidate was in a by-election in Anjou held on January 20, 1992. The party was deregistered on August 27, 1994, by the Chief Electoral Officer of Quebec.

During the 1981 provincial election, the Montreal Gazette described the PCSU as a "hard core" Créditiste faction and identified Poulin as a follower of Major C.H. Douglas's economic theories. When interviewed by the Gazette, Poulin held up a copy of his party's manifesto and said, "This was written in 1966 and I haven't had to change a word."
