= Party for the Commonwealth of Canada (Quebec) =

Quebec branch of Larouche movement political party

The Parti pour la république du Canada (Québec) (in English: Party for the Commonwealth of Canada (Quebec)) was the Quebec branch of the Party for the Commonwealth of Canada, a Canadian political party formed by supporters of U.S. politician Lyndon LaRouche. Founded in 1983, it contested seats in the 1985, 1989 and 1994 Quebec general elections under various names: Parti républicain du Québec (Republican Party of Quebec; not to be mistaken with the Parti républicain du Québec, a sovereigntist party founded by Marcel Chaput in 1962), Parti pour le Commonwealth du Canada (Québec) and Parti pour la république du Canada (Québec). It also contested by-elections prior to the 1985 general election.

The PRC(Q) was disbanded after the 1994 general election. It now operates as the Committee for the Republic of Canada.

== Election results ==
General election	# of candidates	# of seats won	% of popular vote
1985 (PCC(Q))	28	0	0.07%
1989 (PRC(Q))	11	0	0.05%
1994 (PRC(Q))	18	0	0.06%

== See also ==
- Politics of Quebec
- List of Quebec general elections
- List of Quebec premiers
- List of Quebec leaders of the Opposition
- National Assembly of Quebec
- Timeline of Quebec history
- Political parties in Quebec
- North American Labour Party
