= Parti des travailleurs du Québec =

The Parti des travailleurs du Québec (PTQ; English: Workers Party of Quebec) was a political party in the Canadian province of Quebec. It first issued a manifesto in 1976 and fielded candidates in provincial elections until the 1990s, never rising above fringe status. Gérard Lachance was party leader for at least part, and possibly all, of its existence.

In a 1981 interview, party spokesperson Maurice Gohier indicated that the PTQ was not communist but promoted both independence and socialism for Quebec. Its platform called for workers to be given a greater influence in the governing of society.

The PTQ did not appear on the ballot in the 1985 provincial election due to registration difficulties, although some party members ran as non-affiliated candidates. The party's central offices were burgled in the 1989 provincial election, and a party official indicated that the names and addresses of party members were stolen.
