= 1985 Quebec general election =

Canadian provincial election

- December 2, 1985

122 seats in the 33rd National Assembly of Quebec 62 seats were needed for a majority
- Turnout: 75.69% (▼6.83%)
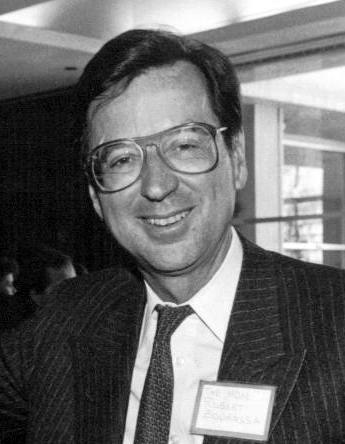

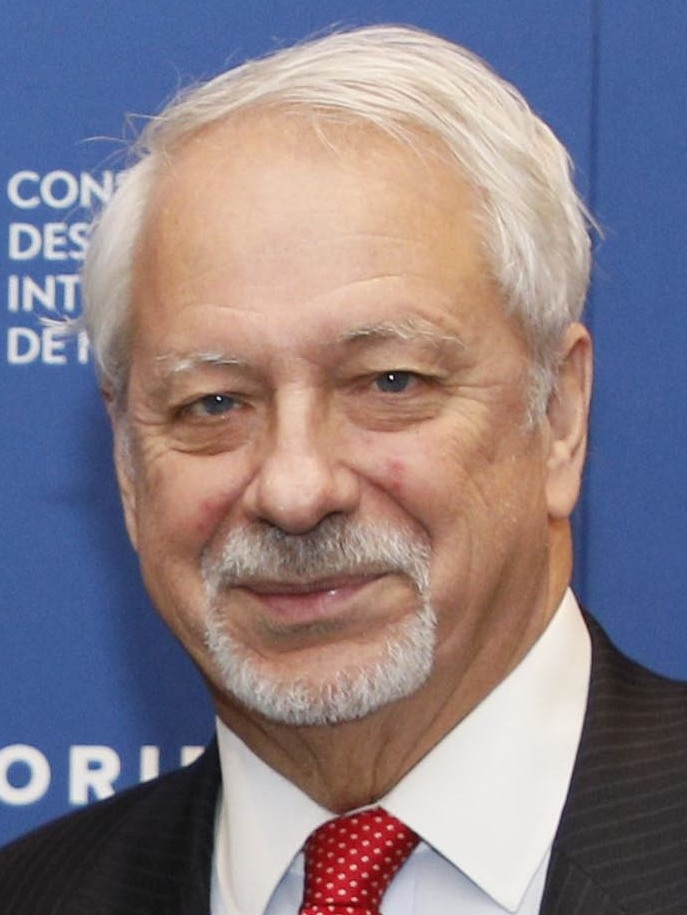
| | First party | Second party |
|---|---|---|
| Leader | Robert Bourassa | Pierre-Marc Johnson |
| Party | Liberal | Parti Québécois |
| Leader since | October 15, 1983 | September 29, 1985 |
| Leader's seat | Bertrand (lost re-election) | Anjou |
| Last election | 42 seats, 46.07% | 80 seats, 49.26% |
| Seats won | 99 | 23 |
| Seat change | ▲57 | ▼57 |
| Popular vote | 1,910,307 | 1,320,008 |
| Percentage | 55.99% | 38.69% |
| Swing | ▲9.92% | ▼10.57% |
- Popular vote by riding. As this is an FPTP election, seat totals are not determined by popular vote, but instead via results by each riding. Click the map for more details.
Premier before election
Pierre-Marc Johnson
Parti Québécois
Premier after election
Robert Bourassa
Liberal

The 1985 Quebec general election was held on December 2, 1985, to elect members of the National Assembly of the Province of Quebec, Canada. The Quebec Liberal Party, led by former premier Robert Bourassa, defeated the incumbent Parti Québécois, led by Premier Pierre-Marc Johnson.

This election marked the comeback of Robert Bourassa, whose political career had been thought to be over after losing the 1976 general election and resigning as Liberal leader. However, Bourassa personally failed to win his own seat in the Bertrand electoral district, and had to run in a by-election one month later in the safe Saint-Laurent electoral district. The 1985 Quebec general election result produced by far the largest majority of any Canadian legislative election (in terms of the number of seats) by a winning party whose leader failed to win his own seat. It was also the only modern election in Quebec history where the leader of the winning party lost their seat.

Johnson, son of former Union Nationale premier Daniel Johnson Sr. was unable to revive the PQ's fortune after he succeeded René Lévesque as party leader and premier. Pierre-Marc's brother, Daniel Johnson Jr., later became leader of the Liberal Party and briefly served as premier.

This election was the last contested by the Union Nationale. It only ran candidates in 19 ridings, none of whom came close to being elected. The party would be wound up by election authorities in 1989. It is also the last Quebec general election to date where the largest party won a majority government while also getting over 50% of the popular vote.

== Results ==
Elections to the National Assembly of Quebec (1985)
| Political party | Party leader | MNAs | | | | Votes | | | |
| Political party | Party leader | Candidates | 1981 | 1985 | ± | # | ± | % | ± (pp) |
|---|---|---|---|---|---|---|---|---|---|
| Liberal | Robert Bourassa | 122 | 42 | 99 | 57▲ | 1,910,307 | 251,554▲ | 55.99% | 9.91▲ |
| Parti Québécois | Pierre-Marc Johnson | 122 | 80 | 23 | 57▼ | 1,320,008 | 453,229▼ | 38.69% | 10.57▼ |
| New Democratic | Jean-Paul Harney | 90 | – | – | – | 82,588 | 82,588▲ | 2.42% | New |
| Progressive Conservative | André Asselin | 48 | – | – | – | 35,210 | 35,210▲ | 1.03% | New |
| Parti indépendantiste | Denis Monière | 39 | – | – | – | 15,423 | 15,423▲ | 0.45% | New |
| Christian Socialist | Jacques Paquette | 103 | – | – | – | 11,712 | 11,712▲ | 0.34% | New |
| Independent | | 28 | – | – | – | 7,855 | 3,483▲ | 0.23% | 0.11▲ |
| Union Nationale | André Léveillé | 19 | – | – | – | 7,759 | 136,311▼ | 0.23% | 3.77▼ |
| Green | | 10 | – | – | – | 4,613 | 4,613▲ | 0.14% | New |
| Independent Liberal | | 1 | – | – | – | 4,001 | 4,001▲ | 0.12% | New |
| Humanist | | 17 | – | – | – | 3,050 | 3,050▲ | 0.09% | New |
| Commonwealth of Canada | | 28 | – | – | – | 2,240 | 2,240▲ | 0.07% | New |
| Regroupement autonome des jeunes | | 3 | – | – | – | 2,161 | 2,161▲ | 0.06% | New |
| Socialist Movement | Roger Deslauriers | 10 | – | – | – | 1,809 | 1,809▲ | 0.05% | New |
| United Social Credit | Jean-Paul Poulin | 12 | – | – | – | 1,650 | 366▲ | 0.05% | 0.01▲ |
| Communist | Sam Walsh | 10 | – | – | – | 834 | 66▲ | 0.02% | – |
| Workers | | 4 | – | – | – | 387 | 640▼ | 0.01% | 0.02▼ |
| Total | | 666 | 122 | 122 | | 3,411,607 | | 100.00% | |
| Rejected ballots | | | | | | 52,625 | 14,102▲ | | |
| Voter turnout | | | | | | 3,464,232 | 174,388▼ | 75.69 | 6.83▼ |
| Registered electors | | | | | | 4,576,600 | 170,324▲ | | |

=== Vote and seat summaries ===
Ternary plots - shift of electoral support (1981-1985)
1981

1985
Electoral districts identified by colours of winning parties

Seats and popular vote by party
| Party | Seats | Votes | Change (pp) |
|---|---|---|---|
| █ Liberal | 99 / 122 | 55.99% | 9.91 |
| █ Parti Québécois | 23 / 122 | 38.69% | -10.57 |
| █ New Democratic | 0 / 122 | 2.42% | 2.42 |
| █ Progressive Conservative | 0 / 122 | 1.03% | 1.03 |
| █ Union Nationale | 0 / 122 | 0.23% | -3.77 |
| █ Independent | 0 / 122 | 0.23% | 0.11 |
| █ Other | 0 / 122 | 1.41% | 0.87 |

=== Synopsis of results ===
Results by riding - 1985 Quebec general election
| Riding | Winning party | | | | | | Turnout (Note: including spoilt ballots) | Votes | | | | | | | | | | |
| Name | 1981 | Party | Votes | Share | Margin # | Margin % | Turnout | Lib | PQ | NDP | PC | PI | CS | UN | I-Lib | Ind | Oth | Total |
|---|---|---|---|---|---|---|---|---|---|---|---|---|---|---|---|---|---|---|
| Abitibi-Est | PQ | Lib | 9,202 | 51.85% | 1,742 | 9.82% | 62.85% | 9,202 | 7,460 | 372 | 663 | – | 51 | – | – | – | – | 17,748 |
| Abitibi-Ouest | PQ | PQ | 10,859 | 54.64% | 2,345 | 11.80% | 62.49% | 8,514 | 10,859 | 426 | – | – | 73 | – | – | – | – | 19,872 |
| Anjou | PQ | PQ | 16,258 | 48.60% | 354 | 1.06% | 77.15% | 15,904 | 16,258 | 977 | – | – | – | – | – | – | 317 | 33,456 |
| Argenteuil | Lib | Lib | 17,220 | 65.65% | 9,476 | 36.13% | 74.35% | 17,220 | 7,744 | – | – | – | 178 | 1,088 | – | – | – | 26,230 |
| Arthabaska | PQ | Lib | 16,608 | 49.83% | 2,038 | 6.11% | 79.79% | 16,608 | 14,570 | 801 | – | – | 85 | 817 | – | 450 | – | 33,331 |
| Beauce-Nord | PQ | Lib | 19,418 | 54.06% | 4,855 | 13.52% | 79.73% | 19,418 | 14,563 | – | – | 519 | 167 | – | – | 1,250 | – | 35,917 |
| Beauce-Sud | Lib | Lib | 19,592 | 66.12% | 9,974 | 33.66% | 78.80% | 19,592 | 9,618 | – | – | – | 422 | – | – | – | – | 29,632 |
| Beauharnois | PQ | Lib | 16,621 | 50.51% | 2,619 | 7.96% | 82.61% | 16,621 | 14,002 | – | – | – | 87 | – | – | 992 | 1,205 | 32,907 |
| Bellechasse | PQ | Lib | 12,754 | 54.82% | 2,516 | 10.81% | 79.02% | 12,754 | 10,238 | – | – | – | 275 | – | – | – | – | 23,267 |
| Berthier | Lib | Lib | 17,561 | 63.00% | 8,232 | 29.53% | 78.48% | 17,561 | 9,329 | – | 373 | – | 124 | 489 | – | – | – | 27,876 |
| Bertrand | PQ | PQ | 17,181 | 48.89% | 229 | 0.65% | 87.50% | 16,952 | 17,181 | 586 | – | – | 46 | – | – | – | 374 | 35,139 |
| Bonaventure | Lib | Lib | 13,701 | 65.92% | 6,877 | 33.09% | 74.85% | 13,701 | 6,824 | – | – | – | 259 | – | – | – | – | 20,784 |
| Bourassa | PQ | Lib | 15,727 | 59.09% | 6,469 | 24.30% | 74.41% | 15,727 | 9,258 | 651 | 533 | 286 | 65 | – | – | – | 96 | 26,616 |
| Bourget | PQ | Lib | 13,272 | 52.29% | 2,687 | 10.59% | 76.41% | 13,272 | 10,585 | 554 | 248 | 272 | 53 | – | – | – | 399 | 25,383 |
| Brome-Missisquoi | Lib | Lib | 16,500 | 68.83% | 10,044 | 41.90% | 74.47% | 16,500 | 6,456 | 880 | – | – | 136 | – | – | – | – | 23,972 |
| Chambly | PQ | Lib | 16,330 | 54.61% | 4,005 | 13.39% | 81.61% | 16,330 | 12,325 | 1,096 | – | – | 151 | – | – | – | – | 29,902 |
| Champlain | PQ | Lib | 16,652 | 51.80% | 2,428 | 7.55% | 80.29% | 16,652 | 14,224 | 1,269 | – | – | – | – | – | – | – | 32,145 |
| Chapleau | Lib | Lib | 16,514 | 60.49% | 6,701 | 24.55% | 66.23% | 16,514 | 9,813 | 686 | – | 188 | 99 | – | – | – | – | 27,300 |
| Charlesbourg | PQ | Lib | 22,181 | 62.82% | 13,261 | 37.56% | 81.67% | 22,181 | 8,920 | 1,740 | 2,076 | 334 | 59 | – | – | – | – | 35,310 |
| Charlevoix | Lib | Lib | 14,847 | 61.13% | 6,039 | 24.86% | 80.03% | 14,847 | 8,808 | 634 | – | – | – | – | – | – | – | 24,289 |
| Châteauguay | PQ | Lib | 20,209 | 54.25% | 4,263 | 11.44% | 79.16% | 20,209 | 15,946 | 948 | – | – | 151 | – | – | – | – | 37,254 |
| Chauveau | PQ | Lib | 19,850 | 58.23% | 8,513 | 24.97% | 77.14% | 19,850 | 11,337 | 1,720 | – | – | 149 | 1,031 | – | – | – | 34,087 |
| Chicoutimi | PQ | PQ | 17,476 | 53.11% | 3,760 | 11.43% | 76.56% | 13,716 | 17,476 | 1,429 | – | – | 119 | – | – | – | 167 | 32,907 |
| Chomedey | Lib | Lib | 21,622 | 72.66% | 14,800 | 49.73% | 72.26% | 21,622 | 6,822 | 799 | – | 336 | 77 | – | – | – | 103 | 29,759 |
| Crémazie | PQ | Lib | 16,115 | 49.89% | 1,555 | 4.81% | 80.03% | 16,115 | 14,560 | 765 | 233 | 276 | 62 | – | – | 211 | 78 | 32,300 |
| D'Arcy-McGee | Lib | Lib | 22,799 | 91.45% | 21,672 | 86.93% | 68.58% | 22,799 | 1,127 | 937 | – | – | 67 | – | – | – | – | 24,930 |
| Deux-Montagnes | PQ | Lib | 15,892 | 51.95% | 4,455 | 14.56% | 77.51% | 15,892 | 11,437 | 490 | 394 | 2,274 | 103 | – | – | – | – | 30,590 |
| Dorion | PQ | Lib | 12,724 | 51.71% | 2,498 | 10.15% | 74.58% | 12,724 | 10,226 | 653 | 290 | 268 | 55 | – | – | 36 | 353 | 24,605 |
| Drummond | PQ | Lib | 16,584 | 47.93% | 102 | 0.29% | 79.85% | 16,584 | 16,482 | 585 | 947 | – | – | – | – | – | – | 34,598 |
| Dubuc | PQ | PQ | 14,147 | 55.32% | 4,171 | 16.31% | 78.73% | 9,976 | 14,147 | 950 | 420 | – | 81 | – | – | – | – | 25,574 |
| Duplessis | PQ | PQ | 12,377 | 49.81% | 274 | 1.10% | 69.02% | 12,103 | 12,377 | – | – | 223 | 145 | – | – | – | – | 24,848 |
| Fabre | PQ | Lib | 15,130 | 51.38% | 1,931 | 6.56% | 80.19% | 15,130 | 13,199 | 668 | – | 371 | 81 | – | – | – | – | 29,449 |
| Frontenac | PQ | Lib | 14,606 | 51.85% | 3,222 | 11.44% | 80.08% | 14,606 | 11,384 | – | 2,027 | – | 151 | – | – | – | – | 28,168 |
| Gaspé | PQ | Lib | 13,880 | 57.71% | 4,000 | 16.63% | 74.47% | 13,880 | 9,880 | – | – | – | 290 | – | – | – | – | 24,050 |
| Gatineau | Lib | Lib | 13,571 | 65.23% | 7,619 | 36.62% | 69.19% | 13,571 | 5,952 | 532 | 673 | – | 78 | – | – | – | – | 20,806 |
| Gouin | PQ | PQ | 11,212 | 48.46% | 722 | 3.12% | 73.79% | 10,490 | 11,212 | 665 | 181 | 341 | 51 | – | – | – | 198 | 23,138 |
| Groulx | PQ | Lib | 17,692 | 49.07% | 621 | 1.72% | 78.25% | 17,692 | 17,071 | – | – | 499 | – | 459 | – | – | 335 | 36,056 |
| Hull | Lib | Lib | 16,375 | 61.09% | 7,434 | 27.73% | 65.51% | 16,375 | 8,941 | 1,016 | – | – | 65 | – | – | – | 407 | 26,804 |
| Huntingdon | Lib | Lib | 13,405 | 60.90% | 6,299 | 28.62% | 74.66% | 13,405 | 7,106 | – | 1,222 | – | – | – | – | 279 | – | 22,012 |
| Iberville | PQ | Lib | 18,353 | 55.02% | 4,685 | 14.04% | 80.36% | 18,353 | 13,668 | 495 | 707 | – | 136 | – | – | – | – | 33,359 |
| Îles-de-la-Madeleine | PQ | Lib | 5,048 | 56.02% | 1,184 | 13.14% | 86.61% | 5,048 | 3,864 | – | – | – | – | 99 | – | – | – | 9,011 |
| Jacques-Cartier | Lib | Lib | 24,245 | 80.36% | 20,404 | 67.63% | 77.41% | 24,245 | 3,841 | 1,025 | 624 | – | 67 | – | – | – | 369 | 30,171 |
| Jean-Talon | Lib | Lib | 18,396 | 58.39% | 7,656 | 24.30% | 82.79% | 18,396 | 10,740 | 1,727 | 256 | – | 94 | 291 | – | – | – | 31,504 |
| Jeanne-Mance | Lib | Lib | 20,772 | 70.24% | 13,283 | 44.92% | 74.13% | 20,772 | 7,489 | 411 | 609 | – | 40 | 150 | – | – | 100 | 29,571 |
| Johnson | PQ | PQ | 13,644 | 51.58% | 1,672 | 6.32% | 79.57% | 11,972 | 13,644 | – | – | – | 99 | 476 | – | 262 | – | 26,453 |
| Joliette | PQ | PQ | 15,288 | 50.53% | 2,175 | 7.19% | 79.62% | 13,113 | 15,288 | – | 659 | – | 58 | – | – | – | 1,140 | 30,258 |
| Jonquière | PQ | PQ | 17,741 | 52.51% | 3,611 | 10.69% | 79.86% | 14,130 | 17,741 | 1,784 | – | – | 132 | – | – | – | – | 33,787 |
| Kamouraska-Témiscouata | PQ | Lib | 14,043 | 57.39% | 5,190 | 21.21% | 70.15% | 14,043 | 8,853 | – | – | 781 | 88 | – | – | – | 704 | 24,469 |
| L'Acadie | Lib | Lib | 22,572 | 74.03% | 15,956 | 52.33% | 75.38% | 22,572 | 6,616 | 946 | – | – | 190 | – | – | – | 165 | 30,489 |
| L'Assomption | PQ | Lib | 15,627 | 41.93% | 216 | 0.58% | 77.06% | 15,627 | 15,411 | – | 5,429 (Note: André Asselin was the PC leader) | 422 | – | 273 | – | – | 103 | 37,265 |
| La Peltrie | PQ | Lib | 19,819 | 55.93% | 6,357 | 17.94% | 82.83% | 19,819 | 13,462 | 1,968 | – | – | 189 | – | – | – | – | 35,438 |
| Labelle | PQ | Lib | 15,197 | 50.36% | 2,507 | 8.31% | 73.89% | 15,197 | 12,690 | – | 1,546 | 603 | 143 | – | – | – | – | 30,179 |
| Lac-Saint-Jean | PQ | PQ | 17,028 | 54.82% | 4,263 | 13.72% | 83.30% | 12,765 | 17,028 | 1,072 | – | – | 199 | – | – | – | – | 31,064 |
| LaFontaine | PQ | Lib | 19,577 | 50.46% | 1,855 | 4.78% | 76.47% | 19,577 | 17,722 | 608 | 460 | – | 83 | 348 | – | – | – | 38,798 |
| Laporte | Lib | Lib | 18,925 | 63.87% | 9,959 | 33.61% | 77.26% | 18,925 | 8,966 | 1,137 | 387 | – | 68 | – | – | – | 149 | 29,632 |
| La Prairie | Lib | Lib | 24,633 | 60.05% | 9,968 | 24.30% | 79.55% | 24,633 | 14,665 | 1,088 | – | 484 | 84 | – | – | – | 70 | 41,024 |
| Laurier | Lib | Lib | 16,044 | 65.80% | 10,078 | 41.33% | 68.86% | 16,044 | 5,966 | 830 | 393 | 425 | – | – | – | – | 724 | 24,382 |
| Laval-des-Rapides | PQ | Lib | 15,223 | 52.06% | 2,111 | 7.22% | 76.21% | 15,223 | 13,112 | 704 | – | – | 83 | – | – | – | 122 | 29,244 |
| Laviolette | PQ | PQ | 15,134 | 56.33% | 3,401 | 12.66% | 77.70% | 11,733 | 15,134 | – | – | – | – | – | – | – | – | 26,867 |
| Lévis | PQ | PQ | 20,520 | 49.09% | 1,474 | 3.53% | 79.95% | 19,046 | 20,520 | 1,154 | 437 | 323 | 80 | – | – | – | 240 | 41,800 |
| Limoilou | PQ | Lib | 16,822 | 60.54% | 8,483 | 30.53% | 74.54% | 16,822 | 8,339 | 949 | 783 | – | 103 | – | – | – | 792 | 27,788 |
| Lotbinière | PQ | Lib | 12,382 | 53.52% | 1,945 | 8.41% | 81.09% | 12,382 | 10,437 | – | – | – | 317 | – | – | – | – | 23,136 |
| Louis-Hébert | PQ | Lib | 16,913 | 51.90% | 4,634 | 14.22% | 79.64% | 16,913 | 12,279 | 2,798 | 287 | 252 | 58 | – | – | – | – | 32,587 |
| Maisonneuve | PQ | PQ | 12,373 | 51.75% | 2,088 | 8.73% | 69.53% | 10,285 | 12,373 | 495 | 138 | – | 76 | 322 | – | 49 | 169 | 23,907 |
| Marguerite-Bourgeoys | Lib | Lib | 19,469 | 73.44% | 13,350 | 50.36% | 74.03% | 19,469 | 6,119 | 795 | – | – | 128 | – | – | – | – | 26,511 |
| Marie-Victorin | PQ | PQ | 12,568 | 47.75% | 335 | 1.27% | 72.56% | 12,233 | 12,568 | 884 | – | 346 | 83 | – | – | – | 205 | 26,319 |
| Marquette | Lib | Lib | 13,356 | 60.51% | 5,521 | 25.01% | 72.28% | 13,356 | 7,835 | 419 | – | 150 | 55 | 158 | – | – | 98 | 22,071 |
| Maskinongé | Lib | Lib | 17,599 | 61.51% | 7,755 | 27.11% | 80.63% | 17,599 | 9,844 | – | 1,167 | – | – | – | – | – | – | 28,610 |
| Matane | PQ | Lib | 11,830 | 53.40% | 2,055 | 9.28% | 77.09% | 11,830 | 9,775 | – | 381 | – | 169 | – | – | – | – | 22,155 |
| Matapédia | PQ | Lib | 11,473 | 53.19% | 2,096 | 9.72% | 78.86% | 11,473 | 9,377 | – | 599 | – | 122 | – | – | – | – | 21,571 |
| Mégantic-Compton | Lib | Lib | 12,865 | 59.48% | 4,787 | 22.13% | 77.39% | 12,865 | 8,078 | 594 | – | – | 91 | – | – | – | – | 21,628 |
| Mercier | PQ | PQ | 12,062 | 47.11% | 1,102 | 4.30% | 71.12% | 10,960 | 12,062 | 1,200 | – | 319 | – | – | – | 128 | 933 | 25,602 |
| Mille-Îles | PQ | Lib | 16,189 | 54.20% | 3,547 | 11.88% | 80.86% | 16,189 | 12,642 | 573 | – | 373 | 91 | – | – | – | – | 29,868 |
| Mont-Royal | Lib | Lib | 17,865 | 79.17% | 14,638 | 64.87% | 69.74% | 17,865 | 3,227 | 675 | 231 | 126 | 94 | – | – | 35 | 312 | 22,565 |
| Montmagny-L'Islet | PQ | Lib | 14,492 | 60.52% | 6,349 | 26.51% | 74.18% | 14,492 | 8,143 | 564 | – | 199 | 47 | – | – | 500 | – | 23,945 |
| Montmorency | PQ | Lib | 21,115 | 59.37% | 9,942 | 27.95% | 77.75% | 21,115 | 11,173 | 1,200 | 1,351 | – | 101 | – | – | 625 | – | 35,565 |
| Nelligan | Lib | Lib | 24,112 | 75.42% | 18,173 | 56.84% | 75.75% | 24,112 | 5,939 | 1,123 | 798 | – | – | – | – | – | – | 31,972 |
| Nicolet< | PQ | Lib | 15,816 | 59.01% | 5,395 | 20.13% | 84.93% | 15,816 | 10,421 | 425 | – | – | 139 | – | – | – | – | 26,801 |
| Notre-Dame-de-Grâce | Lib | Lib | 21,024 | 77.83% | 17,726 | 65.62% | 73.02% | 21,024 | 3,298 | 2,333 | – | – | 82 | – | – | – | 275 | 27,012 |
| Orford | Lib | Lib | 16,672 | 59.43% | 6,765 | 24.12% | 74.74% | 16,672 | 9,907 | 632 | 729 | – | 111 | – | – | – | – | 28,051 |
| Outremont | Lib | Lib | 12,720 | 53.43% | 3,702 | 15.55% | 72.11% | 12,720 | 9,018 | 1,294 | – | 461 | 31 | – | – | – | 282 | 23,806 |
| Papineau | Lib | Lib | 12,452 | 58.59% | 4,382 | 20.62% | 74.03% | 12,452 | 8,070 | 732 | – | – | – | – | – | – | – | 21,254 |
| Pontiac | Lib | Lib | 13,888 | 72.08% | 10,265 | 53.28% | 62.80% | 13,888 | 3,623 | 896 | 783 | – | 77 | – | – | – | – | 19,267 |
| Portneuf | Lib | Lib | 18,406 | 69.10% | 11,219 | 42.12% | 81.34% | 18,406 | 7,187 | 726 | – | – | 52 | – | – | – | 264 | 26,635 |
| Prévost | PQ | Lib | 15,618 | 53.09% | 2,659 | 9.04% | 74.95% | 15,618 | 12,959 | – | 701 | – | 141 | – | – | – | – | 29,419 |
| Richelieu | PQ | Lib | 16,373 | 53.14% | 3,047 | 9.89% | 81.90% | 16,373 | 13,326 | 587 | – | – | 105 | – | – | 347 | 72 | 30,810 |
| Richmond | Lib | Lib | 12,356 | 63.81% | 5,532 | 28.57% | 80.96% | 12,356 | 6,824 | – | – | – | 184 | – | – | – | – | 19,364 |
| Rimouski | PQ | Lib | 15,116 | 48.78% | 284 | 0.92% | 75.06% | 15,116 | 14,832 | – | – | – | 185 | 853 | – | – | – | 30,986 |
| Rivière-du-Loup | PQ | Lib | 11,690 | 53.32% | 2,304 | 10.51% | 75.10% | 11,690 | 9,386 | 711 | – | – | 136 | – | – | – | – | 21,923 |
| Robert-Baldwin | Lib | Lib | 27,041 | 80.54% | 22,368 | 66.62% | 73.18% | 27,041 | 4,673 | 1,068 | 467 | – | – | 164 | – | – | 161 | 33,574 |
| Roberval | PQ | PQ | 16,684 | 52.64% | 2,035 | 6.42% | 77.87% | 14,649 | 16,684 | – | – | – | 364 | – | – | – | – | 31,697 |
| Rosemont | PQ | Lib | 14,810 | 52.65% | 3,065 | 10.90% | 75.11% | 14,810 | 11,745 | 742 | – | 394 | 27 | – | – | – | 413 | 28,131 |
| Rousseau | PQ | Lib | 17,314 | 55.14% | 4,115 | 13.11% | 73.82% | 17,314 | 13,199 | – | 632 | – | – | – | – | – | 255 | 31,400 |
| Rouyn-Noranda–Témiscamingue | PQ | Lib | 11,826 | 49.56% | 1,385 | 5.80% | 62.53% | 11,826 | 10,441 | – | 1,202 | – | 57 | – | – | 335 | – | 23,861 |
| Saguenay | PQ | Lib | 11,270 | 48.36% | 161 | 0.69% | 66.48% | 11,270 | 11,109 | 516 | – | 277 | 134 | – | – | – | – | 23,306 |
| Saint-François | PQ | Lib | 15,571 | 53.85% | 3,611 | 12.49% | 74.25% | 15,571 | 11,960 | 1,220 | – | – | 162 | – | – | – | – | 28,913 |
| Saint-Henri | Lib | Lib | 14,647 | 56.73% | 4,736 | 18.34% | 69.85% | 14,647 | 9,911 | 602 | – | 456 | 53 | – | – | – | 151 | 25,820 |
| Saint-Hyacinthe | PQ | Lib | 15,382 | 48.74% | 523 | 1.66% | 78.16% | 15,382 | 14,859 | 709 | 501 | – | 107 | – | – | – | – | 31,558 |
| Saint-Jacques | PQ | PQ | 10,659 | 48.61% | 1,864 | 8.50% | 68.93% | 8,795 | 10,659 | 1,115 | – | 417 | 23 | 129 | – | – | 789 | 21,927 |
| Saint-Jean | PQ | Lib | 19,589 | 57.68% | 7,451 | 21.94% | 78.97% | 19,589 | 12,138 | 1,028 | 863 | – | 66 | – | – | 279 | – | 33,963 |
| Saint-Laurent | Lib | Lib | 22,474 | 74.22% | 16,367 | 54.05% | 72.41% | 22,474 | 6,107 | 1,037 | 390 | – | 56 | – | – | – | 218 | 30,282 |
| Saint-Louis | Lib | Lib | 9,903 | 48.45% | 5,162 | 25.25% | 65.68% | 9,903 | 4,741 | 1,405 | – | – | 42 | – | 4,001 | 82 | 266 | 20,440 |
| Saint-Maurice | PQ | Lib | 14,802 | 54.70% | 3,540 | 13.08% | 79.91% | 14,802 | 11,262 | – | – | – | – | – | – | 994 | – | 27,058 |
| Saint-Anne | Lib | Lib | 12,565 | 60.92% | 5,666 | 27.47% | 65.89% | 12,565 | 6,899 | 633 | – | 260 | 98 | – | – | – | 170 | 20,625 |
| Sainte-Marie | PQ | Lib | 8,855 | 47.03% | 455 | 2.42% | 67.12% | 8,855 | 8,400 | 711 | – | 212 | 39 | 213 | – | 74 | 325 | 18,829 |
| Sauvé | PQ | Lib | 15,677 | 61.12% | 6,756 | 26.34% | 70.82% | 15,677 | 8,921 | 462 | 346 | – | 134 | – | – | 65 | 43 | 25,648 |
| Shefford | PQ | PQ | 16,460 | 49.54% | 611 | 1.84% | 79.73% | 15,849 | 16,460 | 284 | 261 | 180 | 70 | – | – | 121 | – | 33,225 |
| Sherbrooke | PQ | Lib | 14,163 | 49.31% | 648 | 2.26% | 75.67% | 14,163 | 13,515 | – | – | – | 104 | – | – | – | 942 | 28,724 |
| Taillon | PQ | PQ | 15,154 | 50.48% | 1,963 | 6.54% | 72.82% | 13,191 | 15,154 | 791 | – | 418 | 91 | 285 | – | – | 91 | 30,021 |
| Taschereau | PQ | Lib | 11,584 | 53.81% | 3,489 | 16.21% | 72.54% | 11,584 | 8,095 | 1,217 | 236 | – | 87 | – | – | 309 | – | 21,528 |
| Terrebonne | PQ | PQ | 18,555 | 56.67% | 5,678 | 17.34% | 75.37% | 12,877 | 18,555 | 810 | – | – | 74 | – | – | – | 428 | 32,744 |
| Trois-Rivières | PQ | Lib | 17,258 | 59.18% | 6,365 | 21.82% | 74.82% | 17,258 | 10,893 | 614 | – | – | – | – | – | – | 399 | 29,164 |
| Ungava | PQ | PQ | 6,414 | 51.83% | 917 | 7.41% | 54.74% | 5,497 | 6,414 | – | – | – | 463 | – | – | – | – | 12,374 |
| Vachon | PQ | Lib | 16,011 | 49.47% | 842 | 2.60% | 76.30% | 16,011 | 15,169 | 673 | – | 511 | – | – | – | – | – | 32,364 |
| Vanier | PQ | Lib | 16,668 | 54.89% | 4,797 | 15.80% | 77.04% | 16,668 | 11,871 | 1,671 | – | – | 155 | – | – | – | – | 30,365 |
| Vaudreuil-Soulanges | Lib | Lib | 23,440 | 64.36% | 11,566 | 31.76% | 77.43% | 23,440 | 11,874 | 924 | – | – | 181 | – | – | – | – | 36,419 |
| Verchères | PQ | PQ | 16,679 | 49.06% | 846 | 2.49% | 81.32% | 15,833 | 16,679 | 1,063 | 361 | – | 60 | – | – | – | – | 33,996 |
| Verdun | Lib | Lib | 14,860 | 64.27% | 7,954 | 34.40% | 73.80% | 14,860 | 6,906 | 659 | 216 | 183 | 50 | 114 | – | – | 134 | 23,122 |
| Viau | Lib | Lib | 17,086 | 66.12% | 9,658 | 37.38% | 71.05% | 17,086 | 7,428 | 864 | – | – | 118 | – | – | – | 344 | 25,840 |
| Viger | Lib | Lib | 20,060 | 68.28% | 12,106 | 41.21% | 76.92% | 20,060 | 7,954 | 617 | – | 235 | 86 | – | – | 131 | 295 | 29,378 |
| Vimont | PQ | Lib | 16,169 | 50.07% | 1,409 | 4.36% | 79.56% | 16,169 | 14,760 | 854 | – | 429 | 82 | – | – | – | – | 32,294 |
| Westmount | Lib | Lib | 18,458 | 76.55% | 15,083 | 62.55% | 69.66% | 18,458 | 3,375 | 1,916 | – | – | 63 | – | – | 301 | – | 24,113 |

= open seat
= turnout is above provincial average
= winning candidate was in previous Legislature
= incumbent had switched allegiance
= previously incumbent in another riding
= not incumbent; was previously elected to the Legislature
= incumbency arose from byelection gain
= other incumbents renominated
= previously an MP in the House of Commons of Canada
= multiple candidates

=== Analysis ===
Candidates ranked 1st to 5th place, by party
| Parties | 1st | 2nd | 3rd | 4th | 5th |
|---|---|---|---|---|---|
| █ Liberal | 99 | 23 | | | |
| █ Parti Québécois | 23 | 99 | | | |
| █ New Democratic | | | 79 | 11 | |
| █ Progressive Conservative | | | 18 | 22 | 8 |
| █ Christian Socialist | | | 8 | 24 | 28 |
| █ Union Nationale | | | 6 | 6 | 5 |
| █ Parti indépendantiste | | | 4 | 22 | 11 |
| █ Independent | | | 2 | 7 | 6 |
| █ Green | | | 2 | 5 | 2 |
| █ Regroupement autonome des jeunes | | | 1 | 1 | |
| █ Independent Liberal | | | 1 | | |
| █ Humanist | | | | 3 | 6 |
| █ United Social Credit | | | | 3 | 2 |
| █ Socialist Movement | | | | 3 | 2 |
| █ Commonwealth of Canada | | | | | 5 |
| █ Communist | | | | | 2 |
| █ Workers | | | | | 2 |

Resulting composition of the 31st Quebec Legislative Assembly
| Source | | Party | | |
|---|---|---|---|---|
| Source | | Lib | PQ | Total |
| Seats retained | Incumbents returned | 36 | 16 | 52 |
| Seats retained | Open seats held | 5 | 3 | 8 |
| Seats retained | Byelection loss reversed | | 4 | 4 |
| Seats retained | Ouster of incumbent changing allegiance | 1 | | 1 |
| Seats changing hands | Incumbents defeated | 37 | | 37 |
| Seats changing hands | Open seats gained | 13 | | 13 |
| Seats changing hands | Byelection gains held | 7 | | |
| Total | | 99 | 23 | 122 |

== See also ==
- List of Quebec premiers
- Politics of Quebec
- Timeline of Quebec history
- 33rd National Assembly of Quebec
