= Pierre Paradis =

Canadian politician (born 1950)

Member of the National Assembly of Quebec for Brome-Missisquoi
- In office 17 November 1980 – 29 August 2018
- Preceded by: Armand Russell
- Succeeded by: Isabelle Charest

Minister of Agriculture, Fisheries and Food
- In office 23 April 2014 – 26 January 2017
- Preceded by: François Gendron
- Succeeded by: Laurent Lessard

Minister of the Environment Styled as Minister of the Environment and Wilderness in 1994.
- In office 1989–1994
- Preceded by: Lise Bacon
- Succeeded by: Jacques Brassard

Government House Leader
- In office 1992–1994
- Preceded by: Michel Pagé
- Succeeded by: Guy Chevrette

Minister of Municipal Affairs and Minister responsible for Housing
- In office 1988–1989
- Preceded by: André Bourbeau
- Succeeded by: Yvon Picotte

Minister of Labour
- In office 1985–1988
- Preceded by: Raynald Fréchette
- Succeeded by: Yves Séguin

Minister of Manpower and Income Security
- In office 1985–1988
- Preceded by: Pauline Marois
- Succeeded by: André Bourbeau

Personal details
- Born: 16 July 1950 (age 76) Bedford, Quebec
- Party: Quebec Liberal Party
- Profession: politician, lawyer

Pierre Paradis (born 16 July 1950) is a politician in the Canadian province of Quebec. He represented Brome-Missisquoi in the National Assembly of Quebec from 1980 to 2018. A member of the Liberal Party, he served as a cabinet minister in the governments of Robert Bourassa, Daniel Johnson Jr. and Philippe Couillard.

Paradis's brother, Denis Paradis, is a federal politician who served in the governments of Jean Chrétien, Paul Martin and Justin Trudeau. The Paradis brothers are political allies.

== Early life and career ==
Paradis was born in Bedford in Quebec's Eastern Townships. He earned a Bachelor of Laws degree from the University of Ottawa (1973) and later took graduate studies in bills of exchange and business law at the same institution. He was called to the Quebec Bar in 1975 and worked as a lawyer before entering politics, specializing in constitutional and administrative cases. At age twenty-seven, he won a case before the Supreme Court of Canada against proposed limits on egg marketing.

Before joining the Liberal Party, Paradis was a member of the Union Nationale. He was a riding association president in the 1976 provincial election and later served on the party's provincial executive. He left when he learned that Union Nationale leader Rodrigue Biron was planning to support the "Oui" side in Quebec's 1980 referendum on sovereignty.

== Member of the legislature ==
Paradis was elected to the National Assembly in a by-election held shortly after the 1980 referendum. He was re-elected in the 1981 general election. The Parti Québécois was in government during this period, and Paradis sat as a member of the official opposition.

Paradis was appointed as his party's labour critic in October 1982. He increased his profile in early 1983 by asking rigorous questions of Parti Québécois members during a televised hearing into the role played by Quebec Premier René Lévesque's office in approving a contentious out-of-court settlement.

There were rumours that Paradis would run for the Progressive Conservative Party in the 1984 Canadian federal election, although these ultimately came to nothing.

== Leadership candidate ==
Claude Ryan resigned as Liberal leader after his party's loss in the 1981 provincial election. A leadership convention was scheduled for 1983. Despite having a low public profile, Paradis declared himself a candidate.

Paradis centred his campaign around three principles: "respect for individual rights and freedoms", "the leading role of private enterprise in our economy", and "a firm commitment to [Canadian] federalism." He also called for the Liberal Party to change its image and identify more with the province's regions. He favoured the sale of some crown corporations and was considered the most right-wing of the leadership candidates. This notwithstanding, he also supported Quebec's universal medicare policy; one newspaper article described him as ideologically closer to Brian Mulroney, the leader of the federal Progressive Conservatives, than he was to Ronald Reagan, the President of the United States.

Several reports from the campaign described Paradis as a natural politician with effective organizational skills. One article referred to him as being "from the meat-cleaver school of oratory" with "no shadings of ambiguity."

Robert Bourassa won the 1983 Quebec Liberal Party leadership election with seventy-five per cent of delegate support at the convention. Paradis finished a distant second, narrowly ahead of third-place candidate Daniel Johnson Jr. Despite his loss, Paradis won the respect of other Liberals and improved his public standing through the campaign. In November 1983, Bourassa appointed him as the party's social affairs critic.

== In government, 1985–1994 ==
=== Minister of Labour, Manpower and Income Security ===
The Liberals won a majority government in the 1985 provincial election, and Bourassa became premier of Quebec for a second time. There were early rumours that he would appoint Paradis as Minister of Agriculture, but this idea was opposed by the Union des producteurs agricoles. Instead, Bourassa appointed Paradis as Minister of Labour and Minister of Manpower and Income Security on 12 December 1985.

Social assistance policy

Paradis revived a dormant government policy of sending inspectors to the homes of people receiving social assistance in 1986. He said this would reduce the number of erroneous files and likely save the province sixty-eight million dollars in one year. Critics charged that the inspections would lead to invasions of privacy and intimidation. The Ligue des droits et libertés and the Quebec Human Rights Commission strongly opposed the practice, and the Quebec Legal Services Commission argued that mandatory visits were unconstitutional. Paradis responded that the Justice Ministry had determined the visits were legal and that a provincial code of ethics would prevent abuses. Following extensive criticism, the city of Montreal quietly stopped the inspections in January 1988.

Paradis also announced in 1986 that social assistance recipients who owned cottages, boats, second cars, snowmobiles, or houses with more than $50,000 equity would have their rates reduced. While acknowledging that out-of-work adults who had exhausted their unemployment insurance had the right to keep some of their possessions, he added that the government had to set limits on luxury items and that this reform would allow greater payments to the "truly needy."

In late 1987, Paradis introduced further reforms that increased payments for those unfit to work, provided financial assistance to low-paid parents of young children, introduced a tax credit allowing welfare recipients to take minor jobs without jeopardizing their payments, and ended a policy of paying older recipients more than younger recipients. The reforms also required that able-bodied recipients take training, do community work, or accept minor, low-paid jobs; failure to do any of these would result in payment cuts. Paradis argued that the new policy would allow more recipients to enter the workforce; critics argued it would provide a supply of cheap labour for Quebec businesses. A The Globe and Mail summary noted that the bill had both progressive and conservative elements.

Construction sector

Paradis introduced legislation in 1986 to create the Commission de la construction du Québec (CCQ) to oversee Quebec's construction sector. The commission was overseen by representatives from labour, management, and the government and was mandated to issue certificates based on competency. Access to the construction trade had previously been determined by work experience, and Paradis said the new system would provide opportunities for younger workers.

Other

Paradis initiated a back-to-work order in March 1986 that ended a strike of 4,200 blue-collar workers in Montreal. The strike affected garbage collection and road repair, and Paradis argued it had created a safety concern; he also charged that the union neglected its responsibility to provide essential services. In June of the same year, he introduced emergency legislation to end a one-day strike of 100,000 construction workers across the province. In 1987, Paradis led cabinet in suspending the right to strike of maintenance workers in Montreal Transit.

Paradis increased the provincial minimum wage from four dollars to $4.75 per hour between 1986 and 1988. He worked to prevent layoffs at the Steinberg grocery chain in 1988.

=== Minister of Municipal Affairs ===
Paradis was appointed as Minister of Municipal Affairs and Minister responsible for Housing in July 1988. In this capacity, he oversaw the province's response to unusual developments in the city of Saint-Laurent. Following a complex dispute over municipal development, four opposition councillors decided to boycott council meetings and deny quorum. Paradis said in April 1989 that the situation had "sufficiently exhausted the patience of government", although he resisted calls to impose trusteeship before a key municipal by-election.

In July 1989, Paradis initiated legislation that saved the city of Montreal from paying $228 million in business tax refunds. A Quebec Superior Court decision earlier in the year had struck down parts of a municipal taxation bylaw; this decision prompted a flood of lawsuits, and Paradis reluctantly intervened to protect city's credit rating.

=== Minister of the Environment ===
Paradis was re-elected in the 1989 provincial election and was promoted to Minister of the Environment in October 1989. When Daniel Johnson succeeded Bourassa in January 1994, he changed Paradis's title to minister of the Environment and Wildlife. He also served as the Government House Leader from 1992 to 1994.

Ministry reforms

At the time of Paradis's appointment, the Quebec environment ministry was known for being disorganized and bureaucratic. In November 1989, he introduced restructuring changes directed toward fighting industrial pollution. The most notable change was the appointment of a deputy minister for sustainable development, charged with ensuring that new industrial projects would be environmentally sound. The following year, Paradis expressed disappointment that his department received only fifteen million dollars for restructuring rather than the expected fifty million.

Great Whale River project

As Environment Minister, Paradis was responsible for overseeing Quebec's environmental assessment of the proposed Great Whale River project. As such, he became involved in separate but overlapping controversies with one of his cabinet colleagues, the government of Canada, and the Cree of northern Quebec.

Paradis and provincial Energy Minister Lise Bacon engaged in a public dispute over Great Whale's schedule in 1990. Bacon wanted a two-stage environmental assessment that would allow access roads and airports to be constructed as quickly as possible. Paradis initially agreed, but he later called for a single comprehensive assessment when the Cree warned that a two-stage process would violate a prior agreement. He also stressed that Great Whale could be shut down if it was found to be environmentally unsound, while Bacon argued that it was necessary for Quebec's energy needs. The government ultimately approved the two-stage approach over Paradis's objections.

Paradis also opposed the federal government's bid to conduct an independent environmental assessment, on the grounds that Great Whale was within Quebec's jurisdiction. He reached an agreement with federal Environment Minister Robert de Cotret in January 1991 to conduct a shared review of the project's dams, but not of its roads and other infrastructure. This agreement later fell through due to differences between the parties. De Cotret's successor, Jean Charest, tried to establish a single, comprehensive assessment involving both levels of government; although Paradis still supported the idea of a single assessment, he opposed what he described as Charest's encroachment into the provincial domain.

The Cree of northern Quebec opposed the Great Whale project on the grounds that it would cause massive flooding in their traditional territories. Under Matthew Coon Come's leadership, the Cree used lawsuits and an international publicity campaign to draw attention to their concerns. Paradis expressed support for their position, although he criticized tactical decisions made by the Cree leadership.

The Bourassa government curtailed its development plans in August 1991, and Paradis announced that construction would not begin until a thorough environmental review had taken place. The following month, the Federal Court of Appeal ruled that the federal government was legally bound to undertake a comprehensive study of the project's effects on the environment and indigenous communities, and that it therefore had final authority over the project. The court also ruled that the federal and provincial governments could not undertake a joint review without agreement from the Cree and Inuit. The Great Whale project was ultimately cancelled by the Quebec government 1994.

Federal–provincial relations

In 1989, Paradis and Ontario Environment Minister Jim Bradley successfully pressured the federal government to increase standards for motor vehicle emissions. Paradis and Bradley also worked to harmonize their respective environmental laws, to ensure that companies would not be able to leave one province for the other to avoid regulation.

The Parliament of Canada passed a law in 1992 to increase federal oversight of projects such as dams and paper mills. Paradis described the law as "totalitarian", arguing that it encroached on Quebec's jurisdiction. The bill was not proclaimed into law until late 1994, by which time the Quebec Liberal Party was out of office.

In early 1994, Paradis reached an agreement with new federal Environment Minister Sheila Copps for a six-year program to clean up the Great Lakes and Saint Lawrence River. In the same year, the Quebec Environment Ministry was given sole responsibility for enforcing pulp and paper environmental regulations.

Other environmental concerns

In October 1991, Paradis approved a gas processing and storage project by Soligaz in Varennes. The initial provincial review recommended that the project be rejected due to safety concerns, although two subsequent reviews called for the government to approve it.

Paradis ordered the closure of a Tioxide plant in Tracy, Quebec in 1992, saying that the company had repeatedly broken its promise to improve environmental standards. The plant had long been regarded as one of Quebec's worst polluters. The company initially challenged the ruling, but shut down part of the operation in 1993.

A Montreal Gazette report in late 1991 noted that Paradis had "injected new vigor into the enforcement of anti-pollution laws" but added that he had not succeeding in making the environment a priority of the Bourassa government.

Canadian federalism

As a vocal supporter of Canadian federalism, Paradis had little involvement in the Bourassa government's turn to Quebec nationalism after the failure of the Meech Lake Accord. He opposed the nationalist Allaire Report and promoted changes to Quebec's Charter of the French Language to permit an increased use of languages other than French on public signs. In 1994, however, Paradis said that his party would need to reach out to Quebec nationalists for the "Non" side to win the next referendum on sovereignty.

Paradis chose not to run for the Liberal Party leadership when Robert Bourassa resigned for health reasons in 1993. Daniel Johnson won the leadership without opposition.

== House Leader of the Official Opposition ==
The Parti Québécois defeated the Liberals in the 1994 provincial election. Paradis, who was re-elected in his own riding without difficulty, served as opposition house leader after the election.

He campaigned for the "non" side in the 1995 Quebec referendum on sovereignty. Shortly before election day, he warned that Quebecers would vote for sovereignty unless the federal government and other provincial premiers gave the province "a signal" that Quebecers could expect favourable changes in a united Canada. After a last-minute rally, the federalist side won a narrow victory.

Paradis initially supported Daniel Johnson against challenges to his leadership in early 1997. Relations between the two men later became tense, however, and Paradis did not support Johnson against similar challenges in 1998.

When Johnson announced his resignation in March 1998, Paradis was again rumoured as a possible leadership candidate. He was known in this period as a strong parliamentary tactician whose fiscal conservative still put him on the right wing of the party. Some questioned whether he had the public profile to lead his party to victory. In the buildup to a possible leadership contest, Paradis criticized the federal government's Millennium Fund and a new program for the elderly as encroachments on Quebec's jurisdiction. He ultimately decided not to seek the leadership, and Jean Charest was chosen as Liberal leader without opposition. Charest kept Paradis as the party's house leader.

The Liberals were again defeated in the 1998 provincial election, despite winning a plurality of the popular vote. Paradis remained as opposition house leader for the next five years, and it was expected that he would be included in cabinet if and when his party returned to power.

== Government backbencher ==
The Liberals won a majority government under Charest's leadership in the 2003 provincial election. When Charest announced his first cabinet, there was general surprise that Paradis was excluded. When asked about the decision, Charest said that he wanted to highlight a new tone and a change of generation.

Paradis said that his exclusion marked a shift in the Liberal Party from the values of Robert Bourassa and Claude Ryan to a more right-wing approach. Despite his own right-wing background, Paradis was by this period regarded as a moderate who supported a role for the state in Quebec life and opposed Charest's labour policies and funding cuts.

In the months that followed, Paradis speculated about quitting provincial politics. He considered running as a Liberal for Saint-Jean in the next federal election and there were rumours that he would be appointed as a judge. He eventually chose to take his seat on the government backbenches in November 2003. In 2006, he voted against Charest's decision to sell part of the Mont Orford provincial park to private interests.

The Liberals were reduced to a minority government in the 2007 provincial election, and Paradis was re-elected by the narrowest margin of his career at that time against a candidate from the upstart Action démocratique du Québec party. There was some speculation that he would be returned to cabinet, but this did not occur. He considered running for speaker of the assembly in 2008, but he declined after meeting with opposition from others in his party. He instead supported Yvon Vallières for the position.

Paradis was returned again by an increased margin in the 2008 election as the Liberals returned to a majority government. As before, he was excluded from Charest's cabinet. He remained a government backbencher until the Liberals were defeated in the 2012 election, Paradis was narrowly re-elected in Brome-Missisquoi edging out his CAQ opponent by 0.72% or 303 votes the closest margin of his career. In the 2014 election, Paradis won handedly with 44.50% of the vote 16,5% higher than his closest opponent who won almost 28%.

== In government, 2014–2017 ==
The Liberals returned to office in the 2014 election under new leader Philippe Couillard. Paradis was sworn in as Minister of Agriculture, Fisheries and Food and Minister responsible for the Eastern Townships on 23 April 2014. This marked his return to cabinet after a 20-year absence. He held the latter post until 28 January 2016.

On 26 January 2017, Paradis stepped down as Minister of Agriculture due to a concussion after a riding accident. The next day he was removed from caucus after Premier Philippe Couillard received a letter from a complainant alleging that Paradis had engaged in sexual harassment. On 19 June 2017, Paradis was cleared of any charges by the Director of Criminal and Penal Prosecutions (DPCP). He was invited back to the Liberal caucus on 16 August 2018.

== Federal politics ==
Paradis's local organization supported Progressive Conservative incumbent Gabrielle Bertrand in the 1988 federal election. He later aligned with the federal Liberal Party and was rumoured as a candidate for a 1995 by-election in Brome—Missisquoi (the federal electoral district of the same name). After deciding not to run, he supported his brother Denis Paradis for the position. Denis Paradis won the election and was later a cabinet minister in the governments of Jean Chrétien and Paul Martin.

== Electoral record ==
2014 Quebec general election: Brome-Missisquoi
Party	Candidate	Votes	%	±%
Liberal	Pierre Paradis	18,103	44.50	+11.48
Coalition Avenir Québec	François Lemay	11,349	27.90	-4.40
Parti Québécois	René Beauregard	8,281	20.35	-5.11
Québec solidaire	Benoit Van Caloen	2,751	6.76	+2.12
Option nationale	Nicolas Pépin	199	0.49	-0.68
Total valid votes		40,683	98.49	
Total rejected ballots		623	1.51	
Turnout		41,306	73.13	
Eligible Voters		56,480	–	

2012 Quebec general election: Brome-Missisquoi
Party	Candidate	Votes	%	±%
Liberal	Pierre Paradis	13,841	33.02	−16.22
Coalition Avenir Québec	Benoit Legault	13,538	32.30	+15.65
Parti Québécois	Richard Leclerc	10,670	25.46	−1.86
Québec solidaire	Benoit Van Caloen	1,944	4.64	+1.74
Green	Louise Martineau	724	1.73	−1.59
Option nationale	Patrick Melchior	490	1.17	–
Conservative	Jacques Pipon	253	0.60	–
Coalition pour la constituante	Dominique Favreau	184	0.44	–
Independent	Jean-Pierre Dufault	141	0.34	–
Independent	Gilles Alarie	127	0.30	–
Total valid votes		41,912	99.00	–
Total rejected ballots		425	1.00	–
Turnout		42,337	76.55	+16.16
Electors on the lists		55,304	–	–

2008 Quebec general election: Brome-Missisquoi
Party	Candidate	Votes	%	±%
Liberal	Pierre Paradis	15,006	49.24	+9.39
Parti Québécois	Richard Leclerc	8,325	27.32	+6.98
Action démocratique	Mario Charpentier	5,073	16.65	−14.88
Green	Louise Martineau	1,012	3.32	−2.07
Québec solidaire	Diane Cormier	884	2.90	–
Independent	Jacques-Antoine Normandin	173	0.57	–
Total valid votes		30,473	100.00%	
Total rejected ballots		480	1.55%	
Turnout		30,953	60.39	−11.49
Eligible voters		51,255		
Source: Official Results, Le Directeur général des élections du Québec.

2007 Quebec general election: Brome-Missisquoi
Party	Candidate	Votes	%	±%
Liberal	Pierre Paradis	14,182	39.85	−15.79
Action démocratique	Jean L'Écuyer	11,221	31.53	+13.48
Parti Québécois	Richard Leclerc	7,238	20.34	−3.94
Green	Vanessa Thibodeau	1,917	5.39	–
Québec solidaire	Lorraine Lasnier	1,032	2.90	+1.37
Total valid votes		35,590	100.00%	
Total rejected ballots		298	0.83%	
Turnout		35,888	71.88	+1.44
Eligible voters		49,928		
Source: Official Results, Le Directeur général des élections du Québec.

2003 Quebec general election: Brome-Missisquoi
Party	Candidate	Votes	%	±%
Liberal	Pierre Paradis	18,546	55.64	-1.53
Parti Québécois	Lina Le Blanc	8,093	24.28	-6.59
Action démocratique	Pierre Plante	6,018	18.05	+6.70
UFP	Simon Gnocchini	509	1.53	–
Equality	Lionel Albert	167	0.50	–
Total valid votes		33,333	98.67	
Rejected and declined votes		448	1.33	
Turnout		33,781	70.44	
Electors on the lists		47,955		
Source: Official Results, Le Directeur général des élections du Québec.

1998 Quebec general election: Brome-Missisquoi
Party	Candidate	Votes	%	±%
Liberal	Pierre Paradis	18,127	57.17	−3.95
Parti Québécois	Raôul Duguay	9,789	30.87	+1.07
Action démocratique	Eric Larivière	3,599	11.35	+4.58
Natural Law	Jean-Charles Rouleau	194	0.61	−0.30
Total valid votes		31,709	100.00%	
Total rejected ballots		258	0.82%	
Turnout		31,967	80.56	-3.51
Eligible voters		39,680		
Source: Official Results, Le Directeur général des élections du Québec.

1994 Quebec general election: Brome-Missisquoi
Party	Candidate	Votes	%	±%
Liberal	Pierre Paradis	18,402	61.12	+6.94
Parti Québécois	Marie-Paul Bourassa-Marois	8,972	29.80	+4.77
Action démocratique	Benoit Trudeau	2,037	6.77	–
Equality	Ross K. Ladd	423	1.40	−9.66
Natural Law	Jean Cérigo	274	0.91	–
Total valid votes		30,108	98.51	
Rejected and declined votes		456	1.49	
Turnout		30,564	84.07	+8.15
Electors on the lists		36,354		
Source: Official Results, Le Directeur général des élections du Québec.

1989 Quebec general election: Brome-Missisquoi
Party	Candidate	Votes	%	±%
Liberal	Pierre Paradis	13,502	54.18	-14.65
Parti Québécois	Daniel Lavoie	6,238	25.03	-1.90
Unity	Graham Neil	2,756	11.06	–
Independent	Heather Keith-Ryan	1,936	7.77	–
Parti 51	Jean-Guy Péloquin	269	1.08	–
Independent	Robin Lawrance	137	0.55	–
Commonwealth of Canada	Maurice Boisclair	84	0.34	–
Total valid votes		24,922	98.01	
Total rejected ballots		507	1.99	
Turnout		25,429	75.92	
Eligible Voters		33,496		
Source: Official Results, Le Directeur général des élections du Québec.

1985 Quebec general election: Brome-Missisquoi
Party	Candidate	Votes	%	±%
Liberal	Pierre Paradis	16,500	68.83	+6.26
Parti Québécois	Wilfrid Laroche	6,456	26.93	−4.71
New Democratic	Ron Marchand	880	3.67	–
Christian Socialist	André Paré	136	0.57	–
Total valid votes		23,972	100.00%	
Total rejected ballots		216	0.89%	
Turnout		24,188	74.47	−6.85
Eligible voters		32,479		
Source: Official Results, Le Directeur général des élections du Québec.

1981 Quebec general election: Brome-Missisquoi
Party	Candidate	Votes	%	±%
Liberal	Pierre Paradis	15,832	62.57	+0.12
Parti Québécois	Marie Harvey	8,005	31.63	+3.57
Union Nationale	Jean-Guy Péloquin	1,178	4.66	-4.32
Freedom of Choice	Blair McIntosh	289	1.14	–
Total valid votes		25,304	100.00%	
Total rejected ballots		168	0.66%	
Turnout		25,472	81.32	+13.03
Eligible voters		31,325		
Source: Official Results, Le Directeur général des élections du Québec.

Quebec provincial by-election, November 17, 1980: Brome-Missisquoi
Party	Candidate	Votes	%	±%
Liberal	Pierre Paradis	13,271	62.45	+38.85
Parti Québécois	Gérard Comptois	5,962	28.06	+7.40
Union Nationale	Pierre-Paul Ravenelle	1,909	8.98	−40.29
United Social Credit	Joseph Ranger	107	0.50	–
Total valid votes		21,249	100.00%	
Total rejected ballots		154	0.72	–
Turnout		21,403	68.29	−14.64
Eligible voters		31,342		
Source: Official Results, Le Directeur général des élections du Québec.

=== Leadership Contests ===
First Ballot
Quebec Liberal Party leadership convention, 16 October 1983
Candidate Name	Votes	Percentage
Robert Bourassa	2,138	75.44%
Pierre Paradis	353	12.46%
Daniel Johnson Jr.	343	12.10%
Total votes cast	2,834	100.0%
