= Heather Keith =

President of the Townshippers' Association
- In office 1987–1989
- Preceded by: Della Goodsell
- Succeeded by: Mary Mitchell (interim), then Myrna MacAulay
- In office 2000–2001
- Preceded by: Gary Richards
- Succeeded by: Peter Quilliams

Potton Councillor

South Stukely Councillor

Heather Keith, formerly known as Heather Keith-Ryan, is an anglophone rights activist from the Eastern Townships region of the Canadian province of Quebec. She has served two terms as president of the Townshippers' Association and in this capacity has opposed provincial restrictions on the use of the English language. Keith herself is fluent in English and French.

== Private life and career ==
Keith moved to Quebec's Eastern Townships in 1967. She has owned a bed-and-breakfast in Mansonville, been a town councillor, served as vice-president of a local Chamber of Commerce, and worked as a realtor and teacher. In the 1990s, she co-authored a book for anglophone tourists entitled, Quebec: Bonjour Eh. The book was later re-issued as Quebec: Bonjour — Visitor's Visa to French-Speaking Canada.

In the 2000s, Keith received Bachelor's degree in social work at McGill University. She later started a Master's degree in gerontology at the Université de Sherbrooke.

== Community activism and political activity ==
Keith was elected to the municipal council of South Stukely in the 1970 municipal election and appears to have served for a single term. She was a founding director of the Townshippers' Association in 1979, and in 1987 she encouraged municipalities in the Townships to oppose provincial restrictions on English-language signs and billboards. She was elected to her first term as Townshippers' Association president in September 1987.

Keith testified before the Senate of Canada in 1988, opposing the proposed Meech Lake Accord on the grounds that its recognition of Quebec as a distinct society would threaten the rights of anglophones in the province. In the same year, she argued that Township anglophones were discriminated against in the federal civil service and expressed concern that the English population of the area was rapidly declining. In September 1988, she said it was a "crime" that there were no senior citizens' homes in the Townships to serve the needs of anglophones.

For the 1989 provincial election, Keith resigned as Townshippers' Association president to run as an independent candidate against Liberal cabinet minister Pierre Paradis in Brome—Missisquoi. She argued that anglophones should break their historical link to the provincial Liberal Party on the grounds that it had failed their community on language issues. Forty-nine years old at the time, Keith said that she supported laws to protect the French language in Quebec but that requirements for unilingual French were unjustifiable. She received 1,936 votes (7.77%), finishing fourth against Paradis. She later effected a political reconciliation with Paradis, saying in 1994, "he's honest, he's never hidden that he's a federalist, and he's been very present for his riding."

Keith was elected to the Potton municipal council in the 1989 municipal election and appears to have served another term in office. She was also vice-president of the Liberal Party of Canada's riding association in Brome—Missisquoi during the early 1990s. She wanted to seek the party's nomination for the 1993 Canadian federal election, but withdrew after being dissuaded by party officials. She subsequently sought the party's nomination for a 1995 by-election, but lost to Denis Paradis, Pierre's brother.

Keith remained active on language issues throughout the 1990s, often representing the anglophone community in francophone media forums. She was elected to a second term as Townshippers' Association president in 2000 and in the same year coordinated her group's presentation to the Estates-General on the Situation and Future of the French Language in Quebec. Speaking before the commission, Keith criticized the absence of English-language health services and said that efforts to introduce bilingual signs to Sherbrooke hospitals had been frustrated by the Office de la Langue Francaise. Despite general anglophone scepticism about the commission, she later said that it had been useful in building connections between Quebec's linguistic communities. She nevertheless expressed disappointment about some aspects of the final report, including what she described as "unclear recommendations" regarding health and social services.

Keith stood down as Townshippers' president in 2001 and became chair of the association's health and social services committee. She sought re-election to the Potton municipal council in the 2001 municipal election, but was unsuccessful. In December 2001, she commended the provincial government for appointing of anglophone candidates to the Estrie and Montérégie health boards. She later criticized a proposed merger of the Université de Sherbrooke Geriatric Institute with the CLSC of Sherbrooke in 2004, arguing that the institute's historical links to the region's anglophone community could be threatened.

In 2008, Keith was appointed to a municipal subcommittee in Sherbrooke charged with designing a new urban zoning plan. She ran for a seat on the city's Lennoxville borough council in 2009, but was again defeated.

== International work ==
In 2001, Keith began working with other grandmothers in the Sherbrooke region to support the efforts of South African grandmothers raising children who were orphaned by AIDS. Working through the Canadian Federation of University Women, Keith and her associates crafted Christmas ornaments that were sold to benefit the Stephen Lewis Foundation's Grandmothers to Grandmothers campaign. In 2010, Keith was one of forty-two Canadian grandmothers to attend the African Grandmothers' Gathering in Swaziland.

== Electoral record ==
Provincial

1989 Quebec general election: Brome-Missisquoi
Party	Candidate	Votes	%	±%
Liberal	Pierre Paradis	13,502	54.18	-14.65
Parti Québécois	Daniel Lavoie	6,238	25.03	-1.90
Unity	Graham Neil	2,756	11.06	–
Independent	Heather Keith-Ryan	1,936	7.77	–
Parti 51	Jean-Guy Péloquin	269	1.08	–
Independent	Robin Lawrance	137	0.55	–
Commonwealth of Canada	Maurice Boisclair	84	0.34	–
Total valid votes		24,922	98.01	
Total rejected ballots		507	1.99	
Turnout		25,429	75.92	
Eligible Voters		33,496		
Source: Official Results, Le Directeur général des élections du Québec.

Municipal

2009 Sherbrooke municipal election: Lennoxville Borough Councillor Two
Candidate	Votes	%
Mark McLaughlin	298	37.48
Alan L. Ansell	149	18.74
Heather Keith	118	14.84
Norman Green	95	11.95
Mohamed Adjel	69	8.68
Bernard Rodrigue	66	8.30
Total valid votes	795	100.00

- See the 2009 election page for details on the other candidates.

Source: Résultants 2009, Élections municipales 2009, Le Directeur général des élections du Québec.

2001 Potton municipal election: Councillor, Seat Three
Candidate	Votes	%
Louis Veillon	526	59.57
Heather Keith-Ryan	357	40.43
Total Valid Votes	883	100

Source: "Election 2001 Sherbrooke & Townships," Sherbrooke Record, 6 November 2001, p. 5.
