= Louise Roy =

Louise Roy may refer to:

- Louise Roy (administrator) (born 1947), university administrator and academic
- Louise Roy (Natural Law candidate)
- Louise Roy (politician), Canadian politician
- Louise Roy (soprano) (1924–1985), Canadian soprano
