= Independent and non-affiliated candidates in the 1994 Quebec provincial election =

There were sixty-eight independent and non-affiliated candidates in the 1994 Quebec provincial election, none of whom were elected. Information about these candidates may be found on this page.

== Candidates ==
=== Iberville: Wilfrid Laroche ===
Wilfrid Laroche is a retired contractor who also served as mayor of Sainte-Sabine, Quebec in the Montérégie for fourteen years. He joined the Parti Québécois (PQ) in 1978 and ran for the party in Brome—Missisquoi in the 1981 provincial election, finishing second to Liberal incumbent Pierre Paradis. He sought the PQ nomination for Iberville in the buildup to the 1994 election, but finished third against star candidate Richard Le Hir.

Laroche later ran as an independent in the 1994 election, saying that he had been encouraged to run after Le Hir made a number of embarrassing gaffes. Although Laroche kept his PQ membership, he said that he would remain an independent and not join the party caucus if he won. He finished well behind Le Hir on election day.

Electoral record
Election	Division	Party	Votes	%	Place	Winner
1985 provincial	Brome—Missisquoi	Parti Québécois	6,456	26.93	2/4	Pierre Paradis, Liberal
1994 provincial	Iberville	Independent	1,004	2.79	4/6	Richard Le Hir, Parti Québécois

Sources: Official Results, Le Directeur général des élections du Québec, 1985 and 1994.

=== Richelieu: Marcel Cloutier ===
Marcel Cloutier received 1,570 votes (5.03%), finishing third against Parti Québécois candidate Sylvain Simard.
