= Equality Party of Quebec candidates in the 2003 Quebec provincial election =

The Equality Party fielded twenty-one candidates in the 2003 Quebec provincial election, none of whom were elected.

Riding	Candidate's Name	Gender	Residence	Occupation	Votes	%	Rank	Notes
Bourassa-Sauvé	Boris Mospan	M			44	0.13	8th	Mospan has been active with the Ukrainian Canadian Congress in Montreal.
Brome-Missisquoi	Lionel Albert	M			167	0.50	5th	Albert is a longtime opponent of Quebec's language Charter of the French Language.
