= Ministry of Manpower and Income Security (Quebec) =

Government department in the Canadian province of Quebec

The Ministry of Manpower and Income Security (French: Ministre de la Main-d'oeuvre et de la Sécurité du revenu) is a former government department in the Canadian province of Quebec. It was created in 1982, when Premier René Lévesque divided the Ministry of Labour, Manpower and Income Security into two sections. The previous minister, Pierre Marois, had taken time off for exhaustion; when he returned, responsibility for Labour was given to Raynald Fréchette.

The ministers who oversaw the department were Pierre Marois (1982–83), Pauline Marois (no relation; 1983–85), Pierre Paradis (1985–88), and André Bourbeau (1988–94). Barbeau was styled as the minister of Manpower, Income Security, and Skills Development after October 1989.

The ministry appears to have been phased out in 1994.
