= Parti Québécois candidates in the 1981 Quebec provincial election =

The governing Parti Québécois fielded a full slate of 122 candidates in the 1981 Quebec provincial election. Eighty of the party's candidates were elected, giving the party its second consecutive majority government. Many of the party's candidates have separate biographical entries; information about others may be found here.

== Candidates ==
=== Brome—Missisquoi: Marie Harvey ===
Marie Harvey received 8,005 votes (31.64%), finishing second against Liberal Party incumbent Pierre Paradis.
