= Parti Québécois candidates in the 1976 Quebec provincial election =

The Parti Québécois (PQ) ran a full slate of 110 candidates in the 1976 Quebec provincial election. Seventy-one of these candidates were elected as the party unexpectedly won its first majority government with René Lévesque as premier.

Information about the party's candidates may be found on this page.

== Candidates ==
=== Brome—Missisquoi: Gérard Comptois ===
Gérard Comptois was a PQ candidate in the 1976 general election and a 1980 by-election. He was defeated on both occasions. In October 2009, he was given the honorary title "Grand Québécois" by party leader Pauline Marois.

Electoral record
Election	Division	Party	Votes	%	Place	Winner
1976 provincial	Brome—Missisquoi	Parti Québécois	4,772	20.66	3/7	Armand Russell, Union Nationale
provincial by-election, 17 November 1980	Brome—Missisquoi	Parti Québécois	5,962	28.06	2/4	Pierre Paradis, Liberal

Source: Official Results, Le Directeur général des élections du Québec, 1976 and 1980 .
