= Groupe socialiste des travailleurs du Québec =

The Groupe socialiste des travailleurs du Québec or GST (in English: Quebec Socialist Workers' Group) was a far left political movement founded in 1973 by militants of the Fourth International in the province of Quebec, Canada. Involved in trade-unions, the GST worked for the creation, in 1974, of the Regroupement des militants syndicaux and, on the municipal scene in the city of Montreal, of the Montreal Citizens' Movement (Rassemblement des citoyens de Montréal). The GST was also at the origin of the electoral coalition of the Nouveau Parti démocratique du Québec (NPD-Québec) and the Regroupement des militants syndicaux that contested seats in the 1976 Quebec general election. The GST also ran independent candidates in the 1981 Quebec general election.

The GST was disbanded in 1987. Most of its members joined the NPD-Québec.

While most of the GST's political existence and history were within Quebec, there was also a small English-language group centred in Toronto which worked in the New Democratic Party and some union locals. The proper name of the group during most of its existence time was "Groupe socialiste des travailleurs" (in English: Socialist Workers' Group), reflecting the fact that it was pan-Canadian in aspiration. The Toronto cell had developed around a split in the Toronto group of the Workers' League, and came to the Organising Committee for the Reconstruction of the Fourth International independently of the Quebec group.

== See also ==
- Politics of Quebec
- List of Quebec general elections
- Timeline of Quebec history
- Political parties in Quebec
