= Louise Roy (politician) =

Louise Roy is a former politician in Montreal, Quebec, Canada. She was a member of the Montreal city council from 1994 to 1998 and served as president of the Montreal Citizens' Movement (MCM) party. Since retiring from politics she has served in some managerial roles.

She is not to be confused with another Louise Roy, who is the chancellor of the Université de Montréal and has served as president of the Montreal Urban Community Transit Corp. and chair of the Montreal Arts Council. The other Louise Roy was also an MCM supporter and was sometimes rumoured as a mayoral candidate for the party.

== Early life and career ==
Roy was an activist in 1980, campaigning for bicycle lanes in Montreal. She later served as president of the Tour de l'ile de Montreal, worked with Cirque du Soleil, and led a regional tourist association in the Lac-Saint-Jean area. She was chosen as MCM president in February 1994 and, in her first press conference, argued that the traditionally social democratic party would need to take a more pro-business direction.

== City councillor ==
Roy ran for Montreal city council in the Laurier ward in the 1994 municipal election; at one stage in the campaign, she stood in for party leader and incumbent mayor Jean Doré in a debate on women's issues. The MCM was defeated by the Vision Montreal party on election day, although Roy won her own seat and joined council as an opposition member. Pierre Bourque, Montreal's new mayor, appointed her to chair the city's finance committee as part of a bid to include opposition parties in the governing process. She served in this role until 1997, when Bourque replaced her with a Vision Montreal councillor.

In 1996, Roy led the MCM in opposing Bourque's plan to privatize municipal water services. She resigned as party president in April 1997 and later served as its public safety critic.

The MCM subsequently went through serious internal divisions, and Roy and two other councillors resigned from the party in April 1998. She later joined the New Montreal Party and ran under its banner in the 1998 election. She was defeated by an MCM candidate.

== Since 1998 ==
Roy later served as publicity director for the group Divers/Cité. She was the marketing director for Montreal Gay Pride events, and in 2001 she served on the bidding committee for Montreal's campaign to host the 2006 Gay Games. Although Montreal's bid was successful, the city and the Federation of Gay Games later failed to agree on financial oversight of the event, and the games were moved to Chicago. In response, Roy helped to organize a rival Outgames competition in Montreal. The latter event was not a financial success, and Roy's early prediction that it would show a profit proved to be inaccurate.

== Electoral record ==
1998 Montreal municipal election: Councillor, Laurier
Party	Candidate	Votes	%
Montreal Citizens' Movement	Hélène Jolicoeur	1,846	30.14
New Montreal	Louise Roy (incumbent)	1,454	23.74
Vision Montreal	Odile Hénault	1,411	23.04
Team Montreal	Simon Robillard	1,102	17.99
Democratic Coalition	Jean-Guy Aubé	107	1.75
Independent	Denis Munger	106	1.73
Montreal 2000	Benoît Mainguy	99	1.62
Total valid votes		6,125	100
Source: Official Results, City of Montreal

1994 Montreal municipal election: Councillor, Laurier
Party	Candidate	Votes	%
Montreal Citizens' Movement	Louise Roy	2,254	39.93
Vision Montreal	Monique Côté	2,117	37.50
Democratic Coalition–Ecology Montreal	Yolande Cohen	676	11.98
Montrealers' Party	Gilbert Thibodeau	455	8.06
White Elephant Party	Benoît Mainguy	88	1.56
Independent	Richard Lemay	55	0.97
Total valid votes		5,645	100
Source: Official Results, City of Montreal
