= Parti Québécois candidates in the 2003 Quebec provincial election =

The governing Parti Québécois (PQ) fielded a full slate of 125 candidates in the 2003 Quebec provincial election and elected forty-five members to become the official opposition party in the national assembly.

== Candidates ==
=== Brome—Missisquoi: Lina Le Blanc ===
Lina Le Blanc was sixty years old in 2003. She had previously worked in medical technology and coordinated AIDS treatment with the Quebec City regional health board, as well as holding immigration and tourism positions in Quebec and New York. She moved to West Bolton in 2001. A longtime PQ supporter, she called for the creation of a provincial walking tour for Brome-Missisquoi in the 2003 election. She received 8,093 votes (24.28%), finishing second against Liberal Party incumbent Pierre Paradis.

=== Chapleau: Sylvie Simard ===
Sylvie Simard was thirty-nine years old in 2003 and had been the general manager of Mouvement action-chomage, a lobby group for the unemployed and non-unionized workers, since 1991. During the 2003 campaign, she defended Quebec's requirement of competency cards for construction workers. she received 6,512 votes (21.64%), finishing second against Liberal incumbent Benoît Pelletier.

=== Jean-Lesage: Robert Caron ===
Robert Caron received 9,408 votes (26.76%), finishing second against Liberal incumbent Michel Després.

=== Orford: Yvon Bélair ===
Yvon Bélair is a veteran entrepreneur based in Magog, Quebec who has worked for many years in the construction sector. There is an Yvon Bélair in Magog who is active with the Knights of Columbus; this is probably the same person.

Bélair has been a PQ candidate in two provincial elections and ran for the Parti Nationaliste (a precursor to the Bloc Québécois) in the 1984 Canadian federal election. Bélair was fifty-four years old in 2003.

Electoral record
Election	Division	Party	Votes	%	Place	Winner
1981 provincial	Orford	Parti Québécois	12,186	41.88	2/3	Georges Vaillancourt, Liberal
1984 federal	Brome—Missisquoi	Parti Nationaliste	997	2.44	4/6	Gabrielle Bertrand, Progressive Conservative
2003 provincial	Orford	Parti Québecois	11,037	31.54	2/4	Pierre Reid, Liberal
