= Union Nationale candidates in the 1976 Quebec provincial election =

The Union Nationale ran 108 candidates in the 1976 Quebec provincial election. Eleven of the party's candidates were elected, leaving the party as the third largest in the National Assembly of Quebec.

Some of the party's candidates have separate biography pages; information about others may be found here. This page also includes information about Union Nationale candidates in by-elections between 1976 and 1981.

== Candidates ==
=== Laurentides-Labelle: Laurent Jetté ===
Laurent Jetté received 2,992 votes (10.68%), finishing third against Parti Québécois candidate Jacques Léonard.

== By-elections ==
=== Brome—Missisquoi, April 13, 1980: Pierre-Paul Ravenelle ===
Pierre-Paul Ravenelle was a Parti Québécois (PQ) member in the 1970s. He later left the PQ, arguing that it was ignoring its grassroots supporters. He added that Quebec separatism was never his primary ambition, even when he was a member of the party.

He was a reluctant Union Nationale candidate in 1980, running only when no other party members stepped forward. He received 1,909 votes (8.98%), finishing third against Liberal Party candidate Pierre Paradis.

Ravenelle served as mayor of Bedford from April to November 1987.
