= Green Party of Quebec candidates in the 2007 Quebec provincial election =

Political party

The Parti vert du Québec/Green Party of Quebec (PVQ) ran 108 candidates in the 2007 Quebec provincial election, none of whom were elected.

== Candidates ==
=== Brome—Missisquoi: Vanessa Thibodeau ===
Vanessa Thibodeau appears to have run a low-profile campaign in the 2007 election. The Sherbrooke Record newspaper noted that the Green Party's election website had no information about her or her plans for the division; the paper further speculated that her candidacy was only to ensure the party would appear on the ballot. She received votes 1,917 votes (5.39%), finishing fourth against Liberal Party incumbent Pierre Paradis.

=== Jean-Lesage: Lucien Rodrigue ===
Lucien Rodrigue is a medical doctor who also holds a bachelor's degree in agro-economy. At the time of the 2007 election, he had worked for almost twenty years at the Saint-François D’Assise Hospital in Quebec City. He focused his campaign on health issues, on one occasion taking part in a prominent Green Party press conference on the subject. He also called for the construction of a soccer field in the Quebec City area, arguing that this would increase physical wellness among youth. He received 1,159 votes (3.33%), finishing fifth against Action démocratique du Québec candidate Jean-François Gosselin.

=== Richelieu: François Desmarais ===
François Desmarais was born in Sorel-Tracy and was twenty-four years old at the time of the 2007 election. Having previously earned a bachelor's degree in political science and a certificate in German studies from the University of Montreal, he was working toward a master's degree in political science at Laval University in 2007, focusing on defence policies in Germany since the end of World War II. He helped establish a Richelieu branch of the PVQ in 2005 and became secretary of the party's provincial executive in 2006. During the 2007 campaign, he criticized Quebec's longstanding freeze in university tuition. Desmarais received 986 votes (3.29%), finishing fourth against Parti Québécois incumbent Sylvain Simard.

=== Trois-Rivières: Louis Lacroix ===
Louis Lacroix has been a candidate of both the Green Party of Quebec and the Green Party of Canada. He was 26 years old during the 2006 federal election and identified as an agricultural technician. He has called for the legalization and controlled sale of cannabis, opposing simple decriminalization on the grounds that it will benefit criminal elements.

Electoral record
Election	Division	Party	Votes	%	Place	Winner
2004 federal	Drummond	Green	921	2.19	4/5	Pauline Picard, Bloc Québécois
2006 federal	Bas-Richelieu-Nicolet-Bécancour	Green	1,595	3.22	5/5	Louis Plamondon, Bloc Québécois
2007 provincial	Trois-Rivières	Green	739	2.68	5/6	Sébastien Proulx, Action démocratique du Québec
