= Natural Law Party of Quebec candidates in the 1998 Quebec provincial election =

The Natural Law Party of Quebec ran thirty-five candidates in the 1998 Quebec provincial election, none of whom were elected. Information about these candidates may be found on this page.

== Candidates ==
=== Berthier: Louise Roy ===
Louise Roy received 268 votes (0.72%), finishing fifth against Parti Québécois incumbent Gilles Baril. She is not to be confused with a better known Montreal administrator of the same name.

=== Brome—Missisquoi: Jean-Charles Rouleau ===
Jean-Charles Rouleau became active with the transcendental meditation movement in 1984 and identifies as an Ayurvedic scholar. He received 194 votes (0.61%), finishing fourth against Liberal Party incumbent Pierre Paradis.

=== Louis-Hébert: Jean Cerigo ===
Jean Cerigo was a Natural Law Party candidate in one federal and two provincial elections. He has lectured on transcendental meditation. In 2003, he led a group of the Maharishi Mahesh Yogi's Montreal followers in a bid to construct a twelve-thousand square-foot "peace palace" on the West Island.

Electoral record
Election	Division	Party	Votes	%	Place	Winner
1993 federal	Saint-Hubert	Natural Law	868	1.41	5/7	Pierrette Venne, Bloc Québécois
1994 provincial	Brome—Missisquoi	Natural Law	274	0.91	5/5	Pierre Paradis, Liberal
1998 provincial	Louis-Hébert	Natural Law	108	0.34	5/6	Paul Bégin, Parti Québécois

=== Mercier: Pierre Bergeron ===
Pierre Bergeron was a Natural Law candidate in one federal and two provincial elections. He described himself as a professor in 1993.

Electoral record
Election	Division	Party	Votes	%	Place	Winner
1993 federal	Laurier-Sainte-Marie	Natural Law	652	1.61	6/9	Gilles Duceppe, Bloc Québécois
1994 provincial	Viau	Natural Law	291	1.02	4/5	William Cusano, Liberal
1998 provincial	Mercier	Natural Law	154	0.49	7/9	Robert Perreault, Parti Québécois
