= Independent candidates in the 1989 Quebec provincial election =

There were thirty-four independent and non-affiliated candidates in the 1989 Quebec provincial election, none of whom were elected. Information about these candidates may be found on this page.

== Electoral divisions ==
=== Brome-Missisquoi: Heather Keith-Ryan ===
Heather Keith-Ryan received 1,936 votes (7.77%), finishing fourth against Liberal Party incumbent Pierre Paradis.

=== Brome-Missisquoi: Robin Lawrance ===
Robin Lawrance was born in Scotland and moved to Canada in 1962. He served in the Canadian Armed Forces during his youth and has said that he became politically active in 1982. He ran for the National Assembly of Quebec in the 1989 provincial election as an independent candidate and received less than one per cent of the popular vote in Brome—Missisquoi.

He ran for mayor of Cowansville in Quebec's 1990 municipal elections. The Montreal Gazette noted that his election circular was "hand-printed and filled with spelling mistakes" and that he provided no details to his $62,000 plan to make Cowansville's water drinkable. He lost to incumbent mayor Jacques Charbonneau by a significant margin. Lawrance has said that he once formed a political party called the "People's Party of Canada," but that he abandoned this project for health reasons.

Lawrance later moved to Ottawa, Ontario, and ran for mayor in that city's 2010 municipal election. Fifty-three years old at the time, he was identified in the press as a legally blind person. He said that he would promote the rights of the disabled, adding that he supported Ottawa's existing transit system over a proposed light rail plan. Shortly before the election, Lawrance was charged with assault for allegedly hitting his wife with a cane. He received less than one per cent of the vote.

Electoral record
Election	Division	Party	Votes	%	Place	Winner
1989 provincial	Brome-Missisquoi	Independent	137	0.55	6/7	Pierre Paradis, Liberal
1990 Cowansville municipal	Mayor of Cowansville	n/a	294	11.13	2/2	Jacques Charbonneau
2010 Ottawa municipal	Mayor of Ottawa	n/a	300	0.11	13/20	Jim Watson

Sources for election results: Official Results, Government of Quebec; Rita Legault, "Sherbrooke voters turf out their mayor," Montreal Gazette, 5 November 1990, A5; Official Results, City of Ottawa.

=== Richelieu: Rodrigue Lemoyne ===
Rodrigue Lemoyne received 1,296 votes (4.38%), finishing third against Liberal Party incumbent Albert Khelfa.

There is a public figure named Rodrigue Lemoyne from Sorel, Quebec (now a part of Sorel-Tracy), which is located in the Richelieu division. This figure, a lawyer, is best known for his colourful tenure as general manager of the Sorel Éperviers ice hockey team in the Quebec Major Junior Hockey League. During the league finals in 1974, he dismissed the team's head coach to take over the position himself. He moved the team to Verdun in 1977, but shifted it back to Sorel in the middle of the 1979-80 season. Lemoyne also represented star player Raymond Bourque in 1979 and, when Bourque was about to be drafted into the National Hockey League, tried to negotiate a financial settlement worth ten times the agreed rate for underage players. He lost this bid following pressure from Harry Sinden, president of the Boston Bruins. In 1988, he was reprimanded by a disciplinary committee of the Quebec Bar for insulting and threatening another lawyer. This may be the same figure at the 1989 candidate.
