= Parti de la Liberté de Choix =

Political party in the Canadian province of Quebec

The Parti de la Liberté de Choix (French pronunciation: [paʁti də la libɛʁte də ʃwa]; English: Freedom of Choice Party) was a political party in the Canadian province of Quebec. Focused on anglophone rights issues, it ran candidates in provincial elections from 1979 to 1982.

The party should not be confused with the Freedom of Choice Movement, a separate group that also promoted anglophone rights issues in Quebec.

== History ==
Quebec journalist William Johnson wrote in May 1979 that the party had unclear origins and was difficult to research, but that it seemed to have been founded by Armour Forse in either 1978 or 1979. Forse, a dentist originally from Nova Scotia, was a vocal opponent of Quebec's Charter of the French Language (aka Bill 101), which he described as a racist law. Forse supported linguistic freedom in education, work, and other spheres of life; as such, he opposed the Quebec government's efforts to promote the status the French language.

Johnson wrote that the party seemed to be an extension of Forse's political ambitions and was unlikely to achieve a breakthrough; while it claimed to represent both anglophones and francophones, it was in reality an anglophone party that could not put out proper French translations of its literature. It is not clear if Forse remained involved with the party after its formative period.

A 1985 article in the Ottawa Citizen described Freedom of Choice as an "ultra-right anglophone party," noting that its candidate in Pontiac during the 1981 provincial election had proposed shifting the region from Quebec to Ontario.

William Shaw, a former member of the National Assembly of Quebec who was focused on anglophone rights issues, led the Freedom of Choice Party in 1985.

== Electoral history ==
David DeJong ran for the National Assembly of Quebec in a 1978 by-election, as an independent candidate on a "freedom of choice" platform. The actual party seems not to have existed at this time. Forse and DeJong apparently met during the by-election and considered joining forces, but did not do so. It is not known whether DeJong had any subsequent involvement with the party.

The Freedom of Choice Party made its electoral debut in 1979, running candidates in two Quebec by-elections. The candidates appeared on the ballot as "without designation," as their party was not yet registered. Both fared poorly. Freedom of Choice later fielded twelve candidates in the 1981 provincial election and one candidate in a 1982 by-election. It appears to have folded shortly before the 1985 provincial election.

In the late 1980s, former party leader William Shaw became involved with the newly formed Equality Party, which was also focused on anglophone rights issues.

== Candidates ==
=== 1981 election ===
==== Brome—Missisquoi: Blair McIntosh ====
Blair McIntosh received 289 votes (1.14%), finishing fourth against Liberal Party incumbent Pierre Paradis. A few years after the election, McIntosh attempted to have a speeding ticket dismissed on the grounds that part of the court summons was written in French only. He argued that his home community of Lennoxville was recognized as bilingual under the French Language Charter and hence had an "obligation to provide fundamental services in both languages." The presiding judge disagreed, noting that the language law did not apply to the judicial system and that the ticket was written in both languages.

=== Robert-Baldwin: Duncan MacDonald ===
Duncan MacDonald was a candidate in the Robert-Baldwin riding, and received 495 votes (1.43%) and finished third to the Liberal candidate, and was also the Party leader at the time. He took a strong interest in human rights, as in the case he took all the way to the Supreme Court of Canada about being given a French-only traffic ticket.

=== Verdun: Terry Pye ===
Terry Pye was a candidate in the Verdun riding, and received 196 votes (0.69%), finishing fourth against the Liberal incumbent. A number of years after the election, he contested a unilingual French language parking meter ticket, ultimately losing the case. Rather than paying the fine he choose the jail time option, and became the first Canadian to serve a jail sentence because of Quebec's language laws.

=== Pontiac: Stephen Hodgins ===
Stephen Hodgins was a candidate in the Pontiac riding and received 1793 votes (8.02%) and finished third

=== Westmount: Allan Singer ===
Allan Singer was a candidate in the Westmount riding and received 428 votes (1.51%) finishing third. He was the party Vice-President at the time and an English rights activist.

=== Notre Dame de Grace: Roopnarine Singh ===
Roopnarine Singh was a candidate in the N.D.G. riding and received 501 votes (1.65%) finishing fourth

=== Nelligan: James Donovan Carter ===
James Donovan Carter was a candidate in the Nelligan riding and received 324 votes (1.03) finishing fifth

=== Mont-Royal: Winnifred Potter ===
Winnifred Potter was a candidate in the Mont-Royal riding and received 240 votes (0.89%) finishing fourth

=== Laurier: Stephen J Smith ===
Stephen J Smith was a candidate in the Laurier riding and received 253 votes (0.88%) finishing sixth

=== Argenteuil: Christopher Oulton ===
Christopher Oulton was a candidate in the Argenteuil riding and received 130 votes (0.47%) finishing fourth

=== Saint-Louis: Twila Roop ===
Twila Roop was a candidate in the Saint-Louis riding and received 132 votes (0.58%) finishing fifth

=== Marquette: Aldo Beccherini ===
Aldo Beccherini was a candidate in the Marquette riding and received 175 votes (0.67%) finishing fourth
