= Independent candidates in the 2008 Quebec provincial election =

There were thirty independent candidates in the 2008 Quebec provincial election, none of whom were elected. This page has information about these candidates.

== Candidates ==
=== Brome-Missisquoi: Jacques-Antoine Normandin ===
Jacques-Antoine Normandin (born June 17, 1951) was an activist with the Bloc Québécois in Pierrefonds—Dollard before running for office himself. In the 2008 provincial election, he claimed to be exempt from paying taxes by virtue of having renounced his citizenship. He advocated a tax exemption for other "dissidents" and a common law bar to compete with the official Bar of Quebec. His agent was later fined for not filing an election expenses report. He received 173 votes (0.57%), finishing sixth against Liberal Party incumbent Pierre Paradis.

=== Jean-Lesage: José Breton ===
José Breton has a Bachelor's Degree in Physical Education from Université Laval (1985). He has run for the Quebec National Assembly four times as an independent candidate. By his own acknowledgement, he did not have any specific message to convey in the 1985 election. More recently, he has campaigned as an "anti-diet" candidate.

Describing himself as an activist against the "thinness industry," Breton argues that the threat of obesity has been greatly exaggerated in modern western societies. In 1998, he called for the provincial health system to eliminate medical consultations about obesity for aesthetic purposes. His slogan in 2008 was, "Les femmes au gros derrière sont les plus sexy."

In 2007, Breton called for voters in other electoral divisions to support the Action démocratique du Québec.

Electoral record
Election	Division	Party	Votes	%	Place	Winner
1985 provincial	Montmorency	Independent	513	1.44	5/7	Yves Séguin, Liberal
1998 provincial	Shefford	Independent	90	0.22	6/6	Bernard Brodeur, Liberal
2007 provincial	Jean-Lesage	Independent	131	0.38	6/8	Jean-François Gosselin, Action démocratique
2008 provincial	Jean-Lesage	Independent	316	1.13	5/5	André Drolet, Liberal

=== Mille-Îles: Régent Millette ===
Régent Millette (born September 14, 1935) is a perennial candidate for public office, who ran several dozens elections since 2000.
