= Equality Party of Quebec candidates in the 1994 Quebec provincial election =

The Equality Party of Quebec ran seventeen candidates in the 1994 Quebec provincial election, none of whom were elected. Information about these candidates may be found on this page.

== Candidates ==
=== Brome-Missisquoi: Ross K. Ladd ===
Ross K. Ladd is a former civil servant and an anglophone rights activist from Cowansville in Quebec's Eastern Townships. In 1989, he led a Townshippers Association protest on Parliament Hill against Quebec's language laws, which restricted the use of English on public signs. He was quoted as saying at this time, "The English community is collapsing off the island of Montreal. Montreal (anglos) are in danger but they haven't reached the stage that we have." He later joined the Equality Party and was a delegate to its 1992 convention.

Ladd was sixty-four years old during the 1994 election and acknowledged that he ran simply to ensure his party would appear on the ballot. "No one's going to have a nervous breakdown on my campaign", he quipped, about his low profile. He described incumbent Liberal Member of the National Assembly (MNA) Pierre Paradis as a "good character," but criticized his support for the province's language laws. Ladd received 423 votes (1.40%) on election day, finishing fourth against Paradis.
