= Parti Québécois candidates in the 1994 Quebec provincial election =

The Parti Québécois (PQ) fielded a full slate of one hundred and twenty-five candidates in the 1994 Quebec provincial election and elected seventy-seven members to the National Assembly of Quebec to form a majority government. Many of the party's candidates have standalone biography pages; information about other candidates may be found here.

== Candidates ==
=== Brome—Missisquoi: Marie-Paul Bourassa-Marois ===
Marie-Paul Bourassa-Marois is descended from one of Quebec's best known political families; she is a granddaughter of Henri Bourassa and a great-great-granddaughter of Louis-Joseph Papineau, a prominent figure in the 1837 Lower Canada Rebellion. Raised in a political environment, she joined the Rassemblement pour l'Independance Nationale in the 1960s and later aligned with the PQ. She became president of the Brome—Missisquoi PQ riding association in 1992 and led the local "Non" side in the 1992 Canadian referendum on constitutional change.

Bourassa-Marois was forty-two years old during the 1994 election and owned a beauty salon in Dunham. She received 8,972 votes (29.80%), finishing second against Liberal Party incumbent Pierre Paradis.
