= Townshippers' Association =

Townshippers' Association is a non-partisan, non-profit organization mandated to support the rights of English-speaking people in the historical Eastern Townships region of the Canadian province of Quebec. It is known in French as the Association des Townshippers. The association has its head office in Lennoxville and a branch office in Knowlton.

Townshippers' Association was founded on October 27, 1979, in response to a declining anglophone population base and to the Parti Québécois government's introduction of the Charter of the French Language. The association promotes the interests and identity of the longstanding anglophone community in the region and hosts many cultural and community events. It is also mandated to maintain what it describes as "the spirit of neighbourliness that has long existed between French and English speakers in the region." The association had five thousand members by its first anniversary and claims about four thousand members as of 2011.

The Townshippers' Association has lobbied in favour of minority-language education and for anglophone representation on health and social services committees. In 1998, a representative described the organization as moderate and not given to confrontation or acrimony with the francophone community.

== Presidents of the Townshippers' Association ==
- Dick Stoddard, 1979-1980
- James Ross, 1980-1982
- Marjorie Goodfellow, 1982-1985
- Della Goodsell, 1985-1987
- Heather Keith-Ryan, 1987-1989
- Mary Mitchell, 1989
- Myrna MacAulay, 1989-1992
- Paulette Losier, 1992-1994
- David Morgan, 1994-1995
- Nancy Beattie, 1995-1997
- Theodora Brinckman, 1997-1998
- Gary Richards, 1998-2000
- Heather Keith-Ryan, 2000-2001
- Peter Quilliams, 2001-2004
- Heather Bowman, 2004-2006
- Michael van Lierop, 2006-2010
- Gerald Cutting, 2010-

Information on Townshippers' Association presidents

- Della Goodsell became a director of the Townshippers' Association in 1980 and was first appointed to its executive in 1983. As president, she said that her first priority was to encourage small and large businesses to provide local opportunities for anglophone Quebecers. In 1986, she called for increased anglophone services for elderly and special needs persons. She later criticized the closure of CKTS Radio, the only English-language radio station in Quebec outside of the island of Montreal. In the 2000s, she was a trustee of the North Country Concert Association.
- Mary Mitchell was a social worker during the 1980s. In 1989, she criticized the provincial government of Robert Bourassa for failing to enact a law that provided health and social service guarantees for anglophone Quebecers. She was chosen as interim president of the Townshippers' Association after Heather Keith-Ryan's resignation in 1989.
- Myrna MacAulay is a lifelong resident of Bishopton, Quebec. Her husband, Gordon MacAulay, was the community's mayor from 1955 to 1990. She was president of the Townshippers' Association during a period of generally bad relations between anglophone and francophone Quebecers in the early 1990s, and in April 1990 she indicated her gratitude that relations in the townships were still fairly good. During the same period, she called for the Meech Lake Accord on Canadian constitutional reform to be redrafted to provide recognition for anglophone Quebecers. In 1999, MacAulay was appointed to a committee to advise Hollinger Inc., which had just taken over The Record, on local issues.
- Gary Richards is a communications consultant based in Sherbrooke who has also served as a municipal councillor. He supported the "Non" side in the 1995 Quebec referendum on sovereignty, in part because he believed the Canadian federation to be the best mechanism to preserve the region's French language and culture. When he became president of the Townshippers' Association, he noted that his group would seek stronger ties with the francophone community and avoid the confrontational approach of Alliance Quebec, a group mandated to represent the anglophone population throughout Quebec. He was particularly critical of William Johnson, who was elected as Alliance Quebec's president in 1998. On one occasion, Richards said that Alliance Quebec had become a "pontifical soapbox" under Johnson's leadership. Richards was appointed as one of two anglophone representatives on the Estates-General on the Situation and Future of the French Language in Quebec in June 2000; some prominent anglophones opposed the appointment, arguing that Richards was not representative of the community as a whole. During the commission's public hearings, he defended anglophone guarantees in the health system. He later defended the commission's report as affirming the role of anglophones in Quebec society. In 2002, Richards and fellow commissioner Gary Caldwell called for a restructuring of Canada's constitution from the 1982 repatriation to include Quebec as an active participant. He has also been involved in environmental issues. In the late 1990s, he criticized the National Energy Board's decision to approve a natural gas pipeline through the Eastern Townships even though it had not received full environmental approval. He later became a member of Friends of the Earth Eastern Townships and was a founding member of the group Association de conservation de la nature de Stukely-Sud in 2004.
- Peter Quilliams chaired the Townshippers' Association's education committee before being chosen as its president. In the year before his election, he also chaired a committee that determined the association was spreading its resources too thinly and would need to focus on a smaller number of priorities. In October 2001, he issued the association's response to the report of the Estates-General on the Situation and Future of the French Language in Quebec. Quilliams worked with Heather Keith in 2004 to preserve the Sherbrooke University Geriatric Institute, which had historically provided many services to the region's anglophone community. After standing down as president, he chaired the association's knowledge base committee. He was chosen as the association's vice-president in 2010.
