= Québec solidaire candidates in the 2007 Quebec provincial election =

Québec Solidaire fielded 123 candidates in the 2007 Quebec provincial election, none of whom were elected. Information about these candidates may be found on this page.

== Candidates ==
=== Argenteuil: Guy Dufresne ===
Guy Dufresne is a university lecturer and union activist at the Université du Québec à Montréal. He received 600 votes (2.25%), finishing fifth against Liberal incumbent David Whissell.

=== Brome—Missisquoi: Lorraine Lasnier ===
Lorraine Lasnier has a professional background in administration and the arts, and she once owned a jewelry business. After suffering a serious illness, she researched alternative medicine and became active with events pertaining to indigenous spirituality. In the 2007 campaign, she focused on poverty issues and highlighted her party's pledge to raise the Quebec minimum wage to ten dollars an hour. She received 1,032 votes (2.90%), finishing fifth against Liberal incumbent Pierre Paradis.

=== Chapleau: Jennifer Jean-Brice Vales ===
Jennifer Jean-Brice Vales was nineteen years old at the time of the election and was a communications student at the Université du Québec en Outaouais. Of Haitian background, she said that she joined Québec Solidaire because of its positions on women's rights and immigration issues. She received 774 votes (2.39%), finishing fifth against Liberal incumbent Benoît Pelletier.

=== Nicolet-Yamaska: Jean Proulx ===
Jean Proulx was born in Baie-du-Febvre. He has a Master's Degree in Social Work, and has worked in the field of industrial relations at the Université du Québec à Montréal. He has also been involved in several community organizations, including those for women, youth, and persons with intellectual disabilities. During the 2007 election, he identified as a former Parti Québecois supporter who was disappointed with that party's shift away from its social democratic origins. He took an interest in health issues and called for the creation of a state company to coordinate pharmaceutical purchases, arguing that this would result in lower prices.

He received 1,121 votes (4.26%), finishing fourth against Action démocratique du Québec candidate Éric Dorion.
