= Lionel Albert =

Canadian politician

Lionel Albert is a businessperson, writer, and political activist in the Canadian province of Quebec. He is best known for his opposition to Quebec's language laws.

== Background and private career ==
Albert is of Lithuanian Jewish background. His grandfather, Simon Albert, moved to Canada following a regional pogrom in 1905.

A computer analyst in private life, Albert lived in Outremont, Montreal for many years before moving to Knowlton in the Eastern Townships.

== Cultural politics in Quebec ==
Albert is a vocal critic of Quebec's Charter of the French Language (otherwise known as Bill 101) and of Quebec nationalism in general. He argues that the Charter of the French Language violates the rights of Quebec anglophones, and he blames nationalist policies pursued by the Quebec government since 1962 for prompting anglophones to leave the province. He has also written that the French language is not under threat in Quebec and that the province would be more successful economically if it dropped its nationalist focus.

Albert is an ally of William Shaw, a longtime right-wing anglophone activist in Quebec and a former Member of the National Assembly (1976–81). Shaw and Albert wrote a book entitled, Partition - The Price of Quebec's Independence, in 1980, arguing that Quebec could and should be partitioned if it ever declares independence. (Specifically, they argue that the far north should be retained by Canada outright, and that the Outaouais, Abitibi-Témiscamingue, most of Montreal, the territory to the south of the Saint Lawrence River, and some borderlands with Labrador would likely remain in Canada following negotiations). Shaw and Albert also suggest that separation will never happen, on the grounds that nationalist francophone Quebecers have used the threat of separation to extract concessions from the federal government but recognize actual independence would harm their community. They further argue that French Canadians inside and outside Quebec are a distinct group with the right of self-determination, but that residents of the province of Quebec are not.

Albert has continued to express these and similar opinions since Partition's publication. In 1990, for instance, he argued that English Canadians were taking the threat of separatism too seriously. In a public debate in 1994, he suggested that Quebec should be partitioned to prevent more anglophone youth from leaving the province.

Albert's criticisms of Quebec nationalism have sometimes provoked controversy. In early 1990, he wrote a piece in the Montreal paper The Suburban comparing Quebec’s language legislation to Nazism. (When Michael Crelinsten of the Canadian Jewish Congress objected to this analogy, Albert responded by attacking Crelinsten in print.) In the same period, Albert wrote another piece for The Suburban suggesting that francophone Quebecers were "country people" and that anglophone Quebecers were "city people." The paper later apologized for Albert's articles.

== Political activism ==
In 1976, Albert became active with an organization called "The Preparatory Committee for an Eleventh Province". He has acknowledged that his primary concern was to remove language restrictions from anglophone Quebecers.

Albert joined the executive of the Equality Party of Quebec, which was focused on anglophone rights, shortly after its founding in 1989. When speaking at a party rally that year, he argued that the government of Canada could be justified in sending the Canadian Army into Quebec because of threats to the anglophone minority. A Montreal Gazette article subsequently described Albert as belonging to a "redneck anglo-rights fringe" distinct from more mainstream supporters of anglophone rights. Equality Party leader Robert Libman also clarified that Albert’s views were not those of the party. For his part, Albert later said that he did not favour sending federal troops to Quebec, but believed that the federal government should act with "all the force at its command" to protect what he described as threats to a minority culture.

In the 1993 Canadian federal election, Albert ran as a candidate of the unregistered Equality Party of Canada, which was aligned with the provincial party. During this campaign, he was quoted as saying, "The anglo minority in Quebec is just not represented in the House of Commons." He finished well behind Liberal candidate Bernard Patry.

Albert joined the Reform Party of Canada after the 1993 election. He attended the party’s 1994 convention and supported its call for an end to Canada’s Official Languages Act. He later criticized the Canadian Alliance, a successor party to Reform, for working too closely with Quebec nationalists.

In the 2003 Quebec provincial election, Albert ran for the Equality Party in Brome—Missisquoi. He again focused on language issues, saying that incumbent Liberal representative Pierre Paradis had not defended the rights of local anglophones. The Equality Party was nearly moribund in this period; on election day, Albert received less than one per cent of the vote.

In the 2008 Canadian federal election, he supported Conservative candidate Mark Quinlan.

== Other views ==
Albert is a prolific writer of opinion columns and public letters on diverse subjects. Among other things, he written against the metric system, criticized Pete Seeger as a communist propagandist, praised Chilean dictator Augusto Pinochet, defended Monsanto, and supported the 2003 invasion of Iraq. During the 2004 American presidential election, Albert attempted to counter the perception that George W. Bush received support from less intelligent American voters. His public letter on this subject included the statement, "Bush leads 55-42 among whites while Kerry leads 82-12 among blacks, who on average are less educated."

He is also opposed to abortion. In 1992, he wrote a piece comparing abortion care providers with hangmen.

Albert has written that he is not a Zionist.

== Electoral record ==
Federal

1993 Canadian federal election: Pierrefonds—Dollard
Party	Candidate	Votes	%	Expenditures
Liberal	Bernard Patry	39,974	64.98	$32,857
Bloc Québécois	René de Cotret Opzoomer	10,712	17.41	$16,510
Progressive Conservative	Gerry Weiner	8,106	13.18	$35,655
New Democratic	Catherine J. Rideout-Erais	864	1.40	$117
Natural Law	Ruby Finkelstein	480	0.78	$626
National	Carlos Roldan	474	0.77	$2,105
Libertarian	Hugh Rowe	410	0.67	$0
Equality	Lionel Albert	386	0.63	$5,004
Commonwealth of Canada	Glenford Charles	108	0.18	$0
Total valid votes		61,514	100.00	
Rejected, unmarked and declined ballots		925		
Turnout		62,439	81.01	
Electors on the lists		77,076		
Source: Thirty-fifth General Election, 1993: Official Voting Results, Published by the Chief Electoral Officer of Canada. Financial figures taken from official contributions and expenses provided by Elections Canada.

Provincial

2003 Quebec general election: Brome-Missisquoi
Party	Candidate	Votes	%	±%
Liberal	Pierre Paradis	18,546	55.64	-1.53
Parti Québécois	Lina Le Blanc	8,093	24.28	-6.59
Action démocratique	Pierre Plante	6,018	18.05	+6.70
UFP	Simon Gnocchini	509	1.53	–
Equality	Lionel Albert	167	0.50	–
Total valid votes		33,333	98.67	
Rejected and declined votes		448	1.33	
Turnout		33,781	70.44	
Electors on the lists		47,955		
Source: Official Results, Le Directeur général des élections du Québec.
