= Brome-Missisquoi (provincial electoral district) =

Provincial electoral district in Quebec, Canada

Coordinates: 45°10′N 72°45′W

Quebec electoral district

Provincial electoral district
- Legislature: National Assembly of Quebec
MNA
Frédéric Beauchemin
Liberal
- District created: 1972
- First contested: 1973
- Last contested: 2026

Demographics
- Electors (2012): 54,977
- Area (km²): 1,884.7
- Census division(s): Brome-Missisquoi (all), La Haute-Yamaska (part)
- Census subdivision(s): Abercorn, Bedford (city), Bedford (township), Bolton-Ouest, Brigham, Brome, Bromont, Cowansville, Dunham, East Farnham, Farnham, Frelighsburg, Lac-Brome, Notre-Dame-de-Stanbridge, Pike River, Saint-Armand, Saint-Ignace-de-Stanbridge, Sainte-Sabine, Stanbridge East, Stanbridge Station, Sutton

Brome-Missisquoi (French pronunciation: [bʁɔm misiskwa]) is a provincial electoral district in the Montérégie region of Quebec, Canada, that elects members to the National Assembly of Quebec. It notably includes the municipalities of Cowansville, Bromont, Farnham, Lac-Brome, and Sutton.

It was created for the 1973 election from Brome and parts of Missisquoi and Shefford.

In the change from the 2001 to the 2011 electoral map, it lost Austin, Bolton-Est, Bonsecours, Eastman, Lawrenceville, Potton, Sainte-Anne-de-la-Rochelle, Saint-Benoît-du-Lac, Saint-Étienne-de-Bolton, Stukely-Sud to Orford electoral district, but gained Shefford, Warden, Waterloo from Shefford electoral district.

In 2026, it lost Saint-Alphonse-de-Granby, Shefford, Warden and Waterloo.

== Members of the National Assembly ==
Legislature	Years	Member	Party
Riding created from Brome, Missisquoi and Shefford
30th	1973–1976	Glendon Brown	Liberal
31st	1976–1980	Armand Russell	Union Nationale
31st	1980–1981	Pierre Paradis	Liberal
32nd	1981–1985	Pierre Paradis	Liberal
33rd	1985–1989	Pierre Paradis	Liberal
34th	1989–1994	Pierre Paradis	Liberal
35th	1994–1998	Pierre Paradis	Liberal
36th	1998–2003	Pierre Paradis	Liberal
37th	2003–2007	Pierre Paradis	Liberal
38th	2007–2008	Pierre Paradis	Liberal
39th	2008–2012	Pierre Paradis	Liberal
40th	2012–2014	Pierre Paradis	Liberal
41st	2014–2017	Pierre Paradis	Liberal
41st	2017–2018	Pierre Paradis	Independent
41st	2018–2018	Pierre Paradis	Liberal
42nd	2018–2022	Isabelle Charest	Coalition Avenir Québec
43rd	2022–2026	Isabelle Charest	Coalition Avenir Québec
44th	2026–Present	Fred Beauchemin	Liberal

== Election results ==
2026 Quebec general election
** Preliminary results — Not yet official **
Party	Candidate	Votes	%	±%
Liberal	Frédéric Beauchemin	13,007	32.47	+19.21
Parti Québécois	Patrick Melchior	10,889	27.19	+15.61
Conservative	David Alarie	6,445	16.09	+5.64
Coalition Avenir Québec	Manuela Goya	5,249	13.11	–32.02
Québec solidaire	Michelle Corcos	3,585	8.95	–7.01
Parti nul	Frédérique Marseille	355	0.89	N/A
Canadian	Michelle Julien	271	0.68	–0.75
Présence	Ganaëlle Roy	252	0.63	N/A
Total valid votes		40,053	98.80	+0.02
Total rejected ballots		486	1.20	–0.02
Turnout		40,539	70.43	+2.44
Electors on the lists		57,556		
Liberal notional gain from Coalition Avenir Québec		Swing		+1.80
Source: Élections Québec

2022 Quebec general election redistributed results
Party	Vote	%
Coalition Avenir Québec	15,988	45.13
Québec solidaire	5,654	15.96
Liberal	4,699	13.26
Parti Québécois	4,102	11.58
Conservative	3,702	10.45
Others	1,280	3.61

2022 Quebec general election
Party	Candidate	Votes	%	±%
Coalition Avenir Québec	Isabelle Charest	20,576	45.87	+1.49
Québec solidaire	Alexandre Legault	7,318	15.91	-1.37
Parti Québécois	Guillaume Paquet	5,359	11.95	+1.23
Liberal	Claude Vadeboncoeur	5,344	11.91	-12.29
Conservative	Stéphanie Prévost	4,875	10.87	–
Canadian	Lynn Moore	642	1.43	–
Green	Caitlin Moynan	487	1.09	-1.27
Independent	Sébastien Houle	209	0.47	–
Climat Québec	Tommy Quirion-Bouchard	121	0.27	–
Démocratie directe	Pierre Fontaine	105	0.23	–
Total valid votes		44,856	98.82	–
Total rejected ballots		537	1.18	–
Turnout		45,393	67.99	
Electors on the lists		66,769		

2018 Quebec general election
Party	Candidate	Votes	%	±%
Coalition Avenir Québec	Isabelle Charest	18,407	44.38	+16.48
Liberal	Ingrid Marini	10,038	24.2	-20.3
Québec solidaire	Alexandre Legault	7,167	17.28	+10.52
Parti Québécois	Andréanne Larouche	4,446	10.72	-9.63
Green	Elisabeth Dionne	978	2.36	
Citoyens au pouvoir	Manon Gamache	247	0.6	
Voie du peuple	Marc Alarie	190	0.46	
Total valid votes		41,473	98.52	
Total rejected ballots		623	1.48	
Turnout		42,096	70.75	
Eligible voters		59,503		
Coalition Avenir Québec gain from Liberal		Swing		+18.39
Source(s) "Rapport des résultats officiels du scrutin". Élections Québec.

2014 Quebec general election
Party	Candidate	Votes	%	±%
Liberal	Pierre Paradis	18,103	44.50	+11.48
Coalition Avenir Québec	François Lemay	11,349	27.90	-4.40
Parti Québécois	René Beauregard	8,281	20.35	-5.11
Québec solidaire	Benoit Van Caloen	2,751	6.76	+2.12
Option nationale	Nicolas Pépin	199	0.49	-0.68
Total valid votes		40,683	98.49	
Total rejected ballots		623	1.51	
Turnout		41,306	73.13	
Eligible Voters		56,480	–	

2012 Quebec general election
Party	Candidate	Votes	%	±%
Liberal	Pierre Paradis	13,841	33.02	−16.22
Coalition Avenir Québec	Benoit Legault	13,538	32.30	+15.65
Parti Québécois	Richard Leclerc	10,670	25.46	−1.86
Québec solidaire	Benoit Van Caloen	1,944	4.64	+1.74
Green	Louise Martineau	724	1.73	−1.59
Option nationale	Patrick Melchior	490	1.17	–
Conservative	Jacques Pipon	253	0.60	–
Coalition pour la constituante	Dominique Favreau	184	0.44	–
Independent	Jean-Pierre Dufault	141	0.34	–
Independent	Gilles Alarie	127	0.30	–
Total valid votes		41,912	99.00	–
Total rejected ballots		425	1.00	–
Turnout		42,337	76.55	+16.16
Electors on the lists		55,304	–	–

2008 Quebec general election
Party	Candidate	Votes	%	±%
Liberal	Pierre Paradis	15,006	49.24	+9.39
Parti Québécois	Richard Leclerc	8,325	27.32	+6.98
Action démocratique	Mario Charpentier	5,073	16.65	−14.88
Green	Louise Martineau	1,012	3.32	−2.07
Québec solidaire	Diane Cormier	884	2.90	–
Independent	Jacques-Antoine Normandin	173	0.57	–
Total valid votes		30,473	100.00%	
Total rejected ballots		480	1.55%	
Turnout		30,953	60.39	−11.49
Eligible voters		51,255		
Source: Official Results, Le Directeur général des élections du Québec.

2007 Quebec general election
Party	Candidate	Votes	%	±%
Liberal	Pierre Paradis	14,182	39.85	−15.79
Action démocratique	Jean L'Écuyer	11,221	31.53	+13.48
Parti Québécois	Richard Leclerc	7,238	20.34	−3.94
Green	Vanessa Thibodeau	1,917	5.39	–
Québec solidaire	Lorraine Lasnier	1,032	2.90	+1.37
Total valid votes		35,590	100.00%	
Total rejected ballots		298	0.83%	
Turnout		35,888	71.88	+1.44
Eligible voters		49,928		
Source: Official Results, Le Directeur général des élections du Québec.

2003 Quebec general election
Party	Candidate	Votes	%	±%
Liberal	Pierre Paradis	18,546	55.64	-1.53
Parti Québécois	Lina Le Blanc	8,093	24.28	-6.59
Action démocratique	Pierre Plante	6,018	18.05	+6.70
UFP	Simon Gnocchini	509	1.53	–
Equality	Lionel Albert	167	0.50	–
Total valid votes		33,333	98.67	
Rejected and declined votes		448	1.33	
Turnout		33,781	70.44	
Electors on the lists		47,955		
Source: Official Results, Le Directeur général des élections du Québec.

1998 Quebec general election
Party	Candidate	Votes	%	±%
Liberal	Pierre Paradis	18,127	57.17	−3.95
Parti Québécois	Raôul Duguay	9,789	30.87	+1.07
Action démocratique	Eric Larivière	3,599	11.35	+4.58
Natural Law	Jean-Charles Rouleau	194	0.61	−0.30
Total valid votes		31,709	100.00%	
Total rejected ballots		258	0.82%	
Turnout		31,967	80.56	-3.51
Eligible voters		39,680		
Source: Official Results, Le Directeur général des élections du Québec.

1995 Quebec referendum
Side	Votes	%
Non	21,530	61.68
Oui	13,376	38.32

1994 Quebec general election
Party	Candidate	Votes	%	±%
Liberal	Pierre Paradis	18,402	61.12	+6.94
Parti Québécois	Marie-Paul Bourassa-Marois	8,972	29.80	+4.77
Action démocratique	Benoit Trudeau	2,037	6.77	–
Equality	Ross K. Ladd	423	1.40	−9.66
Natural Law	Jean Cérigo	274	0.91	–
Total valid votes		30,108	98.51	
Rejected and declined votes		456	1.49	
Turnout		30,564	84.07	+8.15
Electors on the lists		36,354		
Source: Official Results, Le Directeur général des élections du Québec.

1992 Charlottetown Accord referendum
Side	Votes	%
Non	16,271	55.85
Oui	12,861	44.15

1989 Quebec general election
Party	Candidate	Votes	%	±%
Liberal	Pierre Paradis	13,502	54.18	-14.65
Parti Québécois	Daniel Lavoie	6,238	25.03	-1.90
Unity	Graham Neil	2,756	11.06	–
Independent	Heather Keith-Ryan	1,936	7.77	–
Parti 51	Jean-Guy Péloquin	269	1.08	–
Independent	Robin Lawrance	137	0.55	–
Commonwealth of Canada	Maurice Boisclair	84	0.34	–
Total valid votes		24,922	98.01	
Total rejected ballots		507	1.99	
Turnout		25,429	75.92	
Eligible Voters		33,496		
Source: Official Results, Le Directeur général des élections du Québec.

1985 Quebec general election
Party	Candidate	Votes	%	±%
Liberal	Pierre Paradis	16,500	68.83	+6.26
Parti Québécois	Wilfrid Laroche	6,456	26.93	−4.71
New Democratic	Ron Marchand	880	3.67	–
Christian Socialist	André Paré	136	0.57	–
Total valid votes		23,972	100.00%	
Total rejected ballots		216	0.89%	
Turnout		24,188	74.47	−6.85
Eligible voters		32,479		
Source: Official Results, Le Directeur général des élections du Québec.

1981 Quebec general election
Party	Candidate	Votes	%	±%
Liberal	Pierre Paradis	15,832	62.57	+0.12
Parti Québécois	Marie Harvey	8,005	31.63	+3.57
Union Nationale	Jean-Guy Péloquin	1,178	4.66	-4.32
Freedom of Choice	Blair McIntosh	289	1.14	–
Total valid votes		25,304	100.00%	
Total rejected ballots		168	0.66%	
Turnout		25,472	81.32	+13.03
Eligible voters		31,325		
Source: Official Results, Le Directeur général des élections du Québec.

Quebec provincial by-election, November 17, 1980
Party	Candidate	Votes	%	±%
Liberal	Pierre Paradis	13,271	62.45	+38.85
Parti Québécois	Gérard Comptois	5,962	28.06	+7.40
Union Nationale	Pierre-Paul Ravenelle	1,909	8.98	−40.29
United Social Credit	Joseph Ranger	107	0.50	–
Total valid votes		21,249	100.00%	
Total rejected ballots		154	0.72	–
Turnout		21,403	68.29	−14.64
Eligible voters		31,342		
Source: Official Results, Le Directeur général des élections du Québec.

1980 Quebec referendum
Side	Votes	%
Non	20,012	74.03
Oui	7,022	25.97

1976 Quebec general election
Party	Candidate	Votes	%
Union Nationale	Armand Russell	11,380	49.27
Liberal	Glendon P. Brown	5,450	23.60
Parti Québécois	Gérard Comptois	4,772	20.66
Ralliement créditiste	Normand Chouinard	1,087	4.71
Parti national populaire	Jean-Gilles Chagnon	262	1.13
Independent	Foster Wightman	100	0.43
Independent	Maurice Juteau	47	0.20
Total valid votes		23,098	98.72
Rejected and declined votes		514	2.18
Turnout		23,612	82.93
Electors on the lists		28,473	
Source: Official Results, Le Directeur général des élections du Québec

1973 Quebec general election
Party	Candidate	Votes	%
Liberal	Glendon "Glen" Brown	12,999	62.02
Parti créditiste	Georges Binette	3,312	15.80
Parti Québécois	Paul Doucet	2,860	13.65
Union Nationale	Jean-Guy Choinière	1,587	7.57
Independent	Richard Paquette	202	0.96
Total valid votes		20,960	98.62
Rejected and declined votes		294	1.38
Turnout		21,254	78.27
Electors on the lists		27,153	
Source: Elections Quebec

== See also ==
- List of Quebec provincial electoral districts
- Canadian provincial electoral districts
