= Parti Québécois candidates in the 1989 Quebec provincial election =

The Parti Québécois fielded a full slate of 125 candidates in the 1989 Quebec general election. Twenty-nine of the party's candidates were elected, which allowed the party to retain its position as the official opposition in the National Assembly of Quebec.

== Electoral divisions ==
=== Brome—Missisquoi: Daniel Lavoie ===
Daniel Lavoie received 6,238 votes (25.03%), finishing second against Liberal Party incumbent Pierre Paradis.

Prior to the 1989 election, a newspaper report about factional infighting in the Union Nationale listed Daniel Lavoie as a party member. It is possible that this was the same person.

=== Jean-Talon: Martine Hébert ===
Martine Hébert received 12,272 votes (40.39%) for a second-place finish against Liberal Party incumbent Gil Rémillard. A candidate named Martine Hébert ran for Vision Montreal in the 2009 Montreal municipal election; it is not known if this was the same person.

=== Nicolet-Yamaska: Guy Vachon ===
Guy Vachon has been a candidate of both the Parti Québécois and the federal Parti nationaliste du Québec. In 1984, he identified as a teaching consultant.

In 1985, an individual named Guy Vachon was listed as both the regional director of the Parti Québécois for Trois-Rivières and the regional co-ordinator of Pierre-Marc Johnson's successful bid to become party leader. It is assumed that this is the same person as the political candidate.

Electoral record
Election	Division	Party	Votes	%	Place	Winner
1984 federal	Richelieu	Nationaliste	1,463	3.01	4/7	Louis Plamondon, Progressive Conservative
1989 provincial	Nicolet-Yamaska	Parti Québécois	8,941	35.46	2/3	Maurice Richard, Liberal

=== Richelieu: Guy Savard ===
Guy Savard is a veteran activist in the Quebec nationalist movement. He served as vice-president of a local Société Saint-Jean-Baptiste organization for many years and was president of the Parti Québécois in Richelieu before seeking public office. A 2003 journal article describes him as being on the hardcore sovereigntist wing of the party. He received 12,502 votes (42.25%) in 1989, finishing second against Liberal incumbent Albert Khelfa.
