= André Bourbeau =

Canadian politician

André Bourbeau CM CQ

Member of the National Assembly of Quebec for Laporte
- In office April 13, 1981 – April 14, 2003
- Preceded by: Pierre Marois
- Succeeded by: Michel Audet

Personal details
- Born: June 1, 1936 Verdun, Quebec, Canada
- Died: March 25, 2018 (aged 81) Dunham, Quebec, Canada
- Party: Liberal
- Relations: Monique Landry (sister); Jacques Miquelon (uncle)
- Education: University of Montreal; McGill University

André Bourbeau, CM CQ (June 1, 1936 – March 25, 2018) was a Canadian politician. A member of the Quebec Liberal Party, Bourbeau served as member of the National Assembly of Quebec for Laporte serving from 1981 until 2003.

== Early life ==
Bourbeau was born in Verdun, Quebec, the son of Louis-Auguste Bourbeau and Antoinette Miquelon. He studied at the Séminaire de Sherbrooke and the University of Montreal before receiving a Diploma in Law from McGill University in 1959.

== Political career ==
Bourbeau became a notary in 1960 and practiced in Montreal from 1960 to 1981. From 1970 to 1978, he served as a city councillor in Saint-Lambert, Quebec. He was mayor from 1978 to 1981.

In 1981, he was elected to the National Assembly of Quebec for Laporte. A Liberal, he was re-elected in 1985, 1989, 1994, and 1998. He did not run in 2003. He held many different cabinet positions including Minister of Municipal Affairs, Responsible for Housing; Minister of Manpower, Income Security and Vocational Training; and Minister of Finance.

He was the Chairman of the Board at Hydro-Québec from 2003 to 2005. From 1998 to 2003, he was Chairman of the Wilfrid Pelletier Foundation. As well, he was Chairman of the Jeunesses Musicales of Canada Foundation. Bourbeau was the founding president of the Montreal International Music Competition.

== Death ==
Bourbeau was diagnosed with cancer in 1998. He died of complications from cancer on March 25, 2018, at the age of 81.

== Honors ==
In 2009, he was made a Knight of the National Order of Quebec.

In December 2016, Bourbeau was named a Member of the Order of Canada.

== Electoral record (partial) ==
1985 Quebec general election: Laporte
| Party | Candidate | Votes | % |
|---|---|---|---|
| Liberal | André Bourbeau | 18,925 | 63.87 |
| Parti Québécois | Maurice Collette | 8,966 | 30.26 |
| New Democratic | Jean-François Fiset | 1,137 | 3.84 |
| Progressive Conservative | Thérèse Michaud L'Écuyer | 387 | 1.31 |
| Commonwealth of Canada | Alain Gauthier | 87 | 0.29 |
| Christian Socialist | Nicole Séguin | 68 | 0.23 |
| United Social Credit | Joseph Ranger | 62 | 0.21 |
| Total valid votes | | 29,632 | |
| Rejected and declined votes | | 531 | |
| Turnout | | 30,163 | 77.26 |
| Electors on the lists | | 39,039 | |
