= Party for the Commonwealth of Canada (Quebec) candidates in the 1989 Quebec provincial election =

The Party for the Commonwealth of Canada ran eleven candidates in the 1989 Quebec provincial election, none of whom were elected. Information about these candidates may be found on this page. The Commonwealth Party was the Canadian branch of Lyndon LaRouche's movement.

== Candidates ==
=== Brome—Missisquoi: Maurice Boisclair ===
Maurice Boisclair received 84 votes (0.34%), finishing seventh against Liberal Party incumbent Pierre Paradis.
