= Armand Russell =

Canadian politician

Member of the Legislative Assembly of Quebec for Shefford
- In office 1956–1973
- Preceded by: Gaston Ledoux
- Succeeded by: Richard Verreault

Member of the National Assembly of Quebec for Brome-Missisquoi
- In office 1976–1980
- Preceded by: Glendon Pettes Brown
- Succeeded by: Pierre Paradis

Personal details
- Born: June 23, 1921 Saint-Joachim-de-Shefford, Quebec
- Died: October 1, 2012 (aged 91) Waterloo, Quebec
- Party: Union Nationale

Armand Russell (June 23, 1921 – October 1, 2012) was a Canadian politician from Quebec.

== Background ==
He was born on June 23, 1921, in Saint-Joachim-de-Shefford, Quebec.

== Town politics ==
Russell served as City Councillor in 1949 and 1950 and as Mayor from 1950 to 1957 in Saint-Joachim-de-Shefford. He also served as Mayor of Waterloo, Quebec, from 1957 to 1967.

== Member of the legislature ==
He won a seat to the Legislative Assembly of Quebec in the 1956 election for the Union Nationale in the riding of Shefford. He was re-elected in the 1960, 1962 and 1966 elections.

== Cabinet Member ==
Russell was appointed to the Cabinet, serving as Minister responsible for Public Works from 1966 to 1967 and Minister of Public Works from 1967 to 1970. He was re-elected in the 1970 election, but was defeated in 1973 election.

== Political comeback ==
Russell was re-elected in the riding of Brome-Missisquoi in the 1976 election.

== Federal politics ==
He resigned to run as a Progressive Conservative in 1980 election in the riding of Shefford. He lost against Liberal candidate Jean Lapierre.

== Electoral record ==
1980 Canadian federal election: Shefford
| Party | Candidate | Votes | % | ±% |
|---|---|---|---|---|
| Liberal | Jean Lapierre | 32,449 | 68.47 | +17.00 |
| Progressive Conservative | Armand Russell | 9,837 | 20.76 | -2.79 |
| New Democratic | Denis Boissé | 3,701 | 7.81 | +5.76 |
| Rhinoceros | Cornélius André Brazeau | 1,274 | 2.69 | +1.12 |
| Marxist–Leninist | Gilles Davignon | 129 | 0.27 | |
| Total valid votes | | 47,390 | 100.00 | |

1976 Quebec general election: Brome-Missisquoi
| Party | Candidate | Votes | % |
|---|---|---|---|
| Union Nationale | Armand Russell | 11,380 | 49.27 |
| Liberal | Glendon P. Brown | 5,450 | 23.60 |
| Parti Québécois | Gérard Comptois | 4,772 | 20.66 |
| Ralliement créditiste | Normand Chouinard | 1,087 | 4.71 |
| Parti national populaire | Jean-Gilles Chagnon | 262 | 1.13 |
| Independent | Foster Wightman | 100 | 0.43 |
| Independent | Maurice Juteau | 47 | 0.20 |
| Total valid votes | | 23,098 | 98.72 |
| Rejected and declined votes | | 514 | 2.18 |
| Turnout | | 23,612 | 82.93 |
| Electors on the lists | | 28,473 | |
Source: Official Results, Le Directeur général des élections du Québec
