= Unity Party of Quebec candidates in the 1989 Quebec provincial election =

The Unity Party of Quebec fielded sixteen candidates in the 1989 Quebec provincial election, none of whom were elected. Information about these candidates may be found on this page.

== Candidates ==
=== Brome—Missisquoi: Graham Neil ===
Graham Neil became a professor of Physical Education at McGill University in 1970 and held this position into the 2000s. A 2010 publication of the Association of Physical Educators of Quebec lists him as retired. He lived in Stanbridge East at the time of the election.

Like others in his party, Neil strongly opposed the Government of Quebec's decision in 1988 to restrict usage of the English language on signs and billboards, notwithstanding a Supreme Court of Canada decision against such restrictions. He was quoted as saying that "basic human rights [had] been violated in the language of signs," and that the government of Robert Bourassa had "simply ignored people's feelings." Neil received 2,756 votes (11.06%) on election day, finishing third against Liberal incumbent Pierre Paradis.
