= New Democratic Party of Quebec candidates in the 1985 Quebec provincial election =

The New Democratic Party of Quebec fielded ninety candidates in the 1985 Quebec provincial election, none of whom were elected. Information about these candidates may be found on this page.

== Electoral divisions ==
(n.c.: no candidate)

| Riding | Candidate's name | Gender | Occupation | Votes | % | Rank | Notes |
|---|---|---|---|---|---|---|---|
| Abitibi-Est | Pierre Nantel | M | | 372 | 2.09 | 4th | |
| Abitibi-Ouest | Claude Bourque | M | | 426 | 2.14 | 3rd | |
| Anjou | Claire Brassard | F | | 977 | 2.92 | 3rd | |
| Argenteuil | n.c. | | | | | | |
| Arthabaska | Marcel Chalifoux | M | | 801 | 2.40 | 4th | |
| Beauce-Nord | n.c. | | | | | | |
| Beauce-Sud | n.c. | | | | | | |
| Beauharnois | n.c. | | | | | | |
| Bellechasse | n.c. | | | | | | |
| Berthier | n.c. | | | | | | |
| Bertrand | Claire Bonneville | F | | 586 | 1.67 | 3rd | |
| Bonaventure | n.c. | | | | | | |
| Bourassa | Robert Desfossés | M | | 651 | 2.45 | 3rd | |
| Bourget | Pierre Bourgeois | M | | 554 | 2.18 | 3rd | |
| Brome—Missisquoi | Ron Marchand | M | | 880 | 3.67 | 3rd | |
| Chambly | Frédéric Henderson | M | | 1,096 | 3.67 | 3rd | |
| Champlain | Jean-Claude Landry | M | | 1,269 | 3.95 | 3rd | |
| Chapleau | Jean-Philippe Rheault | M | | 686 | 2.51 | 3rd | |
| Charlesbourg | Diane Lapointe | F | | 1,740 | 4.93 | 4th | |
| Charlevoix | Robert Vigneault | M | | 634 | 2.61 | 3rd | |
| Châteauguay | Ronald L. Taylor | M | | 948 | 2.54 | 3rd | |
| Chauveau | Céline Charbonneau | F | | 1,720 | 5.05 | 3rd | |
| Chicoutimi | Normand Letendre | M | | 1,429 | 4.34 | 3rd | |
| Chomedey | Norman Buchbinder | M | | 799 | 2.68 | 3rd | |
| Crémazie | Pierre Leduc | M | | 765 | 2.37 | 3rd | |
| D'Arcy-McGee | Heather Yampolsky | F | | 937 | 3.76 | 3rd | |
| Deux-Montagnes | Roger Lemoine | M | | 490 | 1.60 | 4th | |
| Dorion | Paul Comtois | M | Economist | 653 | 2.65 | 3rd | |
Notes: Paul Comtois was a federal and provincial New Democratic Party candidate in the mid-1980s. He was forty-two years old in 1985, worked as an economist in the Quebec government's labour department, and said that he was aiming for a second-place finish. Electoral record: Election / Division / Party / Votes / % / Place / Winner; 1984 federal / Papineau / New Democratic / 4,295 / 13.13 / 3/9 / André Ouellet, Liberal; 1985 provincial / Dorion / New Democratic / 653 / 2.65 / 3/11 / Violette Trépanier, Liberal
| Drummond | Michel Parenteau | M | | 585 | 1.69 | 4th | Future party leader 1990-1992 |
| Dubuc | Hélène Bouchard | F | | 950 | 3.71 | 3rd | |
| Duplessis | n.c. | | | | | | |
| Fabre | Louis Roy | M | | 668 | 2.27 | 3rd | |
| Frontenac | n.c. | | | | | | |
| Gaspé | n.c. | | | | | | |
| Gatineau | Luc Villemaire | M | | 532 | 2.56 | 4th | |
| Gouin | Jacques Desrosiers | M | | 665 | 2.87 | 3rd | |
| Groulx | n.c. | | | | | | |
| Hull | Serge Bernier | M | | 1,016 | 3.79 | 3rd | |
| Huntingdon | n.c. | | | | | | |
| Iberville | Joseph Salvo Rossi | M | | 495 | 1.48 | 4th | |
| Îles-de-la-Madeleine | n.c. | | | | | | |
| Jacques-Cartier | James McCarte | M | | 1,025 | 3.40 | 3rd | |
| Jeanne-Mance | Vincent Guadagnano | M | | 411 | 1.39 | 4th | |
| Jean-Talon | Jan Warnke | M | | 1,727 | 5.48 | 3rd | |
| Johnson | n.c. | | | | | | |
| Joliette | n.c. | | | | | | |
| Jonquière | Maurice Bilodeau | M | | 1,784 | 5.28 | 3rd | |
| Kamouraska-Témiscouata | n.c. | | | | | | |
| Labelle | n.c. | | | | | | |
| L'Acadie | Charles Suissa | M | | 946 | 3.10 | 3rd | |
| Lac-Saint-Jean | Jean-Claude Martel | M | | 1,072 | 3.45 | 3rd | |
| Lafontaine | Roger Vincent | M | | 608 | 1.57 | 3rd | |
| La Peltrie | Denis Jeffrey | M | | 1,968 | 5.55 | 3rd | |
| Laporte | Jean-François Fiset | M | | 1,137 | 3.84 | 3rd | |
| Laprairie | Diane Allard | F | | 1,088 | 2.65 | 3rd | |
| L'Assomption | n.c. | | | | | | |
| Laurier | Ioannis Kourtesis | M | | 830 | 3.41 | 3rd | |
| Laval-des-Rapides | Denis Labelle | M | | 704 | 2.41 | 3rd | |
| Laviolette | n.c. | | | | | | |
| Lévis | Michel Carbonneau | M | | 1,154 | 2.76 | 3rd | |
| Limoilou | Guy Berthe | M | | 949 | 3.41 | 3rd | |
| Lotbinière | n.c. | | | | | | |
| Louis-Hébert | Jean-Paul Harney | M | Professor | 2,798 | 8.59 | 3rd | Party leader 1984-1987 |
| Maisonneuve | Milan Mirich | M | | 495 | 2.07 | 3rd | See the 2000 federal election for biographical notes. |
| Marguerite-Bourgeoys | John Commins | M | | 795 | 3.00 | 3rd | |
| Marie-Victorin | François Desgroseillers | M | | 884 | 3.36 | 3rd | |
| Marquette | Marie Gauthier | M | | 419 | 1.90 | 3rd | |
| Maskinongé | n.c. | | | | | | |
| Matane | n.c. | | | | | | |
| Matapédia | n.c. | | | | | | |
| Mégantic-Compton | Joseph Lemoine | M | | 594 | 2.75 | 3rd | |
| Mercier | Roger Couvrette | M | | 1,200 | 4.69 | 3rd | |
| Mille-Îles | George Hanna | M | | 573 | 1.92 | 3rd | |
| Montmagny-L'Islet | Louise Saint-Pierre | F | | 564 | 2.35 | 3rd | |
| Montmorency | Michael Haberman | M | | 1,200 | 3.38 | 4th | |
| Mont-Royal | Terrence Jones | M | | 675 | 2.99 | 3rd | |
| Nelligan | Joan Eyolfson Cadham | F | Writer | 1,123 | 3.51 | 3rd | |
Notes: Joan Eyolfson Cadham was raised in Saskatchewan. She studied journalism at Ryerson Institute of Technology. She lived in Sainte-Anne-de-Bellevue. She wrote for boating magazines. She moved back to Saskatchewan in 1992.
| Nicolet | Normande Villeneuve | F | | 425 | 1.59 | 3rd | |
| Notre-Dame-de-Grâce | Michel Agnaieff | M | Trade unionist | 2,333 | 8.64 | 3rd | Associate president of the federal NDP |
Notes: Michel Agnaieff was born in 1939 in Cairo, Egypt. His father was of Russian origin. He emigrated from Egypt to Canada in 1966. He studied linguistics at Université de Montréal. He was the founding president of the Conseil québécois pour la paix. In 1971, he became secretary of the Centrale de l'enseignement du Québec (CEQ). From 1976 to 1996, he was the general manager of the CEQ. He was elected associate president of the federal New Democratic Party. He was the NDP candidate in the riding of Duvernay in the 1988 federal election, receiving 14.81% of the votes and finishing third. It was revealed in the press that he had been placed under surveillance by the Canadian Intelligence Services, who suspected him of promoting soviet influence. He later became a federal civil servant at the Canadian International Development Agency. From 1998 to 2002, he was president of the Canadian Commission for UNESCO.
| Orford | Denis Boissé | M | | 632 | 2.25 | 4th | |
| Outremont | René Denis | M | | 1,294 | 5.44 | 3rd | |
| Papineau | Gaétan Ménard | M | | 732 | 3.44 | 3rd | |
| Pontiac | Michel Martin | M | | 896 | 4.65 | 3rd | |
| Portneuf | Gilles Harvey | M | | 726 | 2.73 | 3rd | |
| Prévost | n.c. | | | | | | |
| Richelieu | Guy Verville | M | | 587 | 1.91 | 3rd | |
Notes: Guy Verville was a federal and provincial New Democratic Party candidate in the mid-1980s. He listed himself as a student in 1984. Electoral record: Election / Division / Party / Votes / % / Place / Winner; 1984 federal / Témiscamingue / New Democratic / 2,189 / 5.40 / 3/6 / Gabriel Desjardins, Progressive Conservative; 1985 provincial / Richelieu / New Democratic / 587 / 1.91 / 3/6 / Albert Khelfa, Liberal
| Richmond | n.c. | | | | | | |
| Rimouski | n.c. | | | | | | |
| Rivière-du-Loup | Marius Tremblay | M | | 711 | 3.24 | 3rd | |
| Robert-Baldwin | René Boulard | M | | 1,068 | 3.18 | 3rd | |
| Roberval | n.c. | | | | | | |
| Rosemont | Roger Lamarre | M | | 742 | 2.64 | 3rd | |
| Rousseau | n.c. | | | | | | |
| Rouyn-Noranda–Témiscamingue | n.c. | | | | | | |
| Saguenay | Jocelyn Toulouse | M | | 516 | 2.21 | 3rd | |
| Sainte-Anne | Kurtis Law | M | | 633 | 3.07 | 3rd | |
| Saint-François | Sarah Johnson | F | | 1,220 | 4.22 | 3rd | |
| Saint-Henri | Alain Giguère | M | | 602 | 2.33 | 3rd | |
| Saint-Hyacinthe | Roland Morin | M | | 709 | 2.25 | 3rd | |
Notes: Roland Morin became a member of the NDP in 1963. He was a NDP candidate in the federal elections of 1965 (in Maisonneuve-Rosemont), 1968 (in Maisonneuve), 1972 (in Notre-Dame-de-Grâce) and 1974 (in Notre-Dame-de-Grâce). He is listed as publicist, trade unionist and translator. and a NDPQ candidate in the 1970 and 1985 provincial elections. He was the president of the NDPQ (section) in 1967-1970. On 21 March 1970, he succeeded Robert Cliche as leader of the NDPQ (section). He was succeeded by G.-Raymond Laliberté in 1971. Morin was the president of the NDPQ (party) in 1985-1987. After Jean-Paul Harney announced that he would not be candidate for leadership for a new term, Morin was elected leader of the NDPQ (party) at the NDPQ convention on 29 October 1987. During his term as leader, Morin was the NDPQ candidate in the 20 June 1988 provincial by-election in Anjou, where he finished with 483 votes (2.24%). At the 30 April 1989 NPDQ convention, he was candidate for a new term as leader but he was defeated by Gaétan Nadeau.
| Saint-Jacques | Pierre Graveline | M | Trade unionist | 1,115 | 5.08 | 3rd | |
Notes: Pierre Graveline was born in 1952. He was journalist, employee of the Confédération des syndicats nationaux, director of communications at the Centrale de l'enseignement du Québec and columnist at Le Devoir. From 1996 to 2005, he was the general manager of the groupe Ville-Marie Littérature publishing house (Québecor Média). In 2007, he became associate publisher at Fides. He has written poetry and essays, including Prenons la parole ! (1991), Une planète nommée Québec (1996) and Une histoire de l'éducation et du syndicalisme enseignant au Québec (2003), Une passion littéraire (2009) and La liberté du Québec (2011).
| Saint-Jean | Philippe Thibodeau | M | | 1,028 | 3.03 | 3rd | |
| Saint-Laurent | Sid Ingerman | M | | 1,037 | 3.42 | 3rd | |
| Saint-Louis | Arden Ryshpan | M | | 1,405 | 6.87 | 4th | |
| Sainte-Marie | Louise Boucher | F | | 711 | 3.77 | 3rd | |
| Saint-Maurice | n.c. | | | | | | |
| Sauvé | Yves Alavo | M | | 462 | 1.80 | 3rd | |
| Shefford | Nancy Pearson | F | | 284 | 0.86 | 3rd | |
| Sherbrooke | n.c. | | | | | | |
| Taillon | Jean-Serge Baribeau | M | | 791 | 2.64 | 3rd | |
Notes: Jean-Serge Baribeau is a sociologist. He was a professor of sociology for almost 40 years in a private college and in CEGEP Édouard-Montpetit. He describes himself as a sociologist of the media.
| Taschereau | Pierre Rivard | M | Student | 1,217 | 5.65 | 3rd | NDP Youth president |
| Terrebonne | Johanne Morin | F | | 810 | 2.47 | 3rd | |
| Trois-Rivières | Jocelyn Ann Leblanc-Girard | F | | 614 | 2.10 | 3rd | |
| Ungava | n.c. | | | | | | |
| Vachon | Michael Kukura Jr | M | | 673 | 2.08 | 3rd | |
| Vanier | Maurice Gagnon | M | | 1,671 | 5.50 | 3rd | |
| Vaudreuil-Soulanges | Marc Turgeon | M | | 924 | 2.54 | 3rd | |
| Verchères | Lise Lamarche | F | | 1,063 | 3.13 | 3rd | |
| Verdun | Richard Proulx | M | | 659 | 2.85 | 3rd | |
| Viau | Giuseppe Sciortino | M | Lawyer | 864 | 3.34 | 3rd | |
| Viger | Renée Sigouin | F | | 617 | 2.10 | 3rd | |
| Vimont | Jean Desrosiers | M | | 854 | 2.64 | 3rd | |
| Westmount | Greta Nemiroff | F | | 1,916 | 7.94 | 3rd | |
