= Sainte-Sabine, Montérégie, Quebec =

Sainte-Sabine
- Municipality
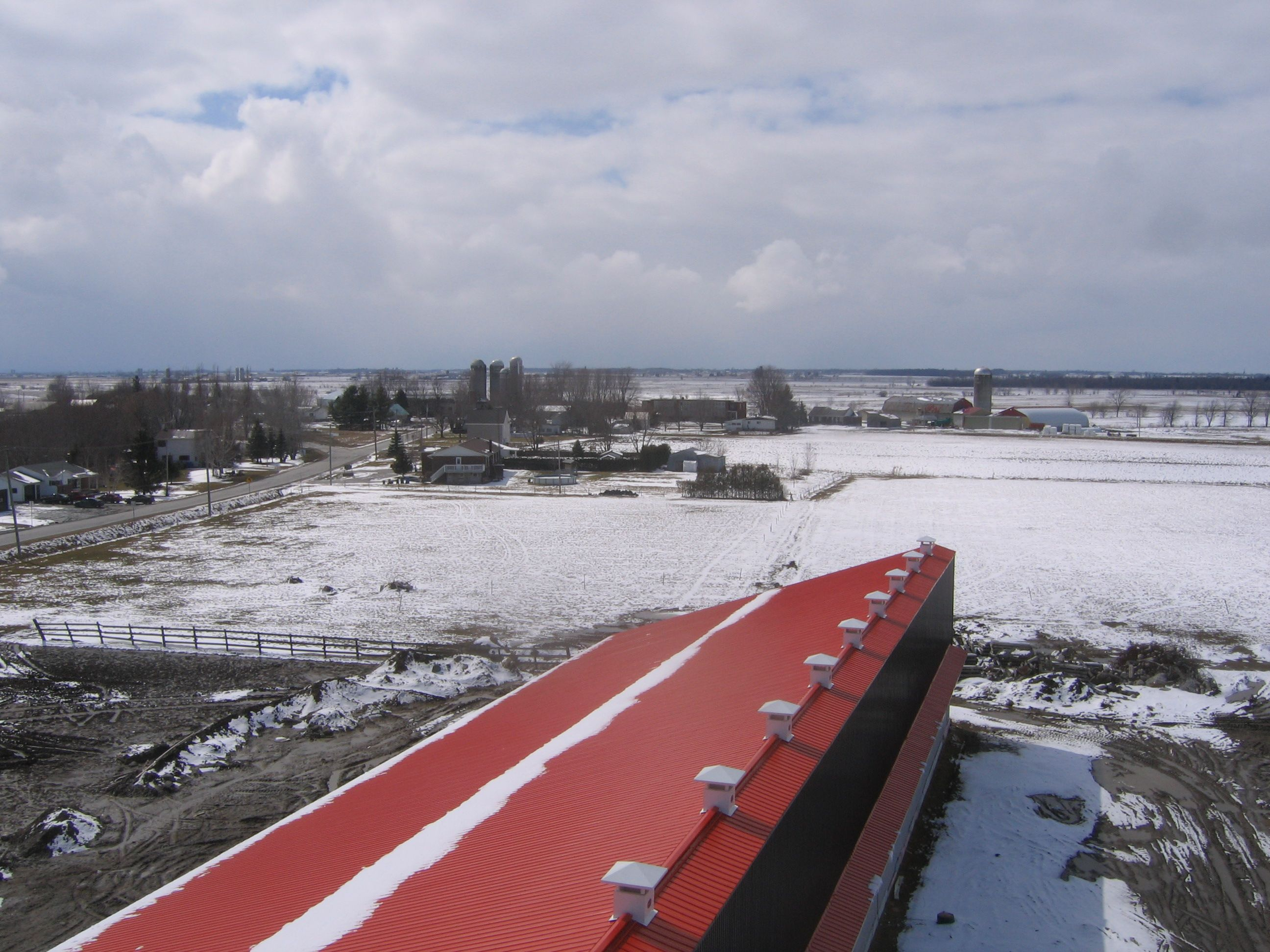

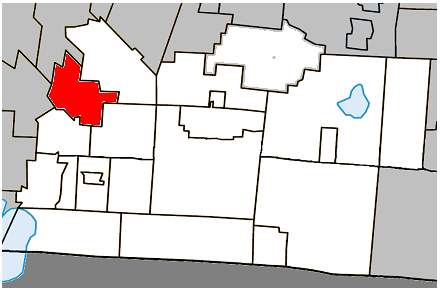
- Location within Brome-Missisquoi RCM

- Location in southern Quebec
- Coordinates: 45°14′N 73°01′W
- Country: Canada
- Province: Quebec
- Region: Montérégie
- RCM: Brome-Missisquoi
- Constituted: March 19, 1921

Government
  - Mayor: Laurent Phoenix
  - Federal riding: Brome—Missisquoi
  - Prov. riding: Brome-Missisquoi

Area
  - Total: 55.40 km^{2} (21.39 sq mi)
  - Land: 55.16 km^{2} (21.30 sq mi)

Population (2011)
  - Total: 1,120
  - Density: 20.3/km^{2} (53/sq mi)
  - Pop 2006-2011: ▲6.4%
  - Dwellings: 404
- Time zone: UTC−5 (EST)
  - Summer (DST): UTC−4 (EDT)
- Postal code(s): J0J 2B0
- Area codes: 450 and 579
- Highways: R-235
- Website: www.saintesabine.ca

Sainte-Sabine (French pronunciation: [sɛ̃t sabin]) is a municipality in the Canadian province of Quebec, located within the Brome-Missisquoi Regional County Municipality. The population as of the Canada 2011 Census was 1,120.

== Demographics ==
=== Population ===
Population trend

Census	Population	Change (%)
2011	1,120	▲6.4%
2006	1,053	▲0.4%
2001	1,049	▲1.3%
1996	1,036	▲3.3%
1991	1,003	N/A

=== Language ===
Mother tongue language (2006)

Language	Population	Pct (%)
French only	880	84.62%
English only	135	12.98%
Both English and French	0	0.00%
Other languages	25	2.40%

== See also ==
- List of municipalities in Quebec
