= Ministry of Labour (Quebec) =

Ministry of the government of Quebec

The Ministry of Labour (in French: Ministère du Travail) is responsible for labour relations and regulations in the province of Quebec.

The Ministry was founded in 1905 as the Ministry of Public Works and Labour (Ministère des Travaux publics et du Travail). Following minister François Blais's promotion to Education Minister in 2015, the Ministry was merged with the Ministry of Employment and Social Solidarity on February 27, 2015. The ministry has now become a secretariat.

The current minister of labour is Jean Boulet.
