= Louise Roy (administrator) =

Louise Roy OC OQ (born 1947 in Quebec City) is an administrator in Quebec, Canada. She was the chancellor of the Université de Montréal as well as Chairman of the university.

== Education ==
She holds a B.S. in Sociology from the University of Montreal (1971); a Masters of Science from the University of Wisconsin (1972); and a PhD in Sociology, also from the University of Wisconsin (1974).

== Career ==
Her career has included positions in academia, government, and private industry. She was a professor at the Université de Montréal from 1978 to 1981. Prior to 1985, she held various jobs in government. From 1985 to 1992 she was president of the Societé de transport de la communauté urbaine de Montréal, predecessor to today's Société de transport de Montréal. In 1992–93, she was vice-president of the La Laurentienne group, a banking and insurance company, which was sold in 1993 to Groupe Desjardins. From 1994 to 1997, she was executive vice-president of Air France in Paris. From 1997 to 2000, she was president and CEO of Télémédia Communications. From 2000 to 2003 she was senior vice-president of IATA. Since 2003, she has been a fellow at CIRANO. Since September 2006, she has been president of the Conseil des arts de Montréal. In October 2008, she became chancellor of the Université de Montréal. She also sits on several corporate boards of directors.

== Recognition ==
- In 2009, she was named an officer of the National Order of Quebec.
- In 2012, she was named an officer of the Order of Canada.
- In 2018, she was named a commander of the Order of Montreal.
