= 1981 Quebec general election =

Canadian provincial election

- April 13, 1981

122 seats in the 32nd National Assembly of Quebec 62 seats were needed for a majority
- Turnout: 82.52% (▼2.75%)
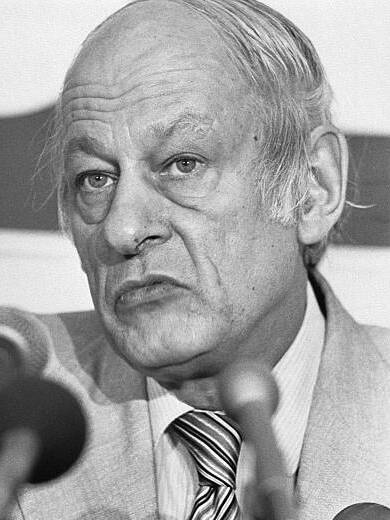

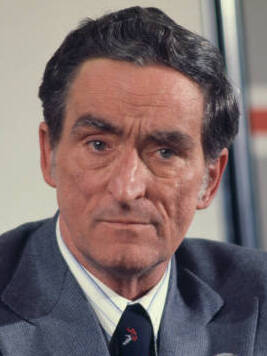
	First party	Second party	Third party
			UN
Leader	René Lévesque	Claude Ryan	Roch La Salle
Party	Parti Québécois	Liberal	Union Nationale
Leader since	October 14, 1968	April 15, 1978	January 9, 1981
Leader's seat	Taillon	Argenteuil	Ran in Berthier (lost)
Last election	71 seats, 41.37%	26 seats, 33.78%	11 seats, 18.20%
Seats won	80	42	0
Seat change	▲9	▲16	▼11
Popular vote	1,773,237	1,658,753	144,070
Percentage	49.26%	46.07%	4.00%
Swing	▲7.89%	▲12.29%	▼14.20%
- Popular vote by riding. As this is an FPTP election, seat totals are not determined by popular vote, but instead via results by each riding. Click the map for more details.
Premier before election
René Lévesque
Parti Québécois
Premier after election
René Lévesque
Parti Québécois

The 1981 Quebec general election was held on April 13, 1981, to elect members of the National Assembly of the Province of Quebec, Canada. The incumbent Parti Québécois, led by Premier René Lévesque, won re-election, defeating the Quebec Liberal Party, led by Claude Ryan.

The PQ won re-election despite having lost the 1980 Quebec referendum on sovereignty-association, the party's proposal for political independence for Quebec in an economic union with the rest of Canada. To some extent, they were helped by Claude Ryan's old-fashioned campaign style: he refused to tailor sound bites for the evening news and ran a campaign generally unsuited for television coverage. Despite finishing only three per cent behind the PQ, the Liberals still finished a distant second, with 42 seats to the PQ's 80. Historically, provincial elections in Quebec produce large disparities between the popular vote and the actual seat count.

The Union Nationale, which had won 11 seats in a modest comeback in the 1976 general election, was reduced to five seats at dissolution by numerous floor crossings, retirements and resignations. Among the departures was that of its leader in the 1976 election, Rodrigue Biron, who crossed the floor to the PQ. The once-proud party lost all of its remaining seats, never to return. The party essentially ended at this point, though it lingered in desultory fashion until 1989.

Parti Québécois received its highest ever result with 49.26% of the vote.

== Redistribution of ridings ==
A 1979 Act provided for the creation of the Commission de la représentation électorale, charged with the task of the redistribution of riding boundaries for elections to the National Assembly. For its initial work, it had to create a sufficient number of ridings that would have an average of 34,000 electors. In April 1980, the Commission increased the number of electoral districts from 110 to 122, effective with the next election:

Abolished ridings	New ridings
Drawn from parts of other ridings
	Bertrand (Note: from parts of Chambly and Verchères)
	Chapleau (Note: from parts of Papineau)
	Groulx (Note: from parts of Terrebonne)
	La Peltrie (Note: from part of Chauveau)
	Marquette (Note: from parts of Notre-Dame-de-Grâce, Marguerite-Bourgeoys and Jacques-Cartier)
	Ungava (Note: from parts of Abitibi-Est and Abitibi-Ouest)
	Viger (Note: from parts of Viau and Jeanne-Mance)
Reorganization of ridings
Fabre; Laval; Mille-Îles	Fabre; Mille-Îles; Chomedey; Laval-des-Rapides; Vimont
Pontiac-Témiscamingue; Rouyn-Noranda	Pontiac; Rouyn-Noranda–Témiscamingue
Division of ridings
Joliette-Montcalm	Joliette; Rousseau
Taillon	Taillon; Marie-Victorin; Vachon
Renaming of ridings
Nicolet-Yamaska	Nicolet
Laurentides-Labelle	Labelle
Pointe-Claire	Nelligan

== Campaign ==
The Liberals and péquistes fielded full slates, while the Unionists decided not to run a candidate in the new riding of Ungava. The Parti national populaire ceased operations after its co-founder and only MNA Fabien Roy decided to leave the Legislature in 1979 for the federal level to lead the Social Credit Party of Canada.

The Ralliement créditiste dissolved in 1978 when its leader Camil Samson created Les Démocrates, but that party failed to secure enough nominations for the coming election and thus dissolved in 1980. Samson would later join the Liberals, and would run as a candidate for that party in Rouyn-Noranda–Témiscamingue.

Other disaffected créditistes opted to join the United Social Credit which had been revived by Jean-Paul Poulin.

Riding contests, by number of candidates (1981)
Candidates	PQ	Lib	UN	Ind	Comm-W	FOC	Ltn	ML	PCSU	Workers	Comm	LSO	Total
2	1	1											2
3	48	48	48										144
4	35	35	35	7	5	2	1	13	5		2		140
5	14	14	14	4	5	5	6	5	2		1		70
6	11	11	11	4	10	3	1	9	1	3	1	1	66
7	6	6	6	3	6			6	3	3	2	1	42
8	4	4	4	4	4			4	4	3	1		32
9	1	1	1	1	1	1	1	1			1		9
10	2	2	2	4	2	1	1	2	1	1	2		20
Total	122	122	121	27	33	12	10	40	16	10	10	2	525

=== Polling by Language ===
Date(s)	Firm	Sample	Quebec Liberal Party			Parti Québécois			National Union			Other			Ref.
Date(s)	Firm	Sample	Francophones	Anglophones	Allophones	Francophones	Anglophones	Allophones	Francophones	Anglophones	Allophones	Francophones	Anglophones	Allophones	Ref.
April 5, 1981	Sorecom		35%	86%	59%	60%	14%	26%	5%	0%	0%	0%	0%	0%	HTML
March 22, 1981	Sorecom		36%	81%	84%	57%	16%	16%	7%	1%	0%	0%	1%	0%	HTML
August 25, 1980	Sorecom		40%	85%	62%	54%	1%	15%	6%	0%	2%	0%	0%	0%	HTML

== Results ==
All seats were won by either the PQ or the Liberals, and no other party received better than a third-place result. The UN was once more shut out of the National Assembly. The election was notable for a large number of fringe parties, none of which received as much as 0.2% of the popular vote.

Elections to the National Assembly of Quebec (1981)
Political party	Party leader	MNAs				Votes			
Political party	Party leader	Candidates	1976	1981	±	#	±	%	± (pp)
Parti Québécois	René Lévesque	122	71	80	9▲	1,773,237	382,886▲	49.26%	7.89▲
Liberal	Claude Ryan	122	26	42	16▲	1,658,753	523,697▲	46.08%	12.30▲
Union Nationale	Roch La Salle	121	11	–	11▼	144,070	467,596▼	4.00%	14.20▼
Independent		27	–	–	–	4,372	8,612▼	0.12%	0.27▼
Workers' Communist	Roger Rashi	33	–	–	–	4,956	4,956▲	0.14%	New
Freedom of Choice	Duncan McDonald	12	–	–	–	4,955	4,955▲	0.14%	New
Libertarian	Victor Levis	10	–	–	–	3,299	3,299▲	0.09%	New
Marxist–Leninist	Robert Verrier	40	–	–	–	3,178	3,178▲	0.09%	New
United Social Credit (Note: successor to the Ralliement créditiste)	Jean-Paul Poulin	16	–	–	–	1,284	154,167▼	0.04%	4.59▼
Workers		10	–	–	–	1,027	222▼	0.03%	0.01▼
Communist	Sam Walsh	10	–	–	–	768	1,008▼	0.02%	0.03▼
Socialist-Workers		2	–	–	–	198	110▲	0.01%	0.01▲
Total		525	110	122		3,600,097		100.00%	
Rejected ballots						38,523	31,923▼		
Voter turnout						3,638,620	207,668▲	82.52	2.75▼
Registered electors						4,409,276	385,533▲		

=== Vote and seat summaries ===
Ternary plots - shift of electoral support (1976-1981)
1976

1981
Electoral districts identified by colours of winning parties

Seats and popular vote by party
Party	Seats	Votes	Change (pp)
█ Parti Québécois	80 / 122	49.26%	7.89
█ Liberal	42 / 122	46.08%	12.03
█ Union Nationale	0 / 122	4.00%	-14.20
█ United Social Credit	0 / 122	0.04%	-4.59
█ Parti national populaire	0 / 122	0.00%	-0.92
█ Independent	0 / 122	0.12%	-0.27
█ Other	0 / 122	0.71%	0.06

=== Synopsis of results ===
Results by riding - 1981 Quebec general election
Riding	Winning party						Turnout (Note: including spoilt ballots)	Votes					
Name	1976	Party	Votes	Share	Margin #	Margin %	Turnout	PQ	Lib	UN	Ind	Oth	Total
Abitibi-Est	PQ	PQ	13,790	62.57%	7,198	32.66%	74.62%	13,790	6,592	1,658	–	–	22,040
Abitibi-Ouest	PQ	PQ	16,033	65.14%	8,384	34.06%	79.41%	16,033	7,649	932	–	–	24,614
Anjou	PQ	PQ	20,355	56.81%	5,420	15.13%	85.54%	20,355	14,935	543	–	–	35,833
Argenteuil	Lib	Lib	15,895	57.23%	4,996	17.99%	81.92%	10,899	15,895	778	–	200	27,772
Arthabaska	PQ	PQ	18,424	53.64%	5,304	15.44%	85.50%	18,424	13,120	2,623	–	180	34,347
Beauce-Nord	PQ	PQ	18,858	53.39%	4,828	13.67%	85.25%	18,858	14,030	2,433	–	–	35,321
Beauce-Sud	PNP	Lib	13,393	46.89%	97	0.34%	82.95%	13,296	13,393	1,519	357	–	28,565
Beauharnois	PQ	PQ	18,741	54.01%	4,120	11.87%	86.95%	18,741	14,621	970	–	370	34,702
Bellechasse	UN	PQ	9,194	37.58%	364	1.49%	82.56%	9,194	8,830	6,440	–	–	24,464
Berthier	PQ	Lib	10,676	37.34%	1,222	4.27%	85.41%	9,454	10,676	8,461	–	–	28,591
Bertrand	New	PQ	19,091	60.44%	7,405	23.44%	88.74%	19,091	11,686	810	–	–	31,587
Bonaventure	Lib	Lib	11,609	53.95%	2,133	9.91%	79.39%	9,476	11,609	432	–	–	21,517
Bourassa	PQ	PQ	15,597	50.37%	923	2.98%	83.81%	15,597	14,674	571	–	124	30,966
Bourget	PQ	PQ	15,810	56.07%	4,254	15.09%	84.82%	15,810	11,556	588	45	200	28,199
Brome-Missisquoi	UN	Lib	15,832	62.57%	7,827	30.93%	81.32%	8,005	15,832	1,178	–	289	25,304
Chambly	PQ	PQ	15,189	51.39%	1,645	5.57%	87.93%	15,189	13,544	752	–	70	29,555
Champlain	PQ	PQ	17,789	53.57%	4,937	14.87%	84.64%	17,789	12,852	2,462	–	101	33,204
Chapleau	New	Lib	15,364	53.44%	2,484	8.64%	76.41%	12,880	15,364	413	–	95	28,752
Charlesbourg	PQ	PQ	19,884	57.32%	5,998	17.29%	85.98%	19,884	13,886	762	–	155	34,687
Charlevoix	Lib	Lib	12,712	50.65%	799	3.18%	84.32%	11,913	12,712	473	–	–	25,098
Châteauguay	PQ	PQ	18,855	51.45%	1,778	4.85%	86.68%	18,855	17,077	574	140	–	36,646
Chauveau	PQ	PQ	18,991	55.97%	4,918	14.49%	82.93%	18,991	14,073	866	–	–	33,930
Chicoutimi	PQ	PQ	24,456	73.91%	16,632	50.26%	80.13%	24,456	7,824	811	–	–	33,091
Chomedey	New	Lib	20,933	66.24%	10,808	34.20%	83.72%	10,125	20,933	543	–	–	31,601
Crémazie	PQ	PQ	16,938	51.46%	1,583	4.81%	85.85%	16,938	15,355	545	–	80	32,918
D'Arcy-McGee	Lib	Lib	26,064	91.96%	24,532	86.56%	78.53%	1,532	26,064	111	–	635	28,342
Deux-Montagnes	PQ	PQ	16,149	53.00%	2,830	9.29%	85.83%	16,149	13,319	767	104	133	30,472
Dorion	PQ	PQ	14,551	51.54%	1,894	6.71%	82.58%	14,551	12,657	524	74	429	28,235
Drummond	PQ	PQ	19,359	55.31%	5,911	16.89%	84.44%	19,359	13,448	2,099	–	95	35,001
Dubuc	PQ	PQ	16,630	64.64%	8,296	32.25%	82.30%	16,630	8,334	762	–	–	25,726
Duplessis	PQ	PQ	19,962	65.30%	10,041	32.85%	73.70%	19,962	9,921	514	–	173	30,570
Fabre	PQ	PQ	15,361	52.78%	2,265	7.78%	87.25%	15,361	13,096	648	–	–	29,105
Frontenac	PQ	PQ	16,549	53.29%	7,098	22.86%	85.70%	16,549	9,451	4,903	–	152	31,055
Gaspé	UN	PQ	12,136	47.08%	1,232	4.78%	81.08%	12,136	10,904	2,739	–	–	25,779
Gatineau	Lib	Lib	12,244	54.56%	2,416	10.77%	81.71%	9,828	12,244	369	–	–	22,441
Gouin	PQ	PQ	15,563	57.76%	5,209	19.33%	80.64%	15,563	10,354	607	66	352	26,942
Groulx	New	PQ	20,317	57.20%	6,074	17.10%	84.78%	20,317	14,243	861	–	101	35,522
Hull	PQ	Lib	15,572	49.76%	456	1.46%	80.19%	15,116	15,572	263	96	247	31,294
Huntingdon	UN	Lib	13,454	56.91%	5,088	21.52%	81.79%	8,366	13,454	1,821	–	–	23,641
Iberville	PQ	PQ	16,822	49.18%	1,939	5.67%	85.63%	16,822	14,883	2,498	–	–	34,203
Îles-de-la-Madeleine	PQ	PQ	5,278	63.79%	2,427	29.33%	88.30%	5,278	2,851	57	88	–	8,274
Jacques-Cartier	Lib	Lib	25,894	79.52%	20,911	64.22%	83.04%	4,983	25,894	259	1,122	304	32,562
Jean-Talon	Lib	Lib	17,290	52.28%	2,246	6.79%	85.96%	15,044	17,290	526	215	–	33,075
Jeanne-Mance	PQ	Lib	19,652	58.65%	6,180	18.44%	84.46%	13,472	19,652	385	–	–	33,509
Johnson	UN	PQ	13,131	47.90%	806	2.94%	85.31%	13,131	12,325	1,959	–	–	27,415
Joliette	New	PQ	16,343	51.95%	5,200	16.53%	86.46%	16,343	11,143	3,971	–	–	31,457
Jonquière	PQ	PQ	23,562	65.99%	12,235	34.27%	83.63%	23,562	11,327	582	–	235	35,706
Kamouraska-Témiscouata	PQ	PQ	14,702	54.95%	4,189	15.66%	77.88%	14,702	10,513	1,539	–	–	26,754
L'Acadie	Lib	Lib	22,784	68.16%	12,630	37.79%	83.92%	10,154	22,784	369	118	–	33,425
L'Assomption	PQ	PQ	22,605	61.61%	10,455	28.50%	87.04%	22,605	12,150	1,934	–	–	36,689
La Peltrie	New	PQ	17,975	57.31%	5,337	17.02%	86.78%	17,975	12,638	749	–	–	31,362
Labelle (Note: formerly Laurentides-Labelle)	PQ	PQ	17,596	57.70%	5,774	18.93%	79.93%	17,596	11,822	1,079	–	–	30,497
Lac-Saint-Jean	PQ	PQ	19,602	62.32%	8,954	28.47%	86.29%	19,602	10,648	1,205	–	–	31,455
LaFontaine	PQ	PQ	20,028	62.08%	8,534	26.45%	83.85%	20,028	11,494	607	–	131	32,260
Laporte	PQ	Lib	19,316	60.09%	7,097	22.08%	84.02%	12,219	19,316	509	–	103	32,147
La Prairie	PQ	Lib	19,070	49.26%	328	0.85%	85.49%	18,742	19,070	813	–	91	38,716
Laurier	Lib	Lib	16,719	57.99%	6,848	23.75%	80.21%	9,871	16,719	675	336	1,229	28,830
Laval-des-Rapides	New	PQ	18,667	57.93%	5,840	18.12%	85.14%	18,667	12,827	658	–	70	32,222
Laviolette	PQ	PQ	16,403	56.44%	5,067	17.43%	82.81%	16,403	11,336	1,324	–	0	29,063
Lévis	PQ	PQ	24,444	59.42%	8,804	21.40%	85.74%	24,444	15,640	972	–	82	41,138
Limoilou	PQ	PQ	17,317	54.43%	3,881	12.20%	81.01%	17,317	13,436	851	–	213	31,817
Lotbinière	UN	PQ	11,653	48.94%	1,365	5.73%	85.12%	11,653	10,288	1,872	–	–	23,813
Louis-Hébert	PQ	PQ	20,345	61.36%	8,127	24.51%	84.34%	20,345	12,218	473	–	121	33,157
Maisonneuve	PQ	PQ	16,930	57.82%	5,523	18.86%	80.23%	16,930	11,407	513	–	429	29,279
Marguerite-Bourgeoys	Lib	Lib	19,511	67.51%	10,541	36.47%	82.74%	8,970	19,511	355	–	64	28,900
Marie-Victorin	New	PQ	19,472	65.49%	10,264	34.52%	81.83%	19,472	9,208	772	–	282	29,734
Marquette	New	Lib	13,146	50.54%	937	3.60%	82.04%	12,209	13,146	365	–	293	26,013
Maskinongé	Lib	Lib	13,248	46.89%	233	0.82%	85.27%	13,015	13,248	1,993	–	–	28,256
Matane	PQ	PQ	13,980	57.08%	4,367	17.83%	79.98%	13,980	9,613	704	197	–	24,494
Matapédia	PQ	PQ	10,445	52.49%	3,267	16.42%	79.59%	10,445	7,178	2,276	–	–	19,899
Mégantic-Compton	UN	Lib	11,795	51.73%	2,327	10.21%	82.04%	9,468	11,795	1,539	–	–	22,802
Mercier	PQ	PQ	16,252	54.53%	3,919	13.15%	79.92%	16,252	12,333	495	116	608	29,804
Mille-Îles	PQ	PQ	16,825	53.97%	3,196	10.25%	88.37%	16,825	13,629	720	–	–	31,174
Mont-Royal	Lib	Lib	21,875	80.69%	17,500	64.55%	78.60%	4,375	21,875	188	–	671	27,109
Montmagny-L'Islet	Lib	PQ	11,797	45.50%	231	0.89%	80.14%	11,797	11,566	2,566	–	–	25,929
Montmorency	PQ	PQ	21,791	62.48%	9,553	27.39%	83.53%	21,791	12,238	710	–	140	34,879
Nelligan (Note: formerly Pointe-Claire)	UN	Lib	23,168	73.85%	16,055	51.18%	82.46%	7,113	23,168	375	–	716	31,372
Nicolet (Note: formerly Nicolet-Yamaska)	UN	PQ	9,318	34.86%	362	1.35%	86.13%	9,318	8,956	8,453	–	–	26,727
Notre-Dame-de-Grâce	Lib	Lib	24,821	81.96%	20,540	67.82%	78.53%	4,281	24,821	174	–	1,008	30,284
Orford	Lib	Lib	15,828	54.40%	3,642	12.52%	82.13%	12,186	15,828	1,083	–	–	29,097
Outremont	Lib	Lib	15,310	55.12%	3,403	12.25%	81.80%	11,907	15,310	215	68	275	27,775
Papineau	PQ	Lib	11,717	53.31%	1,976	8.99%	82.07%	9,741	11,717	412	–	110	21,980
Pontiac	New	Lib	15,157	67.83%	10,466	46.84%	76.80%	4,691	15,157	704	–	1,793	22,345
Portneuf	Lib	Lib	14,120	51.14%	1,513	5.48%	86.96%	12,607	14,120	884	–	–	27,611
Prévost	PQ	PQ	16,137	53.15%	3,054	10.06%	82.10%	16,137	13,083	955	–	189	30,364
Richelieu	PQ	PQ	18,198	56.06%	5,173	15.94%	85.85%	18,198	13,025	1,037	77	122	32,459
Richmond	UN	Lib	10,158	47.43%	253	1.18%	86.14%	9,905	10,158	1,354	–	–	21,417
Rimouski	PQ	PQ	20,106	61.04%	8,963	27.21%	83.89%	20,106	11,143	1,525	–	163	32,937
Rivière-du-Loup	PQ	PQ	12,871	55.32%	3,629	15.60%	80.70%	12,871	9,242	1,154	–	–	23,267
Robert-Baldwin	Lib	Lib	26,865	77.84%	20,214	58.57%	82.49%	6,651	26,865	260	–	735	34,511
Roberval	Lib	PQ	19,301	57.85%	6,541	19.61%	83.58%	19,301	12,760	1,302	–	–	33,363
Rosemont	PQ	PQ	17,137	52.69%	2,703	8.31%	82.69%	17,137	14,434	588	–	365	32,524
Rousseau	New	PQ	14,950	48.50%	2,288	7.42%	80.74%	14,950	12,662	3,107	106	–	30,825
Rouyn-Noranda–Témiscamingue	New	PQ	15,649	54.94%	3,915	13.75%	77.94%	15,649	11,734	629	214	257	28,483
Saguenay	PQ	PQ	17,069	66.56%	8,930	34.82%	75.43%	17,069	8,139	436	–	–	25,644
Saint-François	PQ	PQ	15,990	52.08%	2,124	6.92%	82.77%	15,990	13,866	722	–	124	30,702
Saint-Henri	PQ	Lib	14,490	48.22%	71	0.24%	79.68%	14,419	14,490	778	–	361	30,048
Saint-Hyacinthe	UN	PQ	14,109	43.64%	2,597	8.03%	83.13%	14,109	11,512	6,708	–	–	32,329
Saint-Jacques	PQ	PQ	15,727	63.44%	7,585	30.60%	72.45%	15,727	8,142	443	62	417	24,791
Saint-Jean	PQ	PQ	17,687	50.97%	1,950	5.62%	83.59%	17,687	15,737	1,274	–	–	34,698
Saint-Laurent	Lib	Lib	24,176	72.21%	15,309	45.72%	80.90%	8,867	24,176	439	–	–	33,482
Saint-Louis	Lib	Lib	15,781	69.12%	9,584	41.98%	69.49%	6,197	15,781	234	123	495	22,830
Saint-Maurice	PQ	PQ	15,989	55.64%	4,863	16.92%	84.70%	15,989	11,126	1,505	79	39	28,738
Saint-Anne	PQ	Lib	11,537	50.89%	1,163	5.13%	74.98%	10,374	11,537	486	–	272	22,669
Sainte-Marie	PQ	PQ	13,667	61.35%	6,067	27.24%	75.11%	13,667	7,600	493	135	381	22,276
Sauvé	PQ	PQ	15,420	52.98%	2,377	8.17%	82.50%	15,420	13,043	550	–	94	29,107
Shefford	Lib	PQ	15,632	46.78%	727	2.18%	85.71%	15,632	14,905	2,725	–	156	33,418
Sherbrooke	PQ	PQ	16,194	52.83%	2,309	7.53%	83.00%	16,194	13,885	450	–	125	30,654
Taillon	PQ	PQ	21,535	67.59%	12,035	37.77%	83.58%	21,535	9,500	619	–	209	31,863
Taschereau	PQ	PQ	13,591	56.98%	4,207	17.64%	76.39%	13,591	9,384	566	–	310	23,851
Terrebonne	PQ	PQ	19,344	63.25%	8,981	29.36%	84.00%	19,344	10,363	878	–	–	30,585
Trois-Rivières	PQ	PQ	16,070	51.32%	1,950	6.23%	81.51%	16,070	14,120	926	83	113	31,312
Ungava	New	PQ	9,679	61.53%	3,627	23.06%	53.85%	9,679	6,052	–	–	–	15,731
Vachon	New	PQ	17,671	57.85%	5,699	18.66%	83.59%	17,671	11,972	901	–	–	30,544
Vanier	PQ	PQ	20,490	62.86%	9,217	28.27%	81.84%	20,490	11,273	655	–	180	32,598
Vaudreuil-Soulanges	PQ	Lib	18,992	51.56%	1,955	5.31%	84.92%	17,037	18,992	491	246	66	36,832
Verchères	PQ	PQ	19,272	55.98%	5,045	14.65%	87.34%	19,272	14,227	930	–	–	34,429
Verdun	Lib	Lib	17,406	61.40%	7,214	25.45%	83.49%	10,192	17,406	415	–	336	28,349
Viau	PQ	Lib	16,657	55.19%	4,103	13.60%	81.58%	12,554	16,657	574	–	394	30,179
Viger	New	Lib	18,794	59.37%	6,528	20.62%	84.64%	12,266	18,794	598	–	–	31,658
Vimont	New	PQ	16,725	56.03%	4,260	14.27%	87.90%	16,725	12,465	660	–	–	29,850
Westmount	Lib	Lib	22,636	79.87%	17,864	63.03%	77.57%	4,772	22,636	216	105	613	28,342

= open seat
= turnout is above provincial average
= winning candidate was in previous Legislature
= incumbent had switched allegiance
= previously incumbent in another riding
= not incumbent; was previously elected to the Legislature
= incumbency arose from byelection gain
= other incumbents renominated
= previously an MP in the House of Commons of Canada
= multiple candidates

=== Analysis ===
Candidates ranked 1st to 5th place, by party
Parties	1st	2nd	3rd	4th	5th
█ Parti Québécois	80	42			
█ Liberal	42	80			
█ Union Nationale			112	6	3
█ Marxist–Leninist			4	3	2
█ Freedom of Choice			3	6	2
█ Independent			2	11	4
█ Workers' Communist				23	6
█ United Social Credit				6	2
█ Communist				2	3
█ Workers				1	6
█ Socialist-Workers				1	1

Resulting composition of the 31st Quebec Legislative Assembly
Source		Party		
Source		PQ	Lib	Total
Seats retained	Incumbents returned	49	18	67
Seats retained	Open seats held - new MNAs	8	3	11
Seats retained	Open seats held - return of previous member	1		1
Seats retained	Byelection loss reversed	2		2
Seats changing hands	Incumbents defeated - new MNAs	6	6	12
Seats changing hands	Incumbents defeated - return of previous members		2	2
Seats changing hands	Open seats gained	1	4	5
Seats changing hands	Byelection gain held		3	3
Seats changing hands	Incumbent changed allegiance	1	1	2
Seats changing hands	Ouster of third-party byelection gain	1		1
New ridings	New MNAs	6		6
New ridings	Previous incumbent from other riding	5	4	9
New ridings	Former MNA elected		1	1
Total		80	42	110

== See also ==
- List of Quebec premiers
- Politics of Quebec
- Timeline of Quebec history
- List of Quebec political parties
- 32nd National Assembly of Quebec
