= 30th Quebec Legislature =

The 30th National Assembly of Quebec was the provincial legislature in Quebec, Canada that was elected in the 1973 Quebec general election. It sat for four sessions, from 22 November 1973 to 22 December 1973; from 14 March 1974 to 28 December 1974; from 18 March 1975 to 19 December 1975; and from 16 March 1976 to 18 October 1976. The governing Quebec Liberal Party was led by Premier Robert Bourassa; the Parti Québécois formed the official opposition for the first time, but since party leader René Lévesque did not have a seat, the leader of the opposition was Jacques-Yvan Morin.

== Seats per political party ==
- After the 1973 elections

Affiliation	Members
Parti libéral du Québec	102
Parti Québécois	6
Parti créditiste	2
Total	110
Government Majority	96

== Member list ==
This was the list of members of the National Assembly of Quebec that were elected in the 1973 election:

Name	Party	Riding	First elected / previously elected	No. of terms
Roger Houde	Libéral	Abitibi-Est	1973	1st term
Jean-Hugues Boutin	Libéral	Abitibi-Ouest	1973	1st term
Yves Tardif	Libéral	Anjou	1973	1st term
Zoel Saindon	Libéral	Argenteuil	1966	3rd term
Gilles Massé	Libéral	Arthabaska	1970	2nd term
Denys Sylvain	Libéral	Beauce-Nord	1973	1st term
Fabien Roy	Parti créditiste	Beauce-Sud	1970	2nd term
Fabien Roy	Independent	Beauce-Sud	1970	2nd term
Fabien Roy	Parti national populaire	Beauce-Sud	1970	2nd term
Gérard Cadieux	Libéral	Beauharnois	1962	4th term
Pierre Mercier	Libéral	Bellechasse	1973	1st term
Michel Denis	Libéral	Berthier	1973	1st term
Gérard D. Levesque	Libéral	Bonaventure	1956	6th term
Lise Bacon	Libéral	Bourassa	1973	1st term
Jean Boudreault	Libéral	Bourget	1973	1st term
Glendon Brown	Libéral	Brome-Missisquoi	1956	6th term
Guy Saint-Pierre	Libéral	Chambly	1970	2nd term
Normand Toupin	Libéral	Champlain	1970	2nd term
André Harvey	Libéral	Charlesbourg	1970	2nd term
Raymond Mailloux	Libéral	Charlevoix	1962	4th term
George Kennedy	Libéral	Châteauguay	1962	4th term
Bernard Lachapelle	Libéral	Chauveau	1973	1st term
Marc-André Bédard	Parti Québécois	Chicoutimi	1973	1st term
Jean Bienvenue	Libéral	Crémazie	1966	3rd term
Victor Goldbloom	Libéral	D'Arcy-McGee	1966	3rd term
Jean-Paul L'Allier	Libéral	Deux-Montagnes	1970	2nd term
Alfred Bossé	Libéral	Dorion	1970	2nd term
Robert Malouin	Libéral	Drummond	1973	1st term
Ghislain Harvey	Libéral	Dubuc	1973	1st term
Donald Gallienne	Libéral	Duplessis	1972	2nd term
Gilles Houde	Libéral	Fabre	1966	3rd term
Henri Lecours	Libéral	Frontenac	1973	1st term
Guy Fortier	Libéral	Gaspé	1962	4th term
Michel Gratton	Libéral	Gatineau	1972	2nd term
Jean M. Beauregard	Libéral	Gouin	1973	1st term
Oswald Parent	Libéral	Hull	1956	6th term
Kenneth Fraser	Libéral	Huntingdon	1966	3rd term
Jacques Tremblay	Libéral	Iberville	1973	1st term
Louis-Philippe Lacroix	Libéral	Îles-de-la-Madeleine	1962	4th term
Noël Saint-Germain	Libéral	Jacques-Cartier	1966	3rd term
Aimé Brisson	Libéral	Jeanne-Mance	1962	4th term
Raymond Garneau	Libéral	Jean-Talon	1970	2nd term
Jean-Claude Boutin	Libéral	Johnson	1973	1st term
Maurice Bellemare (1974)	Union Nationale	Johnson	1944, (Note: Champlain) 1974	8th term*
Robert Quenneville	Libéral	Joliette-Montcalm	1970	2nd term
Gérald Harvey	Libéral	Jonquière	1960	5th term
Jean-Marie Pelletier	Libéral	Kamouraska-Témiscouata	1970	2nd term
François Cloutier	Libéral	L'Acadie	1970	2nd term
Roger Pilote	Libéral	Lac-Saint-Jean	1970	2nd term
Marcel Léger	Parti Québécois	LaFontaine	1970	2nd term
André Déom	Libéral	Laporte	1973	1st term
Paul Berthiaume	Libéral	La Prairie	1970	2nd term
Jean Perreault	Libéral	L'Assomption	1970	2nd term
Roger Lapointe	Libéral	Laurentides-Labelle	1973	1st term
André Marchand	Libéral	Laurier	1970	2nd term
Jean-Noël Lavoie	Libéral	Laval	1960	5th term
Prudent Carpentier	Libéral	Laviolette	1970	2nd term
Vincent F. Chagnon	Libéral	Lévis	1973	1st term
Fernand Houde	Libéral	Limoilou	1970	2nd term
Georges Massicotte	Libéral	Lotbinière	1973	1st term
Gaston Desjardins	Libéral	Louis-Hébert	1973	1st term
Robert Burns	Parti Québécois	Maisonneuve	1970	2nd term
Fernand Lalonde	Libéral	Marguerite-Bourgeoys	1973	1st term
Yvon Picotte	Libéral	Maskinongé	1973	1st term
Marc-Yvan Côté	Libéral	Matane	1973	1st term
Bona Arsenault	Libéral	Matapédia	1960	5th term
Omer Dionne	Libéral	Mégantic-Compton	1970	2nd term
Robert Bourassa	Libéral	Mercier	1966	3rd term
Bernard Lachance	Libéral	Mille-Îles	1973	1st term
Julien Giasson	Libéral	Montmagny-L'Islet	1970	2nd term
Marcel Bédard	Libéral	Montmorency	1973	1st term
John Ciaccia	Libéral	Mont-Royal	1973	1st term
Benjamin Faucher	Libéral	Nicolet-Yamaska	1970	2nd term
William Tetley	Libéral	Notre-Dame-de-Grâce	1968	3rd term
Georges Vaillancourt	Libéral	Orford	1960	5th term
Jérôme Choquette	Libéral	Outremont	1966	3rd term
Jérôme Choquette	Independent	Outremont	1966	3rd term
Jérôme Choquette	Parti national populaire	Outremont	1966	3rd term
Mark Assad	Libéral	Papineau	1970	2nd term
Arthur E. Séguin	Libéral	Pointe-Claire	1966	3rd term
Jean-Guy Larivière	Libéral	Pontiac-Témiscamingue	1970	2nd term
Michel Pagé	Libéral	Portneuf	1973	1st term
Bernard A. Parent	Libéral	Prévost	1973	1st term
Claude Simard	Libéral	Richelieu	1970	2nd term
Yvon Vallières	Libéral	Richmond	1973	1st term
Claude St-Hilaire	Libéral	Rimouski	1973	1st term
Paul Lafrance	Libéral	Rivière-du-Loup	1970	2nd term
Jean Cournoyer	Libéral	Robert-Baldwin	1969, (Note: Saint-Jacques (First elected as a Union Nationale candidate)) 1971	3rd term*
Robert Lamontagne	Libéral	Roberval	1970	2nd term
Gilles Bellemare	Libéral	Rosemont	1973	1st term
Camil Samson	Parti créditiste	Rouyn-Noranda	1970	2nd term
Lucien Lessard	Parti Québécois	Saguenay	1970	2nd term
Georges Springate	Libéral	Saint-Anne	1970	2nd term
Georges Springate	Independent	Saint-Anne	1970	2nd term
Georges Springate	Libéral	Saint-Anne	1970	2nd term
Jean-Claude Malépart	Libéral	Sainte-Marie	1973	1st term
Gérard Déziel	Libéral	Saint-François	1973	1st term
Gérard Shanks	Libéral	Saint-Henri	1970	2nd term
Gérard Shanks	Independent	Saint-Henri	1970	2nd term
Fernand Cornellier	Libéral	Saint-Hyacinthe	1970	2nd term
Claude Charron	Parti Québécois	Saint-Jacques	1970	2nd term
Jacques Veilleux	Libéral	Saint-Jean	1970	2nd term
Claude Forget	Libéral	Saint-Laurent	1973	1st term
Harry Blank	Libéral	Saint-Louis	1960	5th term
Marcel Bérard	Libéral	Saint-Maurice	1973	1st term
Jacques-Yvan Morin	Parti Québécois	Sauvé	1973	1st term
Richard Verreault	Libéral	Shefford	1973	1st term
Jean-Paul Pépin	Libéral	Sherbrooke	1970	2nd term
Guy Leduc	Libéral	Taillon	1966	3rd term
Guy Leduc	Independent	Taillon	1966	3rd term
Irénée Bonnier	Libéral	Taschereau	1973	1st term
Denis Hardy	Libéral	Terrebonne	1965, 1970	3rd term*
Guy Bacon	Libéral	Trois-Rivières	1970	2nd term
Fernand Dufour	Libéral	Vanier	1973	1st term
Paul Phaneuf	Libéral	Vaudreuil-Soulanges	1970	2nd term
Marcel Ostiguy	Libéral	Verchères	1970	2nd term
Lucien Caron	Libéral	Verdun	1970	2nd term
Fernand Picard	Libéral	Viau	1966	3rd term
Thomas Kevin Drummond	Libéral	Westmount	1970	2nd term

== Other elected MNAs ==
Other MNAs were elected in by-elections during the mandate

- Maurice Bellemare, Union Nationale, Johnson, August 28, 1974

== Cabinet Ministers ==
- Prime Minister and Executive Council President: Robert Bourassa
- Deputy Premier: Gérard D. Levesque
- Agriculture: Normand Toupin (1973–1975), Thomas Kevin Drummond (1975–1976)
- Labour and Workforce: Jean Cournoyer (1973–1975), Gerald Harvey (1975–1976)
- Public Works: Maurice Tessier (1970, 1973), Bernard Pinard (1970–1973)
  - Public Works and Provisioning: Raymond Mailloux (1973–1975), William Tetley (1975–1976)
- Public Office: Oswald Parent
- Cultural Affairs: Denis Hardy (1973–1975), Jean-Paul L'Allier (1975–1976)
- Immigration: Jean Bienvenue (1973–1976), Lise Bacon (1976)
- Social Affairs: Claude Castonguay (1973)
- Education: François Cloutier (1973–1975), Jerome Choquette (1975), Raymond Garneau (1975–1976), Jean Bienvenue (1976)
- Lands and Forests: Thomas Kevin Drummond (1973–1975), Normand Toupin (1975–1976)
- Tourism, Hunting and Fishing: Claude Simard
- Natural Resources: Jean-Gilles Massé (1973–1975), Jean Cournoyer (1975–1976)
- Transportation: Raymond Mailloux
- Communications: Jean-Paul L'Allier (1973–1975), Denis Hardy (1975–1976)
- Municipal Affairs and Environment: Victor Goldbloom
- Intergovernmental Affairs: Gérard D. Levesque (1973–1975), Francois Cloutier (1975–1976), Robert Bourassa (1976)
- Industry and Commerce: Guy Saint-Pierre
- Financial Institutions, Companies and Cooperatives: William Tetley (1973–1975)
  - Consumers, Cooperatives and Financial : Lise Bacon (1975–1976)
- Justice: Jérôme Choquette (1973–1975), Gérard D. Levesque (1975–1976)
- Solicitor General: Fernand Lalonde (1975–1976)
- Finances and President of the Treasury Board: Raymond Garneau
- Revenu: Gérald Harvey (1973–1975), Robert Quenneville (1975–1976)
- State Ministers: Paul Phaneuf, Robert Quenneville (1973–1975), Lise Bacon (1973–1975), Paul Berthiaume, Bernard Lachapelle, Fernand Lalonde, Oswald Parent, Julien Giasson (1975–1976), Georges Vaillancourt
