= Jean-Yves Desgagnés =

Canadian political activist

Coordinator of the Front commun des personnes assistées sociales du Québec (FCPASQ)
- In office 1990?–1991?
- Preceded by: Fernande Brosseau
- Succeeded by: Claudette Champagne or Thérèse Spénard
- In office 1996–2004
- Preceded by: Claudette Champagne
- Succeeded by: Éric Bondo

Personal details
- Political party: Québec solidaire
- Profession: activist

Jean-Yves Desgagnés is a political activist in the Canadian province of Quebec. He has worked for many years on behalf of people receiving social assistance and has sought election to the Legislative Assembly of Quebec four times. Desgagnés is a member of Québec solidaire.

== Early life ==
Desgagnés worked at the Centre populaire de Roberval from 1981 to 1985. He subsequently returned to academia, and he later spent six months in Latin America.

== Activism ==
Desgagnés was co-coordinator of the Front commun des personnes assistées sociales du Québec (Common Front of Quebec Social Assistance Recipients) in the early 1990s and again from 1996 to 2004. In this capacity, he was a vocal critic of the social assistance policies pursued by several Quebec governments.

In 1991, he accused Robert Bourassa's government of creating hunger among low-income children through program cuts that amounted to one hundred million dollars per year. While acknowledging that a school meals program introduced at the same time was better than nothing, he also described it as an act of gross hypocrisy under the circumstances.

In the late 1990s, Desgagnés criticized the government of Lucien Bouchard for cutting social programs in order to balance the provincial deficit. He was particularly critical of a provincial work-for-welfare scheme, arguing that it was ineffective as a job creation program. In the buildup to a 1998 provincial election, he organized protests against government cuts in several Quebec cities.

Desgagnés also criticized the government of Bernard Landry at times, though he supported its 2002 budgetary announcements for low-income Quebecers. He was strongly critical of the Jean Charest government's first budget in 2003, arguing that it required welfare recipients to apply for training programs that were themselves being cut. He did, however, welcome the Charest government's decision to remove financial penalties for recipients the following year.

Although Desgagnés is a Quebec sovereigntist, he has sometimes downplayed nationalism in order to focus on with social justice concerns. He criticized the Quebec government's 1991 decision to impose user fees on some medical services and supported the Canadian government in its efforts to overturn the policy. "It's unacceptable to have user fees, because it implies health services won't be accessible to poor people," he said. "As long as we're in Canada . . . we still need national standards."

Desgagnés condemned a 2003 Supreme Court of Canada decision that allowed the Quebec government to pay less than minimum wage to people on social assistance programs.

In 2008, Desgagnés was described as a researcher for the Centre de recherche de Montréal sur les inégalités, les discriminations et les pratiques alternatives de citoyenneté (CREMIS) and Masculinités et société, and also as a lecturer and doctoral student at Université Laval.

== Politics ==
Desgagnés was the political attaché for Parti Québécois legislator Louise Harel in 1988–89. He was a member of the small Mouvement socialiste party in the same period and ran under its banner in the 1989 provincial election.

In the 2003 election, he ran as an independent candidate supported by the Union des forces progressistes. He supported a ten-dollar minimum wage and free medication for people on social assistance, and indicated that he was strongly opposed to the social policies of the Action démocratique du Québec.

A longtime ally of Françoise David, Desgagnés was a founding member of her Option citoyenne party in 2004. Option citoyenne later merged into Québec solidaire, and Desgagnés ran under that party's banner in the 2007 and 2008 provincial elections. He was fifty years old in 2007.

== Electoral record ==
2008 Quebec general election: Jean-Lesage
Party	Candidate	Votes	%	±%
Liberal	André Drolet	11,674	41.68	+12.40
Parti Québécois	Hélène Guillemette	7,471	26.68	+3.71
Action démocratique	Jean-François Gosselin	7,307	26.09	−13.77
Québec solidaire	Jean-Yves Desgagnés	1,238	4.42	+0.87
Independent	José Breton	316	1.13	+0.75
Total valid votes		28,006	100.00	
Rejected and declined votes		453		
Turnout		28,459	58.60	−14.05
Electors on the lists		48,562		
Source: Official Results, Government of Quebec

2007 Quebec general election: Jean-Lesage
Party	Candidate	Votes	%	±%
Action démocratique	Jean-François Gosselin	13,865	39.86	+14.51
Liberal	Michel Després	10,185	29.28	−14.94
Parti Québécois	Christian Simard	7,990	22.97	−3.79
Québec solidaire	Jean-Yves Desgagnés	1,236	3.55	+1.52
Green	Lucien Rodrigue	1,159	3.33	n/a
Independent	José Breton	131	0.38	n/a
Christian Democracy	Danielle Benny	116	0.33	n/a
Marxist–Leninist	Jean Bédard	100	0.29	−0.24
Total valid votes		34,782	100.00	
Rejected and declined votes		321		
Turnout		35,103	72.65	+0.41
Electors on the lists		48,319		

2003 Quebec general election: Jean-Lesage
Party	Candidate	Votes	%	±%
Liberal	Michel Després	15,547	44.22	
Parti Québécois	Robert Caron	9,408	26.76	
Action démocratique	Aurel Bélanger	8,912	25.35	
Independent	Jean-Yves Desgagnés	714	2.03	
Bloc Pot	Nicolas Frichot	390	1.11	
Marxist–Leninist	Jean Bédard	185	0.53	
Total valid votes		35,156	100.00	
Rejected and declined votes		391		
Turnout		35,547	72.24	
Electors on the lists		49,205		

1989 Quebec general election: Rosemont
Party	Candidate	Votes	%
Liberal	Guy Rivard (incumbent)	13,121	46.97
Parti Québécois	Sylvain Simard	12,988	46.50
New Democratic	Pierre Dion	620	2.22
Progressive Conservative	Lyse T. Giguère	298	1.07
Parti indépendantiste	Richard Belleau	278	1.00
Workers	Régis Beaulieu	256	0.92
Commonwealth of Canada	Normand Bélanger	134	0.48
United Social Credit	Jean-Paul Poulin	92	0.33
Marxist–Leninist	France Tremblay	79	0.28
Socialist Movement	Jean-Yves Desgagnés	67	0.24
Total valid votes		27,933	
Rejected and declined votes		862	
Turnout		28,795	75.65
Electors on the lists		38,064	
Source: Official Results, Le Directeur général des élections du Québec.
