= Norman Cherry =

Norman Cherry or Sherry may refer to:

- Normand Cherry (1938–2021), Canadian politician and union leader
- Norman Sherry (1925–2016), English novelist
- Norm Sherry (1931–2021), American baseball player and coach
