= Mouvement socialiste candidates in the 1989 Quebec provincial election =

The Mouvement socialiste fielded ten candidates in the 1989 Quebec general election, none of whom were elected.

== Candidates ==
=== Sainte-Anne: Thérèse Spénard ===
Thérèse Spénard was an anti-poverty activist in Quebec. She was one of three spokeswomen for the Front commun des personnes assistées sociales du Québec (FCPASQ) in 1988, when the organization tried to overturn harsh social assistance reforms introduced by the Liberal government of Robert Bourassa. Newspaper reports from this period indicate that she was a single mother, less than thirty years old.

Spénard continued as a spokesperson for the FCPASQ in the 1990s. She offered qualified support for minister André Bourbeau's reforms to provincial disabled services in 1992, but called for his resignation the following year after media reports of new restrictions for social assistance recipients.

She received 42 votes (0.19%) in the 1989 election, finishing thirteenth against Liberal candidate Normand Cherry.
