= Noëlla Champagne =

Canadian politician (born 1944)

MNA for Champlain
- In office 2008–2014
- Preceded by: Pierre-Michel Auger
- Succeeded by: Pierre-Michel Auger
- In office 2003–2007
- Preceded by: Yves Beaumier
- Succeeded by: Pierre-Michel Auger

Personal details
- Born: December 25, 1944 (age 81) Saint-Tite, Quebec
- Party: Parti Québécois

Noëlla Champagne (French pronunciation: [nɔɛla ʃɑ̃paɲ]; born December 25, 1944, in Saint-Tite, Quebec) is a politician from Quebec, Canada, and former Member of the National Assembly (MNA).

== Political career ==
Champagne taught French and history at the secondary level from 1964 to 1971. Before her political career, she was the political secretary for Champlain MNA Yves Beaumier from 1997 to 2003.

She ran as a Parti Québécois (PQ) candidate in the district of Champlain in the 2003 election (on April 14), which resulted in a tie vote. A subsequent by-election was necessary to break the tie, and it gave Champagne, who became the 45th PQ MNA to the new assembly, the victory over Liberal candidate and former MNA Pierre-A. Brouillette by 642 votes.

In 2007, she was defeated by the Action Démocratique du Québec candidate Pierre-Michel Auger, as were many of her colleagues from the Mauricie area and other small-town regions of Quebec. In the 2008 election, however, Champagne won her seat back from Auger, who had switched from the ADQ to the Quebec Liberal Party before the election.

She was defeated in the 2014 election.
