= Paul Shooner =

Canadian politician (1923–2025)

Member of the Legislative Assembly of Quebec for Yamaska
- In office 1966–1970
- Preceded by: Antonio Élie
- Succeeded by: Benjamin Faucher

Personal details
- Born: May 2, 1923 Pierreville, Quebec, Canada
- Died: June 11, 2025 (aged 102) Saint-Jérôme, Quebec, Canada
- Party: Union Nationale

Paul Shooner (May 2, 1923 – June 11, 2025) was a Canadian politician. He was the Union Nationale member of the Legislative Assembly of Quebec for Yamaska from 1966 to 1970. As of June 2020, Shooner lived in Pierreville, Quebec and still took daily walks in his town to stay active. He turned 100 on May 2, 2023, and died at a hospital in Saint-Jérôme, Quebec on June 11, 2025, at the age of 102.
