= Pierre-A. Brouillette =

Canadian politician

Pierre-A. Brouillette (born May 24, 1951 in Saint-Séverin, Mauricie) was a politician in Quebec, Canada. He is a businessman.

== Biography ==
Brouillette was elected as a Liberal candidate to the provincial legislature in the district of Champlain in 1985. He was re-elected in 1989, but was defeated by PQ candidate Yves Beaumier in 1994.

He tried to return in the 2003 election (on April 14), but the election resulted in a tie vote. In a by-election held on May 20 to break the tie, PQ candidate Noëlla Champagne defeated Brouillette by 642 votes.

National Assembly of Quebec
Preceded by Marcel Gagnon (PQ)	MNA, District of Champlain; 1985–1994	Succeeded by Yves Beaumier (PQ)
