= Joseph-Arthur Labissonnière =

Canadian politician

Joseph-Arthur Labissonnière was a politician in Quebec, Canada and an official opposition Member of the Legislative Assembly of Quebec (MLA).

== Early life ==
He was born on December 25, 1875, in Batiscan, Mauricie and was a farmer.

== Member of the legislature ==
He ran as a Conservative candidate in the district of in the provincial district of Champlain in 1912 and won against Liberal incumbent Pierre-Calixte Neault. He lost re-election in 1916. He was succeeded by Liberal Bruno Bordeleau.

Labissonnière tried to make a political comeback but was defeated again in 1923.

== Town Politics ==
Labissonnière served as Mayor of Champlain from 1917 to 1922.

== Death ==
He died on May 9, 1930, in Champlain.

== See also ==
- Champlain Provincial Electoral District
- Mauricie

National Assembly of Quebec
Preceded by Pierre-Calixte Neault, Liberal	MLA, District of Champlain; 1912–1916	Succeeded by Bruno Bordeleau, Liberal
