= Robert Caron =

Quebecois sociologist and labour leader

Robert Caron is a sociologist and former labour leader in the Canadian province of Quebec. He served two terms as president of the Syndicat des professionnels du government du Quebec (SPGQ) and ran for provincial office in 2003 as a candidate of the Parti Québécois (PQ).

== Labour leader ==
Caron became active with the SPGQ in 1983, was one of its vice-presidents from 1988 to 1992, and served two terms as its president from 1994 to 2000. Elected without opposition in 1994, he scored a decisive victory over challenger Léo Pelletier in 1997. As president, he represented 13,000 workers.

Caron demonstrated against the newly elected Parti Québécois government of Jacques Parizeau in 1994, both for its failure to remove anti-labour legislation and for its use of private research firms to study overlap between the provincial and federal governments. Caron argued that existing government bodies could have carried out the research. (The government responded that it would use civil servants for research on Quebec matters, but would contract out studies on federal matters where provincial workers had little expertise.)

The following year, Caron criticized the Parizeau government for holding secret negotiations to integrate federal Canadian civil servants into a sovereign Quebec. He later clarified that he did not object to the integration process, but wanted his group to be included in the talks. A reconciliation was later reached, and Caron appeared at a press conference with government minister Pauline Marois as she announced an agreement in principle on the matter shortly before the 1995 Quebec referendum on sovereignty. Caron himself supported the sovereignty option, which was narrowly defeated.

Caron later took part in several high-profile negotiations with the government of Lucien Bouchard (Parizeau's successor as PQ leader and premier), who attempted to balance the provincial budget by a wage rollback in the civil service. In 1999, Caron argued that Quebec workers would be less likely to support Quebec sovereignty, or the PQ, if the Bouchard government pursued an anti-labour agenda. The SPGQ did not support any party in the 1998 provincial election, although Caron strongly opposed the Action démocratique du Québec's proposal to reduce the size of the civil service.

Caron called for Quebec to adopt "whistle blower" legislation in 1997, wherein Quebec workers could report inappropriate government actions without fear of losing their jobs. At the end of his second term, he expressed regret at the lack of cooperation between Quebec's larger and independent unions. He did not seek re-election in 2000.

== Politics ==
In the 1980 Canadian federal election, a candidate named Robert Caron ran for the New Democratic Party in the riding of Louis-Hébert, near Quebec City. For the purposes of this article, it is assumed that this is the same person. Caron was president of Rassemblement populaire, a municipal political party in Quebec City, in the early 1990s.

Shortly before the 2003 Quebec election, he was appointed as president of the Parti Québécois for the national capital area (i.e., Quebec City). He said that he supported the PQ because of the party's social democratic values. He ran as a PQ candidate in 2003, indicating that his priorities were Quebec sovereignty and a modernization of the civil service. He was defeated by Michel Després, the Liberal Party incumbent, in the Jean-Lesage division; across the province, the Liberals defeated the PQ to form a majority government.

== Other ==
After standing down as SPGQ president in 2000, Caron served as president of Centraide Québec and was an advisor to the provincial Ministry of Labour. In 2001, he was appointed to a provincial committee on youth in the workplace. Following the 2003 election, he became director of strategic services at the Commission des relations du travail (CRT).

== Electoral record ==
2003 Quebec general election: Jean-Lesage
Party	Candidate	Votes	%	±%
Liberal	Michel Després	15,547	44.22	
Parti Québécois	Robert Caron	9,408	26.76	
Action démocratique	Aurel Bélanger	8,912	25.35	
Independent	Jean-Yves Desgagnés	714	2.03	
Bloc Pot	Nicolas Frichot	390	1.11	
Marxist–Leninist	Jean Bédard	185	0.53	
Total valid votes		35,156	100.00	
Rejected and declined votes		391		
Turnout		35,547	72.24	
Electors on the lists		49,205		

1980 Canadian federal election: Louis-Hébert
Party	Candidate	Votes	%
Liberal	Dennis Dawson	34,231	64.75
New Democratic	Robert Caron	7,392	13.98
Progressive Conservative	Michel Doyon	5,490	10.39
Rhinoceros	François Ouellet	3,795	7.18
Social Credit	Jean-Paul Rhéaume	1,247	2.36
Union populaire	Henri Laberge	596	1.13
Marxist–Leninist	Lynda Forgues	112	0.21
Total valid votes		52,863	100.00
Total rejected ballots		516	
Turnout		53,379	70.60
Electors on the lists		75,607	
lop.parl.ca

For the purposes of this article, it is assumed that the 1980 candidate is the same person.
