= Frank Hanley =

Canadian politician

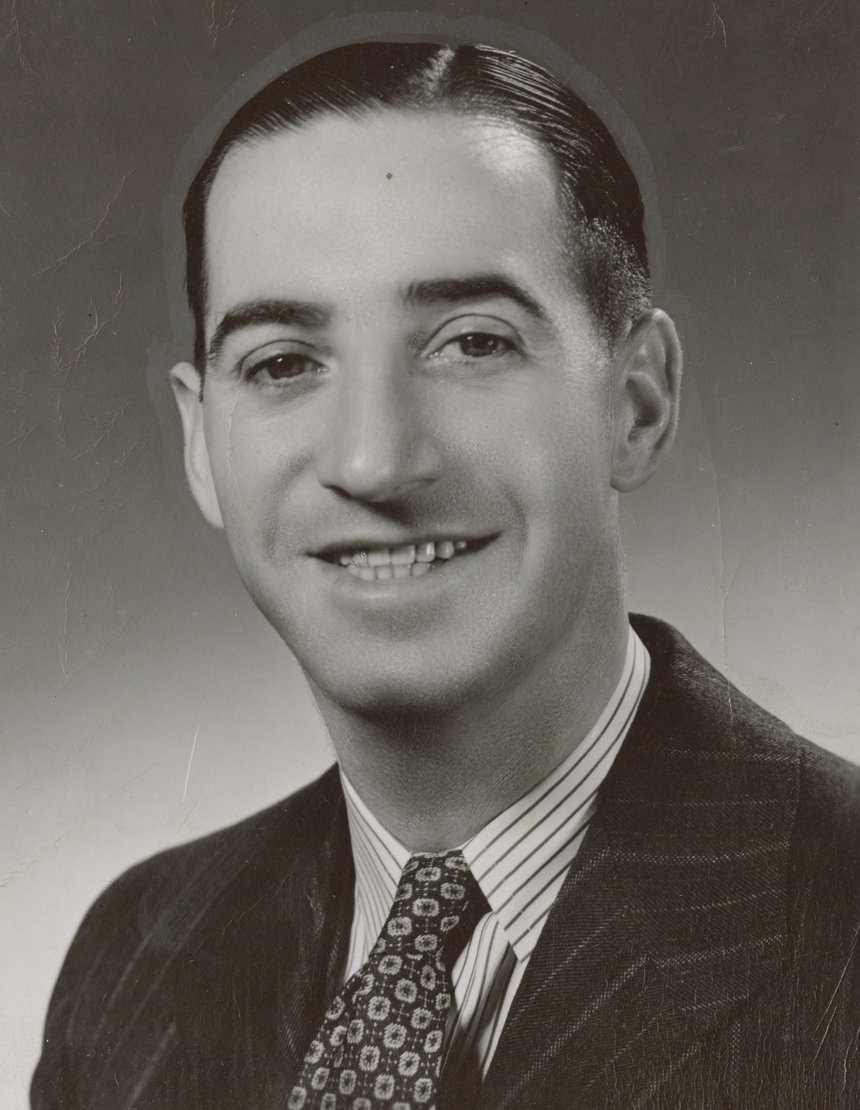

Member of the Legislative Assembly of Quebec for Sainte-Anne
- In office 1966–1970
- Preceded by: District created
- Succeeded by: George Springate

Member of the Legislative Assembly of Quebec for Montréal–Sainte-Anne
- In office 1948–1966
- Preceded by: Thomas Guérin
- Succeeded by: District abolished

Personal details
- Born: April 5, 1909 Montreal, Quebec
- Died: January 23, 2006 (aged 96) Montreal, Quebec
- Party: Independent

Francis Frank Hanley (April 5, 1909 – January 23, 2006) was a Canadian politician of Irish descent from Montreal.

== Background ==
Frank Hanley was born on April 5, 1909, in Montreal. He was the son of John Hanley, brewer, and Stella Johnson and attended St. Ann's Boys School in Montreal. Prior to his political career, he had been a boxer, a jockey and a city public servant. He also served as President of the St. Ann's Community Council. In 1945 the United Irish Societies of Montreal named him the Grand Marshal of the St. Patrick's Parade.

Hanley served simultaneously as a City Councillor in Montreal and as a Member of the Legislative Assembly of Quebec.

Frank Hanley married Noreen (Hanorah) Mines in 1934 and they remained married for more than sixty years.

== Municipal politics ==
Hanley ran as an independent candidate to the Montreal City Council in the district of Sainte-Anne in 1940, and he won. He was re-elected in 1942, 1944, 1947, 1950, 1954, 1957, 1960, 1962, and 1966, but he did not run for re-election in 1970.

== Provincial politics ==
Hanley ran as an independent candidate to the legislature in the district of Montréal–Sainte-Anne against Liberal incumbent Thomas Guérin in 1948, and he won. He was re-elected in 1952, 1956, 1960, and 1962; he was elected in Sainte-Anne in 1966. He was defeated by Liberal George Springate in 1970 and 1973.

== Federal politics ==
He also ran as an independent candidate to the House of Commons of Canada in the district of St. Henri in 1972, but he lost. At one point, he was President of the Progressive Conservative organization in Montreal.

== Death ==
He died on January 23, 2006, in Montreal at the age of 96.

== Electoral record (partial) ==
1966 Quebec general election: Sainte-Anne
Party	Candidate	Votes	%
Independent	Frank Hanley	6,609	38.67
Liberal	Eugène Fournier	4,971	29.09
Union Nationale	Bruno Lépine	4,328	25.32
RIN	André Lalonde	747	4.37
Independent	Marcel Labelle	228	1.33
Ralliement national	Joseph Ranger	208	1.22
Total valid votes		17,091	97.12
Total rejected ballots		507	2.88
Turnout		17,598	53.52
Electors on the lists		32,282	–
