= Robert Trudel =

Canadian politician

Member of the Legislative Assembly of Quebec for Champlain
- In office 1881–1886
- Preceded by: Dominique-Napoléon Saint-Cyr
- Succeeded by: Ferdinand Trudel

Personal details
- Born: February 21, 1820 Sainte-Geneviève-de-Batiscan, Lower Canada
- Died: July 29, 1886 (aged 66) Sainte-Geneviève-de-Batiscan, Quebec
- Party: Conservative

Robert Trudel (February 21, 1820 – July 29, 1886) was a politician in Quebec, Canada.

== Background ==
He was born on February 21, 1820, in Sainte-Geneviève-de-Batiscan, Mauricie.

== Mayor ==
Trudel was Mayor of Sainte-Geneviève-de-Batiscan from 1868 to 1873.

== Member of the legislature ==
Trudel ran as an Independent Conservative candidate in the provincial district of Champlain in 1871 and as a Conservative in the federal district of Champlain in 1874. Each time he lost.

He won a provincial seat in Champlain in 1881.

== Death ==
He died in office on July 29, 1886.
