= Pierre-Calixte Neault =

Canadian politician

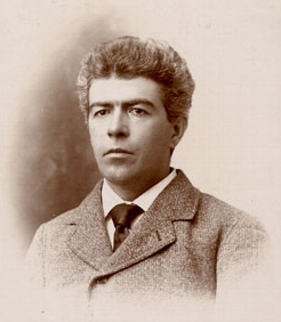

Member of the Legislative Assembly of Quebec for Champlain
- In office 1900–1912
- Preceded by: Pierre Grenier
- Succeeded by: Joseph-Arthur Labissonnière

Personal details
- Born: December 26, 1860 Saint-Maurice, Canada East
- Died: August 30, 1924 (aged 64) Grand-Mère, Quebec
- Party: Liberal

Pierre-Calixte Neault (December 26, 1860 – August 30, 1924) was a politician Quebec, Canada and a two-term Member of the Legislative Assembly of Quebec (MLA).

== Early life ==
He was born on December 26, 1860, in Saint-Maurice, Mauricie.

== City Politics ==
He served as Mayor of Grand-Mère from 1910 to 1916 and in 1919 and 1920.

== Member of the legislature ==
Neault ran as a Liberal candidate in the district of in the provincial district of Champlain in 1900 and won. He was re-elected in 1904 and 1908.

He lost re-election in 1912, against Conservative candidate Joseph-Arthur Labissonnière.

== Death ==
He died on August 30, 1924, in Grand-Mère.

== See also ==
- Champlain Provincial Electoral District
- Mauricie
