= Adriana Szalontai =

Canadian politician

Adriana Szalontai MNA

Member of the National Assembly for Champlain
- Incumbent
- Assumed office October 5, 2026
- Preceded by: Sonia LeBel

Personal details
- Party: Conservative Party

Adriana Szalontai MNA is a Canadian politician who served as a member of the National Assembly of Quebec representing the electoral district of Champlain since 2026. She is a member of the Conservative Party.

Szalontai is originally from Romania and worked in the House of Commons of the United Kingdom.
