= Bruno Bordeleau =

Canadian politician

Member of the Legislative Assembly of Quebec for Champlain
- In office 1919–1925
- Preceded by: Joseph-Arthur Labissonnière
- Succeeded by: William-Pierre Grant

Personal details
- Born: September 4, 1868 Saint-Stanislas, Quebec
- Died: March 23, 1929 (aged 60) Quebec City, Quebec
- Party: Liberal

Bruno Bordeleau (September 4, 1868 – March 23, 1929) was a politician in Quebec, Canada and a Member of the Legislative Assembly of Quebec (MLA).

== Early life ==
Bordeleau was born on September 4, 1868, in Saint-Stanislas, Mauricie. He practiced medicine in Sainte-Thècle.

== Town Politics ==
Bruno Bordeleau was elected mayor of the municipality of Sainte-Thècle from 1912 to 1916. He was chairman of the organizing committee of the festival on July 30, 1922, of the arrival of electricity in the village of Sainte-Thècle.

== Member of the legislature ==
He ran as a Liberal candidate in the provincial district of Champlain in 1916 and won against Conservative incumbent Joseph-Arthur Labissonnière. He was re-elected in 1919 and 1923.

His seat was declared vacant in 1925, after he accepted a position as a registrar.

== Death ==
He died on March 23, 1929, in Quebec City.
