= Saint-Jean-des-Piles =

Coordinates: 46.690°N 72.740°W

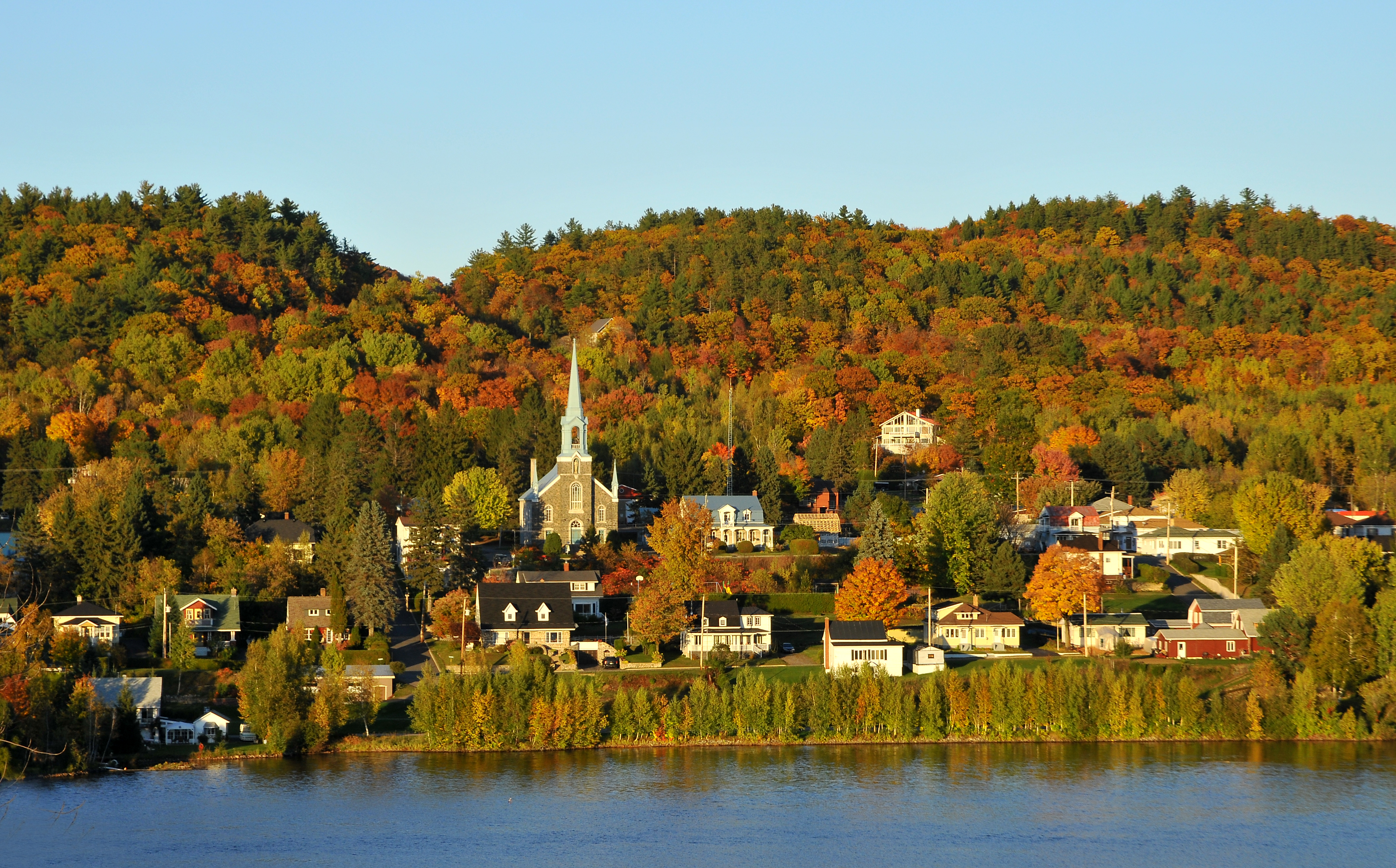
Saint-Jean-des-Piles

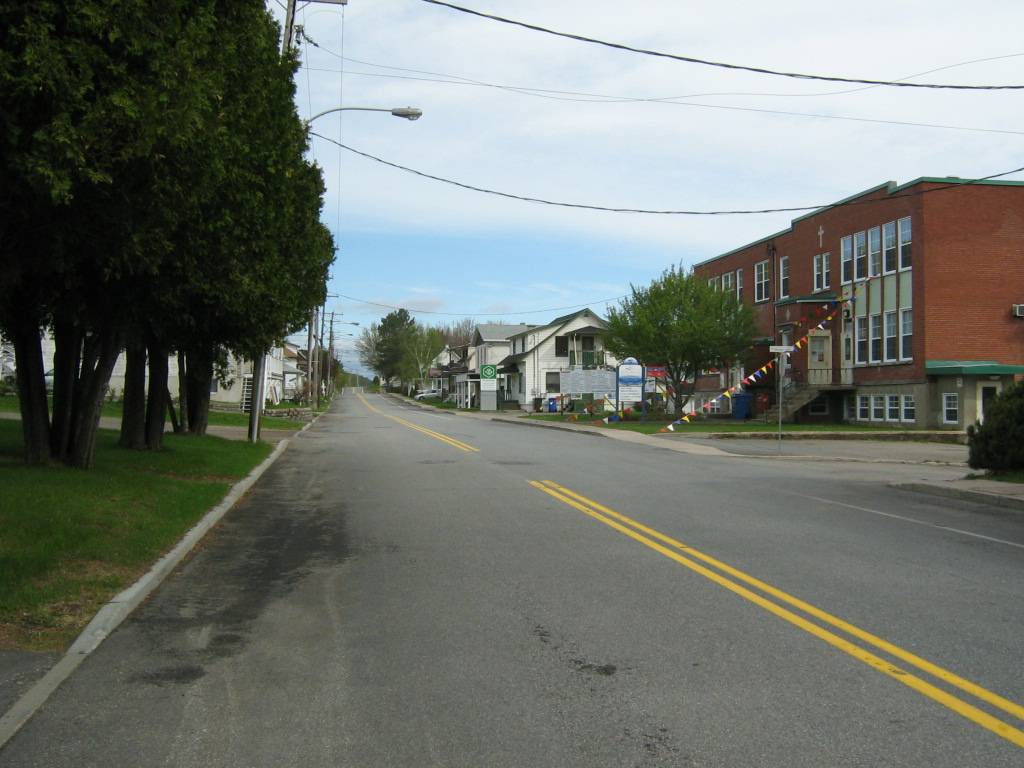
Main street in Saint-Jean-des-Piles

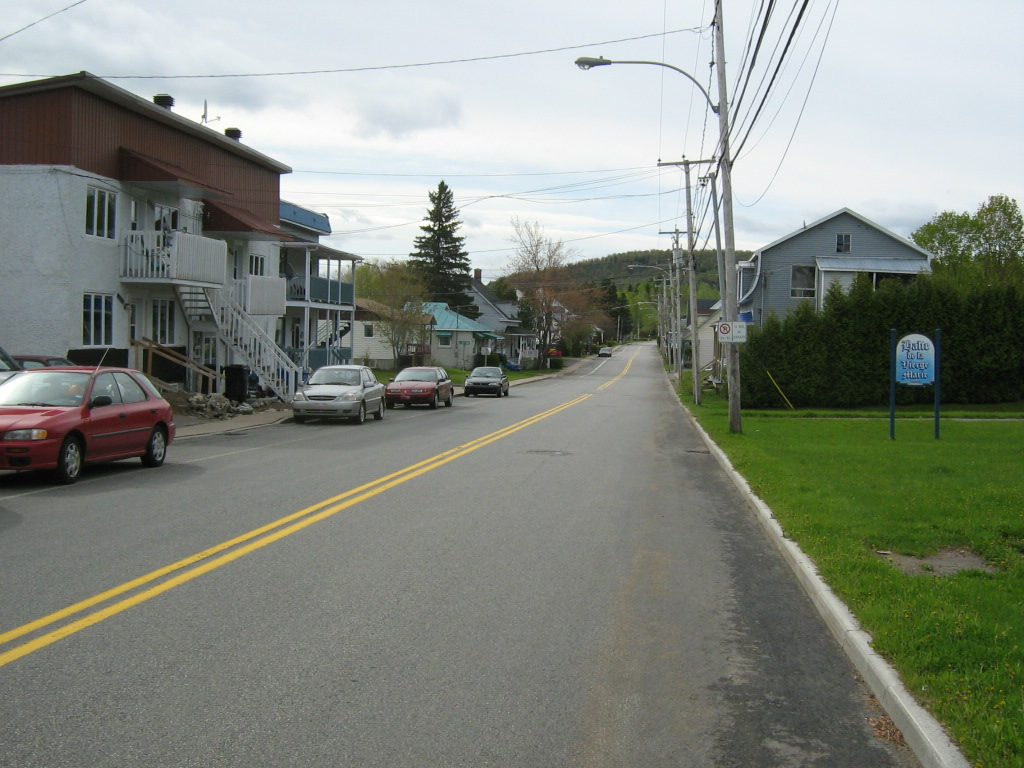
Main street in Saint-Jean-des-Piles

Saint-Jean-des-Piles (French pronunciation: [sɛ̃ ʒɑ̃ de pil]; Canada 1996 Census population 693) is a community in the Canadian province of Quebec. Formerly a separate parish municipality in the Le Centre-de-la-Mauricie Regional County Municipality, it has been one of the seven sectors of the city of Shawinigan since the municipal amalgamation of January 1, 2002.

== Mayors ==
From 1897 to 2001, Saint-Jean-des-Piles had its own mayor and its own city council. The mayors were:

| # | Mayor | Taking Office | Leaving |
| 1 | Isidore Giguère | 1897 | 1899 |
| 2 | Euchariste Crête | 1899 | 1899 |
| 1 | Isidore Giguère | 1899 | 1901 |
| 3 | Joseph Richard | 1901 | 1902 |
| 4 | Narcisse Benoît | 1902 | 1904 |
| 5 | Euchariste Crête | 1904 | 1910 |
| 6 | Uldéric Beaulac | 1910 | 1912 |
| 5 | Euchariste Crête | 1912 | 1913 |
| 7 | Gédéon Béland | 1913 | 1915 |
| 6 | Uldéric Beaulac | 1915 | 1931 |
| 8 | Philippe-Arthur Doucet | 1931 | 1933 |
| 6 | Uldéric Beaulac | 1933 | 1935 |
| 9 | Donat Gélinas | 1935 | 1939 |
| 10 | Paul Cadorette | 1939 | 1947 |
| 9 | Donat Gélinas | 1947 | 1949 |
| 10 | Paul Cadorette | 1949 | 1954 |
| 11 | Maurice Bellemare | 1954 | 1957 |
| 12 | Louis Lizotte | 1957 | 1968 |
| 11 | Maurice Bellemare | 1968 | 1970 |
| 12 | Louis Lizotte | 1970 | 1972 |
| 13 | Patrick Gentes | 1972 | 1973 |
| 14 | Jean-Marie Beaulac | 1973 | 1979 |
| 15 | Michel Lépine | 1979 | 1996 |
| 16 | Angèle Lépine-Rivard | 1996 | 1997 |
| 17 | Jean Trudel | 1997 | 2001 |
