= Yves Beaumier =

Canadian educator and politician (1942–2023)

Member of the National Assembly of Quebec for Nicolet
- In office 1981–1985
- Preceded by: Riding established
- Succeeded by: Maurice Richard

Member of the National Assembly of Quebec for Champlain
- In office 1994–2003
- Preceded by: Pierre-A. Brouillette
- Succeeded by: Noëlla Champagne

Personal details
- Born: December 3, 1942 Trois-Rivières, Quebec, Canada
- Died: October 23, 2023 (aged 80) Trois-Rivières, Quebec, Canada
- Party: Parti Québécois

Yves Beaumier (December 3, 1942 – October 23, 2023) was a Canadian educator and politician. Beaumier was a three-term Member of the National Assembly of Quebec.

== Background ==
Yves Beaumier was born on December 3, 1942, in Trois-Rivières, Quebec and was an educator.

Beaumier died on October 23, 2023, at the age of 80.

== Member of the legislature ==
Beaumier was elected as a Parti Québécois candidate to the provincial legislature in the district of Nicolet in the 1981 election, against Union Nationale incumbent Serge Fontaine.

== Cabinet Member ==
Beaumier served as parliamentary assistant from 1983 to 1985 and was appointed to the Cabinet in 1985, but was defeated by Liberal candidate Maurice Richard in the 1985 election.

== Political comeback ==
Beaumier ran for a seat in the district of Champlain in the 1989, 1994 and 1998 elections and was successful on his two last attempts. He did not run for re-election in the 2003 election.

== Footnotes ==
National Assembly of Quebec
| Preceded by Serge Fontaine (Union Nationale) | MNA, District of Nicolet; 1981–1985 | Succeeded by Maurice Richard (Liberal) |
| Preceded by Pierre-A. Brouillette (Liberal) | MNA, District of Champlain; 1994–2003 | Succeeded by Noëlla Champagne (PQ) |
