= Sonia LeBel =

Canadian politician

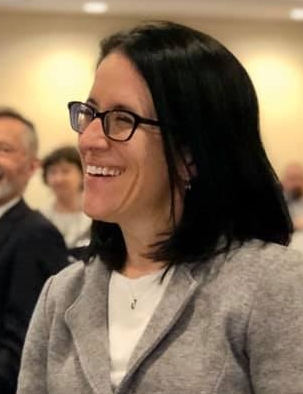
- Lebel in 2019

Member of the National Assembly of Quebec for Champlain
- In office October 18, 2018 – August 27, 2026
- Preceded by: Pierre-Michel Auger
- Succeeded by: Adriana Szalontai

Quebec Minister of Education
- In office September 10, 2025 – October 21, 2026
- Preceded by: Bernard Drainville
- Succeeded by: Joël Arseneau

Quebec President of the Treasury Board
- In office June 22, 2020 – September 10, 2025
- Preceded by: Christian Dubé
- Succeeded by: France-Élaine Duranceau

Quebec Minister responsible for Canadian Relations and the Canadian Francophonie
- In office October 18, 2018 – October 20, 2022
- Preceded by: Jean-Marc Fournier

Quebec Minister responsible for Democratic Institutions and Electoral Reform
- In office September 4, 2019 – October 20, 2022
- Preceded by: Position created
- Succeeded by: Jean-François Roberge (Democratic Institutions)

Quebec Minister of Justice
- In office October 18, 2018 – June 22, 2020
- Preceded by: Stéphanie Vallée
- Succeeded by: Simon Jolin-Barrette

Quebec Minister for the Status of Women
- In office October 18, 2018 – February 5, 2019
- Preceded by: Hélène David
- Succeeded by: Isabelle Charest

Personal details
- Born: June 1968 (age 58) Matane, Quebec, Canada
- Party: Coalition Avenir Québec

Sonia LeBel is a Canadian politician who was elected for the Coalition Avenir Québec to the National Assembly of Quebec in the 2018 provincial election. She represented the electoral district of Champlain as a member of the Coalition Avenir Québec.

As a lawyer, LeBel was chief prosecutor of the Charbonneau Commission into collusion within Quebec's construction industry. She was also the province's Director of Criminal and Penal Prosecutions, focusing on drugs and organized crime.

LeBel was appointed Minister of Justice in the Legault ministry on October 18, 2018, and served until June 22, 2020. She has held various positions in the Legault government, such as Minister of the Francophonie and President of the Treasury Board from 2020 to 2025. She also served as Minister of Education from 2025 to 2026; she did not seek re-election in the 2026 general election.

== Electoral record ==
2022 Quebec general election: Champlain
Party	Candidate	Votes	%	±%
Coalition Avenir Québec	Sonia LeBel	23,513	55.89	+4.03
Conservative	Steve Massicotte	7,383	17.55	+15.75
Parti Québécois	Alexandre Litalien	5,065	12.04	-0.04
Québec solidaire	Marjolaine Trottier	3,775	8.97	-3.99
Liberal	Jérémy Leblanc	2,138	5.08	-13.58
L'Union fait la force	Bianca Nancy Pinel	194	0.46	–
Total valid votes		42,068	98.73	–
Total rejected ballots		542	1.27	–
Turnout		42,610	70.98	
Electors on the lists		60,032		

2018 Quebec general election: Champlain
Party	Candidate	Votes	%	±%
Coalition Avenir Québec	Sonia LeBel	21,154	51.86	+21.43
Liberal	Pierre-Michel Auger	7,610	18.66	-14.78
Québec solidaire	Steven Roy Cullen	5,285	12.96	+7.64
Parti Québécois	Gaëtan Leclerc	4,928	12.08	-18.09
Green	Stéphanie Dufresne	789	1.93	
Conservative	Pierre-Benoit Fortin	733	1.8	
Bloc Pot	Anthony Rouss	164	0.4	
Équipe Autonomiste	Éric Gauthier	126	0.31	
Total valid votes		40,789	98.25	
Total rejected ballots		728	1.75	
Turnout		41,517	70.48	
Eligible voters		58,905		
Coalition Avenir Québec gain from Liberal		Swing		+18.11
Source(s) "Rapport des résultats officiels du scrutin". Élections Québec.
