= Claudette Champagne =

Claudette Champagne is a social activist in the Canadian province of Quebec. She is best known for her tenure as coordinator of the Front commun des personnes assistées sociales du Québec (FCPASQ) in the mid-1990s.

As FCPASQ leader, Champagne was often critical of government decisions in the field of social assistance. She strongly criticized a scheme proposed by the Liberal government of Robert Bourassa in 1993, wherein recipients would be forced to perform several hours of unpaid work to receive their cheques. Champagne argued that this arrangement devalued both paid and voluntary work, adding that the government should concentrate on providing real job opportunities. In the same year, she criticized the government's cutbacks to literacy programs.

Champagne supported the sovereignty option in the 1995 Quebec referendum. After the narrow defeat of the sovereigntist side, she criticized a decision by Jacques Parizeau's Parti Québécois government to cut social assistance by three per cent. Champagne argued that this action contradicted the PQ's pledge not to balance the provincial budget on the backs of the poor. Parizeau argued that reductions were necessary in all departments, in light of anticipated cuts from the federal government.

The following year, Champagne compared the policies of Lucien Bouchard (Parizeau's successor as PQ leader and premier) with those pursued by the right-wing governments of Mike Harris and Ralph Klein in Ontario and Alberta. She called on the government to combat poverty by increasing taxes on corporations and those earning more than $70,000 per year, rather than by imposing further restrictions on low-income Quebecers.

In late 1996, she played a prominent role in setting up a new social alliance called the Coalition nationale sur l'aide sociale. Around the same time, she was succeeded as FCPASQ coordinator by Jean-Yves Desgagnés.

As leader of the FCPASQ, Champagne often devoted her attention to poverty issues in relation to women.
