= Louis Renaud =

Canadian politician

The Hon. Louis Renaud
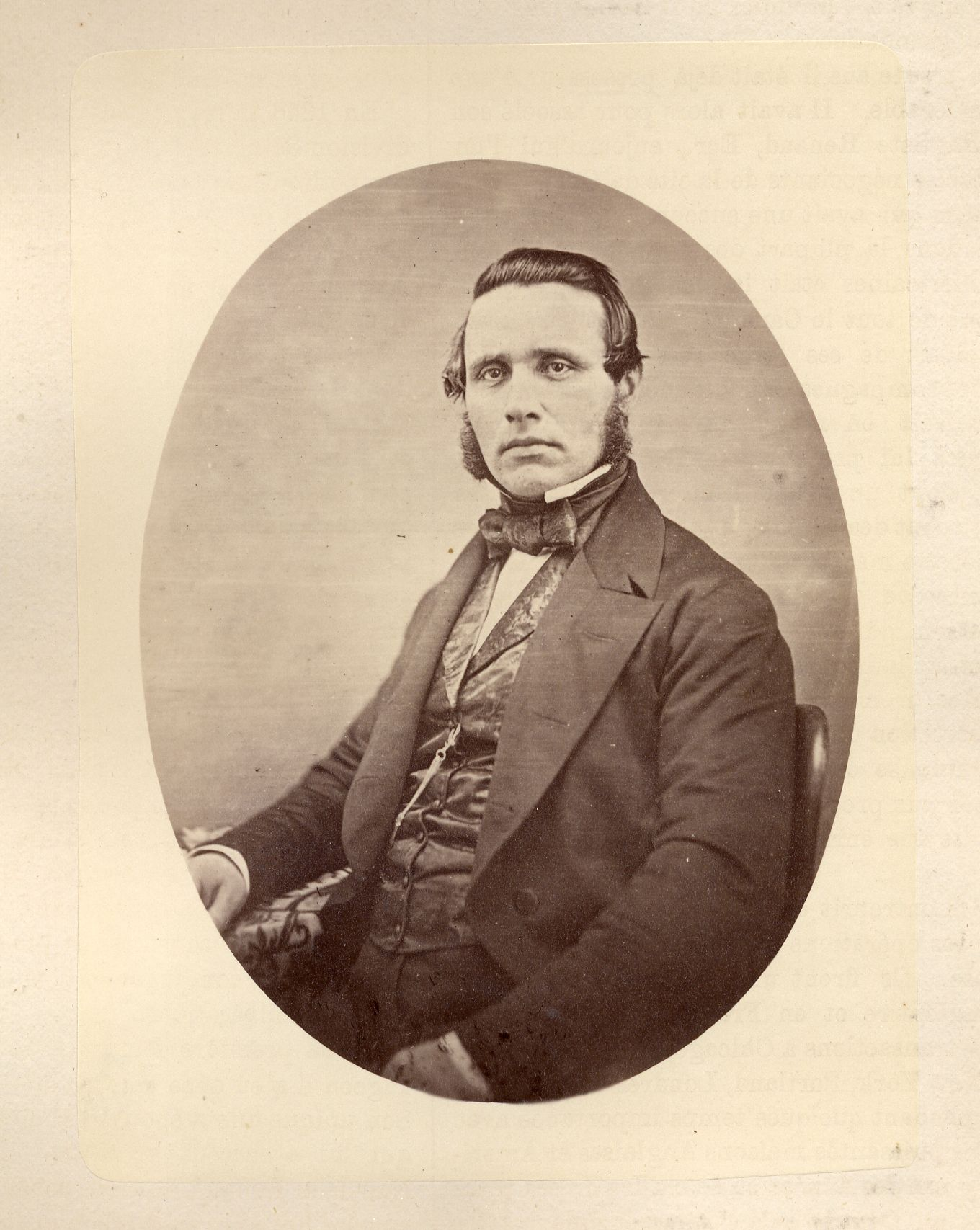

Senator for De Salaberry, Quebec
- In office October 23, 1867 – October 30, 1873
- Appointed by: Royal Proclamation
- Succeeded by: François-Xavier-Anselme Trudel

Personal details
- Born: October 3, 1818 Lachine, Lower Canada
- Died: November 13, 1878 (aged 60) Sainte-Martine, Quebec, Canada
- Party: Conservative

Louis Renaud (October 3, 1818 – November 13, 1878) was a Quebec businessman and political figure. He was a Conservative Party of Canada member of the Senate of Canada representing De Salaberry division from 1867 to 1873.

He was born in Lachine, Lower Canada in 1818 and studied at the Collège de Nicolet. His father became ill and Louis and his brother Jean-Baptiste had to begin work at a young age. He later went into business with his brother and then, around 1856, with John Young. Renaud was heavily involved in the grain and flour trade. In 1856, he was elected to the Legislative Council of the Province of Canada for Salaberry division and he was reelected in 1864 by acclamation. After Confederation, he was named to the Senate and served until he was forced to resign because of ill health in 1873. His son-in-law, François-Xavier-Anselme Trudel, was named to the same seat in the Senate.

He died in Sainte-Martine in 1878 and was buried in the Notre-Dame-des-Neiges Cemetery at Montreal, Quebec.
