= Marcel Gagnon (politician) =

Canadian politician and businessman (1936–2025)

Member of the Canadian Parliament for Saint-Maurice—Champlain
- In office 2004–2006
- Preceded by: District was established in 2003
- Succeeded by: Jean-Yves Laforest ⋅

Member of the Canadian Parliament for Champlain
- In office 2000–2004
- Preceded by: Réjean Lefebvre
- Succeeded by: District was abolished in 2003

Member of the National Assembly of Quebec for Champlain
- In office 1976–1985
- Preceded by: Normand Toupin
- Succeeded by: Pierre-A. Brouillette

Personal details
- Born: April 19, 1936 Sainte-Brigide-d'Iberville, Quebec, Canada
- Died: August 12, 2025 (aged 89)
- Party: Bloc Québécois
- Other political affiliations: Parti Québécois

Marcel Gagnon (French: [maʁsɛl gaɲɔ̃]; April 19, 1936 – August 12, 2025) was a Canadian politician. A businessman, he served as a legislator for both the National Assembly of Quebec and the House of Commons.

== Provincial politics ==
Gagnon ran as a Parti Québécois candidate in 1976 in the provincial riding of Champlain. He was elected with 41% of the vote. He was re-elected in 1981 with 54% of the vote, but was defeated in 1985 with 44% of the vote and finished third in 1989 as an Independent candidate with 19% of the vote.

== Federal politics ==
Gagnon entered federal politics when he was elected as a Member of the Bloc Québécois in 2000 in the riding of Champlain, with 45.3% of the vote against Liberal Julie Boulet (45.2%). He was re-elected in 2004 in the riding of Saint-Maurice—Champlain with 55% of the vote.

During his tenure, he served as the Bloc critic to Seniors and proposed that eligible recipients be signed up to the Guaranteed Income Supplement Program (GIS) without having to make a request.

At one point, Gagnon was critic to the Library of Parliament, the Minister of Agriculture and Agri-Food. He did not run for re-election in 2006, retiring from office at the dissolution of parliament.

== Death ==
Gagnon died on August 12, 2025, at the age of 89.
