= Ferdinand Trudel =

Canadian politician

Ferdinand Trudel was a politician in Quebec, Canada.

== Background ==
He was born on May 4, 1852, in Sainte-Geneviève-de-Batiscan, Mauricie, Canada East.

== Mayor ==
Trudel was Mayor of Saint-Stanislas from 1886 to 1888.

== Member of the legislature ==
Trudel ran as a candidate of Honoré Mercier's Parti National in 1886 and won a seat to the provincial legislature, representing the district of Champlain. In 1890 though, local Bishop Louis-François Richer Laflèche publicly supported the Conservatives. Trudel and his Nationalist colleagues from the Mauricie area were all defeated.

== Federal Politics ==
He also ran in the federal district of Champlain in 1891, but lost.

== Death ==
He died in office on December 22, 1924.

== Footnotes ==
National Assembly of Quebec
Preceded by Robert Trudel (Conservative)	MLA, District of Champlain; 1886–1890	Succeeded by Pierre Grenier (Conservative)
