= Pierre-Michel Auger =

Canadian politician

Pierre Michel Auger

Member of the National Assembly of Quebec for Champlain
- In office April 7, 2014 – August 29, 2018
- Preceded by: Noëlla Champagne
- Succeeded by: Sonia LeBel
- In office April 25, 2007 – November 5, 2008
- Preceded by: Noëlla Champagne
- Succeeded by: Noëlla Champagne

Personal details
- Born: January 11, 1963 (age 63) Shawinigan, Quebec, Canada
- Party: ADQ → Liberal

Pierre Michel Auger (born January 11, 1963) is a Canadian politician, who was a Member of the National Assembly for the electoral district of Champlain from 2007 to 2008 and again since 2014.

== Biography ==
Born in Shawinigan, Quebec, Auger holds a bachelor's degree from the Université du Québec à Trois-Rivières in business administration and did additional courses in a master's degree program in applied sciences and industrial safety and health. Prior to his election, Auger taught at Collège Laflèche in Trois-Rivières, and was also a coordinator at the same college in tourism and hotel management. He was also the owner of a local snow removal company, a hockey coach for several local clubs in several divisions and a member of the Association des restaurateurs du Québec and the Association des hôteliers du Québec.

Running for the Action démocratique du Québec, he was first elected to the National Assembly in the 2007 general election with 45% of the vote. Parti Québécois incumbent Noëlla Champagne finished second with 31% of the vote.

On October 23, 2008, he and fellow ADQ MNA André Riedl crossed the floor to sit as members of the caucus of the governing Liberal Party.

In the 2008 general election, Auger lost re-election against PQ candidate Noëlla Champagne, following which the Liberal government appointed Auger as commissioner and vice-president of the Régie du bâtiment du Québec.

Auger was elected again to the National Assembly in the 2014 general election.
