= Dominique-Napoléon Saint-Cyr =

Canadian politician

Dominique-Napoléon Saint-Cyr (August 4, 1826 – March 3, 1899) was a politician in Quebec, Canada, and a two-term member of the Legislative Assembly of Quebec (MLA).

== Early life ==
He was born on August 4, 1826, in Nicolet, Centre-du-Québec, and was a teacher.

== Political career ==
Saint-Cyr ran as a Conservative candidate in the district of in the provincial district of Champlain in 1875 and won. He succeeded François-Xavier-Anselme Trudel. He was re-elected in 1878 but did not run for re-election in 1881. He was succeeded by Conservative Robert Trudel.

== Death ==
He died on March 3, 1899, in Quebec City.

== See also ==
- Champlain Provincial Electoral District
- Mauricie

National Assembly of Quebec
Preceded by François-Xavier-Anselme Trudel, Conservative	MLA, District of Champlain; 1875–1881	Succeeded by Robert Trudel, Conservative
