= William-Pierre Grant =

Canadian politician

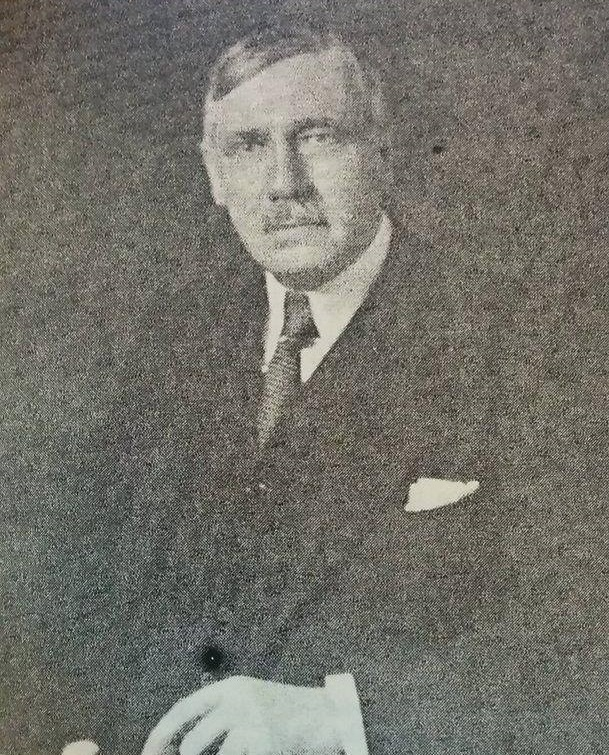

Member of the Legislative Assembly of Quebec for Champlain
- In office 1925–1935
- Preceded by: Bruno Bordeleau
- Succeeded by: Ulphée-Wilbrod Rousseau

Personal details
- Born: June 3, 1872 Saint-François-Xavier-de-Chicoutimi, Quebec
- Died: August 25, 1943 (aged 71) Batiscan, Quebec
- Party: Liberal

William-Pierre Grant (June 3, 1872 – August 25, 1943) was a politician Quebec, Canada and a Member of the Legislative Assembly of Quebec (MLA).

== Early life ==
He was born on June 3, 1872, in Chicoutimi, Saguenay–Lac-Saint-Jean. He made career in the lumber industry.

== Member of the legislature ==
Grant won a by-election as a Liberal candidate in the district of in the provincial district of Champlain in 1925. He was re-elected in 1927 and 1931.

He did not run for re-election in 1935. He was succeeded by Ulphée-Wilbrod Rousseau of the Action libérale nationale.

== Death ==
He died on August 25, 1943, in Batiscan, Mauricie.

== See also ==
- Champlain Provincial Electoral District
- Mauricie
