= François-Xavier-Anselme Trudel =

Canadian politician (1838–1890)

The Hon. François-Xavier-Anselme Trudel
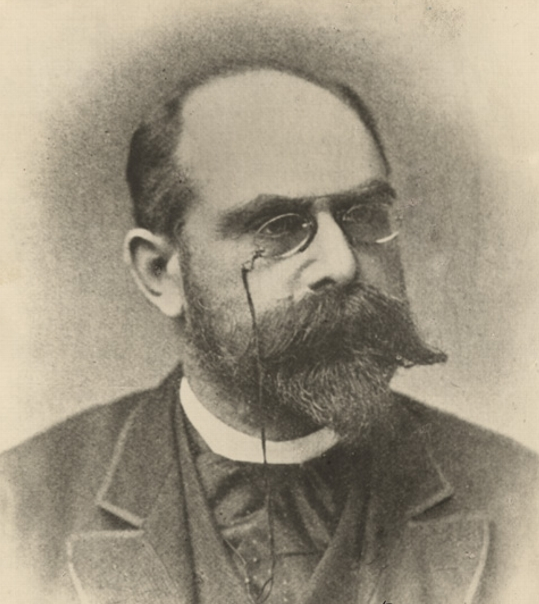

Member of the Legislative Assembly of Quebec for Champlain
- In office 1871–1875
- Preceded by: Jean-Charles Chapais
- Succeeded by: Dominique-Napoléon Saint-Cyr

Senator for De Salaberry
- In office 1873–1890
- Preceded by: Louis Renaud
- Succeeded by: Joseph Tassé

Personal details
- Born: April 28, 1838 Sainte-Anne-de-la-Pérade (La Pérade), Lower Canada
- Died: January 17, 1890 (aged 51) Montreal, Quebec
- Spouse: Marie-Zoé-Aimée Renaud
- Children: 7
- Education: Nicolet College, Nicolet, Quebec

François-Xavier-Anselme Trudel (April 28, 1838 – January 17, 1890) was a politician in Quebec, Canada.

== Background ==
He was born on April 28, 1838, in Sainte-Anne-de-la-Pérade, Mauricie.

== Member of the legislature ==
Trudel was elected as a Conservative candidate to the provincial legislature in the district of Champlain in 1871. He co-authored the Programme Catholique and was an Ultramontanist. He did not run for re-election in 1875.

== Senator ==
He was appointed to the Canadian Senate in 1873. He joined Honoré Mercier's Parti National for a short period of time, but eventually became Conservative again.

== Personal life ==
On April 27, 1864, in Montreal, Trudel wed Marie-Zoé-Aimée, the only daughter of Louis Renaud. At his death, he left four children (three others had died during his lifetime). The eldest, Henri-Louis-François-Xavier-Édouard, became editor of L’Étendard when his father died. His widow, with whom he had had differences in public during their marriage, outlived him by 25 years, dying on April 24, 1915.

== Death ==
Trudel died on January 17, 1890, in the Hotel-Dieu Hospital, at the age of 52.
