= Éric Bondo =

Canadian activist

Éric Bondo is an activist in Quebec best known for his tenure as coordinator of the Front commun des personnes assistées sociales du Québec (FCPASQ) in the mid-2000s.

== Activism ==
Bondo helped create Groupe corporatif de gestion IMPACT, an organization that sought to find employment for students, in early 1995. It was forced to discontinue operations in November of the same year. At its conclusion, the organization's only project was a dépanneur in Montreal.

He succeeded Jean-Yves Desgagnés as FCPASQ coordinator in 2004. In the same year, he led demonstrations against the government of Jean Charest for its plan to cut $44 million from social assistance, primarily targeted at youth. Claude Bechard, the minister responsible for implementing the decision, had argued that many youth would be able to escape social assistance with the help of their parents. Bondo responded that the government was pursuing "punitive measures" and playing up stereotypes of the poor as parasites, adding that many young welfare recipients do not come from wealthy families and would not be able to seek assistance from this source. He introduced a set of counter-proposals in October 2004, including the recognition of a "prestation minimale." In December 2004, he organized a blockade of Jean Charest's constituency office in Sherbrooke.

Bondo also criticized the Charest government's requirement, in 2005, that some persons receiving social assistance be required to find jobs with community organizations. He described this as a "cheap labour" plan for the community organizations and as a cosmetic change that would do nothing to resolve the underlying problems of poverty.

He condemned a plan to build a casino in one of Montreal's poorest neighbourhoods in December 2005, arguing that it would both increase poverty, by enticing low-income residents to gamble their social assistance cheques, and double or triple the crime rate.

His term as FCPASQ co-ordinator appears to have ended in 2006.
