= Front commun des personnes assistées sociales du Québec =

Canadian activist organization

The Front commun des personnes assistées sociales du Québec is an activist organization in the Canadian province of Quebec, established in 1974. Its purpose is to represent the interests of Quebec residents receiving social assistance.

== Prominent figures ==
- Fernande Brosseau (coordinator, late 1980s). Brosseau worked with Françoise David against strict social security reforms introduced by the government of Robert Bourassa in 1988. In October of that year, she helped organize a demonstration by four thousand people in Montreal. The following year, she criticized the government's plans to crack down on drug abuse among welfare recipients as heavy-handed and said the policy would be challenged in the courts. She was particularly focused on women's issues in relation to poverty.
- Jean-Yves Desgagnés (coordinator, early 1990s and 1996-2004)
- Claudette Champagne (coordinator, mid-1990s)
- Éric Bondo (coordinator, mid-2000s)
- Thérèse Spénard
