= Ulphée-Wilbrod Rousseau =

Canadian politician

Member of the Legislative Assembly of Quebec for Champlain
- In office 1935–1939
- Preceded by: William-Pierre Grant
- Succeeded by: Joseph-Philias Morin

Personal details
- Born: January 26, 1882 Sainte-Geneviève-de-Batiscan, Quebec
- Died: September 11, 1967 (aged 85) Joliette, Quebec
- Party: Action libérale nationale Union Nationale

Ulphée-Wilbrod Rousseau (January 26, 1882 – September 11, 1967) was a politician Quebec, Canada and a two-term Member of the Legislative Assembly of Quebec (MLA).

== Early life ==
He was born on January 26, 1882, in Sainte-Geneviève-de-Batiscan, Mauricie. He made career in the construction business.

== Member of the legislature ==
Rousseau ran as an Action libérale nationale candidate in the district of Champlain in the 1935 provincial election and won. He became a member of the Union Nationale and was re-elected as such in 1936.

He did not run for re-election in 1939.

== Death ==
He died on September 11, 1967, in Joliette.

== See also ==
- Champlain Provincial Electoral District
- Mauricie
