= Joseph-Philias Morin =

Canadian politician

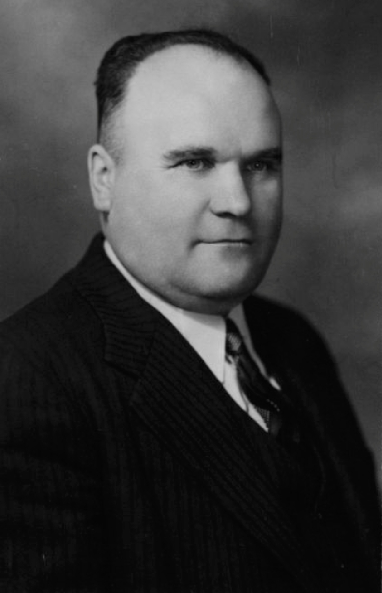

Member of the Legislative Assembly of Quebec for Champlain
- In office 1939–1944
- Preceded by: Ulphée-Wilbrod Rousseau
- Succeeded by: Maurice Bellemare

Personal details
- Born: March 19, 1899 Saint-Maurice (Mauricie), Quebec
- Died: January 13, 1945 (aged 45) Cap-de-la-Madeleine, Quebec
- Party: Union Nationale

Joseph-Philias Morin (March 19, 1899 – January 13, 1945) was a politician in Quebec, Canada and a one-term Member of the Legislative Assembly of Quebec (MLA).

== Early life ==
He was born on March 19, 1899, in Saint-Maurice, Mauricie. He made his career in the construction business.

== Member of the legislature ==
Morin served as a Councilmember in Cap-de-la-Madeleine from 1929 to 1933.

== Member of the legislature ==
He won election as a Union Nationale candidate in the district of Champlain in the 1939 provincial election.

He did not run for re-election in 1944, and was succeeded by Maurice Bellemare.

== Death ==
He died on January 13, 1945, in Cap-de-la-Madeleine.

== See also ==
- Champlain Provincial Electoral District
- Mauricie
