= Serge Fontaine =

Canadian politician

Member of the National Assembly of Quebec for Nicolet-Yamaska
- In office 1976–1981
- Preceded by: Benjamin Faucher
- Succeeded by: District abolished in 1981

Personal details
- Born: September 17, 1947 (age 78) Villeroy, Quebec, Canada
- Party: Coalition Avenir Québec
- Other political affiliations: Conservative; Union Nationale

Serge Fontaine (born September 17, 1947) is a Canadian politician in the province of Quebec.

== Background ==
He was born on September 17, 1947, in Villeroy, Quebec and was an attorney.

== Political career ==
Fontaine was elected as a Union Nationale candidate to the provincial legislature in the district of Nicolet with 35% of the vote in the 1976 election. He served as his party's Deputy House Whip in 1980 and 1981. He finished a close third with 32% of the vote against Parti Québécois candidate Yves Beaumier and lost in the 1981 election.

Fontaine helped found the modern version of the Conservative Party of Quebec and served for a time as its leader. In November 2011, he resigned and joined the Coalition Avenir Québec.
