= Pierre Grenier =

Canadian politician

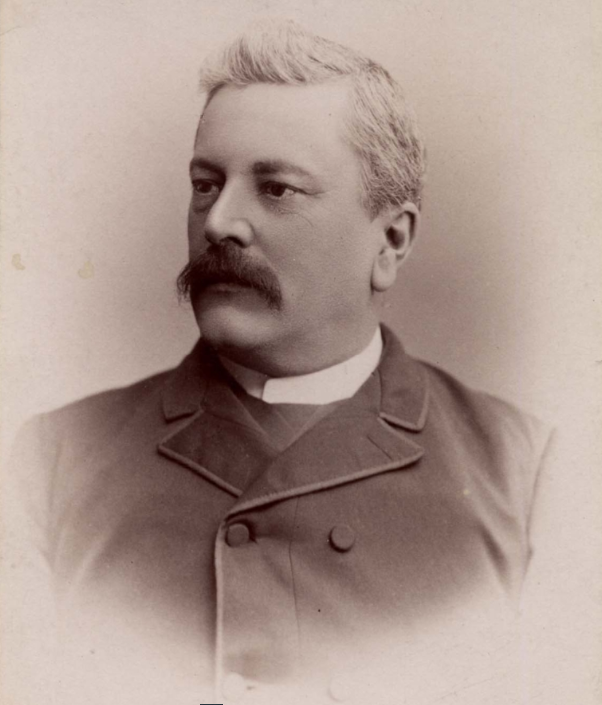
Pierre Grenier

Pierre Grenier was a politician from Quebec, Canada and a Member of the Legislative Assembly of Quebec (MLA).

== Early life ==
He was born on June 11, 1837, in Trois-Rivières, Mauricie, Lower Canada and was a physician.

== Political career ==
He ran as a Conservative candidate in the district of in the provincial district of Champlain in 1890 and won with the backing of local Catholic Bishop Louis-François Richer Laflèche. He succeeded Parti National incumbent Ferdinand Trudel.

Grenier was re-elected in 1892 and 1897.

He did not run for re-election in 1900. He was succeeded by Liberal Pierre-Calixte Neault.

== Death ==
He died on December 23, 1903, in Champlain.

== See also ==
- Champlain Provincial Electoral District
- Mauricie

National Assembly of Quebec
Preceded by Ferdinand Trudel, Parti National	MLA, District of Champlain; 1890–1900	Succeeded by Pierre-Calixte Neault, Liberal
