= Champlain (provincial electoral district) =

Provincial electoral district in Quebec, Canada

Coordinates: 46.544°N 72.386°W

Quebec electoral district

Provincial electoral district
- Legislature: National Assembly of Quebec
MNA
Adriana Szalontai
Conservative
- District created: 1867
- First contested: 1867
- Last contested: 2026

Demographics
- Population (2011): 60,085
- Electors (2012): 48,609
- Area (km²): 934.2
- Pop. density (per km²): 64.3
- Census division: Francheville (part)
- Census subdivision(s): Batiscan, Champlain, Sainte-Anne-de-la-Pérade, Sainte-Geneviève-de-Batiscan, Saint-Luc-de-Vincennes, Saint-Maurice, Saint-Narcisse, Saint-Prosper-de-Champlain, Saint-Stanislas, Trois-Rivières (part)

Champlain (French pronunciation: [ʃɑ̃plɛ̃]) is a provincial electoral riding in the Mauricie region of Quebec, Canada, which elects members to the National Assembly of Quebec. It notably includes the eastern portions of the city of Trois-Rivières as well as Saint-Tite, Saint-Maurice and Sainte-Thècle. Its boundaries have remained the same since the 1973 election. However, the boundaries changed for the 2018 election as it gained Hérouxville, Lac-aux-Sables, Notre-Dame-de-Montauban, Saint-Adelphe, Sainte-Thècle, Saint-Séverin, and Saint-Tite from Laviolette.

It is named after the founder of Quebec City in 1608, Samuel de Champlain.

It was created for the 1867 election, and an electoral district of that name existed even earlier: see Champlain (Lower Canada) and Champlain (Province of Canada electoral district).

In the April 14, 2003 election there was a tie between PQ candidate Noëlla Champagne and Liberal candidate Pierre-A. Brouillette; although the initial tally was 11,867 to 11,859, a judicial recount produced a tally of 11,852 each. A new election was held on May 20 and was won by Champagne by a margin of 642 votes.

== Members of the Legislative Assembly / National Assembly ==
Legislature	Years	Member	Party
1st	1867–1867	John Jones Ross	Conservative
1st	1867–1871	Jean-Charles Chapais	Conservative
2nd	1871–1875	François-Xavier-Anselme Trudel	Conservative
3rd	1875–1878	Dominique-Napoléon Saint-Cyr	Conservative
4th	1878–1881	Dominique-Napoléon Saint-Cyr	Conservative
5th	1881–1886†	Robert Trudel	Conservative
6th	1886–1890	Ferdinand Trudel	Parti national
7th	1890–1892	Pierre Grenier	Conservative
8th	1892–1897	Pierre Grenier	Conservative
9th	1897–1900	Pierre Grenier	Conservative
10th	1900–1904	Pierre-Calixte Neault	Liberal
11th	1904–1908	Pierre-Calixte Neault	Liberal
12th	1908–1912	Pierre-Calixte Neault	Liberal
13th	1912–1916	Joseph-Arthur Labissonnière	Conservative
14th	1916–1919	Bruno Bordeleau	Liberal
15th	1919–1923	Bruno Bordeleau	Liberal
16th	1923–1925	Bruno Bordeleau	Liberal
16th	1925–1927	William-Pierre Grant	Liberal
17th	1927–1931	William-Pierre Grant	Liberal
18th	1931–1935	William-Pierre Grant	Liberal
19th	1935–1936	Ulphée-Wilbrod Rousseau	Action libérale nationale
20th	1936–1939	Ulphée-Wilbrod Rousseau	Union Nationale
21st	1939–1944	Joseph-Philias Morin	Union Nationale
22nd	1944–1948	Maurice Bellemare	Union Nationale
23rd	1948–1952	Maurice Bellemare	Union Nationale
24th	1952–1956	Maurice Bellemare	Union Nationale
25th	1956–1960	Maurice Bellemare	Union Nationale
26th	1960–1962	Maurice Bellemare	Union Nationale
27th	1962–1966	Maurice Bellemare	Union Nationale
28th	1966–1970	Maurice Bellemare	Union Nationale
29th	1970–1973	Normand Toupin	Liberal
30th	1973–1976	Normand Toupin	Liberal
31st	1976–1981	Marcel Gagnon	Parti Québécois
32nd	1981–1985	Marcel Gagnon	Parti Québécois
33rd	1985–1989	Pierre-A. Brouillette	Liberal
34th	1989–1994	Pierre-A. Brouillette	Liberal
35th	1994–1998	Yves Beaumier	Parti Québécois
36th	1998–2003	Yves Beaumier	Parti Québécois
37th	2003–2003	No winner	Vacant
37th	2003–2007	Noëlla Champagne	Parti Québécois
38th	2007–2008	Pierre-Michel Auger	Action démocratique
38th	2008–2008	Pierre-Michel Auger	Liberal
39th	2008–2012	Noëlla Champagne	Parti Québécois
40th	2012–2014	Noëlla Champagne	Parti Québécois
41st	2014–2018	Pierre-Michel Auger	Liberal
42nd	2018–2022	Sonia LeBel	Coalition Avenir Québec
43rd	2022–2026	Sonia LeBel	Coalition Avenir Québec
44th	2026–Present	Adriana Szalontai	Conservative

== Election results ==
2026 Quebec general election
** Preliminary results — Not yet official **
Party	Candidate	Votes	%	±%
Conservative	Adriana Szalontai	12,690	29.29	+11.74
Parti Québécois	René Branchaud	12,499	28.85	+16.81
Coalition Avenir Québec	Marie-Eve Myrand	7,385	17.04	–38.85
Liberal	Annie Pronovost	6,514	15.03	+9.95
Québec solidaire	Katherine Heckersbruch	2,878	6.64	–2.33
Climat Québec	Martine Ouellet	988	2.28	N/A
Parti nul	Lionel Bonhomet	222	0.51	N/A
Démocratie directe	Christine Dion	154	0.36	N/A
Total valid votes		43,330	98.48	–0.25
Total rejected ballots		671	1.52	+0.25
Turnout		44,001	72.35	+1.37
Electors on the lists		60,815		
Conservative gain from Coalition Avenir Québec		Swing		–2.54
Source: Élections Québec

2022 Quebec general election
Party	Candidate	Votes	%	±%
Coalition Avenir Québec	Sonia LeBel	23,513	55.89	+4.03
Conservative	Steve Massicotte	7,383	17.55	+15.75
Parti Québécois	Alexandre Litalien	5,065	12.04	-0.04
Québec solidaire	Marjolaine Trottier	3,775	8.97	-3.99
Liberal	Jérémy Leblanc	2,138	5.08	-13.58
L'Union fait la force	Bianca Nancy Pinel	194	0.46	–
Total valid votes		42,068	98.73	–
Total rejected ballots		542	1.27	–
Turnout		42,610	70.98	
Electors on the lists		60,032		

2018 Quebec general election
Party	Candidate	Votes	%	±%
Coalition Avenir Québec	Sonia LeBel	21,154	51.86	+21.43
Liberal	Pierre-Michel Auger	7,610	18.66	-14.78
Québec solidaire	Steven Roy Cullen	5,285	12.96	+7.64
Parti Québécois	Gaëtan Leclerc	4,928	12.08	-18.09
Green	Stéphanie Dufresne	789	1.93	
Conservative	Pierre-Benoit Fortin	733	1.8	
Bloc Pot	Anthony Rouss	164	0.4	
Équipe Autonomiste	Éric Gauthier	126	0.31	
Total valid votes		40,789	98.25	
Total rejected ballots		728	1.75	
Turnout		41,517	70.48	
Eligible voters		58,905		
Coalition Avenir Québec gain from Liberal		Swing		+18.11
Source(s) "Rapport des résultats officiels du scrutin". Élections Québec.

2014 Quebec general election
Party	Candidate	Votes	%	±%
Liberal	Pierre-Michel Auger	11,615	33.44	+11.36
Coalition Avenir Québec	Andrew D'Amours	10,569	30.43	-2.52
Parti Québécois	Noëlla Champagne	10,481	30.17	-6.56
Québec solidaire	Lucie Favreau	1,848	5.32	+1.17
Option nationale	Nicolas Lavigne-Lefebvre	222	0.64	-2.28
Total valid votes		34,735	98.19	–
Total rejected ballots		642	1.81	+0.34
Turnout		35,377	72.23	-4.91
Electors on the lists		48,978	–	–
Liberal gain from Parti Québécois		Swing		+8.96

2012 Quebec general election
Party	Candidate	Votes	%	±%
Parti Québécois	Noëlla Champagne	13,624	36.73	-4.25
Coalition Avenir Québec	Pierre Jackson	12,220	32.95	+11.05*
Liberal	Marc-Antoine Trudel	8,188	22.08	-12.16
Québec solidaire	Yves Sansregret	1,541	4.15	+1.97
Option nationale	Émilie Joly	1,084	2.92	–
Independent	Eric L'Abbée	319	0.86	–
Équipe Autonomiste	Jessy Trottier	113	0.30	–
Total valid votes		37,089	98.52	–
Total rejected ballots		556	1.48	–
Turnout		37,645	77.14	+12.76
Electors on the lists		48,799	–	–
Parti Québécois hold		Swing		-7.65

* Result compared to Action démocratique

2008 Quebec general election
Party	Candidate	Votes	%	±%
Parti Québécois	Noëlla Champagne	12,317	40.98	+10.29
Liberal	Pierre-Michel Auger	10,293	34.24	+12.68
Action démocratique	Luc Arvisais	6,582	21.90	-22.91
Québec solidaire	Myriam Fauteux	654	2.18	-0.75
Independent	Jean-Pierre Grenier	211	0.70	–
Total valid votes		30,057	98.28	–
Total rejected ballots		526	1.72	–
Turnout		30,583	64.38	-12.16
Electors on the lists		47,501	–	–

2007 Quebec general election
Party	Candidate	Votes	%	±%
Action démocratique	Pierre-Michel Auger	15,872	44.81	+20.22
Parti Québécois	Noëlla Champagne	10,871	30.69	-7.66
Liberal	Christian Fortin	7,635	21.56	-14.35
Québec solidaire	Alex Noël	1,039	2.93	+2.54*
Total valid votes		35,417	98.99	–
Total rejected ballots		360	1.01	–
Turnout		35,777	76.54	+18.84
Electors on the lists		46,741	–	–

* Result compared to UFP

Quebec provincial by-election, May 20, 2003
Party	Candidate	Votes	%	±%
Parti Québécois	Noëlla Champagne	10,073	38.35	+3.41
Liberal	Pierre-A. Brouillette	9,431	35.91	+0.97
Action démocratique	Rock Laviolette	6,459	24.59	-4.51
Green	Richard Lahaie	126	0.48	–
UFP	Lucie Favreau	103	0.39	–
Christian Democracy	Gilles Noël	73	0.28	–
Total valid votes		26,265	99.24	–
Total rejected ballots		202	0.76	–
Turnout		26,467	57.70	-17.94
Electors on the lists		45,869	–	–

2003 Quebec general election
Party	Candidate	Votes	%	±%
Parti Québécois	Noëlla Champagne	11,852	34.94	-12.35
Liberal	Pierre-A. Brouillette	11,852	34.94	-0.66
Action démocratique	Rock Laviolette	9,871	29.10	+12.76
Independent	Martial Toupin	344	1.01	+0.61
Total valid votes		33,919	98.17	–
Total rejected ballots		632	1.83	–
Turnout		34,551	75.64	-6.79
Electors on the lists		45,681	–	–

1998 Quebec general election
Party	Candidate	Votes	%
Parti Québécois	Yves Beaumier	17,254	47.29
Liberal	Alain Croteau	12,990	37.90
Action démocratique	Yves Gélinas	5,962	16.34
Independent	Martial Toupin	146	0.40
Socialist Democracy	Claude Mercier	137	0.38
Total valid votes		36,489	98.93
Total rejected ballots		396	1.07
Turnout		36,885	82.43
Electors on the lists		44,747	–

1995 Quebec referendum
Side	Votes	%
Oui	24,534	60.58
Non	15,967	39.42

1994 Quebec general election
Party	Candidate	Votes	%
Parti Québécois	Yves Beaumier	14,929	42.26
Liberal	Pierre Brouillette	10,943	30.98
Action démocratique	Norman Houle	8,953	25.43
Natural Law	André Bouchard	274	0.78
Development	Martial Toupin	229	0.65
Total valid votes		35,328	98.43
Total rejected ballots		562	1.57
Turnout		35,890	83.64
Electors on the lists		42,908	–

1992 Charlottetown Accord referendum
Side	Votes	%
Non	22,488	63.86
Oui	12,725	36.14

1989 Quebec general election
Party	Candidate	Votes	%
Liberal	Pierre Brouillette	14,325	45.61
Parti Québécois	Yves Beaumier	14,929	35.14
Independent PQ	Marcel Gagnon	6,046	19.25
Total valid votes		31,046	97.13
Total rejected ballots		929	2.87
Turnout		32,335	77.91
Electors on the lists		41,505	–

1985 Quebec general election
Party	Candidate	Votes	%
Liberal	Pierre Brouillette	16,652	51.80
Parti Québécois	Marcel Gagnon	14,224	44.25
New Democratic	Jean-Claude Landry	1,269	3,95
Total valid votes		32,145	98.35
Total rejected ballots		539	1.65
Turnout		32,684	80.29
Electors on the lists		40,706	–

1981 Quebec general election
Party	Candidate	Votes	%
Parti Québécois	Marcel Gagnon	17,789	53.58
Liberal	Blaise Soucy	12,852	38.71
Union Nationale	Claude Gravel	2,462	7.41
Marxist–Leninist	Lucie Derosiers	101	0.30
Total valid votes		33,204	98.88
Total rejected ballots		376	1.12
Turnout		33,580	84.64
Electors on the lists		39,674	–

1980 Quebec referendum
Side	Votes	%
Non	18,544	56.04
Oui	14,549	43.96

1976 Quebec general election
Party	Candidate	Votes	%
Parti Québécois	Marcel Gagnon	12,514	40.73
Liberal	Normand Toupin	8,086	26.32
Union Nationale	Gilles Gauthier	7,882	25.66
Ralliement créditiste	Robert Fournier	2,240	7.29
Total valid votes		30,722	98.61
Total rejected ballots		434	1.39
Turnout		31,156	87.67
Electors on the lists		35,536	–

1973 Quebec general election
Party	Candidate	Votes	%
Liberal	Normand Toupin	14,698	54.91
Parti Québécois	Prudent Boisclair	5,877	21.96
Ralliement créditiste	Philippe Cossette	4,575	17.09
Union Nationale	Fernand St-Germain	1,616	6.04
Total valid votes		26,766	98.57
Total rejected ballots		387	1.43
Turnout		27,153	82.79
Electors on the lists		32,796	–

1970 Quebec general election
Party	Candidate	Votes	%
Liberal	Normand Toupin	9,334	33.06
Union Nationale	Paul Rocheleau	6,800	21.96
Ralliement créditiste	Philippe Cossette	6,696	23.72
Parti Québécois	Omer Gratton	5,403	19.14
Total valid votes		28,233	98.82
Total rejected ballots		336	1.18
Turnout		28,569	86.96
Electors on the lists		32,854	–

1966 Quebec general election
Party	Candidate	Votes	%
Union Nationale	Maurice Bellemare	15,102	57.71
Liberal	Normand Toupin	9,862	37.69
Ralliement national	Viateur Paré	1,203	4.60
Total valid votes		26,167	98.54
Total rejected ballots		389	1.46
Turnout		26,556	86.54
Electors on the lists		30,687	–

1962 Quebec general election
Party	Candidate	Votes	%
Union Nationale	Maurice Bellemare	12,346	52.74
Liberal	J.-Réal Desrosiers	11,046	47.26
Total valid votes		23,410	99.13
Total rejected ballots		206	0.87
Turnout		23,616	90.97
Electors on the lists		25,960	–

1960 Quebec general election
Party	Candidate	Votes	%
Union Nationale	Maurice Bellemare	11,572	50.32
Liberal	Joseph-Alfred Mongrain	11,425	49.68
Total valid votes		22,997	99.18
Total rejected ballots		190	0.82
Turnout		23,187	90.97
Electors on the lists		25,238	–

1956 Quebec general election
Party	Candidate	Votes	%
Union Nationale	Maurice Bellemare	12,579	58.93
Liberal	Honorius Francoeur	11,425	41.07
Total valid votes		21,344	99.31
Total rejected ballots		149	0.69
Turnout		21,493	90.32
Electors on the lists		23,796	–

1952 Quebec general election
Party	Candidate	Votes	%
Union Nationale	Maurice Bellemare	11,634	59.94
Liberal	Jacques Lacoursière	7,774	40.06
Total valid votes		19,408	99.38
Total rejected ballots		121	0.62
Turnout		19,529	88.79
Electors on the lists		21,995	–

1948 Quebec general election
Party	Candidate	Votes	%
Union Nationale	Maurice Bellemare	11,465	68.52
Liberal	Joseph-Raoul Saint-Laurent	4,133	24.70
Union des électeurs	Albert Boucher	1,135	6.78
Total valid votes		16,733	99.23
Total rejected ballots		129	0.77
Turnout		16,862	86.46
Electors on the lists		19,503	–

1944 Quebec general election
Party	Candidate	Votes	%
Union Nationale	Maurice Bellemare	7,632	54.41
Liberal	Albert Crête	5,138	36.63
Bloc populaire	Romauld-D. Cossette	1,258	8.97
Total valid votes		14,028	99.14
Total rejected ballots		149	0.86
Turnout		14,149	81.92
Electors on the lists		17,272	–

1939 Quebec general election
Party	Candidate	Votes	%
Union Nationale	Joseph-Philias Morin	2,989	50.70
Liberal	Isidore Halley	2,906	49.30
Total valid votes		5,895	98.61
Total rejected ballots		83	1.39
Turnout		5,978	76.15
Electors on the lists		7,850	–

1936 Quebec general election
Party	Candidate	Votes	%
Union Nationale	Ulphée-Wilbrod Rousseau	4,068	61.38
Liberal	Napoléon Tessier	2,560	38.62
Total valid votes		6,628	98.91
Total rejected ballots		73	1.09
Turnout		6,701	86.91
Electors on the lists		7,710	–

1935 Quebec general election
Party	Candidate	Votes	%
Action libérale nationale	Ulphée-Wilbrod Rousseau	3,257	56.20
Liberal	Robert-Laurent Grant	2,538	43.80
Total valid votes		5,795	99.71
Total rejected ballots		17	0.29
Turnout		5,812	76.09
Electors on the lists		7,638	–

1931 Quebec general election
Party	Candidate	Votes	%
Liberal	William-Pierre Grant	3,125	53.91
Conservative	Joseph-Albert Nadeau	2,672	46.09
Total valid votes		5,797	98.64
Total rejected ballots		80	0.36
Turnout		5,877	76.09
Electors on the lists		6,741	–

1927 Quebec general election
Party	Candidate	Votes	%
Liberal	William-Pierre Grant	5,304	55.14
Conservative	Auguste Désilets	4,315	44.86
Total valid votes		9,619	99.14
Total rejected ballots		83	0.86
Turnout		9,702	74.38
Electors on the lists		13,044	–

Quebec provincial by-election, 1925
Party	Candidate	Votes	%
Liberal	William-Pierre Grant	4,000	53.75
Conservative	Auguste Désilets	3,442	46.25
Total valid votes		7,442	99.40
Total rejected ballots		45	0.60
Turnout		7,487	61.74
Electors on the lists		12,127	–

1923 Quebec general election
Party	Candidate	Votes	%
Liberal	Bruno Bordeleau	4,084	57.43
Conservative	Joseph-Arthur Labissonnière	3,027	42.57
Total valid votes		7,111	99.08
Total rejected ballots		66	0.92
Turnout		7,177	61.23
Electors on the lists		11,664	–

1919 Quebec general election
Party	Candidate	Votes	
Liberal	Bruno Bordeleau	Acclaimed	
Electors on the lists		10,561	–

1916 Quebec general election
Party	Candidate	Votes	%
Liberal	Bruno Bordeleau	4,923	59.06
Conservative	Joseph-Arthur Labissonnière	3,412	40.94
Total valid votes		8,335	99.57
Total rejected ballots		36	0.43
Turnout		8,371	79.56
Electors on the lists		10,522	–

1912 Quebec general election
Party	Candidate	Votes	%
Conservative	Joseph-Arthur Labissonnière	3,784	50.59
Liberal	Pierre-Calixe Neault	3,695	49.41
Total valid votes		7,479	99.03
Total rejected ballots		36	0.97
Turnout		7,552	73.71
Electors on the lists		10,245	–

1908 Quebec general election
Party	Candidate	Votes	%
Liberal	Pierre-Calixe Neault	3,332	53.03
Conservative	Arthur Béliveau	2,951	46.97
Total valid votes		6,283	99.26
Total rejected ballots		47	0.74
Turnout		6,330	72.63
Electors on the lists		8,715	–

1904 Quebec general election
Party	Candidate	Votes	%
Liberal	Pierre-Calixe Neault	2,742	57.32
Conservative	Émile Lacoursière	2,042	42.68
Total valid votes		4,784	99.19
Total rejected ballots		39	0.81
Turnout		4,823	61.53
Electors on the lists		7,838	–

1900 Quebec general election
Party	Candidate	Votes	%
Liberal	Pierre-Calixe Neault	2,438	50.89
Conservative	Alfred Trudel	2,353	49.11
Total valid votes		4,791	99.69
Total rejected ballots		15	0.31
Turnout		4,806	68.67
Electors on the lists		6,999	–

1897 Quebec general election
Party	Candidate	Votes	%
Conservative	Pierre Grenier	2,392	52.35
Liberal	Théophile Trépanier	2,117	47.65
Total valid votes		4,569	99.65
Total rejected ballots		16	0.35
Turnout		4,585	77.58
Electors on the lists		5,910	–

1892 Quebec general election
Party	Candidate	Votes	%
Conservative	Pierre Grenier	2,043	61.97
Liberal	Théophile Trudel	1,254	38.03
Total valid votes		3,297	99.01
Total rejected ballots		33	0.99
Turnout		3,330	61.34
Electors on the lists		5,429	–

1890 Quebec general election
Party	Candidate	Votes	%
Conservative	Pierre Grenier	1,969	50.62
Liberal	Ferdinand Trudel	1,921	49.38
Total valid votes		3,890	98.73
Total rejected ballots		50	1.27
Turnout		3,940	78.75
Electors on the lists		5,003	–

1886 Quebec general election
Party	Candidate	Votes	%
Parti national	Ferdinand Trudel	1,578	50.51
Conservative	D.-Tancrède Trudel	1,546	49.49
Total valid votes		3,124	98.67
Total rejected ballots		42	1.33
Turnout		3,166	76.79
Electors on the lists		4,123	–

1881 Quebec general election
Party	Candidate	Votes
Conservative	Robert Trudel	Acclaimed
Electors on the lists		3,860

1878 Quebec general election
Party	Candidate	Votes	%
Conservative	Dominique-Napoléon Saint-Cyr	1,552	61.15
Liberal	J. Massicotte	986	38.85
Total valid votes		2,538	99.37
Total rejected ballots		16	0.63
Turnout		2,554	77.84
Electors on the lists		3,281	–

1875 Quebec general election
Party	Candidate	Votes	%
Conservative	Dominique-Napoléon Saint-Cyr	859	36.26
Conservative	Joseph-V. Genest	741	31.28
Liberal	Georges-Henri Dufresne	370	15.62
Independent	Joseph G. Lanouette	261	11.02
Conservative	L.-J.-O. Brunelle	138	5.83
Total valid votes		2,369	99.00
Total rejected ballots		24	1.00
Turnout		2,393	72.94
Electors on the lists		3,281	–

1871 Quebec general election
Party	Candidate	Votes	%
Conservative	François-Xavier-Anselme Trudel	902	38.70
Liberal	Télesphore Eusèbe Normand	836	35.86
Conservative	Robert Trudel	593	25.44
Total valid votes		2,331	100.00
Turnout		2,331	72.38
Electors on the lists		2,905	–

Quebec provincial by-election, 1867
Party	Candidate	Votes
Conservative	Jean-Charles Chapais	Acclaimed

1867 Quebec general election
Party	Candidate	Votes	%
Conservative	John Jones Ross	1,168	64.04
Liberal	Télesphore Eusèbe Normand	656	35.96
Total valid votes		1,824	100.00
Turnout		1,824	72.38
Electors on the lists		2,520	–

== See also ==
- List of Quebec provincial electoral districts
- Canadian provincial electoral districts
