= Maximilien Polak =

Canadian politician (1930–2022)

Member of the National Assembly of Quebec for Sainte-Anne
- In office 1981–1989
- Preceded by: Maximilien Polak
- Succeeded by: Normand Cherry

Personal details
- Born: December 4, 1930 Leiden, Netherlands
- Died: December 27, 2022 (aged 92)
- Party: Liberal
- Education: Université de Montréal

Maximilien Polak (December 5, 1930 – December 27, 2022) was a Dutch-born Canadian judge and politician in the province of Quebec. Polak served as a Member of the National Assembly of Quebec from 1981 to 1989 and later served as a justice in the Court of Quebec.

== Early life ==
Maximilien Polak was born December 5, 1930 in Leiden, Netherlands to professor Max Valentyn Polak and Maria Cordelia Nieuwenhuizen. Polak studied at the Stedelijk Gymnasium Leiden and University of Leiden, where he received his law license in 1952. That same year, Polak immigrated to Canada. Polak enrolled in Université de Montréal, earning a degree in law in 1958 and passed the Quebec Bar.

Polak worked as a lawyer at the office of Shriar and Polak in the 1960s before serving as a municipal court judge in Côte Saint-Luc from 1969 to 1979. From 1971 to 1976, Polak served as vice-president of the Conference of Municipal Judges of Quebec. In 1974, he was named a legal councilor of the Crown and was president of the Canada-Holland Chamber of Commerce in 1977. In 1980 and 1981, Polak served as a commissioner on the Commission scolaire de Montréal, and later on the board of directors of the school board.

== Political career ==
Polak was first elected to the Quebec National Assembly in the 1981 Quebec general election as a Liberal, representing the district of Sainte-Anne. He was re-elected in 1985, and served as the deputy whip during that term. In the 1989 Quebec general election, Polak chose not to run again after he was passed up for a ministerial position.

== Post-political career ==
Polak served as a justice on the served as a judge from 1991 to 2000, at which point he retired; however, he served as an "ad hoc" judge from 2001 to 2005.

== Personal life ==
Polak married Celine Spier in 1954 and had three children. Polak's son, Michael, also a lawyer, serves as the Honorary Consul General of the Netherlands in Montreal. His daughter, Carolyn, also a lawyer, specializes in family law.

Polak died on December 27, 2022, at the age of 92.

== Electoral record (incomplete) ==
1985 Quebec general election: Sainte-Anne
| Party | Candidate | Votes | % |
|---|---|---|---|
| Liberal | Maximilien Polak | 12,565 | 60.92 |
| Parti Québécois | Guibert Biard | 6,899 | 33.45 |
| New Democratic | Kurtis Law | 633 | 3.07 |
| Parti indépendantiste | Richard Robillard | 260 | 1.26 |
| Commonwealth of Canada | Jean Vigneault | 108 | 0.52 |
| Christian Socialist | Gilles Olivier | 98 | 0.48 |
| Non-Affiliated | Albani Laporte | 62 | 0.30 |
| Total valid votes | | 20,625 | |
| Rejected and declined votes | | 495 | |
| Turnout | | 21,120 | 65.89 |
| Electors on the lists | | 32,052 | |
