= Maurice Bellemare =

Canadian politician

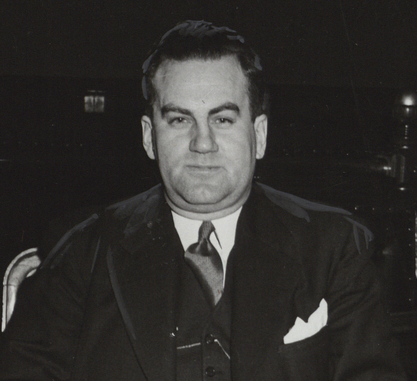

Member of the National Assembly of Quebec for Champlain
- In office 1944–1970
- Preceded by: Joseph-Philias Morin
- Succeeded by: Normand Toupin

Member of the National Assembly of Quebec for Johnson
- In office 1974–1979
- Preceded by: Jean-Claude Boutin
- Succeeded by: Camille Picard

Personal details
- Born: 8 June 1912 Grand-Mère, Quebec
- Died: 15 June 1989 (aged 77) Grand-Mère, Quebec
- Party: Union Nationale

Maurice Bellemare, OC (8 June 1912 – 15 June 1989) was a politician in Quebec, Canada. He was known as Le Vieux Lion de la Politique Québécoise (The Old Lion of Quebec Politics) because of his colourful style and his many years of public office. Bellemare was one of the last survivors of the Union Nationale party.

== Member of the legislature ==
Born in Grand-Mère, Quebec, Bellemare served seven consecutive terms as Member of the Legislative Assembly for the district of Champlain in the Mauricie area. He was a member of the Union nationale and first was elected in the 1944 provincial election at the age of 32, when Maurice Duplessis was put back in office as Premier of Quebec.

== Gaining influence ==
Bellemare served as the Deputy Government House Whip, from the 1948 provincial election to 1953, and as the Government House Whip, from 1953 to 1959.

He also was the mayor of Saint-Jean-des-Piles, a small town in the Mauricie area, from 1954 to 1957.

After the Duplessis's death in 1959, Paul Sauvé became Premier. He appointed Bellemare to the Cabinet as Minister without Portfolio. The function is honorary for the most part, but indicates that Bellemare was gaining political clout. Bellemare remained in the Cabinet until the Liberals won a majority in the 1960 election.

As a Member of the Official Opposition, Bellemare was soon considered one of the Lesage administration’s most vocal and most effective critics.

== Member of the Cabinet ==
In 1966, the Union Nationale won a majority of seats to the legislature, even though they received fewer votes than the Liberals and Daniel Johnson Sr. became Premier.

Bellemare was appointed to the Cabinet. He served as Minister of Labour from the 1966 election to 1970, Minister of Industry and Commerce from 1966 to 1967 and Government House Leader from 1966 to 1969.

He also served a second term as Mayor of Saint-Jean-des-Piles from 1968 to 1970.

Bellemare did not run for re-election in the 1970 election and temporarily retired from public office.

== Rescuing his party ==
After Johnson’s death in 1968, Jean-Jacques Bertrand became Leader of the Union Nationale. Under his tenure, the party suffered from internal divisions and lost many of its followers to the emerging Parti Québécois. From 56 seats in the 1966 election, the strength of the party at the legislature went down to 17 seats in the 1970 election. In the 1973 election, a few months after Bertrand’s death and under the leadership of Gabriel Loubier, the party was completely shut out of the legislature for the first time since its founding in 1935.

With the Union Nationale on life support, Bellemare came out of retirement and took over as interim leader until a convention could be held. Against all odds, he won a by-election in the district of Johnson in the Eastern Townships. For more than two years, Bellemare was the only sitting Union Nationale member of the legislature.

A few months before the 1976 election, Rodrigue Biron was chosen as leader and the party was able to get Bellemare and 10 other members elected to the legislature. From 1976 until he retired from provincial politics for good in 1979, Bellemare served as the House Leader of the Union Nationale.

Less than three months after Bellemare's retirement, Biron left the Union Nationale. He eventually joined the governing Parti Québécois, a move of which Bellemare strongly disapproved. Bellemare was a federalist.

Biron's defection to the PQ undermined Bellemare's efforts to rebuild the Union Nationale. In the 1981 election, the party was wiped off the map again.

In the 1985 election, the Union Nationale was running 19 candidates (out of 122) who had no reasonable chance of winning. Bellemare supported the new Progressive Conservative Party of Quebec but later announced that for the first time he would vote Liberal.

== Municipal politics ==
Against the advice of Québec Premier Maurice Duplessis, Bellemare ran for Mayor of Cap-de-la-Madeleine in 1957 against incumbent André Julien. He narrowly lost with 1,354 votes (46.8%) against his opponent's 1,539 (53.2%).

From 1981 to 1983, Bellemare was one of the Councillors of the Saint-Jean-des-Piles local government.

In 1983, he was made an Officer of the Order of Canada in recognition for being "a politician who always cared about the welfare of working people and served his province and country with enthusiasm, determination and skill".

In 1989, he died from diabetes at age 77.

== See also ==
- List of third party leaders (Quebec)
- History of Quebec

== Footnotes ==
National Assembly of Quebec
Preceded by Pierre Laporte, Liberal	Government House Leader; 1966–1969	Succeeded by Rémi Paul, Union Nationale
Preceded by Carrier Fortin, Liberal	Minister of Labour; 1966–1970	Succeeded by Jean Cournoyer, Union Nationale
Party political offices
Preceded by Gabriel Loubier	Leader of the Union Nationale (interim); 1974–1976	Succeeded by Rodrigue Biron
