= Sainte-Anne (provincial electoral district) =

Coordinates: 45.488°N 73.558°W

Quebec electoral district

Defunct provincial electoral district
- Legislature: National Assembly of Quebec
- District created: 1965
- District abolished: 1992
- First contested: 1966
- Last contested: 1989

Demographics
- Census division(s): Montreal (part)
- Census subdivision(s): Montreal (part)

Sainte-Anne (French pronunciation: [sɛ̃t an]) was a provincial electoral district in the Montreal region of Quebec, Canada.

It was created for the 1966 election from parts of Montréal–Sainte-Anne, Montréal–Saint-Henri and Montréal–Saint-Louis electoral districts. Its final election was in 1989. It disappeared in the 1994 election and its successor electoral district was Saint-Henri–Sainte-Anne.

It was named for the former ward of Sainte-Anne or St. Ann, encompassing Griffintown and the eastern part of Pointe-Saint-Charles, referring to the parish of St. Ann's Church in Griffintown.

== Members of the Legislative Assembly / National Assembly ==
| Legislature | Years | Member | Party |
|---|---|---|---|
Riding created from Montréal–Sainte-Anne, Montréal–Saint-Henri and Montréal–Saint-Louis
| 28th | 1966–1970 | Francis Hanley | Independent |
| 29th | 1970–1973 | George Springate | Liberal |
| 30th | 1973–1976 | George Springate | Liberal |
| 31st | 1976–1981 | Jean-Marc Lacoste | Parti Québécois |
| 32nd | 1981–1985 | Maximilien Polak | Liberal |
| 33rd | 1985–1989 | Maximilien Polak | Liberal |
| 34th | 1989–1994 | Normand Cherry | Liberal |
Dissolved into Saint-Henri–Sainte-Anne
