= George Springate =

Canadian politician (1938–2019)

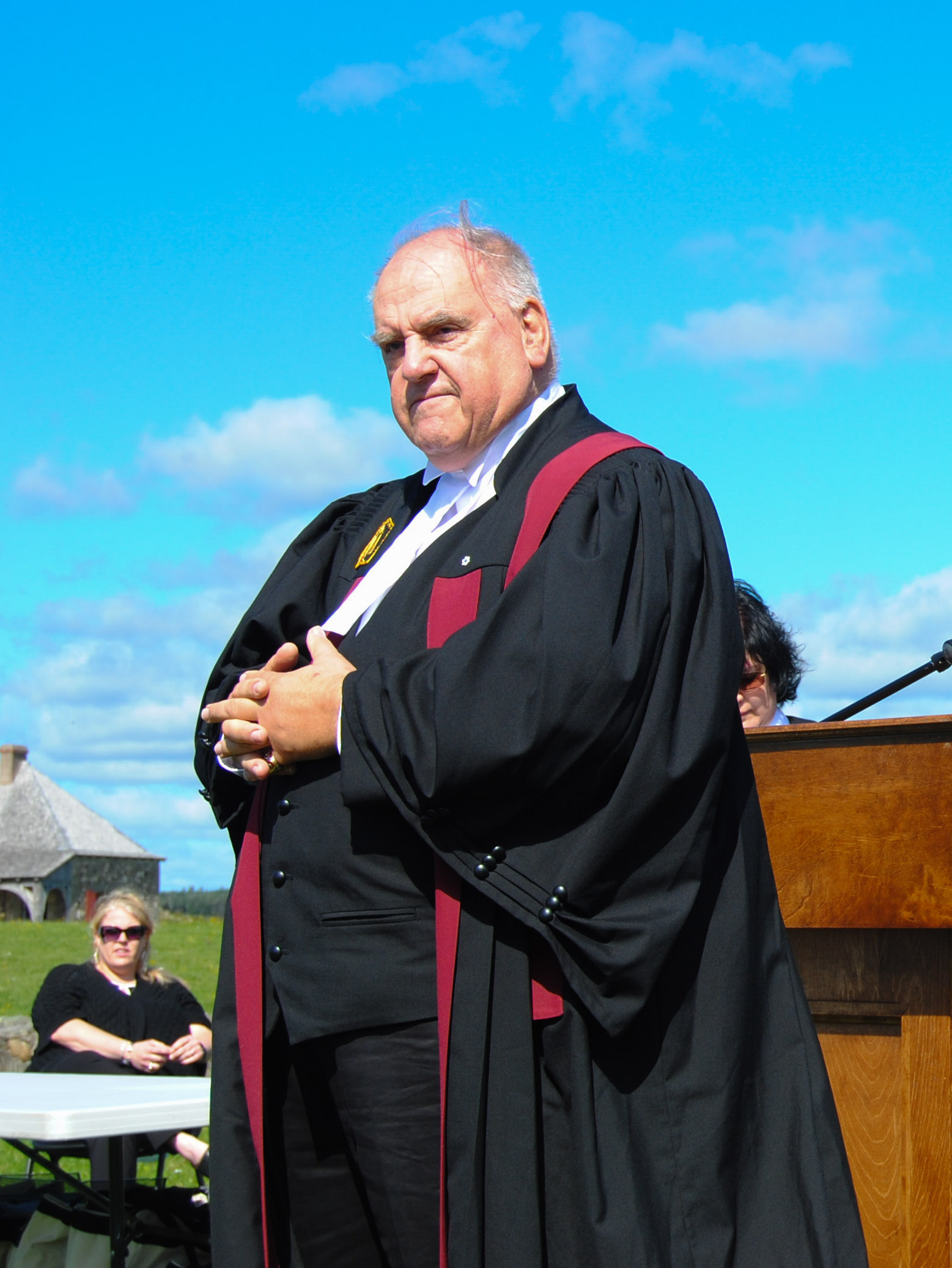

Member of the National Assembly of Quebec for Sainte-Anne
- In office 1970–1976
- Preceded by: Frank Hanley
- Succeeded by: Jean-Marc Lacoste

Member of the National Assembly of Quebec for Westmount
- In office 1976–1981
- Preceded by: Thomas Kevin Drummond
- Succeeded by: Richard French

Head of the Citizenship Commission
- In office 2008–2013
- Preceded by: Michel Simard
- Succeeded by: Renata Brum

Citizenship Judge of the Citizenship Commission
- In office 1999–2013

Personal details
- Born: May 12, 1938 Montreal, Quebec, Canada
- Died: November 20, 2019 (aged 81) Ottawa, Ontario, Canada
- Education: Sir George Williams University; McGill University
- Football career

Profile
- Position: Kicker

Personal information
- Listed height: 6 ft 1 in (1.85 m)
- Listed weight: 200 lb (91 kg)

Career information
- College: McGill

Career history
- Montreal Alouettes (1970–72)

Awards and highlights
- Grey Cup champion (1970)

George Philip Gregory Springate CM (May 12, 1938 – November 20, 2019) was a Canadian police officer, lawyer, politician, professional football player, professor, and citizenship judge.

== Life and career ==
Born in Montreal, Quebec, the son of Walter L. Springate and Eleanor Woodhouse, he received a Bachelor of Arts from Sir George Williams University. He also earned a Bachelor of Civil Law degree in 1968 and a Bachelor of Common Law degree in 1969 from McGill University. From 1958 to 1969, he was a police officer with the Montreal Police. From 1966 to 1968, he was a member of the McGill Redmen football team.

In 1970, he played 11 games with and was part of the Grey Cup winning Montreal Alouettes. In total he played 17 games with the Alouettes over three seasons.

In 1970, he was elected to the National Assembly of Quebec as a Liberal for the riding of Sainte-Anne. He was re-elected in 1973. In 1974 he was removed from the Liberal Caucus for voting against the French-only language bill along with John Ciaccia. In his third term as a Liberal, he represented the riding of Westmount. He did not run in the 1981 Quebec general election.

George Springate was also a television sportcaster for CBC Montreal in the 1980s and hosted the local daily current affairs program Midday.

In 1989, he was made a Member of the Order of Canada.

He was a teacher in criminal and civil law at John Abbott College. He was a founding member of the "Police Technology" program at John Abbott College in 1973; he retired from teaching in 2008. He was also a columnist for The Montreal Daily News and The Sunday Express, local Montreal newspapers.

In 1999 and again in 2006, he was appointed a citizenship judge. In 2008 he was appointed Canada's Senior Citizenship Judge for a five-year term. Springate was diagnosed with stage 4 colon cancer in April 2018. He died in Ottawa on November 20, 2019, at the age of 81.
