= Normand Toupin =

Canadian politician

Normand Toupin was a politician in Quebec, Canada.

== Background ==
He was born on November 21, 1933, in Saint-Maurice, Quebec, Mauricie.

== Political career ==
Toupin was elected as a Liberal candidate to the provincial legislature in the district of Champlain in 1970. He was re-elected in 1973. He was appointed to the Cabinet in 1970. He lost against Parti Québécois candidate Marcel Gagnon in 1976.

== Footnotes ==
National Assembly of Quebec
Preceded by Maurice Bellemare (Union Nationale)	MNA, District of Champlain; 1970–1976	Succeeded by Marcel Gagnon (PQ)
