= Benjamin Faucher =

Canadian politician

Member of the National Assembly of Quebec for Yamaska
- In office 1970–1973
- Preceded by: Paul Shooner
- Succeeded by: District was abolished

Member of the National Assembly of Quebec for Nicolet-Yamaska
- In office 1973–1976
- Preceded by: District was created
- Succeeded by: Serge Fontaine

Personal details
- Born: April 12, 1915 Saint-Elphège, Quebec
- Died: December 26, 1990 (aged 75) Pierreville, Quebec
- Party: Liberal

Benjamin Faucher (April 12, 1915 – December 26, 1990) was a Canadian provincial politician. He was the Liberal member of the National Assembly of Quebec for Yamaska and Nicolet-Yamaska from 1970 to 1976.
