= Normand Cherry =

Canadian politician (1938–2021)

Member of the National Assembly of Quebec for Sainte-Anne
- In office 1989–1994
- Preceded by: Maximilien Polak
- Succeeded by: District was abolished in 1994

Member of the National Assembly of Quebec for Saint-Laurent
- In office 1994–1998
- Preceded by: Robert Bourassa
- Succeeded by: Jacques Dupuis

Personal details
- Born: June 2, 1938 Montreal, Quebec
- Died: April 11, 2021 Montreal, Quebec
- Party: Liberal

Normand Cherry (June 2, 1938 – April 11, 2021) was a Canadian politician and union leader in the province of Quebec. He was a Liberal member of the National Assembly of Quebec from 1989 to 1998 and served as a cabinet minister in the governments of Robert Bourassa and Daniel Johnson.

== Early life and union career ==
Cherry was born in Montreal and received his early education in the Rosemont area of the city. He worked for Canadair from 1954 to 1989 and became a prominent labour activist, serving as president of the International Association of Machinists and Aerospace Workers (IAMAW) Local 712 from 1969 to 1989. From 1985, he also lectured at the IAMAW Training and Conference Center in Maryland.

Cherry formed a "Canadair Survival Committee" in late 1985, after the government of Canada announced that it was planning to sell the company to a private investor. Cherry's group sought to ensure that Canadair would remain publicly owned, stay in Montreal, and protect the jobs of its employees. Cherry nonetheless supported Bombardier's successful offer to purchase the company in 1986, saying that the terms of the deal were favourable.

In September 1986, Cherry argued that a federal contract to maintain CF-18 fighter jets should be given to Canadair rather than to a competing bid led by foreign-owned firms in Manitoba and Ontario. He said that it was not his intent to promote Quebec's interests at the expense of other provinces and that his primary concern was to ensure the CF-18 technology would remain under Canadian control. The government of Brian Mulroney ultimately awarded the contract to Canadair.

== Political career ==
Cherry served as chief organizer for the opposition Union Nationale in the 1973 provincial election. The party fared poorly in the election, losing all of its seats in the legislature.

=== Legislator ===
Minister of cultural communities

Cherry ran as a star candidate for the Liberal Party in the 1989 provincial election and was narrowly elected in the Montreal division of Sainte-Anne. He was appointed to the Bourassa ministry on October 11, 1989, serving as the junior minister responsible for cultural communities.

In early 1990, Cherry took part in plans to modernize the manufacturing firm Valmet-Dominion Inc. (a unit of the Finnish company Valmet) and relaunch its corporate office in Montreal. He spoke at the opening ceremonies and announced that Quebec would provide $11.1 million in development assistance. Less than a month later, Valmet-Dominion issued layoff notices to one third of its workforce; company officials said that the layoffs were cyclical, resulting from a downturn in the sector, though others expressed concern about the timing of the announcement.

Labour minister

Cherry was promoted to minister of labour on October 5, 1990, while retaining ministerial responsibility for cultural communities. In late 1991, he took part in a ceremony that launched the Canadair CL-415 and announced that Quebec would purchase eight of the new amphibious aircraft. In the same time period, Cherry appointed a business-labor advisory panel to suggest amendments to Quebec's 1981 law on workers' compensation that some critics believed was overly generous.

In 1993, Cherry took part in negotiations with officials from Ontario and New Brunswick in an effort to resolve long-standing differences in the construction sector. In October 1993, he announced that Quebec would continue to require that out-of-province workers earn a "certificate of competence" before being allowed to work on Quebec sites. The following month, however, he introduced legislation to deregulate homebuilding sites and permit the use of non-union labour. Construction workers organized several protests and strikes in a bid to defeat the legislation; the government responded with harsh back-to-work legislation, which Cherry himself described as "probably the most severe legislation ever introduced" on the matter. Despite the protests, the legislation was approved by the assembly and brought into law. Cherry was expelled from his IAWAW local at around the same time.

Transport minister

Robert Bourassa announced his resignation as Liberal Party leader and premier in late 1993, and Cherry supported Daniel Johnson's bid to become the party's new leader. When Johnson became premier on January 11, 1994, he appointed Cherry as transport minister. In this position, Cherry initiated fifty million dollars' worth of road repairs and introduced a camera system to review congestion on Montreal roads. He also sought to co-ordinate better links between Quebec's road, rail, and ship transportation lines. In September 1994, he launched a thirty-six million dollar project to link Saint-Bruno-de-Montarville with the Jacques Cartier Bridge.

Opposition member

Cherry's Sainte-Anne division was eliminated by redistribution before the 1994 provincial election, and he was re-elected in Saint-Laurent, a safe Liberal seat in Montreal. The Parti Québécois defeated the Liberals in this election, and Cherry resigned from cabinet with the rest of the Johnson ministry on September 26, 1994. He served as a member of the official opposition for the next four years and was his party's critic for transport issues.

An ardent Canadian federalist, Cherry spoke against Quebec separatism in the 1994 election and campaigned for the "non" side in the 1995 Quebec referendum on sovereignty.

When Daniel Johnson resigned as Liberal Party leader in 1998, Cherry was among the first Liberals to suggest that Jean Charest become his successor. Charest was subsequently chosen as party leader.

Cherry was not a candidate in the 1998 election.

== Electoral record ==
1994 Quebec general election: Saint-Laurent
| Party | Candidate | Votes | % | ±% |
|---|---|---|---|---|
| Liberal | Normand Cherry | 25,711 | 76.73 | +24.60 |
| Parti Québécois | Louis Thibaudeau | 5,602 | 16.72 | −1.98 |
| Action démocratique | Daniel Murray | 1,061 | 3.17 | – |
| Equality | Ray Moscato | 362 | 1.08 | −22.81 |
| CANADA! | Tony Kondaks | 243 | 0.73 | – |
| Natural Law | Marc Hindle | 154 | 0.46 | – |
| Economic | François Blouin | 147 | 0.44 | – |
| Communist | Robert Bob Aubin | 94 | 0.28 | −0.25 |
| Non-affiliated | Annette Kouri | 72 | 0.21 | – |
| Republic of Canada | Seng Phlang | 61 | 0.18 | – |
| Total valid votes | | 33,507 | 98.60 | – |
| Total rejected ballots | | 476 | 1.40 | – |
| Turnout | | 33,983 | 81.83 | +7.71 |
| Electors on the lists | | 41,530 | – | – |

1989 Quebec general election: Sainte-Anne
| Party | Candidate | Votes | % |
|---|---|---|---|
| Liberal | Normand Cherry | 9,089 | 41.18 |
| Parti Québécois | Gilles Cormier | 7,977 | 36.14 |
| Equality | Richard Lord | 3,057 | 13.85 |
| Green | Serge Bellemare | 941 | 4.26 |
| New Democratic | Suzy Potvin | 218 | 0.99 |
| Independent | André 1er Le Pape Brabant | 177 | 0.80 |
| Independent | Fergus V. Keyes | 170 | 0.77 |
| Progressive Conservative | Réal Letendre | 141 | 0.64 |
| Parti des travailleurs | Daniel McCrea | 78 | 0.35 |
| Marxist–Leninist | Diane Johnston | 70 | 0.32 |
| Social Credit | Jimmy Alcide Gallant | 68 | 0.31 |
| Communist | Irène Dasylva | 44 | 0.20 |
| Socialist Movement | Thérèse Spénard | 42 | 0.19 |
| Total valid votes | | 22,072 | 100.00 |
| Rejected and declined votes | | 559 | |
| Turnout | | 22,631 | 67.31 |
| Electors on the lists | | 33,623 | |
