= Kevin Drummond =

Canadian politician (1930–2021)

T. Kevin Drummond

Member of the National Assembly of Quebec for Westmount
- In office 1970–1976
- Succeeded by: George Springate

Personal details
- Born: June 5, 1930 Montreal, Quebec, Canada
- Died: December 11, 2021 (aged 91) Montreal, Quebec, Canada
- Party: Liberal
- Spouse: Mary MacDermot (m. 1957; died 2015)
- Children: 3

Thomas Kevin Drummond (June 5, 1930 – December 11, 2021) was a Canadian politician in the province of Quebec. He served in the National Assembly of Quebec from 1970 to 1976, during which time he also served as Minister of Lands and Forests from 1970 to 1975 and as Minister of Agriculture from 1975 to 1976 in the cabinet of premier Robert Bourassa.

Born in Montreal, Drummond attended McGill University, Harvard University, and the University of Paris, and he earned degrees in commerce, economics, and political science. He later was involved in agriculture in the Huntingdon, Quebec area. He married Mary MacDermot of Montreal in 1957; she died in 2015. Drummond died on December 11, 2021, aged 91.
