= Le Mouvement socialiste =

The Le Mouvement socialiste (French pronunciation: [lə muvmɑ̃ sɔsjalist], lit. 'The Socialist Movement') was a revolutionary syndicalist journal in France founded in 1899 by Hubert Lagardelle and dissolved in 1914. Other key founders included Karl Marx's grandson Jean Longuet and Émile Durkheim's nephew Marcel Mauss. It advocated segregation of social classes; opposed bourgeois life, democracy, universal suffrage, and parliamentarism; and supported a society led by "conscious, rebellious" men that would develop a disciplined bold new man as part of a "worker's army". The journal was popular and attracted an international audience in its examination of Marxism and revolutionary syndicalism, with well-known revolutionary syndicalists contributing to it, such as Georges Sorel and Victor Griffuelhes.
