= Étapisme =

Étapisme (French for gradualism) is the term for a strategy for independence dominant in the Parti Québécois since 1974. It is associated with the figure of Claude Morin, who convinced Parti Québécois leader René Lévesque and eventually a majority of party delegates to adopt its principles. Proponents of the strategy are called étapistes.

It advocates a step-by-step approach to achieving independence. Before 1974, the Parti Québécois programme stipulated that independence would be declared upon electing a majority of Parti Québécois Members of the National Assembly of Quebec (MNAs), under Quebec's first-past-the-post electoral system and its British parliamentary system. Under étapisme, the Parti Québécois would promise a good government first and propose a referendum on independence second.

At the first referendum of 1980, étapisme was also implemented in the referendum process, since the question asked for a mandate to negotiate sovereignty-association with Canada with the commitment to hold a second referendum to ratify the resulting agreement.

From time to time, this approach has been challenged by hardliners. Two of the most famous challenges to étapisme were at the 1981 National Congress, colloquially known as the Renérendum (because René Lévesque put his leadership in question in an internal vote on the question), and with the so-called Parizeau-Laplante Proposition of the 2000s. Jacques Parizeau was opposed to this strategy and ratification in a second referendum would not be proposed again in the referendum of 1995.

== See also ==
- Pur et dur - opposing tendency in the Quebec sovereignty movement
- SNP gradualism (similar strategy in the Scottish National Party)
- Gradualism
- Incrementalism
- Quebec sovereignty movement
- Realos, gradualist tendency in Green politics
- Reformist socialism and Possibilism, gradualist tendencies in the socialist movement
- Libertarian possibilism, current in the Spanish anarchist movement supporting participation in parliamentary politics
