= Louis-Hébert =

Louis-Hébert may refer to the following electoral districts in Canada:

- Louis-Hébert (provincial electoral district)
- Louis-Hébert (federal electoral district)
