= Sam Hamad =

Canadian politician

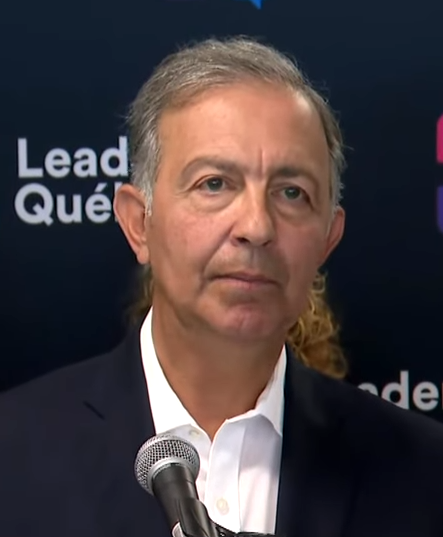
- Hamad in 2025

Member of the National Assembly of Quebec for Louis-Hébert
- In office May 1, 2003 – April 27, 2017
- Preceded by: Paul Bégin
- Succeeded by: Geneviève Guilbault

Quebec Minister of Labour, Employment and Social Solidarity
- In office February 27, 2015 – January 28, 2016
- Premier: Philippe Couillard
- Preceded by: Position established
- Succeeded by: François Blais

Quebec Minister of Labour
- In office April 23, 2014 – February 27, 2015
- Premier: Philippe Couillard
- Preceded by: Agnès Maltais
- Succeeded by: Position abolished
- In office September 9, 2009 – August 10, 2010
- Premier: Jean Charest
- Preceded by: David Whissell
- Succeeded by: Lise Thériault

Quebec Minister of Economic Development, Innovation and Export Trade
- In office September 7, 2011 – September 19, 2012
- Premier: Jean Charest
- Preceded by: Clément Gignac
- Succeeded by: Nicolas Marceau

Quebec Minister of Transport
- In office August 11, 2010 – September 6, 2011
- Premier: Jean Charest
- Preceded by: Julie Boulet
- Succeeded by: Pierre Moreau

Quebec Minister of Employment and Social Solidarity
- In office April 18, 2007 – August 10, 2010
- Premier: Jean Charest
- Preceded by: Michelle Courchesne
- Succeeded by: Julie Boulet

Quebec Minister of Natural Resources
- In office April 29, 2003 – February 18, 2005
- Premier: Jean Charest
- Preceded by: François Gendron
- Succeeded by: Pierre Corbeil

Personal details
- Born: Sammy Hamed-Allah; June 17, 1958 (age 67) Damascus, Syria
- Party: Quebec Liberal Party
- Cabinet: Chair of the Conseil du trésor

Sam Hamad (born June 17, 1958) is a Canadian politician. He is the former member of National Assembly (MNA) for the riding of Louis-Hebert in the Quebec City region. A member of the Quebec Liberal Party, he has held various cabinet posts during his 14 years in the National Assembly. He was the Minister of Natural Resources, Minister for Transports and he was also the Minister of Employment and Social Solidarity, Minister of Labour and Minister responsible for the Capitale-Nationale region.

== Biography ==
=== Early years and education ===
Born in Damascus, Syria, Hamad moved to Quebec City and studied civil engineering at Université Laval where he received both a bachelor's and master's degree. He also studied at the Université du Québec à Trois-Rivières where he obtained a master's degree in management. His birth name was Samer Hamed-Allah but he changed it when he moved to Quebec, saying that Samer sounded too much like the French words "sa mère" (meaning "his mother").

=== Career ===
He was an administration member for the Ordre des Ingénieurs du Québec for nine years, while he was also a lecturer at Université Laval and the Université du Québec à Rimouski and the President of the Quebec Board of Trade and Industry.

He was also involved in the community, being the vice-president of Centraide-Quebec a board member of the Laval Hospital Foundation. He was also part of several associations promoting development in the region including the GATIQ which promoted advance technologies and innovations for the region.

Before making his foray into politics, Hamad was vice-president of Groupe Roche, an influential engineering firm, from 1998 to 2003.

=== Politics ===
Hamed entered politics in 2003, where he became the MNA for Louis-Hebert as the Liberals led by Jean Charest defeated the Parti Québécois. He would be named Minister of Wildlife, Natural Resources and Parks and the Minister responsible for the Capitale-Nationale (Quebec) region. He was removed from Cabinet in 2005 after he was criticized in regard to a project which would have added a new thermo plant in the Suroit region.

Hamad was narrowly re-elected in 2007. Initially, it was thought that the Action démocratique du Québec won the seat but late ballots pushed Hamad to a late-victory and no recounts were made. As he was only one of two Liberal MNAs elected in the Quebec City region (the other being Philippe Couillard), Hamad was named the Minister of Employment and Social Solidarity until where he was named Minister of Transports, swapping portfolios with Julie Boulet. Briefly in 2010, he also held the Labour portfolio after David Whissell resigned his position following conflict of interest allegations.

He returned to the Labour portfolio on April 23, 2014.

He announced his resignation as an MNA on April 27, 2017.

In 2025, he was a candidate for mayor of Quebec city, but finished third.

Political offices
Preceded by François Gendron	Minister of Natural Resources; 2003–2005	Succeeded by Pierre Corbeil
Preceded by Michelle Courchesne	Minister of Employment and Social Solidarity; 2007–2010	Succeeded by Julie Boulet
Preceded by David Whissell	Minister of Labour; 2009–2010	Succeeded by Lise Theriault
Preceded by Julie Boulet	Minister of Transports; 2010–2011	Succeeded by Pierre Moreau
Preceded by Clément Gignac	Minister of Economic Development, Innovation and Export Trade; 2011–2012	Succeeded by Nicolas Marceau
Preceded by Agnès Maltais	Minister of Labour; 2014–2015	Succeeded by Position abolished
Preceded by Position established	Minister of Labour, Employment and Social Solidarity; 2015–2016	Succeeded by François Blais
