= Quebec independence referendum =

Quebec independence referendum might refer to:

- 1980 Quebec referendum
- 1995 Quebec referendum
