= 1998 German federal election =

- 27 September 1998

All 669 seats in the Bundestag 335 seats needed for a majority
- Registered: 60,762,751 (▲0.5%)
- Turnout: 82.2% (▲3.2 pp)
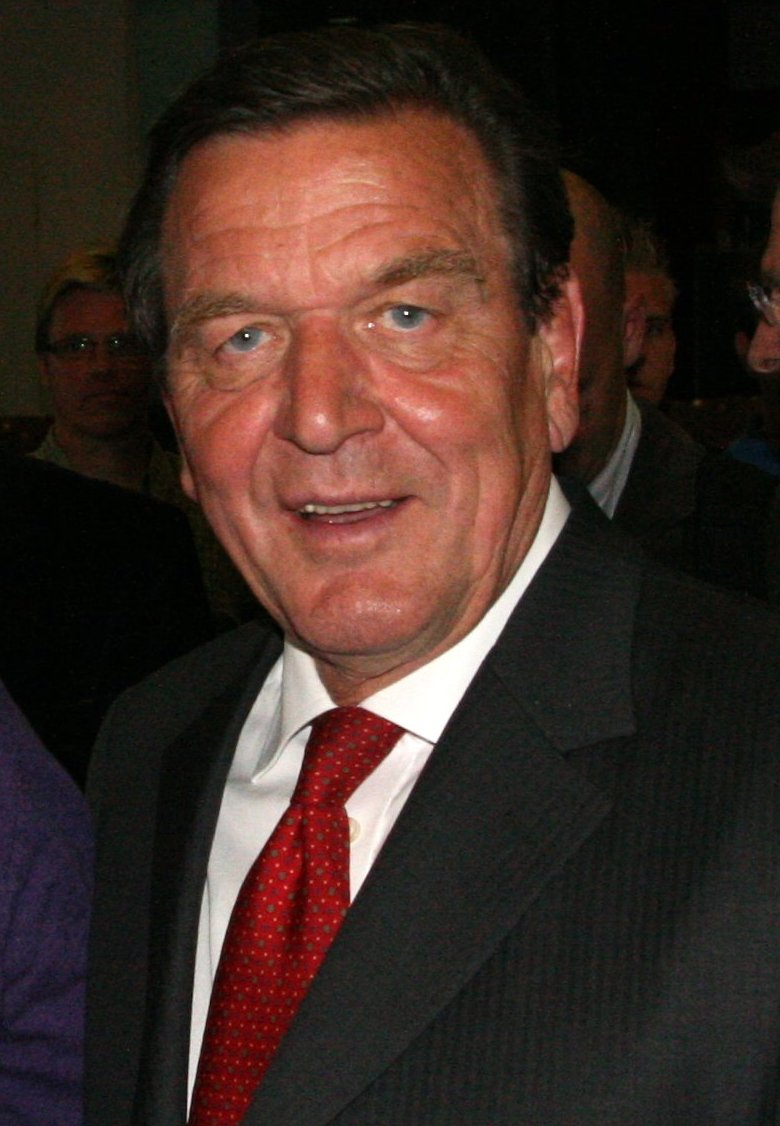

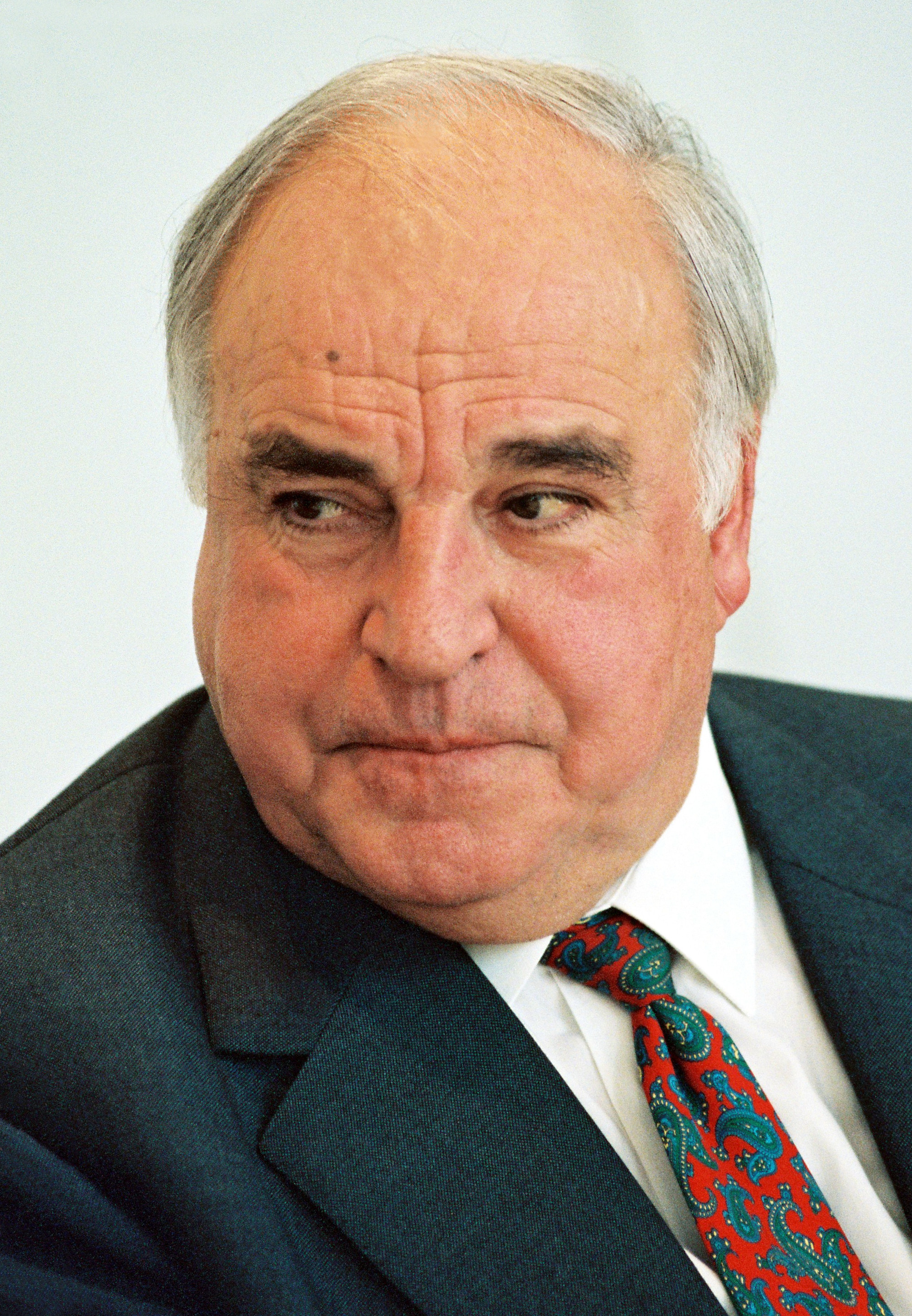

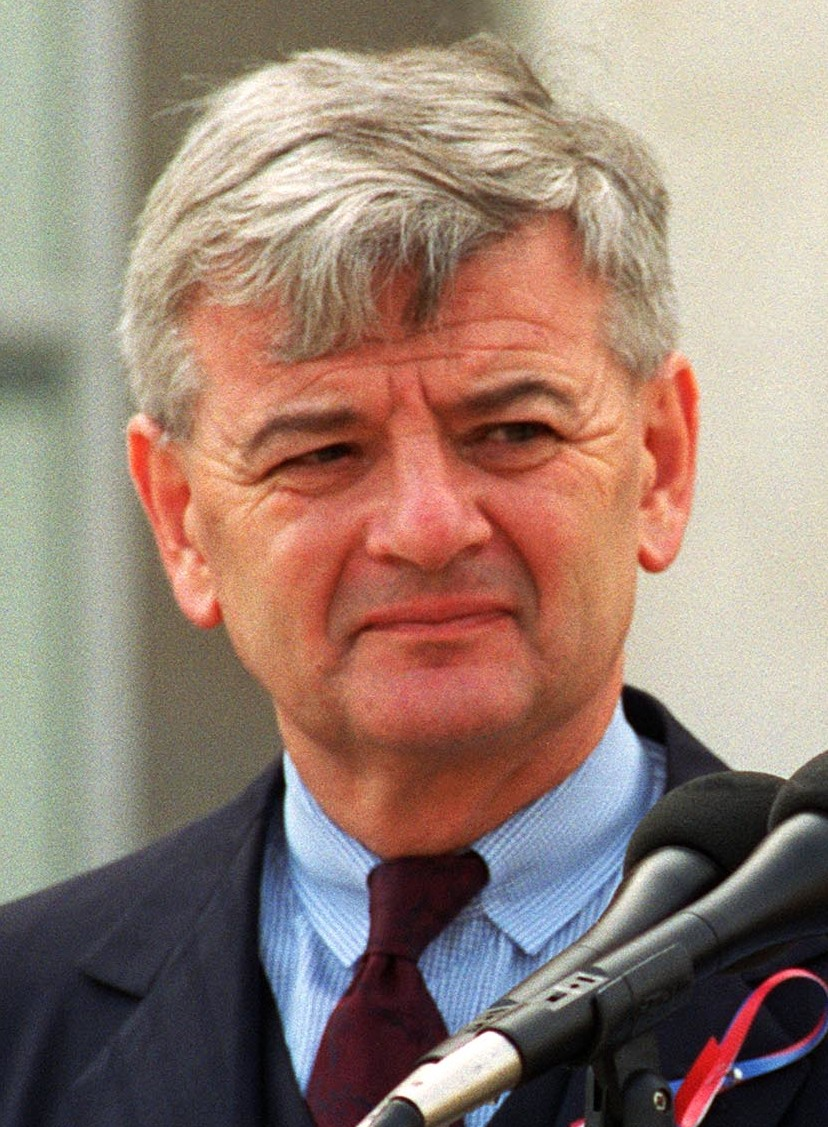

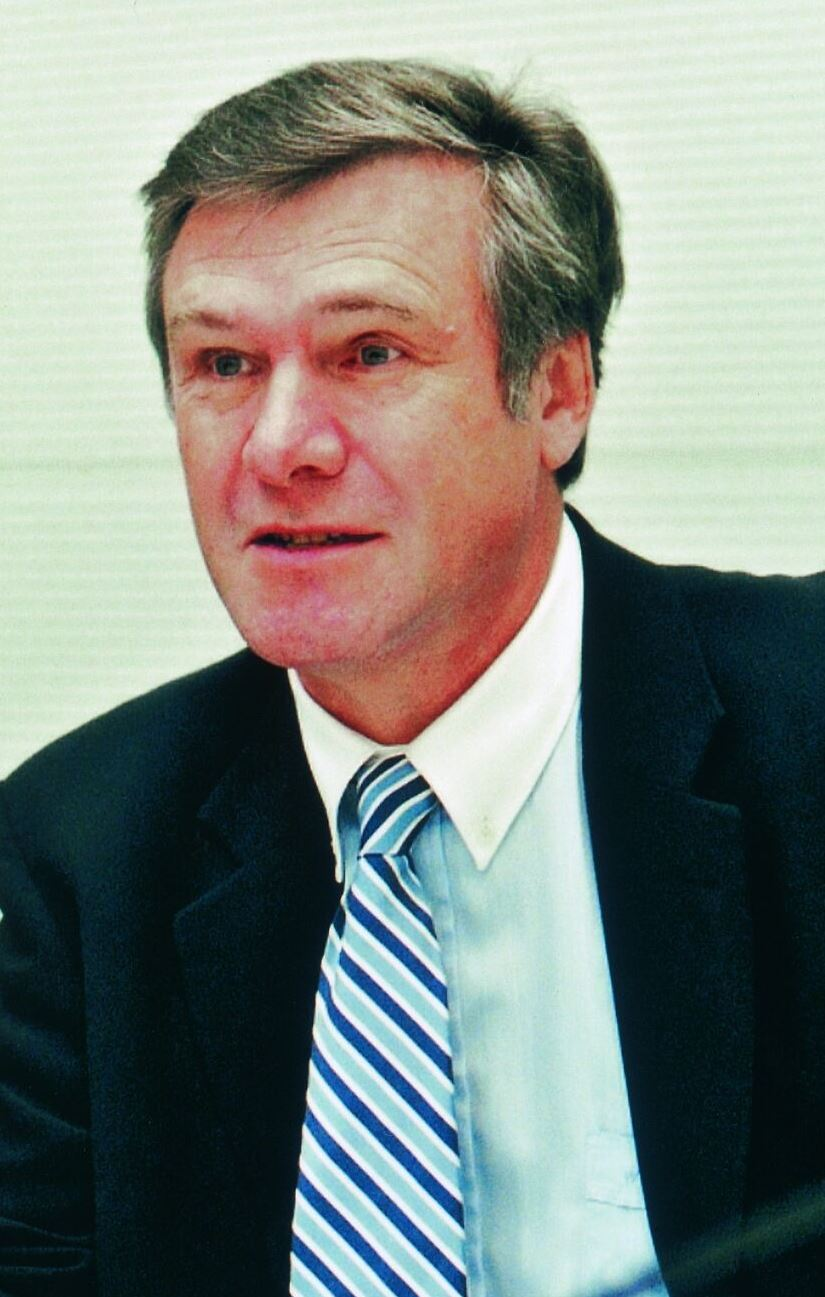

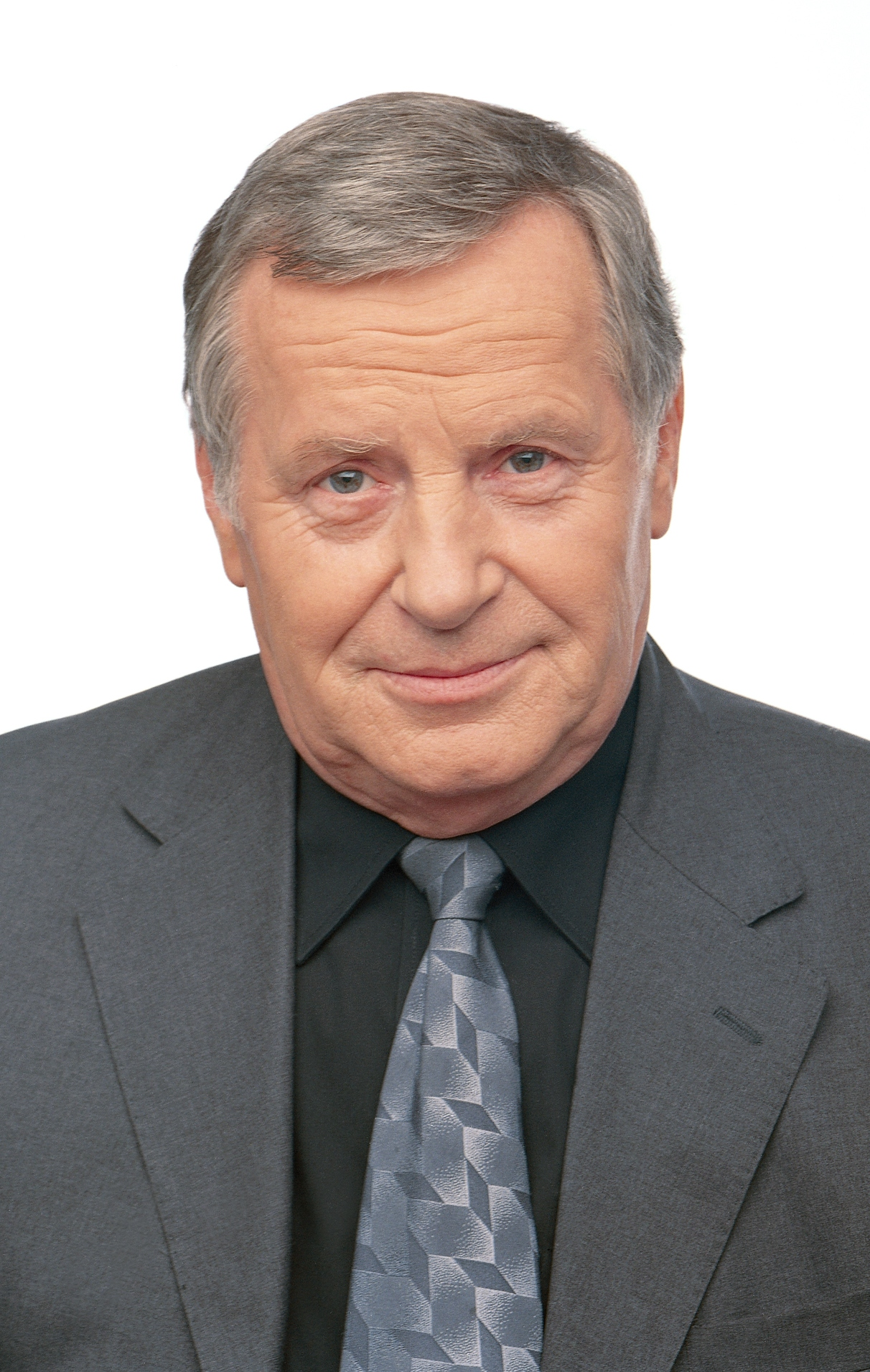
	First party	Second party	Third party
Candidate	Gerhard Schröder	Helmut Kohl	Joschka Fischer
Party	SPD	CDU/CSU	Greens
Last election	36.4%, 252 seats	41.4%, 294 seats	7.3%, 49 seats
Seats won	298	245	47
Seat change	▲46	▼49	▼2
Popular vote	20,181,269	17,329,388	3,301,624
Percentage	40.9%	35.1%	6.7%
Swing	▲4.5 pp	▼6.3 pp	▼0.6 pp
	Fourth party	Fifth party
Candidate	Wolfgang Gerhardt	Lothar Bisky
Party	FDP	PDS
Last election	6.9%, 47 seats	4.4%, 30 seats
Seats won	43	36
Seat change	▼4	▲6
Popular vote	3,080,955	2,515,454
Percentage	6.2%	5.1%
Swing	▼0.7 pp	▲0.7 pp
- Results of the election. The main map shows constituency winners, and results for the proportional list seats are shown in the bottom left.
Government before election
Fifth Kohl cabinet
CDU/CSU-FDP
Government after election
First Schröder cabinet
SPD–Green

A federal election was held in Germany on 27 September 1998 to elect the members of the 14th Bundestag. The Social Democratic Party (SPD) emerged as the largest faction in parliament for the first time since 1972, with its leader Gerhard Schröder becoming chancellor. The Christian Democrats had their worst election result since 1949.

== Issues and campaign ==
The unemployment rate in Germany had consistently risen prior since Reunification, with the unemployment rate in 1998 being 11.1%. Most people blamed the centre-right coalition government of the Christian Democratic Union/Christian Social Union (CDU/CSU) and the Free Democratic Party (FDP) for the economic difficulties. Longtime Chancellor Helmut Kohl's government was regarded by many as not having fully implemented the unification after eight years, in view of the mass protests in many eastern German towns due to job losses and social welfare cuts.

The 1998 campaign began with both the CDU and SPD working out who would lead their parties. There had been rumours that Kohl would resign and allow Wolfgang Schäuble to take the reins of the CDU, but these rumours were rendered obsolete when Kohl announced in April 1997 that he would seek the chancellorship for a sixth term. The two contenders for the SPD nomination were Oskar Lafontaine, the party's chairman, and Gerhard Schröder, Minister-President of Lower Saxony.

On 1 March 1998, Schröder led the SPD to a huge victory in the Lower Saxony state election, gaining an unusual absolute majority for the second time and effectively receiving the SPD nomination for federal chancellor. Schröder had announced he would withdraw his bid for the nomination if he received below 42 percent of the popular vote. In the 1998 general elections, Schröder received 47.9 percent. Following this election, Lafontaine withdrew his bid and Schröder was inaugurated in the May 1998 convention. For the SPD, Schröder offered a new face for the party. He gave the party a new vigor, one that was lacking in the CDU after Kohl proclaimed his nomination. Many in the CDU questioned if Kohl had made the right choice for the party.

The CDU campaign was based on the experience and reputation of Kohl. One of the CDU's main slogans was 'Safety, not Risks.' "Kohl exploited his familiarity and experience, as well as his status as Europe's longest serving head of government." The SPD on the other hand ran the campaign using strategies developed in the United States and the United Kingdom. The SPD set up election headquarters and introduced 'rapid rebuttal units' not unlike those used by Bill Clinton of the United States in his successful presidential bid in 1992. The SPD avoided direct attacks at Kohl, but rather focused on their message of a "new center".

The FDP had usually ridden on the coattails of the CDU, and was mostly disapproved in the polls. With the SPD well ahead in the polls, many of the voters from the CDU had fewer incentives to vote for the FDP. The FDP was also having trouble projecting a coherent platform to voters. The Greens too were having issues concerning their platform.

The two factions in the Greens, the fundamentalists and the pragmatists, had problems settling on their platform since the founding of the Green party.

The major issue of the 1998 campaign was unemployment. In 1996, the unemployment rate in Germany surpassed the government's "limit" of 4 million unemployed people. Both parties blamed high labor costs, high taxes and the high welfare costs as the causes of the problem. During the campaign, Schröder used this issue against Kohl, calling him 'the unemployment chancellor.' Unemployment was worst in the former East Germany. While the national rate stood at 9.4 percent, former East Germany was suffering with unemployment at 20 percent. Many in the former East Germany blamed Kohl for the slow economic recovery.

Another issue at hand were Germany's tax and welfare reforms. While the CDU/CSU had offered proposals to reduce benefits in healthcare and pensions, the SPD controlled Bundesrat secured the passage of the bill. The proposed bill also offered tax cuts that were to benefit the rich, something the SPD opposed. While Kohl continually pushed the issue of European integration, the issue fell short from voters' minds. Schröder, on the other hand, almost ignored the issue. Many voters in Germany had other concerns besides the European Union.

== Opinion polls ==
Polling for the 1998 German federal election

Polling firm	Fieldwork date	Sample size	Union	SPD	Grüne	FDP	PDS	REP	DVU	Others	Lead
1998 federal election	27 Sep 1998	–	35.1	40.9	6.7	6.2	5.1	1.8	1.2	3.0	5.8
Allensbach	26 Sep 1998	–	36.0	40.5	6.0	6.5	5.0	–	–	6.0	4.5
Infratest dimap	26 Sep 1998	–	38	40	7	6	5	4		1	2
Emnid	25 Sep 1998	–	39	40	7	5	4	–		5	1
Forsa	25 Sep 1998	–	38	42	6	5	4	–		5	4
Forsa	24 Sep 1998	–	38	42	6	5	4	–		5	4
Forsa	23 Sep 1998	–	37	42	6	6	4	–		5	5
Allensbach	23 Sep 1998	–	36.1	41.1	7.0	6.5	4.7	–	–	4.6	5.0
Forsa	22 Sep 1998	–	38	41	7	5	4	–		5	3
Forsa	21 Sep 1998	–	38	41	7	5	4	–		5	3
Forsa	20 Sep 1998	–	38	42	6	5	4	–		5	4
Forsa	19 Sep 1998	–	38	42	6	5	4	–		5	4
Infratest dimap	19 Sep 1998	–	38	41	7	6	5	4		1	3
Emnid	18 Sep 1998	–	39	41	6	5	5	3		1	2
Forsa	18 Sep 1998	–	38	42	6	5	4	–		5	4
Forschungsgruppe Wahlen	18 Sep 1998	–	37.5	39.5	6.0	5.5	4.5	–	–	7.0	2.0
Forsa	17 Sep 1998	–	38	42	7	4	4	–		5	4
Forsa	16 Sep 1998	–	38	42	7	4	4	–		5	4
Allensbach	16 Sep 1998	–	35.5	41.4	7.0	6.6	5.0	–	–	4.5	5.9
Forsa	15 Sep 1998	–	38	41	7	5	4	–		5	3
Forsa	14 Sep 1998	–	36	42	6	5	5	–		6	6
Forsa	13 Sep 1998	–	36	42	6	5	5	–		6	6
Forsa	12 Sep 1998	–	36	42	6	5	5	–		6	6
Infratest dimap	12 Sep 1998	–	37	42	7	5	4	4		1	5
Emnid	11 Sep 1998	–	38	41	6	5	5	–		5	3
Forsa	11 Sep 1998	–	37	43	6	4	4	–		6	6
Forschungsgruppe Wahlen	11 Sep 1998	–	37	41	6	6	4	–	–	6	4
Forsa	10 Sep 1998	–	37	42	6	4	5	–		6	5
Forsa	9 Sep 1998	–	37	43	6	4	4	–		6	6
Allensbach	9 Sep 1998	–	35.6	40.8	7.5	7.2	4.5	2.1	–	2.3	5.2
Forsa	8 Sep 1998	–	37	43	7	4	4	–		5	6
Forsa	7 Sep 1998	–	37	43	6	5	4	–		5	6
Forsa	6 Sep 1998	–	37	42	6	5	4	–		6	5
Forsa	5 Sep 1998	–	37	42	6	5	4	–		6	5
Infratest dimap	5 Sep 1998	–	37	43	7	5	4	3		1	6
Emnid	4 Sep 1998	–	37	42	6	5	5	4		1	5
Forsa	4 Sep 1998	–	37	42	7	5	4	–		5	5
Forschungsgruppe Wahlen	4 Sep 1998	–	38	41	6	5	4	–	–	6	3
Forsa	3 Sep 1998	–	37	42	6	5	4	–		6	5
Forsa	2 Sep 1998	–	37	42	6	5	4	–		6	5
Allensbach	2 Sep 1998	–	35.5	41.1	7.0	6.1	4.9	2.4	–	3.0	5.6
Forsa	1 Sep 1998	–	37	42	5	5	5	–		6	5
Forsa	31 Aug 1998	–	38	42	6	4	5	–		5	4
Forsa	30 Aug 1998	–	38	42	6	4	5	–		5	4
Infratest dimap	29 Aug 1998	–	38	43	6	5	4	3		1	5
Emnid	28 Aug 1998	–	38	41	6	5	4	4		2	3
Forsa	28 Aug 1998	–	38	42	6	4	5	–		5	4
Forsa	27 Aug 1998	–	37	42	6	4	5	–		6	5
Allensbach	26 Aug 1998	–	35.2	42.7	6.3	6.0	5.3	1.2	–	3.3	7.5
Infratest dimap	22 Aug 1998	–	38	43	6	5	4	3		1	5
Emnid	21 Aug 1998	–	39	42	6	5	4	3		1	3
Forsa	20 Aug 1998	–	38	43	6	4	4	4		1	5
Allensbach	19 Aug 1998	–	34.5	42.9	7.0	5.8	5.2	2.0	–	2.6	8.4
Infratest dimap	15 Aug 1998	–	37	42	7	5	5	3		1	5
Emnid	14 Aug 1998	–	38	41	6	5	4	3		3	3
Forschungsgruppe Wahlen	14 Aug 1998	–	38	42	6	5	4	–	–	5	4
Forsa	13 Aug 1998	–	37	43	6	4	4	4		2	6
Allensbach	12 Aug 1998	–	33.0	43.8	7.0	6.6	5.2	1.6	–	2.8	10.8
Infratest dimap	8 Aug 1998	–	37	42	7	6	4	3		1	5
Emnid	7 Aug 1998	–	38	41	6	6	4	4		2	3
Forsa	6 Aug 1998	–	37	43	6	4	4	4		2	6
Infratest dimap	1 Aug 1998	–	36	43	7	5	4	3		2	7
Emnid	31 Jul 1998	–	37	41	7	5	4	4		2	4
Forsa	30 Jul 1998	–	36	43	6	5	4	4		2	7
Infratest dimap	25 Jul 1998	–	37	43	7	5	4	3		1	6
Emnid	24 Jul 1998	–	37	42	6	5	4	4		2	5
Forsa	23 Jul 1998	–	36	43	6	5	5	3		2	7
Infratest dimap	18 Jul 1998	–	37	43	7	5	4	3		1	6
Emnid	17 Jul 1998	–	37	42	5	5	4	4		3	5
Forschungsgruppe Wahlen	17 Jul 1998	–	37	42	7	5	4	–	–	5	5
Forsa	16 Jul 1998	–	36	43	6	5	4	4		2	7
Infratest dimap	11 Jul 1998	–	36	44	6	5	4	3		2	8
Emnid	10 Jul 1998	–	37	42	5	6	4	4		2	5
Forsa	9 Jul 1998	–	34	43	6	5	6	3		3	9
Infratest dimap	4 Jul 1998	–	35	44	7	5	4	3		2	9
Emnid	3 Jul 1998	–	37	42	6	6	5	2		2	5
Forsa	2 Jul 1998	–	35	43	5	5	6	3		3	8
Infratest dimap	27 Jun 1998	–	36	44	7	5	5	2		1	8
Emnid	26 Jun 1998	–	37	42	6	6	5	2		2	5
Forsa	25 Jun 1998	–	36	43	6	4	6	3		2	7
Infratest dimap	20 Jun 1998	–	36	43	7	5	5	3		1	7
Emnid	19 Jun 1998	–	37	42	6	6	4	3		2	5
Forschungsgruppe Wahlen	19 Jun 1998	–	36	42	8	5	4	–	–	5	6
Forsa	18 Jun 1998	–	36	43	7	4	5	3		2	7
Allensbach	17 Jun 1998	–	31.1	44.4	7.6	6.9	5.7	2.3	–	2.0	13.3
Infratest dimap	13 Jun 1998	–	36	44	7	5	4	3		1	8
Emnid	12 Jun 1998	–	36	41	6	6	5	3		3	5
Forsa	11 Jun 1998	–	36	43	6	4	6	3		2	7
Infratest dimap	6 Jun 1998	–	35	44	7	5	4	4		1	9
Emnid	5 Jun 1998	–	37	43	4	6	4	3		3	6
Forsa	4 Jun 1998	–	36	43	6	4	6	3		2	7
Infratest dimap	30 May 1998	–	36	44	6	5	4	3		2	8
Emnid	29 May 1998	–	37	44	5	5	5	3		1	7
Forsa	27 May 1998	–	35	43	6	4	6	4		2	8
Infratest dimap	23 May 1998	–	37	43	6	4	5	3		2	6
Emnid	22 May 1998	–	37	43	6	5	4	2		3	6
Forsa	20 May 1998	–	33	45	5	5	6	4		2	12
Allensbach	20 May 1998	–	31.0	45.5	7.5	5.7	5.9	1.5	–	2.9	14.5
Infratest dimap	16 May 1998	–	35	44	6	5	5	4		1	9
Emnid	15 May 1998	–	35	43	6	6	5	3		2	8
Forschungsgruppe Wahlen	15 May 1998	–	35	43	8	5	5	–	–	4	8
Forsa	13 May 1998	–	33	46	5	5	5	–		6	13
Infratest dimap	9 May 1998	–	34	44	6	6	5	4		1	10
Emnid	8 May 1998	–	35	43	6	6	5	–		5	8
Forsa	6 May 1998	–	32	46	6	6	5	–		5	14
Infratest dimap	2 May 1998	–	35	45	6	5	4	4		1	10
Emnid	1 May 1998	–	35	44	6	6	4	–		5	9
Allensbach	29 Apr 1998	–	31.3	45.2	8.5	5.8	5.2	2.8	–	1.2	13.9
Infratest dimap	25 Apr 1998	–	36	45	6	5	4	2		2	9
Emnid	24 Apr 1998	–	35	43	6	6	5	–		5	8
Infratest dimap	18 Apr 1998	–	36	45	6	5	4	2		2	9
Emnid	17 Apr 1998	–	36	41	6	6	5	–		6	5
Forschungsgruppe Wahlen	17 Apr 1998	–	35	43	8	5	4	–	–	5	8
Forsa	16 Apr 1998	–	35	43	6	5	5	–		6	8
Infratest dimap	11 Apr 1998	–	35	45	6	5	4	2		3	10
Emnid	10 Apr 1998	–	35	41	7	6	4	–		7	6
Forsa	8 Apr 1998	–	34	44	6	5	6	–		5	10
Infratest dimap	4 Apr 1998	–	34	46	6	5	4	2		3	12
Emnid	3 Apr 1998	–	36	41	7	5	4	–		7	5
Forsa	2 Apr 1998	–	34	44	6	5	6	–		5	10
Allensbach	25 Mar 1998	–	32.1	42.7	10.2	5.8	5.4	2.0	–	1.8	10.6
Forschungsgruppe Wahlen	13 Mar 1998	–	36	41	9	5	4	–	–	5	5
Forschungsgruppe Wahlen	13 Feb 1998	–	37	39	10	6	4	–	–	4	2
Forschungsgruppe Wahlen	16 Jan 1998	–	37	38	10	6	4	–	–	5	1
Forschungsgruppe Wahlen	Dec 1997	–	37	38	10	6	4	–	–	5	1
Forschungsgruppe Wahlen	Nov 1997	–	37	38	10	6	4	–	–	5	1
Forschungsgruppe Wahlen	Oct 1997	–	38	38	9	6	4	–	–	5	Tie
Forschungsgruppe Wahlen	Sep 1997	–	37	39	9	6	4	–	–	5	2
Forschungsgruppe Wahlen	Aug 1997	–	36	40	10	6	4	–	–	4	4
Forschungsgruppe Wahlen	Jun 1997	–	37	38	11	6	4	–	–	4	1
Forschungsgruppe Wahlen	May 1997	–	38	38	10	5	4	–	–	5	Tie
Forschungsgruppe Wahlen	Apr 1997	–	39	36	11	5	4	–	–	5	3
Forschungsgruppe Wahlen	Mar 1997	–	39	35	12	5	4	–	–	5	4
Forschungsgruppe Wahlen	Feb 1997	–	40	35	11	5	4	–	–	5	5
Forschungsgruppe Wahlen	Jan 1997	–	42	33	12	5	4	–	–	4	9
Forschungsgruppe Wahlen	Dec 1996	–	42	34	12	5	4	–	–	3	8
Forschungsgruppe Wahlen	Nov 1996	–	42	34	12	5	4	–	–	3	8
Forschungsgruppe Wahlen	Oct 1996	–	41	35	11	5	4	–	–	4	6
Forschungsgruppe Wahlen	Sep 1996	–	41	35	11	5	4	–	–	4	6
Forschungsgruppe Wahlen	Aug 1996	–	41	35	11	5	4	–	–	4	6
Forschungsgruppe Wahlen	Jun 1996	–	42	33	12	6	4	–	–	3	9
Forschungsgruppe Wahlen	May 1996	–	43	32	12	6	4	–	–	3	11
Forschungsgruppe Wahlen	Apr 1996	–	43	31	12	6	4	–	–	3	12
Forschungsgruppe Wahlen	Mar 1996	–	44	33	12	4	4	–	–	3	11
Forschungsgruppe Wahlen	Feb 1996	–	43	33	12	4	4	–	–	4	10
Forschungsgruppe Wahlen	Jan 1996	–	44	32	12	4	4	–	–	4	12
Forschungsgruppe Wahlen	Dec 1995	–	42	34	12	5	4	–	–	3	8
Forschungsgruppe Wahlen	Nov 1995	–	42	34	12	5	4	–	–	3	8
Forschungsgruppe Wahlen	Oct 1995	–	41	35	11	5	4	–	–	4	6
Forschungsgruppe Wahlen	Sep 1995	–	41	35	11	5	4	–	–	4	6
Forschungsgruppe Wahlen	Jul 1995	–	41	35	11	5	4	–	–	4	6
Forschungsgruppe Wahlen	Jun 1995	–	42	36	10	4	4	–	–	4	6
Forschungsgruppe Wahlen	May 1995	–	42	36	10	4	4	–	–	4	6
Forschungsgruppe Wahlen	Apr 1995	–	41	37	9	5	4	–	–	4	4
Forschungsgruppe Wahlen	Mar 1995	–	41	37	9	5	4	–	–	4	4
Forschungsgruppe Wahlen	Feb 1995	–	41	37	9	5	4	–	–	4	4
Forschungsgruppe Wahlen	Jan 1995	–	42	37	9	5	4	–	–	3	5
Forschungsgruppe Wahlen	Dec 1994	–	43	36	9	5	4	–	–	3	7
Forschungsgruppe Wahlen	Nov 1994	–	42	37	8	6	4	–	–	3	5
1994 federal election	16 Oct 1994	–	41.4	36.4	7.3	6.9	4.4	1.9	–	1.7	5.0

== Results ==

Party	Party-list			Constituency			Total seats	±
Party	Votes	%	Seats	Votes	%	Seats	Total seats	±
Social Democratic Party	20,181,269	40.93	86	21,535,893	43.80	212	298	+46
Christian Democratic Union	14,004,908	28.40	124	15,854,215	32.25	74	198	−46
Christian Social Union	3,324,480	6.74	9	3,602,472	7.33	38	47	−3
Alliance 90/The Greens	3,301,624	6.70	47	2,448,162	4.98	0	47	−2
Free Democratic Party	3,080,955	6.25	43	1,486,433	3.02	0	43	−4
Party of Democratic Socialism	2,515,454	5.10	32	2,416,781	4.92	4	36	+6
The Republicans	906,383	1.84	0	1,115,664	2.27	0	0	0
German People's Union	601,192	1.22	0				0	New
Initiative Pro D-Mark	430,099	0.87	0				0	New
The Grays – Gray Panthers	152,557	0.31	0	141,763	0.29	0	0	0
Human Environment Animal Protection Party	133,832	0.27	0	1,734	0.00	0	0	0
National Democratic Party	126,571	0.26	0	45,043	0.09	0	0	0
Federation of Free Citizens – The Offensive	121,196	0.25	0	134,795	0.27	0	0	New
Ecological Democratic Party	98,257	0.20	0	145,308	0.30	0	0	0
Party of Bible-abiding Christians	71,941	0.15	0	46,379	0.09	0	0	0
Anarchist Pogo Party	35,242	0.07	0	1,676	0.00	0	0	New
Natural Law Party	30,619	0.06	0	35,132	0.07	0	0	0
Feminist Party	30,094	0.06	0	3,966	0.01	0	0	New
Chance 2000	28,566	0.06	0	3,206	0.01	0	0	New
Bavaria Party	28,107	0.06	0	1,772	0.00	0	0	0
Family Party	24,825	0.05	0	8,134	0.02	0	0	0
Christian Centre	23,619	0.05	0	9,023	0.02	0	0	0
Bürgerrechtsbewegung Solidarität	9,662	0.02	0	10,260	0.02	0	0	0
Party of the Non-voters	6,827	0.01	0				0	New
Car-drivers' and Citizens' Interests Party	6,759	0.01	0	1,458	0.00	0	0	0
Party for Social Equality	6,226	0.01	0				0	0
Alliance for Germany	6,196	0.01	0	1,946	0.00	0	0	New
Party of the Willing to Work and Socially Vulnerable	5,556	0.01	0	10,449	0.02	0	0	0
Marxist–Leninist Party	4,731	0.01	0	7,208	0.01	0	0	0
New Forum	4,543	0.01	0	6,296	0.01	0	0	New
Alternative Citizens' Movement 2000	3,355	0.01	0	4,097	0.01	0	0	New
Democratic Party	2,432	0.00	0	1,172	0.00	0	0	New
Humanist Party	435	0.00	0	532	0.00	0	0	0
German Social Union				8,180	0.02	0	0	0
Statt Party				4,406	0.01	0	0	0
German Communist Party				2,105	0.00	0	0	0
Centre Party				2,076	0.00	0	0	0
Middle Class Party				1,924	0.00	0	0	New
Free Social Union				763	0.00	0	0	0
Freedom Party				131	0.00	0	0	New
Independents and voter groups				66,026	0.13	0	0	0
Total	49,308,512	100.00	341	49,166,580	100.00	328	669	−3
Valid votes	49,308,512	98.72		49,166,580	98.44			
Invalid/blank votes	638,575	1.28		780,507	1.56			
Total votes	49,947,087	100.00		49,947,087	100.00			
Registered voters/turnout	60,762,751	82.20		60,762,751	82.20			
Source: Bundeswahlleiter

=== Results by state ===
Second vote (Zweitstimme, or votes for party list)

State results in %	SPD	CDU/CSU	GRÜNE	FDP	PDS	REP	DVU	all others
Baden-Württemberg	35.6	37.8	9.2	8.8	1.0	4.0	0.6	3.0
Bavaria	34.4	47.7	5.9	5.1	0.7	2.6	0.6	3.0
Berlin	37.8	23.7	11.3	4.9	13.5	2.4	2.1	4.3
Brandenburg	43.9	20.7	3.4	2.8	20.0	1.7	2.8	4.7
Bremen	50.2	25.4	11.3	5.9	2.4	0.7	1.7	2.4
Hamburg	45.8	30.0	10.8	6.5	2.3	0.6	2.1	1.9
Hesse	41.6	34.7	8.2	7.9	1.5	2.3	1.0	2.8
Mecklenburg-Vorpommern	35.3	29.3	3.0	2.2	23.6	0.6	2.7	3.3
Lower Saxony	49.4	34.1	5.9	6.4	1.0	0.9	0.6	1.7
North Rhine-Westphalia	46.9	33.8	6.9	7.3	1.2	1.1	0.9	1.9
Rhineland-Palatinate	41.3	39.1	6.1	7.1	1.0	2.2	0.7	2.5
Saarland	52.4	31.8	5.5	4.7	1.0	1.2	0.9	2.5
Saxony	29.1	32.7	4.4	3.7	20.0	1.9	2.6	5.6
Saxony-Anhalt	38.1	27.2	3.3	4.1	20.7	0.6	3.2	2.8
Schleswig-Holstein	45.4	35.7	6.5	7.6	1.5	0.4	1.3	1.6
Thuringia	34.5	28.9	3.9	3.4	21.2	1.6	2.9	3.6

==== Constituency seats ====
State	Total seats	Seats won			
State	Total seats	SPD	CDU	CSU	PDS
Baden-Württemberg	37	11	26		
Bavaria	45	7		38	
Berlin	13	9			4
Brandenburg	12	12			
Bremen	3	3			
Hamburg	7	7			
Hesse	22	18	4		
Lower Saxony	31	27	4		
Mecklenburg-Vorpommern	9	7	2		
North Rhine-Westphalia	71	53	18		
Rhineland-Palatinate	16	10	6		
Saarland	5	5			
Saxony	21	8	13		
Saxony-Anhalt	13	13			
Schleswig-Holstein	11	11			
Thuringia	12	11	1		
Total	328	212	74	38	4

==== List seats ====
State	Total seats	Seats won					
State	Total seats	CDU	SPD	Grüne	FDP	PDS	CSU
Baden-Württemberg	41	6	19	8	7	1	
Bavaria	48		27	6	5	1	9
Berlin	12	7	1	3	1		
Brandenburg	11	5		1	1	4	
Bremen	2	1		1			
Hamburg	6	4		1	1		
Hesse	25	13	3	4	4	1	
Lower Saxony	37	20	8	4	4	1	
Mecklenburg-Vorpommern	6	2				4	
North Rhine-Westphalia	77	34	19	11	11	2	
Rhineland-Palatinate	18	8	5	2	3		
Saarland	3	3					
Saxony	16		4	2	2	8	
Saxony-Anhalt	13	6		1	1	5	
Schleswig-Holstein	13	9		2	2		
Thuringia	13	6		1	1	5	
Total	341	124	86	47	43	32	9

== Post-election ==
=== Results ===
Seat results – SPD in red, Greens in green, PDS in purple, FDP in yellow, CDU/CSU in black

Result by Single-member constituency – SPD in red, PDS in purple, CDU/CSU in black

Toward the end of the campaign, polls placed the CDU/CSU and FDP coalition in a tie with the SPD and Green coalition. Despite these polls, the final numbers told a different story. The SPD-Green coalition won an unexpectedly large victory, taking 345 seats and earning a strong majority in the Bundestag—the first centre-left absolute majority in post-World War II Germany. The SPD won 40.9 percent of the vote, due to an increase of 4.5 percent from 1994.

The CDU/CSU-FDP coalition had gone into the election with a solid majority and 341 seats, but was cut down to 288 seats. The CDU/CSU lost 6.2% of its 1994 vote, and lost 109 electoral districts to the SPD. Germany's mixed-member proportional system, in which a slate of statewide delegates are elected alongside the electorate delegates, softened the blow somewhat, so the CDU/CSU only suffered a net loss of 49 seats. It was still the CDU/CSU's worst defeat ever. By contrast, their junior coalition partner, the FDP, netted a loss of just 4 seats.

The SPD swept all single-member constituency seats in the states of Brandenburg, Saxony-Anhalt, Saarland, Bremen, Hamburg and (for the first and last time) Schleswig-Holstein. Kohl lost his own constituency of Ludwigshafen, though he was still re-elected to the Bundestag through the Rhineland-Palatinate CDU party list, and he had not won the seat in the 1983 and 1987 elections. Future Chancellor Angela Merkel only narrowly won her constituency of Stralsund – Rügen – Grimmen with only 37.3 percent of the vote; the only time she got less than 40 percent of the vote.

A new government was formed by a coalition between the SPD and the Greens, with the SPD's Gerhard Schröder as chancellor and Greens leader Joschka Fischer as vice-chancellor and foreign minister. It was the first red-green coalition government at the federal level in Germany, as well as the first purely centre-left government in post-World War II Germany.

Kohl stepped down as chairman of the CDU, as did CSU chairman Theodor Waigel.

=== Legacy ===
The 1998 German election was historic in many ways. It resulted in a centre-right government being succeeded by a left-wing one—the first in postwar Germany (the SPD's previous term in government had been at the helm of a centre-left coalition).

In addition, it brought to an end the sixteen-year rule of Kohl – the second-longest of any German chancellor, and the longest tenure for a democratically elected head of government in German history. It has been compared to the defeat of Winston Churchill in 1945 – both were seen as conservative wartime leaders, and in both cases both were turned out of office by the electorate once the war was over. Churchill was ousted before World War II was even over, while Kohl managed to hang onto power for two more terms after the reunification of Germany (which is often considered to be the end of the Cold War).

== Literature ==
- Conradt, David P.; Kleinfeld, Gerald R.; Søe, Christian, eds. (2000). Power Shift in Germany: The 1998 Election and the End of the Kohl Era. Berghahn Books.
