= Pur et dur =

Term used for the Quebec independence movement

Pur et dur (French: [pyʁ ɛ dyʁ]; a common expression in French literally meaning "pure and hard") is a term used in Quebec politics to refer to hardliners of the Parti Québécois and the Quebec independence movement. It is most commonly used in the media, where it was popularized. It is also used to criticize some members of the Parti Québécois. Some within the party resent the use of the term by the media, but some have embraced it. It is similar to the term "SNP fundamentalist", used in Scottish politics for a faction of the Scottish National Party, another pro-independence party.

Many of the first "purs et durs" came from the Rassemblement pour l'indépendance nationale who, through entryism, joined the Parti Québécois in the early days of the 1960s. They are associated with strong opinions about independence (including the need to attain it quickly, the question of an eventual supranational union, or "sovereignty-association", and the question of the "étapisme" approach) and language protection. Some also criticize the party for not being social democratic enough.

These militants have famously made the leadership of the Parti Québécois a test and daunting task. The media has tied the resignation of every former PQ leader except Jacques Parizeau to the disapproval of the "pur et dur", especially in the case of Pierre-Marc Johnson. Parizeau, a former Premier of Quebec, has sometimes been portrayed as "pur et dur."

== Examples ==
These are people having been portrayed by some as purs et durs, while this "status" is debatable.

- André Joli-Coeur
- Denis Lazure
- Jacques Parizeau
- Jean-Claude St-André
- Josée Legault
- Patrick Bourgeois
- Paul Bégin
- Pierre Bourgault
- Pierre Falardeau
- Robert Laplante
- Robin Philpot
- Yves Michaud

Two notable exceptions are Guy Bertrand and Gilles Grégoire. Both are founding members of the Parti Québécois, but have (or had) come to be disowned by the purs et durs.

Bertrand was called, by René Lévesque, an "ayatollah in bedroom slippers," mostly because of his vigorous attempts to get the PQ to declare unilateral independence, but later wrote that an "intolerant, ethnocentric, egocentric" Québécois nationalism has been the bane of Quebec and Canada. A skilled lawyer, he has taken his anti-separatism cause to court several times.

Grégoire was a founding member and elected to the National Assembly of Quebec twice but was cast out when he was convicted of having sex with minor girls and sentenced to jail. He died in 2006.

== See also ==
- Pure laine
- Quebec sovereignty movement
- Quebec nationalism
- Québécois (word)
- SNP fundamentalist
- Fundi - equivalent term in Green politics
