= Marcos Archambault =

Quebec politician

Marcos Archambault MNA

Member of the National Assembly for Louis-Hébert
- Incumbent
- Assumed office October 5, 2026
- Preceded by: Geneviève Guilbault

Personal details
- Party: Quebec Conservative Party
- Other political affiliations: Parti Québécois
- Education: Université Laval; University of Ottawa; McGill University
- Website: conservateur.quebec/candidat/louis-hebert/

Marcos Archambault is a Quebec politician who was the elected to the National Assembly of Quebec for Louis-Hébert in the 2026 Quebec general election as a member of the Quebec Conservative Party. He holds a bachelor's degree from Université Laval.

He is a former member of the Parti Québécois. At age 19 he was a candidate in the 2012 Quebec general election where he contested Nelligan. At the 2014 Quebec general election he contested Vaudreuil.

== Electoral record ==
2026 Quebec general election: Louis-Hébert
** Preliminary results — Not yet official **
| Party | Candidate | Votes | % | ±% |
|---|---|---|---|---|
| Conservative | Marcos Archambault | 11,571 | 29.07 | |
| Parti Québécois | Chloé Fauchon | 10,607 | 26.64 | |
| Liberal | Richard Bélanger | 9,048 | 22.73 | |
| Coalition Avenir Québec | Marc-Antoine Bernier | 5,196 | 13.05 | |
| Québec solidaire | Anne-Sophie Roy | 3,163 | 7.95 | |
| Independent | Vincent Bégin | 154 | 0.39 | |
| Présence | Jean-François Grenier | 71 | 0.18 | |
| Total valid votes | | | | |
| Total rejected ballots | | | | |
| Turnout | | | 83.31 | |
| Electors on the lists | | | | |
Source: Élections Québec

2014 Quebec general election
| Party | Candidate | Votes | % | ±% |
|---|---|---|---|---|
| Liberal | Marie-Claude Nichols | 27,750 | 61.19 | +16.12 |
| Parti Québécois | Marcos Archambault | 7,238 | 15.96 | -4.75 |
| Coalition Avenir Québec | Luc Tison | 7,084 | 15.62 | -10.00 |
| Québec solidaire | David Fortin Côté | 2,101 | 4.63 | -0.25 |
| Green | Thomas Radcliffe | 584 | 1.29 | -1.19 |
| Conservative | Michel Paul | 196 | 0.43 | – |
| Parti équitable | Julien Leclerc | 190 | 0.42 | – |
| Option nationale | Jean-Gabriel Cauchon | 115 | 0.25 | -0.78 |
| Mon pays le Québec | Léon Dupré | 90 | 0.20 | – |
| Total valid votes | | 45,348 | 98.95 | – |
| Total rejected ballots | | 528 | 1.15 | – |
| Turnout | | 45,876 | 77.99 | +1.56 |
| Electors on the lists | | 58,822 | – | – |

2012 Quebec general election
| Party | Candidate | Votes | % | ±% |
|---|---|---|---|---|
| Liberal | Yolande James | 27,470 | 66.31 | -5.88 |
| Coalition Avenir Québec | Philippe Boileau | 7,654 | 18.48 | +12.81* |
| Parti Québécois | Marcos Archambault | 3,716 | 8.97 | -5.49 |
| Green | Kristianne Brunet | 1,238 | 2.99 | -3.19 |
| Québec solidaire | Elahé Machouf | 966 | 2.33 | +0.83 |
| Option nationale | François Landry | 292 | 0.70 | – |
| Quebec Citizens' Union | Jean-Dominic Lévesque-René | 89 | 0.21 | – |
| Total valid votes | | 41,425 | 99.43 | |
| Total rejected ballots | | 237 | 0.57 | |
| Turnout | | 41,662 | 73.21 | +26.17 |
| Electors on the lists | | 56,909 | – | – |
