= Geneviève Guilbault =

Canadian politician (born 1982)

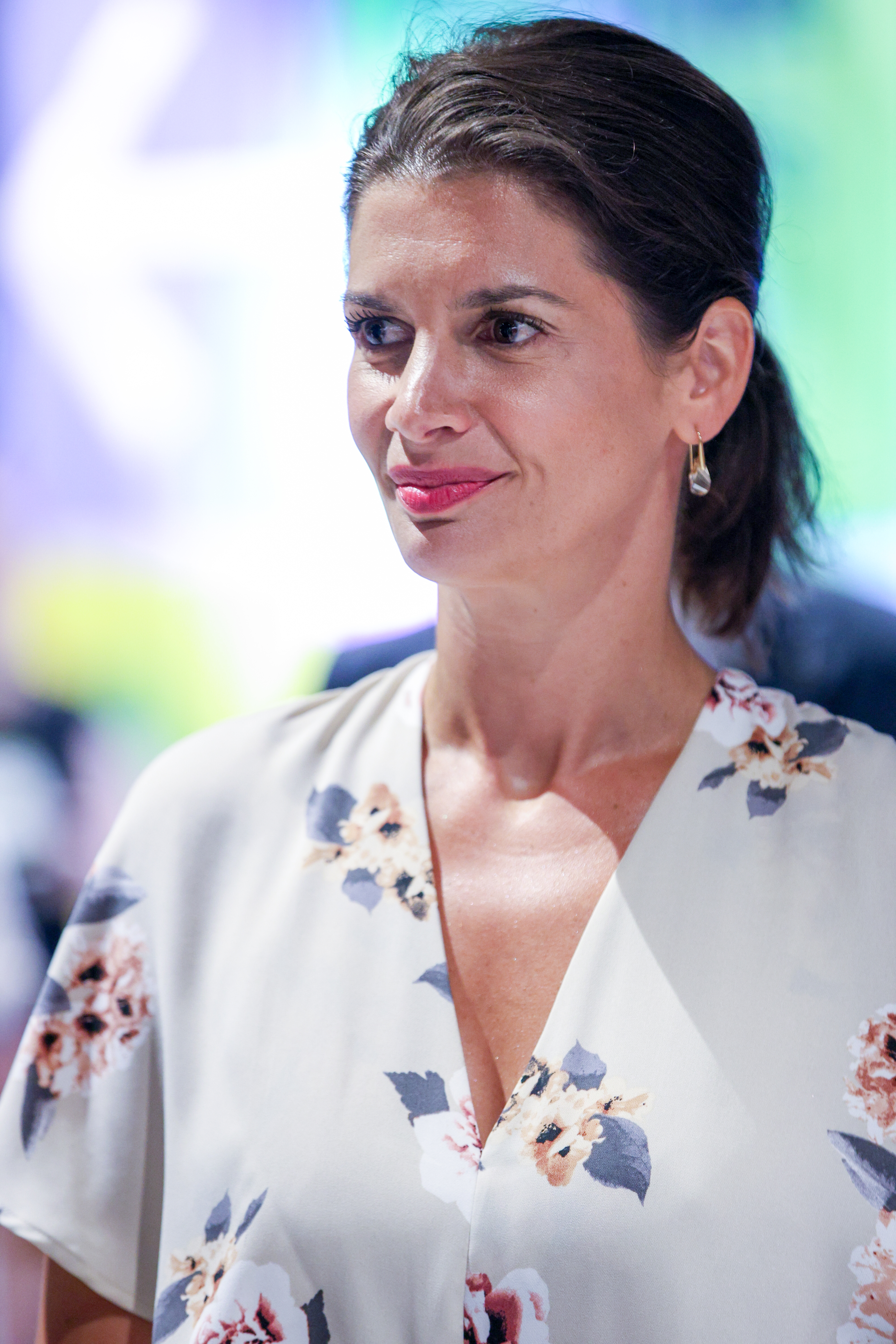
- Guilbault in 2023

Deputy Premier of Quebec
- In office October 18, 2018 – September 10, 2025
- Premier: François Legault
- Preceded by: Dominique Anglade
- Succeeded by: Ian Lafrenière (2026)

Quebec Minister of Minister of Municipal Affairs
- In office September 10, 2025 – April 21, 2026
- Preceded by: Andrée Laforest
- Succeeded by: Samuel Poulin

Quebec Minister of Transport
- In office October 20, 2022 – September 10, 2025
- Preceded by: François Bonnardel
- Succeeded by: Jonatan Julien

Quebec Minister of Public Security
- In office October 18, 2018 – October 20, 2022
- Preceded by: Martin Coiteux
- Succeeded by: François Bonnardel

Member of the National Assembly of Quebec for Louis-Hébert
- In office October 2, 2017 – August 27, 2026
- Preceded by: Sam Hamad
- Succeeded by: Marcos Archambault

Personal details
- Born: November 4, 1982 (age 43) Greenfield Park, Quebec, Canada
- Party: Coalition Avenir Québec
- Other political affiliations: Quebec Liberal Party (until 2006)
- Education: Université Laval
- Profession: Communications Officer, Political Advisor

Geneviève Guilbault (French pronunciation: [ʒənvjɛv gilbo]; born November 4, 1982) is a Canadian politician who served as deputy premier of Quebec from 2018 to 2025. A member of the Coalition Avenir Québec, she was elected to the National Assembly of Quebec in a by-election held in the electoral district Louis-Hébert in 2017. She served in the Legault ministry from 2018 to 2026, holding numerous positions. On October 18, 2018, she was appointed Deputy Premier and Minister of Public Safety.

== Life and career ==
Guilbault studied public communication at Université Laval, where she obtained a bachelor's degree in 2006 and a master's degree in 2011.

From 2006 to 2008, she was assistant press secretary to Jacques Dupuis, a Quebec cabinet minister. She then worked with the Secrétariat du Conseil du trésor and the Quebec Ministry of Public Security. She was previously a member of the Quebec Liberal Party.

Before her election to the legislature, she also worked as a communications officer for the provincial coroner's office.

On December 27, 2017, she gave birth to her daughter, Capucine. On January 4, 2020, she gave birth to her son Christophe, her second child since entering the National Assembly.

== Political career ==
She had previously planned to run for the CAQ in the electoral district of Charlesbourg in the 2018 provincial election. In 2017, incumbent Liberal MNA Sam Hamad resigned his seat for the riding of Louis-Hébert, triggering a by-election. The CAQ initially chose banker Normand Sauvageau to represent the party, but following controversial revelations, he resigned as the candidate, and the party turned to Guilbault. She was elected MNA for Louis-Hébert in the by-election on October 2, 2017. She won the election with 51% of the vote, far ahead of her opponents. François Legault described her as a "new star of politics" and saw this victory as a prelude to the party's success in the 2018 Quebec general election.

She was sworn in on October 16, 2017, and was given the mandate of spokesperson for the second opposition group on family matters. She was a prominent campaigner for the party in the 2018 general election.

=== In government ===
She was re-elected with 44.6% of the vote in an election that delivered a majority government for the CAQ. She was appointed to the Executive Council of Quebec as Deputy Premier, Minister of Public Security, and Minister responsible for the Capitale-Nationale region.

In September 2019, she was forced to apologize after disparaging members of her staff. The incident prompted the official opposition to call for her resignation as minister. As the minister responsible for the Capitale-Nationale region, she was criticized for not respecting the autonomy of the municipal level.

On October 20, 2022, she was re-appointed Deputy Premier and appointed Minister of Transport following her re-election, replacing François Bonnardel. In August 2023, she apologized after being seen without a seatbelt in several social media posts. The minister claimed these were oversights, but experts pointed out that she should set an example as the person responsible for the Highway Safety Code. She faced criticism from local officials due to the Rivière-du-Loup-Saint-Siméon Ferry relocation.

As minister, she was at the centre of the SAAQclic scandal. In December 2024, the SAAQ was criticized for failing to publish the Société de l'assurance automobile du Québec's (SAAQ) 2023 management report within the prescribed timeframe. The National Assembly mandated a commission to investigate this omission, and the President of the National Assembly ruled that it constituted contempt of the chamber. The SAAQ then issued a public apology, acknowledging that the chaotic implementation of the SAAQclic system had resulted in significant delays and a $122 million deficit, while admitting that the reliability of the financial data remained uncertain due to a lack of transaction tracking. As part of the implementation of SAAQclic, Guilbault was directly involved in crisis management. She states that she was proactive from the moment she took over as Minister of Transport, meeting regularly with SAAQ management and holding online meetings seven days a week to manage the problems related to the platform's deployment. Quebec's Auditor General revealed that erroneous or incomplete information had been provided to government authorities regarding the project's progress. In February 2025, while the opposition was calling for resignations within the government, Guilbault referred the matter to the Permanent Anti-Corruption Unit (UPAC), requesting an investigation into the issues raised by the Auditor General, including conflicts of interest, manipulation of strategic information, and the splitting of contracts that allegedly concealed a $222 million cost overrun identified as early as the start of the election. She was then removed as deputy premier and transport minister, given the position of municipal affairs minister.

Described as a potential candidate in the 2026 Coalition Avenir Québec leadership election, Guilbault announced in January 2026 that she would not seek re-election in that year's election and would retire from politics.

== Electoral record ==
2022 Quebec general election: Louis-Hébert
Party	Candidate	Votes	%	±%
Coalition Avenir Québec	Geneviève Guilbault	17,803	47.21	+2.62
Parti Québécois	Victor Dubuc	6,228	16.52	+4.09
Conservative	Marika Robitaille	5,509	14.61	+12.30
Québec solidaire	Steven Lachance	4,537	12.03	+0.97
Liberal	Dominic Cardinal	3,283	8.71	-17.91
Green	Daydree Vendette	285	0.76	-0.75
Démocratie directe	Jean-Pierre Hamel	33	0.09	–
Équipe Autonomiste	Yolaine Brochu	32	0.08	+0.02
Total valid votes		37,710	99.18	–
Total rejected ballots		310	0.82	–
Turnout		38,020	81.09	
Electors on the lists		46,888	–	–

2018 Quebec general election: Louis-Hébert
Party	Candidate	Votes	%	±%
Coalition Avenir Québec	Geneviève Guilbault	16,248	44.59	-6.45
Liberal	Julie-Maude Perron	9,700	26.62	+7.91
Parti Québécois	Normand Beauregard	4,529	12.43	-3.89
Québec solidaire	Guillaume Boivin	4,030	11.06	+5.85
Conservative	Natalie Bjerke	841	2.31	-1.81
Green	Daydree Vendette	550	1.51	-0.55
NDP (2014) (2014)	Caroline Côté	276	0.76	-0.59
Independent	Vincent Bégin	244	0.67	-0.24
Équipe Autonomiste	Jean-Luc Rouckout	22	0.06	-0.02
Total valid votes		36,440	98.76	
Total rejected ballots		456	1.24	
Turnout		36,896	80.52	
Eligible voters		45,821		
Coalition Avenir Québec hold		Swing		-7.18
Source(s) "Rapport des résultats officiels du scrutin". Élections Québec.

Quebec provincial by-election, October 2, 2017: Louis-Hébert Resignation of Sam Hamad
Party	Candidate	Votes	%	±%
Coalition Avenir Québec	Geneviève Guilbault	12,091	51.04	+25.12
Liberal	Ihssane El Ghernati	4,433	18.71	-30.51
Parti Québécois	Normand Beauregard	3,852	16.26	-2.11
Québec solidaire	Guillaume Boivin	1,235	5.21	+0.27
Conservative	Sylvie Asselin	976	4.12	+3.29
Green	Alex Tyrrell	487	2.06	–
New Democratic	Denis Blanchette	319	1.35	–
Independent	Vincent Bégin	215	0.91	–
Option nationale	Martin St-Louis	61	0.26	-0.45
Équipe Autonomiste	Jean-Luc Rouckout	18	0.08	–
Total valid votes		23,687	99.20	
Total rejected ballots		190	0.80	
Turnout		23,877	52.43	
Electors on the lists		45,540	–	
Coalition Avenir Québec gain from Liberal		Swing		+27.82
