= Louis-Hébert (provincial electoral district) =

Provincial electoral district in Quebec, Canada

Coordinates: 46°46′30″N 71°17′50″W

Quebec electoral district

Provincial electoral district
- Legislature: National Assembly of Quebec
MNA
Marcos Archambault
Conservative
- District created: 1965
- First contested: 1966
- Last contested: 2026

Demographics
- Population (2011): 56,275
- Electors (2012): 44,155
- Area (km²): 172.5
- Pop. density (per km²): 326.2
- Census division: Quebec City (part)
- Census subdivision(s): Quebec City (part), Saint-Augustin-de-Desmaures

Louis-Hébert (French pronunciation: [lwi ebɛʁ]) is a provincial electoral district in the Capitale-Nationale region of Quebec, Canada. It consists of part of the Sainte-Foy–Sillery–Cap-Rouge borough of Quebec City (specifically the neighbourhoods of Cap-Rouge, Champigny, Jouvence, Quartier Laurentien, Lorette, Les Grands-Déserts and parts of Pointe-de-Sainte-Foy and Place-Notre-Dame), as well as all of Saint-Augustin-de-Desmaures.

It was created for the 1966 election from parts of Québec-Comté and Québec-Ouest and a small part of Portneuf electoral districts.

In the change from the 2001 to the 2011 electoral map, it gained Saint-Augustin-de-Desmaures from La Peltrie; it also gained part of Quebec City from La Peltrie, but lost part of the city to Jean-Talon.

The riding was named after the first legal farmer of New France, Louis Hébert.

== Members of the Legislative Assembly / National Assembly ==
Legislature	Years	Member	Party
Riding created from Portneuf, Québec-Comté and Québec-Ouest
28th	1966–1970	Jean Lesage	Liberal
29th	1970–1973	Claude Castonguay	Liberal
30th	1973–1976	Gaston Desjardins	Liberal
31st	1976–1981	Claude Morin	Parti Québécois
32nd	1981–1981	Claude Morin	Parti Québécois
32nd	1982–1985	Rejean Doyon	Liberal
33rd	1985–1989	Rejean Doyon	Liberal
34th	1989–1994	Rejean Doyon	Liberal
35th	1994–1998	Paul Bégin	Parti Québécois
36th	1998–2002	Paul Bégin	Parti Québécois
36th	2002–2003	Paul Bégin	Independent
37th	2003–2007	Sam Hamad	Liberal
38th	2007–2008	Sam Hamad	Liberal
39th	2008–2012	Sam Hamad	Liberal
40th	2012–2014	Sam Hamad	Liberal
41st	2014–2017	Sam Hamad	Liberal
41st	2017–2018	Geneviève Guilbault	Coalition Avenir Québec
42nd	2018–2022	Geneviève Guilbault	Coalition Avenir Québec
43rd	2022–2026	Geneviève Guilbault	Coalition Avenir Québec
44th	2026–Present	Marcos Archambault	Conservative

== Election results ==
2026 Quebec general election
** Preliminary results — Not yet official **
Party	Candidate	Votes	%	±%
Conservative	Marcos Archambault	11,571	29.07	
Parti Québécois	Chloé Fauchon	10,607	26.64	
Liberal	Richard Bélanger	9,048	22.73	
Coalition Avenir Québec	Marc-Antoine Bernier	5,196	13.05	
Québec solidaire	Anne-Sophie Roy	3,163	7.95	
Independent	Vincent Bégin	154	0.39	
Présence	Jean-François Grenier	71	0.18	
Total valid votes				
Total rejected ballots				
Turnout			83.31	
Electors on the lists				
Source: Élections Québec

2022 Quebec general election
Party	Candidate	Votes	%	±%
Coalition Avenir Québec	Geneviève Guilbault	17,803	47.21	+2.62
Parti Québécois	Victor Dubuc	6,228	16.52	+4.09
Conservative	Marika Robitaille	5,509	14.61	+12.30
Québec solidaire	Steven Lachance	4,537	12.03	+0.97
Liberal	Dominic Cardinal	3,283	8.71	-17.91
Green	Daydree Vendette	285	0.76	-0.75
Démocratie directe	Jean-Pierre Hamel	33	0.09	–
Équipe Autonomiste	Yolaine Brochu	32	0.08	+0.02
Total valid votes		37,710	99.18	–
Total rejected ballots		310	0.82	–
Turnout		38,020	81.09	
Electors on the lists		46,888	–	–

2018 Quebec general election
Party	Candidate	Votes	%	±%
Coalition Avenir Québec	Geneviève Guilbault	16,248	44.59	-6.45
Liberal	Julie-Maude Perron	9,700	26.62	+7.91
Parti Québécois	Normand Beauregard	4,529	12.43	-3.89
Québec solidaire	Guillaume Boivin	4,030	11.06	+5.85
Conservative	Natalie Bjerke	841	2.31	-1.81
Green	Daydree Vendette	550	1.51	-0.55
NDP (2014) (2014)	Caroline Côté	276	0.76	-0.59
Independent	Vincent Bégin	244	0.67	-0.24
Équipe Autonomiste	Jean-Luc Rouckout	22	0.06	-0.02
Total valid votes		36,440	98.76	
Total rejected ballots		456	1.24	
Turnout		36,896	80.52	
Eligible voters		45,821		
Coalition Avenir Québec hold		Swing		-7.18
Source(s) "Rapport des résultats officiels du scrutin". Élections Québec.

Quebec provincial by-election, October 2, 2017 On the resignation of Sam Hamad
Party	Candidate	Votes	%	±%
Coalition Avenir Québec	Geneviève Guilbault	12,091	51.04	+25.12
Liberal	Ihssane El Ghernati	4,433	18.71	-30.51
Parti Québécois	Normand Beauregard	3,852	16.26	-2.11
Québec solidaire	Guillaume Boivin	1,235	5.21	+0.27
Conservative	Sylvie Asselin	976	4.12	+3.29
Green	Alex Tyrrell	487	2.06	–
New Democratic	Denis Blanchette	319	1.35	–
Independent	Vincent Bégin	215	0.91	–
Option nationale	Martin St-Louis	61	0.26	-0.45
Équipe Autonomiste	Jean-Luc Rouckout	18	0.08	–
Total valid votes		23,687	99.20	
Total rejected ballots		190	0.80	
Turnout		23,877	52.43	
Electors on the lists		45,540	–	
Coalition Avenir Québec gain from Liberal		Swing		+27.82

2014 Quebec general election
Party	Candidate	Votes	%	±%
Liberal	Sam Hamad	18,327	49.22	+10.80
Coalition Avenir Québec	Mario Asselin	9,650	25.92	-7.00
Parti Québécois	Patrice Dallaire	6,841	18.37	-3.01
Québec solidaire	Pascal Minville	1,840	4.94	+1.37
Conservative	Dany Bergeron	310	0.83	+0.45
Option nationale	Patrick Côté	266	0.71	-1.14
Total valid votes		37,234	99.15	–
Total rejected ballots		320	0.85	+0.03
Turnout		37,554	83.66	-2.91
Electors on the lists		44,887	–	–
Liberal hold		Swing		+8.90

2012 Quebec general election
Party	Candidate	Votes	%	±%
Liberal	Sam Hamad	14,602	38.42	-8.22
Coalition Avenir Québec	Michel Hamel	12,510	32.92	+10.35
Parti Québécois	Rosette Côté	8,127	21.38	-5.19
Québec solidaire	Guillaume Boivin	1,359	3.58	+1.13
Option nationale	Sol Zanetti	706	1.86	–
Parti nul	Julie Lachance	226	0.59	–
Coalition pour la constituante	Guillaume Dion	209	0.55	–
Conservative	Véronique Durand	146	0.38	–
Équipe Autonomiste	Hugues Fortin	70	0.18	–
Quebec Citizens' Union	Maxime Guérin	49	0.13	–
Total valid votes		38,004	99.18	–
Total rejected ballots		316	0.82	–
Turnout		38,320	86.57	–
Electors on the lists		44,263	–	–
Liberal hold		Swing		-9.29

^ Change is from redistributed results. CAQ change is from ADQ.

2008 Quebec general election redistributed results
Party	Vote	%
Liberal	14,652	46.65
Parti Québécois	8,348	26.58
Action démocratique	7,089	22.57
Québec solidaire	767	2.44
Green	555	1.77

2008 Quebec general election
Party	Candidate	Votes	%	±%
Liberal	Sam Hamad	17,650	48.85	+14.30
Parti Québécois	Françoise Mercure	10,513	29.09	+4.10
Action démocratique	Jean Nobert	5,872	16.25	-16.33
Green	Carl Lavoie	1,068	2.96	-1.20
Québec solidaire	Dominique Gautron	1,031	2.85	-0.33
Total valid votes		36,134	98.97	–
Total rejected ballots		376	1.03	+0.41
Turnout		36,510	70.35	-10.98
Electors on the lists		51,898	–	–
Liberal hold		Swing		+5.10

2007 Quebec general election
Party	Candidate	Votes	%	±%
Liberal	Sam Hamad	14,410	34.54	-9.98
Action démocratique	Jean Nobert	13,594	32.59	+8.99
Parti Québécois	André Joli-Coeur	10,429	25.00	-3.96
Green	André Larocque	1,734	4.16	+2.93
Québec solidaire	Catherine Lebossé	1,326	3.18	+2.18
Christian Democracy	Claude Cloutier	225	0.54	
Total valid votes		41,718	99.38	
Total rejected ballots		259	0.62	-0.09
Turnout		41,977	81.33	+0.20
Electors on the lists		51,615	–	
Liberal hold		Swing		-9.49

2003 Quebec general election
Party	Candidate	Votes	%
Liberal	Sam Hamad	17,938	44.53
Parti Québécois	Line-Sylvie Perron	11,668	28.96
Action démocratique	Guy Laforest	9,505	23.59
Green	Jean-Pierre Guay	493	1.22
UFP	Jean-Philippe Lessard-Beaupré	402	1.00
Bloc Pot	Pierre Laliberté	281	0.70
Total valid votes		40,287	99.30
Total rejected ballots		286	0.70
Turnout		40,573	81.12
Electors on the lists		50,013	–

1998 Quebec general election
Party	Candidate	Votes	%	±%
Parti Québécois	Paul Bégin	14,805	46.13	+6.76
Liberal	Pierre Boulanger	12,967	40.40	+16.50
Action démocratique	Normand Morin	3,977	12.39	+6.69
Socialist Democracy	Claude Pelletier	169	0.53	-0.74
Natural Law	Jean Cerigo	108	0.34	-0.04
Marxist–Leninist	Gisèle Desrochers	70	0.22	
Total valid votes		32,096	99.06	
Total rejected ballots		306	0.94	-0.28
Turnout		32,402	80.88	-4.98
Electors on the lists		40,064	–	
Parti Québécois hold		Swing		-4.87

1995 Quebec referendum
Side	Votes	%
Oui	20,292	53.01
Non	17,990	46.99

1994 Quebec general election
Party	Candidate	Votes	%	±%
Parti Québécois	Paul Bégin	12,905	39.37	-5.45
Independent	André Arthur	9,464	28.87	
Liberal	Silvia Garcia	7,833	23.90	-23.77
Action démocratique	Gaétane Lamontagne	1,868	5.70	
New Democratic	Jean-Guy Gagnon	415	1.27	-0.61
Independent	Serge Montabault	169	0.52	
Natural Law	Réal Croteau	124	0.38	
Total valid votes		32,778	98.78	
Total rejected ballots		405	1.22	-0.61
Turnout		33,183	85.86	+5.16
Electors on the lists		38,649	–	
Parti Québécois gain from Liberal		Swing		+9.16

1992 Charlottetown Accord referendum
Side	Votes	%
Non	21,195	62.51
Oui	12,714	37.49

1989 Quebec general election
Party	Candidate	Votes	%	±%
Liberal	Réjean Doyon	14,822	47.67	-4.24
Parti Québécois	Guy Bertrand	13,937	44.82	+7.14
Green	Gilles Lamontagne	1,657	5.33	
New Democratic	Normand Beauregard	584	1.88	-6.71
Socialist Movement	Normand Boucher	96	0.31	
Total valid votes		31,096	98.17	
Total rejected ballots		581	1.83	+0.79
Turnout		31,677	80.70	+1.05
Electors on the lists		39,255	–	
Liberal hold		Swing		-5.69

1985 Quebec general election
Party	Candidate	Votes	%	±%
Liberal	Réjean Doyon	16,913	51.90	-0.93
Parti Québécois	Louise Beaudoin	12,279	37.68	-6.37
New Democratic	Jean-Paul Harney	2,798	8.59	
Progressive Conservative	Claudette J. Hethrington	287	0.88	
Parti indépendantiste	Emmanuel Le Brasseur	252	0.77	
Christian Socialism	Michel Durocher	58	0.18	
Total valid votes		32,587	98.96	
Total rejected ballots		343	1.04	-1.55
Turnout		32,930	79.64	+15.19
Electors on the lists		41,346	–	
Liberal hold		Swing		+2.72

Quebec provincial by-election, April 5, 1982 Resignation of Claude Morin
Party	Candidate	Votes	%	±%
Liberal	Réjean Doyon	12,665	52.83	+15.99
Parti Québécois	Jean-François Keable	10,560	44.05	-17.31
Independent	Patricia Métivier	404	1.69	
Independent	Michel Marcoux	274	1.14	
Libertarian	Victor Lewis	68	0.28	
Total valid votes		23,971	97.41	
Total rejected ballots		637	2.59	+1.48
Turnout		24,608	64.46	-18.88
Electors on the lists		38,176	–	
Liberal gain from Parti Québécois		Swing		+16.65

1981 Quebec general election
Party	Candidate	Votes	%	±%
Parti Québécois	Claude Morin	20,345	61.36	+3.14
Liberal	Michelle Rousseau Méthot	12,218	36.85	+2.94
Union Nationale	J. Wilfrid Dufresne	473	1.43	-5.47
Marxist–Leninist	Elizabeth Watkins	121	0.36	
Total valid votes		33,157	98.89	
Total rejected ballots		372	1.11	-0.62
Turnout		33,529	84.34	-6.46
Electors on the lists		39,754	–	
Parti Québécois hold		Swing		+0.10

1980 Quebec referendum
Side	Votes	%
Oui	20,946	51.60
Non	19,650	48.40

1976 Quebec general election
Party	Candidate	Votes	%	±%
Parti Québécois	Claude Morin	22,850	58.22	+11.37
Liberal	Jean Marchand	13,307	33.90	-15.11
Union Nationale	Raymond Cantin	2,705	6.89	+4.94
Ralliement créditiste	Jean-Paul Rhéaume	386	0.98	-1.07
Total valid votes		39,248	98.27	
Total rejected ballots		689	1.73	-0.54
Turnout		39,397	90.80	+5.89
Electors on the lists		43,984	–	
Parti Québécois gain from Liberal		Swing		+13.24

1973 Quebec general election
Party	Candidate	Votes	%	±%
Liberal	Gaston Desjardins	17,583	49.01	-5.08
Parti Québécois	Claude Morin	16,806	46.84	+21.87
Parti créditiste	Pierre Allard	735	2.05	-3.87
Union Nationale	Maurice Drolet	702	1.96	-13.06
Marxist–Leninist	Robert Lapointe	50	0.14	
Total valid votes		35,876	97.74	
Total rejected ballots		830	2.26	
Turnout		36,706	84.91	
Electors on the lists		43,229	–	
Liberal hold		Swing		-13.47

1970 Quebec general election
Party	Candidate	Votes	%	±%
Liberal	Claude Castonguay	25,026	54.09	-11.62
Parti Québécois	Georges Caron	11,555	24.97	+23.83
Union Nationale	Jean Duchaine	6,949	15.02	-9.41
Ralliement créditiste	Louis Seigneur	2,738	5.92	
Total valid votes		46,268	97.85	
Total rejected ballots		1,017	2.15	
Turnout		47,285	87.49	
Electors on the lists		54,048	–	
Liberal hold		Swing		-17.72

^ PQ change compared to RN.

1966 Quebec general election
Party	Candidate	Votes	%
Liberal	Jean Lesage	22,532	65.70
Union Nationale	Maxime Langlois	8,376	24.42
RIN	Henri Laberge	2,991	8.72
Ralliement national	Arthur Beauchemin	394	1.15
Total valid votes		34,293	98.37
Total rejected ballots		569	1.63
Turnout		34,862	77.16
Electors on the lists		45,183	–

== See also ==
- List of Quebec provincial electoral districts
- Canadian provincial electoral districts
