= 1980 Quebec referendum =

Plebiscite on Quebec's independence from Canada

Quebec sovereignty-association referendum, 1980
- May 20, 1980
- The Government of Quebec has made public its proposal to negotiate a new agreement with the rest of Canada, based on the equality of nations; this agreement would enable Quebec to acquire the exclusive power to make its laws, levy its taxes and establish relations abroad - in other words, sovereignty - and at the same time to maintain with Canada an economic association including a common currency; any change in political status resulting from these negotiations will only be implemented with popular approval through another referendum; on these terms, do you give the Government of Quebec the mandate to negotiate the proposed agreement between Quebec and Canada? French version Le Gouvernement du Québec a fait connaître sa proposition d'en arriver, avec le reste du Canada, à une nouvelle entente fondée sur le principe de l'égalité des peuples; cette entente permettrait au Québec d'acquérir le pouvoir exclusif de faire ses lois, de percevoir ses impôts et d'établir ses relations extérieures, ce qui est la souveraineté, et, en même temps, de maintenir avec le Canada une association économique comportant l'utilisation de la même monnaie; aucun changement de statut politique résultant de ces négociations ne sera réalisé sans l'accord de la population lors d'un autre référendum; en conséquence, accordez-vous au Gouvernement du Québec le mandat de négocier l'entente proposée entre le Québec et le Canada?

Results
Choice	Votes	%
Yes	1,485,852	40.44%
No	2,187,991	59.56%
Valid votes	3,673,843	98.26%
Invalid or blank votes	65,011	1.74%
Total votes	3,738,854	100.00%
Registered voters/turnout	4,367,584	85.6%

The 1980 Quebec independence referendum was the first referendum in Quebec on the place of Quebec within Canada and whether Quebec should pursue a path toward sovereignty. The referendum was called by Quebec's Parti Québécois (PQ) government, which advocated secession from Canada.

The province-wide referendum took place on May 20, and the proposal to pursue secession was defeated by a 59.56 per cent to 40.44 per cent margin.

A second referendum on sovereignty, which was held in 1995, also rejected pursuing secession, albeit by a much smaller margin (50.58% to 49.42%).

== Background ==
Quebec, a province since Canadian Confederation in 1867, has always been the sole majority French-speaking province. Since Canada's creation, tensions have existed between the French and English parts of the country. With English being the only national language until 1969, French Canadians in Quebec saw bilingualism as a “one-way road”, with French speakers expected to learn English to cater to Anglophones both in Quebec and the rest of the country. The Roman Catholic Church held power over everything from educational to welfare institutions in the province, with Quebec citizens having to pay tithe taxes to the Church.

As industrialization grew the size of the working middle class, power remained in the hands of English speakers. In Montreal, many mayors through the nineteenth and twentieth centuries did not speak French. This led to what The Canadian Journal of Economics and Political Science called "a Montreal elite largely imported, overall Anglo-Saxon, and dominated by business matters". Across Quebec, business was conducted in English, with French speakers never controlling more than 20% of businesses throughout the 1900s. This constant subordination of French Canadians in Quebec led to the Quiet Revolution, characterized by the effective secularization of society and the creation of a welfare state (état-providence). It also caused a realignment of provincial politics into federalist and sovereigntist factions, the latter calling for the separation of Quebec from Canada and its establishment as a sovereign nation state.

A prominent sovereigntist was René Lévesque, who helped found the Parti Québécois (PQ) with like-minded separatists. The PQ proposed "sovereignty-association", a proposal for Quebec to be a sovereign nation-state while requiring (hence the hyphen) an economic partnership with what remained of Canada. The PQ had intended to declare independence upon forming government, citing the principle of parliamentary supremacy. This was changed in the party platform after internal lobbying by Claude Morin to a referendum strategy to better allow such a declaration to be internationally recognized.

The PQ won the 1976 election in a surprise rout of the governing Quebec Liberals of Robert Bourassa on a general platform of good government and the promise of holding a referendum on sovereignty-association during their first term. In government, the PQ implemented a number of popular reforms to longstanding issues in the province, while emphasizing its nationalist credentials with laws such as Bill 101, which reinforced French as the province's official language. The bill controls everything from street signs to education to internal business communications, and essentially gives everyone the right to live in Quebec without knowing English. While the bill was popular in French circles as it finally affirmed their language rights, it added to the tension in English communities. With anything English-only, even product labels, effectively banned, Bill 101 may have contributed to growing Anglophone migration out of Quebec, and one Anglophone paper at the time said Bill 101 made Quebec a “police state”.

The PQ's efforts were in philosophical conflict with the federal Liberal government of Pierre Elliot Trudeau, an opponent of sovereignty who instead urged Quebecers to seek empowerment at the federal level through reforms that provided for bilingualism and protection for individual rights. Trudeau, an effective campaigner whose party had dominated federal politics in Quebec for over 80 years, was considered such a formidable opponent that Lévesque refused to implement a referendum while Trudeau remained in office.

In the 1979 federal election, the Liberals were narrowly defeated by the Progressive Conservatives led by Joe Clark, whose platform had included a more accommodating approach to constitutional negotiations with the provinces. Clark's minority government made a point to not have the federal government be involved in the referendum, leaving the task of representing federalist voices to Claude Ryan, the new leader of the Quebec Liberal Party.

On June 21, 1979, Lévesque announced the promised referendum would occur in the spring of 1980, and that the question would be announced before Christmas.

== Leadup ==
On November 1, 1979, the Quebec government made public its constitutional proposal in a white paper entitled Québec-Canada: A New Deal. The Québec Government Proposal for a New Partnership Between Equals: Sovereignty-Association.

A dramatic change occurred in Ottawa on December 11, 1979, when a series of confused phone calls led the nationalist Social Credit Members of Parliament (MPs) to abstain from a budget vote, which, along with a concerted Liberal and New Democratic Party (NDP) push, led the Clark government to unexpectedly lose a vote of confidence on a budget bill, precipitating a federal election. Three days afterward, Trudeau announced his return as leader of the Liberals. Polls showed Clark losing handily.

== Question ==
The referendum question was a subject of much internal debate amongst the Parti Québécois caucus. Pur et durs such as Finance Minister Jacques Parizeau preferred a simple question on the entirety of the proposal. Lévesque came to the view that, as sovereignty-association would by necessity require negotiations with the Government of Canada, the government of Quebec should be treated as a legal agent and require ratification of its final decision. He also felt the safety of a second referendum would convince swing voters to back the "Yes."

A significant debate arose as to whether a "question" under the Referendum Act could have more than one sentence: the final compromise was to use semicolons.

The question announced on December 20, 1979, was:

"The Government of Quebec has made public its proposal to negotiate a new agreement with the rest of Canada, based on the equality of nations; this agreement would enable Quebec to acquire the exclusive power to make its laws, levy its taxes and establish relations abroad — in other words, sovereignty — and at the same time to maintain with Canada an economic association including a common currency; any change in political status resulting from these negotiations will only be implemented with popular approval through another referendum; on these terms, do you give the Government of Quebec the mandate to negotiate the proposed agreement between Quebec and Canada?" (Note: In French: « Le Gouvernement du Québec a fait connaître sa proposition d’en arriver, avec le reste du Canada, à une nouvelle entente fondée sur le principe de l’égalité des peuples ; cette entente permettrait au Québec d'acquérir le pouvoir exclusif de faire ses lois, de percevoir ses impôts et d’établir ses relations extérieures, ce qui est la souveraineté, et, en même temps, de maintenir avec le Canada une association économique comportant l’utilisation de la même monnaie ; aucun changement de statut politique résultant de ces négociations ne sera réalisé sans l’accord de la population lors d’un autre référendum ; en conséquence, accordez-vous au Gouvernement du Québec le mandat de négocier l’entente proposée entre le Québec et le Canada ? »)

Lévesque, while noting its cumbersome nature, stated that it was transparent and could be easily understood.

== Legislative debate ==
The Liberals presented their constitutional proposal, known as the "Beige Paper" on January 10, 1980, which advocated a decentralized Canadian federation. While generally viewed as detailed and competent, the report did not make much impact on the federal election, and was attacked by the PQ as vague and insubstantial. Ryan, who disliked the federal Liberals, refused to endorse either Trudeau or Clark.

On February 18, 1980, the federal Liberals won a majority in the House of Commons, and Trudeau returned as Prime Minister. Trudeau announced Jean Chrétien, his most trusted lieutenant, as having responsibilities for the federal response to the referendum. Ryan was furious.

Television had recently been introduced to the Quebec National Assembly, and the legislative debate on the referendum question was scheduled for prime time live viewing on March 4, 1980. The debate lasted two weeks, and the result was a smashing PQ success and a disaster for the provincial Liberals. The PQ Cabinet, coordinated by House Leader Claude Charron, provided detailed outlines of their files and the benefits they said sovereignty would provide them. The Liberals provided quick and taunting retorts regarding the referendum question that would normally be heard on the legislative floor, but which appeared to be flippant and insubstantial compared to the lengthy and detailed speeches of PQ members to television viewers. The Liberals seemed to lack preparation and Ryan, unaware of the television cameras, was caught yawning on a few occasions during Liberal interventions.

Polls released after the debates showed the Yes and No side roughly even, with a majority amongst Francophone voters for the "Yes."

== Brunch des Yvettes ==
Less helpful to the "Yes" campaign was a speech by the Minister of Consumer Affairs, Cooperatives and Financial Institutions Lise Payette to a committee in Montreal, which mocked what she viewed as the "No" side's complacency by using the conception of Yvette, a docile schoolgirl from pre-Quiet Revolution schoolbooks, a general theme she had also used in the legislature. Payette then stated that Ryan wanted a Quebec full of "Yvettes" and that his wife, Madeline Ryan, was an Yvette. The personal attack prompted a furious editorial by prominent journalist Lise Bissonnette, who sarcastically contrasted Payette's televised exploits with Mme Ryan's accomplishments in the private and public sector.

Payette apologized during the legislative debate, but the remark and editorial sparked a movement. On March 30, a group of 1,700 women, including Madeline Ryan, held the brunch des Yvettes at the Château Frontenac in Quebec City. The movement grew until a rally at the Montreal Forum on April 7 when close to 15,000 women, among them the federal Health Minister, a legislator in the National Assembly of Quebec, and incoming Speaker of the House of Commons, denounced the minister's declarations about women and manifested their support for the "No" side.

== Campaign ==
On April 15, Lévesque announced before the National Assembly the referendum would occur on May 20, 1980. The same day, on the opening of the House of Commons, Trudeau announced that the Government of Canada would not negotiate sovereignty-association under any circumstances, as he considered the question too vague and the Canadian government's authority too uncertain to do so. He also stated that the question was too vague to give Lévesque and the PQ any mandate to declare independence, making any result from a "Yes" vote impossible; in contrast, he offered that a "No" vote would lead to constitutional change. His position was supported by Clark and national NDP leader Ed Broadbent.

The "Yes" campaign was, in the initial stages, low key. It focused on gaining broad acceptance of sovereignty-association through specialized "regroupments" that would be presented with special certificates at ceremonies led by Lévesque and other cabinet ministers. The regroupments were seen as an attempt to show broad support for the movement and create conversations at the ground level, however, the attempt to create them in some heavily Federalist professions, such as lawyers, prompted a severe backlash.

The "No" campaign, led by Ryan, was run as a traditional election campaign, with Ryan campaigning during the day and making speeches in local hockey arenas across rural Quebec.

Controversially, the Canadian government became involved on its own accord in the referendum despite the provisions of the provincial Referendum Act, which tightly restricted all campaigning to the designated "Yes" and "No" committees with set budgets. Canadian government politicians made appearances coordinated by Minister of Justice Jean Chrétien and Marc Lalonde, mainly speculating on the economic uncertainty a "Yes" vote could bring. Chrétien argued that prominent PQ member Claude Morin would sacrifice Canada's oil and national gas price to drive in an ambassadors' Cadillac. Lalonde argued that old age pensions were directly threatened by a "Yes" vote. Though initially reluctant, Ryan started to accept and welcome the Canadian government's help, and continued to speak across Quebec.

The referendum prompted an unheard-of political mobilization, and the campaign was seen as a traumatic event in Quebec, as the hard choice between "Yes" and "No" shattered the nationalist consensus that had existed since the Quiet Revolution.

=== Trudeau at Paul Sauvé Arena ===
On May 14, six days before the vote, Trudeau made his final appearance at a packed Paul Sauvé Arena, where the PQ had celebrated their victory in 1976. Trudeau attacked the "Yes" campaign for not asking a clear question, and stated that a "Yes" vote was a dead end, given that the rest of Canada was not bound by the question and that it was too vague to pursue independence if negotiations were refused.

Trudeau then stated that he would interpret a vote for the "No" as a mandate to renew federalism and change the constitution, putting his MPs' seats on the line if he were to fail to keep this promise. Addressing himself to Canadians outside Quebec on behalf of his MPs, Trudeau challenged English Canada that change would have to occur and that the referendum could not be interpreted as an endorsement of the status quo.

After this Trudeau hit an emotional high note, invoking a remark by Lévesque days earlier that he was showing his "Elliott" side during the campaign. Trudeau detailed the story of his parents, who had both had many ancestors in Quebec, and remarked that his full name was both a Québécois and a Canadian name. Trudeau then began to list members of the Parti Québécois who had Irish or English last names. The riposte brought the crowd to an uproar, and Trudeau exited to chants of "Elliott."

The speech, which prompted Morin to wonder if his mind was changed, was seen as the death knell of the "Yes" camp, despite Lévesque's attempts to cast doubt over Trudeau's words.

== Results ==
No: 2,187,991 (59.56%)	Yes: 1,485,851 (40.44%)
▲

	Total votes	% of votes
Valid ballots	3,673,842	98.26%
Rejected ballots	65,012	1.74%
Participation rate	3,738,854	85.61%
Registered voters	4,367,584	

== Immediate aftermath ==
After the lopsided defeat, a visibly emotional Lévesque addressed his supporters, many of whom were shown on screen in tears at the result. Lévesque began with, "My dear friends, if I understand you correctly, you're saying: 'until next time'". While calling the Canadian government's involvement in the campaign "scandalously immoral", he emphasized that the result must be accepted and that it was now the Canadian government's responsibility to provide the promised changes to the constitution. He ended asking the audience to sing "Gens du Pays" for him, as he did not have any voice left.

Claude Ryan's speech was later in the evening. After refusing to let Jean Chrétien use the microphone to address those gathered, he proceeded to demand an election be called and listed every riding that had voted for the "No" side. The speech was generally seen as callous and harsh, especially after the emotional crowd scenes broadcast during Lévesque's speech. Trudeau addressed the country afterward with a more conciliatory tone, emphasizing the need for unity after the hurt feelings and strained friendships that had been caused by the referendum. The next morning, Chrétien was tasked with creating a provincial consensus.

In Montreal, reactions were divided and emotional. Many predicted the referendum would result in violence and an early election. Shortly after results were released, a small riot of “Yes” voters marched through Westmount, a wealthy English neighbourhood, causing minor property damage. The aftermath of the referendum was filled with uncertainty, with sociologist Maurice Penard predicting more violence and an early election.

== Expenses ==
Maximum amount authorized by referendum law: $2,122,257 ($0.50/voter x 4,244,514 voters)

"No" Committee:

- State subsidy ($0.25/voter): $1,061,128.50
- Amount received by political parties: $987,754.04
- Contributions by voters: $11,572.60
- Total fund: $2,060,455.11
- Total committed and discharged expenditure: $2,060,455.00

"Yes" Committee:

- State subsidy ($0.25/voter) : $1,061,128.50
- Amount received by political parties: $683,000.00
- Contributions by voters: $305,118.05
- Total fund: $2,049,246.55
- Total committed and discharged expenditure: $2,047,834.00

== Effects ==
After the referendum, Trudeau acted upon his promise by calling together the provincial premiers in a first ministers' conference. The meeting showed signs of deadlock, and Lévesque surprised observers by uniting with the dissident premiers, who warmly received his decentralist views. Facing a lack of cooperation from the premiers, Trudeau then announced his intention to unilaterally patriate the constitution from the United Kingdom and have a charter of rights and constitutional amending formula approved by national referendum.

In the meantime, there was a provincial election in Quebec. Despite a brief post-referendum malaise, the PQ easily defeated Ryan's Liberals in the 1981 provincial election, campaigning both on their governing record and against Trudeau's intentions. Notably, the PQ did not promise to hold a second referendum.

With regards to Trudeau's plans to unilaterally patriate and change the constitution, the newly re-elected Lévesque, who had initially argued for the incorporation of a Quebec veto into the new constitution, agreed with eight other premiers (the Gang of Eight) to a proposal that would not allow Quebec a veto, but would permit "opting out" of certain federal endeavours with compensation.

The federal government, still interested in proceeding unilaterally, sought an opinion on whether it was legally entitled to do so from the Supreme Court of Canada. The Supreme Court ruled that any constitutional changes, including patriation of the constitution, could be made unilaterally under the letter of the law, but, by non-binding convention, "a substantial degree of provincial consent was required".

The Supreme Court's decision prompted a final meeting among the first ministers. Lévesque abandoned the Gang of Eight and opted to join Trudeau in advocating immediate patriation with the promise of a future referendum on the other matters. The other premiers, loath to be seen arguing against the charter of rights that was included in Trudeau's proposed constitutional changes, formulated a compromise proposal with Jean Chrétien that was acceptable to the Canadian government. The compromise came during the Kitchen Meeting, which took place after Lévesque had left for the evening. In Quebec, that night has sometimes been called the "Night of the Long Knives".

As a result of the compromise between the premiers (other than Lévesque) and the federal government, the government patriated the Canadian constitution in the Constitution Act, 1982 without support from Lévesque or Quebec's National Assembly. The result was a shattering defeat for the PQ, especially after the Quebec government's loss in its Quebec Veto Reference case. The National Assembly of Quebec, compared to its position in 1976, actually lost power under Lévesque and the PQ.

Historical debate would centre on whether Trudeau's advocacy and agreement on patriation were in accord with or in contravention of his commitments made in his speech at the Paul Sauvé Arena. Trudeau defended his actions by stating he had kept his promise to deliver a new constitution that resided entirely within Canada and an embedded Charter of Rights. Quebec nationalists argue that this is an overly literal view of his words and that, in context to a Québécois audience, Trudeau had promised that Quebec would be given a status in accordance with a decentralized view of federalism, or his MPs would resign.

In 1984, Brian Mulroney led the Progressive Conservatives to victory nationally, having committed during the campaign to try to find a way to accommodate Quebec's objections to the constitution. Lévesque pledged to take the risk of trying to work towards a deal with Mulroney. This led to a split in the PQ and subsequently Lévesque's resignation from politics in 1985. After the PQ defeat by the Liberals of Robert Bourassa, the Mulroney government began negotiations with Quebec to find a deal that would be acceptable to all provinces. The 1987 Meech Lake Accord and the 1992 Charlottetown Accord, despite receiving unanimous consent among the provincial premiers, each failed in dramatic public fashion, reviving the sovereignty movement.

The PQ returned to office, led by hard-line separatist and former Finance Minister Jacques Parizeau, in 1994. Parizeau called a second sovereignty referendum of 1995, which featured a more direct question. That referendum failed by a margin of less than 0.6%.

== See also ==
- 1995 Quebec referendum

== Bibliography ==
- “1980 Referendum: Trudeau’s ‘Elliott’ Speech a Turning Point in Canadian History" - Policy Magazine, May 19, 2020.
- Banfield, Jane. “Silent Revolution in Canada.” Transition, no. 22 (1965): 46.
- Bastien, Frédéric Bastien (2013). The Battle of London: Trudeau, Thatcher, and the Fight for Canada's Constitution. Toronto: Dundurn. ISBN 9781459723290.
- Bourassa, Guy. “Les Elites Politiques de Montreal: De L’Aristocratie a La Democratie.” The Canadian Journal of Economics and Political Science / Revue Canadienne d’Economique et de Science Politique 31, no. 1 (1965): 39.
- Bourhis, Richard. “Evaluating the Impact of Bill 101 on the English-Speaking Communities of Quebec.” Language Problems and Language Planning, 208, 2019.
- Dodge, Andy. “Windows, Flower Bed Victims of ‘Oui’ March.” Westmount Examiner, May 22, 1980.
- English, John (2009). Just Watch Me: The Life of Pierre Elliott Trudeau Volume Two: 1968–2000. Toronto: Knopf Canada. ISBN 978-0-676-97523-9.
- Fenwick, Rudy. “Social Change and Ethnic Nationalism: An Historical Analysis of the Separatist Movement in Quebec.” Comparative Studies in Society and History 23, no. 2 (1981): 196–203.
- Fraser, Graham (1984). PQ: René Lévesque and the Parti Québécois in Power. Toronto: MacMillan. ISBN 0771597932.
- Heritage, Canadian. “History of the Official Languages Act,” December 17, 2021.
- “Les Yvettes, ce mouvement spontané de femmes fédéralistes.” Accessed December 5, 2024.
- Lévesque, René (1986). Memoirs. Montreal: McClelland and Stewart. ISBN 0-7710-5285-5.
- MacDonald, Ian L. "1980 referendum: Trudeau’s ‘Elliott’ speech a turning point in Canadian history."
- McDonald, Kenneth. “Francization: From the Absurd to Tragic.” The Daily Colonist, July 26, 1978. Vingeault, Jean. “Le Sociologue Pinard Craint Une Flambée de Violence.” La Tribune, May 22, 1980, sec. Cahier B.
- Trudeau, Pierre Elliot (1993). Memoirs. Toronto: McClelland & Stewart. ISBN 0-771-08588-5.
- Sheppard, Robert; Valpy, Michael (1982). The National Deal: The Fight for a Canadian Constitution. Scarborough: Fleet Books. ISBN 0770600190.
- Wilson, Frank L. “French-Canadian Separatism.” The Western Political Quarterly 20, no. 1 (1967): 118–19.
