= Fundi (politics) =

Faction of green parties

Fundis is short for fundamentalists. The term was used for a faction within the German Green Party. The faction was formed in conflict to the Realo-faction within their party. The term has also been applied to similar conflicts.

== General meaning ==
The abbreviation Fundi is a label applied to members who tend towards a fundamentalist interpretation of its common ideology (e.g. 'green' values), as opposed to the more "pragmatic realism" of the Realo alternative. Other terms for green Fundis are wild greens or deep greens. They tend towards veganism, a strong animal rights approach and an aversion to traditional political methods, rejecting more centralized systems of governance. Many Fundis believe that economic growth and industrialism are the root of ecological problems, and therefore advocate for an end to modern industry, instead proposing a system of decentralized rural communities driven by post-industrial economics.

== German Greens ==
In the 1980s and 1990s, a conflict between the Fundis and the Realos with the German Green Party arose. While the Realos, the group around Joschka Fischer, were in favour of cabinet cooperation, the Fundis opposed cabinet cooperation. The Fundis were composed of deep greens and eco-socialists. They did not only oppose cabinet cooperation, but were also in favour of strict term limits. In addition to disagreements on party business, the conflict can be traced to ideological disputes. While the Realos were in favour of moderate policies and the notion of 'sustainable growth'–regulated economic growth within the limits of ecological sustainability–the Fundis took a more radical stance in dismissing the notion of economic growth altogether, seeing it as necessarily polluting.

The term was first used within the Hessen Green party. In the 1982 state elections the party gained 8% of vote, and neither the SPD or the CDU had a majority of their own. In their program Hessen Greens had claimed that there was a "fundamental opposition between the anti-life and anti-democratic politics of the SPD, CDU and FDP." Those who had opposed a coalition with the SPD were called Fundis. The Greens tolerated an SPD-minority government for three years and in 1985 they entered the coalition, a victory for the Realos. Joschka Fischer became their minister.

During the party congress on 22–23 June 1985 in Hagen, the Realos won a victory on the federal level when they adopted a motion, saying that the Greens could "use the full bandwidth of parliamentary possibilities, ranging from opposition to single-party government". At the end of the 1980s the Fundis founded the Left Forum. In 1990 a group of prominent eco-socialists left the party, in 1991 a group of deep greens also left. Some of those joined the PDS and others founded their own party.

In 1998 the Greens joined the federal cabinet, a final victory for the Realos. In the following years the division between realos and Fundis became less important.

== Other uses ==
In the Green Party of Canada and the Flemish party Agalev-party the term was also used to describe similar conflicts. In France conflicts between 'Fundi' and 'Realo' led to several splits within the Green Party, resulting in a 'pleiade' of green parties.

In an article on the Greens/Green Party USA’s website, the organization characterized the split between itself and the Green Party of the United States (GPUS) as akin to the fundi–realo split in the German Greens, with itself being the fundi wing and GPUS the realos.

The term has been used to describe the ideological differences within the Australian Greens and its member parties.

== See also ==
- Realpolitik
- Fundamentalists and gradualists, similar divide in the Scottish National Party
- Pur et dur and Étapisme, similar divide in the Quebec sovereignty movement
- Reformist socialism and Possibilism, gradualist tendencies in the socialist movement
- Revolutionary socialism and Impossibilism, revolutionary tendencies in the socialist movement
- Centrist Marxism intermediate tendency in the socialist movement
- Libertarian possibilism, current in the Spanish anarchist movement supporting participation in parliamentary politics
