= Claude Morin (PQ politician) =

Canadian politician (1929–2026)

Claude Morin (May 16, 1929 – May 5, 2026) was a Canadian politician from Quebec, who was the Parti Québécois Member of the National Assembly for the electoral district of Louis-Hébert, from 1976 to 1981. He became embroiled in controversy in 1992 when the affaire Morin came to light.

== Life and career ==
Born in Montmorency, Quebec, Morin received a bachelor's degree from Université Laval. He went to Columbia University in New York City where he took a master's degree in social welfare. He worked as a professor at the École nationale d'administration publique. He was an economic adviser to the Quebec cabinet from 1961 to 1965, and deputy minister of federal-provincial affairs from 1963 to 1967, and deputy minister of intergovernmental affairs from 1967 to 1971.

Morin first ran unsuccessfully in the 1973 Quebec general election, but was elected in 1976 and served as Minister of Intergovernmental Affairs in the cabinet of Premier René Lévesque. He was re-elected in 1981, however he resigned as MNA on December 29, 1981 and left his position as minister on January 8, 1982.

In 1992, it was revealed by reporter Normand Lester that Morin had been on the payroll of the Royal Canadian Mounted Police (RCMP) from 1974 to 1977 as a sort of "mole" within the PQ.

He wrote the "political autobiography" Les Choses comme elles étaient in 1994, and L'affaire Morin : légendes, sottises et calomnies in 2006.

Morin died on May 5, 2026, at the age of 96. He was the nephew of Joseph-Octave Morin, a member of the Legislative Assembly of Quebec.
