= Paul Bégin =

Canadian politician

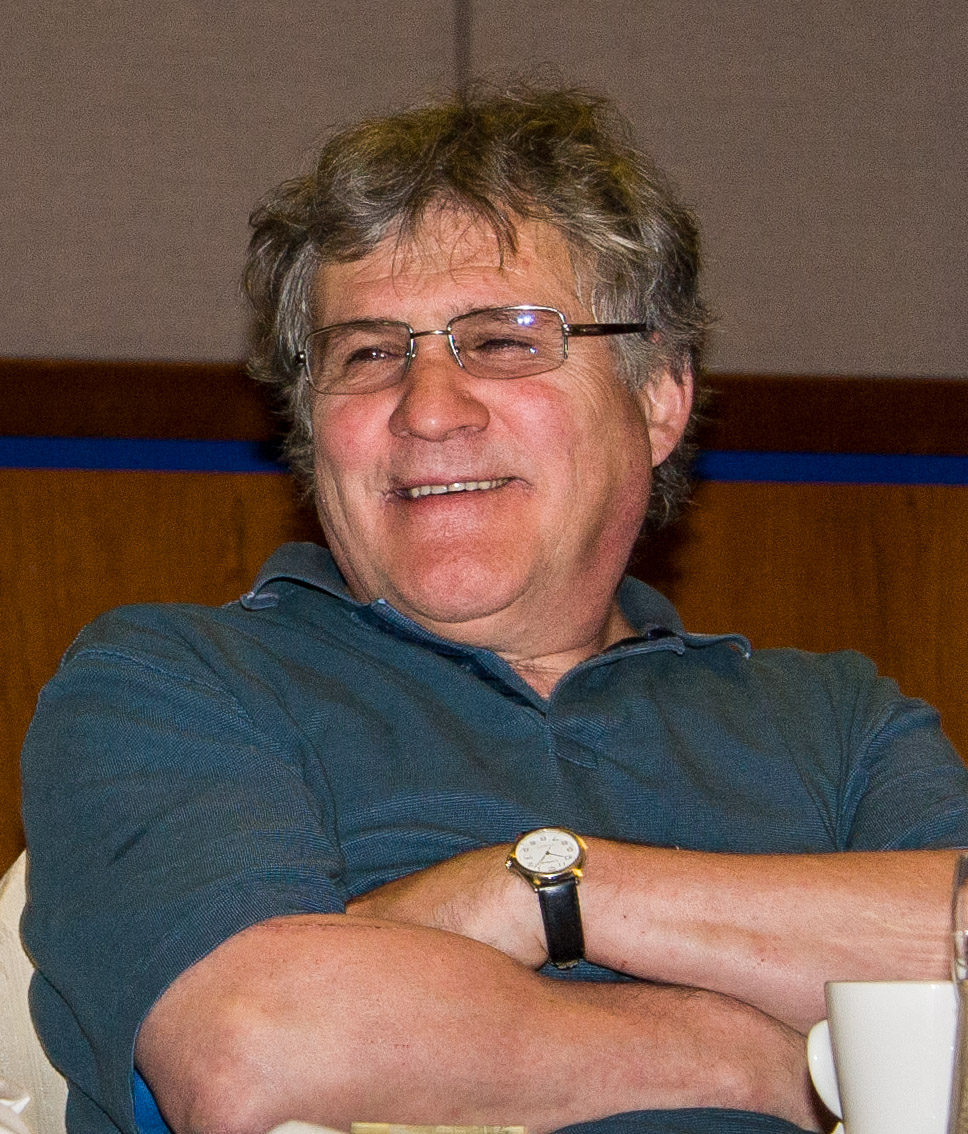
Paul Bégin picture

Paul Bégin (born May 15, 1943, in Dolbeau-Mistassini, Quebec) is a former Quebec politician and Cabinet Minister. Member of the Parti Québecois, he served as the province's Justice Minister from 1994 to 1997 and from 2001 to 2002.

Begin is a graduate from the Université Laval obtaining a law degree. He was admitted to the Barreau du Québec in 1969 and practiced law for 25 years mostly at the law firm Pinsonneault Pothier Begin Delisle.

He was first elected in the Louis-Hébert riding in the 1994 elections when the Parti Québécois re-claimed power after 9 years of Liberal governance under Robert Bourassa and Daniel Johnson Jr. During his political career, he was also a member of Cabinet, being first named for the first time as Justice Minister in the Jacques Parizeau (and later Lucien Bouchard) Cabinet from 1994 to 1997. He was also the Environment Minister from 1997 to 2001, Minister of Wildlife from 1997 to 1998 and Minister of Revenue from 1999 to 2001 before being renamed as Justice Minister in the Bernard Landry's Cabinet for his final year until he sat as an Independent MNA in 2002. He did not seek a third mandate in the 2003 elections.
